= Fencing at the 1980 Summer Olympics – Women's foil =

Fencing at the Olympics

Women's foil at the Games of the XXII Olympiad
- Venue: Central Army Sports Club Complex
- Dates: 23 – 24 July 1980
- Competitors: 33 from 14 nations

Medalists
1st place, gold medalist(s)		Pascale Trinquet-Hachin	France
2nd place, silver medalist(s)		Magda Maros	Hungary
3rd place, bronze medalist(s)		Barbara Wysoczańska	Poland

The women's foil was one of eight fencing events on the fencing at the 1980 Summer Olympics programme. It was the eleventh appearance of the event. The competition was held from 23 to 24 July 1980. 33 fencers from 14 nations competed.

== Results ==
=== Round 1 ===
==== Round 1 Pool A ====
Pos	Fencer	W	L	TF	TA	Qual.	MMZ	MR	VS	AB	KP
1	Marcela Moldovan-Zsak (ROU)	4	0	20	9	Q		5–3	5–4	5–0	5–2
2	Margarita Rodríguez (CUB)	2	2	17	15	Q	3–5		4–5	5–4	5–1
3	Valentina Sidorova (URS)	2	2	14	15	Q	4–5	5–4		0–5	5–1
4	Ann Brannon (GBR)	1	3	12	15	Q	0–5	4–5	5–0		3–5
5	Kerstin Palm (SWE)	1	3	9	18		2–5	1–5	1–5	5–3	

Source: Official Report, vol. 3, p. 261

==== Round 1 Pool B ====
Pos	Fencer	W	L	TF	TA	Qual.	YNB	SA	BW	CA	MB
1	Yelena Novikova-Belova (URS)	4	0	20	10	Q		5–3	5–2	5–2	5–3
2	Suzana Ardeleanu (ROU)	2	2	17	16	Q	3–5		4–5	5–4	5–2
3	Barbara Wysoczańska (POL)	2	2	16	17	Q	2–5	5–4		5–3	4–5
4	Clara Alfonso (CUB)	1	3	14	18	Q	2–5	4–5	3–5		5–3
5	Micheline Borghs (BEL)	1	3	13	19		3–5	2–5	5–4	3–5	

Source: Official Report, vol. 3, p. 261

==== Round 1 Pool C ====
Pos	Fencer	W	L	TF	TA	Qual.	BLG	DS	NG	MF	SB
1	Brigitte Latrille-Gaudin (FRA)	3	1	18	15	Q		5–2	5–4	5–4	3–5
2	Delfina Skąpska (POL)	3	1	17	15	Q	2–5		5–3	5–4	5–3
3	Nailya Gilyazova (URS)	2	2	17	13	Q	4–5	3–5		5–2	5–1
4	Marlene Font (CUB)	1	3	15	18	Q	4–5	4–5	2–5		5–3
5	Susanna Batazzi (ITA)	1	3	12	18		5–3	3–5	1–5	3–5	

Source: Official Report, vol. 3, p. 261

==== Round 1 Pool D ====
Pos	Fencer	W	L	TF	TA	Qual.	DV	KLR	SH	IST	HS	JK
1	Dorina Vaccaroni (ITA)	4	1	21	14	Q		5–2	5–1	5–2	1–5	5–4
2	Katarína Lokšová-Ráczová (TCH)	3	2	21	19	Q	2–5		4–5	5–2	5–3	5–4
3	Sabine Hertrampf (GDR)	3	2	16	19	Q	1–5	5–4		0–5	5–4	5–1
4	Ildikó Schwarczenberger-Tordasi (HUN)	2	3	18	16	Q	2–5	2–5	5–0		4–5	5–1
5	Helen Smith (AUS)	2	3	19	20		5–1	3–5	4–5	5–4		2–5
6	Jolanta Królikowska (POL)	1	4	15	22		4–5	4–5	1–5	1–5	5–2	

Source: Official Report, vol. 3, p. 261

==== Round 1 Pool E ====
Pos	Fencer	W	L	TF	TA	Qual.	ESI	VB	MF	GJ	GS	LAM
1	Ecaterina Stahl-Iencic (ROU)	4	1	22	13	Q		5–1	2–5	5–2	5–3	5–2
2	Véronique Brouquier (FRA)	3	2	19	18	Q	1–5		5–4	5–3	3–5	5–1
3	Mitzi Ferguson (AUS)	3	2	20	19	Q	5–2	4–5		1–5	5–4	5–3
4	Gabriele Janke (GDR)	2	3	19	20	Q	2–5	3–5	5–1		4–5	5–4
5	Gertrúd Stefanek (HUN)	2	3	20	22		3–5	5–3	4–5	5–4		3–5
6	Linda Ann Martin (GBR)	1	4	15	23		2–5	1–5	3–5	4–5	5–3	

Source: Official Report, vol. 3, p. 261

==== Round 1 Pool F ====
Pos	Fencer	W	L	TF	TA	Qual.	MMar	ARS	PTH	MN	MMad	SW
1	Magda Maros (HUN)	5	0	25	11	Q		5–2	5–3	5–4	5–1	5–1
2	Anna Rita Sparaciari (ITA)	3	2	20	16	Q	2–5		3–5	5–2	5–2	5–2
3	Pascale Trinquet-Hachin (FRA)	3	2	20	21	Q	3–5	5–3		5–4	2–5	5–4
4	Mandy Niklaus (GDR)	2	3	20	17	Q	4–5	2–5	4–5		5–1	5–1
5	Max Madsen (DEN)	1	4	13	22		1–5	2–5	5–2	1–5		4–5
6	Susan Wrigglesworth (GBR)	1	4	13	24		1–5	2–5	4–5	1–5	5–4	

Source: Official Report, vol. 3, p. 261

=== Round 2 ===
==== Round 2 Pool A ====
Pos	Fencer	W	L	TF	TA	Qual.	CA	VS	MM	KLR	ARS	SA
1	Clara Alfonso (CUB)	5	0	25	12	Q		5–1	5–4	5–2	5–4	5–1
2	Valentina Sidorova (URS)	3	2	20	13	Q	1–5		5–0	4–5	5–2	5–1
3	Magda Maros (HUN)	3	2	19	16	Q	4–5	0–5		5–3	5–2	5–1
4	Katarína Lokšová-Ráczová (TCH)	3	2	20	17	Q	2–5	5–4	3–5		5–2	5–1
5	Anna Rita Sparaciari (ITA)	1	4	15	21		4–5	2–5	2–5	2–5		5–1
6	Suzana Ardeleanu (ROU)	0	5	5	25		1–5	1–5	1–5	1–5	1–5	

Source: Official Report, vol. 3, p. 262

==== Round 2 Pool B ====
Pos	Fencer	W	L	TF	TA	Qual.	DS	NG	MN	VB	MF	MMZ
1	Delfina Skąpska (POL)	4	1	22	23	Q		2–5	5–1	5–2	5–2	5–3
2	Nailya Gilyazova (URS)	4	1	24	16	Q	5–2		4–5	5–4	5–1	5–4
3	Mandy Niklaus (GDR)	3	2	18	19	Q	1–5	5–4		2–5	5–2	5–3
4	Véronique Brouquier (FRA)	2	3	19	21	Q	2–5	4–5	5–2		3–5	5–4
5	Marlene Font (CUB)	2	3	15	21		2–5	1–5	2–5	5–3		5–3
6	Marcela Moldovan-Zsak (ROU)	0	5	17	25		3–5	4–5	3–5	4–5	3–5	

Source: Official Report, vol. 3, p. 262

==== Round 2 Pool C ====
Pos	Fencer	W	L	TF	TA	Qual.	BW	YNB	BLG	GJ	MR	MF
1	Barbara Wysoczańska (POL)	5	0	25	6	Q		5–0	5–2	5–0	5–3	5–1
2	Yelena Novikova-Belova (URS)	4	1	20	15	Q	0–5		5–1	5–3	5–2	5–4
3	Brigitte Latrille-Gaudin (FRA)	3	2	18	14	Q	2–5	1–5		5–1	5–0	5–3
4	Gabriele Janke (GDR)	2	3	24	20	Q	0–5	3–5	1–5		5–2	5–3
5	Margarita Rodríguez (CUB)	1	4	12	24		3–5	2–5	0–5	2–5		5–4
6	Mitzi Ferguson (AUS)	0	5	15	25		1–5	4–5	3–5	3–5	4–5	

Source: Official Report, vol. 3, p. 262

==== Round 2 Pool D ====
Pos	Fencer	W	L	TF	TA	Qual.	PTH	DV	IST	ESI	AB	SH
1	Pascale Trinquet-Hachin (FRA)	5	0	25	9	Q		5–1	5–2	5–1	5–1	5–4
2	Dorina Vaccaroni (ITA)	4	1	21	13	Q	1–5		5–3	5–3	5–1	5–1
3	Ildikó Schwarczenberger-Tordasi (HUN)	2	3	18	19	Q	2–5	3–5		5–1	3–5	5–3
4	Ecaterina Stahl-Iencic (ROU)	2	3	15	18	Q	1–5	3–5	1–5		5–1	5–2
5	Ann Brannon (GBR)	2	3	13	22		1–5	1–5	5–3	1–5		5–4
6	Sabine Hertrampf (GDR)	0	5	14	25		4–5	1–5	3–5	2–5	4–5	

Source: Official Report, vol. 3, p. 262

=== Double elimination rounds ===
==== Winners brackets ====
===== Winners group 1 =====
Round of 16		Round of 8
Ildikó Schwarczenberger-Tordasi (HUN)	W
Yelena Novikova-Belova (URS)	L	Ildikó Schwarczenberger-Tordasi (HUN)	L
Brigitte Latrille-Gaudin (FRA)	W	Brigitte Latrille-Gaudin (FRA)	W
Clara Alfonso (CUB)	L

===== Winners group 2 =====
Round of 16		Round of 8
Barbara Wysoczańska (POL)	W
Valentina Sidorova (URS)	L	Barbara Wysoczańska (POL)	W
Pascale Trinquet-Hachin (FRA)	W	Pascale Trinquet-Hachin (FRA)	L
Mandy Niklaus (GDR)	L

===== Winners group 3 =====
Round of 16		Round of 8
Dorina Vaccaroni (ITA)	W
Véronique Brouquier (FRA)	L	Dorina Vaccaroni (ITA)	W
Katarína Lokšová-Ráczová (TCH)	W	Katarína Lokšová-Ráczová (TCH)	L
Delfina Skąpska (POL)	L

===== Winners group 4 =====
Round of 16		Round of 8
Ecaterina Stahl-Iencic (ROU)	W
Nailya Gilyazova (URS)	L	Ecaterina Stahl-Iencic (ROU)	L
Magda Maros (HUN)	W	Magda Maros (HUN)	W
Gabriele Janke (GDR)	L

==== Losers brackets ====
===== Losers group 1 =====
Round of 4
Yelena Novikova-Belova (URS)	W
Clara Alfonso (CUB)	L
Valentina Sidorova (URS)	L
Mandy Niklaus (GDR)	W

Round of 4
Yelena Novikova-Belova (URS)	L
Katarína Lokšová-Ráczová (TCH)	W
Mandy Niklaus (GDR)	L
Ecaterina Stahl-Iencic (ROU)	W

Round of 2
Katarína Lokšová-Ráczová (TCH)	L
Ecaterina Stahl-Iencic (ROU)	W

===== Losers group 2 =====
Round of 4
Véronique Brouquier (FRA)	L
Delfina Skąpska (POL)	W
Nailya Gilyazova (URS)	W
Gabriele Janke (GDR)	L

Round of 4
Delfina Skąpska (POL)	W
Ildikó Schwarczenberger-Tordasi (HUN)
Nailya Gilyazova (URS)	L
Pascale Trinquet-Hachin (FRA)	W

Round of 2
Delfina Skąpska (POL)	L
Pascale Trinquet-Hachin (FRA)	W

=== Final round ===
Pos	Fencer	W	L	TF	TA	PTH	MM	BW	ESI	BLG	DV
1st place, gold medalist(s)	Pascale Trinquet-Hachin (FRA)	4	1	21	16		5–4	1–5	5–4	5–3	5–0
2nd place, silver medalist(s)	Magda Maros (HUN)	3	2	23	17	4–5		5–2	4–5	5–4	5–1
3rd place, bronze medalist(s)	Barbara Wysoczańska (POL)	3	2	19	18	5–1	2–5		2–5	5–3	5–4
4	Ecaterina Stahl-Iencic (ROU)	2	3	19	21	4–5	5–4	5–2		3–5	2–5
5	Brigitte Latrille-Gaudin (FRA)	2	3	20	22	3–5	4–5	3–5	5–3		5–4
6	Dorina Vaccaroni (ITA)	1	4	14	22	0–5	1–5	4–5	5–2	4–5	

Source: Official Report, vol. 3, p. 263

== Final classification ==
Fencer	Country
Pascale Trinquet-Hachin	France
Magda Maros	Hungary
Barbara Wysoczańska	Poland
Ecaterina Stahl-Iencic	Romania
Brigitte Latrille-Gaudin	France
Dorina Vaccaroni	Italy
Katarína Lokšová-Ráczová	Czechoslovakia
Delfina Skąpska	Poland
Nailya Gilyazova	Soviet Union
Ildikó Schwarczenberger-Tordasi	Hungary
Yelena Novikova-Belova	Soviet Union
Mandy Niklaus	East Germany
Clara Alfonso	Cuba
Valentina Sidorova	Soviet Union
Véronique Brouquier	France
Gabriele Janke	East Germany
Marlene Font	Cuba
Ann Brannon	Great Britain
Anna Rita Sparaciari	Italy
Margarita Rodríguez	Cuba
Marcela Moldovan-Zsak	Romania
Mitzi Ferguson	Australia
Sabine Hertrampf	East Germany
Suzana Ardeleanu	Romania
Helen Smith	Australia
Gertrúd Stefanek	Hungary
Susanna Batazzi	Italy
Micheline Borghs	Belgium
Kerstin Palm	Sweden
Jolanta Królikowska	Poland
Linda Ann Martin	Great Britain
Max Madsen	Denmark
Susan Wrigglesworth	Great Britain
