= Fencing at the 1980 Summer Olympics – Women's team foil =

Fencing at the Olympics

Women's team foil at the Games of the XXII Olympiad
- Venue: Central Army Sports Club Complex
- Dates: 26–27 July 1980
- Competitors: 43 from 9 nations

Medalists
1st place, gold medalist(s)		Pascale Trinquet-Hachin, Brigitte Latrille-Gaudin, Christine Muzio, Isabelle Boéri-Bégard, Véronique Brouquier	France
2nd place, silver medalist(s)		Valentina Sidorova, Nailya Gilyazova, Yelena Novikova-Belova, Irina Ushakova, Larisa Tsagarayeva	Soviet Union
3rd place, bronze medalist(s)		Magda Maros, Edit Kovács, Ildikó Schwarczenberger-Tordasi, Zsuzsa Szőcs, Gertrúd Stefanek	Hungary

The women's team foil was one of eight fencing events on the fencing at the 1980 Summer Olympics programme. It was the sixth appearance of the event. The competition was held from 26 to 27 July 1980. 43 fencers from 9 nations competed.

== Rosters ==
Cuba
- Margarita Rodríguez
- Marlene Font
- María Esther García
- Clara Alfonso

East Germany
- Mandy Niklaus
- Gabriele Janke
- Sabine Hertrampf
- Beate Schubert

France
- Pascale Trinquet-Hachin
- Brigitte Latrille-Gaudin
- Christine Muzio
- Isabelle Boéri-Bégard
- Véronique Brouquier

Great Britain
- Susan Wrigglesworth
- Ann Brannon
- Wendy Ager
- Linda Ann Martin
- Hilary Cawthorne

Hungary
- Magda Maros
- Edit Kovács
- Ildikó Schwarczenberger-Tordasi
- Zsuzsa Szőcs
- Gertrúd Stefanek

Italy
- Dorina Vaccaroni
- Anna Rita Sparaciari
- Susanna Batazzi
- Carola Mangiarotti
- Clara Mochi

Poland
- Delfina Skąpska
- Agnieszka Dubrawska
- Jolanta Królikowska
- Barbara Wysoczańska
- Kamilla Składanowska

Romania
- Ecaterina Stahl-Iencic
- Marcela Moldovan-Zsak
- Viorica Țurcanu
- Suzana Ardeleanu
- Aurora Dan

Soviet Union
- Valentina Sidorova
- Nailya Gilyazova
- Yelena Novikova-Belova
- Irina Ushakova
- Larisa Tsagarayeva

== Results ==
=== Round 1 ===
==== Round 1 Pool A ====
Cuba and France each defeated East Germany, 8–8 (68–67 on touches) and 11–5, respectively. The two victors then faced off. France won 9–5.

Pos	Team	W	L	BW	BL	Qual.	FRA	CUB	GDR
1	France	2	0	20	10	QS		9–5	11–5
2	Cuba	1	1	13	17	QQ	5–9		8.68–8.67
3	East Germany	0	2	13	19		5–11	8.67–8.68	

Source: Official Report, vol. 3, p. 265

==== Round 1 Pool B ====
Italy and the Soviet Union each defeated Romania, 9–7 and 11–5, respectively. The two victors then faced off. The Soviet Union won 9–4.

Pos	Team	W	L	BW	BL	Qual.	URS	ITA	ROU
1	Soviet Union	2	0	20	9	QS		9–4	11–5
2	Italy	1	1	13	16	QQ	4–9		9–7
3	Romania	0	2	12	20		5–11	7–9	

Source: Official Report, vol. 3, pp. 265–66

==== Round 1 Pool C ====
Great Britain defeated Hungary, 8–8 with a touches tie-breaker of 61–58. Hungary then beat Poland, 10–6. Great Britain needed only a win or narrow loss to advance (8–8 would be sufficient to ensure Great Britain's advancement through the bouts tie-breaker, while a 9–7 loss would require looking to the touches tie-breaker), but Poland won decisively at 12–4 to set a three-way tie at 1–1. The bouts tie-breaker left Great Britain out of the elimination rounds. Poland had a 122–106 touches record to Hungary's 119–113, giving the Polish team the first place in the group.

Pos	Team	W	L	BW	BL	Qual.	POL	HUN	GBR
1	Poland	1	1	18	14	QQ		6–10	12–4
2	Hungary	1	1	18	14	QQ	10–6		8.58–8.61
3	Great Britain	1	1	12	20		4–12	8.61–8.58	

Source: Official Report, vol. 3, pp. 266–67

=== Elimination rounds ===
Quarterfinals
C2	Hungary	9
B2	Italy	6
A1	France
Bye
C1	Poland	9
A2	Cuba	7
B1	Soviet Union
Bye

Semifinals
C2	Hungary	6
A1	France	9
C1	Poland	3
B1	Soviet Union	9

Final
A1	France	9
B1	Soviet Union	6
Third place
C2	Hungary	9
C1	Poland	7

Fifth Place
B2	Italy	9
A2	Cuba	6
