= Swimming at the 1980 Summer Olympics – Women's 4 × 100 metre medley relay =

Women's 4 × 100 metre medley relay at the Games of the XXII Olympiad
- Venue: Swimming Pool at the Olimpiysky Sports Complex
- Dates: 20 July 1980 (heats & final)
- Competitors: 43 from 10 nations
- Teams: 10
- Winning time: 4:06.67 WR

Medalists
1st place, gold medalist(s)		Rica Reinisch; Ute Geweniger; Andrea Pollack; Caren Metschuck; Sarina Hülsenbeck*	East Germany
2nd place, silver medalist(s)		Helen Jameson; Margaret Kelly; Ann Osgerby; June Croft	Great Britain
3rd place, bronze medalist(s)		Yelena Kruglova; Elvira Vasilkova; Alla Grishchenkova; Natalya Strunnikova; Irina Aksyonova*; Olga Klevakina*; *Indicates the swimmer only competed in the preliminary heats.	Soviet Union

The women's 4 × 100 metre medley relay event at the 1980 Summer Olympics was held on 20 July at the Swimming Pool at the Olimpiysky Sports Complex.

== Records ==
Prior to this competition, the existing world and Olympic records were as follows.

World record	East Germany (GDR); Ulrike Richter (1:02.23); Hannelore Anke (1:10.15); Andrea Pollack (59.53); Kornelia Ender (56.04)	4:07.95	Montreal, Canada	18 July 1976
Olympic record	East Germany; Ulrike Richter (1:02.23); Hannelore Anke (1:10.15); Andrea Pollack (59.53); Kornelia Ender (56.04)	4:07.95	Montreal, Canada	18 July 1976

The following records were established during the competition:

Date	Event	Name	Nationality	Time	Record
20 July	Final	Rica Reinisch (1:01.51); Ute Geweniger (1:09.46); Andrea Pollack (1:00.14); Caren Metschuck (55.56)	East Germany	4:06.67	WR, OR

== Results ==
=== Heats ===
Rank	Heat	Nation	Swimmers	Time	Notes
1	2	East Germany	Rica Reinisch (1:01.95); Ute Geweniger (1:09.66); Andrea Pollack (1:01.04); Sarina Hülsenbeck (56.24)	4:08.89	Q
2	1	Great Britain	Helen Jameson (1:05.59); Margaret Kelly (1:11.10); Ann Osgerby (1:01.91); June Croft (57.69)	4:16.29	Q
3	2	Soviet Union	Elena Kruglova (1:05.21); Elvira Vasilkova (1:10.02); Irina Aksyonova (1:03.11); Olga Klevakina (58.12)	4:16.46	Q
4	2	Sweden	Annika Uvehall (1:07.18); Eva-Marie Håkansson (1:11.80); Agneta Mårtensson (1:02.79); Tina Gustafsson (58.17)	4:19.94	Q
5	2	Italy	Laura Foralosso (1:06.09); Sabrina Seminatore (1:13.05); Cinzia Savi Scarponi (1:03.57); Monica Vallarin (58.98)	4:21.69	Q
6	1	Australia	Lisa Forrest (1:04.89); Lisa Curry (1:15.13); Karen Van de Graaf (1:03.54); Rosemary Brown (59.77)	4:23.33	Q
7	1	Bulgaria	Stoianka Dyngalakova (1:06.50); Tanya Bogomilova (1:13.51); Ani Moneva (1:04.95); Dobrinka Mincheva (58.73)	4:23.69	Q
8	1	Romania	Carmen Bunaciu (1:03.85); Brigitte Prass (1:14.31); Mariana Paraschiv (1:12.00); Irinel Pănulescu (53.92)	4:24.08	Q
9	2	Mexico	Teresa Rivera (1:04.54); Elke Holtz (1:14.58); Dagmar Erdman (1:08.33); Helen Plaschinski (58.50)	4:25.95	
10	2	Belgium	Yolande Van Der Straeten (1:05.61); Brigitte Bosmans (1:16.89); Carine Verbauwen (1:04.38); Pascale Verbauwen (59.45)	4:26.33	

=== Final ===
Rank	Nation	Swimmers	Time	Notes
1st place, gold medalist(s)	East Germany	Rica Reinisch (1:01.51) =WR; Ute Geweniger (1:09.46); Andrea Pollack (1:00.14); Caren Metschuck (55.56)	4:06.67	WR
2nd place, silver medalist(s)	Great Britain	Helen Jameson (1:04.60); Margaret Kelly (1:09.95); Ann Osgerby (1:01.77); June Croft (55.92)	4:12.24	
3rd place, bronze medalist(s)	Soviet Union	Elena Kruglova (1:04.60); Elvira Vasilkova (1:10.10); Alla Grishchenkova (1:02.72); Natalya Strunnikova (56.19)	4:13.61	
4	Sweden	Annika Uvehall (1:06.45); Eva-Marie Håkansson (1:11.25); Agneta Mårtensson (1:02.06); Tina Gustafsson (57.15)	4:16.91	
5	Italy	Laura Foralosso (1:04.20); Sabrina Seminatore (1:12.91); Cinzia Savi Scarponi (1:02.61); Monica Vallarin (59.33)	4:19.05	
6	Australia	Lisa Forrest (1:04.59); Lisa Curry (1:13.61); Karen Van de Graaf (1:03.07); Rosemary Brown (58.63)	4:19.90	
7	Romania	Carmen Bunaciu (1:03.37); Brigitte Prass (1:14.23); Mariana Paraschiv (1:04.46); Irinel Pănulescu (59.21)	4:21.27	
8	Bulgaria	Stoianka Dyngalakova (1:06.23); Tanya Bogomilova (1:12.39); Ani Moneva (1:04.91); Dobrinka Mincheva (58.85)	4:22.38	
