= Swimming at the 1980 Summer Olympics – Women's 200 metre backstroke =

Women's 200 metre backstroke at the Games of the XXII Olympiad
- Venue: Swimming Pool at the Olimpiysky Sports Complex
- Date: 27 July
- Competitors: 21 from 13 nations
- Winning time: 2:11.77 WR

Medalists
1st place, gold medalist(s)		Rica Reinisch	East Germany
2nd place, silver medalist(s)		Cornelia Polit	East Germany
3rd place, bronze medalist(s)		Birgit Treiber	East Germany

The women's 200 metre backstroke event at the 1980 Summer Olympics was held on 27 July at the Swimming Pool at the Olimpiysky Sports Complex.

== Records ==
Prior to this competition, the existing world and Olympic records were as follows.

World record	Linda Jezek (USA)	2:11.93	West Berlin, West Germany	28 August 1978
Olympic record	Ulrike Richter (GDR)	2:13.46	Montreal, Canada	25 July 1976

The following records were established during the competition:

Date	Event	Name	Nationality	Time	Record
27 July	Heat 2	Rica Reinisch	East Germany	2:13.00	OR
27 July	Final	Rica Reinisch	East Germany	2:11.77	WR

== Results ==
=== Heats ===
Rank	Heat	Name	Nationality	Time	Notes
1	2	Rica Reinisch	East Germany	2:13.00	Q, OR
2	3	Cornelia Polit	East Germany	2:14.81	Q
3	1	Lisa Forrest	Australia	2:15.40	Q
4	3	Birgit Treiber	East Germany	2:15.53	Q
5	2	Carmen Bunaciu	Romania	2:15.88	Q
6	1	Yolande Van der Straeten	Belgium	2:16.62	Q
7	1	Larisa Gorchakova	Soviet Union	2:16.68	Q
8	1	Carine Verbauwen	Belgium	2:16.96	Q
9	3	Jolanda de Rover	Netherlands	2:17.12	
10	2	Georgina Parkes	Australia	2:17.78	
11	2	Helen Jameson	Great Britain	2:17.84	
12	1	Jane Admans	Great Britain	2:19.20	
13	2	Monique Bosga	Netherlands	2:19.21	
14	3	Teresa Rivera	Mexico	2:21.51	
15	3	Yelena Kruglova	Soviet Union	2:22.41	
16	1	Manuela Carosi	Italy	2:22.46	
17	1	Michèle Ricaud	France	2:22.86	
18	3	Agnieszka Czopek	Poland	2:23.06	
19	3	Ágnes Fodor	Hungary	2:23.56	
20	3	Magdalena Białas	Poland	2:26.85	
21	1	Nguyễn Thị Hồng Bích	Vietnam	2:52.90	
	2	Annika Uvehall	Sweden	DNS	
	2	Andrea Kálmán	Hungary	DNS	
	2	María Paris	Costa Rica	DNS	

=== Final ===
Rank	Name	Nationality	Time	Notes
1st place, gold medalist(s)	Rica Reinisch	East Germany	2:11.77	WR
2nd place, silver medalist(s)	Cornelia Polit	East Germany	2:13.75	
3rd place, bronze medalist(s)	Birgit Treiber	East Germany	2:14.14	
4	Carmen Bunaciu	Romania	2:15.20	
5	Yolande van der Straeten	Belgium	2:15.58	
6	Carine Verbauwen	Belgium	2:16.66	
7	Lisa Forrest	Australia	2:16.75	
8	Larisa Gorchakova	Soviet Union	2:17.72	
