= Swimming at the 1980 Summer Olympics – Women's 100 metre backstroke =

Women's 100 metre backstroke at the Games of the XXII Olympiad
- Venue: Swimming Pool at the Olimpiysky Sports Complex
- Date: 22 July (heats); 23 July (final)
- Competitors: 26 from 18 nations
- Winning time: 1:00.86 WR

Medalists
1st place, gold medalist(s)		Rica Reinisch	East Germany
2nd place, silver medalist(s)		Ina Kleber	East Germany
3rd place, bronze medalist(s)		Petra Riedel	East Germany

The women's 100 metre backstroke event at the 1980 Summer Olympics was held on 22 and 23 July at the Swimming Pool at the Olimpiysky Sports Complex.

== Records ==
Prior to this competition, the existing world and Olympic records were as follows.

World record	Ulrike Richter (GDR); Rica Reinisch (GDR)	1:01.51	East Berlin, East Germany; Moscow, Soviet Union	5 June 1976; 20 July 1980
Olympic record	Ulrike Richter (GDR)	1:01.83	Montreal, Canada	21 July 1976

The following records were established during the competition:

Date	Event	Name	Nationality	Time	Record
22 July	Heat 4	Rica Reinisch	East Germany	1:01.50	WR, OR
23 July	Final	Rica Reinisch	East Germany	1:00.86	WR, OR

== Results ==
=== Heats ===
Rank	Heat	Name	Nationality	Time	Notes
1	4	Rica Reinisch	East Germany	1:01.50	Q, WR
2	2	Ina Kleber	East Germany	1:02.15	Q
3	1	Carmen Bunaciu	Romania	1:03.25	Q
3	3	Petra Riedel	East Germany	1:03.25	Q
5	3	Larisa Gorchakova	Soviet Union	1:03.82	Q
6	3	Monique Bosga	Netherlands	1:04.36	Q
7	4	Carine Verbauwen	Belgium	1:04.37	Q
8	2	Manuela Carosi	Italy	1:04.42	Q
9	4	Teresa Rivera	Mexico	1:04.54	
10	2	Lisa Forrest	Australia	1:04.55	
11	1	Yelena Kruglova	Soviet Union	1:04.63	
12	2	Jolanda de Rover	Netherlands	1:04.79	
13	4	Laura Foralosso	Italy	1:04.86	
14	1	Georgina Parkes	Australia	1:05.06	
15	3	Yolande Van Der Straeten	Belgium	1:05.10	
16	4	Ágnes Fodor	Hungary	1:05.47	
17	4	Helen Jameson	Great Britain	1:05.56	
18	1	Michèle Ricaud	France	1:05.81	
19	1	Annika Uvehall	Sweden	1:06.33	
20	2	Joy Beasley	Great Britain	1:06.84	
21	3	Marianne Humpelstetter	Austria	1:07.68	
22	2	María Paris	Costa Rica	1:09.02	
23	2	Anabel Drousiotou	Cyprus	1:15.85	
24	1	Soad Fezzani	Libya	1:16.83	
25	4	Nguyễn Thị Hồng Bích	Vietnam	1:20.34	
26	3	Michele Pessoa	Angola	1:26.59	
	3	Andrea Kálmán	Hungary	DNS	

=== Final ===
Rank	Name	Nationality	Time	Notes
1st place, gold medalist(s)	Rica Reinisch	East Germany	1:00.86	WR
2nd place, silver medalist(s)	Ina Kleber	East Germany	1:02.07	
3rd place, bronze medalist(s)	Petra Riedel	East Germany	1:02.64	
4	Carmen Bunaciu	Romania	1:03.81	
5	Carine Verbauwen	Belgium	1:03.82	
6	Larisa Gorchakova	Soviet Union	1:03.87	
7	Monique Bosga	Netherlands	1:04.47	
8	Manuela Carosi	Italy	1:05.10	
