= Italy at the 1980 Summer Olympics =

- Flag of the Olympic Movement
- IOC code: ITA
- NOC: Italian National Olympic Committee

in Moscow
- Competitors: 159 (121 men and 38 women) in 19 sports
- Medals Ranked 5th: Gold 8 Silver 3 Bronze 4 Total 15

Summer Olympics appearances (overview)
- 1896; 1900; 1904; 1908; 1912; 1920; 1924; 1928; 1932; 1936; 1948; 1952; 1956; 1960; 1964; 1968; 1972; 1976; 1980; 1984; 1988; 1992; 1996; 2000; 2004; 2008; 2012; 2016; 2020; 2024

Other related appearances
- 1906 Intercalated Games

Italy competed at the 1980 Summer Olympics in Moscow, Russian SFSR, USSR. In partial support of the American-led boycott of the 1980 Summer Olympics, Italy competed under the Olympic Flag instead of its national flag. 159 competitors, 121 men and 38 women, took part in 88 events in 19 sports.

== Medalists ==
=== Gold ===
- Pietro Mennea — Athletics, Men's 200 metres
- Maurizio Damilano — Athletics, Men's 20 km Walk
- Sara Simeoni — Athletics, Women's High Jump
- Patrizio Oliva — Boxing, Men's Light Welterweight
- Federico Roman — Equestrian, Three-Day Event Individual Competition
- Ezio Gamba — Judo, Men's Lightweight (71 kg)
- Luciano Giovannetti — Shooting, Men's Trap
- Claudio Pollio — Wrestling, Men's Freestyle Light Flyweight

=== Silver ===
- Marco Solfrini, Renzo Vecchiato, Renato Villalta, Dino Meneghin, Romeo Sacchetti, Michael Silvester, Pietro Generali, Enrico Gilardi, Pierluigi Marzorati, Marco Bonamico, Roberto Brunamonti, and Fabrizio Della Fiori — Basketball, Men's Team Competition
- Marina Sciocchetti, Anna Casagrande, Federico Roman, and Mauro Roman — Equestrian, Three-Day Event Team Competition
- Ferdinando Meglio, Michele Maffei, Mario Aldo Montano, and Marco Romano — Fencing, Sabre Team Competition

=== Bronze ===
- Giancarlo Ferrari — Archery, Men's Individual Competition
- Mauro Zuliani, Stefano Malinverni, Pietro Mennea, and Roberto Tozzi — Athletics, Men's 4 × 400 m Relay
- Giorgio Cagnotto — Diving, Men's Springboard
- Giorgio Gorla and Alfio Peraboni — Sailing, Men's Star Team Competition

== Archery ==
For the first time, Italy entered a woman in the Olympic archery competition. She placed a respectable tenth place. Giancarlo Ferrari repeated his bronze medal-winning performance of four years earlier.

Women's Individual Competition:

- Franca Capetta — 2342 points (→ 10th place)

Men's Individual Competition:

- Giancarlo Ferrari — 2449 points (→ Bronze Medal)
- Sante Spigarelli — 2405 points (→ 14th place)

== Athletics ==
Men's 100 metres

- Pietro Mennea

- Heat — 10.56
- Quarterfinals — 10.27
- Semifinals — 10.58 (→ did not advance)

Men's 800 metres

- Carlo Grippo

- Heat — 1:48.9
- Semifinals — 1:48.7 (→ did not advance)

Men's 1,500 metres

- Vittorio Fontanella

- Heat — 3:40.1
- Semifinals — 3:40.1
- Final — 3:40.4 (→ 5th place)

Men's Marathon

- Massimo Magnani

- Final — 2:13:12 (→ 8th place)

- Marco Marchei

- Final — 2:23:21 (→ 35th place)

Men's 4x400 metres Relay

- Stefano Malinverni, Mauro Zuliani, Roberto Tozzi, and Pietro Mennea

- Heat — 3:03.5
- Final — 3:04.3 (→ Bronze Medal)

Men's 3,000 m Steeplechase

- Giuseppe Gerbi

- Heat — 8:37.1
- Semifinals — 8:27.2
- Final — 8:18.5 (→ 6th place)

- Roberto Volpi

- Heat — 8:35.6
- Semifinals — 8:29.7 (→ did not advance)

Men's High Jump

- Marco Tamberi

- Qualification — 2.21 m
- Final — 2.15 m (→ 15th place)

- Oscar Raise

- Qualification — 2.18 m (→ did not advance)

- Paolo Borghi

- Qualification — 2.18 m (→ did not advance)

Men's Hammer Throw

- Giampaolo Urlando

- Qualification — 72.20 m
- Final Round — 73.90 m (→ 7th place)

Men's Decathlon

- Alessandro Brogini

- Final — did not finish (→ no ranking)

Men's 20 km Walk

- Maurizio Damilano

- Final — 1:23:35.5 (→ Gold Medal)

- Giorgio Damilano

- Final — 1:33:26.2 (→ 11th place)

Women's 100 metres

- Marisa Masullo

- Heat — 11.77
- Quarterfinals — 11.57 (→ did not advance)

Women's 800 metres

- Gabriella Dorio

- Heat — 2:01.4
- Semifinals — 1:59.0
- Final — 1:59.2 (→ 8th place)

- Agnese Possamai

- Heat — 2:04.1 (→ did not advance)

- Daniela Porcelli

- Heat — 2:10.7 (→ did not advance)

Women's 1,500 metres

- Gabriella Dorio

- Heat — 4:05.0
- Final — 4:00.3 (→ 4th place)

- Agnese Possamai

- Heat — 4:14.7 (→ did not advance)

Women's High Jump

- Sara Simeoni

- Qualification — 1.88 m
- Final — 1.97 m (→ Gold Medal)

Women's Javelin Throw

- Fausta Quintavalla

- Qualification — 58.76 m
- Final — 57.52 m (→ 12th place)

Women's Shot Put

- Cinzia Petrucci

- Final — 17.27 m (→ 14th place)

== Basketball ==
Men's Team Competition

- Preliminary Round (Group C)

- Defeated Sweden (92–77)
- Lost to Australia (77–84)
- Defeated Cuba (79–72)

- Semi Final Round (Group A)

- Lost to Yugoslavia (81–102)
- Defeated Soviet Union (87–85)
- Lost to Brazil (77–90)
- Defeated Spain (95–89)

- Final

- Lost to Yugoslavia (77–86) → Silver Medal

- Team Roster:

- Romeo Sacchetti
- Roberto Brunamonti
- Michael Silvester
- Enrico Gilardi
- Fabrizio Della Fiori
- Marco Solfrini
- Marco Bonamico
- Dino Meneghin
- Renato Villalta
- Renzo Vecchiato
- Pierluigi Marzorati
- Pietro Generali

== Boxing ==
Men's Lightweight (– 60 kg)

- Carlo Russolillo
  1. First Round — Lost to Angel Herrera (Cuba) on points (0–5)

Men's Light-Welterweight (– 63,5 kg)

- Patrizio Oliva → Gold Medal
  1. First Round — Defeated Aurelien Agnan (Benin) after referee stopped contest in first round
  2. Second Round — Defeated Farez Halabi (Syria) after referee stopped contest in first round
  3. Quarter Finals — Defeated Ace Rusevski (Yugoslavia) on points (3–2)
  4. Semi Finals — Defeated Anthony Willis (Great Britain) on points (5–0)
  5. Final — Defeated Serik Konakbaev (Soviet Union) on points (4–1)

Men's Heavyweight (+ 81 kg)

- Francesco Damiani
  1. First Round — Defeated Teodor Pîrjol (Romania) on points (4–1)
  2. Quarter Finals — Lost to Piotr Zaev (Soviet Union) on points (0–5)

== Cycling ==
Ten cyclists represented Italy in 1980.

Individual road race

- Marco Cattaneo
- Gianni Giacomini
- Giuseppe Petito
- Alberto Minetti

Team time trial

- Mauro De Pellegrini
- Gianni Giacomini
- Ivano Maffei
- Alberto Minetti

Sprint

- Ottavio Dazzan

1000m time trial

- Guido Bontempi

Individual pursuit

- Pierangelo Bincoletto

Team pursuit

- Pierangelo Bincoletto
- Guido Bontempi
- Ivano Maffei
- Silvestro Milani

== Diving ==
Men's Springboard

- Giorgio Cagnotto

- Preliminary Round — 556.32 points (→ 6th place)
- Final — 871.500 points (→ Bronze Medal)

== Fencing ==
13 fencers, 8 men and 5 women, represented Italy in 1980.

Men's foil

- Federico Cervi

Men's épée

- Stefano Bellone
- Marco Falcone
- Angelo Mazzoni

Men's sabre

- Michele Maffei
- Ferdinando Meglio
- Mario Aldo Montano

Men's team sabre

- Mario Aldo Montano, Michele Maffei, Ferdinando Meglio, Marco Romano

Women's foil

- Dorina Vaccaroni
- Anna Rita Sparaciari
- Susanna Batazzi

Women's team foil

- Dorina Vaccaroni, Anna Rita Sparaciari, Susanna Batazzi, Carola Mangiarotti, Clara Mochi

== Modern pentathlon ==
One male pentathlete represented Italy in 1980.

Individual

- Pierpaolo Cristofori

== Swimming ==
Men's 100m Freestyle

- Paolo Revelli

- Heats — 52.74 (→ did not advance)

- Fabrizio Rampazzo

- Heats — 52.71 (→ did not advance)

- Raffaele Franceschi

- Heats — 52.26
- Semi-Finals — 51,87
- Final — 51.69 (→ 5th place)

Men's 200m Freestyle

- Paolo Revelli

- Heats — 1:52.56
- Final — 1:52.76 (→ 6th place)

- Fabrizio Rampezzo

- Heats — 1:52.62
- Final — 1:53.25 (→ 8th place)

Men's 4 × 200 m Freestyle Relay

- Paolo Revelli, Raffaele Franceschi, Andrea Ceccarini, and Fabrizio Rampazzo

- Final — 7:30.37 (→ 5th place)

Women's 100m Backstroke

- Manuela Carosi

- Final — 1.05.10 (→ 8th place)

Women's 100m Breaststroke

- Monica Bonon

- Heats — 1:12.36
- Final — 1:12.51 (→ 8th place)

- Sabrina Seminatore

- Heats — 1:13.76 (→ did not advance)

Women's 4 × 100 m Medley Relay

- Laura Foralosso, Sabrina Seminatore, Cinzia Savi-Scarponi, and Monica Vallarin

- Final — 4:19.06 (→ 5th place)

== Volleyball ==
Men's Team Competition

- Preliminary Round (Group A)

- Lost to Cuba (0–3)
- Defeated Czechoslovakia (3–2)
- Lost to Soviet Union (0–3)
- Lost to Bulgaria (1–3)

- Classification Match

- 9th/10th place: Defeated Libya (3–0) → 9th place

- Team Roster

- Antonio Bonini
- Claudio di Coste
- Mauro di Bernardo
- Sebastiano Greco
- Francesco Dall'Olio
- Giulio Belletti
- Fabrizio Nassi
- Giancarlo Dametto
- Stefano Sibani
- Giovanni Lanfranco
- Fabio Innocenti
- Franco Bertoli

== Water polo ==
Men's Team Competition

- Team Roster

- Alberto Alberani
- Roldano Simeoni
- Alfio Misaggi
- Sante Marsili
- Massimo Fondelli
- Gianni de Magistris
- Antonello Steardo
- Paolo Ragosa
- Romeo Collina
- Vincenzo d'Angelo
- Umberto Panerai
