= Swimming at the 1980 Summer Olympics – Women's 100 metre butterfly =

Women's 100 metre butterfly at the Games of the XXII Olympiad
- Venue: Swimming Pool at the Olimpiysky Sports Complex
- Date: 23 July (heats); 24 July (final)
- Competitors: 24 from 17 nations
- Winning time: 1:00.42

Medalists
1st place, gold medalist(s)		Caren Metschuck	East Germany
2nd place, silver medalist(s)		Andrea Pollack	East Germany
3rd place, bronze medalist(s)		Christiane Knacke	East Germany

The women's 100 metre butterfly event at the 1980 Summer Olympics was held on 23 and 24 July at the Swimming Pool at the Olimpiysky Sports Complex.

== Records ==
Prior to this competition, the existing world and Olympic records were as follows.

World record	Mary Meagher (USA)	59.26	Austin, United States	11 April 1980
Olympic record	Kornelia Ender (GDR)	1:00.13	Montreal, Canada	22 July 1976

== Results ==
=== Heats ===
Rank	Heat	Name	Nationality	Time	Notes
1	4	Andrea Pollack	East Germany	1:00.91	Q
2	3	Caren Metschuck	East Germany	1:01.08	Q
3	2	Christiane Knacke	East Germany	1:01.32	Q
4	4	Ann Osgerby	Great Britain	1:01.93	Q
5	1	Agneta Mårtensson	Sweden	1:02.79	Q
6	1	Maria Paris	Costa Rica	1:02.80	Q
7	4	Janet Osgerby	Great Britain	1:02.84	Q
8	1	Lisa Curry	Australia	1:02.92	Q
9	2	Susan Cooper	Great Britain	1:02.95	
10	3	Éva Miklósfalvy	Hungary	1:03.17	
11	2	Wilma van Velsen	Netherlands	1:03.31	
12	3	Cinzia Savi Scarponi	Italy	1:03.41	
13	2	Karen Ramsay	Australia	1:03.62	
14	3	Dorota Brzozowska	Poland	1:04.04	
15	4	Alla Grishchenkova	Soviet Union	1:04.10	
16	4	Sonja Hausladen	Austria	1:04.39	
17	3	Armi Airaksinen	Sweden	1:04.40	
18	1	Larisa Polivoda	Soviet Union	1:04.50	
19	2	Mariana Paraschiv	Romania	1:05.34	
20	1	Carole Brook	Switzerland	1:05.93	
21	2	Celeste García	Peru	1:06.25	
22	4	Marion Michel	Belgium	1:07.81	
23	1	Bako Ratsifa	Madagascar	1:09.43	
24	3	Nadia Fezzani	Libya	1:12.94	
	3	Dagmar Erdman	Mexico	DNS	

=== Final ===
Rank	Name	Nationality	Time	Notes
1st place, gold medalist(s)	Caren Metschuck	East Germany	1:00.42	
2nd place, silver medalist(s)	Andrea Pollack	East Germany	1:00.90	
3rd place, bronze medalist(s)	Christiane Knacke	East Germany	1:01.44	
4	Ann Osgerby	Great Britain	1:02.21	
5	Lisa Curry	Australia	1:02.40	
6	Agneta Mårtensson	Sweden	1:02.61	
7	Maria Paris	Costa Rica	1:02.89	
8	Janet Osgerby	Great Britain	1:02.90	
