= Swimming at the 1980 Summer Olympics – Men's 400 metre individual medley =

Men's 400 metre individual medley at the Games of the XXII Olympiad
- Venue: Swimming Pool at the Olimpiysky Sports Complex
- Date: 27 July
- Competitors: 24 from 15 nations
- Winning time: 4:22.89 OR

Medalists
1st place, gold medalist(s)		Aleksandr Sidorenko	Soviet Union
2nd place, silver medalist(s)		Sergey Fesenko	Soviet Union
3rd place, bronze medalist(s)		Zoltán Verrasztó	Hungary

The men's 400 metre individual medley event at the 1980 Summer Olympics was held on 27 July at the Swimming Pool at the Olimpiysky Sports Complex.

== Records ==
Prior to this competition, the existing world and Olympic records were as follows.

World record	Jesse Vassallo (USA)	4:20.05	West Berlin, West Germany	28 August 1978
Olympic record	Rod Strachan (USA)	4:23.68	Montreal, Canada	25 July 1976

The following records were established during the competition:

Date	Event	Name	Nationality	Time	Record
27 July	Final	Aleksandr Sidorenko	Soviet Union	4:22.89	OR

== Results ==
=== Heats ===
Rank	Heat	Name	Nationality	Time	Notes
1	1	Zoltán Verrasztó	Hungary	4:25.57	Q
2	1	Leszek Górski	Poland	4:26.02	Q
3	3	András Hargitay	Hungary	4:27.00	Q
4	4	Aleksandr Sidorenko	Soviet Union	4:28.02	Q
5	3	Sergey Fesenko	Soviet Union	4:28.18	Q
6	3	Daniel Machek	Czechoslovakia	4:28.66	Q
7	2	Djan Madruga	Brazil	4:28.77	Q
8	2	Miloslav Roľko	Czechoslovakia	4:29.19	Q
9	2	Simon Gray	Great Britain	4:29.43	
10	4	Csaba Sós	Hungary	4:29.69	
11	3	Dariusz Wolny	Poland	4:31.28	
12	1	Ricardo Prado	Brazil	4:31.69	
13	4	Thomas Lejdström	Sweden	4:33.05	
14	2	Giovanni Franceschi	Italy	4:33.66	
15	3	Vladimir Shemetov	Soviet Union	4:34.01	
16	2	Paul Moorfoot	Australia	4:34.28	
17	4	Stephen Poulter	Great Britain	4:35.21	
18	3	Franky de Groote	Belgium	4:36.99	
19	3	Guillermo Zavala	Mexico	4:37.58	
20	1	Evangelos Koskinas	Greece	4:39.44	
21	2	Gary Andersson	Sweden	4:41.32	
22	1	Andrey Aguilar	Costa Rica	4:41.74	
23	1	Rafael Escalas	Spain	4:42.49	
	4	Jörg Walter	East Germany	DSQ	
	2	Antonio Monteiro	Spain	DNS	
	4	Jean-Marc Carezic	Venezuela	DNS	
	4	Max Metzker	Australia	DNS	

=== Final ===
Rank	Name	Nationality	Time	Notes
1st place, gold medalist(s)	Aleksandr Sidorenko	Soviet Union	4:22.89	OR
2nd place, silver medalist(s)	Sergey Fesenko	Soviet Union	4:23.43	
3rd place, bronze medalist(s)	Zoltán Verrasztó	Hungary	4:24.24	
4	András Hargitay	Hungary	4:24.48	
5	Djan Madruga	Brazil	4:26.81	
6	Miloslav Roľko	Czechoslovakia	4:26.99	
7	Leszek Górski	Poland	4:28.89	
8	Daniel Machek	Czechoslovakia	4:29.86	
