= Swimming at the 1980 Summer Olympics – Women's 100 metre breaststroke =

Women's 100 metre breaststroke at the Games of the XXII Olympiad
- Venue: Swimming Pool at the Olimpiysky Sports Complex
- Date: 24 July 1980 (heats); 26 July (final)
- Competitors: 25 from 19 nations
- Winning time: 1:10.22

Medalists
1st place, gold medalist(s)		Ute Geweniger	East Germany
2nd place, silver medalist(s)		Elvira Vasilkova	Soviet Union
3rd place, bronze medalist(s)		Susanne Nielsson	Denmark

The women's 100 metre breaststroke event at the 1980 Summer Olympics was held on 24 and 26 July at the Swimming Pool at the Olimpiysky Sports Complex.

== Records ==
Prior to this competition, the existing world and Olympic records were as follows:

World record	Ute Geweniger (GDR)	1:10.20	Magdeburg, East Germany	26 May 1980
Olympic record	Hannelore Anke (GDR)	1:10.86	Montreal, Canada	22 July 1976

The following record was established during the competition:

Date	Event	Name	Nationality	Time	Record
24 July	Heat 4	Ute Geweniger	East Germany	1:10.11	WR

== Results ==
=== Heats ===
Rank	Heat	Name	Nationality	Time	Notes
1	4	Ute Geweniger	East Germany	1:10.11	Q, WR
2	1	Elvira Vasilkova	Soviet Union	1:11.03	Q
3	4	Susanne Nielsson	Denmark	1:11.58	Q
4	2	Eva-Marie Håkansson	Sweden	1:12.26	Q
5	3	Monica Bonon	Italy	1:12.36	Q
6	4	Margaret Kelly	Great Britain	1:12.38	Q
7	2	Lina Kačiušytė	Soviet Union	1:12.71	Q
8	2	Suki Brownsdon	Great Britain	1:12.83	Q
9	3	Silvia Rinka	East Germany	1:12.88	
10	1	Catherine Poirot	France	1:12.94	
11	2	Irena Fleissnerová	Czechoslovakia	1:13.35	
12	4	Tanya Bogomilova	Bulgaria	1:13.52	
13	1	Sabrina Seminatore	Italy	1:13.76	
14	4	Bettina Löbel	East Germany	1:14.32	
15	3	Gabriella Kindl	Hungary	1:14.33	
16	3	Yuliya Bogdanova	Soviet Union	1:15.04	
17	3	Brigitte Prass	Romania	1:15.10	
18	4	Elke Holtz	Mexico	1:15.89	
19	1	Brigitte Bosmans	Belgium	1:16.68	
20	3	Catherine Bohan	Ireland	1:16.84	
21	2	Lynne Tasker	Zimbabwe	1:18.81	
22	4	María Pia Ayora	Peru	1:20.46	
23	3	Phạm Thị Phú	Vietnam	1:22.73	
24	2	Nicole Rajoharison	Madagascar	1:24.83	
25	1	Garnet Charwat	Nicaragua	1:28.88	
	1	Lisa Curry	Australia	DNS	

=== Final ===
Rank	Name	Nationality	Time	Notes
1st place, gold medalist(s)	Ute Geweniger	East Germany	1:10.22	
2nd place, silver medalist(s)	Elvira Vasilkova	Soviet Union	1:10.41	
3rd place, bronze medalist(s)	Susanne Nielsson	Denmark	1:11.16	
4	Margaret Kelly	Great Britain	1:11.48	
5	Eva-Marie Håkansson	Sweden	1:11.72	
6	Suki Brownsdon	Great Britain	1:12.11	
7	Lina Kačiušytė	Soviet Union	1:12.21	
8	Monica Bonon	Italy	1:12.51	
