= Verbauwen =

Verbauwen is a surname. Notable people with the surname include:

- Carine Verbauwen (born 1961), Belgian swimmer
- Herman Verbauwen (born 1944), Belgian swimmer
- Pascale Verbauwen (born 1963), Belgian swimmer
