= 1980 Summer Olympics medal table =

1980 Summer Olympics medals
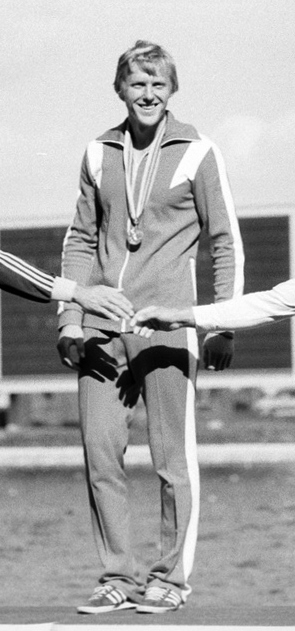
- Vladimir Parfenovich won three gold medals at the 1980 Summer Olympics, tied for the most of any competing athlete.
- Location: Moscow, Soviet Union

Highlights
- Most gold medals: Soviet Union (80)
- Most total medals: Soviet Union (195)
- Medalling NOCs: 36

World map showing the medal achievements of each country during the 1980 Summer Olympics. Legend: represents countries that won at least one gold medal. represents countries that won at least one silver medal but no gold medals. represents countries that won at least one bronze medal (no gold or silver). represents participating countries that did not win medals. represents entities that did not participate in the 1980 Summer Olympics.

The 1980 Summer Olympics, officially known as the Games of the XXII Olympiad, were an international multi-sport event held in Moscow, Russian SFSR, Soviet Union, from 19 July to 3 August. They were the first Olympic Games to be staged in a communist nation. A total of 5,179 athletes representing 80 National Olympic Committees (NOCs) participated, which included seven teams making their Olympic debut at the Summer Games; Angola, Botswana, Cyprus, Jordan, Laos, Mozambique, and Seychelles. This was the smallest number of participating NOCs since 1956. The games featured 203 events in 21 sports across 27 disciplines.

67 eligible countries participated in a boycott against these games, some of which did so explicitly citing the Soviet invasion of Afghanistan. Sixteen NOCs participated under the Olympic Flag, as opposed to their nation's flag, as a partial boycott. This included the Olympic Anthem and flag being used at medal ceremonies when athletes from these NOCs won medals.

Athletes representing 36 NOCs received at least one medal, with 25 NOCs winning at least one gold medal. The Soviet Union won the most overall medals, with 195, and the most gold medals, with 80, setting a new record for most golds won in a single games (which was later broken at the 1984 Games). Sports commentators noted that the absence of the United States and various other Western nations stemming from a large-scale boycott contributed to the highly skewed medal results benefitting the Soviet Union. Guyana, Tanzania, and Zimbabwe won their first Olympic medals of any kind, with Zimbabwe also winning their nation's first gold medal.

Among individual participants, Soviet gymnast Alexander Dityatin won the most medals overall with eight medals (three gold, four silver, one bronze), becoming the first athlete to win eight medals at a single games. Dityatin, Soviet canoer Vladimir Parfenovich, Soviet swimmer Vladimir Salnikov, and East German swimmers Barbara Krause, Caren Metschuck, and Rica Reinisch tied for the most gold medals, with three each.

== Medal table ==
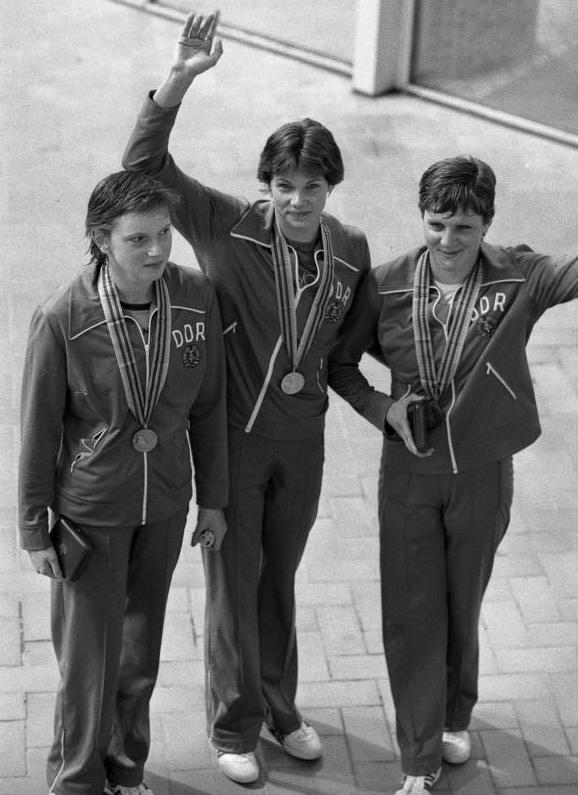
East Germany swept the podium in the women's 200 metre backstroke at the 1980 Summer Games. From left to right: Cornelia Polit, Rica Reinisch, and Birgit Treiber.

The medal table is based on information provided by the International Olympic Committee (IOC) and is consistent with IOC conventional sorting in its published medal tables. The table uses the Olympic medal table sorting method. By default, the table is ordered by the number of gold medals the athletes from a nation have won, where a nation is an entity represented by a NOC. The number of silver medals is taken into consideration next and then the number of bronze medals. If teams are still tied, equal ranking is given and they are listed alphabetically by their IOC country code.

Events in boxing resulted in bronze medals being awarded to each of the competitors who lost their semi-final matches, as opposed to them taking part in a third place tiebreaker. Events in judo used a repechage system which also resulted in two bronze medals being awarded.

In women's gymnastics floor there were two-way ties for first and third, respectively, resulting in two gold medals and two bronze medals being issued, with no silver medal being awarded. In men's pole vault and the women's gymnastic artistic individual all-around events there were two-way ties for second, which resulted in two silver medals and no bronze medals being awarded in each event. Lastly, in the women's uneven bars, there was a three-way tie for third, which resulted in three bronze medals being awarded.

* Host nation (Soviet Union)

1980 Summer Olympics medal table
Rank	NOC	Gold	Silver	Bronze	Total
1	Soviet Union*	80	69	46	195
2	East Germany	47	37	42	126
3	Bulgaria	8	16	17	41
4	Cuba	8	7	5	20
5	Italy	8	3	4	15
6	Hungary	7	10	15	32
7	Romania	6	6	13	25
8	France	6	5	3	14
9	Great Britain	5	7	9	21
10	Poland	3	14	15	32
11	Sweden	3	3	6	12
12	Finland	3	1	4	8
13	Czechoslovakia	2	3	9	14
14	Yugoslavia	2	3	4	9
15	Australia	2	2	5	9
16	Denmark	2	1	2	5
17	Brazil	2	0	2	4
17	Ethiopia	2	0	2	4
19	Switzerland	2	0	0	2
20	Spain	1	3	2	6
21	Austria	1	2	1	4
22	Greece	1	0	2	3
23	Belgium	1	0	0	1
23	India	1	0	0	1
23	Zimbabwe	1	0	0	1
26	North Korea	0	3	2	5
27	Mongolia	0	2	2	4
28	Tanzania	0	2	0	2
29	Mexico	0	1	3	4
30	Netherlands	0	1	2	3
31	Ireland	0	1	1	2
32	Uganda	0	1	0	1
32	Venezuela	0	1	0	1
34	Jamaica	0	0	3	3
35	Guyana	0	0	1	1
35	Lebanon	0	0	1	1
Totals (36 entries)		204	204	223	631

== See also ==
- All-time Olympic Games medal table
- List of 1980 Summer Olympics medal winners
- 1980 Winter Olympics medal table
- 1980 Summer Paralympics medal table
