= Swimming at the 1980 Summer Olympics – Women's 400 metre individual medley =

Women's 400 metre individual medley at the Games of the XXII Olympiad
- Venue: Swimming Pool at the Olimpiysky Sports Complex
- Date: 26 July
- Competitors: 16 from 11 nations
- Winning time: 4:36.29 WR

Medalists
1st place, gold medalist(s)		Petra Schneider	East Germany
2nd place, silver medalist(s)		Sharron Davies	Great Britain
3rd place, bronze medalist(s)		Agnieszka Czopek	Poland

The women's 400 metre individual medley event at the 1980 Summer Olympics was held on 26 July at the Swimming Pool at the Olimpiysky Sports Complex.

The eventual gold medal winner, Petra Schneider, later admitted that her performance was aided by the use of steroids as part of the East German state-run doping programme.

== Records ==
Prior to this competition, the existing world and Olympic records were as follows.

World record	Tracy Caulkins (USA)	4:40.83	West Berlin, West Germany	23 August 1978
Olympic record	Ulrike Tauber (GDR)	4:42.77	Montreal, Canada	24 July 1976

The following records were established during the competition:

Date	Event	Name	Nationality	Time	Record
26 July	Final	Petra Schneider	East Germany	4:36.29	WR

== Results ==
=== Heats ===
Rank	Heat	Name	Nationality	Time	Notes
1	3	Petra Schneider	East Germany	4:46.53	Q
2	3	Agnieszka Czopek	Poland	4:49.04	Q
3	3	Magdalena Białas	Poland	4:51.59	Q
4	2	Ulrike Tauber	East Germany	4:51.97	Q
5	2	Grit Slaby	East Germany	4:52.01	Q
6	1	Sharron Davies	Great Britain	4:52.38	Q
7	1	Olga Klevakina	Soviet Union	4:55.99	Q
8	2	Sonya Dangalakova	Bulgaria	4:56.26	Q
9	2	Christel Fechner	Belgium	4:56.92	
10	3	Ann-Sofi Roos	Sweden	4:57.13	
11	3	Lisa Curry	Australia	5:01.58	
12	1	Sarah Kerswell	Great Britain	5:03.75	
13	1	Mariana Paraschiv	Romania	5:04.56	
14	3	Irinel Panulescu	Romania	5:07.74	
15	3	Catherine Bohan	Ireland	5:21.82	
16	1	Maria Pia Ayora	Peru	5:27.19	
	1	Klára Gulyás	Hungary	DNS	
	2	Michelle Ford	Australia	DNS	
	2	Lisa Forrest	Australia	DNS	
	2	Susanne Nielsson	Denmark	DNS	

=== Final ===
Rank	Name	Nationality	Time	Notes
1st place, gold medalist(s)	Petra Schneider	East Germany	4:36.29	WR
2nd place, silver medalist(s)	Sharron Davies	Great Britain	4:46.83	
3rd place, bronze medalist(s)	Agnieszka Czopek	Poland	4:48.17	
4	Grit Slaby	East Germany	4:48.54	
5	Ulrike Tauber	East Germany	4:49.18	
6	Sonya Dangalakova	Bulgaria	4:49.25	
7	Olga Klevakina	Soviet Union	4:50.91	
8	Magdalena Białas	Poland	4:53.30	
