= Osgerby =

Osgerby may refer to:

== People ==
- Ann Osgerby (born 1963), English swimmer
- Janet Osgerby (born 1963), British swimmer

== Organizations ==
- Barber Osgerby, design studio founded in 1996 by British designers Edward Barber and Jay Osgerby
