= DiBernardo =

DiBernardo or Di Bernardo is a surname. Notable people with the surname include:

- Niccolò di Bernardo dei Machiavelli (1469-1527), Italian diplomat, politician, historian, philosopher, humanist and poet
- Francesco di Bernardo Corteccia (1502-1571), Italian composer, organist, and teacher of the Renaissance
- Francesco di Bernardo de' Vecchi Da Santacroce (1507-1545), Italian painter, active mainly in Bergamo and Venice
- Giovanni di Bernardo Rucellai (1475-1525), Italian humanist, poet, dramatist and man of letters in Renaissance Florence
- Giuliano Di Bernardo (born 1939), Italian academic, philosopher and Grand Master of GOI (1990-93)
- Alberto Di Bernardo (born 1980), an Italian/Argentine rugby union player
- Angelo DiBernardo (born 1956), North American Soccer League and Major Indoor Soccer League player
- Mauro Di Bernardo (born 1956), Italian Olympic volleyball player
- Paul DiBernardo, former American Indoor Soccer Association player
- Rick DiBernardo (born 1964), former National Football League player
- Robert DiBernardo (1937–1986), former caporegime
- Vanessa DiBernardo (born 1992), an American soccer player

== See also ==
- Bernardini
