= Belgium at the 1980 Summer Olympics =

- Flag of the Olympic Movement
- IOC code: BEL
- NOC: Belgian Olympic and Interfederal Committee
- Website: www.teambelgium.be (in Dutch and French)

in Moscow
- Competitors: 59 (43 men and 16 women) in 10 sports
- Medals Ranked 23rd: Gold 1 Silver 0 Bronze 0 Total 1

Summer Olympics appearances (overview)
- 1900; 1904; 1908; 1912; 1920; 1924; 1928; 1932; 1936; 1948; 1952; 1956; 1960; 1964; 1968; 1972; 1976; 1980; 1984; 1988; 1992; 1996; 2000; 2004; 2008; 2012; 2016; 2020; 2024

Other related appearances
- 1906 Intercalated Games

Belgium competed at the 1980 Summer Olympics in Moscow, Russian SFSR, USSR. In partial support of the American-led boycott of the 1980 Summer Olympics, Belgium competed under the Olympic Flag instead of its national flag. 59 competitors, 43 men and 16 women, took part in 51 events in 10 sports.

== Medalists ==
=== Gold ===
- Robert Van de Walle — Judo, men's half-heavyweight (95 kg)

== Archery ==
In Belgium's third appearance in the modern archery competition, the nation was represented by two men, including 1972 and 1976 Olympic veteran Robert Cogniaux.

Men's Individual Competition:

- Robert Cogniaux — 2414 points (→ 9th place)
- Willy van den Bossche — 2384 points (→ 17th place)

== Athletics ==
Men's 400 metres

- Fons Brijdenbach
- Eddy De Leeuw
- Jacques Borlée

Men's 5,000 metres

- Emiel Puttemans
- Alex Hagelsteens

Men's 10,000 metres

- Alex Hagelsteens
  - Heat — 29:47.6 (→ did not advance)

Men's Marathon

- Karel Lismont
  - Final — 2:13:27 (→ 9th place)
- Mark Smet
  - Final — 2:16:00 (→ 13th place)
- Rik Schoofs
  - Final — 2:17:28 (→ 18th place)

Men's 4×400 metres Relay

- Eddy de Leeuw, Danny Roelandt, Rik Vandenberghe, and Fons Brijdenbach
  - Heat — did not finish (→ did not advance)

Men's High Jump

- Guy Moreau
  - Qualification — 2.21 m
  - Final — 2.18 m (→ 14th place)

Men's Pole Vault

- Patrick Desruelles
  - Qualification — no mark (→ did not advance)

Women's 200 metres

- Karin Verguts
- Lea Alaerts

Women's 400 metres

- Rosine Wallez
- Anne Michel

Women's 800 metres

- Anne-Marie Van Nuffel
  - Heat — 2:00.1
  - Semifinals — 2:02.0 (→ did not advance)

Women's 4×400 metres Relay

- Lea Alaerts
- Regina Berg
- Anne Michel
- Rosine Wallez

Women's High Jump

- Christine Soetewey
  - Qualification — 1.88 m
  - Final — 1.85 m (→ 12th place)

== Cycling ==
Twelve cyclists represented Belgium in 1980.

Individual road race

- Luc De Smet
- Jan Nevens
- Ronald Van Avermaet
- Jan Wijnants

Team time trial

- Patrick du Chau
- Marc Sergeant
- Gerrit Van Gestel
- Leo Wellens

1000m time trial

- Jan Blomme

Individual pursuit

- Joseph Smeets

Team pursuit

- Jan Blomme
- Diederik Foubert
- Jozef Simons
- Joseph Smeets

== Fencing ==
Three fencers, two men and one woman, represented Belgium in 1980.

Men's foil

- Stéphane Ganeff
- Thierry Soumagne

Men's épée

- Stéphane Ganeff
- Thierry Soumagne

Women's foil

- Micheline Borghs

== Swimming ==
Men's 100m Backstroke

- Franky De Groote
  - Heats — 1:00.35 (→ did not advance)

Men's 200m Backstroke

- Franky De Groote
  - Heats — 2:06.97 (→ did not advance)

Men's 400m individual medley

- Franky De Groote
  - Heats — 4:36.99 (→ did not advance)

Women's 100m Freestyle

- Carine Verbauwen
  - Heats — 59.08 (→ did not advance)

Women's 200m Freestyle

- Pascale Verbauwen
  - Heats — 2:05.34 (→ did not advance)

Women's 400m Freestyle

- Pascale Verbauwen
  - Heats — 4:18.98 (→ did not advance)

Women's 800m Freestyle

- Pascale Verbauwen
  - Final — 8.44,84 (→ 6th place)

Women's 100m Backstroke

- Carine Verbauwen
  - Final — 1.03,82 (→ 5th place)

Women's 200m Backstroke

- Yolande van der Straeten
  - Final — 2.15,58 (→ 5th place)
- Carine Verbauwen
  - Final — 2.16,66 (→ 6th place)

Women's 100m Breaststroke

- Brigitte Bosmans
  - Heats — 1:07.81 (→ did not advance)

Women's 200m Breaststroke

- Brigitte Bosmans
  - Heats — 2:42.87 (→ did not advance)

Women's 100m Butterfly

- Marion Michel
  - Heats — 1:16.68 (→ did not advance)

Women's 200m Butterfly

- Marion Michel
  - Heats — 2:25.10 (→ did not advance)

Women's 400 m Individual Medley

- Christel Fechner
  - Heats — 4:56.92 (→ did not advance)

Women's 4 × 100 m Medley Relay

- Yolande van der Straeten, Brigitte Bosmans, Carine Verbauwen, and Pascale Verbauwen
  - Heats — 4.26,33 (→ did not advance)
