= 1982 World Fencing Championships =

International fencing competition

1982 World Championships in Fencing
- Host city: Rome, Italy

The 1982 World Fencing Championships were held in Rome, Italy. The event took place from July 15 to July 24, 1982.

== Medal table ==
* Host nation (Italy)

Rank	Nation	Gold	Silver	Bronze	Total
1	Soviet Union (URS)	4	1	1	6
2	Hungary (HUN)	2	1	3	6
3	Italy (ITA)*	1	3	2	6
4	France (FRA)	1	2	0	3
5	Switzerland (SUI)	0	1	0	1
6	East Germany (GDR)	0	0	1	1
6	West Germany (FRG)	0	0	1	1
Totals (7 entries)		8	8	8	24

== Medal summary ==
=== Men's events ===
Event	Gold	Silver	Bronze
Individual Foil	(Soviet Union) Alexandr Romankov	(Italy) Mauro Numa	(Italy) Federico Cervi
Team Foil	Soviet Union	France	Italy
Individual Sabre	(Soviet Union) Viktor Krovopuskov	(Soviet Union) Andrey Alshan	(Hungarian People's Republic) Imre Gedővári
Team Sabre	(Hungarian People's Republic) Hungary	Italy	Soviet Union
Individual Épée	(Hungarian People's Republic) Jenő Pap	(France) Philippe Riboud	(Hungarian People's Republic) Ernő Kolczonay
Team Épée	France	Switzerland	(Hungarian People's Republic) Hungary

=== Women's events ===
Event	Gold	Silver	Bronze
Individual Foil	(Soviet Union) Nailya Gilyazova	(Italy) Dorina Vaccaroni	(East Germany) Mandy Niklaus
Team Foil	Italy	(Hungarian People's Republic) Hungary	West Germany
