= Fencing at the 1979 Mediterranean Games =

Fencing competition

- Location: Split, Yugoslavia
- Dates: September 1979

The fencing competition at the 1979 Mediterranean Games was held in Split, Yugoslavia.

== Medalists ==
=== Men's events ===
Event	Gold	Silver	Bronze
Individual épée	Philippe Riboud (FRA)	Marco Falcone (ITA)	Hubert Gardas (FRA)
Individual foil	Didier Flament (FRA)	Tahar Hamou (ALG)	Bruno Boscherie (FRA)
Individual sabre	Michele Maffei (ITA)	Mario Aldo Montano (ITA)	Pascal Gaudet (FRA)

=== Women's events ===
Event	Gold	Silver	Bronze
Individual foil	Brigitte Latrille (FRA)	Anna Rita Sparaciari (ITA)	Dorina Vaccaroni (ITA)

== Medal table ==
Rank	Nation	Gold	Silver	Bronze	Total
1	France (FRA)	3	0	3	6
2	Italy (ITA)	1	3	1	5
3	Algeria (ALG)	0	1	0	1
Totals (3 entries)		4	4	4	12
