= Cornelia Polit =

East German swimmer

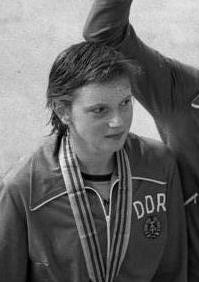
- Cornelia Polit in 1980

Personal information
- Nationality: East Germany
- Born: 18 February 1963 (age 63) Teutschenthal, East Germany
- Height: 1.76 m (5 ft 9 in)
- Weight: 63 kg (139 lb)

Sport
- Sport: Swimming
- Strokes: Backstroke; Butterfly
- Club: SV Halle
Medal record
Representing East Germany
Olympic Games
Silver medal – second place	1980 Moscow	200 m backstroke
European Championships
Gold medal – first place	1981 Split	200 m backstroke
Gold medal – first place	1983 Rome	200 m butterfly
Silver medal – second place	1981 Split	100 m backstroke
Silver medal – second place	1983 Rome	100 m butterfly

Cornelia Polit (later Embacher, born 18 February 1963) is a former swimmer from East Germany. At age seventeen she won the silver medal in the women's 200 m backstroke at the 1980 Summer Olympics, behind her teammate Rica Reinisch. She won a silver and a gold medal in the 100 m and 200 m backstroke at the 1981 European Aquatics Championships, respectively. Two years later she repeated this achievement, but in the butterfly events.
