= Belgian Sportsman of the Year =

Title granted to a male Belgian athlete

The Belgian Sportsman of the Year (Dutch: Sportman van het jaar; French: Sportif belge de l'année; German: Sportler des Jahres) is elected at the end of each year by professional sportjournalists and former winners, annually since 1967. A Belgian Sportswoman of the Year title has been given out since 1975. Top winners include Ingrid Berghmans (8 wins), Kim Clijsters (8) and Eddy Merckx (6).

More categories were added in 1997, with the Belgian Sportsteam of the Year, 1998 with the Belgian Talent of the Year, 2010 with the Belgian Paralympic Athlete of the Year and lastly in 2011 the Belgian Coach of the Year.

The youngest male winner of the Belgian sportsman of the year is Remco Evenepoel who won the award at the age of 19. The youngest female winner is Carine Verbauwen, who won the award at the age of 13.

== List of winners ==
Year	Men		Women		Team		Promising Talent		Paralympic		Coach	
Year	Winner	Sport	Winner	Sport	Winner	Sport	Winner	Sport	Winner	Sport	Winner	Sport
2025	Remco Evenepoel (5)	cycling	Emma Meesseman (2)	basketball	Belgium women's national basketball team (3)	basketball	Roos Vanotterdijk	swimming	Léa Bayekula	athletics	Vincent Kompany	football
2024	Remco Evenepoel (4)	cycling	Nafissatou Thiam (5)	athletics	Thierry Neuville and Martijn Wydaeghe	motorsport	Jarno Widar	cycling	Maxime Carabin (2)	athletics	Sven Vanthourenhout	cycling
2023	Remco Evenepoel (3)	cycling	Lotte Kopecky	cycling	Belgium women's national basketball team (2)	basketball	Alec Segaert	cycling	Maxime Carabin	athletics	Rachid Meziane	basketball
2022	Remco Evenepoel (2)	cycling	Nafissatou Thiam (4)	athletics	Men's 4×400 metres relay (4)	athletics	Cian Uijtdebroeks	cycling	Michèle George (2)	equestrian	Roger Lespagnard (3)	athletics
2021	Wout van Aert (2)	cycling	Nina Derwael (3)	gymnastics	Belgium national field hockey team (5)	field hockey	Thibau Nys	cycling	Peter Genyn (3)	athletics	Shane McLeod (2)	field hockey
2020	Wout van Aert	cycling	Emma Meesseman	basketball	Belgium women's national basketball team	basketball	Charles De Ketelaere	football	Joachim Gérard (3)	tennis	Philip Mestdagh	basketball
2019	Remco Evenepoel	cycling	Nina Derwael (2)	gymnastics	Belgium national field hockey team (4)	field hockey	Yari Verschaeren	football	Joachim Gérard (2)	tennis	Shane McLeod	field hockey
2018	Eden Hazard	football	Nina Derwael (1)	gymnastics	Belgium national field hockey team (3)	field hockey	Remco Evenepoel	cycling	Peter Genyn (2)	athletics	Roberto Martinez	football
2017	David Goffin	tennis	Nafissatou Thiam (3)	athletics	Belgium Davis Cup team (3)	tennis	Lotte Kopecky	cycling	Peter Genyn	athletics	Roger Lespagnard (2)	athletics
2016	Greg Van Avermaet	cycling	Nafissatou Thiam (2)	athletics	Belgium national field hockey team (2)	field hockey	Louise Carton	athletics	Laurens Devos	table tennis	Roger Lespagnard	athletics
2015	Kevin De Bruyne	football	Delfine Persoon	boxing	Belgium Davis Cup team (2)	tennis	Tiesj Benoot	cycling	Marieke Vervoort (2)	athletics	Hein Vanhaezebrouck	football
2014	Thibaut Courtois	football	Nafissatou Thiam	athletics	Belgium national football team (2)	football	Divock Origi	football	Michèle George	equestrian	Marc Wilmots (2)	football
2013	Frederik Van Lierde	triathlon	Kirsten Flipkens	tennis	Belgium national football team	football	Nafissatou Thiam	athletics	Joachim Gérard (1)	tennis	Marc Wilmots	football
2012	Tom Boonen (3)	cycling	Evi Van Acker	sailing	Belgium national field hockey team	field hockey	Kimmer Coppejans	tennis	Marieke Vervoort	athletics	Jacques Borlée (2)	athletics
2011	Philippe Gilbert (3)	cycling	Kim Clijsters (8)	tennis	Men's 4×400 metres relay (3)	athletics	Thomas Van der Plaetsen	athletics	Wim Decleir	cycling	Jacques Borlée	athletics
2010	Philippe Gilbert (2)	cycling	Kim Clijsters (7)	tennis	Men's 4×400 metres relay (2)	athletics	Luca Brecel	snooker	Sven Decaesstecker	swimming	not awarded	
2009	Philippe Gilbert	cycling	Kim Clijsters (6)	tennis	Men's 4×400 metres relay	athletics	Romelu Lukaku	football	not awarded		not awarded	
2008	Sven Nys	cyclo-cross	Tia Hellebaut	athletics	Women's 4×100 metres relay (3)	athletics	Elise Matthysen	swimming	not awarded		not awarded	
2007	Tom Boonen (2)	cycling	Justine Henin-Hardenne (4)	tennis	Women's 4×100 metres relay (2)	athletics	Dominique Cornu	cycling	not awarded		not awarded	
2006	Stefan Everts (5)	motocross	Justine Henin-Hardenne (3)	tennis	Belgium Fed Cup team (2)	tennis	Yoris Grandjean	swimming	not awarded		not awarded	
2005	Tom Boonen	cycling	Kim Clijsters (5)	tennis	Belgium national under-21 football team	football	Niels Albert	cyclo-cross	not awarded		not awarded	
2004	Stefan Everts (4)	motocross	Justine Henin-Hardenne (2)	tennis	Women's 4×100 metres relay	athletics	Aagje Vanwalleghem	gymnastics	not awarded		not awarded	
2003	Stefan Everts (3)	motocross	Justine Henin-Hardenne	tennis	Belgian Motocross team (2)	motocross	Kirsten Flipkens	tennis	not awarded		not awarded	
2002	Stefan Everts (2)	motocross	Kim Clijsters (4)	tennis	La Villette Charleroi	table tennis	Thomas Buffel	football	not awarded		not awarded	
2001	Stefan Everts	motocross	Kim Clijsters (3)	tennis	Belgium Fed Cup team	tennis	Jurgen Van den Broeck	cycling	not awarded		not awarded	
2000	Joël Smets	motocross	Kim Clijsters (2)	tennis	RSC Anderlecht	football	Bart Aernouts	cyclo-cross	not awarded		not awarded	
1999	Luc Van Lierde (2)	triathlon	Kim Clijsters	tennis	Belgium Davis Cup team	tennis	Bart Wellens	cyclo-cross	not awarded		not awarded	
1998	Frédérik Deburghgraeve (3)	swimming	Dominique Monami	tennis	Belgian Motocross team	motocross	Kim Clijsters	tennis	not awarded		not awarded	
1997	Luc Van Lierde	triathlon	Gella Vandecaveye (2)	judo	Noliko Maaseik	volleyball	not awarded		not awarded		not awarded	
1996	Frédérik Deburghgraeve (2)	swimming	Ulla Werbrouck	judo	not awarded		not awarded		not awarded		not awarded	
1995	Frédérik Deburghgraeve	swimming	Brigitte Becue (2)	swimming	not awarded		not awarded		not awarded		not awarded	
1994	Jean-Michel Saive (2)	table tennis	Brigitte Becue	swimming	not awarded		not awarded		not awarded		not awarded	
1993	Vincent Rousseau (2)	athletics	Gella Vandecaveye	judo	not awarded		not awarded		not awarded		not awarded	
1992	Georges Jobé (2)	motocross	Annelies Bredael	rowing	not awarded		not awarded		not awarded		not awarded	
1991	Jean-Michel Saive	table tennis	Sabine Appelmans (2)	tennis	not awarded		not awarded		not awarded		not awarded	
1990	Rudy Dhaenens	cycling	Sabine Appelmans	tennis	not awarded		not awarded		not awarded		not awarded	
1989	Thierry Boutsen	motorsport	Ingrid Berghmans (8)	judo	not awarded		not awarded		not awarded		not awarded	
1988	Eric Geboers	motocross	Ingrid Berghmans (7)	judo	not awarded		not awarded		not awarded		not awarded	
1987	Georges Jobé	motocross	Ingrid Lempereur	swimming	not awarded		not awarded		not awarded		not awarded	
1986	William Van Dijck	athletics	Ingrid Berghmans (6)	judo	not awarded		not awarded		not awarded		not awarded	
1985	Gaston Rahier; Vincent Rousseau	motocross athletics	Ingrid Berghmans (5)	judo	not awarded		not awarded		not awarded		not awarded	
1984	Claude Criquielion	cycling	Ingrid Berghmans (4)	judo	not awarded		not awarded		not awarded		not awarded	
1983	Eddy Annys	athletics	Ingrid Berghmans (3)	judo	not awarded		not awarded		not awarded		not awarded	
1982	Jacky Ickx	motorsport	Ingrid Berghmans (2)	judo	not awarded		not awarded		not awarded		not awarded	
1981	Freddy Maertens	cycling	Annie Lambrechts	roller skating	not awarded		not awarded		not awarded		not awarded	
1980	Robert Van De Walle (2)	judo	Ingrid Berghmans	judo	not awarded		not awarded		not awarded		not awarded	
1979	Robert Van De Walle	judo	Carine Verbauwen (3)	swimming	not awarded		not awarded		not awarded		not awarded	
1978	Raymond Ceulemans	billiards	Carine Verbauwen (2)	swimming	not awarded		not awarded		not awarded		not awarded	
1977	Michel Pollentier	cycling	Anne-Marie Pira (2)	athletics	not awarded		not awarded		not awarded		not awarded	
1976	Ivo Van Damme	athletics	Anne-Marie Pira	athletics	not awarded		not awarded		not awarded		not awarded	
1975	Bruno Brokken	athletics	Carine Verbauwen	swimming	not awarded		not awarded		not awarded		not awarded	
1974	Eddy Merckx (6)	cycling	not awarded		not awarded		not awarded		not awarded		not awarded	
1973	Eddy Merckx (5)	cycling	not awarded		not awarded		not awarded		not awarded		not awarded	
1972	Eddy Merckx (4)	cycling	not awarded		not awarded		not awarded		not awarded		not awarded	
1971	Eddy Merckx (3)	cycling	not awarded		not awarded		not awarded		not awarded		not awarded	
1970	Eddy Merckx (2)	cycling	not awarded		not awarded		not awarded		not awarded		not awarded	
1969	Eddy Merckx	cycling	not awarded		not awarded		not awarded		not awarded		not awarded	
1968	Serge Reding	weightlifting	not awarded		not awarded		not awarded		not awarded		not awarded	
1967	Ferdinand Bracke	cycling	not awarded		not awarded		not awarded		not awarded		not awarded	

== Breakdown of winners by sport ==
=== Men ===
Sport	Number of wins	Winning years
Cycling	25	1967, 1969, 1970, 1971, 1972, 1973, 1974, 1977, 1981, 1984, 1990, 2005, 2007, 2009, 2010, 2011, 2012, 2016, 2019, 2020, 2021, 2022, 2023, 2024, 2025
Motocross	10	1985, 1987, 1988, 1992, 2000, 2001, 2002, 2003, 2004, 2006
Athletics	6	1975, 1976, 1983, 1985, 1986, 1993
Swimming	3	1995, 1996, 1998
Triathlon	3	1997, 1999, 2013
Football	3	2014, 2015, 2018
Judo	2	1979, 1980
Motorsport	2	1982, 1989
Table tennis	2	1991, 1994
Weightlifting	1	1968
Billiards	1	1978
Cyclo-cross	1	2008
Tennis	1	2017

=== Women ===
Sport	Number of wins	Winning years
Tennis	16	1990, 1991, 1998, 1999, 2000, 2001, 2002, 2003, 2004, 2005, 2006, 2007, 2009, 2010, 2011, 2013
Judo	11	1980, 1982, 1983, 1984, 1985, 1986, 1988, 1989, 1993, 1996, 1997
Athletics	8	1976, 1977, 2008, 2014, 2016, 2017, 2022, 2024
Swimming	6	1975, 1978, 1979, 1987, 1994, 1995
Gymnastics	3	2018, 2019, 2021
Basketball	2	2020, 2025
Roller skating	1	1981
Rowing	1	1992
Sailing	1	2012
Boxing	1	2015
Cycling	1	2023

=== Team ===
Sport	Number of wins	Winning years
Athletics	7	2004, 2007, 2008, 2009, 2010, 2011, 2022
Tennis	5	1999, 2001, 2006, 2015, 2017
Field hockey	5	2012, 2016, 2018, 2019, 2021
Football	4	2000, 2005, 2013, 2014
Basketball	3	2020, 2023, 2025
Motocross	2	1998, 2003
Volleyball	1	1997
Table tennis	1	2002
Motorsport	1	2024

=== Talent ===
Sport	Number of wins	Winning years
Cycling	9	2001, 2007, 2015, 2017, 2018, 2021, 2022, 2023, 2024
Football	5	2002, 2009, 2014, 2019, 2020
Cyclo-cross	3	1999, 2000, 2005
Tennis	3	1998, 2003, 2012
Athletics	3	2011, 2013, 2016
Swimming	3	2006, 2008, 2025
Gymnastics	1	2004
Snooker	1	2010

=== Paralympic ===
Sport	Number of wins	Winning years
Athletics	8	2012, 2015, 2017, 2018, 2021, 2023, 2024, 2025
Tennis	3	2013, 2019, 2020
Equestrian	2	2014, 2022
Swimming	1	2010
Cycling	1	2011
Table tennis	1	2016

=== Coach ===
Sport	Number of wins	Winning years
Athletics	5	2011, 2012, 2016, 2017, 2022
Football	5	2013, 2014, 2015, 2018, 2025
Field hockey	2	2019, 2021
Basketball	2	2020, 2023
Cycling	1	2024

=== Overall ===
Sport	Total number of wins	Men	Women	Team	Talent	Paralympic	Coach	First win	Last win
Athletics	37	6	8	8	2	8	5	1975	2025
Cycling	37	25	1	0	9	1	1	1967	2025
Tennis	28	1	16	5	3	3	0	1990	2020
Football	17	3	0	4	5	0	5	2000	2025
Judo	13	2	11	0	0	0	0	1979	1997
Swimming	13	3	6	0	3	1	0	1975	2025
Motocross	12	10	0	2	0	0	0	1985	2006
Field hockey	7	0	0	5	0	0	2	2012	2021
Basketball	7	0	2	3	0	0	2	2020	2025
Cyclo-cross	4	1	0	0	3	0	0	1999	2008
Table tennis	4	2	0	1	0	1	0	1991	2016
Gymnastics	4	0	3	0	1	0	0	2004	2021
Triathlon	3	3	0	0	0	0	0	1997	2013
Motorsport	3	2	0	1	0	0	0	1982	2024
Equestrian	2	0	0	0	0	2	0	2014	2022
Billiards	1	1	0	0	0	0	0	1978	
Boxing	1	0	1	0	0	0	0	2015	
Roller skating	1	0	1	0	0	0	0	1981	
Rowing	1	0	1	0	0	0	0	1992	
Sailing	1	0	1	0	0	0	0	2012	
Snooker	1	0	0	0	1	0	0	2010	
Volleyball	1	0	0	1	0	0	0	1997	
Weightlifting	1	1	0	0	0	0	0	1968	

== See also ==
- Belgian Sports Personality of the Year
