= Christiane Knacke =

East German swimmer

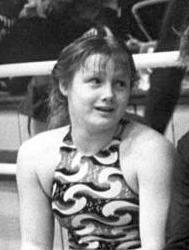
- Christiane Knacke in 1978

Personal information
- Born: 17 April 1962 (age 64) Berlin, Germany
- Height: 1.64 m (5 ft 5 in)
- Weight: 60 kg (130 lb)

Sport
- Sport: Swimming
- Club: SC Dynamo Berlin
Medal record
Women's swimming
Representing East Germany
Olympic Games
Bronze medal – third place	1980 Moscow	100 m butterfly
European Championships
Silver medal – second place	1977 Jönköping	100 m butterfly

Christiane Knacke (later Driesener then Sommer, born 17 April 1962) is a retired swimmer from East Germany who specialized in the 100 m butterfly. In this event she won a silver medal at the 1977 European Aquatics Championships and a bronze medal at the 1980 Summer Olympics. She was the first woman to break the one-minute barrier in the event, when she clocked 59.78 on 28 August 1977, setting a new world record.

In 1989 she admitted to using performance-enhancing drugs against her will.

She married twice, changing her last name to Driesener and then to Sommer. Her daughter Jennifer was born in 1983.

Records
Preceded by (East Germany) Kornelia Ender	Women's 100 metre butterfly world record holder (long course); 28 August 1977 – 3 July 1978	Succeeded by (East Germany) Andrea Pollack
