= Grit Slaby =

German swimmer

Personal information
- Born: 18 May 1965 (age 61) Borna, East Germany

Sport
- Sport: Swimming

Grit Slaby (born 18 May 1965) is a German swimmer. She competed in the women's 400 metre individual medley at the 1980 Summer Olympics for East Germany, missing out on the bronze medal by 0.37 seconds.
