= Margaret Kelly (swimmer) =

English swimmer (born 1956)

Personal information
- Full name: Margaret Mary Kelly
- Nickname: "Maggie"
- National team: Great Britain
- Born: 22 September 1956 (age 69) Liverpool, England
- Height: 1.70 m (5 ft 7 in)
- Weight: 57 kg (126 lb; 9.0 st)

Sport
- Sport: Swimming
- Strokes: Breaststroke
- Club: Wigan SC
Medal record
Women's swimming
Representing Great Britain
Olympic Games
Silver medal – second place	1980 Moscow	4×100 m medley
World Championships (LC)
Bronze medal – third place	1978 Berlin	100 m breaststroke
Representing England
Commonwealth Games
Silver medal – second place	1978 Edmonton	100 m breaststroke
Bronze medal – third place	1978 Edmonton	200 m breaststroke
Bronze medal – third place	1978 Edmonton	4×100 m medley

Margaret Mary Kelly, MBE (born 22 September 1956), later known by her married name Margaret Hohmann, is an English former competitive swimmer who represented Great Britain in the Olympics and FINA world championships, and competed for England in the Commonwealth Games.

== Swimming career ==
Kelly competed in the 1976 and 1980 Summer Olympics, winning a silver medal in 1980 in the women's 4×100-metre medley relay alongside teammates Helen Jameson, Ann Osgerby and June Croft. At the 1976 Games she had competed in the 100-metre breaststroke, 200-metre breaststroke, and 4×100-metre medley relay, reaching the final in all three events. In 1980 she swam just the 100-metre breaststroke in addition to the relay medal-winning swim, where she finished fourth in the final in a time of 1:11.48. She came out of retirement to compete at the 1988 Summer Olympics in Seoul, after giving birth to her first child, Robbie.

She represented England in the backstroke events and the medley relay, at the 1974 British Commonwealth Games in Christchurch, New Zealand. Four years later she represented England again and won a silver medal in the 100 metres breaststroke and two bronze medals in the 200 metres breaststroke and medley relay, at the 1978 Commonwealth Games in Edmonton, Alberta, Canada. As Margaret Hohmann she was selected for the England team again in the breaststroke events, at the 1990 Commonwealth Games in Auckland, New Zealand. She went on to swim at her third Commonwealth Games in 1990 and was a finalist in the women's 100-metre breaststroke at the age of 33.

Kelly won the ASA National Championship title in the 100 metres breaststroke (1976, 1977, 1978 1980) and the title in the 200 metres breaststroke (1977, 1978, 1980). She also won the 1973 100 metres backstroke title.

== Coaching ==
She has coached the University of Nottingham swim team and is now Senior Performance coach at Nottingham Leander Swimming Club.

== Personal life ==
She now lives in Nottingham, has three children Robbie, Suki and Georgia, Kelly worked for Nottingham Community Housing Association in resident involvement and now coaches at Nottingham Leander Swimming Club.

== See also ==
- List of Olympic medalists in swimming (women)
