= Magda Maros =

Hungarian fencer (born 1951)

Personal information
- Born: 4 October 1951 (age 74) Budapest, Hungary

Sport
- Sport: Fencing
Medal record
Women's fencing
Representing Hungary
Olympic Games
Silver medal – second place	1980 Moscow	Foil Individual
Bronze medal – third place	1976 Montreal	Foil Team
Bronze medal – third place	1980 Moscow	Foil Team

Magda Maros (born 4 November 1951) is a Hungarian fencer who won three Olympic medals in the foil competitions.

She was named Hungarian Sportswoman of The Year in 1980 after having won two Olympic medals the same year.

Awards
Preceded by Andrea Mátay	Hungarian Sportswoman of The Year; 1980	Succeeded by Éva Rakusz
