= Susan Cooper (swimmer) =

British swimmer

Personal information
- Born: 24 June 1963 (age 63)

Sport
- Sport: Swimming

Susan Cooper (born 24 June 1963) is a British swimmer. She competed in the women's 100 metre butterfly at the 1980 Summer Olympics.
