= Dariusz Wolny (swimmer) =

Polish swimmer

Personal information
- Nationality: Polish
- Born: 21 March 1960 (age 66) Warsaw, Poland

Sport
- Sport: Swimming

Dariusz Wolny (born 21 March 1960) is a Polish swimmer. He competed in the men's 400 metre individual medley at the 1980 Summer Olympics.
