= Jenő Pap =

Hungarian fencer

Personal information
- Born: 15 December 1951 (age 74) Budapest, Hungary

Sport
- Sport: Fencing
Medal record
Men's fencing
Representing Hungary
World Championships
Gold medal – first place	Hamburg 1978	Team épée
Gold medal – first place	Rome 1982	Individual épée
Bronze medal – third place	Rome 1982	Team épée

Jenő Pap (born 15 December 1951) is a Hungarian fencer. He competed in the team foil and épée events at the 1980 Summer Olympics.

He was named Hungarian Sportsman of the year in 1982 for winning the individual épée event at that year's World Fencing Championships.

Awards
Preceded by Sándor Wladár	Hungarian Sportsman of The Year; 1982	Succeeded by György Guczoghy
