= Pascale Trinquet =

French fencer (born 1958)

Personal information
- Born: 11 August 1958 (age 67) Marseille, France

Sport
- Sport: Fencing
Medal record
Women's fencing
Representing France
Olympic Games
Gold medal – first place	1980 Moscow	Individual foil
Gold medal – first place	1980 Moscow	Team foil
Bronze medal – third place	1984 Los Angeles	Team foil
Summer Universiade
Gold medal – first place	1979 Mexico City	Individual foil
Bronze medal – third place	1977 Sofia	Team foil
Bronze medal – third place	1983 Edmonton	Team foil

Pascale Trinquet-Hachin (born 11 August 1958) is a French fencer and Olympic champion in foil competition.

She won a gold medal in the foil event at the 1980 Summer Olympics in Moscow. She also won a gold medal in team foil with the French team.

In an earlier event in the United States, Trinquet competed in a 1979 international invitation tournament at the New York Athletic Club, winning the women's foil with only eight touches against her while scoring 25 against her opponents.

Her elder sister Véronique Trinquet is also a former fencer and Olympic medalist. Pascale and Véronique are the daughters of a Saint-Tropez retail pharmacist, and after their sporting career was over, they owned a pharmacy in Paris 16th arrondissement.
