= Shane McLeod (field hockey) =

New Zealand field hockey coach

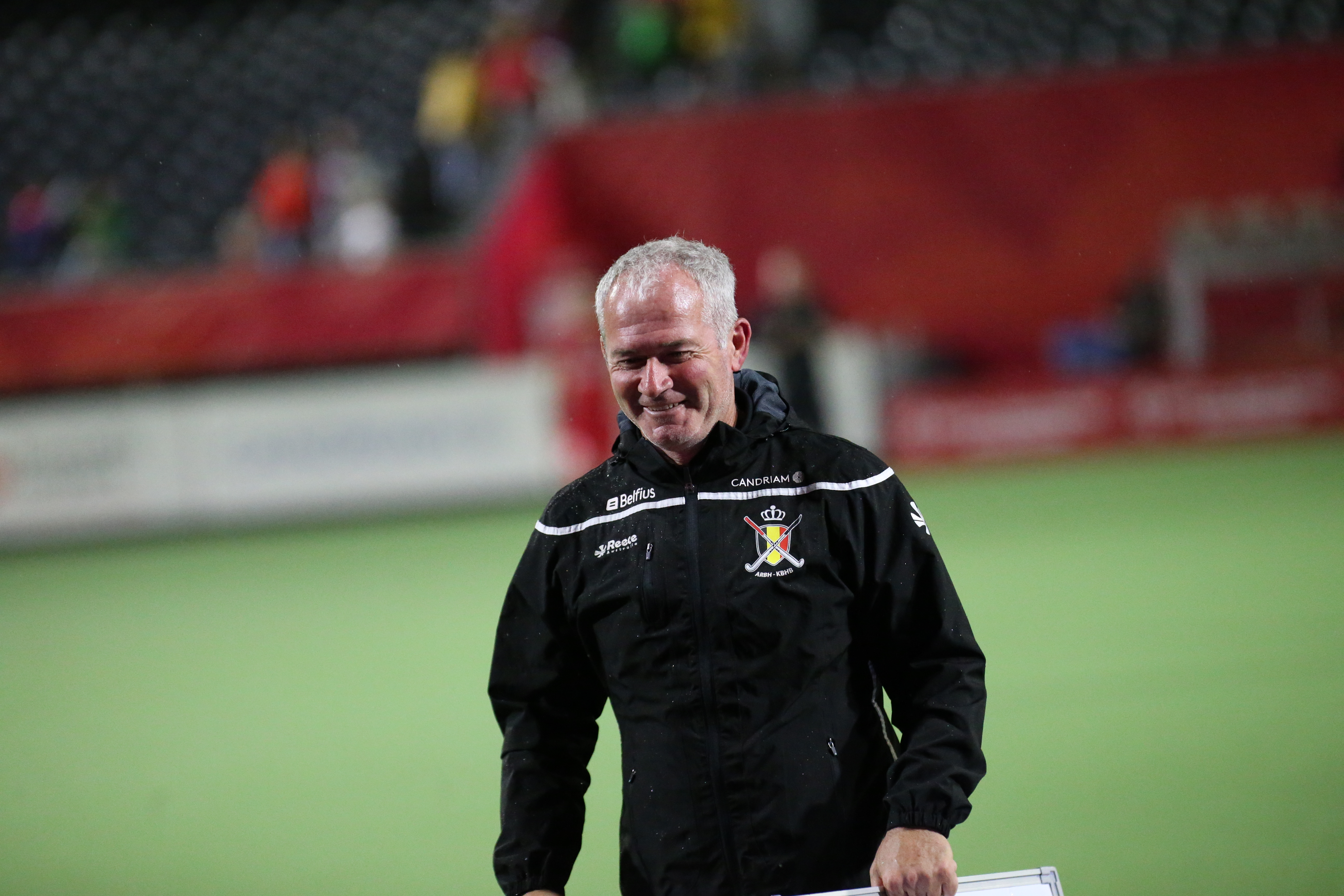

Personal information
- Born: 4 September 1968 (age 57) New Zealand

Sport
- Sport: Field hockey
Coaching career
- Years: Team
- 2008-2012: New Zealand
- 2013-2014: Belgium women's under-21
- 2018-: Belgium

Shane McLeod (born 4 September 1968) is a New Zealand field hockey coach. At the 2008 and 2012 Summer Olympics he coached the New Zealand national field hockey team. He has also coached several clubs in Belgium. At the 2016 Summer Olympics he was the head coach of the Belgium men's national field hockey team that won the silver medal. He was best coach of the year in 2017 and 2018 for his dedication with the Belgian field hockey team. He was the head coach of the Red Lions when they won the world title in 2018, the European Championship in 2019, and the Olympic title in Tokyo 2020. In 2019 he was voted best coach of the year in Belgium.
