= Tahar Hamou =

Algerian fencer (born 1959)

Personal information
- Born: 6 October 1959 (age 66)

Sport
- Sport: Fencing
Medal record
Mediterranean Games
Silver medal – second place	1979 Split	Individual foil

Tahar Hamou (born 6 October 1959) is an Algerian fencer. He competed in the individual foil event at the 1980 Summer Olympics. He won a silver medal in the individual event at the 1979 Mediterranean Games.
