= Larisa Tsagarayeva =

Soviet fencer

Personal information
- Born: 4 October 1958 (age 67) Vladikavkaz, Russia

Sport
- Sport: Fencing
Medal record
Women's fencing
Representing Soviet Union
Olympic Games
Silver medal – second place	1980 Moscow	Foil, Women's team

Larisa Tsagarayeva (born 4 October 1958) is a Soviet fencer. She won a silver medal in the women's team foil event at the 1980 Summer Olympics.
