= Ani Moneva =

Bulgarian swimmer

Personal information
- Nationality: Bulgarian
- Born: 3 March 1964 (age 62) Shumen

Sport
- Sport: Swimming
- Strokes: backstroke, butterfly

Ani Moneva (Bulgarian: Ани Монева, born 3 March 1964 in Shumen) is a Bulgarian swimmer. Over a period of 6 years, she emerged as an outstanding backstroker, setting records for the women's 100m and 200m backstroke. After this period, she successfully switched to the butterfly stroke, achieving new senior girls records in the 100m and 200m. With its participation in national and international competitions, Electroimpex became a strong representative of Bulgaria, with participation at the European level where the best German swimmers from the GDR also overcome.Her outstanding success continues in France, where she became first in 100m butterfly. Her contribution to the Bulgarian national team has not been overlooked, she competed in control events for the 1980 Moscow Olympics and qualified, taking 8th place in the 4x100 medley relay. She competed in the women's 4 × 100 metre medley relay at the 1980 Summer Olympics.
