= Elvira Vasilkova =

Belarusian swimmer

Personal information
- Born: May 15, 1962 (age 64)

Sport
- Sport: Swimming
Medal record
Representing the Soviet Union
Olympic Games
Silver medal – second place	1980 Moscow	100 m breaststroke
Bronze medal – third place	1980 Moscow	4x100 m medley relay

Elvira Vasilkova (born 15 May 1962) is a Belarusian former breaststroke swimmer who competed in the 1980 Summer Olympics.
