= Isabelle Boéri-Bégard =

French fencer (born 1960)

Personal information
- Born: 7 July 1960 (age 65) Paris, France

Sport
- Sport: Fencing
Medal record
Women's fencing
Representing France
Olympic Games
Gold medal – first place	1980 Moscow	Foil, team

Isabelle Boéri-Bégard (born 7 July 1960) is a French fencer. She won a gold medal in the women's team foil event at the 1980 Summer Olympics.
