= Anabel Drousiotou =

Cypriot swimmer (born 1966)

Personal information
- Born: 16 April 1966 (age 60)

Sport
- Sport: Swimming

Anabel Drousiotou (born 16 April 1966) is a Cypriot swimmer. She competed in the women's 100 metre backstroke at the 1980 Summer Olympics.
