= Irina Ushakova =

Soviet fencer (born 1954)

Personal information
- Born: 29 September 1954 (age 71) Gomel, Belarus

Sport
- Sport: Fencing
Medal record
Women's fencing
Representing Soviet Union
Olympic Games
Silver medal – second place	1980 Moscow	Foil, Women's team

Irina Ushakova (Belarusian: Ірына Васілеўна Ушакова; born 29 September 1954) is a Soviet fencer. She won a silver medal in the women's team foil event at the 1980 Summer Olympics.
