= Oleksandr Sydorenko =

Soviet and Ukrainian swimmer (1960–2022)

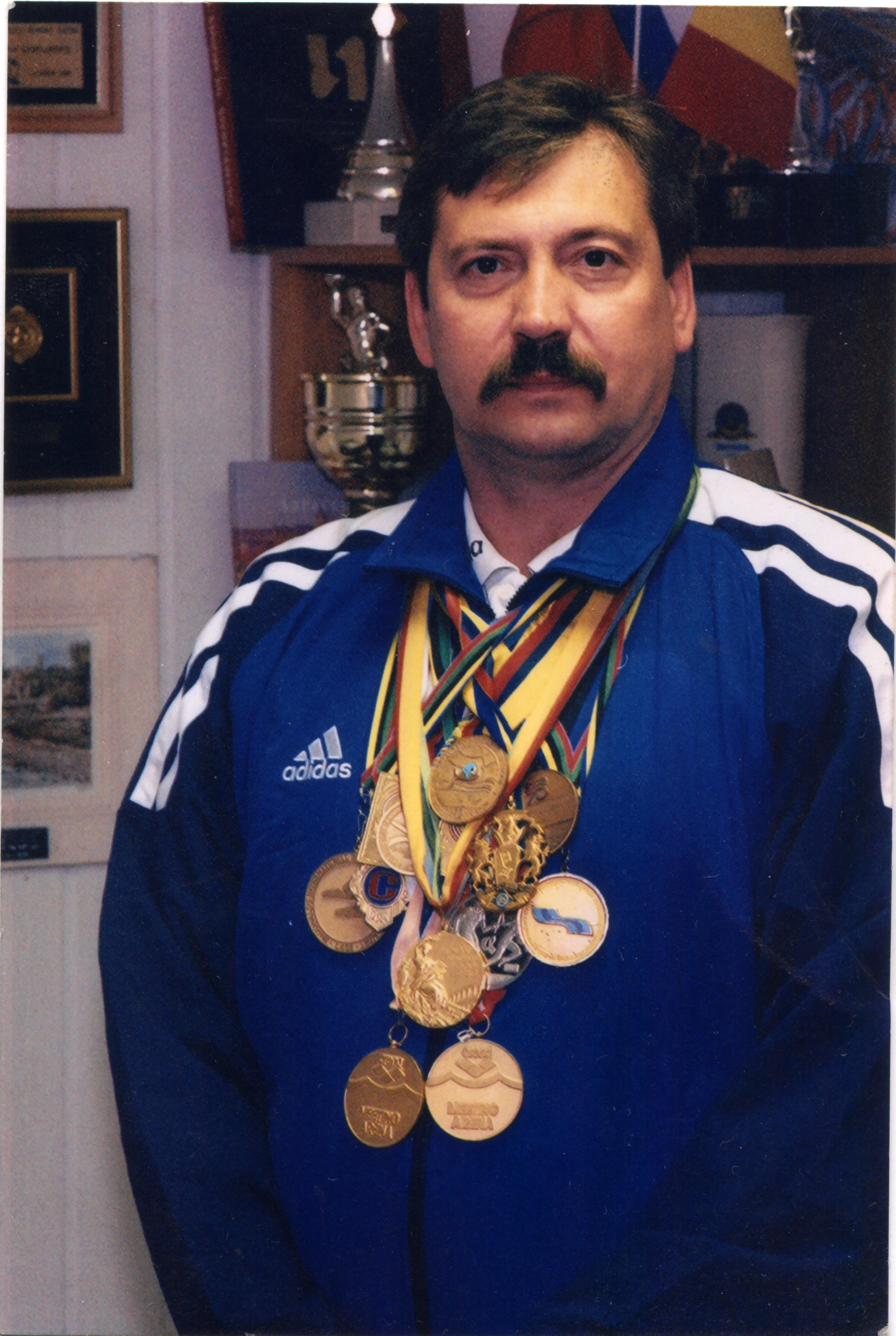
- Sydorenko in 2008

Personal information
- Full name: Oleksandr Oleksandrovych Sydorenko
- Nationality: Ukrainian
- Born: 27 May 1960 Zhdanov, Ukrainian SSR, USSR
- Died: 20 February 2022 (aged 61) Mariupol, Ukraine
- Height: 1.87 m (6 ft 2 in)
- Weight: 82 kg (181 lb)
- Spouse: Yelena Kruglova (m. 1982)

Sport
- Sport: Swimming
- Strokes: Individual medley
Medal record
Men's swimming
Representing the Soviet Union
Olympic Games
Gold medal – first place	1980 Moscow	400 m medley
World Championships (LC)
Gold medal – first place	1982 Guayaquil	200 m medley
Bronze medal – third place	1978 Berlin	200 m medley
European Championships (LC)
Gold medal – first place	1981 Split	200 m medley
Bronze medal – third place	1977 Jönköping	200 m medley
Summer Universiade
Silver medal – second place	1983 Edmonton	200 m medley
Friendship Games
Bronze medal – third place	1984 Moscow	200 metre individual medley

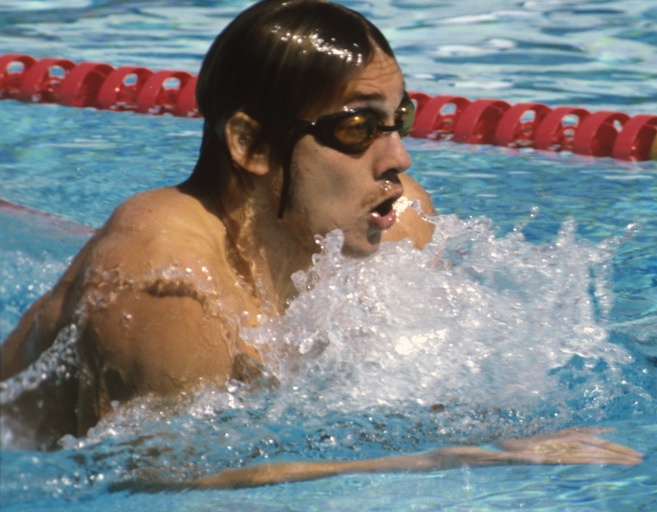
Sydorenko at the 1980 Summer Olympics

Oleksandr Sydorenko (27 May 1960 – 20 February 2022), also known as Aleksandr Sidorenko, was an individual medley swimmer from the USSR. He won the 400 m individual medley at the 1980 Summer Olympics in Moscow.

== Career ==
Sydorenko won a gold medal at the 1981 European Aquatics Championships in Split, and at the 1982 World Aquatics Championships in Guayaquil in the 200-metre individual medley.

At the 1983 Summer Universiade in Edmonton, he won a silver medal in the 200-metre individual medley. Between 1977 and 1986 he became the USSR champion 20 times.

Sydorenko won the 400 m individual medley at the 1980 Summer Olympics in Moscow.

He worked from 1987 to 2014 as the manager of the water polo team "Ilyichevets". After retirement he worked as a volunteer in the water Polo Federation of the city of Mariupol.

== Personal life and death ==
Sydorenko married the bronze medal-winner of the 1980 Olympic Games, Yelena Kruglova, in 1982. Sydorenko was awarded the Order of Friendship of Peoples (USSR).

Oleksandr Sydorenko died from COVID-19 in Mariupol on 20 February 2022, at the age of 61.

== See also ==
- World record progression 200 metres medley

Records
Preceded by (Canada) Graham Smith	Men's 200 metres individual medley world record holder (long course); 9 July 1978 – 2 August 1978	Succeeded by (United States) Steve Lundquist
