= Joseph Smeets =

Belgian cyclist

Personal information
- Born: 11 August 1959 (age 67) Liège, Belgium

Cycling career
- Sport: Cycling

Joseph Smeets (born 11 August 1959) is a Belgian former cyclist. He competed at the 1980 Summer Olympics and 1984 Summer Olympics.
