= Christel Fechner =

Belgian swimmer (born 1964)

Personal information
- Born: 25 June 1964 (age 62)

Sport
- Sport: Swimming

Christel Fechner (born 25 June 1964) is a Belgian swimmer. She competed in the women's 400 metre individual medley at the 1980 Summer Olympics. She finished 9th. Her personal best that year was 4:56.92 in the 400m Individual Medley.

== Personal life ==
Fetchner married Frans Steenhout, a journalist, in 2024. After her Olympic career, Fechner began painting.
