= Monica Bonon =

Italian swimmer

Personal information
- Born: 24 August 1964 (age 61) Casale Monferrato, Italy

Sport
- Sport: Swimming

Monica Bonon (born 24 August 1964) is an Italian former swimmer. She competed in the women's 100 metre breaststroke at the 1980 Summer Olympics.
