= Marion Michel =

Belgian swimmer

Personal information
- Born: 9 July 1964 (age 62) Eupen, Belgium

Sport
- Sport: Swimming

Marion Michel (born 9 July 1964) is a Belgian former swimmer. She competed in the women's 100 metre butterfly and women's 200 metre butterfly events at the 1980 Summer Olympics.
