= Michael Silvester =

Irish rugby union player (born 1998)

- Born: 4 June 1998 (age 28) Dublin, Republic of Ireland
- Height: 1.82 m (5 ft 11 1/2 in)
- Weight: 81 kg (179 lb; 12 st 11 lb)

Rugby union career
- Position: Wing / Fullback
Amateur team(s)
Years	Team	Apps	(Points)
2021-	Lansdowne		
Senior career
Years	Team	Apps	(Points)
2018–2021	Leinster	2	(5)
- Correct as of 28 March 2021
International career
Years	Team	Apps	(Points)
2017–2018	Ireland U20s	12	(10)
2023–	PwC Ireland	4	(85)
- Correct as of 25 October 2020

Michael Silvester (born 4 June 1998) is an Irish rugby union player. He plays for Pro14 and European Rugby Champions Cup side Leinster. Silvester won the PwC Cup of Nations on 25 June 2023 with the PwC Irish national team, and was voted man of the tournament. His preferred position is wing or Fullback.

== Leinster ==
Silvester signed an academy contract for Leinster in 2018, becoming a 3rd year academy player in August 2020. He made his Leinster debut in Round 3 of the 2020–21 Pro14 against Zebre.
