= Carine Verbauwen =

Belgian swimmer (born 1961)

Personal information
- Born: December 30, 1961 (age 64) Ghent, Belgium

Sport
- Sport: Swimming
- Strokes: Backstroke
Medal record
Representing Belgium
European Junior Championships
Silver medal – second place	1975 Geneva	800m freestyle
Silver medal – second place	1976 Oslo	100m backstroke
Silver medal – second place	1976 Oslo	200m backstroke

Carine Verbauwen (born December 30, 1961) is a Belgian swimmer. She had the best styles for the 100 and 200 meter backstroke.

Her swimming career began at the age of ten. She swam in MZV Eeklo.

In 1975, she was the first Belgium winner at the European Junior Championships with a silver medal for 800m freestyle. The next year, she also won two silver medals.

As a fourteen-year-old, she was present at the 1976 Summer Olympics in Montreal. In the Women's 4×100 meters medley, her class was not in the heats with a time of 4:30.78. She swam her 100m backstroke and did wonders in 1:07.41 yielding a Belgian record. She also performed in the 400 meter freestyle, 800 meter freestyle and the 4 x 100 meter freestyle.

At the 1980 Summer Olympics in Moscow, she won fifth place in the final of the 100m backstroke in a time of 1:03.82 and a sixth place in the final of the 200m backstroke with a time of 2:16.66. In the women's 4×100 meter medley, she managed a team of Yolande van der Straeten, Brigitte Bosmans and her sister Pascale Verbauwen but did not get beyond in the heats with a time of 4:26.33. She put her 100m butterfly set in 1:04.38. She also performed in the 100 meter freestyle.

Her time of 1:03.82 in the 100m backstroke set a Belgian record that would stand until Silke Van Hoof surpassed it in 2008 in Antwerp with an improved time of 1:02.86.

In 1975, 1978 and 1979, she was elected Belgian Sportswoman of the Year. She was thus the first woman who won the accolade in 1975. In 2000, she was in another selection of the Belgian Professional Association of Sports Journalists in sixth place as Athlete of the Century. In 2009, she was one of the top athletes in the program Eternal Fame.

Carine Verbauwen is the daughter of multiple Belgian champion swimmers Herman Verbauwen (1944) and Francine Delaunoy (Belgian champion 100m butterfly), and sister of Pascale Verbauwen, also a swimmer. Carine Verbauwen is currently the head coach at the Royal Ghent Swimming Club, training swimmers such as Rami Anis. She is mother of two children.

In 2016, Carine Verbauwen served as a coach to the Refugee Olympic Team in Rio de Janeiro, Brazil.

== 100m backstroke ==
She improved on several occasions the Belgian record time

- 20/03/1976 in Molenbeek 1:07.60
- 18/07/1976 in Montreal (Canada) 1:07.41
- 14/08/1976 in Naples (Italy) 1:06.60
- 04/03/1978 in Antwerp 1:06.33
- 07/04/1978 in Tel Aviv 1:06.26
- 08/05/1978 in Seraing 1:05.52
- 08/05/1978 in Seraing 1:05.13
- 20/08/1978 in Berlin (Germany) 1:04.78
- 18/08/1979 in Bruges 1:04.41
- 22/07/1980 in Moscow (USSR) 1:04.37
- 23/07/1980 Moscow (USSR) 1:03.82

== 200m backstroke ==
- 08/04/1974 in Molenbeek 2:29.97
- 31/08/1975 in Molenbeek 2:25.82
- 28/03/1976 in Woluwe-Saint-Lambert 2:25.70
- 15/08/1976 in Naples 2:23.30
- 19/03/1978 in Bremen (Germany) 2:23.23
- 19/03/1978 in Bremen 2:20.46
- 12/08/1979 in Utrecht (Netherlands) 2:19.63

== Awards ==
Belgian female Athlete of the Year (1975, 1978 & 1979)
