= Susanne Nielsson =

Danish swimmer

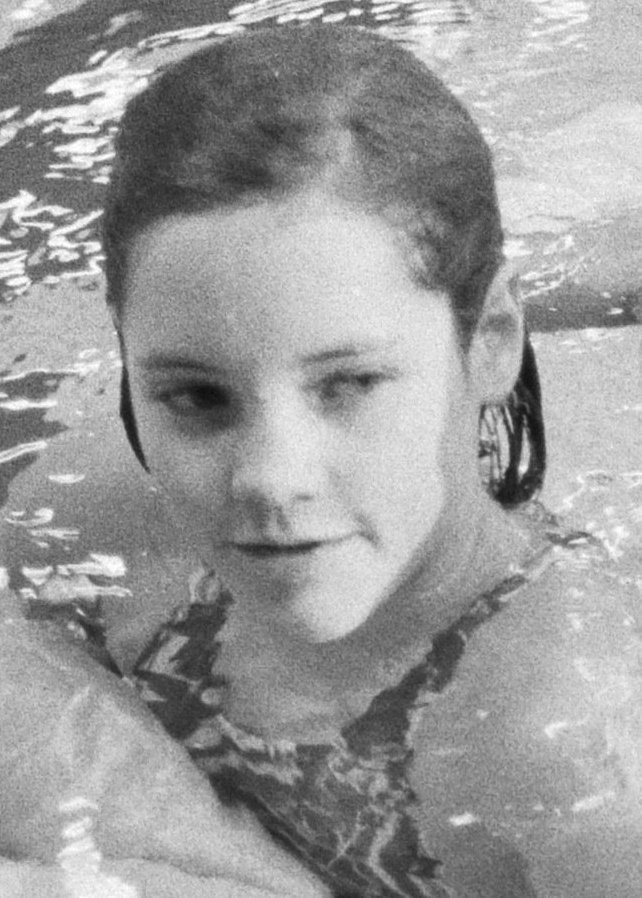
- Susanne Nielsson

Personal information
- Born: 8 Juli 1960 Aarhus, Denmark
- Height: 165 cm (5 ft 5 in)
- Weight: 60 kg (132 lb)

Sport
- Sport: Swimming
Medal record
Women's swimming
Representing Denmark
Olympic Games
Bronze medal – third place	1980 Moscow	100 m breaststroke
World Championships (LC)
Bronze medal – third place	1978 Berlin	200 m breaststroke
European Championships (LC)
Silver medal – second place	1977 Jönköping	200 m breaststroke

Susanne Schultz Nielsson (born 8 July 1960 in Århus) is a former swimmer from Denmark, who won the bronze medal in the women's 100 metres breaststroke competition at the 1980 Summer Olympics in Moscow. She represented the club AGF Aarhus.
