= Magdalena Białas =

Polish swimmer

Personal information
- Full name: Magdalena Beata Białas
- Born: 1962 (age 63–64) Kraków, Poland

Sport
- Sport: Swimming
- Strokes: Backstroke, medley

Magdalena Beata Białas (born 1962) is a Polish swimmer. She specialises in backstroke and medley swimming. She competed at the 1980 Summer Olympics in Moscow, where she placed 8th in 400 metre individual medley.
