= Agnieszka Czopek =

Polish swimmer (born 1964)

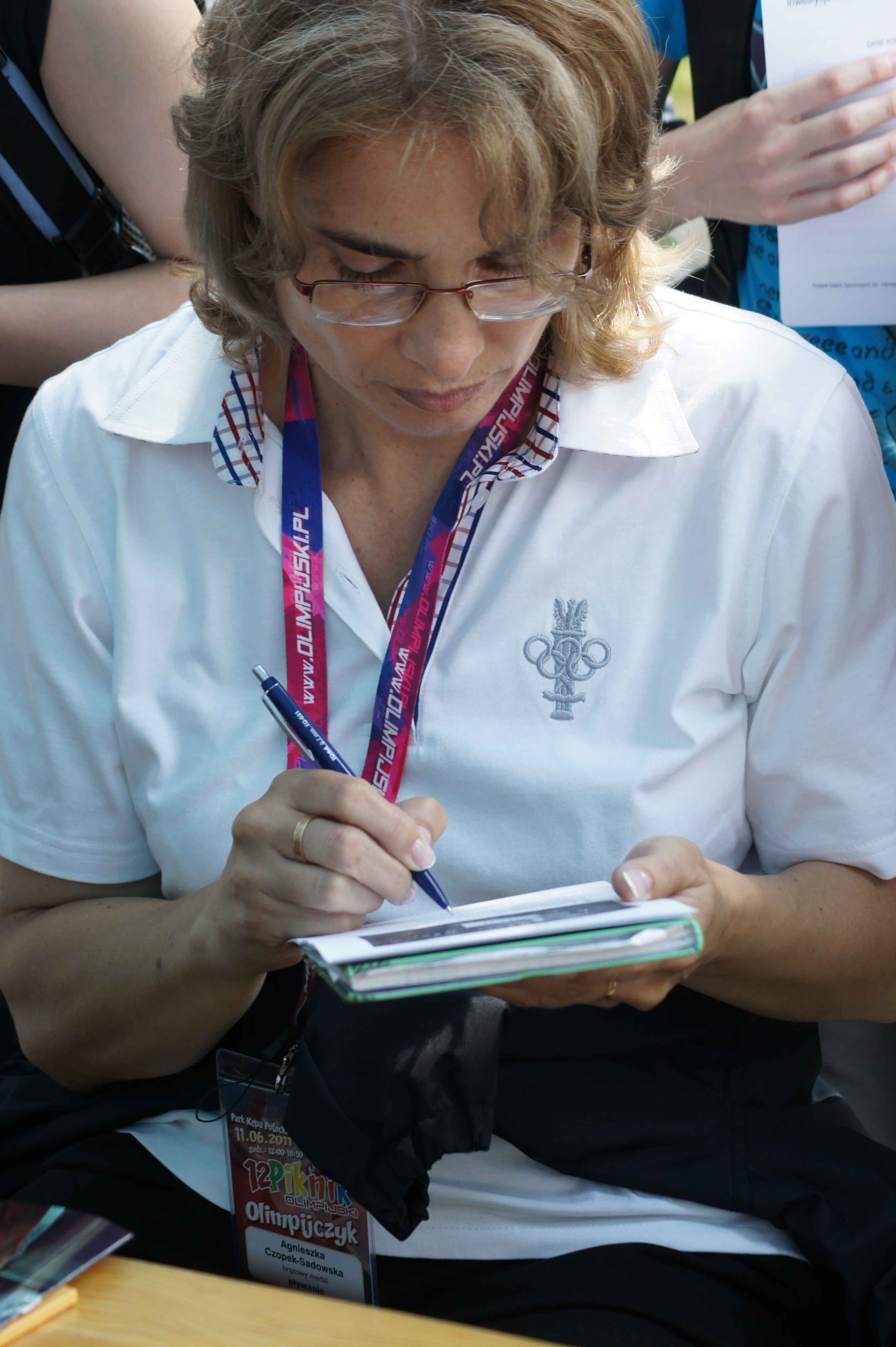
- 2011

Personal information
- Full name: Agnieszka Ewa Czopek-Sadowska
- Born: 9 January 1964 (age 62) Krzeszowice, Poland
- Height: 172 cm (5 ft 8 in)
Medal record
Women's Swimming
Representing Poland
Summer Olympics
Bronze medal – third place	1980 Moscow	400 m medley
European Championships (LC)
Bronze medal – third place	1981 Split	200 m butterfly
Bronze medal – third place	1981 Split	400 m medley

Agnieszka Ewa Czopek-Sadowska (born 9 January 1964 in Krzeszowice) is a Polish backstroke, butterfly and medley swimmer and Olympic medalist. She competed at the 1980 Summer Olympics in Moscow, winning a bronze medal in 400 metre individual medley.
