= Alfio Misaggi =

Italian water polo player

Personal information
- Nationality: Italian
- Born: 7 February 1959 (age 67) Nervi, Italy

Sport
- Sport: Water polo
Medal record
Representing Italy
World Championships
Silver medal – second place	1986 Madrid	Team competition
European Championships
Bronze medal – third place	1987 Strasbourg	Team competition
Summer Universiade
Gold medal – first place	1987 Zagreb	Team competition
Mediterranean Games
Gold medal – first place	1987 Latakia	Team competition

Alfio Misaggi (born 7 February 1959) is an Italian former water polo player. He competed at the 1980 Summer Olympics, the 1984 Summer Olympics and the 1988 Summer Olympics.

== See also ==
- List of World Aquatics Championships medalists in water polo
