= Ivano Maffei =

Italian cyclist (born 1958)

Personal information
- Born: 24 September 1958 (age 68) Pisa, Italy

Cycling career
- Sport: Cycling

Ivano Maffei (born 24 September 1958) is a retired Italian cyclist. He competed in the team time trial and the team pursuit events at the 1980 Summer Olympics.
