= Alla Grishchenkova =

Russian swimmer

Personal information
- Born: August 27, 1961 (age 64)

Sport
- Sport: Swimming
Medal record
Representing the Soviet Union
Olympic Games
Bronze medal – third place	1980 Moscow	4x100 m medley relay

Alla Grishchenkova (born 27 August 1961) is a Russian former butterfly swimmer who competed in the 1980 Summer Olympics.
