= Petra Riedel =

German swimmer

Personal information
- Nationality: East German
- Born: 17 September 1964 (age 61) Magdeburg, East Germany
- Height: 1.70 m (5 ft 7 in)
- Weight: 63 kg (139 lb)

Sport
- Sport: Swimming
- Strokes: Backstroke
- Club: SC Magdeburg
Medal record
Women's Swimming
Representing East Germany
Bronze medal – third place	1980 Moscow	100 m backstroke

Petra Riedel (born 17 September 1964 in Magdeburg) is a German former swimmer who competed in the 1980 Summer Olympics.
