= Rica Reinisch =

East German swimmer

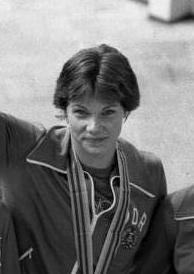
- Rika Reinisch after winning the 200 metre backstroke

Personal information
- Full name: Rika Reinisch
- Nationality: East German
- Born: 6 April 1965 (age 61) Seifhennersdorf, East Germany
- Height: 1.78 m (5 ft 10 in)
- Weight: 132 lb (60 kg)

Sport
- Sport: Swimming
- Strokes: Backstroke
- Club: Sportclub Einheit Dresden
Medal record
Women's swimming
Representing East Germany
Olympic Games
Gold medal – first place	1980 Moscow	100 m backstroke
Gold medal – first place	1980 Moscow	200 m backstroke
Gold medal – first place	1980 Moscow	4x100 m medley

Rica Reinisch (later Assmann then Neumann; born 6 April 1965) is a retired swimmer from East Germany. She was a specialist in backstroke, setting four world records in the Moscow Games (three in 100 m backstroke: 1:01.51, 1:01.50 and 1:00.86; one in 200 m backstroke 2:11.77), at the age of fifteen. She won gold medals in the 100 m and 200 m backstroke and as a member of the 4 x 100 medley relay team.

== Career ==
Reinisch was born in Seifhennersdorf, Bezirk Dresden (now Saxony), and first competed at the age of eight. Her swimming abilities earned her a place in the Dresden Sports School. At 12 years old, she had already swum the 100 m backstroke in 1:14.3. Two years later, at 14, she was ranked as the twentieth female swimmer in the world in the 100 m backstroke with 1:04.84.

In January 1980, she realized that she had the potential to become an Olympic champion. In the swimming invitational in Austin (Texas), a kind of "world female championship", she was barely beaten by the American world champion Linda Jezek (1:03.74 to 1:03.15). One month later she recorded a time of 1:02.46, better than every active swimmer, less than one second away from the world record held by her countrywoman Ulrike Richter. In the 200 m backstroke she went under 2:20 at 2:15.59. The "records route" was opened for Reinisch. The hardest was, maybe, winning the national championships where she suffered one defeat by Petra Riedel. But she improved in time for the Olympic Games. Shortly before she had swum the 100 m backstroke in 1:01.77.

== East German Doping ==
Reinisch, like many of the East German athletes of the time, was doped by her coaches under instruction from the Stasi. Swimmers were doped with oral-Turinabol, an anabolic steroid derived from testosterone. After suffering severe period pain and enlarged ovaries, her mother forced her to retire at the age of sixteen, just after the Moscow Olympics.

After the fall of the Berlin Wall and the reintegration of East Germany, records confirmed the doping scandal. By this time, Reinisch had married and had already suffered two miscarriages. Like most of the East German athletes, Reinisch was compensated in an ensuing court case on the matter. Reinisch now has two children, and was later quoted as saying: "The worst thing is they took away from me the opportunity to ever know if I could have won the gold medals without the steroids. That's the greatest betrayal of all."

== See also ==
- List of members of the International Swimming Hall of Fame
