= Katarína Lokšová-Ráczová =

Slovak fencer (born 1950)

Personal information
- Nationality: Slovak
- Born: 3 October 1950 (age 75) Košice, Czechoslovakia (now Slovakia)

Sport
- Sport: Fencing
Medal record
Representing Czechoslovakia
World Championships
Silver medal – second place	1978 Hamburg	Individual foil
Summer Universiade
Gold medal – first place	1977 Sofia	Individual foil

Katarína Lokšová-Ráczová (born 3 October 1950) is a Slovak fencer. She competed in the women's individual foil events at the 1972, 1976 and 1980 Summer Olympics.
