= Helen Jameson =

English swimmer (born 1963)

Personal information
- Full name: Helen Jameson
- National team: Great Britain
- Born: 25 September 1963 (age 62)
- Height: 1.73 m (5 ft 8 in)
- Weight: 60 kg (130 lb; 9.4 st)

Sport
- Sport: Swimming
- Strokes: Backstroke
Medal record
Women's swimming
Representing Great Britain
Olympic Games
Silver medal – second place	1980 Moscow	4×100 m medley

Helen Jameson (born 25 September 1963) is an English former competitive swimmer.

== Swimming career ==
Jameson represented Great Britain at the 1980 Summer Olympics in Moscow. She was a member of the silver-medal-winning British women's team in the 4×100-metre medley relay, swimming the backstroke leg alongside teammates Margaret Kelly, Ann Osgerby and June Croft. She also competed in the individual 100-metre backstroke and 200-metre backstroke events.

Jameson represented England in the 100 and 200 metres backstroke, at the 1982 Commonwealth Games in Brisbane, Queensland, Australia. She also won the ASA National Championship 100 metres backstroke title in 1980 and 1981.

== Personal life ==
She is the sister of Andy Jameson.

== See also ==
- Great Britain at the 1980 Summer Olympics
- List of Olympic medalists in swimming (women)
