= Dorina Vaccaroni =

Italian fencer (born 1963)

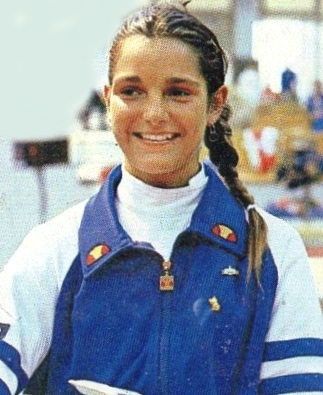
- Vaccaroni in 1986

Personal information
- Born: 24 September 1963 (age 63) Venice, Veneto, Italy
- Height: 1.70 m (5 ft 7 in)
- Weight: 57 kg (126 lb; 9 st 0 lb)

Sport
- Sport: Fencing
- Event: Foil
Medal record
Women's fencing
Representing Italy
Olympic Games
Gold medal – first place	1992 Barcelona	Foil team
Silver medal – second place	1988 Seoul	Foil team
Bronze medal – third place	1984 Los Angeles	Foil individual
World Championships
Gold medal – first place	1982 Rome	Foil Team
Gold medal – first place	1983 Vienna	Foil Individual
Gold medal – first place	1983 Vienna	Foil Team
Gold medal – first place	1990 Lyon	Foil Team
Gold medal – first place	1991 Budapest	Foil Team
Silver medal – second place	1982 Rome	Foil Individual
Bronze medal – third place	1981 Clemont-Ferrand	Foil Team
Bronze medal – third place	1987 Lausanne	Foil Team
Bronze medal – third place	1993 Essen	Foil Team
Mediterranean Games
Gold medal – first place	1983 Casablanca	Individual foil
Bronze medal – third place	1979 Split	Individual foil

Dorina Vaccaroni (born 24 September 1963) is an Italian former fencer, competing in the foil.

== Biography ==
She received a gold medal in the foil team at the 1992 Summer Olympics in Barcelona and silver at the 1988 Summer Olympics in Seoul. At the 1984 Summer Olympics in Los Angeles she received a bronze medal in individual foil. She also competed in the individual foil event at the Mediterranean Games in 1979 where she won a bronze medal and in 1983 where she won a gold medal. After her competitive fencing career she became a cyclist, participating in master competitions, most recently winning the 60-69 year old division of 2023 RAAM (Race across America). Vaccaroni is vegan and Buddhist.

== Achievements ==
Olympic Games

Year	Competition	Venue	Position	Event
1980	Olympic Games	(Soviet Union) Moscow	6th	Foil individual
1980	Olympic Games	(Soviet Union) Moscow	5th	Foil Team
1984	Olympic Games	(United States) Los Angeles	3rd	Foil individual
1984	Olympic Games	(United States) Los Angeles	4th	Foil Team
1988	Olympic Games	(South Korea) Seoul	2nd	Foil Team
1988	Olympic Games	(South Korea) Seoul	10th	Foil individual
1992	Olympic Games	(Spain) Barcelona	1st	Foil Team

== See also ==
- Italian sportswomen multiple medalists at Olympics and World Championships

Awards
Preceded by Sara Simeoni	Italian Sportswoman of the Year; 1982–1983	Succeeded by Sara Simeoni
