= Barbara Wysoczańska =

Polish fencer (born 1949)

Personal information
- Full name: Barbara Maria Wysoczańska
- Born: 12 August 1949 (age 76) Świętochłowice, Poland
- Height: 169 cm (5 ft 7 in)
- Weight: 67 kg (148 lb)

Sport
- Sport: Fencing
- Club: AZS Warszawa
Medal record
Women's fencing
Representing Poland
Olympic Games
Bronze medal – third place	1980 Moscow	Foil, individual

Barbara Maria Wysoczańska (née Szeja, born 12 August 1949) is a Polish fencer. She won a bronze medal in the women's individual foil event at the 1980 Summer Olympics.
