= Leszek Górski =

Polish swimmer (1961–2025)

Personal information
- Born: 19 August 1961 Olsztyn, Poland
- Died: 21 May 2025 (aged 63)
- Height: 1.84 m (6 ft 0 in)
- Weight: 85 kg (187 lb)
Medal record
Men's swimming
Representing Poland
European Championships
Silver medal – second place	1981 Split	400 m medley

Leszek Górski (19 August 1961 – 21 May 2025) was a Polish swimmer who won a silver medal in the 400 m individual medley at the 1981 European Aquatics Championships. He finished seventh in the same event at the 1980 Summer Olympics. During his career he won 13 national titles and set 32 national records in 50 m and 25 m pools.

In 1979 he had a serious operation on the left knee, but recovered for the Olympics. However, after a second operation in 1982, he could not perform at the international level. He retired from competitions in 1988 and became a swimming coach. He was married to Ewa Górska and had a daughter Anna (born 1983) and son Michał (born 1986). Górski lived in Wrocław, and died on 21 May 2025, at the age of 63.
