= Mitzi Ferguson =

Australian fencer

Michele Ferguson
Personal information
- Full name: Michele Ferguson
- Nickname: Mitzi
- Born: 29 September 1959 (age 66)

Sport
- Country: Australia
- Sport: Fencing

Michele "Mitzi" Ferguson (born 29 September 1959) is an Australian fencer. She competed in the women's individual foil event at the 1980 Summer Olympics.
