= Sabine Hertrampf =

German fencer

Personal information
- Born: 3 January 1955 (age 71) Oschatz, Bezirk Leipzig, East Germany

Sport
- Sport: Fencing

Sabine Hertrampf (born 3 January 1955) is a German fencer. She competed in the women's individual and team foil events for East Germany at the 1980 Summer Olympics.
