= Mandy Niklaus =

German fencer (born 1956)

Personal information
- Born: 1 March 1956 (age 70) Dresden, East Germany

Sport
- Sport: Fencing
Medal record
Women's fencing
Representing East Germany
World Championships
Bronze medal – third place	1982 Rome	Individual foil
Summer Universiade
Gold medal – first place	1979 Mexico City	Team foil
Bronze medal – third place	1979 Mexico City	Individual foil

Mandy Niklaus (née Dick, born 1 March 1956) is a German former fencer who competed for the SC Dynamo Berlin / Sportvereinigung (SV) Dynamo during her career. She won the bronze medal at the world championships by foil (fencing). She competed in the women's individual and team foil events for East Germany at the 1980 Summer Olympics.
