= Mauro Di Bernardo =

Italian volleyball player (born 1956)

Personal information
- Born: 24 March 1956 (age 70) Grottammare, Ascoli Piceno, Italy
- Height: 1.91 m (6 ft 3 in)
- Weight: 85 kg (187 lb)

Sport
- Sport: Volleyball
- Club: Virtus Sassuolo
Medal record
Representing Italy
World Championships
| Silver medal – second place | 1978 Rome | Team |

Mauro Di Bernardo (born 24 March 1956) is a retired Italian volleyball player. He was part of Italian teams that finished second at the 1978 World Championships and ninth at the 1980 Summer Olympics.
