= Yelena Kruglova =

Soviet swimmer (born 1962)

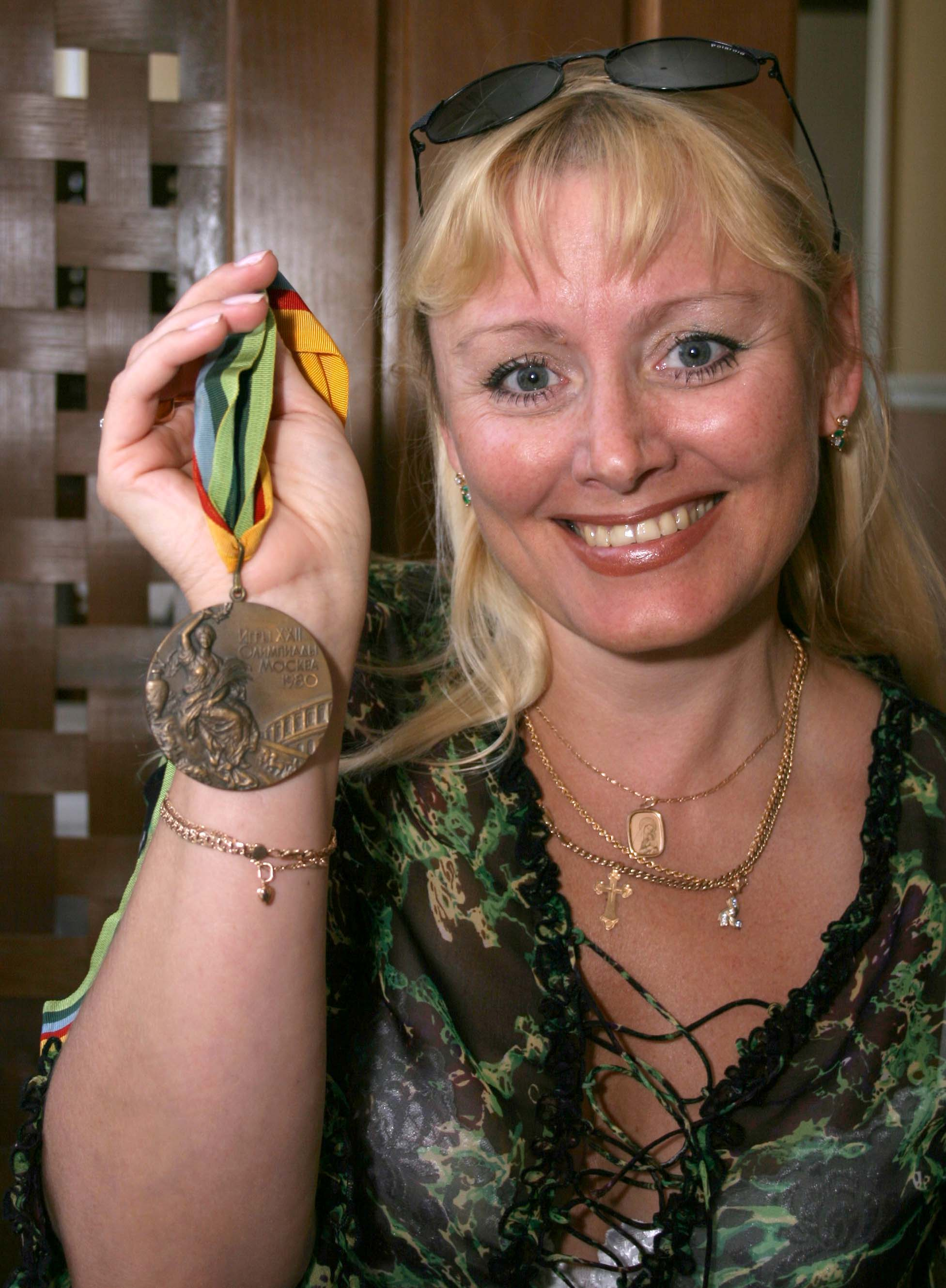
- Yelena Kruglova

Personal information
- Full name: Yelena Kruglova
- Nationality: Soviet
- Born: March 22, 1962 (age 64) Ivanovo, USSR
- Spouse: Oleksandr Sydorenko (m. 1982; died 2022)

Sport
- Sport: Swimming
- Strokes: Backstroke
Medal record
Woman’s swimming
Representing the Soviet Union
Olympic Games
Bronze medal – third place	1980 Moscow	4×100 m medley relay
World Championships (LC)
Bronze medal – third place	1978 Berlin	4×100 m medley relay

Yelena Kruglova (born March 22, 1962) is a former Soviet swimmer. She was a member of the team that won the 1980 Olympic bronze medal in the 4 × 100 m medley relay and bronze medal in the 4 × 100 m medley relay at World Championships in West Berlin, 1978.

In 1982 she married Olympic Champion Oleksandr Sydorenko.

She was awarded the Medal "For Distinguished Labour" (USSR).
