= Marlene Font =

Cuban fencer (born 1954)

Personal information
- Born: 7 February 1954 (age 72)

Sport
- Sport: Fencing

Marlene Font (born 7 February 1954) is a Cuban foil fencer. She competed at the 1976 and 1980 Summer Olympics.
