= Gabriele Janke =

German fencer

Personal information
- Born: 23 February 1956 (age 70) Magdeburg, East Germany

Sport
- Sport: Fencing

Gabriele Janke (born 23 February 1956) is a German fencer. She competed in the women's individual and team foil events for East Germany at the 1980 Summer Olympics.
