= Clara Mochi =

Italian fencer (born 1956)

Personal information
- Full name: Clara Maria Mochi
- Born: 29 April 1956 (age 70) Milan, Italy
- Height: 173 cm (5 ft 8 in)
- Weight: 59 kg (130 lb)

Sport
- Sport: Fencing

Clara Mochi (born 29 April 1956) is an Italian fencer. She competed in the women's team foil events at the 1980 and 1984 Summer Olympics.
