= Herman Verbauwen =

Belgian swimmer

Personal information
- Born: 16 May 1944 (age 82) Ghent, Belgium

Sport
- Sport: Swimming

Herman Verbauwen (born 16 May 1944) is a Belgian former freestyle and backstroke swimmer. He competed at the 1960, 1964 and the 1968 Summer Olympics.
