= Ann Brannon =

British fencer (born 1958)

Personal information
- Born: 10 October 1958 (age 67) London, England
- Height: 170 cm (5 ft 7 in)
- Weight: 60 kg (132 lb)

Sport
- Sport: Fencing

Ann Brannon (born 10 October 1958) is a British fencer. She competed at the 1980, 1984 and 1988 Summer Olympics.
