= Franky De Groote =

Belgian swimmer

Personal information
- Born: 28 June 1959 (age 67) Ostend, Belgium
- Height: 175 cm (5 ft 9 in)
- Weight: 70 kg (154 lb)

Sport
- Sport: Swimming
- Strokes: Backstroke

Franky De Groote (born 28 June 1959) is a Belgian backstroke and medley swimmer. He competed in three events at the 1980 Summer Olympics.
