= Janet Osgerby =

British swimmer (born 1963)

Personal information
- Born: 20 January 1963 (age 63) Preston, Lancashire, England

Sport
- Sport: Swimming

Janet Osgerby (born 20 January 1963) is a retired British swimmer. Osgerby competed in two events at the 1980 Summer Olympics. At the ASA National British Championships she won the 100 metres butterfly title in 1981.

Her twin sister Ann Osgerby, was also an international swimmer.
