= Nailya Gilyazova =

Soviet fencer

Personal information
- Born: 2 January 1953 (age 73) Kazan, Russian SFSR, Soviet Union

Sport
- Sport: Fencing
Medal record
Women's fencing
Representing Soviet Union
Olympic Games
Gold medal – first place	1976 Montréal	Foil, Women's team
Silver medal – second place	1980 Moscow	Foil, Women's team

Nailya Faizrakhmanovna Gilyazova (Russian: Наиля Файзрахмановна Гилязова; born 2 January 1953) is a Soviet fencer. She won a gold medal in the women's team foil event at the 1976 Summer Olympics and a silver in the same event at the 1980 Summer Olympics.
