= Ann Osgerby =

English swimmer (born 1963)

Personal information
- Born: 20 January 1963 (age 63) Preston, Lancashire, England, UK

Sport
- Sport: Swimming
- Club: Wigan SC
Medal record
Women's swimming
Representing Great Britain
Olympic Games
Silver medal – second place	1980 Moscow	4×100 m medley
Representing England
Commonwealth Games
Silver medal – second place	1982 Brisbane	4×100 m medley
Bronze medal – third place	1982 Brisbane	200 m butterfly

Ann Osgerby (born 20 January 1963), later known by her married name Ann Osgerby Inge, is an English former butterfly swimmer.

== Swimming career ==
Osgerby represented Great Britain at two consecutive Summer Olympics, starting in 1980. She also represented Great Britain at the World Championships in 1978 and 1982, Commonwealth Games 1978 and 1982, European Championships 1981 and 1983, World Cup 1979. Osgerby became the British women's team captain in 1982 and held that position for two years until retiring after the 1984 Los Angeles Olympic Games suffering from an ongoing injury of tendonitis in both shoulders.

At her Olympic debut in Moscow she won the silver medal as a member of the British women's team in the 4×100-metre medley relay, alongside June Croft, Helen Jameson, and Margaret Kelly. She is the twin sister of Janet Osgerby, who competed as a swimmer at the 1980 Summer Olympics and became the first identical twins to appear in the same Olympic final, gaining a place in the Guinness Book of World Records.

She represented England in the butterfly events, at the 1978 Commonwealth Games in Edmonton, Alberta, Canada. Four years later she represented England and won a bronze medal in the 200 metres butterfly and a silver medal in the 4 x 100 metres medley relay, at the 1982 Commonwealth Games in Brisbane, Queensland, Australia. She also won the ASA National Championship title in the 100 metres butterfly (1980, 1982, 1983) and the title in the 200 metres butterfly (1980, 1981, 1983).

== Personal life ==
Her twin sister is Janet Osgerby, who was also an international swimmer.

== See also ==
- List of Olympic medalists in swimming (women)
