= Delfina Skąpska =

Polish fencer

Personal information
- Born: 22 November 1950 (age 75) Skoczów, Poland

Sport
- Sport: Fencing

Delfina Skąpska (born 22 November 1950) is a Polish fencer. She competed in the women's individual and team foil events at the 1980 Summer Olympics.
