= Clara Alfonso =

Cuban fencer (born 1961)

Personal information
- Born: 12 August 1961 (age 64)

Sport
- Sport: Fencing

Clara Alfonso Freyre (born 12 August 1961) is a Cuban fencer. She competed in the women's individual and team foil events at the 1980 Summer Olympics.
