= Susanna Batazzi =

Italian fencer (born 1957)

Personal information
- Born: 29 August 1957 (age 68)

Sport
- Sport: Fencing

Susanna Batazzi (born 29 August 1957) is an Italian fencer. She competed at the 1976 and 1980 Summer Olympics.
