= Sabrina Seminatore =

Italian swimmer (born 1964)

Personal information
- Born: March 18, 1964 (age 62)

Sport
- Sport: Swimming
Medal record
Representing Italy
Mediterranean Games
Gold medal – first place	1983 Casablanca	100m breaststroke
Gold medal – first place	1983 Casablanca	4x100m medley relay

Sabrina Seminatore (born 18 March 1964) is an Italian former swimmer who competed in the 1980 Summer Olympics.
