= Laura Foralosso =

Italian swimmer

Personal information
- Born: October 21, 1965 (age 60)

Sport
- Sport: Swimming
- Strokes: Backstroke

Laura Foralosso (born 21 October 1965) is an Italian former backstroke swimmer who competed in the 1980 Summer Olympics.
