= Anna Rita Sparaciari =

Italian fencer (born 1959)

Personal information
- Born: 3 March 1959 (age 67) Ancona, Italy

Sport
- Sport: Fencing
- Team: Italy
Medal record
Mediterranean Games
Silver medal – second place	1979 Split	Individual foil

Anna Rita Sparaciari (born 3 March 1959) is an Italian fencer. She competed in the women's individual and team foil events at the 1980 Summer Olympics. She won a silver medal in the individual foil event at the 1979 Mediterranean Games.
