= Annika Uvehall =

Swedish swimmer

Personal information
- Born: March 5, 1965 (age 61)

Sport
- Sport: Swimming
- Strokes: Backstroke

Annika Uvehall (born 5 March 1965) is a former Swedish backstroke swimmer. She competed in the 1980 Summer Olympics where she swam the 100 m backstroke and the 4×100 m medley relay.

== Clubs ==
- Sandviks IK
