= Brigitte Bosmans =

Belgian swimmer

Personal information
- Born: 29 May 1965 (age 61)

Sport
- Sport: Swimming

Brigitte Bosmans (born 29 May 1965) is a Belgian breaststroke swimmer. She competed in three events at the 1980 Summer Olympics.
