= Pascale Verbauwen =

Belgian swimmer (born 1963)

Personal information
- Born: 10 April 1963 (age 63) Ghent, Belgium

Sport
- Sport: Swimming

Pascale Verbauwen (born 10 April 1963) is a Belgian freestyle swimmer. She competed in four events at the 1980 Summer Olympics.
