= Yolande van der Straten =

Belgian swimmer

Personal information
- Full name: Yolande van der Straten Waillet
- Born: 8 May 1965 (age 61) Liège, Belgium

Sport
- Sport: Swimming

Yolande van der Straten (born 8 May 1965) is a Belgian-Italian backstroke swimmer. She competed at the 1980 Summer Olympics and the 1984 Summer Olympics.
