= Swimming at the 1980 Summer Olympics – Women's 200 metre freestyle =

Women's 200 metre freestyle at the Games of the XXII Olympiad
- Venue: Swimming Pool at the Olimpiysky Sports Complex
- Date: 24 July 1980 (heats & final)
- Competitors: 22 from 14 nations
- Winning time: 1:58.33 OR

Medalists
1st place, gold medalist(s)		Barbara Krause	East Germany
2nd place, silver medalist(s)		Ines Diers	East Germany
3rd place, bronze medalist(s)		Carmela Schmidt	East Germany

The women's 200 metre freestyle event at the 1980 Summer Olympics was held on 24 July at the Swimming Pool at the Olimpiysky Sports Complex.

== Records ==
Prior to this competition, the existing world and Olympic records were as follows.

World record	Cynthia Woodhead (USA)	1:58.23	Tokyo, Japan	3 September 1979
Olympic record	Kornelia Ender (GDR)	1:59.26	Montreal, Canada	22 July 1976

The following records were established during the competition:

Date	Event	Name	Nationality	Time	Record
24 July	Final	Barbara Krause	East Germany	1:58.33	OR

== Results ==
=== Heats ===
Rank	Heat	Name	Nationality	Time	Notes
1	2	Ines Diers	East Germany	2:00.27	Q
2	4	Barbara Krause	East Germany	2:01.18	Q
3	3	Carmela Schmidt	East Germany	2:02.32	Q
4	4	Olga Klevakina	Soviet Union	2:02.36	Q
5	1	Reggie de Jong	Netherlands	2:02.66	Q
6	1	Nataliya Strunnikova	Soviet Union	2:03.36	Q
7	1	Irina Aksyonova	Soviet Union	2:03.63	Q
8	3	June Croft	Great Britain	2:03.95	Q
9	2	Annelies Maas	Netherlands	2:04.07	
10	3	Rosemary Brown	Australia	2:04.59	
11	4	Guylaine Berger	France	2:04.60	
12	4	Pascale Verbauwen	Belgium	2:05.34	
13	3	Sonya Dangalakova	Bulgaria	2:05.67	
14	1	Natalia Más	Spain	2:05.73	
15	4	Tina Gustafsson	Sweden	2:05.84	
16	2	Karen Van der Graaf	Australia	2:06.06	
17	1	Sofia Dara	Greece	2:07.56	
18	3	Jacquelene Willmott	Great Britain	2:08.04	
19	2	Dobrinka Mincheva	Bulgaria	2:09.09	
20	3	Irinel Pănulescu	Romania	2:09.94	
21	4	Celeste García	Peru	2:13.05	
22	3	Soad Fezzani	Libya	2:30.14	
	1	Isabel Reuss	Mexico	DNS	
	2	Agneta Eriksson	Sweden	DNS	
	2	María París	Costa Rica	DNS	
	4	Michelle Ford	Australia	DNS	

=== Final ===
Rank	Name	Nationality	Time	Notes
1st place, gold medalist(s)	Barbara Krause	East Germany	1:58.33	OR
2nd place, silver medalist(s)	Ines Diers	East Germany	1:59.64	
3rd place, bronze medalist(s)	Carmela Schmidt	East Germany	2:01.44	
4	Olga Klevakina	Soviet Union	2:02.29	
5	Reggie de Jong	Netherlands	2:02.76	
6	June Croft	Great Britain	2:03.15	
7	Natalya Strunnikova	Soviet Union	2:03.74	
8	Irina Aksyonova	Soviet Union	2:04.00	
