= Swimming at the 1980 Summer Olympics – Women's 4 × 100 metre freestyle relay =

Women's 4 × 100 metre freestyle relay at the Games of the XXII Olympiad
- Venue: Swimming Pool at the Olimpiysky Sports Complex
- Dates: 27 July 1980 (heats & finals)
- Competitors: 39 from 9 nations
- Teams: 9
- Winning time: 3:42.71 WR

Medalists
1st place, gold medalist(s)		Barbara Krause, Caren Metschuck, Ines Diers, Sarina Hülsenbeck, Carmela Schmidt*	East Germany
2nd place, silver medalist(s)		Carina Ljungdahl, Tina Gustafsson, Agneta Mårtensson, Agneta Eriksson, Birgitta Jönsson*, Helena Peterson*	Sweden
3rd place, bronze medalist(s)		Conny van Bentum, Wilma van Velsen, Reggie de Jong, Annelies Maas; *Indicates the swimmer only competed in the preliminary heats.	Sweden

The women's 4 × 100 metre freestyle relay event at the 1980 Summer Olympics was held on 27 July at the Swimming Pool at the Olimpiysky Sports Complex.

== Records ==
Prior to this competition, the existing world and Olympic records were as follows.

World record	United States (USA); Tracy Caulkins (56.57); Stephanie Elkins (55.92); Jill Sterkel (55.70); Cynthia Woodhead (55.24)	3:43.43	West Berlin, West Germany	26 August 1978
Olympic record	United States; Kim Peyton (56.95); Wendy Boglioli (55.81); Jill Sterkel (55.78); Shirley Babashoff (56.28)	3:44.82	Montreal, Canada	25 July 1976

The following records were established during the competition:

Date	Event	Name	Nationality	Time	Record
27 July	Final	Barbara Krause (54.90); Caren Metschuck (55.61); Ines Diers (55.90); Sarina Hülsenbeck (56.30)	East Germany	3:42.71	WR

== Results ==
=== Heats ===
Rank	Heat	Nation	Swimmers	Time	Notes
1	2	East Germany	Barbara Krause (56.09); Sarina Hülsenbeck (55.99); Caren Metschuck (55.81); Carmela Schmidt (57.30)	3:45.19	Q
2	1	Netherlands	Conny van Bentum (57.99); Wilma van Velsen (57.40); Reggie de Jong (58.34); Annelies Maas (57.57)	3:51.30	Q
3	1	Sweden	Carina Ljungdahl (57.85); Birgitta Jönsson (58.44); Helena Peterson (58.58); Tina Gustafsson (57.35)	3:52.22	Q
4	1	Great Britain	June Croft (57.30); Kaye Lovatt (58.47); Jacquelene Willmott (58.99); Sharron Davies (58.32)	3:53.08	Q
5	2	Australia	Lisa Curry (59.68); Karen Van de Graaf (58.73); Rosemary Brown (58.92); Michelle Pearson (58.91)	3:56.24	Q
6	1	Mexico	Isabel Reuss (58.86); Dagmar Erdman (1:00.31); Teresa Rivera (58.37); Hellen Plaschinski (59.33)	3:56.87	Q
7	2	Spain	Natalia Mas (58.86); Margarita Armengol (59.89); Laura Flaque (59.74); Gloria Casado (59.84)	3:58.33	Q
8	1	Bulgaria	Stoianka Dyngalakova (59.38); Rumyana Dobreva (59.75); Ani Kostova (1:01.01); Dobrinka Mincheva (59.51)	3:59.65	Q
	2	Soviet Union	Irina Gerasimova; Natalya Strunnikova; Larisa Tsaryova; Olga Klevakina	DSQ	

- The Soviet Union was disqualified in the heats for an improper changeover.

=== Final ===
Rank	Nation	Swimmers	Time	Notes
1st place, gold medalist(s)	East Germany	Barbara Krause (54.90); Caren Metschuck (55.61); Ines Diers (55.90); Sarina Hülsenbeck (56.30)	3:42.71	WR
2nd place, silver medalist(s)	Sweden	Carina Ljungdahl (57.61); Tina Gustafsson (56.82); Agneta Mårtensson (57.93); Agneta Eriksson (56.57)	3:48.93	
3rd place, bronze medalist(s)	Netherlands	Conny van Bentum (57.50); Wilma van Velsen (57.38); Reggie de Jong (57.17); Annelies Maas (57.46)	3:49.51	
4	Great Britain	Sharron Davies (58.74); Kaye Lovatt (58.44); Jacquelene Willmott (57.68); June Croft (56.85)	3:51.71	
5	Australia	Lisa Curry (59.13); Karen Van de Graaf (57.79); Rosemary Brown (59.38); Michelle Pearson (57.86)	3:54.16	
6	Mexico	Isabel Reuss (57.99); Dagmar Erdman (1:01.17); Teresa Rivera (58.60); Hellen Plaschinski (57.65)	3:55.41	
7	Bulgaria	Dobrinka Mincheva (58.90); Rumiana Dobreva (59.79); Ani Kostova (59.72); Stoianka Dyngalakova (57.93)	3:56.34	
8	Spain	Natalia Mas (58.88); Margarita Armengol (1:00.08); Laura Flaque (1:00.05); Gloria Casado (59.72)	3:58.73	
