= Swimming at the 1980 Summer Olympics – Women's 100 metre freestyle =

Women's 100 metre freestyle at the Games of the XXII Olympiad
- Venue: Swimming Pool at the Olimpiysky Sports Complex
- Date: 20 July (heats); 21 July (final)
- Competitors: 30 from 21 nations
- Winning time: 54.79 WR

Medalists
1st place, gold medalist(s)		Barbara Krause	East Germany
2nd place, silver medalist(s)		Caren Metschuck	East Germany
3rd place, bronze medalist(s)		Ines Diers	East Germany

The women's 100 metre freestyle event at the 1980 Summer Olympics was held on 20 and 21 July at the Swimming Pool at the Olimpiysky Sports Complex.

== Records ==
Prior to this competition, the existing world and Olympic records were as follows.

World record	Barbara Krause (GDR)	55.41	East Berlin, East Germany	5 July 1978
Olympic record	Kornelia Ender (GDR)	55.65	Montreal, Canada	19 July 1976

The following records were established during the competition:

Date	Event	Name	Nationality	Time	Record
20 July	Heat 3	Barbara Krause	East Germany	54.98	WR
21 July	Final	Barbara Krause	East Germany	54.79	WR

== Results ==
=== Heats ===
Rank	Heat	Name	Nationality	Time	Notes
1	3	Barbara Krause	East Germany	54.98	Q, WR
2	4	Caren Metschuck	East Germany	55.44	Q
3	2	Ines Diers	East Germany	56.83	Q
4	1	Natalya Strunnikova	Soviet Union	57.43	Q
5	4	Conny van Bentum	Netherlands	57.51	Q
6	1	Olga Klevakina	Soviet Union	57.62	Q
7	4	Agneta Eriksson	Sweden	57.67	Q
8	2	Guylaine Berger	France	57.80	Q
9	3	June Croft	Great Britain	57.88	
10	3	Carina Ljungdahl	Sweden	58.05	
11	2	Isabel Reuss	Mexico	58.36	
12	1	Jacquelene Willmott	Great Britain	58.78	
13	3	Michelle Pearson	Australia	58.90	
14	1	Carine Verbauwen	Belgium	59.08	
15	2	Larisa Tsaryova	Soviet Union	59.12	
16	2	Rosemary Brown	Australia	59.35	
17	4	Monica Vallarin	Italy	59.43	
18	4	Natalia Más	Spain	59.53	
19	3	Heidi Koch	Austria	59.73	
20	3	Helen Plaschinski	Mexico	59.75	
21	2	María Paris	Costa Rica	1:01.08	
22	1	Celeste García	Peru	1:02.44	
23	2	Lynne Tasker	Zimbabwe	1:03.36	
24	3	Olga Loizou	Cyprus	1:06.50	
25	4	Bako Ratsifa	Madagascar	1:07.21	
26	3	Garnet Charwat	Nicaragua	1:08.98	
27	1	Michele Pessoa	Angola	1:09.10	
28	2	Nadia Fezzani	Libya	1:09.28	
29	4	Chung Thị Thanh Lan	Vietnam	1:12.27	
	4	Monique Drost	Netherlands	DSQ	
	1	Karen Van de Graaf	Australia	DNS	

=== Final ===
Rank	Name	Nationality	Time	Notes
1st place, gold medalist(s)	Barbara Krause	East Germany	54.79	WR
2nd place, silver medalist(s)	Caren Metschuck	East Germany	55.16	
3rd place, bronze medalist(s)	Ines Diers	East Germany	55.65	
4	Olga Klevakina	Soviet Union	57.40	
5	Conny van Bentum	Netherlands	57.63	
6	Natalya Strunnikova	Soviet Union	57.83	
7	Guylaine Berger	France	57.88	
8	Agneta Eriksson	Sweden	57.90	
