= Swimming at the 1980 Summer Olympics – Women's 400 metre freestyle =

Women's 400 metre freestyle at the Games of the XXII Olympiad
- Venue: Swimming Pool at the Olimpiysky Sports Complex
- Date: 22 July
- Competitors: 19 from 12 nations
- Winning time: 4:08.76 OR

Medalists
1st place, gold medalist(s)		Ines Diers	East Germany
2nd place, silver medalist(s)		Petra Schneider	East Germany
3rd place, bronze medalist(s)		Carmela Schmidt	East Germany

The women's 400 metre freestyle event at the 1980 Summer Olympics was held on 22 July at the Swimming Pool at the Olimpiysky Sports Complex.

== Records ==
Prior to this competition, the existing world and Olympic records were as follows.

World record	Tracey Wickham (AUS)	4:06.28	West Berlin, West Germany	24 August 1978
Olympic record	Petra Thümer (GDR)	4:09.89	Montreal, Canada	20 July 1976

The following records were established during the competition:

Date	Event	Name	Nationality	Time	Record
22 July	Final	Ines Diers	East Germany	4:08.76	OR

== Results ==
=== Heats ===
Rank	Heat	Name	Nationality	Time	Notes
1	1	Carmela Schmidt	East Germany	4:13.01	Q
2	1	Annelies Maas	Netherlands	4:13.12	Q
3	3	Michelle Ford	Australia	4:13.90	Q
4	2	Ines Diers	East Germany	4:13.98	Q
5	2	Irina Aksyonova	Soviet Union	4:14.39	Q
6	3	Petra Schneider	East Germany	4:14.49	Q
7	2	Reggie de Jong	Netherlands	4:15.07	Q
8	2	Olga Klevakina	Soviet Union	4:18.13	Q
9	3	Oksana Komissarova	Soviet Union	4:18.61	
10	1	Pascale Verbauwen	Belgium	4:18.98	
11	1	Sharron Davies	Great Britain	4:19.99	
12	1	Sofia Dara	Greece	4:20.32	
13	1	Rosemary Brown	Australia	4:21.36	
14	3	Roberta Felotti	Italy	4:21.94	
15	3	Jacquelene Willmott	Great Britain	4:22.32	
16	2	Nikole Schrepfer	Switzerland	4:28.40	
17	2	Natalia Más	Spain	4:29.81	
18	3	María Pia Ayora	Peru	4:46.90	
19	2	Soad Fezzani	Libya	5:16.17	
	1	Klára Gulyás	Hungary	DNS	

=== Final ===
Rank	Name	Nationality	Time	Notes
1st place, gold medalist(s)	Ines Diers	East Germany	4:08.76	OR
2nd place, silver medalist(s)	Petra Schneider	East Germany	4:09.16	
3rd place, bronze medalist(s)	Carmela Schmidt	East Germany	4:10.86	
4	Michelle Ford	Australia	4:11.65	
5	Irina Aksyonova	Soviet Union	4:14.40	
6	Annelies Maas	Netherlands	4:15.79	
7	Reggie de Jong	Netherlands	4:15.95	
8	Olga Klevakina	Soviet Union	4:19.18	
