= Netherlands at the 1980 Summer Olympics =

- Flag of the Olympic Movement
- IOC code: NED (HOL used at these Games)
- NOC: Dutch Olympic Committee

in Moscow
- Competitors: 75 (57 men, 18 women) in 10 sports
- Medals Ranked 30th: Gold 0 Silver 1 Bronze 2 Total 3

Summer Olympics appearances (overview)
- 1900; 1904; 1908; 1912; 1920; 1924; 1928; 1932; 1936; 1948; 1952; 1956; 1960; 1964; 1968; 1972; 1976; 1980; 1984; 1988; 1992; 1996; 2000; 2004; 2008; 2012; 2016; 2020; 2024

Other related appearances
- 1906 Intercalated Games

The Netherlands competed at the 1980 Summer Olympics in Moscow, USSR. In partial support of the American-led boycott of the 1980 Summer Olympics in protest over the Soviet Union's invasion of Afghanistan, the Dutch athletes boycotted the Opening Ceremony, and the Olympic Flag was used in place of Netherlands' national flag at medal ceremonies. 75 competitors, 57 men and 18 women, took part in 56 events in 10 sports.

== Medalists ==
Medal	Name	Sport	Event	Date
Silver	Gerard Nijboer	Athletics	Men's marathon	1 August
Bronze	Henk Numan	Judo	Men's 95 kg	27 July
Bronze	Conny van Bentum, Reggie de Jong, Annelies Maas, Wilma van Velsen	Swimming	Women's 4 × 100 m freestyle relay	27 July

== Archery ==
The first appearance by Dutch archers in the Olympics resulted in top eight finishes for both competitors.

Athlete	Event	Round 1		Round 2		Total	
Athlete	Event	Score	Position	Score	Position	Score	Position
Marinus Reniers	Men's	1205	12	1213	9	2418	8
Catherina Floris	Women's	1186	7	1196	6	2382	6

== Athletics ==
Men's 100 metres

- Mario Westbroek

- Heat — 10.91 (→ did not advance)

Men's 200 metres

- Henk Brouwer

- Heat — 21.96 (→ did not advance)

Men's 10,000 metres

- Gerard Tebroke

- Heat — 29:05.0 (→ did not advance)

Men's Marathon

- Gerard Nijboer

- Final — 2:11:20 (→ Silver Medal)

- Cor Vriend

- Final — 2:26:41 (→ 41st place)

Men's 4x400 metres Relay

- Henk Brouwer, Mario Westbroek, Marcel Klarenbeek, and Harry Schulting

- Heat — 3:06.0 (→ did not advance)

Men's 400 m Hurdles

- Harry Schulting

- Heat — 50.01
- Semifinals — 50.61 (→ did not advance)

Women's 100 metres

- Els Vader

- Heat — 11.61
- Quarterfinals — did not finish (→ did not advance)

Women's Pentathlon

- Sylvia Barlag — 4333 points (→ 10th place)
  1. 100 metres — 14.20s
  2. Shot Put — 11.82m
  3. High Jump — 1.80m
  4. Long Jump — 6.05m
  5. 800 metres — 2:16.40

== Cycling ==
Seven cyclists represented the Netherlands in 1980.

Individual road race

- Adri van der Poel
- Jacques Hanegraaf
- Peter Winnen
- Jacques van Meer

Team time trial

- Guus Bierings
- Jacques Hanegraaf
- Theo Hogervorst
- Adri van der Poel

Sprint

- Lau Veldt

== Swimming ==
Men's 100 m Freestyle

- Cees Vervoorn

- Heats — 52,57
- Semi-Finals — 52,73 (→ did not advance)

Men's 200 m Freestyle

- Peter Drost

- Heats — 1.55,41 (→ did not advance)

- Cees Jan Winkel

- Heats — 1.56,48(→ did not advance)

Men's 100 m Butterfly

- Cees Vervoorn

- Heats — 55,76
- Semi-Finals — 55,02
- Final — 55,25 (→ 4th place)

Men's 200 m Butterfly

- Cees Vervoorn

- Heats — 2.02,21
- Final — 2.02,52 (→ 6th place)

Men's 100 m Breaststroke

- Albert Boonstra

- Heats — 1.06,47 (→ did not advance)

Men's 200 m Breaststroke

- Albert Boonstra

- Heats — 2.27,21 (→ did not advance)

Men's 100 m Backstroke

- Fred Eefting

- Heats — 58,59
- Semi-Finals — 57,91
- Final — 57,95 (→ 6th place)

Men's 200 m Backstroke

- Fred Eefting

- Heats — 2.04,78
- Final — 2.03,92 (→ 5th place)

Men's 4 × 200 m Freestyle Relay

- Cees Vervoorn, Peter Drost, Cees Jan Winkel, and Fred Eefting

- Heats — 7.42,85 (→ did not advance)

Men's 4 × 100 m Medley Relay

- Fred Eefting, Albert Boonstra, Cees Vervoorn, and Cees Jan Winkel

- Heats — 3.52,33
- Final — 3.51,81 (→ 7th place)

Women's 100 m Freestyle

- Conny van Bentum

- Heats — 57,51
- Final — 57,63 (→ 5th place)

- Monique Drost

- Heats — DSQ

Women's 200 m Freestyle

- Reggie de Jong

- Heats — 2.02,66
- Final — 2.02,76 (→ 5th place)

- Annelies Maas

- Heats — 2.04,07 (→ did not advance)

Women's 400 m Freestyle

- Reggie de Jong

- Heats — 4.15,07
- Final — 4.15,98 (→ 7th place)

- Annelies Maas

- Heats — 4.13,12
- Final — 4.15,79 (→ 6th place)

Women's 800 m Freestyle

- Reggie de Jong

- Heats — 8.54,49 (→ did not advance)

Women's 100 m Butterfly

- Wilma van Velsen

- Heats — 1.03,31 (→ did not advance)

Women's 200 m Butterfly

- Wilma van Velsen

- Heats — 2.21,81 (→ did not advance)

Women's 100 m Backstroke

- Monique Bosga

- Heats — 1.04,36
- Final — 1.04,47 (→ 7th place)

- Jolanda de Rover

- Heats — 1.04,79 (→ did not advance)

Women's 200 m Backstroke

- Monique Bosga

- Heats — 2.19,21 (→ did not advance)

- Jolanda de Rover

- Heats — 2.17,12 (→ did not advance)

Women's 4 × 100 m Freestyle Relay

- Conny van Bentum, Wilma van Velsen, Reggie de Jong, and Annelies Maas

- Heats — 3.51,30
- Final — 3.49,51 (→ Bronze Medal)

== Water polo ==
=== Men's team competition ===
- Preliminary Round (Group A)

- Defeated Greece (8-7)
- Lost to Hungary (3-5)
- Defeated Romania (5-3)

- Final Round (Group A)

- Lost to Spain (5-6)
- Drew with Cuba (7-7)
- Lost to Yugoslavia (4-5)
- Lost to Soviet Union (3-7)
- Lost to Hungary (7-8) → 6th place

- Team Roster

- Stan van Belkum
- Wouly de Bie
- Ton Buunk
- Jan Jaap Korevaar
- Nico Landeweerd
- Aad van Mil
- Ruud Misdorp
- Dick Nieuwenhuizen
- Eric Noordegraaf
- Jan Evert Veer
- Hans van Zeeland
