= Swimming at the 1979 Pan American Games – Women's 4 × 100 metre freestyle relay =

Women's 4 × 100 metre freestyle relay at the 1979 Pan American Games
- Venue: Piscina Olimpica Del Escambron
- Dates: July 7 (preliminaries and finals)
- Competitors: from - nations

Medalists
Gold medal	Stephanie Elkins, Tracy Caulkins, Jill Sterkel and Cynthia Woodhead	United States
Silver medal	Gail Amundrud, Carol Klimpel, Anne Jardin and Wendy Quirk	Canada
Bronze medal	Teresa Rivera, Isabel Reuss, Yvonne Guerrero and Helen Plachinski	Mexico

The women's 4 × 100 metre freestyle relay competition of the swimming events at the 1979 Pan American Games took place on 7 July at the Piscina Olimpica Del Escambron. The last Pan American Games champion was the United States.

This race consisted of eight lengths of the pool. Each of the four swimmers completed two lengths of the pool. The first swimmer had to touch the wall before the second could leave the starting block.

== Results ==
All times are in minutes and seconds.

KEY:	q	Fastest non-qualifiers	Q	Qualified	GR	Games record	NR	National record	PB	Personal best	SB	Seasonal best

=== Final ===
The final was held on July 7.

Rank	Name	Nationality	Time	Notes
1st place, gold medalist(s)	Stephanie Elkins (57.90); Tracy Caulkins (56.21); Jill Sterkel (56.24); Cynthia Woodhead (55.47)	United States	3:45.82	NR, GR
2nd place, silver medalist(s)	Gail Amundrud (57.89); Carol Klimpel (57.31); Anne Jardin (57.21); Wendy Quirk (57.77)	Canada	3:50.18	
3rd place, bronze medalist(s)	Teresa Rivera (1:00.68); Isabel Reuss (1:00.91); Yvonne Guerrero (1:00.66); Helen Plachinski (59.80)	Mexico	4:02.05	NR
4	Sonia Acosta (1:00.67) NR; Vilma Aguilera (59.26); Genny Hernandez (1:03.36); Wanda Acosta (1:04.26)	Puerto Rico	4:07.55	NR
5	Maria Fátima (1:02.71); Maria Matta (1:03.15); Adriana Pereira (1:00.90); Maria Guimarães (1:02.21)	Brazil	4:08.97	
6	Alicia Boscatto (1:05.41); Andrea Neumeyer (1:02.59); Virginia Sanchero (1:01.33); Rosanna Juncos (1:01.66)	Argentina	4:10.99	
7	- - - -	-	-	
8	- - - -	-	-	
