= Fanny Fischer =

German sprint canoer

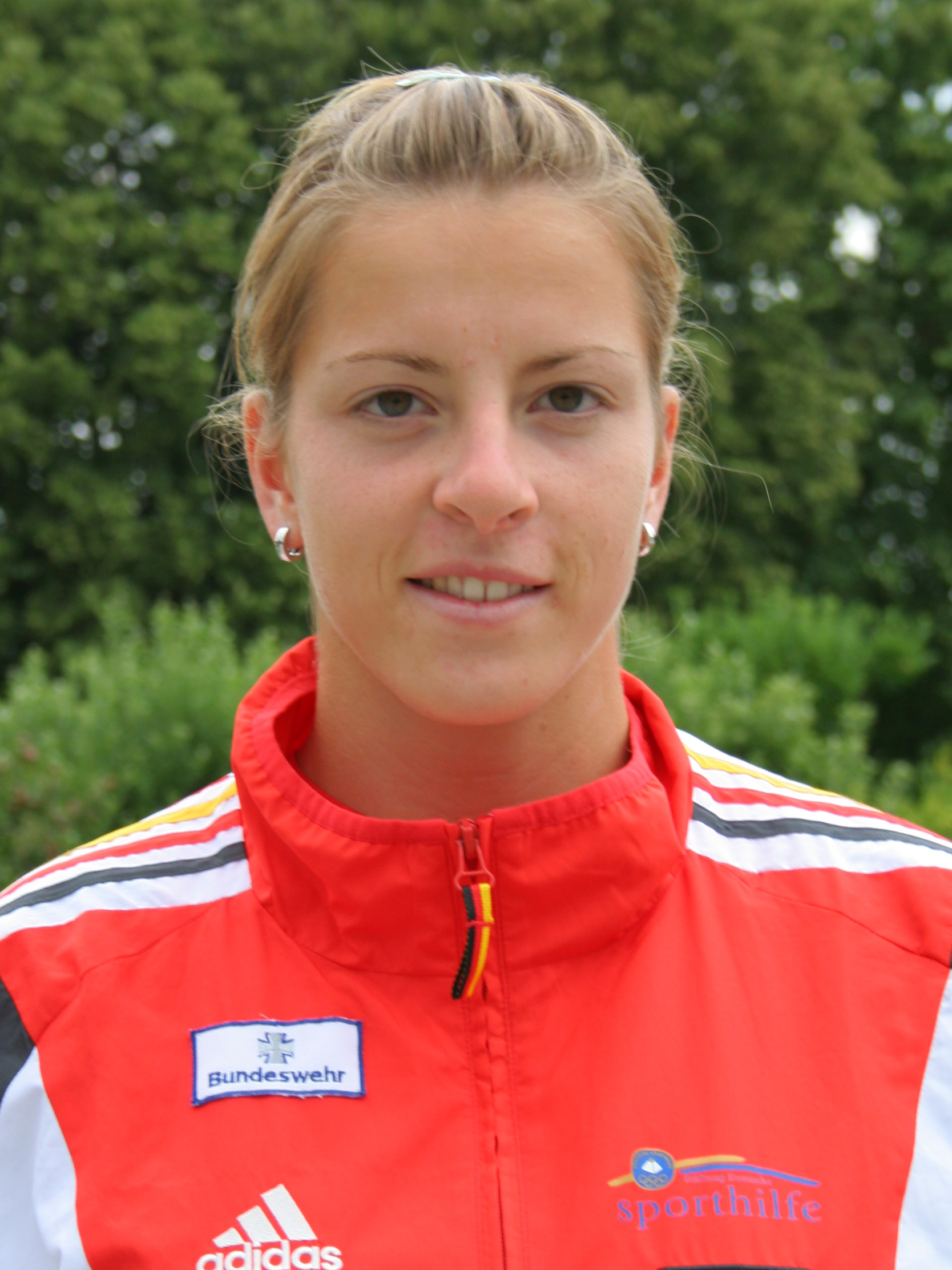
- Fanny Fischer in 2007.

Medal record

Women's canoe sprint

Olympic Games
Gold medal – first place	2008 Beijing	K-4 500 m

World Championships
Gold medal – first place	2007 Duisburg	K-2 200 m
Gold medal – first place	2007 Duisburg	K-2 500 m
Gold medal – first place	2009 Dartmouth	K-1 4 x 200 m
Silver medal – second place	2006 Szeged	K-2 200 m
Silver medal – second place	2009 Dartmouth	K-2 200 m
Silver medal – second place	2009 Dartmouth	K-2 500 m
Silver medal – second place	2010 Poznań	K-4 500 m
Bronze medal – third place	2005 Zagreb	K-2 500 m
Bronze medal – third place	2006 Szeged	K-2 500 m

Fanny Fischer (born 7 September 1986 in Potsdam) is a German canoe sprinter who has been competing since 1996 and on the senior circuit since 2006. She won a gold in the women's K-4 500 m event at the 2008 Summer Olympics in Beijing and finished fourth in the K-2 500 m event at those same games.

At the ICF Canoe Sprint World Championships, Fischer has won nine medals with three golds (K-1 4 × 200 m: 2009, K-2 200 m: 2007, K-2 500 m: 2007), four silvers (K-2 200 m: 2006, 2009; K-2 500 m: 2009), K-4 500 m: 2010, and two bronzes (K-2 500 m: 2005, 2006).

Fischer served as the main pundit for publicly owned television channel Das Erste during their coverage of the canoeing events at the 2012 Summer Olympics.

== Personal life ==
Fischer's mother, Sarina Hülsenbeck-Fischer, won a gold medal in women's swimming at the 1980 Summer Olympics in Moscow, earning it in the 4 × 100 m freestyle relay (anchor leg). Hülsenbeck competed in the qualifying round of the women's 4 × 100 m medley relay, but not in the final. Her father, Frank, won nine ICF Canoe Sprint World Championships medals in the early 1980s. Her aunt, Birgit Fischer, won twelve medals in canoeing at the Summer Olympics between 1980 and 2004. When not competing, she serves in the Bundeswehr as a soldier. Fischer's brother, Falco, is also a canoer.
