= Nadia Fezzani (swimmer) =

Libyan swimmer

Personal information
- Native name: نادية فزاني
- Full name: Nadia Fezzani

Sport
- Sport: Swimming

Nadia Fezzani (Arabic: نادية فزاني) is a Libyan swimmer. Ezzani would compete at the 1980 Summer Olympics, representing Libya in women's swimming. She would be one of the first Libyan swimmers to compete at an Olympic Games and would be the first woman to represent the nation at the Olympic Games.

Ezzani would first compete in the heats of the women's 100 metre freestyle event. She would place last in her heat and would not advance to the finals. She then competed in the women's 100 metre butterfly and again would place last in her heat and would not advance to the finals.

== Biography ==
Nadia Ezzani is a Libyan swimmer. Ezzani would compete at the 1980 Summer Olympics in Moscow in what was then the Soviet Union, representing Libya in women's swimming. She would be one of the first Libyan swimmers to compete in the sport at an Olympic Games and would be the first woman to represent the nation at any edition of the Olympic Games.

Ezzani would first compete in the heats of the women's 100 metre freestyle event at the Swimming Pool at the Olimpiysky Sports Complex on 20 July. She would compete in the second heat against seven other swimmers. There, she would place last in her heat with a time of 1:09.28. She would not advance to the finals of the event.

Her next event would be the heats of the women's 100 metre butterfly on 23 July. She would compete in the third heat against five other swimmers. There, she would again place last in her heat with a time of 1:12.94. She would not advance to the finals of the event.
