= Frank Fischer =

East German canoeist

Medal record

Men's canoe sprint

World Championships
Gold medal – first place	1983 Tampere	K-2 500 m
Gold medal – first place	1983 Tampere	K-2 1000 m
Gold medal – first place	1985 Mechelen	K-4 500 m
Gold medal – first place	1986 Montreal	K-4 500 m
Silver medal – second place	1981 Nottingham	K-2 1000 m
Silver medal – second place	1982 Belgrade	K-4 500 m
Silver medal – second place	1986 Montreal	K-2 1000 m
Bronze medal – third place	1981 Nottingham	K-2 500 m
Bronze medal – third place	1985 Mechelen	K-4 1000 m

Frank Fischer is an East German sprint canoer who competed from 1981 to 1986. He won nine medals at the ICF Canoe Sprint World Championships with four golds (K-2 500 m: 1983, K-2 1000 m: 1983, K-4 500 m: 1985, 1986), three silvers (K-2 1000 m: 1981, 1986; K-4 500 m: 1982), and two bronzes (K-2 500 m: 1981, K-4 1000 m: 1985).

== Personal life ==
Fischer's wife, Sarina, won a gold medal in women's swimming at the 1980 Summer Olympics in Moscow in the 4 x 100 m freestyle relay (anchor leg) and competed in the qualifying round of the 4 x 100 m medley relay. His daughter, Fanny, won the gold medal in the K-4 500 m event at the 2008 Summer Olympics in Beijing along with nine ICF Canoe Sprint World Championships medals of her own. His sister, Birgit Fischer, won twelve medals in canoeing at the Summer Olympics between 1980 and 2004. Fischer's son, Falco, is also a canoer.
