= Kostov =

Kostov (Bulgarian, Macedonian or Russian: Костов) is a Bulgarian or Macedonian masculine surname, its feminine counterpart is Kostova. It may refer to

- Aleksandar Kostov (1938–2019), Bulgarian football player
- Ani Kostova (born 1960), Bulgarian swimmer
- Boyanka Kostova (born 1993), Bulgarian-Azerbaijani weightlifter
- Dimo Kostov (born 1947), Bulgarian wrestler
- Elitsa Kostova (born 1990), Bulgarian tennis player
- Elizabeth Kostova (born 1964), American author
- Hari Kostov (born 1959), Macedonian politician
- Ivan Kostov Nikolov (1913–2004), Bulgarian geologist and mineralogist
- Ivan Yordanov Kostov (born 1949), Bulgarian politician
- Julian Kostov (born 1989), Bulgarian actor, filmmaker, swimmer, and pentathlete
- Kristian Kostov (born 2000), Bulgarian-Russian singer
- Liliana Kostova (born 1988), Bulgarian football striker
- Stanislav Kostov (born 1991), Bulgarian football player
- Traicho Kostov (1897–1949), Bulgarian politician
- Vlatko Kostov (born 1965), Macedonian football player and manager
