= Agneta Mårtensson =

Swedish swimmer

Personal information
- Full name: Ulla Agneta Linnéa Mårtensson
- Born: 31 July 1961 (age 64) Längbro, Örebro, Sweden
Medal record
Women's swimming
Representing Sweden
Olympic Games
Silver medal – second place	1980 Moscow	4x100 m freestyle

Ulla Agneta Linnéa Mårtensson (born 31 July 1961) is a Swedish former freestyle swimmer. She won a silver medal in 4 × 100 m freestyle relay at the 1980 Summer Olympics in Moscow along with Carina Ljungdahl, Tina Gustafsson and Agneta Eriksson. She also competed in the 1984 Summer Olympics.

Mårtensson was previously married to fellow swimmer and Olympic gold medal winner Bengt Baron.

== Personal bests ==
=== Long course (50 m) ===
Event	Time	Date	Meet	Location	Ref
200 m butterfly	2:15.22	21 Jul 1980	Olympic Games	Moscow, Soviet Union	

Legend: WR – World record; ER – European record; NR – Swedish record;
Records not set in finals: h – heat; sf – semifinal; r – relay 1st leg; rh – relay heat 1st leg; b – B final; † – en route to final mark; so – swim-off; tt – time trial

== Clubs ==
- Karlslunds IF
- SK Korrugal
