= Chung Thị Thanh Lan =

Vietnamese swimmer (born 1962)

Personal information
- Born: 17 January 1962 (age 64)

Sport
- Sport: Swimming

Chung Thị Thanh Lan (born 17 January 1962) is a Vietnamese swimmer. In 1977, she held the national record for the women's 800m freestyle with a time of 11 minutes 33.3 seconds. She competed in the women's 100 metre freestyle at the 1980 Summer Olympics. She was the first woman to represent Vietnam at the Olympics.
