= Olga Loizou =

Cypriot swimmer (born 1961)

Personal information
- Born: 3 December 1961 (age 64)

Sport
- Sport: Swimming

Olga Loizou (born 3 December 1961) is a Cypriot swimmer. She competed in the women's 100 metre freestyle at the 1980 Summer Olympics.
