= Michele Pessoa =

Angolan swimmer

Personal information
- Born: 4 January 1963 (age 63)

Sport
- Sport: Swimming

Michele Pessoa (born 4 January 1963) is an Angolan swimmer. She competed in two events at the 1980 Summer Olympics. She was the first woman to represent Angola at the Olympics.
