= Heidi Koch =

Austrian swimmer

Personal information
- Born: 23 February 1962 (age 64)

Sport
- Sport: Swimming

Heidi Koch (born 23 February 1962) is an Austrian swimmer. She competed in the women's 100 metre freestyle at the 1980 Summer Olympics.
