= Ines Diers =

East German swimmer

Personal information
- Nationality: East German
- Born: 2 November 1963 (age 62) Rochlitz, Sachsen, East Germany
- Height: 1.75 m (5 ft 9 in)
- Weight: 64 kg (141 lb)

Sport
- Sport: Swimming
- Strokes: Freestyle
- Club: SC Karl-Marx-Stadt
Medal record
Women's swimming
Representing East Germany
Olympic Games
Gold medal – first place	1980 Moscow	400 m freestyle
Gold medal – first place	1980 Moscow	4×100 m freestyle
Silver medal – second place	1980 Moscow	200 m freestyle
Silver medal – second place	1980 Moscow	800 m freestyle
Bronze medal – third place	1980 Moscow	100 m freestyle
European Championships (LC)
Gold medal – first place	1981 Split	400 m freestyle
Gold medal – first place	1981 Split	4x100 m freestyle
Silver medal – second place	1981 Split	800 m freestyle

Ines Diers (later Noack; born 2 November 1963, in Rochlitz) is a former freestyle swimmer from East Germany. At age sixteen she won a total number of five medals at the boycotted 1980 Summer Olympics in Moscow, USSR.
