= Spain at the 1980 Summer Olympics =

- IOC code: ESP
- NOC: Spanish Olympic Committee

in Moscow
- Competitors: 155 (146 men and 9 women) in 18 sports
- Flag bearer: Herminio Menéndez
- Medals Ranked 20th: Gold 1 Silver 3 Bronze 2 Total 6

Summer Olympics appearances (overview)
- 1900; 1904–1912; 1920; 1924; 1928; 1932; 1936; 1948; 1952; 1956; 1960; 1964; 1968; 1972; 1976; 1980; 1984; 1988; 1992; 1996; 2000; 2004; 2008; 2012; 2016; 2020; 2024

Spain competed at the 1980 Summer Olympics in Moscow, USSR. In partial support of the American-led Olympics boycott, Spain competed under its NOC flag instead of its national flag. 155 competitors, 146 men and 9 women, took part in 75 events in 18 sports.

== Medalists ==
Medal	Name	Sport	Event	Date
Gold	Alejandro Abascal; Miguel Noguer	Sailing	Flying Dutchman	July 29
Silver	Jordi Llopart	Athletics	Men's 50 kilometres walk	July 30
Silver	Spain men's national field hockey team: Juan Amat; Jaime Arbós; Juan Arbós; Javier Cabot; Ricardo Cabot; Miguel Chaves; Juan Coghen; Miguel de Paz; Francesc Fábregas; José Miquel García; Rafael Garralda; Santiago Malgosa; Paulino Monsalve; Juan Pellón; Carles Roca; Jaime Zumalacárregui	Field hockey	Men's tournament	July 31
Silver	Herminio Menéndez; Guillermo del Riego	Canoeing	Men's K-2 500 metres	August 1
Bronze	David López-Zubero	Swimming	Men's 100 metre butterfly	July 23
Bronze	Herminio Menéndez; Luis Gregorio Ramos	Canoeing	Men's K-2 1000 metres	August 2

== Archery ==
After not competing in archery in 1976, Spain returned to the sport in 1980. Two Spanish men competed.

Men's Individual Competition:

- Antonio Vazquez — 2240 points (→ 29th place)
- Francisco Peralta — 2181 points (→ 33rd place)

== Athletics ==
Men's 800 metres

- Colomán Trabado

- Heat — 1:47.9
- Semifinals — 1:48.1 (→ did not advance)

- Antonio Páez

- Heat — 1:49.5
- Semifinals — 1:47.8 (→ did not advance)

Men's 1,500 metres

- José Luis González

- Heat — 3:40.9
- Semifinals — 3:42.6 (→ did not advance)

- José Manuel Abascal

- Heat — 3:44.7 (→ did not advance)

Men's 10,000 metres

- Antonio Prieto

- Heat — 29:12.8 (→ did not advance)

Men's 4 × 400 metres Relay

- Isidoro Hornillos, Colomán Trabado, Benjamín González, and José Casabona

- Heat — 3:06.9 (→ did not advance)

Men's 110 m Hurdles

- Javier Moracho

- Heat — 13.72
- Semifinals — 13.80
- Final — 13.78 (→ 7th place)

- Carlos Sala

- Heat — 14.28
- Semifinals — 14.00 (→ did not advance)

Men's 400 m Hurdles

- Juan Lloveras

- Heat — 50.48
- Semifinals — 51.86 (→ did not advance)

- José Casabona

- Heat — 51.26 (→ did not advance)

Men's 3,000 m Steeplechase

- Domingo Ramón

- Heat — 8:31.9
- Semifinals — 8:22.0
- Final — 8:15.8 (→ 4th place)

- Francisco Sánchez

- Heat — 8:27.5
- Semifinals — 8:19.0
- Final — 8:18.0 (→ 5th place)

Men's High Jump

- Roberto Cabrejas

- Qualification — 2.21 m
- Final — 2.10 m (→ 16th place)

- Martí Perarnau

- Qualification — 2.15 m (→ did not advance)

Men's Long Jump

- Antonio Corgos

- Qualification — 7.96 m
- Final — 8.09 m (→ 7th place)

- Alberto Solanas

- Qualification — 7.73 m (→ did not advance)

Men's Triple Jump

- Ramon Cid

- Qualification — 16.20 m (→ did not advance)

Men's Marathon

- Eleuterio Anton

- Final — 2:18:16 (→ 22nd place)

Men's 20 km Walk

- Josep Marín

- Final — 1:26:45.6 (→ 5th place)

Men's 50 km Walk

- Jordi Llopart

- Final — 3:51:25 (→ Silver Medal)

- Josep Marín

- Final — 4:03:08 (→ 6th place)

== Diving ==
Men's Springboard

- Ricardo Camacho

- Preliminary round — 532.02 points (→ 8th place)
- Final — 749.340 points (→ 8th place)

== Fencing ==
Four fencers, all men, represented Spain in 1980.

Men's foil

- Miguel Roca
- Jesús Esperanza

Men's épée

- José Pérez

Men's sabre

- Valentín Paraíso

== Football ==
Men's Team Competition

- Preliminary round (Group C)

- Spain – East Germany 1-1 (0-0)
- Spain – Syria 0-0 (0-0)
- Spain – Algeria 1-1 (1-0) → did not advance

- Team roster

- Joaquín Alonso
- Marcos Alonso
- Francisco Buyo
- Miguel de Andrés
- Juan Antonio Felipe
- Agustín Gajate
- Angel González
- Francisco Guerri
- Jorge David López
- Víctor Muñoz
- Urbano Ortega
- Enrique Ramos
- Hipólito Rincón
- Agustín Rodríguez
- Santiago Urquiaga
- Manuel Zúñiga

== Handball ==
Men's Team Competition

- Preliminary round (Group A)

- Lost to East Germany (17-21)
- Defeated Denmark (20-19)
- Lost to Hungary (17-20)
- Drew with Cuba (24-24)
- Defeated Poland (24-22)

- Classification Match

- 5th/6th place: Defeated Yugoslavia (24-23) → 5th place

- Team Roster

- Agustín Milián
- Eugenio Serrano
- Francisco López
- Gregorio López
- Javier Cabanas
- Jesús María Albisu
- José Ignacio Novoa
- José María Pagoaga
- Juan Alfonso de la Puente
- Juan Francisco Muñoz
- Juan José Uría
- Juan Pedro de Miguel
- Rafael López
- Vicente Calabuig

== Hockey ==
Men's Team Competition

- Preliminary round

- Spain – Soviet Union 2-1
- Spain – Tanzania 12-0
- Spain – India 2-2
- Spain – Poland 6-0
- Spain – Cuba 11-0

- Final

- Spain – India 3-4 → Silver Medal

- Team Roster:

- Juan Amat
- Juan Arbós
- Jaime Arbós
- Javier Cabot
- Ricardo Cabot
- Miguel Chaves
- Juan Coghen
- Miguel de Paz
- Francisco Fábregas
- José Garcia
- Rafael Garralda
- Santiago Malgosa
- Paulino Monsalve
- Juan Pellón
- Carlos Roca
- Jaime Zumalacárregui

== Modern pentathlon ==
Three male pentathletes represented Spain in 1980.

Men's Individual Competition:

- Federico Galera — 5.001 pts, 25th place
- José Serrano — 4.887 pts, 29th place
- Manuel Montesinos — 4.811 pts, 32nd place

Men's Team Competition:

- Galera, Serrano, and Montesinos — 14.699pts, 9th place

== Sailing ==
Open

Athlete	Event	Race							Net points	Final rank
Athlete	Event	1	2	3	4	5	6	7	Net points	Final rank
José Luis Doreste	Finn	~~DSQ~~	DSQ	13	3	DNF	8	DNF	122.7	17
Gustavo Doreste; Alfredo Rigau	470	6	6	2	3	8	4	~~9~~	54.1	6
Alejandro Abascal; Miguel Noguer	Flying Dutchman	4	1	2	4	1	1	~~DNS~~	19.0	1st place, gold medalist(s)
Antonio Gorostegui; José Benavides	Star	7	8	7	6	7	4	~~12~~	72.7	7

== Shooting ==
Open

Athlete	Event	Final	
Athlete	Event	Points	Rank
José Luis Calvo	50 m rifle prone	591	32
Enrique Camarena	Skeet	189	26
Juan Casamajo	50 m rifle prone	592	25
Jaime González	25 m rapid fire pistol	586	22
Francisco Pérez	Skeet	195	7
Ricardo Sancho	Trap	190	10
Juan Segui	25 m rapid fire pistol	583	26
Eladio Vallduvi	Trap	195	5

== Swimming ==
Men's 100m Freestyle

- David López-Zubero

- Heats — 52,43
- Semi-Finals — 52,81 (→ did not advance)

Men's 200m Freestyle

- Ramón Lavín

- Heats — 1.56,99 (→ did not advance)

- David López-Zubero

- Heats — 1.53,22 (→ did not advance)

Men's 1.500m Freestyle

- Rafael Escalas

- Final — 15.21,88 (→ 6th place)

Men's 100m Butterfly

- David López-Zubero

- Final — 55,16 (→ Bronze Medal)

Women's 4 × 100 m Freestyle

- Natalia Más, Margarita Armengol, Laura Flaque, and Gloria Casado

- Final — 3.58,73 (→ 8th place)

== Notes ==
- Flags indicate the autonomous community (or country) of birth of each athlete.
