= Garnet Charwat =

Nicaraguan swimmer (born 1967)

Personal information
- Born: 7 June 1967 (age 59)

Sport
- Sport: Swimming

Garnet Charwat (born 7 June 1967) is a Nicaraguan swimmer. She competed in two events at the 1980 Summer Olympics.

== Career ==
She is now working in orthopedic rehabilitation in Bavaria, Germany.
