= José María Pagoaga =

Spanish handball player (1951–1995)

José María Pagoaga Larrañaga (11 November 1951, Mutriku – 29 June 1995, San Sebastián) was a Spanish Basque handball player who competed in the 1980 Summer Olympics for Spain. In 1980, he finished fifth with the Spanish team in the Olympic tournament. He played all six matches as goalkeeper.
