= Nikole Schrepfer =

Swiss swimmer

Personal information
- Born: 27 November 1964 (age 61)

Sport
- Sport: Swimming

Nikole Schrepfer (born 27 November 1964) is a Swiss swimmer. She competed in the women's 400 metre freestyle and women's 800 metre freestyle events at the 1980 Summer Olympics.
