= Dagmar Erdman =

Mexican swimmer

Personal information
- Born: 21 August 1965 (age 60)

Sport
- Sport: Swimming

Dagmar Erdman (born 21 August 1965) is a Mexican freestyle swimmer. She competed in two events at the 1980 Summer Olympics.
