= Dobrinka Mincheva =

Bulgarian swimmer

Personal information
- Born: 10 January 1962 (age 64)

Sport
- Sport: Swimming

Dobrinka Mincheva (Bulgarian: Добринка Минчева, born 10 January 1962) is a Bulgarian swimmer. She competed in three events at the 1980 Summer Olympics.
