= Carmela Schmidt =

East German swimmer

Personal information
- Nationality: East German
- Born: 16 May 1962 (age 64) Halle, East Germany
- Height: 1.74 m (5 ft 9 in)
- Weight: 66 kg (146 lb)

Sport
- Sport: Swimming
- Strokes: Freestyle
- Club: SV Halle
Medal record
Women's swimming
Representing East Germany
Olympic Games
Bronze medal – third place	1980 Moscow	200 m freestyle
Bronze medal – third place	1980 Moscow	400 m freestyle
World Championships (LC)
Gold medal – first place	1982 Guayaquil	400 m freestyle
Bronze medal – third place	1982 Guayaquil	800 m freestyle
European Championships (LC)
Gold medal – first place	1981 Split	200 m freestyle
Gold medal – first place	1981 Split	800 m freestyle
Silver medal – second place	1981 Split	400 m freestyle

Carmela Schmidt (born 16 May 1962 in Halle an der Saale) is a former freestyle swimmer from East Germany.

She won two bronze medals at the boycotted 1980 Summer Olympics in Moscow, USSR. Schmidt also won the world title in the 1982 World Aquatics Championships, in the 400 m freestyle.

== See also ==
- List of Olympic medalists in swimming (women)
- List of World Aquatics Championships medalists in swimming (women)
