= María Pia Ayora =

Peruvian swimmer

Personal information
- Born: 1 June 1962 (age 64)

Sport
- Sport: Swimming

María Pia Ayora (born 1 June 1962) is a Peruvian breaststroke, freestyle and medley swimmer. She competed in three events at the 1980 Summer Olympics.
