= Mario Westbroek =

Dutch sprinter (born 1961)

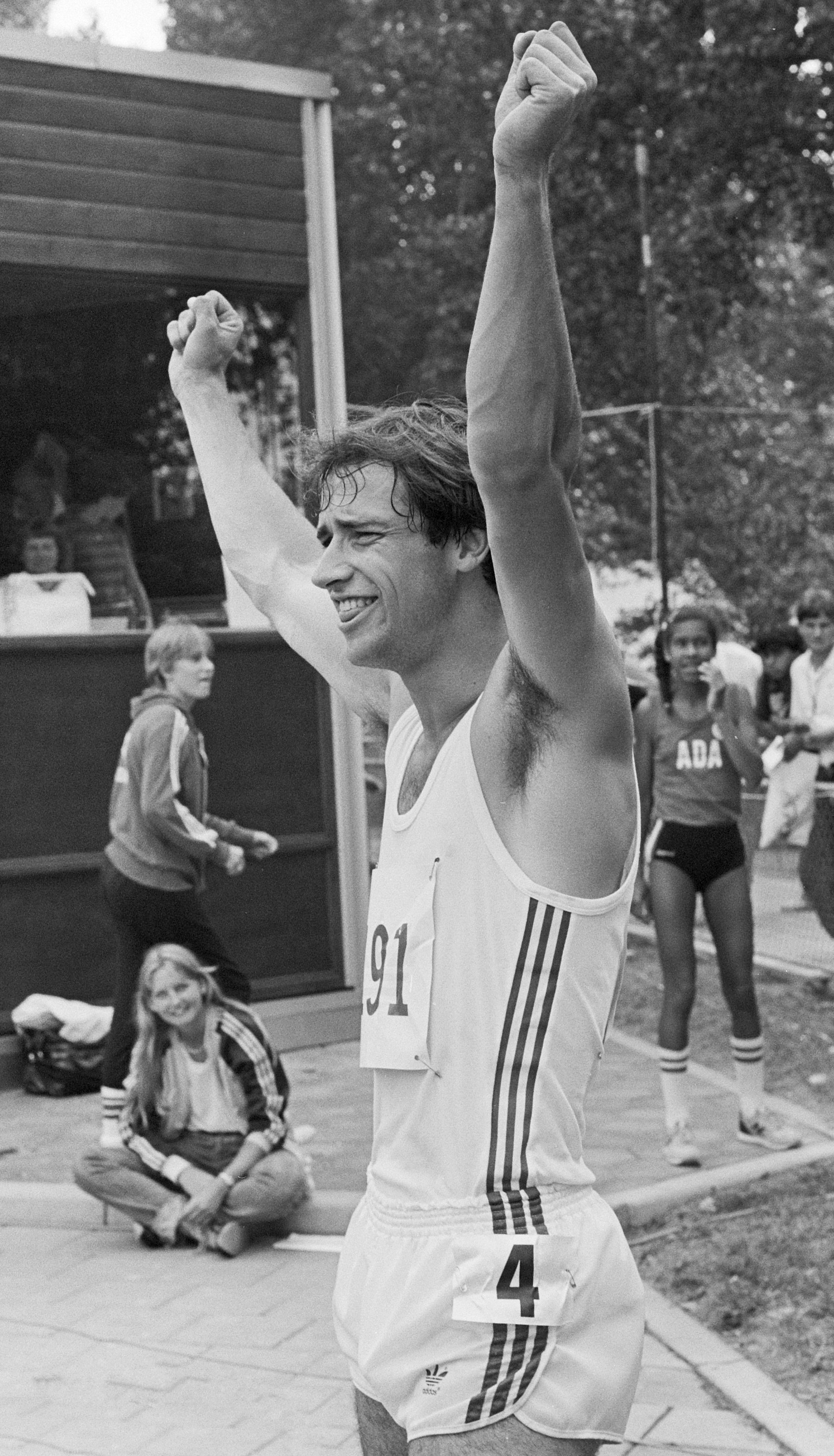
- Mario Westbroek after winning the national 200 m title in 1982

Personal information
- Born: 11 March 1961 (age 65) Rotterdam, the Netherlands
- Height: 1.84 m (6 ft 0 in)
- Weight: 73 kg (161 lb)

Sport
- Sport: Sprint
- Club: AV Haarlem

Marinus "Mario" Westbroek (born 11 March 1961) is a retired Dutch sprinter. He competed in the 100 m and 4 × 400 m relay at the 1980 Summer Olympics, but failed to reach the finals.
