= Cees Jan Winkel =

Dutch swimmer

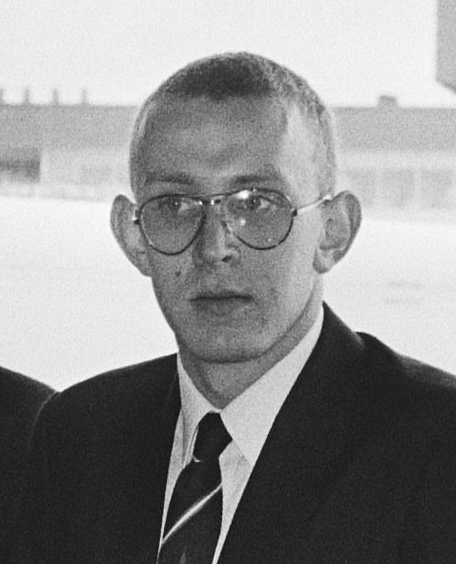
- Cees Jan Winkel in 1980

Personal information
- Born: 10 June 1962 (age 64) The Hague, Netherlands
- Height: 1.89 m (6 ft 2 in)
- Weight: 73 kg (161 lb)

Sport
- Sport: Swimming
- Club: HZ&PC, Den Haag

Cees Jan Winkel (born 10 June 1962) is a retired freestyle swimmer from the Netherlands. He competed at the 1980 Summer Olympics in three events and finished seventh in the 4 × 100 m medley relay.
