= Monique Bosga =

Dutch swimmer

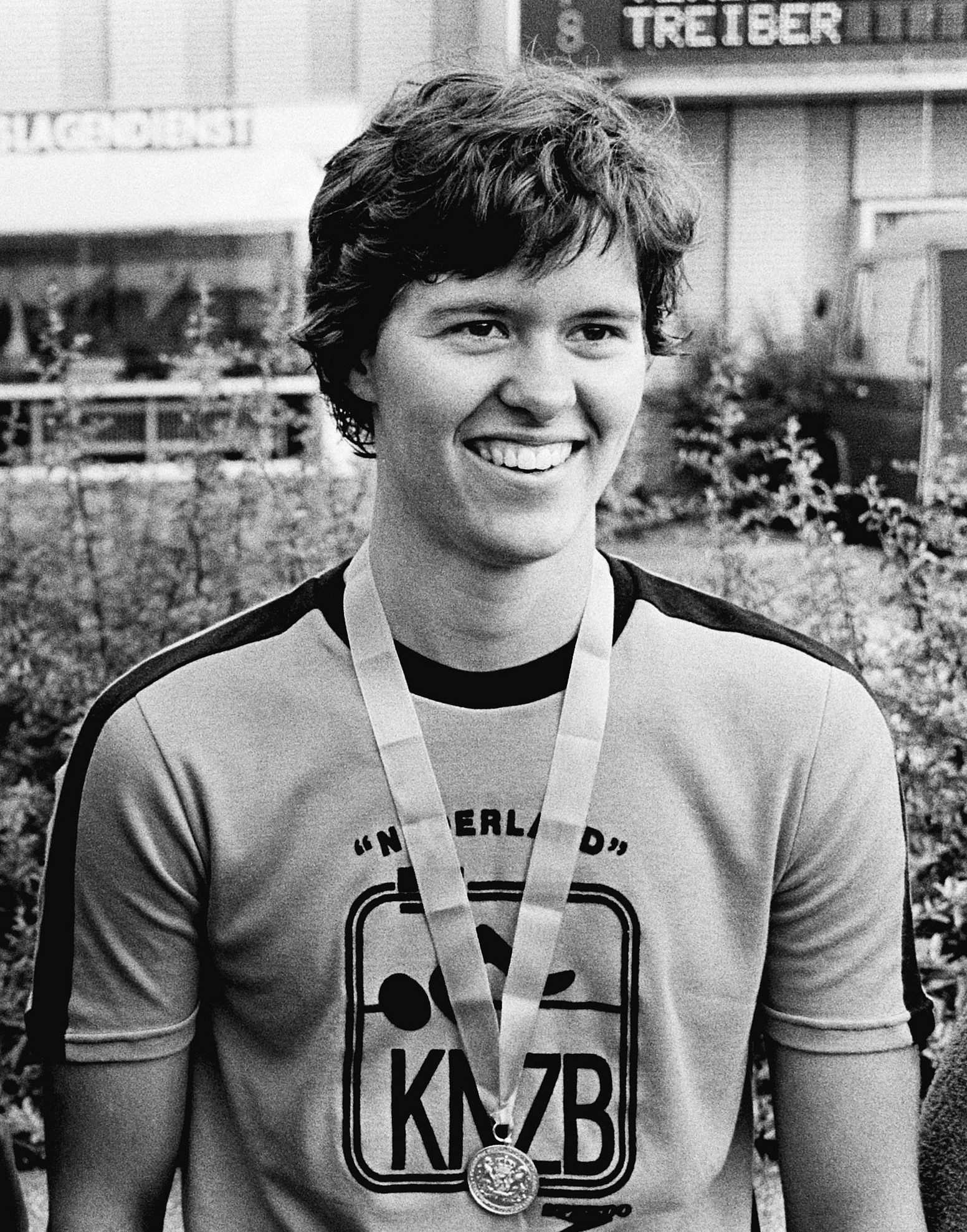
- Monique Bosga in 1979

Personal information
- Born: 21 September 1960 (age 65) Maracaibo, Venezuela
- Height: 1.83 m (6 ft 0 in)
- Weight: 68 kg (150 lb)

Sport
- Sport: Swimming
- Club: Zwemlust, Utrecht

Monique Bosga (born 21 September 1960) is a retired swimmer from the Netherlands. She competed at the 1980 Summer Olympics in the 100 m and 200 m backstroke and finished seventh in the former event.
