= Ani Kostova =

Bulgarian swimmer

Personal information
- Born: 13 April 1960 (age 66) Sofia, Bulgaria

Sport
- Sport: Swimming

Ani Kostova (Bulgarian: Ани Костова, born 13 April 1960) is a Bulgarian swimmer. She competed in the women's 4 × 100 metre freestyle relay at the 1980 Summer Olympics.
