= Sarina Hülsenbeck =

East German swimmer

Personal information
- Born: July 5, 1962 (age 63) Rostock, West Germany

Sport
- Sport: Swimming
Medal record
Representing East Germany
Olympic Games
Gold medal – first place	1980 Moscow	4x100 m freestyle

Sarina Hülsenbeck (later Fischer, born 5 July 1962) is an East German swimmer who competed in the late 1970s and early 1980s. She won a gold medal at the 1980 Summer Olympics in Moscow in the women's 4 × 100 m freestyle (anchor leg) and competed in the 4 × 100 m medley relay qualifying round, but not in the final.

== Personal life ==
Hülsenbeck married canoe sprinter Frank Fischer, a nine-time canoe sprint world championship medalist, in the early 1980s. Frank is the brother of 12-time Summer Olympic medalist Birgit, who competed from 1980 to 2004. Frank and Sarina produced two children, Fanny (born 1986) and Falco, both canoers.

Fanny won a gold medal in the women's K-4 500 m event at the 2008 Summer Olympics in Beijing and has nine world championship medals of her own with three gold, four silvers, and two bronzes.
