= Wilma van Velsen =

Dutch swimmer (born 1964)

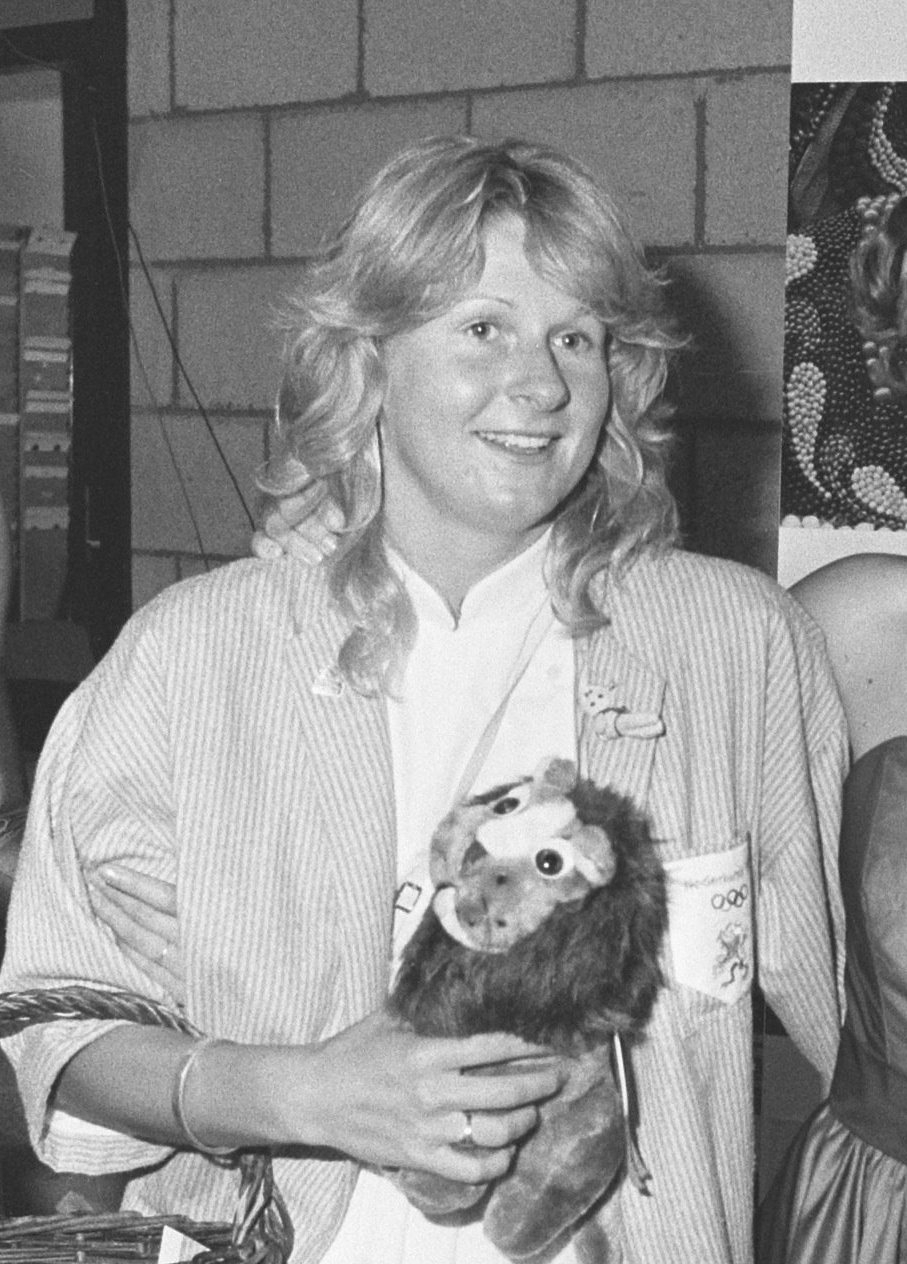
- Wilma van Velsen in 1984

Personal information
- Born: 22 April 1964 (age 62) Tiel, Gelderland, the Netherlands
- Height: 1.73 m (5 ft 8 in)
- Weight: 69 kg (152 lb)

Sport
- Sport: Swimming
- Club: TZC Vahalis, Tiel
Medal record
Women's swimming
Representing the Netherlands
Olympic Games
Silver medal – second place	1984 Los Angeles	4×100 m freestyle
Bronze medal – third place	1980 Moscow	4×100 m freestyle
World Championships (LC)
Bronze medal – third place	1982 Guayaquil	4×100 m freestyle
European Championships
Silver medal – second place	1983 Rome	4×100 m freestyle
Bronze medal – third place	1981 Split	4×100 m freestyle

Margot Wilhelmina ("Wilma") Teunisje van Velsen (born 22 April 1964 in Tiel, Gelderland) is a former butterfly and freestyle swimmer from The Netherlands, who twice competed for her country at the Summer Olympics, starting in 1980 in Moscow, Soviet Union. There she won the bronze medal in the 4×100 m freestyle relay, alongside Conny van Bentum, Annelies Maas and Reggie de Jong. Four years later in Los Angeles, United States she was a member of the silver winning team in the same event, although she just swam in the qualifying heats to bring The Netherlands to the final. There the team was made up by Conny van Bentum, Desi Reijers, Annemarie Verstappen, and Elles Voskes.

Between 1981 and 1983 van Velsen won three medals at European and world championships, also in the 4 × 100 m freestyle relay.
