= Caren Metschuck =

East German swimmer (born 1963)

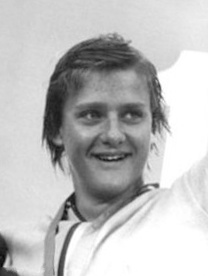
- Caren Metschuck in 1978.

Personal information
- Nationality: East German
- Born: 27 September 1963 (age 62) Greifswald, Bezirk Rostock, East Germany
- Height: 1.84 m (6 ft 0 in)
- Weight: 76 kg (168 lb)

Sport
- Sport: Swimming
- Strokes: Butterfly, freestyle
- Club: SC Empor Rostock
Medal record
Women's swimming
Representing East Germany
Olympic Games
Gold medal – first place	1980 Moscow	100 m butterfly
Gold medal – first place	1980 Moscow	4×100 m freestyle
Gold medal – first place	1980 Moscow	4×100 m medley
Silver medal – second place	1980 Moscow	100 m freestyle
World Championships
Gold medal – first place	1982 Guayaquil	4×100 m freestyle
Silver medal – second place	1978 Berlin	4×100 m freestyle
European Championship
Gold medal – first place	Split 1981	100 m freestyle
Gold medal – first place	Split 1981	4×100 m freestyle
Gold medal – first place	Split 1981	4×100 m medley

Caren Metschuck (later Mahn, born 27 September 1963) is a German former swimmer and a multiple Olympic gold medalist. At the 1980 Summer Olympics in Moscow, she won gold medals in the 100 m butterfly, 4×100 m freestyle relay team and 4×100 m medley relay, becoming the most successful female competitor of the Summer Olympic Games that year.

One year later, she won the European Championships in Split in the 100 m freestyle and triumphed again with the 4×100 m freestyle relay and the 4×100 m medley relay team. After winning a world title in the 4×100 m freestyle relay in 1982, she terminated her short career and became a school teacher. During her career she set three world records in relay events. In 1990 she was inducted into the International Swimming Hall of Fame. After German unification she worked as a swimming coach at her home club SC Empor Rostock.

== See also ==
- List of members of the International Swimming Hall of Fame
- World record progression 4 × 100 metres freestyle relay
- World record progression 4 × 100 metres medley relay
