= Helena Peterson =

Swedish swimmer

Personal information
- Born: April 8, 1962 (age 64)

Sport
- Sport: Swimming
Medal record
Representing Sweden
Olympic Games
Silver medal – second place	1980 Moscow	4x200m freestyle relay

Helena Peterson (born April 8, 1962) is a former Swedish Olympic freestyle swimmer. She competed in the 1980 Summer Olympics, where she swam the prelims for the silver medal winning Swedish 4×100 m freestyle relay team.

== Clubs ==
- SK Neptun
