= Sonya Dangalakova =

Bulgarian swimmer

Personal information
- Born: 1 October 1962 (age 63) Velingrad, Bulgaria

Sport
- Sport: Swimming

Sonya Dangalakova (Bulgarian: Соня Дангалакова, born 1 October 1962) is a Bulgarian swimmer. She competed in four events at the 1980 Summer Olympics.
