= Celeste García =

Peruvian swimmer

Personal information
- Born: 21 October 1964 (age 61)

Sport
- Sport: Swimming

Celeste García (born 21 October 1964) is a Peruvian freestyle and butterfly swimmer. She competed in four events at the 1980 Summer Olympics.
