= Birgitta Jönsson =

Swedish swimmer

Personal information
- Born: December 1, 1961 (age 64)

Sport
- Sport: Swimming
Medal record
Representing Sweden
Olympic Games
Silver medal – second place	1980 Moscow	4x200m freestyle relay

Birgitta Jönsson (born 1 December 1961) is a former Swedish Olympic swimmer. She was a part of the silver medal winning 4×200 m freestyle team in the 1980 Summer Olympics, swimming a leg in the prelims.

== Clubs ==
- Avesta SS
