= Albert Boonstra =

Dutch swimmer

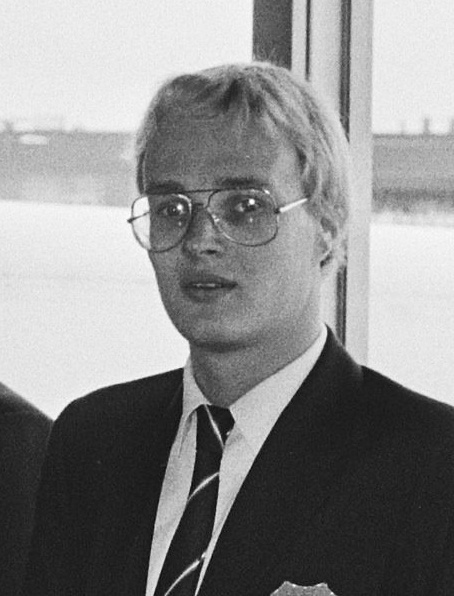
- Albert Boonstra in 1980

Personal information
- Born: 22 May 1957 (age 69) Nijmegen, Netherlands
- Height: 1.88 m (6 ft 2 in)
- Weight: 75 kg (165 lb)

Sport
- Sport: Swimming
- Club: NZC, Nijmegen

Albert Boonstra (born 22 May 1957) is a retired swimmer from the Netherlands. He competed at the 1980 Summer Olympics in the 100 m and 200 m breaststroke and 4 × 100 m medley relay and finished seventh in the relay.
