= Barbara Krause =

East German swimmer (born 1959)

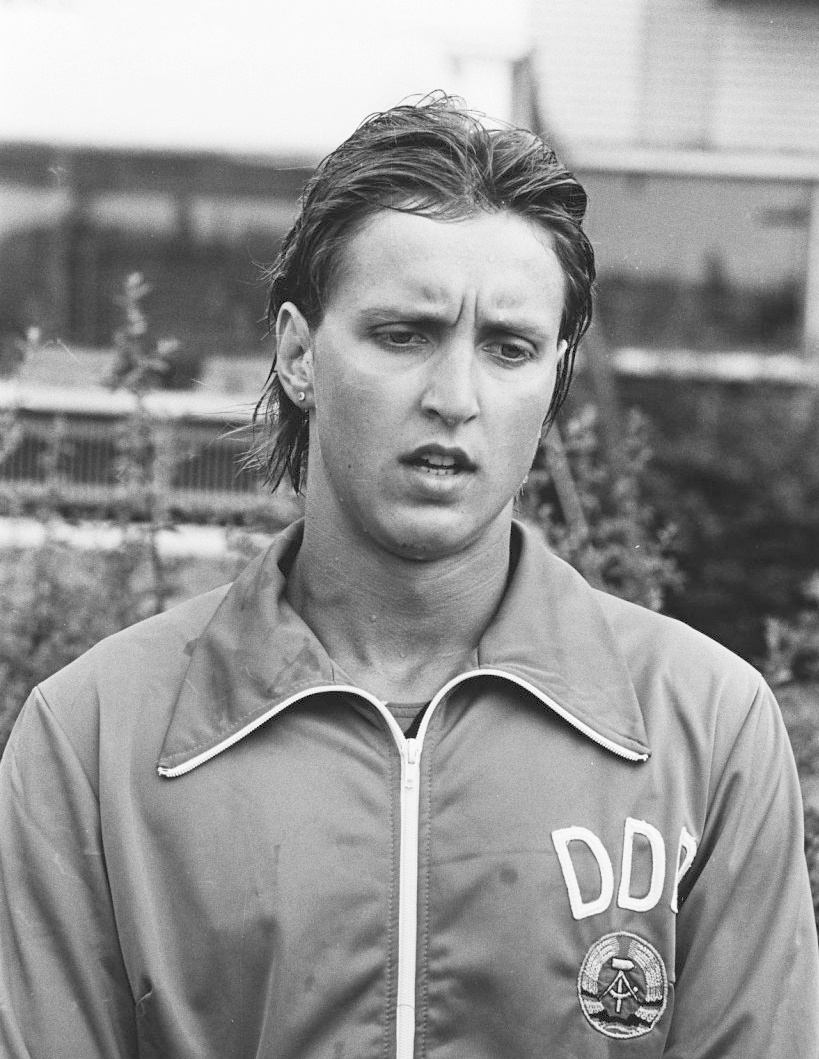
- Krause in 1979

Personal information
- Nationality: East German
- Born: 7 July 1959 (age 67) East Berlin, East Germany
- Height: 1.80 m (5 ft 11 in)
- Weight: 68 kg (150 lb)
- Spouse: Lutz Wanja

Sport
- Sport: Swimming
- Strokes: Freestyle
- Club: SC Dynamo Berlin
Medal record
Women's swimming
Representing East Germany
Olympic Games
Gold medal – first place	1980 Moscow	100 m freestyle
Gold medal – first place	1980 Moscow	200 m freestyle
Gold medal – first place	1980 Moscow	4×100 m freestyle
World Championships
Gold medal – first place	1975 Cali	4×100 m freestyle
Gold medal – first place	1978 Berlin	100 m freestyle
Silver medal – second place	1978 Berlin	200 m freestyle
Silver medal – second place	1978 Berlin	4×100 m freestyle
Silver medal – second place	1978 Berlin	4×100 m medley
European Championships
Gold medal – first place	1977 Jönköping	100 m freestyle
Gold medal – first place	1977 Jönköping	4×100 m freestyle
Gold medal – first place	1977 Jönköping	4×100 m medley
Silver medal – second place	1977 Jönköping	200 m freestyle
Bronze medal – third place	1977 Jönköping	400 m freestyle

Barbara Krause (later Wanja, born on 7 July 1959 in East Berlin) is a former freestyle swimmer from East Germany. She was a three-time Olympic gold medalist and eight-time world record holder. At the 1980 Summer Olympics in Moscow, Krause won gold medals in the 100 m and 200 m freestyle and in the 4×100 m freestyle relay.

Her husband, Lutz Wanja, is also a retired German Olympic swimmer.

== East German doping ==
Krause, like many of the East German athletes of that time, was doped by her coaches under instruction from the Stasi. At the time of the 1976 Summer Olympics in Montreal Krause was forced off the East German swimming team because "team doctors had miscalculated her dose of drugs and worried she might test positive at the Games".

Both of her children were born with deformed feet, which was later attributed to her use of steroids.

== See also ==
- List of members of the International Swimming Hall of Fame
