= Swimming at the 1980 Summer Olympics =

Swimming at the Games of the XXII Olympiad
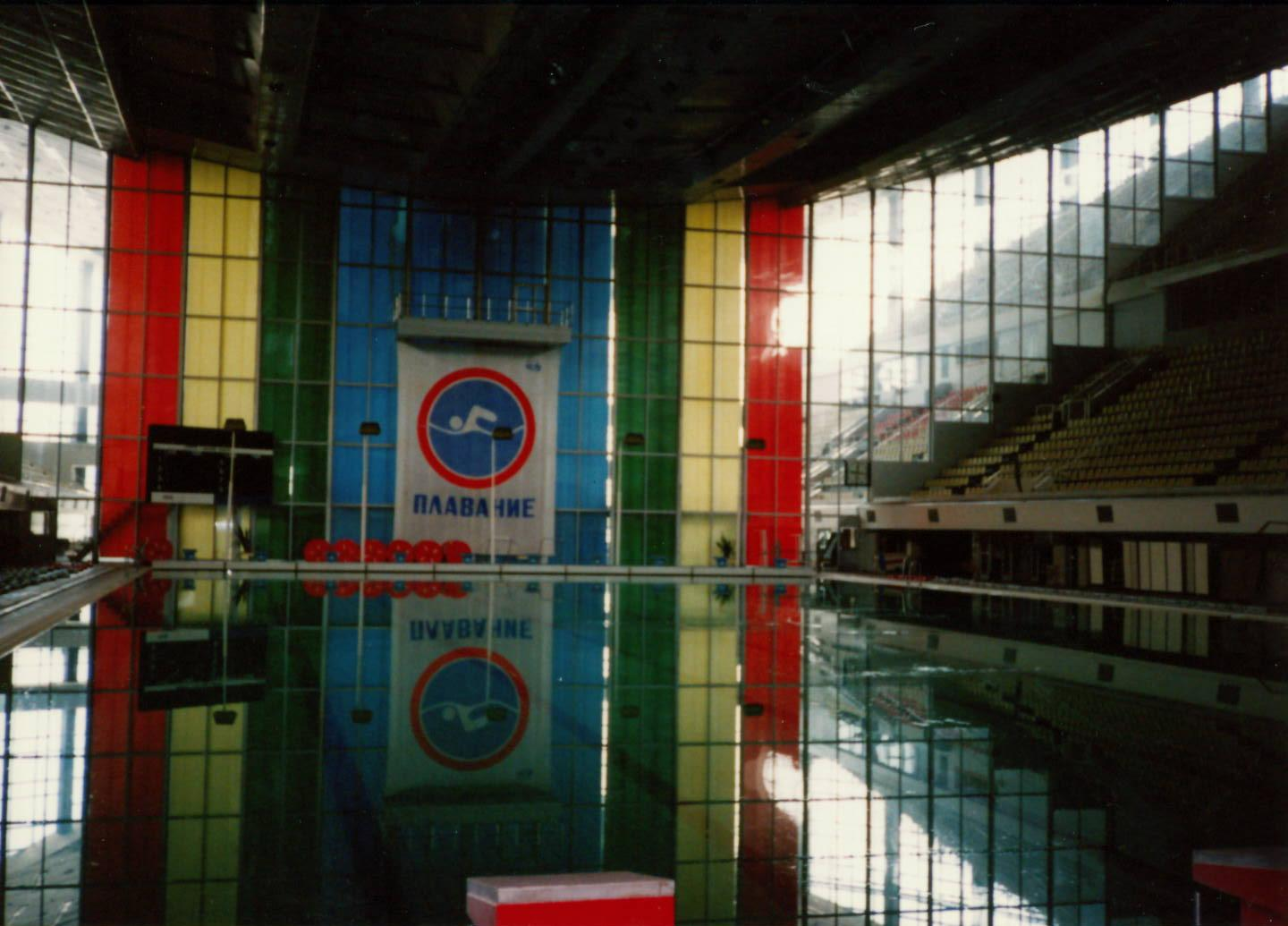
- Olimpiysky Pool, Moscow, as seen in 1991
- Venue: Olimpiysky Sports Complex
- Competitors: 333 from 41 nations

Swimming as usual was one of the three aquatics disciplines at the 1980 Summer Olympics—the other two being Water Polo and Diving. It was held in the Swimming Pool of the Olimpiysky Sports Complex between July 20 and July 27. There was a total of 333 participants from 41 countries competing.

Because the number of participants was reduced by the boycott, FINA broke format by doing away with the semifinals. Instead, the top 8 finishers from the heats qualified directly for the final, or final A as it was called. In events up to 400 m, those that finished 9th to 16th in the heats would swim in Final B for the 9th place after the swimmers from Final A swam. This would continue as the Olympic format up to the 1996 Olympic Games.

== Participating nations ==
333 swimmers from 41 nations competed.

- Algeria (5)
- Angola (5)
- Australia (17)
- Austria (5)
- Belgium (7)
- Brazil (9)
- Bulgaria (13)
- Colombia (2)
- Costa Rica (2)
- Cyprus (4)
- Czechoslovakia (5)
- Denmark (1)
- East Germany (30)
- Ecuador (2)
- Finland (1)
- France (13)
- Great Britain (29)
- Greece (2)
- Hungary (13)
- Ireland (3)
- Italy (13)
- Kuwait (3)
- Lebanon (2)
- Libya (4)
- Madagascar (3)
- Mexico (7)
- Mozambique (5)
- Netherlands (12)
- Nicaragua (1)
- Peru (4)
- Poland (8)
- Portugal (2)
- Romania (5)
- Soviet Union (39)
- Spain (11)
- Sweden (24)
- Switzerland (3)
- Venezuela (3)
- Vietnam (11)
- Yugoslavia (3)
- Zimbabwe (2)

== Medal table ==
* Host nation (Soviet Union)

Rank	Nation	Gold	Silver	Bronze	Total
1	East Germany	12	10	8	30
2	Soviet Union*	8	9	5	22
3	Sweden	2	2	1	5
4	Australia	2	0	5	7
5	Great Britain	1	3	1	5
6	Hungary	1	2	1	4
7	Brazil	0	0	1	1
7	Denmark	0	0	1	1
7	Netherlands	0	0	1	1
7	Poland	0	0	1	1
7	Spain	0	0	1	1
Totals (11 entries)		26	26	26	78

== Men's events ==
Games	Gold		Silver		Bronze	
100 m freestyle	Jörg Woithe; East Germany	50.40	Per Holmertz; Sweden	50.91	Per Johansson; Sweden	51.29
200 m freestyle	Sergey Koplyakov; Soviet Union	1:49.81; OR	Andrey Krylov; Soviet Union	1:50.76	Graeme Brewer; Australia	1:51.60
400 m freestyle	Vladimir Salnikov; Soviet Union	3:51.31; OR	Andrey Krylov; Soviet Union	3:53.24	Ivar Stukolkin; Soviet Union	3:53.95
1500 m freestyle	Vladimir Salnikov; Soviet Union	14:58.27; WR	Aleksandr Chayev; Soviet Union	15:14.30	Max Metzker; Australia	15:14.49
100 m backstroke	Bengt Baron; Sweden	56.53	Viktor Kuznetsov; Soviet Union	56.99	Vladimir Dolgov; Soviet Union	57.63
200 m backstroke	Sándor Wladár; Hungary	2:01.93	Zoltán Verrasztó; Hungary	2:02.40	Mark Kerry; Australia	2:03.14
100 m breaststroke	Duncan Goodhew; Great Britain	1:03.34	Arsens Miskarovs; Soviet Union	1:03.82	Peter Evans; Australia	1:03.96
200 m breaststroke	Robertas Žulpa; Soviet Union	2:15.85	Albán Vermes; Hungary	2:16.93	Arsens Miskarovs; Soviet Union	2:17.28
100 m butterfly	Pär Arvidsson; Sweden	54.92	Roger Pyttel; East Germany	54.94	David López-Zubero; Spain	55.13
200 m butterfly	Sergey Fesenko; Soviet Union	1:59.76	Phil Hubble; Great Britain	2:01.20	Roger Pyttel; East Germany	2:01.39
400 m individual medley	Aleksandr Sidorenko; Soviet Union	4:22.89; OR	Sergey Fesenko; Soviet Union	4:23.43	Zoltán Verrasztó; Hungary	4:24.24
4 × 200 m freestyle relay	Soviet Union; Sergey Kopliakov; Vladimir Salnikov; Ivar Stukolkin; Andrey Krylov; Sergey Rusin*; Sergey Krasyuk*; Yuri Presekin*	7:23.50	East Germany; Frank Pfütze; Jörg Woithe; Detlev Grabs; Rainer Strohbach; Frank Kühne*	7:28.60	Brazil; Jorge Fernandes; Marcus Mattioli; Cyro Marques; Djan Madruga	7:29.30
4 × 100 m medley relay	Australia; Mark Kerry; Peter Evans; Mark Tonelli; Neil Brooks; Glenn Patching*	3:45.70	Soviet Union; Viktor Kuznetsov; Arsens Miskarovs; Yevgeny Seredin; Sergey Kopliakov; Vladimir Shemetov*; Aleksandr Fedorovsky*; Aleksey Markovsky*; Sergey Krasyuk*	3:45.92	Great Britain; Gary Abraham; Duncan Goodhew; David Lowe; Martin Smith; Paul Marshall*; Mark Taylor*	3:47.71

* Swimmers who participated in the heats only and received medals.

== Women's events ==
Games	Gold		Silver		Bronze	
100 m freestyle	Barbara Krause; East Germany	54.79; WR	Caren Metschuck; East Germany	55.16	Ines Diers; East Germany	55.65
200 m freestyle	Barbara Krause; East Germany	1:58.33; OR	Ines Diers; East Germany	1:59.64	Carmela Schmidt; East Germany	2:01.44
400 m freestyle	Ines Diers; East Germany	4:08.76; OR	Petra Schneider; East Germany	4:09.16	Carmela Schmidt; East Germany	4:10.86
800 m freestyle	Michelle Ford; Australia	8:28.90; OR	Ines Diers; East Germany	8:32.55	Heike Dähne; East Germany	8:33.48
100 m backstroke	Rica Reinisch; East Germany	1:00.86; WR	Ina Kleber; East Germany	1:02.07	Petra Riedel; East Germany	1:02.64
200 m backstroke	Rica Reinisch; East Germany	2:11.77; WR	Cornelia Polit; East Germany	2:13.75	Birgit Treiber; East Germany	2:14.14
100 m breaststroke	Ute Geweniger; East Germany	1:10.22	Elvira Vasilkova; Soviet Union	1:10.41	Susanne Nielsson; Denmark	1:11.16
200 m breaststroke	Lina Kačiušytė; Soviet Union	2:29.54; OR	Svetlana Varganova; Soviet Union	2:29.61	Yuliya Bogdanova; Soviet Union	2:32.39
100 m butterfly	Caren Metschuck; East Germany	1:00.42	Andrea Pollack; East Germany	1:00.90	Christiane Knacke; East Germany	1:01.44
200 m butterfly	Ines Geißler; East Germany	2:10.44; OR	Sybille Schönrock; East Germany	2:10.45	Michelle Ford; Australia	2:11.66
400 m individual medley	Petra Schneider; East Germany	4:36.29; WR	Sharron Davies; Great Britain	4:46.83	Agnieszka Czopek; Poland	4:48.17
4 × 100 m freestyle relay	East Germany; Barbara Krause; Caren Metschuck; Ines Diers; Sarina Hülsenbeck; Carmela Schmidt*	3:42.71; WR	Sweden; Carina Ljungdahl; Tina Gustafsson; Agneta Mårtensson; Agneta Eriksson; Birgitta Jönsson*; Helena Peterson*	3:48.93	Netherlands; Conny van Bentum; Wilma van Velsen; Reggie de Jong; Annelies Maas	3:49.51
4 × 100 m medley relay	East Germany; Rica Reinisch; Ute Geweniger; Andrea Pollack; Caren Metschuck; Sarina Hülsenbeck*	4:06.67; WR	Great Britain; Helen Jameson; Margaret Kelly; Ann Osgerby; June Croft	4:12.24	Soviet Union; Yelena Kruglova; Elvira Vasilkova; Alla Grishchenkova; Natalya Strunnikova; Irina Aksyonova*; Olga Klevakina*	4:13.61

* Swimmers who participated in the heats only and received medals.

== Gallery of the medalists ==
Some of the Olympic medalists in Moscow:

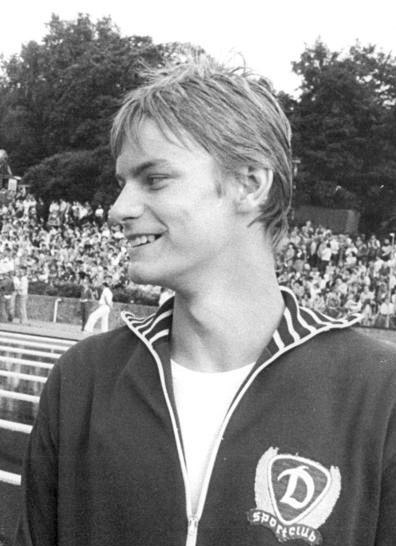
Jörg Woithe, winner of the 100-metre freestyle.

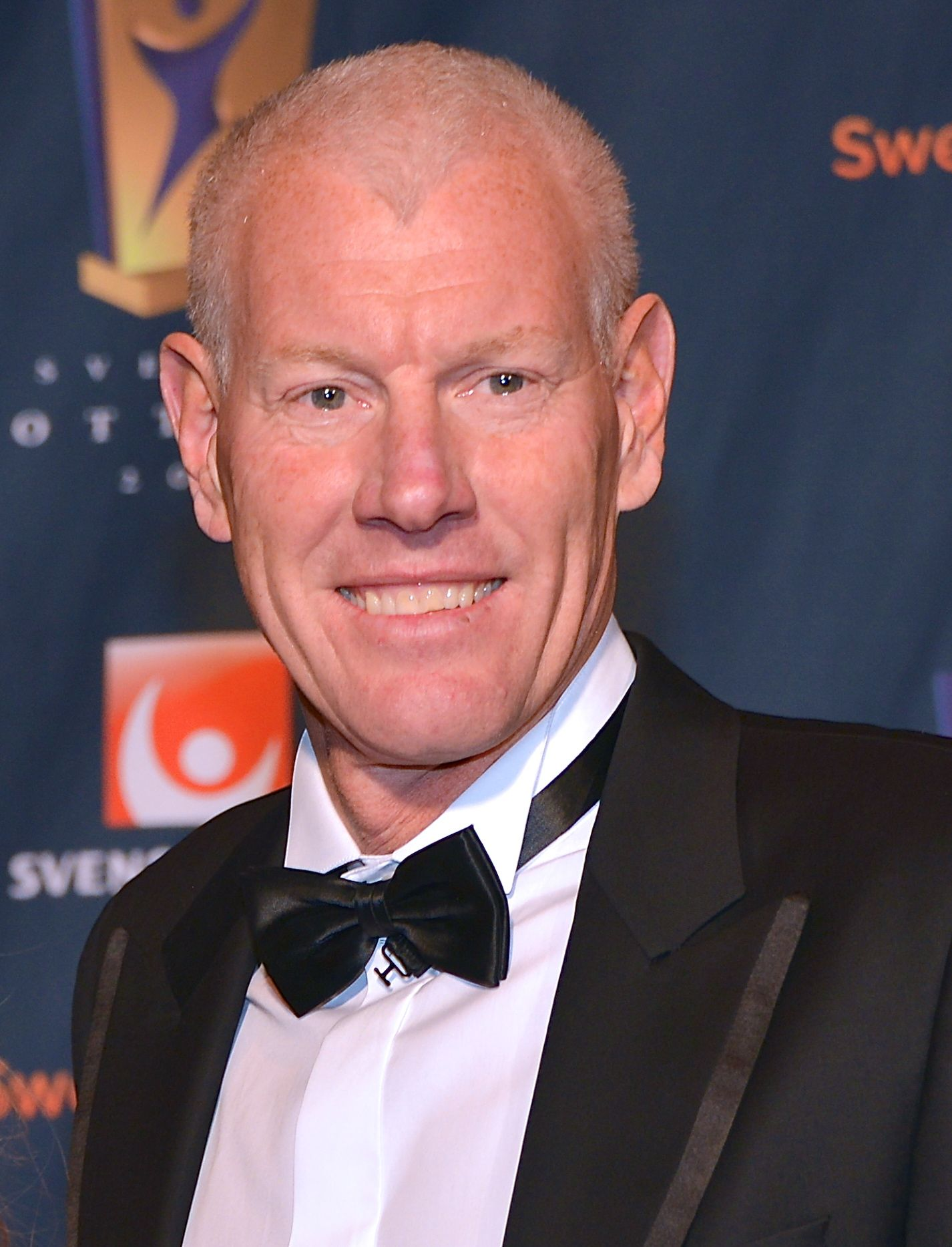
Bengt Baron, winner of the 100-metre backstroke.

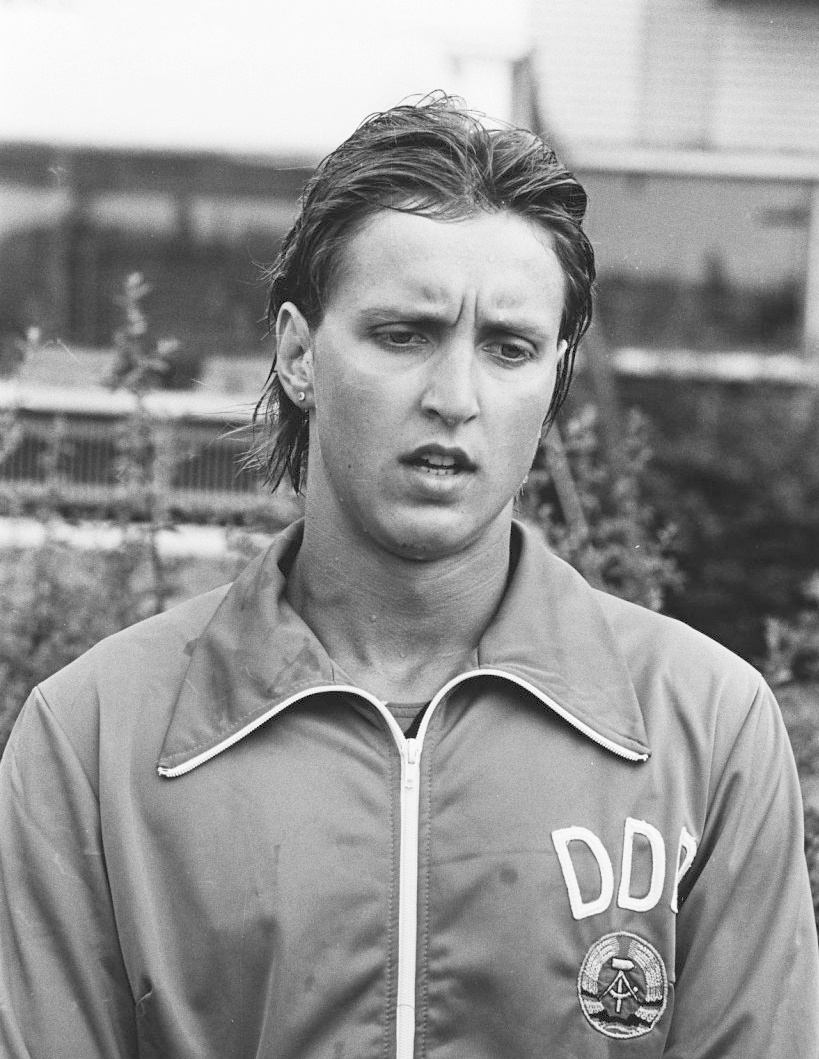
Barbara Krause, winner of the 100-metre freestyle, 200-metre freestyle, and 4 × 100-metre freestyle relay.

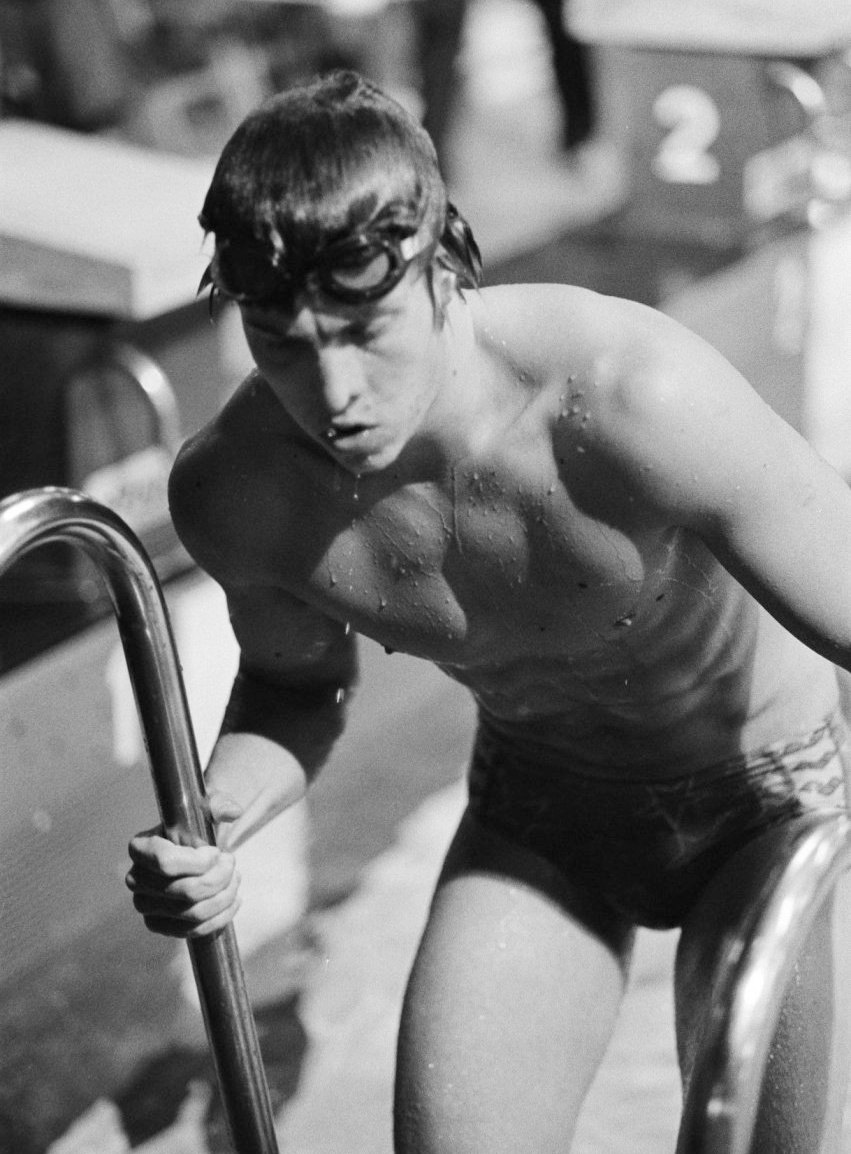
Vladimir Salnikov, winner of the 400-metre freestyle, 1500-metre freestyle, and 4 × 200-metre freestyle relay.

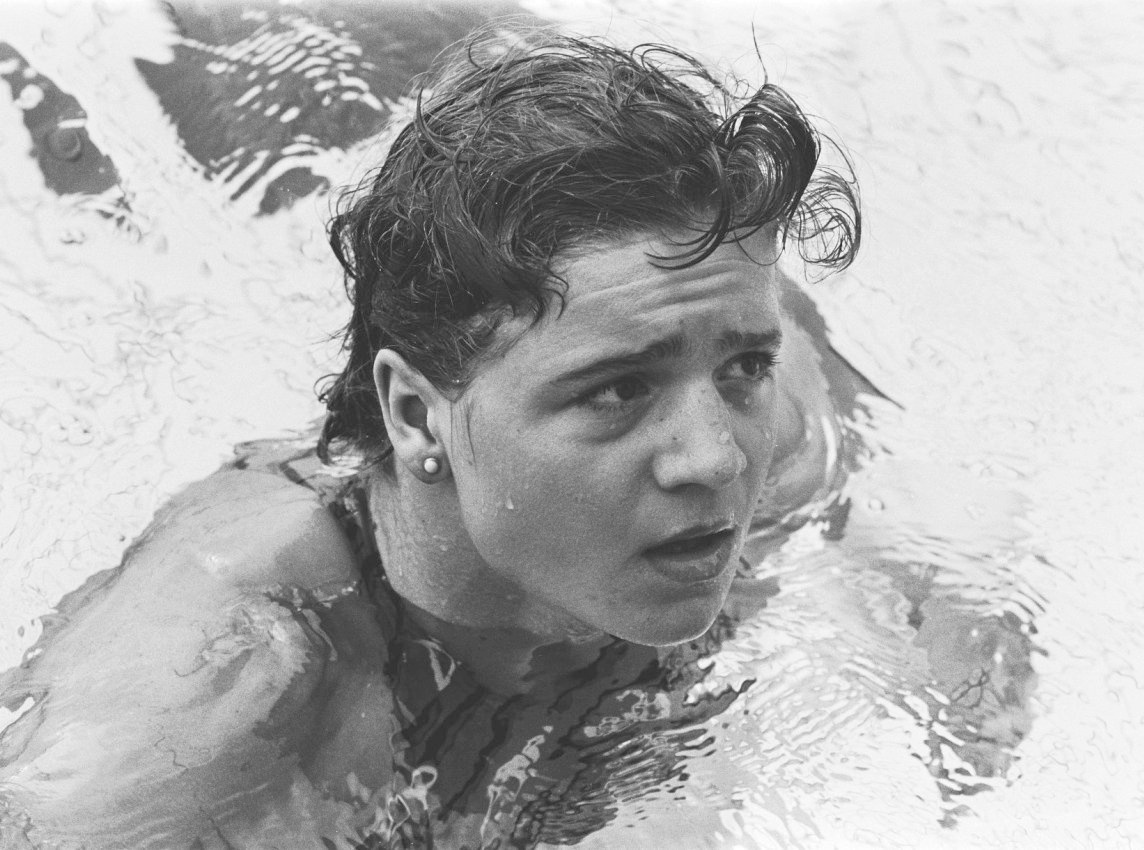
Petra Schneider, winner of the 400-metre individual medley.
