= Tina Gustafsson =

Swedish swimmer

Medal record

Women's swimming

Representing Sweden

Olympic Games
Silver medal – second place	1980 Moscow	4x100 m freestyle

Tina Isabel Gustafsson (born 30 September 1962 in Norrköping, Östergötland) is a former Swedish freestyle swimmer. She won a silver medal in 4 × 100 m freestyle relay at the 1980 Summer Olympics in Moscow along with Carina Ljungdahl, Agneta Mårtensson and Agneta Eriksson.

== Personal bests ==
=== Long course (50 m) ===
Event	Time		Date	Meet	Location	Ref
200 m freestyle	2:03.34	4th	15 Aug 1981	European Championships	Split (city), Socialist Federal Republic of Yugoslavia	

Legend: WR – World record; ER – European record; NR – Swedish record;
Records not set in finals: h – heat; sf – semifinal; r – relay 1st leg; rh – relay heat 1st leg; b – B final; † – en route to final mark; tt – time trial

== Clubs ==
- Norrköpings KK
