= Peru at the 1980 Summer Olympics =

- IOC code: PER
- NOC: Peruvian Olympic Committee

in Moscow
- Competitors: 30 (14 men/16 women)
- Medals: Gold 0 Silver 0 Bronze 0 Total 0

Summer Olympics appearances (overview)
- 1900; 1904–1932; 1936; 1948; 1952; 1956; 1960; 1964; 1968; 1972; 1976; 1980; 1984; 1988; 1992; 1996; 2000; 2004; 2008; 2012; 2016; 2020; 2024

Peru competed at the 1980 Summer Olympics in Moscow, USSR.

== Results by event ==
=== Athletics ===
Men's 100 metres

- José Luis Elias

- Heat — 13.66 (→ did not advance)

Men's 200 metres

- José Luis Elias

- Heat — did not start (→ did not advance)

Men's Long Jump

- Ronald Raborg

- Qualification — 6.85 m (→ did not advance)

Men's Decathlon

- Miro Ronac

- Final — did not finish (→ no ranking)

Women's 100 metres

- Carmela Bolivár

- Heat — 12.07 (→ did not advance)

Women's Javelin Throw

- Patricia Guerrero

- Qualification — 45.42 m (→ did not advance)

=== Swimming ===
Women's 100 m Breaststroke

- María Pia Ayora

- Heats — 1:20.46 (→ did not advance)

Women's 400 m Individual Medley

- María Pia Ayora

- Heats — 5:27.19 (→ did not advance)

=== Volleyball ===
==== Women's team competition ====
- Preliminary Round (Group A)

- Lost to Soviet Union (1-3)
- Lost to Cuba (0-3)
- Lost to East Germany (2-3)

- Classification Match

- 5th/6th place: Lost to Cuba (1-3) → 6th place

- Team Roster

- Carmen Pimentel
- Gabriela Cardenas
- Rosa García
- Raquel Chumpitaz
- Ana Cecilia Carrillo
- Maria del Risco
- Cecilia Tait
- Silvia Leon
- Denisse Fajardo
- Aurora Heredia
- Gina Torrealva
- Natalia Málaga
