= Gloria Casado =

Spanish swimmer

Personal information
- Born: April 14, 1963 (age 63)

Sport
- Sport: Swimming

Gloria Casado (born 14 April 1963) is a Spanish former freestyle swimmer who competed in the 1980 Summer Olympics.
