= Margarita Armengol =

Spanish swimmer

Personal information
- Born: May 17, 1960 (age 66) Barcelona, Spain

Sport
- Sport: Swimming

Margarita Armengol Fuster (Note: In this Spanish name, the first or paternal surname is Armengol and the second or maternal family name is Fuster.) (born 17 May 1960) is a Spanish former freestyle swimmer who competed in the 1980 Summer Olympics.
