= Carina Ljungdahl =

Swedish swimmer

Personal information
- Born: 21 February 1960 (age 66) Filipstad, Värmland, Sweden
Medal record
Women's swimming
Representing Sweden
Olympic Games
Silver medal – second place	1980 Moscow	4x100 m freestyle

Anita Carina Ljungdahl (born 21 February 1960 in Filipstad, Värmland) is a Swedish former freestyle swimmer. She won a silver medal in 4 × 100 m freestyle relay at the 1980 Summer Olympics in Moscow along with Tina Gustafsson, Agneta Mårtensson, Agneta Eriksson.

== Clubs ==
- Filipstads IF
