= Karen Van de Graaf =

Australian swimmer

Karin Van de Graaf
Personal information
- Born: September 3, 1962 (age 63)

Sport
- Sport: Swimming

Karin Van de Graaf (born September 3, 1962) is an Australian swimmer. She competed in five events at the 1980 Summer Olympics.
