= Annelies Maas =

Dutch swimmer (born 1960)

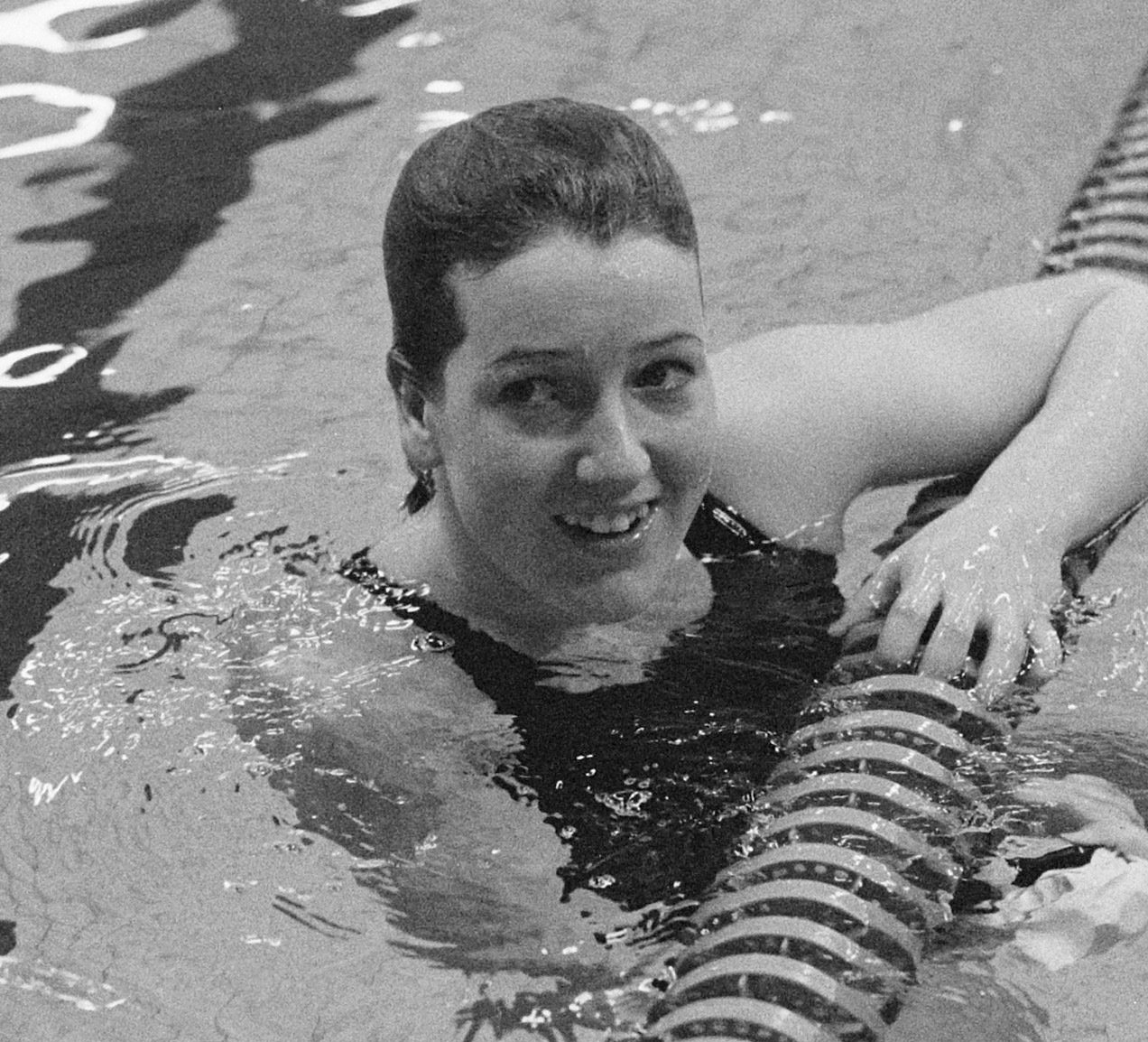
- Annelies Maas in 1982

Medal record

Women's swimming

Representing the Netherlands

Olympic Games
Bronze medal – third place	1980 Moscow	4×100 m freestyle

World Championships (LC)
Bronze medal – third place	1982 Guayaquil	200 m freestyle
Bronze medal – third place	1982 Guayaquil	4×100 m freestyle

European Championships (LC)
Silver medal – second place	1977 Jönköping	400 m freestyle
Silver medal – second place	1977 Jönköping	800 m freestyle
Silver medal – second place	1977 Jönköping	4×100 m freestyle
Bronze medal – third place	1977 Jönköping	200 m freestyle

Summer Universiade
Gold medal – first place	1979 Mexico City	200 m freestyle
Silver medal – second place	1979 Mexico City	800 m freestyle
Bronze medal – third place	1979 Mexico City	100 m freestyle
Bronze medal – third place	1979 Mexico City	400 m freestyle

Annelies Maas (born 25 January 1960 in Wageningen) is a former freestyle swimmer from the Netherlands, who competed in two consecutive Summer Olympics for her native country, starting in 1976.

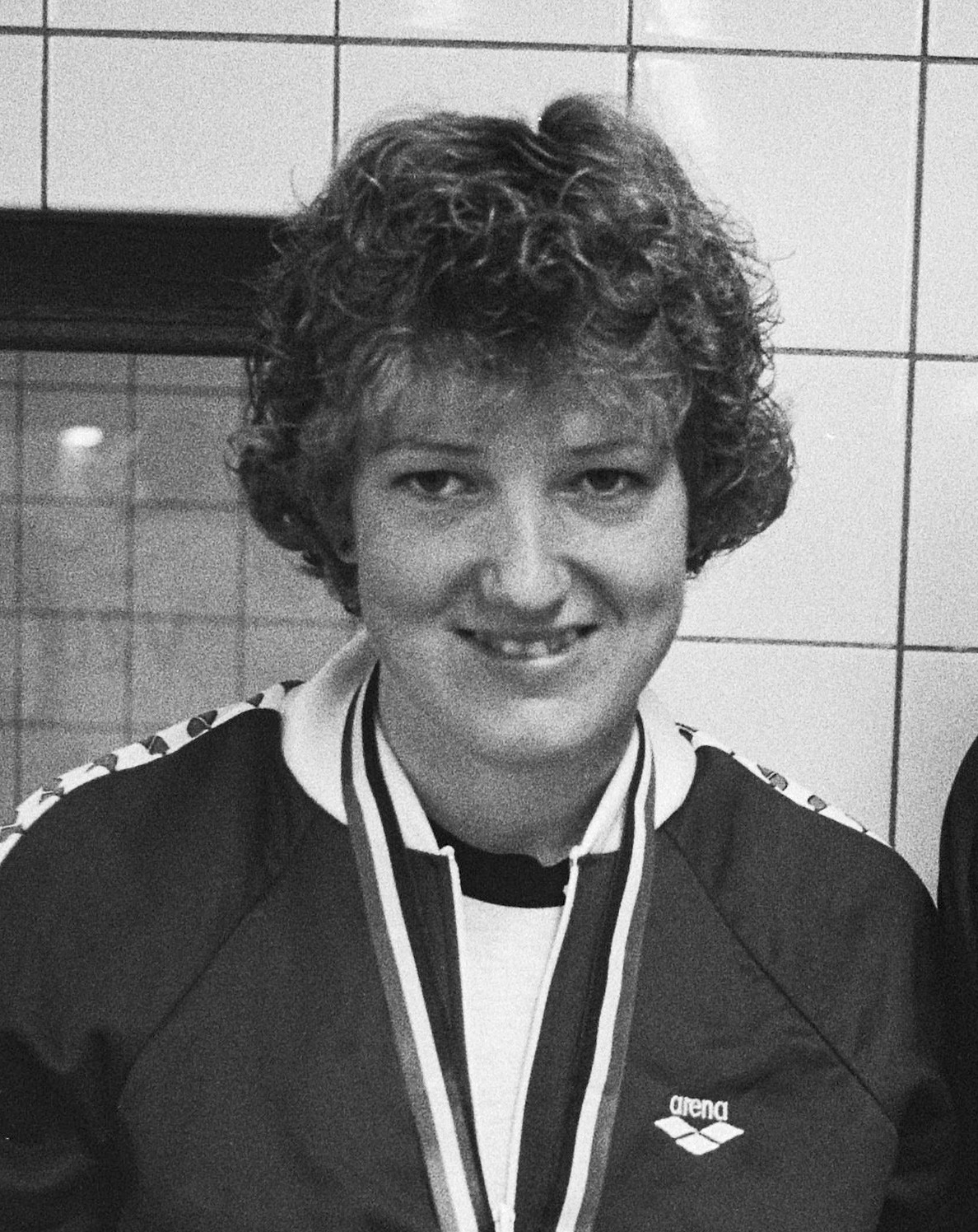
Annelies Maas in 1979

At her second Olympic appearance she won the bronze medal in the 4×100 m freestyle relay, alongside Conny van Bentum, Reggie de Jong and Wilma van Velsen. Her best individual finish was the fourth place in the 200 m freestyle at the Montreal Games (1976).

== See also ==
- Dutch records in swimming
