= Helen Plaschinski =

Mexican swimmer (born 1963)

Personal information
- Born: April 8, 1963 (age 63)
Medal record
Women's Swimming
Representing Mexico
Pan American Games
Bronze medal – third place	1979 San Juan	4x100m Freestyle
Bronze medal – third place	1979 San Juan	4x100m Medley
Maccabiah Games
Gold medal – first place	1977 Ramat Gan	100 m freestyle
Gold medal – first place	1981 Ramat Gan	100 m freestyle
Gold medal – first place	1981 Ramat Gan	200 m freestyle

Helen Plaschinski Farca (born April 8, 1963) is a former female freestyle swimmer from Mexico, who participated in the 1980 Summer Olympics for her native country. She scored sixth place at Moscow in the Women's 4 × 100 m Freestyle Relay.

She competed in the 1977 Maccabiah Games (as a 14 year old) and the 1981 Maccabiah Games in Israel. In each, she won gold medals in the 100 and 200 m freestyle.
