= Agneta Eriksson =

Swedish swimmer (born 1965)

Personal information
- Born: 3 May 1965 (age 61) Västerås, Västmanland, Sweden

Sport
- Sport: Swimming
Medal record
Women's swimming
Representing Sweden
Olympic Games
Silver medal – second place	1980 Moscow	4×100 m freestyle
European Championships (LC)
Bronze medal – third place	1985 Sofia	4×200 m freestyle

Berith Agneta Eriksson (born 3 May 1965 in Västerås, Västmanland) is a Swedish former freestyle swimmer. Aged fifteen she won a silver medal in 4 × 100 m freestyle relay at the 1980 Summer Olympics in Moscow along with Carina Ljungdahl, Tina Gustafsson and Agneta Mårtensson. She also competed in the 1984 and 1988 Summer Olympics.

Eriksson represented Västerås SS.

== Personal bests ==
=== Long course (50 m) ===
Event	Time	Date	Meet	Location	Ref
100 m freestyle	56.90	1 Aug 1982	World Championships	Guayaquil, Ecuador	
200 m freestyle	2:03.07	30 May 1982	-	Volgograd, Soviet Union	
100 m butterfly	1:01.67	21 Dec 1987	-	Orlando, FL, United States	

Legend: WR – World record; ER – European record; NR – Swedish record;
Records not set in finals: h – heat; sf – semifinal; r – relay 1st leg; rh – relay heat 1st leg; b – B final; † – en route to final mark; so – swim-off; tt – time trial

== Clubs ==
- Västerås SS

== Sources ==
- Evans, Hilary; Gjerde, Arild; Heijmans, Jeroen; Mallon, Bill; et al. "Agneta Eriksson". Olympics at Sports-Reference.com. Sports Reference LLC. Archived from the original on 17 April 2020.
