= Reggie de Jong =

Dutch swimmer (born 1964)

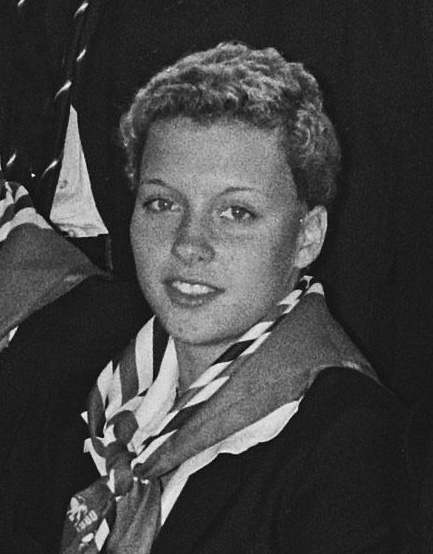
- Reggie de Jong in 1980

Personal information
- Born: 7 January 1964 (age 62) Hilversum, the Netherlands
- Height: 1.68 m (5 ft 6 in)
- Weight: 55 kg (121 lb)

Sport
- Sport: Swimming
- Club: De Robben, Hilversum
Medal record
Representing the Netherlands
Olympic Games
Bronze medal – third place	1980 Moscow	4×100 m freestyle
European Championships
Bronze medal – third place	1983 Rome	4×200 m freestyle

Regina Constance de Jong (born 7 January 1964) is a former freestyle swimmer from the Netherlands, who competed for her native country in the 1980 Summer Olympics. There she won the bronze medal in the 4×100 m freestyle relay, alongside Conny van Bentum, Annelies Maas and Wilma van Velsen. Her best individual finish was fifth place (2:02.76) in the 200 m freestyle. In 1983, she won a bronze medal in the 4 × 200 m freestyle relay at the 1983 European Aquatics Championships.

After retiring from swimming she made a successful business career. She graduated in e-commerce and business management from Georgetown University, Washington, US. She then became director of marketing and corporate communication at Inter Access Group and director of corporate communications at Oracle Netherlands. In 1997, she was one of the founders and the commercial director of Stater Portfolio Performance Management, a European provider of mortgage loans. She then became director at the ForeSure Group and VisionWaves Finance. From November 2006 till June 2008 she was a leading manager (CIO) and a board member of DSB Bank. Between June 2008 and June 2009 she was the Managing Director of Ordina BPO.
