= Laura Flaqué =

Spanish swimmer

Personal information
- Full name: Laura Flaqué Centellas
- Born: 21 August 1963 (age 61); Barcelona, Spain

Sport
- Sport: Swimming

Laura Flaqué Centellas (Note: In this Spanish name, the first or paternal surname is Flaqué and the second or maternal family name is Centellas.) (born 21 August 1963) is a Spanish former freestyle swimmer who competed in the 1980 Summer Olympics.
