= Irina Aksyonova =

Russian swimmer

Personal information
- Born: 24 September 1962 (age 63)
- Height: 1.74 m (5 ft 9 in)
- Weight: 62 kg (137 lb)

Sport
- Sport: Swimming
- Club: Lokomotiv St. Petersburg
Medal record
Representing Soviet Union
Olympic Games
| Bronze medal – third place | 1980 Moscow | 4×100 m medley |
World Championships
| Bronze medal – third place | 1978 Berlin | 4×100 m medley |

Irina Anatolyevna Aksyonova (also Aksenova, Russian: Ирина Анатольевна Аксёнова; born 24 September 1962) is a Russian retired swimmer. She won bronze medals in the 4 × 100 m medley relay at the 1978 World Aquatics Championships and 1980 Summer Olympics, where she swam for the Soviet Union team in the preliminaries. At the 1980 Olympics she also finished fourth in the 800 m, fifth in the 400 m and eighth in the 200 m freestyle events.

Between 1977 and 1980 she won seven national titles and set five national records in 200–800 m freestyle events. However, when her medley relay team finished third at the 1978 World Championships, she was swimming the 100 m butterfly leg. Currently she lives in Czech Republic.
