= Isabel Reuss =

Mexican swimmer (born 1962)

Personal information
- Born: 10 April 1962 (age 64)
Medal record
Women's swimming
Representing Mexico
Pan American Games
Bronze medal – third place	1979 San Juan	4x100m Freestyle

Isabel Reuss Gerding (born April 10, 1962) is a Mexican Olympic freestyle swimmer who participated in the 1980 Summer Olympics for her native country.

Her best result in Moscow, Soviet Union was a sixth place in the Women's 4 × 100 m Freestyle Relay.

As of March 2008, she still holds the oldest swimming Mexican Record with her 2:04.19 in the 200 free (long course) from the 1982 World Championships.
