= Natalya Strunnikova =

Personal information
- Born: March 14, 1964 (age 62) Sverdlovsk, Soviet Union

Sport
- Sport: Swimming
Medal record
Representing the Soviet Union
Olympic Games
Bronze medal – third place	1980 Moscow	4×100 m medley
European Championships (LC)
Silver medal – second place	1981 Split	4×100 m medley

Natalya Strunnikova (Наталья Струнникова, born March 14, 1964) is a bronze medalist in the 1980 Summer Olympics in the women's 4 x 100 meter medley relay.
