= Natalia Más =

Spanish swimmer

Personal information
- Full name: Natalia Más Masdefiol
- Born: 11 August 1963 (age 61); Terrassa, Barcelona, Spain

Sport
- Sport: Swimming

Natalia Más Masdefiol (Note: In this Spanish name, the first or paternal surname is Más and the second or maternal family name is Masdefiol.) (born 11 August 1963) is a Spanish former swimmer who competed in the 1980 Summer Olympics. She competed in the Women's 100 metre freestyle, 200 metre freestyle, 400 metre freestyle, and 4x100 metre freestyle relay. Natalia and her teammate Laura Flaqué were the youngest swimmers from Spain to compete at the 1980 Summer Olympics, at 16 years of age.
