= Jacquelene Willmott =

British swimmer

Personal information
- Full name: Jaquelene Willmott
- Nickname: Jackie
- Nationality: British
- Born: 19 March 1965 (age 61)
- Height: 1.68 m (5 ft 6 in)
- Weight: 55 kg (121 lb)

Sport
- Sport: Swimming
- Strokes: Freestyle
Medal record
Women's swimming
Representing United Kingdom
World Championships
Silver medal – second place	1982 Guayaquil	800 m freestyle
European Championships
Bronze medal – third place	1981 Split	400 m freestyle
Bronze medal – third place	1981 Split	800 m freestyle
Commonwealth Games
Representing England
Gold medal – first place	1982 Brisbane	4×100 m freestyle
Silver medal – second place	1982 Brisbane	400 m freestyle
Bronze medal – third place	1982 Brisbane	800 m freestyle

Jacquelene "Jackie" Willmott (born 19 March 1965) is a retired British swimmer.

== Swimming career ==
She won three medals in the 400 m and 800 m freestyle at the 1981 European Aquatics Championships and 1982 World Aquatics Championships. She competed in five events at the 1980 Summer Olympics with the best achievement of fourth place in the 4×100 metres freestyle relay. She represented England and won a gold medal in the 4 x 100 metres freestyle relay, a silver medal in the 400 metres freestyle and a bronze medal in the 800 metres freestyle, at the 1982 Commonwealth Games in Brisbane, Queensland, Australia.

She won the 1980 ASA National Championship title in the 200 metres freestyle, the 1980, 1981 and 1983 400 metres freestyle title and four consecutive 800 metres freestyle championships.

== Personal life ==
She is not the sister of Olympians Stuart Willmott and Carrie Willmott, and is not the aunt of Olympian Aimee Willmott.

== See also ==
- List of World Aquatics Championships medalists in swimming (women)
