= Swimming Pool at the Olimpiysky Sports Complex =

Swimming venue in Moscow, Russia

Coordinates: 55°46′52″N 37°37′35″E

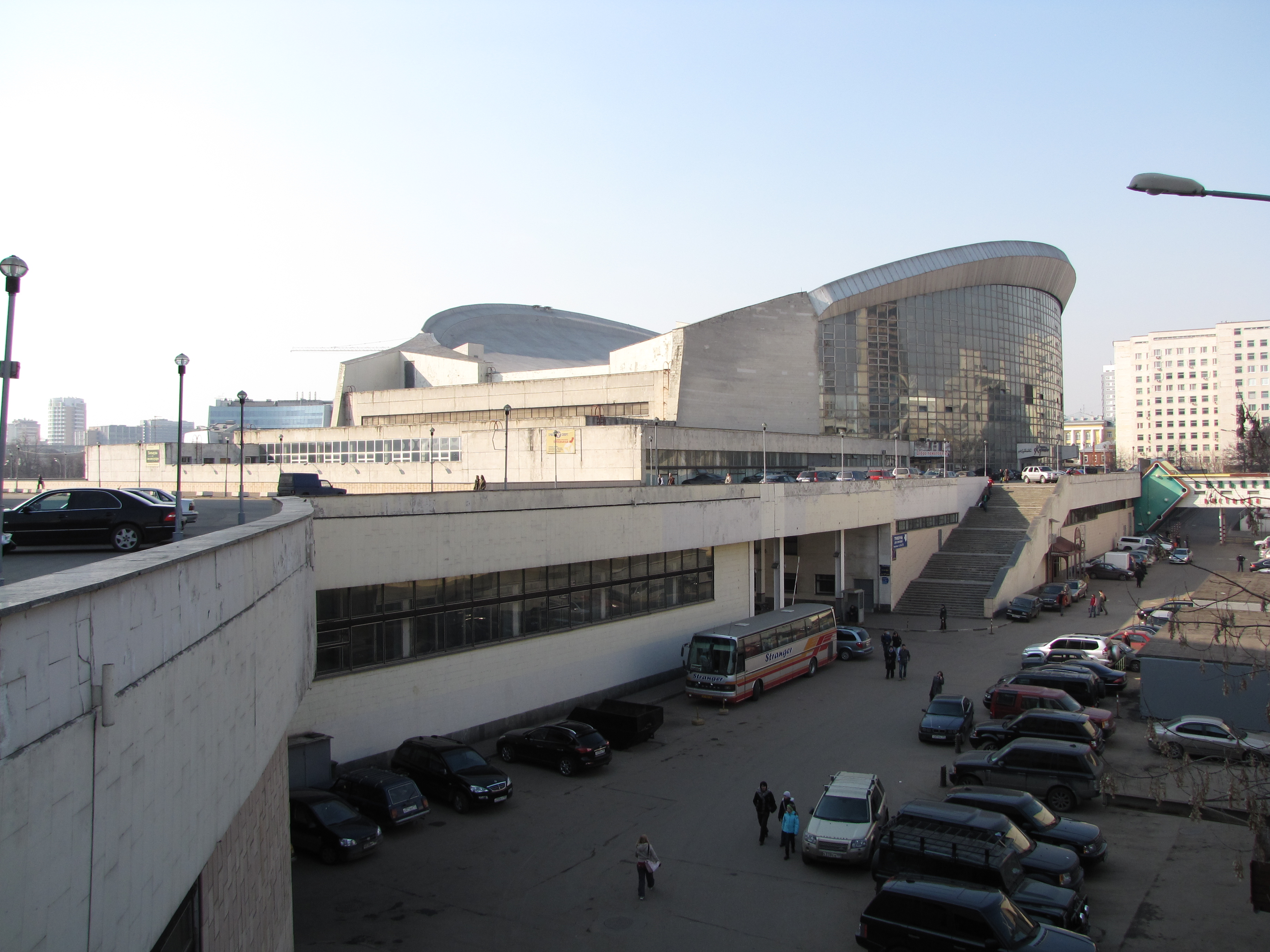
Olimpiysky Pool (2009)

The Swimming Pool at the Olimpiyskiy Sports Complex was a covered swimming centre in Moscow, Russia. Construction took place from 1977 until the summer of 1980. The facility was built for the 1980 Summer Olympics and made up the Olimpiyskiy Sports Complex architectural ensemble together with the Olimpiyskiy Arena.

During the Olympics, it hosted the swimming, diving, and water polo events, as well as the swimming portion of the modern pentathlon events. It also the hosted the 2002 Short Course World Championships. The complex included a 2-meter-deep (6.6 feet) pool measuring 50m by 25m (164 feet by 82 feet) with capacity for 7,500 spectators. It was separated by an acoustic partition from the 6-meter-deep (20 feet) diving pool measuring 35m by 25m (115 feet by 82 feet) with capacity for 4,500 spectators. A training pool, gym, and sauna were also built.

The pool complex was demolished along with main arena in 2020 to make way for a fitness club, cinemas, a planetary, and a concert hall.

== Gallery ==
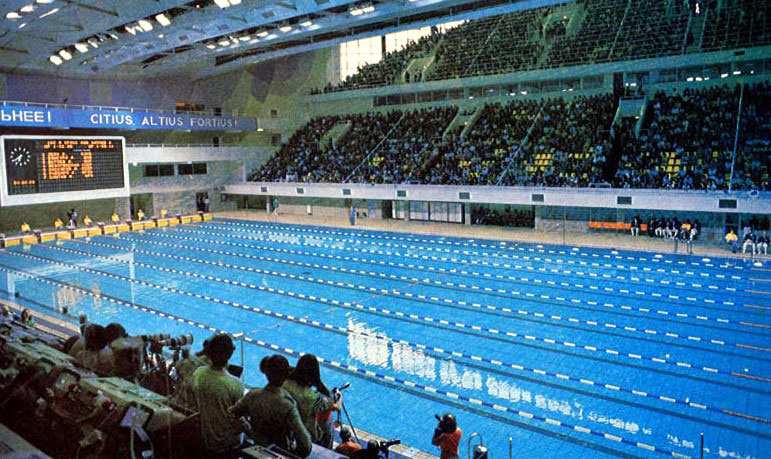
During the 1980 Summer Olympics

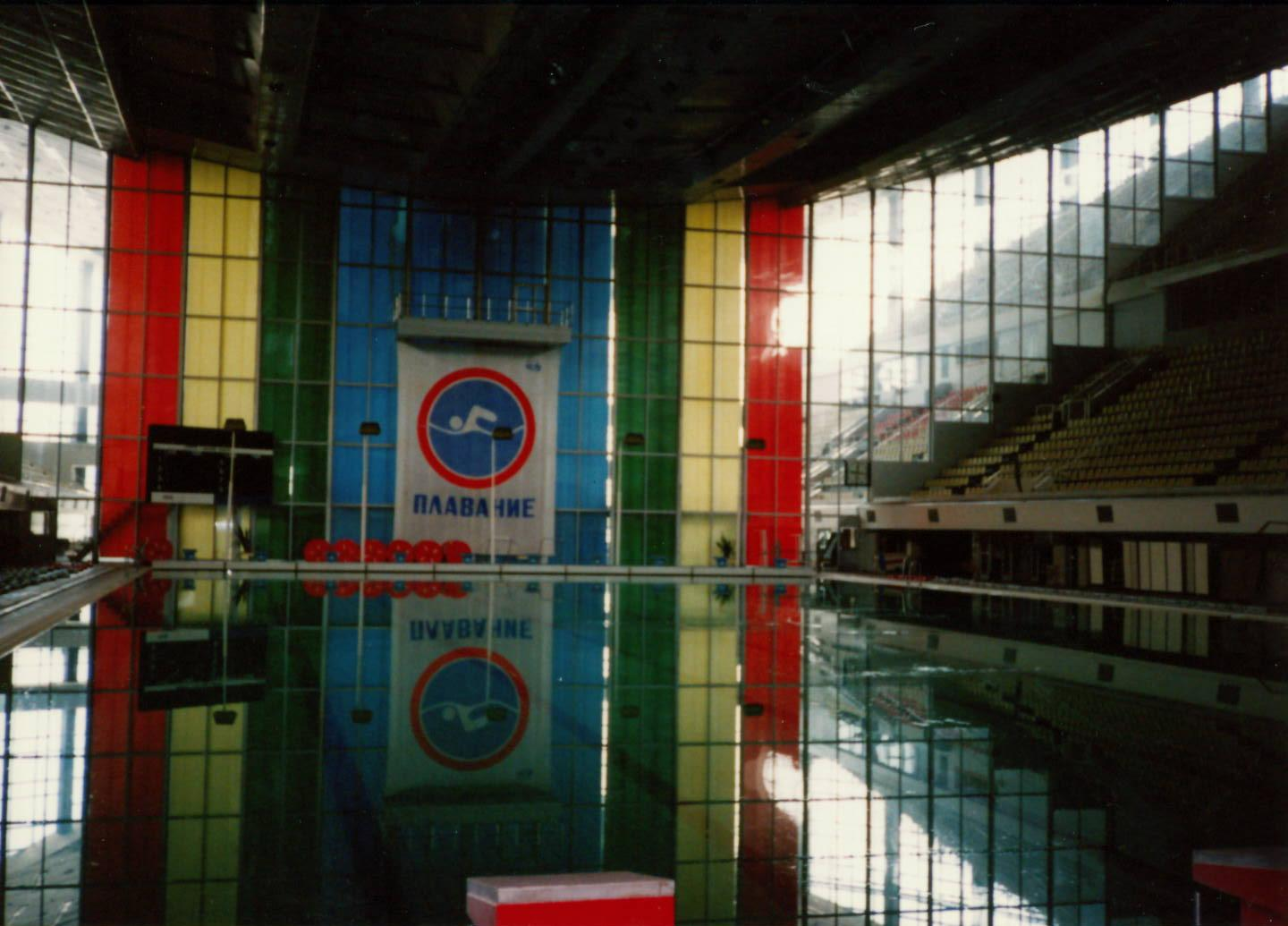
View of the pool in 1991

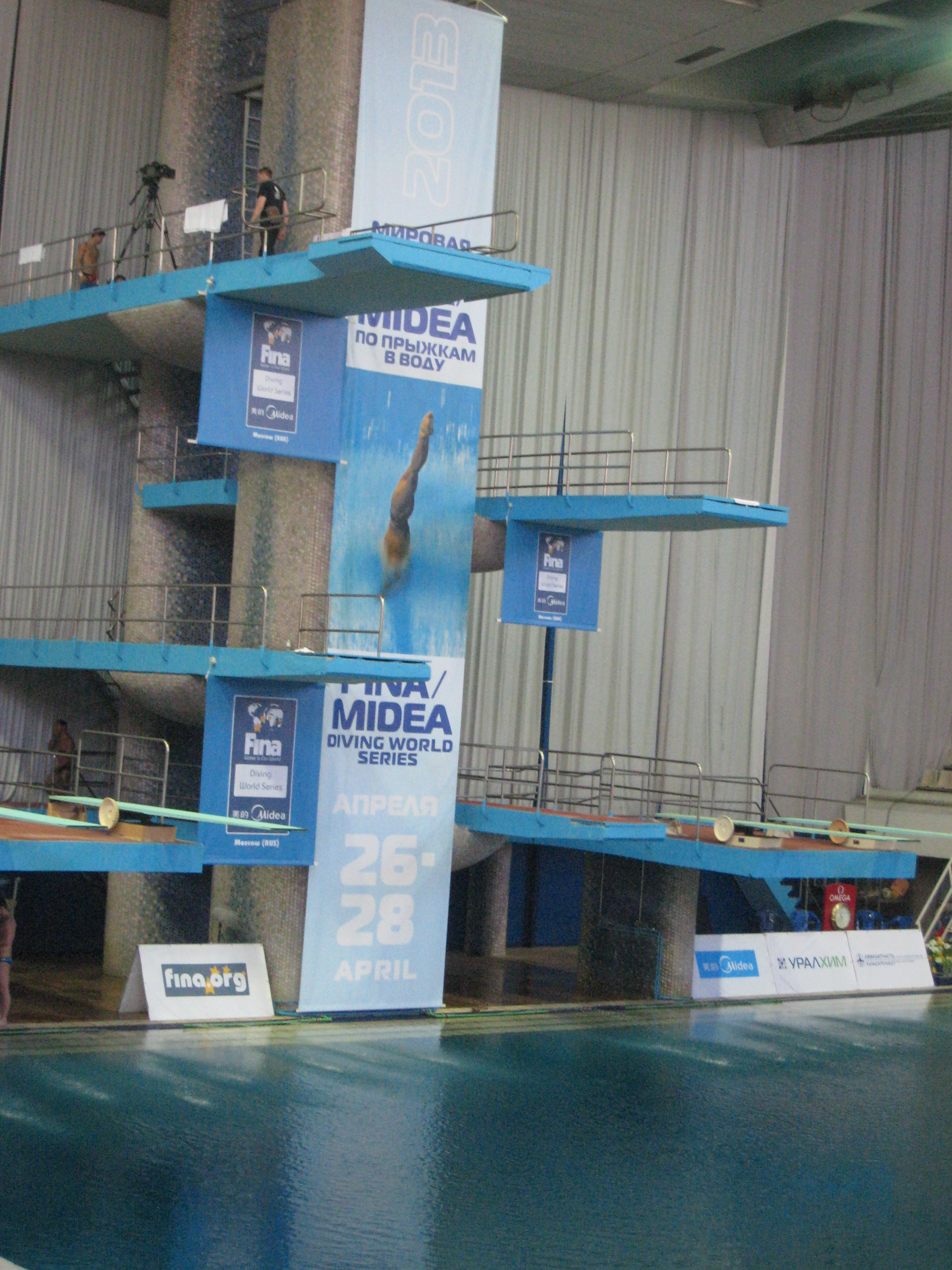
During the 2013 FINA Diving World Series

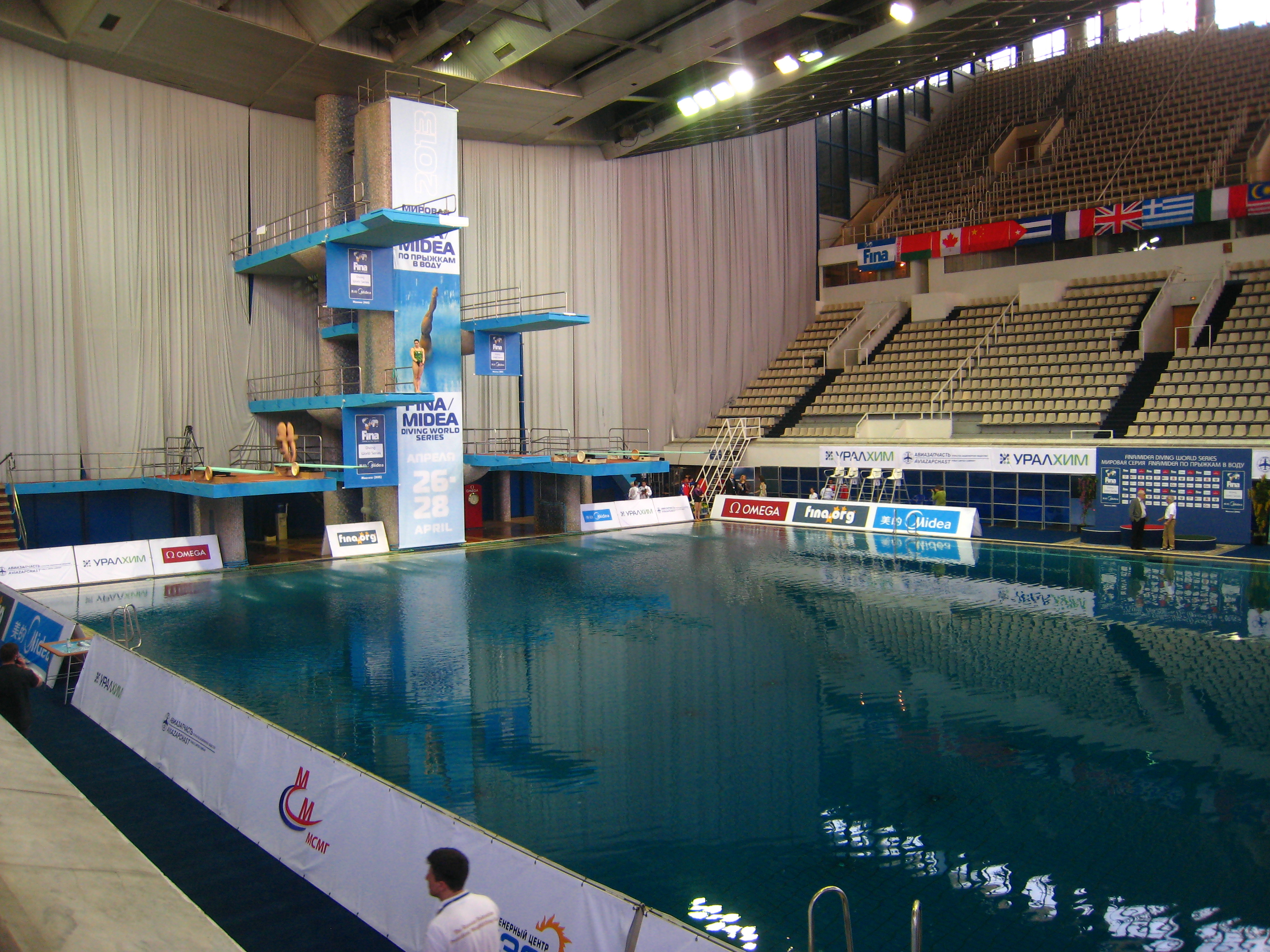
View of the diving tower

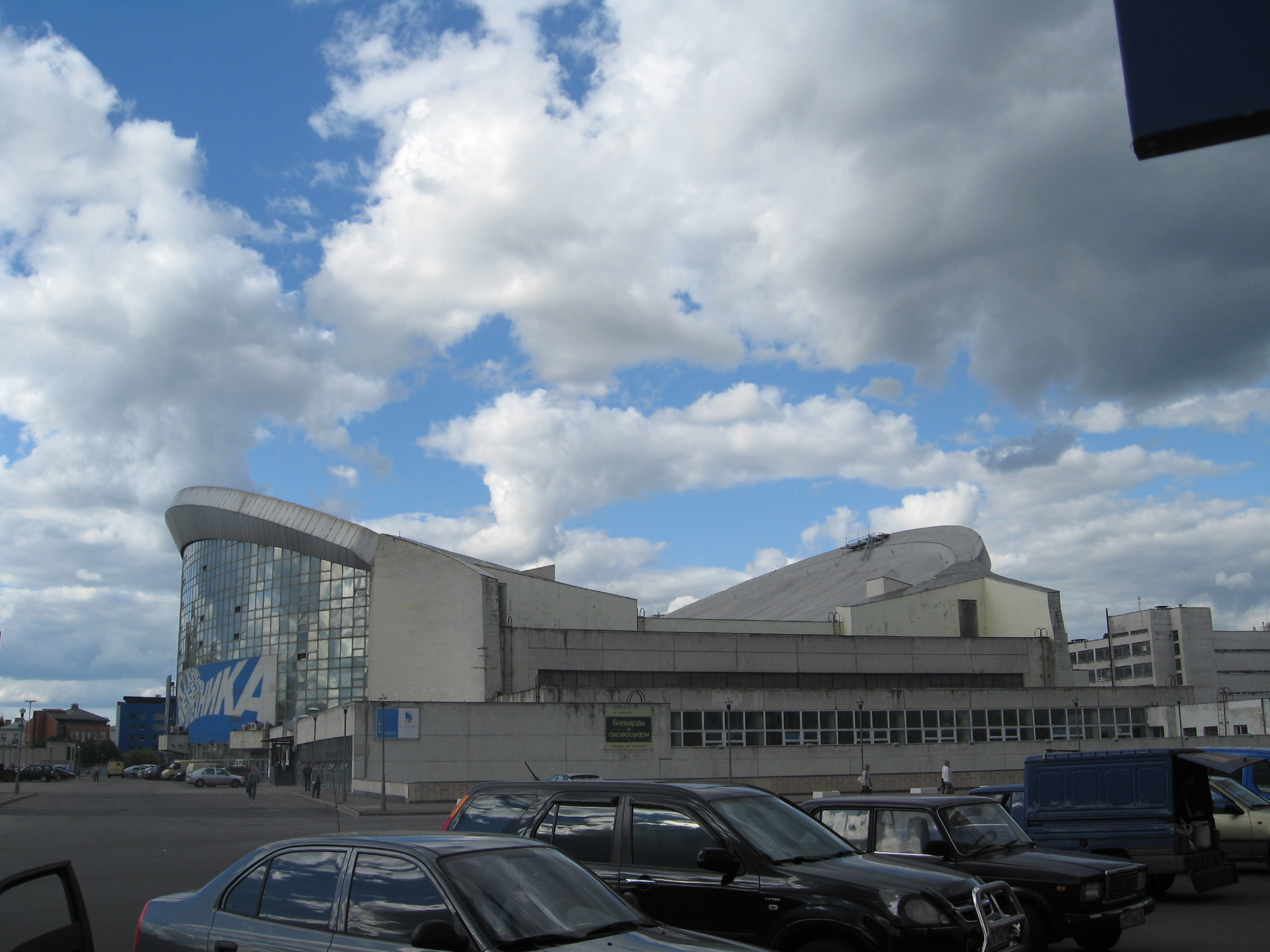
Outside the pool in 2015

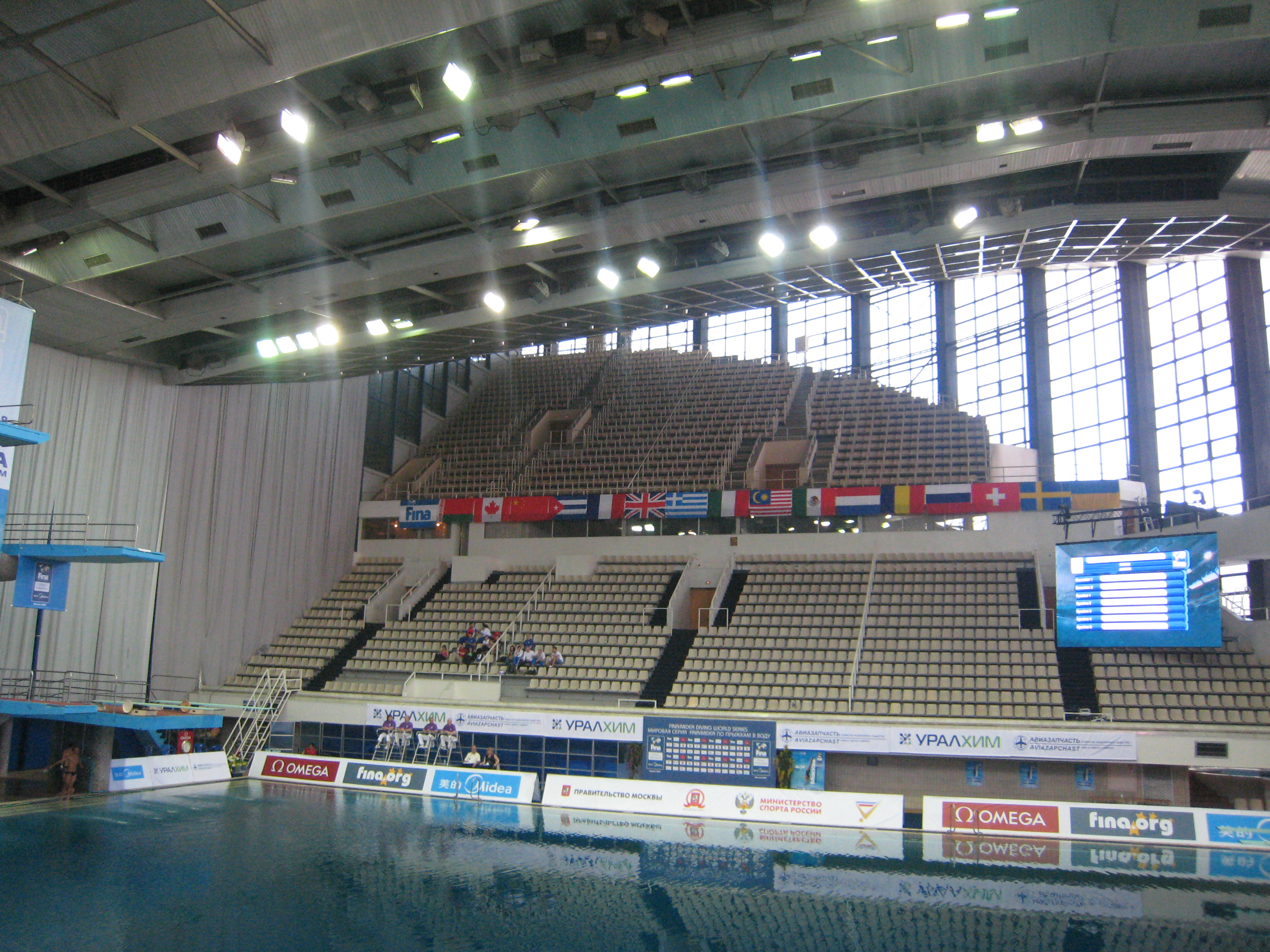
Olimpiysky Pool, Moscow, as seen in 2013

== See also ==
- Olympic Pool at the Luzhniki Olympic Complex
