= Olga Klevakina =

Soviet swimmer (born 1962)

Personal information
- Born: 4 May 1962 (age 64) Salihorsk, Belarus
- Height: 1.71 m (5 ft 7 in)
- Weight: 60 kg (130 lb)

Sport
- Sport: Swimming
- Club: Burevestnik Moscow
Medal record
Women's swimming
Representing the Soviet Union
Summer Olympics
| Bronze medal – third place | 1980 Moscow | 4×100 m medley |
European Championships
| Silver medal – second place | 1977 Jönköping | 4×100 m medley |
| Bronze medal – third place | 1977 Jönköping | 200 m medley |
| Bronze medal – third place | 1981 Split | 200 m medley |
Universiade
| Silver medal – second place | 1981 Bucharest | 200 m freestyle |
| Silver medal – second place | 1981 Bucharest | 200 m medley |
| Silver medal – second place | 1981 Bucharest | 4x100 m freestyle |
| Bronze medal – third place | 1981 Bucharest | 100 m freestyle |
| Bronze medal – third place | 1981 Bucharest | 4x100 m medley |

Olga Mikhaylovna Klevakina (Russian: Ольга Михайловна Клевакина; born 4 April 1962) is a Soviet retired swimmer. She competed at the 1980 Summer Olympics in six events: 100 m, 200 m, 400 m and 4 × 100 m freestyle and 400 m and 4 × 100 m medley, and reached finals in all events but the 4 × 100 m freestyle relay, because her team was disqualified in the preliminaries for an improper changeover. She won a bronze medal in the 4 × 100 m medley relay, where she swam for the Soviet team in the preliminaries, and finished fourth in the 100 m and 200 m freestyle.

She also won three medals at the 1977 and 1981 European Aquatics Championships in individual and team medley events, as well as three medals at the 1981 Summer Universiade.

Klevakina was born in Belarus and then moved to Moscow.
