= Italy at the 1984 Summer Olympics =

- IOC code: ITA
- NOC: Italian National Olympic Committee

in Los Angeles
- Competitors: 268 (222 men, 46 women) in 23 sports
- Flag bearer: Sara Simeoni
- Medals Ranked 5th: Gold 14 Silver 6 Bronze 12 Total 32

Summer Olympics appearances (overview)
- 1896; 1900; 1904; 1908; 1912; 1920; 1924; 1928; 1932; 1936; 1948; 1952; 1956; 1960; 1964; 1968; 1972; 1976; 1980; 1984; 1988; 1992; 1996; 2000; 2004; 2008; 2012; 2016; 2020; 2024

Other related appearances
- 1906 Intercalated Games

Italy competed at the 1984 Summer Olympics in Los Angeles, United States; 268 competitors, 222 men and 46 women, took part in 151 events in 23 sports.

== Medalists ==
=== Gold ===
- Alberto Cova – Athletics, men's 10000 metres
- Alessandro Andrei – Athletics, men's shot put
- Gabriella Dorio – Athletics, women's 1500 metres
- Maurizio Stecca – Boxing, men's bantamweight
- Claudio Vandelli, Marcello Bartalini, Marco Giovannetti, and Eros Poli – Cycling, men's team road race
- Mauro Numa – Fencing, men's Foil individual competition
- Mauro Numa, Angelo Scuri, Andrea Borella, Stefano Cerioni, and Andrea Cipressa – Fencing, men's foil team competition
- Norberto Oberburger – Heavyweight 110 kg
- Vincenzo Maenza – Light Flyweight, men's Greco-Roman wrestling
- Ferdinando Meglio, Giovanni Scalzo, Angelo Arcidiacono, Gianfranco Dalla Barba, and Marco Marin – Fencing, men's Sabre team competition
- Daniele Masala – Modern pentathlon, men's individual competition
- Daniele Masala, Pier Paolo Cristofori, and Carlo Massullo – Modern pentathlon, men's team competition
- Carmine Abbagnale, Giuseppe Abbagnale, and Giuseppe Di Capua – Rowing, men's coxed pairs
- Luciano Giovannetti – Shooting, trap individual competition

=== Silver ===
- Sara Simeoni – Athletics, women's high jump
- Salvatore Todisco – Boxing, men's light flyweight
- Francesco Damiani – Boxing, men's super heavyweight
- Ezio Gamba – Judo, men's lightweight (71 kg)
- Edith Gufler – Shooting, women's air rifle individual competition
- Marco Marin – Fencing, men's sabre

=== Bronze ===
- Maurizio Damilano – Athletics, men's 20 km walk
- Sandro Bellucci – Athletics, men's 50 km walk
- Giovanni Evangelisti – Athletics, men's long jump
- Luciano Bruno – Boxing, men's welterweight
- Angelo Musone – Boxing, men's heavyweight
- Stefano Cerioni – Fencing, men's foil individual competition
- Roberto Manzi, Angelo Mazzoni, Stefano Bellone, Sandro Cuomo, and Cosimo Ferro – Fencing, men's épée team competition
- Dorina Vaccaroni – Fencing, women's foil individual competition
- Carlo Massullo – Modern pentathlon, men's individual competition
- Luca Scribani Rossi – Shooting, skeet individual competition
- Fabio Vullo, Piero Rebaudengo, Paolo Vecchi, Andrea Lucchetta, Pier Paolo Lucchetta, Marco Negri, Guido de Luigi, Giovanni Errichiello, Giovanni Lanfranco, Franco Bertoli, Francesco Dall'Olio, and Giancarlo Dametto – Volleyball, men's team competition
- Giorgio Gorla and Alfio Peraboni – Sailing, men's team competition

== Archery ==
Two time defending bronze medallist Giancarlo Ferrari improved upon his 1980 score, but in the more competitive field in Los Angeles, his ranking fell all the way to 25th place.

Women's individual competition

- Ester Robertson – 2435 points (→ 21st place)

Men's individual competition

- Giancarlo Ferrari – 2455 points (→ 25th place)
- Ilario Di Buò – 2437 points (→ 29th place)

== Athletics ==
Men's competition

Men's 100 metres

- Stefano Tilli
- Antonio Ullo
- Pierfrancesco Pavoni

Men's 200 metres

- Pietro Mennea
- Stefano Tilli
- Carlo Simionato

Men's 800 metres

- Donato Sabia
- Riccardo Materazzi

Men's 1500 metres

- Riccardo Materazzi
- Stefano Mei
- Claudio Patrignani

Men's 5000 metres

- Salvatore Antibo

- Heat – 13:46.32
- Semifinals – 13:47.53 (→ did not advance)

- Piero Selvaggio

- Heat – 14:04.74 (→ did not advance)

- Antonio Selvaggio

- Heat – 13:55.73 (→ did not advance)

Men's 10,000 metres

- Alberto Cova

- Heat – 28:26.10
- Final – 27:47.54 → gold medal

- Salvatore Antibo

- Heat – 28:22.57
- Final – 28:06.50 (→ 4th place)

- Francesco Panetta

- Heat – 29:00.78 (→ did not advance)

Men's marathon

- Giovanni d'Aleo

- Final – 2:20:12 (→ 35th place)

- Marco Marchei

- Final – 2:22:38 (→ 43rd place)

Men's 110 metres hurdles

- Daniele Fontecchio

Men's 3000 metres steeplechase

- Francesco Panetta
- Franco Boffi

Men's 4×100 metres relay

- Antonio Ullo
- Giovanni Bongiorni
- Stefano Tilli
- Pietro Mennea

Men's 4×400 metres relay

- Roberto Tozzi
- Ernesto Nocco
- Roberto Ribaud
- Pietro Mennea
- Donato Sabia
- Mauro Zuliani

Men's long jump

- Giovanni Evangelisti

- Qualification – 7.94m
- Final – 8.24m → bronze medal

Men's triple jump

- Dario Badinelli

- Qualification – 16.13m (→ did not advance)

Men's javelin throw

- Agostino Ghesini

- Qualification – 72.96m (→ did not advance, 23rd place)

Men's pole vault

- Mauro Barella

- Qualifying round – 5.35m
- Final – 5.30m (→ 8th place)

Men's shot put

- Alessandro Andrei

- Qualification – 20.18 m
- Final – 21.26 m → gold medal

- Marco Montelatici

- Qualification – 20.14 m
- Final – 19.98 m (→ 6th place)

Men's discus throw

- Luciano Zerbini

- Final – 63.50m (→ 7th place)

Men's hammer throw

- Orlando Bianchini

- Qualification – 74.02m
- Final – 75.94m (→ 4th place)

- Giampaolo Urlando

- Qualification – 72.42m
- Final – 75.96m (→ finished fourth but was subsequently disqualified as his doping tests proved positive)

- Lucio Serrani

- Qualification – 70.64m (→ did not advance)

Men's 20 km walk

- Maurizio Damilano

- Final – 1:23:26 → bronze medal

- Carlo Mattioli

- Final – 1:25:07 (→ 5th place)

- Alessandro Pezzatini

- Final – 1:32:27 (→ 28th place)

Men's 50 km walk

- Sandro Bellucci

- Final – 3:53:45 → bronze medal

- Raffaello Ducceschi

- Final – 3:59:26 (→ 5th place)

- Maurizio Damilano

- Final – DNF (→ no ranking)

Women's competition

Women's 200 metres

- Marisa Masullo

Women's 400 metres

- Erica Rossi

Women's 800 metres

- Gabriella Dorio

Women's 1500 metres

- Gabriella Dorio

- Heat – 4:04.51
- Final – 4:03.25 → gold medal

Women's 3000 metres

- Agnese Possamai

- Heat – 8.45.84
- Final – 9.10.82 (→ 10th place)

Women's marathon

- Laura Fogli

- Final – 2:29:28 (→ 9th place)

- Alba Milana

- Final – 2:33:01 (→ 12th place)

- Paola Moro

- Final – 2:37:06 (→ 20th place)

Women's 400m hurdles

- Giuseppina Cirulli

- Heat – 57.49
- Semifinal – 56.45 (→ did not advance)

Women's 4×400 metres relay

- Patrizia Lombardo
- Cosetta Campana
- Marisa Masullo
- Erica Rossi
- Giuseppina Cirulli

Women's high jump

- Sara Simeoni

- Qualification – 1.90m
- Final – 2.00m → silver medal

Women's javelin throw

- Fausta Quintavalla

- Qualification – 57.66m (→ did not advance)

== Basketball ==
Men's team competition

- Preliminary round (group A)

- Defeated Egypt (110-62)
- Defeated West Germany (80-72)
- Defeated Brazil (89-78)
- Defeated Australia (93-82)
- Lost to Yugoslavia (65-69)

- Quarterfinals

- Lost to Canada (72-78)

- Classification matches

- 5th/8th place: defeated West Germany (98-71)
- 5th/6th place: defeated Uruguay (111-102) → fifth place

- Team roster

- Carlo Caglieris
- Roberto Premier
- Marco Bonamico
- Enrico Gilardi
- Walter Magnifico
- Roberto Brunamonti
- Renato Villalta
- Dino Meneghin
- Antonello Riva
- Renzo Vecchiato
- Pierluigi Marzorati
- Romeo Sacchetti

== Boxing ==
Men's light flyweight (– 48 kg)

- Salvatore Todisco → silver medal
  1. First round – bye
  2. Second round – defeated Gerard Hawkins (IRL), 5:0
  3. Quarterfinals – defeated Rafael Ramos (PUR), 4:1
  4. Semifinals – defeated Keith Mwila (ZAM), 5:0
  5. Final – lost to Paul Gonzales (USA), walkover

Men's bantamweight (– 54 kg)

- Maurizio Stecca → gold medal
  1. First round – bye
  2. Second round – defeated Phillip Sutcliffe (IRE), 5:0
  3. Third round – defeated Star Zulu (ZAM), 5:0
  4. Quarterfinals – defeated Robinson Pitalua (COL), 5:0
  5. Semifinals – defeated Pedro Nolasco (DOM), 5:0
  6. Final – defeated Héctor Lopez (MEX), 4:1

Men's middleweight (– 75 kg)

- Noe Cruciani
  1. First round – defeated Paul Kamela (CMR), 5:0
  2. Second round – lost to Pedro van Raamsdonk (HOL), 0:5

Men's heavyweight (– 91 kg)

- Angelo Musone → bronze medal
  1. First round – defeated James Omondi (KEN), 5:0
  2. Second round – defeated Kaliq Singh (IND), walkover
  3. Quarterfinals – defeated Hakkan Brock (SWE), 5:0
  4. Semifinals – lost to Henry Tillman (USA), 0:5

Men's super heavyweight (+ 91 kg)

- Francesco Damiani → silver medal
  1. First round – bye
  2. Quarterfinals – defeated Willie Isangura (TNZ), RSC-2
  3. Semifinals – defeated Robert Wells (GBR), RSC-3
  4. Final – lost to Tyrell Biggs (USA), 1:4

== Cycling ==
Twenty-one cyclists represented Italy in 1984. They won gold in the team time trial event.

Men's individual road race

- Alberto Volpi – + 4:10 (→ 13th place)
- Stefano Colagè – did not finish (→ no ranking)
- Roberto Pagnin – did not finish (→ no ranking)
- Renato Piccolo – did not finish (→ no ranking)

Team time trial

- Marcello Bartalini
- Marco Giovannetti
- Eros Poli
- Claudio Vandelli

Sprint

- Gabriele Sella
- Vincenzo Ceci

1000m time trial

- Stefano Baudino

Individual pursuit

- Roberto Calovi
- Maurizio Colombo

Team pursuit

- Roberto Amadio
- Massimo Brunelli
- Maurizio Colombo
- Silvio Martinello

Points race

- Stefano Allocchio
- Silvio Martinello

Women's individual road race

- Maria Canins – 2:11:14 (→ 5th place)
- Luisa Seghezzi – 2:13:28 (→ 9th place)
- Roberta Bonanomi – 2:15:13 (→ 23rd place)
- Emanuela Menuzzo

== Diving ==
Men's 3m Springboard

- Piero Italiani

- Preliminary round – 573.69
- Final – 578.94 (→ 6th place)

== Fencing ==
20 fencers, 15 men and 5 women, represented Italy in 1984.

Men's foil

- Mauro Numa
- Stefano Cerioni
- Andrea Borella

Men's team foil

- Mauro Numa, Andrea Borella, Andrea Cipressa, Stefano Cerioni, Angelo Scuri

Men's épée

- Stefano Bellone
- Angelo Mazzoni
- Sandro Cuomo

Men's team épée

- Stefano Bellone, Sandro Cuomo, Cosimo Ferro, Roberto Manzi, Angelo Mazzoni

Men's sabre

- Marco Marin
- Giovanni Scalzo
- Gianfranco Dalla Barba

Men's team sabre

- Marco Marin, Gianfranco Dalla Barba, Giovanni Scalzo, Ferdinando Meglio, Angelo Arcidiacono

Women's foil

- Dorina Vaccaroni
- Carola Cicconetti
- Margherita Zalaffi

Women's team foil

- Dorina Vaccaroni, Clara Mochi, Margherita Zalaffi, Lucia Traversa, Carola Cicconetti

== Football ==
Men's team competition

- Preliminary round (group D)

- Italy – Egypt 1-0
- Italy – United States 1-0
- Italy – Costa Rica 0-1

- Quarterfinals

- Italy – Chile 1-0 (after extra time)

- Semifinals

- Italy – Brazil 1-2 (after extra time)

- Bronze-medal match

- Italy – Yugoslavia 1-2

- Team roster

- ( 1.) Franco Tancredi (gk)
- ( 2.) Riccardo Ferri
- ( 3.) Filippo Galli
- ( 4.) Sebastiano Nela
- ( 5.) Roberto Tricella
- ( 6.) Pietro Vierchowod
- ( 7.) Salvatore Bagni
- ( 8.) Franco Baresi
- ( 9.) Sergio Battistini
- (10.) Antonio Sabato
- (11.) Beniamo Vignola
- (12.) Walter Zenga (gk)
- (13.) Pietro Fanna
- (14.) Daniele Massaro
- (15.) Massimo Briaschi
- (16.) Maurizio Iorio
- (17.) Aldo Serena

- Head Coach: Enzo Bearzot

== Modern pentathlon ==
Three male pentathletes represented Italy in 1984. Carlo Massullo won an individual bronze, Daniele Masala won an individual gold and the team also won gold.

Individual competition:

- Daniele Masala - 5469 points (gold medal)
- Carlo Massullo - 5406 points (bronze medal)
- Pier Paolo Cristofori - 5185 points (11th place)

Team competition:

- Daniele Masala, Carlo Massullo, and Pier Paolo Cristofori - 16060 points (gold medal)

== Rowing ==
Ruggero Verroca and Francesco Esposito dominated the lightweight men's double scull during the early 1980s, and they won the World Rowing Championships from 1980 to 1983 every year. Lightweight men's double scull was not an Olympic boat class at the time, and they qualified in the open weight class of the men's double scull, where they reached the A final and came a respectable fifth. Later that same month, they won the 1984 World Rowing Championships, and continued to row in different boat classes thereafter.

== Swimming ==
Men's competition

Men's 100m freestyle

- Fabrizio Rampazzo

- Heat – 51.71
- B-Final – 51.56 (→ 12th place)

- Marco Colombo

- Heat – 52.34 (→ did not advance, 26th place)

Men's 200m freestyle

- Marco Dell'Uomo

- Heat – 1:51.67
- Final – 1:52.20 (→ 6th place)

- Paolo Revelli

- Heat – 1:53.46 (→ did not advance, 22nd place)

Men's 400m freestyle

- Marco Dell'Uomo

- Heat – 3:55.00
- Final – 3:55.44 (→ 7th place)

- Stefano Grandi

- Heat – 3:56.23
- B-Final – 3:57.17 (→ 12th place)

Men's 1500m freestyle

- Stefano Grandi

- Heat – 15:22.49
- Final – 15:28.58 (→ 6th place)

Men's 100m backstroke

- Paolo Falchini

- Heat – 58.65 (→ did not advance, 18th place)

- Fabrizio Bortolon

- Heat – 59.27 (→ did not advance, 24th place)

Men's 200m backstroke

- Paolo Falchini

- Heat – 2:04.59
- B-Final – 2:04.64 (→ 9th place)

- Fabrizio Bortolon

- Heat – 2:06.46
- B-Final – 2:05.86 (→ 15th place)

Men's 100m breaststroke

- Raffaele Avagnano

- Heat – 1:04.09
- Final – 1:04.11 (→ 8th place)

- Gianni Minervini

- Heat – 1:04.37
- B-Final – 1:03.99 (→ 9th place)

Men's 200m breaststroke

- Marco del Prete

- Heat – 2:18.90
- Final – DSQ (→ no ranking)

- Raffaele Avagnano

- Heat – 2:22.90 (→ did not advance, 18th place)

Men's 100m butterfly

- Fabrizio Rampazzo

- Heat – 55.70
- B-Final – DNS (→ no ranking)

Men's 200m butterfly

- Paolo Revelli

- Heat – 2:00.38
- B-Final – 2:01.58 (→ 14th place)

- Fabrizio Rampazzo

- Heat – DNS (→ did not advance, no ranking)

Men's 200m individual medley

- Giovanni Franceschi

- Heat – 2:06.76
- B-Final – 2:06.10 (→ 11th place)

- Maurizio Divano

- Heat – 2:07.19
- B-Final – 2:06.72 (→ 12th place)

Men's 400m individual medley

- Maurizio Divano

- Heat – 4:23.61
- Final – 4:22.76 (→ 5th place)

- Giovanni Franceschi

- Heat – 4:23.03
- Final – 4:26.05 (→ 8th place)

Men's 4 × 100 m freestyle relay

- Marcello Guarducci, Raffaele Francesch, Metello Savino, and Marco Colombo

- Heat – 3:25.37

- Marcello Guarducci, Marco Colombo, Metello Savino, and Fabrizio Rampazzo

- Final – 3:24.97 (→ 8th place)

Men's 4 × 200 m freestyle relay

- Marco Colombo, Marcello Guarducci, Fabrizio Rampazzo, and Marco Dell'Uomo

- Heat – DSQ (→ did not advance, no ranking)

Men's 4 × 100 m medley relay

- Paolo Falchini, Gianni Minervini, Fabrizio Rampazzo, and Marcello Guarducci

- Heat – DSQ (→ did not advance, no ranking)

Women's competition

- Silvia Persi, Grazia Colombo, Carla Lasi, Monica Olmi, Manuela Carosi, Carlotta Tagnin, Manuela Dalla Valle, Laura Belotti, Roberta Lanzarotti, Cristina Quintarelli, and Roberta Felotti

Women's 100m freestyle

- Silvia Persi

- Heat – 57.62
- B-Final – 57.24 (→ 10th place)

- Grazia Colombo

- Heat – 59.43 (→ did not advance, 24th place)

Women's 200m freestyle

- Silvia Persi

- Heat – 2:03.98
- B-Final – 2:03.17 (→ 9th place)

- Carla Lasi

- Heat – 2:04.60 (→ did not advance, 17th place)

Women's 400m freestyle

- Carla Lasi

- Heat – 4:18.90
- B-Final – 4:18.57 (→ 12th place)

- Monica Olmi

- Heat – 4:18.70
- B-Final – 4:19.22 (→ 13th place)

Women's 800m freestyle

- Carla Lasi

- Heat – 8:41.84
- Final – 8:42.45 (→ 5th place)

- Monica Olmi

- Heat – 8:45.83
- Final – 8:47.32 (→ 7th place)

Women's 4 × 100 m freestyle relay

- Monica Olmi, Silvia Persi, Grazia Colombo, and Manuela Dalla Valle

- Heat – 3:52.89 (→ did not advance)

Women's 4 × 100 m medley relay

- Manuela Carosi, Manuela Dalla Valle, Roberta Lanzarotti, and Silvia Persi

- Heat – 4:17.90
- Final – 4:17.40 (→ 5th place)

Women's 100m backstroke

- Manuela Carosi

- Heat – 1:04.77
- B-Final – 1:04.52 (→ 10th place)

Women's 200m backstroke

- Manuela Carosi

- Heat – 2:25.45 (→ did not advance, 23rd place)

Women's 200m butterfly

- Roberta Lanzarotti

- Heat – 2:14.53
- B-Final – 2:14.54 (→ 10th place)

- Monica Olmi

- Heat – 2:18.72
- B-Final – 2:16.47 (→ 13th place)

Women's 200m individual medley

- Manuela Dalla Valle

- Heat – 2:20.50
- Final – 2:19.69 (→ 6th place)

- Silvia Persi

- Heat – DSQ (→ did not advance, no ranking)

Women's 400m individual medley

- Roberta Felotti

- Heat – 4:54.14
- B-Final – 4:57.74 (→ 12th place)

== Volleyball ==
Men's team competition

- Preliminary round (group B)

- Defeated Canada (3-1)
- Defeated China (3-0)
- Lost to Japan (2-3)
- Defeated Egypt (3-0)

- Semifinals

- Lost to Brazil (1-3)

- Bronze-medal match

- Defeated Canada (3-0) → bronze medal

- Team roster

- Franco Bertoli
- Francesco Dall'Olio
- Giancarlo Dametto
- Guido de Luigi
- Giovanni Errichiello
- Giovanni Lanfranco
- Andrea Lucchetta
- Pier Paolo Lucchetta
- Marco Negri
- Piero Rebaudengo
- Amauri Ribeiro
- Paolo Vecchi
- Fabio Vullo

== Water polo ==
Men's team competition

- Preliminary round (group C)

- Defeated Japan (15-5)
- Drew with Australia (8-8)
- Lost to West Germany (4-10)

- Final round (group E)

- Defeated Brazil (13-4)
- Defeated China (11-8)
- Drew with Greece (8-8)
- Defeated Canada (16-9) → 7th place

- Team roster

- Roberto Gandolfi
- Alfio Misaggi
- Andrea Pisano
- Antonello Steardo
- Mario Fiorillo
- Gianni de Magistris
- Marco Galli
- Marco d'Altrui
- Marco Baldineti
- Vincenzo d'Angelo
- Romeo Collina
- Stefano Postiglione
- Umberto Panerai
