= Boxing at the 1984 Summer Olympics – Bantamweight =

Olympic boxing tournament

Bantamweight boxing at the Games of the XXIII Olympiad
- Venue: Los Angeles Memorial Sports Arena
- Dates: 30 July – 11 August 1984
- Competitors: 35 from 35 nations

Medalists
1st place, gold medalist(s)		Maurizio Stecca	Italy
2nd place, silver medalist(s)		Héctor López	Mexico
3rd place, bronze medalist(s)		Dale Walters	Canada
3rd place, bronze medalist(s)		Pedro Nolasco	Dominican Republic

The men's bantamweight event was part of the boxing programme at the 1984 Summer Olympics. The weight class allowed boxers of up to 54 kilograms to compete. The competition was held from 30 July to 11 August 1984. 35 boxers from 35 nations competed.

== Medalists ==
Gold	Maurizio Stecca; Italy
Silver	Héctor López; Mexico
Bronze	Dale Walters; Canada
Bronze	Pedro Nolasco; Dominican Republic

== Results ==
The following boxers took part in the event:

Rank	Name	Country
1	Maurizio Stecca	Italy
2	Héctor López	Mexico
3T	Dale Walters	Canada
3T	Pedro Nolasco	Dominican Republic
5T	Pedro Décima	Argentina
5T	Ndaba Dube	Zimbabwe
5T	Robinson Pitalúa	Colombia
5T	Mun Seong-gil	South Korea
9T	Cemal Öner	Turkey
9T	Hiroaki Takami	Japan
9T	Joe Orewa	Nigeria
9T	Louis Gomis	France
9T	Babar Ali Khan	Pakistan
9T	Star Zulu	Zambia
9T	Robert Shannon	United States
9T	John John Molina	Puerto Rico
17T	Tshoza Mukuta	Zaire
17T	Bararq Bahtobe	Ivory Coast
17T	Gamal El-Din El-Koumy	Egypt
17T	Mustapha Kouchene	Algeria
17T	Wanchai Pongsri	Thailand
17T	Johny Asadoma	Indonesia
17T	Amon Neequaye	Ghana
17T	Stefan Gertel	West Germany
17T	Hugh Dyer	Belize
17T	Firmin Abissi	Benin
17T	Gustavo Cruz	Nicaragua
17T	Philip Sutcliffe Snr	Ireland
17T	John Hyland	Great Britain
17T	Sammy Mwangi	Kenya
17T	Jarmo Eskelinen	Finland
17T	John Siryakibbe	Uganda
33T	Yao Gaitor	Togo
33T	Ljubiša Simić	Yugoslavia
33T	Manuel Vilchez	Venezuela

=== First round ===
- Jarmo Eskelinen (FIN) def. Yao Gaitor (TOG), 5:0
- Pedro Nolasco (DOM) def. Ljubiša Simič (YUG), 4:1
- John Siryakibbe (UGA) def. Manuel Vilchez (VEN), 3:2

=== Second round ===
- Pedro Ruben Decima (ARG) def. Tshoza Mukuta (ZAI), 5:0
- Çemal Öner (TUR) def. Bararg Bahtohe (IVC), 4:1
- Hiroaki Takami (JPN) def. Gamal El-Komy (EGY), 4:1
- Dale Walters (CAN) def. Mustapha Kouchene (ALG), 5:0
- Joe Orewa (NGR) def. Wanchai Pongsri (THA), KO-2
- Héctor López (MEX) def. Johny Asadoma (INA), KO-3
- Ndaba Dube (ZIM) def. Amon Neequaye (GHA), 5:0
- Louis Gomis (FRA) def. Stefan Gertel (FRG), AB-2
- Robinson Pitalua (COL) def. Hugh Dyer (BLZ), RSC-2
- Babar Ali Khan (PAK) def. Firmin Abissi (BEN), 5:0
- Star Zulu (ZAM) def. Gustavo Cruz (NIC), 5:0
- Maurizio Stecca (ITA) def. Philip Sutcliffe Snr (IRL), 5:0
- Moon Sung-Kil (KOR) def. John Hyland (GBR), AB-3
- Robert Shannon (USA) def. Sammy Mwangi (KEN), 5:0
- Juan Molina (PUR) def. Jarmo Eskelinen (FIN), 5:0
- Pedro Nolasco (DOM) def. John Siryakibbe (UGA), 5:0

=== Third round ===
- Pedro Ruben Decima (ARG) def. Çemal Öner (TUR), 4:1
- Dale Walters (CAN) def. Hiroaki Takami (JPN), 5:0
- Héctor López (MEX) def. Joe Orewa (NGR), 4:1
- Ndaba Dube (ZIM) def. Louis Gomis (FRA), 5:0
- Robinson Pitalua (COL) def. Babar Ali Khan (PAK), 5:0
- Maurizio Stecca (ITA) def. Star Zulu (ZAM), 5:0
- Moon Sung-Kil (KOR) def. Robert Shannon (USA), RSC-3
- Pedro Nolasco (DOM) def. Juan Molina (PUR), 3:2

=== Quarterfinals ===
- Dale Walters (CAN) def. Pedro Ruben Decima (ARG), 5:0
- Héctor López (MEX) def. Ndaba Dube (ZIM), 5:0
- Maurizio Stecca (ITA) def. Robinson Pitalua (COL), 5:0
- Pedro Nolasco (DOM) def. Moon Sung-Kil (KOR), RSC-1

=== Semifinals ===
- Héctor López (MEX) def. Dale Walters (CAN), 5:0
- Maurizio Stecca (ITA) def. Pedro Nolasco (DOM), 5:0

=== Final ===
- Maurizio Stecca (ITA) def. Héctor López (MEX), 4:1
