= Pakistan at the 1984 Summer Olympics =

- IOC code: PAK
- NOC: National Olympic Committee of Pakistan
- Website: www.nocpakistan.org

in Los Angeles
- Competitors: 29
- Flag bearer: Manzoor Hussain
- Medals Ranked 25th: Gold 1 Silver 0 Bronze 0 Total 1

Summer Olympics appearances (overview)
- 1948; 1952; 1956; 1960; 1964; 1968; 1972; 1976; 1980; 1984; 1988; 1992; 1996; 2000; 2004; 2008; 2012; 2016; 2020; 2024

Pakistan competed at the 1984 Summer Olympics in Los Angeles, United States. The nation returned to the Games after participating in the American-led boycott of the 1980 Summer Olympics. Pakistan won the gold medal in the men's hockey team competition, its last gold medal until the 2024 Paris Olympics.

== Competitors ==
Sport	Men	Women	Total
Athletics	3	0	3
Boxing	4	0	4
Field hockey	16	0	16
Sailing	6	0	6
Wrestling	2	0	2
Total	31	0	31

== Medalists ==
Medal	Name	Sport	Event	Date
Gold	Pakistan men's Ghulam Moinuddin; Qasim Zia; Nasir Ali; Abdul Rashid Al-Hasan; Ayaz Mahmood; Naeem Akhtar; Kaleemullah Khan; Manzoor Junior; Hassan Sardar; Hanif Khan; Khalid Hamid; Shahid Ali Khan; Tauqeer Dar; Ishtiaq Ahmed; Saleem Sherwani; Mushtaq Ahmad	Field hockey	Men's tournament	11 August

Medals by sport
Sport	Gold	Silver	Bronze	Total
Field Hockey	1	0	0	1
Total	1	0	0	1

== Results by event ==
Pakistan at the 1984 Summer Olympics

Location: Los Angeles, United States

Date: July 28 – August 12, 1984

Number of Competitors: 27

Sports: 6

Pakistan participated in the 1984 Summer Olympics with a contingent of 27 athletes competing in 6 sports. Their most notable achievement was winning the gold medal in the men's field hockey event. This victory was a significant moment in the nation's sports history, marking their third Olympic gold medal in field hockey.

Field hockey The men's field hockey tournament was the highlight of Pakistan's participation in the 1984 Olympics. The team performed exceptionally well throughout the tournament, ultimately winning the gold medal.

Detailed Results by Sport

Here is a list of all Pakistani athletes who participated in the 1984 Olympics, excluding the field hockey team: Muhammad Younus (Athletics, Men's 200m) Ghulam Raziq (Athletics, Men's 110m Hurdles) Arif Hussain (Athletics, Men's 400m) Syed Ibrar Ali (Boxing, Men's Flyweight 51 kg) Usman Ullah Khan (Boxing, Men's Bantamweight 54 kg) Abdul Rashid Qambrani (Boxing, Men's Featherweight 57 kg) Shams ul Hassan (Boxing, Men's Lightweight 60 kg)Hussain Shah (Boxing, Men's Welterweight 67 kg) Khurram Inam (Shooting, Men's Skeet) Mohammad Ismail (Sailing, Men's Finn Class) Muhammad Akhtar (Wrestling, Men's 74 kg Freestyle)

== Athletics ==
Key

- Note–Ranks given for track events are within the athlete's heat only
- Q = Qualified for the next round
- q = Qualified for the next round as a fastest loser or, in field events, by position without achieving the qualifying target
- NR = National record
- N/A = Round not applicable for the event
- Bye = Athlete not required to compete in round

Men
Track & road events

Athlete	Event	Heat		Quarterfinal		Semifinal		Final	
Athlete	Event	Result	Rank	Result	Rank	Result	Rank	Result	Rank
Muhammad Mansha	100 m	10.87	7	Did not advance					
Muhammad Mansha	200 m	22.04	6	Did not advance					
Meesaq Rizvi	400 m	49.58	7	Did not advance					
Meesaq Rizvi	800 m	1:51.29	44	Did not advance					
Muhammad Rashid Khan	Javelin throw	74.58m	9	N/A				Did not advance	

== Boxing ==
Athlete	Event	Round of 32	Round of 16	Quarterfinals	Semifinals	Final	
Athlete	Event	Opposition Result	Opposition Result	Opposition Result	Opposition Result	Opposition Result	Rank
Babar Ali Khan	Bantamweight	Firmin Abissi (BEN); W 5–0	Robinsón Pitalúa (COL); L 0–5	Did not advance			
Asif Kamran Dar	Lightweight	Shlomo Niazov (ISR); W 5–0	Leopoldo Cantancio (PHI); L 0–5	Did not advance			
Abrar Hussain	Welterweight	bye	Vesa Koskela (SWE); L 1–4	Did not advance			
Muhammad Youssef	Welterweight	Lennox Lewis (CAN); L RSC	Did not advance				

== Hockey ==
Summary

Key:

- FT – After full-time.
- P – Match decided by penalty-shootout.

Team	Event	Group stage						Semifinal	Final / BM	
Team	Event	Opposition Score	Opposition Score	Opposition Score	Opposition Score	Opposition Score	Rank	Opposition Score	Opposition Score	Rank
Pakistan men's	Men's tournament	New Zealand; D 3–3	Kenya; W 3–0	Netherlands; D 3–3	Canada; W 7–1	Great Britain; D 0–0	2	Australia; W 1–0	West Germany; W 2–1 (A.E.T	1st place, gold medalist(s)

Team roster

Manager/Coach Birg M.H.Atif Head coach: Khwaja Zakauddin

Pos.	Player	DoB	Age	Tournament games	Tournament goals
	Ghulam Moinuddin	February 17, 1958	26	5	0
	Qasim Zia	August 7, 1961	22	6	0
	Nasir Ali	January 1, 1959	25	7	0
	Abdul Rashid Al-Hasan	April 14, 1959	25	7	0
	Ayaz Mahmood	May 24, 1964	20	7	0
	Naeem Akhtar	June 8, 1961	23	5	0
	Kaleemullah Khan	January 2, 1958	26	6	1
	Manzoor Junior	October 28, 1958	25	7	5
	Hassan Sardar	October 22, 1957	26	7	10
	Hanif Khan	July 5, 1959	25	7	2
	Khalid Hamid	February 3, 1961	23	7	1
	Shahid Ali Khan	December 16, 1964	19	4	0
	Tauqeer Dar	January 31, 1964	20	3	0
	Ishtiaq Ahmed	December 20, 1962	21	5	0
FW	Saleem Sherwani (Note: Not to be confused with Saleem Sherwani (goalkeeper) who played at 1972 Summer Olympics and 1976 Summer Olympics.)	February 3, 1961	23	2	1
	Mushtaq Ahmad	February 15, 1945	28	4	0

=== Group stage ===
Pos	Team	Pld	W	D	L	GF	GA	GD	Pts	Qualification
1	Great Britain	5	4	1	0	10	5	+5	9	Semi-finals
2	Pakistan	5	2	3	0	16	7	+9	7	Semi-finals
3	Netherlands	5	3	1	1	16	9	+7	7	5–8th place semi-finals
4	New Zealand	5	1	2	2	10	10	0	4	5–8th place semi-finals
5	Kenya	5	1	0	4	5	14	−9	2	9–12th place semi-finals
6	Canada	5	0	1	4	7	19	−12	1	9–12th place semi-finals

Source: FIH

30 July 1984
15:30

New Zealand	3–3	Pakistan
Daji 5', 68', 70+'	Report	Sardar 15', 46', 51'

Umpires:
Santiago Deo (ESP)
Richard Kentwell (USA)

1 August 1984
13:45

Kenya	0–3	Pakistan
	Report	H. Khan 16'; Hussain 30'; Sardar 32'

Umpires:
Louismichel Gillet (FRA)
Richard Kentwell (USA)

3 August 1984
15:30

Netherlands	3–3	Pakistan
T. Kruize 18'; Van 't Hek 29'; J. Kruize 61'	Report	Hameed 35+'; Sardar 48'; Manzoor 64'

Umpires:
Horacio Servetto (ARG)
Louismichel Gillet (FRA)

5 August 1984
15:30

Canada	1–7	Pakistan
Sandhu 46'	Report	Sardar 1', 34', 49'; Hussain 13', 14', 51'; H. Khan 22'

Umpires:
Horacio Servetto (ARG)
Santiago Deo (ESP)

7 August 1984
08:00

Great Britain	0–0	Pakistan
	Report

Umpires:
Santiago Deo (ESP)
J Perera (SRI)

=== Semi-finals ===
9 August 1984
15:00

Australia	0–1	Pakistan
	Report	Sardar 22'

Umpires:
Horacio Servetto (ARG)
Louismichel Gillet (FRA)

=== Gold medal match ===
11 August 1984
13:15

West Germany	1–2 (a.e.t.)	Pakistan
Peter 44'	Report	Sardar 50'; K. Khan 82'

Umpires:
Horacio Servetto (ARG)
Santiago Deo (ESP)

== Wrestling ==
At the end of the match, all wrestlers were given "bad points", according to the results of their bouts. The loser received 3 points if the loss was by fall or unanimous decision and 2 points if the decision was 2–1. The winner received 1 point if the win was by decision and 0 points if the win was by fall. At the end of each round, any wrestler with at least 5 points was eliminated.

Key:

- VFA – Victory by fall.
- VIN – Victory by injury (VF for forfeit, VA for withdrawal or disqualification)
- VPO – Decision by points.

Athlete	Event	Round 1		Round 2		Round 3		Round 4		Total	
Athlete	Event	Opposition Result	Points	Opposition Result	Points	Opposition Result	Points	Opposition Result	Points	Points	Rank
Muhammad Gul	Freestyle 74 kg	Ali Hussain Faris (IRQ); L^{VFA}	1	bye		Han Myung-Woo (KOR); L ^{VFA}	2	did not advance			
Abdul Majeed Maruwala	Freestyle 90 kg	Edwin Lins (AUT); W^{VPO}	0	İsmail Temiz (TUR); L ^{VPO}	1	Ed Banach (USA); L ^{VFA}	2	did not advance			7

== Sailing ==
Athlete	Event	Crew	Race							Total	
Athlete	Event	Crew	1	2	3	4	5	6	7	Net points	Rank
Khalid Akhtar	Soling	Adnan Yousoof; Naseem Khan	18	21	18	~~19~~	18	18	18	172.0	20
Arshad Choudhry	Finn	n/a	22	24	~~23~~	21	23	22	21	198.0	24
Munir Sadid	470 Class	Mohammad Zakaullah	20	21	20	21	9	20	~~DNF~~	182.0	22
