= Swimming at the 1979 Mediterranean Games =

- Location: Split, Yugoslavia

The swimming competition at the 1979 Mediterranean Games was held in Split, Yugoslavia.

== Medallists ==
=== Men's events ===
Games	Gold		Silver		Bronze	
100 m freestyle	Marcello Guarducci; Italy	51.58	David López-Zubero; Spain	51.77	René Écuyer; France	51.93
200 m freestyle	David López-Zubero; Spain	1:53.58	Borut Petrič; Yugoslavia	1:53.76	Marcello Guarducci; Italy	1:53.81
400 m freestyle	Borut Petrič; Yugoslavia	3:58.86	Giorgio Quadri; Italy	4:01.00	Paolo Revelli; Italy	4:03.08
1500 m freestyle	Borut Petrič; Yugoslavia	15:50.47	Giovanni Nagni; Italy	15:51.72	Rafael Escalas; Spain	15:51.74
100 m backstroke	Frédéric Delcourt; France	59.93	Stefano Bellon; Italy	1:00.10	Daniele Cerabino; Italy	1:00.28
200 m backstroke	Stefano Bellon; Italy	2:06.98	Frédéric Delcourt; France	2:07.35	Daniele Cerabino; Italy	2:08.83
100 m breaststroke	Olivier Borios; France	1:07.23	Davide Peloso; Italy	1:07.41	Sandro Vettore; Italy	1:07.67
200 m breaststroke	Cezare Fabbri; Italy	2:25.53	Olivier Borios; France	2:27.08	Massimo Trevisan; Italy	2:29.24
100 m butterfly	David López-Zubero; Spain	56.38	Fabrizio Rampazzo; Italy	56.82	Xavier Savin; France	57.04
200 m butterfly	Fabio Bracaglia; Italy	2:04.48	Borut Petrič; Yugoslavia	2:04.75	Massimo Armellini; Italy	2:04.95
400 m medley	Borut Petrič; Yugoslavia	4:35.50	Giovanni Franceschi; Italy	4:40.98	Maurizio Divano; Italy	4:41.36
4 × 200 m freestyle relay	Italy; Paolo Revelli; Giorgio Quadri; Fabrizio Rampazzo; Marcello Guarducci	7:36.70	France	7:41.51	Spain	7:52.96
4 × 100 m medley relay	Italy; Stefano Bellon; Davide Peloso; Fabrizio Rampazzo; Marcello Guarducci	3:53.18	France	3:55.19	Spain	3:57.57

=== Women's events ===
Games	Gold		Silver		Bronze	
100 m freestyle	Natalia Más; Spain	59.28	Manuela Dalla Valle; Italy	59.88	Cristina Ponteprimo; Italy	1:00.17
200 m freestyle	Natalia Más; Spain	2:04.32	Roberta Felotti; Italy	2:04.96	Anne Vial; France	2:06.57
400 m freestyle	Roberta Felotti; Italy	4:18.94	Natalia Más; Spain	4:22.25	Fulvia Cornella; Italy	4:27.70
800 m freestyle	Roberta Felotti; Italy	8:51.01	Sofia Dara; Greece	9:00.61	Giuditta Pandini; Italy	9:01.01
100 m backstroke	Michèle Ricaud; France	1:05.82	Manuela Carosi; Italy	1:06.30	Laura Foralosso; Italy	1:06.82
200 m backstroke	Michèle Ricaud; France	2:19.80	Daniela Ferrini; Italy	2:24.31	Manuela Carosi; Italy	2:24.99
100 m breaststroke	Carlotta Tagnin; Italy	1:13.85	Sabrina Seminatore; Italy	1:14.54	Annick de Susini; France	1:15.19
200 m breaststroke	Annick de Susini; France	2:40.95	Carlotta Tagnin; Italy	2:41.56	Catherine Poirot; France	2:41.84
100 m butterfly	Cinzia Savi Scarponi; Italy	1:02.96	Sophie Falandry; France	1:04.92	Cristina Quintarelli; Italy	1:06.29
200 m butterfly	Cinzia Savi Scarponi; Italy	2:16.96	Sophie Falandry; France	2:19.20	Cinzia Rampazzo; Italy	2:19.34
400 m medley	Cinzia Savi Scarponi; Italy	5:02.45	Véronique Plat; France	5:07.70	Vesna Šeparović; Yugoslavia	5:11.94
4 × 100 m freestyle relay	Italy; Cinzia Savi Scarponi; Cristina Ponteprimo; Roberta Felotti; Manuela Dalla Valle	3:58.89	France	4:00.57	Spain	4:00.60
4 × 100 m medley relay	Italy; Manuela Carosi; Carlotta Tagnin; Cinzia Savi Scarponi; Manuela Dalla Valle	4:24.19	France	4:24.91	Spain	4:34.02

== Medal table ==
* Host nation (Yugoslavia)

Rank	Nation	Gold	Silver	Bronze	Total
1	Italy	14	12	15	41
2	France	5	9	5	19
3	Spain	4	2	5	11
4	Yugoslavia*	3	2	1	6
5	Greece	0	1	0	1
Totals (5 entries)		26	26	26	78
