= Swimming at the 1983 Mediterranean Games =

- Location: Casablanca, Morocco

The swimming competition at the 1983 Mediterranean Games was held in Casablanca, Morocco.

== Medallists ==
=== Men's events ===
Games	Gold		Silver		Bronze	
100 m freestyle	Marcello Guarducci; Italy	51.71	Laurent Neuville; France	52.48	Kemal Sadri Özün; Turkey	53.48
200 m freestyle	Borut Petrič; Yugoslavia	1:52.98	Juan Carlos Vallejo; Spain	1:53.06	Darjan Petrič; Yugoslavia	1:53.26
400 m freestyle	Darjan Petrič; Yugoslavia	3:54.72	Marco Dell'Uomo; Italy	3:56.92	Borut Petrič; Yugoslavia	3:57.66
1500 m freestyle	Rafael Escalas; Spain	15:18.89	Darjan Petrič; Yugoslavia	15:28.75	Juan Enrique Escalas; Spain	15:34.16
100 m backstroke	Claude Jambet; France	58.88	Shérif Nour; Egypt	58.95	Fabrizio Bortolon; Italy	59.77
200 m backstroke	Paolo Falchini; Italy	2:06.06	Claude Jambet; France	2:08.34	Ilias Malamas; Greece	2:09.70
100 m breaststroke	Raffaele Avagnano; Italy	1:05.44	Gustavo Torrijos; Spain	1:05.47	Piero Tenderini; Italy	1:05.52
200 m breaststroke	Enrique Romero; Spain	2:22.07	Raffaele Avagnano; Italy	2:24.71	Cesare Fabbri; Italy	2:24.94
100 m butterfly	David López-Zubero; Spain	55.21	Marco Tornatore; Italy	56.50	İhsan Sabri Özün; Turkey	56.71
200 m butterfly	Harri Garmendia; Spain	2:03.09	Marco Tornatore; Italy	2:03.22	Giulio Sartorio; Italy	2:03.41
200 m medley	David López-Zubero; Spain	2:06.67	Maurizio Divano; Italy	2:07.30	Borut Petrič; Yugoslavia	2:08.01
400 m medley	Giovanni Franceschi; Italy	4:27.30	Maurizio Divano; Italy	4:28.14	Rafael Escalas; Spain	4:28.31
4 × 100 m freestyle relay	Italy	3:26.53	France	3:28.80	Spain	3:30.76
4 × 200 m freestyle relay	Italy	7:34.48	Spain	7:35.46	France	7:36.96
4 × 100 m medley relay	Italy	3:50.44	Spain	3:52.76	France	3:53.81

=== Women's events ===
Games	Gold		Silver		Bronze	
100 m freestyle	Sophie Kamoun; France	58.00	Véronique Jardin; France	58.53	Sofia Dara; Greece	58.63
200 m freestyle	Laurence Bensimon; France	2:04.86	Sophie Kamoun; France	2:05.07	Sofia Dara; Greece	2:05.63
400 m freestyle	Sofia Dara; Greece	4:18.61	Carla Lasi; Italy	4:19.61	Laurence Bensimon; France	4:21.49
800 m freestyle	Carla Lasi; Italy	8:47.94	Monica Olmi; Italy	8:50.71	Sofia Dara; Greece	8:53.83
100 m backstroke	Manuela Carosi; Italy	1:04.96	Véronique Jardin; France	1:05.43	Ilaria Tocchini; Italy	1:07.05
200 m backstroke	Manuela Carosi; Italy	2:19.20	Véronique Jardin; France	2:20.29	Martina Giuliani; Italy	2:21.50
100 m breaststroke	Sabrina Seminatore; Italy	1:12.35	Catherine Poirot; France	1:12.99	Manuela Dalla Valle; Italy	1:13.68
200 m breaststroke	Alessandra Zambruno; Italy	2:38.21	Simona Brighetti; Italy	2:38.50	Paraskevi Protopapa; Greece	2:40.03
100 m butterfly	Cinzia Savi Scarponi; Italy	1:02.79	Ilaria Tocchini; Italy	1:03.60	Sophie Falandry; France	1:04.16
200 m butterfly	Cinzia Savi Scarponi; Italy	2:17.97	Rosanna La Torre; France	2:19.50	Natalia Autric; Spain	2:21.18
200 m medley	Cinzia Savi Scarponi; Italy	2:18.80	Paraskevi Protopapa; Greece	2:20.54	Manuela Dalla Valle; Italy	2:22.97
400 m medley	Roberta Felotti; Italy	4:54.72	Laurence Bensimon; France	4:55.96	Paraskevi Protopapa; Greece	4:56.86
4 × 100 m freestyle relay	France	3:53.64	Spain	4:02.28	Yugoslavia	4:09.92
4 × 100 m medley relay	Italy	4:17.99	France	4:19.79	Spain	4:29.69

== Medal table ==
Rank	Nation	Gold	Silver	Bronze	Total
1	Italy	17	10	8	35
2	Spain	5	5	5	15
3	France	4	11	4	19
4	Yugoslavia	2	1	4	7
5	Greece	1	1	6	8
6	Egypt	0	1	0	1
7	Turkey	0	0	2	2
Totals (7 entries)		29	29	29	87
