= Lanzerotti =

Lanzerotti may refer to:

- Louis J. Lanzerotti (born 1938), American physicist
- Mount Lanzerotti, mountain in Palmer Land, Antarctica
- 5504 Lanzerotti, minor planet

== See also ==
- Lanzarote
- Lanzarotti
