= Pandini =

Pandini is an Italian surname. Notable people with the surname include:

- Giuditta Pandini (born 1960), Italian swimmer
- Marta Pandini (born 1998), Italian footballer
- Robert Pandini (born 1961), Canadian make-up artist
