= Pedro Rubén Décima =

Argentine boxer

Personal information
- Born: March 10, 1964 (age 62) Burruyacú, Tucumán, Argentina
- Height: 5 ft 4 in (163 cm)
- Weight: Super bantamweight

Boxing career
- Reach: 66 in (168 cm)
- Stance: Orthodox

Boxing record
- Total fights: 36
- Wins: 31
- Win by KO: 21
- Losses: 4
- No contests: 1

Pedro Rubén Décima (born March 10, 1964) is an Argentine former professional boxer.

== Amateur career ==
As an amateur Decima represented Argentina as a bantamweight at the 1984 Olympic Games. His results were:

- 1st round bye
- Defeated Tshoza Mukuta (Zaire) 5-0
- Defeated Çemal Öner (Turkey) 4-1
- Lost to Dale Walters (Canada) 0-5

== Professional career ==
Decima turned pro in 1984 and captured the WBC super bantamweight title with an upset TKO win over Paul Banke in 1990, a fight in which Banke was knocked down three times in the 4th round. He lost the belt in his first defense to Kiyoshi Hatanaka in 1991. He would go on to suffer another defeat a year later against contender Rudy Zavala, and would end up retiring in 1993.

At his age, he works as a public boxer trainer in Buenos Aires, Argentina.

== Professional boxing record ==
36 fights	31 wins	4 losses
By knockout	21	3
By decision	9	1
By disqualification	1	0
No contests	1	

No.	Result	Record	Opponent	Type	Round, time	Date	Location	Notes
36	Win	31–4 (1)	Almir Fernandes de Oliveira	TKO	5 (10)	1993-10-23	Buenos Aires, Argentina	
35	Win	30–4 (1)	Luis Alberto Vargas	PTS	8 (8)	1993-07-10	Club Defensores de Villa Lujan, Tucumán, Argentina	
34	NC	29–4 (1)	Sergio Atilio Martinez	NC	3 (10)	1993-04-10	Estadio Super Domo, Mar del Plata, Argentina	
33	Loss	29–4	Rudy Zavala	TKO	6 (10)	1992-06-19	Caesars Palace, Paradise, Nevada, U.S.	
32	Win	29–3	Roberto Schonning	TKO	4 (10)	1992-05-23	Estadio F.A.B., Buenos Aires, Argentina	
31	Win	28–3	Cirilo Ramon Figueredo	DQ	4 (10)	1992-01-31	Lanús, Argentina	
30	Win	27–3	Hugo Escudero	KO	3 (8)	1991-12-21	Buenos Aires, Argentina	
29	Loss	26–3	Kiyoshi Hatanaka	TKO	8 (12)	1991-02-03	Rainbow Hall, Nagoya, Japan	Lost WBC super-bantamweight title
28	Win	26–2	Paul Banke	TKO	4 (12)	1990-11-05	Great Western Forum, Inglewood, California, U.S.	Won WBC super-bantamweight title
27	Win	25–2	Pedro Villegas	MD	10 (10)	1990-05-18	Buenos Aires, Argentina	
26	Win	24–2	Hugo Roberto Villarruel	KO	6 (10)	1990-01-19	Mar del Plata, Argentina	
25	Win	23–2	Joe Orewa	UD	10 (10)	1989-07-14	Riviera Theatre, Chicago, Illinois, U.S.	
24	Win	22–2	Tony Pruitt	TKO	1 (10)	1989-03-10	Jai Alai Fronton, Miami, Florida, U.S.	
23	Win	21–2	Julian Solís	UD	10 (10)	1989-01-17	Caesars Palace, Paradise, Nevada, U.S.	
22	Win	20–2	Robert Shannon	RTD	4 (10)	1988-12-09	Caesars Palace, Paradise, Nevada, U.S.	
21	Loss	19–2	Louie Espinoza	TKO	8 (10)	1988-09-16	Caesars Palace, Paradise, Nevada, U.S.	
20	Win	19–1	Jesse Benavides	TKO	3 (10)	28 Jul 1988	Caesars Palace, Paradise, Nevada, U.S.	
19	Win	18–1	Allan Makitoki	KO	2 (10)	1988-05-27	Caesars Palace, Paradise, Nevada, U.S.	
18	Win	17–1	Carlos Alberto Laciar	RTD	8 (12)	1987-10-03	Buenos Aires, Argentina	Retained Argentine super-bantamweight title
17	Win	16–1	Raúl Gómez	PTS	10 (10)	1987-08-15	Estadio F.A.B., Buenos Aires, Argentina	
16	Win	15–1	Ramón Antonio Domínguez	TKO	3 (12)	1987-01-16	Mar del Plata, Argentina	Won Argentine super-bantamweight title
15	Loss	14–1	Ramón Balbino Soria	UD	10 (10)	1986-11-14	Mar del Plata, Argentina	
14	Win	14–0	Raul Gomez	PTS	10 (10)	1986-09-19	Mar del Plata, Argentina	
13	Win	13–0	Ramon Balbino Soria	KO	2 (10)	1986-07-19	Mar del Plata, Argentina	
12	Win	12–0	Antonio Pascual Ibanez	PTS	10 (10)	1986-02-14	Mar del Plata, Argentina	
11	Win	11–0	Julio Roberto Ramirez	KO	7 (10)	1985-12-13	Mar del Plata, Argentina	
10	Win	10–0	Jose Antonio Gomez	KO	3 (10)	1985-11-15	Mar del Plata, Argentina	
9	Win	9–0	Raul Gomez	KO	10 (10)	1985-10-04	Mar del Plata, Argentina	
8	Win	8–0	Miguel Angel Francia	KO	3 (10)	1985-09-18	Estadio Luna Park, Buenos Aires, Argentina	
7	Win	7–0	Cesar Alfredo Villarruel	PTS	10 (10)	1985-08-23	Olavarría, Argentina	
6	Win	6–0	Daniel Ignacio Aguero	KO	2 (10)	1985-08-07	Buenos Aires, Argentina	
5	Win	5–0	Armando Eugenio Cancio	TKO	7 (10)	1985-06-07	San Miguel, Argentina	
4	Win	4–0	Ramon Alcides Maciel	TKO	2 (10)	1985-05-04	Estadio Luna Park, Buenos Aires, Argentina	
3	Win	3–0	Elbio Raul Ramirez	TKO	5 (6)	1985-04-06	Estadio Luna Park, Buenos Aires, Argentina	
2	Win	2–0	Gustavo Luis Villarruel	PTS	6 (6)	1985-03-01	Mar del Plata, Argentina	
1	Win	1–0	Diego Humberto Ferrero	TKO	4 (6)	1984-11-17	Estadio Luna Park, Buenos Aires, Argentina	

== See also ==
- List of world super-bantamweight boxing champions

Sporting positions
Regional boxing titles
Preceded by Ramon Antonio Dominguez	Argentine super-bantamweight champion January 16, 1987 – May, 1988; Vacated	Vacant Title next held by Sergio Oscar Arreguez
World boxing titles
Preceded by Paul Banke	WBC super-bantamweight champion November 5, 1990 – February 3, 1991	Succeeded by Kiyoshi Hatanaka
