= Gustavo Cruz =

Nicaraguan boxer

Personal information
- Nationality: Nicaraguan
- Born: 21 January 1966 (age 60)

Sport
- Sport: Boxing

Gustavo Cruz (born 21 January 1966) is a former Nicaraguan boxer. He competed in the men's bantamweight event at the 1984 Summer Olympics. At the 1984 Summer Olympics, he lost to Star Zulu of Zambia. Cruz also represented Nicaragua at the 1991 Pan American Games.
