= Tagnin =

Tagnin is an Italian surname. Notable people with the surname include:

- Carlo Tagnin (1932–2000), Italian footballer and manager
- Carlotta Tagnin (born 1965), Italian swimmer
