= Daniel Zaragoza =

Mexican boxer (born 1957)

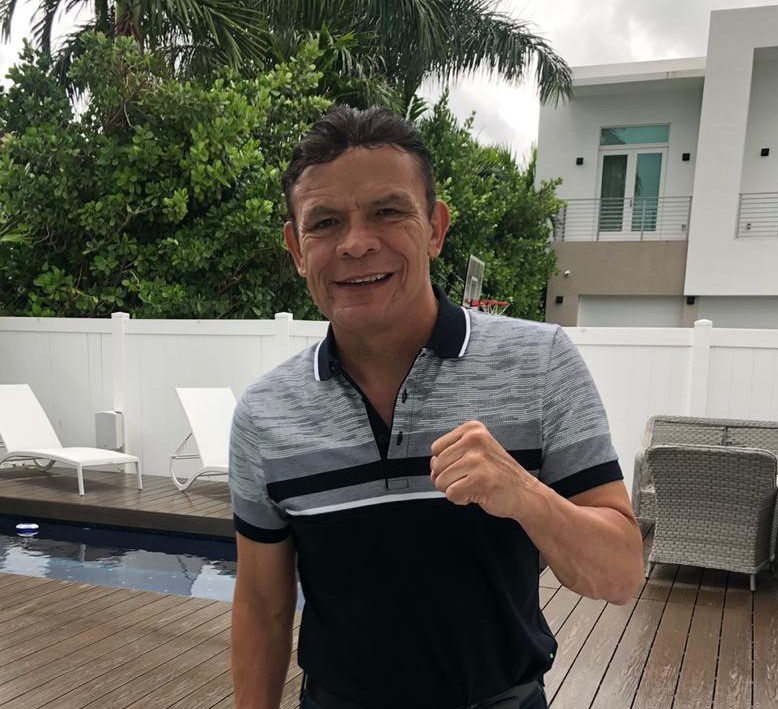

Personal information
- Nickname: El Ratón ("The Mouse")
- Born: 11 December 1957 (age 68) Mexico City, Mexico
- Height: 5 ft 7 in (170 cm)
- Weight: Bantamweight; Super bantamweight

Boxing career
- Reach: 68 in (173 cm)
- Stance: Southpaw

Boxing record
- Total fights: 66
- Wins: 55
- Win by KO: 28
- Losses: 8
- Draws: 3

Daniel Zaragoza (born December 11, 1957) is a Mexican former professional boxer who competed from 1980 to 1997. He is a world champion in two weight classes, having held the World Boxing Council (WBC) bantamweight title in 1985 and the WBC super bantamweight title twice between 1988 and 1997.

== Amateur career ==
- 1979 Represented Mexico as a bantamweight at the Pan-American Games in San Juan, Puerto Rico. Results were:
  - Defeated Alfonso Abata (Ecuador)
  - Lost to Jackie Beard (United States) points
- Represented Mexico as a bantamweight at the 1980 Moscow Olympic Games. Results were:
  - Defeated Philip Sutcliffe Snr (Ireland) points
  - Defeated Ray Gilbody (Great Britain) points
  - Lost to Michael Anthony (Guyana) TKO by 2

== Professional career ==
In October 1980, Zaragoza won his pro debut against Ernesto Gutierrez.

=== WBC Bantamweight Championship ===
In 1985 he captured the vacant WBC Bantamweight title with a disqualification victory over Freddie Jackson in Aruba.

He lost his title in his first defense to Miguel "Happy" Lora. In his next bout in 1986, he suffered a non-title loss to IBF Bantamweight Champion and future International Boxing Hall of Fame member Jeff Fenech in Australia.

=== WBC Super Bantamweight Championship ===
Zaragoza moved up in weight in his next bout and scored 7 consecutive wins before capturing the vacant WBC Super Bantamweight title with a knockout win over future hall of fame member Carlos Zarate in 1988 in the tenth round of a fight scheduled for twelve rounds.

He successfully retained the title five times, including a hard-fought draw in South Korea against IBF Super Bantamweight champion Lee Seung-hoon, a knockout victory against future champion Valerio Nati in Italy, a decision victory over Paul Banke (16–3–0) in the first fight of their trilogy, a knockout victory against Frankie Duarte (47–7–1), and a decision victory over former champion Chan-Yong Park in South Korea. In 1990, he lost the belt to Paul Banke whom he had defeated just three fights prior.

Banke would go on to lose the title by knockout against Pedro Ruben Decima, who in turn was knocked out by Kiyoshi Hatanaka. In 1991, Zaragoza regained the belt with a split decision win over Hatanaka in Japan. He defended the belt against Chun Huh (25–2–0) of South Korea and avenged his loss to Paul Banke. In 1992, he lost his title to Thierry Jacob by decision in France. In his next two fights he battled newly crowned WBC super bantamweight titleholder Tracy Harris Patterson, who had recently defeated Jacob. He fought to a draw with Patterson in the first bout and lost by technical knockout in the second bout when the fight was stopped due to a cut despite the objections of Zaragoza.

==== Oldest Super Bantamweight Champion ====
In 1995 he would yet again get another crack at the title against WBC Super Bantamweight champion Hector Acero Sánchez, who had defeated Tracy Harris Patterson to win the title. The bout was controversially ruled a draw with most observers believing Zaragoza should have been declared the winner. He fought a rematch with Sánchez later in the year and won the belt via split decision. At 36 years 11 months, he became the oldest super bantamweight champion in history.

This began a late-career surge for Zaragoza who was able to defend the title four times, including two wins against former and future champion Joichiro Tatsuyoshi in Japan, a tko win over Tsuyoshi Harada (20–1–0) also in Japan, and an upset win against undefeated bantamweight champion Wayne McCullough who had recently moved up in weight. On Sep 6, 1997, he lost his title to then-undefeated 21-year-old Erik Morales, who knocked out Zaragoza in the 11th round. Zaragoza retired after the bout at the age of 39 with a record of 55–8–3.

== Retirement ==
He was inducted to the International Boxing Hall of Fame in 2004.

== Professional boxing record ==
66 fights	55 wins	8 losses
By knockout	28	3
By decision	25	5
By disqualification	2	0
Draws	3	

No.	Result	Record	Opponent	Type	Round	Date	Location	Notes
66	Loss	55–8–3	Érik Morales	KO	11 (12), 2:59	Sep 6, 1997	County Coliseum, El Paso, Texas, U.S.	Lost WBC super bantamweight title
65	Win	55–7–3	Joichiro Tatsuyoshi	UD	12	Apr 14, 1997	Prefectural Gymnasium, Osaka, Osaka, Japan	Retained WBC super bantamweight title
64	Win	54–7–3	Wayne McCullough	SD	12	Jan 11, 1997	Hynes Convention Center, Boston, Massachusetts, U.S.	Retained WBC super bantamweight title
63	Win	53–7–3	Tsuyoshi Harada	TKO	7 (12), 2:17	Jul 20, 1996	Prefectural Gymnasium, Osaka, Osaka, Japan	Retained WBC super bantamweight title
62	Win	52–7–3	Joichiro Tatsuyoshi	TKO	11 (12), 2:47	Mar 3, 1996	Arena, Yokohama, Kanagawa, Japan	Retained WBC super bantamweight title
61	Win	51–7–3	Hector Acero Sánchez	SD	12	Nov 6, 1995	Great Western Forum, Inglewood, California, U.S.	Won WBC super bantamweight title
60	Draw	50–7–3	Hector Acero Sánchez	MD	12	Jun 2, 1995	Foxwoods Resort, Mashantucket, Connecticut, U.S.	For WBC super bantamweight title
59	Win	50–7–2	José Sanabria	UD	10	Feb 11, 1995	Jai Alai Fronton, Miami, Florida, U.S.	
58	Win	49–7–2	Wilfredo Vargas	KO	7 (?)	Oct 22, 1994	Jai Alai Fronton, Miami, Florida, U.S.	
57	Win	48–7–2	Nino Ruiz	TKO	4 (?)	Aug 11, 1994	Mexico City, Distrito Federal, Mexico	
56	Win	47–7–2	Wilfredo Urbina	TKO	5 (?)	Jul 1, 1994	Navojoa, Sonora, Mexico	
55	Win	46–7–2	Juan Francisco Soto	UD	10	Jun 11, 1994	Great Western Forum, Inglewood, California, U.S.	
54	Win	45–7–2	Alejandro Batista	RTD	2 (10), 3:00	Dec 4, 1993	Jai Alai Fronton, Miami, Florida, U.S.	
53	Loss	44–7–2	Tracy Harris Patterson	TKO	7 (12), 2:07	Sep 25, 1993	Mid-Hudson Civic Center, Poughkeepsie, New York, U.S.	For WBC super bantamweight title
52	Draw	44–6–2	Tracy Harris Patterson	SD	12	Dec 5, 1992	Palais des Sports, Berck-sur-Mer, Pas-de-Calais, France	For WBC super bantamweight title
51	Loss	44–6–1	Thierry Jacob	UD	12	Mar 20, 1992	Chapiteau-Vieux Fort Niculay, Calais, Pas-de-Calais, France	Lost WBC super bantamweight title
50	Win	44–5–1	Paul Banke	UD	12	Dec 9, 1991	Great Western Forum, Inglewood, California, U.S.	Retained WBC super bantamweight title
49	Win	43–5–1	Joon Huh	UD	12	Aug 24, 1991	Daehan Life Insurance Bldg, Seoul, South Korea	Retained WBC super bantamweight title
48	Win	42–5–1	Kiyoshi Hatanaka	SD	12	Jun 14, 1991	Rainbow Hall, Nagoya, Aichi, Japan	Won WBC super bantamweight title
47	Win	41–5–1	Moi Hernandez	PTS	10	Apr 5, 1991	Piedras Negras, Coahuila de Zaragoza, Mexico	
46	Loss	40–5–1	Paul Banke	TKO	9 (12), 2:51	Apr 23, 1990	Great Western Forum, Inglewood, California, U.S.	Lost WBC super bantamweight title
45	Win	40–4–1	Park Chan-yong	SD	12	Dec 3, 1989	Sunin Gymnasium, Incheon, South Korea	Retained WBC super bantamweight title
44	Win	39–4–1	Frankie Duarte	TKO	10 (12), 1:54	Aug 31, 1989	Great Western Forum, Inglewood, California, U.S.	Retained WBC super bantamweight title
43	Win	38–4–1	Paul Banke	SD	12	Jun 22, 1989	Great Western Forum, Inglewood, California, U.S.	Retained WBC super bantamweight title
42	Win	37–4–1	Valerio Nati	KO	5 (12), 1:06	Nov 26, 1988	Palazzo dello sport, Forli, Emilia Romagna, Italy	Retained WBC super bantamweight title
41	Draw	36–4–1	Seung Hoon Lee	SD	12	May 29, 1988	Hongkuk Gymnasium, Yeosu, South Korea	Retained WBC super bantamweight title
40	Win	36–4	Carlos Zárate Serna	TKO	10 (12), 2:54	Feb 29, 1988	Great Western Forum, Inglewood, California, U.S.	Won vacant WBC super bantamweight title
39	Win	35–4	Noe Gonzalez	KO	7 (?)	Dec 17, 1987	Arena Naucalpan, Naucalpan de Juárez, México, Mexico	
38	Win	34–4	Darryl Thigpen	PTS	12	Jul 31, 1987	Memorial Coliseum, Corpus Christi, Texas, U.S.	
37	Win	33–4	Ramiro Adames	TKO	5 (10)	Jun 28, 1987	Las Americas Arena, Houston, Texas, U.S.	
36	Win	32–4	Aaron Lopez	UD	12	Apr 3, 1987	Freeman Coliseum, San Antonio, Texas, U.S.	Retained NABF super bantamweight title
35	Win	31–4	Mike Ayala	KO	7 (12), 0:38	Dec 6, 1986	Freeman Coliseum, San Antonio, Texas, U.S.	Won NABF super bantamweight title
34	Win	30–4	Raul Negrete	TKO	7 (?)	Aug 29, 1986	Tijuana, Baja California, Mexico	
33	Win	29–4	Antonio Gonzalez	PTS	10	Jul 4, 1986	Tijuana, Baja California, Mexico	
32	Loss	28–4	Jeff Fenech	UD	10	Apr 11, 1986	Entertainment Centre, Perth, Western Australia, Australia	
31	Loss	28–3	Miguel Lora	UD	12	Aug 9, 1985	Tamiami Fairgrounds Auditorium, Miami, Florida, U.S.	Lost WBC bantamweight title
30	Win	28–2	Fred Jackson	DQ	7 (12), 1:30	May 4, 1985	Concorde Boxing Arena, Oranjestad, Aruba	Won vacant WBC bantamweight title; Jackson was disqualified because of an intentional head-butt
29	Win	27–2	Jorge Ramirez	PTS	12	Nov 30, 1984	La Paz, Baja California Sur, Mexico	Retained Mexico bantamweight title
28	Win	26–2	Jorge Ramirez	DQ	11 (12)	Sep 21, 1984	Plaza de Toros Alberto Balderas, Ciudad Juarez, Chihuahua, Mexico	Retained Mexico bantamweight title Ramirez was disqualified for butting
27	Win	25–2	Mario Gomez	TKO	3 (12)	May 21, 1984	Tijuana, Baja California, Mexico	Retained Mexico bantamweight title
26	Win	24–2	Patrick Young	TKO	4 (?)	Mar 16, 1984	Auditorio del Estado, Mexicali, Baja California, Mexico	
25	Win	23–2	Javier Marquez	TKO	5 (12)	Feb 18, 1984	Mexicali, Baja California, Mexico	Retained Mexico bantamweight title
24	Win	22–2	Rigoberto Estrada	PTS	12	Dec 16, 1983	Ciudad Juarez, Chihuahua, Mexico	Retained Mexico bantamweight title
23	Win	21–2	Rodolfo Martínez	TKO	11 (12)	Oct 29, 1983	Guadalajara, Jalisco, Mexico	Retained Mexico bantamweight title
22	Win	20–2	Martin Torres	TKO	5 (12)	Sep 26, 1983	Tijuana, Baja California, Mexico	Retained Mexico bantamweight title
21	Loss	19–2	Harold Petty	UD	12	Aug 8, 1983	Astro Arena, Houston, Texas, U.S.	For NABF bantamweight title
20	Win	19–1	Jesus Lopez	PTS	12	May 27, 1983	Ciudad Juarez, Chihuahua, Mexico	Retained Mexico bantamweight title
19	Win	18–1	Rigoberto Estrada	PTS	12	Mar 18, 1983	Ciudad Juarez, Chihuahua, Mexico	Retained Mexico bantamweight title
18	Win	17–1	Lorenzo Ramirez	PTS	10	Jan 29, 1983	Sports Arena, Los Angeles, California, U.S.	
17	Win	16–1	Jesus Lopez	PTS	12	Nov 29, 1982	Tijuana, Baja California, Mexico	Retained Mexico bantamweight title
16	Win	15–1	Jorge Ramirez	PTS	12	Sep 4, 1982	Mexico City, Distrito Federal, Mexico	Won Mexico bantamweight title
15	Loss	14–1	Harold Petty	UD	10	Jul 29, 1982	Showboat Hotel & Casino, Las Vegas, Nevada, U.S.	
14	Win	14–0	Ramon Concha	TKO	2 (?)	Apr 23, 1982	Acapulco, Guerrero, Mexico	
13	Win	13–0	Francisco Paco Mayo	TKO	5 (?)	Mar 5, 1982	Acapulco, Guerrero, Mexico	
12	Win	12–0	Miguel Juarez	PTS	10	Feb 12, 1982	Acapulco, Guerrero, Mexico	
11	Win	11–0	Mario Chavez	PTS	10	Nov 21, 1981	Mexicali, Baja California, Mexico	
10	Win	10–0	Julio Avendano	KO	4 (?)	Oct 30, 1981	Acapulco, Guerrero, Mexico	
9	Win	9–0	Javier Marquez	TKO	8 (?)	Sep 16, 1981	Mexicali, Baja California, Mexico	
8	Win	8–0	Rayito Gonzalez	TKO	4 (10)	Aug 28, 1981	Campeche, Campeche, Mexico	
7	Win	7–0	Alonzo Gonzalez	PTS	10	Jul 22, 1981	Los Angeles, California, U.S.	
6	Win	6–0	Roque Guillen	TKO	3 (?)	Jun 27, 1981	Tuxtla Gutierrez, Chiapas, Mexico	
5	Win	5–0	Jose Zapata	PTS	10	May 15, 1981	Villahermosa, Tabasco, Mexico	
4	Win	4–0	Jesus Maravilla	KO	2 (?)	Mar 29, 1981	Villahermosa, Tabasco, Mexico	
3	Win	3–0	Joel Segura	KO	10 (10)	Feb 21, 1981	Merida, Yucatán, Mexico	
2	Win	2–0	Porfirio Urrutia	TKO	3 (?)	Dec 19, 1980	Tampico, Tamaulipas, Mexico	
1	Win	1–0	Mario Ernesto Gutierrez	KO	4 (?)	Oct 17, 1980	Poza Rica, Veracruz, Mexico	

== Titles in boxing ==
=== Major world titles ===
- WBC bantamweight champion (118 lbs)
- WBC super bantamweight champion (122 lbs) (3x)

=== Regional/International titles ===
- Mexico bantamweight title
- NABF super bantamweight champion (122 lbs)

== See also ==
- List of Mexican boxing world champions
- List of world bantamweight boxing champions
- List of world super-bantamweight boxing champions

Sporting positions
Regional boxing titles
Preceded by Mike Ayala	NABF super bantamweight champion December 6, 1986 – 1988; Vacated	Vacant Title next held by Louie Espinoza
World boxing titles
Vacant Title last held by Alberto Dávila	WBC bantamweight champion May 4, 1985 – August 9, 1985	Succeeded by Miguel Lora
Vacant Title last held by Jeff Fenech	WBC super bantamweight champion February 29, 1988 – April 23, 1990	Succeeded by Paul Banke
Preceded by Kiyoshi Hatanaka	WBC super bantamweight champion June 14, 1991 – March 20, 1992	Succeeded by Thierry Jacob
Preceded by Hector Acero Sánchez	WBC super bantamweight champion November 6, 1995 – September 6, 1997	Succeeded by Érik Morales
