= Dametto =

Dametto is an Italian surname. Notable people with the surname include:

- Giancarlo Dametto (born 1959), Italian volleyball player
- Nick Dametto (born 1983), Australian politician
- Paolo Dametto (born 1993), Italian footballer
