= Paul Banke =

American boxer (born 1964)

Personal information
- Nationality: American
- Born: Paul Andre Banke; March 1, 1964 (age 62) Blythe, California, U.S.
- Height: 5 ft 4 1/2 in (164 cm)
- Weight: Super bantamweight

Boxing career
- Reach: 65 in (165 cm)
- Stance: Southpaw

Boxing record
- Total fights: 30
- Wins: 21
- Win by KO: 11
- Losses: 9

Paul Andre Banke (/ˈbæŋki/ BANK-ee; born March 1, 1964) is a former World Boxing Council Super Bantamweight champion boxer, and is the first American boxer to go public with an AIDS diagnosis. Having lived 29 years after being diagnosed with AIDS, Banke, who accepted medical treatment, is the longest living professional boxer with the disease.

== Career ==
Banke turned pro in 1985. After losing a 12-round split decision to Daniel Zaragoza in June 1989, Banke captured the WBC Super Bantamweight Title in April 1990 with an upset ninth-round TKO victory over Daniel Zaragoza. He defended his title once in August 1990 with a twelfth round stoppage of undefeated Ki Hoon Lee in South Korea, knocking Lee down three times. He was knocked down three times in the fourth round, and lost his WBC title to Pedro Ruben Decima by fourth round stoppage in November 1990. Banke lost five of his last six bouts, including a 12-round WBC rematch title loss to Zaragoza in their third meeting. After a ten-round decision loss to winless 0-8 Mexican journeyman Juan Francisco Soto in December 1993, Banke retired at age 29 with a record of 21–9 with 11 knockouts.

== Later life ==
Banke, who battled drug use during his career and overcame it, was diagnosed with AIDS in 1995, approximately two years after his final fight. After returning to drug use, Banke successfully completed a drug rehab program. Banke, who resides in Los Feliz, California, has chronic traumatic encephalopathy, also known as dementia pugilistica, an aftereffect from his professional boxing career. Chronic traumatic encephopathy is a neurodegenerative disease resulting from repeated head trauma.

== Professional boxing record ==
30 fights	21 wins	9 losses
By knockout	11	3
By decision	10	6

No.	Result	Record	Opponent	Type	Round, time	Date	Location	Notes
30	Loss	21–9	Juan Francisco Soto	PTS	10 (10)	1993-12-06	Forum, Inglewood, California, U.S.	
29	Loss	21–8	Antonio Ramirez	MD	10 (10)	1993-08-28	Forum, Inglewood, California, U.S.	
28	Loss	21–7	Kennedy McKinney	RTD	6 (12)	1992-03-20	Caesars Palace, Paradise, Nevada, U.S.	
27	Loss	21–6	Daniel Zaragoza	UD	12 (12)	1991-12-09	Forum, Inglewood, California, U.S.	For WBC super bantamweight title
26	Win	21–5	Antonio Ramirez	UD	10 (10)	1991-10-26	Desert Expo Center, Indio, California, U.S.	
25	Loss	20–5	Pedro Rubén Décima	TKO	4 (12)	1990-11-05	Forum, Inglewood, California, U.S.	Lost WBC super bantamweight title
24	Win	20–4	Ki Joon Lee	TKO	12 (12)	1990-08-18	Sunin Gymnasium, Incheon, South Korea	Retained WBC super bantamweight title
23	Win	19–4	Daniel Zaragoza	TKO	9 (12)	1990-04-23	Forum, Inglewood, California, U.S.	Won WBC super bantamweight title
22	Win	18–4	Lucilo Nolasco	SD	10 (10)	1989-12-08	Richfield High School, Richfield, Utah, U.S.	
21	Win	17–4	José Luis Soto	KO	2 (10)	1989-10-12	Richfield High School, Richfield, Utah, U.S.	
20	Loss	16–4	Daniel Zaragoza	SD	12 (12)	1989-06-22	Forum, Inglewood, California, U.S.	For WBC super bantamweight title
19	Win	16–3	Ramiro Adames	TKO	6 (12)	1989-01-09	Forum, Inglewood, California, U.S.	Won vacant WBA Americas super bantamweight title
18	Win	15–3	Carlos Romero	TKO	11 (12)	1988-09-13	Forum, Inglewood, California, U.S.	
17	Win	14–3	Robert Shannon	UD	10 (10)	1988-07-13	Forum, Inglewood, California, U.S.	
16	Win	13–3	Alberto Mercado	KO	3 (10)	1988-05-09	Forum, Inglewood, California, U.S.	
15	Win	12–3	Lucilo Nolasco	PTS	10 (10)	1988-03-07	Forum, Inglewood, California, U.S.	
14	Win	11–3	Ramon Rico	PTS	10 (10)	1987-12-11	Civic Auditorium, San Jose, California, U.S.	
13	Loss	10–3	Jesus Poll	KO	7 (12)	1987-08-13	Forum, Inglewood, California, U.S.	
12	Win	10–2	Héctor Lizárraga	UD	10 (10)	1987-07-15	Raincross Square, Riverside, California, U.S.	
11	Win	9–2	Tony Talley	TKO	6 (8)	1987-06-12	Raincross Square, Riverside, California, U.S.	
10	Win	8–2	Willie Garcia	KO	2 (5)	1987-05-28	Olympic Auditorium, Los Angeles, California, U.S.	
9	Loss	7–2	Andre Smith	MD	8 (8)	1987-04-20	Civic Auditorium, Santa Monica, California, U.S.	
8	Loss	7–1	Pete Solarez	PTS	5 (5)	1986-08-05	Showboat Hotel and Casino, Las Vegas, Nevada, U.S.	
7	Win	7–0	Ralph Gutierrez	UD	4 (4)	1986-07-25	Showboat Hotel and Casino, Las Vegas, Nevada, U.S.	
6	Win	6–0	Ralph Gutierrez	UD	4 (4)	1986-06-13	Sahara Hotel & Casino, Space Center, Winchester, Nevada, U.S.	
5	Win	5–0	Arturo Lozado	UD	6 (6)	1986-02-07	Cal Poly Pomona Gym, Pomona, California, U.S.	
4	Win	4–0	Juvenal Molina	PTS	4 (4)	1985-11-20	Olympic Auditorium, Los Angeles, California, U.S.	
3	Win	3–0	Miguel Rodella	KO	2 (4)	1985-11-17	Coachella Valley High School, Thermal, California, U.S.	
2	Win	2–0	Mike Perez	KO	3 (4)	1985-08-24	Pride Pavilion, Phoenix, Arizona, U.S.	
1	Win	1–0	Elmer Mejia	TKO	2 (4)	1985-08-03	Pony Express, Phoenix, Arizona, U.S.	

== See also ==
- List of world super-bantamweight boxing champions
- List of southpaw stance boxers

Sporting positions
World boxing titles
Preceded by Daniel Zaragoza	WBC super bantamweight champion April 23, 1990 – November 5, 1990	Succeeded by Pedro Rubén Décima
