= Michèle Ricaud =

French swimmer

Personal information
- Born: 28 February 1961 (age 65)

Sport
- Sport: Swimming
Medal record
Women's swimming
Representing France
Mediterranean Games
| Gold medal – first place | 1979 Split | 100 m backstroke |
| Gold medal – first place | 1979 Split | 200 m backstroke |

Michèle Ricaud (born 28 February 1961) is a French former swimmer who competed in the 1980 Summer Olympics.
