= Kiyoshi Hatanaka =

Japanese boxer (born 1967)

Kiyoshi Hatanaka 畑中 清詞
Personal information
- Nationality: Japanese
- Born: March 7, 1967 (age 59) Kitanagoya, Aichi, Japan
- Height: 5 ft 6 1/2 in (169 cm)
- Weight: Super flyweight; Super bantamweight

Boxing career
- Reach: 69 in (175 cm)
- Stance: Orthodox

Boxing record
- Total fights: 25
- Wins: 22
- Win by KO: 15
- Losses: 2
- Draws: 1

Kiyoshi Hatanaka (畑中 清詞, Hatanaka Kiyoshi; born March 7, 1967) is a retired Japanese boxer who is a former WBC super bantamweight champion.

== Amateur career ==
Hatanaka began karate at the first grade of elementary school, and won the Japanese championship in the juvenile division at its sixth grade and the first grade of junior high school. In addition, he began football at the fourth grade of elementary school, and was scouted by a prestigious high school. He also set an interval record in the local ekiden race at the age of a junior high school student. At that time, informed from an acquaintance that a professional boxer got paid 30,000 yen per match in the amount of time, he became interested in boxing and joined Matsuda Boxing Gym. He compiled an amateur record of 26–5 (21 KOs) before turning professional.

== Professional career ==
Hatanaka made his professional debut with a first-round knockout victory in November 1984, at the age of a high school student. He won the annual Japanese boxing series, All-Japan Rookie King Tournament in the super flyweight division in March 1986. He captured the Japanese super flyweight title at the Korakuen Hall in February 1987.

In his first world title shot against WBC super flyweight champion Gilberto Román in September 1988, Hatanaka entered the ring of the Nagoya Rainbow Hall with full smile. Román floored Hatanaka in the first round, but was docked a point for a low blow late in the same round. Though Hatanaka was given a full five minutes to recover, he was hit below the belt again in the third round and took three minutes' rest. As the rounds rolled on, Román kept his pace to retain his title via a unanimous decision. Hatanaka was so nervous that he remembered almost nothing after the fight.

After the defeat, Hatanaka decided to become a world champion from his beloved hometown of Nagoya by any means necessary. It was no longer a question of money for him. Hatanaka needed a reliable trainer. He asked Toshihide Tsutsumi three times who once worked as a trainer at Matsuda Boxing Gym, and was at last accepted. He trained with Tsutsumi and did not get anxious anymore.

Hatanaka moved up two weight divisions and fought against Pedro Rubén Décima for the WBC super bantamweight title at the Nagoya International Exhibition Hall, aka Port Messe Nagoya, on February 3, 1991. He was floored in the first round, but felt calm enough to listen to Tsutsumi's instruction between rounds. After knocking down Décima four times in the fourth round, he sent him to the canvas two more times in the seventh and eighth rounds before the referee stopped the bout.

In his first defense against Daniel Zaragoza on June 14 of that year, Hatanaka was cut on the corner of his left eye from an accidental head butt in the fourth round, and the referee took a point away from Zaragoza. From the seventh or eighth round, Hatanaka had triple vision in his right eye, and the blood flowed into his left eye. Finally, Zaragoza was crowned the new champion via a split decision in front of 9,000 spectators at the Nagoya Rainbow Hall. In 2007, Alvaro Morales of ESPN Deportes wrote it as many Asians' consideration, "the best fight of the decade". Although Hatanaka desired a rematch with Zaragoza, he suffered from ophthalmoplegia caused by this fight, and retired as a boxer after four months.

== Professional boxing record ==
| 25 fights | 22 wins | 2 losses |
|---|---|---|
| By knockout | 15 | 0 |
| By decision | 7 | 2 |
| Draws | 1 | |

| No. | Result | Record | Opponent | Type | Round, time | Date | Location | Notes |
|---|---|---|---|---|---|---|---|---|
| 25 | Loss | 22–2–1 | Daniel Zaragoza | SD | 12 (12) | 1991-06-14 | Rainbow Hall, Nagoya, Japan | Lost WBC super bantamweight title |
| 24 | Win | 22–1–1 | Pedro Rubén Décima | TKO | 8 (12) | 1991-02-03 | Rainbow Hall, Nagoya, Japan | Won WBC super bantamweight title |
| 23 | Win | 21–1–1 | Ric Bajelot | TKO | 8 (10) | 1990-12-04 | Tsuyuhashi Sports Center, Nagoya, Japan | |
| 22 | Win | 20–1–1 | Somsak Srichan | PTS | 10 (10) | 1990-08-05 | Tsuyuhashi Sports Center, Nagoya, Japan | |
| 21 | Win | 19–1–1 | Sawaeng Thaweekoon | KO | 2 (10) | 1990-03-04 | Tsuyuhashi Sports Center, Nagoya, Japan | |
| 20 | Win | 18–1–1 | Somboonyod Singsamang | TKO | 2 (10) | 1989-11-25 | City Gymnasium, Toyota, Japan | |
| 19 | Draw | 17–1–1 | Jang Kyun Oh | PTS | 10 (10) | 1989-09-07 | Tsuyuhashi Sports Center, Nagoya, Japan | |
| 18 | Win | 17–1 | Noel Cornelio | KO | 7 (10) | 1989-05-30 | Tsuyuhashi Sports Center, Nagoya, Japan | |
| 17 | Win | 16–1 | Dong Chun Lee | PTS | 10 (10) | 1989-01-24 | Tsuyuhashi Sports Center, Nagoya, Japan | |
| 16 | Loss | 15–1 | Gilberto Román | UD | 12 (12) | 1988-09-04 | Rainbow Hall, Nagoya, Japan | For WBC super flyweight title |
| 15 | Win | 15–0 | Constancio Dangla | KO | 3 (10) | 1988-02-26 | Tsuyuhashi Sports Center, Nagoya, Japan | |
| 14 | Win | 14–0 | Surasit Meeprasert | KO | 1 (10) | 1987-10-27 | Tsuyuhashi Sports Center, Nagoya, Japan | |
| 13 | Win | 13–0 | Teruaki Miyazato | PTS | 10 (10) | 1987-07-10 | Tsuyuhashi Sports Center, Nagoya, Japan | Retained Japanese super flyweight title |
| 12 | Win | 12–0 | Tadashi Maruo | KO | 3 (10) | 1987-02-23 | Korakuen Hall, Tokyo, Japan | Won Japanese super flyweight title |
| 11 | Win | 11–0 | Masaki Sono | KO | 2 (10) | 1986-10-18 | City Hall, Nagoya, Japan | |
| 10 | Win | 10–0 | Tadashi Maruo | PTS | 10 (10) | 1986-07-14 | Korakuen Hall, Tokyo, Japan | |
| 9 | Win | 9–0 | Takashi Hirata | PTS | 8 (8) | 1986-05-09 | City Hall, Nagoya, Japan | |
| 8 | Win | 8–0 | Hiromitsu Tatsuki | KO | 1 (6) | 1986-03-04 | Nishinari Ward Center, Osaka, Japan | |
| 7 | Win | 7–0 | Akio Kawamata | PTS | 6 (6) | 1985-11-30 | City Gymnasium, Hamamatsu, Japan | |
| 6 | Win | 6–0 | Takuji Hijiri | PTS | 4 (4) | 1985-10-08 | City Hall, Nagoya, Japan | |
| 5 | Win | 5–0 | Shinpei Sato | KO | 1 (4) | 1985-07-28 | Tatsumioka Hall, Okazaki, Japan | |
| 4 | Win | 4–0 | Shuichi Sakakibara | KO | 1 (4) | 1985-06-26 | City Hall, Nagoya, Japan | |
| 3 | Win | 3–0 | Shigehito Hayashi | KO | 1 (4) | 1985-04-29 | Sakuranomiya Skating Rink, Osaka, Japan | |
| 2 | Win | 2–0 | Tadaharu Sanuki | TKO | 1 (4) | 1985-02-05 | Prefectural Gymnasium, Osaka, Japan | |
| 1 | Win | 1–0 | Harelya Yamauchi | KO | 1 (4) | 1984-11-27 | City Hall, Nagoya, Japan | |

== Later life ==
Currently he is the president of Hatanaka Boxing Gym in Nagoya. Hatanaka Promotions has provided a boxing television program Soul Fighting on Chubu-Nippon Broadcasting. Toshihide Tsutsumi who was presented with the tenth Eddie Townsend Award in 1999, serves as a trainer at that gym.

== See also ==
- Boxing in Japan
- List of Japanese boxing world champions
- List of world super-bantamweight boxing champions

== Bibliography ==
- Boxing Magazine editorial department, ed. (May 31, 2002). 日本プロボクシング史 世界タイトルマッチで見る50年 (Japan Pro Boxing History – 50 Years of World Title Bouts) (in Japanese). Tokyo, Japan: Baseball Magazine Sha Co., Ltd. pp. 130, 175–176, 297. ISBN 978-4-583-03695-3.
- Jun'ichi Hirata; et al. (January 15, 2000). "畑中清詞〜6度のダウン奪い名古屋初の王者へ〜". In Boxing Magazine editorial department (ed.). The Glorious Moments 究極の栄光・世界チャンピオン名鑑 – 日本ボクシング史に輝く41人の男たち. B.B.mook; 117, sports series; No.72 (in Japanese). Tokyo, Japan: Baseball Magazine Sha Co., Ltd. pp. 12, 78–79. ISBN 978-4-583-61076-4.

Sporting positions
Regional boxing titles
| Preceded by Tadashi Maruo | Japanese super flyweight champion February 23, 1987 – 1987; Vacated | Vacant Title next held by Yoshiyuki Uchida |
World boxing titles
| Preceded by Pedro Rubén Décima | WBC super bantamweight champion February 3, 1991 – June 14, 1991 | Succeeded by Daniel Zaragoza |
