= Maurizio Stecca =

Italian boxer (born 1963)

Personal information
- Nationality: Italian
- Born: Maurizio Stecca; 9 March 1963 (age 63) Santarcangelo di Romagna, Italy
- Height: 5 ft 6 1/2 in (169 cm)
- Weight: Featherweight

Boxing career
- Stance: Orthodox

Boxing record
- Total fights: 53
- Wins: 49
- Win by KO: 22
- Losses: 4
- Draws: 0
- No contests: 0
Medal record
Men's amateur boxing
Representing Italy
Olympic Games
Gold medal – first place	1984 Los Angeles	Bantamweight
World Cup
Gold medal – first place	1983 Rome	Bantamweight

Maurizio Stecca (born 9 March 1963) is a retired Italian boxer, who won the Bantamweight Gold medal at the 1984 Summer Olympics and WBO Featherweight title at 1991. He is the younger brother of former super bantamweight world champion of boxing, Loris Stecca.

== Professional career ==
Stecca began his professional career in 1984 and compiled a career record of 49–4–0. He won the WBO Featherweight Title in 1991 and successfully defended it three times.

== Amateur accomplishments ==
- 1979-1981 Italian Bantamweight Champion
- 1984 Olympic Bantamweight Gold Medalist

== 1984 Olympic Results ==
Below are the results of Maurizio Stecca, an Italian bantamweight boxer who competed at the 1984 Los Angeles Olympics:

- Round of 32: Defeated Philip Sutcliffe Snr (Ireland) on points
- Round of 16: Defeated Star Zulu (Zambia) on points
- Quarterfinal: Defeated Robinson Pitalua (Colombia) on points
- Semifinal: Defeated Pedro Nolasco (Dominican Republic) on points
- Final: Defeated Héctor López (Mexico) on points (won gold medal)

Achievements
Regional boxing titles
Preceded by Fabrice Benichou	European featherweight champion 18 December 1992 – 29 March 1993	Succeeded by Herve Jacob
Preceded by Herve Jacob	European featherweight champion 28 May – 24 September 1993	Succeeded by Stéphane Haccoun
World boxing titles
Inaugural Champion	WBO featherweight champion 28 January – 11 November 1989	Succeeded by Louie Espinoza
Vacant Title last held by Jorge Páez	WBO featherweight champion 26 January 1991 - 16 May 1992	Succeeded by Colin McMillan
