= Cinzia Savi Scarponi =

Italian swimmer (born 1963)

Personal information
- Full name: Cinzia Savi Scarponi
- Nationality: Italian
- Born: 12 November 1963 (age 62) Rome, Italy
- Height: 1.70 m (5 ft 7 in)
- Weight: 59 kg (130 lb)

Sport
- Sport: Swimming
- Strokes: Butterfly
Medal record
European Championships
Bronze medal – third place	1983 Rome	100 m butterfly
Mediterranean Games
Gold medal – first place	1979 Split	100 m butterfly
Gold medal – first place	1979 Split	200 m butterfly
Gold medal – first place	1979 Split	400 m medley
Gold medal – first place	1979 Split	4x100 m freestyle
Gold medal – first place	1979 Split	4x100 m medley
Gold medal – first place	1983 Casablanca	100 m butterfly
Gold medal – first place	1983 Casablanca	200 m butterfly
Gold medal – first place	1983 Casablanca	200 m medley
Gold medal – first place	1983 Casablanca	4x100 m medley
Summer Universiade
Silver medal – second place	1983 Edmonton	100 m butterfly
Silver medal – second place	1983 Edmonton	200 m medley
Silver medal – second place	1983 Edmonton	400 m medley

Cinzia Savi Scarponi (born 12 November 1963) is an Italian former swimmer who competed in the 1980 Summer Olympics.
