= Gustavo Torrijos =

Spanish swimmer

Personal information
- Born: September 23, 1962 (age 63)

Sport
- Sport: Swimming
- Strokes: Breaststroke
Medal record
Representing Spain
Mediterranean Games
Silver medal – second place	1983 Casablanca	100m breaststroke

Gustavo Torrijos (born 23 September 1962) is a Spanish former breaststroke swimmer who competed in the 1980 Summer Olympics.
