= Louis Gomis (boxer) =

French boxer (born 1963)

Louis Gomis (born 15 January 1963 in Dakar, Senegal) is a French boxer who competed in the men's bantamweight event at the 1984 Summer Olympics.
