= Annick de Susini =

French swimmer

Personal information
- Born: May 17, 1960 (age 66)

Sport
- Sport: Swimming
- Strokes: Breaststroke
Medal record
Representing France
Mediterranean Games
Gold medal – first place	1979 Split	200m breaststroke
Bronze medal – third place	1979 Split	100m breaststroke

Annick de Susini (born 17 May 1960) is a French former swimmer who competed in the 1976 Summer Olympics and in the 1980 Summer Olympics.
