= Dale Walters =

Canadian boxer (born 1963)

Personal information
- Born: September 27, 1963 (age 62) Port Alice, British Columbia
Medal record
Men's boxing
Representing Canada
Olympic Games
Bronze medal – third place	1984 Los Angeles	Bantamweight

Dale Walters (born September 27, 1963) is a retired Canadian boxer and former child actor. During his boxing career, he won a bantamweight bronze medal at the 1984 Summer Olympics.

== Acting career ==
Walters appeared as a child actor in several Canadian television series in the late 1970s and early 1980s. He attended Burnaby Central Secondary school alongside Michael J. Fox, who subsequently moved to Los Angeles to pursue his acting career. Walters had prominent roles in Huckleberry Finn and His Friends (1979) and Ritter's Cove (1980). He returned to some other minor acting roles after his Olympic Games appearance in 1984 (see below).

== Junior amateur boxing ==
One of the more important junior international tournaments that Walters engaged in took place on June 6, 1976, in Victoria, BC, hosted by the London Boxing Club. The tournament was called "Northwest Counties S.A.B.A. Team of England" vs The British Columbia Team". Walters fought in the fourth bout against England's J.J. Grant.

== Olympic boxing career ==
During Walters's 15-year amateur career he was never beaten by a Canadian boxer. Further, he never lost an amateur bout (including international competitions) on Canadian soil. The five-time national champion had a career record of 165 wins and 12 losses and was selected Most Outstanding Boxer at three National Championships. He represented Canada at the 1983 Pan American Games.

Walters won a bronze medal as a Bantamweight at the Los Angeles Games in 1984. It was Canada's first Olympic boxing medal in 52 years.

== 1984 Olympic boxing results ==
Below is the Olympic record of Dale Walters, a Canadian boxer who competed in the bantamweight division at the 1984 Olympics in Los Angeles:

- Round of 64: bye
- Round of 32: defeated Mustapha Kouchene (Algeria) 5-0
- Round of 16: defeated Hiroaki Takami (Japan) 5-0
- Quarterfinal: defeated Pedro Ruben Decima (Argentina) 5-0
- Semifinal: lost to Héctor López (Mexico) 0–5; was awarded a bronze medal

== Professional boxing career ==
Walters' professional boxing career lasted just 19 months. Competing as a bantamweight, he began with a decision victory over Clint Hannah on April 10, 1985, in Vancouver. In November 1986 he took on Canadian boxing legend Tony Pep in a bout for the Canadian featherweight championship. He was TKO'd in the 10th round. It was his last fight as a professional. Walters finished his career with a record of seven wins and one loss.

== Post-retirement ==
Walters was inducted into the Canadian Boxing Hall of Fame in 1996.

He has also worked as a boxing analyst for television and radio broadcasts throughout his career and currently owns a gym in Vancouver, BC, Ringside Fitness.

Walters, who briefly played in his youth, is an active supporter for the game of box lacrosse. He was instrumental in organizing an ownership group that attempted to bring professional lacrosse back to Vancouver in 2008.

== Halls of fame ==
Walters has been inducted into the following Halls of Fame:

- Burnaby Sports Hall of Fame
- BC Sports Hall of Fame
- BC Amateur Boxing Hall of Fame
- Canadian Boxing Hall of Fame
