= Esko Rechardt =

Finnish sailor

Medal record

Men's Sailing

Representing Finland

Olympic Games
Gold medal – first place	1980 Moscow	Finn class

Esko Tapani Rechardt (born 9 May 1958 in Helsinki) is a Finnish sailor and Olympic champion. He won a gold medal in the Finn class at the 1980 Moscow Summer Olympics, whose sailing competitions were held in Tallinn.

He sailed on Martela OF during the 1989–90 Whitbread Round the World Race.

== Biography ==
Rechardt has a master's degree in engineering, and after his sporting career has designed bridges, such as the bridge connecting the Korkeasaari zoo to Helsinki mainland.
