= John Hyland (boxer) =

British boxer

Personal information
- Nationality: British
- Born: 20 June 1962 (age 62); Liverpool, England

Sport
- Sport: Boxing

John Hyland (born 20 June 1962) is a British boxer. He competed in the men's bantamweight event at the 1984 Summer Olympics.

He won the 1983 and 1984 Amateur Boxing Association British bantamweight title, when boxing out of the St. Ambrose ABC.
