= Hiroaki Takami =

Japanese boxer

Personal information
- Nationality: Japanese
- Born: 7 August 1960 (age 64); Saga, Saga, Japan

Sport
- Sport: Boxing

Hiroaki Takami (高見 公明, Takami Hiroaki; born 7 August 1960) is a Japanese boxer. He competed in the men's bantamweight event at the 1984 Summer Olympics.

At the Olympics, Takami got a bye in the first round and defeated Egypt's Gamal El-Din El-Koumy in the next round, before losing to Canada's Dale Walters.
