= Stefan Gertel =

German boxer

Personal information
- Nationality: German
- Born: 12 May 1960 (age 66) Worms, West Germany

Sport
- Sport: Boxing
Medal record
Men's amateur boxing
Representing West Germany
World Military Championships
Silver medal – second place	1981 Camp Lejeune	Bantamweight
European Championships
Bronze medal – third place	1981 Tampere	Bantamweight

Stefan Gertel (born 12 May 1960) is a German boxer. He competed in the men's bantamweight event at the 1984 Summer Olympics. He was also the most probable West German runner-up for the 1980 Summer Olympics, but the West German government decided to join the U.S.-imposed boycott, so Gertel missed the event together with the rest of the FRG Olympic squad.
