= Metello Savino =

Italian swimmer (1963–2023)

Personal information
- Born: 13 May 1963
- Died: 10 May 2023 (aged 59) Como, Italy

Sport
- Sport: Swimming
Medal record
Representing Italy
Mediterranean Games
Gold medal – first place	1983 Casablanca	4x100m freestyle relay

Metello Savino (13 May 1963 – 10 May 2023) was an Italian swimmer who competed in the 1984 Summer Olympics. Savino died in Como on 10 May 2023, at the age of 59.
