= Hugh Dyer =

Belizean boxer

Personal information
- Nationality: Belize
- Born: 26 May 1961 (age 65)

Sport
- Sport: Boxing
- Weight class: Bantamweight

Hugh Dyer (26 May 1961) is a former boxer, who competed for Belize at the 1984 Summer Olympics.

At the 1984 Summer Olympics which were held in Los Angeles, Dyer received a bye in the first of the Bantamweight competition, is the second round he came up against Colombian boxer Robinsón Pitalúa, Dyer was out boxed and the referee stopped the contest in the second round.
