= Guido De Luigi =

Italian volleyball player

Personal information
- Nationality: Italian
- Born: 17 February 1963 (age 63); Turin, Italy
- Height: 194 cm (6 ft 4 in)

Volleyball information
- Position: Middle blocker
- Number: 8
Medal record
Men's volleyball
Representing Italy
Olympic Games
Bronze medal – third place	1984 Los Angeles	Team

Guido De Luigi (born 17 February 1963) is an Italian former volleyball player who competed in the 1984 Summer Olympics.

In 1984, De Luigi was part of the Italian team that won the bronze medal in the Olympic tournament.
