= Paolo Vecchi =

Italian volleyball player

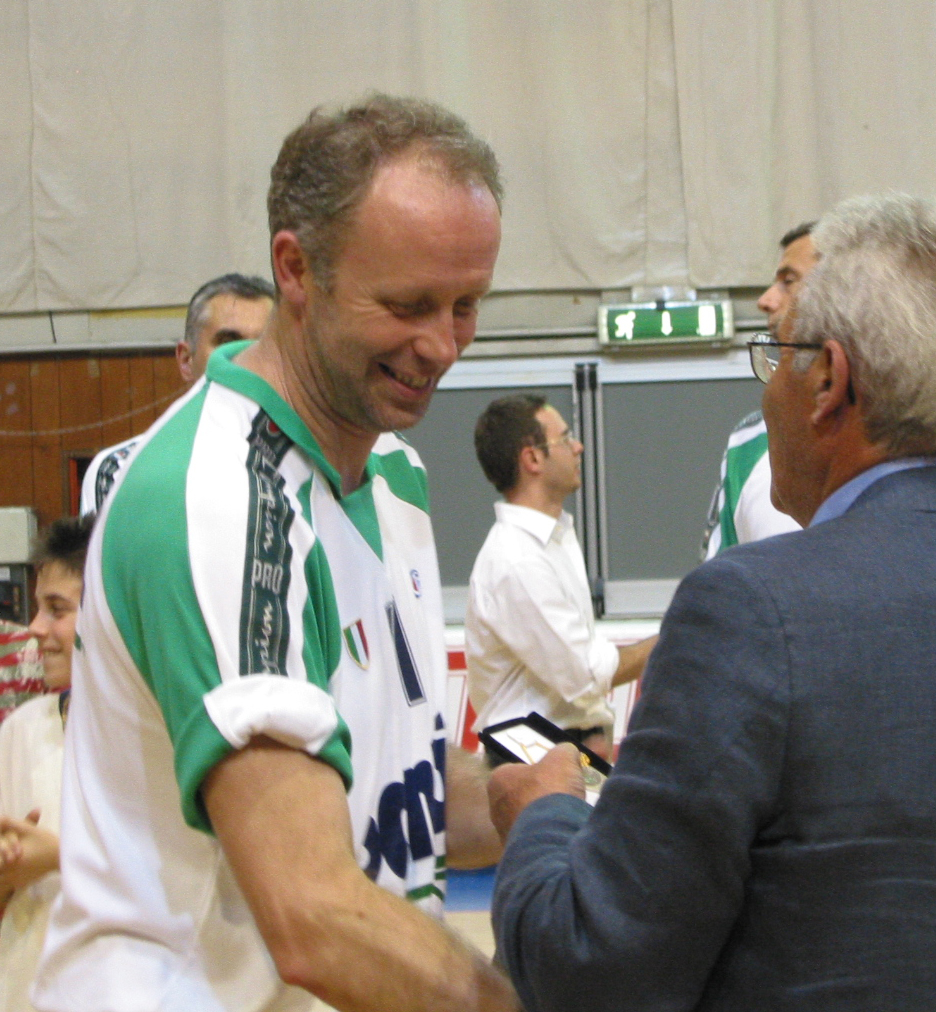
- Paolo Vecchi at 2005 Maxitàl friendly match

Personal information
- Born: 19 February 1959 (age 67); Sala Baganza, Province of Parma, Italy
- Height: 194 cm (6 ft 4 in)

Volleyball information
- Position: Middle blocker
- Number: 11

National team
1983–1984	Italy
Honours
Men's volleyball
Representing Italy
Olympic Games
Bronze medal – third place	1984 Los Angeles	Team
Mediterranean Games
Gold medal – first place	1983 Casablanca	Team

Paolo Vecchi (born 19 February 1959) is an Italian former volleyball player who competed in the 1984 Summer Olympics.

Vecchi was born in Parma.

In 1984, Vecchi was part of the Italian team that won the bronze medal in the Olympic tournament.
