= Cemal Öner =

Turkish boxer

Personal information
- Nationality: Turkish
- Born: 1 November 1966 (age 58)

Sport
- Sport: Boxing

Cemal Öner (born 1 November 1966) is a Turkish boxer. He competed in the men's bantamweight event at the 1984 Summer Olympics.
