= Manuel Vilchez =

Venezuelan boxer (born 1961)

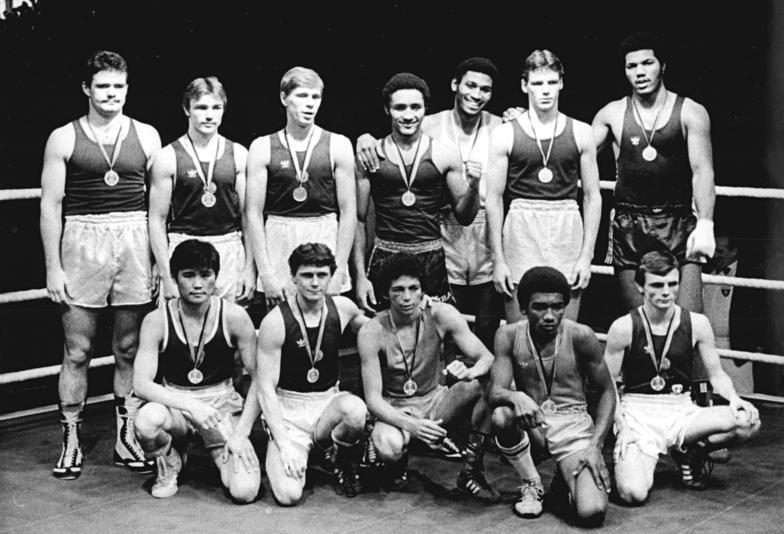
- Frank Rauschning and Manuel Vilchez (right) at the awards ceremony of the 1983 Chemistry Cup

Personal information
- Full name: Manuel Vilchez Suárez
- Nationality: Venezuela
- Born: October 21, 1961 (age 64)
- Height: 1.73 m (5 ft 8 in)
- Weight: 54 kg (119 lb)

Sport
- Sport: Boxing
- Weight class: Bantamweight
Medal record
Pan American Games
Gold medal – first place	1983 Caracas	Bantamweight

Manuel Vilchez (born October 21, 1961) is a former Venezuelan boxer. At the 1984 Summer Olympics he lost in the first round of the men's bantamweight division (– 54 kg) to Uganda's John Siryakibbe. A year earlier he claimed the gold medal in the same division at the Pan American Games by defeating Pedro Nolasco of the Dominican Republic in the final.

Vilchez challenged Louie Espinoza for the World Boxing Association super-bantamweight title at Phoenix, Arizona, United States in 1987, but he lost by a 15th-round knockout.

== 1984 Olympic results ==
Below is the record of Manuel Vilchez, a Venezuelan bantamweight boxer who competed in the 1984 Los Angeles Olympics:

- Round of 64: lost to John Siryakibbe (Uganda) by decision, 2-3
