= Jarmo Eskelinen =

Finnish boxer (born 1962)

Personal information
- Nationality: Finnish
- Born: 17 May 1962 (age 62); Kajaani, Finland

Sport
- Sport: Boxing

Jarmo Eskelinen (born 17 May 1962) is a Finnish boxer. He competed at the 1984 Summer Olympics and the 1988 Summer Olympics.
