= Syed Ghulam Moinuddin =

Pakistani field hockey player (born 1958)

Personal information
- Born: 17 February 1958 (age 68) Islamabad, Pakistan
- Died: alive alive
Medal record
Men's field hockey
Representing Pakistan
Olympic Games
Gold medal – first place	1984 Los Angeles	Team competition

Syed Ghulam Moinuddin (born 17 February 1958) is a former field hockey player from Pakistan. He was the member of the winning Pakistani team in 1984 Summer Olympics. He was born in Islamabad and now lives in Houston Texas.
