= Johny Asadoma =

Indonesian boxer

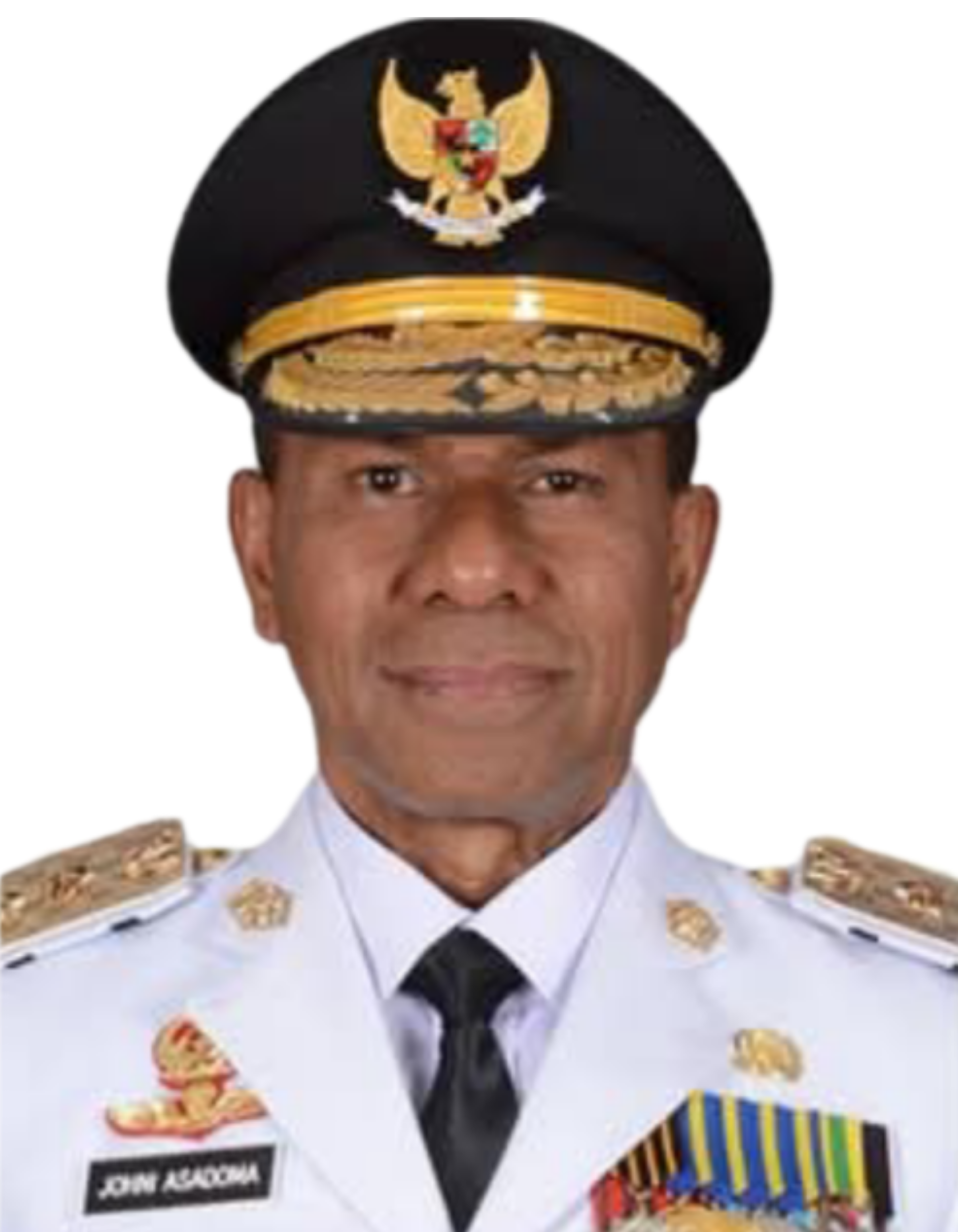
Johny Asadoma as a vice-governor .

Johny Asadoma (born January 8, 1966, in Denpasar) is a current vice-governor of the East Nusa Tenggara province and a former Indonesian amateur boxer. After his retirement from boxing, Asadoma joined the Indonesia's academy of police, and became a police officer of Indonesia.

== Career as a boxer ==
- Bronze Medalist (flyweight) in Indonesian Golden Gloves Championship 1982, in Denpasar
- Gold Medalist (flyweight) Sea Games 1983, Singapore
- Gold medalist President's Cup 1984, Jakarta
- Los Angeles Olympic Games 1984: lost KO 3 to Héctor López (Mexico) in the first round.

== Career as a policeman ==
- Commander of Indonesian police contingent in United Nations' Peace Keeping Force in Darfur, Sudan (October 2008)
