= Giuditta Pandini =

Italian swimmer (born 1960)

Eleonora Pandini
Personal information
- Born: 8 February 1960 (age 66) Milan, Italy

Sport
- Sport: Swimming
Medal record
Representing Italy
Mediterranean Games
Gold medal – first place	1975 Algiers	400m freestyle
Gold medal – first place	1975 Algiers	4x100m freestyle relay
Bronze medal – third place	1979 Split	800m freestyle

Eleonora Giuditta Pandini (born 8 February 1960 in Milan) is an Italian former swimmer who competed in two events at the 1976 Summer Olympics.
