= Khalid Hamid =

Pakistani field hockey player

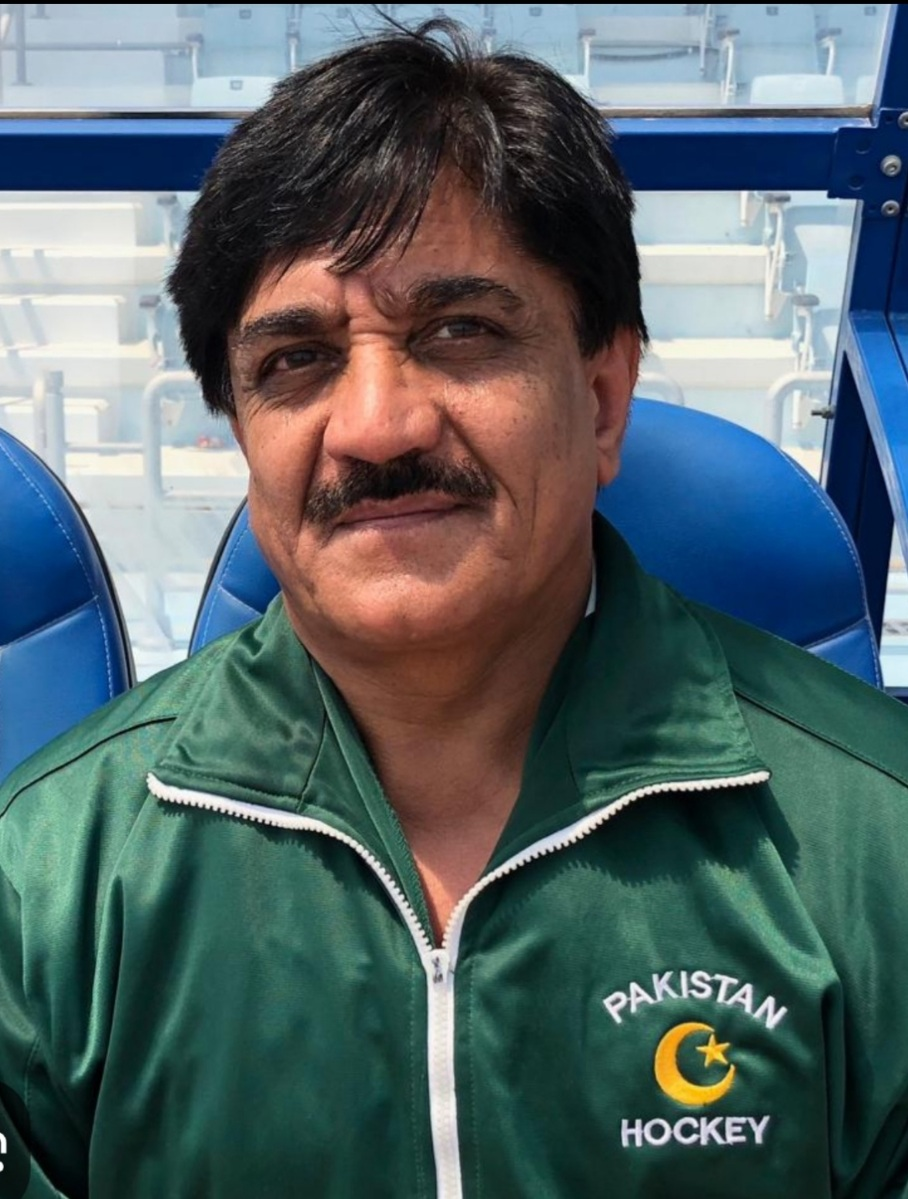

Personal information
- Nationality: Pakistani
- Born: 18 October 1962 (age 63) Gujranwala
- Spouse: Mrs Judat khalid
- Children: Daughter = Shazaq Khalid (Doctor) Son = Roshaan Khalid (Mechanical Engineer)

Sport
- Sport: Field hockey
Medal record
Men's Field hockey
Representing Pakistan
Olympic Games
Gold medal – first place	1984 Los Angeles	Team
Asia Cup
Gold medal – first place	1985 Asia Cup	Team
World Champions Trophy
Silver medal – second place	1983 World Champions Trophy	Team
Silver medal – second place	1984 World Champions Trophy	Team
Silver medal – second place	1988 World Champions Trophy	Team

Khalid Hamid (born 18 October 1962) is a field hockey player from Pakistan. He was born in Gujranwala. He won a gold medal at the 1984 Summer Olympics in Los Angeles after joining the Pakistan national hockey team in 1980. He played India vs Pakistan test series in 1981, the Puma Trophy in 1981 in Frankfurt, the Peugeot Trophy in 1981 in Amsterdam, the 2nd Junior World Cup in 1982 at Kuala Lumpur, the Sultan Azlan Shah trophy in 1983 in Kuala Lumpur, the Top 10 Nations Hockey tournament in 1983 in Hong Kong, and the World Champions Trophy Tournament in 1983, 1984, and 1988. He also represented Pakistan in the 3rd Asia Cup in 1985 in Dhaka, the India vs Pakistan test series in 1988, and the 1988 Summer Olympics in Seoul, among many other international events. He earned 150 caps and scored 20 goals.

In recognition of his services to Pakistan in the game of field hockey, he was awarded the Presidential Medal for Pride of Performance (صدارتی تمغۂ برائے حسنِ کارکردگی) in 1988 by the Government of Pakistan. After concluding his playing career, he started coaching the Pakistan men's national field hockey team. He also coached UAE field hockey clubs and the Qatar men's national hockey team. The Pakistan Hockey Federation appointed him as a selector for four years to choose the national senior and junior teams.

In 2025, he coached the Washington University in St. Louis field hockey club team. Concurrently, he worked as a private coach, providing specialized one-on-one technical instruction to high school students in Greater St. Louis. He is currently a staff field hockey coach for the St. John's School.

Outside of sports, Hamid worked at Pakistan International Airlines (PIA) and retired in 2023 after a nearly three-decade-long career. His notable roles included serving as PIA's Country Manager in Qatar and regional manager at PIA's Head Office in Karachi.
