= Marco Colombo =

Italian swimmer

Personal information
- Born: 2 August 1960 (age 65) Bergamo, Italy

Sport
- Sport: Swimming

Marco Colombo (born 2 August 1960) is an Italian swimmer. He competed in three events at the 1984 Summer Olympics.
