= Franco Bertoli =

Italian former volleyball player

Personal information
- Nickname: Mano di pietra ("Stone hand")
- Nationality: Italian
- Born: 29 April 1959 (age 67); Udine, Italy
- Hometown: Udine
- Height: 192 cm (6 ft 4 in)

Volleyball information
- Position: Outside hitter
- Number: 12 (1980); 4 (1984)

National team
| 1980–1986 | Italy |
Medal record
Men's volleyball
Representing Italy
Olympic Games
| Bronze medal – third place | 1984 Los Angeles | Team |
Mediterranean Games
| Gold medal – first place | 1983 Casablanca | Team |

Franco Bertoli (born 29 April 1959, in Udine) is an Italian former volleyball player who competed in the 1980 Summer Olympics in Moscow and in the 1984 Summer Olympics in Los Angeles.

As a volleyball player, he gained the nickname of "Mano di pietra" ("Stone hand") for his attack skills.

In 1980, Bertoli was part of the Italian team that finished ninth in the Olympic tournament. He played four matches. Four years later, he won the bronze medal with the Italian team in the 1984 Olympic tournament. He played all six matches. In total, he gained 219 caps with the Italian national team and was also appointed captain of the national team. He was declared best overall player in the 1983 European Championships in Berlin.

== Club volleyball ==
In his club career, Bertoli was a mainstay of Klippan Torino (1977-1983) first and then of Panini Modena (1984-1990), two of the most successful Italian teams in the 1980s. Later, he moved to Milan Volley, a short-lived volley companion of Silvio Berlusconi's AC Milan, where he won two World Cups in 1990 and 1992. Subsequently, he worked as a coach for Modena's volleyball team (He won the Italian and European Championship in 1998) in Rome and Genova.

== Personal life ==
Bertoli was a TV commentator for Sky Sports Italia for about eleven years, until the London Olympic Games in 2012.

Now he works as a professional coach and is a member of the ICF (International Coach Federation). He is also an accredited Teacher in Numerology, Dip. CSN. AIN. and an Aura-Soma Colour-Care System Coach.
