= Sofia Dara =

Greek swimmer (born 1963)

Personal information
- Born: 14 July 1963 (age 62) Piraeus, Greece

Sport
- Sport: Swimming
Medal record
Representing Greece
Mediterranean Games
Gold medal – first place	1983 Casablanca	400m freestyle
Bronze medal – third place	1983 Casablanca	100m freestyle
Bronze medal – third place	1983 Casablanca	200m freestyle
Bronze medal – third place	1983 Casablanca	800m freestyle

Sofia Dara (born 14 July 1963) is a Greek swimmer. She competed at the 1980 Summer Olympics and the 1984 Summer Olympics.

She was named the Greek Female Athlete of the Year for 1976 and 1977.
