= Piero Rebaudengo =

Italian volleyball player

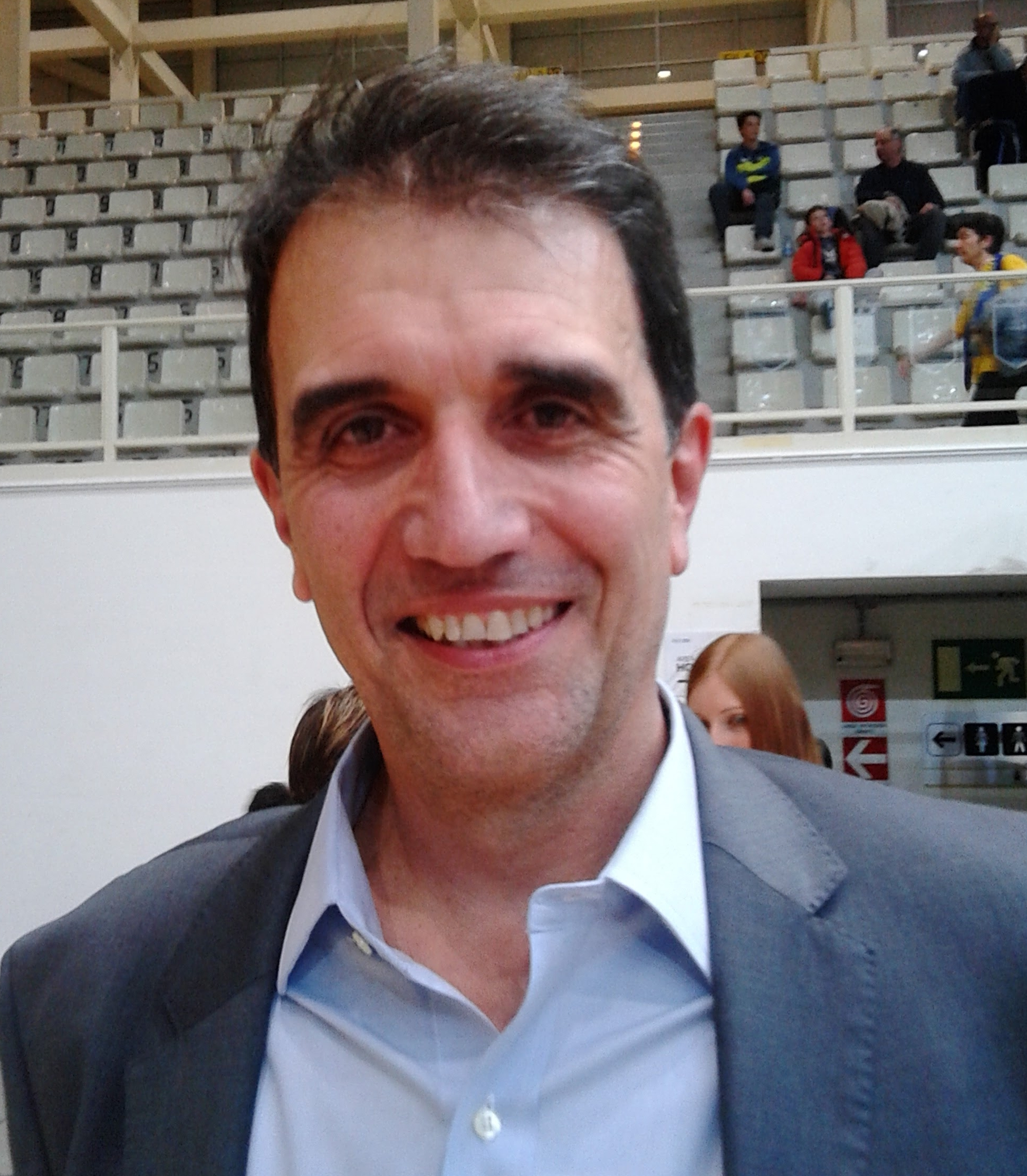
- Piero Rebaudengo

Personal information
- Born: 13 September 1958 (age 68); Turin, Italy
- Height: 190 cm (6 ft 3 in)

Volleyball information
- Position: Setter
- Number: 6

National team
1981–1984	Italy
Honours
Men's volleyball
Representing Italy
Olympic Games
Bronze medal – third place	1984 Los Angeles	Team

Piero Rebaudengo (born 13 September 1958) is an Italian former volleyball player who competed in the 1984 Summer Olympics.

Rebaudengo was born in Turin.

In 1984, Rebaudengo was part of the Italian team that won the bronze medal in the Olympic tournament.
