= Olivier Borios =

French swimmer

Personal information
- Born: 23 June 1959 (age 67)
Medal record
Men's swimming
Representing France
Mediterranean Games
Gold medal – first place	1979 Split	100m Breaststroke

Olivier Borios (born 23 June 1959) is a retired breaststroke swimmer from France, who represented his native country at the 1980 Summer Olympics in Moscow, Soviet Union. He claimed the gold medal a year earlier at the 1979 Mediterranean Games in the Men's 100m Breaststroke event.

He has been 10 times national champion of the 100 meters breaststroke (winter and summer 1978, winter and summer 1979, winter and summer 1980, winter and summer 1981, winter and summer 1982) and 9 times national champion of the 200 meters breaststroke (winter and summer 1977, winter and summer 1978, winter 1979, winter and summer 1980, winter and summer 1981).

He swam at the EN Castres, at the Cercle des nageurs d'Antibes, at the Racing Club de France and at the Toulouse Athletic Club (TAC), where he currently swims and coaches other swimmers.
