= Giovanni Lanfranco (volleyball) =

Italian volleyball player

Personal information
- Nationality: Italian
- Born: 9 May 1956 (age 70); Turin, Italy
- Height: 1.88 m (6 ft 2 in)
- Weight: 80 kg (180 lb)

Volleyball information
- Position: Middle blocker
- Number: 10

Career
Teams
	CUS Torino; Pallavolo Parma
Honours
Men's volleyball
Representing Italy
Olympic Games
Bronze medal – third place	1984 Los Angeles	Team
World Championship
Silver medal – second place	1978 Rome
Mediterranean Games
Gold medal – first place	1983 Casablanca	Team
Silver medal – second place	1975 Algiers	Team

Giovanni Lanfranco (born 9 May 1956) is a retired Italian volleyball player. He was part of Italian teams that finished second at the 1975 Mediterranean Games and 1978 World Championships, third at the 1984 Summer Olympics, eighth at the 1976 Summer Olympics, and ninth at the 1980 Summer Olympics.
