= Fabio Vullo =

Italian volleyball player

Personal information
- Born: 1 September 1964 (age 62); Massa, Italy
- Height: 198 cm (6 ft 6 in)
- Weight: 90 kg (198 lb)

Volleyball information
- Position: Setter
- Number: 9

National team
1984–1992	Italy
Honours
Men's volleyball
Representing Italy
Olympic Games
Bronze medal – third place	1984 Los Angeles	Team
Mediterranean Games
Gold medal – first place	1983 Casablanca	Team

Fabio Vullo (born 1 September 1964) is a retired talian volleyball player.

Vullo, standing at 1.98 m for 87 kg, was born in Massa, and played as setter (although at the beginning of his long career was employed also as hitter). Vullo revolutionized the role of the setter, because he was, along with the Dutch Peter Blangé, one of the first setters in the world capable to set the ball from a greater height and to be dangerous in attack, block, and serve. Before Vullo and Blangé, most of the setters were much shorter (usually not taller than 1.90 m), but nowadays it is common to see setters who are over 2.00m tall, and are effective blockers and servers.

Despite being widely considered one of world's best setters ever, Vullo was rarely given playing time by the Italian national team, due to his conflicts with coach Julio Velasco. He therefore did not take part in many of the victories of that team during the 1990s. With the Italian national team, he only won one World League in 1992.

At the club level, Vullo competed in Italy's Serie A1, where he won eight Italian league titles, seven CEV Champions League titles four with Modena and three with Ravenna and one European Champions Cup, in addition to several other domestic and European honours.

Vullo stopped playing in 2004, and is currently working as a television commentator.

== Clubs ==
Club	Country	From	To
Turin	Italy	1982–1983	1985–1986
Panini Modena	Italy	1986–1987	1989–1990
Ravenna	Italy	1990–1991	1993–1994
Modena	Italy	1994–1995	1999–2000
Sisley Treviso	Italy	2000–2001	2001–2002
Macerata	Italy	2003–2004	2003–2004
