= Manuela Carosi =

Italian swimmer (born 1965)

Personal information
- Born: 13 June 1965 (age 61) Rome, Italy
- Height: 1.81 m (5 ft 11 in)

Sport
- Sport: Swimming
- Strokes: Backstroke
Medal record
Women's swimming
Representing Italy
Mediterranean Games
Gold medal – first place	1979 Split	4×100 m medley
Gold medal – first place	1983 Casablanca	100 m backstroke
Gold medal – first place	1983 Casablanca	200 m backstroke
Gold medal – first place	1983 Casablanca	4×100 m medley
Gold medal – first place	1987 Latakia	100 m backstroke
Gold medal – first place	1987 Latakia	4×100 m medley
European LC Championships
Silver medal – second place	1989 Bonn	4×100 m medley

Manuela Carosi (born 13 June 1965 in Rome) is a retired backstroke swimmer from Italy. She represented her native country at three consecutive Summer Olympics, starting in 1980. Carosi is a three-time gold medalist at the Mediterranean Games.
