= Giovanni Errichiello =

Italian volleyball player

Personal information
- Nationality: Italian
- Born: 12 June 1960 (age 66); Naples, Italy
- Height: 194 cm (6 ft 4 in)

Volleyball information
- Position: Middle blocker
- Number: 7

National team
1982–1986	Italy
Medal record
Men's volleyball
Representing Italy
Olympic Games
Bronze medal – third place	1984 Los Angeles	Team
Mediterranean Games
Gold medal – first place	1983 Casablanca	Team

Giovanni Errichiello (born 12 June 1960) is an Italian former volleyball player who competed in the 1984 Summer Olympics.

Errichiello was born in Naples.

In 1984, Errichiello was part of the Italian team that won the bronze medal in the Olympic tournament. He played all six matches.
