= Babar Ali Khan (boxer) =

Pakistani boxer (1963–2025)

Personal information
- Nationality: Pakistani
- Born: 5 August 1963
- Died: 5 September 2025 (aged 62); Lahore, Punjab, Pakistan

Sport
- Sport: Boxing

Babar Ali Khan (Urdu: بابر علی خان; 5 August 1963 – 5 September 2025) was a Pakistani boxer. He competed in the men's bantamweight event at the 1984 Summer Olympics, reaching the second round.

Babar died in Lahore on 5 September 2025, at the age of 62.
