= Fabrizio Rampazzo =

Italian swimmer (born 1963)

Personal information
- Born: April 7, 1963 (age 63) Padua, Italy

Sport
- Sport: Swimming
- Club: Gruppo Sportivo Fiamme Oro
Medal record
Representing Italy
Mediterranean Games
Gold medal – first place	1979 Split	4x100m freestyle relay
Gold medal – first place	1979 Split	4x200m freestyle relay
Gold medal – first place	1979 Split	4x100m medley relay
Gold medal – first place	1987 Latakia	100m butterfly
Gold medal – first place	1987 Latakia	4x200m freestyle relay
Gold medal – first place	1987 Latakia	4x100m medley relay
Silver medal – second place	1979 Split	100m butterfly
Bronze medal – third place	1987 Latakia	100m freestyle

Fabrizio Rampazzo (born 7 April 1963) is an Italian former swimmer who competed in the 1980 Summer Olympics, in the 1984 Summer Olympics, and in the 1988 Summer Olympics. He was born in Padua.

Rampazzo is a former athlete of the Gruppo Sportivo Fiamme Oro.
