= Maurizio Colombo =

Italian cyclist

Personal information
- Born: 16 July 1963 (age 63) Milan, Italy

Cycling career
- Sport: Cycling

Maurizio Colombo (born 16 July 1963) is an Italian former cyclist. He competed in the individual pursuit and team pursuit events at the 1984 Summer Olympics.
