= Pier Paolo Lucchetta =

Italian volleyball player

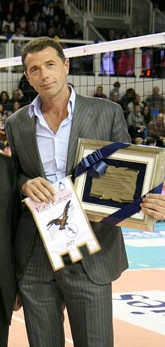
- Pier Paolo Lucchetta

Personal information
- Born: 14 January 1963 (age 63); Treviso, Province of Treviso, Italy
- Height: 198 cm (6 ft 6 in)

Volleyball information
- Position: Outside hitter
- Number: 2

National team
1984–1988	Italy
Honours
Men's volleyball
Representing Italy
Olympic Games
Bronze medal – third place	1984 Los Angeles	Team
Mediterranean Games
Gold medal – first place	1983 Casablanca	Team

Pier Paolo Lucchetta (born 14 January 1963) is an Italian former volleyball player who competed in the 1984 Summer Olympics and in the 1988 Summer Olympics. He was born in Treviso. Four years later, he won the bronze medal with the Italian team in the 1984 Olympic tournament. He played all six matches.
