= Robinsón Pitalúa =

Colombian boxer (1964–1985)

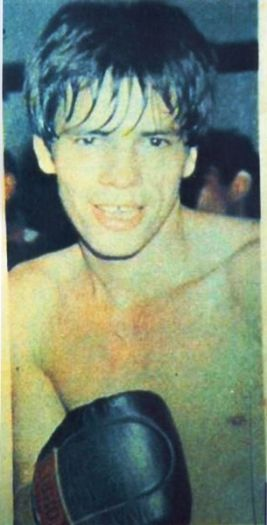
- portrait of Robinson Pitalua

Personal information
- Born: September 3, 1964
- Died: September 22, 1985 (aged 21)
Medal record
Men's Boxing
Representing Colombia
Pan American Games
Bronze medal – third place	1983 Caracas	Bantamweight

Robinson Pitalúa Támara (September 3, 1964 – September 22, 1985) was a Colombian boxer, who represented his native country at the 1984 Summer Olympics in Los Angeles in the Men's Bantamweight division.

Born in Montería, Córdoba Pitalúa won the bronze medal in the same weight category a year earlier at the 1983 Pan American Games. He died in a drowning accident 1985 in Miami, Florida, USA.

== Achievements ==
- IX Bolivarian Games, Barquisimeto, VEN, 1981. Silver. Lost to Manuel Vilchez.
- III World Championship, Munich, GER, 1982. Ninth place. Lost to Klaus-Dieter Kirchstein.
- Inter-Continental Tournament, Colorado Springs, USA, 1982. Gold. Defeated Héctor López.
- II Suramerican Championship, Guayaquil, ECU, 1983. Silver. Lost to Manuel Vilchez.
- Pan American Games, Caracas, VEN, 1983. Bronze. Lost to Pedro Nolasco.
- Olympic Festival, Mexico, MEX, 1984. Gold.
- XXIII Olympic Games, Los Angeles, USA, 1984. Fifth place. Defeated Hugh Dyer and Barbar Ali Khan. Lost to Maurizio Stecca.
- Four-time National Champion.
- Amateur record: 83-12-0.
- Professional debut: November 23, 1984 against Manuel Mendoza.
- Professional Record: 6-0-0, 4 KO's.
