= Véronique Jardin =

French swimmer (1966–2023)

Personal information
- Born: September 15, 1966
- Died: June 8, 2023 (aged 56)

Sport
- Sport: Swimming

Véronique Jardin (15 September 1966 – 8 June 2023) was a French freestyle swimmer who competed in the 1984 Summer Olympics and in the 1992 Summer Olympics. She was the mother of Béryl Gastaldello.

Jardin died on 8 June 2023, at the age of 56.
