= Pedro Nolasco (boxer) =

Dominican Republic boxer (1962–1995)

Personal information
- Full name: Pedro Julio Nolasco
- Nationality: Dominican Republic
- Born: February 20, 1962 La Romana
- Died: September 15, 1995 (aged 33) La Romana

Sport
- Sport: Boxing
- Weight class: Bantamweight
Medal record
Olympic Games
Bronze medal – third place	1984 Los Angeles	Bantamweight
Pan American Games
Silver medal – second place	1979 San Juan	Flyweight
Silver medal – second place	1983 Caracas	Bantamweight

Pedro Nolasco (February 2, 1962 – September 15, 1995) was a Dominican boxer, who won the bronze medal in the men's bantamweight category at the 1984 Summer Olympics in Los Angeles, United States.

This was the first Olympic medal of the Dominican Republic. A year earlier he won a silver at the 1983 Pan American Games. He was born in La Romana, Dominican Republic.

Nolasco turned pro in 1986 and had limited success, possibly a result of having moved up the professional ladder too quickly. In 1987 he dropped a pair of fights to future champion Tony Lopez. Later in the year he lost a by first-round knockout to former world champ Victor Callejas. In 1989 he took on Maurizio Stecca for the newly created WBO Featherweight Title, but lost in a 6th-round TKO.

Nolasco was shot and killed in an attempted robbery at his home in La Romana on September 15, 1995, at the age of 33.

== Results ==
=== 1979 Pan American Games ===
- Defeated Antonio Toledo (Brazil) points
- Defeated Jorge Rodríguez (Colombia) points
- Defeated Jerome Coffee (United States) points
- Lost to Alberto Mercado (Puerto Rico) points

=== 1983 Pan American Games ===
- Lost to Manuel Vilchez (Venezuela) points

=== 1984 Olympic Games ===
- Defeated Ljubisa Simic (Yugoslavia) points
- Defeated John Siryakibbe (Uganda) points
- Defeated John John Molina (Puerto Rico) points
- Defeated Sung-Kil Moon (South Korea) TKO 1
- Lost to Maurizio Stecca (Italy) points

Olympic Games
Preceded by Marisela Peralta	Flagbearer for Dominican Republic; Los Angeles 1984	Succeeded by Juan Núñez
