= Louie Espinoza =

American boxer (born 1962)

Personal information
- Nickname: Sharpshooter
- Born: Louie Espinoza; May 12, 1962 (age 64) Winkelman, Arizona, U.S.
- Height: 5 ft 8 in (173 cm)
- Weight: Super bantamweight; Featherweight

Boxing career
- Stance: Orthodox

Boxing record
- Total fights: 66
- Wins: 52
- Win by KO: 44
- Losses: 12
- Draws: 2

Louie Espinoza (born May 12, 1962) is an American boxer in the Featherweight division. He now resides in Chandler, Arizona.

Espinoza turned pro in 1982 and won the Vacant WBA Super Bantamweight Title in 1987 by defeating Tommy Valoy, becoming the first world champion boxer from Arizona in history. He defended the title twice before losing it to Julio Gervacio later that year. In 1989 he took on IBF Featherweight Title holder Jorge Páez but came up short in a draw. He won the WBO Featherweight Title later that year by beating Maurizio Stecca by TKO, but lost the belt the following year in a close decision loss in a rematch with Páez.

Regional boxing titles
| Vacant Title last held by Daniel Zaragoza | NABF Super Bantamweight Champion; April 8, 1988 – May 27, 1988 | Succeeded by Jesus Poll |
World boxing titles
| Vacant Title last held by Victor Callejas | WBA Super Bantamweight Champion; January 16, 1987 – November 28, 1987 | Succeeded by Julio Gervacio |
| Preceded by Maurizio Stecca | WBO featherweight champion November 11, 1989 – April 7, 1990 | Succeeded by Jorge Páez |
