= Carlotta Tagnin =

Italian former swimmer (born 1965)

Personal information
- Born: January 28, 1965 (age 61)

Sport
- Sport: Swimming
- Strokes: Breaststroke
Medal record
Representing Italy
Mediterranean Games
Gold medal – first place	1979 Split	100m breaststroke
Gold medal – first place	1979 Split	4x100m medley relay
Silver medal – second place	1979 Split	200m breaststroke

Carlotta Tagnin (born 28 January 1965) is an Italian former breaststroke swimmer who competed in the 1984 Summer Olympics.
