= Raffaele Avagnano =

Italian swimmer (born 1963)

Personal information
- Full name: Raffaele Avagnano
- Nationality: Italian
- Born: 21 August 1963 (age 62)
- Height: 1.80 m (5 ft 11 in)

Sport
- Sport: Swimming
- Strokes: Breaststroke
Medal record
Mediterranean Games
Gold medal – first place	1983 Casablanca	100m Breaststroke

Raffaele Avagnano (born 21 August 1963) is a retired breaststroke swimmer from Italy, who represented his native country at the 1984 Summer Olympics in Los Angeles, California. He claimed the gold medal a year earlier at the 1983 Mediterranean Games in the Men's 100m Breaststroke event.
