= Giancarlo Dametto =

Italian volleyball player

Personal information
- Nationality: Italian
- Born: 6 January 1959 (age 67); Turin, Italy
- Height: 195 cm (6 ft 5 in)

Volleyball information
- Position: Middle blocker
- Number: 3

National team
1980–1984	Italy
Medal record
Men's volleyball
Representing Italy
Olympic Games
Bronze medal – third place	1984 Los Angeles	Team

Giancarlo Dametto (born 6 January 1959) is an Italian former volleyball player who competed in the 1980 Summer Olympics and in the 1984 Summer Olympics.

Dametto was born in Turin.

In 1980, Dametto was part of the Italian team that finished ninth in the Olympic tournament. He played all five matches.

Four years later, Dametto won the bronze medal with the Italian team in the 1984 Olympic tournament. He played all six matches.
