= Héctor López (boxer) =

Mexican boxer

Personal information
- Nickname: Torero
- Born: Héctor López Colín; February 1, 1967 Mexico City, Mexico
- Died: October 24, 2011 (aged 44)
- Height: 5 ft 9 in (175 cm)
- Weight: Super featherweight; Lightweight; Light welterweight

Boxing career
- Reach: 70 in (178 cm)
- Stance: Orthodox

Boxing record
- Total fights: 49
- Wins: 41
- Win by KO: 23
- Losses: 7
- Draws: 1
Medal record
Representing Mexico
Men's boxing
Olympic Games
Silver medal – second place	1984 Los Angeles	Bantamweight

Héctor López Colín (February 1, 1967 – October 24, 2011) was a Mexican professional boxer. He challenged for the WBC lightweight title in 1993 and the WBO light welterweight title twice between 1995 and 1999. At regional level he held the WBC-NABF light welterweight title twice between 1992 and 1993, and the WBO-NABO light welterweight title between 1996 and 1997. As an amateur he represented Mexico at the 1984 Olympics, winning a silver medal in the bantamweight division.

== Amateur career ==
López, who was born in Mexico City, was a Mexican National Amateur Champion. During the 1984 Summer Olympics he won the Bantamweight Silver Medal, at seventeen years old Héctor was the youngest boxer in the whole Olympics.

=== Olympic results ===
Below are the results of Hector Lopez, a Mexican bantamweight boxer who competed at the 1984 Los Angeles Olympics:

- Round of 32: Defeated Johny Asadoma (Indonesia) KO 3
- Round of 16: Defeated Joe Orewa (Nigeria) on points
- Quarterfinal: Defeated Ndaba Dube (Zimbabwe) on points
- Semifinal: Defeated Dale Walters (Canada) on points
- Final: Lost to Maurizio Stecca (Italy) on points (was awarded silver medal)

== Pro career ==
Héctor began his professional career in 1985 as a Bantamweight but later moved up to Lightweight and defeated former champion Juan LaPorte. That fight would set up a bout with the undefeated Mexican Miguel Ángel González for the WBC Lightweight Championship in 1993. López lost a twelve-round unanimous decision and decided on moving up to Light Welterweight, losing to a young Kostya Tszyu in 1994. He later challenged Sammy Fuentes and Randall Bailey for the WBO World Light Welterweight Title but lost both bouts. López retired after beating veteran Jerry Rosenberg by T.K.O. in the third round.

== Personal life ==
Héctor López was born in Mexico City but was raised in Glendale, California, United States, and even played American football at Glendale Hoover High School. He grew up and trained with Mexican American Olympic gold medalist Paul Gonzales.
