= Roberta Lanzarotti =

Italian swimmer

Personal information
- Born: 11 January 1968 (age 58) Tradate, Italy

Sport
- Sport: Swimming

Roberta Lanzarotti (born 11 January 1968) is an Italian former butterfly swimmer. She competed in three events at the 1984 Summer Olympics.
