= Maurizio Divano =

Italian swimmer

Personal information
- Born: 27 August 1961 (age 64) Genoa, Italy

Sport
- Sport: Swimming

Maurizio Divano (born 27 August 1961) is an Italian swimmer. He competed in two events at the 1984 Summer Olympics.
