= Robert Shannon (boxer) =

American boxer (born 1962)

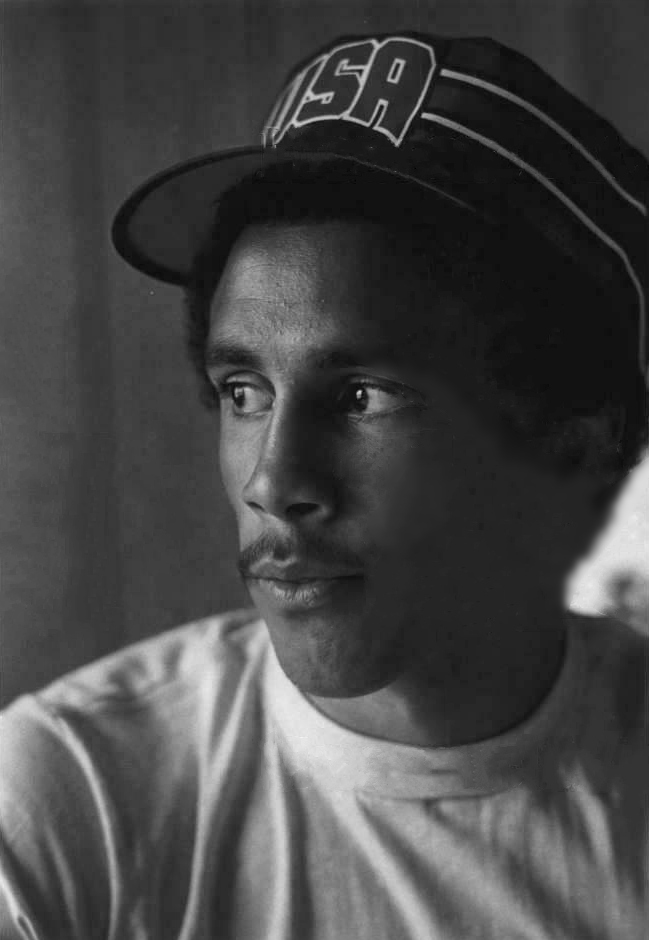
- Shannon in 1984

Personal information
- Nationality: American
- Born: November 11, 1962 (age 63) Seattle, Washington, US
- Height: 5 ft 5 in (165 cm)
- Weight: Super bantamweight

Boxing career
- Stance: Orthodox

Boxing record
- Total fights: 26
- Wins: 18
- Win by KO: 8
- Losses: 6
- Draws: 2

Robert Edward Shannon (born November 11, 1962) is an American former professional boxer.

== Background ==
Shannon, who had a white mother and black father, started fighting in the streets as a young boy in Seattle's predominantly black Central District where he found kids who would start fights with him because he was white. He later moved to Lynnwood, Washington, where he continued to get into fights, this time with white kids who fought him because he was black.

== Amateur career ==
After beating up one kid, he was invited to a gym where he began boxing at the age of 12. He would capture a national junior championship at 15 and a world junior championship at the age of 16. Shannon qualified for the 1980 Olympic games as a 17-year-old at 106 pounds, but did not compete due to the 1980 Summer Olympics boycott. In 2007, he received one of 461 Congressional Gold Medals created especially for the spurned athletes. He also qualified for the Olympics in 1984 at 119 pounds, but was eliminated in the third bout against Sung-Kil Moon of South Korea. He was the only member of the 1984 USA Olympics boxing team who did not win a medal. Shannon's amateur record was 124–27.

=== Amateur highlights ===
- 1980 National AAU Champion – 106 pounds
- 1980 Olympic Trials – defeated Tommy Ayers to qualify
- 1982 United States Amateur championships 119 pounds – lost to Meldrick Taylor in final (5–0)
- 1984 National Golden Gloves bantamweight champion
- 1984 Olympic Trials – defeated Jesse Benavides on points 5–0, to qualify

== Professional career ==
Shannon turned professional in 1984 and was undefeated in his first 15 fights before losing a split decision to future champion Greg Richardson in 1986. The following year Shannon lost to future champ Jose Sanabria and his career began to slide. He retired from the sport in 1990 later worked as a barber and a boxing trainer at his own gym.
