= Star Zulu =

Zambian boxer

Personal information
- Nationality: Zambian

Sport
- Sport: Boxing

Star Zulu is a Zambian boxer. He competed in the men's bantamweight event at the 1984 Summer Olympics.
