= West Germany at the 1984 Summer Olympics =

- Flag of Germany
- IOC code: FRG
- NOC: National Olympic Committee for Germany

in Los Angeles
- Competitors: 390 (267 men, 123 women) in 25 sports
- Flag bearer: Wilhelm Kuhweide (sailing)
- Medals Ranked 3rd: Gold 17 Silver 19 Bronze 23 Total 59

Summer Olympics appearances (overview)
- 1968; 1972; 1976; 1980; 1984; 1988

Other related appearances
- Germany (1896–1936, 1952, 1992–pres.); Saar (1952); United Team of Germany (1956–1964)

West Germany (Federal Republic of Germany) competed at the 1984 Summer Olympics in Los Angeles, United States. West Germany had joined the American-led boycott of the 1980 Summer Olympics four years previously. 390 competitors, 267 men and 123 women, took part in 194 events in 25 sports.

== Medalists ==
Medal	Name	Sport	Event	Date
Gold	Michael Groß	Swimming	Men's 200 metre freestyle	29 July
Gold	Fredy Schmidtke	Cycling	Men's track time trial	30 July
Gold	Michael Groß	Swimming	Men's 100 metre butterfly	30 July
Gold	Karl-Heinz Radschinsky	Weightlifting	Men's 75 kg	2 August
Gold	Claudia Losch	Athletics	Women's shot put	3 August
Gold	Pasquale Passarelli	Wrestling	Men's Greco-Roman 57 kg	3 August
Gold	Michael Dürsch; Albert Hedderich; Raimund Hörmann; Dieter Wiedenmann	Rowing	Men's quadruple sculls	5 August
Gold	Rolf Milser	Weightlifting	Men's 100 kg	6 August
Gold	Sabine Bischoff; Zita Funkenhauser; Cornelia Hanisch; Christiane Weber; Ute Wessel	Fencing	Women's team foil	7 August
Gold	Frank Wieneke	Judo	Men's 78 kg	7 August
Gold	Reiner Klimke; Herbert Krug; Uwe Sauer	Equestrian	Team dressage	9 August
Gold	Reiner Klimke	Equestrian	Individual dressage	10 August
Gold	Ulrike Meyfarth	Athletics	Women's high jump	10 August
Gold	Rolf Danneberg	Athletics	Men's discus throw	10 August
Gold	Ulrich Eicke	Canoeing	Men's C-1 1000 metres	11 August
Gold	Elmar Borrmann; Volker Fischer; Gerhard Heer; Rafael Nickel; Alexander Pusch	Fencing	Men's team épée	11 August
Gold	Dietmar Mögenburg	Athletics	Men's high jump	11 August
Silver	Thomas Fahrner; Michael Groß; Rainer Henkel (*); Dirk Korthals; Alexander Schowtka	Swimming	Men's 4 × 200 metre freestyle relay	30 July
Silver	Rolf Gölz	Cycling	Men's individual pursuit	1 August
Silver	Markus Scherer	Wrestling	Men's Greco-Roman 48 kg	1 August
Silver	Ulrike Holmer	Shooting	Women's 50 metre rifle three positions	2 August
Silver	Matthias Behr	Fencing	Men's foil	2 August
Silver	Uwe Messerschmidt	Cycling	Men's points race	3 August
Silver	Michael Groß	Swimming	Men's 200 metre butterfly	3 August
Silver	Ina Beyermann; Ute Hasse; Svenja Schlicht; Karin Seick	Swimming	Women's 4 × 100 metre medley relay	3 August
Silver	Cornelia Hanisch	Fencing	Women's foil	3 August
Silver	Peter-Michael Kolbe	Rowing	Men's single sculls	5 August
Silver	Frank Beck; Matthias Behr; Mathias Gey; Harald Hein; Klaus Reichert	Fencing	Men's team foil	5 August
Silver	Karl-Hans Riehm	Athletics	Men's hammer throw	6 August
Silver	Joachim Griese; Michael Marcour	Sailing	Star	8 August
Silver	Jürgen Hingsen	Athletics	Men's decathlon	9 August
Silver	Barbara Schüttpelz	Canoeing	Women's K-1 500 metres	10 August
Silver	West Germany women's national field hockey team: Ulla Thielemann; Beate Deininger; Christina Moser; Hella Roth; Dagmar Breiken; Birgit Hagen; Birgit Hahn; Gaby Appel; Andrea Weiermann-Lietz; Corinna Lingnau; Martina Koch; Gabriela Schley; Patricia Ott; Susi Schmid; Sigrid Landgraf; Elke Drüll	Field hockey	Women's tournament	10 August
Silver	Martin Knosp	Wrestling	Men's freestyle 74 kg	10 August
Silver	West Germany men's national field hockey team: Christian Bassemir; Tobias Frank; Ulrich Hänel; Carsten Fischer; Karl-Joachim Hürter; Ekkhard Schmidt-Opper; Felix Krull; Michael Peter; Stefan Blöcher; Andreas Keller; Thomas Reck; Markku Slawyk; Thomas Gunst; Heiner Dopp; Volker Fried; Dirk Brinkmann	Field hockey	Men's tournament	11 August
Silver	West Germany men's national handball team: Andreas Thiel; Arnulf Meffle; Rüdiger Neitzel; Martin Schwalb; Dirk Rauin; Michael Paul; Michael Roth; Thomas Happe; Erhard Wunderlich; Thomas Springel; Klaus Wöller; Jochen Fraatz; Uwe Schwenker; Siegfried Roch; Ulrich Roth	Handball	Men's tournament	11 August
Bronze	Sandra Schumacher	Cycling	Women's individual road race	29 July
Bronze	Petra Zindler	Swimming	Women's 400 metre individual medley	29 July
Bronze	Thomas Fahrner	Swimming	Men's 200 metre freestyle	29 July
Bronze	Christiane Pielke; Susanne Schuster; Karin Seick; Iris Zscherpe	Swimming	Women's 4 × 100 metre freestyle relay	31 July
Bronze	Karin Seick	Swimming	Women's 100 metre butterfly	2 August
Bronze	Claus Erhorn; Dietmar Hogrefe; Bettina Overesch; Burkhard Tesdorpf	Equestrian	Team eventing	3 August
Bronze	Reinhard Alber; Rolf Gölz; Roland Günther; Michael Marx	Cycling	Men's team pursuit	3 August
Bronze	Ellen Becker; Iris Völkner	Rowing	Women's coxless pair	4 August
Bronze	Ina Beyermann	Swimming	Women's 200 metre butterfly	4 August
Bronze	Stefan Pfeiffer	Swimming	Men's 1500 metre freestyle	4 August
Bronze	Sabine Everts	Athletics	Women's heptathlon	4 August
Bronze	Harald Schmid	Athletics	Men's 400 metres hurdles	5 August
Bronze	Klaus Ploghaus	Athletics	Men's hammer throw	6 August
Bronze	Fritz Ligges; Peter Luther; Paul Schockemöhle; Franke Sloothaak	Equestrian	Team jumping	7 August
Bronze	Manfred Nerlinger	Weightlifting	Men's +110 kg	8 August
Bronze	Siegfried Wentz	Athletics	Men's decathlon	9 August
Bronze	Günther Neureuther	Judo	Men's 95 kg	9 August
Bronze	Manfred Zielonka	Boxing	Men's light-middleweight	9 August
Bronze	Josefa Idem; Barbara Schüttpelz	Canoeing	Women's K-2 500 metres	10 August
Bronze	West Germany men's national water polo team: Peter Röhle; Thomas Loebb; Frank Otto; Rainer Hoppe; Armando Fernández; Thomas Huber; Jürgen Schröder; Rainer Osselmann; Hagen Stamm; Roland Freund; Dirk Theismann; Werner Obschernikat	Water polo	Men's tournament	10 August
Bronze	Gaby Bußmann; Heide-Elke Gaugel; Nicole Leistenschneider (*); Heike Schulte-Mattler; Christina Sussiek (*); Ute Thimm	Athletics	Women's 4 × 400 metres relay	11 August
Bronze	Arthur Schnabel	Judo	Men's open category	11 August
Bronze	Regina Weber	Gymnastics	Women's rhythmic individual all-around	11 August

== Archery ==
All five of the German archers posted solid scores in the nation's third Olympic archery competition, with none placing lower than 15th.

Women's Individual Competition:

- Manuela Dachner — 2508 points (→ 6th place)
- Doris Haas — 2480 points (→ 11th place)

Men's Individual Competition:

- Harry Wittig — 2497 points (→ 9th place)
- Armin Garnreiter — 2494 points (→ 10th place)
- Detlef Kahlert — 2486 points (1→ 5th place)

== Athletics ==
Men's Competition

Men's 400 metres

- Erwin Skamrahl

- Heat — 45.94
- Quarterfinals — 46.39 (→ did not advance)

Men's 5000 metres

- Christoph Herle

- Heat — 13:46.35
- Semifinals — did not finish (→ did not advance)

- Uwe Mönkemeyer

- Heat — 13:48.66
- Semifinals — did not finish (→ did not advance)

Men's 10,000 metres

- Christoph Herle

- Qualifying Heat — 28:30.28
- Final — 28:08.21 (→ 5th place)

Men's Marathon

- Ralf Salzmann

- Final — 2:15:29 (→ 18th place)

Men's High Jump

- Dietmar Mögenburg

- Qualification — 2.24 m
- Final — 2.35 m (→ Gold Medal)

- Carlo Thränhardt

- Qualification — 2.24 m
- Final — 2.15 m (→ 10th place)

- Gerd Nagel

- Qualification — 2.18 m (→ did not advance)

Men's Triple Jump

- Peter Bouschen

- Final — 16.77 m (→ 5th place)

Men's Javelin Throw

- Wolfram Gambke

- Qualification — 82.98 m
- Final — 82.46 m (→ 4th place)

- Klaus Tafelmeier

- Qualification — 73.52 m (→ did not advance, 22nd place)

Men's Shot Put

- Karsten Stolz

- Qualifying Round — 18.98 m
- Final — 18.31 m (→ 12th place)

Men's Discus Throw

- Rolf Danneberg

- Final — 66.60 m (→ Gold Medal)

- Alwin Wagner

- Final — 64.72 m (→ 6th place)

Men's Hammer Throw

- Karl-Hans Riehm

- Qualification — 75.50 m
- Final — 77.98 m (→ Silver Medal)

- Klaus Ploghaus

- Qualification — 74.68 m
- Final — 76.68 m (→ Bronze Medal)

- Christoph Sahner

- Qualification — 72.88 m
- Final — no mark (→ no ranking)

Men's Decathlon

- Jürgen Hingsen

- Final Result — 8673 points (→ Silver Medal)

- Siegfried Wentz

- Final Result — 8412 points (→ Bronze Medal)

- Guido Kratschmer

- Final Result — 8326 points (→ 4th place)

Men's 20 km Walk

- Dieter Hoffmann

- Final — did not start (→ no ranking)

Women's Competition

Women's 1000 metres

- Moira Thurnden

- Heat — did not finish (→ no ranking)

Women's 1500 metres

- Roswitha Gerdes

- Heat — 4:10.64
- Final — 4:04.41 (→ 4th place)

- Margrit Klinger

- Heat — did not start (→ no ranking)

Women's 3000 metres

- Brigitte Kraus

- Heat — 8:57.53
- Final — did not finish (→ no ranking)

Women's Marathon

- Charlotte Teske

- Final — 2:35:56 (→ 16th place)

Women's High Jump

- Ulrike Meyfarth

- Qualification — 1.90 m
- Final — 2.02 m (→ Gold Medal)

- Heike Redetzky

- Qualification — 1.90 m
- Final — 1.85 m (→ 11th place)

- Brigitte Holzapfel

- Qualification — 1.90 m
- Final — 1.85 m (→ 11th place)

Women's Discus Throw

- Ingra Manecke

- Qualification — 56.20 m
- Final — 58.56 m (→ 6th place)

Women's Javelin Throw

- Ingrid Thyssen

- Qualification — 60.86 m
- Final — 63.26 m (→ 6th place)

- Beate Peters

- Qualification — 61.56 m
- Final — 62.34 m (→ 7th place)

Women's Shot Put

- Claudia Losch

- Final — 20.48 m (→ Gold Medal)

Women's Heptathlon

- Sabine Everts

- Final Result — 6363 points (→ Bronze Medal)

- Sabine Braun

- Final Result — 6236 points (→ 6th place)

- Birgit Dressel

- Final Result — 6082 points (→ 9th place)

== Basketball ==
Men's Team Competition

- Preliminary Round (Group A)

- Lost to Yugoslavia (83-96)
- Lost to Italy (72-80)
- Lost to Australia (66-66)
- Defeated Egypt (85-58)
- Defeated Brazil (78-75)

- Quarterfinals

- Lost to United States (67-78)

- Classification Matches

- 5th/8th place: Lost to Italy (71-98)
- 7th/8th place: Lost to Australia (76-83) → 8th place

- Team Roster

- Christoph Komer
- Vladimir Kadlec
- Uwe Brauer
- Uwe Sauer
- Ulrich Peters
- Klaus Zander
- Michael Pappert
- Armin Sowa
- Detlef Schrempf
- Uwe Blab
- Ingo Mendel
- Christian Welp

== Boxing ==
Men's Bantamweight (– 54 kg)

- Stefan Gertel (Note: brother of Helmut Gertel, West German light welterweight competitor in the same Games)
  1. First Round — Bye
  2. Second Round — Lost to Louis Gomis (France), retired in the second round

Men's Lightweight (– 60 kg)

- Reiner Gies
  1. First Round — Bye
  2. Second Round — Defeated Samir Khenyab (Iraq), 4:1
  3. Third Round — Defeated John Kalbhenn (Canada), 5:0
  4. Quarterfinals — Lost to Pernell Whitaker (United States), 0:5

Men's Light Welterweight (– 63.5 kg)

- Helmut Gertel (Note: brother of Stefan Gertel, West German bantamweight competitor in the same Games)
  1. First Round — Bye
  2. Second Round — Lost to Jerry Page (United States), 0:5

Men's Welterweight (– 67 kg)

- Alexander Künzler
  1. First Round — Bye
  2. Second Round — Defeated Mohamed Ali Aldahan (Syria), 5:0
  3. Third Round — Defeated Kamel Abboud (Algeria), 4:1
  4. Quarterfinals — Lost to Luciano Bruno (Italy), 0:5

Men's Light Middleweight (– 71 kg)

- Manfred Zielonka → Bronze Medal
  1. First Round — Bye
  2. Second Round — Defeated Ambrose Mlilo (Zimbabwe), 4:1
  3. Third Round — Defeated Gustavo Ollo (Argentina), 5:0
  4. Quarterfinals — Defeated Gnohery Sery (Ivory Coast), 5:0
  5. Semifinals — Lost to Frank Tate (United States), walkover

Men's Middleweight (– 75 kg)

- Andreas Bauer
  1. First Round — Lost to Antonio Corti (Argentina), 0:5

Men's Light Heavyweight (– 81 kg)

- Markus Bott
  1. First Round — Bye
  2. Second Round — Lost to Anton Josipović (Yugoslavia), 1:4

Men's Super Heavyweight (+ 91 kg)

- Peter Hussing
  1. First Round — Defeated Olaf Mayer (Austria), 5:0
  2. Quarterfinals — Lost to Aziz Salihu (Yugoslavia), 2:3

== Cycling ==
Twenty cyclists, sixteen men and four women, represented West Germany in 1984.

Men's individual road race

- Thomas Freienstein
- Achim Stadler
- Werner Stauff
- Andreas Kappes

Team time trial

- Hartmut Bölts
- Thomas Freienstein
- Bernd Gröne
- Michael Maue

Sprint

- Gerhard Scheller
- Fredy Schmidtke

1000 m time trial

- Fredy Schmidtke

Individual pursuit

- Rolf Gölz
- Ingo Wittenborn

Team pursuit

- Reinhard Alber
- Rolf Gölz
- Roland Günther
- Michael Marx

Points race

- Uwe Messerschmidt

- Final — 16 points (→ Silver Medal)

- Manfred Donike

- Final — 3 points (→ 19th place)

Women's individual road race

- Sandra Schumacher — 2:11:14 (→ Bronze Medal)
- Ute Enzenauer — 2:13:28 (→ 8th place)
- Ines Varenkamp — 2:13:28 (→ 12th place)
- Gabriele Altweck

== Diving ==
Men's 3 m Springboard

- Albin Killat

- Preliminary Round — 549.39
- Final — 569.52 (→ 7th place)

- Dieter Dörr

- Preliminary Round — 533.61
- Final — 549.33 (→ 10th place)

== Fencing ==
20 fencers, 15 men and 5 women, represented West Germany in 1984.

Men's foil

- Matthias Behr
- Matthias Gey
- Harald Hein

Men's team foil

- Harald Hein, Matthias Behr, Matthias Gey, Klaus Reichert, Frank Beck

Men's épée

- Elmar Borrmann
- Alexander Pusch
- Volker Fischer

Men's team épée

- Elmar Borrmann, Volker Fischer, Gerhard Heer, Rafael Nickel, Alexander Pusch

Men's sabre

- Freddy Scholz
- Jürgen Nolte
- Jörg Stratmann

Men's team sabre

- Dieter Schneider, Jürgen Nolte, Freddy Scholz, Jörg Stratmann, Jörg Volkmann

Women's foil

- Cornelia Hanisch
- Sabine Bischoff
- Christiane Weber

Women's team foil

- Christiane Weber, Cornelia Hanisch, Sabine Bischoff, Ute Kircheis-Wessel, Zita-Eva Funkenhauser

== Field hockey ==
Men's Team Competition

- Preliminary Round (Group A)

- Defeated Spain (3-1)
- Defeated United States (4-0)
- Lost to Australia (0-3)
- Defeated Malaysia (5-0)
- Drew with India (0-0)

- Semi Finals

- Defeated Great Britain (1-0)

- Final

- Lost to Pakistan (1-2) after extra time → Silver Medal

- Team Roster

- Tobias Frank (gk)
- Christian Bassemir (gk)
- Michael Peter
- Horst-Ulrich Hänel
- Carsten Fischer
- Markku Slawyk
- Thomas Gunst
- Volker Fried
- Eckhard Schmidt-Opper
- Joachim Hürter
- Andreas Keller
- Dirk Brinkmann
- Stefan Blöcher
- Thomas Reck
- Heiner Dopp
- Reinhard Krull

Women's Team Competition

- Round Robin

- Drew with Australia (2-2)
- Defeated Canada (3-0)
- Lost to The Netherlands (2-6)
- Defeated New Zealand (1-0)
- Drew with United States (1-1) → Silver Medal

- Team Roster

- Susanne Schmid (gk)
- Ursula Thielemann (gk)
- Christina Moser
- Hella Roth
- Dagmar Breiken
- Sigrid Landgraf
- Elke Drüll
- Corinna Lingnau
- Andrea Weiermann-Lietz
- Gaby Appel
- Birgit Hagen
- Birgit Hahn
- Beate Deininger
- Patricia Ott
- Martina Koch
- Gabi Schley

== Football ==
Men's Team Competition

- Preliminary Round (Group C)

- West Germany – Morocco 2 – 0
- West Germany – Brazil 0 – 1
- West Germany – Saudi Arabia 4 – 0

- Quarter Finals

- West Germany – Yugoslavia 2 – 5

- Team Roster:

- ( 1.) Bernd Franke
- ( 2.) Manfred Bockenfeld
- ( 3.) Roland Dickgiesser
- ( 4.) Dieter Bast
- ( 5.) Bernd Wehmeyer
- ( 6.) Guido Buchwald
- ( 7.) Jürgen Groh
- ( 8.) Rudi Bommer
- ( 9.) Dieter Schatzschneider
- (10.) Andreas Brehme
- (11.) Frank Mill
- (12.) Walter Junghans
- (13.) Alfred Schoen
- (14.) Peter Lux
- (15.) Uwe Rahn
- (16.) Christian Schreier
- (17.) Dieter Schlindwein

== Handball ==
Men's Team Competition

- Team Roster

- Jochen Fraatz
- Thomas Happe
- Arnulf Meffle
- Rüdiger Neitzel
- Michael Paul
- Dirk Rauin
- Siegfried Roch
- Michael Roth
- Ulrich Roth
- Martin Schwalb
- Uwe Schwenker
- Thomas Springel
- Andreas Thiel
- Klaus Wöller
- Erhard Wunderlich

Women's Team Competition

- Team Roster

- Maike Becker
- Elke Blumauer
- Sabine Erbs
- Astrid Huhn
- Kerstin Jonsson
- Sabrina Koschella
- Corinna Kunze
- Roswitha Mroczynski
- Petra Platen
- Vanadis Putzke
- Silvia Schmitt
- Dagmar Stelberg
- Claudia Sturm

== Modern pentathlon ==
Three male modern pentathletes represented West Germany in 1984.

Individual

- Achim Bellmann
- Michael Rehbein
- Christian Sandow

Team

- Achim Bellmann, Michael Rehbein, Christian Sandow

== Swimming ==
Men's Competition

Men's 100 m Freestyle

- Dirk Korthals

- Heat — 51.02
- Final — 50.93 (→ 8th place)

- Alexander Schowtka

- Heat — 51.78 (→ did not advance, 20th place)

Men's 200 m Freestyle

- Michael Groß

- Heat — 1:48.03
- Final — 1:47.44 (→ Gold Medal)

- Thomas Fahrner

- Heat — 1:50.00
- Final — 1:49.69 (→ Bronze Medal)

Men's 400 m Freestyle

- Stefan Pfeiffer

- Heat — 3:53.41
- Final — 3:52.91 (→ 4th place)

- Thomas Fahrner

- Heat — 3:55.26
- B-Final — 3:50.91 (→ 9th place)

Men's 1500 m Freestyle

- Stefan Pfeiffer

- Heat — 15:21.95
- Final — 15:12.77 (→ Bronze Medal)

- Rainer Henkel

- Heat — 15:23.60
- Final — 15:20.03 (→ 4th place)

Men's 100 m Backstroke

- Stefan Peter

- Heat — 57.90
- B-Final — 58.30 (→ 11th place)

- Nicolai Klapkarek

- Heat — 58.19
- B-Final — 58.56 (→ 15th place)

Men's 200 m Backstroke

- Nicolai Klapkarek

- Heat — 2:04.45
- Final — 2:03.95 (→ 6th place)

- Stefan Peter

- Heat — 2:05.22
- B-Final — 2:05.66 (→ 13th place)

Men's 100 m Breaststroke

- Gerald Mörken

- Heat — 1:03.53
- Final — 1:03.95 (→ 7th place)

- Peter Lang

- Heat — 1:04.40
- B-Final — 1:04.43 (→ 11th place)

Men's 200 m Breaststroke

- Gerald Mörken

- Heat — 2:22.99 (→ did not advance, 18th place)

- Peter Lang

- Heat — 2:24.60 (→ did not advance, 22nd place)

Men's 100 m Butterfly

- Michael Groß

- Heat — 54.02
- Final — 53.08 (→ Gold Medal)

- Andreas Behrend

- Heat — 55.22
- Final — 54.95 (→ 7th place)

Men's 200 m Butterfly

- Michael Groß

- Heat — 1:58.72
- Final — 1:57.40 (→ Silver Medal)

- Andreas Behrend

- Heat — 2:06.06 (→ did not advance, 24th place)

Men's 200 m Individual Medley

- Nicolai Klapkarek

- Heat — 2:06.07
- Final — 2:05.88 (→ 7th place)

- Ralf Diegel

- Heat — 2:06.41
- Final — 2:06.66 (→ 8th place)

Men's 400 m Individual Medley

- Ralf Diegel

- Heat — 4:28.10
- B-Final — 4:28.94 (→ 12th place)

Men's 4 × 100 m Freestyle Relay

- Dirk Korthals, Alexander Schowtka, Nicolai Klapkarek, and Andreas Schmidt

- Heat — 3:24.69

- Dirk Korthals, Andreas Schmidt, Alexander Schowtka, and Michael Groß

- Final — 3:22.98 (→ 4th place)

Men's 4 × 200 m Freestyle Relay

- Rainer Henkel, Dirk Korthals, Alexander Schowtka, and Thomas Fahrner

- Heat — 7:25.29

- Thomas Fahrner, Dirk Korthals, Alexander Schowtka, and Michael Groß

- Final — 7:15.73 (→ Silver Medal)

Men's 4 × 100 m Medley Relay

- Stefan Peter, Gerald Mörken, Andreas Behrend, and Alexander Schowtka

- Heat — 3:49.75

- Stefan Peter, Gerald Mörken, Michael Groß, and Dirk Korthals

- Final — 3:44.26 (→ 4th place)

Women's Competition

Women's 100 m Freestyle

- Susanne Schuster

- Heat — 56.85
- Final — 56.90 (→ 6th place)

- Iris Zscherpe

- Heat — 57.31
- B-Final — 57.19 (→ 9th place)

Women's 200 m Freestyle

- Ina Beyermann

- Heat — 2:02.42
- Final — 2:01.89 (→ 7th place)

- Iris Zscherpe

- Heat — 2:03.95
- B-Final — 2:03.42 (→ 10th place)

Women's 400 m Freestyle

- Birgit Kowalczik

- Heat — 4:17.92
- Final — 4:16.33 (→ 7th place)

- Ina Beyermann

- Heat — 4:18.94
- B-Final — scratched (→ 17th place)

Women's 800 m Freestyle

- Birgit Kowalczik

- Heat — 8:53.34 (→ did not advance, 11th place)

Women's 4 × 100 m Freestyle Relay

- Iris Zscherpe, Susanne Schuster, Christiane Pielke, and Karin Seick

- Heat — 3:46.49
- Final — 3:45.56 (→ Bronze Medal)

Women's 4 × 100 m Medley Relay

- Svenja Schlicht, Ute Hasse, Ina Beyermann, and Karin Seick

- Heat — 4:13.58
- Final — 4:11.97 (→ Silver Medal)

Women's 100 m Backstroke

- Svenja Schlicht

- Heat — 1:04.02
- Final — 1:03.46 (→ 6th place)

- Sandra Dahlmann

- Heat — 1:05.27 (→ did not advance, 17th place)

Women's 200 m Backstroke

- Svenja Schlicht

- Heat — 2:15.69
- Final — 2:15.93 (→ 6th place)

- Sandra Dahlmann

- Heat — 2:19.59
- B-Final — 2:16.93 (→ 9th place)

Women's 200 m Butterfly

- Ina Beyermann

- Heat — 2:13.26
- Final — 2:11.91 (→ Bronze Medal)

- Petra Zindler

- Heat — 2:15.20
- B-Final — 2:16.50 (→ 14th place)

Women's 200 m Individual Medley

- Christiane Pielke

- Heat — 2:19.17
- Final — 2:17.82 (→ 5th place)

- Petra Zindler

- Heat — 2:20.05
- Final — 2:19.86 (→ 7th place)

Women's 400 m Individual Medley

- Petra Zindler

- Heat — 4:52.49
- Final — 4:48.57 (→ Bronze Medal)

== Volleyball ==
Women's Team Competition

- Preliminary Round (Group B)

- Lost to United States (0-3)
- Lost to China (0-3)
- Defeated Brazil (3-0)

- Classification Matches

- 5th/8th place: Defeated Canada (3-0)
- 5th/6th place: Lost to South Korea (0-3) → Sixth place

- Team Roster

- Ruth Holzhausen
- Birgitta Rühmer
- Gudrun Witte
- Beate Bühler
- Regina Vossen
- Sigrid Terstegge
- Andrea Sauvigny
- Renate Riek
- Marina Staden
- Almut Kemperdick
- Terry Place-Brandel
- Ute Hankers

== Water polo ==
Men's Team Competition

- Preliminary Round (Group C)

- Defeated Australia (10-6)
- Defeated Japan (15-8)
- Defeated Italy (10-4)

- Final Round (Group D)

- Drew with Spain (8-8)
- Lost to Yugoslavia (9-10)
- Lost to United States (7-8)
- Defeated Netherlands (15-2) → Bronze Medal

- Team Roster

- Peter Röhle
- Thomas Loebb
- Frank Otto
- Rainer Hoppe
- Armando Fernández
- Thomas Huber
- Jürgen Schroder
- Rainer Osselmann
- Hagen Stamm
- Roland Freund
- Dirk Theismann
- Werner Obschernikat
