= Swimming at the 1984 Summer Olympics – Men's 100 metre backstroke =

Men's 100 metre backstroke at the Games of the XXIII Olympiad
- Venue: McDonald's Olympic Swim Stadium
- Date: 3 August 1984 (heats & final)
- Competitors: 49 from 34 nations
- Winning time: 55.79

Medalists
1st place, gold medalist(s)		Rick Carey	United States
2nd place, silver medalist(s)		Dave Wilson	United States
3rd place, bronze medalist(s)		Mike West	Canada

The final of the men's 100 metre backstroke event at the 1984 Summer Olympics was held in the McDonald's Olympic Swim Stadium in Los Angeles, California, on August 3, 1984.

== Records ==
Prior to this competition, the existing world and Olympic records were as follows.

World record	Rick Carey (USA)	55.19	Caracas, Venezuela	21 August 1983
Olympic record	John Naber (USA)	55.49	Montreal, Canada	19 July 1976

== Results ==
=== Heats ===
Rule: The eight fastest swimmers advance to final A (Q), while the next eight to final B (q).

Rank	Heat	Lane	Name	Nationality	Time	Notes
1	7	4	Rick Carey	United States	55.74	Q
2	6	4	Dave Wilson	United States	56.71	Q
3	2	5	Mark Kerry	Australia	57.15	Q
4	5	5	Gary Hurring	New Zealand	57.42	Q
5	2	4	Hans Kroes	Netherlands	57.48	Q
6	3	4	Sandy Goss	Canada	57.60	Q
7	4	4	Bengt Baron	Sweden	57.66	Q
8	5	4	Mike West	Canada	57.76	Q
9	7	3	Ricardo Aldabe	Spain	57.90	q
9	7	5	Stefan Peter	West Germany	57.90	q
11	4	3	Nicolai Klapkarek	West Germany	58.19	q
12	4	6	Frédéric Delcourt	France	58.22	q
13	4	5	Paul Kingsman	New Zealand	58.33	q
14	1	4	David Orbell	Australia	58.35	q
15	5	3	Daichi Suzuki	Japan	58.37	q
16	6	5	Hans Fredin	Sweden	58.39	q
17	3	5	Neil Harper	Great Britain	58.50	
18	5	2	Paolo Falchini	Italy	58.65	
19	6	3	Ilias Malamas	Greece	58.69	
20	2	3	Kristofer Stivenson	Greece	58.76	
21	4	2	Lukman Niode	Indonesia	58.77	
22	3	6	Patrick Ferland	Switzerland	58.78	
23	5	6	Wang Hao	China	59.13	
24	6	2	Fabrizio Bortolon	Italy	59.27	
25	1	5	Giovanni Frigo	Venezuela	59.34	
26	3	3	Sharif Nour	Egypt	59.63	
27	2	6	Allan Marsh	Jamaica	1:00.04	
28	6	6	Ian Collins	Great Britain	1:00.08	
29	3	2	David Lim Fong Jock	Singapore	1:00.65	
30	7	2	Li Zhongyi	China	1:00.66	
31	7	6	David Morley	Bahamas	1:01.29	
32	4	7	Ernesto Vela	Mexico	1:01.42	
33	3	7	Emad El-Shafei	Egypt	1:02.04	
34	6	7	Fernando Rodríguez	Peru	1:02.27	
35	7	7	Alejandro Alvizuri	Peru	1:02.63	
36	2	7	Hugo Goossen	Suriname	1:03.77	
37	5	7	Erik Rosskopf	Virgin Islands	1:03.82	
38	2	1	Salvador Salguero	El Salvador	1:04.99	
39	1	7	Ernesto-José Degenhart	Guatemala	1:05.63	
40	7	1	Warren Sorby	Fiji	1:05.81	
41	6	1	Collier Woolard	Virgin Islands	1:06.86	
42	5	1	Joaquim Cruz	Mozambique	1:10.86	
43	1	1	David Palma	Honduras	1:13.28	
44	3	1	Ibrahim El-Baba	Lebanon	1:13.76	
	4	1	Rami Kantari	Lebanon	DSQ	
	1	2	Kemal Sadri Özün	Turkey	DNS	
	1	3	Andrew Phillips	Jamaica	DNS	
	1	6	Daniel Mulumba	Uganda	DNS	
	2	2	Alexander Pilhatsch	Austria	DNS	

=== Finals ===
==== Final B ====
Rank	Lane	Name	Nationality	Time	Notes
9	7	David Orbell	Australia	58.05	
10	2	Paul Kingsman	New Zealand	58.19	
11	1	Daichi Suzuki	Japan	58.30	
11	5	Stefan Peter	West Germany	58.30	
13	4	Ricardo Aldabe	Spain	58.31	
13	8	Hans Fredin	Sweden	58.31	
15	3	Nicolai Klapkarek	West Germany	58.56	
	6	Frédéric Delcourt	France	DSQ	

==== Final A ====
Rank	Lane	Name	Nationality	Time	Notes
1st place, gold medalist(s)	4	Rick Carey	United States	55.79	
2nd place, silver medalist(s)	5	Dave Wilson	United States	56.35	
3rd place, bronze medalist(s)	8	Mike West	Canada	56.49	
4	6	Gary Hurring	New Zealand	56.90	NR
5	3	Mark Kerry	Australia	57.18	
6	1	Bengt Baron	Sweden	57.34	
7	7	Sandy Goss	Canada	57.46	
8	2	Hans Kroes	Netherlands	58.07	
