= Swimming at the 1984 Summer Olympics – Men's 200 metre backstroke =

Men's 200 metre backstroke at the Games of the XXIII Olympiad
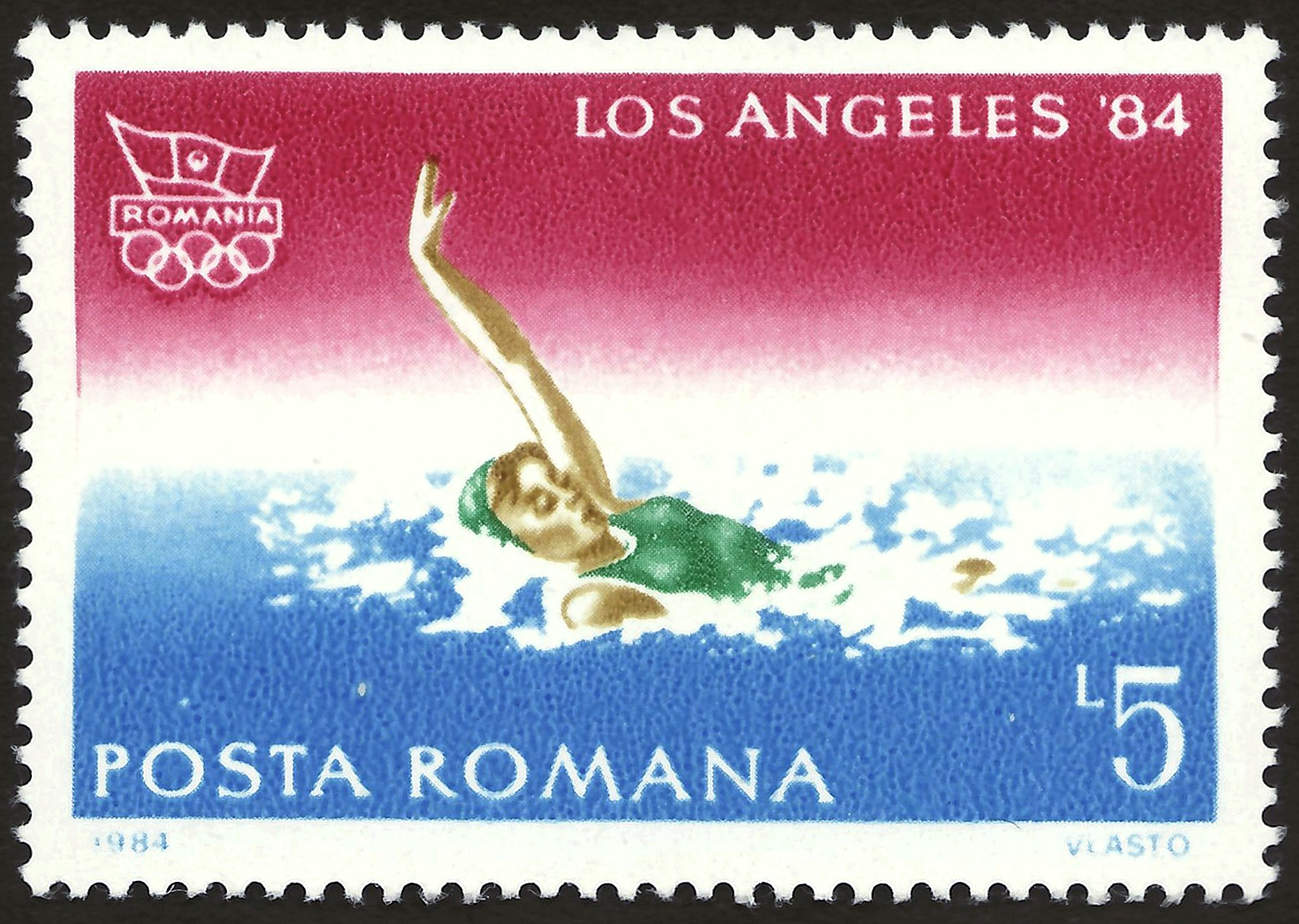
- Romania stamp commemorating 1984 Olympic swimming
- Venue: Uytengsu Aquatics Center
- Date: 31 July 1984 (heats & final)
- Competitors: 34 from 25 nations
- Winning time: 2:00.23

Medalists
1st place, gold medalist(s)		Rick Carey	United States
2nd place, silver medalist(s)		Frédéric Delcourt	France
3rd place, bronze medalist(s)		Cameron Henning	Canada

The men's 200 metre backstroke event at the 1984 Summer Olympics was held in the Uytengsu Aquatics Center in Los Angeles on July 31, 1984. There were 34 competitors from 25 nations, with each nation limited to two swimmers (down from three in previous Games). The event was won by Rick Carey of the United States, the nation's third victory in the men's 200 metre backstroke. Frédéric Delcourt of France took silver and Cameron Henning of Canada earned bronze; it was the first medal in the event for each of those two nations.

Carey won by 1.52 seconds at 2:00.23, an easy victory but a disappointing time for Carey. He did not celebrate and did not smile or acknowledge the crowd during the medal ceremony. His demeanor was heavily criticized, resulting in him issuing an apology.

== Background ==
This was the seventh appearance of the 200 metre backstroke event. It was first held in 1900. The event did not return until 1964; since then, it has been on the programme at every Summer Games. From 1904 to 1960, a men's 100 metre backstroke was held instead. In 1964, only the 200 metres was held. Beginning in 1968 and ever since, both the 100 and 200 metre versions have been held.

One of the 8 finalists from the 1980 returned: sixth-place finisher Michael Söderlund of Sweden. The medalists at the 1982 World Aquatics Championships had been Rick Carey of the United States, Sándor Wladár of Hungary (who was also the 1980 Olympic champion), and Frank Baltrusch of East Germany; with Hungary and East Germany joining the Soviet-led boycott of the Games, only Carey competed in Los Angeles—and was heavily favoured. Carey was also the world record holder, having broken John Naber's record in 1983 and then improved on his own time at the 1984 U.S. Olympic trials.

The Bahamas, the People's Republic of China, Egypt, Greece, Honduras, Indonesia, Jamaica, New Zealand, and Venezuela each made their debut in the event. Australia, Great Britain, and Sweden each made their sixth appearance, matching the Netherlands (absent for the first time) for most among nations to that point.

== Competition format ==
The competition used a two-round (heats and final) format. The advancement rule followed the format introduced in 1952. A swimmer's place in the heat was not used to determine advancement; instead, the fastest times from across all heats in a round were used. A "consolation final" was added in 1984. There were 5 heats of up to 8 swimmers each. The top 8 swimmers advanced to the final. The next 8 (9th through 16th) competed in a consolation final. Swim-offs were used as necessary to break ties.

This swimming event used backstroke. Because an Olympic-size swimming pool is 50 metres long, this race consisted of four lengths of the pool.

== Records ==
Prior to this competition, the existing world and Olympic records were as follows.

World record	Rick Carey (USA)	1:58.86	Indianapolis, United States	27 June 1984
Olympic record	John Naber (USA)	1:59.19	Montreal, Canada	24 July 1976

The following records were established during the competition:

Date	Round	Swimmer	Nation	Time	Record
31 July	Heat 5	Rick Carey	United States	1:58.99	OR

== Schedule ==
All times are Pacific Daylight Time (UTC-7)

Date	Time	Round
Tuesday, 31 July 1984	10:05; 16:55; 17:02	Heats; Final A Final B

== Results ==
=== Heats ===
Rule: The eight fastest swimmers advance to final A, while the next eight to final B.

Rank	Heat	Lane	Swimmer	Nation	Time	Notes
1	5	4	Rick Carey	United States	1:58.99	QA, OR
2	5	5	Frédéric Delcourt	France	2:02.59	QA
3	4	5	Gary Hurring	New Zealand	2:03.29	QA
4	2	4	Cameron Henning	Canada	2:03.36	QA
5	2	2	Ricardo Aldabe	Spain	2:03.94	QA
6	3	5	David Orbell	Australia	2:04.00	QA
7	2	5	Nicolai Klapkarek	West Germany	2:04.45	QA
8	1	4	Ricardo Prado	Brazil	2:04.46	QA
9	3	4	Jesse Vassallo	United States	2:04.51	QB, WD
10	3	3	Paolo Falchini	Italy	2:04.59	QB, NR
11	4	4	Mike West	Canada	2:04.93	QB
12	2	3	Stefan Peter	West Germany	2:05.22	QB
13	2	6	Djan Madruga	Brazil	2:05.23	QB
14	4	6	Neil Cochran	Great Britain	2:05.58	QB
15	4	3	Michael Söderlund	Sweden	2:05.85	QB
16	1	6	Daichi Suzuki	Japan	2:06.24	QB
17	3	6	Fabrizio Bortolon	Italy	2:06.46	QB
18	1	3	Hans Fredin	Sweden	2:06.50	
19	5	3	Kim Terrell	Australia	2:06.56	
20	1	5	Paul Kingsman	New Zealand	2:06.87	
21	3	2	Giovanni Frigo	Venezuela	2:07.56	NR
22	4	2	Patrick Ferland	Switzerland	2:08.31	NR
23	1	2	Kristofer Stivenson	Greece	2:08.38	NR
24	5	6	Neil Harper	Great Britain	2:09.48	
25	5	1	Lukman Niode	Indonesia	2:09.79	
26	4	7	Ernesto Vela	Mexico	2:10.30	
27	3	7	Allan Marsh	Jamaica	2:11.57	
28	5	2	Wang Hao	China	2:12.28	
29	4	1	Emad El-Shafei	Egypt	2:12.90	
30	1	7	Alejandro Alvizuri	Peru	2:13.30	
31	2	7	David Morley	Bahamas	2:18.87	
32	4	8	Salvador Salguero	El Salvador	2:21.75	
33	1	1	Ernesto José Degenhart	Guatemala	2:24.08	
34	3	8	Juan José Piro	Honduras	2:32.48	
—	2	1	Ng Wing Hon	Hong Kong	DNS	
—	3	1	Sharif Nour	Egypt	DNS	
—	5	7	Ilias Malamas	Greece	DNS	
—	5	8	Gordon Petersen	Fiji	DNS	

=== Finals ===
==== Final B ====
Rank	Lane	Swimmer	Nation	Time
9	4	Paolo Falchini	Italy	2:04.64
10	5	Mike West	Canada	2:04.73
11	7	Michael Söderlund	Sweden	2:05.02
12	6	Djan Madruga	Brazil	2:05.33
13	3	Stefan Peter	West Germany	2:05.66
14	2	Neil Cochran	Great Britain	2:05.72
15	8	Fabrizio Bortolon	Italy	2:05.86
16	1	Daichi Suzuki	Japan	2:06.02

==== Final A ====
Rank	Lane	Swimmer	Nation	Time	Notes
1st place, gold medalist(s)	4	Rick Carey	United States	2:00.23	
2nd place, silver medalist(s)	5	Frédéric Delcourt	France	2:01.75	NR
3rd place, bronze medalist(s)	6	Cameron Henning	Canada	2:02.37	
4	8	Ricardo Prado	Brazil	2:03.05	
5	3	Gary Hurring	New Zealand	2:03.10	NR
6	1	Nicolai Klapkarek	West Germany	2:03.95	
7	2	Ricardo Aldabe	Spain	2:04.53	
8	7	David Orbell	Australia	2:04.67	
