= Water polo at the 1982 World Aquatics Championships – Men's tournament =

Tournament details
- Venue: Ecuador (in Guayaquil host cities)
- Dates: 20 July – 8 August
- Teams: 16 (from 5 confederations)

Final positions
- Champions: Soviet Union (2nd title)
- Runners-up: Hungary
- Third place: West Germany
- Fourth place: Netherlands

Tournament statistics
- Matches played: 56
- Goals scored: 981 (17.52 per match)

The 1982 Men's World Water Polo Championship was the fourth edition of the men's water polo tournament at the World Aquatics Championships, organised by the world governing body in aquatics, the FINA. The tournament was held from 29 July to 8 August 1982, and was incorporated into the 1982 World Aquatics Championships in Guayaquil, Ecuador.

== Participating teams ==
Africa	Americas	Asia	Europe	Oceania
Egypt	Canada; Cuba; United States	China	France; Greece; Hungary; Italy; Netherlands; Soviet Union; Spain; West Germany; Yugoslavia	Australia; New Zealand

=== Groups formed ===
Group A

- Italy
- New Zealand
- Spain
- West Germany

Group B

- Australia
- Egypt
- Soviet Union
- United States

Group C

- China
- Cuba
- Greece
- Hungary

Group D

- Canada
- France
- Netherlands
- Yugoslavia

== First round ==
Qualified for places 1–8, separated in 2 round robin groups of 4 teams each. (Group E and F)
Qualified for places 9–16, separated in 2 round robin groups of 4 teams each. (Group G and H)

=== Group A ===
Pos	Team	Pts	Pld	W	D	L	GF	GA	GD
1	West Germany	6	3	3	0	0	33	19	+14
2	Spain	4	3	2	0	1	36	18	+18
3	Italy	2	3	1	0	2	36	23	+13
4	New Zealand	0	3	0	0	3	12	57	−45

- 29 July 1982

West Germany	9 – 8	Italy
Spain	21 – 2	New Zealand

- 30 July 1982

West Germany	8 – 6	Spain
Italy	20 – 5	New Zealand

- 31 July 1982

West Germany	16 – 5	New Zealand
Spain	9 – 8	Italy

=== Group B ===
Pos	Team	Pts	Pld	W	D	L	GF	GA	GD
1	Soviet Union	6	3	3	0	0	35	14	+21
2	United States	4	3	2	0	1	36	15	+21
3	Australia	2	3	1	0	2	36	20	+16
4	Egypt	0	3	0	0	3	5	63	−58

- 29 July 1982

United States	24 – 2	Egypt
Soviet Union	11 – 8	Australia

- 30 July 1982

Soviet Union	8 – 5	United States
Australia	23 – 2	Egypt

- 31 July 1982

Soviet Union	16 – 1	Egypt
United States	7 – 5	Australia

=== Group C ===
Pos	Team	Pts	Pld	W	D	L	GF	GA	GD
1	Hungary	6	3	3	0	0	38	19	+19
2	Cuba	4	3	2	0	1	28	23	+5
3	China	2	3	1	0	2	26	35	−9
4	Greece	0	3	0	0	3	20	35	−15

- 29 July 1982

Cuba	9 – 5	Greece
Hungary	14 – 6	China

- 30 July 1982

Hungary	14 – 5	Greece
Cuba	11 – 8	China

- 31 July 1982

Hungary	10 – 8	Cuba
China	12 – 10	Greece

=== Group D ===
Pos	Team	Pts	Pld	W	D	L	GF	GA	GD
1	Yugoslavia	6	3	3	0	0	33	26	+7
2	Netherlands	4	3	2	0	1	26	17	+9
3	France	2	3	1	0	2	26	36	−10
4	Canada	0	3	0	0	3	27	33	−6

- 29 July 1982

Yugoslavia	13 – 9	France
Netherlands	8 – 5	Canada

- 30 July 1982

Yugoslavia	7 – 6	Netherlands
France	12 – 11	Canada

- 31 July 1982

Yugoslavia	13 – 11	Canada
Netherlands	12 – 5	France

== Second round ==
Qualified for places 1–4 in a round robin group. (Group L)
Will play for places 5–8 in a round robin group. (Group I)
Will play for places 9–12 in a round robin group. (Group J)
Will play for places 13–16 in a round robin group (Group K)

=== Group E ===
Pos	Team	Pts	Pld	W	D	L	GF	GA	GD
1	Soviet Union	6	3	3	0	0	27	20	+7
2	West Germany	4	3	2	0	1	24	24	0
3	United States	2	3	1	0	2	21	21	0
4	Spain	0	3	0	0	3	18	25	−7

First round results apply.

- 3 August 1982

West Germany	8 – 7	United States
Soviet Union	8 – 7	Spain

- 4 August 1982

United States	9 – 5	Spain
Soviet Union	11 – 8	West Germany

=== Group F ===
Pos	Team	Pts	Pld	W	D	L	GF	GA	GD
1	Hungary	6	3	3	0	0	28	24	+4
2	Netherlands	2	3	1	0	2	21	21	0
3	Yugoslavia	2	3	1	0	2	25	26	−1
4	Cuba	2	3	1	0	2	24	27	−3

First round results apply.

- 3 August 1982

Netherlands	9 – 7	Cuba
Hungary	11 – 10	Yugoslavia

- 4 August 1982

Hungary	7 – 6	Netherlands
Cuba	9 – 8	Yugoslavia

=== Group G ===
Pos	Team	Pts	Pld	W	D	L	GF	GA	GD
1	Italy	6	3	3	0	0	46	18	+28
2	Australia	4	3	2	0	1	46	14	+32
3	Egypt	2	3	1	0	2	16	46	−30
4	New Zealand	0	3	0	0	3	14	44	−30

First round results apply.

- 3 August 1982

Italy	16 – 4	Egypt
Australia	14 – 2	New Zealand

- 4 August 1982

Italy	10 – 9	Australia
Egypt	10 – 7	New Zealand

=== Group H ===
Pos	Team	Pts	Pld	W	D	L	GF	GA	GD
1	China	4	3	2	0	1	35	32	+3
2	Greece	3	3	1	1	1	28	27	+1
3	France	3	3	1	1	1	31	34	−3
4	Canada	2	3	1	0	2	29	30	−1

First round results apply.

- 3 August 1982

Canada	12 – 9	China
Greece	9 – 9	France

- 4 August 1982

Greece	9 – 6	Canada
China	14 – 10	France

== Final round ==
=== 13th – 16th places (Group K) ===
Pos	Team	Pts	Pld	W	D	L	GF	GA	GD
13	France	5	3	2	1	0	31	22	+9
14	Canada	4	3	2	0	1	38	26	+12
15	Egypt	2	3	1	0	2	19	38	−19
16	New Zealand	1	3	0	1	2	20	25	−5

Results of previous rounds apply.

- 6 August 1982

France	6 – 6	New Zealand
Canada	18 – 4	Egypt

- 7 August 1982

France	13 – 5	Egypt
Canada	9 – 7	New Zealand

=== 9th – 12th places (Group J) ===
Pos	Team	Pts	Pld	W	D	L	GF	GA	GD
9	Italy	6	3	3	0	0	34	25	+9
10	China	4	3	2	0	1	31	31	0
11	Australia	2	3	1	0	2	25	27	−2
12	Greece	0	3	0	0	3	24	31	−7

Results of previous rounds apply.

- 6 August 1982

China	9 – 7	Australia
Italy	10 – 6	Greece

- 7 August 1982

Italy	14 – 10	China
Australia	9 – 8	Greece

=== 5th – 8th places (Group I) ===
Pos	Team	Pts	Pld	W	D	L	GF	GA	GD
5	Cuba	4	3	2	0	1	25	23	+2
6	United States	4	3	2	0	1	24	21	+3
7	Yugoslavia	2	3	1	0	2	22	23	−1
8	Spain	2	3	1	0	2	19	23	−4

Results of previous rounds apply.

- 6 August 1982

Cuba	9 – 7	United States
Yugoslavia	7 – 6	Spain

- 7 August 1982

Spain	8 – 7	Cuba
United States	8 – 7	Yugoslavia

=== 1st - 4th places Final standings (Group L) ===
Pos	Team	Pts	Pld	W	D	L	GF	GA	GD
1	Soviet Union	5	3	2	1	0	25	20	+5
2	Hungary	4	3	1	2	0	21	20	+1
3	West Germany	3	3	1	1	1	20	21	−1
4	Netherlands	0	3	0	0	3	14	19	−5

Results of previous rounds apply.

- 6 August 1982

Soviet Union	7 – 5	Netherlands
Hungary	7 – 7	West Germany

- 7 August 1982

West Germany	5 – 3	Netherlands
Soviet Union	7 – 7	Hungary

== Final ranking ==
RANK	TEAM
1st place, gold medalist(s)	Soviet Union
2nd place, silver medalist(s)	Hungary
3rd place, bronze medalist(s)	West Germany
4.	Netherlands
5.	Cuba
6.	United States
7.	Yugoslavia
8.	Spain
9.	Italy
10.	China
11.	Australia
12.	Greece
13.	France
14.	Canada
15.	Egypt
16.	New Zealand

1982 FINA Men's World champions

Soviet Union
Second title

Team Roster

Vladimir Akimov, Mikhail Ivanov, Aleksandr Kabanov, Alexander Kleymenov, Sergei Kotenko, Nurlan Mendigaliev, Georgy Mshevenieradze, Erkin Shagaev, Yevgeny Sharonov, Nicola Smirnov, Aleksei Vdovin
Head coach: Boris Popov

== Medalists ==
Gold	Silver	Bronze
Soviet Union Vladimir Akimov; Mikheil Giorgadze; Yevgeny Grishin; Mikhail Ivanov; Aleksandr Kabanov; Alexander Kleymenov; Sergey Kotenko; Nurlan Mendygaliyev; Giorgi Mshvenieradze; Erkin Shagaev; Yevgeny Sharonov; Nikolai Smirnov; Aleksey Vdovin Head coach: Boris Popov	Hungary László Bors; Imre Budavári; Gábor Csapó; Tibor Cservenyák; György Gerendás; György Horkai; György Kenéz; István Kiss; László Kuncz; Gábor Schmiedt; Attila Sudár; Sándor Tóth; János Varga Head coach: Mihály Mayer	West Germany Frank Blümlein; Roland Freund; Rainer Hoppe; Günter Kilian; Thomas Loebb; Ralf Obschernikat; Werner Obschernikat; Rainer Osselmann; Frank Otto; Peter Röhle; Jürgen Schröder; Hagen Stamm; Bernd Weyer Head coach: Nicolae Firoiu
