= Swimming at the 1984 Summer Olympics – Men's 100 metre butterfly =

Men's 100 metre butterfly at the Games of the XXIII Olympiad
- Venue: McDonald's Olympic Swim Stadium
- Date: 30 July 1984 (heats & final)
- Competitors: 53 from 39 nations
- Winning time: 53.08 WR

Medalists
1st place, gold medalist(s)		Michael Gross	West Germany
2nd place, silver medalist(s)		Pablo Morales	United States
3rd place, bronze medalist(s)		Glenn Buchanan	Australia

The final of the men's 100 metre butterfly event at the 1984 Summer Olympics was held in the McDonald's Olympic Swim Stadium in Los Angeles, California, on July 30, 1984.

== Records ==
Prior to this competition, the existing world and Olympic records were as follows.

World record	Pablo Morales (USA)	53.38	Indianapolis, United States	26 June 1984
Olympic record	Mark Spitz (USA)	54.27	Munich, West Germany	31 August 1972

The following records were established during the competition:

Date	Round	Name	Nation	Time	Record
30 July	Heat 7	Pablo Morales	United States	53.78	OR
30 July	Final A	Michael Gross	West Germany	53.08	WR

== Results ==
=== Heats ===
Rule: The eight fastest swimmers advance to final A (Q), while the next eight to final B (q).

Rank	Heat	Lane	Name	Nationality	Time	Notes
1	7	4	Pablo Morales	United States	53.78	Q, OR
2	6	4	Michael Gross	West Germany	54.02	Q, ER
3	2	4	Rafael Vidal	Venezuela	54.33	Q, NR
4	4	5	Andy Jameson	Great Britain	54.59	Q, NR
5	5	5	Bengt Baron	Sweden	54.67	Q
6	1	5	Glenn Buchanan	Australia	54.86	Q, OC
7	7	6	Anthony Mosse	New Zealand	55.19	Q, NR
8	3	5	Andreas Behrend	West Germany	55.22	Q
9	4	4	Tom Ponting	Canada	55.23	q
10	1	3	Dano Halsall	Switzerland	55.35	q
11	5	4	Matt Gribble	United States	55.39	q, WD
12	3	6	Kristofer Stivenson	Greece	55.46	q, NR
12	5	3	Cees Vervoorn	Netherlands	55.46	q
14	1	4	David López-Zubero	Spain	55.66	q
15	2	5	Fabrizio Rampazzo	Italy	55.70	q
15	7	3	Mark Stockwell	Australia	55.70	q, WD
17	6	5	Søren Østberg	Denmark	55.73	q
18	6	3	Théophile David	Switzerland	55.81	q
19	7	5	David Churchill	Canada	55.84	
20	2	6	Harri Garmendia	Spain	55.97	
21	3	2	Anthony Nesty	Suriname	56.15	NR
22	4	6	Taihei Saka	Japan	56.40	
23	6	6	Ian Collins	Great Britain	56.41	
24	5	6	Shudo Kawawa	Japan	56.52	
25	1	6	İhsan Sabri Özün	Turkey	56.55	NR
25	3	2	Gérard de Kort	Netherlands	56.55	
27	6	2	Zheng Jian	China	56.58	
28	4	3	Ang Peng Siong	Singapore	56.61	NR
29	3	4	Filiberto Colon	Puerto Rico	56.66	
30	2	3	Hrvoje Barić	Yugoslavia	56.70	
31	7	7	Luis Juncos	Argentina	56.86	NR
32	7	2	Carlos Scanavino	Uruguay	57.46	
33	6	7	Carlos Romo	Mexico	57.61	
34	4	2	Allan Marsh	Jamaica	57.69	
35	5	7	Ahmed Said	Egypt	57.71	
36	5	2	Kemal Sadri Özün	Turkey	57.75	
37	4	7	João Santos	Portugal	58.17	
38	1	2	Tsang Yi Ming	Hong Kong	58.25	
39	2	2	Sean Nottage	Bahamas	58.73	
40	3	7	Bang Jun-young	South Korea	58.91	
41	2	7	Ahmed Eid	Egypt	58.95	
42	1	7	Deryck Marks	Jamaica	1:00.57	
43	7	1	Ingi Jónsson	Iceland	1:00.68	
44	3	1	Faisal Marzouk	Kuwait	1:02.00	
45	6	1	Roberto Granados	Guatemala	1:02.32	
46	5	8	Juan Miranda	El Salvador	1:04.33	
47	4	1	Ibrahim El-Baba	Lebanon	1:04.48	
48	1	1	Adel Al-Ghaith	Kuwait	1:04.62	
49	5	1	Warren Sorby	Fiji	1:05.53	
50	4	8	Salvador Corelo	Honduras	1:05.91	
51	7	8	Trevor Ncala	Swaziland	1:06.94	
52	2	1	Samuela Tupou	Fiji	1:07.75	
53	6	8	Esa Fadel	Bahrain	1:13.27	

=== Finals ===
==== Final B ====
Rank	Lane	Name	Nationality	Time	Notes
9	4	Tom Ponting	Canada	55.31	
10	8	Théophile David	Switzerland	55.40	
11	5	Dano Halsall	Switzerland	55.51	
12	3	David López-Zubero	Spain	55.61	
12	6	Kristofer Stivenson	Greece	55.61	
14	2	Cees Vervoorn	Netherlands	55.75	
15	1	Søren Østberg	Denmark	56.04	
	7	Fabrizio Rampazzo	Italy	DNS	

==== Final A ====
Rank	Lane	Name	Nationality	Time	Notes
1st place, gold medalist(s)	5	Michael Gross	West Germany	53.08	WR
2nd place, silver medalist(s)	4	Pablo Morales	United States	53.23	AM
3rd place, bronze medalist(s)	7	Glenn Buchanan	Australia	53.85	OC
4	3	Rafael Vidal	Venezuela	54.27	NR
5	6	Andy Jameson	Great Britain	54.28	NR
6	1	Anthony Mosse	New Zealand	54.93	NR
7	8	Andreas Behrend	West Germany	54.95	
8	2	Bengt Baron	Sweden	55.14	
