= Germany men's national water polo team =

Men's national water polo team representing Germany

Germany
- FINA code: GER
- Association: Deutscher Schwimm-Verband
- Confederation: LEN (Europe)
- Head coach: Petar Porobić
- Asst coach: Peter Röhle; Milos Sekulic
- Captain: Moritz Schenkel

FINA ranking (since 2008)
- Current: 13 (as of 3 Juli 2022)
- Highest: 7 (2009)

Olympic Games (team statistics)
- Appearances: 17 (first in 1900)
- Best result: (gold) (1928)

World Championship
- Appearances: 16 (first in 1973)
- Best result: (bronze) (1982)

World Cup
- Appearances: 10 (first in 1979)
- Best result: (gold) (1985)

World League
- Appearances: 2 (first in 2005)
- Best result: (bronze) (2005)

European Championship
- Appearances: 31 (first in 1926)
- Best result: (gold) (1981, 1989)

Media
- Website: dsv.de/wasserball
Medal record
Men's water polo
Olympic Games
Gold medal – first place	1928 Amsterdam	Team
Silver medal – second place	1932 Los Angeles	Team
Silver medal – second place	1936 Berlin	Team
Bronze medal – third place	1984 Los Angeles	Team
World Championship
Bronze medal – third place	1982 Guayaquil	Team
World Cup
Gold medal – first place	1985 Duisburg
Silver medal – second place	1983 Malibu
Bronze medal – third place	1987 Thessalonica
World League
Bronze medal – third place	2005 Belgrade
European Championship
Gold medal – first place	1981 Split
Gold medal – first place	1989 Bonn
Silver medal – second place	1931 Paris
Silver medal – second place	1934 Magdeburg
Silver medal – second place	1938 London
Bronze medal – third place	1926 Budapest
Bronze medal – third place	1985 Sofia
Bronze medal – third place	1995 Vienna

The Germany national water polo team represents Germany in international men's water polo competitions and friendly matches. It is controlled by German Swimming Federation.

Germany has won several medals in international competitions, including one Olympic gold and one World Cup, as well as 1982 World Championship bronze medal. The team was named Germany's Sportsteam of the Year in 1981.

== Results ==
=== Olympic Games ===
Year	Position
as Germany
(France) 1900	First round
(United Kingdom) 1908	Didn't participate
(Sweden) 1912	Didn't participate
(Belgium) 1920	Didn't participate
(France) 1924	Didn't participate
(Netherlands) 1928	1st place, gold medalist(s)
(United States) 1932	2nd place, silver medalist(s)
(Nazi Germany) 1936	2nd place, silver medalist(s)
(United Kingdom) 1948	Didn't participate
(Finland) 1952	15th
as United Team of Germany
(Australia) 1956	6th
(Italy) 1960	6th
(Japan) 1964	6th (Note: East Germany won the play-off and represented the United Team of Germany in 1964)
as West Germany
(Mexico) 1968	10th
(West Germany) 1972	4th
(Canada) 1976	6th
(Soviet Union) 1980	Didn't participate
(United States) 1984	3rd place, bronze medalist(s)
(South Korea) 1988	4th
as Germany
(Spain) 1992	7th
(United States) 1996	9th
(Australia) 2000	Didn't qualify
(Greece) 2004	5th
(China) 2008	10th
(United Kingdom) 2012	Didn't qualify
(Brazil) 2016	Didn't qualify
(Japan) 2020	Didn't qualify
(France) 2024	Didn't qualify
Total	17/28

=== World Championship ===
Year	Position
as West Germany
(Socialist Federal Republic of Yugoslavia) 1973	11th
(Colombia) 1975	6th
(West Germany) 1978	7th
(Ecuador) 1982	3rd place, bronze medalist(s)
(Spain) 1986	6th
as Germany
(Australia) 1991	5th
(Italy) 1994	9th
(Australia) 1998	Didn't qualify
(Japan) 2001	14th
(Spain) 2003	11th
(Canada) 2005	9th
(Australia) 2007	8th
(Italy) 2009	6th
(China) 2011	8th
(Spain) 2013	10th
(Russia) 2015	Didn't qualify
(Hungary) 2017	Didn't qualify
(South Korea) 2019	8th
(Hungary) 2022	13th
(Japan) 2023	Didn't qualify
(Qatar) 2024	Didn't qualify
(Singapore) 2025	Didn't qualify
Total	16/22

=== FINA World Cup ===
Year	Position
as West Germany
(Socialist Federal Republic of Yugoslavia) 1979	5th
(United States) 1981	Didn't qualify
(United States) 1983	2nd place, silver medalist(s)
(West Germany) 1985	1st place, gold medalist(s)
(Greece) 1987	3rd place, bronze medalist(s)
(West Germany) 1989	5th
as Germany
(Spain) 1991	8th
(Greece) 1993	6th
(United States) 1995	Didn't participate
(Greece) 1997	Didn't participate
(Australia) 1999	Didn't participate
(Serbia and Montenegro) 2002	Didn't participate
(Hungary) 2006	Didn't participate
(Romania) 2010	Didn't participate
(Kazakhstan) 2014	Didn't participate
(Germany) 2018	4th
(United States) 2023	8th
(Montenegro) 2025	7th
Total	10/18

=== FINA World League ===
Year	Position
(Greece) 2002	Didn't participate
(United States) 2003	Didn't participate
(United States) 2004	Didn't participate
(Serbia and Montenegro) 2005	3rd place, bronze medalist(s)
(Greece) 2006	Semifinal round
(Germany) 2007	4th
(Italy) 2008	Didn't participate
(Montenegro) 2009	Preliminary round
(Serbia) 2010	Preliminary round
(Italy) 2011	Preliminary round
(Kazakhstan) 2012	Preliminary round
(Russia) 2013	Preliminary round
(United Arab Emirates) 2014	Preliminary round
(Italy) 2015	Preliminary round
(China) 2016	Didn't participate
(Russia) 2017	Preliminary round
(Hungary) 2018	Preliminary round
(Serbia) 2019	Preliminary round
(Georgia (country)) 2020	Didn't participate
(France) 2022	First round
Total	14/20

=== European Championship ===
- As Germany
  - 1926 – (bronze) Bronze medal
  - 1927 – 5th place
  - 1931 – (silver) Silver medal
  - 1934 – (silver) Silver medal
  - 1938 – (silver) Silver medal
- As West Germany
  - 1954 – 6th place
  - 1958 – 7th place
  - 1966 – 7th place
  - 1970 – 7th place
  - 1974 – 8th place
  - 1977 – 6th place
  - 1981 – (gold) Gold medal
  - 1983 – 5th place
  - 1985 – (bronze) Bronze medal
  - 1987 – 4th place
  - 1989 – (gold) Gold medal
- As Germany
  - 1991 – 7th place
  - 1993 – 9th place
  - 1995 – (bronze) Bronze medal
  - 1997 – 10th place
  - 1999 – 8th place
  - 2001 – 9th place
  - 2003 – 5th place
  - 2006 – 8th place
  - 2008 – 6th place
  - 2010 – 6th place
  - 2012 – 5th place
  - 2014 – 9th place
  - 2016 – 11th place
  - 2018 – 9th place
  - 2020 – 9th place
  - 2022 – 13th place
  - 2024 – 12th place
  - 2026 – did not participate

== Current squad ==
Roster for the 2020 Men's European Water Polo Championship.

Head coach: Hagen Stamm

No	Name	Pos.	L/R	Date of birth	Height	Weight	Caps	Club
1	Moritz Schenkel	GK	R	4 September 1990 (age 35)	2.03 m (6 ft 8 in)	104 kg (229 lb)	120	(Germany) Waspo Hannover
2	Ben Reibel	AR	R	27 August 1997 (age 28)	2.07 m (6 ft 9 in)	97 kg (214 lb)	15	(Germany) Spandau 04
3	Timo van der Bosch	W	R	29 November 1993 (age 32)	1.94 m (6 ft 4 in)	102 kg (225 lb)	95	(Germany) SV Ludwigsburg 08
4	Julian Real (C)	DF	R	22 December 1989 (age 36)	2.00 m (6 ft 7 in)	110 kg (240 lb)	260	(Germany) Waspo Hannover
5	Hannes Schulz	W	R	25 May 1990 (age 35)	1.87 m (6 ft 2 in)	91 kg (201 lb)	70	(Germany) OSC Potsdam
6	Maurice Jüngling	AR	R	6 October 1991 (age 34)	1.84 m (6 ft 0 in)	87 kg (192 lb)	140	(Germany) Spandau 04
7	Dennis Strelezkij	W	R	22 April 1998 (age 27)	1.86 m (6 ft 1 in)	98 kg (216 lb)	50	(Germany) Spandau 04
8	Lucas Gielen	DF	R	26 November 1990 (age 35)	2.04 m (6 ft 8 in)	106 kg (234 lb)	220	(Germany) Spandau 04
9	Marko Stamm	AR	R	30 August 1988 (age 37)	1.87 m (6 ft 2 in)	98 kg (216 lb)	265	(Germany) Spandau 04
10	Mateo Ćuk	CB	R	21 February 1990 (age 36)	1.96 m (6 ft 5 in)	108 kg (238 lb)	75	(Germany) Spandau 04
11	Marin Restović	W	L	22 July 1990 (age 35)	1.92 m (6 ft 4 in)	96 kg (212 lb)	105	(Germany) Spandau 04
12	Dennis Eidner	CF	R	4 August 1989 (age 36)	1.80 m (5 ft 11 in)	112 kg (247 lb)	200	(Germany) ASC Duisburg
13	Kevin Götz	GK	R	3 February 1993 (age 33)	1.90 m (6 ft 3 in)	84 kg (185 lb)	79	(Germany) Waspo Hannover

== Player statistics and records ==
=== Most appearances ===
Name	Matches	Years
Frank Otto	467	1977-1992
Peter Röhle	414	1976-?
Marc Politze	407	1997-2013
René Reimann	394	
Hagen Stamm	323	
(Russia) (Germany) Alexander Tchigir	300+	1997/98-?
(Kazakhstan) (Germany) Thomas Schertwitis	272+	1998-?
Günter Kilian	200+	1968-?
Dirk Klingenberg	190	
Guido Reibel	144	1988-1994
Roland Freund		1975-1985
Thomas Loebb		1975-?
Dirk Theismann		1983-?
Wolf-Rüdiger Schulz		1960-1968

=== Top scorers ===
Name	Goals	Years
Hagen Stamm	750+	

== Notable former coaches ==
- (Romania) Nico Firoiu (1975–88, 1993–97)

== See also ==
- East Germany national water polo team
- Germany men's Olympic water polo team records and statistics
- List of Olympic champions in men's water polo
- List of men's Olympic water polo tournament records and statistics
