= 1987 Sultan Azlan Shah Cup =

Field hockey tournament

Tournament details
- Host country: Malaysia
- City: Ipoh
- Teams: 6
- Venue: Azlan Shah Stadium

Final positions
- Champions: West Germany (1st title)
- Runner-up: Pakistan
- Third place: Great Britain

Tournament statistics
- Matches played: 10
- Goals scored: 44 (4.4 per match)
- Top scorer: (United Kingdom) Martyn Grimley (6 goals)
- Best player: (Pakistan) Hassan Sardar

The 1987 Sultan Azlan Shah Cup was the third edition of invitational field hockey tournament the Sultan Azlan Shah Cup held in Malaysia at the Azlan Shah Stadium in Ipoh. West Germany won the title defeating Pakistan 3-2 in the final after a goal by Andreas Keller in extra-time. Hassan Sardar of Pakistan was voted as Lucky Star Player of the Tournament for his all-round performances

== Participating nations ==
Six countries participated in the 1987 tournament:

- Great Britain
- Malaysia
- Pakistan
- West Germany
- South Korea
- Japan

== Results ==
=== Preliminary round ===
==== Pool A ====
Pos	Team	Pld	W	D	L	GF	GA	GD	Pts	Qualification
1	Malaysia	2	1	1	0	3	1	+2	3	Semifinals
2	Great Britain	2	1	1	0	3	1	+2	3	Semifinals
3	Japan	2	0	0	2	2	6	-4	0	

Rules for classification: 1) points; 2) goal difference; 3) goals scored; 4) head-to-head result.

==== Fixtures ====
14 April 1987
15:00

Malaysia	3 – 1	Japan
Jagjit 13'; Zaini 21'; Embaraj 64'	Report	Nagal 54'

15 April 1987
15:00

Japan	1 – 3	Great Britain
Maeda 61'	Report	Grimley 18', 27', 30'

16 April 1987
15:00

Great Britain	0 – 0	Malaysia
	Report

Note: Penalty shootout was held to determine the group winner. Malaysia won 8–9

==== Pool B ====
Pos	Team	Pld	W	D	L	GF	GA	GD	Pts	Qualification
1	Pakistan	2	2	0	0	9	4	+6	4	Semifinals
2	West Germany	2	1	0	1	5	5	0	2	Semifinals
3	South Korea	2	0	0	2	3	8	-5	0	

Rules for classification: 1) points; 2) goal difference; 3) goals scored; 4) head-to-head result.

==== Fixtures ====
14 April 1987
17:00

West Germany	3 – 1	South Korea
Hürter 8'; Brandenstein 11'; Knapp 14'	Report	Man-hoe 47'

15 April 1987
17:00

Pakistan	4 – 2	West Germany
Shahbaz 13'; Sardar 26'; Mohib 44'; Mushtaq 58'	Report	Saliger 11'; Dopp 56'

16 April 1987
17:00

South Korea	2 – 5	Pakistan
Man-hoe 35', 49'	Report	Mohib 9'; Feroz 14'; Akhtar 19'; Mushtaq 34'; Farhat 53'

=== Classification round ===
==== Semifinals ====
18 April 1987
15:00

Malaysia	1 – 1 (a.e.t.)	West Germany
Embaraj 90'	Report	Mayer 84'
Penalties
	6 - 7

18 April 1987
17:00

Pakistan	1 – 0	Great Britain
Mohib 10'	Report; Match abandoned due to rain

Replay

19 April 1987
15:00

Pakistan	4 – 3 (a.e.t.)	Great Britain
Mohib 10', 59'; Sardar 72', 81'	Report	Grimley 35'; Potter 70', 74'

==== Third and fourth place ====
20 April 1987
15:00

Malaysia	1 – 4	Great Britain
Jagjit 41'	Report	Grimley 37', 49'; Fualkner 50'; Potter 59'

=== Final ===
20 April 1987
17:00

West Germany	3 – 2 (a.e.t.)	Pakistan
Knapp 2'; Dopp 32'; Keller 86'	Report	Sardar 10'; Farhat 19'

== Statistics ==
=== Final standings ===
Pos	Team	Pld	W	D	L	GF	GA	GD	Result
1st place, gold medalist(s)	West Germany	4	3	0	1	9	8	+1	champions
2nd place, silver medalist(s)	Pakistan	4	3	0	1	15	10	+5	runner-up
3rd place, bronze medalist(s)	Great Britain	4	2	1	1	10	6	+4	Third place
4	Malaysia	4	1	1	2	5	6	-1	
5	Japan	2	0	0	2	2	6	-4	
6	South Korea	2	0	0	2	3	8	-5	

=== Goalscorers ===
6 goals

- (United Kingdom) Martyn Grimley

4 goals

- (Pakistan) Hassan Sardar
- (Pakistan) Qazi Mohib

3 goals

- (United Kingdom) Jon Potter
- (South Korea) Kim Man-hoe

2 goals

- (Malaysia) Jagjit Singh Chet
- (Pakistan) Mushtaq Ahmad
- (Malaysia) K Embaraj
- (West Germany) Volker Knapp
- (West Germany) Heiner Dopp
- (Pakistan) Farhat Hassan Khan

1 goal

- (West Germany) Andreas Keller
- (Pakistan) Wasim Feroz
- (Pakistan) Naeem Akhtar
- (Pakistan) Shahbaz Ahmed
- (West Germany) Karl-Joachim Hürter
- (United Kingdom) David Faulkner
- (West Germany) Harald Brandenstein
- (Japan) Toici Nagal
- (Japan) Kazunori Maeda
- (Malaysia) Nor Saiful Zaini Nasir-ud-Din
- (West Germany) Stefan Saliger
- (West Germany) Ull Mayer
