= Field hockey at the 1984 Summer Olympics =

Field hockey at the Games of the XXIII Olympiad
- Venue: Weingart Stadium
- Dates: 29 July – 11 August 1984
- No. of events: 2

Field hockey at the 1984 Summer Olympics in Los Angeles took place from 29 July to 11 August 1984 at the Weingart Stadium, in Monterey Park.

== Men's tournament ==
=== Preliminary round ===
==== Group A ====
Pos	Team	Pld	W	D	L	GF	GA	GD	Pts	Qualification
1	Australia	5	5	0	0	17	4	+13	10	Semi-finals
2	West Germany	5	3	1	1	12	4	+8	7	Semi-finals
3	India	5	3	1	1	14	9	+5	7	5–8th place semi-finals
4	Spain	5	2	0	3	11	12	−1	4	5–8th place semi-finals
5	Malaysia	5	1	0	4	6	17	−11	2	9–12th place semi-finals
6	United States (H)	5	0	0	5	4	18	−14	0	9–12th place semi-finals

Source: FIH
(H) Hosts

==== Group B ====
Pos	Team	Pld	W	D	L	GF	GA	GD	Pts	Qualification
1	Great Britain	5	4	1	0	10	5	+5	9	Semi-finals
2	Pakistan	5	2	3	0	16	7	+9	7	Semi-finals
3	Netherlands	5	3	1	1	16	9	+7	7	5–8th place semi-finals
4	New Zealand	5	1	2	2	10	10	0	4	5–8th place semi-finals
5	Kenya	5	1	0	4	5	14	−9	2	9–12th place semi-finals
6	Canada	5	0	1	4	7	19	−12	1	9–12th place semi-finals

Source: FIH

=== Medal round ===
Semi-finals
9 August
West Germany	1
Great Britain	0
9 August
Australia	0
Pakistan	1

Gold-medal match
11 August
West Germany	1
Pakistan	2
Bronze-medal match
11 August
Great Britain	3
Australia	2

=== Final standings ===
1. Pakistan
2. West Germany
3. Great Britain
4. Australia
5. India
6. Netherlands
7. New Zealand
8. Spain
9. Kenya
10. Canada
11. Malaysia
12. United States

== Women's tournament ==
The United States and Australia played out a penalty shoot-out for the bronze medal after finishing equal on points and goal difference in the round robin stage, which the United States won 10–5.

=== Pool ===
Pos	Team	Pld	W	D	L	GF	GA	GD	Pts
1st place, gold medalist(s)	Netherlands	5	4	1	0	14	6	+8	9
2nd place, silver medalist(s)	West Germany	5	2	2	1	9	9	0	6
3rd place, bronze medalist(s)	United States (H)	5	2	1	2	9	7	+2	5
4	Australia	5	2	1	2	9	7	+2	5
5	Canada	5	2	1	2	9	11	−2	5
6	New Zealand	5	0	0	5	2	12	−10	0

Source: FIH
(H) Hosts

=== Final standings ===
1. Netherlands
2. West Germany
3. United States
4. Australia
5. Canada
6. New Zealand

== Medal summary ==
=== Medal table ===
* Host nation (United States)

Rank	Nation	Gold	Silver	Bronze	Total
1	Netherlands	1	0	0	1
1	Pakistan	1	0	0	1
3	West Germany	0	2	0	2
4	Great Britain	0	0	1	1
4	United States*	0	0	1	1
Totals (5 entries)		2	2	2	6

=== Medalists ===
Event	Gold	Silver	Bronze
Men's tournament	Pakistan; Syed Ghulam Moinuddin; Qasim Zia; Nasir Ali; Abdul Rashid Al-Hasan; Ayaz Mahmood; Naeem Akhtar; Kalimullah Khan; Manzoor Hussain; Hassan Sardar; Hanif Khan; Khalid Hamid; Shahid Ali Khan; Tauqeer Dar; Ishtiaq Ahmed; Saleem Sherwani; Mushtaq Ahmad	West Germany; Christian Bassemir; Stefan Blöcher; Dirk Brinkmann; Heiner Dopp; Carsten Fischer; Tobias Frank; Volker Fried; Thomas Gunst; Horst-Ulrich Hänel; Karl-Joachim Hürter; Andreas Keller; Reinhard Krull; Michael Peter; Thomas Reck; Ekkhard Schmidt-Opper; Markku Slawyk	Great Britain; Paul Barber; Stephen Batchelor; Kulbir Bhaura; Robert Cattrall; Richard Dodds; James Duthie; Norman Hughes; Sean Kerly; Richard Leman; Stephen Martin; Billy McConnell; Veryan Pappin; Jon Potter; Mark Precious; Ian Taylor; David Westcott
Women's tournament	Netherlands; Carina Benninga; Fieke Boekhorst; Marjolein Eijsvogel; Det de Beus; Irene Hendriks; Elsemiek Hillen; Sandra Le Poole; Anneloes Nieuwenhuizen; Martine Ohr; Alette Pos; Lisette Sevens; Marieke van Doorn; Aletta van Manen; Sophie von Weiler; Laurien Willemse; Margriet Zegers	West Germany; Gabriele Appel; Dagmar Breiken; Beate Deininger; Elke Drüll; Birgit Hagen; Birgit Hahn; Martina Koch; Sigrid Landgraf; Corinna Lingnau; Christina Moser; Patricia Ott; Hella Roth; Gabriela Schley; Susanne Schmid; Ursula Thielemann; Andrea Weiermann-Lietz	United States; Beth Anders; Beth Beglin; Regina Buggy; Gwen Cheeseman; Sheryl Johnson; Christine Larson-Mason; Kathleen McGahey; Anita Miller; Leslie Milne; Charlene Morett; Diane Moyer; Marcella Place; Karen Shelton; Brenda Stauffer; Julie Staver; Judy Strong

- Penalty stroke competition for the bronze medal: United States defeated Australia 10–5.
- Both teams had a 2–2–1 record and 9 goals for and 7 goals against. Canada also had a 2–2–1 record but had 9 goals for and 11 goals against.
- West Germany finished just ahead of the tied teams with a 2–1–2 record to claim silver.

== See also ==
- Field hockey at the 1984 Summer Olympics – Men's team squads
- Field hockey at the 1984 Summer Olympics – Women's team squads
- Field hockey at the Friendship Games
