= Water polo at the 1984 Summer Olympics =

Water polo at the Games of the XXIII Olympiad
- Venue: Raleigh Runnels Memorial Pool
- Dates: 1–10 August 1984
- Competitors: 153 from 12 nations

Medalists
1st place, gold medalist(s)		Yugoslavia
2nd place, silver medalist(s)		United States
3rd place, bronze medalist(s)		West Germany

The water polo tournament at the 1984 Summer Olympics was held from 1 to 10 August 1984, at the Raleigh Runnels Memorial Pool in Malibu, California. The tournament featured 12 teams, playing two rounds of round-robin play: preliminaries and finals.

Water polo was one of the four aquatic sports held at the 1984 Games, along with swimming, diving, and synchronized swimming, which was held for the first time.

== Qualification ==
Qualification	Date	Host	Berths	Qualified
Host nation	18 May 1978	Los Angeles	1	United States
1982 World Championships	30 July–7 August 1982	(Ecuador) Guayaquil	~~6~~ 3	~~Soviet Union~~
1982 World Championships	30 July–7 August 1982	(Ecuador) Guayaquil	~~6~~ 3	~~Hungary~~
1982 World Championships	30 July–7 August 1982	(Ecuador) Guayaquil	~~6~~ 3	West Germany
1982 World Championships	30 July–7 August 1982	(Ecuador) Guayaquil	~~6~~ 3	Netherlands
1982 World Championships	30 July–7 August 1982	(Ecuador) Guayaquil	~~6~~ 3	~~Cuba~~
1982 World Championships	30 July–7 August 1982	(Ecuador) Guayaquil	~~6~~ 3	Yugoslavia
Intercontinental qualification	13–22 April 1984		5	Italy Spain Australia Greece China
Wildcards			3	Canada
Wildcards			3	Japan
Wildcards			3	Brazil
Total			12	

== Teams ==
12 teams played in the 1984 Olympic tournament:

- Australia
- Brazil
- Canada
- China
- Greece
- Italy
- Japan
- Netherlands
- Spain
- United States
- West Germany
- Yugoslavia

The top 8 teams qualified for the 1985 FINA Men's Water Polo World Cup in Duisburg, West Germany.

== Tournament play ==
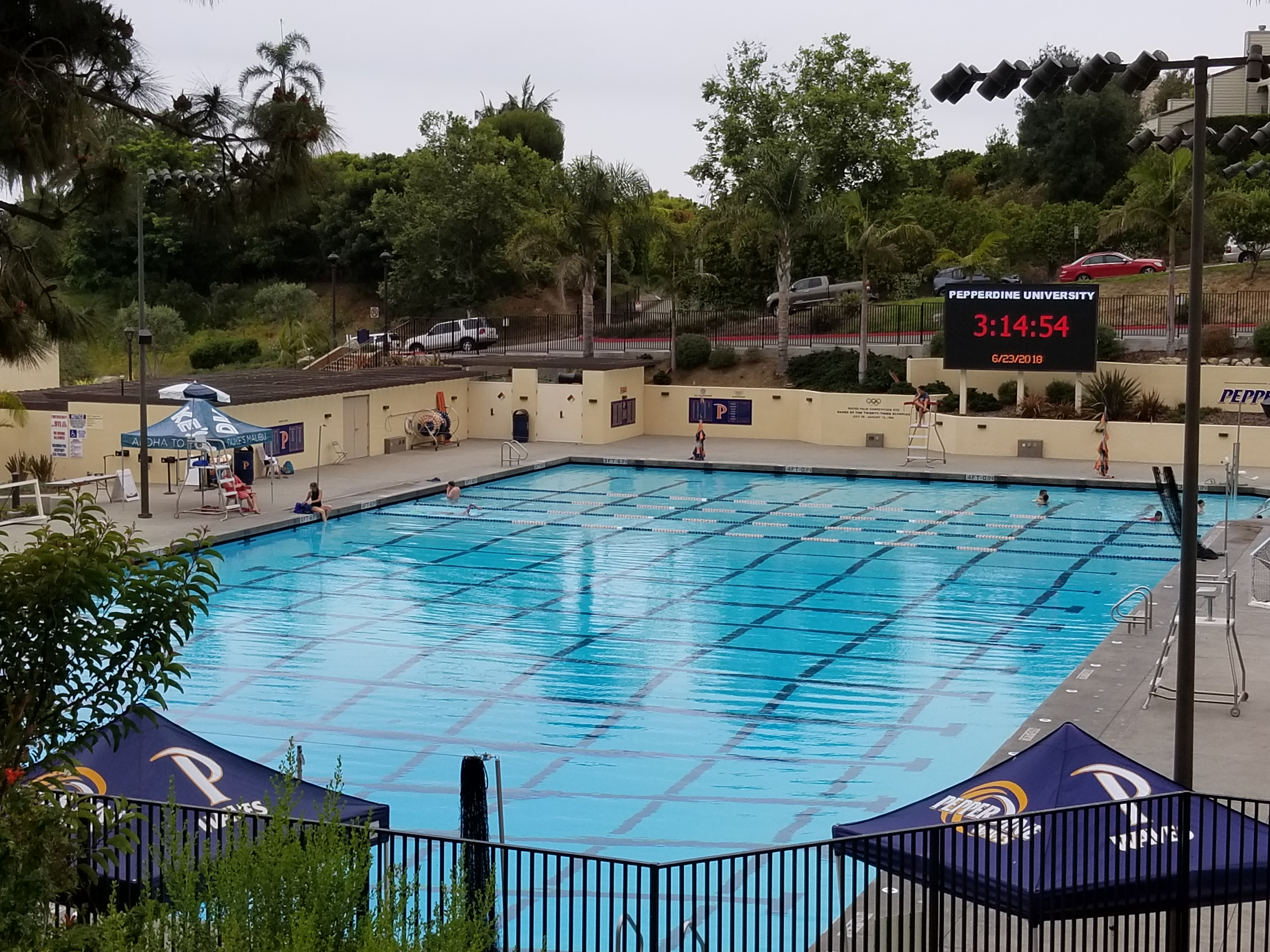
The Water Polo competition was held at the Raleigh Runnels Memorial Pool.

The tournament was set up into 2 levels of round-robin play: preliminary play in 3 groups; and final play in 2 groups. The top 2 teams from each preliminary group (shaded ones) advanced to Group D and played for the top-6 places; the bottom 2 teams from each preliminary group played in Group E to determine places 7-12.

=== Preliminary round ===
==== Group A ====
Qualified for second group stage

Team	GP	W	D	L	GF	GA	GD	Pts
Yugoslavia	3	3	0	0	34	16	+18	6
Netherlands	3	2	0	1	25	26	–1	4
China	3	1	0	2	21	27	–6	2
Canada	3	0	0	3	18	29	−11	0

- 1 August

Yugoslavia	13 – 4	Canada
China	8 – 10	Netherlands

- 2 August

Yugoslavia	12 – 7	China
Netherlands	10 – 9	Canada

- 3 August

China	6 – 5	Canada
Yugoslavia	9 – 5	Netherlands

==== Group B ====
Qualified for second group stage

Team	GP	W	D	L	GF	GA	GD	Pts
United States	3	3	0	0	32	17	+15	6
Spain	3	2	0	1	39	31	+8	4
Greece	3	0	1	2	23	33	–10	1
Brazil	3	0	1	2	25	38	−13	1

- 1 August

Spain	19 – 12	Brazil
United States	12 – 5	Greece

- 2 August

Spain	12 – 9	Greece
United States	10 – 4	Brazil

- 3 August

Greece	9 – 9	Brazil
Spain	8 – 10	United States

==== Group C ====
Qualified for second group stage

Team	GP	W	D	L	GF	GA	GD	Pts
West Germany	3	3	0	0	35	18	+17	6
Australia	3	1	1	1	29	20	+9	3
Italy	3	1	1	1	27	23	+4	3
Japan	3	0	0	3	15	45	−30	0

- 1 August

Italy	15 – 5	Japan
West Germany	10 – 6	Australia

- 2 August

Australia	8 – 8	Italy
West Germany	15 – 8	Japan

- 3 August

Japan	2 – 15	Australia
West Germany	10 – 4	Italy

=== Final round ===
==== Group D ====
	Team	Points	G	W	D	L	GF	GA	Diff
1.	Yugoslavia	9	5	4	1	0	47	33	+14
2.	United States	9	5	4	1	0	43	34	+9
3.	West Germany	5	5	2	1	2	49	34	+15
4.	Spain	4	5	1	2	2	42	46	–4
5.	Australia	3	5	1	1	3	37	48	–11
6.	Netherlands	0	5	0	0	5	25	48	–23

- 6 August

Australia	6 – 9	Yugoslavia
United States	8 – 7	Netherlands
Spain	8 – 8	West Germany

- 7 August

United States	12 – 7	Australia
Yugoslavia	10 – 9	West Germany
Spain	8 – 4	Netherlands

- 9 August

United States	8 – 7	West Germany
Netherlands	7 – 8	Australia
Spain	8 – 14	Yugoslavia

- 10 August

West Germany	15 – 2	Netherlands
Australia	10 – 10	Spain
United States	5 – 5	Yugoslavia

==== Group E ====
	Team	Points	G	W	D	L	GF	GA	Diff
7.	Italy	9	5	4	1	0	63	34	+29
8.	Greece	8	5	3	2	0	52	41	+11
9.	China	6	5	3	0	2	44	39	+5
10.	Canada	3	5	1	1	3	40	48	–8
11.	Japan	2	5	1	0	4	30	55	–25
12.	Brazil	2	5	0	2	3	40	52	–12

- 6 August

China	10 – 4	Japan
Greece	11 – 8	Canada
Italy	13 – 4	Brazil

- 7 August

Greece	14 – 7	Japan
Italy	11 – 8	China
Canada	10 – 10	Brazil

- 9 August

China	11 – 9	Brazil
Canada	8 – 5	Japan
Greece	8 – 8	Italy

- 10 August

Japan	9 – 8	Brazil
Italy	16 – 9	Canada
Greece	10 – 9	China

== Final ranking ==
Gold medal	Yugoslavia
Silver medal	United States
Bronze medal	West Germany
4	Spain
5	Australia
6	Netherlands
7	Italy
8	Greece
9	China
10	Canada
11	Japan
12	Brazil

== Medalists ==
Gold	Silver	Bronze
Yugoslavia Milorad Krivokapić; Deni Lušić; Zoran Petrović; Božo Vuletić; Veselin Đuho; Zoran Roje; Milivoj Bebić; Perica Bukić; Goran Sukno; Tomislav Paškvalin; Igor Milanović; Dragan Andrić; Andrija Popović Head coach: Ratko Rudić	United States Craig Wilson; Kevin Robertson; Gary Figueroa; Peter Campbell; Doug Burke; Joseph Vargas; Jon Svendsen; John Siman; Andrew McDonald; Terry Schroeder; Jody Campbell; Timothy Shaw; Chris Dorst Head coach: Monte Nitzkowski	West Germany Peter Röhle; Thomas Loebb; Frank Otto; Rainer Hoppe; Armando Fernández; Thomas Huber; Jürgen Schroder; Rainer Osselmann; Hagen Stamm; Roland Freund; Dirk Theismann; Santiago Chalmovsky; Werner Obschernikat Head coach: Nico Firoiu

=== Top goalscorers ===
Rank	Player	Goals
1	Manuel Estiarte (ESP)	34
2	Mario Fiorillo (ITA)	19
3	Frank Otto (FRG)	18
4	Charles Turner (AUS)	17
5	Milivoj Bebić (YUG)	16
5	Hagen Stamm (FRG)	16
5	Wang Xiaotian (CHN)	16
8	Mario Souto (BRA)	15
8	Eric Tebbe Borges (BRA)	15
8	Christopher Wybrow (AUS)	15
8	Sotirios Stathakis (GRE)	15
12	Terry Schroeder (USA)	14

== See also ==
- Water polo at the 1982 World Aquatics Championships – Men's tournament
- Water polo at the 1986 World Aquatics Championships – Men's tournament
- Water polo at the Friendship Games

== Sources ==
- PDF documents in the LA84 Foundation Digital Library:
  - Official Report of the 1984 Olympic Games, v.2 (download, archive) (pp. 528–534)
- Water polo on the Olympedia website
  - Water polo at the 1984 Summer Olympics (men's tournament)
- Water polo on the Sports Reference website
  - Water polo at the 1984 Summer Games (men's tournament) (archived)
