= Hockey at the 1984 Olympics =

Hockey at the 1984 Olympics may refer to:

- Ice hockey at the 1984 Winter Olympics
- Field hockey at the 1984 Summer Olympics
