= Nicolae Firoiu =

Romanian water polo player and coach

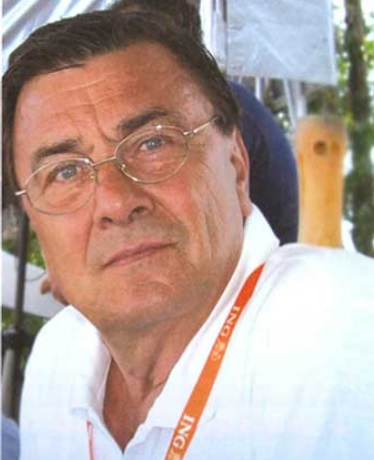

Personal information
- Nickname: Nico
- Born: 4 March 1939 (age 87) Bucharest, Romania
- Height: 185 cm (6 ft 1 in)

Sport
- Sport: Water polo

Senior clubs
- Years: Team
- 1955–1958 1958–1968 1968–1969: Voința București; Steaua Bucuresti; Rapid București
National team
- Years: Team
- 1958–1969: Romania

Teams coached
- 1969–1971 1971–1972 1972–1974 1974–1975 1975–1988 1993–1997: Iran; Romania; Iran; Aegir Uerdingen; West Germany; Germany
Medal record
Men's water polo
Head Coach Iran
Asian Games
Gold medal – first place	1974 Tehran	Team
Head Coach West Germany
Olympic Games
Bronze medal – third place	1984 Los Angeles	Team
World Championship
Bronze medal – third place	1982 Guayaquil	Team
European Championship
Gold medal – first place	1981 Split	Team
Bronze medal – third place	1985 Sofia	Team
FINA World Cup
Gold medal – first place	1985 Duisburg	Team
Silver medal – second place	1983 Malibu	Team
Bronze medal – third place	1987 Thessaloniki	Team
Head Coach Germany
European Championship
Bronze medal – third place	1995 Vienna	Team

Nicolae Firoiu (born 4 March 1939), commonly known as Nico Firoiu, is a Romanian former water polo player and coach. He competed in the 1960 and 1964 Summer Olympics.

After retiring as a player, he coached the national teams of Iran and Romania. In 1974, he moved permanently to West Germany. In November 1975, he became the national head coach, reforming German water polo and leading his team to a gold medal at the 1981 European Championships, as well as bronze medals at the 1982 World Championships and the 1984 Olympic Games.

== See also ==
- Germany men's Olympic water polo team records and statistics
