= Mario Souto =

Brazilian water polo player

Personal information
- Born: 5 November 1960 (age 64); Niterói, Brazil

Sport
- Sport: Water polo

Mario Souto (born 5 November 1960) is a Brazilian water polo player. He competed in the men's tournament at the 1984 Summer Olympics.
