= Dave Wilson (swimmer) =

American swimmer (born 1960)

Personal information
- Full name: David Dennis Wilson
- Nickname: "Dave"
- National team: United States
- Born: October 5, 1960 (age 65) Torrance, California
- Occupation: Real Estate
- Height: 6 ft 3 in (1.91 m)
- Weight: 187 lb (85 kg)
- Spouse: Dru Deborah Dabney (m. 1988)

Sport
- Sport: Swimming
- Strokes: Butterfly, Backstroke
- Club: Cincinnati Marlins Swim Club
- College team: University of California, Berkeley
- Coach: Skip Kenney (Marlins); Nort Thornton (UC Berkeley)
Medal record
Men's swimming
Representing the United States
Olympic Games
Gold medal – first place	1984 Los Angeles	4x100 m medley
Silver medal – second place	1984 Los Angeles	100 m backstroke
Universiade
Silver medal – second place	1981 Bucharest	4×100 m medley

David "Dave" Dennis Wilson (born October 5, 1960) is an American former competition swimmer who competed for the University of California at Berkeley and was a two-time Olympic medalist in the 1984 Los Angeles Olympics.

== Early swimming ==
Wilson was born on October 5, 1960, in Long Beach, California, sometimes reported as nearby Torrance, to Mr. and Mrs. Garth L. Wilson, though he spent his High School years in greater Cincinnati, Ohio. By 12, Wilson swam for the highly competitive Cincinnati Marlins Swim club. On August 10–12, 1973, while swimming for the Marlins at the Ohio AAU Long Course "A" Swimming Championships, then coached by 1968 Olympic gold medalist Charlie Hickcox, Wilson won six races including both the 100-meter backstroke, and butterfly, and the 200 meter medley relay. At the same 1973 Ohio AAU Long Course Swimming Championship, Wilson set a State age-group record in winning the 100-meter freestyle with a time of 1:01.872. In January, 1974, at 13, he helped the Marlins team win the Club Olympia A Invitational Tournament, winning the 50, 100, and 200-yard freestyles and setting a pool record on a winning 200 medley relay team. Known almost exclusively as "Dave" in newspaper reporting, Wilson set the national high school record in the 100 yard butterfly while swimming for Cincinnati's Anderson High School at the District Meet in his Senior year in 1979, breaking Mark Spitz's former record. As a 1978 High School junior, he won the Ohio state championships in both the 100 butterfly and swam a national high school record in the 100-yard backstroke of 51.37 seconds.

As a High School Senior at Anderson High, Wilson again broke the state record in the 100 butterfly and again set a National record in the 100-yard backstroke event. By his Senior year, Wilson was a High School All American, and in 1978 was ranked first among High School boys in the 100-yard backstroke, and the 100-yard butterfly. Competing at 15 in mid-December 1975, representing Anderson High at the Princeton Invitational, Wilson placed second in the 200 freestyle with a time of 1:52.317, and third in the 100 freestyle with a 51.478. By his Senior year, swimming for the Marlins, Wilson was trained by Hall of Fame Marlins Head Coach Skip Kenney, who would later coach swimming at Stanford University. In his Senior year at Anderson High School, Wilson was trained and managed by Anderson's new Head Coach Nick Douglass.

== University of California Berkeley ==
Wilson attended the University of California Berkeley, beginning around 1979, competing on the varsity swim team from 1981 to 1983, and graduating in 1983. At UC Berkeley he was managed by Hall of Fame Coach Nort Thornton. A highly competitive team, the University of California Berkeley under Thornton won the NCAA Division I Championship in 1979 at Cleveland State, defeating the runner-up University of Southern California. They won the NCAA Championship with Wilson's participation in 1980 at Harvard, defeating runner-up University of Texas. Wilson performed well in dual meets in collegiate competition at the University of California, and swam on a number of outstanding relay teams while at the university, but was not an exceptional performer in National NCAA Division I Collegiate competition.

In international competition, Wilson captured a silver medal in the 4×100 meter medley relay at the 1981 Summer Universiade in Bucharest. He swam at the 1983 Universiade in Edmonton, Alberta in the backstroke, but did not metal, placing fifth in the 100-meter event.

Continuing to excel in backstoke, in 1984 Wilson won the 100-meter backstroke event at the U.S. Short Course Championships.

== 1984 Los Angeles Olympics ==
Wilson swam in the 100-meter backstroke with a time of 56.65 placing second to Rick Carey at the June 1984 U.S. Olympic Trials at the Indiana University Pool in Indianapolis. Though he had formerly excelled in the butterfly as well, after making the team in the backstroke, he trained at Mission Viejo, California with the Olympic team in preparation for the Los Angeles Olympics.

At the 1984 Summer Olympics in Los Angeles, Wilson earned a gold medal by swimming the backstroke leg for the winning U.S. team in Heat three of the preliminary heats of the men's 4×100-meter medley relay, though he did not swim in the event finals. He also won a silver medal by finishing second in the final of the men's 100-meter backstroke event, swimming his personal best time of 56.35 and placing second to U.S. teammate Rick Carey who swam a 55.79 and led the entire race, though not by a large margin.

=== Honors ===
In 1978, while Wilson was a High School swimmer, Swimming World Magazine named him the Preparatory School co-swimmer of the Year.

=== Post swimming careers ===
After competing his degree at the University of California Berkeley, Wilson earned an MBA degree from Southern Methodist University. After earning his MBA, Wilson worked for several Southeastern area real estate companies, including serving fourteen years with the large Hines Company, and after 2004 was an executive with the Southern Land Company. He founded Fifth Lane Real Estate Company, in Franklin, Tennessee, a suburb of Nashville, in 2009. As of August 2021, Wilson served as a Director of Search Nashville, an organization that connects individuals seeking answers about God. His real estate career lasted around twenty-five years.

At the age of 27, Wilson married Dru Deborah Dabney, a University of Texas graduate, on September 10, 1988, at Preston Hollow Presbyterian in Dallas, Texas. After their marriage they planned to reside in Atlanta, Georgia, though they have since relocated. As of 2018, they had three children: a daughter, Dabney, and twin sons, James and Matthew.

== See also ==
- List of Olympic medalists in swimming (men)
