= Ursula Thielemann =

German field hockey player

Ulla Thielemann
Personal information
- Full name: Ursula Thielemann
- Born: 9 January 1960 (age 66) Hanau, West Germany
- Height: 170 cm (5 ft 7 in)
- Weight: 60 kg (132 lb)

Sport
- Sport: Field hockey
Medal record
Women's field hockey
Representing West Germany
Olympic Games
Silver medal – second place	1984 Los Angeles	Team competition

Ursula "Ulla" Thielemann (born 9 January 1960 in Hanau) was a field hockey international from West Germany, who won the silver medal with her national squad at the 1984 Summer Olympics in Los Angeles. She was the first goalkeeper in women's field hockey to wear a helmet.
