= Dirk Korthals =

German swimmer (born 1962)

Personal information
- Born: 22 March 1962 (age 64) Vreden, West Germany
- Height: 196 cm (6 ft 5 in)
- Weight: 88 kg (194 lb)

Sport
- Sport: Swimming
Medal record
Representing West Germany
Olympic Games
Silver medal – second place	1984 Los Angeles	4x200 m freestyle relay
World Championships
Silver medal – second place	1986 Madrid	4x200m freestyle relay
Bronze medal – third place	1982 Guayaquil	4x200m freestyle relay
European Championships
Gold medal – first place	1985 Sofia	4x100m freestyle relay

Dirk Korthals (born 22 March 1962) is a German former swimmer who competed in the 1984 Summer Olympics.
