= Tobias Frank =

German hockey player

Olympic medal record

Men's field hockey

Representing West Germany
Silver medal – second place	1984 Los Angeles	Team competition
Silver medal – second place	1988 Seoul	Team competition

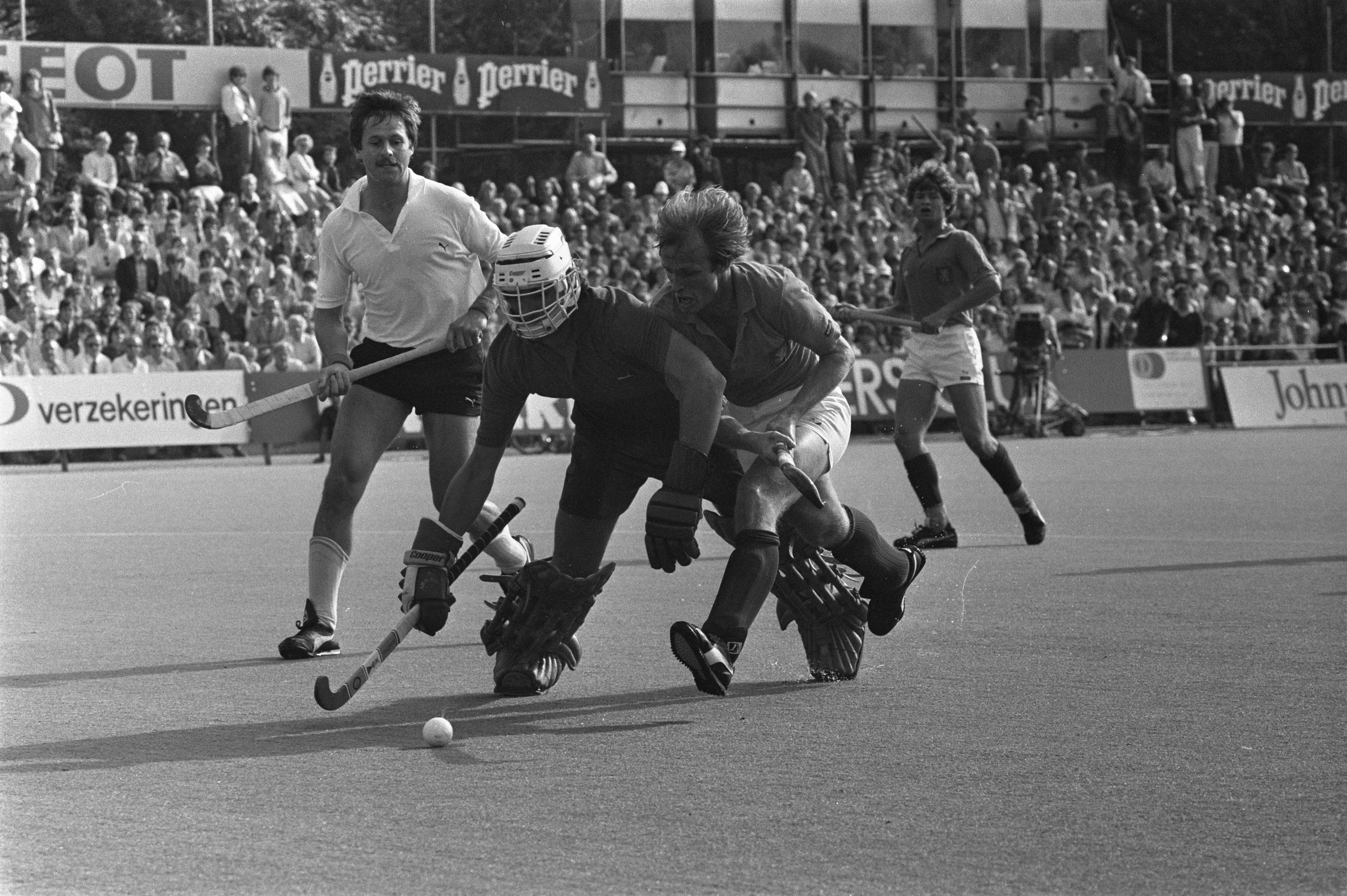
Goalkeeper Tobias Frank in a duel with Dutch hockey player Cees Jan Diepeveen, 1982

Tobias Frank (born 5 April 1958, in Worms) is a German former field hockey player who competed in the 1984 Summer Olympics and in the 1988 Summer Olympics.
