= Birgit Hagen =

German field hockey player

Personal information
- Born: 6 June 1957 (age 69) Grevenbroich, West Germany
- Height: 165 cm (5 ft 5 in)
- Weight: 55 kg (121 lb)

Sport
- Sport: Field hockey
Medal record
Women's field hockey
Representing West Germany
Olympic Games
Silver medal – second place	1984 Los Angeles	Team competition

Birgit Hagen (born 6 June 1957 in Grevenbroich) is a German former field hockey player who competed in the 1984 Summer Olympics.
