= Horst-Ulrich Hänel =

German field hockey player

Personal information
- Born: 3 June 1957 (age 69)
Medal record
Men's field hockey
Representing West Germany
Olympic Games
Silver medal – second place	1984 Los Angeles	Team competition
Silver medal – second place	1988 Seoul	Team competition

Horst-Ulrich Hänel (born 3 June 1957 in Plau am See, Bezirk Schwerin) is a former field hockey player from West Germany, who twice won the silver medal at the Summer Olympics. He did so in 1984 (Los Angeles) and 1988 (Seoul).
