= Dagmar Bremer =

German field hockey player

Personal information
- Born: Dagmar Breiken; 13 September 1963 (age 62) Cologne, West Germany
- Height: 170 cm (5 ft 7 in)
- Weight: 62 kg (137 lb)

Sport
- Sport: Field hockey
Medal record
Women's field hockey
Representing West Germany
Olympic Games
Silver medal – second place	1984 Los Angeles	Team competition

Dagmar Bremer (née Breiken, born 13 September 1963 in Cologne) is a German female former field hockey player who competed in the 1984 Summer Olympics and in the 1988 Summer Olympics.
