= Thomas Huber (water polo) =

German water polo player

Personal information
- Born: 4 November 1963 (age 63) Stuttgart, West Germany

Sport
- Sport: Water polo
Medal record
Representing West Germany
Olympic Games
Bronze medal – third place	1984 Los Angeles	Team competition

Thomas Huber (born 4 November 1963) is a German former water polo player who competed in the 1984 Summer Olympics and in the 1988 Summer Olympics.

== See also ==
- List of Olympic medalists in water polo (men)
