= Jagjit Singh Chet =

Malaysian field hockey player (born 1961)

Personal information
- Nationality: Malaysian
- Born: 26 April 1961 (age 65) Ipoh

Sport
- Sport: Field hockey
Medal record
Men's field hockey
Representing Malaysia
Asian Games
| Bronze medal – third place | 1982 New Delhi | Team |

Jagjit Singh Chet (born 26 April 1961) is a Malaysian field hockey player. He competed in the men's tournament at the 1984 Summer Olympics.
