= Frédéric Delcourt =

French swimmer (born 1964)

Personal information
- National team: France
- Born: 14 February 1964 (age 62) Saint-Mandé, France
- Height: 1.80 m (5 ft 11 in)
- Weight: 77 kg (170 lb)

Sport
- Sport: Swimming
- Strokes: Backstroke
- Club: CN Marseille
- College team: University of Florida
Medal record
Men's swimming
Representing France
Olympic Games
Silver medal – second place	1984 Los Angeles	200 m backstroke
European Championships
Bronze medal – third place	1981 Split	200 m backstroke
Mediterranean Games
Gold medal – first place	1979 Split	100 m backstroke

Frédéric Delcourt (born 14 February 1964) is a French former competition swimmer and Olympic silver medalist.

Delcourt was born in Nord, France.

He competed in three events for France at the 1980 Summer Olympics in Moscow, Russia, including swimming the backstroke leg for the fifth-place French men's 4x100-meter medley relay team. Delcourt won the silver medal in the men's 200-meter backstroke event at the 1984 Summer Olympics in Los Angeles, California.

Delcourt attended the University of Florida in Gainesville, Florida, where he swam for coach Randy Reese's Florida Gators swimming and diving team in National Collegiate Athletic Association (NCAA) competition in 1984.

== See also ==
- List of Olympic medalists in swimming (men)
- List of University of Florida alumni
- List of University of Florida Olympians
