= Susi Schmid =

German field hockey player

Personal information
- Full name: Susanne Leonie Schmid
- Born: 27 August 1960 (age 65) Bergisch Gladbach, West Germany
- Height: 170 cm (5 ft 7 in)
- Weight: 64 kg (141 lb)

Sport
- Sport: Field hockey
Medal record
Women's field hockey
Representing West Germany
Olympic Games
Silver medal – second place	1984 Los Angeles	Team competition

Susanne Leonie "Susi" Schmid (born 27 August 1960 in Bergisch Gladbach) is a German female former field hockey player who competed in the 1984 Summer Olympics and in the 1988 Summer Olympics.
