= Martyn Grimley =

British field hockey player

Personal information
- Born: 24 February 1963 (age 63) Halifax, West Yorkshire, England
- Height: 183 cm (6 ft 0 in)
- Weight: 78 kg (172 lb)

Sport
- Sport: Field hockey
- Position: Outside left
Senior career
Years	Team	Caps	Goals
1983–1987	Brooklands	-	-
1987–1992	Hounslow	-	-
1992–2000	Brooklands	-	-
National team
Years	Team	Caps	Goals
–	Great Britain	178	-
Medal record
Men's field hockey
Representing Great Britain
Olympic Games
Gold medal – first place	1988 Seoul	Team competition
Champions Trophy
Silver medal – second place	1985 Perth	Team competition
Representing England
World Cup
Silver medal – second place	1986 London	Team competition
European Championship
Silver medal – second place	1987 Moscow	Team
Bronze medal – third place	1991 Paris	Team

Martyn Andrew Grimley (born 24 February 1963) is a British former field hockey player who competed at the 1988 Summer Olympics, where he won a gold medal.

== Biography ==
Grimley was born in Halifax, England, and played club hockey for Brooklands Hockey Club in the Men's England Hockey League and represented Cheshire at county level.

He was selected for the England U16 and U21 squads and was shortlisted for the 1984 Summer Olympics but failed to make the final cut but was part of the silver medal winning Great Britain team that competed at the 1985 Men's Hockey Champions Trophy in Perth, Australia. Grimley gained a position at Banbury School in Oxfordshire as a Physical Education teacher in September 1985, following his training at Crewe and Alsager College. The new job resulted in him moving from Sale to Banbury

While at Brooklands he represented England at the 1986 Men's Hockey World Cup, winning silver. He signed for Hounslow Hockey Club for the start of the 1987/88 season and would go on to win gold with the Great Britain squad at the 1988 Summer Olympics in Seoul.

Later, he taught geography, Physical Education and Outdoor Education at Dulwich College in London and after returning from the Olympics in 1988 he joined Zurich Financial Services. Still at Hounslow, he represented England at the 1990 Men's Hockey World Cup.

In 1992, he returned to the Manchester area to live in Ashton upon Mersey and re-joined his former team Brooklands after the 1992 season and would become player coach in 1996. After retiring from international competition he had earned a combined total of 178 international caps for England and Great Britain.

He has since become a company director running a Cheshire - based financial services business 'Warriner & Co Ltd'. He is a life member of Brooklands Manchester University Hockey Club.

In 2018 he became Cheshire seniors strokeplay golf champion with a first time victory at Bromborough Golf Club and also won the Cheshire seniors matchplay championship in 2019.
