= Naeem Akhtar (field hockey) =

Pakistani field hockey player (born 1961)

Medal record

Men's field hockey

Representing Pakistan

Olympic Games
Gold medal – first place	1984 Los Angeles	Team

Naeem Akhtar (born June 8, 1961) is a Pakistani field hockey player. He was born in Abbottabad. He won a gold medal at the 1984 Summer Olympics in Los Angeles.
