= Andrea Weiermann-Lietz =

German field hockey player

Personal information
- Full name: Andrea Sybille Weiermann-Lietz
- Born: 15 December 1958 (age 67) Köln, West Germany
- Height: 163 cm (5 ft 4 in)
- Weight: 54 kg (119 lb)

Sport
- Sport: Field hockey
Medal record
Women's field hockey
Representing West Germany
Olympic Games
Silver medal – second place	1984 Los Angeles	Team competition

Andrea Sybille Weiermann-Lietz (born 15 December 1958 in Köln) is a German female former field hockey player who competed in the 1984 Summer Olympics.
