= Elke Drüll =

German field hockey player

Personal information
- Full name: Elke Doris Drüll
- Born: 1 April 1956 (age 70) Neuss, West Germany
- Height: 163 cm (5 ft 4 in)
- Weight: 58 kg (128 lb)

Sport
- Sport: Field hockey
Medal record
Women's field hockey
Representing West Germany
Olympic Games
Silver medal – second place	1984 Los Angeles	Team competition

Elke Doris Drüll (born 1 April 1956 in Neuss) is a German former field hockey player who competed in the 1984 Summer Olympics.
