= Wolf-Rüdiger Schulz =

German water polo player

Personal information
- Nationality: German
- Born: 4 February 1940 (age 85); Berlin, Germany

Sport
- Sport: Water polo

Wolf-Rüdiger Schulz (born 4 February 1940) is a German water polo player. He competed in the men's tournament at the 1968 Summer Olympics.
