= Hella Roth =

German field hockey player

Personal information
- Born: 21 September 1963 (age 62) Stuttgart, West Germany
- Height: 166 cm (5 ft 5 in)
- Weight: 60 kg (132 lb)

Sport
- Sport: Field hockey
Medal record
Women's field hockey
Representing West Germany
Olympic Games
Silver medal – second place	1984 Los Angeles	Team competition

Hella Roth (born 21 September 1963 in Stuttgart) is a German female former field hockey player who competed in the 1984 Summer Olympics. Hella Roth and the West German female field hockey team won the silver medal at the 1984 Los Angeles Olympics round-robin tournament, finishing with six points. She was European Indoor Champion in 1985 and won the bronze medal at the 1984 Europeans, and then added a silver medal at the 1986 Worlds. Roth won 83 international caps (including five indoor) between 1982 and 1987.

Domestically, Roth played with Stuttgarter Kickers and Kölner HTC Blau-Weiss. In 1986 and 1987 she helped Köln win the German Championship, and in 1985 the Indoor title.
