= Ignatios Psyllakis =

Greek sports shooter

Personal information
- Nationality: Greek
- Born: 15 April 1963 (age 61)

Sport
- Sport: Sports shooting

Ignatios Psyllakis (born 15 April 1963) is a Greek sports shooter. He competed in three events at the 1984 Summer Olympics.
