= Andreas Thiel =

German handball player (born 1960)

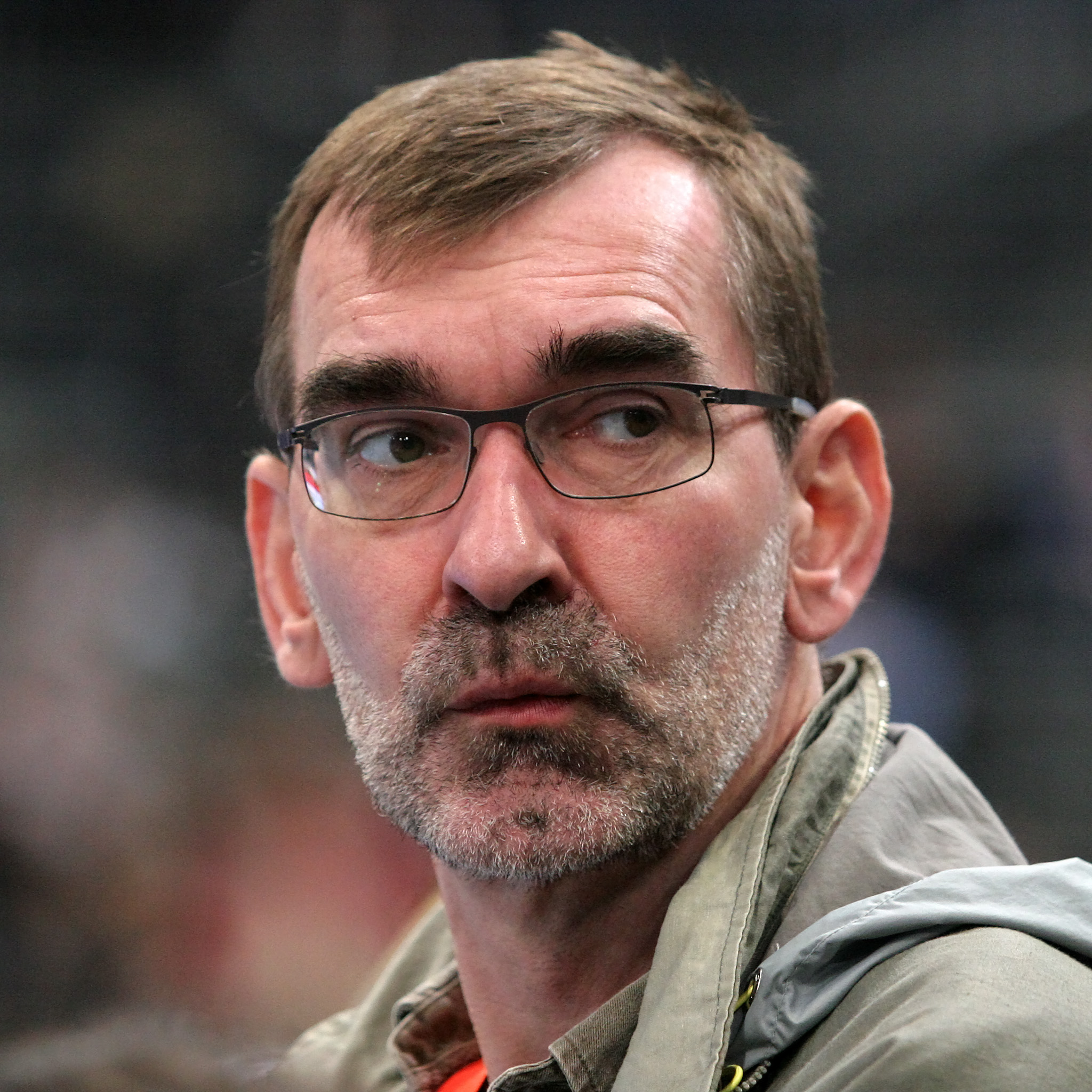
- Thiel in 2008

Personal information
- Born: March 3, 1960 (age 66) Lünen, North Rhine-Westphalia, West Germany
- Height: 1.94 m (6 ft 4 in)
Medal record
Men's handball
Representing West Germany
Olympic Games
Silver medal – second place	1984 Los Angeles	Team

Andreas Thiel (born March 3, 1960) is a former German handball player who competed in the 1984 Summer Olympics, in the 1992 Summer Olympics and in the 1996 Summer Olympics.

He was inducted into the EHF Hall of Fame in 2024.

In 1984 he was a member of the West German handball team which won the silver medal. He played all six matches as goalkeeper.

Eight years later he was part of the German team which finished tenth. He played five matches as goalkeeper.

In 1996 he played all six matches as goalkeeper for the German team again.
