= Sigrid Landgraf =

German field hockey player

Personal information
- Born: 7 May 1959 (age 67) Hanau, West Germany
- Height: 174 cm (5 ft 9 in)
- Weight: 62 kg (137 lb)

Sport
- Sport: Field hockey
Medal record
Women's field hockey
Representing West Germany
Olympic Games
Silver medal – second place	1984 Los Angeles	Team competition

Sigrid Landgraf (born 7 May 1959 in Hanau) is a German former field hockey player who competed in the 1984 Summer Olympics.
