= Greece at the 1984 Summer Olympics =

- IOC code: GRE
- NOC: Committee of the Olympic Games

in Los Angeles United States
- Competitors: 63 (59 men and 4 women) in 11 sports
- Flag bearer: Stelios Mygiakis
- Medals Ranked 30th: Gold 0 Silver 1 Bronze 1 Total 2

Summer Olympics appearances (overview)
- 1896; 1900; 1904; 1908; 1912; 1920; 1924; 1928; 1932; 1936; 1948; 1952; 1956; 1960; 1964; 1968; 1972; 1976; 1980; 1984; 1988; 1992; 1996; 2000; 2004; 2008; 2012; 2016; 2020; 2024; 2028

Other related appearances
- 1906 Intercalated Games

Greece competed at the 1984 Summer Olympics in Los Angeles, United States. 63 competitors, 59 men and 4 women, took part in 49 events in 11 sports. Greek athletes have competed in every Summer Olympic Games.

== Medalists ==
Medal	Name	Sport	Event	Date
Silver	Dimitrios Thanopoulos	Wrestling	Men's Greco-Roman 82 kg	3 August
Bronze	Babis Kholidis	Wrestling	Men's Greco-Roman 57 kg	3 August

== Athletics ==
Three male and one female athletes represented Greece.

Men's Marathon

- Michail Koussis

- Final — 2:17:38 (→ 26th place)

Men's High Jump

- Dimitrios Kattis

- Qualification — 2.15m (→ did not advance)

Men's Shot Put

- Dimitrios Koutsoukis

- Qualifying Round — 18.74 m (→ did not advance)

Women's Javelin Throw

- Anna Verouli

- Qualification — DSQ (→ did not advance)

== Boxing ==
Greece was represented by one boxer.

Men's Heavyweight (– 91 kg)

- Georgios Stefanopoulos

- First Round – Bye
- Second Round – Defeated Douglas Young (GBR), KO-2
- Quarterfinals – Lost to Arnold Vanderlyde (HOL), 0:5

== Cycling ==
Two cyclists represented Greece in 1984.

Individual road race

- Kanellos Kanellopoulos – did not finish (→ no ranking)
- Ilias Kelesidis – did not finish (→ no ranking)

== Fencing ==
One male fencer represented Greece in 1984.

Men's sabre

- Zisis Babanasis

== Rowing ==
Greece was represented by one rower.

- Single sculls - Kostas Kontomanolis (6th place)

== Sailing ==
Greece was represented by six male competitors.

Men

Athlete	Event	Race							Net points	Final rank
Athlete	Event	1	2	3	4	5	6	7	Net points	Final rank
Stelios Georgousopoulos	Windglider	22	28	32	32	31	25	~~DNF~~	206.0	31

Open

Athlete	Event	Race							Net points	Final rank
Athlete	Event	1	2	3	4	5	6	7	Net points	Final rank
Armanto Ortolano	Finn	14	3	14	13	15	17	~~DNF~~	108.7	16
Ilias Hatzipavlis; Leonidas Pelekanakis	Star	2	1	11	~~13~~	11	10	8	67.0	6
Tassos Boudouris; Dimitrios Deligiannis; Georgios Spyridis	Soling	8	5	4	1	6	~~DNF~~	9	59.2	6

== Shooting ==
Greece was represented in five events by four men and one woman.

- 10 metres air rifle, men - Ignatios Psyllakis (9th place); Pelopidas Iliadis (32nd place)
- 50 metres rifle three positions, men - Ignatios Psyllakis (=26th place); Pelopidas Iliadis (=41st place)
- 50 metres rifle prone, men - Ignatios Psyllakis (=23rd place)
- Skeet, open - Panagiotis Xanthakos (=38th place); Rodolfos Georgios Alexakos (45th place)
- 25 metres pistol, women - Agi Kasoumi (=21st place)

== Swimming ==
Ggreece was represented in 8 events by two male swimmers and one female swimmer.

Men's 100m Backstroke

- Ilias Malamas

- Heat — 58.69 (→ did not advance, 19th place)

- Kristofer Stivenson

- Heat — 58.76 (→ did not advance, 20th place)

Men's 200m Backstroke

- Kristofer Stivenson

- Heat — 2:08.38 (→ did not advance, 23rd place)

Men's 100m Butterfly

- Kristofer Stivenson

- Heat — 55.46
- B-Final — 55.61 (→ 12th place)

Men's 200m Butterfly

- Kristofer Stivenson

- Heat — 2:02.94 (→ did not advance, 17th place)

Women's 100m Freestyle

- Sofia Dara

- Heat — 59.25 (→ did not advance, 23rd place)

Women's 200m Freestyle

- Sofia Dara

- Heat — 2:09.42 (→ did not advance, 23rd place)

Women's 400m Freestyle

- Sofia Dara

- Heat — 4:31.76 (→ did not advance, 20th place)

Women's 800m Freestyle

- Sofia Dara

- Heat — DNS (→ did not advance, no ranking)

== Water polo ==
Men's Team Competition

- Preliminary Round (Group B)

- Lost to United States (5-12)
- Lost to Spain (9-12)
- Drew with Brazil (9-9)

- Final Round (Group E)

- Defeated Canada (11-8)
- Defeated Japan (14-7)
- Drew with Italy (8-8)
- Defeated China (10-9) → 8th place

- Team Roster

- Ioannis Vossos
- Spyros Capralos
- Sotirios Stathakis
- Andreas Gounas
- Kiriakos Giannopoulos
- Aristidis Kefalogiannis
- Anastasios Papanastasiou
- Dimitrios Seletopoulos
- Antonios Aronis
- Markellos Sitarenios
- George Mavrotas
- Xenofon Moudatsios
- Stavros Giannopoulos
