= Jochen Fraatz =

German handball player (born 1963)

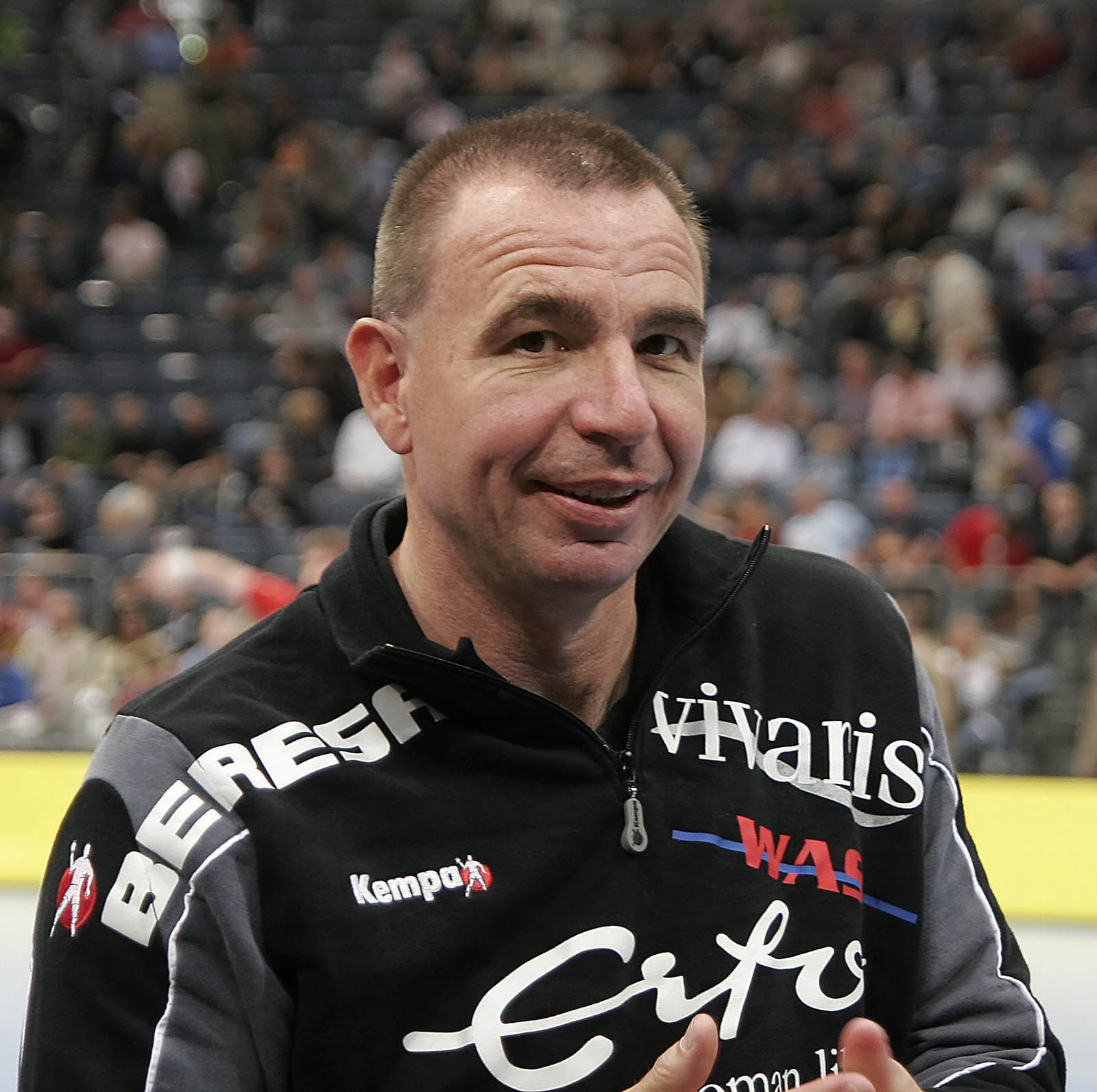
- Fraatz in 2007

Personal information
- Born: 14 May 1963 (age 63) Cuxhaven, West Germany
- Height: 1.86 m (6 ft 1 in)

Sport
- Sport: Handball
- Position: Left wing
Medal record
Men's handball
Representing West Germany
Olympic Games
Silver medal – second place	1984 Los Angeles	Team

Jochen Fraatz (born 14 May 1963) is a former German handball player who competed in the 1984 Summer Olympics and in the 1992 Summer Olympics.

In 1984 he was a member of the West German handball team which won the silver medal. He played all six matches and scored twenty goals.

Eight years later he was part of the German team which finished tenth. He played all six matches and scored sixteen goals.
