= Ekkhard Schmidt-Opper =

German field hockey player

Personal information
- Born: 29 January 1961 (age 65) Frickhofen, Dornburg, Hessen
- Height: 185 cm (6 ft 1 in)
- Weight: 80 kg (176 lb)

Sport
- Sport: Field hockey
Medal record
Men's field hockey
Representing West Germany
Olympic Games
Silver medal – second place	1984 Los Angeles	Team competition
Silver medal – second place	1988 Seoul	Team competition

Ekkhard Schmidt-Opper (born 29 January 1961) is a German former field hockey player who competed in the 1984 Summer Olympics and in the 1988 Summer Olympics.
