= Beate Deininger =

German field hockey player

Personal information
- Born: 24 January 1962 (age 64) Frankfurt, West Germany
- Height: 166 cm (5 ft 5 in)
- Weight: 54 kg (119 lb)

Sport
- Sport: Field hockey
Medal record
Women's field hockey
Representing West Germany
Olympic Games
Silver medal – second place	1984 Los Angeles	Team competition

Beate Deininger (born 24 January 1962) is a German female former field hockey player who competed in the 1984 Summer Olympics. She was born in Frankfurt.
