= Christian Bassemir =

German field hockey player

Olympic medal record

Men's Field Hockey

Representing West Germany
Silver medal – second place	1984 Los Angeles	Team competition

Christian Bassemir (born 13 March 1956) is a former field hockey goalkeeper from West Germany, who was a member of the West German team that won the silver medal at the 1984 Summer Olympics in Los Angeles, California. He played club hockey for Hockey-Club Heidelberg.
