= Gabriela Schöwe =

German field hockey player

Gaby Schöwe
Personal information
- Full name: Gabriela Schöwe
- Born: Gabriela Schley; 26 February 1964 (age 62) Hamburg, West Germany
- Height: 165 cm (5 ft 5 in)
- Weight: 59 kg (130 lb)

Sport
- Sport: Field hockey
Medal record
Women's field hockey
Representing West Germany
Olympic Games
Silver medal – second place	1984 Los Angeles	Team competition

Gabriela "Gaby" Schöwe (née Schley; born 26 February 1964 in Hamburg) is a German female former field hockey player who competed in the 1984 Summer Olympics and in the 1988 Summer Olympics.
