= Paolo Falchini =

Italian swimmer

Personal information
- Born: June 20, 1964 (age 62)

Sport
- Sport: Swimming
Medal record
Representing Italy
Mediterranean Games
Gold medal – first place	1983 Casablanca	200m backstroke

Paolo Falchini (born 20 June 1964) is an Italian former swimmer who competed in the 1984 Summer Olympics.
