= Salvador Salguero (swimmer) =

Salvadoran swimmer (born 1967)

Personal information
- Born: 4 August 1967 (age 58)

Sport
- Sport: Swimming

Salvador Salguero (born 4 August 1967) is a Salvadoran swimmer. He competed in two events at the 1984 Summer Olympics.
