= Rainer Hoppe =

German water polo player

Personal information
- Born: January 26, 1962 (age 64) Duisburg, West Germany

Sport
- Sport: Water polo
Medal record
Representing West Germany
Olympic Games
Bronze medal – third place	1984 Los Angeles	Team competition
World Championships
Bronze medal – third place	1982 Guayaquil	Team competition
European Championships
Bronze medal – third place	1985 Sofia	Team competition

Rainer Hoppe (born 26 January 1962) is a German former water polo player who competed in the 1984 Summer Olympics.

== See also ==
- List of Olympic medalists in water polo (men)
- List of World Aquatics Championships medalists in water polo
