= Markku Slawyk =

German field hockey player

Personal information
- Born: 8 May 1962 (age 64)
Medal record
Men's Field Hockey
Representing West Germany
Olympic Games
Silver medal – second place	1984 Los Angeles	Team competition

Markku Slawyk (born 8 May 1962) is a former field hockey player from West Germany, who was a member of the West German team that won the silver medal at the 1984 Summer Olympics in Los Angeles, California. After his career, he became a field hockey coach in his native country.
