= Werner Obschernikat =

German water polo player

Personal information
- Born: July 9, 1955 (age 70) Duisburg, West Germany

Sport
- Sport: Water polo
Medal record
Representing West Germany
Water polo
Bronze medal – third place	1984 Los Angeles	Team competition
World Championships
Bronze medal – third place	1982 Guayaquil	Team competition
European Championships
Gold medal – first place	1981 Split	Team competition
Bronze medal – third place	1985 Sofia	Team competition

Werner Obschernikat (born 9 July 1955) is a German former water polo player who competed in the 1976 Summer Olympics, in the 1984 Summer Olympics, and in the 1988 Summer Olympics. He won a bronze medal in water polo.

== See also ==
- List of Olympic medalists in water polo (men)
- List of World Aquatics Championships medalists in water polo
