= Thomas Gunst =

German field hockey player

Personal information
- Born: July 26, 1959 (age 66) Bad Dürkheim, West Germany
Medal record
Men's Field Hockey
Representing West Germany
Olympic Games
Silver medal – second place	1984 Los Angeles	Team competition

Thomas Gunst (born July 26, 1959 in Bad Dürkheim) is a former field hockey player from West Germany, who was a member of the West German team that won the silver medal at the 1984 Summer Olympics in Los Angeles, California.
