= Ricardo Aldabe =

Spanish swimmer

Personal information
- Born: 7 March 1965 (age 61)

Sport
- Sport: Swimming

Ricardo Aldabe (born 7 March 1965) is a Spanish former swimmer who competed in the 1984 Summer Olympics. He is married to Kathrine Bomstad.
