= Ibrahim El-Baba =

Lebanese swimmer

Personal information
- Full name: Ibrahim El-Baba

Sport
- Sport: Swimming

Ibrahim El-Baba is a Lebanese swimmer. He competed at the 1980 Summer Olympics and the 1984 Summer Olympics.
