= Dirk Theismann =

German water polo player

Personal information
- Born: June 8, 1963 (age 63) Hamm, West Germany

Sport
- Sport: Water polo
Medal record
Representing West Germany
Olympic Games
Bronze medal – third place	1984 Los Angeles	Team competition

Dirk Theismann (born 8 June 1963) is a German former water polo player who competed in the 1984 Summer Olympics, in the 1988 Summer Olympics, and in the 1992 Summer Olympics.

== See also ==
- List of Olympic medalists in water polo (men)
