= Dirk Brinkmann =

German field hockey player

Personal information
- Born: 2 October 1964 (age 61)
Medal record
Men's Field Hockey
Representing West Germany
Olympic Games
Silver medal – second place	1984 Los Angeles	Team competition
Silver medal – second place	1988 Seoul	Team competition

Dirk Brinkmann (born 2 October 1964) is a former West German field hockey player who competed at two Summer Olympics. On both occasions he won the silver medal with his team at the 1984 Summer Olympics and 1988 Summer Olympics. He was born in Duisburg, Nordrhein-Westfalen.
