= Volker Fried =

German field hockey player (born 1961)

Personal information
- Born: 1 February 1961 (age 65) Osnabrück, Niedersachsen
- Height: 184 cm (6 ft 0 in)
- Weight: 78 kg (172 lb)

Sport
- Sport: Field hockey
Medal record
Men's Field Hockey
Olympic Games
Representing West Germany
Silver medal – second place	1984 Los Angeles	Team competition
Silver medal – second place	1988 Seoul	Team competition
Representing Germany
Gold medal – first place	1992 Barcelona	Team competition

Volker Fried (born 1 February 1961 in Osnabrück, Niedersachsen) is a former field hockey player from West Germany, who competed at four consecutive Summer Olympics for West and the reunified Germany. He won the gold medal with his team at the 1992 Summer Olympics in Barcelona, after capturing silver at the two previous Olympics in Los Angeles (1984) and Seoul (1988).

Fried earned a total number of 290 international caps for his native country, in the years between 1980 and 1996. He retired from the international scene after the 1996 Summer Olympics in Atlanta, Georgia. After his active career he became a hockey coach at Düsseldorfer HC.
