= Fabrizio Bortolon =

Italian swimmer

Personal information
- Born: November 13, 1964 (age 61)

Sport
- Sport: Swimming
- Strokes: Backstroke
Medal record
Representing Italy
Mediterranean Games
Gold medal – first place	1983 Casablanca	4x100m medley relay
Bronze medal – third place	1983 Casablanca	100m backstroke

Fabrizio Bortolon (born 13 November 1964) is an Italian former swimmer who competed in the 1984 Summer Olympics.
