= Karl-Joachim Hürter =

German hockey player

Olympic medal record

Men's field hockey

Representing West Germany
Silver medal – second place	1984 Los Angeles	Team competition

Karl-Joachim Hürter (born 21 October 1960 in Mayen) is a German former field hockey player who competed in the 1984 Summer Olympics.
