= David Morley (swimmer) =

Bahamian swimmer (born 1965)

Personal information
- Born: 7 September 1965 (age 60)

Sport
- Sport: Swimming

David Morley (born 7 September 1965) is a Bahamian swimmer. He competed in three events at the 1984 Summer Olympics.
