= Ian Collins (swimmer) =

British swimmer (born 1962)

Personal information
- Born: 22 November 1962 (age 63) Wolverhampton, England

Sport
- Sport: Swimming

Ian Collins (born 22 November 1962) is a British former swimmer.

Collins attended Millfield School from 1975 to 1981. He competed in two events at the 1984 Summer Olympics. He represented England in the 200 and 400 metres individual medley events, at the 1982 Commonwealth Games in Brisbane, Queensland, Australia. At the ASA National British Championships he won the 200 metres medley title in 1982.
