= Andreas Behrend =

German swimmer

Personal information
- Born: 27 September 1963 (age 62) Berlin, Germany

Sport
- Sport: Swimming

Andreas Behrend (born 27 September 1963) is a German swimmer. He competed in three events at the 1984 Summer Olympics for West Germany.
