= Reinhard Krull =

German field hockey player

Personal information
- Born: 2 October 1954 (age 71)
Medal record
Men's Field Hockey
Representing West Germany
Olympic Games
Silver medal – second place	1984 Los Angeles	Team competition

Reinhard Krull (born 2 October 1954) is a former field hockey player from West Germany, who was a member of the West German team that won the silver medal at the 1984 Summer Olympics in Los Angeles, California.
