= Jürgen Schröder (water polo) =

German water polo player

Personal information
- Born: December 16, 1960 Hamm, West Germany

Sport
- Sport: Water polo
Medal record
Representing West Germany
Olympic Games
Bronze medal – third place	1984 Los Angeles	Team competition
World Championships
Bronze medal – third place	1982 Guayaquil	Team competition
European Championships
Gold medal – first place	1981 Split	Team competition
Bronze medal – third place	1985 Sofia	Team competition

Jürgen Schröder (born 16 December 1960) is a German water polo player. He competed at the 1984 Summer Olympics.

== See also ==
- List of Olympic medalists in water polo (men)
- List of World Aquatics Championships medalists in water polo
