= Ilias Malamas =

Greek swimmer

Personal information
- Born: 6 August 1966 (age 59)

Sport
- Sport: Swimming

Ilias Malamas (born 5 August 1966) is a Greek swimmer. He competed at the 1984 Summer Olympics and the 1988 Summer Olympics.
