= Stefan Peter (swimmer) =

German swimmer

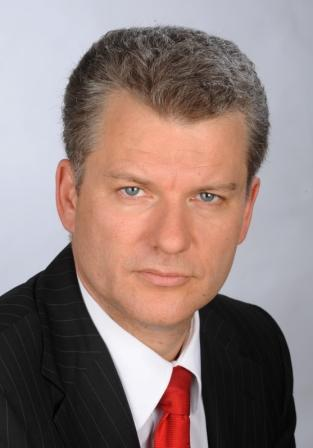

Personal information
- Born: 17 November 1964 (age 61) Mannheim, West Germany

Sport
- Sport: Swimming
Medal record
Representing West Germany
European Championships
Silver medal – second place	1983 Rome	4x100m medley relay

Stefan Peter (born 17 November 1964) is a German swimmer. He competed in three events at the 1984 Summer Olympics for West Germany.
