= Hagen Stamm =

German water polo player

Personal information
- Born: 12 June 1960 (age 66) West Berlin, West Germany

Sport
- Sport: Water polo
Medal record
Representing West Germany
Olympic Games
Bronze medal – third place	1984 Los Angeles	Team competition
World Championships
Bronze medal – third place	1982 Guayaquil	Team competition
European Championships
Gold medal – first place	1981 Split	Team competition
Gold medal – first place	1989 Bonn	Team competition

Hagen Stamm (born 12 June 1960) is a former water polo player from Germany, considered to be one of Germany's best in the last twenty years, having won the bronze medal at the 1984 Summer Olympics in Los Angeles, California, and won two European Championships gold medals in 1981 and 1989.

In 2000 Stamm took over the German men's team as head coach and became fifth at the 2004 Summer Olympics in Athens, Greece. Stamm is the club president of German series champion Wasserfreunde Spandau 04.

== See also ==
- Germany men's Olympic water polo team records and statistics
- List of Olympic medalists in water polo (men)
- List of men's Olympic water polo tournament top goalscorers
- List of World Aquatics Championships medalists in water polo
