= Allan Marsh =

Jamaican swimmer (born 1962)

Personal information
- Born: November 8, 1962 (age 63)

Sport
- Sport: Swimming
- Strokes: Backstroke, butterfly
Medal record
Representing Jamaica
Central American and Caribbean Games
Gold medal – first place	1982 Havana	100m backstroke

Allan Marsh (born 8 November 1962) is a Jamaican former swimmer who competed in the 1984 Summer Olympics.
