= Roland Freund =

German water polo player

Personal information
- Born: June 17, 1955 (age 71) Timisoara, Romania
- Home town: West Berlin, West Germany

Sport
- Sport: Water polo
Medal record
Representing West Germany
Olympic Games
Bronze medal – third place	1984 Los Angeles	Team competition
World Championships
Bronze medal – third place	1982 Guayaquil	Team competition
European Championships
Gold medal – first place	1981 Split	Team competition

Roland Freund (born 17 June 1955) is a German former water polo player who competed in the 1976 Summer Olympics and in the 1984 Summer Olympics.

== See also ==
- List of Olympic medalists in water polo (men)
- List of World Aquatics Championships medalists in water polo
