= Frank Otto (water polo) =

German water polo player

Personal information
- Born: February 10, 1958 (age 68) West Berlin, West Germany

Sport
- Sport: Water polo
Medal record
Representing West Germany
Olympic Games
Bronze medal – third place	1984 Los Angeles	Team competition
World Championships
Bronze medal – third place	1982 Guayaquil	Team competition
European Championships
Gold medal – first place	1981 Split	Team competition
Gold medal – first place	1989 Bonn	Team competition
Bronze medal – third place	1985 Sofia	Team competition

Frank Otto (born 10 February 1958) is a German former water polo player who competed in the 1984 Summer Olympics, in the 1988 Summer Olympics, and in the 1992 Summer Olympics.

== See also ==
- Germany men's Olympic water polo team records and statistics
- List of Olympic medalists in water polo (men)
- List of men's Olympic water polo tournament top goalscorers
- List of World Aquatics Championships medalists in water polo
