= Nicolai Klapkarek =

German swimmer

Nicolaj Klapkarek
Personal information
- Born: 16 July 1965 (age 60) Bochum, West Germany

Sport
- Sport: Swimming

Nicolai Klapkarek (born 16 July 1965) is a German swimmer. He competed in four events at the 1984 Summer Olympics for West Germany.
