= Peter Röhle =

German water polo player

Personal information
- Born: March 6, 1957 (age 69) West Berlin, West Germany

Sport
- Sport: Water polo
Medal record
Representing West Germany
Olympic Games
Bronze medal – third place	1984 Los Angeles	Team competition
World Championships
Bronze medal – third place	1982 Guayaquil	Team competition
European Championships
Gold medal – first place	1981 Split	Team competition
Gold medal – first place	1989 Bonn	Team competition
Bronze medal – third place	1985 Sofia	Team competition

Peter Röhle (born 6 March 1957) is a German former water polo player who competed in the 1976 Summer Olympics, in the 1984 Summer Olympics, in the 1988 Summer Olympics, and in the 1992 Summer Olympics. He was born in West Berlin.

== See also ==
- Germany men's Olympic water polo team records and statistics
- List of Olympic medalists in water polo (men)
- List of men's Olympic water polo tournament goalkeepers
- List of World Aquatics Championships medalists in water polo
