= Kristofer Stivenson =

Greek swimmer (born 1964)

Personal information
- Full name: Kristofer Leo Stivenson
- Nationality: US, Greek
- Born: 4 October 1964 (age 61)
- Height: 180 cm (5 ft 11 in)
- Weight: 72 kg (159 lb)

Sport
- Sport: Swimming

Kristofer Stivenson (born 4 October 1964) is a Greek-American swimmer. He competed in four events at the 1984 Summer Olympics.
