= Malaysia at the 1984 Summer Olympics =

- IOC code: MAS (MAL used at these Games)
- NOC: Olympic Council of Malaysia

in Los Angeles
- Competitors: 21 (20 men, 1 woman) in 5 sports
- Flag bearer: Sabiahmad Abdullah Ahad
- Medals: Gold 0 Silver 0 Bronze 0 Total 0

Summer Olympics appearances (overview)
- 1956; 1960; 1964; 1968; 1972; 1976; 1980; 1984; 1988; 1992; 1996; 2000; 2004; 2008; 2012; 2016; 2020; 2024

Other related appearances
- North Borneo (1956)

Malaysia was represented at the 1984 Summer Olympics in Los Angeles, California, United States by the Olympic Council of Malaysia.

In total, 21 athletes including 20 men and one woman represented Malaysia in five different sports including athletics, cycling, field hockey, shooting and swimming.

== Background ==
The Olympic Council of Malaysia was formed as a merger of the former Olympic committees of Malaya, North Borneo, Sarawak and Singapore in 1964 and Malaysia made their Olympic debut at the 1964 Summer Olympics in Tokyo, Japan. Singapore became independent from Malaysia the following year. They participated in the following three games before taking part in the United States-led boycott of the 1980 Summer Olympics in Moscow, Russian Soviet Federative Socialist Republic, Soviet Union. The 1984 Summer Olympics in Los Angeles, California, United States marked their fifth appearance at the Olympics.

== Competitors ==
In total, 21 athletes represented Malaysia at the 1984 Summer Olympics in Los Angeles, California, United States across five different sports.

Sport	Men	Women	Total
Athletics	2	0	2
Cycling	1	0	1
Field hockey	16	0	16
Shooting	1	0	1
Swimming	0	1	1
Total	20	1	21

== Athletics ==
In total, two Malaysian athletes participated in the athletics events – Nordin Mohamed Jadi in the men's 200 m and the men's 400 m and Batulamai Rajakumar in the men's 800 m and the men's 1,500 m.

Athlete	Event	Heat		Quarterfinal		Semifinal		Final	
Athlete	Event	Result	Rank	Result	Rank	Result	Rank	Result	Rank
Nordin Mohamed Jadi	200 m	21.88	5	did not advance					
Nordin Mohamed Jadi	400 m	47.12	5	did not advance					
Batulamai Rajakumar	800 m	1:48.19	5	did not advance					
Batulamai Rajakumar	1500 m	3:55.19	7	—N/a		did not advance			

== Cycling ==
In total, one Malaysian athlete participated in the cycling events – Rosman Alwi in the men's sprint and the men's 1 km time trial.

Sprint

Athlete	Event	Round 1	Repechage 1	Repechage final 1	Round 2	Repechage 2	1/8 finals	1/8 repechage	1/8 repechage finals	Quarterfinals	Semifinals	Final	
Athlete	Event	Opposition Time	Opposition Time	Opposition Time	Opposition Time	Opposition Time	Opposition Time	Opposition Time	Opposition Time	Opposition Time	Opposition Time	Opposition Time	Rank
Rosman Alwi	Men's sprint	F Schmidtke (FRG); F Orban (BEL); L	M Rainsford (AUS); R Guaves (PHI); W 11.58	Bye	P Vernet (FRA); L	M Barry (GBR); L	did not advance						

Time trial

Athlete	Event	Time	Rank
Rosman Alwi	Men's 1000 m time trial	1:11.03	20

== Field hockey ==
In total, 16 Malaysian athletes participated in the field hockey events – Zulkifli Abbas, Yahya Atan, Michael Chew, Jagjit Singh Chet, Ahmed Fadzil, Stephen van Huizen, Soon Mustafa Karim, Ow Soon Kooi, Sukhvinderjeet Singh Kulwant, Poon Fook Loke, Colin Santa Maria, Shurentheran Murugesan, Kevin Nunis, Tam Chew Seng, Foo Keat Seong and Sarjit Singh in the men's tournament.

Group A

Team	Pts	Pld	W	D	L	GF	GA	GD
Australia	10	5	5	0	0	17	4	+13
West Germany	7	5	3	1	1	12	4	+8
India	7	5	3	1	1	14	9	+5
Spain	4	5	2	0	3	11	12	−1
Malaysia	2	5	1	0	4	6	17	−11
United States	0	5	0	0	5	4	18	−14

Qualified for semifinals

29 July 1984

Australia	5 – 0	Malaysia
Walsh 4 Haselhurst 1

31 July 1984

India	3 – 1	Malaysia
Sharma 3		1 Foo

2 August 1984

Malaysia	4 – 1	United States
Chew 1 Singh 1 Tam 2		2 Arbos; 1 Malbosa

4 August 1984

West Germany	5 – 0	Malaysia
Dopp 2 Reck 1 Blöcher 1 Fischer 1

6 August 1984

Spain	3 – 1	Malaysia
Arbos 2 Cobos 1		1 Kyndan Singh

Ninth place qualifiers

8 August 1984

Canada	1 – 0	Malaysia
Porritt 1

Eleventh and twelfth place match

10 August 1984

Malaysia	3 – 3 (AET) 9 – 8 (PSO)	United States
Murugasen 1 Ow 2 Kulwant Singh 2 Chew 2 Kyndan Singh 2 Van Huizen 2 Santa Maria 1		Spencer 2 Gary Newton 1 Iqbal 1 Gary Newton 2 Michael Newton 2 Spencer 2 Stone 1

== Shooting ==
In total, one Malaysian athlete participated in the shooting events – Sabiahmad Abdullah Ahad in the men's 50 m pistol.

Athlete	Event	Qualification		Final	
Athlete	Event	Points	Rank	Points	Rank
Sabiahmad Abdullah Ahad	50 m pistol	—N/a		537	35

== Swimming ==
In total, one Malaysian athlete participated in the swimming events – Helen Chow in the women's 100 m freestyle, the women's 100 m backstroke, the women's 100 m breaststroke and the women's 200 m individual medley.

Athlete	Event	Round 1		Final B		Final A	
Athlete	Event	Time	Rank	Time	Rank	Time	Rank
Helen Chow	100 m freestyle	1:02.53	38	did not advance			
Helen Chow	100 m backstroke	1:11.30	31	did not advance			
Helen Chow	100 m breaststroke	1:18.99	28	did not advance			
Helen Chow	200 m individual medley	2:29.25	22	did not advance			
