= Field hockey at the 1984 Summer Olympics – Men's tournament =

Men's field hockey at the 1984 Summer Olympics
- Olympic field hockey

Tournament details
- Host country: United States
- City: Los Angeles
- Dates: 29 July – 11 August
- Teams: 12 (from 5 confederations)
- Venue: Weingart Stadium

Final positions
- Champions: Pakistan (3rd title)
- Runner-up: West Germany
- Third place: Great Britain

Tournament statistics
- Matches played: 42
- Goals scored: 157 (3.74 per match)
- Top scorer: (Pakistan) Hassan Sardar (10 goals)

The men's field hockey tournament at the 1984 Summer Olympics was the 15th edition of the field hockey event for men at the Summer Olympics. It was held from 29 July to 11 August 1984.

Pakistan won the gold medal for the third time by defeating West Germany 2–1 in the final. Great Britain won the bronze medal by defeating Australia 3–2.

== Umpires ==
- I Almohandis (EGY)
- Santiago Deo (ESP)
- Ian Faulkner (NZL)
- Louismichel Gillet (FRA)
- Gerrit Hagels (NED)
- Richard Kentwell (NED)
- Rob Lathouwers (NED)
- Jack Marjanovic (AUS)
- Dennis Meredith (AUS)
- Graham Nash (ENG)
- Obaidullah (IND)
- K O'Connor (CAN)
- J Perera (SRI)
- Alain Renaud (FRA)
- Iwo Sakaida (JPN)
- Horacio Servetto (ARG)
- Alexander Stelter (FRG)
- Shams-uz Zamman (PAK)

== Preliminary round ==
=== Group A ===
Pos	Team	Pld	W	D	L	GF	GA	GD	Pts	Qualification
1	Australia	5	5	0	0	17	4	+13	10	Semi-finals
2	West Germany	5	3	1	1	12	4	+8	7	Semi-finals
3	India	5	3	1	1	14	9	+5	7	5–8th place semi-finals
4	Spain	5	2	0	3	11	12	−1	4	5–8th place semi-finals
5	Malaysia	5	1	0	4	6	17	−11	2	9–12th place semi-finals
6	United States (H)	5	0	0	5	4	18	−14	0	9–12th place semi-finals

Source: FIH
(H) Hosts

29 July 1984
13:45

Australia	5–0	Malaysia
Walsh 21', 49', 51', 59'; Haselhurst 68'	Report

Umpires:
Iwo Sakaida (JPN)
Gerrit Hagels (NED)

29 July 1984
15:30

Spain	1–3	West Germany
Roca 23'	Report	Fischer 18'; Krull 38'; Peter 50'

Umpires:
Alain Renaud (FRA)
Ian Faulkner (NZL)

29 July 1984
17:15

India	5–1	United States
Kumar 10'; Fernandis 28', 61'; Carvalho 47'; Mohamed 63'	Report	Stone 35+'

Umpires:
Horacio Servetto (ARG)
Rob Lathouwers (NED)

31 July 1984
08:30

Australia	3–1	Spain
Walsh 15'; Haselhurst 42'; Patmore 52'	Report	Roca 30'

Umpires:
Graham Nash (ENG)
Shams-uz Zamman (PAK)

31 July 1984
10:15

West Germany	4–0	United States
Dopp 2', 70+'; Blöcher 24'; Slawyk 33'	Report

Umpires:
K O'Connor (CAN)
J Perera (SRI)

31 July 1984
16:15

India	3–1	Malaysia
Sharma 11', 67', 68'	Report	Foo Keat Seong 21'

Umpires:
Horacio Servetto (ARG)
I Almohandis (EGY)

2 August 1984
08:30

Spain	3–4	India
Arbós 39', 66'; Malgosa 46'	Report	Singh 12'; Fernandis 19', 58'; Mohamed 55'

Umpires:
Gerrit Hagels (NED)
I Almohandis (EGY)

2 August 1984
10:15

Malaysia	4–1	United States
Tam Cheo Sing 16', 18'; SSK. Singh 61'; Chew 68'	Report	Spencer 29'

Umpires:
Alain Renaud (FRA)
J Perera (SRI)

2 August 1984
16:30

Australia	3–0	West Germany
Patmore 13'; Walsh 63'; Haselhurst 66'	Report

Umpires:
Graham Nash (ENG)
Rob Lathouwers (NED)

4 August 1984
08:30

West Germany	5–0	Malaysia
Dopp 20', 63'; Blöcher 27'; Fischer 51'; Reck 64'	Report

Umpires:
Iwo Sakaida (JPN)
Gerrit Hagels (NED)

4 August 1984
10:15

Australia	4–2	India
Davies 10'; Walsh 44', 59'; Batch 46'	Report	Sharma 43'; Carvalho 63'

Umpires:
Alain Renaud (FRA)
J Perera (SRI)

4 August 1984
14:30

Spain	3–1	United States
Roca 21', 39', 43'	Report	G. Newton 12'

Umpires:
Rob Lathouwers (NED)
Shams-uz Zamman (PAK)

6 August 1984
08:30

Australia	2–1	United States
Patmore 15', 58'	Report	Stone 67'

Umpires:
Ian Faulkner (NZL)
Shams-uz Zamman (PAK)

6 August 1984
10:15

Spain	3–1	Malaysia
Cobos 17'; Arbós 34', 70+'	Report	SSK. Singh 12'

Umpires:
Graham Nash (ENG)
K O'Connor (CAN)

6 August 1984
14:30

West Germany	0–0	India
	Report

Umpires:
Alain Renaud (FRA)
Louismichel Gillet (FRA)

=== Group B ===
Pos	Team	Pld	W	D	L	GF	GA	GD	Pts	Qualification
1	Great Britain	5	4	1	0	10	5	+5	9	Semi-finals
2	Pakistan	5	2	3	0	16	7	+9	7	Semi-finals
3	Netherlands	5	3	1	1	16	9	+7	7	5–8th place semi-finals
4	New Zealand	5	1	2	2	10	10	0	4	5–8th place semi-finals
5	Kenya	5	1	0	4	5	14	−9	2	9–12th place semi-finals
6	Canada	5	0	1	4	7	19	−12	1	9–12th place semi-finals

Source: FIH

30 July 1984
13:45

Canada	1–4	Netherlands
Rutledge 32'	Report	P. Van Asbeck 22'; Van Grimbergen 33'; Diepeveen 40'; T. Kruize 45'

Umpires:
Dennis Meredith (AUS)
Louismichel Gillet (FRA)

30 July 1984
15:30

New Zealand	3–3	Pakistan
Daji 5', 68', 70+'	Report	Sardar 15', 46', 51'

Umpires:
Santiago Deo (ESP)
Richard Kentwell (USA)

30 July 1984
17:15

Great Britain	2–1	Kenya
Kerly 13', 63'	Report	Alubaha 33'

Umpires:
Jack Marjanovic (AUS)
Alexander Stelter (FRG)

1 August 1984
08:00

Netherlands	3–1	New Zealand
T. Kruize 17'; J. Kruize 40'; Van Grimbergen 42'	Report	McLeod 52'

Umpires:
Iwo Sakaida (JPN)
Jack Marjanovic (AUS)

1 August 1984
13:45

Kenya	0–3	Pakistan
	Report	H. Khan 16'; Hussain 30'; Sardar 32'

Umpires:
Louismichel Gillet (FRA)
Richard Kentwell (USA)

1 August 1984
15:30

Canada	1–3	Great Britain
Rutledge 67'	Report	Duthie 28'; Kerly 30', 40'

Umpires:
Obaidullah (IND)
Dennis Meredith (AUS)

3 August 1984
09:45

Canada	2–3	Kenya
Rutledge 32', 40'	Report	Saini 21', 43'; Otambo 59'

Umpires:
Alexander Stelter (FRG)
Jack Marjanovic (AUS)

3 August 1984
13:45

Great Britain	1–0	New Zealand
Cattrall 13'	Report

Umpires:
Santiago Deo (ESP)
Obaidullah (IND)

3 August 1984
15:30

Netherlands	3–3	Pakistan
T. Kruize 18'; Van 't Hek 29'; J. Kruize 61'	Report	Hameed 35+'; Sardar 48'; Manzoor 64'

Umpires:
Horacio Servetto (ARG)
Louismichel Gillet (FRA)

5 August 1984
08:00

Kenya	1–4	New Zealand
Otambo 49'	Report	P. Miskimmin 14'; Parkin 58'; Daji 62'; Gallen 69'

Umpires:
Richard Kentwell (USA)
Obaidullah (IND)

5 August 1984
13:45

Netherlands	3–4	Great Britain
Klaassen 52'; Van 't Hek 61'; W. Van Asbeck 63'	Report	Kerly 10', 40'; Batchelor 25'; Cattrall 53'

Umpires:
Dennis Meredith (AUS)
Alexander Stelter (FRG)

5 August 1984
15:30

Canada	1–7	Pakistan
Sandhu 46'	Report	Sardar 1', 34', 49'; Hussain 13', 14', 51'; H. Khan 22'

Umpires:
Horacio Servetto (ARG)
Santiago Deo (ESP)

7 August 1984
08:00

Great Britain	0–0	Pakistan
	Report

Umpires:
Santiago Deo (ESP)
J Perera (SRI)

7 August 1984
15:30

Canada	2–2	New Zealand
Cholakis 4'; Sandhu 66'	Report	Grimshaw 32'; Gallen 35+'

Umpires:
Richard Kentwell (USA)
Alexander Stelter (FRG)

7 August 1984
17:15

Netherlands	3–0	Kenya
Doyer 44'; Diepeveen 67'; Van 't Hek 70+'	Report

Umpires:
Iwo Sakaida (JPN)
Obaidullah (IND)

== Classification round ==
=== Ninth to twelfth place classification ===
9–12th place semi-finals
8 August
Malaysia	0
Canada	1
8 August
United States	1 (2)
Kenya (p.s.o.)	1 (4)

Ninth place
10 August
Canada	0
Kenya (a.e.t.)	1
Eleventh place
10 August
Malaysia (p.s.o.)	3 (9)
United States	3 (8)

==== 9–12th place semi-finals ====
8 August 1984
19:00

Malaysia	0–1	Canada
	Report	Porritt 67'

Umpires:
Shams-uz Zamman (PAK)
Alexander Stelter (FRG)

8 August 1984
21:00

United States	1–1 (a.e.t.)	Kenya
G. Newton 99'	Report	Saini 87'
Penalties
G. Newton (penalty shoot-out scored); Manzar (penalty shoot-out scored)	2–4	(penalty shoot-out scored) Sehmi; (penalty shoot-out scored) Saini; (penalty shoot-out scored) Daved; (penalty shoot-out scored) Panesar

Umpires:
K O'Connor (CAN)
Ian Faulkner (NZL)

==== Eleventh place game ====
10 August 1984
08:00

Malaysia	3–3 (a.e.t.)	United States
Ow Soon Kooi 19', 67'; Murugasen 80'	Report	Spencer 41', 49'; G. Newton 97'
Penalties
Santa Maria (penalty shoot-out scored); Van Huizen (penalty shoot-out scored); SK. Singh (penalty shoot-out scored); SSK. Singh (penalty shoot-out scored); Chew (penalty shoot-out scored); Santa Maria (penalty shoot-out missed); Van Huizen (penalty shoot-out scored); SK. Singh (penalty shoot-out scored); SSK. Singh (penalty shoot-out scored); Chew (penalty shoot-out scored)	9–8	(penalty shoot-out scored) Stone; (penalty shoot-out scored) M. Newton; (penalty shoot-out scored) G. Newton; (penalty shoot-out scored) Spencer; (penalty shoot-out missed) Iqbal; (penalty shoot-out missed) Stone; (penalty shoot-out scored) M. Newton; (penalty shoot-out scored) G. Newton; (penalty shoot-out scored) Spencer; (penalty shoot-out scored) Iqbal

Umpires:
I Almohandis (EGY)
K O'Connor (CAN)

==== Ninth place game ====
10 August 1984
13:15

Canada	0–1 (a.e.t.)	Kenya
	Report	Alubaha 93'

Umpires:
Obaidullah (IND)
Shams-uz Zamman (PAK)

=== Fifth to eighth place classification ===
5–8th place semi-finals
9 August
Spain	0 (4)
Netherlands (p.s.o.)	0 (10)
9 August
India	1
New Zealand	0

Fifth place
11 August
Netherlands	2
India	5
Seventh place
11 August
Spain	0
New Zealand	1

==== 5–8th place semi-finals ====
9 August 1984
08:00

India	1–0	New Zealand
Sharma 54'	Report

Umpires:
Dennis Meredith (AUS)
Iwo Sakaida (JPN)

9 August 1984
09:45

Spain	0–0 (a.e.t.)	Netherlands
	Report
Penalties
Arbós (penalty shoot-out missed); Malgosa (penalty shoot-out scored); De Paz (penalty shoot-out scored); Cabot (penalty shoot-out missed); Roca (penalty shoot-out missed); Arbós (penalty shoot-out scored); Malgosa (penalty shoot-out scored); De Paz (penalty shoot-out missed); Cabot (penalty shoot-out missed); Roca (penalty shoot-out missed)	4–10	(penalty shoot-out scored) Kruize; (penalty shoot-out scored) Doyer; (penalty shoot-out scored) Van Grimbergen; (penalty shoot-out scored) Van 't Hek; (penalty shoot-out scored) Hartog; (penalty shoot-out scored) Kruize; (penalty shoot-out scored) Doyer; (penalty shoot-out scored) Van Grimbergen; (penalty shoot-out scored) Van 't Hek; (penalty shoot-out scored) Hartog

Umpires:
Graham Nash (ENG)
J Perera (SRI)

==== Seventh place game ====
10 August 1984
15:00

Spain	0–1	New Zealand
	Report	Parkin 37'

Umpires:
Rob Lathouwers (NED)
Richard Kentwell (USA)

==== Fifth place game ====
11 August 1984
09:15

Netherlands	2–5	India
Diepeveen 5'; Van 't Hek 9'	Report	Fernandis 2', 19'; Sharma 36'; Mohamed 48'; Iqbal 53'

Umpires:
Jack Marjanovic (AUS)
Graham Nash (ENG)

== Medal round ==
Semi-finals
9 August
West Germany	1
Great Britain	0
9 August
Australia	0
Pakistan	1

Gold medal match
11 August
West Germany	1
Pakistan	2
Bronze medal match
11 August
Great Britain	3
Australia	2

=== Semi-finals ===
9 August 1984
15:00

Australia	0–1	Pakistan
	Report	Sardar 22'

Umpires:
Horacio Servetto (ARG)
Louismichel Gillet (FRA)

9 August 1984
16:45

West Germany	1–0	Great Britain
Schmidt-Opper 47'	Report

Umpires:
Alain Renaud (FRA)
Santiago Deo (ESP)

=== Bronze medal match ===
11 August 1984
11:15

Australia	2–3	Great Britain
Davies 18'; Patmore 29'	Report	Dodds 4'; Barber 48'; Kerly 54'

Umpires:
Gerrit Hagels (NED)
Iwo Sakaida (JPN)

=== Gold medal match ===
11 August 1984
13:15

West Germany	1–2 (a.e.t.)	Pakistan
Peter 44'	Report	Sardar 50'; K. Khan 82'

Umpires:
Horacio Servetto (ARG)
Santiago Deo (ESP)

== Statistics ==
=== Final standings ===
1. Pakistan
2. West Germany
3. Great Britain
4. Australia
5. India
6. Netherlands
7. New Zealand
8. Spain
9. Kenya
10. Canada
11. Malaysia
12. United States

=== Goalscorers ===
There were 153 goals scored in 42 matches, for an average of 3.64 goals per match.

10 goals

- (Pakistan) Hasan Sardar

8 goals

- (Australia) Terry Walsh

7 goals

- (United Kingdom) Sean Kerly

6 goals

- (India) Mervyn Fernandis
- (India) Vineet Sharma

5 goals

- (Australia) Nigel Patmore
- (Pakistan) Manzoo Hussain
- (Spain) Carlos Roca

4 goals

- (Canada) Michael Rutledge
- (Netherlands) Tom van 't Hek
- (New Zealand) Peter Daji
- (Spain) Jaime Arbos
- (West Germany) Heiner Dopp

3 goals

- (Australia) Peter Haselhurst
- (India) Mohamed Shahid
- (Netherlands) Cees Diepeveen
- (Netherlands) Ties Kruize
- (United States) Brian Spencer

2 goals

- (Australia) Craig Davies
- (Canada) Neki Sandhu
- (United Kingdom) Bob Cattrall
- (India) Carvalho
- (Kenya) Chris Otambo
- (Kenya) Parminder Singh Saini
- (Malaysia) Soon Ow
- (Malaysia) Sarjit Singh
- (Malaysia) Cheo Tam
- (Netherlands) Maarten van Grimbergen
- (Netherlands) Jan Kruize
- (New Zealand) Laurence Gallen
- (New Zealand) Arthur Parkin
- (Pakistan) Hanif Khan
- (United States) Andrew Stone
- (West Germany) Stefan Blöcher
- (West Germany) Carsten Fischer
- (West Germany) Michael Peter

1 goal

- (Australia) Colin Batch
- (Canada) Ernest Cholakis
- (Canada) Trevor Porritt
- (United Kingdom) Paul Barber
- (United Kingdom) Stephen Batchelor
- (United Kingdom) Richard Dodds
- (United Kingdom) James Duthie
- (India) Zafar Iqbal
- (India) Charanjit Kumar
- (India) Hardeep Singh
- (Kenya) Lucas Alubaha
- (Malaysia) Michael Chew
- (Malaysia) Keat Foo
- (Malaysia) Shurentheran Murugasen
- (Netherlands) Peter van Asbeck
- (Netherlands) Williem van Asbeck
- (Netherlands) Theo Doyer
- (Netherlands) René Klaassen
- (New Zealand) Stuart Grimshaw
- (New Zealand) Grant McLeod
- (New Zealand) Peter Miskimmin
- (Pakistan) Khalid Hamid
- (Pakistan) Kaleemullah Khan
- (Spain) Ignacio Cobos
- (Spain) Santiago Malgosa
- (United States) Gary Newton
- (West Germany) Reinhard Krull
- (West Germany) Thomas Reck
- (West Germany) Ekkhard Schmidt-Opper
- (West Germany) Markku Slawyk

Source: FIH
