= United States at the 1984 Summer Olympics =

- Flag of the United States
- IOC code: USA
- NOC: United States Olympic Committee

in Los Angeles
- Competitors: 522 (339 men and 183 women) in 25 sports
- Flag bearer: Ed Burke
- Medals Ranked 1st: Gold 83 Silver 61 Bronze 30 Total 174

Summer Olympics appearances (overview)
- 1896; 1900; 1904; 1908; 1912; 1920; 1924; 1928; 1932; 1936; 1948; 1952; 1956; 1960; 1964; 1968; 1972; 1976; 1980; 1984; 1988; 1992; 1996; 2000; 2004; 2008; 2012; 2016; 2020; 2024; 2028

Other related appearances
- 1906 Intercalated Games

The United States was the host nation of the 1984 Summer Olympics in Los Angeles, California. It was the nineteenth time that Team USA participated, having boycotted the 1980 Summer Olympics four years earlier. 522 competitors, 339 men and 183 women, took part in 217 events in 25 sports.

These Olympic Games were unique for the United States in that the host state was California, the home state of the country's president, Ronald Reagan, who himself opened the Games, becoming the first American president to open a Summer Olympics, and also any Olympic games in the United States. Reagan was governor of the state from 1967 to 1975. It was not until the 2002 Winter Olympics in Salt Lake City that an American president opened a Winter Olympics in the United States.

The United States topped the medal count for the first time since 1968, winning a record 83 gold medals and surpassing the Soviet Union's total of 80 golds at the 1980 Summer Olympics.

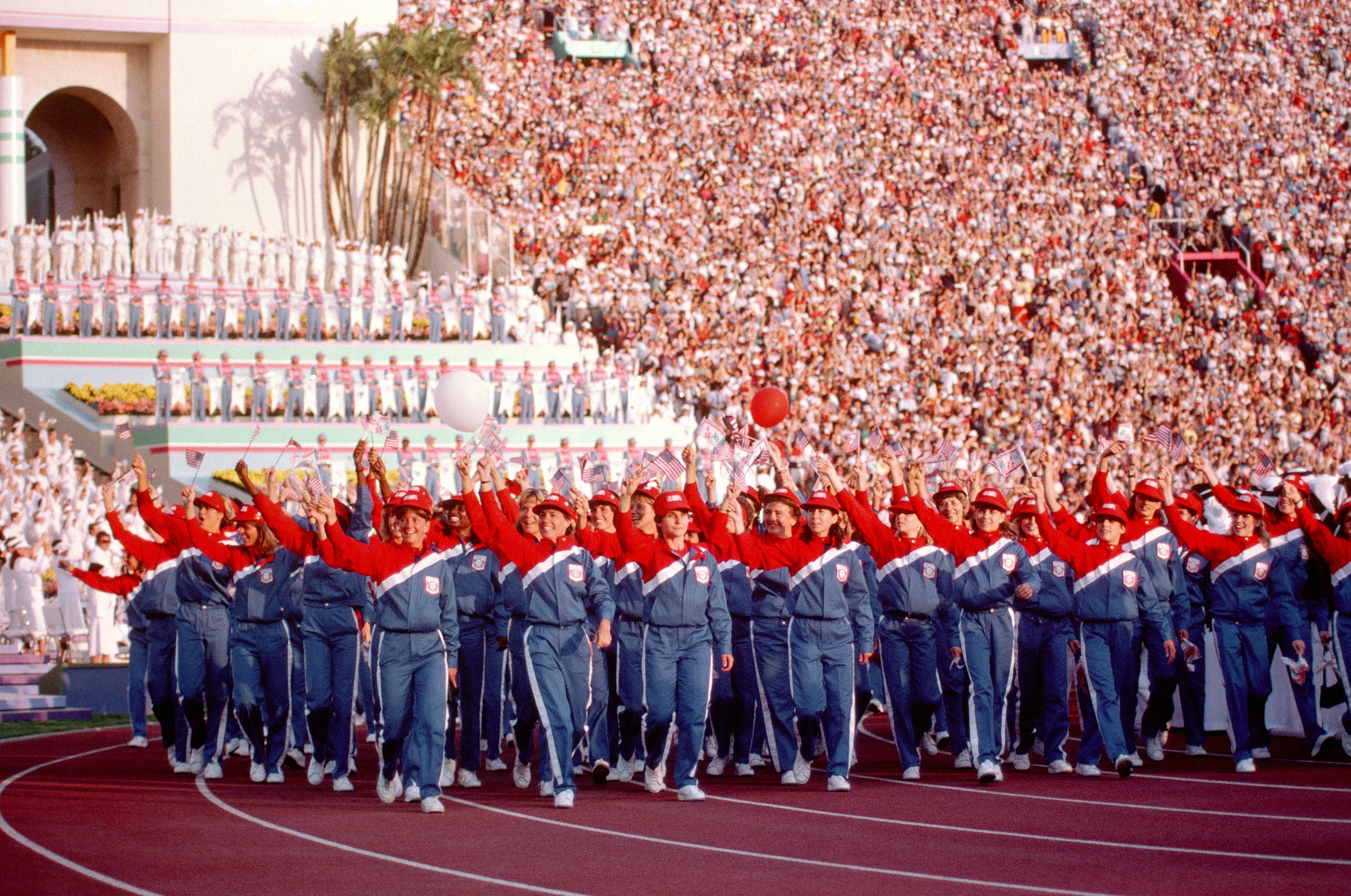
U.S. delegation during the opening ceremony for the 1984 Summer Olympics

== Medalists ==
The following U.S. competitors won medals at the games. In the discipline sections below, the medalists' names are bolded.

Medal	Name	Sport	Event	Date
Gold	Alexi Grewal	Cycling	Men's road race	July 29
Gold	Connie Carpenter-Phinney	Cycling	Women's road race	July 29
Gold	Steve Lundquist	Swimming	Men's 100 meter breaststroke	July 29
Gold	Nancy Hogshead	Swimming	Women's 100 meter freestyle	July 29
Gold	Carrie Steinseifer	Swimming	Women's 100 meter freestyle	July 29
Gold	Tracy Caulkins	Swimming	Women's 400 meter individual medley	July 29
Gold	Ed Etzel	Shooting	Men's 50 meter rifle prone	July 30
Gold	Jeff Float; Geoff Gaberino^{[a]} Bruce Hayes; Mike Heath; David Larson; Richard Saeger^{[a]}	Swimming	Men's 4 × 200 meter freestyle relay	July 30
Gold	Mary Wayte	Swimming	Women's 200 meter freestyle	July 30
Gold	Bart Conner; Timothy Daggett; Mitchell Gaylord; James Hartung; Scott Johnson; Peter Vidmar	Gymnastics	Men's team all-around	July 31
Gold	Pat Spurgin	Shooting	Women's 10 meter air rifle	July 31
Gold	Rowdy Gaines	Swimming	Men's 100 meter freestyle	July 31
Gold	Rick Carey	Swimming	Men's 200 meter backstroke	July 31
Gold	Tiffany Cohen	Swimming	Women's 400 meter freestyle	July 31
Gold	Theresa Andrews	Swimming	Women's 100 meter backstroke	July 31
Gold	Nancy Hogshead; Jenna Johnson; Carrie Steinseifer; Jill Sterkel^{[a]} Dara Torres; Mary Wayte^{[a]}	Swimming	Women's 4 × 100 meter freestyle relay	July 31
Gold	Steve Hegg	Cycling	Individual pursuit	August 1
Gold	Steve Fraser	Wrestling	Greco-Roman 90 kg	August 1
Gold	George DiCarlo	Swimming	Men's 400 meter freestyle	August 2
Gold	Matt Biondi; Chris Cavanaugh; Rowdy Gaines; Mike Heath; Tom Jager^{[a]} Robin Leamy^{[a]}	Swimming	Men's 4 × 100 meter freestyle relay	August 2
Gold	Mary T. Meagher	Swimming	Women's 100 meter butterfly	August 2
Gold	Jeff Blatnick	Wrestling	Greco-Roman +100 kg	August 2
Gold	Mark Gorski	Cycling	Sprint	August 3
Gold	Bruce Davidson; Torrance Fleischmann; Michael Plumb; Karen Stives	Equestrian	Team eventing	August 3
Gold	Mary Lou Retton	Gymnastics	Women's individual all-around	August 3
Gold	Rick Carey	Swimming	Men's 100 meter backstroke	August 3
Gold	Tiffany Cohen	Swimming	Women's 800 meter freestyle	August 3
Gold	Tracy Caulkins	Swimming	Women's 200 meter individual medley	August 3
Gold	Theresa Andrews; Tracy Caulkins; Nancy Hogshead; Jenna Johnson^{[a]} Mary T. Meagher; Betsy Mitchell^{[a]} Susan Rapp^{[a]} Carrie Steinseifer^{[a]}	Swimming	Women's 4 × 100 meter medley relay	August 3
Gold	Carl Lewis	Athletics	Men's 100 meters	August 4
Gold	Al Joyner	Athletics	Men's triple jump	August 4
Gold	Peter Vidmar	Gymnastics	Men's pommel horse	August 4
Gold	Bart Conner	Gymnastics	Men's parallel bars	August 4
Gold	Betsy Beard; Carol Bower; Jeanne Flanagan; Carie Graves; Kathryn Keeler; Harriet Metcalf; Kristine Norelius; Shyril O'Steen; Kristen Thorsness	Rowing	Women's eight	August 4
Gold	Matthew Dryke	Shooting	Skeet	August 4
Gold	Mike O'Brien	Swimming	Men's 1500 meter freestyle	August 4
Gold	Rick Carey; Rowdy Gaines; Mike Heath^{[a]} Tom Jager^{[a]} Steve Lundquist; Pablo Morales; Richard Schroeder^{[a]} Dave Wilson^{[a]}	Swimming	Men's 4 × 100 meter medley relay	August 4
Gold	Mary T. Meagher	Swimming	Women's 200 meter butterfly	August 4
Gold	Edwin Moses	Athletics	Men's 400 meter hurdles	August 5
Gold	Evelyn Ashford	Athletics	Women's 100 meters	August 5
Gold	Joan Benoit	Athletics	Women's marathon	August 5
Gold	Julianne McNamara	Gymnastics	Women's uneven bars	August 5
Gold	Paul Enquist; Bradley Lewis	Rowing	Men's double sculls	August 5
Gold	Roger Kingdom	Athletics	Men's 110 meter hurdles	August 6
Gold	Carl Lewis	Athletics	Men's long jump	August 6
Gold	Valerie Brisco-Hooks	Athletics	Women's 400 meters	August 6
Gold	United States women's national basketball team: Cathy Boswell; Denise Curry; Anne Donovan; Teresa Edwards; Lea Henry; Janice Lawrence; Pamela McGee; Carol Menken-Schaudt; Cheryl Miller; Kim Mulkey; Cindy Noble; Lynette Woodard	Basketball	Women's tournament	August 7
Gold	Leslie Burr Howard; Joseph Fargis; Conrad Homfeld; Melanie Smith	Equestrian	Team jumping	August 7
Gold	Carl Lewis	Athletics	Men's 200 meters	August 8
Gold	Alonzo Babers	Athletics	Men's 400 meters	August 8
Gold	Greg Louganis	Diving	Men's 3 meter springboard	August 8
Gold	William Carl Buchan; Jonathan McKee	Sailing	Flying Dutchman	August 8
Gold	William Earl Buchan; Steven Erickson	Sailing	Star	August 8
Gold	Rod Davis; Robbie Haines; Ed Trevelyan	Sailing	Soling	August 8
Gold	Valerie Brisco-Hooks	Athletics	Women's 200 meters	August 9
Gold	Candy Costie; Tracie Ruiz	Synchronized swimming	Duet	August 9
Gold	Bobby Weaver	Wrestling	Freestyle 48 kg	August 9
Gold	Randy Lewis	Wrestling	Freestyle 62 kg	August 9
Gold	Ed Banach	Wrestling	Freestyle 90 kg	August 9
Gold	Benita Fitzgerald-Brown	Athletics	Women's 100 meter hurdles	August 10
Gold	United States men's national basketball team: Steve Alford; Patrick Ewing; Vern Fleming; Michael Jordan; Joe Kleine; Jon Koncak; Chris Mullin; Sam Perkins; Alvin Robertson; Wayman Tisdale; Jeff Turner; Leon Wood	Basketball	Men's tournament	August 10
Gold	Dave Schultz	Wrestling	Freestyle 74 kg	August 10
Gold	Bruce Baumgartner	Wrestling	Freestyle +100 kg	August 10
Gold	Darrell Pace	Archery	Men's individual	August 11
Gold	Ron Brown; Sam Graddy; Carl Lewis; Calvin Smith	Athletics	Men's 4 × 100 meter relay	August 11
Gold	Ray Armstead; Alonzo Babers; Walter McCoy*; Antonio McKay; Sunder Nix; Willie Smith*	Athletics	Men's 4 × 400 meter relay	August 11
Gold	Evelyn Ashford; Jeanette Bolden; Alice Brown; Chandra Cheeseborough	Athletics	Women's 4 × 100 meter relay	August 11
Gold	Valerie Brisco-Hooks; Chandra Cheeseborough; Diane Dixon*; Denean Howard*; Sherri Howard; Lillie Leatherwood	Athletics	Women's 4 × 400 meter relay	August 11
Gold	Paul Gonzales	Boxing	Light flyweight	August 11
Gold	Steve McCrory	Boxing	Flyweight	August 11
Gold	Meldrick Taylor	Boxing	Featherweight	August 11
Gold	Pernell Whitaker	Boxing	Lightweight	August 11
Gold	Jerry Page	Boxing	Light welterweight	August 11
Gold	Mark Breland	Boxing	Welterweight	August 11
Gold	Frank Tate	Boxing	Light middleweight	August 11
Gold	Henry Tillman	Boxing	Heavyweight	August 11
Gold	Tyrell Biggs	Boxing	Super heavyweight	August 11
Gold	United States men's national volleyball team: Aldis Berzins; Craig Buck; Rich Duwelius; Dusty Dvorak; Karch Kiraly; Chris Marlowe; Patrick Powers; Steven Salmons; Dave Saunders; Paul Sunderland; Steve Timmons; Marc Waldie	Volleyball	Men's tournament	August 11
Gold	Mark Schultz	Wrestling	Freestyle 82 kg	August 11
Gold	Lou Banach	Wrestling	Freestyle 100 kg	August 11
Gold	Greg Louganis	Diving	Men's 10 meter platform	August 12
Gold	Joseph Fargis	Equestrian	Individual jumping	August 12
Gold	Tracie Ruiz	Synchronized swimming	Solo	August 12
Silver	Rebecca Twigg	Cycling	Women's road race	July 29
Silver	Ruby Fox	Shooting	Women's 25 meter pistol	July 29
Silver	Mike Heath	Swimming	Men's 200 meter freestyle	July 29
Silver	Pablo Morales	Swimming	Men's 100 meter butterfly	July 30
Silver	Cynthia Woodhead	Swimming	Women's 200 meter freestyle	July 30
Silver	Susan Rapp	Swimming	Women's 200 meter breaststroke	July 30
Silver	Betsy Mitchell	Swimming	Women's 100 meter backstroke	July 31
Silver	Pamela Bileck; Michelle Dusserre; Kathy Johnson; Julianne McNamara; Mary Lou Retton; Tracee Talavera	Gymnastics	Women's team all-around	August 1
Silver	Dean Glenesk; Greg Losey; Michael Storm	Modern pentathlon	Team	August 1
Silver	Peter Vidmar	Gymnastics	Men's individual all-around	August 2
Silver	John Mykkanen	Swimming	Men's 400 meter freestyle	August 2
Silver	Jenna Johnson	Swimming	Women's 100 meter butterfly	August 2
Silver	Brent Emery; David Grylls; Steve Hegg; Patrick McDonough; Leonard Nitz	Cycling	Team pursuit	August 3
Silver	Nelson Vails	Cycling	Sprint	August 3
Silver	Karen Stives	Equestrian	Individual eventing	August 3
Silver	Dave Wilson	Swimming	Men's 100 meter backstroke	August 3
Silver	Michelle Richardson	Swimming	Women's 800 meter freestyle	August 3
Silver	Nancy Hogshead	Swimming	Women's 200 meter individual medley	August 3
Silver	Greg Gibson	Wrestling	Greco-Roman 100 kg	August 3
Silver	Sam Graddy	Athletics	Men's 100 meters	August 4
Silver	Mike Conley	Athletics	Men's triple jump	August 4
Silver	Mitchell Gaylord	Gymnastics	Men's vault	August 4
Silver	Charlotte Geer	Rowing	Women's single sculls	August 4
Silver	Virginia Gilder; Joan Lind; Anne Marden; Kelly Rickon; Lisa Rohde	Rowing	Women's quadruple sculls	August 4
Silver	George DiCarlo	Swimming	Men's 1500 meter freestyle	August 4
Silver	Pablo Morales	Swimming	Men's 200 meter individual medley	August 4
Silver	Amy White	Swimming	Women's 200 meter backstroke	August 4
Silver	Danny Harris	Athletics	Men's 400 meter hurdles	August 5
Silver	Alice Brown	Athletics	Women's 100 meters	August 5
Silver	Mary Lou Retton	Gymnastics	Women's vault	August 5
Silver	Julianne McNamara	Gymnastics	Women's floor	August 5
Silver	David Clark; Alan Forney; Jonathan Smith; Phillip Stekl	Rowing	Men's coxless four	August 5
Silver	Michael Bach; Edward Ives; Thomas Kiefer; Gregory Springer; John Stillings	Rowing	Men's coxed four	August 5
Silver	Fred Borchelt; Charles Clapp; Tom Darling; Bruce Ibbetson; Bob Jaugstetter; Chip Lubsen; Chris Penny; Andrew Sudduth; John Terwilliger	Rowing	Men's eight	August 5
Silver	Greg Foster	Athletics	Men's 110 meter hurdles	August 6
Silver	Chandra Cheeseborough	Athletics	Women's 400 meters	August 6
Silver	Kim Gallagher	Athletics	Women's 800 meters	August 6
Silver	Kelly McCormick	Diving	Women's 3 meter springboard	August 6
Silver	Jackie Joyner	Athletics	Women's heptathlon	August 7
Silver	Kirk Baptiste	Athletics	Men's 200 meters	August 8
Silver	Mike Tully	Athletics	Men's pole vault	August 8
Silver	Judi Brown	Athletics	Women's 400 meter hurdles	August 8
Silver	Robert Berland	Judo	Men's –86 kg	August 8
Silver	Scott Steele	Sailing	Windglider	August 8
Silver	John Bertrand	Sailing	Finn	August 8
Silver	Steve Benjamin; Hans Steinfeld	Sailing	470	August 8
Silver	Jay Glaser; Randy Smyth	Sailing	Tornado	August 8
Silver	Mario Martinez	Weightlifting	+110 kg	August 8
Silver	Florence Griffith	Athletics	Women's 200 meters	August 9
Silver	United States women's national volleyball team: Jeanne Beauprey; Carolyn Becker; Linda Chisholm; Rita Crockett; Laura Flachmeier; Debbie Green-Vargas; Flora Hyman; Rose Magers; Kimberly Ruddins; Julie Vollertsen; Paula Weishoff; Susan Woodstra	Volleyball	Women's tournament	August 9
Silver	Mac Wilkins	Athletics	Men's discus throw	August 10
Silver	Michele Mitchell	Diving	Women's 10 meter platform	August 10
Silver	United States men's national water polo team: Doug Burke; Jody Campbell; Peter Campbell; Christopher Dorst; Gary Figueroa; Andrew McDonald; Kevin Robertson; Terry Schroeder; Tim Shaw; John Siman; Jon Svendsen; Joseph Vargas; Craig Wilson	Water polo	Men's tournament	August 10
Silver	Richard McKinney	Archery	Men's individual	August 11
Silver	Michael Carter	Athletics	Men's shot put	August 11
Silver	Leslie Deniz	Athletics	Women's discus throw	August 11
Silver	Virgil Hill	Boxing	Middleweight	August 11
Silver	Barry Davis	Wrestling	Freestyle 57 kg	August 11
Silver	Andrew Rein	Wrestling	Freestyle 68 kg	August 11
Silver	Bruce Kimball	Diving	Men's 10 meter platform	August 12
Silver	Conrad Homfeld	Equestrian	Individual jumping	August 12
Bronze	Daniel Carlisle	Shooting	Trap	July 31
Bronze	Leonard Nitz	Cycling	Individual pursuit	August 1
Bronze	Wanda Jewell	Shooting	Women's 50 meter rifle three positions	August 2
Bronze	James Martinez	Wrestling	Greco-Roman 68 kg	August 3
Bronze	Peter Westbrook	Fencing	Men's sabre	August 4
Bronze	Timothy Daggett	Gymnastics	Men's pommel horse	August 4
Bronze	Mitchell Gaylord	Gymnastics	Men's rings	August 4
Bronze	Mitchell Gaylord	Gymnastics	Men's parallel bars	August 4
Bronze	Edward Liddie	Judo	Men's –60 kg	August 4
Bronze	Ron Kiefel; Clarence Knickman; Davis Phinney; Andrew Weaver	Cycling	Men's team time trial	August 5
Bronze	Mary Lou Retton	Gymnastics	Women's uneven bars	August 5
Bronze	Kathy Johnson	Gymnastics	Women's balance beam	August 5
Bronze	Mary Lou Retton	Gymnastics	Women's floor	August 5
Bronze	Robert Espeseth; Douglas Herland; Kevin Still	Rowing	Men's coxed pair	August 5
Bronze	Earl Jones	Athletics	Men's 800 meters	August 6
Bronze	Brian Diemer	Athletics	Men's 300 meter steeplechase	August 6
Bronze	Christina Seufert	Diving	Women's 3 meter springboard	August 6
Bronze	Guy Carlton	Weightlifting	–110 kg	August 7
Bronze	Thomas Jefferson	Athletics	Men's 200 meters	August 8
Bronze	Antonio McKay	Athletics	Men's 400 meters	August 8
Bronze	Earl Bell	Athletics	Men's pole vault	August 8
Bronze	Ronald Merriott	Diving	Men's 3 meter springboard	August 8
Bronze	John Powell	Athletics	Men's discus throw	August 10
Bronze	Kim Turner	Athletics	Women's 100 meter hurdles	August 10
Bronze	Joni Huntley	Athletics	Women's high jump	August 10
Bronze	Wendy Wyland	Diving	Women's 10 meter platform	August 10
Bronze	United States women's national field hockey team: Beth Anders; Beth Beglin; Regina Buggy; Gwen Cheeseman; Sheryl Johnson; Christine Larson-Mason; Kathleen McGahey; Anita Miller; Leslie Milne; Charlene Morett; Diane Moyer; Marcella Place; Karen Shelton; Brenda Stauffer; Julie Staver; Judy Strong	Field hockey	Women's tournament	August 10
Bronze	Dave Laut	Athletics	Men's shot put	August 11
Bronze	Evander Holyfield	Boxing	Light heavyweight	August 11
Bronze	Greg Barton	Canoeing	Men's K-1 1000 meters	August 11

Medals by sport
Sport	1st place, gold medalist(s)	2nd place, silver medalist(s)	3rd place, bronze medalist(s)	Total
Swimming	21	13	0	**34**
Athletics	16	15	9	**40**
Wrestling	9	3	1	**13**
Boxing	9	1	1	**11**
Gymnastics	5	5	6	**16**
Cycling	4	3	2	**9**
Sailing	3	4	0	**7**
Equestrian	3	2	0	**5**
Shooting	3	1	2	**6**
Rowing	2	5	1	**8**
Diving	2	3	3	**8**
Basketball	2	0	0	**2**
Synchronized swimming	2	0	0	**2**
Archery	1	1	0	**2**
Volleyball	1	1	0	**2**
Judo	0	1	1	**2**
Weightlifting	0	1	1	**2**
Modern pentathlon	0	1	0	**1**
Water polo	0	1	0	**1**
Canoeing	0	0	1	**1**
Fencing	0	0	1	**1**
Field hockey	0	0	1	**1**
Total	83	61	30	174

Medals by day
Day	Date	1st place, gold medalist(s)	2nd place, silver medalist(s)	3rd place, bronze medalist(s)	Total
1	July 29	6	3	0	**9**
2	July 30	3	3	0	**6**
3	July 31	7	1	1	**9**
4	August 1	2	2	1	**5**
5	August 2	4	3	1	**8**
6	August 3	7	7	1	**15**
7	August 4	9	8	5	**22**
8	August 5	5	7	5	**17**
9	August 6	3	4	3	**10**
10	August 7	2	1	1	**4**
11	August 8	6	9	4	**19**
12	August 9	5	2	0	**7**
13	August 10	4	3	5	**12**
14	August 11	17	6	3	**26**
15	August 12	3	2	0	**5**
Total		83	61	30	174

Medals by gender
Gender	1st place, gold medalist(s)	2nd place, silver medalist(s)	3rd place, bronze medalist(s)	Total	Percentage
Male	54	36	21	**111**	63.8%
Female	27	25	9	**61**	35.1%
Mixed	2	0	0	**2**	1.1%
Total	83	61	30	174	100%

Multiple medalists
Name	Sport	1st place, gold medalist(s)	2nd place, silver medalist(s)	3rd place, bronze medalist(s)	Total
Mary Lou Retton	Gymnastics	1	2	2	**5**
Carl Lewis	Athletics	4	0	0	**4**
Mike Heath	Swimming	3	1	0	**4**
Nancy Hogshead	Swimming	3	1	0	**4**
Mitchell Gaylord	Gymnastics	1	1	2	**4**
Valerie Brisco-Hooks	Athletics	3	0	0	**3**
Rick Carey	Swimming	3	0	0	**3**
Tracy Caulkins	Swimming	3	0	0	**3**
Rowdy Gaines	Swimming	3	0	0	**3**
Mary T. Meagher	Swimming	3	0	0	**3**
Carrie Steinseifer	Swimming	3	0	0	**3**
Chandra Cheeseborough	Athletics	2	1	0	**3**
Jenna Johnson	Swimming	2	1	0	**3**
Peter Vidmar	Gymnastics	2	1	0	**3**
Julianne McNamara	Gymnastics	1	2	0	**3**
Pablo Morales	Swimming	1	2	0	**3**
Theresa Andrews	Swimming	2	0	0	**2**
Evelyn Ashford	Athletics	2	0	0	**2**
Alonzo Babers	Athletics	2	0	0	**2**
Tiffany Cohen	Swimming	2	0	0	**2**
Bart Conner	Gymnastics	2	0	0	**2**
Joseph Fargis	Equestrian	2	0	0	**2**
Tom Jager	Swimming	2	0	0	**2**
Greg Louganis	Diving	2	0	0	**2**
Steve Lundquist	Swimming	2	0	0	**2**
Tracie Ruiz	Synchronized swimming	2	0	0	**2**
Mary Wayte	Swimming	2	0	0	**2**
Alice Brown	Athletics	1	1	0	**2**
George DiCarlo	Swimming	1	1	0	**2**
Sam Graddy	Athletics	1	1	0	**2**
Steve Hegg	Cycling	1	1	0	**2**
Conrad Homfeld	Equestrian	1	1	0	**2**
Betsy Mitchell	Swimming	1	1	0	**2**
Susan Rapp	Swimming	1	1	0	**2**
Karen Stives	Equestrian	1	1	0	**2**
Dave Wilson	Swimming	1	1	0	**2**
Timothy Daggett	Gymnastics	1	0	1	**2**
Antonio McKay	Athletics	1	0	1	**2**
Kathy Johnson	Gymnastics	0	1	1	**2**
Leonard Nitz	Cycling	0	1	1	**2**

^{a} - Indicates that the athlete competed in preliminaries but not the final.

== Archery ==
The United States returned to archery competition with a dominant men's team that earned the top two spots. Their women were not as successful against the newly powerful Asian teams from Korea, China, and Japan, but still managed to place an archer in the top eight.

Athlete	Event	Round 1		Round 2		Total	
Athlete	Event	Score	Rank	Score	Rank	Score	Rank
Richard McKinney	Men's	1295	2	1269	2	2564	2nd place, silver medalist(s)
Glenn Meyers	Men's	1246	12	1242	17	2488	12
Darrell Pace	Men's	1317 OR	1	1299	1	2616 OR	1st place, gold medalist(s)
Benita Edds	Women's	1174	36	1192	31	2366	34
Katrina King	Women's	1265	4	1243	11	2508	7
Ruth Rowe	Women's	1223	18	1254	6	2477	12

== Athletics ==
Key

- Note–Ranks given for track events are within the athlete's heat only
- Q = Qualified for the next round
- q = Qualified for the next round as a fastest loser or, in field events, by position without achieving the qualifying target

Men
Road and track events

Athlete	Event	Heat		Quarterfinal		Semifinal		Final	
Athlete	Event	Time	Rank	Time	Rank	Time	Rank	Time	Rank
Ron Brown	100 m	10.58	1 Q	10.40	2 Q	10.34	4 Q	10.26	4
Sam Graddy	100 m	10.29	1 Q	10.15	1 Q	10.27	2 Q	10.19	2nd place, silver medalist(s)
Carl Lewis	100 m	10.32	1 Q	10.04	1 Q	10.14	1 Q	9.99	1st place, gold medalist(s)
Kirk Baptiste	200 m	20.63	1 Q	20.48	1 Q	20.29	1 Q	19.96	2nd place, silver medalist(s)
Thomas Jefferson	200 m	20.63	1 Q	20.47	1 Q	20.40	2 Q	20.26	3rd place, bronze medalist(s)
Carl Lewis	200 m	21.02	1 Q	20.48	1 Q	20.27	1 Q	19.80 OR	1st place, gold medalist(s)
Alonzo Babers	400 m	45.81	1 Q	44.75	1 Q	45.17	2 Q	44.27	1st place, gold medalist(s)
Antonio McKay	400 m	45.55	1 Q	44.72	1 Q	44.92	3 Q	44.71	3rd place, bronze medalist(s)
Sunder Nix	400 m	45.42	1 Q	45.31	2 Q	45.51	4 Q	44.75	5
Johnny Gray	800 m	1:47.19	1 Q	1:45.82	3 Q	1:45.82	3 Q	1:47.89	7
Earl Jones	800 m	1:47.75	1 Q	1:45.44	1 Q	1:44.51	3 Q	1:43.83	3rd place, bronze medalist(s)
John Marshall	800 m	1:47.99	3 Q	1:47.18	5	Did not advance			
Steve Scott	1500 m	3:41.02	2 Q	—N/a		3:35.71	2 Q	3:39.86	10
Jim Spivey	1500 m	3:40.58	2 Q	—N/a		3:36.53	2 Q	3:36.07	5
Don Clary	5000 m	13:44.97	3 Q	—N/a		13:46.02	12	Did not advance	
Steve Lacy	5000 m	13:46.16	4 Q	—N/a		16:46.65	10	Did not advance	
Doug Padilla	5000 m	13:52.56	6 Q	—N/a		13:41.73	6 Q	13:23.56	7
Paul Cummings	10,000 m	29:09.82	9	—N/a				Did not advance	
Pat Porter	10,000 m	28:19.94	7 q	—N/a				28:34.59	15
Craig Virgin	10,000 m	28:37.58	9	—N/a				Did not advance	
Tonie Campbell	110 m hurdles	13.53	1 Q	—N/a		13.56	2 Q	13.55	5
Greg Foster	110 m hurdles	13.24	1 Q	—N/a		13.24	1 Q	13.23	2nd place, silver medalist(s)
Roger Kingdom	110 m hurdles	13.53	1 Q	—N/a		13.24	1 Q	13.20 OR	1st place, gold medalist(s)
Danny Harris	400 m hurdles	49.81	1 Q	—N/a		48.92	1 Q	48.13	2nd place, silver medalist(s)
Tranel Hawkins	400 m hurdles	49.51	1 Q	—N/a		48.94	2 Q	49.42	6
Edwin Moses	400 m hurdles	49.33	1 Q	—N/a		48.51	1 Q	47.75	1st place, gold medalist(s)
Brian Diemer	3000 m steeplechase	8:25.92	1 Q	—N/a		8:18.36	3 Q	8:14.06	3rd place, bronze medalist(s)
John Gregorek	3000 m steeplechase	8:38.43	8 q	—N/a		8:38.19	11	Did not advance	
Henry Marsh	3000 m steeplechase	8:29.33	4 Q	—N/a		8:20.57	4 Q	8:14.25	4
Ron Brown; Sam Graddy; Carl Lewis; Calvin Smith	4 × 100 m relay	38.89	1 Q	—N/a		38.44	1 Q	37.83 WR	1st place, gold medalist(s)
Ray Armstead; Alonzo Babers; Walter McCoy^{[b]} Antonio McKay; Sunder Nix; Willie Smith^{[b]}	4 × 400 m relay	3:01.44	1 Q	—N/a		3:00.19	1 Q	2:57.91	1st place, gold medalist(s)
Pete Pfitzinger	Marathon	—N/a						2:13:53	11
Alberto Salazar	Marathon	—N/a						2:14:49	15
John Tuttle	Marathon	—N/a						DNF	
Marco Evoniuk	20 km walk	—N/a						1:25:42	7
Jim Heiring	20 km walk	—N/a						1:30:20	23
Daniel O'Connor	20 km walk	—N/a						1:35:12	33
Marco Evoniuk	50 km walk	—N/a						DNF	
Vince O'Sullivan	50 km walk	—N/a						4:22:51	14
Carl Schueler	50 km walk	—N/a						3:59:46	6

Field events

Athlete	Event	Qualification		Final	
Athlete	Event	Result	Rank	Result	Rank
Carl Lewis	Long jump	8.30	1 Q	8.54	1st place, gold medalist(s)
Mike McRae	Long jump	7.89	8 q	7.63	11
Larry Myricks	Long jump	8.02	2 Q	8.16	4
Willie Banks	Triple jump	16.59	9 q	16.75	6
Mike Conley	Triple jump	17.36	1 Q	17.18	2nd place, silver medalist(s)
Al Joyner	Triple jump	16.85	3 Q	17.26	1st place, gold medalist(s)
Milton Goode	High jump	2.24	=1 Q	NM	
Doug Nordquist	High jump	2.24	=1 Q	2.29	5
Dwight Stones	High jump	2.24	8Q	2.31	4
Earl Bell	Pole vault	5.45	=1 Q	5.60	3rd place, bronze medalist(s)
Doug Lytle	Pole vault	5.30	=10 q	5.40	6
Mike Tully	Pole vault	5.45	=1 Q	5.65	2nd place, silver medalist(s)
Mike Carter	Shot put	20.69	1 Q	21.09	2nd place, silver medalist(s)
Dave Laut	Shot put	20.01	5 Q	20.97	3rd place, bronze medalist(s)
Augie Wolf	Shot put	20.55	2 Q	20.93	4
Art Burns	Discus throw	62.60	6 Q	64.98	5
John Powell	Discus throw	62.92	4 Q	65.46	3rd place, bronze medalist(s)
Mac Wilkins	Discus throw	65.86	1 Q	66.30	2nd place, silver medalist(s)
Duncan Atwood	Javelin throw	79.34	12 q	78.10	11
Tom Petranoff	Javelin throw	85.96	1 Q	78.40	10
Steve Roller	Javelin throw	75.50	18	Did not advance	
Ed Burke	Hammer throw	67.52	18	Did not advance	
Bill Green	Hammer throw	71.38	10 q	75.60	5
Jud Logan	Hammer throw	71.18	13	Did not advance	

Combined event – Decathlon

Athlete	Event	100 m	LJ	SP	HJ	400 m	110H	DT	PV	JT	1500 m	Points	Rank
Tim Bright	Result	11.22	6.75	13.80	2.00	48.87	14.52	41.74	5.40	53.66	4:49.27	7862	12
Tim Bright	Points	752	767	716	857	857	901	719	1143	681	469	7862	12
John Crist	Result	11.33	6.98	14.05	2.06	48.45	15.01	46.18	4.80	61.88	4:23.78	8130	6
John Crist	Points	726	816	731	909	877	847	803	1005	784	632	8130	6
Jim Wooding	Result	11.04	7.01	13.90	1.97	47.62	14.57	47.38	4.60	57.20	4:28.31	8091	7
Jim Wooding	Points	795	822	722	831	917	896	825	957	726	600	8091	7

Women
Road and track events

Athlete	Event	Heat		Quarterfinal		Semifinal		Final	
Athlete	Event	Time	Rank	Time	Rank	Time	Rank	Time	Rank
Evelyn Ashford	100 m	11.06	1 Q	11.21	1 Q	11.03	1 Q	10.97 OR	1st place, gold medalist(s)
Jeanette Bolden	100 m	11.25	1 Q	11.42	2 Q	11.48	2 Q	11.25	4
Alice Brown	100 m	11.15	1 Q	11.35	1 Q	11.31	1 Q	11.13	2nd place, silver medalist(s)
Valerie Brisco-Hooks	200 m	23.10	1 Q	22.78	2 Q	22.28	1 Q	21.81 OR	1st place, gold medalist(s)
Randy Givens	200 m	22.88	1 Q	22.81	2 Q	22.69	3 Q	22.36	6
Florence Griffith	200 m	22.56	1 Q	22.33	1 Q	22.27	1 Q	22.04	2nd place, silver medalist(s)
Valerie Brisco-Hooks	400 m	51.42	1 Q	—N/a		51.14	1 Q	48.83 OR	1st place, gold medalist(s)
Chandra Cheeseborough	400 m	50.94	1 Q	—N/a		50.32	1 Q	49.05	2nd place, silver medalist(s)
Lillie Leatherwood	400 m	52.05	1 Q	—N/a		50.83	1 Q	50.25	5
Robin Campbell	800 m	2:01.72	1 Q	—N/a		2:01.21	5	Did not advance	
Kim Gallagher	800 m	2:00.37	1 Q	—N/a		2:00.48	1 Q	1:58.63	2nd place, silver medalist(s)
Ruth Wysocki	800 m	2:04.05	2 Q	—N/a		2:02.31	3 Q	2:00.34	6
Missy Kane	1500 m	4:11.86	7	—N/a				Did not advance	
Diana Richburg	1500 m	4:13.35	8	—N/a				Did not advance	
Ruth Wysocki	1500 m	4:06.65	3 Q	—N/a				4:08.32	8
Cindy Bremser	3000 m	8:46.97	2 Q	—N/a				8:42.78	4
Mary Decker	3000 m	8:44.38 OR	1 Q	—N/a				DNF	
Joan Hansen	3000 m	8:58.64	2 Q	—N/a				8:51.53	8
Benita Fitzgerald-Brown	100 m hurdles	13.13	1 Q	—N/a		12.98	1 Q	12.84	1st place, gold medalist(s)
Pam Page	100 m hurdles	13.32	1 Q	—N/a		13.36	4 Q	13.40	8
Kim Turner	100 m hurdles	13.33	2 Q	—N/a		13.11	1 Q	13.06	3rd place, bronze medalist(s)
Sharrieffa Barksdale	400 m hurdles	56.89	2 Q	—N/a		56.19	5	Did not advance	
Judi Brown	400 m hurdles	55.97	1 Q	—N/a		55.97	2 Q	55.20	2nd place, silver medalist(s)
Angela Wright-Scott	400 m hurdles	59.77	6	—N/a		Did not advance			
Evelyn Ashford; Jeanette Bolden; Alice Brown; Chandra Cheeseborough	4 × 100 m relay	42.59	1 Q	—N/a				41.65	1st place, gold medalist(s)
Valerie Brisco-Hooks; Chandra Cheeseborough; Diane Dixon^{[b]} Denean Howard^{[b]} Sherri Howard; Lillie Leatherwood	4 × 400 m relay	3:22.82	1 Q	—N/a				3:18.29 OR	1st place, gold medalist(s)
Joan Benoit	Marathon	—N/a						2:24:52 OR	1st place, gold medalist(s)
Julie Brown	Marathon	—N/a						2:47:33	36
Julie Isphording	Marathon	—N/a						DNF	

^{b} - Indicates the athlete ran in a preliminary round but not the final.

Field events

Athlete	Event	Qualification		Final	
Athlete	Event	Result	Rank	Result	Rank
Jackie Joyner	Long jump	6.76	1 Q	6.77	5
Carol Lewis	Long jump	6.55	6	6.43	9
Angela Thacker	Long jump	6.36	10	6.78	4
Joni Huntley	High jump	1.90	7 Q	1.97	3rd place, bronze medalist(s)
Louise Ritter	High jump	1.90	11 Q	1.91	8
Pam Spencer	High jump	1.90	6 Q	1.85	11
Carol Cady	Shot put	—N/a		17.23	7
Lorna Griffin	Shot put	—N/a		17.00	9
Ramona Pagel	Shot put	—N/a		16.06	11
Leslie Deniz	Discus throw	56.24	4 Q	64.86	2nd place, silver medalist(s)
Laura De Snoo	Discus throw	53.76	11 Q	54.54	10
Lorna Griffin	Discus throw	53.34	12 Q	50.16	12
Karin Smith	Javelin throw	61.38	7 Q	62.06	8
Cathy Sulinski	Javelin throw	59.00	12 q	58.38	10
Lynda Sutfin	Javelin throw	55.92	18	Did not advance	

Combined event – Heptathlon

Athlete	Event	100H	HJ	SP	200 m	LJ	JT	800 m	Points	Rank
Jodi Anderson	Result	14.40	1.65	11.02	DNS				DNF	
Jodi Anderson	Points	817	885	657	DNS				DNF	
Cindy Greiner	Result	13.71	1.83	13.36	24.40	6.15	40.86	2:11.75	6281	4
Cindy Greiner	Points	903	1059	801	900	939	779	900	6281	4
Jackie Joyner	Result	13.63	1.80	14.39	24.05	6.11	44.52	2:13.03	6385	2nd place, silver medalist(s)
Jackie Joyner	Points	914	1031	861	933	930	835	881	6385	2nd place, silver medalist(s)

== Basketball ==
Summary

Team	Event	Preliminary round						Quarterfinal	Semifinal	Final / BM	
Team	Event	Opposition Result	Opposition Result	Opposition Result	Opposition Result	Opposition Result	Rank	Opposition Result	Opposition Result	Opposition Result	Rank
United States men	Men's tournament	China; W 97–49	Canada; W 89–68	Uruguay; W 104–68	France; W 120–62	Spain; W 101–68	1 Q	West Germany; W 78–67	Canada; W 78–59	Spain; W 69–65	1st place, gold medalist(s)
United States women	Women's tournament	Yugoslavia; W 83–55	Australia; W 81–41	South Korea; W 84–47	China; W 91–55	Canada; W 92–61	1 Q	—N/a		South Korea; W 85–55	1st place, gold medalist(s)

=== Men's tournament ===
Roster

Name	Position	Height	Weight	Age	Home Town	Team/School
Steve Alford	Guard	6'1"	163	19	New Castle, Indiana	Indiana
Patrick Ewing	Center	7'0"	248	21	Cambridge, Massachusetts	Georgetown
Vern Fleming	Guard	6'5"	184	22	Queens, New York	Georgia
Michael Jordan	Guard	6'6"	199	21	Wilmington, North Carolina	North Carolina
Joe Kleine	Forward	6'11"	269	22	Slater, Missouri	Arkansas
Jon Koncak	Center	7'0"	250	21	Kansas City, Missouri	Southern Methodist
Chris Mullin	Guard	6'6"	211	20	Brooklyn, New York	St. John's
Sam Perkins	Forward	6'9"	233	23	Latham, New York	North Carolina
Alvin Robertson	Guard	6'4"	193	21	Barberton, Ohio	Arkansas
Wayman Tisdale	Forward	6'9"	259	20	Tulsa, Oklahoma	Oklahoma
Jeff Turner	Forward	6'9"	229	22	Brandon, Florida	Vanderbilt
Leon Wood	Guard	6'3"	190	22	Santa Monica, California	Cal State Fullerton

- Head coach: Bob Knight

Preliminary round

Pos	Team	Pld	W	L	PF	PA	PD	Pts	Qualification
1	United States (H)	5	5	0	511	315	+196	10	Quarterfinals
2	Spain	5	4	1	457	438	+19	9	Quarterfinals
3	Canada	5	3	2	462	401	+61	8	Quarterfinals
4	Uruguay	5	2	3	403	460	−57	7	Quarterfinals
5	China	5	1	4	364	477	−113	6	9th–12th classification round
6	France	5	0	5	383	489	−106	5	9th–12th classification round

Source: FIBA archive
Rules for classification: 1) points; 2) head-to-head points; 3) head-to-head goal average; 4) head-to-head number of points scored.
(H) Hosts

29 July 1984

United States	97–49	China
Scoring by half: 50–29, 47–20

The Forum, Inglewood, California

31 July 1984

United States	89–68	Canada
Scoring by half: 43–28, 46–40

The Forum, Inglewood, California

1 August 1984

United States	104–68	Uruguay
Scoring by half: 58–37, 46–31

The Forum, Inglewood, California

3 August 1984

United States	120–62	France
Scoring by half: 57–25, 63–37

The Forum, Inglewood, California

4 August 1984

United States	101–68	Spain
Scoring by half: 46–41, 55–27

The Forum, Inglewood, California

Quarterfinal

August 6, 1984

United States	78–67	West Germany

The Forum, Inglewood

Semifinal

August 8, 1984

United States	78–59	Canada

The Forum, Inglewood

Gold medal game

August 10, 1984

Spain	65–96	United States

The Forum, Inglewood

=== Women's tournament ===
Roster

- Cathy Boswell
- Denise Curry
- Anne Donovan
- Teresa Edwards
- Lea Henry
- Janice Lawrence
- Pamela McGee
- Carol Menken-Schaudt
- Cheryl Miller
- Kim Mulkey
- Cindy Noble
- Lynette Woodard

Preliminary round

Pos	Team	Pld	W	L	PF	PA	PD	Pts	Qualification
1	United States (H)	5	5	0	431	265	+166	10	Gold medal game
2	South Korea	5	4	1	292	302	−10	9	Gold medal game
3	Canada	5	2	3	313	335	−22	7 (Note: Head-to-head record: Canada 1–0 China)	Bronze medal game
4	China	5	2	3	318	348	−30	7	Bronze medal game
5	Australia	5	1	4	267	317	−50	6 (Note: Head-to-head record: Australia 1–0 Yugoslavia)	
6	Yugoslavia	5	1	4	293	347	−54	6	

Source: FIBA archive
Rules for classification: 1) points; 2) head-to-head points; 3) head-to-head goal average; 4) head-to-head number of points scored.
(H) Hosts
Notes:

30 July 1984

Yugoslavia	55–83	United States
Scoring by half: 29–43, 26–40

The Forum, Inglewood, California

31 July 1984

Australia	47–81	United States
Scoring by half: 28–51, 19–30

The Forum, Inglewood, California

2 August 1984

United States	84–47	South Korea
Scoring by half: 40–20, 44–27

The Forum, Inglewood, California

3 August 1984

China	55–91	United States
Scoring by half: 26–38, 29–53

The Forum, Inglewood, California

5 August 1984

Canada	61–92	United States
Scoring by half: 31–41, 30–51

The Forum, Inglewood, California

Gold medal game

7 August 1984

United States	85–55	South Korea
Scoring by half: 42–27, 43–28

The Forum, Inglewood, California

== Boxing ==
Athlete	Event	Round of 64	Round of 32	Round of 16	Quarterfinal	Semifinal	Final	
Athlete	Event	Opposition Result	Opposition Result	Opposition Result	Opposition Result	Opposition Result	Opposition Result	Rank
Paul Gonzales	Light flyweight	—N/a	Kim (KOR); W 5–0	Bagonza (UGA); W 5–0	Lyon (GBR); W 4–1	Bolivar (VEN); W 5–0	Todisco (ITA); W WO	1st place, gold medalist(s)
Steve McCrory	Flyweight	—N/a	Joseph (GRN); W WO	Garcia (MEX); W RSC	Ayesu (MAW); W 5–0	Can (TUR); W 5–0	Redzepovski (YUG); W 4–1	1st place, gold medalist(s)
Robert Shannon	Bantamweight	Bye	Mwangi (KEN); W 5–0	Moon (KOR); L RSC	Did not advance			=9
Meldrick Taylor	Featherweight	Bye	Talpos (ROU); W 5–0	Camacho (MEX); W 5–0	Wanjau (KEN); W RSC	Catari (VEN); W 5–0	Konyegwachie (NGR); W 5–0	1st place, gold medalist(s)
Pernell Whitaker	Lightweight	Bye	Mendez (NIC); W 5–0	Nyeko (UGA); W 5–0	Gies (FRG); W 5–0	Chun (KOR); W 5–0	Ortiz (PUR); W AB	1st place, gold medalist(s)
Jerry Page	Light welterweight	Bye	Gertel (FRG); W 5–0	Robles (MEX); W 5–0	Kim (KOR); W 4–1	Puzović (YUG); W 5–0	Umponmaha (THA); W 5–0	1st place, gold medalist(s)
Mark Breland	Welterweight	Gordon (CAN); W 5–0	Reyes (PUR); W RSC	Obreja (ROU); W 5–0	Léon (MEX); W KO	Bruno (ITA); W 5–0	An (KOR); W 5–0	1st place, gold medalist(s)
Frank Tate	Light middleweight	Bye	Ayed (SWE); W 5–0	Casamonica (ITA); W 5–0	Kapopo (ZAM); W RSC	Zielonka (FRG); W WO	O'Sullivan (CAN); W 5–0	1st place, gold medalist(s)
Virgil Hill	Middleweight	—N/a	Nebeltt (BAR); W RSC	Schmucher (GBR); W 5–0	Škaro (YUG); W 4–1	Zaoui (ALG); W 5–0	Shin (KOR); L 2–3	2nd place, silver medalist(s)
Evander Holyfield	Light heavyweight	—N/a	Akay (GHA); W RSC	Salman (IRQ); W RSC	Okello (KEN); W KO	Barry (NZL); L DSQ	Did not advance	3rd place, bronze medalist(s)
Henry Tillman	Heavyweight	—N/a	Bye	Singh (IND); W RSC	Taufo'ou (TGA); W RSC	Musone (ITA); W 5–0	DeWit (CAN); W 5–0	1st place, gold medalist(s)
Tyrell Biggs	Super heavyweight	—N/a		Barrientos (PUR); W 5–0	Lewis (CAN); W 5–0	Salihu (YUG); W 5–0	Damiani (ITA); W 4–1	1st place, gold medalist(s)

== Canoeing ==
Men

Athlete	Event	Heat		Repechage		Semifinal		Final	
Athlete	Event	Time	Rank	Time	Rank	Time	Rank	Time	Rank
John Plankenhorn	C-1 500 m	2:07.20	4 R	2:13.18	2 SF	2:04.54	4	Did not advance	
Bruce Merritt	C-1 1000 m	4:22.59	3 QF	—N/a		Bye		4:18.17	7
Bruce Merritt; Bret Young	C-2 500 m	1:53.50	5 SF	—N/a		1:51.49	3 QF	1:50.55	9
Rodney McLain; John Plankenhorn	C-2 1000 m	3:55.35	3 QF	—N/a		Bye		3:52.72	5
Terry White	K-1 500 m	2:04.12	6 R	1:50.89	1 SF	1:50.00	4	Did not advance	
Greg Barton	K-1 1000 m	3:52.08	2 SF	Bye		3:54.18	2 QF	3:47.38	3rd place, bronze medalist(s)
David Halpern; Terry Kent	K-2 500 m	1:39.94	4 R	1:40.87	3 SF	1:38.59	4	Did not advance	
Terry Kent; Terry White	K-2 1000 m	3:30.87	2 SF	Bye		3:29.81	3 QF	3:27.01	4
Norman Bellingham; David Gilman; Dan Schnurrenberger; Chris Spelius	K-4 1000 m	3:15.77	7 R	3:19.72	4	Did not advance			

Women

Athlete	Event	Heat		Semifinal		Final	
Athlete	Event	Time	Rank	Time	Rank	Time	Rank
Shelia Conover	K-1 500 m	2:06.89	4 SF	2:03.79	2 QF	2:02.38	6
Shirley Dery; Leslie Klein	K-2 500 m	1:54.61	4 SF	1:53.69	1 QF	1:49.51	5
Shelia Conover; Shirley Dery; Leslie Klein; Ann Turner	K-4 500 m	—N/a				1:40.49	4

Key: QF – Qualified to medal final; SF – Qualified to semifinal; R – Qualified to repechage

== Cycling ==
Twenty cyclists represented the United States in 1984.

=== Road ===
Men

Athlete	Event	Time	Rank
Alexi Grewal	Road race	4:59:57	1st place, gold medalist(s)
Ron Kiefel	Road race	5:01:47	9
Davis Phinney	Road race	5:01:16	5
Thurlow Rogers	Road race	5:01:16	6
Ron Kiefel; Clarence Knickman; Davis Phinney; Andrew Weaver	Team time trial	2:02:57	3rd place, bronze medalist(s)

Women

Athlete	Event	Time	Rank
Connie Carpenter	Road race	2:11:14	1st place, gold medalist(s)
Janelle Parks	Road race	2:13:28	10
Inga Thompson	Road race	2:13:28	21
Rebecca Twigg	Road race	2:11:14	2nd place, silver medalist(s)

=== Track ===
Points race

Athlete	Event	Round 1		Final	
Athlete	Event	Points	Rank	Points	Rank
Danny Van Haute	Points race	2	=15	Did not advance	
Mark Whitehead	Points race	9	14	Did not advance	

Pursuit

Athlete	Event	Qualifying		Round 1	Quarterfinal	Semifinal	Final / BM	
Athlete	Event	Time	Rank	Opposition Result	Opposition Result	Opposition Result	Opposition Result	Rank
Steve Hegg	Individual	4:35.57	1 Q	Curuchet (ARG); W 4:40.26	Grenda (AUS); W 4:37.10	Woods (AUS); W 4:47.07	Gölz (FRG); W 4:39.35	1st place, gold medalist(s)
Leonard Nitz	Individual	4:46.99	3 Q	García (URU); W 4:47.97	Pedersen (DEN); W 4:43.98	Gölz (FRG); L OVT	Bronze medal race Woods (AUS); W 4:44.03	3rd place, bronze medalist(s)
Brent Emery; David Grylls; Steve Hegg; Patrick McDonough; Leonard Nitz	Team	4:29.92	5 Q	—N/a	Denmark; W 4:25.15	West Germany; W	Australia; L 4:29.85	2nd place, silver medalist(s)

Sprint

Athlete	Event	Round 1	Repechage 1	Repechage 2	Round 2	Repechage 3	Round of 16	Repechage 4	Repechage 5	Quarterfinal	Semifinal	Final / BM	
Athlete	Event	Opposition Result	Opposition Result	Opposition Result	Opposition Result	Opposition Result	Opposition Result	Opposition Result	Opposition Result	Opposition Result	Opposition Result	Opposition Result	Rank
Mark Gorski	Sprint	Richardson (ANT); W 10.87	Bye		Jamur (BRA); W 10.79	Bye	Iannone (ARG), Ongaro (CAN); W 10.89	Bye		Scheller (FRG); W 11.65, W 11.08	Sakamoto (JPN); W 11.17, W 10.74	Vails (USA); W 10.49, W 10.95	1st place, gold medalist(s)
Nelson Vails	Sprint	Urquijo (CHI), Tucker (AUS); W 11.07	Bye		Samuel (TRI); W 10.80	Bye	Barry (GBR); W 11.05	Bye		Alexandre (ARG); W 11.33, W 12.07	Vernet (FRA); W 10.93, W 10.86	Gorski (USA); L, L	2nd place, silver medalist(s)

Time trial

Athlete	Event	Time	Rank
Rory O'Reilly	1 km time trial	1:07.39	8

== Diving ==
Men

Athlete	Event	Preliminary		Final	
Athlete	Event	Points	Rank	Points	Rank
Greg Louganis	3 m springboard	752.37	1 Q	754.41	1st place, gold medalist(s)
Ronald Merriott	3 m springboard	628.47	2 Q	661.32	3rd place, bronze medalist(s)
Bruce Kimball	10 m platform	602.64	4 Q	643.50	2nd place, silver medalist(s)
Greg Louganis	10 m platform	688.05	1 Q	710.91	1st place, gold medalist(s)

Women

Athlete	Event	Preliminary		Final	
Athlete	Event	Points	Rank	Points	Rank
Kelly McCormick	3 m springboard	516.75	2 Q	527.46	2nd place, silver medalist(s)
Christina Seufert	3 m springboard	481.41	5 Q	517.62	3rd place, bronze medalist(s)
Michele Mitchell	10 m platform	402.39	3 Q	431.19	2nd place, silver medalist(s)
Wendy Wyland	10 m platform	376.11	5 Q	422.07	3rd place, bronze medalist(s)

== Equestrian ==
Dressage

Athlete	Horse	Event	Qualifying		Final	
Athlete	Horse	Event	Points	Rank	Points	Rank
Robert Dover	Romantico	Individual	1513	17	Did not advance	
Hilda Gurney	Keen	Individual	1530	14	Did not advance	
Sandy Pflueger-Clark	Marco Polo	Individual	1516	16	Did not advance	
Robert Dover; Hilda Gurney; Sandy Pflueger-Clark	as above	Team	4559	6	—N/a	

Eventing

Athlete	Horse	Event	Dressage		Cross-country		Jumping		Total	
Athlete	Horse	Event	Faults	Rank	Faults	Rank	Faults	Rank	Faults	Rank
Bruce Davidson	JJ Babu	Individual	49.00	2	21.20	17	5.00	=23	75.20	13
Torrance Fleischmann	Finvarra	Individual	57.60	=10	2.80	7	0.00	=1	60.40	4
Michael Plumb	Blue Stone	Individual	61.20	16	5.20	8	5.00	=23	71.40	10
Karen Stives	Ben Arthur	Individual	49.20	3	0.00	=1	5.00	=23	54.20	2nd place, silver medalist(s)
Bruce Davidson; Torrance Fleischmann; Michael Plumb; Karen Stives	as above	Team	155.80	1	8.00	2	10.00	6	186.00	1st place, gold medalist(s)

Jumping

Athlete	Horse	Event	Round 1		Round 2		Total		Jump-off	
Athlete	Horse	Event	Faults	Rank	Faults	Rank	Faults	Rank	Faults	Rank
Joseph Fargis	Touch of Class	Individual	0.00	=1 Q	4.00	=2	4.00	=1	0.00	1st place, gold medalist(s)
Conrad Homfeld	Abdullah	Individual	4.00	=3 Q	0.00	1	4.00	=1	8.00	2nd place, silver medalist(s)
Melanie Smith	Calypso	Individual	4.00	=3 Q	8.00	=10	12.00	=7	Did not advance	
Leslie Burr Howard; Joseph Fargis; Conrad Homfeld; Melanie Smith	Albany; Touch of Class; Abdullah; Calypso	Team	4.00	1 Q	8.00	1	12.00	1st place, gold medalist(s)	—N/a	

== Fencing ==
Twenty fencers represented the United States in 1984.

Men

Athlete	Event	Round 1 pool		Quarterfinal pool		Semifinal pool		Elimination round							
Athlete	Event	Round 1 pool		Quarterfinal pool		Semifinal pool		Round 1	Round 2	Barrage 1	Barrage 2	Quarterfinal	Semifinal / Cl.	Final / BM / Pl.	
Athlete	Event	W–T–L	Rank	W–L	Rank	W–L	Rank	Opposition Result	Opposition Result	Opposition Result	Opposition Result	Opposition Result	Opposition Result	Opposition Result	Rank
Peter Lewison	Individual foil	3–0–2	3 Q	3–1	2 Q	2–3	4 Q	Gey (FRG); L 7–10	Did not advance	Hatuel (ISR); W 10–8	Borella (ITA); L 4–10	Did not advance			11
Greg Massialas	Individual foil	4–0–1	2 Q	1–3	4	Did not advance									28
Mike McCahey	Individual foil	3–0–2	3 Q	1–3	4	Did not advance									30
Peter Lewison; Greg Massialas; Mike Marx; Mike McCahey; Mark Smith	Team foil	1–0–1	2 Q	—N/a								West Germany; L 2–9	Did not advance	5th place final Great Britain; W 9–6	5
Robert Marx	Individual épée	4–0–1	2 Q	3–2	2 Q	1–4	5	Did not advance							18
Lee Shelley	Individual épée	2–0–2	4 Q	1–4	4	Did not advance									38
Stephen Trevor	Individual épée	3–0–1	1 Q	4–1	2 Q	2–3	5	Did not advance							17
Robert Marx; John Moreau; Peter Schifrin; Lee Shelley; Stephen Trevor	Team épée	1–1–1	3	—N/a								Did not advance			10
Michael Lofton	Individual sabre	3–0–2	2 Q	2–2	4 Q	2–3	5	Did not advance							17
Steve Mormando	Individual sabre	1–0–3	5 Q	2–2	4 Q	3–2	2 Q	Scholz (FRG); W 10–4	Granger-Veryon (FRA); L 9–10	Bye	Guichot (FRA); L 8–10	Did not advance			12
Peter Westbrook	Individual sabre	3–0–2	3 Q	2–2	3 Q	3–2	3 Q	Babanasis (GRE); W 10–3	Dalla Barba (ITA); W 11–9	Bye		Guichot (FRA); W 10–8	Lamour (FRA); L 4–10	Bronze medal final Granger-Veryon (FRA); W 10–5	3rd place, bronze medalist(s)
Joel Glucksman; Michael Lofton; Steve Mormando; Phillip Reilly; Peter Westbrook	Team sabre	1–0–2	3 Q	—N/a								Romania; L 3–9	Did not advance	5th place final China; L 7–9	6

Women

Athlete	Event	Round 1 pool		Quarterfinal pool		Semifinal pool		Elimination round							
Athlete	Event	Round 1 pool		Quarterfinal pool		Semifinal pool		Round 1	Round 2	Barrage 1	Barrage 2	Quarterfinal	Semifinal / Cl.	Final / BM / Pl.	
Athlete	Event	W–L	Rank	W–L	Rank	W–L	Rank	Opposition Result	Opposition Result	Opposition Result	Opposition Result	Opposition Result	Opposition Result	Opposition Result	Rank
Jana Angelakis	Individual foil	3–3	4 Q	0–4	5	Did not advance									28
Vincent Bradford	Individual foil	2–4	5	Did not advance											23
Debra Waples	Individual foil	3–3	4 Q	1–3	4 Q	1–4	6	Did not advance							20
Jana Angelakis; Susan Badders; Vincent Bradford; Sharon Monplaisir; Debra Waples	Team foil	1–1	2 Q	—N/a								Romania; L 4–8	Did not advance	5th place final China; L 5–9	6

== Field hockey ==
Summary

Team	Event	Preliminary round						Semifinal / Cl.	Final / BM / Pl.	
Team	Event	Opposition Result	Opposition Result	Opposition Result	Opposition Result	Opposition Result	Rank	Opposition Result	Opposition Result	Rank
United States men	Men's tournament	India; L 1–5	West Germany; L 0–4	Malaysia; L 1–14	Spain; L 1–3	Australia; L 1–2	6	9th-12th semifinal Kenya; L 0–0 (5–6)	11th place final Malaysia; L 3–3 (8–9)	12
United States women	Women's tournament	Canada; W 4–1	Netherlands; L 1–2	New Zealand; W 2–0	Australia; T 1–1	West Germany; T 1–1	3rd place, bronze medalist(s)	—N/a		

=== Men's tournament ===
Roster

- Manager: Dewey Lee Yoder
1. Mohammed Barakat
2. Ken Barrett
3. Rawle Cox
4. Trevor Fernandes
5. Robert Gregg
6. Iqbal Manzar (c)
7. Michael Kraus
8. Randy Lipscher (GK)
9. David McMichael
10. Gary Newton
11. Michael Newton
12. Brian Spencer
13. Morgan Stebbins
14. Robert Stiles (GK)
15. Andrew Stone
16. Nigel Traverso

Preliminary round

Pos	Team	Pld	W	D	L	GF	GA	GD	Pts	Qualification
1	Australia	5	5	0	0	17	4	+13	10	Semi-finals
2	West Germany	5	3	1	1	12	4	+8	7	Semi-finals
3	India	5	3	1	1	14	9	+5	7	5–8th place semi-finals
4	Spain	5	2	0	3	11	12	−1	4	5–8th place semi-finals
5	Malaysia	5	1	0	4	6	17	−11	2	9–12th place semi-finals
6	United States (H)	5	0	0	5	4	18	−14	0	9–12th place semi-finals

Source: FIH
(H) Hosts

29 July 1984
17:15

India	5–1	United States
Kumar 10'; Fernandis 28', 61'; Carvalho 47'; Mohamed 63'	Report	Stone 35+'

Umpires:
Horacio Servetto (ARG)
Rob Lathouwers (NED)

31 July 1984
10:15

West Germany	4–0	United States
Dopp 2', 70+'; Blöcher 24'; Slawyk 33'	Report

Umpires:
K O'Connor (CAN)
J Perera (SRI)

2 August 1984
10:15

Malaysia	4–1	United States
Tam Cheo Sing 16', 18'; SSK. Singh 61'; Chew 68'	Report	Spencer 29'

Umpires:
Alain Renaud (FRA)
J Perera (SRI)

4 August 1984
14:30

Spain	3–1	United States
Roca 21', 39', 43'	Report	G. Newton 12'

Umpires:
Rob Lathouwers (NED)
Shams-uz Zamman (PAK)

6 August 1984
08:30

Australia	2–1	United States
Patmore 15', 58'	Report	Stone 67'

Umpires:
Ian Faulkner (NZL)
Shams-uz Zamman (PAK)

9th-12th place classification

8 August 1984
21:00

United States	1–1 (a.e.t.)	Kenya
G. Newton 99'	Report	Saini 87'
Penalties
G. Newton (penalty shoot-out scored); Manzar (penalty shoot-out scored)	2–4	(penalty shoot-out scored) Sehmi; (penalty shoot-out scored) Saini; (penalty shoot-out scored) Daved; (penalty shoot-out scored) Panesar

Umpires:
K O'Connor (CAN)
Ian Faulkner (NZL)

11th place match

10 August 1984
08:00

Malaysia	3–3 (a.e.t.)	United States
Ow Soon Kooi 19', 67'; Murugasen 80'	Report	Spencer 41', 49'; G. Newton 97'
Penalties
Santa Maria (penalty shoot-out scored); Van Huizen (penalty shoot-out scored); SK. Singh (penalty shoot-out scored); SSK. Singh (penalty shoot-out scored); Chew (penalty shoot-out scored); Santa Maria (penalty shoot-out missed); Van Huizen (penalty shoot-out scored); SK. Singh (penalty shoot-out scored); SSK. Singh (penalty shoot-out scored); Chew (penalty shoot-out scored)	9–8	(penalty shoot-out scored) Stone; (penalty shoot-out scored) M. Newton; (penalty shoot-out scored) G. Newton; (penalty shoot-out scored) Spencer; (penalty shoot-out missed) Iqbal; (penalty shoot-out missed) Stone; (penalty shoot-out scored) M. Newton; (penalty shoot-out scored) G. Newton; (penalty shoot-out scored) Spencer; (penalty shoot-out scored) Iqbal

Umpires:
I Almohandis (EGY)
K O'Connor (CAN)

=== Women's tournament ===
Roster
The following players represented the United States:

- Gwen Cheeseman
- Beth Anders
- Kathleen McGahey
- Anita Miller
- Regina Buggy
- Christine Larson-Mason
- Beth Beglin
- Marcella Place
- Julie Staver
- Diane Moyer
- Sheryl Johnson
- Charlene Morett
- Karen Shelton
- Brenda Stauffer
- Leslie Milne
- Judy Strong

Round robin

Pos	Team	Pld	W	D	L	GF	GA	GD	Pts
1st place, gold medalist(s)	Netherlands	5	4	1	0	14	6	+8	9
2nd place, silver medalist(s)	West Germany	5	2	2	1	9	9	0	6
3rd place, bronze medalist(s)	United States (H)	5	2	1	2	9	7	+2	5
4	Australia	5	2	1	2	9	7	+2	5
5	Canada	5	2	1	2	9	11	−2	5
6	New Zealand	5	0	0	5	2	12	−10	0

Source: FIH
(H) Hosts

1 August 1984
17:15

United States	4–1	Canada
Anders 7', 18', 64'; Beglin 49'	Report	Stoyka 55'

Umpires:
Bärbel Aichinger (FRG)
Loekie Roeg-Rogge (NED)

3 August 1984
08:00

Netherlands	2–1	United States
Boekhorst 7'; Van Doorn 65'	Report	Anders 55'

Umpires:
Ruth Tong-Trachsler (SUI)
Robyn Davis (AUS)

4 August 1984
16:15

New Zealand	0–2	United States
	Report	Anders 23', 42'

Umpires:
Margaret Lanning (CAN)
Jan Adams (AUS)

7 August 1984
13:45

Australia	3–1	United States
Heberle 5', 53'; Sunderland 16'	Report	Anders 14'

Umpires:
Loekie Roeg-Rogge (NED)
Brigitte de Vries-Scheeren (NED)

9 August 1984
13:15

United States	1–1	West Germany
Anders 12'	Report	Hahn 57'

Umpires:
F. Westerbring (SUI)
Jan Adams (AUS)

Play-off

- As Australia and the United States finished on equal points, a shoot-out was contested to determine third place.

10 August 1984
19:00

Australia	shoot-out	United States
	Report
Penalties
Leggatt (penalty shoot-out missed); Pisani (penalty shoot-out missed); Pearce (penalty shoot-out scored); Buchanan-Patmore (penalty shoot-out scored); Gray (penalty shoot-out missed); Leggatt (penalty shoot-out missed); Pisani (penalty shoot-out scored); Pearce (penalty shoot-out missed); Buchanan-Patmore (penalty shoot-out scored); Gray (penalty shoot-out scored)	5–10	(penalty shoot-out scored) Johnson; (penalty shoot-out scored) Anders; (penalty shoot-out scored) Strong; (penalty shoot-out scored) Larson-Mason; (penalty shoot-out scored) Staver; (penalty shoot-out scored) Johnson; (penalty shoot-out scored) Anders; (penalty shoot-out scored) Strong; (penalty shoot-out scored) Larson-Mason; (penalty shoot-out scored) Staver

Umpires:
Brigitte de Vries-Scheeren (NED)
Loekie Roeg-Rogge (NED)

== Football ==
Summary

Team	Event	Group stage				Quarterfinal	Semifinal	Final / BM	
Team	Event	Opposition Result	Opposition Result	Opposition Result	Rank	Opposition Result	Opposition Result	Opposition Result	Rank
United States men	Men's tournament	Costa Rica; W 3–0	Italy; L 0–1	Egypt; T 1–1	3	Did not advance			9

Roster
Head coach: (Greece) Alketas Panagoulias

No.	Pos.	Player	DoB	Age	Caps	Club	Tournament games	Tournament goals	Minutes played	Sub off	Sub on	Cards yellow/red
1	GK	David Brcic	Jun 21, 1957	27	?	(United States) New York Cosmos	3	0	270	0	0	0
2	DF	Bruce Savage	Dec 21, 1960	23	?	(United States) Baltimore Blast	3	0	270	0	0	0
3	FW	Gregg Thompson	May 29, 1961	23	?	(United States) Tampa Bay Rowdies	3	1	270	0	0	0
4	DF	Jeff Durgan	Aug 29, 1961	22	?	(United States) New York Cosmos	1	0	36	1	0	0
5	MF	Kazbek Tambi	Dec 8, 1961	22	?	(United States) New York Cosmos	0	0	0	0	0	0
6	MF	Angelo DiBernardo	May 16, 1956	26	?	(United States) New York Cosmos	3	0	256	1	0	0
7	DF	Erhardt Kapp	Jun 16, 1959	25	?	(United States) Pittsburgh Spirit	3	0	270	0	0	(yellow card) 1
8	MF	Hernan "Chico" Borja	Aug 24, 1959	24	?	(United States) New York Cosmos	3	0	218	2	0	(yellow card) 1
9	FW	Steve Moyers	Sep 23, 1956	27	?	(United States) New York Cosmos	3	0	270	0	0	0
10	MF	Rick Davis	Nov 24, 1958	25	?	(United States) St. Louis Steamers	3	2	270	0	0	0
11	MF	Hugo Perez	Nov 8, 1963	20	?	(United States) San Diego Sockers	3	0	199	1	1	0
12	DF	Kevin Crow	Sep 17, 1961	22	?	(United States) San Diego Sockers	3	0	270	0	0	0
13	FW	Jean Willrich	Apr 27, 1953	31	?	(United States) San Diego Sockers	2	1	157	1	0	0
14	MF	Mike Fox	Sep 24, 1961	22	?	(United States) Las Vegas Americans	3	0	148	0	2	0
15	GK	Jamie Swanner	Jan 13, 1961	23	?	(United States) Clemson University	0	0	0	0	0	0
16	FW	Jeff Hooker	Mar 21, 1965	19	?	(United States) University of California, Los Angeles	3	0	72	0	3	0
17	FW	Amr Aly	Aug 1, 1962	21	?	(United States) Columbia University	0	0	0	0	0	0

Group stage

Pos	Team	Pld	W	D	L	GF	GA	GD	Pts	Qualification
1	Italy	3	2	0	1	2	1	+1	4	Qualified for quarter-finals
2	Egypt	3	1	1	1	5	3	+2	3	Qualified for quarter-finals
3	United States	3	1	1	1	4	2	+2	3	
4	Costa Rica	3	1	0	2	2	7	−5	2	

Source: FIFA
July 29, 1984
19:30

United States	3–0	Costa Rica
Davis 23', 86'; Willrich 35'	Report

Stanford Stadium, Stanford
Attendance: 78.000
Referee: Quiniou (FRA)

July 31, 1984
19:00

Italy	1–0	United States
Fanna 58'	Report

Rose Bowl, Pasadena
Attendance: 63.624
Referee: Al-Salmi (KUW)

August 2, 1984
19:00

Egypt	1–1	United States
Soliman 27'	Report	Thompson 8'

Stanford Stadium, Stanford
Attendance: 54.973
Referee: Romero (ARG)

== Gymnastics ==
=== Artistic ===
Men
Team

Athlete	Event	Apparatus												Total	
Athlete	Event	F		PH		R		V		PB		HB		Total	
Athlete	Event	C	O	C	O	C	O	C	O	C	O	C	O	Score	Rank
Bart Conner	Team	9.95	9.90 Q	9.80	9.75	9.70	9.85	9.80	9.85	9.90	10.00 Q	9.90	9.90	118.30	4 Q
Timothy Daggett	Team	9.75	9.50	9.95	9.90 Q	9.75	9.90	9.70	9.80	9.80	9.90	9.90	10.00 Q	117.85	8
Mitchell Gaylord	Team	9.70	9.75	9.90	9.85	9.85	10.00 Q	9.95	9.90 Q	10.00	9.90 Q	9.40	9.95	118.15	=6 Q
James Hartung	Team	9.80	9.80	9.80	9.70	9.80	9.80	9.90	9.90 Q	9.75	9.90	9.80	9.80	117.75	9
Scott Johnson	Team	9.80	9.70	9.70	9.65	9.65	9.85	9.85	9.85	9.60	9.80	9.65	9.50	116.60	=16
Peter Vidmar	Team	9.80	9.80 q	10.00	9.90 Q	9.80	9.90 Q	9.80	9.85	9.90	9.90	9.95	9.95 Q	118.55	1 Q
Total	Team	98.05		98.55		98.40		98.65		98.95		98.80		591.40	1st place, gold medalist(s)

Individual finals

Athlete	Event	Apparatus												Total	
Athlete	Event	F		PH		R		V		PB		HB		Total	
Athlete	Event	P	F	P	F	P	F	P	F	P	F	P	F	Score	Rank
Bart Conner	All-around	9.925	9.850	9.775	9.900	9.775	9.850	9.825	9.900	9.950	9.800	9.900	9.900	118.350	6
Mitchell Gaylord	All-around	9.725	9.850	9.875	9.950	9.925	9.900	9.925	9.900	9.950	9.900	9.675	9.950	118.525	5
Peter Vidmar	All-around	9.800	9.800	9.950	10.000	9.850	9.900	9.825	9.900	9.900	9.900	9.950	9.900	118.675	2nd place, silver medalist(s)
Bart Conner	Floor	9.925	9.750	—N/a										19.675	5
Peter Vidmar	Floor	9.800	9.750	—N/a										19.550	7
Timothy Daggett	Pommel horse	—N/a		9.925	9.900	—N/a								19.825	3rd place, bronze medalist(s)
Peter Vidmar	Pommel horse	—N/a		9.950	10.000	—N/a								19.950	1st place, gold medalist(s)
Mitchell Gaylord	Rings	—N/a				9.925	9.900	—N/a						19.825	3rd place, bronze medalist(s)
Peter Vidmar	Rings	—N/a				9.850	9.900	—N/a						19.750	=4
Mitchell Gaylord	Vault	—N/a						9.925	9.900	—N/a				19.825	2nd place, silver medalist(s)
James Hartung	Vault	—N/a						9.900	9.900	—N/a				19.800	6
Bart Conner	Parallel bars	—N/a								9.950	10.000	—N/a		19.950	1st place, gold medalist(s)
Mitchell Gaylord	Parallel bars	—N/a								9.950	9.900	—N/a		19.850	3rd place, bronze medalist(s)
Timothy Daggett	Horizontal bar	—N/a										9.950	9.900	19.850	=4
Peter Vidmar	Horizontal bar	—N/a										9.950	9.900	19.850	=4

Women
Team

Athlete	Event	Apparatus								Total	
Athlete	Event	V		UB		BB		F		Total	
Athlete	Event	C	O	C	O	C	O	C	O	Score	Rank
Pamela Bileck	Team	9.80	9.60	9.00	9.60	9.70	9.60	9.70	9.80	76.80	17
Michelle Dusserre	Team	9.80	9.70	9.85	9.80	9.40	9.40	9.70	9.90	77.55	12
Kathy Johnson	Team	9.85	9.80	9.60	9.80	9.85	9.75 Q	9.80	9.65	78.10	6 Q
Julianne McNamara	Team	9.80	9.75	9.90	10.00 Q	9.85	9.20	9.90	10.00 Q	78.40	=3 Q
Mary Lou Retton	Team	9.90	10.00 Q	9.80	9.90 Q	9.85	9.75 Q	9.95	9.90 Q	79.05	1 Q
Tracee Talavera	Team	9.80	9.90 Q	9.45	9.75	9.65	9.15	9.60	9.80	77.10	16
Total	Team	98.30		97.85		96.60		98.45		391.20	2nd place, silver medalist(s)

Individual finals

Athlete	Event	Apparatus								Total	
Athlete	Event	V		UB		BB		F		Total	
Athlete	Event	P	F	P	F	P	F	P	F	Score	Rank
Kathy Johnson	All-around	9.825	9.850	9.700	9.900	9.800	9.400	9.725	9.250	77.450	10
Julianne McNamara	All-around	9.775	9.950	9.950	10.000	9.525	9.550	9.950	9.700	78.400	4
Mary Lou Retton	All-around	9.950	10.000	9.850	9.850	9.800	9.800	9.925	10.000	79.175	1st place, gold medalist(s)
Mary Lou Retton	Vault	9.950	9.900	—N/a						19.850	2nd place, silver medalist(s)
Tracee Talavera	Vault	9.850	9.850	—N/a						19.700	4
Julianne McNamara	Uneven bars	—N/a		9.950	10.000	—N/a				19.950	1st place, gold medalist(s)
Mary Lou Retton	Uneven bars	—N/a		9.850	9.950	—N/a				19.800	3rd place, bronze medalist(s)
Kathy Johnson	Balance beam	—N/a				9.800	9.850	—N/a		19.650	3rd place, bronze medalist(s)
Mary Lou Retton	Balance beam	—N/a				9.800	9.750	—N/a		19.550	4
Julianne McNamara	Floor	—N/a						9.950	10.000	19.950	2nd place, silver medalist(s)
Mary Lou Retton	Floor	—N/a						9.925	9.850	19.775	3rd place, bronze medalist(s)

=== Rhythmic ===
Athlete	Event	Qualification						Final					Total			
Athlete	Event	Hoop	Ball	Clubs	Ribbon	Total	Rank	Hoop	Ball	Clubs	Ribbon	Total	P	F	Total	Rank
Michelle Berube	All-around	9.00	9.10	8.85	9.25	36.20	=17 Q	9.35	9.55	9.40	9.40	37.70	18.10	37.70	55.80	14
Valerie Zimring	All-around	8.85	9.25	9.50	9.30	36.90	12 Q	9.55	9.45	9.50	9.30	37.80	18.45	37.80	56.25	11

== Handball ==
Summary

team	Event	Preliminary round						Final / BM / Pl.	
team	Event	Opposition Result	Opposition Result	Opposition Result	Opposition Result	Opposition Result	Rank	Opposition Result	Rank
United States men	Men's tournament	West Germany; L 19–21	Denmark; L 16–19	Sweden; L 18–21	Spain; L 16–17	South Korea; T 22–22	5	9th place game Japan; W 24–16	9
United States women	Women's tournament	Yugoslavia; L 20–33	South Korea; L 27–29	China; W 25–22	West Germany; L 17–18	Austria; W 25–21	5	—N/a	

=== Men's tournament ===
Roster
- James Buehning
- Bob Djokovich
- Tim Dykstra
- Craig Gilbert
- Steven Goss
- William Kessler
- Stephen Kirk
- Peter Lash
- Michael Lenard
- Joseph McVein
- Gregory Morava
- Rod Oshita
- Thomas Schneeberger
- Joe Story

- Head coach: Javier Garcia

Preliminary Round

Group B

- Lost to West Germany (19:21)
- Lost to Denmark (16:19)
- Lost to Sweden (18:21)
- Lost to Spain (16:17)
- Drew with South Korea (22:22)

9th place final
- Defeated Japan (24:16)

=== Women's tournament ===
Roster
- Pamela Boyd
- Reita Clanton
- Theresa Contos
- Sandra de la Riva
- Mary Dwight
- Carmen Forest
- Melinda Hale
- Leora Jones
- Carol Lindsey
- Cynthia Stinger
- Penelope Stone
- Janice Trombly
- Sherry Winn

- Head coach: Klement Capilar

== Judo ==
Athlete	Event	Round of 32	Round of 16	Quarterfinal	Semifinal	Repechage 1	Repechage 2	Final / BM	
Athlete	Event	Opposition Result	Opposition Result	Opposition Result	Opposition Result	Opposition Result	Opposition Result	Opposition Result	Rank
Edward Liddie	–60 kg	Bye	Chau (TPE); W 1000–0000	Jupke (FRG); W 0010–0000	Kim (KOR); L 0000–0010	—N/a	Bye	Bronze medal final Delvingt (FRA); W 0010–0000	3rd place, bronze medalist(s)
Craig Agena	–65 kg	Chinchilla (NOR); L 0000–0010	Did not advance						=20
Mike Swain	–71 kg	Evensen (NOR); W 0000–0000 Y	Al-Hammad (KUW); W 1000–0000	Onmura (BRA); L 0000–0000 Y	Did not advance				=11
Brett Barron	–78 kg	Al-Tubaikh (KUW); L 0000–1000	Did not advance			Henneveld (NED); L 0000–0001	Did not advance		=9
Robert Berland	–86 kg	Bye	Büchel (LIE); W 1000–0000	White (GBR); W 0000–0000 Y	Carmona (BRA); W 0010–0000	Bye		Seisenbacher (AUT); L 0000–1000	2nd place, silver medalist(s)
Leo White	–95 kg	Van de Walle (BEL); W 0100–0000	Al-Ghareeb (KUW); W 1000–0000	Friðriksson (ISL); L 0000–0100	Did not advance				=11
Doug Nelson	+95 kg	—N/a	Andersen (ARG); W 0200–0000	von der Groeben (FRG); W 0010–0000	Parisi (FRA); L 0000–0010	—N/a	Bye	Bronze medal final Cho (KOR); L 0000–0010	=5
Dewey Mitchell	Open	—N/a	Blaney (CAN); L 0000–0000 Y	Did not advance		—N/a	Did not advance		=11

== Modern pentathlon ==
Three male modern pentathletes represented the United States in 1984. They won the silver medal in the team event.

Athlete	Event	Riding (cross-country)				Fencing (épée one touch)			Swimming (300 m freestyle)			Shooting (25 m rapid fire pistol)			Running (4000 m cross-country)			Total	
Athlete	Event	Time	Penalties	Rank	MP points	RR	Rank	MP points	Time	Rank	MP points	Score	Rank	MP points	Time	Rank	MP points	MP points	Rank
Dean Glenesk	Individual	1:49.54	14	6	1086	28 V – 23 D	=19	824	3:22.900	12	1252	183	45	758	13:20.13	13	1165	5085	18
Greg Losey	Individual	1:46.91	38	15	1062	32 V – 19 D	=5	912	3:34.277	29	1160	192	=15	956	13:52.24	24	1068	5158	13
Michael Storm	Individual	1:42.68	60	23	1040	30 V – 21 D	=12	868	3:18.408	9	1288	198	1	1088	14:01.18	30	1041	5325	5
Dean Glenesk; Greg Losey; Michael Storm	Team	—N/a		2	3188	—N/a	3	2604	—N/a	6	3700	—N/a	7	2802	—N/a	8	3724	15568	2nd place, silver medalist(s)

== Rowing ==
United States rowing results and competitors:

Men

Athlete	Event	Heat		Repechage		Semifinal		Final	
Athlete	Event	Time	Rank	Time	Rank	Time	Rank	Time	Rank
John Biglow	Single sculls	7:31.30	3 R	7:21.47	1 SF	7:24.98	3 FA	7:12.00	4
Dave De Ruff; John Strotbeck Jr.	Coxless pair	7:00.34	3 SF	Bye		6:59.10	3 FA	6:58.46	6
Robert Espeseth; Doug Herland; Kevin Still	Coxed pair	7:17.80	2 R	7:22.88	1 FA	—N/a		7:12.81	3rd place, bronze medalist(s)
Paul Enquist; Bradley Lewis	Double sculls	6:38.21	2 R	6:38.32	1 FA	—N/a		6:36.87	1st place, gold medalist(s)
David Clark; Alan Forney; Jon Smith; Otto Stekl	Coxless four	6:11.58	1 FA	Bye		—N/a		6:06.10	2nd place, silver medalist(s)
Michael Bach; Edward Ives; Tom Kiefer; Gregory Springer; John Stillings	Coxed four	6:21.94	2 R	6:27.55	2 FA	—N/a		6:20.28	2nd place, silver medalist(s)
Bruce Beall; Curtis Fleming; Ridgely Johnson; Greg Montesi	Quadruple sculls	6:13.51	4 R	6:14.32	4 FB	—N/a		6:11.50	7
Fred Borchelt; Charles Clapp; Tom Darling; Bruce Ibbetson; Bob Jaugstetter; Chip Lubsen; Chris Penny; Andrew Sudduth; John Terwilliger	Eight	5:51.95	1 FA	Bye		—N/a		5:41.74	2nd place, silver medalist(s)

Women

Athlete	Event	Heat		Repechage		Semifinal		Final	
Athlete	Event	Time	Rank	Time	Rank	Time	Rank	Time	Rank
Carlie Geer	Single sculls	3:45.05	1 SF	Bye		3:57.93	2 FA	3:43.89	2nd place, silver medalist(s)
Barbara Kirch; Chari Towne	Pair	—N/a						3:44.35	5
Judy Geer; Cathy Thaxton-Tippett	Double sculls	3:30.91	3 R	—N/a	4^{[c]} FA	—N/a		3:32.33	6
Jan Harville; Valerie McClain-Ward; Liz Miles; Abby Peck; Patricia Spratlen	Four	3:28.02	3 R	3:23.70	1 FA	—N/a		3:23.58	4
Ginny Gilder; Joan Lind; Anne Marden; Kelly Rickon; Lisa Rohde	Quadruple sculls	3:14.68	1 FA	Bye		—N/a		3:15.57	2nd place, silver medalist(s)
Betsy Beard; Carol Bower; Jeanne Flanagan; Carie Graves; Kathy Keeler; Holly Metcalf; Kristine Norelius; Shyril O'Steen; Kristen Thorsness	Eight	—N/a						2:59.80	1st place, gold medalist(s)

^{c} - Race not run, times from heats were used to rank boats.
Qualification legend: FA = Final A (medal); FB = Final B (non-medal); SF = Semifinal; R = Repechage

== Sailing ==
Athlete	Event	Race							Total	
Athlete	Event	1	2	3	4	5	6	7	Points	Rank
Scott Steele	Windglider	13.0	0.0	3.0	0.0	15.0	15.0	~~20.0~~	46.0	2nd place, silver medalist(s)
John Bertrand	Finn	~~DSQ~~	10.0	0.0	0.0	3.0	10.0	14.0	37.0	2nd place, silver medalist(s)
Steve Benjamin; Chris Steinfeld	470	16.0	3.0	0.0	8.0	~~PMS~~	13.0	3.0	43.0	2nd place, silver medalist(s)
William Carl Buchan; Jonathan McKee	Flying Dutchman	3.0	0.0	3.0	5.7	0.0	8.0	~~11.7~~	19.7	1st place, gold medalist(s)
Jay Glaser; Randy Smyth	Tornado	0.0	~~DNF~~	13.0	0.0	8.0	0.0	16.0	37.0	2nd place, silver medalist(s)
William Earl Buchan; Steven Erickson	Star	0.0	15.0	~~RET~~	3.0	11.7	0.0	0.0	29.7	1st place, gold medalist(s)
Rod Davis; Robbie Haines; Edward Trevelyan	Soling	0.0	15.0	5.7	10.0	0.0	3.0	~~DNS~~	33.7	1st place, gold medalist(s)

== Shooting ==
Men

Athlete	Event	Score	Rank
Allyn Johnson	25 m rapid fire pistol	586	=20
John McNally	25 m rapid fire pistol	581	=26
Erich Buljung	50 m pistol	558	9
Don Nygord	50 m pistol	554	=14
Todd Bensley	50 m running target	572	13
Randy Stewart	50 m running target	575	9
Glenn Dubis	10 m air rifle	579	=15
John Rost	10 m air rifle	583	6
Donald Durbin	50 m rifle prone	592	=13
Edward Etzel	50 m rifle prone	599	1st place, gold medalist(s)
Glenn Dubis	50 m rifle three positions	1151	6
Edward Etzel	50 m rifle three positions	1142	=15

Women

Athlete	Event	Score	Rank	Shoot-off	
Athlete	Event	Score	Rank	Score	Rank
Kim Dyer	25 m pistol	574	13	—N/a	
Ruby Fox	25 m pistol	585	2nd place, silver medalist(s)	—N/a	
Mary Anne Schweitzer	10 m air rifle	379	18	—N/a	
Pat Spurgin	10 m air rifle	393 OR	1st place, gold medalist(s)	—N/a	
Wanda Jewell	50 m rifle three positions	578	=2	39	3rd place, bronze medalist(s)
Gloria Parmentier	50 m rifle three positions	576	4	—N/a	

Open

Athlete	Event	Score	Rank	Shoot-off	
Athlete	Event	Score	Rank	Score	Rank
Daniel Carlisle	Trap	192	=1	22	3rd place, bronze medalist(s)
Walter Zobell	Trap	181	=22	—N/a	
Matthew Dryke	Skeet	198	1st place, gold medalist(s)	—N/a	
Michael Thompson	Skeet	185	=38	—N/a	

== Swimming ==
Men

Athlete	Event	Heat		Final	
Athlete	Event	Time	Rank	Time	Rank
Rowdy Gaines	100 m freestyle	50.41	3 FA	49.80 OR	1st place, gold medalist(s)
Mike Heath	100 m freestyle	50.39	2 FA	50.41	4
Jeff Float	200 m freestyle	1:50.95	5 FA	1:50.18	4
Mike Heath	200 m freestyle	1:49.87	2 FA	1:49.10	2nd place, silver medalist(s)
George DiCarlo	400 m freestyle	3:53.44	3 FA	3:51.23 OR	1st place, gold medalist(s)
John Mykkanen	400 m freestyle	3:53.43	2 FA	3:51.49	2nd place, silver medalist(s)
George DiCarlo	1500 m freestyle	15:22.88	4 FA	15:10.59	2nd place, silver medalist(s)
Mike O'Brien	1500 m freestyle	15:21.04	1 FA	15:05.20	1st place, gold medalist(s)
Rick Carey	100 m backstroke	55.74	1 FA	55.79	1st place, gold medalist(s)
Dave Wilson'	100 m backstroke	56.71	2 FA	56.35	2nd place, silver medalist(s)
Rick Carey	200 m backstroke	1:58.99 OR	1 FA	2:00.23	1st place, gold medalist(s)
Jesse Vassallo	200 m backstroke	2:04.51	9 FB	DNS	
Steve Lundquist	100 m breaststroke	1:03.55	5 FA	1:01.65 WR	1st place, gold medalist(s)
John Moffet	100 m breaststroke	1:02.16 OR	1 FA	1:03.29	5
John Moffet	200 m breaststroke	DNS		Did not advance	
Richard Schroeder	200 m breaststroke	2:19.23	5 FA	2:18.03	4
Matt Gribble	100 m butterfly	55.39	11 FA	DNS	
Pablo Morales	100 m butterfly	53.78 OR	1 FA	53.23	2nd place, silver medalist(s)
Patrick Kennedy	200 m butterfly	2:00.28	8 FA	2:01.03	8
Pablo Morales	200 m butterfly	1:59.19 NR	4 FA	1:57.75	4
Steve Lundquist	200 m individual medley	2:06.10	6 FA	2:04.91	5
Pablo Morales	200 m individual medley	2:04.32	3 FA	2:03.05	2nd place, silver medalist(s)
Jeff Kostoff	400 m individual medley	4:22.55	2 FA	4:23.28	6
Jesse Vassallo	400 m individual medley	4:23.82	6 FA	4:21.46	4
Matt Biondi; Chris Cavanaugh; Rowdy Gaines; Mike Heath; Tom Jager^{[d]} Robin Leamy^{[d]}	4 × 100 m freestyle relay	3:20.14	2 FA	3:19.03 WR	1st place, gold medalist(s)
Jeff Float; Geoff Gaberino^{[d]} Bruce Hays; Mike Heath; David Larson; Richard Saeger^{[d]}	4 × 200 m freestyle relay	7:18.87 OR	1 FA	7:15.69 WR	1st place, gold medalist(s)
Rick Carey; Rowdy Gaines; Mike Heath^{[d]} Tom Jager^{[d]} Steve Lundquist; Pablo Morales; Richard Schroeder^{[d]} Dave Wilson^{[d]}	4 × 100 m medley relay	3:44.33	2 FA	3:39.30 WR	1st place, gold medalist(s)

Women

Athlete	Event	Heat		Final	
Athlete	Event	Time	Rank	Time	Rank
Nancy Hogshead	100 m freestyle	55.85	1 FA	55.92	1st place, gold medalist(s)
Carrie Steinseifer	100 m freestyle	56.46	3 FA	55.92	1st place, gold medalist(s)
Mary Wayte	200 m freestyle	2:00.69	1 FA	1:59.23	1st place, gold medalist(s)
Cynthia Woodhead	200 m freestyle	2:00.85	2 FA	1:59.50	2nd place, silver medalist(s)
Tiffany Cohen	400 m freestyle	4:11.49	1 FA	4:07.10 OR	1st place, gold medalist(s)
Kim Linehan	400 m freestyle	4:15.08	3 FA	4:12.26	4
Tiffany Cohen	800 m freestyle	8:41.86	5 FA	8:24.96 OR	1st place, gold medalist(s)
Michelle Richardson	800 m freestyle	8:32.64	1 FA	8:30.73	2nd place, silver medalist(s)
Theresa Andrews	100 m backstroke	1:02.94	=2 FA	1:02.55	1st place, gold medalist(s)
Betsy Mitchell	100 m backstroke	1:02.53	1 FA	1:02.63	2nd place, silver medalist(s)
Tori Trees	200 m backstroke	2:16.23	5 FA	2:15.73	5
Amy White	200 m backstroke	2:15.40	3 FA	2:13.04	2nd place, silver medalist(s)
Tracy Caulkins	100 m breaststroke	1:11.99	8 FA	1:10.88	4
Susan Rapp	100 m breaststroke	1:11.63	5 FA	1:11.45	7
Susan Rapp	200 m breaststroke	2:33.46	4 FA	2:31.15	2nd place, silver medalist(s)
Kim Rhodenbaugh	200 m breaststroke	2:35.54	=7 FA	2:35.51	8
Jenna Johnson	100 m butterfly	59.99	2 FA	1:00.19	2nd place, silver medalist(s)
Mary T. Meagher	100 m butterfly	59.05 OR	1 FA	59.26	1st place, gold medalist(s)
Nancy Hogshead	200 m butterfly	2:12.10	4 FA	2:11.98	4
Mary T. Meagher	200 m butterfly	2:11.48	1 FA	2:06.90 OR	2nd place, silver medalist(s)
Tracy Caulkins	200 m individual medley	2:14.47 OR	1 FA	2:12.64 OR	1st place, gold medalist(s)
Nancy Hogshead	200 m individual medley	2:16.29	2 FA	2:15.17	2nd place, silver medalist(s)
Tracy Caulkins	400 m individual medley	4:44.42	1 FA	4:39.24	1st place, gold medalist(s)
Sue Heon	400 m individual medley	4:51.32	2 FA	4:49.41	4
Nancy Hogshead; Jenna Johnson; Carrie Steinseifer; Jill Sterkel^{[d]} Dara Torres; Mary Wayte^{[d]}	4 × 100 m freestyle relay	3:43.65 AM	1 FA	3:43.43	1st place, gold medalist(s)
Theresa Andrews; Tracy Caulkins; Nancy Hogshead; Jenna Johnson^{[d]} Mary T. Meagher; Betsy Mitchell^{[d]} Susan Rapp^{[d]} Carrie Steinseifer^{[d]}	4 × 100 m medley relay	4:09.23	1 FA	4:08.34	1st place, gold medalist(s)

^{d} - Athlete swam in the heat but not the final.
Note: Times in the first round ranked across all heats.
Qualification legend: FA – Advance to medal final; FB – Advance to non-medal final

== Synchronized swimming ==
Athlete	Event	Qualification						Final			
Athlete	Event	Technical figure		Free swim		Total		Free swim		Total	
Athlete	Event	Score	Rank	Score	Rank	Score	Rank	Score	Rank	Score	Rank
Tracie Ruiz	Solo	99.467	1	98.200	1	197.667	1 Q	99.000	1	198.467	1st place, gold medalist(s)
Candy Costie; Tracie Ruiz	Duet	96.584	1	98.400	1	194.484	1 Q	99.000	1	195.584	1st place, gold medalist(s)

== Volleyball ==
Summary

Team	Event	Preliminary round					Semifinal	Final / BM	
Team	Event	Opposition Result	Opposition Result	Opposition Result	Opposition Result	Rank	Opposition Result	Opposition Result	Rank
United States men	Men's tournament	Argentina; W 3–1	Tunisia; W 3–0	South Korea; W 3–0	Brazil; L 0–3	2 Q	Canada; W 3–0	Brazil; W 3–1	1st place, gold medalist(s)
United States women	Women's tournament	West Germany; W 3–0	Brazil; W 3–2	China; W 3–1	—N/a	1 Q	Peru; W 3–0	China; L 1–3	2nd place, silver medalist(s)

=== Men's tournament ===
Roster
The following volleyball players represented the United States:

- Dusty Dvorak
- Dave Saunders
- Steve Salmons
- Paul Sunderland
- Rich Duwelius
- Steve Timmons
- Craig Buck
- Marc Waldie
- Chris Marlowe (c)
- Aldis Berzins
- Pat Powers
- Karch Kiraly

Preliminary round

Pos	Team	Pld	W	L	Pts	SW	SL	SR	SPW	SPL	SPR	Qualification
1	Brazil	4	3	1	7	10	4	2.500	191	144	1.326	Semifinals
2	United States	4	3	1	7	9	4	2.250	168	117	1.436	Semifinals
3	South Korea	4	3	1	7	9	6	1.500	203	162	1.253	5th–8th semifinals
4	Argentina	4	1	3	5	7	9	0.778	184	207	0.889	5th–8th semifinals
5	Tunisia	4	0	4	4	0	12	0.000	64	180	0.356	9th place match

- Defeated Argentina (3-1)
- Defeated Tunisia (3-0)
- Defeated South Korea (3-0)
- Lost to Brazil (0-3)

Semifinal

- Defeated Canada (3-0)

Gold medal match

- Defeated Brazil (3-1)

=== Women's tournament ===
Roster

- Paula Weishoff
- Susan Woodstra
- Rita Crockett
- Laura Flachmeier
- Carolyn Becker
- Flo Hyman
- Rose Magers
- Julie Vollertsen
- Debbie Green-Vargas
- Kimberly Ruddins
- Jeanne Beauprey
- Linda Chisholm
- Head coach: Arie Selinger

Preliminary round

Pos	Team	Pld	W	L	Pts	SW	SL	SR	SPW	SPL	SPR	Qualification
1	United States	3	3	0	6	9	3	3.000	167	139	1.201	1st–4th semifinals
2	China	3	2	1	5	7	3	2.333	144	101	1.426	1st–4th semifinals
3	West Germany	3	1	2	4	3	6	0.500	93	126	0.738	5th–8th semifinals
4	Brazil	3	0	3	3	2	9	0.222	120	158	0.759	5th–8th semifinals

- Defeated West Germany (3-0)
- Defeated Brazil (3-2)
- Defeated China (3-1)

Semifinal

- Defeated Peru (3-0)

Gold medal match

- Lost to China (1-3)

== Water polo ==
Summary

Team	Event	Preliminary round				Final round				
Team	Event	Opposition Result	Opposition Result	Opposition Result	Rank	Opposition Result	Opposition Result	Opposition Result	Opposition Result	Rank
United States men	Men's tournament	Greece; W 12–5	Brazil; W 10–4	Spain; W 10–8	1 Q	Netherlands; W 8–7	Australia; W 12–7	West Germany; W 8–7	Yugoslavia; T 5–5	2nd place, silver medalist(s)

Roster
The following players represented the United States:

Head coach: (United States) Monte Nitzkowski

No.	Name	Pld	Gls	Height	Weight	Date of birth	1984 club
1	Craig Wilson	7	0	1.95 m (6 ft 5 in)	86 kg (190 lb)	5 February 1957	
2	Kevin Robertson	7	13	1.75 m (5 ft 9 in)	75 kg (165 lb)	2 February 1959	(United States) California Golden Bears
3	Gary Figueroa	7	8	1.83 m (6 ft 0 in)	77 kg (170 lb)	28 September 1956	(United States) Newport Water Polo Foundation
4	Peter Campbell	7	4	1.93 m (6 ft 4 in)	89 kg (196 lb)	21 May 1960	
5	Doug Burke	7	3	1.83 m (6 ft 0 in)	82 kg (181 lb)	30 March 1957	
6	Joseph Vargas	7	5	1.90 m (6 ft 3 in)	89 kg (196 lb)	4 October 1955	(United States) Newport Water Polo Foundation
7	Jon Svendsen	7	1	1.90 m (6 ft 3 in)	93 kg (205 lb)	26 October 1953	(United States) Concord Aquatic Club
8	John Siman	7	3	1.98 m (6 ft 6 in)	91 kg (201 lb)	7 October 1952	
9	Andrew McDonald	7	4	1.95 m (6 ft 5 in)	91 kg (201 lb)	19 October 1955	
10	Terry Schroeder	7	13	1.90 m (6 ft 3 in)	95 kg (209 lb)	9 October 1958	
11	Jody Campbell	7	10	1.90 m (6 ft 3 in)	89 kg (196 lb)	4 March 1960	
12	Timothy Shaw	7	1	1.88 m (6 ft 2 in)	89 kg (196 lb)	8 November 1957	(United States) Cal State Long Beach
13	Christopher Dorst	1	0	1.93 m (6 ft 4 in)	86 kg (190 lb)	5 June 1956	

Preliminary round

Qualified for second group stage

Team	GP	W	D	L	GF	GA	GD	Pts
United States	3	3	0	0	32	17	+15	6
Spain	3	2	0	1	39	31	+8	4
Greece	3	0	1	2	23	33	–10	1
Brazil	3	0	1	2	25	38	−13	1

- Defeated Greece (12-5)
- Defeated Brazil (10-4)
- Defeated Spain (10-8)

Final round

	Team	Points	G	W	D	L	GF	GA	Diff
1.	Yugoslavia	9	5	4	1	0	47	33	+14
2.	United States	9	5	4	1	0	43	34	+9
3.	West Germany	5	5	2	1	2	49	34	+15
4.	Spain	4	5	1	2	2	42	46	–4
5.	Australia	3	5	1	1	3	37	48	–11
6.	Netherlands	0	5	0	0	5	25	48	–23

- Defeated Netherlands (8-7)
- Defeated Australia (12-7)
- Defeated West Germany (8-7)
- Drew with Yugoslavia (5-5)

== Weightlifting ==
Athlete	Event	Snatch		Clean & jerk		Total	
Athlete	Event	Weight	Rank	Weight	Rank	Weight	Rank
Albert Hood	–56 kg	112.5	4	130.0	=10	242.5	8
Donald Abrahamson	–67.5 kg	122.5	=11	155.0	13	277.5	13
Arn Kritsky	–82.5 kg	140.0	=9	175.0	=8	315.0	9
Tommy Calandro	–90 kg	142.5	21	172.5	20	315.0	19
Derrick Crass	–90 kg	NVL		Did not advance		DNF	
Ken Clark	–100 kg	155.0	=9	197.5	=4	352.5	5
Rich Shanko	–100 kg	155.0	=9	195.0	6	350.0	7
Guy Carlton	–110 kg	167.5	=3	210.0	3	377.5	3rd place, bronze medalist(s)
Ric Eaton	–110 kg	152.5	=9	200.0	=5	352.5	6
Mario Martinez	+110 kg	185.0	1	225.0	2	410.0	2nd place, silver medalist(s)

== Wrestling ==
Key:

- TO – Victory by fall.
- PP – Decision by points – the loser with technical points.
- PO – Decision by points – the loser without technical points.
- ST – Technical superiority – a margin of victory of at least 12 points.
- SP - Technical superiority - a margin of victory between 8 and 11 points, the loser with technical points.
- SO - Technical superiority - a margin of victory between 8 and 11 points, the loser without technical points.
- DC - Judges' decision, no technical points scored by either wrestler
- DQ - Decision by forfeit
- PA - Decision by injury
- PZ - Loser disqualified for passivity, no technical points scored by either wrestler.
- P1 - Loser disqualified for passivity, winner leading by 7 points or less.
- Q – Qualify to gold medal bout
- q – Qualify to bronze medal bout

Athlete	Event	Group stage							Final / BM / Pl.	
Athlete	Event	Opposition Result	Opposition Result	Opposition Result	Opposition Result	Opposition Result	Opposition Result	Rank	Opposition Result	Rank
Bobby Weaver	Freestyle 48 kg	Heugabel (FRG); W 4–0^{TO}	Gao (CHN); W 4–0^{ST}	—N/a				1 Q	Irie (JPN); W 4–0^{TO}	1st place, gold medalist(s)
Joe Gonzales	Freestyle 52 kg	Trstena (YUG); L 1–3^{PP}	Moores (GBR); W 4–0^{TO}	Singh (IND); L 0–4^{TO}	Did not advance	—N/a		4	Did not advance	
Barry Davis	Freestyle 57 kg	Guan (CHN); W 4–0^{ST}	Hawkins (NZL); W 4–0^{ST}	Kim (KOR); W 3.5–0.5^{SP}	Šorov (YUG); W 3–1^{PP}	Bye	—N/a	1 Q	Tomiyama (JPN); L 1–3^{PP}	2nd place, silver medalist(s)
Randy Lewis	Freestyle 62 kg	Dunbar (GBR); W 4–0^{ST}	Brown (AUS); W 4–0^{ST}	Singh (IND); W 4–0^{ST}	La Bruna (ITA); W 4–0^{ST}	Bye	—N/a	1 Q	Akaishi (JPN); W 4–0^{ST}	1st place, gold medalist(s)
Andrew Rein	Freestyle 68 kg	Athanasiadis (GRE); W 3.5–0.5^{SP}	Bye	Neyer (SUI); W 3.5–0.5^{SP}	Kelevitz (AUS); W 3–0^{PO}	Rauhala (FIN); W 3–0^{PO}	Bye	1 Q	You (KOR); L 1–3^{PP}	2nd place, silver medalist(s)
Dave Schultz	Freestyle 74 kg	Rauhala (FIN); W 3.5–0.5^{SP}	Coleman (NZL); W 4–0^{ST}	Salas (COL); W 4–0^{ST}	Sejdi (YUG); W 4–0^{TO}	Bye	Han (KOR); W 3–0^{PO}	1 Q	Knosp (FRG); W 3–1^{PP}	1st place, gold medalist(s)
Mark Schultz	Freestyle 82 kg	Karabacak (TUR); L 0–4^{DQ}	Reinsfield (NZL); W 3.5–0.5^{SP}	Rinke (CAN); W 3–1^{PP}	Ortelli (ITA); W 4–0^{TO}	Bye	—N/a	1Q	Nagashima (JPN); W 4–0^{ST}	1st place, gold medalist(s)
Ed Banach	Freestyle 90 kg	Lins (AUT); W 4–0^{ST}	Temiz (TUR); W 3.5–0.0^{SO}	Davis (CAN); W 3.5–0.5^{SP}	Maruwala (PAK); W 4–0^{TO}	Bye	—N/a	1 Q	Ota (JPN); W 4–0^{ST}	1st place, gold medalist(s)
Lou Banach	Freestyle 100 kg	Sezgin (TUR); W 4–0^{TO}	Sarr (SEN); W 4–0^{TO}	Brightwell (CAN); W 3.5–0.5^{SP}	Honda (JPN); W 4–0^{TO}	—N/a		1 Q	Atiyeh (SYR); W 4–0^{ST}	1st place, gold medalist(s)
Bruce Baumgartner	Freestyle +100 kg	Andrei (ROU); W 4–0^{TO}	Taşkin (TUR); W 4–0^{TO}	—N/a				1 Q	Molle (CAN); W 3.5–0.5^{SP}	1st place, gold medalist(s)
Mark Fuller	Greco-Roman 48 kg	Li (CHN); L 1–3^{PP}	Bora (TUR); L 1–3^{PP}	Did not advance		—N/a		5	Did not advance	
Frank Famiano	Greco-Roman 57 kg	Severion (DOM); W 4–0^{ST}	Bahena (MEX); W 4–0^{ST}	Karadağ (TUR); W 4–0^{ST}	Zamfir (ROU); L 0–3^{P1}	Pasarelli (FRG); L 0–4^{ST}	—N/a	3	5th place final Ljungbeck (SWE); W 4–0^{PA}	5
Abdurrahim Kuzu	Greco-Roman 62 kg	Brekke (NOR); W 3–0^{PO}	Özgür (TUR); W 3.5–0.5^{SP}	Johansson (SWE); W 3–1^{PP}	Gabriel (FRG); W 3–0^{P1}	Yeats (CAN); L 1–3^{DC}	Bye	2 q	Bronze medal final Dietsche (SUI); L 1–3^{PP}	4
James Martinez	Greco-Roman 68 kg	Papadopoulos (GRE); W 4–0^{TO}	Svensson (SWE); W 4–0^{TO}	Bye	Al-Nakdali (SYR); W 3–1^{PP}	Sipilä (FIN); L 1–3^{PP}	—N/a	2 q	Bronze medal final Negrişan (ROU); W 4–0^{TO}	3rd place, bronze medalist(s)
Christopher Catalfo	Greco-Roman 74 kg	Kim (KOR); L 1–3^{PP}	Awarke (LIB); W 4–0^{DQ}	Helbing (FRG); W 3.5–0.5^{SP}	Tallroth (SWE); L 0.5–3.5^{SP}	Did not advance	—N/a	4	Did not advance	
Daniel Chandler	Greco-Roman 82 kg	Claeson (SWE); L 0–3^{PO}	Draica (ROU); L 0–3^{P1}	Did not advance			—N/a	7	Did not advance	
Steve Fraser	Greco-Roman 90 kg	Bye	Kopas (YUG); W 3–1^{PP}	Hannula (FIN); W 3–0^{P1}	Andersson (SWE); W 3–1^{PP}	Pozidis (GRE); W 3–1^{PP}	—N/a	1 Q	Matei (ROU); W 3–1^{PP}	1st place, gold medalist(s)
Greg Gibson	Greco-Roman 100 kg	Fujita (JPN); W 4–0^{ST}	Gerdsmeier (FRG); W 3–1^{PP}	Tertei (YUG); W 3–1^{PP}	—N/a			1 Q	Andrei (ROU); L 0–4^{ST}	2nd place, silver medalist(s)
Jeff Blatnick	Greco-Roman +100 kg	Memišević (YUG); W 3–0^{P1}	Poikilidis (GRE); L 1–3^{PP}	Bye	—N/a			1 Q	Johansson (SWE); W 3–0^{PO}	1st place, gold medalist(s)

== See also ==
- United States at the 1983 Pan American Games
- United States at the 1984 Summer Paralympics
