= Robert Cattrall =

British field hockey player (born 1957)

Bob Cattrall
Personal information
- Born: 10 October 1957 (age 68) Braintree, Essex, England
- Height: 182 cm (6 ft 0 in)
- Weight: 75 kg (165 lb)

Sport
- Sport: Field hockey
- Position: Sweeper
Senior career
Years	Team	Caps	Goals
1979–1984	Southgate	-	-
1984–1985	Hounslow	-	-
National team
Years	Team	Caps	Goals
–	Great Britain		-
–	Wales		-
Medal record
Men's field hockey
Representing Great Britain
Olympic Games
Bronze medal – third place	1984 Los Angeles	Team competition
Champions Trophy
Bronze medal – third place	1978 Lahore	Team competition
Bronze medal – third place	1984 Karachi	Team competition

Robert Lewis Cattrall (born 10 October 1957) is a former field hockey player, who won the bronze medal at the 1984 Summer Olympics.

== Biography ==
Cattrall was educated at Felsted School. He played club hockey for Southgate Hockey Club in the Men's England Hockey League and was a sweeper and penalty corner specialist.

He played for Wales at the 1978 Men's EuroHockey Nations Championship and was part of the bronze medal winning Great Britain team at the inaugural 1978 Men's Hockey Champions Trophy in Lahore, Pakistan.

He was selected for the Great Britain team for the 1980 Olympic Games in Moscow, but subsequently did not attend due to the boycott.

He also played in the 1980 Men's Hockey Champions Trophy before moving to and living in Australia for four years. He returned to Southgate in time to seal a place on the 1984 Olympic team.

At the 1984 Olympic Games in Los Angeles, he represented Great Britain and won a bronze medal with the team. After the Olympics he moved from Southgate to play for Hounslow Hockey Club and was part of the bronze medal winning Great Britain team that competed at the 1984 Men's Hockey Champions Trophy, in Karachi, Pakistan.
