= Laurie Gallen =

New Zealand field hockey player

Personal information
- Nationality: New Zealand
- Born: January 18, 1982 (age 44) Lower Hutt, Wellington, New Zealand
- Height: 172 cm (5 ft 8 in)
- Weight: 152 lb (69 kg; 10 st 12 lb)

Sport
- Sport: Field Hockey

Laurence "Laurie" Charles Gallen (born 18 January 1962, in Lower Hutt) is a former male field hockey player from New Zealand, who was a member of the New Zealand men's national field hockey team that finished seventh at the 1984 Summer Olympics in Los Angeles. As a child he played for Hutt Hockey Club in his hometown.
