= Cees Jan Diepeveen =

Dutch field hockey player

Personal information
- Born: 24 July 1956 (age 69) Amsterdam, North Holland
Medal record
Men's field hockey
Representing the Netherlands
Olympic Games
Bronze medal – third place	1988 Seoul	Team competition
World Cup
Gold medal – first place	1990 Lahore	Team competition

Cees Jan Diepeveen (born 24 July 1956 in Amsterdam, North Holland) is a former field hockey player from the Netherlands, who participated in three Summer Olympics: in Los Angeles (1984), in Seoul (1988) and finally in Barcelona (1992). In 1988 he was a member of the team that won the bronze medal in South Korea, after defeating Australia (2–1) in the Bronze Medal Game.
