= Peter van Asbeck =

Dutch field hockey player

Baron Henrik Jan Peter van Asbeck (born 26 December 1954 in The Hague) is a former field hockey player from The Netherlands. Van Asbeck is best known as a member of the Dutch National Team that finished sixth in the 1984 Summer Olympics in Los Angeles, California.

== Family ==
Van Asbeck's younger brother, Ewout, was also a member of the Dutch squad that competed in the 1984 Olympic Games held in Los Angeles.

== Career ==
Van Asbeck earned a total number of eighteen caps, scoring two goals, in the years 1983-1984. He retired from international competition after the 1984 Olympic Games.
