= Stuart Grimshaw =

New Zealand field hockey player

Stuart Ian Grimshaw (born 16 June 1961) is a former field hockey player from New Zealand, who was a member of the national team that finished seventh at the 1984 Summer Olympics in Los Angeles, California. He was born in Auckland, New Zealand.

He is now CEO of EZCORP Inc.
