= Joaquim Carvalho (field hockey) =

Indian field hockey player

Personal information
- Full name: Joaquim Martin Carvalho
- Nationality: Indian
- Born: 16 August 1959 (age 67)

Sport
- Sport: Field hockey
Medal record
Representing India
Men's field hockey
Asian Games
Silver medal – second place	1982 Delhi	Team
Champions Trophy
Bronze medal – third place	1982 Amstelveen

Joaquim Martin Carvalho (born 16 August 1959) is an Indian former field hockey player, Olympian, captain of the Indian Hockey Team, and Men's National Team coach. He competed in the men's tournament at the 1984 Summer Olympics.

He is one of the most decorated personalities in Indian Hockey having represented India at major international events both as a player and coach.

He has represented India through the men's national hockey team at the 1984 L.A. Olympics, 1986 World Cup, 1985 Asia Cup, 1983 & 1985 Sultan Azlan Shah, 1982 Esanda Cup Australia, 1982 Asian Games, and 1981, 1983, 1984 & 1985 Hockey Champions Trophy.

He has led the Men's national hockey team as coach at the 2008 Olympic Qualifiers, 2007 Asia Cup, 2007 Champions Challenge, 2007 Sultan Azlan Shah, 2007 Indo Belgium Series, and 2008 Four Nations Tournament Perth & Darwin.

He has been included in the World XI and Asian All Star teams of the year. He was also appointed by the government as an Observer and National Selector for Indian Hockey.

== Personal life ==
Joaquim Carvalho was born on 16 August 1959 in Mumbai, India. He is from a Goan family though born and raised in Mumbai. He studied in St. Andrews High School till Std. X, in St. Stanislaus till Std. XII and graduated with a Bachelor of Arts from Khalsa College.

Joaquim Carvalho is married to Indian former Olympian and Asian Games Gold Medalist, Vandana Rao. The couple have one proud son and continue to live in mumbai.

== Field hockey ==
Joaquim Carvalho was a robust centre half and a penalty stroke specialist during his playing days. He has played over 200 games for the men's national hockey team.

=== As a player ===
Joaquim Carvalho has won major honours at the international level such as gold medal in the 1985 Sultan Azlan Shah, silver medal in the 1982 Asian Games, 1983 Esanda Cup Australia, 1983 Sultan Azlan Shah, and 1985 Asia Cup, and bronze in the 1981 Champions Trophy.

=== As a coach ===
Joaquim Carvalho was appointed chief coach of the men's national hockey team with an uphill challenge to turn the fortunes of a team that was at its lowest following a number of poor performances under the former coach who stepped down. Facing the challenge head on he went on to win major honours with the team such as gold medal in the 2007 Asia Cup and 2007 Indo Belgium Series, silver medal in the 2008 Olympics Qualifiers, and bronze in the 2007 Champions League and 2007 Sultan Azlan Shah.

== Recognition ==
He is highly recognised for his contribution to Indian hockey which is complimented by him being awarded the Arjuna Award, Shiv Chatrapathi Award, Gaurav Puruskar.

Many high-profile Indian hockey personalities such as Dhanraj Pillay, Harinder Singh, Sardara Singh, Dilip Tirkey, V.R. Raghunath, and many others have credited Joaquim Carvalho as being their mentor and coach, who helped them in achieving their success in the field of hockey.
