= Ernie Cholakis =

Canadian field hockey player (born 1962)

Ernest ("Ernie") Cholakis (born September 17, 1962 in Winnipeg, Manitoba) is a former field hockey player from Canada, who participated in the 1984 Summer Olympics in Los Angeles, California. There he finished in tenth place with the Men's National Team.

== International senior competitions ==
- 1984 – Olympic Games, Los Angeles (10th)
