= Nigel Patmore =

Australian field hockey player

Personal information
- Born: 4 September 1960 (age 65)
Medal record
Men's field hockey
Representing Australia
World Cup
Gold medal – first place	1986 London	Team
Champions Trophy
Gold medal – first place	1983 Karachi	Team

Nigel Patmore (born 4 September 1960) is a former field hockey player from Australia. He was the member of the winning Australian team in 1986 World Cup and 1983 Champions Trophy. He also was the member of team which ranked fourth in the Field Hockey tournament of 1984 Summer Olympics.

His son Jake Patmore plays Australian rules football for North Adelaide in the South Australian Football League (SANFL) after being drafted by Port Adelaide in the Australian Football League from Claremont in the West Australian Football League (WAFL).
