= Ewout van Asbeck =

Dutch field hockey player

Baron Willem Ewout van Asbeck (born August 5, 1956 in The Hague) is a former field hockey player from the Netherlands, who was a member of the Dutch National Team that finished sixth in the 1984 Summer Olympics in Los Angeles. His brother Peter was also part of the Holland squad, that competed in California. Van Asbeck earned a total number of 108 caps, scoring eleven goals, in the years 1978-1984. After the LA Games he retired from international competition.
