= Arno den Hartog =

Dutch field hockey player

Arnold Pieter Bernard "Arno" den Hartog (born 8 November 1954 in Oss) is a former field hockey player from the Netherlands. He was a member of the Dutch National Team that finished sixth in the 1984 Summer Olympics in Los Angeles.

Between 1979-1985 Den Hartog earned a total number of 109 caps and scored seventeen goals. After his hockey career he worked for the Royal Dutch Field Hockey Federation.
