= Christopher Otambo =

Kenyan field hockey player

Personal information
- Nationality: Kenyan
- Born: 7 February 1960 (age 66)

Sport
- Sport: Field hockey

Christopher Otambo (born 7 February 1960) is a Kenyan field hockey player. He competed at the 1984 Summer Olympics in Los Angeles, where the Kenyan team placed ninth. He also competed at the 1988 Summer Olympics in Seoul.
