= Tam Chew Seng =

Malaysian field hockey player (born 1956)

Tam Chiew Seng
Personal information
- Nationality: Malaysian
- Born: 22 January 1956 (age 70)

Sport
- Sport: Field hockey
Medal record
Men's field hockey
Representing Malaysia
Asian Games
Bronze medal – third place	1978 Bangkok	Team
Bronze medal – third place	1982 New Delhi	Team

Tam Chiew Seng (born 22 January 1956) is a Malaysian field hockey player. He competed in the men's tournament at the 1984 Summer Olympics.
