= Vineet Kumar Sharma =

Indian field hockey player (born 1959)

Personal information
- Nationality: Indian
- Born: 6 January 1959 (age 67)
- Spouse: Tara Appachu Sharma
- Children: Vitash Sharma

Sport
- Sport: Field hockey
Medal record
Representing India
Men's field hockey
Asian Games
Silver medal – second place	1982 Delhi	Team
Bronze medal – third place	1986 Seoul	Team

Vineet Kumar Sharma (born 6 January 1959) is an Indian field hockey player. He competed at the 1984 Summer Olympics in Los Angeles, where the Indian team placed fifth.
