= Shurentheran Murugesan =

Malaysian field hockey player (born 1956)

Personal information
- Nationality: Malaysian
- Born: 30 March 1956 (age 70)

Sport
- Sport: Field hockey

Shurentheran Murugesan (born 30 March 1956) is a Malaysian field hockey player. He competed in the men's tournament at the 1984 Summer Olympics.
