= Ignacio Cobos =

Spanish field hockey player (born 1966)

Personal information
- Born: 12 June 1966 (age 60) Madrid, Spain
Medal record
Men's field hockey
Representing Spain
Olympic Games
Silver medal – second place	1996 Atlanta	Team competition

Ignacio Cobos Vidal (born 12 June 1966) is a Spanish former field hockey player from Madrid, who won the silver medal with the men's national team at the 1996 Summer Olympics in Atlanta, Georgia, United States.
