= Colin Santa Maria =

Malaysian field hockey player (born 1959)

Personal information
- Nationality: Malaysian
- Born: 23 February 1959 (age 67)

Sport
- Sport: Field hockey

Colin Santa Maria (born 23 February 1959) is a Malaysian field hockey player. He competed in the men's tournament at the 1984 Summer Olympics.
