= Andrew Stone (field hockey) =

American field hockey player

Personal information
- Born: November 23, 1960 (age 65) Boston, Massachusetts, United States

Sport
- Sport: Field hockey

Andrew Stone (born November 23, 1960) is an American field hockey player. He competed in the men's tournament at the 1984 Summer Olympics.

== Career ==
He graduated from Harvard College.
