= Parminder Singh Saini (field hockey) =

Kenyan field hockey player (1957–2021)

Personal information
- National team: Kenya
- Born: 19 September 1957 Kisumu, British Kenya
- Died: 30 May 2021 (aged 63) Kisumu, Kenya

Sport
- Sport: Field hockey
- Club: Slough Hockey Club (UK); Kisumu Simba Union (Kenya)

Parminder Singh Saini (19 September 1957 – 30 May 2021) was a Kenyan field hockey player. He competed at the 1984 Summer Olympics and the 1988 Summer Olympics.
