= Sukhvinderjeet Singh Kulwant =

Malaysian field hockey player (born 1960)

Personal information
- Nationality: Malaysian
- Born: 29 October 1960 (age 65)

Sport
- Sport: Field hockey

Sukhvinderjeet Singh Kulwant (born 29 October 1960) is a Malaysian field hockey player. He competed in the men's tournament at the 1984 Summer Olympics.
