= Jaime Arbós =

Spanish field hockey player (born 1952)

Personal information
- Born: 29 February 1952 (age 74)
Medal record
Men's Field Hockey
Representing Spain
Olympic Games
Silver medal – second place	1980 Moscow	Team competition

Jaime Arbós Serra (born 29 February 1952) is a former field hockey player from Spain, who won the silver medal with the Men's National Team at the 1980 Summer Olympics in Moscow. He competed in four Olympics for Spain, starting in 1972.
