= Manzar Iqbal =

American field hockey player (born 1958)

Personal information
- Nationality: American
- Born: 21 December 1958 (age 67) London, United Kingdom

Sport
- Country: United States
- Sport: Field hockey

Manzar Iqbal (born 21 December 1958) is an American field hockey player. He competed for the United States at the 1984 Summer Olympics in Los Angeles.
