= Sarjit Singh Kundan =

Malaysian hockey player (1962–2026)

Sarjit Singh Kundan Singh

Personal information
- Nationality: Malaysian
- Born: 24 November 1962
- Died: 23 August 2026 (aged 63)

Sport
- Sport: Field hockey
Medal record
Men's field hockey
Representing Malaysia
Asian Games
Bronze medal – third place	1982 New Delhi	Team
Bronze medal – third place	1990 Beijing	Team

Sarjit Singh Kundan Singh (24 November 1962 – 23 August 2026) was a Malaysian field hockey player and coach. He competed at the 1984 Summer Olympics and the 1992 Summer Olympics. Kundan was the head coach of the Malaysia national field hockey team. He died on 23 August 2026, at the age of 63.
