= Michael Newton (field hockey) =

American field hockey player

Michael Douglas Newton (born May 10, 1952) was an American field hockey player, who competed at the 1984 Summer Olympics in Los Angeles.

Newton was born in Penticton, British Columbia, Canada. His brother Gary Newton was one of his Olympic teammates.
