= Brian Spencer (field hockey) =

American field hockey player

Personal information
- Nationality: American
- Born: 5 March 1962 (age 64) Van Nuys, California

Sport
- Sport: Field hockey

Brian Spencer (born 5 March 1962) is an American field hockey player. He was born in Van Nuys California. He competed at the 1984 Summer Olympics in Los Angeles.
