= Ow Soon Kooi =

Malaysian field hockey player (born 1954)

Personal information
- Nationality: Malaysian
- Born: 19 October 1954 (age 71)

Sport
- Sport: Field hockey
Medal record
Men's field hockey
Representing Malaysia
Asian Games
Bronze medal – third place	1974 Tehran	Team

Ow Soon Kooi (born 19 October 1954) is a Malaysian field hockey player. He competed at the 1976 Summer Olympics and the 1984 Summer Olympics.
