= Gary Newton =

American field hockey player

Gary Basil Newton (born December 12, 1957) is an American field hockey player. He competed for the U.S. at the 1984 Summer Olympics. His brother Michael was one of his teammates at the Olympics. He was born in British Columbia, Canada.
