= Michael Chew =

Malaysian field hockey player (born 1962)

Personal information
- Full name: Michael Chew Kok Keong
- Nationality: Malaysian
- Born: 9 June 1962 (age 64) Melaka

Sport
- Sport: Field hockey
Medal record
Men's field hockey
Representing Malaysia
Asian Games
Bronze medal – third place	1982 New Delhi	Team

Michael Chew (born 9 June 1962) is a Malaysian field hockey player. He competed at the 1984 Summer Olympics in Los Angeles, where the Malaysian team placed 11th.
