= Canada at the 1984 Summer Olympics =

- IOC code: CAN
- NOC: Canadian Olympic Committee

in Los Angeles 28 July–12 August 1984
- Competitors: 408 (257 men, 151 women) in 23 sports
- Flag bearer: Alex Baumann
- Medals Ranked 6th: Gold 10 Silver 18 Bronze 16 Total 44

Summer Olympics appearances (overview)
- ~~1900~~; 1904; 1908; 1912; 1920; 1924; 1928; 1932; 1936; 1948; 1952; 1956; 1960; 1964; 1968; 1972; 1976; 1980; 1984; 1988; 1992; 1996; 2000; 2004; 2008; 2012; 2016; 2020; 2024; 2028

Other related appearances
- 1906 Intercalated Games

Canada competed at the 1984 Summer Olympics in Los Angeles, United States, held from 28 July to 12 August 1984. Canada returned to the Summer Games after having participated in the American-led boycott of the 1980 Summer Olympics. 408 competitors, 257 men and 151 women, took part in 193 events in 23 sports.

Partly due to the Soviet Union-led boycott of these Games, Canada enjoyed its best-ever results at the Summer Games, coming in sixth place in the number of Gold medals won, and fourth place in the total medals won - double their second best total in 1996 and 2016.

== Medallists ==
Medal	Name	Sport	Event	Date
Gold	Linda Thom	Shooting	Women's 25 metre pistol	29 July
Gold	Alex Baumann	Swimming	Men's 400 metre individual medley	30 July
Gold	Anne Ottenbrite	Swimming	Women's 200 metre breaststroke	30 July
Gold	Victor Davis	Swimming	Men's 200 metre breaststroke	2 August
Gold	Alex Baumann	Swimming	Men's 200 metre individual medley	4 August
Gold	Dean Crawford; Mark Evans; Mike Evans; Blair Horn; Grant Main; Brian McMahon; Kevin Neufeld; Paul Steele; Pat Turner	Rowing	Men's eight	5 August
Gold	Sylvie Bernier	Diving	Women's 3 metre springboard	6 August
Gold	Larry Cain	Canoeing	Men's C-1 500 metres	10 August
Gold	Hugh Fisher; Alwyn Morris	Canoeing	Men's K-2 1000 metres	11 August
Gold	Lori Fung	Gymnastics	Women's rhythmic individual all-around	11 August
Silver	Steve Bauer	Cycling	Men's individual road race	29 July
Silver	Victor Davis	Swimming	Men's 100 metre breaststroke	29 July
Silver	Curt Harnett	Cycling	Men's 1 km time trial	30 July
Silver	Anne Ottenbrite	Swimming	Women's 100 metre breaststroke	2 August
Silver	Jacques Demers	Weightlifting	Men's 75 kg	2 August
Silver	Betty Craig; Tricia Smith	Rowing	Women's coxless pair	4 August
Silver	Barbara Armbrust; Marilyn Brain; Angela Schneider; Lesley Thompson-Willie; Jane Tregunno	Rowing	Women's coxed four	4 August
Silver	Victor Davis; Sandy Goss; Tom Ponting; Mike West	Swimming	Men's 4 × 100 metre medley relay	4 August
Silver	Evert Bastet; Terry McLaughlin	Sailing	Flying Dutchman	8 August
Silver	Sharon Hambrook; Kelly Kryczka	Synchronized swimming	Women's duet	9 August
Silver	Robert Molle	Wrestling	Men's freestyle +100 kg	10 August
Silver	Alexandra Barré; Sue Holloway	Canoeing	Women's K-2 500 metres	10 August
Silver	Larry Cain	Canoeing	Men's C-1 1000 metres	11 August
Silver	Angela Bailey; France Gareau; Marita Payne; Angella Taylor	Athletics	Women's 4 × 100 metres relay	11 August
Silver	Charmaine Crooks; Molly Killingbeck; Marita Payne; Jillian Richardson; Dana Wright*	Athletics	Women's 4 × 400 metres relay	11 August
Silver	Shawn O'Sullivan	Boxing	Men's light middleweight	11 August
Silver	Willie deWit	Boxing	Men's heavyweight	11 August
Silver	Carolyn Waldo	Synchronized swimming	Women's solo	12 August
Bronze	Cam Henning	Swimming	Men's 200 metre backstroke	31 July
Bronze	Mike West	Swimming	Men's 100 metre backstroke	3 August
Bronze	Reema Abdo; Michelle MacPherson; Anne Ottenbrite; Pam Rai	Swimming	Women's 4 × 100 metre medley relay	3 August
Bronze	Daniele Laumann; Silken Laumann	Rowing	Women's double sculls	4 August
Bronze	Ben Johnson	Athletics	Men's 100 metres	4 August
Bronze	Robert Mills	Rowing	Men's single sculls	5 August
Bronze	Bruce Ford; Doug Hamilton; Mike Hughes; Phil Monckton	Rowing	Men's quadruple sculls	5 August
Bronze	Terry Neilson	Sailing	Finn	8 August
Bronze	Stephen Calder; Hans Fogh; John Kerr	Sailing	Soling	8 August
Bronze	Dale Walters	Boxing	Men's bantamweight	9 August
Bronze	Hugh Fisher; Alwyn Morris	Canoeing	Men's K-2 500 metres	10 August
Bronze	Lynn Williams	Athletics	Women's 3000 metres	10 August
Bronze	Mark Berger	Judo	Men's +95 kg	10 August
Bronze	Alexandra Barré; Lucie Guay; Sue Holloway; Barbara Olmsted	Canoeing	Women's K-4 500 metres	11 August
Bronze	Sterling Hinds; Ben Johnson; Tony Sharpe; Desai Williams	Athletics	Men's 4 × 100 metres relay	11 August
Bronze	Chris Rinke	Wrestling	Men's freestyle 82 kg	11 August

== Archery ==
Women's individual competition:

- Linda Kazienko – 2421 points (→ 25th place)
- Lucile Lemay – 2379 points (→ 33rd place)
- Wanda Sadegur – 2349 points (→ 36th place)

== Athletics ==
Men's Competition

Men's 100 metres

- Ben Johnson
- Tony Sharpe
- Desai Williams

Men's 200 metres

- Atlee Mahorn
- Tony Sharpe
- Desai Williams

Men's 400 metres

- Doug Hinds
  - Heat – 46.42
  - Quarterfinals – 46.19 (→ did not advance)
- Tim Bethune
  - Heat – 46.98 (→ did not advance)
- Brian Saunders
  - Heat – 47.40 (→ did not advance)

Men's 800 metres

- Bruce Roberts
- Simon Hoogewerf

Men's 5,000 metres

- Paul Williams
  - Heat – 13:47.56
  - Semifinals – 13:46.34 (→ did not advance)

Men's 10,000 metres

- Paul Williams
  - Qualifying Heat – 28:36.15 (→ did not advance)

Men's marathon

- Art Boileau – 2:22:43 (→ 44th place)
- Alain Bordeleau – 2:34:27 (→ 65th place)
- Dave Edge – did not finish (→ no ranking)

Men's 110 metres Hurdles

- Mark McKoy
- Jeff Glass
- Eric Spence

Men's 400 metres Hurdles

- Lloyd Guss
- Ian Newhouse
- Pierre Léveillé

Men's 3,000 metres Steeplechase

- Greg Duhaime

Men's 4×100 metres relay

- Ben Johnson, Tony Sharpe, Desai Williams and Sterling Hinds

Men's 4×400 metres relay

- Mike Sokolowski, Douglas Hinds, Brian Saunders and Tim Bethune

Men's high jump

- Milton Ottey
  - Qualification – 2.24m
  - Final – 2.29m (→ 6th place)
- Alain Metellus
  - Qualification – 2.18m (→ did not advance)

Men's shot put

- Bishop Dolegiewicz
  - Qualifying Round – 19.00 m
  - Final – 18.39 m (→ 11th place)
- Martino Catalano
  - Qualifying Round – 17.24 m (→ did not advance)

Men's discus throw

- Robert Gray

Men's javelin throw

- Laslo Babits
  - Qualification – 82.18m
  - Final – 80.68m (→ 8th place)

Men's Decathlon

- Dave Steen
  - Final Result – 8047 points (→ 6th place)

Men's 20 km walk

- Guillaume LeBlanc
  - Final – 1:24:29 (→ 4th place)
- François Lapointe
  - Final – 1:27:06 (→ 11th place)
- Marcel Jobin
  - Final – 1:29:49 (→ 21st place)

Men's 50 km walk

- Guillaume LeBlanc
  - Final – DNF (→ no ranking)
- Marcel Jobin
  - Final – DNF (→ no ranking)
- François Lapointe
  - Final – DSQ (→ no ranking)

Women's Competition

Women's 100 metres

- Angela Bailey
- Angella Taylor-Issajenko
- France Gareau

Women's 200 metres

- Angela Bailey

Women's 400 metres

- Marita Wiggins
- Charmaine Crooks
- Molly Killingbeck

Women's 800 metres

- Christine Slythe
- Grace Verbeek
- Ranza Clark

Women's 1,500 metres

- Brit McRoberts
  - Heat – 4:10.64
  - Final – 4:05.98 (→ 7th place)
- Debbie Scott
  - Heat – 4:09.16
  - Final – 4:10.41 (→ 10th place)

Women's 3,000 metres

- Lynn Williams
  - Heat – 8.45.77
  - Final – 8:42.14 (→ Bronze medal)
- Sue French
  - Heat – 9.24.66 (→ did not advance)
- Geri Fitch
  - Heat – 9.07.18 (→ did not advance)

Women's marathon

- Silvia Ruegger
  - Final – 2:29:09 (→ 8th place)
- Anna Marie Malone
  - Final – 2:36:33 (→ 17th place)
- Jacqueline Gareau
  - Final – did not finish (→ no ranking)

Women's 100m hurdles

- Sylvia Forgrave
- Sue Kameli
- Karen Nelson

Women's 400m hurdles

- Andrea Page
  - Heat – 59.09
  - Semifinal – 57.89 (→ did not advance)
- Dana Wright
  - Heat – 58.17 (→ did not advance)

Women's 4×100 metres relay

- Angela Bailey, Angella Taylor-Issajenko, France Gareau and Marita Wiggins

Women's 4×400 metres relay

- Charmaine Crooks, Jillian Briscoe, Molly Killingbeck, Marita Wiggins, and Dana Wright

Women's high jump

- Debbie Brill
  - Qualification – 1.90m
  - Final – 1.94m (→ 5th place)
- Brigitte Reid
  - Qualification – 1.70m (→ did not advance, 27th place)

Women's shot put

- Carmen Ionesco
  - Final – 15.25 m (→ 12th place)

Women's discus throw

- Carmen Ionesco
  - Qualification – 52.28m (→ did not advance)

Women's Heptathlon

- Jill Ross
  - Final Result – 5904 points (→ 15th place)
- Connie Polman-Tuin
  - Final Result – 5648 points (→ 16th place)
- Donna Smellie
  - Final Result – 5638 points (→ 17th place)

== Baseball ==
Canada competed in the Baseball tournament that was held as a demonstration sport. They finished 3rd in their pool, equivalent to 5th overall (tie).

== Basketball ==
Men's team competition

- Preliminary round (group B)
  - Lost to Spain (82-83)
  - Lost to United States (68-89)
  - Defeated PR China (121-80)
  - Defeated Uruguay (95-80)
  - Defeated France (96-69)
- Quarterfinals
  - Defeated Italy (78-72)
- Semifinals
  - Lost to United States (59-78)
- Bronze Medal Game
  - Lost to Yugoslavia (82-88) → Fourth place
- Team roster
  - Howard Kelsey
  - Tony Simms
  - Eli Pasquale
  - Karl Tilleman
  - Gerald Kazanowski
  - Jay Triano
  - John Hatch
  - Gord Herbert
  - Bill Wennington
  - Romel Raffin
  - Greg Wiltjer
  - Dan Meagher

Women's team competition

- Preliminary round
  - Lost to South Korea (62-67)
  - Defeated PR China (66-61)
  - Defeated Australia (56-45)
  - Lost to Yugoslavia (68-69)
  - Lost to United States (61-92)
- Bronze Medal Match
  - Lost to PR China (57-62) → Fourth place
- Team roster
  - Lynn Polson
  - Tracie McAra
  - Anna Pendergast
  - Debbie Huband
  - Carol Jane Sealey
  - Alison Lang
  - Bev Smith
  - Sylvia Sweeney
  - Candi Clarkson-Lohr
  - Toni Kordic
  - Andrea Blackwell
  - Misty Thomas

== Boxing ==
Men's flyweight (– 51 kg)

- Bill Dunlop
  1. First round – lost to Eyüp Can (Turkey), 0:5

Men's bantamweight (– 54 kg)

- Dale Walters → Bronze medal
  1. First round – bye
  2. Second round – defeated Mustapha Kouchene (Algeria), 5:0
  3. Third round – defeated Hiroaki Takami (Japan), 5:0
  4. Quarterfinals – defeated Pedro Decima (Argentina), 5:0
  5. Semifinals – lost to Héctor López (Mexico), 0:5

Men's featherweight (– 57 kg)

- Steve Pagendam
  1. First round – defeated Boubacar Soumana (Nigeria), RSC-3
  2. Second round – lost to Paul Fitzgerald (Ireland), 2:3

Men's lightweight (– 60 kg)

- John Kalbhenn
  1. First round – bye
  2. Second round – defeated Wilson Randrinasolo (MDG), RSC-1
  3. Third Round – lost to Reiner Gies (West Germany), 0:5

Men's Light Welterweight (– 63.5 kg)

- Denis Lambert
  1. First round – bye
  2. Second round – lost to Mirko Puzović (YUG), 0:5

Men's welterweight (– 67 kg)

- Wayne Gordon
  1. First round – lost to Mark Breland (USA), 0:5

Men's Light Middleweight (– 71 kg)

- Shawn O'Sullivan → Silver medal
  1. First round – bye
  2. Second round – defeated Mohamed Halibi (Libya), RSC-2
  3. Third round – defeated Ahn Dal-Ho (South Korea), RSC-1
  4. Quarterfinals – defeated Rod Douglas (Great Britain), 5:0
  5. Semifinals – defeated Christophe Tiozzo (France), 5:0
  6. Final – lost to Frank Tate (USA), 0:5

Men's middleweight (– 75 kg)

- Rick Duff
  1. First round – defeated Brendon Cannon (Australia), 5:0
  2. Second round – lost to Shin Joon-Sup (South Korea), 1:4

Men's Heavyweight (– 91 kg)

- Willie DeWit → Silver medal
  1. First round – bye
  2. Second round – defeated Mohamed Bouchiche (Algeria), 5:0
  3. Quarterfinals – defeated Dodovic Owiny (Kenya), KO-1
  4. Semifinals – defeated Arnold Vanderlyde (Netherlands), 3:2
  5. Final – lost to Henry Tillman (USA), 0:5

Men's Super Heavyweight (+ 91 kg)

- Lennox Lewis
  1. First round – defeated Mohammad Yousuf (Pakistan), RSC-3
  2. Quarterfinals – lost to Tyrell Biggs (USA), 0:5

== Cycling ==
Thirteen cyclists, ten men and three women, represented Canada in 1984.

Men's individual road race

- Steve Bauer – 4:59:57 (→ Silver medal)
- Louis Garneau – +15:30 (→ 33rd place)
- Pierre Harvey – did not finish (→ no ranking)
- Alain Masson – did not finish (→ no ranking)

Team time trial

- Pierre Harvey
- Alain Masson
- Robert Pulfer
- Martin Willock

Sprint

- Alex Ongaro

1000m time trial

- Curt Harnett

Individual pursuit

- Alex Stieda
- Gary Trevisiol

Points race

- Alex Stieda
- Gary Trevisiol

Women's individual road race

- Geneviève Robic-Brunet → 22nd place
- Marie-Claude Audet → 24th place
- Karen Strong-Hearth → 27th place

== Diving ==
Men's 3m springboard

- Randy Sageman
  - Preliminary round – 527.97 (→ did not advance, 14th place)
- Mike Mourant
  - Preliminary round – 476.19 (→ did not advance, 23rd place)

Women

Athlete	Event	Qualification		Final	
Athlete	Event	Points	Rank	Points	Rank
Sylvie Bernier	3 metre springboard	489.51	3 Q	530.70	1st place, gold medalist(s)
Debbie Fuller	10 m platform	364.11	7 Q	371.49	6

== Fencing ==
15 fencers, 10 men and 5 women, represented Canada in 1984.

Men's épée

- Michel Dessureault
- Daniel Perreault
- Jean-Marc Chouinard

Men's team épée

- Jacques Cardyn, Jean-Marc Chouinard, Alain Côté, Michel Dessureault, Daniel Perreault

Men's sabre

- Jean-Paul Banos
- Jean-Marie Banos
- Claude Marcil

Men's team sabre

- Jean-Marie Banos, Jean-Paul Banos, Marc Lavoie, Claude Marcil, Eli Sukunda

Women's foil

- Madeleine Philion
- Jacynthe Poirier
- Caroline Mitchell

== Field hockey ==
Men's team competition

- Preliminary round (group B)
  - Canada – Netherlands 1-4
  - Canada – Great Britain 1-3
  - Canada – Kenya 2-3
  - Canada – Pakistan 1-7
  - Canada – New Zealand 2-2
- Classification matches
  - 9th/12th place: Canada – Malaysia 1-0
  - 9th/10th place: Canada – Kenya 0-1 (after extra time) → 10th place
- Team roster
  - Julian Austin
  - David Bissett
  - Patrick Burrows
  - Pat Caruso
  - Paul "Bubli" Chohan
  - Ernie Cholakis
  - Aaron Fernandes
  - Ken Goodwin (gk)
  - Kip Hladky
  - Bruce MacPherson
  - Reg Plummer
  - Trevor Porritt
  - Harbhajan Rai
  - Ross Rutledge
  - Nick Sandhu
  - Rob Smith
- Head coach: Shiv Jagday

Women's team competition

- Round robin
  - Canada – United States 1-4
  - Canada – West Germany 0-3
  - Canada – Australia 2-1
  - Canada – Netherlands 2-2
  - Canada – New Zealand 4-1 → 5th place
- Team roster
  - Shelley Andrews
  - Lisa Bauer
  - Sharon Bayes (gk)
  - Lynne Beecroft
  - Laura Branchaud
  - Nancy Charlton
  - Sharon Creelman
  - Phyllis Ellis
  - Sheila Forshaw
  - Karen Hewlett
  - Laurie Lambert
  - Zoe MacKinnon (gk)
  - Jean Major
  - Darlene Stoyka
  - Diane Virjee
  - Terry Wheatley
- Head coach: Marina van der Merwe

Women's team foil

- Caroline Mitchell, Shelley Steiner, Madeleine Philion, Jacynthe Poirier, Marie-Huguette Cormier

== Football ==
Men's team competition

- Preliminary round (group B)
  - Canada – Iraq 1 – 1
  - Canada – Yugoslavia 0 – 1
  - Canada – Cameroon 3 – 1
- Quarter Finals
  - Canada – Brazil 1 – 1 (→ Brazil wins 4-2 on penalties)
- Team Roster:
  - ( 1.) Tino Lettieri
  - ( 2.) Bob Lenarduzzi
  - ( 3.) Bruce Wilson
  - ( 4.) Terry Moore
  - ( 5.) Ian Bridge
  - ( 6.) Randy Ragan
  - ( 7.) David Norman
  - ( 8.) Gerry Gray
  - ( 9.) Ken Garraway
  - (10.) Dale Mitchell
  - (11.) Mike Sweeney
  - (12.) Igor Vrablic
  - (13.) Craig Martin
  - (14.) Pasquale De Luca
  - (15.) Paul James
  - (16.) John Catliff
  - (22.) Sven Habermann

== Judo ==
Men's Extra-Lightweight (– 60 kg)

- Phil Takahashi

Men's Half-Lightweight (– 66 kg)

- Brad Farrow

Men's lightweight (– 73 kg)

- Glenn Beauchamp

Men's Half-Middleweight (– 81 kg)

- Kevin Doherty

Men's middleweight (– 90 kg)

- Louis Jani

Men's half-heavyweight (– 100 kg)

- Joseph Meli

Men's Heavyweight (+ 100 kg)

- Mark Berger

Men's Open Class

- Fred Blaney

== Swimming ==
Men's Competition

Men's 100m freestyle

- David Churchill
  - Heat – 51.85 (→ did not advance, 22nd place)
- Blair Hicken
  - Heat – 52.74 (→ did not advance, 29th place)

Men's 200m freestyle

- Peter Szmidt
  - Heat – 1:52.48
  - B-Final – 1:52.56 (→ 14th place)
- Alex Baumann
  - Heat – 1:51.76
  - B-Final – scratched (→ 17th place)

Men's 400m freestyle

- Peter Szmidt
  - Heat – 3:55.65
  - B-Final – 3:56.99 (→ 11th place)
- David Shemilt
  - Heat – 3:58.43 (→ did not advance, 19th place)

Men's 1500m freestyle

- David Shemilt
  - Heat – 15:24.78
  - Final – 15:31.28 (→ 7th place)
- Bernard Volz
  - Heat – 15:31.38 (→ did not advance, 13th place)

Men's 100m Backstroke

- Mike West
  - Heat – 57.76
  - Final – 56.49 (→ Bronze medal)
- Sandy Goss
  - Heat – 57.60
  - Final – 57.46 (→ 7th place)

Men's 200m Backstroke

- Cameron Henning
  - Heat – 2:03.36
  - Final – 2:02.37 (→ Bronze medal)
- Mike West
  - Heat – 2:04.93
  - B-Final – 2:04.73 (→ 10th place)

Men's 100m Breaststroke

- Victor Davis
  - Heat – 1:03.63
  - Final – 1:01.99 (→ Silver medal)
- Marco Veilleux
  - Heat – 1:05.34 (→ did not advance, 19th place)

Men's 200m Breaststroke

- Victor Davis
  - Heat – 2:18.20
  - Final – 2:13.34 (→ Gold medal)
- Ken Fitzpatrick
  - Heat – 2:19.74
  - Final – 2:18.86 (→ 5th place)

Men's 100m Butterfly

- Tom Ponting
  - Heat – 55.23
  - B-Final – 55.31 (→ 9th place)
- Dave Churchill
  - Heat – 55.84 (→ did not advance, 18th place)

Men's 200m Butterfly

- Tom Ponting
  - Heat – 1:59.78
  - Final – 1:59.37 (→ 6th place)
- Peter Ward
  - Heat – 1:59.99
  - Final – 2:00.39 (→ 7th place)

Men's 200m Individual Medley

- Alex Baumann
  - Heat – 2:03.60
  - Final – 2:01.42 (→ Gold medal)
- Rob Chernoff
  - Heat – 2:08.47 (→ did not advance, 21st place)

Men's 400m Individual Medley

- Alex Baumann
  - Heat – 4:22.46
  - Final – 4:17.41 (→ Gold medal)
- Peter Dobson
  - Heat – 4:29.61
  - B-Final – 4:30.09 (→ 14th place)

Men's 4 × 100 m freestyle Relay

- Sandy Goss, Alex Baumann, Blair Hicken, and Levente Mady
  - Heat – 3:25.94
- David Churchill, Blair Hicken, Alex Baumann, and Sandy Goss
  - Final – 3:24.70 (→ 7th place)

Men's 4 × 200 m freestyle Relay

- Sandy Goss, Benoit Clement, Wayne Kelly, and Peter Szmidt
  - Heat – 7:28.31
- Sandy Goss, Wayne Kelly, Peter Szmidt, and Alex Baumann
  - Final – 7:26.51 (→ 5th place)

Men's 4 × 100 m Medley Relay

- Mike West, Victor Davis, Tom Ponting, and Sandy Goss
  - Heat – 3:46.12
  - Final – 3:43.23 (→ Silver medal)

Women's Competition

Women's 100m freestyle

- Pamela Rai
  - Heat – 57.41
  - B-Final – 57.56 (→ 12th place)
- Jane Kerr
  - Heat – 58.46
  - B-Final – 57.85 (→ 14th place)

Women's 200m freestyle

- Julie Daigneault
  - Heat – 2:03.40
  - B-Final – 2:03.67 (→ 11th place)
- Jane Kerr
  - Heat – 2:04.02
  - B-Final – 2:04.19 (→ 14th place)

Women's 400m freestyle

- Julie Daigneault
  - Heat – 4:16.60
  - Final – 4:16.41 (→ 8th place)
- Donna McGinnis
  - Heat – 4:19.48
  - B-Final – 4:15.59 (→ 10th place)

Women's 800m freestyle

- Karen Ward
  - Heat – 8:45.37
  - Final – 8:48.12 (→ 8th place)
- Donna McGinnis
  - Heat – 8:51.71 (→ did not advance, 10th place)

Women's 4 × 100 m freestyle Relay

- Jane Kerr, Maureen New, Cheryl McArton, and Carol Klimpel
  - Heat – 3:50.40
- Pamela Rai, Carol Klimpel, Cheryl McArton, and Jane Kerr
  - Final – 3:49.50 (→ 5th place)

Women's 4 × 100 m Medley Relay

- Reema Abdo, Anne Ottenbrite, Michelle MacPherson, and Pamela Rai
  - Heat – 4:15.70
  - Final – 4:12.98 (→ Bronze medal)

Women's 100m Backstroke

- Reema Abdo
  - Heat – 1:04.92
  - B-Final – 1:05.13 (→ 14th place)
- Michelle MacPherson
  - Heat – 1:06.04 (→ did not advance, 19th place)

Women's 200m Backstroke

- Reema Abdo
  - Heat – 2:19.05
  - B-Final – 2:18.50 (→ 12th place)
- Melinda Copp
  - Heat – 2:21.39 (→ did not advance, 19th place)

Women's 200m Butterfly

- Jill Horstead
  - Heat – 2:14.88
  - B-Final – 2:13.49 (→ 9th place)
- Marie Moore
  - Heat – 2:14.95
  - B-Final – 2:14.96 (→ 11th place)

Women's 200m Individual Medley

- Michelle MacPherson
  - Heat – 2:20.68
  - B-Final – 2:19.34 (→ 10th place)
- Alison Dozzo
  - Heat – 2:20.85
  - B-Final – 2:19.70 (→ 11th place)

Women's 400m Individual Medley

- Nathalie Gingras
  - Heat – 4:51.77
  - Final – 4:50.55 (→ 5th place)
- Donna McGinnis
  - Heat – 4:53.30
  - Final – 4:50.65 (→ 6th place)

== Volleyball ==
Men's team competition

- Preliminary round (group B)
  - Lost to Italy (1-3)
  - Defeated Egypt (3-0)
  - Defeated China (3-0)
  - Defeated Japan (3-0)
- Semi-finals
  - Lost to United States (0-3)
- Bronze Medal Match
  - Lost to Italy (0-3) → 4th place
- Team roster
  - Rick Bacon
  - John Barrett
  - Allan Coulter
  - Terry Danyluk
  - Paul Gratton
  - Glenn Hoag
  - Tom Jones
  - Dave Jones
  - Alex Ketrzynski
  - Garth Pischke
  - Don Saxton
  - Randy Wagner

Women's team competition

- Preliminary round (group A)
  - Lost to Peru (0-3)
  - Lost to South Korea (0-3)
  - Lost to Japan (0-3)
- Classification matches
  - 5th/8th place: lost to West Germany (0-3)
  - 7th/8th place: lost to Brazil (0-3) → 8th place
- Team roster
  - Diane Ratnik
  - Suzi Smith
  - Tracey Mills
  - Joyce Gamborg
  - Audrey Vandervelden
  - Monica Hitchcock
  - Karen Fraser
  - Rachel Beliveau
  - Lise Martin
  - Caroline Cote
  - Barbara Broen
  - Josee Lebel

== Water polo ==
Men's team competition

- Preliminary round (group A)
  - Lost to Yugoslavia (4-13)
  - Lost to Netherlands (9-10)
  - Lost to China (5-6)
- Final Round (Group E)
  - Lost to Greece (8-11)
  - Drew with Brazil (10-10)
  - Defeated Japan (8-5)
  - Lost to Italy (9-16) → 10th place
- Team roster
  - Rick Zayonc
  - Alexander Juhasz
  - George Gross
  - Sylvain Huet
  - John Anderson
  - Paul Pottier
  - Simon De-Schamps
  - Brian Collyer
  - Bill Meyer
  - Rene Bol
  - Gordon Vantol
  - Geoff Brown
  - Dominique Dion
