= Water polo at the 1984 Summer Olympics – Men's team squads =

The following are complete rosters for the twelve men's water polo teams that competed in the 1984 Summer Olympics water polo tournament played in August 1984. Each team registered 13 players which are ordered by their respective team numbers. Players marked with † were unused throughout the tournament. Names of coaches are taken from the official Olympics report. Player ages are correct as of 1 August 1984, the starting day of the tournament.

== Group A ==
=== Canada ===
The following players represented Canada:

Head coach: (Canada) Gabor Csepregi

No.	Name	Pld	Gls	Height	Weight	Date of birth	1984 club
1	Rick Zayonc	7	0	1.86 m (6 ft 1 in)	86 kg (190 lb)	18 November 1959 (aged 24)	
2	Alexander Juhasz						
3	George Gross						
4	Sylvain Huet						
5	John Anderson						
6	Paul Pottier						
7	Simon Deschamps						
8	Brian Collyer						
9	Bill Meyer						
10	René Bol						
11	Gordon Van Tol						
12	Geoff Brown						
13	Dominique Dion						

=== China ===
The following players represented China:

Head coach: Pens

No.	Name	Pld	Gls	Height	Weight	Date of birth	1984 club
1	Deng Jun	7	0	1.80 m (5 ft 11 in)	74 kg (163 lb)	28 November 1956 (aged 27)	
2	Wang Xiaotian	7	15				
3	Song Weigang	7	1				
4	Li Jianming	7	5				
5	Huang Ying	7	8				
6	Cai Tianxiong	7	1				
7	Qu Baowei	7	5				
8	Zhao Bilong	7	7				
9	Chen Zhixiong	7	0				
10	Cai Shengliu	7	5				
11	Pan Shenghua	7	1				
12	Huang Long	7	11				
13	Guan Shishi †	0	0				

=== Netherlands ===
The following players represented the Netherlands:

Head coach: (Hungary) Dénes Pócsik

No.	Name	Pld	Gls	Height	Weight	Date of birth	1984 club
1	Wouly de Bie			2.00 m (6 ft 7 in)	100 kg (220 lb)	4 March 1958 (aged 26)	(Netherlands) De Robben
2	Nico Landeweerd						
3	Eric Noordegraaf						
4	Ed van Es						
5	Ton Buunk						
6	Dick Nieuwenhuizen						
7	Stan van Belkum						
8	Aad van Mil						
9	Johan Aantjes						
10	Anton Heiden						
11	Remco Pielstroom						
12	Roald van Noort						
13	Ruud Misdorp						

=== Yugoslavia ===
The following players represented Yugoslavia:

Head coach: (Socialist Federal Republic of Yugoslavia) Ratko Rudić

No.	Name	Pld	Gls	Height	Weight	Date of birth	1984 club
1	Milorad Krivokapić	7	0	1.87 m (6 ft 2 in)	85 kg (187 lb)	8 January 1956 (aged 28)	(Socialist Federal Republic of Yugoslavia) Primorac
2	Deni Lušić	7	7	1.90 m (6 ft 3 in)	95 kg (209 lb)	14 April 1962 (aged 22)	(Socialist Federal Republic of Yugoslavia) POŠK
3	Zoran Petrović	7	0	2.03 m (6 ft 8 in)	98 kg (216 lb)	22 August 1960 (aged 23)	(Socialist Federal Republic of Yugoslavia) Partizan
4	Božo Vuletić	7	5	1.86 m (6 ft 1 in)	90 kg (198 lb)	1 July 1958 (aged 26)	(Socialist Federal Republic of Yugoslavia) Jug
5	Veselin Đuho	7	8	1.87 m (6 ft 2 in)	95 kg (209 lb)	5 January 1960 (aged 24)	(Socialist Federal Republic of Yugoslavia) Jug
6	Zoran Roje	7	7	1.93 m (6 ft 4 in)	93 kg (205 lb)	7 October 1956 (aged 27)	(Socialist Federal Republic of Yugoslavia) Primorje
7	Milivoj Bebić	7	16	1.88 m (6 ft 2 in)	88 kg (194 lb)	29 August 1959 (aged 24)	(Socialist Federal Republic of Yugoslavia) Jug
8	Perica Bukić	7	0	1.98 m (6 ft 6 in)	85 kg (187 lb)	20 February 1966 (aged 18)	(Socialist Federal Republic of Yugoslavia) Solaris
9	Goran Sukno	7	6	1.88 m (6 ft 2 in)	86 kg (190 lb)	6 April 1959 (aged 25)	(Socialist Federal Republic of Yugoslavia) Jug
10	Tomislav Paškvalin	7	11	2.04 m (6 ft 8 in)	105 kg (231 lb)	29 August 1961 (aged 22)	(Socialist Federal Republic of Yugoslavia) Mladost
11	Igor Milanović	7	6	1.95 m (6 ft 5 in)	97 kg (214 lb)	18 December 1965 (aged 18)	(Socialist Federal Republic of Yugoslavia) Partizan
12	Dragan Andrić	7	6	1.92 m (6 ft 4 in)	91 kg (201 lb)	6 June 1962 (aged 22)	(Socialist Federal Republic of Yugoslavia) Partizan
13	Andrija Popović	1	0	1.93 m (6 ft 4 in)	86 kg (190 lb)	22 September 1959 (aged 24)	(Socialist Federal Republic of Yugoslavia) Primorac

== Group B ==
=== Brazil ===
The following players represented Brazil:

Head coach: Carvalho

No.	Name	Pld	Gls	Height	Weight	Date of birth	1984 club
1	Roberto Borelli						
2	Orlando Chaves						
3	Paulo Abreu						
4	Carlos Carvalho						
5	Sílvio Manfredi						
6	Solon dos Santos						
7	Ricardo Tonieto						
8	Eric Borges						
9	Mario Souto						
10	Mario Sérgio Lotufo						
11	Fernando Carsalade						
12	Hélio Silva						
13	André Campos						

=== Greece ===
The following players represented Greece:

Head coach: Josep Brasco Cata

No.	Name	Pld	Gls	Height	Weight	Date of birth	1984 club
1	Ioannis Vossos			1.92 m (6 ft 4 in)	82 kg (181 lb)	10 October 1960	(Greece) Vouliagmeni
2	Spyros Capralos					15 April 1955	(Greece) Olympiacos
3	Sotirios Stathakis					15 April 1953	(Greece) Ethnikos Piraeus
4	Andreas Gounas					26 August 1957	(Greece) Olympiacos
5	Kyriakos Giannopoulos					17 April 1959	(Greece) ANO Glyfada
6	Aristidis Kefalogiannis					14 March 1960	(Greece) Panathinaikos
7	Anastasios Papanastasiou					12 July 1964	(Greece) ANO Glyfada
8	Dimitrios Seletopoulos					28 May 1963	(Greece) Panathinaikos
9	Antonios Aronis					17 March 1957	(Greece) Ethnikos Piraeus
10	Markellos Sitarenios					14 May 1956	(Greece) Ethnikos Piraeus
11	George Mavrotas					4 April 1967	(Greece) Vouliagmeni
12	Xenofon Moudatsios					28 March 1960	(Greece) Panathinaikos
13	Stavros Giannopoulos					12 July 1961	(Greece) ANO Glyfada

=== Spain ===
The following players represented Spain:

Head coach: Pujol

No.	Name	Pld	Gls	Height	Weight	Date of birth	1984 club
1	Leandro Ribera Perpiñá			1.94 m (6 ft 4 in)	87 kg (192 lb)	2 August 1962	(Spain) Barcelona
2	José Morillo						
3	Félix Fernández						
4	Alberto Canal						
5	Manuel Estiarte						
6	Pedro Robert						
7	Rafael Aguilar						
8	Jorge Signes						
9	Antonio Aguilar						
10	Jorge Carmona						
11	Jordi Sans						
12	Jorge Neira						
13	Mariano Moya						

=== United States ===
The following players represented the United States:

Head coach: (United States) Monte Nitzkowski

No.	Name	Pld	Gls	Height	Weight	Date of birth	1984 club
1	Craig Wilson	7	0	1.95 m (6 ft 5 in)	86 kg (190 lb)	5 February 1957	
2	Kevin Robertson	7	13	1.75 m (5 ft 9 in)	75 kg (165 lb)	2 February 1959	(United States) California Golden Bears
3	Gary Figueroa	7	8	1.83 m (6 ft 0 in)	77 kg (170 lb)	28 September 1956	(United States) Newport Water Polo Foundation
4	Peter Campbell	7	4	1.93 m (6 ft 4 in)	89 kg (196 lb)	21 May 1960	
5	Doug Burke	7	3	1.83 m (6 ft 0 in)	82 kg (181 lb)	30 March 1957	
6	Joseph Vargas	7	5	1.90 m (6 ft 3 in)	89 kg (196 lb)	4 October 1955	(United States) Newport Water Polo Foundation
7	Jon Svendsen	7	1	1.90 m (6 ft 3 in)	93 kg (205 lb)	26 October 1953	(United States) Concord Aquatic Club
8	John Siman	7	3	1.98 m (6 ft 6 in)	91 kg (201 lb)	7 October 1952	
9	Andrew McDonald	7	4	1.95 m (6 ft 5 in)	91 kg (201 lb)	19 October 1955	
10	Terry Schroeder	7	13	1.90 m (6 ft 3 in)	95 kg (209 lb)	9 October 1958	
11	Jody Campbell	7	10	1.90 m (6 ft 3 in)	89 kg (196 lb)	4 March 1960	
12	Timothy Shaw	7	1	1.88 m (6 ft 2 in)	89 kg (196 lb)	8 November 1957	(United States) Cal State Long Beach
13	Christopher Dorst	1	0	1.93 m (6 ft 4 in)	86 kg (190 lb)	5 June 1956	

== Group C ==
=== Australia ===
The following players represented Australia:

Head coach: (Australia) Tom Hoad

No.	Name	Pld	Gls	Height	Weight	Date of birth	1984 club
1	Michael Turner			1.88 m (6 ft 2 in)	80 kg (176 lb)	5 January 1951 (aged 33)	(Australia) Cronulla Sutherland Water Polo Club
2	Richard Pengelley						
3	Robert Bryant						
4	Peter Montgomery						
5	Russell Sherwell						
6	Andrew Kerr						
7	Raymond Mayers						
8	Charles Turner						
9	Martin Callaghan						
10	Christopher Wybrow						
11	Russell Basser						
12	Julian Muspratt						
13	Glenn Townsend						

=== Italy ===
The following players represented Italy:

Head coach: (Italy) Fritz Dennerlein

No.	Name	Pld	Gls	Height	Weight	Date of birth	1984 club
1	Roberto Gandolfi	7	0	1.87 m (6 ft 2 in)	78 kg (172 lb)	14 July 1956 (aged 28)	(Italy) Bogliasco
2	Alfio Misaggi	7	5	1.85 m (6 ft 1 in)	85 kg (187 lb)	7 February 1959 (aged 25)	
3	Andrea Pisano	7	2	1.86 m (6 ft 1 in)	90 kg (198 lb)	5 May 1961 (aged 23)	(Italy) Savona
4	Antonello Steardo	7	7	1.90 m (6 ft 3 in)	90 kg (198 lb)	27 August 1958 (aged 25)	
5	Mario Fiorillo	7	19	1.79 m (5 ft 10 in)	70 kg (154 lb)	16 December 1962 (aged 21)	
6	Gianni De Magistris	7	11	1.85 m (6 ft 1 in)	82 kg (181 lb)	3 December 1950 (aged 33)	(Italy) Florentia
7	Marco Galli	7	6				(Italy) Pro Recco
8	Marco D'Altrui	7	5				(Italy) Pro Recco
9	Marco Baldineti	7	8				(Italy) Pro Recco
10	Vincenzo D'Angelo	7	6				(Italy) Napoli
11	Romeo Collina	7	1				(Italy) Bogliasco
12	Stefano Postiglione	7	5				(Italy) Posillipo
13	Umberto Panerai †	0	0				(Italy) Florentia

=== Japan ===
The following players represented Japan:

Head coach: Kiyohara

No.	Name	Pld	Gls	Height	Weight	Date of birth	1984 club
1	Etsuji Fujita			1.76 m (5 ft 9 in)	69 kg (152 lb)	12 July 1961 (aged 23)	
2	Yoshifumi Saito						
3	Koshi Fujimori						
4	Shingo Kai						
5	Narihito Taima						
6	Daisuke Houki						
7	Toshio Fukumoto						
8	Toshiyuki Miyahara						
9	Hisayoshi Nagata						
10	Koji Wakayoshi						
11	Hisaharu Saito						
12	Shinji Yamasaki						
13	Asami Oura						

=== West Germany ===
The following players represented West Germany:

Head coach: (Romania) Nico Firoiu

No.	Name	Pld	Gls	Height	Weight	Date of birth	1984 club
1	Peter Röhle	7	0	1.93 m (6 ft 4 in)	90 kg (198 lb)	6 March 1957 (aged 27)	(West Germany) Wasserfreunde Spandau 04
2	Thomas Loebb	7	12	1.97 m (6 ft 6 in)	91 kg (201 lb)	11 July 1957 (aged 27)	(West Germany) Wasserfreunde Spandau 04
3	Frank Otto	7	18	1.93 m (6 ft 4 in)	94 kg (207 lb)	10 February 1959 (aged 25)	(West Germany) SV Cannstatt
4	Rainer Hoppe	7	2	1.91 m (6 ft 3 in)	95 kg (209 lb)	26 January 1962 (aged 22)	(West Germany) DSV 98
5	Armando Fernández	7	6	1.75 m (5 ft 9 in)	73 kg (161 lb)	11 May 1955 (aged 29)	(West Germany) Wasserfreunde Spandau 04
6	Thomas Huber	7	0	1.90 m (6 ft 3 in)	90 kg (198 lb)	4 November 1963 (aged 20)	(West Germany) ASC Duisburg
7	Jürgen Schröder	7	1	1.81 m (5 ft 11 in)	78 kg (172 lb)	16 December 1960 (aged 23)	(West Germany) Rote Erde
8	Rainer Osselmann	7	6	1.86 m (6 ft 1 in)	88 kg (194 lb)	25 July 1960 (aged 24)	(West Germany) ASC Duisburg
9	Hagen Stamm	7	15	1.91 m (6 ft 3 in)	100 kg (220 lb)	12 June 1960 (aged 24)	(West Germany) Wasserfreunde Spandau 04
10	Roland Freund	7	6	1.81 m (5 ft 11 in)	86 kg (190 lb)	17 June 1955 (aged 29)	(West Germany) Aegir Uerdingen
11	Dirk Theismann	7	3	1.83 m (6 ft 0 in)	95 kg (209 lb)	8 June 1963 (aged 21)	(West Germany) Wasserfreunde Spandau 04
12	Santiago Chalmovsky †	0	0			25 June 1959 (aged 25)	(Germany) Duisburger SV 98
13	Werner Obschernikat	7	5	1.80 m (5 ft 11 in)	78 kg (172 lb)	9 July 1955 (aged 29)	(West Germany) DSV 98
