= 2010 in Canada =

- Decades: 1990s; 2000s; 2010s; 2020s
- See also: History of Canada; Timeline of Canadian history; List of years in Canada

Events from the year 2010 in Canada.

== Incumbents ==
=== Crown ===
- Monarch – Elizabeth II

=== Federal government ===
- Governor General – Michaëlle Jean (until October 1) then David Johnston
- Prime Minister – Stephen Harper
- Chief Justice – Beverley McLachlin (British Columbia)
- Parliament – 40th

=== Provincial governments ===
==== Lieutenant governors ====
- Lieutenant Governor of Alberta – Norman Kwong (until May 11) then Donald Ethell
- Lieutenant Governor of British Columbia – Steven Point
- Lieutenant Governor of Manitoba – Philip S. Lee
- Lieutenant Governor of New Brunswick – Graydon Nicholas
- Lieutenant Governor of Newfoundland and Labrador – John Crosbie
- Lieutenant Governor of Nova Scotia – Mayann Francis
- Lieutenant Governor of Ontario – David Onley
- Lieutenant Governor of Prince Edward Island – Barbara Oliver Hagerman
- Lieutenant Governor of Quebec – Pierre Duchesne
- Lieutenant Governor of Saskatchewan – Gordon Barnhart

==== Premiers ====
- Premier of Alberta – Ed Stelmach
- Premier of British Columbia – Gordon Campbell
- Premier of Manitoba – Greg Selinger
- Premier of New Brunswick – Shawn Graham (until October 12) then David Alward
- Premier of Newfoundland and Labrador – Danny Williams (until December 3) then Kathy Dunderdale
- Premier of Nova Scotia – Darrell Dexter
- Premier of Ontario – Dalton McGuinty
- Premier of Prince Edward Island – Robert Ghiz
- Premier of Quebec – Jean Charest
- Premier of Saskatchewan – Brad Wall

=== Territorial governments ===
==== Commissioners ====
- Commissioner of Yukon – Geraldine Van Bibber (until December 17) then Doug Phillips
- Commissioner of Northwest Territories – Tony Whitford (until May 28) then George Tuccaro
- Commissioner of Nunavut – Ann Meekitjuk Hanson (until April 10) then Nellie Kusugak (acting) (April 10 to May 31) then Edna Elias

==== Premiers ====
- Premier of the Northwest Territories – Floyd Roland
- Premier of Nunavut – Eva Aariak
- Premier of Yukon – Dennis Fentie

== Events ==
=== January ===
- January 1 – The Ontario government files a lawsuit (alongside some American states) in an American court to stop the dumping of Asian carp into the Great Lakes, a fish that could damage the fishing industry.
- January 13 – The Government of Canada sent DART to Haiti to help with the aftermath of the earthquake.
- January 14 – The Government of Canada sent two Canadian Forces Maritime Command ships (Athabaskan and Halifax) with emergency supplies and aid for further assistance in Haiti. (See: Canada's response to the earthquake and Operation Hestia)
- January 25
  - Foreign ministers from around the world meet in Montreal to attend the Ministerial Preparatory Conference of the Group of Friends of Haiti event to discuss how to help Haiti rebuild after the devastating earthquake.
  - Fisheries and Oceans Minister Gail Shea is pied in her face at the Canada Centre for Inland Waters, west of Toronto, by PETA member Emily McCoy, 37, of New York City, United States.
  - Newfoundland and Labrador residents witness an unidentified flying object in the sky.

=== February ===
- February 1 – Two young boys, Jayden and Connor McConnell are found drowned in a bathtub in Alberta, Canada. Their mother, Allyson McConnell, later admits to drowning the pair, with the killings believed to be revenge against her husband for ending their marriage.
- February 5 – New Democratic Party Leader Jack Layton announces that he has prostate cancer.
- February 7 – The building which houses the CTV Ottawa newsroom is destroyed by an early morning fire.
- February 8 – CFB Trenton Commander Colonel Russell Williams is charged with two counts of murder against two women and two counts of sexual assault of another two women.
- February 11 – Prime Minister Stephen Harper addresses the Legislative Assembly of British Columbia, before the Olympics opening ceremony. Provincial Liberals approve while federal Liberals disapprove.
- February 12
  - 2010 Olympics: An anti-Olympics protest disrupts the Torch relay route.
  - 2010 Olympics: Georgian luger Nodar Kumaritashvili was killed during training at the Whistler Sliding Centre.
- February 14 – 2010 Olympics: Canadian Alexandre Bilodeau won the first ever Olympic gold medal won by a Canadian on Canadian soil.
- February 15 – Canada closes its ports to fishing boats from the Danish territories of Greenland and Faroe Islands, as a result of their refusal to accept international shrimp quotas.
- February 18 – John Babcock, the country's last surviving World War I veteran, dies at the age of 109.
- February 20 – The Council of the Federation met with their American counterpart, the National Governors Association, in a Washington, D.C. hotel, for an hour-long session entitled "Common Border, Common Ground" to talk about issues such as environment and trade.
- February 22 – 2010 Olympics: Tessa Virtue & Scott Moir became the first North American couple to win the ice dancing gold.
- February 26 – A winter storm knocks out hydro across Ontario, Quebec and the Maritimes.
- February 28
  - Sidney Crosby scores in overtime against the United States to secure gold for Canada as Canada wins its 14th gold in the 2010 Winter Olympics, making it the most gold ever won by one country.
  - The closing ceremonies are held in BC Place.

=== March ===
- March 6–13 – The 2010 Arctic Winter Games were held in Grande Prairie, Alberta.
- March 10 – Environment Canada reports that the winter of 2009–2010 was the warmest and driest on record in Canada, an average of 4 °C warmer than normal nationwide.
- March 12
  - The opening ceremony for the 2010 Winter Paralympics is held in Vancouver.
  - Three women are shot, two die at a home in Mountain View, Ontario.
  - Three men are shot by a former employee at a car dealership in Edmonton. Two of the men die at the scene.
- March 13 – Two people die, and thirty others are injured during an avalanche at a snowmobile event near Revelstoke, British Columbia.
- March 17 – The territory of Nunavut bans importation of alcohol from Europe, in retaliation for the European Union ban on seal products.
- March 19 – An avalanche kills a woman snowmobiler on Eagle Pass Mountain.
- March 20
  - Two skiers die during an avalanche near Wells Gray Provincial Park. This is the third deadly avalanche to happen in British Columbia within a week.
  - Victoria Police Department are caught using excessive force.
- March 24 – New Brunswick Premier Shawn Graham announces the proposed sale of NB Power falls through, citing Hydro-Québec's "concerns over unanticipated costs".

=== April ===
- April 18 – The 2010 Juno Awards were held in St. John's.
- April 21 – Governor General Michaëlle Jean issued an apology to Rwanda for Canada's "inaction" during the Rwandan genocide in 1994.
- April 23
  - Thousands attended an Olympic parade in Montreal, which featured the nations winners from the 2010 Winter Olympics.
  - A man dies in hospital after being crushed at a Tim Hortons drive-thru in Wallaceburg.
- April 24 – Princess Anne arrives in St. John's for a two-day tour of the city.
- April 25 – A mine collapses on three workers killing one in central Yukon.
- April 29
  - Canada offers Michigan a $550 million loan to help build a new bridge between Detroit and Windsor.
  - A snowstorm hits Alberta, dropping 20 centimetres of snow and causing power outages.
- April 30 – A publication ban is put into place during the Victoria Stafford trial.

=== May ===
- May 4 – Three people die after their truck collides with a train at a crossing in Edmonton.
- May 10 – A landslide in Saint-Jude, Quebec, sweeps a house killing four people.
- May 11 – Donald Ethell becomes lieutenant governor of Alberta, replacing Norman Kwong.
- May 13 – 41 people are arrested in Montreal after a violent night following the Montreal Canadiens victory over the Pittsburgh Penguins in the Stanley Cup eastern conference semi-final.
- May 25 – A plane crashes into a building in Markham, a town just north of Toronto, killing two people.
- May 25 - A nine-hole score of 25 (11 under par) was scored during the Alberta Open. The feat happened on the back nine of the Carnmoney Golf Club - southeast of Calgary.
- May 27 – A forest fire forces thirteen hundred people away from their homes in Wemotaci.
- May 29 – A floatplane crashes of the coast of Vancouver Island killing four people.
- May 30 – A state of emergency is called in Emerson after multiple storms.

=== June ===
- June 6 – A state of emergency is called in Leamington after a tornado causes severe damage.
- June 11 – Charles Kembo is found guilty of four first degree murders in Vancouver after a nine-month trial.
- June 13 – A landslide in Oliver destroys homes and blocks off sections of Highway 97.
- June 18 – Floods in southeastern Alberta cause severe damage and force people to evacuate.
- June 21 – A house in northeast Edmonton explodes killing four people, and damaging surrounding homes. Police ruled the incident as a domestic related murder/suicide.
- June 23
  - A plane crashes after taking off from the Jean Lasage International Airport in Quebec City. Seven people die, including two crew members.
  - A 5.0 magnitude earthquake occurs in Ontario and Quebec. Buildings in Toronto and Ottawa are evacuated.
  - A tornado strikes in Midland causing severe damage.
- June 25–27 – The 36th G8 summit is held in Huntsville, Ontario, Canada. Consecutively, the 4th G20 summit is also held in Toronto, Ontario, Canada on the same dates.
- June 26–27 – Nearly 1,000 people are arrested in Toronto after protests against the G20 summit lead to several police cars being set on fire, and police boxed in crowds at one intersection where this took place the next day, leading to mass arrests for breach of the peace.
- June 28 – Her Majesty Queen Elizabeth II and Prince Philip arrive in Halifax starting a nine-day tour of Canada.

=== July ===
- July 1 – A severe thunderstorm causes major flooding in and around Yorkton, Saskatchewan
- July 2 – An F3 tornado rips apart the Kawacatoose First Nation north of Raymore, Saskatchewan.
- July 5 – An explosion at a transformer station causes ten thousand customers to lose power in Toronto.
- July 8
  - A parking garage in Windsor collapses sending one man to the hospital.
  - David Lloyd Johnston is named the next Governor General of Canada. He will assume office on October 1.
- July 13 – Up to 18 cm (7.1 in) of snow falls in mountainous regions of Alberta.
- July 16
  - Four people die and two people are critically injured when a float plane crashes near Maria-Chapdelaine.
  - A ride at the Calgary Stampede malfunctions injuring five people.
- July 17 – Parks Canada had a no-entry fee day for all parks, national historic sites and National Marine Conservation Areas, to celebrate the 125th anniversary of Canada's national parks system.
- July 22 – A riot breaks out at a detention centre in Quebec City leaving two people dead.
- July 26 – A pipeline owned by Enbridge that was carrying oil to Sarnia leaks three million litres of oil into a creek in Michigan.
- July 28 – Todd Hardy, MLA for Whitehorse Centre (1996–2000), (2002–2010) and the former leader of the Yukon New Democratic Party from 2002 to 2009, dies in office.
- July 29 – The Department of National Defence reveals that edits made on Wikipedia pages relating to the Joint Strike Fighter jet and the Conservative government's decision to spend as much as $18 billion on the aircraft, were traced back to the Defence Research and Development Canada.
- July 30 – Wildfires in the Cariboo region force evacuations and cause state of emergencies to be called.

=== August ===
- August 1 – Six people are killed after their minivan crashes head-on with an RV near Golden, British Columbia.
- August 3 – Bernard Callebault, a well known Calgary chocolate company, goes into receivership.
- August 10 – The BC Federation of Labour starts an investigation into a work camp near Golden, British Columbia, where 24 workers were subject to significant abuse, food deprivation, and poor sleeping quarters.
- August 11 – The town of Oka buys the land from Norfolk Financial that caused the Oka Crisis 20 years earlier.
- August 12 – A Thai ship, the MV Sun Sea carrying Tamil refugees from Sri Lanka, is intercepted by HMCS Winnipeg, off the coast of British Columbia.
- August 14 – approximately 9:15 p.m. ET: The Royal Canadian Mounted Police arrest a man outside of 24 Sussex Drive, after he was found igniting a small quantity of flammable liquid, starting a small fire. He was turned over to Ottawa Police.
- August 17 – Four men die when their helicopter crashes near Sept-Îles.
- August 20 – The NDM-1 super bug is found at Brampton, Ontario's William Osler Health Centre.
- August 22 – A bus crash near Woodstock kills one person and injuries twelve others.
- August 25 – Three men are arrested in Ottawa after being accused of taking part in a domestic terrorist plot.
- August 31 – John Rowswell, Mayor of Sault Ste. Marie, Ontario, dies in office.

=== September ===
- September 4 – Hurricane Earl kills one person and causes damage in the Maritimes.
- September 12 – A technical error in an Enmax transformer installation caused a power surge that fried the electrical system at Mayfair Place, an apartment block in Calgary. 300 people were out of their homes for upwards of ten days. Damages reached in the millions of dollars.
- September 15 – Seven tonnes of hashish is seized from an abandoned trailer by the Royal Canadian Mounted Police in Montreal.
- September 20
  - The first Canadian 3D documentary airs on CBC Television. The film documented Queen Elizabeth II various visits as Monarch of Canada, as well, 3D footage of the 1953 Coronation was aired. In preparation for the event, 2 million 3D glasses were handed out at various Canada Post outlets.
  - Karkwa's album Les Chemins de verre wins the 2010 Polaris Music Prize.
- September 21 – Hurricane Igor moves across Newfoundland causing damage and sweeping a man into the ocean after his driveway is washed away.
- September 22 – MPs in the House of Commons vote 153–151 to save the Canadian Firearms Registry from being scrapped.
- September 24 – A fire on the 24th floor of a 30-floor Toronto apartment building, at 200 Wellesley Street East, leaves approximately 1,200 people homeless and 14 injured.
- September 27 – The 2010 New Brunswick general election is won by David Alward's Conservative Party.
- September 28 – Superior Court of Ontario Justice Susan Himel declares the Criminal Code's prohibition of streetwalking and brothels as unconstitutional, after a challenge by a Toronto dominatrix and two other prostitutes, in Bedford v. Canada.

=== October ===
- October 1
  - David Lloyd Johnston is sworn in as the 28th Governor General of Canada.
  - Torrential rain causes flooding in Sherbrooke killing one person.
- October 2 – Olive Crane is chosen as the new leader of the Progressive Conservative Party of Prince Edward Island.
- October 3 – Dianne Whalen, MHA for Conception Bay East and Bell Island (2003–2010), dies in office.
- October 13 – Health Canada added Bisphenol A to Schedule 1 of the Canadian Environmental Protection Act, declaring it as a toxic substance.
- October 15 – A Nor'easter moves through Atlantic Canada causing power outages and canceling ferry services.
- October 18
  - The 2010 Alberta municipal elections take place. The Calgary election is won by Naheed Nenshi, the first Muslim to be elected mayor of a major Canadian city.
  - The home of a gay couple in Little Pond, Prince Edward Island, is firebombed. Both men escaped the fire unharmed, but their home was destroyed. In late October and November, a series of rallies and fundraising concerts is held in both Little Pond and Charlottetown to support the couple and to oppose homophobic violence.
- October 19 – The Quebec government passes through Bill 115 which sets out who qualifies to attend English public school in the province, after more than 20 hours of an emergency debate.
- October 21 – David Russell Williams is sentenced to two terms of life in prison for the murders of two women, also for other charges including sexual assault.
- October 25 – The 2010 Ontario municipal elections take place.
- October 27 – The 2010 Manitoba municipal elections take place.
- October 26–28 – A severe storm affects most of Canada from Saskatchewan through to Quebec. Heavy snows and school closures were reported in eastern Saskatchewan and western Manitoba while eastern Manitoba and Ontario eastward suffered rain. Winds were strong throughout the entire region, whipping up large waves on the Manitoba lakes and causing flooding along the shores of Lake Winnipeg and Lake Manitoba.

=== November ===
- November 3
  - Premier Gordon Campbell announces at a conference in Vancouver that he is stepping down as Premier of British Columbia.
  - The federal government rejects BHP's $40 billion takeover bid for the PotashCorp.
- November 4 – Environment minister Jim Prentice announced his retirement from politics, to become a vice chairman of CIBC, in January 2011.
- November 8–10 – Floods in Southwestern Nova Scotia cause millions of dollars in damage and prompts a state of emergency to be called.
- November 13 – A single-engine plane crashes near Barrie killing two men.
- November 15 – Elaine Campione is convicted of the murders her two daughters in Barrie, Ontario, having drowned them in a bathtub in order to stop her ex-husband gaining custody of the children. Campione is later sentenced to life imprisonment for her crimes.
- November 18 – The premiers of Newfoundland and Labrador and Nova Scotia announce a $6.2 billion deal to develop the Lower Churchill hydroelectric megaproject.
- November 25 – Danny Williams announces he is leaving politics, the second premier to do so that month.
- November 29 – Three federal by-elections. The Conservatives won Dauphin—Swan River—Marquette (Manitoba) and Vaughan (Ontario), and the Liberals won in Winnipeg North (Manitoba).
- November 30 – Doug Phillips becomes commissioner of Yukon, replacing Geraldine Van Bibber.

=== December ===
- December 3: Kathy Dunderdale becomes premier of Newfoundland and Labrador, replacing Danny Williams, the first woman to do so.
- December 4–8: A series of snowstorms and snow squalls dump over 110 centimeters of snow to parts of southern Ontario. The city of London was the hardest hit.
- December 6: A winter storm hits Atlantic Canada, bringing heavy snow, flooding rains and forcing school closures.
- December 13: A state of emergency is called, for Lambton County, Ontario, as a snowstorm causes numerous Ontario provincial highways to be closed and more than 300 motorists were stuck on Ontario Highway 402. One man who wandered away from his vehicle died from exposure.
- December 13–15: Flooding, especially along the Saint John River in New Brunswick washes out roads and forces evacuations.
- December 16: Bill C-464, (or Zachary's Bill) is passed, allowing courts to refuse bail to those serious crimes to protect children. The legislation was sparked by the murder of Zachary Turner by his mother, and its introduction inspired by the documentary film Dear Zachary
- December 20: Gravonaut, a scrolling platform game is released.
- December 20–22: A storm brings flooding storm surge coinciding with high tide and heavy snow to the Atlantic provinces, causing millions of dollars in damage.
- December 27: A nor'easter begins dumping snow and rain in Atlantic Canada after bringing snow and strong winds from Florida to Maine.

=== Undated ===
- The Wedding Belles, Canadian lifestyle television series is launched.

== Arts and literature ==
=== Literature ===
- November 9 – Johanna Skibsrud wins the Scotiabank Giller Prize for her novel The Sentimentalists.
- November 16 – The winners of the 2010 Governor General's Awards are announced.

== Sport ==
- January 6–10 – The 2010 Newfoundland and Labrador Scotties Tournament of Hearts was held in St. John's.
- February 12–28 – 2010 Vancouver Winter Olympics
- March 12–21 – 2010 Winter Paralympics
- May 23 – The Windsor Spitfires win their second (consecutive) Memorial Cup by defeating Brandon Wheat Kings 9 to 1. The tournament was played at Westman Place in Brandon, Manitoba
- June 9 – Winnipegs Jonathan Toews of the Chicago Blackhawks is awarded the Conn Smythe Trophy for bring his team its First Stanley Cup since 1961
- June 11–13 – 2010 Canadian Grand Prix – won by Lewis Hamilton
- July 16–18 – 2010 Honda Indy Toronto – won by Will Power
- July 25 – 2010 Honda Indy Edmonton – won by Scott Dixon
- November 27 – The Laval Rouge et Or win their seventh Vanier Cup by defeating the Calgary Dinos 29 to 2 in the 46th Vanier Cup played at PEPS Stadium in Quebec City
- November 28 – The Montreal Alouettes win their seventh Grey Cup by defeating the Saskatchewan Roughriders in the 98th Grey Cup played at Commonwealth Stadium in Edmonton

== Births ==
- January 22 – Joseph Maraachli, Leigh's disease infant (died 2011)
- October 23 – Eddy and Nelson Angélil, twin sons of Celine Dion and of René Angélil

== Deaths ==
=== January ===
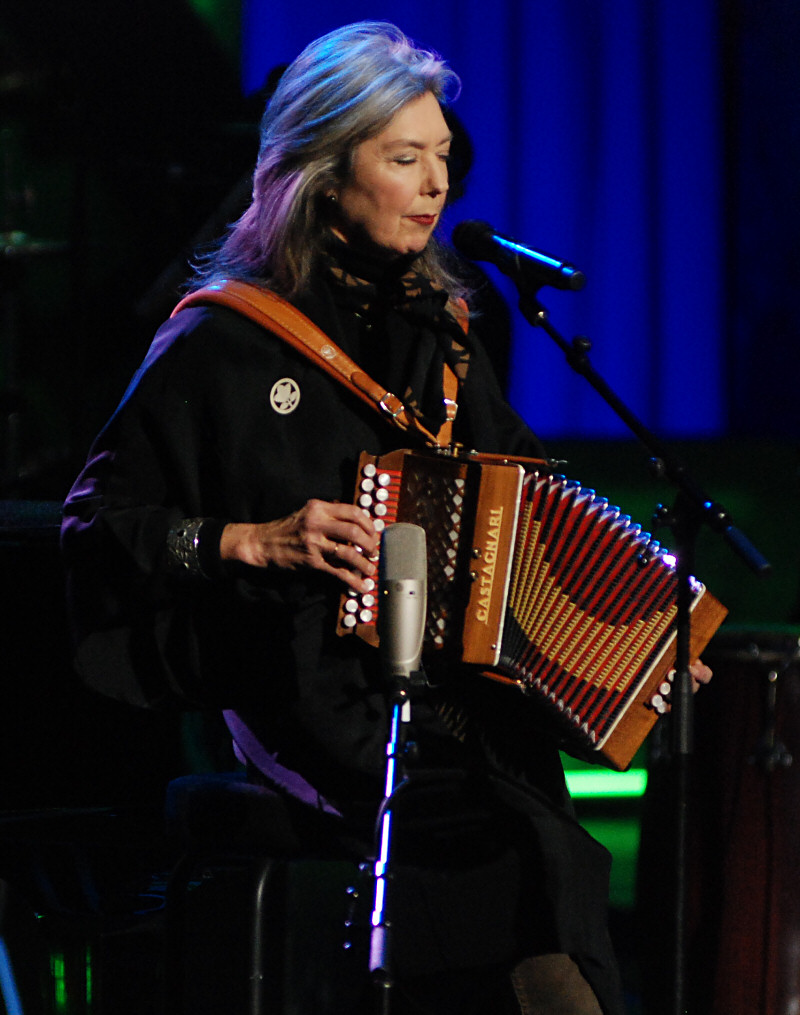
Kate McGarrigle at the 2008 Canadian Songwriters Hall of Fame gala

- January 1 – Lhasa de Sela, folk singer (born 1972)
- January 3 – Barry Blair, comics artist and writer (born 1954)
- January 7 – Alexander Garnet Brown, politician, member of the Nova Scotia House of Assembly (1969–1978) (born 1930)
- January 8
  - Jim Rimmer, graphic designer (born 1934)
  - Jean Charpentier, journalist, press secretary for Prime Minister Pierre Trudeau (born 1936)
- January 11 – Gordon Van Tol, Olympic water polo player (born 1961)
- January 12
  - Georges Anglade, Haitian scientist, author and politician died during the 2010 Haiti earthquake (born 1944)
  - Serge Marcil, former Quebec MNA and federal Member of Parliament
- January 14 – P. K. Page, poet (born 1916)
- January 18
  - Kevin O'Shea, ice hockey player (born 1947)
  - Kate McGarrigle, folk singer (born 1946)
- January 21 – Paul Quarrington, writer (born 1953)
- January 22 – Clayton Gerein, wheelchair sports athlete, seven-time Paralympian (born 1965)
- January 31
  - Edith Josie, newspaper columnist (born 1922)
  - Keith Norton, former Ontario MPP and cabinet minister (born 1941)

=== February ===
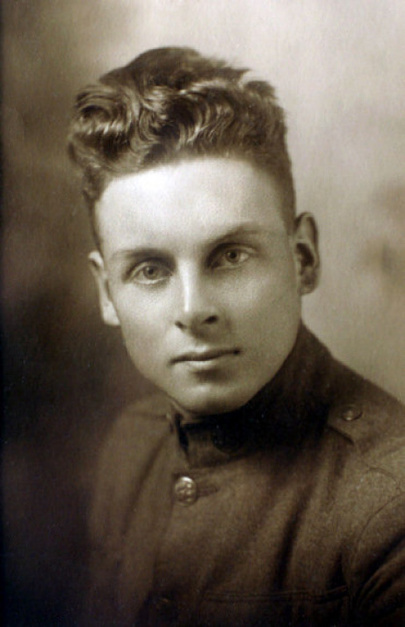
John Babcock in 1920

- February 3 – Lindsay Thomas, stage actress (born 1978)
- February 5 – Brendan Burke, ice hockey player notable for coming out (born 1988)
- February 8 – Jacques Hétu, composer (born 1938)
- February 10 – Charles Baillargeon, professional wrestler (born 1918)
- February 11 – Heward Grafftey, politician, MP for Brome—Missisquoi (1958–1968, 1972–1980) (born 1928)
- February 12 – Nodar Kumaritashvili, Georgian luger (born 1988)
- February 18 – John Babcock, Canada's last surviving World War I veteran (born 1900)
- February 25 – Andrew Koenig, actor (born 1968)
- February 27 – Madeleine Ferron, writer

=== March ===
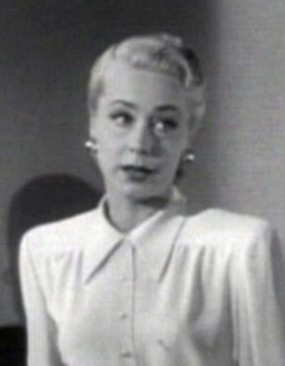
June Havoc in Gentleman's Agreement (1947)

- March 4
  - Arthur Menzies, diplomat (born 1917)
  - André Bouchard, ecologist and environmentalist (born 1946)
- March 5 – Peter Woodcock, serial killer and child rapist (born 1939)
- March 10 – Corey Haim, actor (born 1971)
- March 11
  - Sandy Scott, professional wrestler (born 1934)
  - Louis Holmes, ice hockey player and coach (born 1911)
  - John Hill, professional wrestler (born 1941)
- March 12
  - Bob Attersley, ice hockey player, 1960 Winter Olympics silver medalist (born 1933)
  - David Ahenakew, First Nations leader and politician (born 1933)
- March 13
  - Gary Mittelholtz, journalist (CBC Radio) (born 1954)
  - Leon Manley, football player (Edmonton Eskimos) (born 1926)
- March 14 – John Powles, Head of the Canada-Japan Society, Order of the Rising Sun recipient (born 1949)
- March 15 – Dan Achen, guitarist (Junkhouse) (born 1959)
- March 20
  - Mikel Scicluna, professional wrestler (born 1929)
  - Dorothy Corrigan, politician, first female Mayor of Charlottetown (1968–1972) (born 1914)
- March 21 – Lou Jankowski, ice hockey player (Chicago Black Hawks, Detroit Red Wings) (born 1931)
- March 28
  - Eric Tunney, comedian (Kids in the Hall: Brain Candy) (born 1965)
  - June Havoc, actress (born 1912)
- March 30 – Peter Flinsch, artist (born 1920)

=== April ===
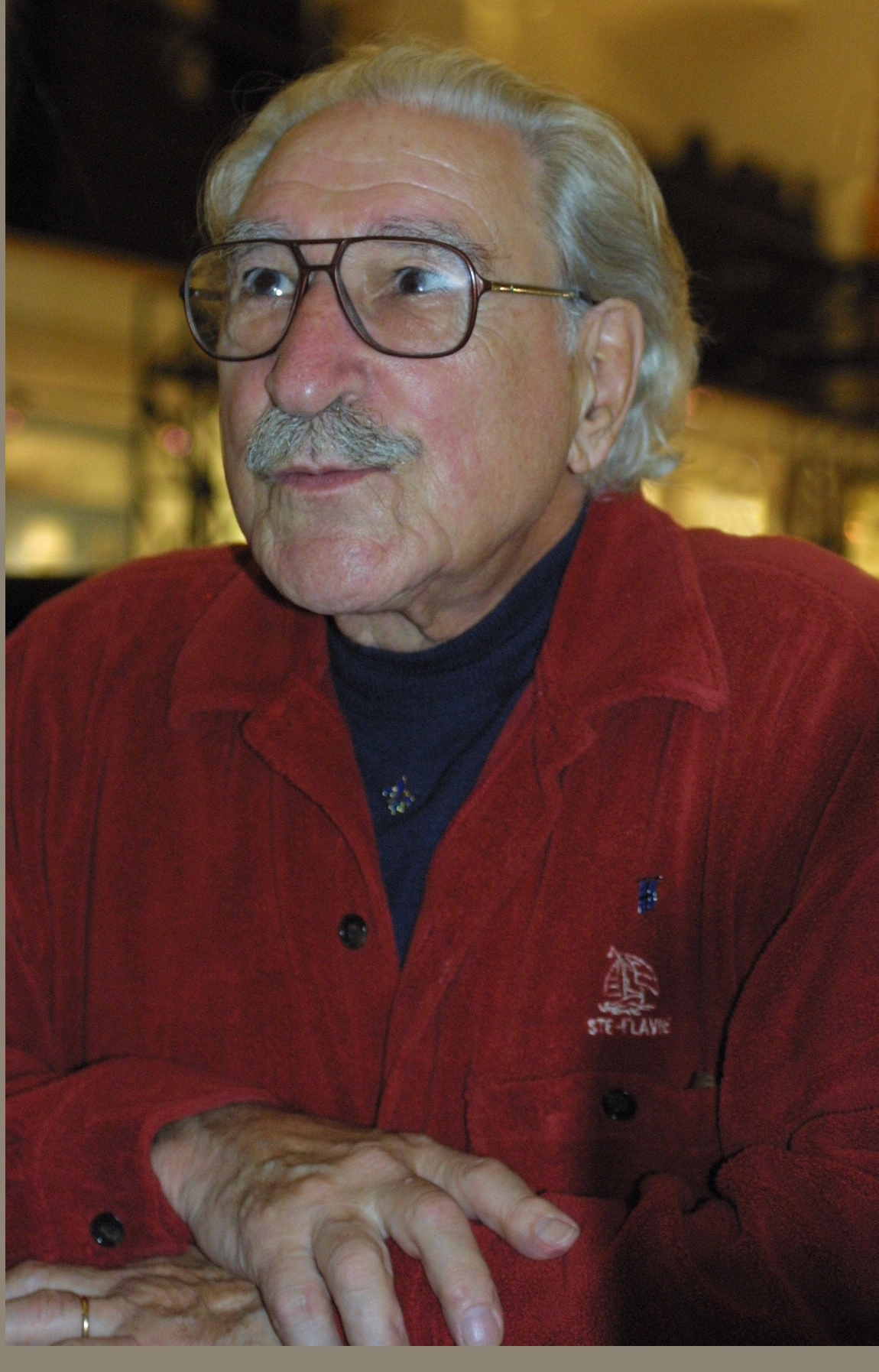
Michel Chartrand in 2003

- April 2 – Edward Bayda, jurist, Chief Justice of Saskatchewan (1981–2006) (born 1931)
- April 4 – Matt Cook, ice sledge hockey player (born 1987)
- April 6 – Eddie Carroll, voice actor (Jiminy Cricket) (born 1933)
- April 12
  - Arnold Spohr, artistic director (Royal Winnipeg Ballet) (born 1923)
  - Robert Pound, physicist (born 1919)
  - Michel Chartrand, activist (born 1916)
- April 14 – Gene Kiniski, professional wrestler (born 1928)
- April 18 – Devon Clifford, drummer (You Say Party! We Say Die!) (born 1980)
- April 22 – Gene Lees, jazz historian and critic (born 1928)
- April 23 – Lorne Atkinson, Olympic cyclist (born 1922)
- April 28 – Connie Codarini, pop and gospel (born 1930)

=== May ===
- May 1 – Lawrence Paul, Mi'kmaq leader, chief of the Membertou First Nation (born 1926)
- May 1 – Rob McConnell, jazz musician (born 1935)
- May 2 – André Lamy, film producer (born 1932)
- May 4 – Glen Shortliffe, Clerk of the Privy Council (born 1937)
- May 5
  - Gwyn Thomas, crime reporter (born 1913)
  - Jack MacDonald, politician, Mayor of Hamilton, Ontario (1977–1980) (born 1927)
  - André Lamy, film producer, Chairman of the National Film Board (1975–1979) (born 1932)
- May 9 – Bill Stanton, footballer (Ottawa Rough Riders) (born 1924)
- May 11 – Bob Watt, Olympic gold medal-winning (1952) ice hockey player (born 1927)
- May 12
  - Mel Perry, curler (born 1935)
  - Charlie Francis, track coach (born 1948)
- May 15 – Armand Caouette, politician, Member of Parliament (1974–1980) (born 1945)
- May 17 – Carla Zilbersmith, actress, singer and comedian (born 1963)
- May 18 – Martha Bielish, politician, Senator (1979–1990) (born 1915)
- May 21 – Robert Gordon Rogers, politician, Lieutenant Governor of British Columbia (1983–1988) (born 1919)
- May 26 – Art Linkletter, television personality (born 1912)
- May 30
  - Tobi Wong, designer (born 1974)
  - Dufferin Roblin, politician, Premier of Manitoba (1958–1967), Senator (1978–1992) (born 1917)
- May 31 – Chris Haney, co-inventor of Trivial Pursuit (born 1950)

=== June ===
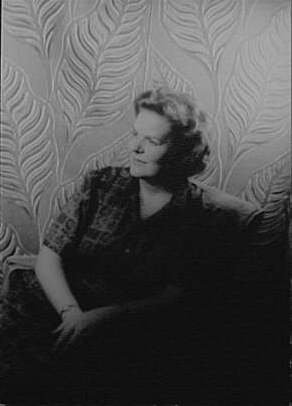
Maureen Forrester photo taken by Carl Van Vechten

- June 2 – John Richardson, member of the House of Commons (born 1932)
- June 9 – Bobby Kromm, ice hockey coach (Detroit Red Wings, Winnipeg Jets) (born 1928)
- June 15 – Charles Thomas Beer, chemist (born 1915)
- June 16 – Maureen Forrester, opera singer (born 1930)
- June 21
  - With Approval, Thoroughbred racehorse, Canadian Triple Crown winner (1989) (born 1986)
  - Irwin Barker, comedian and television writer (This Hour Has 22 Minutes, Rick Mercer Report) (born 1952)
- June 22 – Tracy Wright, actress (born 1959)
- June 23
  - Garrison James, politician, senior member of Legislative Assembly of Saskatchewan (born 1933)
  - Ron Atchison, football player (Saskatchewan Roughriders) (born 1930)
- June 24 – Shirley Carr, President of the Labour Congress (born 1926)
- June 28 – Willie Huber, ice hockey player (Detroit Red Wings) (born 1958)
- June 29 – Frank Rigney, football player (Winnipeg Blue Bombers) (born 1936)

=== July ===
- July 3 – Murray Chercover, broadcaster and CEO (CTV Television) (born 1929)
- July 4 – Oscar Kruger, football player (Edmonton Eskimos) (born 1932, 1933)
- July 5
  - Bob Probert, ice hockey player (Detroit Red Wings, Chicago Blackhawks) (born 1965)
  - Jim Bohlen, environmentalist (born 1926)
- July 9 – Glenna Evans, longboarder (born 1983)
- July 10 – Ray Beachey, historian (born 1915)
- July 21 – John E. Irving, industrialist (born 1932)
- July 22 – Peter Hart, historian (born 1963)
- July 23 – Dorothy Stowe, activist, co-founder of Greenpeace (born 1920)
- July 27
  - Maury Chaykin, actor (born 1949)
  - Edward Gamblin, country rock singer-songwriter
- July 28
  - David William, actor and artistic director (born 1926)
  - John Aylesworth, television writer and producer, co-creator of Hee Haw (born 1928)
  - Todd Hardy, leader of the Yukon New Democratic Party from 2002 to 2009 (born 1957)
- July 30
  - Gordon Massie, Communist politician (b. late 1960s)
  - Otto Joachim, violist and composer of electronic music (born 1910)

=== August ===
- August 1
  - Larry Yachimec, actor (born 1959)
  - Bruce Garvey, journalist (born 1939)
- August 8 – Ted Kowalski, singer (The Diamonds) (born 1931)
- August 9
  - John Yaremko, politician, MPP for Bellwoods (1951–1975) (born 1918)
  - Paul Rexe, politician and writer (born 1944)
- August 10 – Shirley Thomson, arts administrator (born 1930)
- August 12 – Mario Laguë, diplomat, Liberal Party communications director (born 1958)
- August 19 – Dick Maloney, singer (born 1933)
- August 21 – Nancy Dolman, actress (Soap), wife of Martin Short (born 1951)
- August 26 – Charlotte Tansey, educator (born 1922)
- August 27 – Luna Vachon, professional wrestler (born 1962)
- August 29 – Courtney Milne, nature photographer (born 1944)
- August 31 – John Rowswell, politician, Mayor of Sault Ste. Marie, Ontario (born 1955)

=== September ===
- September 1 – Herb Larson, professional wrestler (born 1927)
- September 3 – Brian R. Wood, computer game designer (Company of Heroes Online) (born 1977)
- September 6 – Yvonne O'Neill, politician, MPP for Ottawa–Rideau (1987–1995) (born 1936)
- September 7 – Claude Béchard, politician, MNA for Kamouraska-Témiscouata (1997–2010) (born 1969)
- September 9 – Mary Richard, aboriginal activist and politician (born 1940)
- September 10 – Billie Mae Richards, voice actress (The Care Bears Movie, Rudolph the Red-Nosed Reindeer, Rudolph's Shiny New Year) (born 1921)
- September 12 – Val Belcher, football player (Ottawa Rough Riders) (born 1954)
- September 18 – Irving Schwartz, businessman (born 1929)
- September 21 – Sindi Hawkins, politician, MLA for Okanagan West (1996–2001) and Kelowna-Mission (2001–2009) (born 1958)
- September 22 – Jackie Burroughs, actress (Road to Avonlea, The Care Bears Movie, Willard) (born 1939)
- September 23 – William Andres, politician (born 1925)
- September 28 – Norman Atkins, political strategist and senator from Ontario (1986–2009) (born 1934)

=== October ===
- October 2
  - Stephen Griew, gerontologist (born 1928)
  - Maurice Foster, politician, MP for Algoma (1968–1993) MP for Algoma (1968–1993) (born 1933)
- October 3
  - Ben Mondor, baseball executive (Pawtucket Red Sox) (born 1925)
  - Dianne Whalen, politician, MHA for Conception Bay East and Bell Island (2003–2010) (born 1951)
- October 6 – Jay Roberts, football player, lung cancer (born 1942)
- October 10 – A. Edison Stairs, businessman and politician, New Brunswick MLA (1960–1978) and Minister of Finance (1974–1976), natural causes (born 1924)
- October 16 – Jack Butterfield, president of the American Hockey League (1969–1994) (born 1919)
- October 17
  - John Baird Finlay, politician, MP for Oxford (1993–2004) (born 1929)
  - Jake Dunlap, football player (Ottawa Rough Riders) (born 1925)
- October 22
  - Denis Simpson, singer and actor (born 1950)
  - Helen Hunley, former lieutenant governor of Alberta (born 1920)
- October 24 – Alex Oakley, Olympic race walker (born 1926)
- October 30 – Édouard Carpentier, professional wrestler (born 1926)

=== November ===
- November 1 – Ed Litzenberger, ice hockey right winger (born 1932)
- November 3
  - Bill Colvin, Olympic bronze medal-winning (1956) ice hockey player (born 1934)
  - Jim Clench, bass guitarist (April Wine, Bachman–Turner Overdrive) (born 1949)
- November 5 – David Steuart, politician, Saskatchewan MLA (1962–1977) and Leader of the Opposition (1971–1976), Senator (1975–1991) (born 1916)
- November 9 – Albert Wesley Johnson, civil servant, President of Canadian Broadcasting Corporation (1975–1982) (born 1923)
- November 10 – Nicolo Rizzuto, mafia leader (Rizzuto crime family) (born 1924)
- November 18 – Gaye Stewart, ice hockey player (born 1923)
- November 19 – Pat Burns, National Hockey League coach (Canadiens, Maple Leafs, Bruins and Devils) (born 1952)
- November 22
  - Len Lunde, ice hockey player (born 1936)
  - David Lam, politician, Lieutenant Governor of British Columbia (1988–1995) (born 1923)
- November 23 – Kananginak Pootoogook, Inuk artist (born 1935)

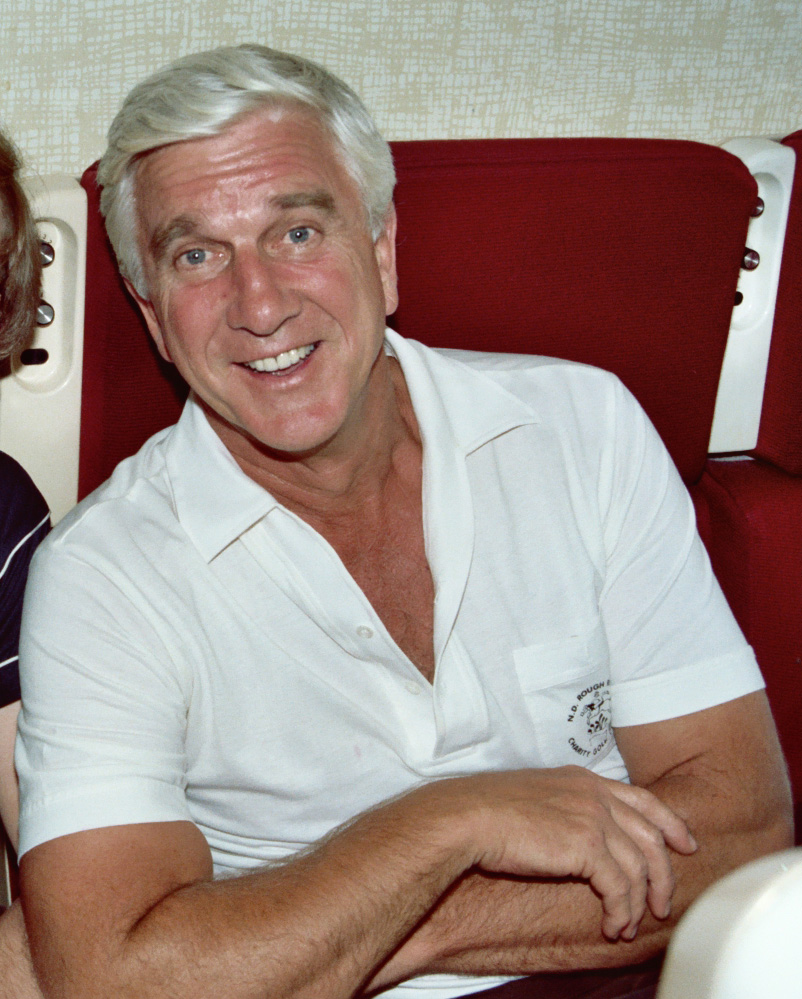
Leslie Nielsen died November 28

- November 25
  - Ann Southam, composer (born 1937)
  - Doris McCarthy, artist (born 1910)
- November 28
  - Keir Clark, Prince Edward Island politician (born 1910)
  - Leslie Nielsen, comedian and actor (Airplane!, The Naked Gun) (born 1926)

=== December ===
- December 5 – David French, playwright (Leaving Home)
- December 6 – Mark Dailey, television journalist and announcer
- December 16 – Sterling Lyon, politician and 17th Premier of Manitoba (born 1927)
- December 29 – Michael Fainstat, Montreal city councillor

== See also ==
- 2010 in Canadian music
- 2010 in Canadian television
- List of Canadian films of 2010
