= Swimming at the 1984 Summer Olympics – Men's 1500 metre freestyle =

Men's 1500 metre freestyle at the Games of the XXIII Olympiad
- Venue: McDonald's Olympic Swim Stadium
- Date: 4 August 1984 (heats & final)
- Competitors: 28 from 20 nations
- Winning time: 15:05.20

Medalists
1st place, gold medalist(s)		Mike O'Brien	United States
2nd place, silver medalist(s)		George DiCarlo	United States
3rd place, bronze medalist(s)		Stefan Pfeiffer	West Germany

The final of the men's 1500 metre freestyle event at the 1984 Summer Olympics was held in the McDonald's Olympic Swim Stadium in Los Angeles, California, on August 4, 1984.

== Records ==
Prior to this competition, the existing world and Olympic records were as follows.

World record	Vladimir Salnikov (URS)	14:54.76	Moscow, Soviet Union	22 February 1983
Olympic record	Vladimir Salnikov (URS)	14:58.27	Moscow, Soviet Union	22 July 1980

== Results ==
=== Heats ===
Rule: The eight fastest swimmers advance to final A (Q).

Rank	Heat	Lane	Name	Nationality	Time	Notes
1	3	4	Mike O'Brien	United States	15:21.04	Q
2	2	4	Stefan Pfeiffer	West Germany	15:21.95	Q
3	3	3	Stefano Grandi	Italy	15:22.49	Q, NR
4	4	4	George DiCarlo	United States	15:22.88	Q
5	4	5	Rainer Henkel	West Germany	15:23.60	Q
6	4	2	David Shemilt	Canada	15:24.78	Q, NR
7	3	6	Wayne Shillington	Australia	15:25.67	Q
8	2	6	Franck Iacono	France	15:27.27	Q
9	1	5	Justin Lemberg	Australia	15:29.74	
10	2	3	Carlos Scanavino	Uruguay	15:29.78	NR
11	1	4	Rafael Escalas	Spain	15:30.09	
12	4	3	David Stacey	Great Britain	15:30.10	
13	1	2	Bernard Volz	Canada	15:31.38	
14	1	6	Mike Davidson	New Zealand	15:35.43	
15	2	5	Borut Petrič	Yugoslavia	15:36.44	
16	3	5	Darjan Petrič	Yugoslavia	15:39.79	
17	1	3	Marcelo Jucá	Brazil	15:43.80	
18	4	6	Juan Enrique Escalas	Spain	15:44.85	
19	4	7	Marc Van De Weghe	Belgium	15:45.50	
20	2	2	Alejandro Lecot	Argentina	15:49.94	
21	3	7	Stuart Willmott	Great Britain	15:57.79	
22	3	2	Anders Holmertz	Sweden	16:11.38	
23	3	1	Wu Ming-hsun	Chinese Taipei	16:14.40	
24	2	1	William Wilson	Philippines	16:24.81	
25	1	7	Lin Chun-hong	Chinese Taipei	16:44.94	
26	2	7	Scott Newkirk	Virgin Islands	16:50.55	
27	1	1	Julian Bolling	Sri Lanka	17:16.92	
	4	1	Ahmet Nakkaş	Turkey	DNS	

=== Final ===
Rank	Lane	Name	Nationality	Time	Notes
1st place, gold medalist(s)	4	Mike O'Brien	United States	15:05.20	
2nd place, silver medalist(s)	6	George DiCarlo	United States	15:10.59	
3rd place, bronze medalist(s)	5	Stefan Pfeiffer	West Germany	15:12.77	NR
4	2	Rainer Henkel	West Germany	15:20.03	
5	8	Franck Iacono	France	15:26.96	NR
6	3	Stefano Grandi	Italy	15:28.58	
7	7	David Shemilt	Canada	15:31.28	
8	1	Wayne Shillington	Australia	15:38.18	
