= Swimming at the 1984 Summer Olympics – Men's 400 metre freestyle =

Men's 400 metre freestyle at the Games of the XXIII Olympiad
- Venue: McDonald's Olympic Swim Stadium
- Date: 2 August 1984 (heats & final)
- Competitors: 37 from 26 nations
- Winning time: 3:51.23

Medalists
1st place, gold medalist(s)		George DiCarlo	United States
2nd place, silver medalist(s)		John Mykkanen	United States
3rd place, bronze medalist(s)		Justin Lemberg	Australia

The final of the men's 400 metre freestyle event at the 1984 Summer Olympics was held in the McDonald's Olympic Swim Stadium in Los Angeles, California, on August 2, 1984. The first eight swimmers qualified for the final, while the next eight qualified for the B-final.

== Records ==
Prior to this competition, the existing world and Olympic records were as follows:

World record	Vladimir Salnikov (URS)	3:48.32	Moscow, Soviet Union	19 February 1983
Olympic record	Vladimir Salnikov (URS)	3:51.31	Moscow, Soviet Union	24 July 1980

The following records were established during the competition:

Date	Round	Name	Nation	Time	Record
2 August	Final B	Thomas Fahrner	West Germany	3:50.91	OR

== Results ==
=== Heats ===
Rule: The eight fastest swimmers advance to final A (Q), while the next eight to final B (q).

Rank	Heat	Lane	Name	Nationality	Time	Notes
1	1	4	Stefan Pfeiffer	West Germany	3:53.41	Q
2	4	4	John Mykkanen	United States	3:53.43	Q
3	5	4	George DiCarlo	United States	3:53.44	Q
4	2	4	Justin Lemberg	Australia	3:53.89	Q
5	4	5	Darjan Petrič	Yugoslavia	3:54.39	Q
6	1	5	Marco Dell'Uomo	Italy	3:55.00	Q, NR
7	4	3	Ron McKeon	Australia	3:55.06	Q
8	5	3	Franck Iacono	France	3:55.07	Q
9	3	4	Thomas Fahrner	West Germany	3:55.26	q
10	3	6	Peter Szmidt	Canada	3:55.65	q
11	3	5	Carlos Scanavino	Uruguay	3:55.92	q, WD
12	1	3	Juan Enrique Escalas	Spain	3:55.93	q
13	2	3	Borut Petrič	Yugoslavia	3:56.07	q, WD
14	5	6	Stefano Grandi	Italy	3:56.23	q
15	2	5	Marcelo Jucá	Brazil	3:57.43	q
16	4	6	Mike Davidson	New Zealand	3:57.88	q
16	5	5	Arne Borgstrøm	Norway	3:57.88	q
18	3	3	Andrew Astbury	Great Britain	3:58.41	q
19	2	6	David Shemilt	Canada	3:58.43	
20	2	7	Marc Van De Weghe	Belgium	4:00.01	
21	3	2	Anders Grillhammar	Sweden	4:00.26	
22	2	2	Shigeo Ogata	Japan	4:02.97	
23	4	2	Jean-Marie François	Venezuela	4:03.08	
24	1	6	Anders Holmertz	Sweden	4:03.67	
25	5	6	Paul Howe	Great Britain	4:04.07	
26	3	7	Alejandro Lecot	Argentina	4:05.74	
27	5	1	Keisuke Okuno	Japan	4:06.31	
28	3	1	William Wilson	Philippines	4:06.86	
29	4	1	Gökhan Attaroglu	Turkey	4:07.07	
30	1	7	Franz Mortensen	Denmark	4:09.80	
31	5	7	Evert Johan Kroon	Netherlands Antilles	4:11.97	
32	1	2	Scott Newkirk	Virgin Islands	4:12.61	
33	1	1	Wu Ming-hsun	Chinese Taipei	4:13.11	
34	2	1	Ahmet Nakkaş	Turkey	4:16.49	
35	5	8	Lin Chun-hong	Chinese Taipei	4:20.65	
36	4	8	Julian Bolling	Sri Lanka	4:23.42	
	4	7	Fabián Ferrari	Argentina	DNS	

=== Finals ===
==== Final B ====
Rank	Lane	Name	Nationality	Time	Notes
9	4	Thomas Fahrner	West Germany	3:50.91	OR
10	3	Juan Enrique Escalas	Spain	3:55.25	
11	5	Peter Szmidt	Canada	3:56.99	
12	6	Stefano Grandi	Italy	3:57.17	
13	7	Arne Borgstrøm	Norway	3:57.46	
14	8	Andrew Astbury	Great Britain	3:58.14	
15	2	Marcelo Jucá	Brazil	3:58.23	
16	1	Mike Davidson	New Zealand	3:58.24	

==== Final A ====
Rank	Lane	Name	Nationality	Time	Notes
1st place, gold medalist(s)	3	George DiCarlo	United States	3:51.23	
2nd place, silver medalist(s)	5	John Mykkanen	United States	3:51.49	
3rd place, bronze medalist(s)	6	Justin Lemberg	Australia	3:51.79	OC
4	4	Stefan Pfeiffer	West Germany	3:52.91	
5	8	Franck Iacono	France	3:54.58	NR
6	2	Darjan Petrič	Yugoslavia	3:54.88	
7	7	Marco Dell'Uomo	Italy	3:55.44	
8	1	Ron McKeon	Australia	3:55.48	
