= Justin Lemberg =

Australian swimmer

Personal information
- Full name: Justin William Lemberg
- National team: Australia
- Born: 23 August 1966 (age 59) Brisbane, Queensland
- Height: 1.78 m (5 ft 10 in)
- Weight: 65 kg (143 lb)

Sport
- Sport: Swimming
- Strokes: Freestyle
- College team: University of Alabama
Medal record
Men's swimming
Representing Australia
Olympic Games
Bronze medal – third place	1984 Los Angeles	400 m freestyle
Pan Pacific Games
Gold medal – first place	1985 Tokyo	400 m freestyle
Summer Universiade
Gold medal – first place	1985 Kobe	400 m freestyle

Justin William Lemberg (born 23 August 1966) is an Australian former middle-distance swimmer of the 1980s, who won a bronze medal in the 400-metre freestyle, swimming at the 1984 Summer Olympics in Los Angeles. He was coached by the flamboyant Laurie Lawrence.

Born and raised in Brisbane, Queensland, Lemberg put in the best performance of his life to improve his Australian record by more than two seconds to claim bronze, just 0.56 seconds behind the American duo of George DiCarlo and John Mykkanen. He also competed in the 200-metre and 1500-metre freestyle events, but was eliminated in the heats. He narrowly missed a second bronze, coming fourth as part of the 4x200-metre freestyle relay.

== See also ==
- List of Olympic medalists in swimming (men)
