= Fukumoto =

Fukumoto (written: 福本, 福元 or ふくもと in hiragana) is a Japanese surname. Notable people with the surname include:

- Atsumi Fukumoto (福本 温子; born 1988), Japanese rower
- Beth Fukumoto (born 1983), American politician
- Kan Fukumoto (ふくもと かん), Japanese anime director
- Fukumoto Kazuo (福本 和夫; 1894–1983), Japanese Marxist
- Miho Fukumoto (福元 美穂; born 1983), Japanese footballer
- Miyuki Fukumoto (福本 幸; born 1977), Japanese high jumper
- Nobuyuki Fukumoto (福本 伸行; born 1958), Japanese manga artist
- Seizō Fukumoto (福本 清三; 1943–2021), Japanese actor
- Tomoya Fukumoto (福元 友哉; born 1999), Japanese footballer
- Toshio Fukumoto (福元 寿夫; born 1960), Japanese water polo player
- Yohei Fukumoto (福元 洋平; born 1987), Japanese footballer
- Yu Fukumoto (福本 悠; born 2002), Japanese footballer
- Yutaka Fukumoto (福本 豊; born 1947), Japanese baseball player
