= Sainte-Anne-de-Prescott =

Ste-Anne-de-Prescott Ste-Anne
- Unincorporated community
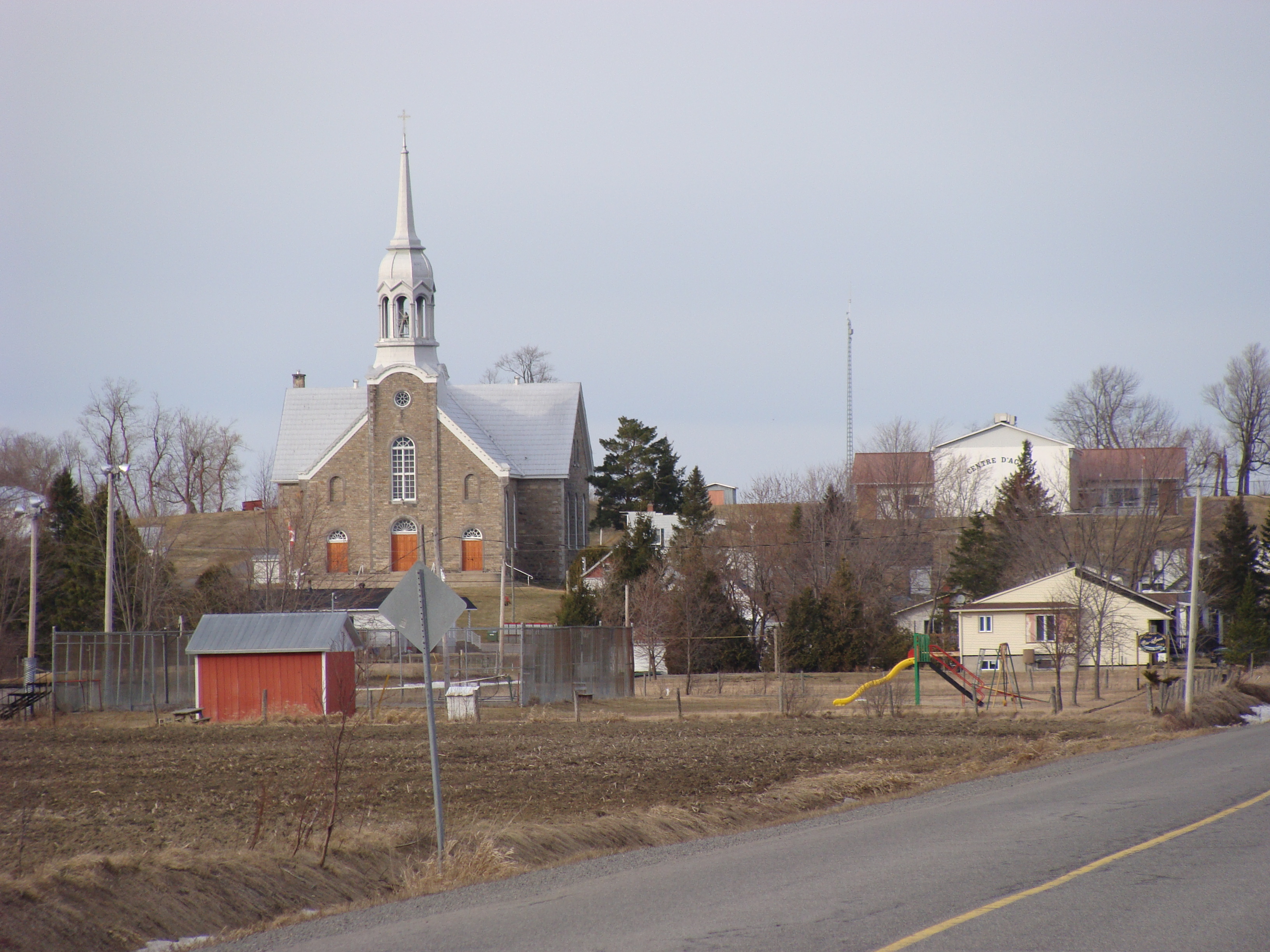

- Ste-Anne-de-Prescott
- Coordinates: 45°26′32″N 74°28′15″W
- Country: Canada
- Province: Ontario
- County: Prescott and Russell
- Municipality: East Hawkesbury

Government
  - Fed. riding: Prescott—Russell—Cumberland
  - Prov. riding: Glengarry—Prescott—Russell
- Time zone: UTC-5 (EST)
  - Summer (DST): UTC-4 (EDT)
- Postal code: K0B 1M0
- Area codes: 613, 343
- Website: ste-anne.ca

Ste-Anne-de-Prescott (sometimes written as Sainte-Anne-de-Prescott) or alternatively Ste-Anne, is a predominantly francophone town in the United Counties of Prescott and Russell, near the Quebec border and Glengarry County, in Ontario Canada. It is a part of and the seat of the Municipality of East Hawkesbury.

== Geography ==
Sainte-Anne-de-Prescott is a village in eastern Ontario and near the Quebec border. Nearby locations include Saint-Eugene and Sainte-Justine-de-Newton which is in the Regional County Municipality of Vaudreuil-Soulanges.

== History ==
In the early nineteenth century, the area was occupied by a handful of settlers, mostly British. In 1847 the diocese of Bytown (Ottawa) founded a settlement company that promotes immigration in eastern Ontario to combat the exodus of Canadians to the United States and to ensure the Catholic presence in Ontario. The parish received its official title in 1885. The reason for the choice of St. Anne as patron remains unknown but Prescott comes from the name given to the county. Prescott County is named for Robert Prescott (1726-1815), a distinguished soldier who was Governor-in-Chief of the Canadas from 1796-1799.

=== Church ===
The construction of the church began on August 9, 1883 in order to celebrate the first mass in the sacristy on January 13, 1884. The bell was acquired from the Ernest Chanteloup Company that same year. The church was blessed by Bishop Duhamel September 4, 1884 and the first resident pastor, Joseph E. Coderre, arrived on June 9, 1885. In 1897, the construction of the transepts were completed, and the church acquired a Casavant Frères (opus 85). In 1914 the interior was greatly enhanced through the paintings, executives and faux marble columns made by the painter Toussaint-Xénophon Renaud. In 1921, the cemetery was embellished with an angel of the resurrection of Louis Jobin. The interior restorations of 1958 and 2002 refreshed the colours of the church but several decorative elements were lost. The church has a painting by Toussaint-Xénophon Renaud representing the death of St. Joseph, which was restored in 2013.

== Economy ==
There are some 70 companies in Sainte-Anne-de-Prescott. The local economy is based on agriculture.

== Society ==
The volunteers of this community of about 500 residents organize community and sports activities every year. In addition, it is home to various regional and interprovincial activities such as the Ancient Day, the pilgrimage to Sainte-Anne (since 2002), and the "Gala Folklorique". Sainte-Anne-de-Prescott celebrated its 125th anniversary in 2010.

=== Stations of the cross ===
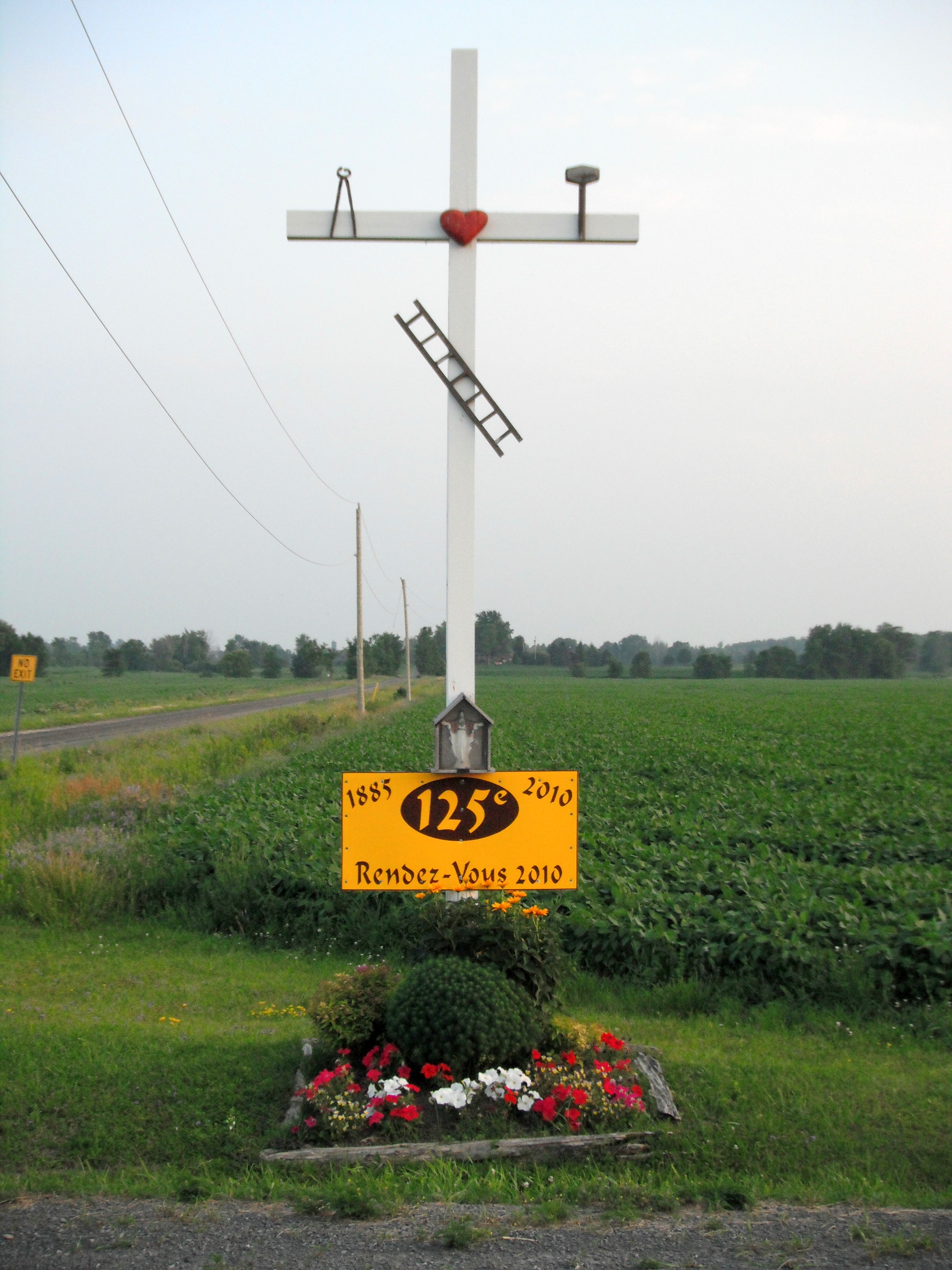
Cross on Lavigne Road

Ste-Anne-de-Prescott is one of the few villages in Ontario that have retained many of its stations of the cross.
