= Mike O'Brien (swimmer) =

American swimmer

Personal information
- Full name: Michael Jon O'Brien
- Nickname: "Mike"
- National team: United States
- Born: October 23, 1965 (age 61) Skokie, Illinois, U.S.
- Occupations: Business management Swim instruction
- Height: 6 ft 6 in (1.98 m)
- Weight: 154 lb (70 kg)
- Spouse: Kristin
- Children: 2

Sport
- Sport: Swimming
- Strokes: Backstroke, freestyle
- Club: Mission Viejo Nadadores
- College team: University of Southern Cal., 1984-88
- Coach: Mark Schubert (Nadadores); Peter Daland (USC)
Medal record
Men's swimming
Representing the United States
Olympic Games
Gold medal – first place	1984 Los Angeles	1500 m freestyle
Pan American Games
Gold medal – first place	1987 Indianapolis	200 m backstroke
Gold medal – first place	1987 Indianapolis	4x200 m freestyle
Bronze medal – third place	1983 Caracas	400 m medley
Summer Universiade
Silver medal – second place	1985 Kobe	1500 m freestyle

Michael Jon O'Brien (born October 23, 1965) is an American former competition swimmer who won the gold medal in the men's 1,500-meter freestyle event at the 1984 Summer Olympics and a bronze and two golds in the Pan Am Games.

== Early swim career ==
Learning to swim at the age of only four, Mike joined a competitive swim team at five. He developed as a talented competitive swimmer in grade school, and by high school was recognized nationally as an outstanding backstroke swimmer and freestyle distance swimmer with his early team, the Irvine Novas.

Newport Christian, the private high school Mike attended, lacked a swimming program, so he swam for the exceptional Mission Viejo Nadadores from his first year in High School. In his senior year in High School, he distinguished himself as a premier American distance swimmer winning his first US National Championship with a 4:16.88 in the 500-yard freestyle. He would take four more National Championships in his career.

== 1984 LA Olympics ==
On August 3, 1984, O'Brien's 1500 swim time of 15:05.2 was sufficient to take Olympic gold in the 1500 m freestyle at the 1984 Los Angeles Olympics. Lagging five seconds behind O'Brien, American George DiCarlo took the silver. Stefan Pfeiffer of Germany took the bronze with a time of 15:12.11.

O'Brien won the tight Olympic race in August despite being involved in a minor car accident, just two months earlier on June 30 on the day of the trials in Indianapolis, where he suffered bruises on both knees, a chipped tooth, and a bump to the head.

The distance had recently been swum in 14:54 by Russian Vladimir Salnikov. At the Moscow Olympics in 1980, Salnikov had become the first person to break the 15 minute barrier, and in his home country, adding considerable interest by the press with his performance. Salnikov, however, did not compete in 1984 with O'Brien. O'Brien's subsequent win nine seconds slower than the previous Olympic winner in the event was anti-climatic, but referring to Salnikov's faster time and more historic finish, "I think, though, that if he’d have been in the same pool swimming right next to me, I could’ve given him a good race.”

== Early swim career ==
In his early swimming career, he swam for Southern California's Mission Viejo Nadadores, one of the nation's most outstanding programs, under Mark Schubert.

== College Swimming ==
In his first year at USC, where he was coached by Peter Daland, he placed first in the 500- and 1,650-yard freestyles taking two NCAA titles. He won American National titles in the 1650, 1000, and 500 yard freestyles, and more impressively, in the 500 and 1000 yard freestyle set two American Records. His 1000-yard record remained active for 13 years.

== Pan Am Games ==
As noted in the "Medals" pull-down in the infobox at right, at the 1983 Pan Am Games in Caracas, in the 400 IM he took a bronze medal. Returning to the Pan Ams in Indianapolis in 1987, he won golds in the 200 backstroke and the 4x200 freestyle relay.

== Later life ==
After college graduation from USC in 1988, he began work in insurance and real estate. He did some work providing commentary for televised swimming competitions, including NBC's 1992 Barcelona Olympic coverage. In the Newport Beach area and at the University of California, Irvine, he coached swimming. In 1993, O’Brien and his wife Kristin opened and have since operated Mike O’Brien Swim Instruction, at various venues, including home pools in Los Angeles and Orange Counties.

== See also ==
- List of Olympic medalists in swimming (men)
- List of University of Southern California people
