= Wayne Shillington =

Australian swimmer

Personal information
- Born: 11 November 1966 (age 59)

Sport
- Sport: Swimming
- Strokes: freestyle

Wayne Anthony Shillington (born 11 November 1966) is an Australian swimmer. He competed in the men's 1500 metre freestyle at the 1984 Summer Olympics.
