= George DiCarlo =

American swimmer (born 1963)

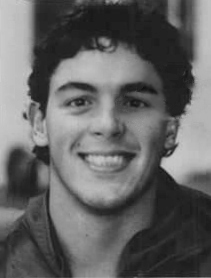
- DiCarlo in 1984

Personal information
- Full name: George Thomas DiCarlo
- National team: United States
- Born: July 13, 1963 (age 63) St. Petersburg, Florida, U.S.
- Height: 5 ft 11 in (1.80 m)
- Weight: 163 lb (74 kg)

Sport
- Sport: Swimming
- Strokes: Freestyle
- College team: University of Arizona
- Coach: Dick Jochums; University of Arizona
Medal record
Representing the United States
Olympic Games
Gold medal – first place	1984 Los Angeles	400 m freestyle
Silver medal – second place	1984 Los Angeles	1500 m freestyle

George Thomas DiCarlo (born July 13, 1963) is an American former competition swimmer who was a two-time 1984 Olympic medalist in the 400 and 1500-meter freestyle, where he set American records in both events. At the University of Arizona, he broke the American record for the 500-yard freestyle as well.

DiCarlo attended Thomas Jefferson High School, and swam primarily for the Colorado Rapids Swim Team, out of the Denver, Colorado area. At the AAU Junior Olympic Short Course Swimming Championships in Lincoln, Nebraska in April 1980, swimming in his Junior year in High School, he set a new meet record 15:32.04 in the 1,650 free. A committed distance swimmer at only 17, at the same Junior Olympic championships, in the 500-yard freestyle he took a third place with a 4:31.05, placing him only four seconds out of the first place finisher's record time.

DiCarlo attended University of Arizona, under Hall of Fame Head Coach Dick Jochums and competed for the Arizona Wildcats swimming and diving team. At Arizona, DiCarlo was an NCAA Champion in the 500-yard freestyle in both 1983 and 1984 and had the uncommon distinction of earning All American honors during all four years of his swimming eligibility. He broke the American record in the 500-yard freestyle twice.

He was the top US 1,500-meter swimmer in 1982 at the World trials. In the 1982 FINA World Aquatic Championships in Guayaquil, Ecuador, he placed sixth in the event, with Russia's Vladimir Salnikov taking the gold.

== 1984 Los Angeles Olympics ==
=== Trials in Indianapolis ===
In one of the high points of his swimming career, at the 1984 Olympic trials in Indianapolis, DiCarlo broke Brian Goodell's standing American records in both the 400-meter and 1,500 meter freestyles and qualified in both events with first place finishes. In the 1500-meter final he swam a 15:01.51 to break Goodell's standing eight year old American record, and in the 400-meter he swam a 3:51.03, taking three seconds off his best time, to break Goodell's standing seven-year American record in the event.

=== Los Angeles Olympic finals ===
DiCarlo won the gold medal and broke the Olympic record in the finals of the 400-meter freestyle event at the 1984 Summer Olympics in Los Angeles. He also won the silver medal in the 1,500-meter freestyle final.

In the final of the 400-meter, DiCarlo's signature event, he and American John Mykkanen battled in an extremely close race, with DiCarlo edging out Mykkanen and winning gold in 3:51.23. But his time did not beat Russian Vladimir Salnikov's February 1983 time of 3:48.93. Salnikov did not compete, however. American Mykkanen took the silver followed by Australian Justin Lemberg for the bronze. DiCarlo's Gold Medal-winning 400M time was also slower than the winner of the B-final, Thomas Fahrner (West Germany), who set an Olympic record in the consolation finals (3:50.91). DiCarlo set an Olympic record in the 1500, a significant career highlight, but it could not match Salnikov's standing world record.

DiCarlo returned to Colorado after his swimming career ended. He earned a Pharmacy degree at the University of Florida and gradually worked his way into becoming a Director of medical affairs in oncology for pharmaceutical company Merck.

=== Honors ===
DiCarlo was an inductee into the University of Arizona Sports Hall of Fame, in 1990 and in 2012 in statewide honors, became a member of the Colorado Swimming Hall of Fame.

== See also ==
- List of Olympic medalists in swimming (men)
- List of University of Arizona people
