= Dave Jones (volleyball) =

Canadian volleyball player (born 1959)

Personal information
- Born: 22 August 1959 (age 65); Guelph, Ontario, Canada

Sport
- Sport: Volleyball

Dave Jones (born 22 August 1959) is a Canadian volleyball player. He competed in the men's tournament at the 1984 Summer Olympics.
