= Paul Gratton =

Canadian volleyball player (born 1958)

Personal information
- Born: 8 November 1958 (age 66); Ottawa, Ontario, Canada

Sport
- Sport: Volleyball

Paul Gratton (born 8 November 1958) is a Canadian former volleyball player. He competed in the men's tournament at the 1984 Summer Olympics.
