= David Churchill =

Canadian swimmer (born 1963)

Personal information
- Born: 18 August 1963 (age 62) Calgary, Alberta, Canada

Sport
- Sport: Swimming
Medal record
Representing Canada
Pan American Games
Silver medal – second place	1983 Caracas	4x100m medley relay

David Churchill (born 18 August 1963) is a Canadian former butterfly and freestyle swimmer. He competed in three events at the 1984 Summer Olympics.
