= Irving Schwartz =

Canadian businessman (1929–2010)

Irving Schwartz O.C.
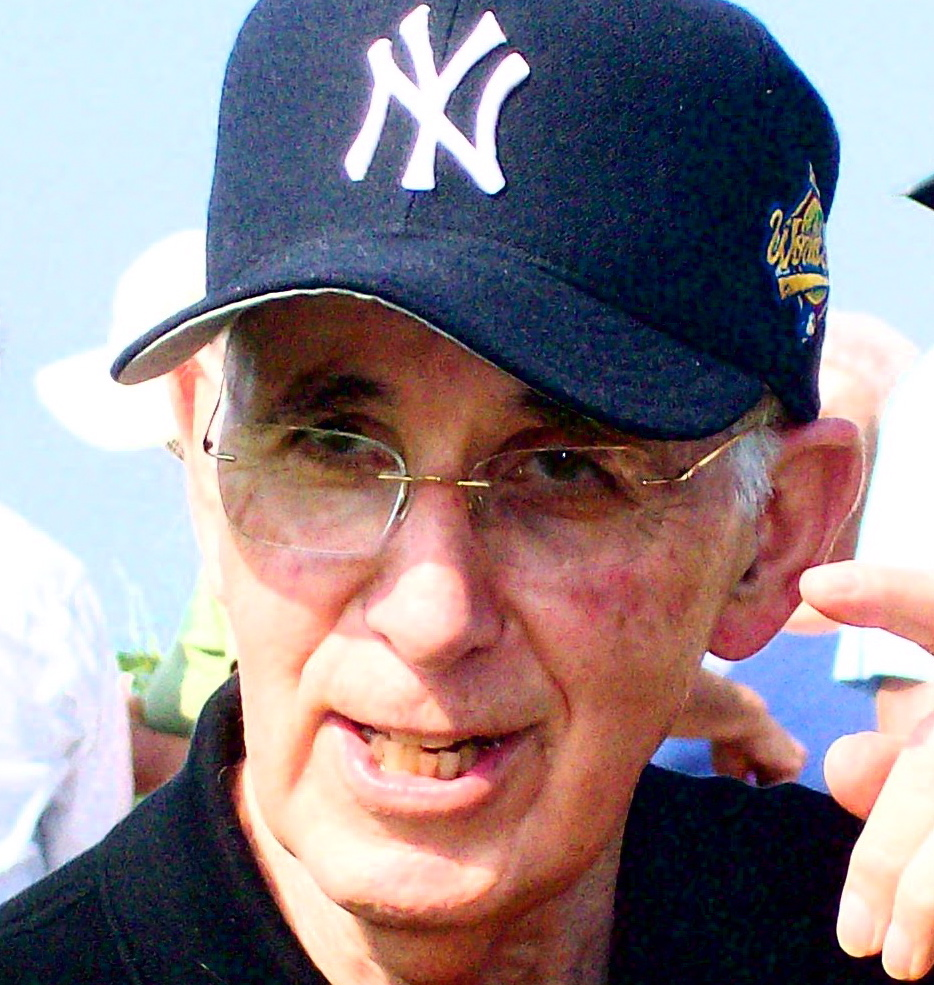
- Schwartz, July 2007
- Born: August 27, 1929; New Waterford, Nova Scotia, Canada
- Died: September 18, 2010 (aged 81); Sydney, Nova Scotia, Canada
- Education: Mount Allison University; New York University
- Occupation: Entrepreneur
- Years active: 1950–2010
- Organization: Canadian International Demining Corps
- Known for: Business and philanthropy
- Political party: Liberal Party of Canada
- Board member of: National Capital Commission; National Theatre School of Canada; Dalhousie University School of Business; Cape Breton Children's Aid Society
- Spouse: Diana Schwartz (née Usher) (1958–2010; his death)
- Children: 4

Irving Schwartz, OC (August 27, 1929 – September 18, 2010) was a Canadian businessman. He was a noted community leader, philanthropist, and humanitarian. He was inducted into the Order of Canada for his work towards ridding the world of landmines, and was later made an officer of the order.

== Early life ==
Schwartz was born in New Waterford, Nova Scotia to Abraham and Rose Schwartz, an Ashkenazi Jewish family originally from the Pale of Settlement. They had a small clothing store on Plummer Avenue, the town's main street. After completing grade 11 at Mount Carmel School, Schwartz left high school to attend courses at Mount Allison University and New York University. Upon his return to Cape Breton, in the early 1950s, he became a manager in his parents’ store. In 1955, at the age of 26, Schwartz became the president and general manager of Schwartz and Company. Over the next 30 years, he used this business as his base to go into other businesses and conduct philanthropic work.

== Business career ==
Starting in the 1960s, he began investing in business ventures outside of the furniture and clothing businesses. He branched out into long-term care, by opening his first nursing home in Sydney, Nova Scotia. This operation was amalgamated with a Calgary company to form VillaCentres Limited. The newly combined company built nine nursing homes across the country and controlled the Park Plaza Hotel, in downtown Toronto. In the 1970s, when Cape Breton's economy was starting to unravel, with the Sydney Steel Corporation shedding jobs, and the coal mines around Industrial Cape Breton being slowly shutdown by DEVCO, Schwartz tried to help Cape Breton's economy by investing in diverse businesses that were outside of the traditional heavy-industrial types that were the norm at the time, for example, seafood farming.

In 1976, he entered the cable television field by gaining a licence for the cable franchise in the Glace Bay and New Waterford areas, known as Seaside Cable TV Ltd (now known as Seaside Communications). With its sister company, Seaside High-Speed, it is currently providing high-speed wireless internet throughout the rural areas of eastern Nova Scotia.

== Philanthropic work ==
From an early age he was involved with New Waterford's volunteer fire department, and ran blood donation drives. He served as President of the Cape Breton Children's Aid Society, President of the Lions' Club, Chairman of the University College of Cape Breton, co-founder of Junior Achievement in Cape Breton, Director of the National Theatre School of Canada, advisory board member of the Dalhousie School of Business, and Chairman of the Cape Breton Chapter of the Hebrew University.

In the early 1990s, he co-founded the Canadian International Demining Corps (CIDC), a charitable, non-government organization supportive of an international ban on the production, stockpiling and deployment of anti-personnel landmines. Headquartered in Sydney, it has provided humanitarian mine deactivation services in Bosnia, Mozambique, Kosovo and Jordan. Schwartz was honoured with the Order of Canada in 1998 and was upgraded in rank to Officer of the Order of Canada in 2004.

== Later life ==
In 2003, he was inducted into the Nova Scotia Business Hall of Fame. Until his death on Yom Kippur, Saturday, September 18, 2010, he was active in both business and philanthropic endeavours, living in Sydney, with his wife of 52 years, Diana Schwartz (née Usher). He had four children and four grandchildren living in Canada and Great Britain at the time of his death.
