= Lindsay Thomas (actress) =

Canadian actress (1978–2010)

- Born: April 3, 1978
- Died: February 3, 2010 (aged 31)
- Education: Sheridan College
- Occupation: Actress
- Partner: Gareth Potter

Lindsay Thomas (April 3, 1978 – February 3, 2010) was a Canadian stage actress of Stratford, Ontario and Toronto theatre productions.

== Career ==
Thomas was a graduate of Sheridan College's musical theatre program. She was a member of the Stratford Festival company from 2005 to 2008. Her performances included playing Ado Annie in Oklahoma! in 2007. She was also a member of the original Canadian company of Hairspray. Her performances struck audiences, and her leadership abilities as a dance captain were outstanding. This especially showed through when she worked with and as a part of the cast of Oliver! in 2006 at the Stratford Festival of Canada.

In 2008, she played Gracie Shinn in The Music Man. She later performed in Anne of Green Gables – Somewhere in the World at Charlottetown Festival, Grease at Edmonton's Citadel Theatre, Aladdin at the Stirling Festival, The Boy Friend, City of Angels, and The Crucible at Theatre Sheridan. She also starred in the Canadian version of Jersey Boys along with Jeff Madden, who was a very close friend.

== Death ==
Lindsay Thomas was diagnosed with lung cancer in 2009, even though she was a non-smoker. She died on February 3, 2010, aged 31.
