= The Wedding Belles =

Canadian television series

The Wedding Belles is a Canadian lifestyle television series that airs primarily in British Columbia and Alberta on several Shaw Media channels. Launched in 2010, the series focused on Sarah Groundwater Law's engagement and wedding planning with bridesmaid and best friend, Aubrey Arnason. Since her marriage on June 28, 2011, the series looks at all types of matrimonial traditions and new ideas surrounding the multibillion-dollar industry. Each episode features a unique wedding idea for the viewer to pull inspiration from.

The Wedding Belles is produced and filmed in and around Vancouver, British Columbia. Some episodes were filmed abroad; the London segment featuring the marriage of Prince William and Kate Middleton as well as the wedding of Groundwater Law filmed in Tuscany, Italy. Arnason & Groundwater Law produce the series which airs on Shaw Television via The Express.

The show received its first Leo award in 2011 for Cinematography, awarded to Jon Fenster. The show also received two nominations: Best Lifestyle Series and Best Host(s), with Groundwater Law and Arnason as the duo.
