= Song Weigang =

Chinese water polo player

Personal information
- Nationality: Chinese
- Born: 5 May 1958 (age 68)

Chinese name
- Traditional Chinese: 宋為綱
- Simplified Chinese: 宋为纲
- Hanyu Pinyin: Sòng Wèigāng

Sport
- Sport: Water polo
Medal record
Men's water polo
Representing China
Asian Games
Gold medal – first place	1982 Delhi	Team competition

Song Weigang (born 5 May 1958) is a Chinese water polo player. He competed in the men's tournament at the 1984 Summer Olympics. He is from Zhanjiang.
