= Ray Beachey =

Canadian educator, historian and academic

Raymond Wendell Beachey (24 October 1915 – 10 July 2010) was a Canadian educator, historian and academic best known for his work at Makerere University in Uganda in the 1950s and 1960s. In this capacity he tutored many important African leaders including Benedicto Kiwanuka, Yusuf Lule and Mwai Kibaki, but was concerned that Uganda was not ready for independence at the time it was granted and saw the dictatorial regimes of Idi Amin and Milton Obote as the result of the haste with which the British withdrew from the country. He was also an historian of East Africa and published several important works on the subject.

== Life ==
Beachey was born in the town of Trout Creek, Ontario, and worked at logging camps to pay for his education before obtaining a job in finance in Ottawa and subsequently joining the Royal Canadian Air Force during the Second World War. After the war he married Ursula Malloy and returned to Canada, taking a degree at Queen's University in Ontario followed by a PhD in Imperial History at the University of Edinburgh.

On graduation, Beachey took a position lecturing at Makerere University in Kampala, where many of his students would later become government ministers in Uganda and Kenya. Among his colleagues at this time were V. S. Naipaul and Paul Theroux, the latter describing him as "the gentle Canadian". Beachey found his African students to be more dedicated than those he had taught in Canada, but following Ugandan independence in 1962 he became increasingly concerned that the country was unprepared for self-government and left in 1968. The murder of his former student Benedicto Kiwanuka and the ensuing brutal reigns of Idi Amin and Milton Obote strengthened his opinion - on one occasion a former colleague who had suffered torture at the hands of Obote's men begged him to work towards a return of British rule in the country.

After leaving Africa, Beachey held positions at King's College London and the University of Waterloo in Canada before retiring in Hampshire in 1978. He lived there for the rest of his life, dying in July 2010. As well as his university work, Beachey was an important historian of East Africa, publishing numerous reference works on the region. He was also a collector of Persian carpets and travelled extensively in the Middle East.

== Works ==
- The British West Indies Sugar Industry in the Late 19th Century, 1957
- The Slave Trade of Eastern Africa, 1976
- The Warrior Mullah, 1990
- A History of East Africa, 1592-1902, 1995
