= Bruce Garvey =

Canadian journalist and editor

- Born: Bruce Noble Garvey c. 17 October 1939; London, England
- Died: 1 August 2010 (aged 70); Wellington, Ontario, Canada
- Occupations: reporter, editor
- Spouse: Celia Wasbrough
- Children: Paul Garvey, Danny Garvey, Stephen Garvey, Andrea Bucic
- Relatives: Kyla Garvey (Grand Child), Megan Garvey (Grand Child), Colin Garvey (Grand Child) Alison McDevitt-Wilson (Grand Child), Kristen McDevitt (Grand Child)

Bruce Noble Garvey (c. 1939 – 1 August 2010) was a British-born Canadian journalist and editor.

Born in London, England, Garvey moved to Ontario, Canada at age 19 and worked at various newspapers such as the Stratford Beacon-Herald. After jobs at United Press International and the Montreal Gazette, he joined the Toronto Star in 1967 where he held various editorial and bureau chief positions and city editor. In 1977, he moved to broadcast journalism first with CBC Television where he became a producer for The Journal's documentaries. He later joined the news department at Global Television. He returned to print journalism in 1998 when he became the news editor for Ottawa Citizen's weekend editions, and became a columnist for the National Post.

In 1970, Garvey and Daily Express's Richard Killian were the only reporters present at NASA's Mission Control when the crew of Apollo 13 first reported the critical equipment failures which changed the lunar mission into a rescue operation.

In May 2009, Garvey was diagnosed with lung cancer and died in Wellington, Ontario on 1 August 2010.
