= Diane Virjee =

Canadian field hockey player

Diane Virjee née Mahy (born 20 January 1960 in Victoria, British Columbia) is a Canadian former field hockey player who competed in the 1984 Summer Olympics.
