= Narihito Taima =

Japanese water polo player

Personal information
- Born: January 15, 1961 (age 65)

Sport
- Sport: Water polo
Medal record
Representing Japan
Asian Games
Silver medal – second place	1982 New Delhi	Men's tournament

Narihito Taima (当麻 成人, Taima Narihito; born 15 January 1961) is a Japanese former water polo player who competed in the 1984 Summer Olympics.
