= Marie-Huguette Cormier =

Canadian fencer

Personal information
- Born: 18 May 1961 (age 65) Îles-de-la-Madeleine, Canada

Sport
- Sport: Fencing

Marie-Huguette Cormier (born 18 May 1961) is a Canadian fencer. She competed in the women's team foil events at the 1984 and 1988 Summer Olympics.
