= Tom Jones (volleyball) =

Canadian volleyball player (born 1956)

Personal information
- Nationality: Canadian
- Born: 12 November 1956 (age 68); New Westminster, British Columbia, Canada

Sport
- Sport: Volleyball

Tom Jones (born 12 November 1956) is a Canadian former volleyball player. He competed in the men's tournament at the 1984 Summer Olympics.
