= Alex Ketrzynski =

Canadian volleyball player (born 1960)

Personal information
- Born: 9 August 1960 (age 64); Toronto, Ontario, Canada

Sport
- Sport: Volleyball

Alex Ketrzynski (born 9 August 1960) is a Canadian volleyball player. He competed in the men's tournament at the 1984 Summer Olympics.
