= Gary Mittelholtz =

Canadian radio journalist

- Born: Gary Brian Mittelholtz; 28 May 1954; Toronto, Ontario, Canada
- Died: 14 March 2010 (aged 55); Goshen, New Brunswick
- Spouse: M. Teresa Bruce
- Presenting career
- Show: The Rolling Home Show
- Network: CBC Radio
- Show: Mainstreet
- Network: CBC Radio
- Country: Canada

Gary Brian Mittelholtz (28 May 1954 – 13 March 2010) was a Canadian radio journalist, known foremost for his work with CBC Radio in New Brunswick. His radio reporting won him a gold prize at the Atlantic Journalism Awards.

Mittelholtz was born in Toronto, Ontario where he received a Radio and Television Arts degree from Ryerson Polytechnical Institute in 1977. His broadcasting career was entirely with CBC Radio first in Toronto where he began following graduation, then at Thompson, Manitoba, finally New Brunswick where he was based with CBC in Saint John.

In April 2007, Mittelholtz began his Doing Stuff Outdoors blog and podcast.

In December 2008, he retired from CBC Radio and became owner of the River Valley News in the Grand Bay–Westfield area following the death of that newspaper's long-time owner Diane Bormke.

In March 2010, Mittelholtz was cross-country skiing in Goshen, in the Sussex, New Brunswick area, when he suffered a heart attack and died.
