= John Powles =

John Powles (1948 – March 14, 2010) was the Canadian president of the Canada-Japan Society and an important figure within Canadian-Japanese relations for more than 25 years.

John Mark Powles was born in Winnipeg, Manitoba, but moved to Yokohama, Japan, early in life. His father and grandfather were Anglican missionaries in Japan during the early 20th century. He spent 18 years living in several different Japanese cities.

He returned to Canada for college and earned a bachelor's degree from the University of British Columbia in Vancouver, British Columbia. Powles took several positions while working for the government of Canada in Japan, beginning with the Canadian pavilion at Expo '70 in Osaka. This led to a position with the Canadian Department of Expositions, in which Powles was responsible for all of Canada's international expositions.

Powles became the Director of Asia and Japan Operations for the Council of Forest Industries, based in Tokyo, in 1987. He also received the president of the Canadian Chamber of Commerce in Japan. The Japanese Ministry of Construction awarded Powles its first honor to a non-Japanese citizen.

British Columbia Premier Gordon Campbell appointed Powles as the head of the Japan Market Advisory Group within the Asia Pacific Trade Council in 2005.

Japanese Emperor Akihito named Powles as a recipient of the Order of the Rising Sun in 2008 for his contributions to bilateral relations between Japan and Canada.

John Powles died at Lions Gate Hospital in Vancouver on March 14, 2010, of pancreatic cancer at the age of 61.
