= Kip Hladky =

Canadian field hockey player

William Kipling "Kip" Hladky (born May 15, 1960) is a former field hockey player from Canada, who participated in the 1984 Summer Olympics in Los Angeles, California. There he finished in tenth place with the Men's National Team. He was born in Edmonton, Alberta, Canada.

== International senior competitions ==
- 1984 – Olympic Games, Los Angeles (10th)
- 1986 Men's Hockey World Cup, London (10th)
