= Chen Zhixiong =

Chinese water polo player (born 1959)

Personal information
- Nationality: Chinese
- Born: 13 August 1959 (age 66)

Sport
- Sport: Water polo
Medal record
Men's water polo
Representing China
Asian Games
Gold medal – first place	1982 Delhi	Team competition

Chen Zhixiong (born 13 August 1959) is a Chinese water polo player. He competed in the men's tournament at the 1984 Summer Olympics.
