= Julian Austin (field hockey) =

Canadian hockey player

Julian Austin (born December 30, 1949, in Georgetown, British Guiana) is a former field hockey player from Canada, who was member of the Men's National Team that finished in tenth position at the 1984 Summer Olympics in Los Angeles, California.

== Olympic career ==
Austin represented Canada in the World Cup of Field Hockey and two Pan American Games, helping the national team to win a silver medal and their first gold medal in that sport. The gold medal performance qualified Canada for the Olympic Games in Los Angeles in 1984. His contributions to Canadian athletics has earned him two Sports Excellence Awards from the Government of Canada: one in 1983 presented by former Prime Minister Pierre Elliot Trudeau and another in 1984 after the Olympics by former Prime Minister Brian Mulroney.

== Personal life ==
A policeman in his native Guyana before immigrating to Canada during the early 1970s, Austin has worked as a volunteer for his church in Scarborough, Ontario. As a young person he sat on many committees helping the youth and the elders of the Church. In the Scarborough Rough River area, where he still lives, he served as a member of the Old Lansing Cut-off Ratepayers Association responsible for the community youth program.

Austin has a wife, Laurel, as well as a son and a daughter. He is the former Vice-president and Assistant Welfare Officer of the Guyana Ex-Police Association of Canada, who was responsible for fund raising and event planning. His favourite saying is: "If I can help somebody as I pass along, then my living would not be in vain."

Julian joined the Malvern Onyx Lions Club in its charter year and served as tail twister, membership director, and eventually President from 2009-2011.

Austin is a facilitator on the Global Leadership Team of the Lions Clubs International in his district.

== International senior competitions ==
- 1979 - Pan American Games, Puerto Rico (Silver)
- 1983 - Pan American Games, Venezuela (Gold)
- 1984 - Olympic Games, Los Angeles (10th)
