= Shingo Kai =

Japanese water polo player

Personal information
- Born: January 8, 1963 (age 63)

Sport
- Sport: Water polo
Medal record
Representing Japan
Asian Games
Silver medal – second place	1982 New Delhi	Men's tournament

Shingo Kai (甲斐 真吾, Kai Shingo; born 8 January 1963) is a Japanese former water polo player who competed in the 1984 Summer Olympics.
