= Karen Hewlett =

Canadian field hockey player

Karen Hewlett (born 4 October 1959, in Toronto) is a Canadian former field hockey player who competed in the 1984 Summer Olympics.
