= Bill Meyer (water polo) =

Canadian water polo player (born 1958)

Personal information
- Born: November 4, 1958 (age 66)

Sport
- Sport: Water polo

Bill Meyer (born 4 November 1958) is a Canadian former water polo player. Meyer was a member of the Canadian water polo team at the 1984 Summer Olympics.

According to Carleton University student newspaper The Charlatan, Meyer was a coach for Carleton water polo teams in the 1990s, but came out of retirement to complete his degree and play games for the Ravens in 2014.

== Highlights ==
Olympic Swimming Performance
1984 Los Angeles	Aquatics - Water Polo	Men	10
