= Bernard Volz =

Canadian swimmer

Personal information
- Born: 30 July 1968 (age 57) North York, Ontario, Canada

Sport
- Sport: Swimming

Bernard Volz (born 30 July 1968) is a Canadian former swimmer. He competed in the men's 1500 metre freestyle at the 1984 Summer Olympics.
