= Yoshifumi Saito =

Japanese water polo player

Personal information
- Born: October 1, 1958 (age 67)

Sport
- Sport: Water polo
Medal record
Representing Japan
Asian Games
Silver medal – second place	1982 New Delhi	Team competition

Yoshifumi Saito (斉藤 好史, Saitō Yoshifumi; born 1 October 1958) is a Japanese former water polo player who competed in the 1984 Summer Olympics.
