= Pan Shenghua =

Chinese water polo player

Personal information
- Nationality: Chinese
- Born: 3 March 1957 (age 69)

Sport
- Sport: Water polo
Medal record
Men's water polo
Representing China
Asian Games
| Gold medal – first place | 1982 Delhi | Team competition |

Pan Shenghua (born 3 March 1957) is a Chinese water polo player, and coach. He competed in the men's tournament at the 1984 Summer Olympics.

He was assistant coach at the 2008 Summer Olympics, and 2012 Summer Olympics. He was coach of the Chinese women's team, at the Water polo at the 2005 World Aquatics Championships, and Water polo at the 2007 World Aquatics Championships.
