= Daisuke Houki =

Japanese water polo player

Personal information
- Born: March 7, 1961 (age 65)

Sport
- Sport: Water polo
Medal record
Representing Japan
Asian Games
Silver medal – second place	1982 New Delhi	Men's tournament

Daisuke Houki (宝亀 大輔, Hōki Daisuke; born 7 March 1961) is a Japanese former water polo player who competed in the 1984 Summer Olympics.
