= Randy Wagner =

Canadian volleyball player (born 1959)

Personal information
- Nationality: Canadian
- Born: 29 December 1959 (age 65); Prince George, British Columbia, Canada

Sport
- Sport: Volleyball

Randy Wagner (born 29 December 1959) is a Canadian volleyball player. He competed in the men's tournament at the 1984 Summer Olympics.
