= Alain Masson =

Canadian cyclist and cross-country skier

Personal information
- Born: 25 March 1961 (age 65) Laval, Quebec, Canada

Cycling career
- Sport: Cycling

Alain Masson (born 25 March 1961) is a Canadian former cyclist and cross-country skier who competed in the 1984 Summer Olympics, in the 1988 Winter Olympics, and in the 1992 Winter Olympics.

== Personal life ==
Alain coached for the Yukon Ski Team as head coach. He also worked for the Canadian National Ski Team as a wax tech. Alain has two son's Sasha and Felix.
