= Jean Charpentier =

Canadian journalist (1935–2010)

- Born: May 14, 1935; Ottawa, Ontario, Canada
- Died: January 8, 2010 (aged 74); Ottawa, Ontario, Canada
- Other name: The Count
- Occupation: Journalism
- Spouse: Mary Mackay (m.1990)

Jean Charpentier (May 14, 1935 – January 8, 2010) was a Canadian journalist who served as the press secretary for Pierre Trudeau, the Prime Minister of Canada, from 1975 until 1979. He was nicknamed "The Count" by journalists and reporters for his "elegance" and manners.

== Biography ==
=== Early life ===
Charpentier was born on May 14, 1935, in Ottawa, Ontario, Canada, the second youngest of his father, Fulgence Charpentier's, six children. Fulgence Charpentier had his four eldest children with his first wife, who died. Fulgence remarried to his second wife, Louise Dionne, shortly afterwards. The couple had their two youngest children, including Jean Charpentier. Fulgence Charpentier, who had worked as a journalist covering the Parliament of Canada, was the acting Mayor of Ottawa at the time of Jean Charpentier's birth.

Fulgence Charpentier worked for the Canadian federal government as a diplomat and wartime censorship director during World War II. His father was posted to the Canadian embassy in Paris, under Georges Vanier in 1948, and was the first Ambassador to African francophonie, based in Cameroon, beginning in the 1960s. Fulgence Charpentier died in 2001.

=== Journalism career ===
Jean Charpentier learned Spanish in 1953 while his father was posted at the Canadian embassy in Uruguay. In the 1950s, Charpentier began working as a journalist for two French-language Canadian newspapers, Le Devoir and Le Droit. A colleague at the Le Droit, Denis Gratton, coined Charpentier's nickname, "The Count," while working at the newspaper, for his courtesy and manners.

He became a television reporter for Radio-Canada, the French-language broadcaster for the CBC, in 1961, where he reported from Paris, London, Toronto and Lima, Cambodia, Vietnam, Argentina and Nigeria's breakaway region of Biafra. Charpentier covered the October Crisis in Quebec in 1970. He became the first foreign journalist to interview Augusto Pinochet following the 1973 Chilean coup d'état which overthrew Salvador Allende.

Charpentier left television journalism in the 1970s. His family had connections to then Prime Minister Trudeau through his father and two brothers, who were all diplomats in the Department of Foreign Affairs and International Trade. Charpentier would serve as Pierre Trudeau's press secretary from 1975 until 1979.

=== Trudeau's press secretary ===
Charpentier became Trudeau's press secretary at a time of increased friction between the Prime Minister and the Canadian media. Trudeau severely disliked the press corps, who had developed a reputation for confronting parliamentarians in the hallways of Parliament with difficult questions.

The Prime Minister's communication director, Richard O'Hagan, moved Trudeau's press conferences to the Government Conference Centre to better fit the Prime Minister's image.

As press secretary, Charpentier headed the Prime Minister's press conferences at the Conference Centre. He won the respect of the press corps by balancing the competing interests of the print and broadcast media, and, more importantly, the French and English-speaking reporters. He made sure that the same number of French speaking reporters from Quebec were called upon as the larger English-speaker contingent of reporters.

It is believed that Charpentier had Trudeau write a public letter announcing his separation from his wife, Margaret Trudeau, in 1977, declaring the marital problems as a private matter.

=== Later life ===
In 1979, Trudeau's government was ended by the opposition Progressive Conservatives, led by Joe Clark. Charpentier became a communications consultant at the Treasury Board.

The Canadian government asked Charpentier to arrange the official papal visit by Pope John Paul II to the country.

He spent the rest of his career as a freelance translator. In 1990, he married Mary Mackay.

Jean Charpentier died from cancer on January 8, 2010, in Ottawa at the age of 74. He was survived by his wife, Mary Mackay, and her four children, Tina, Dwayne, Shawn and Derek. He was survived by three siblings - Claire, Louise and Jacques - and predeceased by two brothers, Pierre and Georges.
