= Simon Deschamps =

Canadian water polo player (born 1962)

Personal information
- Born: 7 May 1962 (age 63); Quebec City, Quebec, Canada

Sport
- Sport: Water polo

Simon Deschamps (born 7 May 1962) is a Canadian water polo player. He competed in the men's tournament at the 1984 Summer Olympics.
