= Sylvain Huet =

Canadian water polo player (born 1960)

Personal information
- Born: 20 October 1960 (age 64); Montreal, Quebec, Canada

Sport
- Sport: Water polo

Sylvain Huet (born 20 October 1960) is a Canadian water polo player. He competed in the men's tournament at the 1984 Summer Olympics.
