= Brian Collyer =

Canadian water polo player (born 1961)

Personal information
- Born: 12 July 1961 (age 63); Sarnia, Ontario, Canada

Sport
- Sport: Water polo

Brian Collyer (born 12 July 1961) is a Canadian water polo player. He competed in the men's tournament at the 1984 Summer Olympics.
