= Toshio Fukumoto =

Japanese water polo player

Personal information
- Born: November 11, 1960 (age 65)

Sport
- Sport: Water polo
Medal record
Representing Japan
Asian Games
Silver medal – second place	1982 New Delhi	Men's tournament

Toshio Fukumoto (福元 寿夫, Fukumoto Toshio; born 11 November 1960) is a Japanese former water polo player who competed in the 1984 Summer Olympics.
