= John Mykkanen =

American swimmer

Personal information
- Full name: John Cary Mykkanen
- National team: United States
- Born: September 8, 1966 (age 59) Anaheim, California
- Height: 5 ft 11 in (1.80 m)
- Weight: 146 lb (66 kg)
- Spouse: Joanna

Sport
- Sport: Swimming
- Strokes: Freestyle, distance
- Club: Irvine Novaquatics
- College team: U. California, Berkeley
- Coach: Flip Darr (Novaquatics); Nort Thornton (Cal Berkeley)
Medal record
Men's swimming
Representing the United States
Olympic Games
Silver medal – second place	1984 Los Angeles	400 m freestyle
Summer Universiade
Silver medal – second place	1985 Kobe	400 m freestyle

John Cary Mykkanen (born September 8, 1966) is an American former competition swimmer who swam for the Irvine Novaquatics and the University of California at Berkeley and won the silver medal in the men's 400-meter freestyle event at the 1984 Summer Olympics in Los Angeles, California. He later worked as a chiropractor in Orange County, California.

== Early life and swimming ==
Mykkanen was born in Irvine, California, on September 8, 1966, and started swimming at the age of 5 at the Placentia YMCA. Mykkanen swam for Placentia's El Dorado High School, where as a Senior in Los Angeles on May 12, 1984, he won the California Interscholastic Federation 3-A Championship in the 200 freestyle with a time of 1:39.51, and the 500 freestyle championship with a time of 4:25.62, leading El Dorado to a second place in the team standings. Mykkanen's coach at El Dorado, Tom Milich was named 1987 California Swimming Coach of the Year, and was selected as a Distinguished Coach of the Year by the American Swimming Coaches Association eleven times. Anticipating the Olympic trials as a Senior in 1984, Mykkanen swam seven days a week, with a ninety minute workout in the morning and a 2 1/2 hour workout in the evening Monday through Friday.

Mykkanen also trained intensely with the Irvine Novaquatics, an exceptional program where he was directed by International Swimming Hall of Fame Coach Flip Darr. In the summer of his Senior year, he swam a 3:58.83 in the 400-meter freestyle, taking first place at the Industry Hills World Invitational Swimming Meet on July 23, 1984.

== 1984 L.A. Olympic Silver ==
Rated in the top five in the world in both events, Mykkanen tried out for the 400 and 1500-meter freestyle at the June–July 1984 Olympic trials in Indianapolis. In the 400-freestyle Olympic Trial finals, he swam a 3:51.44, qualifying easily, though he took a second place to rival George DiCarlo of Denver, who swam a 3:51.03, a new American record. Mykkanen did not qualify in the 1500-meter event, as he placed ninth with a time of 15:33.12, and only the top eight finishers made the final cut.

After graduating from High School, Mykkanen won the Silver medal in the 1984 Olympics Men's 400-meter finals with a time of 3:51.49. At 17, Mykannen was the youngest male swimmer on the U.S. Olympic team that year. The top three swimmers for Mykkanen's 400-meter free had an extremely close finish. Mykkanen finished a close second to George DiCarlo who took the gold with a time of 3:51.23, only around a quarter of a second before Mykkanen. Justin Lemberg of Australia, who placed third taking the bronze, finished only .3 seconds behind Mykannen. At the 1984 Olympics, the U.S. Men's Olympic swimming coach was Don Gambril.

Mykkanen set the American record for the 800-meter freestyle of 7:58.24 on August 4, 1986.

Mykkanen tried out for the 1988 Olympic trials in Austin, Texas in the 200-meter freestyle but placed 18th with a time of 1:51.14, and did not make the team.

== University of California at Berkeley ==
After the Olympics, he enrolled at University of California at Berkeley under International Swimming Hall of Fame head coach Nort Thornton from around 1984-1988, and swam with the team. Coach Thornton pioneered recruitment of international athletes, and was known for embracing new technology and methodologies. The U. Cal Berkeley team won NCAA Championships in 1979 and 1980, prior to Mykkanen's enrollment, though they continued to be rated in the top ten most years under Thornton's tenure.

As a U. California sophomore, he placed second in the 400-meter free with a time of 3:52.40, at the Pan Pacific Swimming Championships in Tokyo in August, 1985. At the U.S. Swimming Championships on August 4, 1986, in Santa Clara California, Mykkanen placed second in the 800 freestyle with 8:03.1, in a close race with South African Gary Brinkman who took first, despite Mykkanen having held the American record in the event two years earlier.

== Later life ==
Mykkanen later became an Orange County, California chiropractor in Tustin, California. His wife Joanna, also a U. Cal Berkeley graduate, and former swimmer, has coached developmental swimmers at Irvine Novaquatics and John has spent some time as an Assistant Coach. Three of Mykkanen's children have swum with Novaquatics, including his daughter, Courtney, an outstanding swimmer who participated at the 2014 Youth Olympic Games and the 2012 US Olympic Trials, and was an accomplished swimmer for U. Cal Berkeley.

== See also ==
- List of Olympic medalists in swimming (men)
