= Geoff Brown (water polo) =

Canadian water polo player (born 1955)

Personal information
- Born: 16 June 1955 (age 69); Toronto, Ontario, Canada

Sport
- Sport: Water polo

Geoff Brown (born 16 June 1955) is a Canadian water polo player. He competed in the men's tournament at the 1984 Summer Olympics.
