= René Bol =

Canadian water polo player (born 1956)

Personal information
- Nationality: Canadian
- Born: 5 July 1956 (age 69) Wellington, New Zealand

Sport
- Sport: Water polo

René Bol (born 5 July 1956) is a Canadian water polo player. He competed in the men's tournament at the 1984 Summer Olympics.
