= Alexander Juhasz =

Canadian water polo player (born 1958)

Personal information
- Born: 8 March 1958 (age 67); Windsor, Ontario, Canada

Sport
- Sport: Water polo

Alexander Juhasz (born 8 March 1958) is a Canadian water polo player. He competed in the men's tournament at the 1984 Summer Olympics.
