= Gordon Van Tol =

Canadian water polo player (1960–2010)

Personal information
- Born: February 22, 1960
- Died: January 11, 2010 (aged 49)

Sport
- Sport: Water polo

Gordon Van Tol (February 22, 1960 – January 11, 2010) was a Canadian water polo player.

Van Tol played for the Canadian national water polo team in the 1984 Summer Olympics, scoring one goal. He also played in the 1983 Pan American Games.

He died at the age of 49 from a heart attack on January 11, 2010.
