= David Shemilt =

Canadian swimmer

Personal information
- Born: 22 August 1964 (age 61) Toronto, Ontario, Canada

Sport
- Sport: Swimming
Medal record
Representing Canada
Summer Universiade
Bronze medal – third place	1983 Edmonton	4x200m freestyle relay

David Shemilt (born 22 August 1964) is a Canadian swimmer. He competed in two events at the 1984 Summer Olympics.
