= Cycling at the 1984 Summer Olympics =

Cycling at the Games of the XXIII Olympiad
- Venues: Artesia Freeway, Streets of Mission Viejo; Olympic Velodrome
- Date: July 29–August 3, 1984
- Competitors: 359 from 54 nations

The cycling competition at the 1984 Summer Olympics in Los Angeles consisted of three road cycling events and five track cycling events. For the first time, women's cycling events were included in the Olympic program. Also newly introduced in these Games was the men's points race event.

== Road cycling ==
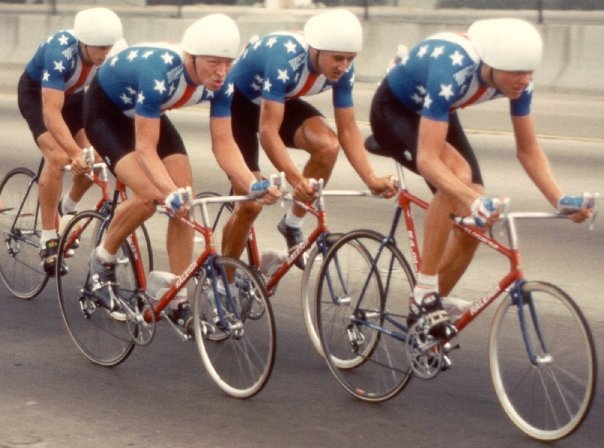
Men's team time trial (Team USA)

=== Men's events ===
Games	Gold	Silver	Bronze
Road race	Alexi Grewal; United States	Steve Bauer; Canada	Dag Otto Lauritzen; Norway
Team time trial	Italy; Marcello Bartalini; Marco Giovannetti; Eros Poli; Claudio Vandelli	Switzerland; Alfred Achermann; Richard Trinkler; Laurent Vial; Benno Wiss	United States; Ron Kiefel; Clarence Knickman; Davis Phinney; Andrew Weaver

=== Women's events ===
Games	Gold	Silver	Bronze
Road race	Connie Carpenter; United States	Rebecca Twigg; United States	Sandra Schumacher; West Germany

== Track cycling ==
Games	Gold	Silver	Bronze
Points race	Roger Ilegems; Belgium	Uwe Messerschmidt; West Germany	José Youshimatz; Mexico
Pursuit, individual	Steve Hegg; United States	Rolf Gölz; West Germany	Leonard Nitz; United States
Pursuit, team	Australia; Michael Grenda; Kevin Nichols; Michael Turtur; Dean Woods	United States; David Grylls; Steve Hegg; Patrick McDonough; Leonard Nitz; Brent Emery	West Germany; Reinhard Alber; Rolf Gölz; Roland Günther; Michael Marx
Sprint	Mark Gorski; United States	Nelson Vails; United States	Tsutomu Sakamoto; Japan
1 km time trial	Fredy Schmidtke; West Germany	Curt Harnett; Canada	Fabrice Colas; France

== Participating nations ==
359 cyclists from 54 nations competed.

- Antigua and Barbuda (3)
- Argentina (8)
- Australia (12)
- Austria (9)
- Barbados (1)
- Belgium (8)
- Belize (6)
- Bermuda (3)
- Brazil (7)
- Cameroon (5)
- Canada (13)
- Cayman Islands (6)
- Chile (7)
- China (7)

- Chinese Taipei (2)
- Colombia (7)
- Cyprus (1)
- Denmark (13)
- Fiji (1)
- Finland (5)
- France (17)
- Great Britain (16)
- Greece (2)
- Guatemala (1)
- Guyana (3)
- Hong Kong (4)
- Ireland (5)

- Italy (21)
- Jamaica (5)
- Japan (9)
- Lebanon (1)
- Malaysia (1)
- Malawi (4)
- Mexico (8)
- Morocco (4)
- Netherlands (16)
- New Zealand (7)
- Norway (10)
- Peru (1)
- Philippines (4)
- Puerto Rico (1)

- San Marino (1)
- Saudi Arabia (6)
- South Korea (10)
- Spain (4)
- Sweden (11)
- Switzerland (12)
- Trinidad and Tobago (1)
- Uganda (2)
- Uruguay (1)
- United States (20)
- Venezuela (2)
- West Germany (20)
- Yugoslavia (6)

== Medal table ==
Rank	Nation	Gold	Silver	Bronze	Total
1	United States	4	3	2	9
2	West Germany	1	2	2	5
3	Australia	1	0	0	1
3	Belgium	1	0	0	1
3	Italy	1	0	0	1
6	Canada	0	2	0	2
7	Switzerland	0	1	0	1
8	France	0	0	1	1
8	Japan	0	0	1	1
8	Mexico	0	0	1	1
8	Norway	0	0	1	1
Totals (11 entries)		8	8	8	24

== See also ==
- Cycling at the Friendship Games
