= France at the 1984 Summer Olympics =

- IOC code: FRA
- NOC: French National Olympic and Sports Committee

in Los Angeles
- Competitors: 238 (189 men and 49 women) in 21 sports
- Flag bearer: Angelo Parisi
- Medals Ranked 12th: Gold 5 Silver 7 Bronze 16 Total 28

Summer Olympics appearances (overview)
- 1896; 1900; 1904; 1908; 1912; 1920; 1924; 1928; 1932; 1936; 1948; 1952; 1956; 1960; 1964; 1968; 1972; 1976; 1980; 1984; 1988; 1992; 1996; 2000; 2004; 2008; 2012; 2016; 2020; 2024

Other related appearances
- 1906 Intercalated Games

France competed at the 1984 Summer Olympics in Los Angeles, United States. 238 competitors, 189 men and 49 women, took part in 139 events in 21 sports.

== Medalists ==
Medal	Name	Sport	Event	Date
Gold	Philippe Heberle	Shooting	Men's 10 metre air rifle	3 August
Gold	Jean-François Lamour	Fencing	Men's sabre	4 August
Gold	Philippe Boisse	Fencing	Men's épée	8 August
Gold	Pierre Quinon	Athletics	Men's pole vault	8 August
Gold	France Olympic football team: Albert Rust; William Ayache; Michel Bibard; Dominique Bijotat; François Brisson; Patrick Cubaynes; Patrice Garande; Philippe Jeannol; Guy Lacombe; Jean-Claude Lemoult; Jean-Philippe Rohr; Didier Sénac; Jean-Christophe Thouvenel; José Touré; Daniel Xuereb; Jean-Louis Zanon	Football	Men's tournament	11 August
Silver	Michel Bury	Shooting	Men's 50 metre rifle prone	30 July
Silver	Frédéric Delcourt	Swimming	Men's 200 metre backstroke	31 July
Silver	Philippe Delrieu; Franck Ducheix; Hervé Granger-Veyron; Pierre Guichot; Jean-François Lamour	Fencing	Men's team sabre	9 August
Silver	Joseph Mahmoud	Athletics	Men's 3000 metres steeplechase	10 August
Silver	Angelo Parisi	Judo	Men's +95 kg	10 August
Silver	Bernard Brégeon; Patrick Lefoulon	Canoeing	Men's K-2 1000 metres	11 August
Silver	Philippe Boisse; Jean-Michel Henry; Olivier Lenglet; Philippe Riboud; Michel Salesse	Fencing	Men's team épée	11 August
Bronze	Fabrice Colas	Cycling	Men's 1 km time trial	30 July
Bronze	Didier Boubé; Joël Bouzou; Paul Four	Modern pentathlon	Men's team	1 August
Bronze	Catherine Poirot	Swimming	Women's 100 metre breaststroke	2 August
Bronze	Philippe Vatuone	Gymnastics	Men's floor	4 August
Bronze	Marc Cerboni; Patrick Groc; Pascal Jolyot; Philippe Omnès; Frédéric Pietruszka	Fencing	Men's team foil	5 August
Bronze	Marc Alexandre	Judo	Men's 65 kg	5 August
Bronze	Véronique Brouquier; Brigitte Gaudin; Anne Meygret; Laurence Modaine; Pascale Trinquet-Hachin	Fencing	Women's team foil	7 August
Bronze	Michel Nowak	Judo	Men's 78 kg	7 August
Bronze	Philippe Riboud	Fencing	Men's épée	8 August
Bronze	Thierry Vigneron	Athletics	Men's pole vault	8 August
Bronze	Christophe Tiozzo	Boxing	Men's light-middleweight	9 August
Bronze	Bernard Brégeon	Canoeing	Men's K-1 500 metres	10 August
Bronze	Michèle Chardonnet	Athletics	Women's 100 metres hurdles	10 August
Bronze	Didier Hoyer; Éric Renaud	Canoeing	Men's C-2 1000 metres	11 August
Bronze	François Barouh; Philippe Boccara; Pascal Boucherit; Didier Vavasseur	Canoeing	Men's K-4 1000 metres	11 August

== Archery ==
After not competing in archery in 1980, France returned to the sport in 1984 with two male competitors.

Men's Individual Competition:

- Gerard Douis – 2485 points (→ 17th place)
- Philippe Loyen – 2411 points (→ 35th place)

== Athletics ==
Men's Competition

Men's 400 metres

- Aldo Canti
  - Heat — 46.14
  - Quarterfinals — 45.64
  - Semifinals — 45.59 (→ did not advance)
- Yann Quentrec
  - Heat — 46.94 (→ did not advance)
- Hector LLatser
  - Heat — 47.30 (→ did not advance)

Men's Marathon

- Alain Lazare
  - Final — 2:17:52 (→ 28th place)
- Jacky Boxberger
  - Final — 2:22:00 (→ 42nd place)

Men's High Jump

- Franck Verzy
  - Qualification — 2.15m (→ did not advance)

Men's Javelin Throw

- Jean-Paul Lakafia
  - Qualification — 80.52m
  - Final — 70.86m (→ 12th place)

Men's Pole Vault

- Pierre Quinon
  - Qualifying Round — 5.35m
  - Final — 5.75m (→ Gold Medal)
- Thierry Vigneron
  - Qualifying Round — 5.40m
  - Final — 5.60m (→ Bronze Medal)
- Serge Ferreira
  - Qualifying Round — 5.30m
  - Final — no mark (→ no ranking)

Men's Hammer Throw

- Walter Ciofani
  - Qualification — 73.10m
  - Final — 73.46m (→ 7th place)

Men's Decathlon

- William Motti
  - Final Result — 8266 points (→ 5th place)

Men's 20 km Walk

- Gérard Lelièvre
  - Final — 1:27:50 (→ 15th place)
- Martial Fesselier
  - Final — 1:29:46 (→ 20th place)
- Dominique Guebey
  - Final — did not start (→ no ranking)

Men's 50 km Walk

- Dominique Guebey
  - Final — 4:13:34 (→ 12th place)
- Gérard Lelièvre
  - Final — DNF (→ no ranking)

Women's Competition

Women's 3.000 metres

- Annette Sergent
  - Heat — 9.15.82 (→ did not advance)

Women's High Jump

- Maryse Ewanjé-Epée
  - Qualification — 1.90m
  - Final — 1.94m (→ 4th place)
- Brigitte Rougeron
  - Qualification — 1.84m (→ did not advance, 20th place)

Women's Heptathlon

- Florence Picaut
  - Final Result — 5914 points (→ 13th place)
- Chantal Beaugeant
  - Final Result — did not finish (→ no ranking)

== Basketball ==
Men's team competition

- Preliminary round (group B)
  - Lost to Uruguay (87-91)
  - Lost to PR China (83-85)
  - Lost to Spain (82-97)
  - Lost to United States (62-120)
  - Lost to Canada (69-96)
- Classification Matches
  - 9th/12th place: Lost to Brazil (86-100)
  - 11th/12th place: Defeated Egypt (102-78) → Eleventh place
- Team roster
  - Grégor Beugnot
  - Jean Michel Senegal
  - Richard Dacoury
  - Jacques Monclar
  - Philippe Szanyiel
  - Stéphane Ostrowski
  - Jean-Luc Deganis
  - Hervé Dubuisson
  - Patrick Cham
  - Bangaly Kaba
  - Éric Beugnot
  - Georges Vestris

== Boxing ==
Men's Bantamweight (– 54 kg)

- Louis Gomis
  - First Round — Bye
  - Second Round — Defeated Stefan Gertel (West Germany), retired in the second round
  - Third Round — Lost to Ndaba Dube (Zimbabwe), 0-5

Men's Middleweight (– 75 kg)

- Vincent Sarnelli
  - First Round – Bye
  - Second Round – Lost to Moses Mwaba (Zambia), after knock-out in first round

== Cycling ==
Seventeen cyclists, thirteen men and four women, represented France in 1984. Fabrice Colas won a bronze medal in the 1000m time trial.

Men's individual road race

- Daniel Amardeilh
- Philippe Bouvatier
- Claude Carlin
- Denis Pelizzari

Team time trial

- Jean-François Bernard
- Philippe Bouvatier
- Thierry Marie
- Denis Pelizzari

Sprint

- Philippe Vernet
- Franck Dépine

1000m time trial

- Fabrice Colas

Individual pursuit

- Pascal Robert
- Éric Louvel

Team pursuit

- Didier Garcia
- Éric Louvel
- Pascal Potié
- Pascal Robert

Points race

- Didier Garcia
- Éric Louvel

Women's individual road race

- Jeannie Longo — 2:12:35 (→ 6th place)
- Cécile Odin — 2:13:28 (→ 11th place)
- Dominique Damiani — 2:13:28 (→ 14th place)
- Marielle Guichard

== Fencing ==
20 fencers, 15 men and 5 women, represented France in 1984.

Men's foil

- Frédéric Pietruszka
- Philippe Omnès
- Pascal Jolyot

Men's team foil

- Frédéric Pietruszka, Pascal Jolyot, Patrick Groc, Philippe Omnès, Marc Cerboni

Men's épée

- Philippe Boisse
- Philippe Riboud
- Olivier Lenglet

Men's team épée

- Philippe Boisse, Jean-Michel Henry, Olivier Lenglet, Philippe Riboud, Michel Salesse

Men's sabre

- Jean-François Lamour
- Hervé Granger-Veyron
- Pierre Guichot

Men's team sabre

- Jean-François Lamour, Pierre Guichot, Hervé Granger-Veyron, Philippe Delrieu, Franck Ducheix

Women's foil

- Véronique Brouquier
- Laurence Modaine-Cessac
- Brigitte Latrille-Gaudin

Women's team foil

- Laurence Modaine-Cessac, Pascale Trinquet-Hachin, Brigitte Latrille-Gaudin, Véronique Brouquier, Anne Meygret

== Football ==
Men's team competition

- Preliminary round (group A)
  - France – Qatar 2-2
  - France – Norway 2-1
  - France – Chile 1-1
- Quarterfinal
  - France – Egypt 2-0
- Semifinal
  - France – Yugoslavia 4-2 [After extra time]
- Final
  - France – Brazil 2-0
- Team roster
  - ( 1.) Albert Rust
  - ( 2.) William Ayache
  - ( 3.) Michel Bibard
  - ( 4.) Dominique Bijotat
  - ( 5.) François Brisson
  - ( 6.) Patrick Cubaynes
  - ( 7.) Patrice Garande
  - ( 8.) Philippe Jeannol
  - ( 9.) Guy Lacombe
  - (10.) Jean-Claude Lemoult
  - (11.) Jean-Philippe Rohr
  - (12.) Didier Sénac
  - (13.) Jean-Christophe Thouvenel
  - (14.) José Touré
  - (15.) Daniel Xuereb
  - (16.) Jean-Louis Zanon
  - (17.) Michel Bensoussan
- Head coach: Henri Michel

== Modern pentathlon ==
Three male pentathletes represented France in 1984. They won bronze in the team event.

Individual

- Paul Four
- Didier Boubé
- Joël Bouzou

Team

- Paul Four
- Didier Boubé
- Joël Bouzou

== Swimming ==
Men's 100m Freestyle

- Stéphan Caron
  - Heat — 51.13
  - Final — 50.70 (→ 6th place)

Men's 400m Freestyle

- Franck Iacono
  - Heat — 3:55.07
  - Final — 3:54.58 (→ 5th place)

Men's 1500m Freestyle

- Franck Iacono
  - Heat — 15:27.27
  - Final — 15:26.96 (→ 5th place)

Men's 100m Backstroke

- Frédéric Delcourt
  - Heat — 58.22
  - B-Final — DSQ (→ no ranking)

Men's 200m Backstroke

- Frédéric Delcourt
  - Heat — 2:02.59
  - Final — 2:01.75 (→ Silver Medal)

Men's 200m Breaststroke

- Thierry Pata
  - Heat — 2:20.14
  - B-Final — 2:20.05 (→ 10th place)
- Christophe Deneuville
  - Heat — 2:24.54 (→ did not advance, 21st place)

Men's 4 × 100 m Freestyle Relay

- Stéphan Caron, Laurent Neuville, Dominique Bataille, and Bruno Lesaffre
  - Heat — 3:24.68
  - Final — 3:24.63 (→ 6th place)

Men's 4 × 200 m Freestyle Relay

- Pierre Andraca, Dominique Bataille, Michel Pou, and Stéphan Caron
  - Heat — 7:27.40
- Stéphan Caron, Dominique Bataille, Michel Pou, and Pierre Andraca
  - Final — 7:30.16 (→ 8th place)

Men's 4 × 100 m Medley Relay

- Frédéric Delcourt, Thierry Pata, Xavier Savin, and Stéphan Caron
  - Heat — 3:50.75 (→ did not advance, 10th place)

Women's 100m Freestyle

- Sophie Kamoun
  - Heat — 57.49
  - B-Final — 57.81 (→ 13th place)

Women's 200m Freestyle

- Laurence Bensimon
  - Heat — 2:06.01 (→ did not advance, 19th place)

Women's 800m Freestyle

- Laurence Bensimon
  - Heat — 9:01.75 (→ did not advance, 15th place)

Women's 200m Individual Medley

- Laurence Bensimon
  - Heat — 2:24.34
  - B-Final — 2:27.13 (→ 16th place)

Women's 4 × 100 m Freestyle Relay

- Sophie Kamoun, Caroline Amoric, Laurence Bensimon, and Veronique Jardin
  - Heat — 3:52.67
  - Final — 3:52.15 (→ 8th place)
