= Cycling at the 1984 Summer Olympics – Men's team pursuit =

Cycling - Men's team pursuit at the Games of the XXIII Olympiad
- Venue: Olympic Velodrome, Los Angeles
- Dates: 2-3 August
- Competitors: 56 from 14 nations

Medalists
1st place, gold medalist(s)		Michael Grenda; Kevin Nichols; Michael Turtur; Dean Woods; Australia
2nd place, silver medalist(s)		Steve Hegg; Patrick McDonough; Leonard Nitz; Brent Emery; United States
3rd place, bronze medalist(s)		Reinhard Alber; Rolf Gölz; Roland Günther; Michael Marx; West Germany

The men's 4 km team pursuit cycling event at the 1984 Summer Olympics took place from 2 to 3 August and was one of eight cycling events at the 1984 Olympics. The qualification and quarter finals were on 2 August and the semi-finals and finals on 3 August.

== Results ==
=== Qualification ===
Rank	Cyclists	Nation	Time	Speed	Note
1	Roberto Amadio; Massimo Brunelli; Maurizio Colombo; Silvio Martinello	Italy	4:28,47	53,637	Q
2	Michael Grenda; Kevin Nichols; Michael Turtur; Dean Woods	Australia	4:28,79	53,573	Q
3	Reinhard Alber; Rolf Gölz; Roland Günther; Michael Marx	West Germany	4:28,97	53,537	Q
4	Dan Frost; Michael Markussen; Jørgen V. Pedersen; Brian Holm	Denmark	4:29,79	53,374	Q
5	Brent Emery; Steve Hegg; Patrick McDonough; Leonard Nitz	United States	4:29,92	53,349	Q
6	Didier Garcia; Éric Louvel; Pascal Potié; Pascal Robert	France	4:30,34	53,266	Q
7	Rudi Ceyssens; Roger Ilegems; Peter Roes; Joseph Smeets	Belgium	4:31,20	53,097	Q
8	Daniel Huwyler; Hans Ledermann; Hansruedi Märki; Jörg Müller	Switzerland	4:31,86	52,968	Q
9	Pedro Caino; Gabriel Curuchet; Juan Curuchet; Eduardo Trillini	Argentina	4:32,25	52,892	
10	Ralf Elshof; Rik Moorman; Jelle Nijdam; Marco van der Hulst	Netherlands	4:33,45	52,660	
11	Akio Kuwazawa; Harumitsu Okada; Mitsugi Sarudate; Yoshihiro Tsumuraya	Japan	4:34,39	42,480	
12	Steve Bent; Paul Curran; Mark Noble; Adrian Timmis	Great Britain	4:36,74	52,034	
13	Craig Adair; Anthony Cuff; Brian Fowler; Graeme Miller	New Zealand	4:37,57	51,878	
14	Lino Aquea; Eduardo Cuevas; Miguel Droguett; Fernando Vera	Chile	4:38,57	51,692	

=== Quarter finals ===
Heat 1

Rank	Nation	Time	Speed	Note
2	Denmark	4:25,16	54,306	
1	United States	4:25,15	54,308	Q

Heat 2

Rank	Nation	Time	Speed	Note
1	West Germany	4:28	53,723	Q
2	France	4:30,28	53,278	

Heat 3

Rank	Nation	Time	Speed	Note
1	Australia	4:30,19	53,295	Q
2	Belgium	4:31,53	53,032	

Heat 4

Rank	Nation	Time	Speed	Note
1	Italy	4:25,07	54,325	Q
2	Switzerland	4:30,47	53,240	

=== Semi finals ===
Heat 1

Rank	Nation	Time	Speed	Note
1	United States	-	-	Q
2	West Germany	-	OVT	

Heat 2

Rank	Nation	Time	Speed	Note
2	Italy	4:25,12	54,315	
1	Australia	4:23,56	54,636	Q

=== Final ===
Bronze medal

Rank	Nation	Time	Speed	Rank
2	West Germany	4:25,60	54:216	3
1	Italy	4:26,90	53,952	4

Gold medal

Rank	Nation	Time	Speed	Rank
1	Australia	4:25,99	54,137	1
2	United States	4:29,85	53,263	2
