= Cycling at the 1984 Summer Olympics – Men's individual pursuit =

Cycling - Men's individual pursuit at the Games of the XXIII Olympiad
- Venue: Olympic Velodrome, Los Angeles
- Dates: 30 July - 1 August
- Competitors: 33 from 21 nations

Medalists
1st place, gold medalist(s)		Steve Hegg; United States
2nd place, silver medalist(s)		Rolf Gölz; West Germany
3rd place, bronze medalist(s)		Leonard Nitz; United States

The Men's Individual Pursuit was a cycling event at the 1984 Summer Olympics in Los Angeles, California over a distance of 4000m.

== Medalists ==
Event	Gold	Silver	Bronze
Men's individual pursuit	Steve Hegg; United States	Rolf Gölz; West Germany	Leonard Nitz; United States

Final results

== Results ==
=== Qualifying round ===
Place	Cyclist	Time
1	Steve Hegg (USA)	4:35,57
2	Pascal Robert (FRA)	4:46,51
3	Leonard Nitz (USA)	4:46,99
4	Jørgen V. Pedersen (DEN)	4:48,42
5	Rolf Gölz (FRG)	4:48,55
6	Dean Woods (AUS)	4:49,51
7	Roberto Calovi (ITA)	4:49,89
8	Michael Grenda (AUS)	4:51,46
9	Rudi Ceyssens (BEL)	4:51,51
10	Jelle Nijdam (NED)	4:51.77
11	Shaun Wallace (GBR)	4:51,91
12	Jörg Müller (SUI)	4:52,57
13	Alex Stieda (CAN)	4:54,28
14	Gonzalez Caries Garcia (URU)	4:54,37
15	Anthony Cuff (NZL)	4:55,06
16	Gabriel Curuchet (ARG)	4:55,07
17	Gary Trevisiol (CAN)	4:57,01
18	Henning Larsen (DEN)	4:58,17
19	Maurizio Colombo (ITA)	4:59,72
20	Sixten Wackström (FIN)	4:59,94
21	Stephan Joho (SUI)	5:00,30
22	Hans Fischer (BRA)	5:00,47
23	William Palacio (COL)	5:01,17
24	Karl Krenauer (AUT)	5:01,18
25	Éric Louvel (FRA)	5:01,52
26	Steve Bent (GBR)	5:02,17
27	Fernando Vera (CHI)	5:02,53
28	Balbino Jaramillo (COL)	5:04,27
29	Diomedes Panton (PHI)	5:14,27
	Pedro Caino (ARG)	OVT
	Hsu Chin-te (TPE)	OVT
	Eduardo Cuevas (CHI)	OVT
	Ingo Wittenborn (FRG)	OVT

=== Round 1 ===
Heat	Place	Cyclist	Nation	Time	Qualified
1	1	Michael Grenda	Australia	4:48,99	Q
1	2	Rudi Ceyssens	Belgium	4:29,53	
2	2	Roberto Calovi	Italy	4:50,11	
2	1	Jelle Nijdam	Netherlands	4:46,78	Q
3	1	Dean Woods	Australia	4:43,72	Q
3	2	Shaun Wallace	Great Britain	4:50,80	
4	1	Rolf Gölz	West Germany	4:42,63	Q
4	2	Jörg Müller	Switzerland	4:53,07	
5	1	Jørgen V. Pedersen	Denmark	4:45,34	Q
5	2	Alex Stieda	Canada	4:51,75	
6	1	Leonard Nitz	United States	4:44,97	Q
6	2	Gonzalez Carlos Garcia	Uruguay	4:53,72	
7	1	Pascal Robert	France	4:47,94	Q
7	2	Anthony Cuff	New Zealand	4:50,49	
8	1	Steve Hegg	United States	4:40,26	Q
8	2	Gabriel Curuchet	Argentina	4:51,04	

=== Quarter finals ===
Heat	Place	Cyclist	Nation	Time	Qualified
1	1	Leonard Nitz	United States	4:43,98	Q
1	2	Jørgen V. Pedersen	Denmark	4:46,65	
2	1	Dean Woods	Australia	4:48,65	Q
2	2	Jelle Nijdam	Netherlands	4:52,98	
3	1	Rolf Gölz	West Germany	4:37,70	Q
3	2	Pascal Robert	France	OVT	
4	1	Steve Hegg	United States	4:37,10	Q
4	2	Michael Grenda	Australia	OVT	

=== Semi finals ===
Heat	Place	Cyclist	Nation	Time	Qualified
1	1	Rolf Gölz	West Germany	-	Q
1	2	Leonard Nitz	United States	OVT	
1	1	Steve Hegg	United States	4:47,07	Q
1	2	Dean Woods	Australia	4:55,02	

=== Bronze medal race ===
Heat	Place	Cyclist	Nation	Time	Qualified
1	2	Dean Woods	Australia	4:44,08	4
1	1	Leonard Nitz	United States	4:44,03	3

=== Gold medal race ===
Heat	Place	Cyclist	Nation	Time	Qualified
1	2	Rolf Gölz	West Germany	4:43,82	2
1	1	Steve Hegg	United States	4:39,35	1
