= United States men's national cycling team =

The United States men's national cycling team is the national cycling team for the United States of America and is governed by USA Cycling. The team takes part in international competitions such as the Summer Olympics, the Pan American Road and Track Championships, and the UCI Road World Championships.

== Road cycling ==
Road cycling is a team sport designed to determine individual placings. Professional cyclists mainly compete against each other on industry/trade sponsored cycling teams; however, for international competitions riders from the same nation compete together versus against each other to form a cycling team and represent the United States.

=== Past results ===
- 1982 UCI Road World Championship - Road Race: Silver Medal - Greg LeMond
- 1983 UCI Road World Championship - Road Race: Gold Medal - Greg LeMond
- 1984 Summer Olympics - Men's Individual Road Race: Gold Medal - Alexi Grewal
- 1984 Summer Olympics - Men's Team Time Trial: Bronze Medal - United States (Ron Kiefel, Clarence Knickman, Davis Phinney, Andrew Weaver)
- 1985 UCI Road World Championship - Road Race: Silver Medal - Greg LeMond
- 1989 UCI Road World Championship - Road Race: Gold Medal - Greg LeMond
- 1993 UCI Road World Championship - Road Race: Gold Medal - Lance Armstrong
- 2000 Summer Olympics - Men's Individual Time Trial: Bronze Medal - Lance Armstrong
- 2004 Summer Olympics - Men's Individual Time Trial: Gold Medal - Tyler Hamilton
- 2004 Summer Olympics - Men's Individual Time Trial: Bronze Medal - Bobby Julich
- 2006 UCI Road World Championships - Individual Time Trial: Silver Medal - David Zabriskie

== Track cycling ==
=== Past results ===
- 1984 Summer Olympics - Men's Individual Pursuit: Gold Medal - Steve Hegg
- 1984 Summer Olympics - Men's Individual Pursuit: Bronze Medal - Leonard Nitz
- 1984 Summer Olympics - Men's Individual Sprint: Gold Medal - Mark Gorski
- 1984 Summer Olympics - Men's Individual Sprint: Silver Medal - Nelson Vails
- 1984 Summer Olympics - Men's Team Pursuit: Bronze Medal - United States (David Grylls, Steve Hegg, Patrick McDonough, Leonard Nitz)
- 1992 Summer Olympics - 1000m Time Trial: Bronze Medal - Erin Hartwell
- 1994 UCI Track Cycling World Championships - Men's Sprint: Gold Medal - Marty Nothstein
- 1994 UCI Track Cycling World Championships - Men's Keirin: Gold Medal - Marty Nothstein
- 1996 UCI Track Cycling World Championships - Men's Keirin: Gold Medal - Marty Nothstein
- 1996 Summer Olympics - Men's 1000m Time Trial: Silver Medal - Erin Hartwell
- 1996 Summer Olympics - Men's Olympic Sprint: Silver Medal - Marty Nothstein
- 2000 Summer Olympics - Men's Olympic Sprint: Gold Medal - Marty Nothstein
- 2007 UCI Track Cycling World Championships - Men's Omnium: Bronze Medal Charles Bradley Huff
