= Chile at the 1984 Summer Olympics =

- IOC code: CHI
- NOC: Chilean Olympic Committee

in Los Angeles
- Competitors: 52 (50 men and 2 women) in 8 sports
- Flag bearer: Carlos Rossi
- Medals: Gold 0 Silver 0 Bronze 0 Total 0

Summer Olympics appearances (overview)
- 1896; 1900–1908; 1912; 1920; 1924; 1928; 1932; 1936; 1948; 1952; 1956; 1960; 1964; 1968; 1972; 1976; 1980; 1984; 1988; 1992; 1996; 2000; 2004; 2008; 2012; 2016; 2020; 2024

Chile competed at the 1984 Summer Olympics in Los Angeles, United States. The nation returned to the Summer Games after participating in the American-led boycott of the 1980 Summer Olympics. 52 competitors, 50 men and 2 women, took part in 25 events in 8 sports.

== Athletics ==
Men's 5,000 metres

- Omar Aguilar
  - Heat – 13:51.53
  - Semifinals – 13:51.13 (→ did not advance)

Men's 10,000 metres

- Omar Aguilar
  - Heat – 28:29.06 (→ did not advance)

Men's Marathon

- Alejandro Silva
  - Final – 2:29:53 (→ 57th place)
- Omar Aguilar
  - Final – did not finish (→ no ranking)

Men's 3,000m Steeplechase

- Emilio Ulloa
  - Heat – 8:29.71
  - Semifinals – 8:28.99 (→ did not advance)

Men's Shot Put

- Gert Weil
  - Qualifying Round – 19.94 m
  - Semifinals – 18.69 m (→ 10th place)

Women's 800 metres

- Alejandra Ramos
  - Heat – 2:05.773 (→ did not advance)

Women's 1,500 metres

- Alejandra Ramos
  - Heat – 4:22.03 (→ did not advance)

Women's 3,000 metres

- Monica Regonesi
  - Heat – did not finish (→ did not advance, no ranking)

Women's Marathon

- Monica Regonesi
  - Final – 2:44:44 (→ 32nd place)

== Cycling ==
Seven cyclists represented Chile in 1984.

Individual road race

- Manuel Aravena – did not finish (→ no ranking)
- Roberto Muñoz – did not finish (→ no ranking)

Sprint

- José Antonio Urquijo

1000m time trial

- Miguel Droguett

Individual pursuit

- Fernando Vera
- Eduardo Cuevas

Team pursuit

- Lino Aquea
- Eduardo Cuevas
- Miguel Droguett
- Fernando Vera

Points race

- Miguel Droguett
- Roberto Muñoz

== Football ==
Men's Team Competition:

- Preliminary Round (Group A)

29 July 1984 1	Norway	0–0	Chile	Boston
19:30 EDT		Report		Stadium: Harvard Stadium; Attendance: 25,000; Referee: David Socha (United States)

31 July 1984 2	Chile	1–0	Qatar	Annapolis
19:00 EDT	Baeza 52'	Report		Stadium: Navy–Marine Corps Memorial Stadium; Attendance: 14,508; Referee: Luis Paulino Siles (Costa Rica)

2 August 1984 3	Chile	1–1	France	Annapolis
19:00 EDT	Santis 5'	Report	Lemoult 50'	Stadium: Navy–Marine Corps Memorial Stadium; Attendance: 28,114; Referee: Jan Keizer (Netherlands)

- Quarter Finals

5 August 1984	Italy	1–0 (a.e.t.)	Chile	Palo Alto
15:00 PDT	Vignola 95' (pen.)	Report		Stadium: Stanford Stadium; Attendance: 67,349; Referee: Brian McGinlay (Scotland)

- Team Roster:
  - ( 1.) Eduardo Fournier
  - ( 2.) Daniel Ahumada
  - ( 3.) Luis Mosquera
  - ( 4.) Alex Martínez
  - ( 5.) Leonel Contreras
  - ( 6.) Alejandro Hisis
  - ( 7.) Alfredo Nuñez
  - ( 8.) Jaime Vera
  - ( 9.) Fernando Santis
  - (10.) Sergio Marchant
  - (11.) Juvenal Olmos
  - (12.) Patricio Toledo
  - (13.) Luis Pérez
  - (14.) Sergio Pacheco
  - (15.) Carlos Ramos
  - (16.) Jaime Baeza
  - (17.) Marco Antonio Figueroa
- Head Coach: Pedro Morales Torres

== Judo ==
Men's Middleweight

- Eduardo Novoa

== See also ==
- Chile at the 1983 Pan American Games
