= David Grylls =

American cyclist

Dave Grylls
Personal information
- Full name: David Mills Grylls
- Born: September 29, 1957 (age 69) Detroit, Michigan, U.S.
- Height: 6 ft 0 in (183 cm)
- Weight: 137 lb (62 kg)

Cycling career
- Sport: Cycling
- Discipline: Track
- Role: Rider
Medal record
Men's cycling
Representing United States
Olympic Games
Silver medal – second place	1984 Los Angeles	4.000m Team Pursuit
Pan American Games
Gold medal – first place	1983 Caracas	Individual Pursuit

David Mills Grylls (born September 29, 1957) is a retired track cyclist from the United States. He represented his native country at the 1984 Summer Olympics in Los Angeles, California, where he won the silver medal in the men's 4000 m team pursuit, alongside Steve Hegg, Leonard Nitz, Patrick McDonough and Brent Emery. He now coaches junior cyclists at the San Diego Velodrome.
