= Cycling at the 1984 Summer Olympics – Men's points race =

Olympic cycling event

Men's points race at the Games of the XXIII Olympiad
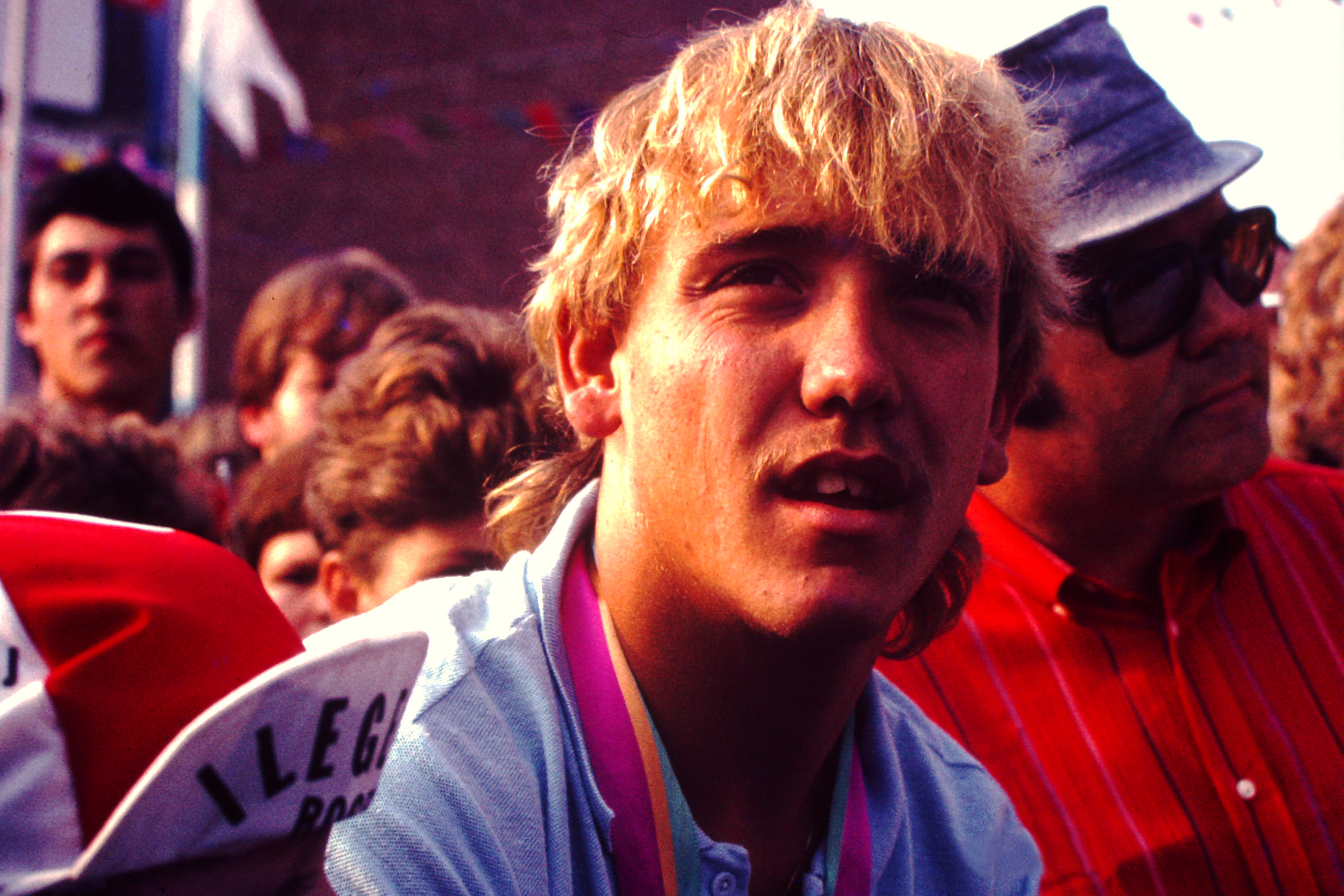
- Roger Ilegems wearing his gold medal
- Venue: Olympic Velodrome, Los Angeles
- Dates: 31 July to 3 August
- Competitors: 43 from 25 nations
- Winning score: 37 (0 laps behind)

Medalists
| 1st place, gold medalist(s) | | Roger Ilegems; Belgium |
| 2nd place, silver medalist(s) | | Uwe Messerschmidt; West Germany |
| 3rd place, bronze medalist(s) | | José Youshimatz; Mexico |

The men's points race was an event at the 1984 Summer Olympics in Los Angeles, California, for which the final was held on 3 August 1984. There were 43 participants from 25 nations (with 6 other cyclists not starting). Each nation was limited to 2 cyclists. 24 cyclists competed in the final after two semifinals (twelve best in each qualified). The event was won by Roger Ilegems of Belgium, with Uwe Messerschmidt taking silver and José Youshimatz of Mexico bronze. It was the first medal in the event for each nation, none of which had competed in the previous edition in 1900 (though a united Germany had competed and taken a medal).

== Background ==
This was the second appearance of the event. It was first held in 1900 and not again until 1984. After that, it was held every Summer Games until 2008 when it was removed from the programme. The women's version was held from 1996 through 2008.

The reigning World Champion (1983) was Michael Markussen of Denmark. The other two men from the world championship podium, Hans-Joachim Pohl of East Germany and Ivan Romanov of the Soviet Union, were not able to compete due to the Soviet-led boycott.

23 nations made their debut in the event. France and Italy competed for the second time, the only nations to have competed in 1900 as well as 1984.

== Competition format ==
The contest consisted of two rounds: semifinals and a final. The distance varied by round, with 30 kilometres in the semifinals and 50 kilometres in the final. The top 12 in each of the two semifinals advanced to the 24-man final. Placement in each race was determined first by how many laps behind the leader the cyclist was and second by how many sprint points the cyclist accumulated. That is, a cyclist with more sprint points but who was lapped once would be ranked behind a cyclist with fewer points but who had not been lapped. Sprint points could be gained only by cyclists who had not been lapped.

In the semifinals, there were 20 sprints—one every 1.5 kilometres. Points were awarded based on the position of the cyclists at the end of the sprint. Most of the sprints were worth 5 points for the leader, 3 to the second-place cyclist, 2 to third, and 1 to fourth. The 10th (halfway) and 20th (final) sprint were worth double: 10 points, 6, 4, and 2.

The final featured 30 sprints—one every 1.67 kilometres. As in the semifinals, most sprints were worth 5/3/2/1 points, with the halfway (15th) and final (30th) sprints worth 10/6/4/2.

== Schedule ==
All times are Pacific Daylight Time (UTC-7)

| Date | Time | Round |
|---|---|---|
| Tuesday, 31 July 1984 | 15:30 | Semifinal 1 |
| Wednesday, 1 August 1984 | 13:25 | Semifinal 2 |
| Friday, 3 August 1984 | 14:30 | Final |

== Results ==
=== Semifinals ===
==== Semifinal 1 ====
| Rank | Cyclist | Nation | Laps behind | Points | Notes |
|---|---|---|---|---|---|
| 1 | Brian Holm | Denmark | 0 | 37 | Q |
| 2 | Brian Fowler | New Zealand | 0 | 24 | Q |
| 3 | Juan Curuchet | Argentina | 1 | 35 | Q |
| 4 | Silvio Martinello | Italy | 1 | 13 | Q |
| 5 | William Palacio | Colombia | 1 | 11 | Q |
| 6 | Gary Trevisiol | Canada | 1 | 10 | Q |
| 7 | Roger Ilegems | Belgium | 1 | 9 | Q |
| 8 | Glenn Clarke | Australia | 2 | 20 | Q |
| 9 | Paul Curran | Great Britain | 2 | 13 | Q |
| 10 | Uwe Messerschmidt | West Germany | 2 | 10 | Q |
| 11 | Éric Louvel | France | 2 | 9 | Q |
| 12 | Stephan Joho | Switzerland | 2 | 8 | Q |
| 13 | Kurt Zellhofer | Austria | 2 | 6 | |
| 14 | Hans Fischer | Brazil | 2 | 5 | |
| 15 | Hitoshi Sato | Japan | 2 | 2 | |
| 15 | Danny Van Haute | United States | 2 | 2 | |
| 17 | Peter Aldridge | Jamaica | 2 | 1 | |
| 18 | Deogracias Asuncion | Philippines | 2 | 0 | |
| 18 | Roberto Muñoz | Chile | 2 | 0 | |

==== Semifinal 2 ====
| Rank | Cyclist | Nation | Laps behind | Points | Notes |
|---|---|---|---|---|---|
| 1 | Jörg Müller | Switzerland | 0 | 14 | Q |
| 2 | José Youshimatz | Mexico | 0 | 8 | Q |
| 3 | Didier Garcia | France | 0 | 6 | Q |
| 4 | Balbino Jaramillo | Colombia | 0 | 4 | Q |
| 5 | Michael Markussen | Denmark | 1 | 26 | Q |
| 6 | Alex Stieda | Canada | 1 | 23 | Q |
| 7 | Juan Carlos Haedo | Argentina | 1 | 19 | Q |
| 8 | Shaun Wallace | Great Britain | 1 | 18 | Q |
| 9 | Rudi Ceyssens | Belgium | 1 | 17 | Q |
| 10 | Manfred Donike | West Germany | 1 | 16 | Q |
| 11 | Derk van Egmond | Netherlands | 1 | 15 | Q |
| 12 | Stefano Allocchio | Italy | 1 | 12 | Q |
| 13 | Graeme Miller | New Zealand | 1 | 10 | |
| 14 | Mark Whitehead | United States | 1 | 9 | |
| 15 | Akio Kuwazawa | Japan | 1 | 8 | |
| 16 | Miguel Droguett | Chile | 1 | 4 | |
| 16 | Carlos García | Uruguay | 1 | 4 | |
| 18 | Gary West | Australia | 1 | 3 | |
| 19 | Edgardo Pagarigan | Philippines | 1 | 1 | |
| 19 | Paul Popp | Austria | 1 | 1 | |
| 21 | Aubrey Richmond | Guyana | 2 | 0 | |
| — | Elisha Hughes | Antigua and Barbuda | DNF | — | |
| — | Ernest Moodie | Cayman Islands | DNF | — | |
| — | Ian Stanley | Jamaica | DNF | — | |

=== Final ===
The final classification was as follows:

| Rank | Cyclist | Nation | Laps behind | Points |
|---|---|---|---|---|
| 1st place, gold medalist(s) | Roger Ilegems | Belgium | 0 | 37 |
| 2nd place, silver medalist(s) | Uwe Messerschmidt | West Germany | 0 | 16 |
| 3rd place, bronze medalist(s) | José Youshimatz | Mexico | 1 | 29 |
| 4 | Jörg Müller | Switzerland | 1 | 23 |
| 5 | Juan Curuchet | Argentina | 1 | 20 |
| 6 | Glenn Clarke | Australia | 1 | 13 |
| 7 | Brian Fowler | New Zealand | 1 | 12 |
| 8 | Derk van Egmond | Netherlands | 2 | 56 |
| 9 | Michael Markussen | Denmark | 2 | 21 |
| 10 | Alex Stieda | Canada | 2 | 17 |
| 11 | Rudi Ceyssens | Belgium | 2 | 16 |
| 12 | Didier Garcia | France | 2 | 13 |
| 13 | Balbino Jaramillo | Colombia | 2 | 12 |
| 14 | Stefano Allocchio | Italy | 2 | 11 |
| 15 | William Palacio | Colombia | 2 | 9 |
| 16 | Silvio Martinello | Italy | 2 | 8 |
| 17 | Brian Holm | Denmark | 3 | 12 |
| 18 | Gary Trevisiol | Canada | 3 | 10 |
| 19 | Manfred Donike | West Germany | 3 | 3 |
| 20 | Juan Carlos Haedo | Argentina | 3 | 1 |
| 21 | Shaun Wallace | Great Britain | 3 | 1 |
| 22 | Paul Curran | Great Britain | 4 | 13 |
| — | Éric Louvel | France | DNF | — |
| — | Stephan Joho | Switzerland | DNF | — |

== Results summary ==
| Rank | Cyclist | Nation | Semifinals | | Final | |
| Rank | Cyclist | Nation | Laps behind | Points | Laps behind | Points |
|---|---|---|---|---|---|---|
| 1st place, gold medalist(s) | Roger Ilegems | Belgium | 1 | 9 | 0 | 37 |
| 2nd place, silver medalist(s) | Uwe Messerschmidt | West Germany | 2 | 10 | 0 | 16 |
| 3rd place, bronze medalist(s) | José Youshimatz | Mexico | 0 | 8 | 1 | 29 |
| 4 | Jörg Müller | Switzerland | 0 | 14 | 1 | 23 |
| 5 | Juan Curuchet | Argentina | 1 | 35 | 1 | 20 |
| 6 | Glenn Clarke | Australia | 2 | 20 | 1 | 13 |
| 7 | Brian Fowler | New Zealand | 0 | 24 | 1 | 12 |
| 8 | Derk van Egmond | Netherlands | 1 | 15 | 2 | 56 |
| 9 | Michael Markussen | Denmark | 1 | 26 | 2 | 21 |
| 10 | Alex Stieda | Canada | 1 | 23 | 2 | 17 |
| 11 | Rudi Ceyssens | Belgium | 1 | 17 | 2 | 16 |
| 12 | Didier Garcia | France | 0 | 6 | 2 | 13 |
| 13 | Balbino Jaramillo | Colombia | 0 | 4 | 2 | 12 |
| 14 | Stefano Allocchio | Italy | 1 | 12 | 2 | 11 |
| 15 | William Palacio | Colombia | 1 | 11 | 2 | 9 |
| 16 | Silvio Martinello | Italy | 1 | 13 | 2 | 8 |
| 17 | Brian Holm | Denmark | 0 | 37 | 3 | 12 |
| 18 | Gary Trevisiol | Canada | 1 | 10 | 3 | 10 |
| 19 | Manfred Donike | West Germany | 1 | 16 | 3 | 3 |
| 20 | Juan Carlos Haedo | Argentina | 1 | 19 | 3 | 1 |
| 21 | Shaun Wallace | Great Britain | 1 | 18 | 3 | 1 |
| 22 | Paul Curran | Great Britain | 2 | 13 | 4 | 13 |
| 23 | Éric Louvel | France | 2 | 9 | DNF | — |
| 23 | Stephan Joho | Switzerland | 2 | 8 | DNF | — |
| 25 | Graeme Miller | New Zealand | 1 | 10 | Did not advance | |
| 26 | Mark Whitehead | United States | 1 | 9 | Did not advance | |
| 27 | Akio Kuwazawa | Japan | 1 | 8 | Did not advance | |
| 28 | Miguel Droguett | Chile | 1 | 4 | Did not advance | |
| 28 | Carlos García | Uruguay | 1 | 4 | Did not advance | |
| 30 | Gary West | Australia | 1 | 3 | Did not advance | |
| 31 | Edgardo Pagarigan | Philippines | 1 | 1 | Did not advance | |
| 31 | Paul Popp | Austria | 1 | 1 | Did not advance | |
| 33 | Kurt Zellhofer | Austria | 2 | 6 | Did not advance | |
| 34 | Hans Fischer | Brazil | 2 | 5 | Did not advance | |
| 35 | Hitoshi Sato | Japan | 2 | 2 | Did not advance | |
| 35 | Danny Van Haute | United States | 2 | 2 | Did not advance | |
| 37 | Peter Aldridge | Jamaica | 2 | 1 | Did not advance | |
| 38 | Deogracias Asuncion | Philippines | 2 | 0 | Did not advance | |
| 38 | Roberto Muñoz | Chile | 2 | 0 | Did not advance | |
| 40 | Aubrey Richmond | Guyana | 2 | 0 | Did not advance | |
| — | Elisha Hughes | Antigua and Barbuda | DNF | — | Did not advance | |
| — | Ernest Moodie | Cayman Islands | DNF | — | Did not advance | |
| — | Ian Stanley | Jamaica | DNF | — | Did not advance | |
| — | Lee Fu-hsiang | Chinese Taipei | DNS | — | Did not advance | |
| — | Kari Myyryläinen | Finland | DNS | — | Did not advance | |
| — | Salvador Rios | Mexico | DNS | — | Did not advance | |
| — | Gene Samuel | Trinidad and Tobago | DNS | — | Did not advance | |
| — | Randolph Toussaint | Guyana | DNS | — | Did not advance | |
| — | Clyde Wilson | Bermuda | DNS | — | Did not advance | |
