= Charlie Walsh (cyclist) =

David Barry Vivian Walsh, OAM, better known as Charlie Walsh, is an Australian former racing cyclist, cycling coach and academic.

== Racing career ==
Walsh's placings in Australian Amateur and then Professional Championships were:

1st place - once
2nd place - twice
3rd place - four times
4th place - fourteen times.

In South Australian State Championships he was placed first more than 70 times from sprint events to 125-mile road events, and toppled or set in excess of 25 State records.

Walsh won more than 1,000 events in 25 years of racing at national and state level, including the Austral Wheel Race in 1969 on a 50yd handicap, and the Melbourne Cup on Wheels.

== Coaching career ==
From 1985 Walsh was a cycling coach with Michael Turtur at the South Australian Sports Institute until about 1987. He was the National Coaching Director for the Australian Cycling Federation from 1980 developing and writing Level I & II books and writing the draft of the Level III book for coaching courses, and conducting coaching courses throughout Australia from 1979 to about 1985. He was the overall Head Cycling Coach of both track & road cycling at the Australian Institute of Sport from 1987 to 2001 when he oversaw Australia's rise in world track cycling to number one in 1993 and 1994. "Charlie" was Olympic Cycling Coach at six Olympic Games, fifteen Senior World Cycling Championships, five Commonwealth Games and two Goodwill Games.

Over his career as coach, Australia won two Olympic gold medals, nine silver, nine bronze and ten world titles. He coached Michael Grenda, Michael Turtur, Dean Woods, and Kevin Nichols, to win the 4,000m team pursuit at the 1984 Summer Olympics.

1981. Gained a National Commissaires Diploma in Melbourne, Australia.

1981. Gained an F.I.A.C./U.C.I./Olympic Solidarity Committee, International Cycling Coaches Diploma in New Zealand.

1982. Gained an F.I.A.C./U.C.I. International Cycling Coaches Diploma in East Germany.

1985. At the request of the International Olympic Solidarity Committee and U.C.I., he lectured at the International Coaches' Course in New Zealand.

1988, 1990 & 1991. Lectured at the 2nd, 3rd and 4th Australian Elite Coaches Seminars conducted by the Australian Olympic Committee, Australian Coaching Council, Australian Sports Commission, the Australian Institute of Sport and was awarded Certificates of Appreciation and Participation.

1989 & 1992. Lectured at the International Coaches' Course in U.S.A. for International Olympic Solidarity and U.S.A. Cycling Federation.

1994. Lectured at the 1994 International Coaching School / National Coaches Seminar in Canada for all sports.

2000+. Developed and conducted International Coaching Courses in Switzerland and other countries for U.C.I. & International Olympic Solidarity.

INTERNATIONAL CYCLING CONSULTANT

1990. He was one of four persons appointed by the Federation of International Amateur Cycling to be responsible for Coaching Development throughout the world.

1991. He attended the World Conference on Cycling in the Netherlands in the capacity of Coaching Consultant for Coaching Development.

1992. He attended the World Conference on Cycling in England in the above capacity.

1992. He attended the World Cycling Seminar in Paris as a consultant for planning of Pro/Am Cycling in the Olympics and future planning for World Track Cycling.

Walsh developed and conducted International Coaching Courses in Switzerland and other countries for the International Cycling Union and International Olympic Solidarity.

== Academic career ==
Walsh was a Senior Lecturer in Technical and Further Education at Kintore Avenue, Adelaide, then at Regency Park College until April 1985, specialising and writing a book on interferometry. During this time he was seconded to the University of Adelaide and helped construct an interferometer at an Australian Research Establishment which was the first in the world to measure black holes in space.

== Awards and Retirement ==
On Australia Day 1987 Walsh received an Order of Australia Medal (OAM) for service to cycling as national coaching director. Three years later in 1990 he was awarded the status of World Coach by the Union Cycliste Internationale. He has won nine awards as Australian Coach of the Year for all sports, and was awarded the Australian Sports Medal on 14 July 2000. From 2004 to 2011, Walsh assisted Adelaide coach Neil Craig with fitness and rehab. with the Australian Football League team, the Adelaide Crows.

In 2015, he was an inaugural Cycling Australia Hall of Fame inductee.
