= 1985 Giro d'Italia, Prologue to Stage 10 =

68th edition of the Giro d'Italia

The 1985 Giro d'Italia was the 68th edition of the Giro d'Italia, one of cycling's Grand Tours. The Giro began in Verona, with a prologue individual time trial on 16 May, and Stage 10 occurred on 27 May with a stage to Paola. The race finished in Lucca on 9 June.

== Prologue ==
16 May 1985 — Verona, 6.65 km (4.13 mi) (ITT)

Prologue result and general classification after Prologue

Rank	Rider	Team	Time
1	Francesco Moser (ITA)	Gis Gelati	7' 45"
2	Roberto Visentini (ITA)	Carrera–Inoxpran	+ 7"
3	Giuseppe Saronni (ITA)	Del Tongo–Colnago	+ 8"
4	Guido Bontempi (ITA)	Carrera–Inoxpran	+ 12"
5	Roberto Calovi (ITA)	Gis Gelati	+ 14"
6	Bernard Hinault (FRA)	La Vie Claire	+ 15"
7	Moreno Argentin (ITA)	Sammontana–Bianchi	s.t.
8	Daniel Wyder (SUI)	Cilo–Aufina–Magniflex	s.t.
9	Gregor Braun (FRG)	Ariostea–Oece	+ 16"
10	Frank Hoste (BEL)	Del Tongo–Colnago	+ 18"

== Stage 1 ==
17 May 1985 — Verona to Busto Arsizio, 218 km (135 mi)

Stage 1 result

Rank	Rider	Team	Time
1	Urs Freuler (SUI)	Atala	5h 56' 47"
2	Paolo Rosola (ITA)	Sammontana–Bianchi	s.t.
3	Silvestro Milani (ITA)	Malvor–Bottecchia–Vaporella	s.t.
4	Davis Phinney (USA)	7-Eleven	s.t.
5	Guido Bontempi (ITA)	Carrera–Inoxpran	s.t.
6	Claudio Savini (ITA)	Vini Ricordi–Pinarello–Sidermec	s.t.
7	Daniele Caroli (ITA)	Santini	s.t.
8	Frank Hoste (BEL)	Del Tongo–Colnago	s.t.
9	Giovanni Mantovani (ITA)	Supermercati Brianzoli	s.t.
10	Greg LeMond (USA)	La Vie Claire	s.t.

General classification after Stage 1

Rank	Rider	Team	Time
1	Francesco Moser (ITA)	Gis Gelati	6h 04' 32"
2	Urs Freuler (SUI)	Atala	+ 6"
3	Roberto Visentini (ITA)	Carrera–Inoxpran	+ 7"
4	Giuseppe Saronni (ITA)	Del Tongo–Colnago	+ 8"
5	Silvestro Milani (ITA)	Malvor–Bottecchia–Vaporella	+ 11"
6	Guido Bontempi (ITA)	Carrera–Inoxpran	+ 12"
7	Roberto Calovi (ITA)	Gis Gelati	+ 14"
8	Daniel Wyder (SUI)	Cilo–Aufina–Magniflex	+ 15"
9	Bernard Hinault (FRA)	La Vie Claire	s.t.
10	Moreno Argentin (ITA)	Sammontana–Bianchi	s.t.

== Stage 2 ==
18 May 1985 — Busto Arsizio to Milan, 38 km (24 mi) (TTT)

Stage 2 result

Rank	Team	Time
1	Del Tongo–Colnago	41' 48"
2	Gis Gelati	+ 11"
3	Carrera–Inoxpran	+ 16"
4	Ariostea–Oece	+ 31"
5	Sammontana–Bianchi	+ 1' 02"
6	La Vie Claire	+ 1' 09"
7	Murella–Rossin	+ 1' 16"
8	Alpilatte–Olmo–Cierre	+ 1' 26"
9	Vini Ricordi–Pinarello–Sidermec	+ 1' 35"
10	Atala	s.t.

General classification after Stage 2

Rank	Rider	Team	Time
1	Giuseppe Saronni (ITA)	Del Tongo–Colnago	6h 46' 28"
2	Francesco Moser (ITA)	Gis Gelati	+ 3"
3	Frank Hoste (BEL)	Del Tongo–Colnago	+ 10"
4	Emanuele Bombini (ITA)	Del Tongo–Colnago	+ 14"
5	Roberto Visentini (ITA)	Carrera–Inoxpran	+ 15"
6	Roberto Calovi (ITA)	Gis Gelati	+ 17"
7	Guido Bontempi (ITA)	Carrera–Inoxpran	+ 20"
8	Rudy Pevenage (BEL)	Del Tongo–Colnago	s.t.
9	Harald Maier (AUT)	Gis Gelati	+ 27"
10	Czesław Lang (POL)	Carrera–Inoxpran	+ 30"

== Stage 3 ==
19 May 1985 — Milan to Pinzolo, 190 km (120 mi)

Stage 3 result

Rank	Rider	Team	Time
1	Giuseppe Saronni (ITA)	Del Tongo–Colnago	5h 01' 41"
2	Acácio da Silva (POR)	Malvor–Bottecchia–Vaporella	s.t.
3	Johan van der Velde (NED)	Vini Ricordi–Pinarello–Sidermec	s.t.
4	Gerhard Zadrobilek (AUT)	Atala	s.t.
5	Franco Chioccioli (ITA)	Maggi Mobili–Fanini	s.t.
6	Francesco Moser (ITA)	Gis Gelati	s.t.
7	Davis Phinney (USA)	7-Eleven	s.t.
8	Stefan Mutter (SUI)	Carrera–Inoxpran	s.t.
9	Dag Erik Pedersen (NOR)	Murella–Rossin	s.t.
10	Jesper Worre (DEN)	Sammontana–Bianchi	s.t.

General classification after Stage 3

Rank	Rider	Team	Time
1	Giuseppe Saronni (ITA)	Del Tongo–Colnago	11h 47' 49"
2	Francesco Moser (ITA)	Gis Gelati	+ 23"
3	Frank Hoste (BEL)	Del Tongo–Colnago	+ 35"
4	Emanuele Bombini (ITA)	Del Tongo–Colnago	+ 39"
5	Roberto Visentini (ITA)	Carrera–Inoxpran	+ 40"
6	Guido Bontempi (ITA)	Carrera–Inoxpran	+ 45"
7	Rudy Pevenage (BEL)	Del Tongo–Colnago	s.t.
8	Stefan Mutter (SUI)	Carrera–Inoxpran	+ 51"
9	Harald Maier (AUT)	Gis Gelati	+ 52"
10	Czesław Lang (POL)	Carrera–Inoxpran	+ 55"

== Stage 4 ==
20 May 1985 — Pinzolo to Selva di Val Gardena, 237 km (147 mi)

Stage 4 result

Rank	Rider	Team	Time
1	Hubert Seiz (SUI)	Cilo–Aufina–Magniflex	6h 51' 53"
2	Bernard Hinault (FRA)	La Vie Claire	s.t.
3	Gianbattista Baronchelli (ITA)	Supermercati Brianzoli	+ 3"
4	Roberto Visentini (ITA)	Carrera–Inoxpran	s.t.
5	Marino Lejarreta (ESP)	Alpilatte–Olmo–Cierre	s.t.
6	Greg LeMond (USA)	La Vie Claire	+ 1' 20"
7	Stefan Mutter (SUI)	Carrera–Inoxpran	+ 1' 32"
8	Daniel Wyder (SUI)	Cilo–Aufina–Magniflex	+ 2' 03"
9	Johan van der Velde (NED)	Vini Ricordi–Pinarello–Sidermec	+ 2' 06"
10	Gottfried Schmutz (SUI)	Dromedario–Laminox	s.t.

General classification after Stage 4

Rank	Rider	Team	Time
1	Roberto Visentini (ITA)	Carrera–Inoxpran	18h 40' 20"
2	Bernard Hinault (FRA)	La Vie Claire	+ 48"
3	Marino Lejarreta (ESP)	Alpilatte–Olmo–Cierre	+ 1' 35"
4	Stefan Mutter (SUI)	Carrera–Inoxpran	+ 1' 45"
5	Francesco Moser (ITA)	Gis Gelati	+ 1' 51"
6	Hubert Seiz (SUI)	Cilo–Aufina–Magniflex	+ 2' 24"
7	Greg LeMond (USA)	La Vie Claire	+ 2' 29"
8	Silvano Contini (ITA)	Ariostea–Oece	+ 2' 48"
9	Gianbattista Baronchelli (ITA)	Supermercati Brianzoli	+ 2' 54"
10	Harald Maier (AUT)	Gis Gelati	+ 3' 09"

== Stage 5 ==
21 May 1985 — Selva di Val Gardena to Vittorio Veneto, 225 km (140 mi)

Stage 5 result

Rank	Rider	Team	Time
1	Emanuele Bombini (ITA)	Del Tongo–Colnago	5h 54' 40"
2	Roberto Pagnin (ITA)	Malvor–Bottecchia–Vaporella	s.t.
3	Marino Amadori (ITA)	Alpilatte–Olmo–Cierre	+ 3"
4	Urs Freuler (SUI)	Atala	+ 6"
5	Frank Hoste (BEL)	Del Tongo–Colnago	s.t.
6	Gilbert Glaus (SUI)	Cilo–Aufina–Magniflex	s.t.
7	Silvestro Milani (ITA)	Malvor–Bottecchia–Vaporella	s.t.
8	Stefan Mutter (SUI)	Carrera–Inoxpran	s.t.
9	Johan van der Velde (NED)	Vini Ricordi–Pinarello–Sidermec	s.t.
10	Davis Phinney (USA)	7-Eleven	s.t.

General classification after Stage 5

Rank	Rider	Team	Time
1	Roberto Visentini (ITA)	Carrera–Inoxpran	24h 35' 06"
2	Bernard Hinault (FRA)	La Vie Claire	+ 48"
3	Marino Lejarreta (ESP)	Alpilatte–Olmo–Cierre	+ 1' 36"
4	Stefan Mutter (SUI)	Carrera–Inoxpran	+ 1' 45"
5	Francesco Moser (ITA)	Gis Gelati	+ 1' 51"
6	Hubert Seiz (SUI)	Cilo–Aufina–Magniflex	+ 2' 24"
7	Greg LeMond (USA)	La Vie Claire	+ 2' 29"
8	Silvano Contini (ITA)	Ariostea–Oece	+ 2' 48"
9	Gianbattista Baronchelli (ITA)	Supermercati Brianzoli	+ 2' 51"
10	Harald Maier (AUT)	Gis Gelati	+ 3' 09"

== Stage 6 ==
22 May 1985 — Vittorio Veneto to Cervia, 237 km (147 mi)

Stage 6 result

Rank	Rider	Team	Time
1	Frank Hoste (BEL)	Del Tongo–Colnago	6h 19' 17"
2	Paolo Rosola (ITA)	Sammontana–Bianchi	s.t.
3	Urs Freuler (SUI)	Atala	s.t.
4	Johan van der Velde (NED)	Vini Ricordi–Pinarello–Sidermec	s.t.
5	Ralf Hofeditz (FRG)	Skil–Sem–Kas–Miko	s.t.
6	Patrizio Gambirasio (ITA)	Santini	s.t.
7	Roberto Pagnin (ITA)	Malvor–Bottecchia–Vaporella	s.t.
8	Pierino Gavazzi (ITA)	Atala	s.t.
9	Francesco Moser (ITA)	Gis Gelati	s.t.
10	Erich Maechler (SUI)	Carrera–Inoxpran	s.t.

General classification after Stage 6

Rank	Rider	Team	Time
1	Roberto Visentini (ITA)	Carrera–Inoxpran	30h 54' 43"
2	Bernard Hinault (FRA)	La Vie Claire	+ 28"
3	Marino Lejarreta (ESP)	Alpilatte–Olmo–Cierre	+ 1' 18"
4	Stefan Mutter (SUI)	Carrera–Inoxpran	+ 1' 25"
5	Francesco Moser (ITA)	Gis Gelati	+ 1' 31"
6	Hubert Seiz (SUI)	Cilo–Aufina–Magniflex	+ 2' 04"
7	Greg LeMond (USA)	La Vie Claire	+ 2' 09"
8	Gianbattista Baronchelli (ITA)	Supermercati Brianzoli	+ 2' 34"
9	Silvano Contini (ITA)	Ariostea–Oece	+ 2' 49"
10	Harald Maier (AUT)	Gis Gelati	s.t.

== Stage 7 ==
23 May 1985 — Cervia to Jesi, 185 km (115 mi)

Stage 7 result

Rank	Rider	Team	Time
1	Orlando Maini (ITA)	Alpilatte–Olmo–Cierre	5h 10' 41"
2	Urs Zimmermann (SUI)	Carrera–Inoxpran	s.t.
3	Marco Giovannetti (ITA)	Ariostea–Oece	s.t.
4	Philippe Poissonnier (FRA)	Skil–Sem–Kas–Miko	s.t.
5	Fabrizio Vannucci (ITA)	Maggi Mobili–Fanini	s.t.
6	Dominique Arnaud (FRA)	La Vie Claire	s.t.
7	Giuseppe Saronni (ITA)	Del Tongo–Colnago	+ 1' 52"
8	Frank Hoste (BEL)	Del Tongo–Colnago	s.t.
9	Silvano Riccò (ITA)	Dromedario–Laminox	s.t.
10	Johan van der Velde (NED)	Vini Ricordi–Pinarello–Sidermec	s.t.

General classification after Stage 7

Rank	Rider	Team	Time
1	Roberto Visentini (ITA)	Carrera–Inoxpran	36h 07' 16"
2	Bernard Hinault (FRA)	La Vie Claire	+ 28"
3	Marino Lejarreta (ESP)	Alpilatte–Olmo–Cierre	+ 1' 16"
4	Stefan Mutter (SUI)	Carrera–Inoxpran	+ 1' 25"
5	Francesco Moser (ITA)	Gis Gelati	+ 1' 31"
6	Hubert Seiz (SUI)	Cilo–Aufina–Magniflex	+ 2' 04"
7	Greg LeMond (USA)	La Vie Claire	+ 2' 09"
8	Gianbattista Baronchelli (ITA)	Supermercati Brianzoli	+ 2' 34"
9	Silvano Contini (ITA)	Ariostea–Oece	+ 2' 48"
10	Harald Maier (AUT)	Gis Gelati	+ 2' 49"

== Rest day ==
24 May 1985

== Stage 8a ==
25 May 1985 — Foggia to Foggia, 45 km (28 mi)

Stage 8a result

Rank	Rider	Team	Time
1	Stefano Allocchio (ITA)	Malvor–Bottecchia–Vaporella	53' 52"
2	Urs Freuler (SUI)	Atala	s.t.
3	Pierino Gavazzi (ITA)	Ariostea–Oece	s.t.
4	Johan van der Velde (NED)	Vini Ricordi–Pinarello–Sidermec	s.t.
5	Peter Pieters (NED)	Zor–Gemeaz Cusin	s.t.
6	Silvestro Milani (ITA)	Malvor–Bottecchia–Vaporella	s.t.
7	Frank Hoste (BEL)	Del Tongo–Colnago	s.t.
8	Davis Phinney (USA)	7-Eleven	s.t.
9	Greg LeMond (USA)	La Vie Claire	s.t.
10	Dag Erik Pedersen (NOR)	Murella–Rossin	s.t.

General classification after Stage 8a

Rank	Rider	Team	Time
1	Roberto Visentini (ITA)	Carrera–Inoxpran	

== Stage 8b ==
25 May 1985 — Foggia to Matera, 167 km (104 mi)

Stage 8b result

Rank	Rider	Team	Time
1	Acácio da Silva (POR)	Malvor–Bottecchia–Vaporella	4h 13' 39"
2	Frank Hoste (BEL)	Del Tongo–Colnago	s.t.
3	Pierino Gavazzi (ITA)	Ariostea–Oece	s.t.
4	Franco Chioccioli (ITA)	Maggi Mobili–Fanini	s.t.
5	Johan van der Velde (NED)	Vini Ricordi–Pinarello–Sidermec	s.t.
6	Davide Cassani (ITA)	Santini	s.t.
7	Ezio Moroni (ITA)	Atala	s.t.
8	Greg LeMond (USA)	La Vie Claire	s.t.
9	Tom Schuler (USA)	7-Eleven	s.t.
10	Mauro Longo (ITA)	Malvor–Bottecchia–Vaporella	s.t.

General classification after Stage 8b

Rank	Rider	Team	Time
1	Roberto Visentini (ITA)	Carrera–Inoxpran	41h 14' 47"
2	Bernard Hinault (FRA)	La Vie Claire	+ 28"
3	Marino Lejarreta (ESP)	Alpilatte–Olmo–Cierre	+ 1' 16"
4	Stefan Mutter (SUI)	Carrera–Inoxpran	+ 1' 25"
5	Francesco Moser (ITA)	Gis Gelati	+ 1' 31"
6	Hubert Seiz (SUI)	Cilo–Aufina–Magniflex	+ 2' 04"
7	Greg LeMond (USA)	La Vie Claire	+ 2' 09"
8	Gianbattista Baronchelli (ITA)	Supermercati Brianzoli	+ 2' 34"
9	Silvano Contini (ITA)	Ariostea–Oece	+ 2' 48"
10	Harald Maier (AUT)	Gis Gelati	+ 2' 49"

== Stage 9 ==
26 May 1985 — Matera to Crotone, 237 km (147 mi)

Stage 9 result

Rank	Rider	Team	Time
1	Paolo Rosola (ITA)	Sammontana–Bianchi	5h 48' 41"
2	Guido Bontempi (ITA)	Carrera–Inoxpran	s.t.
3	Patrizio Gambirasio (ITA)	Santini	s.t.
4	Giuseppe Saronni (ITA)	Del Tongo–Colnago	s.t.
5	Johan van der Velde (NED)	Vini Ricordi–Pinarello–Sidermec	s.t.
6	Urs Freuler (SUI)	Atala	s.t.
7	Frank Hoste (BEL)	Del Tongo–Colnago	s.t.
8	Roberto Pagnin (ITA)	Malvor–Bottecchia–Vaporella	s.t.
9	Silvano Riccò (ITA)	Dromedario–Laminox	s.t.
10	Davis Phinney (USA)	7-Eleven	s.t.

General classification after Stage 9

Rank	Rider	Team	Time
1	Roberto Visentini (ITA)	Carrera–Inoxpran	47h 03' 28"
2	Bernard Hinault (FRA)	La Vie Claire	+ 28"
3	Marino Lejarreta (ESP)	Alpilatte–Olmo–Cierre	+ 1' 16"
4	Stefan Mutter (SUI)	Carrera–Inoxpran	+ 1' 25"
5	Francesco Moser (ITA)	Gis Gelati	+ 1' 31"
6	Hubert Seiz (SUI)	Cilo–Aufina–Magniflex	+ 2' 04"
7	Greg LeMond (USA)	La Vie Claire	+ 2' 09"
8	Gianbattista Baronchelli (ITA)	Supermercati Brianzoli	+ 2' 34"
9	Silvano Contini (ITA)	Ariostea–Oece	+ 2' 48"
10	Harald Maier (AUT)	Gis Gelati	+ 2' 49"

== Stage 10 ==
27 May 1985 — Crotone to Paola, 203 km (126 mi)

Stage 10 result

Rank	Rider	Team	Time
1	Acácio da Silva (POR)	Malvor–Bottecchia–Vaporella	5h 38' 56"
2	Silvano Contini (ITA)	Ariostea–Oece	s.t.
3	Alberto Volpi (ITA)	Sammontana–Bianchi	s.t.
4	Franco Chioccioli (ITA)	Maggi Mobili–Fanini	s.t.
5	Michael Wilson (AUS)	Alpilatte–Olmo–Cierre	s.t.
6	Gianbattista Baronchelli (ITA)	Supermercati Brianzoli	s.t.
7	Bernard Hinault (FRA)	La Vie Claire	s.t.
8	Greg LeMond (USA)	La Vie Claire	s.t.
9	Marco Giovannetti (ITA)	Ariostea–Oece	s.t.
10	Emanuele Bombini (ITA)	Del Tongo–Colnago	s.t.

General classification after Stage 10

Rank	Rider	Team	Time
1	Roberto Visentini (ITA)	Carrera–Inoxpran	52h 42' 24"
2	Bernard Hinault (FRA)	La Vie Claire	+ 28"
3	Marino Lejarreta (ESP)	Alpilatte–Olmo–Cierre	+ 1' 16"
4	Francesco Moser (ITA)	Gis Gelati	+ 1' 36"
5	Greg LeMond (USA)	La Vie Claire	+ 2' 09"
6	Silvano Contini (ITA)	Ariostea–Oece	+ 2' 33"
7	Gianbattista Baronchelli (ITA)	Supermercati Brianzoli	+ 2' 34"
8	Acácio da Silva (POR)	Malvor–Bottecchia–Vaporella	+ 2' 59"
9	Tommy Prim (SWE)	Sammontana–Bianchi	+ 3' 21"
10	Michael Wilson (AUS)	Alpilatte–Olmo–Cierre	+ 3' 44"
