= Harumitsu =

- Gender: Male

Origin
- Origin: Japanese
- Meaning: Different meanings depending on the kanji used

Harumitsu (written: 晴光 or 治光) is a masculine Japanese given name. Notable people with the name include:

- Harumitsu Hamano (浜野 治光; born 1957), Japanese golfer
- Harumitsu Okada (岡田 晴光; born 1960), Japanese cyclist
