= Chile at the 1992 Summer Olympics =

- IOC code: CHI
- NOC: Chilean Olympic Committee

in Barcelona
- Competitors: 12 (9 men and 3 women) in 7 sports
- Flag bearer: Gert Weil
- Medals: Gold 0 Silver 0 Bronze 0 Total 0

Summer Olympics appearances (overview)
- 1896; 1900–1908; 1912; 1920; 1924; 1928; 1932; 1936; 1948; 1952; 1956; 1960; 1964; 1968; 1972; 1976; 1980; 1984; 1988; 1992; 1996; 2000; 2004; 2008; 2012; 2016; 2020; 2024

Chile competed at the 1992 Summer Olympics in Barcelona, Spain. Twelve competitors, nine men and three women, took part in twelve events in seven sports.

== Competitors ==
The following is the list of number of competitors in the Games.

| Sport | Men | Women | Total |
|---|---|---|---|
| Athletics | 3 | 0 | 3 |
| Boxing | 1 | – | 1 |
| Cycling | 1 | 0 | 1 |
| Sailing | 0 | 1 | 1 |
| Shooting | 2 | 0 | 2 |
| Table tennis | 2 | 1 | 3 |
| Tennis | 0 | 1 | 1 |
| Total | 9 | 3 | 12 |

== Athletics ==
Men's Marathon

- Jaime Ojeda – 2:28.39 (→ 62nd place)

Men's Pole Vault

- Tómas Riether

Men's Shot Put

- Gert Weil
  - Qualification – 19.41 m (→ did not advance)

== Boxing ==
Men's Middleweight

- Ricardo Araneda
  - First Round – Defeated Luis Hugo Mendez (URU), RSC-2 (02:20)
  - Second Round – Lost to Lee Seung-Bae (KOR), 8:12

== Cycling ==
One male cyclists represented Chile in 1992.

Men's road race

- Miguel Droguett

Men's points race

- Miguel Droguett

== Tennis ==
Women's Singles Competition

- Paulina Sepúlveda
  - First Round – Lost to Sandra Cecchini (Italy) 2-6 3-6

== See also ==
- Chile at the 1991 Pan American Games
