= Louvel =

Louvel is a surname. Notable people with the surname include:

- Éric Louvel (born 1962), French racing cyclist
- Jean-Marie Louvel (1900–1970), French engineer and politician
- Matis Louvel (born 1999), French cyclist
- Olivia Louvel, French composer
- Louis Pierre Louvel (1783–1820), assassin of the Duke of Berry
