= James Hibbard =

American road racing cyclist (born 1981)

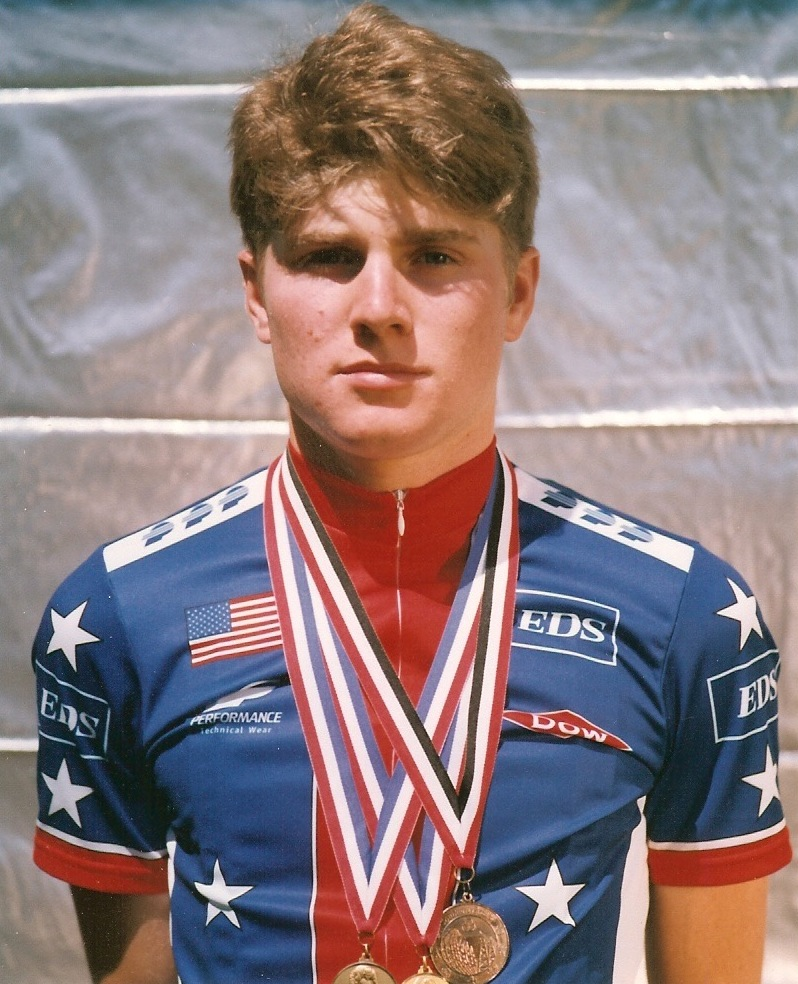

Personal information
- Full name: James Hamilton Hibbard
- Born: October 19, 1981 (age 44) United States
- Height: 5 ft 11 in (1.80 m)
- Weight: 148 lb (67 kg)

Cycling career
- Sport: Cycling
- Discipline: Road/ Track
- Role: Rider
- Rider type: Sprinter

Amateur teams
- 1995: Garden City Wheelmen
- 1996–1997: Peninsula Velo
- 1998–1999: Los Gatos Bicycle Racing Club
- 2001–2004: The Olympic Club

Professional teams
- 2000: Shaklee
- 2005: HealthNet p/b Maxxis

James Hamilton Hibbard (born October 19, 1981, in Palo Alto, California) is an American road racing cyclist who competed for the Shaklee and HealthNet p/b Maxxis professional cycling Teams. He began racing at the Hellyer Park Velodrome in San Jose, California, as a junior in 1995, and competed through 2005.

After retiring from the sport, he turned to writing and his memoir, "The Art of Cycling: Philosophy, Meaning, and a Life on Two Wheels" was published in 2021.

His second book is slated to published by Farrar, Straus and Giroux in North America in 2027.

== Cycling career ==
Hibbard was the Northern California/Nevada State Track Cycling Champion at the Junior, Under-23, and Elite-levels in both sprint and endurance events. He is a nineteen-time medalist at the United States National Track Cycling Championships. As a member of the United States men's national cycling team, he was a bronze medalist at Trinidad and Tobago's Southern Games in 2000 and placed 5th in the team sprint at the 2000 U.S. Olympic Team Trials in Frisco, Texas. Part of both the junior and senior national cycling team, he was a resident athlete at the United States Olympic Training Center.

Although a member of several Union Cycliste Internationale professional road cycling teams, Hibbard competed primarily as a track cyclist. While focused almost exclusively on the track, he was the 2003 Olympic Club Cycling Team Hans Ohrt Rider of the Year.

Competing as a collegiate cyclist for University of California Santa Cruz, Hibbard was a 2003 National Collegiate Cycling Association All-American track cyclist.

== Anti-doping Stance ==
Coached by 1984 Olympic medalist Leonard Nitz for the majority of his career, Hibbard has been vocal in his support of drug-free sports. In July 2002, he was profiled by Elliott Almond of the San Jose Mercury News, and in several interviews with outlets including NBC News as well as in column for The Huffington Post, he was critical of what he described as "rampant" doping in professional cycling.

His correspondence with Irish Tour de France rider and cycling journalist Paul Kimmage about the problem of performance-enhancing drugs in professional cycling appeared in the preface to the 2007 edition of Kimmage's book Rough Ride.

== Writing ==
Hibbard's memoir, "The Art of Cycling: Philosophy, Meaning, and a Life on Two Wheels," was published by Quercus Books in the United Kingdom, Simon & Schuster in North America, Hachette in Australia, and Edel Books in Germany.

Favorably reviewed by outlets including The Wall Street Journal and compared to the 1974 Robert Pirsig book Zen and the Art of Motorcycle Maintenance, the memoir was shortlisted for the 2022 British Sports Book Awards in the cycling category. He has been supported by PEN America and selected by Tin House for their Winter Workshop.

His reviews and criticism have appeared in publications including Ploughshares and Five Books.

An untitled second book was sold to legacy American publisher Farrar, Straus and Giroux in a preemptive bid.

== Education ==
James studied philosophy at the University of California, Santa Cruz and under the Heidegger scholar and translator William McNeill at DePaul University.

== Personal life ==
Per several interviews and podcasts, as of 2025 Hibbard currently resides in Morgan Hill, California.

He suffers from a degenerative eye condition and in late 2024, he stated his desire to return to elite cycling to raise awareness and funding for vision research.

His sister is the Yale-trained MFA fine art photographer, Elizabeth Hibbard.
