= José Youshimatz =

Mexican cyclist (born 1962)

Personal information
- Born: 10 May 1962 (age 64) Puebla, Mexico

Cycling career
- Sport: Cycling
Medal record
Representing Mexico
Men's track cycling
Olympic Games
Bronze medal – third place	1984 Los Angeles	Points race
Pan American Games
Silver medal – second place	1987 Indianapolis	Points Race

José Manuel Youshimatz (born 10 May 1962) is a Mexican former track cyclist and road bicycle racer who represented his national country at the 1984 Summer Olympics in Los Angeles, California. There he won the bronze medal in the men's points race behind Belgium's Roger Ilegems and West Germany's Uwe Messerschmidt. He competed in three consecutive Summer Olympics, starting in 1984.
