= Cycling Australia Hall of Fame =

Cycling Australia Hall of Fame was established in 2015. The focus of the Hall of Fame is on athletic performance but also acknowledge administrators, officials and coaches. A ‘Legends of the sport’ category will be introduced three years after 2015.

== Selection ==
The inaugural Selection Committee comprised: Peter Bartels (chair), Kate Bates, Rob Eva, Matthew Keenan, Michael Turtur, John Trevorrow and Anna Wilson

There are two categories:

Athlete - An athlete cannot be considered for inclusion into the Hall of Fame until after a two-year period following retirement from competition at the highest level. Athletes must be Australian citizens; achieved at the highest level of competition in their chosen discipline; and have the support of their peers.

General - Administrator, official or coach can be considered for inclusion by providing no less than twenty years of service to the sport; served on Australian teams as a coach or administrator, coached a rider or riders to medal at Olympic Games, Commonwealth Games, World Championships, World Cups, WorldTour races or World Record/s;, made a significant and enduring positive contribution to the development of cycling and its standing in the community; and officiated at Olympic Games, Commonwealth Games, World Championships, World Cups or WorldTour races.

== Inductees ==
Athlete	Year	Category
Hubert Opperman	2015	Athlete
Russell Mockridge	2015	Athlete
Edgar ' Dunc' Gray	2015	Athlete
Sid Patterson	2015	Athlete
Phil Anderson	2015	Athlete
Kathy Watt	2015	Athlete
Anna Wilson	2015	Athlete
Robbie McEwen	2015	Athlete
Sara Carrigan	2015	Athlete
Ray Godkin	2015	General
Charlie Walsh	2015	General
Gerry Ryan	2015	General
Ryan Bayley	2016	Athlete
Oenone Wood	2016	Athlete
Iris Dixon (née Bent)	2016	Athlete
Chris Scott	2016	Athlete
Mary Daubert (née Grigson)	2016	Athlete
Alf Goullet	2016	Athlete
