= Bay Classic Series =

Australian criterium road cycling races

The Bay Classic Series (last run as the 2023 Citroen Bay Crits) were a road cycling race held annually in and around Port Phillip Bay in Victoria, Australia. The race consisted of both a men's and a women's competition over three stages.

The men's stages were approximately one-hour criteriums (45 minutes plus 10 laps) with three sprints at 15-minute intervals. The women's stages were approximately 45-minute criteriums (30 minutes plus 10 laps) with two sprints at 15-minute intervals. Points were awarded to the first 10 riders at the finish (12, 10, 8 to 1). Additional points were awarded in the intermediate sprints to the first three places (3, 2 & 1 points) towards a separate sprint classification. A team classification was calculated from the points of the highest ranked three riders in each team of five.

Many world-class riders have previously ridden in the "Bay Classic Series", including Graeme Brown, Robbie McEwen, Mark Renshaw, Baden Cooke and Chris Sutton.

The event was founded by John Trevorrow in 1989 and was the race director throughout the series.

In 2022 the Bay crits ran on the weekend of January 8-9 2022 at Eastern Gardens Geelong

The final version was held in January 2023. In May 2023 the organisers announced the series would not be returning.

== Past winners ==
Year	Men's Winner	Women's Winner
2023	(Australia) Brenton Jones	(Australia) Ruby Roseman-Gannon
2022	(Australia) Blake Quick	(Australia) Ruby Roseman-Gannon
2020	(Australia) Sam Welsford	(Australia) Chloe Hosking
2019	(Austria) Marco Haller	(Italy) Valentina Scandolara
2017	(United Kingdom) Ian Bibby	(Italy) Valentina Scandolara
2016	(Australia) Caleb Ewan	(Australia) Gracie Elvin
2015	(Australia) Caleb Ewan	(Australia) Chloe Hosking
2014	(Australia) Brenton Jones	(Italy) Giorgia Bronzini
2013	(Australia) Caleb Ewan	(Australia) Melissa Hoskins
2012	(Australia) Allan Davis	(Australia) Melissa Hoskins
2011	(Australia) Matthew Goss	(Australia) Rochelle Gilmore
2010	(Australia) Chris Sutton	(Australia) Rochelle Gilmore
2009	(Australia) Graeme Brown	(Australia) Kirsty Broun
2008	(Australia) Mark Renshaw	(Australia) Megan Dunn
2007	(Australia) Mark Renshaw	(Australia) Katherine Bates
2006	(Australia) Hilton Clarke	(Australia) Katie Mactier
2005	(Australia) Robbie McEwen	(Australia) Oenone Wood
2004	(Australia) Baden Cooke	(Australia) Oenone Wood
2003	(Australia) Robbie McEwen	(Australia) Kate Bates
2002	(Australia) Robbie McEwen	(Australia) Rochelle Gilmore
2001	(Australia) Robbie McEwen	(Australia) Anna Milward
2000	(Australia) Brett Aitken	(Australia) Karen Barrow
1999	(Australia) Robbie McEwen	(Australia) Anna Wilson
1998	(Australia) Brett Aitken	(Australia) Anna Wilson
1997	(Australia) Robbie McEwen	(Australia) Sandra Smith
1996	(Australia) David McKenzie	(Australia) Anna Wilson
1995	(Australia) Neil Stephens	(Australia) Kathy Watt
1994	(Australia) Rick McCaig	(Australia) Kathy Watt
1993	(Australia) Peter Attard	
1992	(Australia) Glenn Clarke	
1990	(Australia) Glenn Clarke	
1989	(Switzerland) Peter Steiger	

== Race Cancellations ==
The Bay Classic Series has been running continuously since 1989, with some exceptions:

Year	Reason
2021	Not held due to the COVID 19 pandemic
2018	Not held due to a clash with the National Road Cycling Championships

== Past Results ==
- 2020 Results
- 2013 Results
- Men's Results
- Women's Results
