= Patrick McDonough (cyclist) =

American racing cyclist

Personal information
- Born: July 22, 1961 (age 65) Long Beach, California

Cycling career
- Sport: Cycling
Medal record
Men's cycling
Representing United States
Olympic Games
Silver medal – second place	1984 Los Angeles	Team pursuit

Patrick McDonough (born July 22, 1961) is a retired track cyclist from the United States. He represented his native country of the United States at the 1984 Summer Olympics in Los Angeles, California, where he won the silver medal in the men's 4,000m team pursuit, alongside Steve Hegg, Leonard Nitz, David Grylls and Brent Emery.

In recent years McDonough has helped run the Olympic Training Center Velodrome and the Boulder Valley Velodrome.

== Blood doping ==
McDonough later admitted to "blood doping" at the 1984 Los Angeles Games. "Blood doping" was banned by the IOC in 1985 (at the time of the Olympics it was not banned), though no test existed for it at the time.
