= Gary West (disambiguation) =

Gary West or Garry West may be:

- Gary West, English footballer
- Gary West (cyclist), Australian cyclist
- Garry West, Australian politician
