= Hsu Chin-te =

Taiwanese cyclist

Personal information
- Full name: 徐 進德, Pinyin: Xú Jìn-dé
- Born: 1 February 1966 (age 60)

Cycling career
- Sport: Cycling

Hsu Chin-te (born 1 February 1966) is a Taiwanese former cyclist. He competed in the individual pursuit event at the 1984 Summer Olympics.
