= Iris Dixon =

Australian cycling champion

Iris Mary Bent (later Iris Dixon, 1931–2022) was an Australian cyclist. She won sixteen Australian national titles and was crowned Australian Champion of Champions at least three times. During Bent's career, women's cycling was not yet an event at the world championships or the Olympics. In 1951, she was described by one paper as "the best women's track cyclist in the world today". After the birth of her second child, she stopped racing but she returned to competitive racing in her mid-fifties in the 1970s. Bent was inducted into Cycling Australia Hall of Fame in 2016. In 2025, the Dixon Veloway, a cycling highway, in Melbourne was named for her.

== Early life ==
Bent was born in 1931 in North Carlton, Melbourne, Australia. She was the daughter of George "Buzzer" and Ellen Bent, and the eldest of four children.

Bent learnt to ride when she was four years old on a bicycle her father had built for her. She started training at the Brunswick Cycling Club where her father also raced. At the time, women could not join the club but the club allowed girls and women to train on their track. In 1945, when she was 14, Bent was entered into her first race.

== Cycling career ==
In 1947, she raced with the Victorian Women's Professional Cycling Union. The League of Victorian Wheelmen refused to recognise women's racing so the union became aligned with the Victorian Athletics League, whose lent officials to oversee women's races held in conjunction with local athletic carnivals.

In 1949, Bent won four national races at Adelaide to be crowned Australian "Champion of Champions". Originally trained by her father, after her marriage, she was trained by husband, Jim Dixon.

In 1951, she won all five national titles at the Bundaberg championships to retain the title "Champion of Champions". On her return to Melbourne she was met by Hubert Opperman, the federal MP and former cyclist, who was Chairman of the Commonwealth Jubilee sporting celebrations committee. Opperman described her achievement as "the most outstanding showing by a Victorian woman cyclist in history." In 1951, the Sunday Mail dubbed her "the best women's track cyclist in the world today".

Dixon was also the 1952 national champion. In 1953, she won four of five titles at the Mt Isa Carnival to retain the title of Australian Champion of Champions.

She continued racing after the birth of her first child but stopped racing after the birth of her second child before returning to racing again in her mid-fifties in the 1970s. At sixty, she won the open 66 kilometre Northern Veterans handicap race from Benalla to Yarrawonga in 1992 .

== Personal life ==
In 1948, Iris married James Herbert Dixon, a fellow cyclist from Western Australia. She was 18. Dixon would become her coach and the couple went onto have four children. Bent continued riding well into her 80s.

Iris Dixon died on 23 July 2022; she was 91.

== Recognition ==
In 2014, Dixon was inducted into the Cycling Victoria Hall of Fame followed by the Cycling Australia Hall of Fame in 2016 She was also posthumously awarded a local council award for contribution to sport.

In 2023, the National Museum of Australia acquired thirteen items in order to establish an Iris Dixon Collection. Two years later, in 2025, the Dixon Veloway, a multi-lane cycling overpass, was named for her in Melbourne.
