= Ingo Wittenborn =

German cyclist

Personal information
- Born: 30 September 1964 (age 62)

Cycling career
- Sport: Cycling

Ingo Wittenborn (born 30 September 1964) is a German former cyclist. He competed in the individual pursuit event at the 1984 Summer Olympics.
