= Balbino Jaramillo =

Colombian cyclist (1951–2013)

Personal information
- Born: 15 May 1951
- Died: 7 May 2013 (aged 61) Medellín, Colombia

Cycling career
- Sport: Cycling

Balbino Jaramillo (15 May 1951 – 7 May 2013) was a Colombian cyclist. He competed in the individual pursuit and points race events at the 1984 Summer Olympics.
