= Hitoshi Sato =

Japanese cyclist

Personal information
- Born: 3 October 1962 (age 64) Akita Prefecture, Japan

Cycling career
- Sport: Cycling

Hitoshi Sato (佐藤 仁, Satō Hitoshi; born 3 October 1962) is a Japanese former cyclist. He competed in the points race event at the 1984 Summer Olympics. He is also a professional keirin cyclist.
