= Marco van der Hulst =

Dutch cyclist

Personal information
- Born: 20 May 1963 Haarlem, Netherlands
- Height: 188 cm (6 ft 2 in)
- Weight: 76 kg (168 lb)

Cycling career
- Sport: Cycling

Marco van der Hulst (born 20 May 1963) is a Dutch cyclist. He competed in the men's team pursuit event at the 1984 Summer Olympics, finishing in tenth place.

== See also ==
- List of Dutch Olympic cyclists
