= Massimo Brunelli =

Italian cyclist

Personal information
- Born: 27 July 1961 (age 65) Milan, Italy

Cycling career
- Sport: Cycling

Massimo Brunelli (born 27 July 1961) is an Italian former cyclist. He competed in the team pursuit event at the 1984 Summer Olympics.
