= Dean Woods =

Australian cyclist (1966–2022)

Dean Woods OAM
Personal information
- Full name: Dean Anthony Woods
- Nickname: Woodsy
- Born: 22 June 1966 Wangaratta, Australia
- Died: 3 March 2022 (aged 55)
- Height: 1.84 m (6 ft 0 in)
- Weight: 90 kg (198 lb)

Cycling career
- Sport: Cycling
- Discipline: Track
- Role: Rider
- Rider type: Pursuit

Professional teams
- 1989–1991: Stuttgart–Merckx–Gonsor
- 1992: Southern Sun – M.N.E.T.
- 1993: Jayco
Medal record
Men's track cycling
Representing Australia
Olympic Games
Gold medal – first place	1984 Los Angeles	Team pursuit
Silver medal – second place	1988 Seoul	Individual pursuit
Bronze medal – third place	1988 Seoul	Team pursuit
Bronze medal – third place	1996 Atlanta	Team pursuit
Commonwealth Games
Gold medal – first place	1986 Edinburgh	Individual pursuit
Gold medal – first place	1986 Edinburgh	Team pursuit
Silver medal – second place	1986 Edinburgh	10 miles scratch
Gold medal – first place	1994 Victoria BC	Team pursuit
Bronze medal – third place	1994 Victoria BC	Points race

Dean Anthony Woods OAM (22 June 1966 – 3 March 2022) was an Australian racing cyclist from Wangaratta in Victoria known for his track cycling at the Olympic Games and Commonwealth Games. On Australia Day 1985 he was awarded the Order of Australia medal for service to cycling. He was an Australian Institute of Sport scholarship holder.

== Career ==
At the 1984 Summer Olympics in Los Angeles, Woods, with teammates Michael Grenda, Kevin Nichols and Michael Turtur, won the 4000m team pursuit. Critics did not give them much chance. The team was coached by Charlie Walsh and dubbed "Charlie's Angels". In the final the Australians defeated the United States by 3.86 seconds, even though the Australians were riding conventional bikes while the Americans had high-tech machines. Woods told The Border Mail in 2004, "Expectations weren't high for us from the press, but we thought we would do pretty well. We had a close team."

In the 4000m individual pursuit Woods was beaten for bronze by Leonard Nitz (US).

At the 1988 Summer Olympics in Seoul, Wayne McCarney, Stephen McGlede, Scott McGrory, Brett Dutton and Woods won the bronze medal for the team pursuit, defeated by the USSR (gold) and German Democratic Republic (silver). In the individual pursuit Woods won the silver medal.

Woods won a bronze medal in the team pursuit at the 1996 Summer Olympics. At the 1986 Commonwealth Games he won the individual pursuit event. At the 1990 Melbourne to Warrnambool Classic, Woods set the record of 5h 12m or 50.9 km/h for this 265 km race.

Woods established and worked at a bicycle shop, Dean Woods Direct, in Wangaratta but later sold it.

He died from cancer on 3 March 2022, at the age of 55.

== Major results ==
1989
5th Grand Prix Eddy Merckx
8th Overall Tour de Picardie
1990
7th Grand Prix Eddy Merckx
9th Benego Omloop
10th Overall Vuelta a Aragón
1991
4th Overall Tour of Sweden

1st Stage 1a (ITT)

1993
1st Stage 2 Herald Sun Tour

=== Grand Tour general classification results timeline ===
Grand Tour	1990	1991
Vuelta a España	124	112
Giro d'Italia	—	—
Tour de France	—	—

Legend
—	Did not compete
DNF	Did not finish
