= Gary Trevisiol =

Canadian cyclist

Personal information
- Born: 15 November 1959 (age 66) Sudbury, Ontario, Canada

Cycling career
- Sport: Cycling

Gary Trevisiol (born 15 November 1959) is a Canadian former cyclist. He competed in the individual pursuit and points race events at the 1984 Summer Olympics.
