= Ralf Elshof =

Dutch cyclist

Personal information
- Full name: Rafael Robert Christopher Elshof
- Born: 5 July 1962 Wijchen, Netherlands
- Height: 189 cm (6 ft 2 in)
- Weight: 78 kg (172 lb)

Cycling career
- Sport: Cycling

Rafael Robert Christopher "Ralf" Elshof (born 5 July 1962) is a Dutch cyclist. He competed in the men's team pursuit event at the 1984 Summer Olympics, finishing in tenth place.

== Career highlights ==
Between 1983 and 1986, Elshof competed professionally in several European road cycling events. He placed second in a stage of Olympia's Tour in 1983 and participated in races such as 4 Jours de Dunkerque, Tour de l'Oise, and Ronde van Nederland. He rode for teams including Skala and Skala–Skil during his career.

== See also ==
- List of Dutch Olympic cyclists
