= Mary Grigson =

Australian cyclist (born 1971)

Personal information
- Born: Alison Mary Grigson; June 3, 1971 (age 55) Wellington, New Zealand

Cycling career
- Sport: Cycling
Medal record
Commonwealth Games
Bronze medal – third place	2002 Manchester	Cross-country

Mary Grigson (born 3 June 1971) is an Australian cross-country mountain biker.

Grigson participated in the 1996 Summer Olympics in Atlanta coming 15th in the women's Cross-country event. She also competed in the women's Cross-country event at the 2000 Summer Olympics in Sydney where she came 6th.

She won a bronze medal at the 2002 Commonwealth Games in the cross-country event.

She was inducted into the Cycling Australia Hall of Fame in 2016.
