= Derk van Egmond =

Dutch cyclist (born 1956)

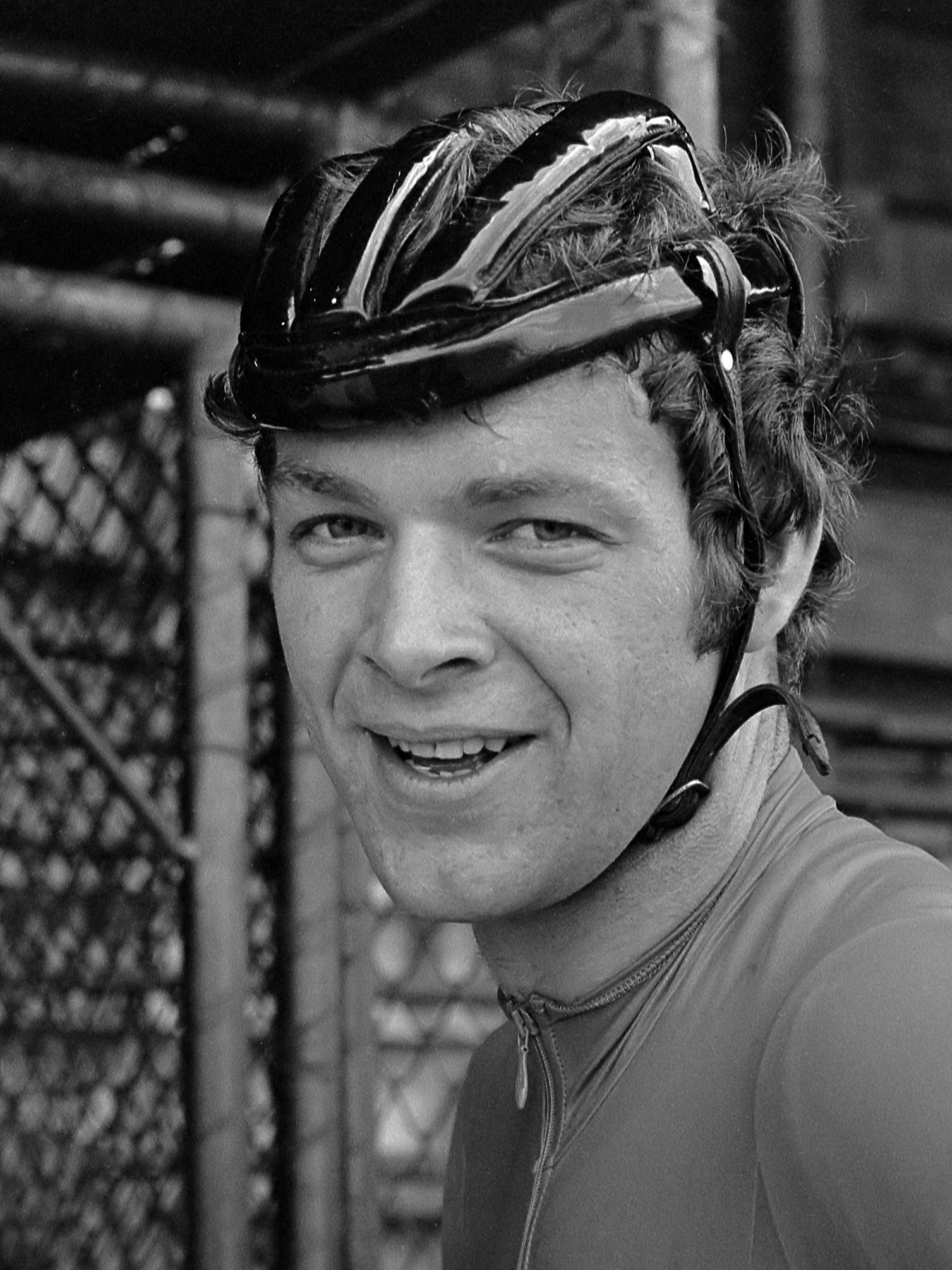
- Derk van Egmond (1978)

Personal information
- Full name: Derk Jan van Egmond
- Born: 30 August 1956 Hellendoorn, Netherlands

Cycling career
- Sport: Cycling
Medal record
Men's track cycling
National Championships
Silver medal – second place	1978	Pursuit
Silver medal – second place	1979	Pursuit
Silver medal – second place	1982	Pursuit
Silver medal – second place	1982	Points race
Bronze medal – third place	1979	Points race
Bronze medal – third place	1982	Pursuit
Bronze medal – third place	1984	Pursuit

Derk Jan "Dick" van Egmond (born 30 August 1956 in Hellendoorn) is a Dutch track cyclist during the 1970s and 1980s who was specialized in the individual pursuit and points race events. He is a seven time national championships medalist

== Career ==
As a junior he became national champion in 1974 and 1975 in Apeldoorn. As a result he was selected for the 1974 European Championships.

His first main achievement was winning the silver medal at the 1978 Dutch National Track Championships in the individual pursuit behind Gerrit Möhlmann. The next year he finished again second in the individual pursuit, this time behind Jos Lammertink, and won the bronze medal in the points race.

Van Egmond was not selected for the 1980 Summer Olympics, as NOC*NSF didn't sent pursuit cyclists. Because of this, he was so pissed off that he quit track cycling and switched to road cycling. He was not unsuccessful on the road, and had a podium finish in a stage already at the 1979 Olympia's Tour.

However, Van Egmond returned to the track. He won in 1980 the international cycling race "Moet & Chandon" in London, UK ahead of René Koppert and British Glen Mitchell. At the Dutch National Track Championships he won a total of silver medals: four silver medals and three bronze medals. Between 1982 and 1984 he was for three consecutive years on the podium at the national chamionships in the individual pursuit and also won the silver medal in the points race in 1983.

In 1983 he had a crash with cyclist Ab Harren in Amsterdam (Sloten). Harren had to go to the hospital, with Van Egmond going injured to the 1983 UCI Track Cycling World Championships in Switzerland.

In 1984 he was selected for the 1984 Summer Olympics in Los Angeles. It seemed that he wouldn’t be able to go because the company he worked for didn’t want to grant him unpaid leave. However, after a request from the NOC, the company responded positively and he was granted unpaid leave. At the Games he was among the team of five for the team pursuit, but was not selected to compete. However, he was selected for the men's points race. In the points race he reached via the semi-final the final where he finished in eighth place.

== See also ==
- List of Dutch Olympic cyclists
