= Manfred Donike =

German cyclist and chemist (1933–1995)

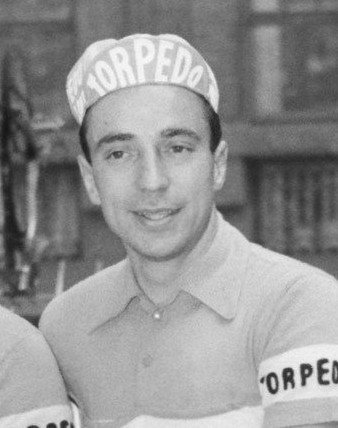
- Manfred Donike (1960)
- Born: 23 August 1933; Köttingen
- Died: 21 August 1995 (aged 61)
- Known for: Detection of drug abuse in sport
- Scientific career
- Fields: Chemistry
- Workplaces: Sport University, Cologne

Manfred Donike (23 August 1933, Köttingen, Rhine Province – 21 August 1995, on a flight from Frankfurt am Main to Johannesburg) was a German cyclist and chemist, known for his research on doping. Donike lived in Rölsdorf.

Donike studied chemistry in Cologne and graduated in 1965. By 1972, Donike had developed a procedure capable of accurate detection of banned substances and their metabolites through analysis, using gas chromatography and mass spectrometry, of urine. In 1977, Donike was hired by the German Sport University Cologne to lead the biochemistry department.

In 1960 and 1961, Donike competed in the Tour de France. His son, also called Manfred, competed at the 1984 Summer Olympics.

Donike died of a heart attack on 21 August 1995 in an aeroplane while en route to Johannesburg, South Africa.
