= Rik Moorman =

Dutch cyclist

Personal information
- Full name: Rikard Moorman
- Born: 3 August 1961 Amsterdam, Netherlands
- Height: 186 cm (6 ft 1 in)
- Weight: 81 kg (179 lb)

Cycling career
- Sport: Cycling
- Disciplines: Track, Road
- Role: Rider

Rikard "Rik" Moorman (born 3 August 1961 in Amsterdam) is a Dutch track and road cyclist. During his career he became multiple times national track cycling champion and stationary bicycle world record holder. He competed at the 1984 Summer Olympics.

== Biography ==
=== Personal life ===
Moorman was born in Amsterdam, where he also lived during his career.

His brother Ralph was also a track cyclist, and they competed together both on the road and track.

=== Career ===
He competed in the men's team pursuit event at the 1984 Summer Olympics, finishing in tenth place.

Moorman started in 1985 as an amateur road cyclist and had twelve victories in his first year. In that year he also became for the second national champion in the madison event with Ragnar Martens, after having won the title a few years earlier with Ab Harren.

The next year in 1986 he had even nineteen victories. In that year he also won on the track the Two Days of Alkmaar.

He was one of the favorite cyclist for the 1986 National Championships in the Derny event. His disqualification in the semi final eliminated him in the final.

In January 1987 he set the 24-hours world record on a stationary bicycle with Jan de Nijs and Piet Vilten with a distance of 3209.6 kilometres, beating the former world record with almost 210 kilometres. The longest distance rode in half-an-hour was by Moorman with 89.9 kilometres.

== See also ==
- List of Dutch Olympic cyclists
- List of people from Amsterdam
