= Mark Whitehead =

American cyclist (1961–2011)

Personal information
- Full name: Mark Scott Whitehead
- Born: February 14, 1961 Bell, California, U.S.
- Died: July 6, 2011 (aged 50) Frisco, Texas, U.S.
- Height: 5 ft 9 in (1.75 m)
- Weight: 165 lb (75 kg)

Cycling career
- Sport: Cycling
- Discipline: Track

Professional team
- 1978–1984: –

Mark Scott Whitehead (February 14, 1961 – July 6, 2011) was an American cyclist. He competed in the men's points race at the 1984 Summer Olympics and won ten National championship titles.

Whitehead was inducted into the Lehigh Valley Velodrome Cycling Hall of Fame.
