= Manfred Donike (cyclist, born 1960) =

German cyclist

Personal information
- Born: 13 June 1960 Erftstadt, West Germany
- Died: 23 February 2003 (aged 42) Kreuzau, Germany

Cycling career
- Sport: Cycling

Manfred Donike (13 June 1960 – 23 February 2003) was a German cyclist. He competed in the points race event at the 1984 Summer Olympics. His father was also a cyclist and a noted chemist.
