= Elisha Hughes =

Antiguan cyclist

Personal information
- Born: 20 January 1959 (age 67)

Cycling career
- Sport: Cycling

Elisha Hughes (born 20 January 1959) is an Antiguan former cyclist. He competed in the points race event at the 1984 Summer Olympics.
