= Mike Turtur Bikeway =

Cycle route in Adelaide, Australia

- Length: 9.8 kilometres (6.1 mi)
- Location: Adelaide, South Australia
- Trailheads: Glenelg; King William Street, Adelaide
- Use: Cycling, walking
- Difficulty: Easy
- Season: All
- Surface: Bitumen, pavers

The Mike Turtur Bikeway is a cycling route adjacent to the Glenelg tram line route connecting Glenelg to the Adelaide central business district. It is a popular commuter route for people who live in the inner suburbs southwest of the city and work in or near the city centre.

The bikeway was named in 2010 in honour of Michael Turtur, an Olympic cycling gold medallist from Adelaide. As of 2016 it ends at South Terrace on the edge of the city centre. The Government of South Australia and Adelaide City Council sought to design a bikeway along King William Street to extend it in to Victoria Square in the heart of the city.

As the bikeway is becoming more popular, a number of infrastructure improvements have been made or proposed to improve the safety and utility of the sections that were poorest. The most significant was a bridge over South Road, though this was closed for about 12 months in 2017-2018 due to structural problems; it re-opened in January 2018. Crossing lights for cyclists were added at Goodwood Road and improved at South Terrace. In a number of places, there is an improved shared path where cyclists previously needed to use a parallel street. In conjunction with other rail upgrades, a bridge is planned over the Adelaide-Worsley and Seaford railway lines at Goodwood railway station.

In September 2026, a 1.4-kilometre-long elevated section opened crossing above South, Marion, Cross and Morphett roads.
