= Mark Noble (cyclist) =

British cyclist

Personal information
- Born: 23 May 1963 (age 63) Hanover, Germany

Cycling career
- Sport: Cycling

Mark Noble (born 23 May 1963) is a British former cyclist. He competed in the team pursuit event at the 1984 Summer Olympics.
