= Akio Kuwazawa =

Japanese cyclist

Personal information
- Born: 22 July 1959 (age 67) Ishikawa, Fukushima, Japan

Cycling career
- Sport: Cycling

Akio Kuwazawa (桑沢 秋雄, Kuwazawa Akio; born 22 July 1959) is a Japanese former cyclist. He competed in the team pursuit and the points race events at the 1984 Summer Olympics.
