= Henning Larsen (cyclist, born 1955) =

Danish cyclist

Personal information
- Born: 12 April 1955 (age 71) Fraugde, Odense, Denmark
- Height: 1.76 m (5 ft 9 in)
- Weight: 67 kg (148 lb)

Cycling career
- Sport: Cycling

Henning L. Larsen (born 12 April 1955) is a Danish retired track cyclist. He competed at the 1984 Summer Olympics in the 4 km individual pursuit and finished in 18th place.

== Career ==
Larsen won his first national title at the 1975 Danish Junior Championships when he won the time trial. In the amateur championships, he then won the 1979 team pursuit title together with Peter Ellegaard, Claus Rasmussen and Lars Johansen. This foursome defended the title in 1980, and in 1981 Larsen won the championship again with Ellegaard, Rasmussen and Stig Larsen. In 1979 he also became champion in the individual pursuit. Up until 1981, he won further medals at the national championships in the sprint, team pursuit and 1000 m time trial. In 1984 he took part in the individual pursuit at the 1984 Summer Olympics in Los Angeles. He competed for the OCK Odense club.
