= Carlos García (cyclist) =

Uruguayan cyclist

Personal information
- Born: 18 September 1964 (age 62)

Cycling career
- Sport: Cycling

Carlos García (born 18 September 1964) is a Uruguayan former cyclist. He competed in the individual pursuit and points race events at the 1984 Summer Olympics.
