= Gary West (cyclist) =

Australian cyclist

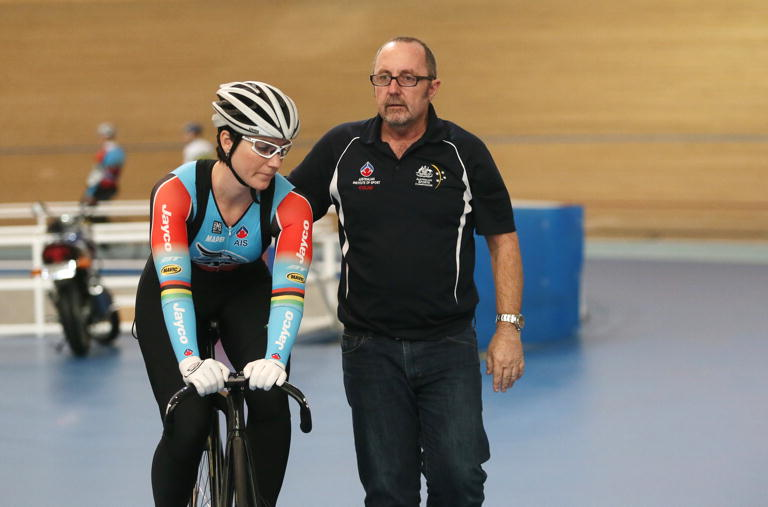
- Australian Institute of Sport Track Cycling Coach Gary West with Olympic Champion Anna Meares in 2013

Personal information
- Born: 8 June 1960 Mildura, Victoria
- Died: 20 August 2017 (aged 57) Adelaide, South Australia

Cycling career
- Sport: Cycling
Medal record
Representing Australia
Men's track cycling
Commonwealth Games
Gold medal – first place	1982 Brisbane	Men's team pursuit

Gary West (8 June 1960 – 20 August 2017) was an Australian Olympic cyclist and track cycling coach.

He competed in the points race event at the 1984 Summer Olympics. He was also an alternate on the gold medal-winning team pursuit squad at the 1984 Games. At the 1982 Commonwealth Games in Brisbane, West won a gold medal as a member of the men's team pursuit.

West had an extensive track cycling coaching career. He worked for the Japan Cycling Federation and the United States Cycling Federation. In 2006, West was appointed Head Cycling Coach at South Australian Sports Institute. In 2008, he was appointed National Head Track Sprint Cycling Coach at the Australian Institute of Sport in Adelaide. He coached Anna Meares to gold and bronze medals at the 2012 Summer Olympics and 2016 Summer Olympics respectively. In October 2016, West stepped down from his national coaching role after being diagnosed with motor neurone disease.

West was a track sprint coach for Australia at the 1998, 2010 and 2014 Commonwealth Games. In 2016, he was awarded AIS Best of the Best at the Australian Institute of Sport Performance Awards.

West died on 20 August 2017 in Adelaide from motor neurone disease, age 57.
