= Michael Turtur =

Former track cyclist

Personal information
- Full name: Michael Colin Turtur
- Born: 2 July 1958 (age 68) Adelaide, South Australia

Cycling career
- Sport: Cycling
- Discipline: Track
- Role: Rider
- Rider type: Pursuit
Medal record
Representing Australia
Men's track cycling
Olympic Games
Gold medal – first place	1984 Los Angeles	Team pursuit
Commonwealth Games
Gold medal – first place	1982 Brisbane	Individual pursuit
Gold medal – first place	1982 Brisbane	Team pursuit
Bronze medal – third place	1982 Brisbane	10 mils scratch

Michael Colin Turtur AO (born 2 July 1958 in Adelaide, South Australia) is a former track cyclist and Olympic gold medallist in the 4000m Team Pursuit at the 1984 Olympics in Los Angeles, with team members Dean Woods, Kevin Nichols and Michael Grenda, coached by Charlie Walsh.

Michael Turtur has competed in the Olympic Games and three Commonwealth Games, winning a total of five medals. At the 1982 Brisbane Commonwealth Games, he won two gold medals in the men’s 4000m teams and individual pursuits, and a bronze medal in the 10 mile scratch race. At the 1986 Edinburgh Commonwealth Games, he was the flag bearer for Australia and won a gold medal in the men’s 4000m team pursuit.

Following his cycling career, Turtur went on to share his knowledge and experience by becoming the South Australian Institute of Sport Cycling Coach for five years. From 1993 Michael Turtur was the manager and promoter of the Adelaide Super-Drome located in South Australia’s State Sports Park, which is the headquarters for the highly successful Australian Institute of Sport’s Women's and Men's Track Cycling Program.

In 2011 he was a State Finalist in the Australian of the Year. Michael Turtur was a television commentator for the Seven Network during its Olympics coverage.

In January 2018 Turtur was made an Officer of the Order of Australia (AO) for "distinguished service to cycling, particularly through the development and promotion of world-class road cycling events, and to the community of South Australia".

The Mike Turtur Bikeway in Adelaide that follows the Glenelg tram line was named in his honour.

== Australian Sports Commission Board ==
Michael Turtur was on the Australian Sports Commission board from 2010 until 2013.

== Union Cycliste Internationale ==
Michael Turtur is on the UCI board on the Management Committee of the Union Cycliste Internationale. He is also president and chair of the track commission.

== Cycling teams ==
Michael Turtur was Section Manager of the 1994 Victoria, Canada, Commonwealth Games Cycling Team, the 1995 World Championships, and the 1996 Atlanta Olympic Games.

== Tour Down Under ==
From the Tour Down Under's inception in 1999 by Michael Turtur, he has been its internationally recognized Race Director. Turtur officially handed over the reins of Race Director to Stuart O'Grady at the end of 2020 race.
