= Roberto Muñoz (cyclist) =

Chilean cyclist

Personal information
- Born: 14 October 1955 (age 71)

Cycling career
- Sport: Cycling

Roberto Muñoz (born 14 October 1955) is a Chilean former cyclist. He competed in the individual road race and the points race events at the 1984 Summer Olympics.
