= Lino Aquea =

Chilean cyclist (born 1962)

Personal information
- Born: 3 October 1962 (age 64)

Cycling career
- Sport: Cycling

Lino Aquea (born 3 October 1962) is a Chilean former cyclist. He competed in the team pursuit event at the 1984 Summer Olympics.
