= Thierry Pata =

French swimmer

Personal information
- Born: 12 February 1965 (age 61)

Sport
- Sport: Swimming

Thierry Pata (born 12 February 1965) is a retired French breaststroke swimmer. He competed in two events at the 1984 Summer Olympics.
