= Michael Marx (cyclist) =

German cyclist

Personal information
- Born: 7 February 1960 (age 66) Hamburg, West Germany

Cycling career
- Sport: Cycling
Medal record
Representing West Germany
Men's track cycling
Olympic Games
Bronze medal – third place	1984 Los Angeles	Team pursuit

Michael Marx (born 7 February 1960) is a German former cyclist. He won the bronze medal in the team pursuit along with Rolf Gölz, Reinhard Alber and Roland Günther in the 1984 Summer Olympics.
