= Denis Pelizzari =

French cyclist

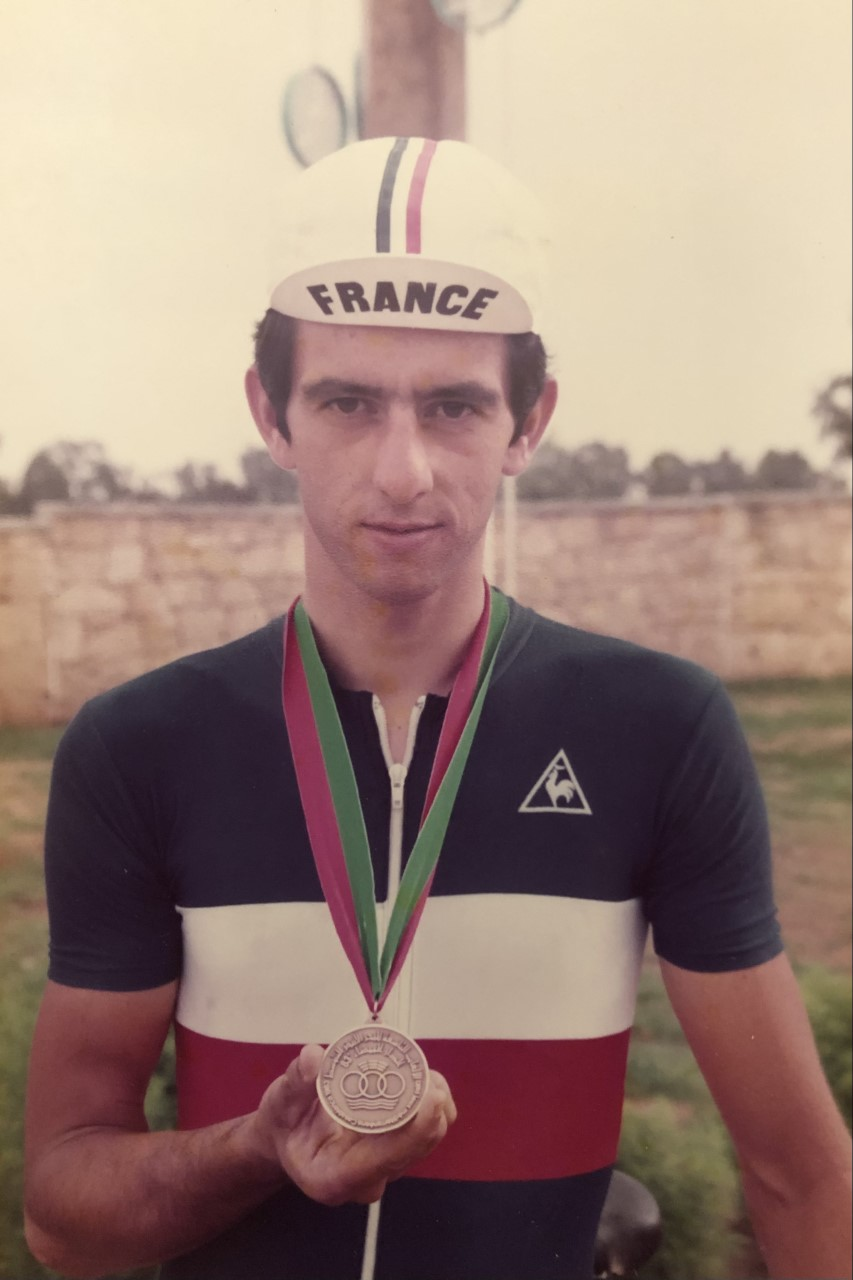
- Portrait of Denis Pelizzari

Personal information
- Born: 11 September 1960 (age 66)

Cycling career
- Sport: Cycling

Denis Pelizzari (born 11 September 1960) is a French former cyclist. He competed at the 1982 and 1983 World Championships and in the individual road race and the team time trial events at the 1984 Summer Olympics.
