= Roland Günther =

German cyclist

Personal information
- Born: 11 December 1962 (age 63) Zwingenberg, Hesse, West Germany

Cycling career
- Sport: Cycling
Medal record
Representing West Germany
Men's track cycling
Olympic Games
Bronze medal – third place	1984 Los Angeles	Team pursuit

Roland Günther (born 11 December 1962) is a German cyclist. He won the bronze medal in the team pursuit along with Rolf Gölz, Reinhard Alber and Michael Marx in the 1984 Summer Olympics.

== Career ==
Roland Günther, who competed as an amateur for RSG Wiesbaden, won accolades as a cyclist, including the runner-up spot in the World Championships in 1982 and the World Championships in 1983 with the German track foursome, as well as a bronze medal in the team pursuit in Los Angeles in 1984. Günther also established himself in the individual pursuit in 1985, winning the bronze medal at the World Championships in Bassano del Grappa with the fastest time of the tournament behind two Soviet and Russian cyclists. In 1985, he won the one-day race Rund um Frankfurt.

In 1987, after the Track World Championships in Vienna, Günther turned professional. He rode for American teams for two years, achieving several victories in Europe and America. During the winter season, he specialized in six-day races. In addition to numerous podium finishes, he crowned his fledgling professional career in his first six-day season by winning the European Championship in the two-man team event in Zurich with his partner Volker Diehl. In 1989, he finished second at the European Championships in the stayer event . In 1992, he also became German stayer champion. In 1993, he ended his active career after 60 six-day races, including two wins and numerous podium finishes.
