= Pierre Andraca =

French swimmer

Personal information
- Born: 25 September 1958 (age 67)

Sport
- Sport: Swimming

Pierre Andraca (born 25 September 1958) is a French former freestyle swimmer. He competed at the 1976 Summer Olympics and the 1984 Summer Olympics.
