= Roberto Calovi =

Italian cyclist

Personal information
- Born: 26 March 1963 (age 63) Mezzolombardo, Italy

Cycling career
- Sport: Cycling

Roberto Calovi (born 26 March 1963) is an Italian former cyclist. He competed in the individual pursuit event at the 1984 Summer Olympics.
