= Glenn Clarke =

Australian cyclist (born 1963)

Personal information
- Born: 26 July 1963 (age 63) Wangaratta, Australia

Cycling career
- Sport: Cycling
Medal record
Men's track cycling
Representing Australia
Commonwealth Games
Gold medal – first place	1986 Edinburgh	Team pursuit

Glenn Clarke (born 26 July 1963) is an Australian former cyclist. He competed in the points race event at the 1984 Summer Olympics finishing in 6th position.

Clarke was a member of the team pursuit that won a gold medal at the 1986 Commonwealth Games.

Clarke won the 1990 Wangaratta Wheelrace at the Wangaratta Showgrounds.
