= Reinhard Alber =

German cyclist (born 1964)

Personal information
- Born: 6 February 1964 (age 62) Singen, West Germany

Cycling career
- Sport: Cycling
Medal record
Representing West Germany
Men's track cycling
Olympic Games
Bronze medal – third place	1984 Los Angeles	Team pursuit

Reinhard Alber (born 6 February 1964) is a German former cyclist. He won the bronze medal in the team pursuit along with Rolf Gölz, Roland Günther and Michael Marx in the 1984 Summer Olympics.
