= Harumitsu Okada =

Japanese cyclist

Personal information
- Born: 4 October 1960 (age 66) Hiroshima, Japan

Cycling career
- Sport: Cycling

Harumitsu Okada (岡田 晴光, Okada Haramitsu; born 4 October 1960) is a Japanese former cyclist. He competed in the team pursuit event at the 1984 Summer Olympics.
