= Dominique Bataille =

French swimmer

Personal information
- Born: 29 October 1963 (age 62)

Sport
- Sport: Swimming

Dominique Bataille (born 29 October 1963) is a retired French freestyle swimmer. He competed in two events at the 1984 Summer Olympics.
