= Uwe Messerschmidt =

German cyclist (born 1962)

Personal information
- Full name: Uwe Messerschmidt
- Born: 22 January 1962 (age 64) Schwäbisch Gmünd, West Germany

Cycling career
- Sport: Cycling
- Discipline: Track
- Role: Rider
Medal record
Men's cycling
Representing West Germany
Olympic Games
Silver medal – second place	1984 Los Angeles	Points Race

Uwe Messerschmidt (born 22 January 1962) is a retired track cyclist and road bicycle racer from Germany, who was a professional rider from 1993 to 1997. He represented West Germany at the 1984 Summer Olympics in Los Angeles, California, where he won the silver medal in the men's points race behind Belgium's Roger Ilegems.
