= Pascal Robert =

French cyclist

Personal information
- Born: 22 October 1963 (age 62) Valence, Drôme, France

Cycling career
- Sport: Cycling

Pascal Robert (born 22 October 1963) is a French former cyclist. He competed in the individual pursuit and team pursuit events at the 1984 Summer Olympics.
