= Michel Pou =

French swimmer

Personal information
- Born: 3 October 1965 (age 60) Nice, France

Sport
- Sport: Swimming

Michel Pou (born 3 October 1965) is a French freestyle swimmer. He competed at the 1984 Summer Olympics and the 1988 Summer Olympics.
