= Hubert Seiz =

Swiss cyclist (born 1960)

Personal information
- Born: 23 August 1960 (age 66) Arbon, Switzerland

Cycling career
- Sport: Cycling
- Current team: Retired
- Discipline: Road
- Role: Rider

Professional teams
- 1982–1985: Cilo-Aufina
- 1986: Hitachi-Marc-Splendor
- 1987: Supermercati Brianzoli-Chateau d'Ax
- 1988–1989: Bleiker – Mondia

Hubert "Hubi" Seiz (born 23 August 1960) is a former Swiss racing cyclist. He competed in the individual road race event at the 1980 Summer Olympics. He was the Swiss National Road Race champion in 1988.

He now works as a driving instructor (car and motorbike) in Uttwil, Switzerland, as well as providing WAB instruction (mandatory course after obtaining a Swiss driving licence) at the driving school "Driving Park" in Winterthur, Switzerland.

== Palmares ==
1982
2nd Züri-Metzgete
3rd Grand Prix de Cannes
4th Volta a Catalunya
1983
1st stage 7 Tour de Suisse
3rd La Flèche Wallonne
1984
2nd Züri-Metzgete
2nd Swiss National Road Race Championships
4th World Road Championships
1985
1st stage 4 Giro d'Italia
6th Tour de Suisse
1986
1st Giro dell'Emilia
1st stage 7 Grand Prix Guillaume Tell
9th Liège–Bastogne–Liège
1988
National Road Champion
