= Fernando Santís =

Chilean footballer (born 1958)

Personal information
- Full name: Augusto Fernando Santís Ahumada
- Date of birth: 10 January 1958 (age 68)
- Place of birth: Casablanca, Chile
- Position: Forward

Senior career*
Years	Team	Apps	(Gls)
1978–1980	San Antonio Unido		
1981	Cobresal		
1982	Unión La Calera		
1983–1984	Magallanes	31	(23)
1984–1986	Las Palmas	33	(9)
1985	→ Universidad Católica (loan)	24	(8)
1986–1987	Portimonense	4	(0)
1987–1989	Cartagena	48	(16)

International career
1984	Chile Olympic	9	(3)
- * Club domestic league appearances and goals

Augusto Fernando Santís Ahumada (born 10 January 1958), known as Fernando Santís, is a Chilean former professional footballer who played as a forward.

== Career ==
After playing for San Antonio Unido, Cobresal and Unión La Calera in the second level of the Chilean football, Santís joined Magallanes in the top level, moving to Spanish side Las Palmas in the second half of 1984, where he coincided with his compatriot Jorge Contreras. He is a remembered player due to the fact that he scored against both Barcelona and Real Madrid. In 1985, he was loaned to Universidad Católica.

After leaving Las Palmas, he played for Portimonense and Cartagena, his last club.

At international level, he represented Chile in 1984 at both the Pre-Olympic Tournament and the Olympic Football Tournament in Los Angeles, United States.
