= Eduardo Cuevas =

Chilean cyclist

Personal information
- Born: 20 June 1951 (age 75)

Cycling career
- Sport: Cycling

Eduardo Cuevas (born 20 June 1951) is a Chilean former cyclist. He competed in the individual pursuit and team pursuit events at the 1984 Summer Olympics.
