= Didier Garcia =

French cyclist

Personal information
- Born: 23 May 1964 (age 62) Le Blanc-Mesnil, Seine-Saint-Denis, France

Cycling career
- Sport: Cycling

Didier Garcia (born 23 May 1964) is a French former cyclist. He competed in the team pursuit and the points race events at the 1984 Summer Olympics.
