= Michael Grenda =

Australian cyclist (born 1962)

Personal information
- Full name: Michael Ronald Grenda
- Born: 24 April 1962 (age 64)

Cycling career
- Sport: Cycling
- Disciplines: Track & Road
- Role: Rider
Medal record
Representing Australia
Men's cycling
Olympic Games
Gold medal – first place	1984 Los Angeles	4.000m Team Pursuit

Michael Ronald Grenda, OAM (born 24 April 1962) is a retired road bicycle and track cyclist from Australia, who represented his native country at the 1984 Summer Olympics in Los Angeles, California. There he won the gold medal in the men's 4000m team pursuit, alongside Dean Woods, Kevin Nichols, and Michael Turtur. He was a professional cyclist from 1986 to 1991. He graduated from the Tasmanian Police Academy in 2014.
