= Pascal Potié =

French cyclist

Personal information
- Born: 15 March 1964 (age 62) Seclin, France

Cycling career
- Sport: Cycling

Pascal Potié (born 15 March 1964) is a French former cyclist. He competed at the 1984, 1988 and 1992 Summer Olympics.
