= Brent Emery =

American cyclist (born 1957)

Personal information
- Born: September 15, 1957 (age 69) Milwaukee, Wisconsin, U.S.

Cycling career
- Sport: Cycling
Medal record
Men's cycling
Representing United States
Olympic Games
Silver medal – second place	1984 Los Angeles	Team pursuit

Brent Emery (born September 15, 1957) was a cyclist for the United States at the 1984 Summer Olympics in Los Angeles, California, where he won a silver medal in the team pursuit. He is now a business owner and cycling advocate in the metro Milwaukee area. He married Julie Emery (Fluet) on August 3, 1985 after meeting her at the 1984 Los Angeles Olympics where she came to watch her brother, Steve Hegg win a gold and silver medal, also in cycling. They live in Menomonee Falls, Wi and have two children, John Robert Emery and Ashley Emery, and two grandchildren Lexus and Lola Emery.

== Cycling career ==
Emery began racing bicycles in 1973. At 18 years old, he was a regional qualifier for the 1976 Olympic trials in the sprint event, though he did not participate in the final trials. He won the 1980 Olympic trials in the 1 km event. Because of the boycott of the Moscow Olympic Games by the U.S. team, no American athletes went to Moscow.

He won seven USA National Championships: two in the USAC 1 km event (1980 & 1981) and the USAC Points Race 1983. Four championships came in the ABR (American Bicycle Racing) National Championships in the Masters Division. In 1981, Emery set a world mark for the fastest average speed in races over 100 miles by winning the 10th stage of the Tour of Chile in 3h 33min 25 sec for the 174 km (108 miles), a 30.2 mph average speed. This mark, which was the fastest in the world up to that point for amateurs and professional cyclists, stood for about 15 years. When he was active on the international cycling circuit, he competed in a total of 19 countries.

In 1984, he again made the U.S. Olympic team, receiving a silver medal, from his teammate Dave Grylls, in the Los Angeles Olympics in the 4000 meter Team Pursuit event.

Emery won overall titles at the International Cycling Classic in 2009 and 2010 for the 35+ age group. He placed 6th in three events (750m TT, Points Race and Team Sprint) at the 2007 World Masters Cycling Track Championships in Sydney, Australia. The last pro level bicycle race that he place in the prize money was in the Giro De Grafton in 2013 at the age of 56.

After 45 years of continuous bicycle racing, in June 2016, Brent entered his last pro bicycle race at the age of 59, retiring from competitive racing. He was diagnosed with atrial fibrillation and a leaking mitral heart valve. He is still quite active in the bicycle, triathlon and running community, but cannot push efforts to get his heart rate to a high level.

== Doping Scandal ==
In 1984 it was confirmed that Brent along with 7 other teammates of the 1984 US Olympic Cycling Team participated in blood doping - a practice banned by the IOC/USOC.

== Cycling business ==
Emery co-owns Emery's Cycling, Triathlon, & Fitness Shops in Milwaukee, Wisconsin with his brother, Bennett Emery. The business was founded by his parents in 1963. Their business is regularly voted as Milwaukee's best bicycle shop. They have been awarded as a Top 100 bicycle retailer in the USA and a Top 50 Triathlon retailer.

Emery has also been involved in the design of cycling equipment. In 1981, he designed the first of what would later be called the funny bikes that propelled the USA to a record medal haul at the 1984 Olympics. That bike, built to Emery's specifications by John Stinsmen of Allentown, Pennsylvania helped persuade the U.S. Cycling Federation (now USA Cycling) to build the fastest bikes in the world.

In 1982, Emery was the first rider from the USA to ride a disc wheel, which was made for the USA team by aerodynamics expert Chester Kyle. In 1987, Emery became involved in the development of a new style of aerodynamic handlebars.

Emery has worked on bicycle fitting and equipment for many years. His concepts, along with that of other cycling industry professionals (Frank Day, Leonard Zinn, High Sierra Cycles etc.) influenced some bicycle companies to put shorter cranks on production bicycles for short riders, especially for the triathlon.

Through their cycling business, Emery has been active in designing bicycles for the disabled of all ages, and in particular youths. The modifications he has designed are groundbreaking in the medical / physical therapy community and in the bicycle industry. Some manufacturers of adaptive bicycles are changing their products based on Brent's designs and input. Emerys company will be going into production on some of the items they re-manufacture to sell to other bicycle dealers as well as the public. Emery has volunteered for Variety: The Children's Charity, adapting bicycles for children with special needs. In 2011, Variety International presented him with an award for service at its world conference.
