= Roger Ilegems =

Belgian cyclist

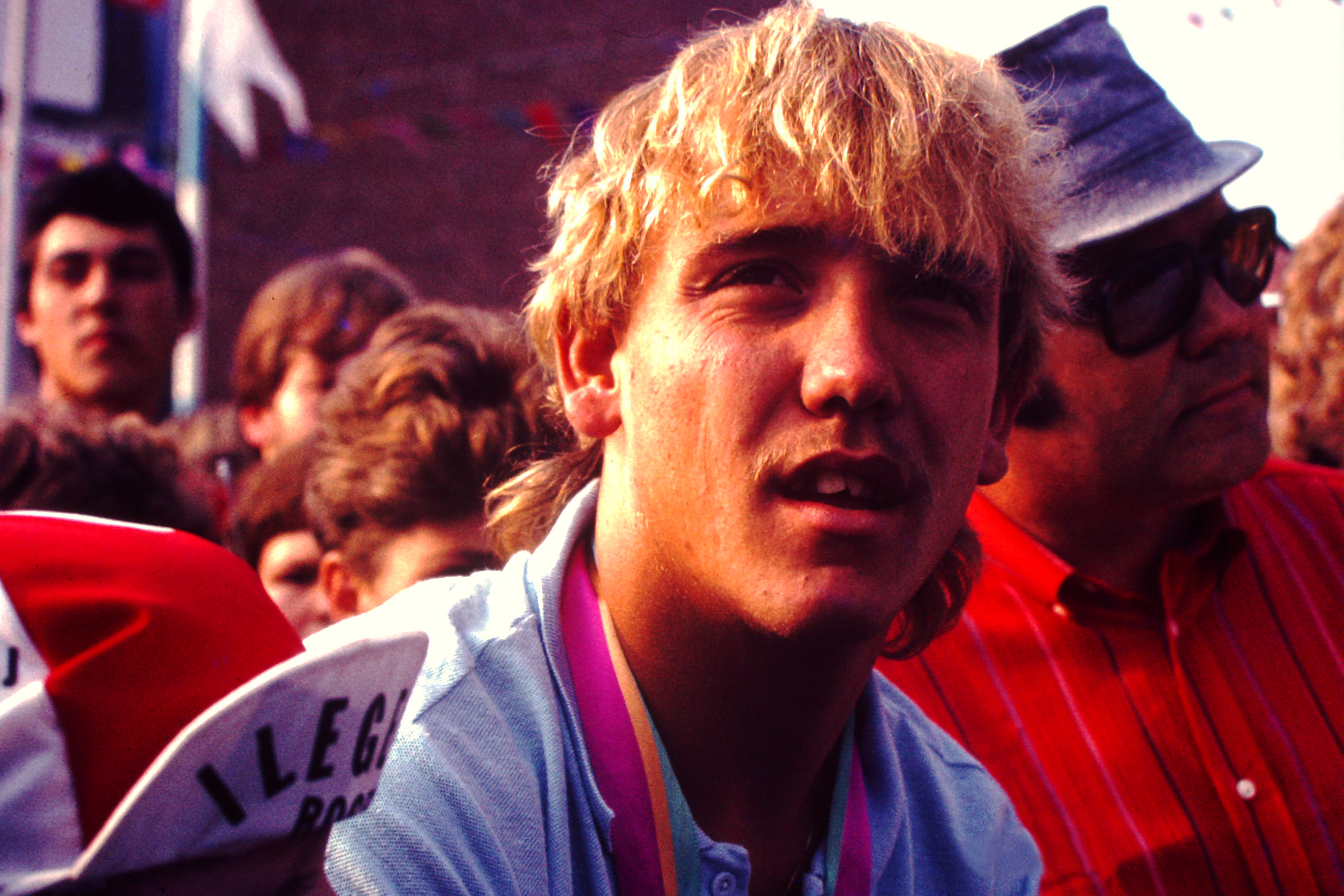
- Ilegems wearing his gold medal in Hemiksem on his return from the 1984 Summer Olympics

Personal information
- Born: 13 December 1962 (age 63) Niel, Belgium

Cycling career
- Sport: Cycling
- Disciplines: Road and track
Medal record
Men's cycling
Representing Belgium
Olympic Games
Gold medal – first place	1984 Los Angeles	Points Race

Roger Ilegems (born 13 December 1962) is a retired track cyclist and road bicycle racer from Belgium, who was a professional rider from 1984 to 1991. He represented his native country at the 1984 Summer Olympics in Los Angeles, California, where he won the gold medal in the men's points race.

== Teams ==
- 1984: Tönissteiner-Lotto (Belgium, from 1 December 1984)
- 1985: Lotto-Merckx (Belgium)
- 1986: Lotto-Merckx (Belgium)
- 1987: Sigma (Belgium)
- 1988: Sigma (Belgium)
- 1989: Histor-Sigma (Belgium)
- 1991: Collstrop-Isoglass (Belgium)
