= Miguel Droguett =

Chilean cyclist

Personal information
- Born: 8 May 1961 (age 65) Santiago, Chile

Cycling career
- Sport: Cycling
Medal record
Representing Chile
Pan American Games
Bronze medal – third place	1991 Havana	Individual pursuit

Miguel Ángel Droguett Hidalgo (born 8 May 1961) is a Chilean former cyclist. He competed at the 1984 Summer Olympics and the 1992 Summer Olympics. He is the son of Hector Droguett.
