= Éric Louvel =

French cyclist (born 1962)

Personal information
- Born: 31 May 1962 (age 64) Dieppe, France

Cycling career
- Sport: Cycling
- Role: Rider

Éric Louvel (born 31 May 1962) is a French former professional racing cyclist. He rode in the 1986 Tour de France and the 1985 Vuelta a España. He also competed in three events at the 1984 Summer Olympics.
