= Steve Hegg =

American cyclist (born 1963)

Personal information
- Full name: Stephen Edward Hegg
- Born: December 3, 1963 (age 62) Dana Point, California, U.S.
- Height: 1.78 m (5 ft 10 in)
- Weight: 70 kg (154 lb)

Cycling career
- Sport: Cycling
- Current team: Retired
- Disciplines: Road; Track
- Role: Rider

Professional teams
- 1988: Sunkyong–SKC
- 1990–1991: Subaru–Montgomery
- 1992–1996: Chevrolet–L.A. Sheriff
- 1997: Saturn
- 1998: Shaklee
- 1999–2000: Ikon–Lexus
Medal record
Men's track cycling
Representing United States
Olympic Games
Gold medal – first place	1984 Los Angeles	Individual pursuit
Silver medal – second place	1984 Los Angeles	Team pursuit

Stephen Edward Hegg (born December 3, 1963) is a retired track cyclist and road bicycle racer from the United States, who was a professional rider from 1988 to 2000. He represented the US at the 1984 Summer Olympics in Los Angeles, California, where he won the gold medal in the 4000m individual pursuit and silver in the 4000m team pursuit.

In road bicycle racing, Hegg became the first three-time winner of the United States national individual time trial championship, winning the elite men's race in 1990, 1995 and 1996. In 1994, Hegg captured the United States national road race championship.

== Major results ==
1984
Olympic Games

1st Individual pursuit
1st Team pursuit

1st Individual pursuit, National Track Championships
1987
1st Team time trial (with Kent Bostick, John Frey & Andrew Paulin), Pan American Games
1989
1st Individual pursuit, National Track Championships
1990
1st Time trial, National Road Championships
1992
1st Stage 11 Tour DuPont
1993
1st Stage 5 Cascade Cycling Classic
1st Prologue (ITT) Redlands Bicycle Classic
10th Overall Tour DuPont
1994
1st Stage 3 Redlands Bicycle Classic
1995
1st Time trial, National Road Championships
3rd Overall Tour of China

1st Prologue

4th Overall West Virginia Classic

1st Stage 3 (ITT)

1996
1st Time trial, National Road Championships
1998
2nd Manhattan Beach Grand Prix
1999
2nd Time trial, National Road Championships
2000
3rd Time trial, National Road Championships
