= Leonard Nitz =

American track cyclist (born 1956)

Personal information
- Born: September 30, 1956 (age 70) Hamilton, Ohio, United States

Cycling career
- Sport: Cycling
Medal record
Men's cycling
Representing the United States
Olympic Games
Silver medal – second place	1984 LA	Team Pursuit
Bronze medal – third place	1984 LA	Individual Pursuit
Pan American Games
Bronze medal – third place	1987 Indianapolis	Time Trial

Leonard Harvey Nitz (born September 30, 1956) is a retired track cyclist from the United States. He won the silver medal in the 4000m team pursuit and bronze in the 4000m individual pursuit at the 1984 Summer Olympics in Los Angeles, California. Nitz was the bronze medalist in the Amateur Points Race at the 1986 UCI Track Cycling World Championships in Colorado Springs, Colorado. He is the coach of cyclist James Hibbard.
