= Kevin Nichols =

Australian cyclist (born 1955)

Personal information
- Full name: Kevin John Nichols
- Born: 4 July 1955 (age 71) Grafton, New South Wales, Australia

Cycling career
- Sport: Cycling
- Discipline: Track
- Role: Rider
- Rider type: Pursuit
Medal record
Representing Australia
Men's track cycling
Olympic Games
Gold medal – first place	1984 Los Angeles	Team pursuit
Commonwealth Games
Gold medal – first place	1982 Brisbane	Team Pursuit
Gold medal – first place	1982 Brisbane	Men's 10 Mile Scratch Race
Gold medal – first place	1978 Edmonton	Team Pursuit
Silver medal – second place	1974 Christchurch	Team Pursuit

Kevin John Nichols OAM (born 4 July 1955 in Grafton, New South Wales) is a former track cyclist and Olympic gold medallist.

His daughter, Kate Nichols, is a road racing cyclist.

== Career ==
At the 1984 Summer Olympics, in Los Angeles, Nichols was a member of the gold winning pursuit team. Nichols also competed at the 1976 Summer Olympics and 1980 Summer Olympics.

Nichols won the Goulburn to Sydney Classic in 1993.
