= Netherlands at the 1984 Summer Olympics =

- Flag of the Netherlands
- IOC code: NED (HOL used at these Games)
- NOC: Dutch Olympic Committee

in Los Angeles
- Competitors: 136 (82 men and 54 women) in 15 sports
- Flag bearer: Ton Buunk
- Medals Ranked 13th: Gold 5 Silver 2 Bronze 6 Total 13

Summer Olympics appearances (overview)
- 1900; 1904; 1908; 1912; 1920; 1924; 1928; 1932; 1936; 1948; 1952; 1956; 1960; 1964; 1968; 1972; 1976; 1980; 1984; 1988; 1992; 1996; 2000; 2004; 2008; 2012; 2016; 2020; 2024

Other related appearances
- 1906 Intercalated Games

The Netherlands competed at the 1984 Summer Olympics in Los Angeles, United States. 136 competitors, 82 men and 54 women, took part in 74 events in 15 sports.

== Medalists ==
Medal	Name	Sport	Event	Date
Gold	Petra van Staveren	Swimming	Women's 100 metre breaststroke	2 August
Gold	Jolanda de Rover	Swimming	Women's 200 metre backstroke	4 August
Gold	Stephan van den Berg	Sailing	Windglider	8 August
Gold	Netherlands women's national field hockey team: Det de Beus; Alette Pos; Margriet Zegers; Laurien Willemse; Marjolein Eijsvogel; Fieke Boekhorst; Carina Benninga; Sandra Le Poole; Elsemieke Hillen; Marieke van Doorn; Sophie von Weiler; Aletta van Manen; Irene Hendriks; Lisette Sevens; Martine Ohr; Anneloes Nieuwenhuizen	Field hockey	Women's tournament	10 August
Gold	Ria Stalman	Athletics	Women's discus throw	11 August
Silver	Desi Reijers; Conny van Bentum; Annemarie Verstappen; Elles Voskes	Swimming	Women's 4 × 100 metre freestyle relay	31 July
Silver	Greet Hellemans; Nicolette Hellemans	Rowing	Women's double sculls	4 August
Bronze	Annemarie Verstappen	Swimming	Women's 100 metre freestyle	29 July
Bronze	Annemarie Verstappen	Swimming	Women's 200 metre freestyle	30 July
Bronze	Jolanda de Rover	Swimming	Women's 100 metre backstroke	31 July
Bronze	Lynda Cornet; Greet Hellemans; Nicolette Hellemans; Catalien Neelissen; Marty Laurijsen; Anne-Marie Quist; Wiljon Vaandrager; Marieke van Drogenbroek; Harriet van Ettekoven	Rowing	Women's eight	4 August
Bronze	Arnold Vanderlijde	Boxing	Men's heavyweight	9 August
Bronze	Annemiek Derckx	Canoeing	Women's K-1 500 metres	10 August

== Archery ==
Both of the Dutch archers from the 1980 competition returned in 1984. Both shot much higher scores than they had four years earlier, but the field was more competitive with the return of many nations that had boycotted, and both dropped out of the top eight.

Women's Individual Competition:

- Catherina Floris – 2422 points (→ 23rd place)

Men's Individual Competition:

- Martinus Reniers – 2486 points (→ 13th place)

== Athletics ==
Men's 5,000 metres

- Stijn Jaspers

- Heat — 13:58.51 (→ did not advance)

Men's 3,000m Steeplechase

- Hans Koeleman

Men's Marathon

- Cor Vriend

- Final — 2:21:08 (→ 39th place)

- Gerard Nijboer

- Final — did not finish (→ no ranking)

- Cor Lambregts

- Final — did not finish (→ no ranking)

Men's Shot Put

- Erik de Bruin

- Qualifying Round — 19.28 m
- Final — 19.65 m (→ 8th place)

Women's 100 metres

- Els Vader

- Heat 1 — 11.43s
- Heat 2 — 11.56s (→ did not advance)

Women's 1,500 metres

- Elly van Hulst

- Heat — 4:10.69
- Final — 4:11.58 (→ 12th place)

Women's Marathon

- Carla Beurskens

- Final — 2:37:51 (→ 22nd place)

Women's 400m Hurdles

- Olga Commandeur

- Heat — 56.67
- Semifinal — 57.01 (→ did not advance)

Women's Discus Throw

- Ria Stalman

- Qualifying Heat — 58.28m
- Final — 65.36m (→ Gold Medal)

Women's Long Jump

- Tineke Hidding

- Qualification — did not start (→ did not advance, no ranking)

Women's High Jump

- Marjon Wijnsma

- Qualification — did not start (→ did not advance)

Women's Heptathlon

- Tineke Hidding

- Final Result — 6147 points (→ 7th place)

- Marjon Wijnsma

- Final Result — 6015 points (→ 11th place)

== Boxing ==
Men's Middleweight (– 75 kg)

- Pedro van Raamsdonk
  1. First Round – Defeated Augustus Oga (Kenya), on points (4:1)
  2. Second Round – Defeated Noe Cruciani (Italy), on points (5:0)
  3. Quarterfinals – Lost to Arístides González (Puerto Rico), on points (1:4)

Men's Heavyweight (– 91 kg)

- Arnold Vanderlyde → Bronze Medal
  1. First Round – Bye
  2. Second Round – Defeated Egerton Forster (SLE), on points (4:1)
  3. Quarterfinals – Defeated Georgios Stefanopoulos (GRE), on points (5:0)
  4. Semifinals – Lost to Willie DeWit (CAN), on points (3:2)

== Canoeing ==
Men's K-2 (500 metres)

- Gert Jan Lebbink
- Ron Stevens

Men's K-2 (1,000 metres)

- Gert Jan Lebbink
- Ron Stevens

Women's K-1 (500 metres)

- Annemiek Derckx

== Cycling ==
Sixteen cyclists, thirteen men and three women, represented the Netherlands in 1984.

Men's individual road race

- Jean-Paul van Poppel — +22:20 (→ 44th place)
- Hans Daams — did not finish (→ no ranking)
- Twan Poels — did not finish (→ no ranking)
- Nico Verhoeven — did not finish (→ no ranking)

Team time trial

- Jos Alberts
- Erik Breukink
- Maarten Ducrot
- Gert Jakobs

Individual pursuit

- Jelle Nijdam

Team pursuit

- Ralf Elshof
- Rik Moorman
- Jelle Nijdam
- Marco van der Hulst

Points race

- Derk van Egmond

Women's individual road race

- Leontine van der Lienden — +10:49 (→ 28th place)
- Hennie Top — +18:12 (→ 37th place)
- Thea van Rijnsoever — +18:12 (→ 39th place)

== Diving ==
Women's 3m Springboard

- Daphne Jongejans — 437.40 points (→ 10th place)

== Equestrianism ==
Mixed Dressage Individual

- Annemarie Sanders
- Tineke Bartels
- Jo Rutten

Mixed Dressage Team

- Annemarie Sanders
- Tineke Bartels
- Jo Rutten

== Field hockey ==
=== Men's team competition ===
- Preliminary round (group B)

- Defeated Canada (4-1)
- Defeated New Zealand (3-1)
- Drew with Pakistan (3-3)
- Lost to Great Britain (3-4)
- Defeated Kenya (3-0)

- Classification Matches

- 5th/8th place: Defeated Spain (0-0) after penalty strokes (10-4)
- 5th/6th place: Lost to India (2-5) → 6th place

- Team roster

- Peter van Asbeck
- Ewout van Asbeck
- Lex Bos (gk)
- Roderik Bouwman
- Cees Jan Diepeveen
- Theo Doyer
- Maarten van Grimbergen
- Arno den Hartog
- Tom van 't Hek
- Pierre Hermans (gk)
- René Klaassen
- Hans Kruize
- Hidde Kruize
- Ties Kruize
- Eric Pierik
- Ron Steens

- Head coach: Wim van Heumen

=== Women's team competition ===
- Round robin

- Defeated New Zealand (2-1)
- Defeated United States (2-1)
- Defeated West Germany (6-2)
- Drew with Canada (2-2)
- Defeated Australia (2-0) → Gold Medal

- Team roster

- Carina Benninga
- Fieke Boekhorst
- Marjolein Eijsvogel
- Det de Beus (gk)
- Irene Hendriks
- Elsemiek Hillen
- Sandra Le Poole
- Anneloes Nieuwenhuizen
- Martine Ohr
- Alette Pos (gk)
- Lisette Sevens
- Marieke van Doorn
- Aletta van Manen
- Sophie von Weiler
- Laurien Willemse
- Margriet Zegers

- Head coach: Gijs van Heumen

== Judo ==
Men's Half-Middleweight

- Rob Henneveld
- Magnus Büchel

Men's Middleweight

- Ben Spijkers

Men's Heavyweight

- Willy Wilhelm

== Rowing ==
Men's single sculls

- Herman van den Eerenbeemt (eliminated in the repechage)

Men's coxless pairs

- Sjoerd Hoekstra, Joost Adema (7th)

Men's quadruple sculls

- Steven van Groningen, Nico Rienks, Frans Göbel, Mark Emke (9th)

Women's single sculls

- Jos Compaan (8th)

Women's double sculls

- Greet Hellemans, Nicolette Hellemans Silver

Women's coxless pairs

- Harriet van Ettekoven, Lynda Cornet (4th)

Women's coxed fours

- Marieke van Drogenbroek, Anne-Marie Quist, Catalien Neelissen, Wiljon Vaandrager, Marty Laurijsen (5th)

Women's eights

- Nicolette Hellemans, Lynda Cornet, Harriet van Ettekoven, Greet Hellemans, Marieke van Drogenbroek, Anne-Marie Quist, Catalien Neelissen, Wiljon Vaandrager, Marty Laurijsen Bronze

== Swimming ==
Men's 100m Freestyle

- Hans Kroes

- Heat — 51.19
- B-Final — 51.64 (→ 13th place)

- Edsard Schlingemann

- Heat — 51.33
- B-Final — 51.74 (→ 15th place)

Men's 200m Freestyle

- Frank Drost

- Heat — 1:51.32
- Final — 1:51.62 (→ 6th place)

- Hans Kroes

- Heat — 1:52.37
- B-Final — 1:52.36 (→ 11th place)

Men's 100m Backstroke

- Hans Kroes

- Heat — 57.48
- Final — 58.07 (→ 8th place)

Men's 100m Butterfly

- Cees Vervoorn

- Heat — 55.46
- B-Final — 55.75 (→ 14th place)

- Gérard de Kort

- Heat — 56.55 (→ did not advance, 24th place)

Men's 200m Butterfly

- Frank Drost

- Heat — 2:01.18
- B-Final — 2:01.23 (→ 10th place)

- Gérard de Kort

- Heat — 2:00.83
- B-Final — 2:01.30 (→ 13th place)

Men's 200m Individual Medley

- Edsard Schlingemann

- Heat — 2:08.27 (→ did not advance, 18th place)

Men's 4 × 100 m Freestyle Relay

- Edsard Schlingemann, Peter Drost, Frank Drost, and Hans Kroes

- Heat — 3:27.60 (→ did not advance, 11th place)

Men's 4 × 200 m Freestyle Relay

- Hans Kroes, Peter Drost, Edsard Schlingemann, and Frank Drost

- Heat — 7:29.14
- Final — 7:26.72 (→ 7th place)

Women's 100m Freestyle

- Annemarie Verstappen

- Heat — 56.11
- Final — 56.08 (→ Bronze Medal)

- Conny van Bentum

- Heat — 56.94
- Final — 56.43 (→ 4th place)

Women's 200m Freestyle

- Annemarie Verstappen

- Heat — 2:01.61
- Final — 1:59.69 (→ Bronze Medal)

- Conny van Bentum

- Heat — 2:01.52
- Final — 2:00.59 (→ 5th place)

Women's 400m Freestyle

- Jolande van der Meer

- Heat — 4:16.65
- Final — 4:16.05 (→ 6th place)

Women's 800m Freestyle

- Jolande van der Meer

- Heat — 8:46.58
- Final — 8:42.86 (→ 6th place)

Women's 100m Backstroke

- Jolanda de Rover

- Heat — 1:02.94
- Final — 1:02.91 (→ Bronze Medal)

- Brigitte van der Lans

- Heat — 1:04.57
- Swimm-Off — 1:04.82
- B-Final — 1:04.75 (→ 12th place)

Women's 200m Backstroke

- Jolanda de Rover

- Heat — 2:13.50
- Final — 2:12.38 (→ Gold Medal)

- Brigitte van der Lans

- Heat — 2:20.63 (→ did not advance, 17th place)

Women's 100m Breaststroke

- Petra Hillenius

- Heat — 1:14.09 (→ did not advance, 19th place)

- Petra van Staveren

- Heat — 1:11.18
- Final — 1:09.88 OR (→ Gold Medal)

Women's 200m Breaststroke

- Petra Hillenius

- Heat — 2:41.57 (→ did not advance, 18th place)

- Petra van Staveren

- Heat — 2:37.20
- Final — 2:36.32 in B final (→ 10th place)

Women's 100m Butterfly

- Conny van Bentum

- Heat — 1:02.01
- Final — 1:01.94 (→ 7th place)

- Annemarie Verstappen

- Heat — 1:01.50
- Final — 1:01.56 (→ 4th place)

Women's 200m Butterfly

- Conny van Bentum

- Heat — 2:13.74
- Swim-Off — 2:13.60
- Final — 2:17.39 (→ 8th place)

Women's 4 × 100 m Freestyle Relay

- Annemarie Verstappen, Elles Voskes, Desi Reijers, and Wilma van Velsen

- Heat — 3:47.65

- Annemarie Verstappen, Elles Voskes, Desi Reijers, and Conny van Bentum

- Final — 3:44.40 (→ Silver Medal)

Women's 4x100 Medley Relay

- Jolanda de Rover, Petra van Staveren, Annemarie Verstappen, and Desi Reijers

- Heat — DSQ (→ did not advance)

== Synchronized swimming ==
Women's Solo

- Marijke Engelen
- Catrien Eijken
- Marjolein Philipsen

Women's Duet

- Marijke Engelen and Catrien Eijken

== Water polo ==
=== Men's team competition ===
- Preliminary round (group A)

- Defeated Canada (10-9)
- Lost to Yugoslavia (5-9)
- Defeated China (10-8)

- Final Round (Group D)

- Lost to United States (7-8)
- Lost to Spain (4-8)
- Lost to Yugoslavia (5-9)
- Lost to Australia (7-8)
- Lost to West Germany (2-15) → 6th place

- Team roster

- Johan Aantjes
- Stan van Belkum
- Wouly de Bie
- Ton Buunk
- Ed van Es
- Anton Heiden
- Nico Landeweerd
- Aad van Mil
- Ruud Misdorp
- Dick Nieuwenhuizen
- Eric Noordegraaf
- Roald van Noort
- Remco Pielstroom
