= Netherlands at the Olympics =

- Flag of the Netherlands
- IOC code: NED
- NOC: NOC*NSF
- Website: www.nocnsf.nl (in Dutch)
- Medals Ranked 15th: Gold 174 Silver 168 Bronze 182 Total 524

Summer appearances
- 1900; 1904; 1908; 1912; 1920; 1924; 1928; 1932; 1936; 1948; 1952; 1956; 1960; 1964; 1968; 1972; 1976; 1980; 1984; 1988; 1992; 1996; 2000; 2004; 2008; 2012; 2016; 2020; 2024; 2028

Winter appearances
- 1928; 1932; 1936; 1948; 1952; 1956; 1960; 1964; 1968; 1972; 1976; 1980; 1984; 1988; 1992; 1994; 1998; 2002; 2006; 2010; 2014; 2018; 2022; 2026

Other related appearances
- 1906 Intercalated Games

The Netherlands first sent athletes to the Olympic Games in 1900, and has participated in almost all Games since then, except for the 1904 Games in St. Louis, which were attended by only a handful of countries due to travel difficulties and limited international participation. Netherlands boycotted the main events of the 1956 Summer Olympics held in Melbourne, joining several other nations in protest of the Soviet Union's invasion of Hungary, due to the Hungarian Uprising. However, one Dutch rider did take part in the equestrian events, which were held earlier that year in Stockholm, Sweden, due to Australian quarantine laws.

The first individual gold medal at the Summer Games was earned by Maurice Peeters in cycling at the 1920 Summer Olympics, in the men's 1000 metres sprint event. The first gold medal at the Winter Games was earned by Sjoukje Dijkstra in ladies' figure skating at the 1964 Winter Olympics.

Prior to the 1992 Olympics, the country name was "Holland" with the country code of "HOL". From 1992 onward, they have utilized the "Netherlands" and "NED", as an abbreviation of the Dutch name Nederland.

Dutch athletes have won 357 medals at the Summer Olympic Games, with swimming and cycling as the top medal-producing sports. The nation has won another 167 medals at the Winter Olympic Games, of which 146 have come from speed skating.

In addition to its sporting achievements, Netherlands have won medals in one of the three discontinued Olympic non-sport competitions. The country won a total of six medals—2 gold, 1 silver, and 3 bronze—in the art competitions held during 1924, 1928 and 1932 Summer Olympics. These events were once part of the official Olympic program in the early 20th century, between 1912 and 1948.

== Hosted Games ==
Games	Host city	Dates	Nations	Participants	Events
1928 Summer Olympics	Amsterdam	28 July – 12 August	46	2,883	109

The Netherlands hosted the 1928 Summer Olympics in Amsterdam. The Netherlands submitted a bid to host the 1992 Summer Olympics in Amsterdam, but dropped out after the first selection round when the Dutch bid received only five out of 85 votes cast. The Netherlands had expressed interest in hosting the 2028 Summer Olympics in either Amsterdam or Rotterdam, as a centennial celebration of the 1928 Games. Eventually, no bid came from either city and the Olympics were awarded to Los Angeles.

Thialf in Heerenveen will host long track speed skating at the 2030 Winter Olympics which is being held in the French Alps.

== Overview of Olympic participation ==
=== Timeline of participation ===
Olympic Year/s	Teams		
1900–1952 W	Netherlands		
1952 S	Netherlands	Netherlands Antilles	
1956	Netherlands		
1960–1984	Netherlands	Netherlands Antilles	
1988–2008	Netherlands	Netherlands Antilles	Aruba
2012	Netherlands	as part of Netherlands / Independent Olympic Athletes	Aruba
2014–present	Netherlands		Aruba

Following the dissolution of the Netherlands Antilles in 2010—a former constituent country of the Kingdom of the Netherlands—the Netherlands Antilles Olympic Committee (NAOC) lost its Olympic recognition in July 2011. The NAOC had been established in 1931 and was officially recognized by the International Olympic Committee (IOC) from 1950 until its removal in 2011. The Netherlands Antilles competed in the Olympic Games from 1952 to 2008. In 1986, Aruba separated from the Netherlands Antilles to become a distinct constituent country within the Kingdom. From 1952 to 1984, Aruban athletes competed under the Netherlands Antilles, but since 1988, Aruba has participated independently at every Summer Olympics.

After the 2010 dissolution, the five islands of the former Netherlands Antilles underwent different constitutional changes: Bonaire, Sint Eustatius, and Saba became special municipalities of the Netherlands, while Curaçao and Sint Maarten became separate constituent countries within the Kingdom of the Netherlands. Due to the loss of the NAOC's recognition, athletes from the former Netherlands Antilles were given several options for the 2012 Summer Olympics in London. They could:

- compete as Independent Olympic Athletes under the IOC flag,
- represent the Netherlands, or
- represent Aruba, provided they met eligibility requirements.

Ultimately, three athletes chose to compete as independents under the Olympic flag. Others, such as Churandy Martina, opted to represent the Netherlands. All athletes retained Dutch nationality, allowing them to select their affiliation. Although some athletes expressed interest early on in representing either Aruba, which has a semi-independent status within the Kingdom of the Netherlands, or the Netherlands, those without an official national committee by 2012 were permitted to compete independently for that edition of the Games.

=== Medals by Summer Games ===
Host country

Games	Athletes	Gold	Silver	Bronze	Total	Rank
(French Third Republic) 1900 Paris	29	1	2	3	6	9
(United States) 1904 St. Louis	did not participate					
(United Kingdom) 1908 London	113	0	0	2	2	17
(Sweden) 1912 Stockholm	33	0	0	3	3	18
(Belgium) 1920 Antwerp	113	4	2	5	11	9
(French Third Republic) 1924 Paris	177	4	1	5	10	9
(Netherlands) 1928 Amsterdam	264	6	9	4	19	8
(United States) 1932 Los Angeles	45	2	5	0	7	13
(Nazi Germany) 1936 Berlin	165	6	4	7	17	9
(United Kingdom) 1948 London	149	5	2	9	16	11
(Finland) 1952 Helsinki	104	0	5	0	5	29
(Australia) 1956 Melbourne	1	0	0	0	0	–
(Italy) 1960 Rome	110	0	1	2	3	28
(Japan) 1964 Tokyo	125	2	4	4	10	15
1968 Mexico City	107	3	3	1	7	17
(West Germany) 1972 Munich	119	3	1	1	5	16
(Canada) 1976 Montreal	109	0	2	3	5	29
(Soviet Union) 1980 Moscow	90	0	1	2	3	30
(United States) 1984 Los Angeles	136	5	2	6	13	13
(South Korea) 1988 Seoul	147	2	2	5	9	22
(Spain) 1992 Barcelona	220	2	6	7	15	20
(United States) 1996 Atlanta	235	4	5	10	19	15
(Australia) 2000 Sydney	243	12	9	4	25	8
(Greece) 2004 Athens	210	4	9	9	22	18
(China) 2008 Beijing	243	7	5	4	16	11
(United Kingdom) 2012 London	188	6	6	8	20	12
(Brazil) 2016 Rio de Janeiro	241	8	7	4	19	11
(Japan) 2020 Tokyo	278	10	12	14	36	7
(France) 2024 Paris	273	15	7	12	34	6
(United States) 2028 Los Angeles	future event					
(Australia) 2032 Brisbane	future event					
Total (28/30)	4,267	111	112	134	357	14

Notes

- ^{ART} Art competitions (1912–1948) are not included in the medal table above, as they were non-sports events formerly part of the Olympic Games. (Note: In 1952, art competition medals, as well as the gold medal awards for feats in alpinism and aeronautics, were removed from the official national medal counts. Only since 2021 have they been officially listed again by the IOC in the medal tables and respective National Olympic Committee (NOC) profiles on its website.) Netherlands won a total of six art competition medals (2 gold, 1 silver, and 3 bronze), across the 1924, 1928, and 1932 Summer Olympics.
- ^{MIX} At the 1900 Summer Olympics, an "unknown French boy" is recorded to have participated as the coxswain for the gold-winning mixed team (which was the Dutch team prior to his joining) in the men's coxed pair rowing competition.
  Believed to possibly be the youngest Olympic medalist in history, the identity of the boy remains to this day unknown. Despite being referred to as the "unknown French boy" in Olympic archives, his nationality is not known with certainty. The gold medal is attributed to the Netherlands. (Note: Until 2024, the IOC classified all teams composed of athletes from different countries in the early Modern Olympic Games as mixed teams (IOC code ZZX), regardless of whether they represented an established club. Since 2024, teams representing a club have been attributed to the club's country, even if they included foreign athletes. Only ad hoc teams formed solely for the Olympic Games are now classified as mixed teams.)

=== Medals by Winter Games ===
Games	Athletes	Gold	Silver	Bronze	Total	Rank
(Switzerland) 1928 St. Moritz	7	0	0	0	0	–
(United States) 1932 Lake Placid	did not participate					
(Nazi Germany) 1936 Garmisch-Partenkirchen	8	0	0	0	0	–
(Switzerland) 1948 St. Moritz	4	0	0	0	0	–
(Norway) 1952 Oslo	11	0	3	0	3	9
(Italy) 1956 Cortina d'Ampezzo	8	0	0	0	0	–
(United States) 1960 Squaw Valley	7	0	1	1	2	11
(Austria) 1964 Innsbruck	6	1	1	0	2	9
(France) 1968 Grenoble	9	3	3	3	9	6
(Japan) 1972 Sapporo	11	4	3	2	9	4
(Austria) 1976 Innsbruck	7	1	2	3	6	9
(United States) 1980 Lake Placid	29	1	2	1	4	9
(Socialist Federal Republic of Yugoslavia) 1984 Sarajevo	13	0	0	0	0	–
(Canada) 1988 Calgary	11	3	2	2	7	7
(France) 1992 Albertville	19	1	1	2	4	12
(Norway) 1994 Lillehammer	21	0	1	3	4	18
(Japan) 1998 Nagano	22	5	4	2	11	6
(United States) 2002 Salt Lake City	27	3	5	0	8	9
(Italy) 2006 Turin	33	3	2	4	9	10
(Canada) 2010 Vancouver	34	4	1	3	8	10
(Russia) 2014 Sochi	41	8	7	9	24	5
(South Korea) 2018 Pyeongchang	33	8	6	6	20	5
(China) 2022 Beijing	41	8	5	4	17	6
(Italy) 2026 Milano Cortina	38	10	7	3	20	3
(France) 2030 French Alps	future event					
(United States) 2034 Utah	future event					
Total (23/25)	440	63	56	48	167	9

=== Medals by summer sport ===
Leading in that sport

Sport	Gold	Silver	Bronze	Total
Cycling	26	25	17	68
Swimming	19	20	21	60
Rowing	12	17	15	44
Equestrian	10	13	5	28
Sailing	10	9	11	30
Athletics	10	8	12	30
Field hockey	8	6	6	20
Judo	4	2	18	24
Marathon swimming	4	1	0	5
Gymnastics	3	0	0	3
Boxing	1	2	5	8
Archery	1	1	1	3
Volleyball	1	1	0	2
Water polo	1	0	3	4
3x3 basketball	1	0	0	1
Canoeing	0	3	5	8
Shooting	0	1	1	2
Tennis	0	1	1	2
Badminton	0	1	0	1
Tug of war	0	1	0	1
Fencing	0	0	5	5
Football	0	0	3	3
Weightlifting	0	0	3	3
Artistic swimming	0	0	1	1
Beach volleyball	0	0	1	1
Totals (25 entries)	111	112	134	357

=== Medals by winter sport ===
Sport	Gold	Silver	Bronze	Total
Speed skating	53	50	43	146
Short track speed skating	8	4	4	16
Figure skating	1	2	0	3
Snowboarding	1	0	0	1
Skeleton	0	0	1	1
Totals (5 entries)	63	56	48	167

== List of medalists ==
=== Summer Olympics ===
Medal	Name	Games	Sport	Event
Gold	Minerva Amsterdam: François Brandt Hermanus Brockmann Roelof Klein Unknown boy (FRA)	(France) 1900 Paris	Rowing	Men's Coxed pair
Silver	Henri Smulders; Chris Hooijkaas; Arie van der Velden	(France) 1900 Paris	Sailing	3 to 10 ton (Race 1)
Silver	Coenraad Hiebendaal; Geert Lotsij; Paul Lotsij; Johannes Terwogt; Hermanus Brockmann	(France) 1900 Paris	Rowing	Men's coxed four
Bronze	François Brandt; Johannes van Dijk; Roelof Klein; Ruurd Leegstra; Walter Middelberg; Hendrik Offerhaus; Walter Thijssen; Henricus Tromp; Hermanus Brockmann	(France) 1900 Paris	Rowing	Men's eight
Bronze	Johannes Drost	(France) 1900 Paris	Swimming	Men's 200m backstroke
Bronze	Solko van den Bergh; Antonius Bouwens; Dirk Boest Gips; Henrik Sillem; Anthony Sweijs	(France) 1900 Paris	Shooting	Men's 50m free pistol, team
Bronze	Football team: Reinier Beeuwkes Frans de Bruyn Kops Karel Heijting Jan Kok Bok de Korver Emil Mundt Louis Otten Jops Reeman Edu Snethlage Ed Sol Jan Thomée Caius Welcker	(United Kingdom) 1908 London	Football	Men's team competition
Bronze	Hermannus Höfte; Albertus Wielsma; Johan Burk; Bernardus Croon	(United Kingdom) 1908 London	Rowing	Men's coxless four
Bronze	Willem van Blijenburgh; Adrianus de Jong; Jetze Doorman; Hendrik de Iongh; George van Rossem; Dirk Scalongne	(Sweden) 1912 Stockholm	Fencing	Men's team sabre
Bronze	Willem van Blijenburgh; Adrianus de Jong; Jetze Doorman; Leonardus Nardus; George van Rossem	(Sweden) 1912 Stockholm	Fencing	Men's team épée
Bronze	Football team: Piet Bouman Joop Boutmy Nico Bouvy Huug de Groot Bok de Korver Nico de Wolf Constant Feith Ge Fortgens Just Göbel Dirk Lotsy Caesar ten Cate Jan van Breda Kolff Jan van der Sluis Jan Vos David Wijnveldt	(Sweden) 1912 Stockholm	Football	Men's team competition
Gold	Piet de Brouwer; Joep Packbiers; Janus Theeuwes; Driekske van Brussel; Jo van Gastel; Tiest van Gestel; Janus van Merrienboer; Theo Willems	(Belgium) 1920 Antwerp	Archery	Team moving bird, 28m
Gold	Maurice Peeters	(Belgium) 1920 Antwerp	Cycling (Track)	Men's sprint
Gold	Cornelis Hin; Johan Hin; Frans Hin	(Belgium) 1920 Antwerp	Sailing	12' Dinghy
Gold	Johan Carp; Bernard Carp; Petrus Wernink	(Belgium) 1920 Antwerp	Sailing	6.5 Metre
Silver	Arnoud van der Biesen; Petrus Beukers	(Belgium) 1920 Antwerp	Sailing	12' Dinghy
Silver	Wilhelmus Bekkers; Johannes Hengeveld; Sytse Jansma; Henk Janssen; Antonius van Loon; Willem van Loon; Marinus van Rekum; Willem van Rekum	(Belgium) 1920 Antwerp	Tug of war	Men's team
Bronze	Piet Ikelaar	(Belgium) 1920 Antwerp	Cycling (Track)	Men's 50km
Bronze	Piet Ikelaar; Frans de Vreng	(Belgium) 1920 Antwerp	Cycling (Track)	Men's tandem
Bronze	Adrianus de Jong	(Belgium) 1920 Antwerp	Fencing	Men's sabre
Bronze	Willem van Blijenburgh; Adrianus de Jong; Jetze Doorman; Louis Delaunoy; Salomon Zeldenrust; Jan van der Wiel; Henri Wijnoldy-Daniëls	(Belgium) 1920 Antwerp	Fencing	Men's team sabre
Bronze	Football team: Arie Bieshaar Leo Bosschart Evert Jan Bulder Jaap Bulder Harry Dénis Jan van Dort Ber Groosjohan Felix von Heijden Frits Kuipers Dick MacNeill Jan de Natris Oscar van Rappard Henk Steeman Ben Verweij	(Belgium) 1920 Antwerp	Football	Men's team competition
Gold	Ko Willems	(France) 1924 Paris	Cycling (Track)	Men's 50km
Gold	Adolph van der Voort van Zijp	(France) 1924 Paris	Equestrian	Individual eventing
Gold	Adolph van der Voort van Zijp; Charles Pahud de Mortanges; Gerard de Kruijff; Antonius Colenbrander	(France) 1924 Paris	Equestrian (eventing)	Team eventing
Gold	Teun Beijnen; Willy Rösingh	(France) 1924 Paris	Rowing	Men's coxless pair
Silver	Jacob Meijer	(France) 1924 Paris	Cycling (Track)	Men's sprint
Bronze	Jaap Boot; Jan de Vries; Harry Broos; Rinus van den Berge	(France) 1924 Paris	Athletics	Men's 4 × 100 m relay
Bronze	Gerard Bosch van Drakestein; Maurice Peeters	(France) 1924 Paris	Cycling (Track)	Men's tandem
Bronze	Hendrik Scherpenhuijzen; Adrianus de Jong; Jetze Doorman; Maarten van Dulm; Henri Wijnoldy-Daniëls; Jan van der Wiel	(France) 1924 Paris	Fencing	Men's team sabre
Bronze	Kea Bouman; Henk Timmer	(France) 1924 Paris	Tennis	Mixed doubles
Bronze	Johan Carp; Anthonij Guépin; Jan Vreede	(France) 1924 Paris	Sailing	6 metre class
Gold	Bep van Klaveren	(Netherlands) 1928 Amsterdam	Boxing	Featherweight
Gold	Bernhard Leene; Daan van Dijk	(Netherlands) 1928 Amsterdam	Cycling (Track)	Men's tandem
Gold	Charles Pahud de Mortanges	(Netherlands) 1928 Amsterdam	Equestrian (eventing)	Eventing (individual)
Gold	Charles Pahud de Mortanges; Gerard de Kruijff; Adolph van der Voort van Zijp	(Netherlands) 1928 Amsterdam	Equestrian (eventing)	Eventing (team)
Gold	Women's all-round team: Estella Agsteribbe Jacomina van den Berg Alida van den Bos Petronella Burgerhof Elka de Levie Helena Nordheim Ans Polak Petronella van Randwijk Hendrika van Rumt Jud Simons Jacoba Stelma Anna van der Vegt	(Netherlands) 1928 Amsterdam	Gymnastics	Women's team
Gold	Marie Braun	(Netherlands) 1928 Amsterdam	Swimming	Women's 100m backstroke
Silver	Lien Gisolf	(Netherlands) 1928 Amsterdam	Athletics	Women's high jump
Silver	Gerard Bosch van Drakestein	(Netherlands) 1928 Amsterdam	Cycling (Track)	Men's track time trial
Silver	Antoine Mazairac	(Netherlands) 1928 Amsterdam	Cycling (Track)	Men's sprint
Silver	Johannes Maas; Jan Pijnenburg; Janus Braspennincx; Piet van der Horst	(Netherlands) 1928 Amsterdam	Cycling (Track)	Men's team pursuit
Silver	Gerard de Kruijff	(Netherlands) 1928 Amsterdam	Equestrian (eventing)	Eventing (individual)
Silver	Field hockey team: Jan Ankerman Jan Brand Rein de Waal Emile Duson Gerrit Jannink August Kop Ab Tresling Paul van de Rovaart Robert van der Veen Haas Visser 't Hooft	(Netherlands) 1928 Amsterdam	Field hockey	Men's team competition
Silver	Johannes van Hoolwerff; Lambertus Doedes; Hendrik Kersken; Gerard de Vries Lentsch; Cornelis van Staveren; Maarten de Wit	(Netherlands) 1928 Amsterdam	Sailing	8 metre class
Silver	Marie Braun	(Netherlands) 1928 Amsterdam	Swimming	Women's 400m freestyle
Silver	Mietje Baron	(Netherlands) 1928 Amsterdam	Swimming	Women's 200m breaststroke
Bronze	Karel Miljon	(Netherlands) 1928 Amsterdam	Boxing	Light heavyweight
Bronze	Jan van Reede; Pierre Versteegh; Gerard le Heux	(Netherlands) 1928 Amsterdam	Equestrian	Team dressage
Bronze	Guus Scheffer	(Netherlands) 1928 Amsterdam	Weightlifting	Middleweight (-75kg)
Bronze	Jan Verheijen	(Netherlands) 1928 Amsterdam	Weightlifting	Light heavyweight (-82.5kg)
Gold	Jacques van Egmond	(Netherlands) 1928 Amsterdam	Cycling (Track)	Men's sprint
Gold	Charles Pahud de Mortanges	(United States) 1932 Los Angeles	Equestrian (eventing)	Eventing (individual)
Silver	Jacques van Egmond	(United States) 1932 Los Angeles	Cycling (Track)	Men's 1000m time trial
Silver	Charles Pahud de Mortanges; Aernout van Lennep; Karel Schummelketel	(United States) 1932 Los Angeles	Equestrian (eventing)	Eventing (team)
Silver	Willy den Ouden	(United States) 1932 Los Angeles	Swimming	Women's 100m freestyle
Silver	Corrie Laddé; Willy den Ouden; Puck Oversloot; Maria Vierdag	(United States) 1932 Los Angeles	Swimming	Women's 4 × 100 m freestyle relay
Silver	Adriaan Maas	(United States) 1932 Los Angeles	Sailing	Snowbird
Gold	Arie van Vliet	(Germany) 1936 Berlin	Cycling (Track)	Men's 1.000m Time Trial
Gold	Rie Mastenbroek	(Germany) 1936 Berlin	Swimming	Women's 100m freestyle
Gold	Rie Mastenbroek	(Germany) 1936 Berlin	Swimming	Women's 400m freestyle
Gold	Nida Senff	(Germany) 1936 Berlin	Swimming	Women's 100m backstroke
Gold	Willy den Ouden; Rie Mastenbroek; Jopie Selbach; Tini Wagner	(Germany) 1936 Berlin	Swimming	Women's 4 × 100 m freestyle relay
Gold	Daan Kagchelland	(Germany) 1936 Berlin	Sailing	Men's Monotype Class
Silver	Arie van Vliet	(Germany) 1936 Berlin	Cycling (Track)	Men's 1.000m Sprint (Scratch)
Silver	Bernhard Leene; Hendrik Ooms	(Germany) 1936 Berlin	Cycling (Track)	Men's 2.000m Tandem
Silver	Jan de Bruine; Johan Greter; Henri van Schaik	(Germany) 1936 Berlin	Equestrian	Jumping Team
Silver	Rie Mastenbroek	(Germany) 1936 Berlin	Swimming	Women's 100m backstroke
Bronze	Tinus Osendarp	(Germany) 1936 Berlin	Athletics	Men's 100 metres
Bronze	Tinus Osendarp	(Germany) 1936 Berlin	Athletics	Men's 200 metres
Bronze	Jaap Kraaier	(Germany) 1936 Berlin	Canoeing	Men's K1 1.000m Kayak Singles
Bronze	Nico Tates; Wim van der Kroft	(Germany) 1936 Berlin	Canoeing	Men's K2 1.000m Kayak Pairs
Bronze	Kees Wijdekop; Piet Wijdekop	(Germany) 1936 Berlin	Canoeing	Men's F2 10.000m Folding Kayak Pairs
Bronze	Field hockey team: Henk de Looper Jan de Looper Agathon de Roos Rein de Waal Pieter Gunning Carl Heijbroek Henri Schnitger René Sparenberg Ernst van den Berg Rudolf van der Haar Antoine van Lierop Max Westerkamp	(Germany) 1936 Berlin	Field hockey	Men's team competition
Bronze	Willem de Vries Lentsch; Bob Maas	(Germany) 1936 Berlin	Sailing	Men's Star
Gold	Fanny Blankers-Koen	(United Kingdom) 1948 London	Athletics	Women's 100m
Gold	Fanny Blankers-Koen	(United Kingdom) 1948 London	Athletics	Women's 200m
Gold	Fanny Blankers-Koen	(United Kingdom) 1948 London	Athletics	Women's 80m hurdles
Gold	Fanny Blankers-Koen; Xenia Stad-de Jong; Gerda van der Kade-Koudijs; Nettie Witziers-Timmer	(United Kingdom) 1948 London	Athletics	Women's 4 × 100 m relay
Gold	Nel van Vliet	(United Kingdom) 1948 London	Swimming	Women's 200m breaststroke
Silver	Gerrit Voorting	(United Kingdom) 1948 London	Cycling (Road)	Men's individual road race
Silver	Lida van der Anker-Doedens	(United Kingdom) 1948 London	Canoeing	Women's K-1 500m kayak singles
Bronze	Wim Slijkhuis	(United Kingdom) 1948 London	Athletics	Men's 1500m
Bronze	Wim Slijkhuis	(United Kingdom) 1948 London	Athletics	Men's 5000m
Bronze	Marie-Louise Linssen-Vaessen	(United Kingdom) 1948 London	Swimming	Women's 100m freestyle
Bronze	Irma Heijting-Schuhmacher; Marie-Louise Linssen-Vaessen; Hannie Termeulen; Margot Marsman	(United Kingdom) 1948 London	Swimming	Women's 4 × 100 m freestyle relay
Bronze	Koos de Jong	(United Kingdom) 1948 London	Sailing	Men's Firefly Class
Bronze	Bob Maas; Edward Stutterheim	(United Kingdom) 1948 London	Sailing	Men's Star
Bronze	Field hockey team: André Boerstra Henk Bouwman Piet Bromberg Harry Derckx Han Drijver Dick Esser Wim van Heel Roepie Kruize Jenne Langhout Dick Loggere Ton Richter Eddy Tiel	(United Kingdom) 1948 London	Field hockey	Men's team competition
Bronze	Water polo team: Cor Braasem Hennie Keetelaar Nijs Korevaar Joop Rohner Frits Ruimschotel Piet Salomons Frits Smol Hans Stam Ruud van Feggelen	(United Kingdom) 1948 London	Water polo	Men's team competition
Bronze	Abraham Charité	(United Kingdom) 1948 London	Weightlifting	Men's + 82.5 kg
Silver	Bertha Brouwer	(Finland) 1952 Helsinki	Athletics	Women's 200 metres
Silver	Field hockey team: Jules Ancion André Boerstra Harry Derckx Han Drijver Dick Esser Roepie Kruize Dick Loggere Lau Mulder Eddy Tiel Wim van Heel Henk Wery	(Finland) 1952 Helsinki	Field hockey	Men's Team Competition
Silver	Hannie Termeulen	(Finland) 1952 Helsinki	Swimming	Women's 100m Freestyle
Silver	Geertje Wielema	(Finland) 1952 Helsinki	Swimming	Women's 100m Backstroke
Silver	Irma Heijting-Schuhmacher; Hannie Termeulen; Marie-Louise Linssen-Vaessen; Koosje van Voorn	(Finland) 1952 Helsinki	Swimming	Women's 4 × 100 m Freestyle Relay
Silver	Marianne Heemskerk	(Italy) 1960 Rome	Swimming	Women's 100m Butterfly
Bronze	Wieger Mensonides	(Italy) 1960 Rome	Swimming	Men's 200m Breaststroke
Bronze	Tineke Lagerberg	(Italy) 1960 Rome	Swimming	Women's 400m Freestyle
Gold	Anton Geesink	(Japan) 1964 Tokyo	Judo	Men's Open Class
Gold	Bart Zoet; Jan Pieterse; Evert Dolman; Gerben Karstens	(Japan) 1964 Tokyo	Cycling (Road)	Men's Team Road Race
Silver	Anton Geurts; Paul Hoekstra	(Japan) 1964 Tokyo	Canoeing	Men's K2 1,000m Kayak Pairs
Silver	Steven Blaisse; Ernst Veenemans	(Japan) 1964 Tokyo	Rowing	Men's Coxless Pairs
Silver	Ada Kok	(Japan) 1964 Tokyo	Swimming	Women's 100m Butterfly
Silver	Corrie Winkel; Ada Kok; Klenie Bimolt; Erica Terpstra	(Japan) 1964 Tokyo	Swimming	Women's 4 × 100 m Medley Relay
Bronze	Cor Schuuring; Henk Cornelisse; Gerard Koel; Jaap Oudkerk	(Japan) 1964 Tokyo	Cycling (Track)	Men's 4,000m Team Pursuit
Bronze	Jan Justus Bos; Erik Hartsuiker; Herman Rouwé	(Japan) 1964 Tokyo	Rowing	Men's Coxed Pairs
Bronze	Jan van de Graaff; Robert van de Graaf; Marius Klumperbeek; Lex Mullink; Freek van de Graaff	(Japan) 1964 Tokyo	Rowing	Men's Coxed Fours
Bronze	Winnie van Weerdenburg; Pauline van der Wildt; Toos Beumer; Erica Terpstra	(Japan) 1964 Tokyo	Swimming	Swimming, Women's 4 × 100 m Freestyle Relay
Gold	Ada Kok	1968 Mexico City	Swimming	Women's 200 m butterfly
Gold	Jan Wienese	1968 Mexico City	Rowing	Men's single sculls
Gold	Joop Zoetemelk; Jan Krekels; Fedor den Hertog; René Pijnen	1968 Mexico City	Cycling (Road)	Men's team 100k time trial
Silver	Jan Jansen; Leijn Loevesteijn	1968 Mexico City	Cycling (Track)	Men's 2000m Tandem
Silver	Harry Droog; Leendert van Dis	1968 Mexico City	Rowing	Men's Double Sculls
Silver	Roderick Rijnders; Herman Suselbeek; Hadriaan van Nes	1968 Mexico City	Rowing	Men's Coxed Pairs
Bronze	Maria Gommers	1968 Mexico City	Athletics	Women's 800m
Gold	Hennie Kuiper	(West Germany) 1972 Munich	Cycling (Road)	Men's Individual Road Race
Gold	Wim Ruska	(West Germany) 1972 Munich	Judo	Men's Heavyweight
Gold	Wim Ruska	(West Germany) 1972 Munich	Judo	Men's Open Category
Silver	Mieke Jaapies	(West Germany) 1972 Munich	Canoeing	Women's Flatwater K-1 500m
Bronze	Roel Luynenburg; Ruud Stokvis	(West Germany) 1972 Munich	Rowing	Men's Coxless Pairs
Silver	Herman Ponsteen	(Canada) 1976 Montreal	Cycling (Track)	Men's 4000m Individual Pursuit
Silver	Eric Swinkels	(Canada) 1976 Montreal	Shooting	Men's Skeet Shooting
Bronze	Enith Brigitha	(Canada) 1976 Montreal	Swimming	Women's 100m Freestyle
Bronze	Enith Brigitha	(Canada) 1976 Montreal	Swimming	Women's 200m Freestyle
Bronze	Water polo team: Alex Boegschoten Ton Buunk Piet de Zwarte Andy Hoepelman Evert Kroon Nico Landeweerd Hans Smits Gijze Stroboer Rik Toonen Hans van Zeeland Jan Evert Veer	(Canada) 1976 Montreal	Water polo	Men's competition
Silver	Gerard Nijboer	(Soviet Union) 1980 Moscow	Athletics	Men's Marathon
Bronze	Henk Numan	(Soviet Union) 1980 Moscow	Judo	Men's Half-Heavyweight (95 kg)
Bronze	Conny van Bentum; Reggie de Jong; Annelies Maas; Wilma van Velsen	(Soviet Union) 1980 Moscow	Swimming	Women's 4 × 100 m Freestyle Relay
Gold	Ria Stalman	(United States) 1984 Los Angeles	Athletics	Women's discus throw
Gold	Field hockey team: Carina Benninga Fieke Boekhorst Marjolein Eijsvogel Det de Beus Irene Hendriks Elsemiek Hillen Sandra Le Poole Anneloes Nieuwenhuizen Martine Ohr Alette Pos Lisette Sevens Marieke van Doorn Aletta van Manen Sophie von Weiler Laurien Willemse Margriet Zegers	(United States) 1984 Los Angeles	Field hockey	Women's competition
Gold	Stephan van den Berg	(United States) 1984 Los Angeles	Sailing	Men's Windglider
Gold	Jolanda de Rover	(United States) 1984 Los Angeles	Swimming	Women's 200m Backstroke
Gold	Petra van Staveren	(United States) 1984 Los Angeles	Swimming	Women's 100m Breaststroke
Silver	Greet Hellemans; Nicolette Hellemans	(United States) 1984 Los Angeles	Rowing	Women's Double Sculls
Silver	Conny van Bentum; Desi Reijers; Annemarie Verstappen; Elles Voskes	(United States) 1984 Los Angeles	Swimming	Women's 4 × 100 m Freestyle Relay
Bronze	Arnold Vanderlyde	(United States) 1984 Los Angeles	Boxing	Men's Heavyweight
Bronze	Annemiek Derckx	(United States) 1984 Los Angeles	Canoeing	Women's K1 500m kayak singles
Bronze	Marieke van Drogenbroek; Lynda Cornet; Harriet van Ettekoven; Greet Hellemans; Nicolette Hellemans; Martha Laurijsen; Catharina Neelissen; Anne Quist; Wiljon Vaandrager	(United States) 1984 Los Angeles	Rowing	Women's Eights
Bronze	Annemarie Verstappen	(United States) 1984 Los Angeles	Swimming	Women's 100m Freestyle
Bronze	Annemarie Verstappen	(United States) 1984 Los Angeles	Swimming	Women's 200m Freestyle
Bronze	Jolanda de Rover	(United States) 1984 Los Angeles	Swimming	Women's 100m Backstroke
Gold	Monique Knol	(South Korea) 1988 Seoul	Cycling (Road)	Women's Individual Road Race
Gold	Nico Rienks; Ronald Florijn	(South Korea) 1988 Seoul	Rowing	Men's Double Sculls
Silver	Leo Peelen	(South Korea) 1988 Seoul	Cycling (Track)	Men's Points Race
Silver	Conny van Bentum; Karin Brienesse; Marianne Muis; Mildred Muis	(South Korea) 1988 Seoul	Swimming	Women's 4 × 100 m Freestyle Relay
Bronze	Arnold Vanderlyde	(South Korea) 1988 Seoul	Boxing	Men's Heavyweight (91 kg)
Bronze	Annemarie Cox; Annemiek Derckx	(South Korea) 1988 Seoul	Canoeing	Women's K2 500m Kayak Pairs
Bronze	Field hockey team: Marc Benninga Cees Jan Diepeveen Patrick Faber René Klaassen Hendrik Jan Kooijman Taco van den Honert Hidde Kruize Frank Leistra Erik Parlevliet Gert Jan Schlatmann Tim Steens Floris Jan Bovelander Jacques Brinkman Marc Delissen Maurits Crucq Ronald Jansen	(South Korea) 1988 Seoul	Field hockey	Men's competition
Bronze	Field hockey team: Willemien Aardenburg Helen van der Ben Yvonne Buter Annemieke Fokke Noor Holsboer Lisanne Lejeune Ingrid Wolff Carina Benninga Marjolein Eijsvogel Det de Beus Anneloes Nieuwenhuizen Martine Ohr Marieke van Doorn Aletta van Manen Sophie von Weiler Laurien Willemse	(South Korea) 1988 Seoul	Field hockey	Women's competition
Bronze	Ben Spijkers	(South Korea) 1988 Seoul	Judo	Men's Middleweight (86 kg)
Gold	Ellen van Langen	(Spain) 1992 Barcelona	Athletics	Women's 800 m
Gold	Jos Lansink; Piet Raymakers; Jan Tops	(Spain) 1992 Barcelona	Equestrian	Jumping team
Silver	Orhan Delibaş	(Spain) 1992 Barcelona	Boxing	Men's Light Middleweight
Silver	Erik Dekker	(Spain) 1992 Barcelona	Cycling (Road)	Men's Individual Road Race
Silver	Léon van Bon	(Spain) 1992 Barcelona	Cycling (Track)	Men's Points Race
Silver	Piet Raymakers	(Spain) 1992 Barcelona	Equestrian	Jumping individual
Silver	Tineke Bartels; Ellen Bontje; Anky van Grunsven; Annemarie Sanders	(Spain) 1992 Barcelona	Equestrian	Dressage team
Silver	Volleyball team: Edwin Benne Peter Blangé Ron Boudrie Henk-Jan Held Martin van der Horst Marko Klok Olof van der Meulen Jan Posthuma Avital Selinger Martin Teffer Ronald Zoodsma Ron Zwerver	(Spain) 1992 Barcelona	Volleyball	Men's competition
Bronze	Arnold Vanderlyde	(Spain) 1992 Barcelona	Boxing	Men's Heavyweight (91 kg)
Bronze	Monique Knol	(Spain) 1992 Barcelona	Cycling (Road)	Women's Individual Road Race
Bronze	Ingrid Haringa	(Spain) 1992 Barcelona	Cycling (Track)	Women's Sprint
Bronze	Theo Meijer	(Spain) 1992 Barcelona	Judo	Men's Half Heavyweight (95 kg)
Bronze	Irene de Kok	(Spain) 1992 Barcelona	Judo	Women's Half Heavyweight (72 kg)
Bronze	Nico Rienks Henk-Jan Zwolle	(Spain) 1992 Barcelona	Rowing	Men's Double Sculls
Bronze	Dorien de Vries	(Spain) 1992 Barcelona	Sailing	Women's Windglider
Gold	Bart Brentjens	(United States) 1996 Atlanta	Cycling (Mountain biking)	Men's race
Gold	Volleyball team: Peter Blangé Bas van de Goor Mike van de Goor Rob Grabert Henk-Jan Held Guido Görtzen Misha Latuhihin Olof van der Meulen Jan Posthuma Brecht Rodenburg Richard Schuil Ron Zwerver	(United States) 1996 Atlanta	Volleyball	Men's competition
Gold	Michiel Bartman; Jeroen Duyster; Ronald Florijn; Koos Maasdijk; Nico Rienks; Diederik Simon; Niels van Steenis; Niels van der Zwan; Henk-Jan Zwolle	(United States) 1996 Atlanta	Rowing	Men's Eights
Gold	Field hockey team: Jacques Brinkman Floris Jan Bovelander Maurits Crucq Marc Delissen Jeroen Delmee Taco van den Honert Erik Jazet Ronald Jansen Leo Klein Gebbink Bram Lomans Teun de Nooijer Wouter van Pelt Stephan Veen Guus Vogels Tycho van Meer Remco van Wijk	(United States) 1996 Atlanta	Field hockey	Men's competition
Silver	Ingrid Haringa	(United States) 1996 Atlanta	Cycling (Track)	Women's points race
Silver	Margriet Matthijsse	(United States) 1996 Atlanta	Sailing	Women's Europe Competition
Silver	Anky van Grunsven	(United States) 1996 Atlanta	Equestrian	Dressage individual
Silver	Tineke Bartels; Anky van Grunsven; Gonnelien Rothenberger; Sven Rothenberger	(United States) 1996 Atlanta	Equestrian	Dressage team
Silver	Pepijn Aardewijn; Maarten van der Linden	(United States) 1996 Atlanta	Rowing	Men's lightweight double scull
Bronze	Ingrid Haringa	(United States) 1996 Atlanta	Cycling (Track)	Women's sprint
Bronze	Sven Rothenberger	(United States) 1996 Atlanta	Equestrian	Dressage individual
Bronze	Field hockey team: Suzanne Plesman Dillianne van den Boogaard Florentine Steenberghe Willemijn Duyster Mijntje Donners Fleur van de Kieft Nicole Koolen Jeannette Lewin Wietske de Ruiter Ellen Kuipers Margje Teeuwen Carole Thate Jacqueline Toxopeus Stella de Heij Noor Holsboer Suzan van der Wielen	(United States) 1996 Atlanta	Field hockey	Women's competition
Bronze	Mark Huizinga	(United States) 1996 Atlanta	Judo	Men's Middleweight (86 kg)
Bronze	Jenny Gal	(United States) 1996 Atlanta	Judo	Women's Half Middleweight (61 kg)
Bronze	Claudia Zwiers	(United States) 1996 Atlanta	Judo	Women's Middleweight (66 kg)
Bronze	Irene Eijs; Eeke van Nes	(United States) 1996 Atlanta	Rowing	Women's Double Sculls
Bronze	Roy Heiner	(United States) 1996 Atlanta	Sailing	Men's Finn Competition
Bronze	Kirsten Vlieghuis	(United States) 1996 Atlanta	Swimming	Swimming, Women's 400 m Freestyle
Bronze	Kirsten Vlieghuis	(United States) 1996 Atlanta	Swimming	Women's 800 m Freestyle
Gold	Leontien van Moorsel	(Australia) 2000 Sydney	Cycling (Road)	Women's road race
Gold	Leontien van Moorsel	(Australia) 2000 Sydney	Cycling (Track)	Women's Individual Pursuit
Gold	Leontien van Moorsel	(Australia) 2000 Sydney	Cycling (Road)	Women's Individual Road Time Trial
Gold	Jeroen Dubbeldam	(Australia) 2000 Sydney	Equestrian	Jumping individual
Gold	Anky van Grunsven	(Australia) 2000 Sydney	Equestrian	Dressage individual
Gold	Field hockey team: Jacques Brinkman Jeroen Delmee Jaap-Derk Buma Marten Eikelboom Piet-Hein Geeris Erik Jazet Ronald Jansen Bram Lomans Teun de Nooijer Wouter van Pelt Stephan Veen Guus Vogels Peter Windt Diederik van Weel Sander van der Weide Remco van Wijk	(Australia) 2000 Sydney	Field hockey	Men's competition
Gold	Mark Huizinga	(Australia) 2000 Sydney	Judo	Men's middleweight (90 kg)
Gold	Pieter van den Hoogenband	(Australia) 2000 Sydney	Swimming	Men's 100 m freestyle
Gold	Pieter van den Hoogenband	(Australia) 2000 Sydney	Swimming	Men's 200 m freestyle
Gold	Inge de Bruijn	(Australia) 2000 Sydney	Swimming	Women's 50 m freestyle
Gold	Inge de Bruijn	(Australia) 2000 Sydney	Swimming	Women's 100 m freestyle
Gold	Inge de Bruijn	(Australia) 2000 Sydney	Swimming	Women's 100 m butterfly
Silver	Leontien van Moorsel	(Australia) 2000 Sydney	Cycling (Track)	Women's points race
Silver	Albert Voorn	(Australia) 2000 Sydney	Equestrian	Jumping individual
Silver	Arjen Teeuwissen; Coby van Baalen; Ellen Bontje; Anky van Grunsven	(Australia) 2000 Sydney	Equestrian	Dressage team
Silver	Michiel Bartman; Dirk Lippits; Diederik Simon; Jochem Verberne	(Australia) 2000 Sydney	Rowing	Men's Quadruple Sculls
Silver	Pieta van Dishoeck; Eeke van Nes	(Australia) 2000 Sydney	Rowing	Women's Double Sculls
Silver	Tessa Appeldoorn; Carin ter Beek; Pieta van Dishoeck; Elien Meijer; Eeke van Nes; Nelleke Penninx; Martijntje Quik; Anneke Venema; Marieke Westerhof	(Australia) 2000 Sydney	Rowing	Women's Eights
Silver	Margriet Matthijsse	(Australia) 2000 Sydney	Sailing	Women's Europe
Silver	Inge de Bruijn; Manon van Rooijen; Wilma van Hofwegen; Thamar Henneken; Chantal Groot	(Australia) 2000 Sydney	Swimming	Women's 4 × 100 m Freestyle Relay
Silver	Kristie Boogert; Miriam Oremans	(Australia) 2000 Sydney	Tennis	Women's doubles
Bronze	Wietse van Alten	(Australia) 2000 Sydney	Archery	Men's Individual Competition
Bronze	Field hockey team: Minke Booij Dillianne van den Boogaard Ageeth Boomgaardt Julie Deiters Mijntje Donners Fleur van de Kieft Fatima Moreira de Melo Clarinda Sinnige Hanneke Smabers Minke Smabers Margje Teeuwen Carole Thate Daphne Touw Macha van der Vaart Myrna Veenstra Suzan van der Wielen	(Australia) 2000 Sydney	Field hockey	Women's competition
Bronze	Pieter van den Hoogenband	(Australia) 2000 Sydney	Swimming	Men's 50m Freestyle
Bronze	Pieter van den Hoogenband; Johan Kenkhuis; Marcel Wouda; Martijn Zuijdweg; Mark van der Zijden	(Australia) 2000 Sydney	Swimming	Men's 4 × 200 m Freestyle Relay
Gold	Leontien van Moorsel	(Greece) 2004 Athens	Cycling (Road)	Women's road time trial
Gold	Anky van Grunsven	(Greece) 2004 Athens	Equestrian	Individual dressage
Gold	Pieter van den Hoogenband	(Greece) 2004 Athens	Swimming	Men's 100 m freestyle
Gold	Inge de Bruijn	(Greece) 2004 Athens	Swimming	Women's 50 m freestyle
Silver	Mia Audina	(Greece) 2004 Athens	Badminton	Women's singles
Silver	Theo Bos	(Greece) 2004 Athens	Cycling (Track)	Men's sprint
Silver	Field hockey team: Matthijs Brouwer Ronald Brouwer Jeroen Delmee Geert-Jan Derikx Rob Derikx Marten Eikelboom Floris Evers Erik Jazet Karel Klaver Jesse Mahieu Teun de Nooijer Rob Reckers Taeke Taekema Klaas Veering Guus Vogels Sander van der Weide	(Greece) 2004 Athens	Field hockey	Men's competition
Silver	Field hockey team: Minke Booij Ageeth Boomgaardt Chantal de Bruijn Lisanne de Roever Mijntje Donners Sylvia Karres Fatima Moreira de Melo Eefke Mulder Maartje Scheepstra Janneke Schopman Clarinda Sinnige Minke Smabers Jiske Snoeks Macha van der Vaart Miek van Geenhuizen Lieve van Kessel	(Greece) 2004 Athens	Field hockey	Women's competition
Silver	Edith Bosch	(Greece) 2004 Athens	Judo	Women's 70 kg
Silver	Michiel Bartman; Chun Wei Cheung; Geert-Jan Derksen; Gerritjan Eggenkamp; Jan-Willem Gabriëls; Daniël Mensch; Diederik Simon; Matthijs Vellenga; Gijs Vermeulen	(Greece) 2004 Athens	Rowing	Men's eight
Silver	Pieter van den Hoogenband	(Greece) 2004 Athens	Swimming	Men's 200 m freestyle
Silver	Johan Kenkhuis; Pieter van den Hoogenband; Mark Veens; Mitja Zastrow; Klaas-Erik Zwering	(Greece) 2004 Athens	Swimming	Men's 4 × 100 m freestyle relay
Silver	Inge de Bruijn	(Greece) 2004 Athens	Swimming	Women's 100 m freestyle
Bronze	Bart Brentjens	(Greece) 2004 Athens	Cycling (Mountain biking)	Men's cross-country
Bronze	Leontien van Moorsel	(Greece) 2004 Athens	Cycling (Track)	Women's individual pursuit
Bronze	Mark Huizinga	(Greece) 2004 Athens	Judo	Men's 90 kg
Bronze	Dennis van der Geest	(Greece) 2004 Athens	Judo	Men's +100 kg
Bronze	Deborah Gravenstijn	(Greece) 2004 Athens	Judo	Women's 57 kg
Bronze	Annemiek de Haan; Hurnet Dekkers; Nienke Hommes; Sarah Siegelaar; Marlies Smulders; Helen Tanger; Annemarieke van Rumpt; Froukje Wegman; Ester Workel	(Greece) 2004 Athens	Rowing	Women's eight
Bronze	Kirsten van der Kolk; Marit van Eupen	(Greece) 2004 Athens	Rowing	Women's lightweight double sculls
Bronze	Inge de Bruijn	(Greece) 2004 Athens	Swimming	Women's 100 m butterfly
Bronze	Inge de Bruijn; Inge Dekker; Chantal Groot; Annabel Kosten; Marleen Veldhuis	(Greece) 2004 Athens	Swimming	Women's 4 × 100 m freestyle relay
Gold	Marianne Vos	(China) 2008 Beijing	Cycling (Track)	Women's points race
Gold	Anky van Grunsven	(China) 2008 Beijing	Equestrian	Individual dressage
Gold	Field hockey team: Marilyn Agliotti Naomi van As Minke Booij Wieke Dijkstra Miek van Geenhuizen Maartje Goderie Eva de Goede Ellen Hoog Fatima Moreira de Melo Eefke Mulder Maartje Paumen Sophie Polkamp Lisanne de Roever Janneke Schopman Minke Smabers Lidewij Welten	(China) 2008 Beijing	Field hockey	Women's tournament
Gold	Marit van Eupen; Kirsten van der Kolk	(China) 2008 Beijing	Rowing	Women's Lightweight double sculls
Gold	Inge Dekker; Ranomi Kromowidjojo; Femke Heemskerk; Marleen Veldhuis; Hinkelien Schreuder; Manon van Rooijen	(China) 2008 Beijing	Swimming	Women's 4 × 100 m freestyle relay
Gold	Maarten van der Weijden	(China) 2008 Beijing	Swimming	Men's marathon 10 kilometre
Gold	Water polo team: Iefke van Belkum Gillian van den Berg Daniëlle de Bruijn Mieke Cabout Rianne Guichelaar Biurakn Hakhverdian Marieke van den Ham Noeki Klein Simone Koot Ilse van der Meijden Meike de Nooy Alette Sijbring Yasemin Smit	(China) 2008 Beijing	Water polo	Women's tournament
Silver	Anky van Grunsven; Hans Peter Minderhoud; Imke Schellekens-Bartels	(China) 2008 Beijing	Equestrian	Team dressage
Silver	Deborah Gravenstijn	(China) 2008 Beijing	Judo	Women's 57 kg
Silver	Femke Dekker; Annemiek de Haan; Nienke Kingma; Roline Repelaer van Driel; Annemarieke van Rumpt; Sarah Siegelaar; Marlies Smulders; Helen Tanger; Ester Workel	(China) 2008 Beijing	Rowing	Women's eight
Silver	Annemieke Bes; Mandy Mulder; Merel Witteveen	(China) 2008 Beijing	Sailing	Yngling class
Silver	Lobke Berkhout; Marcelien de Koning	(China) 2008 Beijing	Sailing	Women's 470 class
Bronze	Ruben Houkes	(China) 2008 Beijing	Judo	Men's 60 kg
Bronze	Elisabeth Willeboordse	(China) 2008 Beijing	Judo	Women's 63 kg
Bronze	Edith Bosch	(China) 2008 Beijing	Judo	Women's 70 kg
Bronze	Henk Grol	(China) 2008 Beijing	Judo	Men's 100 kg
Gold	Marianne Vos	(United Kingdom) 2012 London	Cycling (Road)	Women's road race
Gold	Ranomi Kromowidjojo	(United Kingdom) 2012 London	Swimming	Women's 100 m freestyle
Gold	Ranomi Kromowidjojo	(United Kingdom) 2012 London	Swimming	Women's 50 m freestyle
Gold	Dorian van Rijsselberghe	(United Kingdom) 2012 London	Sailing	Men's sailboard
Gold	Epke Zonderland	(United Kingdom) 2012 London	Gymnastics	Men's horizontal bar
Gold	Women's field hockey team: Marilyn Agliotti Naomi van As Merel de Blaeij Carlien Dirkse van den Heuvel Margot van Geffen Maartje Goderie Eva de Goede Ellen Hoog Kelly Jonker Kim Lammers Caia van Maasakker Kitty van Male Maartje Paumen Sophie Polkamp Joyce Sombroek Lidewij Welten	(United Kingdom) 2012 London	Field hockey	Women's tournament
Silver	Inge Dekker; Femke Heemskerk; Ranomi Kromowidjojo; Marleen Veldhuis; Hinkelien Schreuder	(United Kingdom) 2012 London	Swimming	Women's 4 × 100 m freestyle relay
Silver	Marit Bouwmeester	(United Kingdom) 2012 London	Sailing	Women's Laser Radial class
Silver	Marc Houtzager; Gerco Schröder; Maikel van der Vleuten; Jur Vrieling	(United Kingdom) 2012 London	Equestrian	Team jumping
Silver	Gerco Schröder	(United Kingdom) 2012 London	Equestrian	Individual jumping
Silver	Adelinde Cornelissen	(United Kingdom) 2012 London	Equestrian	Individual dressage
Silver	Men's field hockey team: Sander Baart Billy Bakker Marcel Balkestein Floris Evers Rogier Hofman Robert van der Horst Tim Jenniskens Wouter Jolie Robbert Kempermann Teun de Nooijer Jaap Stockmann Valentin Verga Klaas Vermeulen Bob de Voogd Mink van der Weerden Roderick Weusthof Sander de Wijn	(United Kingdom) 2012 London	Field hockey	Men's tournament
Bronze	Marleen Veldhuis	(United Kingdom) 2012 London	Swimming	50 m freestyle
Bronze	Henk Grol	(United Kingdom) 2012 London	Judo	Men's 100 kg
Bronze	Edith Bosch	(United Kingdom) 2012 London	Judo	Women's 70 kg
Bronze	Chantal Achterberg; Claudia Belderbos; Carline Bouw; Sytske de Groot; Annemiek de Haan; Nienke Kingma; Anne Schellekens; Roline Repelaer van Driel; Jacobine Veenhoven	(United Kingdom) 2012 London	Rowing	Women's eight
Bronze	Anky van Grunsven; Edward Gal; Adelinde Cornelissen	(United Kingdom) 2012 London	Equestrian	Team dressage
Bronze	Teun Mulder	(United Kingdom) 2012 London	Cycling (Track)	Men's Keirin
Bronze	Lobke Berkhout; Lisa Westerhof	(United Kingdom) 2012 London	Sailing	Women's 470 class
Bronze	Laura Smulders	(United Kingdom) 2012 London	Cycling (BMX)	Women's BMX
Gold	Anna van der Breggen	(Brazil) 2016 Rio de Janeiro	Cycling (Road)	Women's road race
Gold	Maaike Head; Ilse Paulis	(Brazil) 2016 Rio de Janeiro	Rowing	Women's lightweight double sculls
Gold	Elis Ligtlee	(Brazil) 2016 Rio de Janeiro	Cycling (Track)	Women's keirin
Gold	Dorian van Rijsselberghe	(Brazil) 2016 Rio de Janeiro	Sailing	Men's RS:X
Gold	Sharon van Rouwendaal	(Brazil) 2016 Rio de Janeiro	Swimming	Women's marathon 10 kilometre
Gold	Sanne Wevers	(Brazil) 2016 Rio de Janeiro	Gymnastics	Women's balance beam
Gold	Ferry Weertman	(Brazil) 2016 Rio de Janeiro	Swimming	Men's marathon 10 kilometre
Gold	Marit Bouwmeester	(Brazil) 2016 Rio de Janeiro	Sailing	Laser Radial
Silver	Tom Dumoulin	(Brazil) 2016 Rio de Janeiro	Cycling (Road)	Men's road time trial
Silver	Chantal Achterberg; Nicole Beukers; Carline Bouw; Inge Janssen	(Brazil) 2016 Rio de Janeiro	Rowing	Women's quadruple sculls
Silver	Matthijs Büchli	(Brazil) 2016 Rio de Janeiro	Cycling (Track)	Men's keirin
Silver	Dafne Schippers	(Brazil) 2016 Rio de Janeiro	Athletics	Women's 200 metres
Silver	Jelle van Gorkom	(Brazil) 2016 Rio de Janeiro	Cycling (BMX)	Men's BMX
Silver	Women's field hockey team: Naomi van As Willemijn Bos Carlien Dirkse van den Heuvel Margot van Geffen Eva de Goede Ellen Hoog Kelly Jonker Marloes Keetels Laurien Leurink Caia van Maasakker Kitty van Male Maartje Paumen Joyce Sombroek Maria Verschoor Xan de Waard Lidewij Welten	(Brazil) 2016 Rio de Janeiro	Field hockey	Women's tournament
Silver	Nouchka Fontijn	(Brazil) 2016 Rio de Janeiro	Boxing	Women's middle weight
Bronze	Anicka van Emden	(Brazil) 2016 Rio de Janeiro	Judo	Women's 63 kg
Bronze	Anna van der Breggen	(Brazil) 2016 Rio de Janeiro	Cycling (Road)	Women's road time trial
Bronze	Kaj Hendriks; Robert Lücken; Boaz Meylink; Boudewijn Röell; Olivier Siegelaar; Dirk Uittenbogaard; Mechiel Versluis; Tone Wieten; Peter Wiersum	(Brazil) 2016 Rio de Janeiro	Rowing	Men's eight
Bronze	Alexander Brouwer; Robert Meeuwsen	(Brazil) 2016 Rio de Janeiro	Beach volleyball	Men's tournament
Gold	Abe Wiersma; Dirk Uittenbogaard; Koen Metsemakers; Tone Wieten	(Japan) 2020 Tokyo	Rowing	Men's quadruple sculls
Gold	Annemiek van Vleuten	(Japan) 2020 Tokyo	Cycling (Road)	Women's road time trial
Gold	Niek Kimmann	(Japan) 2020 Tokyo	Cycling (BMX)	Men's BMX racing
Gold	Kiran Badloe	(Japan) 2020 Tokyo	Sailing	Men's RS:X
Gold	Sifan Hassan	(Japan) 2020 Tokyo	Athletics	Women's 5000 metres
Gold	Jeffrey Hoogland; Harrie Lavreysen; Roy van den Berg; Matthijs Büchli	(Japan) 2020 Tokyo	Cycling (Track)	Men's team sprint
Gold	Shanne Braspennincx	(Japan) 2020 Tokyo	Cycling (Track)	Women's keirin
Gold	Harrie Lavreysen	(Japan) 2020 Tokyo	Cycling (Track)	Men's sprint
Gold	Women's field hockey team: Felice Albers Margot van Geffen Eva de Goede Marloes Keetels Josine Koning Sanne Koolen Laurien Leurink Caia van Maasakker Frédérique Matla Laura Nunnink Malou Pheninckx Pien Sanders Lauren Stam Maria Verschoor Xan de Waard Lidewij Welten	(Japan) 2020 Tokyo	Field hockey	Women's tournament
Gold	Sifan Hassan	(Japan) 2020 Tokyo	Athletics	Women's 10,000 metres
Silver	Gabriela Schloesser; Steve Wijler	(Japan) 2020 Tokyo	Archery	Mixed Team
Silver	Annemiek van Vleuten	(Japan) 2020 Tokyo	Cycling (Road)	Women's road race
Silver	Arno Kamminga	(Japan) 2020 Tokyo	Swimming	Men's 100m Breaststroke
Silver	Melvin Twellaar; Stef Broenink	(Japan) 2020 Tokyo	Rowing	Men's double sculls
Silver	Ellen Hogerwerf; Karolien Florijn; Veronique Meester; Ymkje Clevering	(Japan) 2020 Tokyo	Rowing	Women's coxless four
Silver	Tom Dumoulin	(Japan) 2020 Tokyo	Cycling (Road)	Men's road time trial
Silver	Arno Kamminga	(Japan) 2020 Tokyo	Swimming	Men's 200 metre breaststroke
Silver	Sharon van Rouwendaal	(Japan) 2020 Tokyo	Swimming	Women's marathon 10 km
Silver	Anouk Vetter	(Japan) 2020 Tokyo	Athletics	Women's heptathlon
Silver	Jeffrey Hoogland	(Japan) 2020 Tokyo	Cycling (Track)	Men's sprint
Silver	Terrence Agard; Ramsey Angela; Liemarvin Bonevacia; Tony van Diepen; Jochem Dobber	(Japan) 2020 Tokyo	Athletics	Men's 4 × 400 metres relay
Silver	Abdi Nageeye	(Japan) 2020 Tokyo	Athletics	Men's marathon
Bronze	Lisa Scheenaard; Roos de Jong	(Japan) 2020 Tokyo	Rowing	Women's double sculls
Bronze	Anna van der Breggen	(Japan) 2020 Tokyo	Cycling (Road)	Women's road time trial
Bronze	Sanne van Dijke	(Japan) 2020 Tokyo	Judo	Women's 70 kg
Bronze	Ilse Paulis; Marieke Keijser	(Japan) 2020 Tokyo	Rowing	Women's lightweight double sculls
Bronze	Merel Smulders	(Japan) 2020 Tokyo	Cycling (BMX)	Women's BMX racing
Bronze	Marit Bouwmeester	(Japan) 2020 Tokyo	Sailing	Women's laser radial
Bronze	Annemiek Bekkering; Annette Duetz	(Japan) 2020 Tokyo	Sailing	Women's 49er FX
Bronze	Femke Bol	(Japan) 2020 Tokyo	Athletics	Women's 400 metres hurdles
Bronze	Maikel van der Vleuten	(Japan) 2020 Tokyo	Equestrian	Individual jumping
Bronze	Emma Oosterwegel	(Japan) 2020 Tokyo	Athletics	Women's heptathlon
Bronze	Nouchka Fontijn	(Japan) 2020 Tokyo	Boxing	Women's middleweight
Bronze	Sifan Hassan	(Japan) 2020 Tokyo	Athletics	Women's 1500 metres
Bronze	Harrie Lavreysen	(Japan) 2020 Tokyo	Cycling (Track)	Men's keirin
Bronze	Kirsten Wild	(Japan) 2020 Tokyo	Cycling (Track)	Women's omnium
Gold	Lennart van Lierop; Finn Florijn; Tone Wieten; Koen Metsemakers	(France) 2024 Paris	Rowing	Men's quadruple sculls
Gold	Benthe Boonstra; Hermijntje Drenth; Tinka Offereins; Marloes Oldenburg	(France) 2024 Paris	Rowing	Women's coxless four
Gold	Ymkje Clevering; Veronique Meester	(France) 2024 Paris	Rowing	Women's coxless pair
Gold	Odile van Aanholt; Annette Duetz	(France) 2024 Paris	Sailing	Women's 49er FX
Gold	Karolien Florijn	(France) 2024 Paris	Rowing	Women's single sculls
Gold	Isaya Klein Ikkink; Lieke Klaver; Eugene Omalla; Cathelijn Peeters; Femke Bol	(France) 2024 Paris	Athletics	Mixed 4 × 400 metres relay
Gold	Worthy de Jong; Arvin Slagter; Jan Driessen; Dimeo van der Horst	(France) 2024 Paris	Basketball	Men's 3x3 tournament
Gold	Roy van den Berg; Jeffrey Hoogland; Harrie Lavreysen	(France) 2024 Paris	Cycling (Track)	Men's team sprint
Gold	Marit Bouwmeester	(France) 2024 Paris	Sailing	ILCA 6
Gold	Sharon van Rouwendaal	(France) 2024 Paris	Swimming	10 km open water
Gold	Men's national field hockey team: Seve van Ass Lars Balk Koen Bijen Pirmin Blaak Justen Blok Thierry Brinkman Jorrit Croon Thijs van Dam Jonas de Geus Tjep Hoedemakers Jip Janssen Floris Middendorp Joep de Mol Tijmen Reyenga Duco Telgenkamp Derck de Vilder Floris Wortelboer	(France) 2024 Paris	Field hockey	Men's tournament
Gold	Harrie Lavreysen	(France) 2024 Paris	Cycling (Track)	Men's sprint
Gold	Women's national field hockey team: Felice Albers Joosje Burg Pien Dicke Luna Fokke Yibbi Jansen Marleen Jochems Sanne Koolen Renée van Laarhoven Frédérique Matla Freeke Moes Laura Nunnink Lisa Post Pien Sanders Marijn Veen Anne Veenendaal Maria Verschoor Xan de Waard	(France) 2024 Paris	Field hockey	Women's tournament
Gold	Sifan Hassan	(France) 2024 Paris	Athletics	Women's marathon
Gold	Harrie Lavreysen	(France) 2024 Paris	Cycling (Track)	Men's keirin
Silver	Laila Youssifou; Bente Paulis; Roos de Jong; Tessa Dullemans	(France) 2024 Paris	Rowing	Women's quadruple sculls
Silver	Stef Broenink; Melvin Twellaar	(France) 2024 Paris	Rowing	Men's double sculls
Silver	Manon Veenstra	(France) 2024 Paris	Cycling (BMX)	Women's BMX
Silver	Ralf Rienks; Olav Molenaar; Sander de Graaf; Ruben Knab; Gert-Jan van Doorn; Jacob van de Kerkhof; Jan van der Bij; Mick Makker; Dieuwke Fetter (cox)	(France) 2024 Paris	Rowing	Men's eight
Silver	Marianne Vos	(France) 2024 Paris	Cycling (Road)	Women's individual road race
Silver	Hetty van de Wouw	(France) 2024 Paris	Cycling (Track)	Women's keirin
Silver	Lisanne de Witte; Lieke Klaver; Eveline Saalberg; Myrte van der Schoot; Femke Bol; Cathelijn Peeters	(France) 2024 Paris	Athletics	Women's 4 × 400 metres relay
Bronze	Caspar Corbeau	(France) 2024 Paris	Swimming	Men's 200 metre breaststroke
Bronze	Tes Schouten	(France) 2024 Paris	Swimming	Women's 200 metre breaststroke
Bronze	Simon van Dorp	(France) 2024 Paris	Rowing	Men's single sculls
Bronze	Luuc van Opzeeland	(France) 2024 Paris	Sailing	Men's IQFoil
Bronze	Sifan Hassan	(France) 2024 Paris	Athletics	Women's 5000 metres
Bronze	Maikel van der Vleuten	(France) 2024 Paris	Equestrian	Individual jumping
Bronze	Annelous Lammerts	(France) 2024 Paris	Sailing	Women's Formula Kite
Bronze	Femke Bol	(France) 2024 Paris	Athletics	Women's 400 metres hurdles
Bronze	Lisa van Belle; Maike van der Duin	(France) 2024 Paris	Cycling (Track)	Women's madison
Bronze	Sifan Hassan	(France) 2024 Paris	Athletics	Women's 10,000 metres
Bronze	Women's water polo team: Laura Aarts Nina ten Broek Sarah Buis Kitty-Lynn Joustra Maartje Keuning Simone van de Kraats Lola Moolhuijzen Bente Rogge Lieke Rogge Vivian Sevenich Brigitte Sleeking Sabrina van der Sloot Iris Wolves	(France) 2024 Paris	Water polo	Women's tournament
Bronze	Bregje de Brouwer; Noortje de Brouwer	(France) 2024 Paris	Artistic swimming	Women's duet

=== Winter Olympics ===
Medal	Name	Games	Sport	Event
Silver	Kees Broekman	(Norway) 1952 Oslo	Speed skating	Men's 5000 meters
Silver	Kees Broekman	(Norway) 1952 Oslo	Speed skating	Men's 10,000 meters
Silver	Wim van der Voort	(Norway) 1952 Oslo	Speed skating	Men's 1500 meters
Silver	Sjoukje Dijkstra	(United States) 1960 Squaw Valley	Figure skating	Ladies' Singles
Bronze	Jan Pesman	(United States) 1960 Squaw Valley	Speed skating	Men's 5000 meters
Gold	Sjoukje Dijkstra	(Austria) 1964 Innsbruck	Figure skating	Ladies' Singles
Silver	Kees Verkerk	(Austria) 1964 Innsbruck	Speed skating	Men's 1500 metres
Gold	Kees Verkerk	(France) 1968 Grenoble	Speed skating	Men's 1500 metres
Gold	Carry Geijssen	(France) 1968 Grenoble	Speed skating	Women's 1000 metres
Gold	Ans Schut	(France) 1968 Grenoble	Speed skating	Women's 3000 metres
Silver	Ard Schenk	(France) 1968 Grenoble	Speed skating	Men's 1500 metres
Silver	Kees Verkerk	(France) 1968 Grenoble	Speed skating	Men's 5000 metres
Silver	Carry Geijssen	(France) 1968 Grenoble	Speed skating	Women's 1500 metres
Bronze	Peter Nottet	(France) 1968 Grenoble	Speed skating	Men's 5000 metres
Bronze	Stien Baas-Kaiser	(France) 1968 Grenoble	Speed skating	Women's 1500 metres
Bronze	Stien Baas-Kaiser	(France) 1968 Grenoble	Speed skating	Women's 3000 metres
Gold	Ard Schenk	(Japan) 1972 Sapporo	Speed skating	Men's 1500 metres
Gold	Ard Schenk	(Japan) 1972 Sapporo	Speed skating	Men's 5000 metres
Gold	Ard Schenk	(Japan) 1972 Sapporo	Speed skating	Men's 10,000 metres
Gold	Stien Baas-Kaiser	(Japan) 1972 Sapporo	Speed skating	Women's 3000 metres
Silver	Kees Verkerk	(Japan) 1972 Sapporo	Speed skating	Men's 10,000 metres
Silver	Atje Keulen-Deelstra	(Japan) 1972 Sapporo	Speed skating	Women's 1000 metres
Silver	Stien Baas-Kaiser	(Japan) 1972 Sapporo	Speed skating	Women's 1500 metres
Bronze	Atje Keulen-Deelstra	(Japan) 1972 Sapporo	Speed skating	Women's 1500 metres
Bronze	Atje Keulen-Deelstra	(Japan) 1972 Sapporo	Speed skating	Women's 3000 metres
Gold	Piet Kleine	(Austria) 1976 Innsbruck	Speed skating	Men's 10,000 metres
Silver	Dianne de Leeuw	(Austria) 1976 Innsbruck	Figure skating	Women's singles
Silver	Piet Kleine	(Austria) 1976 Innsbruck	Speed skating	Men's 5000 metres
Bronze	Hans van Helden	(Austria) 1976 Innsbruck	Speed skating	Men's 1500 metres
Bronze	Hans van Helden	(Austria) 1976 Innsbruck	Speed skating	Men's 5000 metres
Bronze	Hans van Helden	(Austria) 1976 Innsbruck	Speed skating	Men's 10,000 metres
Gold	Annie Borckink	(United States) 1980 Lake Placid	Speed skating	Women's 1500 metres
Silver	Ria Visser	(United States) 1980 Lake Placid	Speed skating	Women's 1500 metres
Silver	Piet Kleine	(United States) 1980 Lake Placid	Speed skating	Men's 10,000 metres
Bronze	Lieuwe de Boer	(United States) 1980 Lake Placid	Speed skating	Men's 500 metres
Gold	Yvonne van Gennip	(Canada) 1988 Calgary	Speed skating	Women's 1500 metres
Gold	Yvonne van Gennip	(Canada) 1988 Calgary	Speed skating	Women's 3000 metres
Gold	Yvonne van Gennip	(Canada) 1988 Calgary	Speed skating	Women's 5000 metres
Silver	Jan Ykema	(Canada) 1988 Calgary	Speed skating	Men's 500 metres
Silver	Leo Visser	(Canada) 1988 Calgary	Speed skating	Men's 5000 metres
Bronze	Gerard Kemkers	(Canada) 1988 Calgary	Speed skating	Men's 5000 metres
Bronze	Leo Visser	(Canada) 1988 Calgary	Speed skating	Men's 10,000 metres
Gold	Bart Veldkamp	(France) 1992 Albertville	Speed skating	Men's 10,000 metres
Silver	Falko Zandstra	(France) 1992 Albertville	Speed skating	Men's 5000 metres
Bronze	Leo Visser	(France) 1992 Albertville	Speed skating	Men's 1500 metres
Bronze	Leo Visser	(France) 1992 Albertville	Speed skating	Men's 5000 metres
Silver	Rintje Ritsma	(Norway) 1994 Lillehammer	Speed skating	Men's 1500 metres
Bronze	Falko Zandstra	(Norway) 1994 Lillehammer	Speed skating	Men's 1500 metres
Bronze	Rintje Ritsma	(Norway) 1994 Lillehammer	Speed skating	Men's 5000 metres
Bronze	Bart Veldkamp	(Norway) 1994 Lillehammer	Speed skating	Men's 10,000 metres
Gold	Ids Postma	(Japan) 1998 Nagano	Speed skating	Men's 1000 metres
Gold	Gianni Romme	(Japan) 1998 Nagano	Speed skating	Men's 5000 metres
Gold	Gianni Romme	(Japan) 1998 Nagano	Speed skating	Men's 10,000 metres
Gold	Marianne Timmer	(Japan) 1998 Nagano	Speed skating	Women's 1000 metres
Gold	Marianne Timmer	(Japan) 1998 Nagano	Speed skating	Women's 1500 metres
Silver	Jan Bos	(Japan) 1998 Nagano	Speed skating	Men's 1000 metres
Silver	Ids Postma	(Japan) 1998 Nagano	Speed skating	Men's 1500 metres
Silver	Rintje Ritsma	(Japan) 1998 Nagano	Speed skating	Men's 5000 metres
Silver	Bob de Jong	(Japan) 1998 Nagano	Speed skating	Men's 10,000 metres
Bronze	Rintje Ritsma	(Japan) 1998 Nagano	Speed skating	Men's 1500 metres
Bronze	Rintje Ritsma	(Japan) 1998 Nagano	Speed skating	Men's 10,000 metres
Gold	Jochem Uytdehaage	(United States) 2002 Salt Lake City	Speed skating	Men's 10,000 metres
Gold	Gerard van Velde	(United States) 2002 Salt Lake City	Speed skating	Men's 1000 metres
Gold	Jochem Uytdehaage	(United States) 2002 Salt Lake City	Speed skating	Men's 5000 metres
Silver	Gianni Romme	(United States) 2002 Salt Lake City	Speed skating	Men's 10,000 metres
Silver	Jan Bos	(United States) 2002 Salt Lake City	Speed skating	Men's 1000 metres
Silver	Jochem Uytdehaage	(United States) 2002 Salt Lake City	Speed skating	Men's 1500 metres
Silver	Renate Groenewold	(United States) 2002 Salt Lake City	Speed skating	Women's 3000 metres
Silver	Gretha Smit	(United States) 2002 Salt Lake City	Speed skating	Women's 5000 metres
Gold	Ireen Wüst	(Italy) 2006 Turin	Speed skating	Women's 3000 m
Gold	Marianne Timmer	(Italy) 2006 Turin	Speed skating	Women's 1000 m
Gold	Bob de Jong	(Italy) 2006 Turin	Speed skating	Men's 10,000 m
Silver	Sven Kramer	(Italy) 2006 Turin	Speed skating	Men's 5000 m
Silver	Renate Groenewold	(Italy) 2006 Turin	Speed skating	Women's 3000 m
Bronze	Sven Kramer; Rintje Ritsma; Mark Tuitert; Carl Verheijen; Erben Wennemars	(Italy) 2006 Turin	Speed skating	Men's team pursuit
Bronze	Erben Wennemars	(Italy) 2006 Turin	Speed skating	Men's 1000 m
Bronze	Ireen Wüst	(Italy) 2006 Turin	Speed skating	Women's 1500 m
Bronze	Carl Verheijen	(Italy) 2006 Turin	Speed skating	Men's 10,000 m
Gold	Sven Kramer	(Canada) 2010 Vancouver	Speed skating	Men's 5000 metres
Gold	Mark Tuitert	(Canada) 2010 Vancouver	Speed skating	Men's 1500 metres
Gold	Ireen Wüst	(Canada) 2010 Vancouver	Speed skating	Women's 1500 metres
Gold	Nicolien Sauerbreij	(Canada) 2010 Vancouver	Snowboarding	Women's parallel giant slaloms
Silver	Annette Gerritsen	(Canada) 2010 Vancouver	Speed skating	Women's 1000 metres
Bronze	Laurine van Riessen	(Canada) 2010 Vancouver	Speed skating	Women's 1000 metres
Bronze	Bob de Jong	(Canada) 2010 Vancouver	Speed skating	Men's 10,000 metres
Bronze	Jan Blokhuijsen; Sven Kramer; Simon Kuipers; Mark Tuitert	(Canada) 2010 Vancouver	Speed skating	Men's team pursuit
Gold	Sven Kramer	(Russia) 2014 Sochi	Speed skating	Men's 5000 metres
Gold	Ireen Wüst	(Russia) 2014 Sochi	Speed skating	Women's 3000 metres
Gold	Michel Mulder	(Russia) 2014 Sochi	Speed skating	Men's 500 metres
Gold	Stefan Groothuis	(Russia) 2014 Sochi	Speed skating	Men's 1000 metres
Gold	Jorien ter Mors	(Russia) 2014 Sochi	Speed skating	Women's 1500 metres
Gold	Jorrit Bergsma	(Russia) 2014 Sochi	Speed skating	Men's 10,000 metres
Gold	Jan Blokhuijsen; Sven Kramer; Koen Verweij	(Russia) 2014 Sochi	Speed skating	Men's team pursuit
Gold	Lotte van Beek; Marrit Leenstra; Jorien ter Mors; Ireen Wüst	(Russia) 2014 Sochi	Speed skating	Women's team pursuit
Silver	Jan Blokhuijsen	(Russia) 2014 Sochi	Speed skating	Men's 5000 metres
Silver	Jan Smeekens	(Russia) 2014 Sochi	Speed skating	Men's 500 metres
Silver	Ireen Wüst	(Russia) 2014 Sochi	Speed skating	Women's 1000 metres
Silver	Koen Verweij	(Russia) 2014 Sochi	Speed skating	Men's 1500 metres
Silver	Ireen Wüst	(Russia) 2014 Sochi	Speed skating	Women's 1500 metres
Silver	Sven Kramer	(Russia) 2014 Sochi	Speed skating	Men's 10,000 metres
Silver	Ireen Wüst	(Russia) 2014 Sochi	Speed skating	Women's 5000 metres
Bronze	Jorrit Bergsma	(Russia) 2014 Sochi	Speed skating	Men's 5000 metres
Bronze	Ronald Mulder	(Russia) 2014 Sochi	Speed skating	Men's 500 metres
Bronze	Margot Boer	(Russia) 2014 Sochi	Speed skating	Women's 500 metres
Bronze	Michel Mulder	(Russia) 2014 Sochi	Speed skating	Men's 1000 metres
Bronze	Margot Boer	(Russia) 2014 Sochi	Speed skating	Women's 1000 metres
Bronze	Sjinkie Knegt	(Russia) 2014 Sochi	Short track speed skating	Men's 1000 metres
Bronze	Lotte van Beek	(Russia) 2014 Sochi	Speed skating	Women's 1500 metres
Bronze	Bob de Jong	(Russia) 2014 Sochi	Speed skating	Men's 10,000 metres
Bronze	Carien Kleibeuker	(Russia) 2014 Sochi	Speed skating	Women's 5000 metres
Gold	Carlijn Achtereekte	(South Korea) 2018 Pyeongchang	Speed skating	Women's 3000 metres
Gold	Sven Kramer	(South Korea) 2018 Pyeongchang	Speed skating	Men's 5000 metres
Gold	Ireen Wüst	(South Korea) 2018 Pyeongchang	Speed skating	Women's 1500 metres
Gold	Kjeld Nuis	(South Korea) 2018 Pyeongchang	Speed skating	Men's 1500 metres
Gold	Jorien ter Mors	(South Korea) 2018 Pyeongchang	Speed skating	Women's 1000 metres
Gold	Esmee Visser	(South Korea) 2018 Pyeongchang	Speed skating	Women's 5000 metres
Gold	Suzanne Schulting	(South Korea) 2018 Pyeongchang	Short track speed skating	Women's 1000 metres
Gold	Kjeld Nuis	(South Korea) 2018 Pyeongchang	Speed skating	Men's 1000 metres
Silver	Ireen Wüst	(South Korea) 2018 Pyeongchang	Speed skating	Women's 3000 metres
Silver	Sjinkie Knegt	(South Korea) 2018 Pyeongchang	Short track speed skating	Men's 1500 metres
Silver	Patrick Roest	(South Korea) 2018 Pyeongchang	Speed skating	Men's 1500 metres
Silver	Yara van Kerkhof	(South Korea) 2018 Pyeongchang	Short track speed skating	Women's 500 metres
Silver	Jorrit Bergsma	(South Korea) 2018 Pyeongchang	Speed skating	Men's 10,000 metres
Silver	Lotte van Beek; Antoinette de Jong; Marrit Leenstra; Ireen Wüst	(South Korea) 2018 Pyeongchang	Speed skating	Women's team pursuit
Bronze	Antoinette de Jong	(South Korea) 2018 Pyeongchang	Speed skating	Women's 3000 metres
Bronze	Marrit Leenstra	(South Korea) 2018 Pyeongchang	Speed skating	Women's 1500 metres
Bronze	Yara van Kerkhof; Jorien ter Mors; Lara van Ruijven; Suzanne Schulting	(South Korea) 2018 Pyeongchang	Short track speed skating	Women's 3000 metre relay
Bronze	Jan Blokhuijsen; Sven Kramer; Patrick Roest; Koen Verweij	(South Korea) 2018 Pyeongchang	Speed skating	Men's team pursuit
Bronze	Irene Schouten	(South Korea) 2018 Pyeongchang	Speed skating	Women's mass start
Bronze	Koen Verweij	(South Korea) 2018 Pyeongchang	Speed skating	Men's mass start
Gold	Irene Schouten	(China) 2022 Beijing	Speed skating	Women's 3000 metres
Gold	Ireen Wüst	(China) 2022 Beijing	Speed skating	Women's 1500 metres
Gold	Kjeld Nuis	(China) 2022 Beijing	Speed skating	Men's 1500 metres
Gold	Irene Schouten	(China) 2022 Beijing	Speed skating	Women's 5000 metres
Gold	Suzanne Schulting	(China) 2022 Beijing	Short track speed skating	Women's 1000 metres
Gold	Suzanne Schulting; Selma Poutsma; Xandra Velzeboer; Yara van Kerkhof	(China) 2022 Beijing	Short track speed skating	Women's 3000 metre relay
Gold	Thomas Krol	(China) 2022 Beijing	Speed skating	Men's 1000 metres
Gold	Irene Schouten	(China) 2022 Beijing	Speed skating	Women's mass start
Silver	Patrick Roest	(China) 2022 Beijing	Speed skating	Men's 5000 metres
Silver	Suzanne Schulting	(China) 2022 Beijing	Short track speed skating	Women's 500 metres
Silver	Thomas Krol	(China) 2022 Beijing	Speed skating	Men's 1500 metres
Silver	Patrick Roest	(China) 2022 Beijing	Speed skating	Men's 10,000 metres
Silver	Jutta Leerdam	(China) 2022 Beijing	Speed skating	Women's 1000 metres
Bronze	Antoinette de Jong	(China) 2022 Beijing	Speed skating	Women's 1500 metres
Bronze	Kimberley Bos	(China) 2022 Beijing	Skeleton	Women's
Bronze	Marijke Groenewoud; Antoinette de Jong; Irene Schouten; Ireen Wüst	(China) 2022 Beijing	Speed skating	Women's team pursuit
Bronze	Suzanne Schulting	(China) 2022 Beijing	Short track speed skating	Women's 1500 metres
Gold	Jutta Leerdam	(Italy) 2026 Milano Cortina	Speed skating	Women's 1000 metres
Gold	Jens van 't Wout	(Italy) 2026 Milano Cortina	Short track speed skating	Men's 1000 metres
Gold	Xandra Velzeboer	(Italy) 2026 Milano Cortina	Short track speed skating	Women's 500 metres
Gold	Jens van 't Wout	(Italy) 2026 Milano Cortina	Short track speed skating	Men's 1500 metres
Gold	Femke Kok	(Italy) 2026 Milano Cortina	Speed skating	Women's 500 metres
Gold	Xandra Velzeboer	(Italy) 2026 Milano Cortina	Short track speed skating	Women's 1000 metres
Gold	Teun Boer; Friso Emons; Jens van 't Wout; Melle van 't Wout; Itzhak de Laat	(Italy) 2026 Milano Cortina	Short track speed skating	Men's 5000 metre relay
Gold	Antoinette Rijpma-de Jong	(Italy) 2026 Milano Cortina	Speed skating	Women's 1500 metres
Gold	Jorrit Bergsma	(Italy) 2026 Milano Cortina	Speed skating	Men's mass start
Gold	Marijke Groenewoud	(Italy) 2026 Milano Cortina	Speed skating	Women's mass start
Silver	Femke Kok	(Italy) 2026 Milano Cortina	Speed skating	Women's 1000 metres
Silver	Jenning de Boo	(Italy) 2026 Milano Cortina	Speed skating	Men's 1000 metres
Silver	Merel Conijn	(Italy) 2026 Milano Cortina	Speed skating	Women's 5000 metres
Silver	Jenning de Boo	(Italy) 2026 Milano Cortina	Speed skating	Men's 500 metres
Silver	Jutta Leerdam	(Italy) 2026 Milano Cortina	Speed skating	Women's 500 metres
Silver	Joy Beune; Marijke Groenewoud; Antoinette Rijpma-de Jong	(Italy) 2026 Milano Cortina	Speed skating	Women's team pursuit
Silver	Melle van 't Wout	(Italy) 2026 Milano Cortina	Short track speed skating	Men's 500 metres
Bronze	Jorrit Bergsma	(Italy) 2026 Milano Cortina	Speed skating	Men's 10,000 metres
Bronze	Jens van 't Wout	(Italy) 2026 Milano Cortina	Short track speed skating	Men's 500 metres
Bronze	Kjeld Nuis	(Italy) 2026 Milano Cortina	Speed skating	Men's 1500 metres

== Most successful Dutch competitors ==
=== Individual athletes ===
No	Athlete	Sport	1st place, gold medalist(s)	2nd place, silver medalist(s)	3rd place, bronze medalist(s)	Total	Games at which medals were won
1	Ireen Wüst	Speed skating	6	5	2	13	2006 Turin, 2010 Vancouver, 2014 Sochi, 2018 Pyeongchang, 2022 Beijing
2	Harrie Lavreysen	Cycling	5	0	1	6	2020 Tokyo, 2024 Paris
3	Sven Kramer	Speed skating	4	2	3	9	2006 Turin, 2010 Vancouver, 2014 Sochi, 2018 Pyeongchang
4	Inge de Bruijn	Swimming	4	2	2	8	2000 Sydney, 2004 Athens
5	Leontien van Moorsel	Cycling	4	1	1	6	2000 Sydney, 2004 Athens
6	Charles Pahud de Mortanges	Equestrian	4	1	0	5	1924 Paris, 1928 Amsterdam, 1932 Los Angeles
7	Fanny Blankers-Koen	Athletics	4	0	0	4	1948 London
8	Anky van Grunsven	Equestrian	3	5	1	9	1992 Barcelona, 1996 Atlanta, 2000 Sydney, 2004 Athens, 2008 Beijing, 2012 London
9	Pieter van den Hoogenband	Swimming	3	2	2	7	2000 Sydney, 2004 Athens
10	Suzanne Schulting	Short track speed skating	3	1	2	6	2018 Pyeongchang, 2022 Beijing
11	Eva de Goede	Field hockey	3	1	0	4	2008 Beijing, 2012 London, 2016 Rio de Janeiro, 2020 Tokyo
11	Ranomi Kromowidjojo	Swimming	3	1	0	4	2008 Beijing, 2012 London
11	Rie Mastenbroek	Swimming	3	1	0	4	1936 Berlin
11	Ard Schenk	Speed skating	3	1	0	4	1968 Grenoble, 1972 Sapporo
11	Lidewij Welten	Field hockey	3	1	0	4	2008 Beijing, 2012 London, 2016 Rio de Janeiro, 2020 Tokyo
16	Sifan Hassan	Athletics	3	0	3	6	2020 Tokyo, 2024 Paris
17	Irene Schouten	Speed skating	3	0	2	5	2018 Pyeongchang, 2022 Beijing
18	Jorien ter Mors	Speed skating Short track speed skating	3	0	1	4	2014 Sochi, 2018 Pyeongchang
18	Kjeld Nuis	Speed skating	3	0	1	4	2018 Pyeongchang, 2022 Beijing, 2026 Milano Cortina
18	Jens van 't Wout	Short track speed skating	3	0	1	4	2026 Milano Cortina
21	Yvonne van Gennip	Speed skating	3	0	0	3	1988 Calgary
21	Marianne Timmer	Speed skating	3	0	0	3	1998 Nagano, 2006 Turin
21	Xandra Velzeboer	Short track speed skating	3	0	0	3	2022 Beijing, 2026 Milano Cortina
21	Adolph van der Voort van Zijp	Equestrian	3	0	0	3	1924 Paris, 1928 Amsterdam

=== Team performances ===
No	Sport	Team	1st place, gold medalist(s)	2nd place, silver medalist(s)	3rd place, bronze medalist(s)	Total
1	Field hockey	Netherlands women's national field hockey team	5	2	3	10
2	Field hockey	Netherlands men's national field hockey team	3	4	3	10
3	Swimming	Women's 4 × 100 m freestyle relay	2	6	4	12
4	Equestrian	Eventing team competition	2	1	0	3
4	Rowing	Men's quadruple sculls	2	1	0	3
6	Rowing	Women's lightweight double sculls	2	0	2	4
7	Cycling	Men's road team time trial	2	0	0	2
7	Cycling	Men's team sprint	2	0	0	2

== Medals by sport ==
=== Rowing ===
Games	No. Rowers	Events	Gold	Silver	Bronze	Total	Ranking
1896 Athens	Event wasn't held						
1900 Paris	14	2/5	0	1	1	2	5
1904 St Louis	0	0/5	0	0	0	0	
1908 London	4	1/5	0	0	1	1	5=
1912 Stockholm	0	0/4	0	0	0	0	
1916	Games Cancelled						
1920 Antwerp	12	3/5	0	0	0	0	
1924 Paris	17	4/7	1	0	0	1	4
1928 Amsterdam	25	7/7	0	0	0	0	
1932 Los Angeles	2	1/7	0	0	0	0	
1936 Berlin	15	5/7	0	0	0	0	
1940	Games Cancelled						
1944	Games Cancelled						
1948 London	6	2/7	0	0	0	0	
1952 Helsinki	12	4/7	0	0	0	0	
1956 Melbourne	0	0/7	0	0	0	0	
1960 Rome	13	5/7	0	0	0	0	
1964 Tokyo	17	6/7	0	1	2	3	6
1968 Mexico City	22	6/7	1	2	0	3	2
1972 Munich	21	5/7	0	0	1	1	10=
1976 Montreal	28	7/14	0	0	0	0	
1980	10	3/14	0	0	0	0	
1984 Los Angeles	26	8/14	0	1	1	2	10=
1988	16	6/14	1	0	0	1	
1992 Barcelona	20	8/14	0	0	1	1	14=
1996 Atlanta	37	9/14	1	1	1	3	6
2000 Sydney	35	9/14	0	3	0	3	11
2004 Athens	26	6/14	0	1	2	3	12
2008 Beijing	29	6/14	1	1	0	2	5=
2012 London	32	7/14	0	0	1	1	15=
2016 Rio	36	8/14	1	1	1	3	5
2020 Tokyo	35	11/14	1	2	2	5	3
2024 Paris	35	11/14	4	3	1	8	1
Total	545	264	11	17	15	43	9

=== Sailing ===
Games	No. Sailors	Events	Gold	Silver	Bronze	Total	Ranking
1896	Scheduled but event wasn't held						
1900	9	3/13	0	1	0	1	6
1904	Not Scheduled						
1908	0	0/4	0	0	0	0	
1912	0	0/4	0	0	0	0	
1916	Games Cancelled						
1920	8	3/14	2	1	0	3	2
1924	4	2/3	0	0	1	1	5
1928	12	3/3	0	1	0	1	4
1932	3	2/4	0	1	0	1	5
1936	8	3/4	1	0	1	2	=2
1940	Games Cancelled						
1944	Games Cancelled						
1948	8	4/5	0	0	2	2	9
1952	9	4/5	0	0	0	0	
1956	0	0/5	0	0	0	0	
1960	6	3/5	0	0	0	0	
1964	6	3/5	0	0	0	0	
1968	6	3/5	0	0	0	0	
1972	5	3/6	0	0	0	0	
1976	9	4/6	0	0	0	0	
1980	12	6/6	0	0	0	0	
1984	8	5/7	1	0	0	1	3
1988	12	7/8	0	0	0	0	
1992	14	8/10	0	0	1	1	9
1996	12	8/10	0	1	1	2	10
2000	9	5/11	0	1	0	1	11
2004	14	8/11	0	0	0	0	
2008	12	7/11	0	2	0	2	8
2012	11	7/10	1	1	1	3	4
2016	11	8/10	2	0	0	2	2
2020	10	7/10	1	0	2	3	3
2024 Paris	11	8/10	2	0	2	4	1
Total	229	124 / 205	10	9	11	30	9

== See also ==
- List of flag bearers for the Netherlands at the Olympics
- Netherlands at the Paralympics
