= Van Heumen =

Van Heumen is a Dutch surname. Notable people with the surname include:

- Gijs van Heumen (born 1952), Dutch field hockey coach
- Harrie van Heumen (born 1959), Dutch ice hockey player
- Wim van Heumen (1928–1992), Dutch field hockey coach
