= Hellemans =

Hellemans is a surname. Notable people with the surname include:

- Alfons Hellemans (born 1939), Belgian racing cyclist
- August Hellemans (1907–1992), Belgian footballer and manager
- Greet Hellemans (born 1959), Dutch rower
- Nicolette Hellemans (born 1961), Dutch rower, sister of Greet
