= Peter Drost =

Dutch swimmer (born 1958)

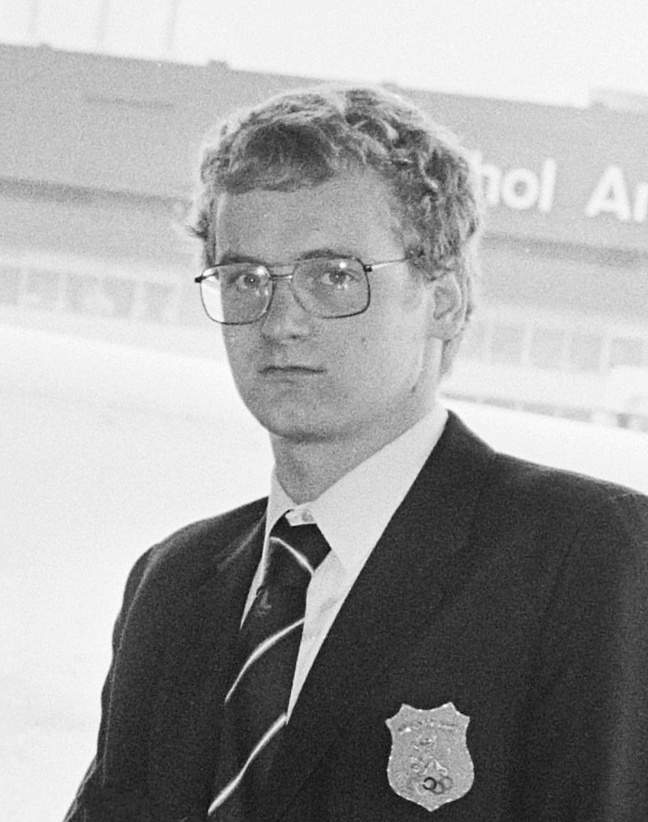
- Peter Drost in 1980

Personal information
- Born: 25 February 1958 (age 67); Amersfoort, Utrecht, the Netherlands
- Height: 1.92 m (6 ft 4 in)
- Weight: 84 kg (185 lb)

Sport
- Sport: Swimming
- Club: AZ&PC, Amersfoort

Peter Willem Drost (born 25 February 1958) is a former freestyle swimmer from the Netherlands, who competed at the 1980 and 1984 Summer Olympics. His best individual result came in 1984, when he finished in seventh place (7:26.72) in the 4×200 m freestyle relay, alongside his younger brother Frank, Hans Kroes and Edsard Schlingemann. He is not related to Monique Drost, who is also a retired swimmer who competed at the 1980 Olympics.
