= Monique Drost =

Dutch swimmer (born 1964)

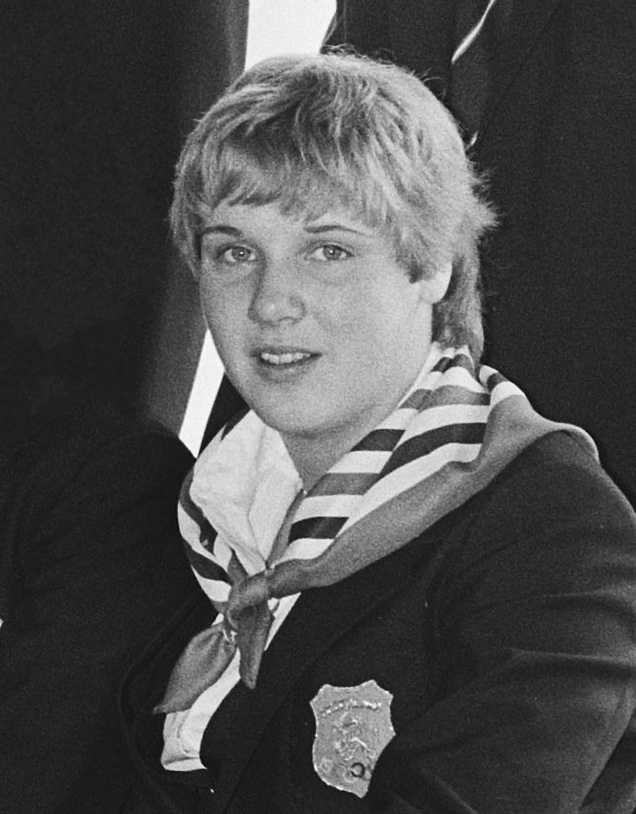
- Monique Drost in 1980

Personal information
- Born: 8 October 1964 (age 61) Amersfoort, Utrecht, Netherlands
- Height: 1.75 m (5 ft 9 in)
- Weight: 71 kg (157 lb)

Sport
- Club: AZ&PC, Amersfoort
Medal record
Women's swimming
Representing the Netherlands
European Championships
Bronze medal – third place	1981 Split	4×100 m freestyle

Monique Drost (born 8 October 1964) is a retired Dutch swimmer who won a bronze medal in the 4 × 100 m freestyle relay at the 1981 European Aquatics Championships. She also competed at the 1980 Summer Olympics in the 100 m freestyle.

Monique is not related to Olympic swimmers Frank Drost and Peter Drost. After retiring from competitive swimming she worked as a swimming coach.
