= Frank Drost =

Dutch swimmer (born 1963)

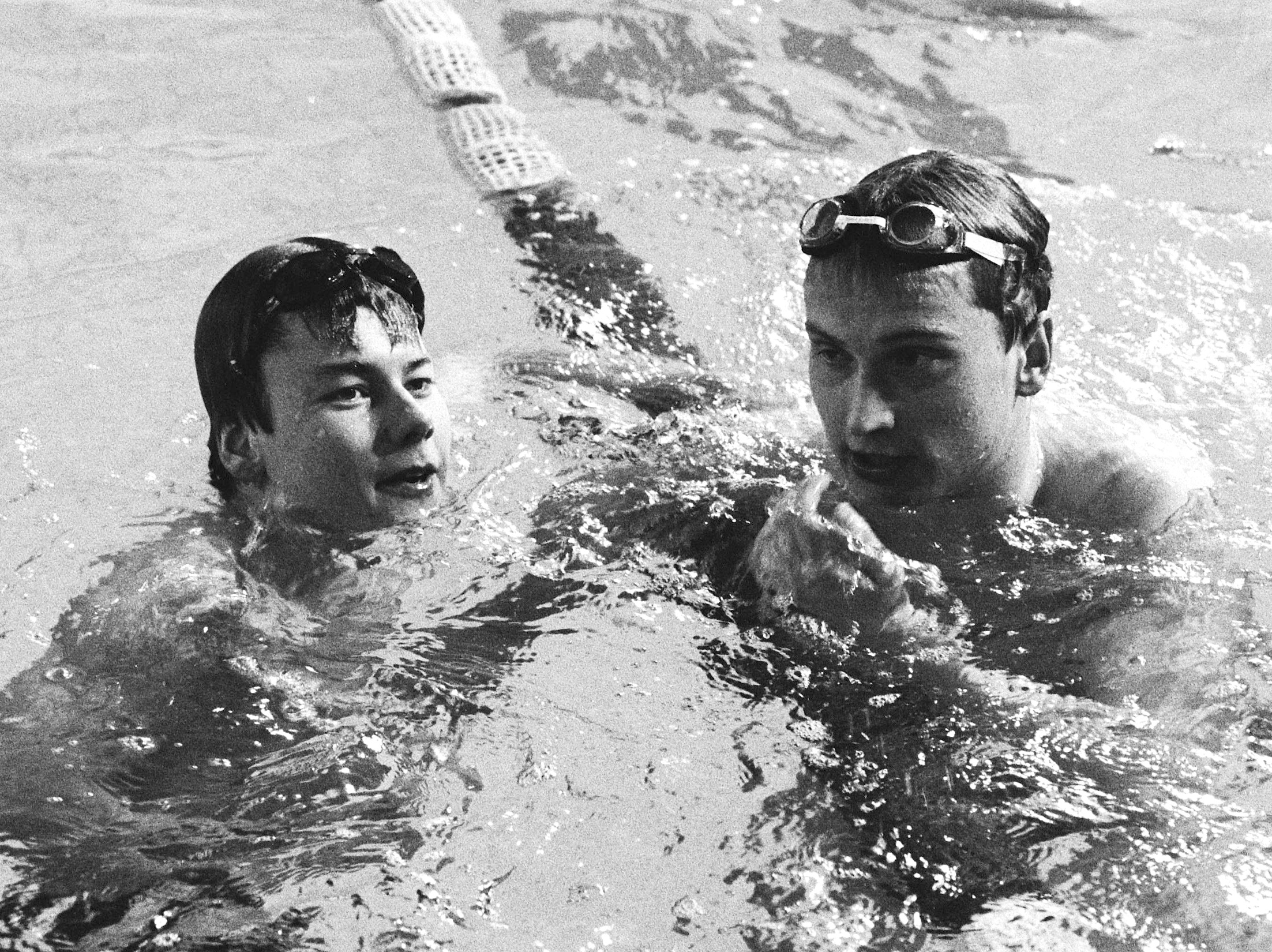
- Frank Drost (right) in 1982

Personal information
- Born: 22 March 1963 (age 63) Amersfoort, Utrecht, the Netherlands
- Height: 1.93 m (6 ft 4 in)
- Weight: 81 kg (179 lb)

Sport
- Sport: Swimming
- Club: AZ&PC, Amersfoort
Medal record
Men's Swimming
Representing the Netherlands
European Championships (LC)
Bronze medal – third place	1985 Sofia	200 m butterfly
Bronze medal – third place	1985 Sofia	4×200 m freestyle
Summer Universiade
Gold medal – first place	1987 Zagreb	200 m freestyle

Frank Willem Drost (born 22 March 1963) is a former freestyle and butterfly swimmer from the Netherlands who competed at the 1984 and 1988 Summer Olympics. His best individual Olympic result came in 1984, when he finished in sixth place (1:51.62) in the 200 m freestyle.

His elder brother Peter was also a swimmer. They are not related to Monique. Drost won two bronze medals at the 1985 European Championships in Sofia, Bulgaria. Nationally, he collected five titles in 1987 and 1988, in 100 m and 200 m butterfly and 200 m freestyle. Between 1982 and 1986 he set 15 records in 200–1500 m freestyle, 200 m butterfly and 4×100 m freestyle relay.
