= Gérard de Kort =

Dutch swimmer

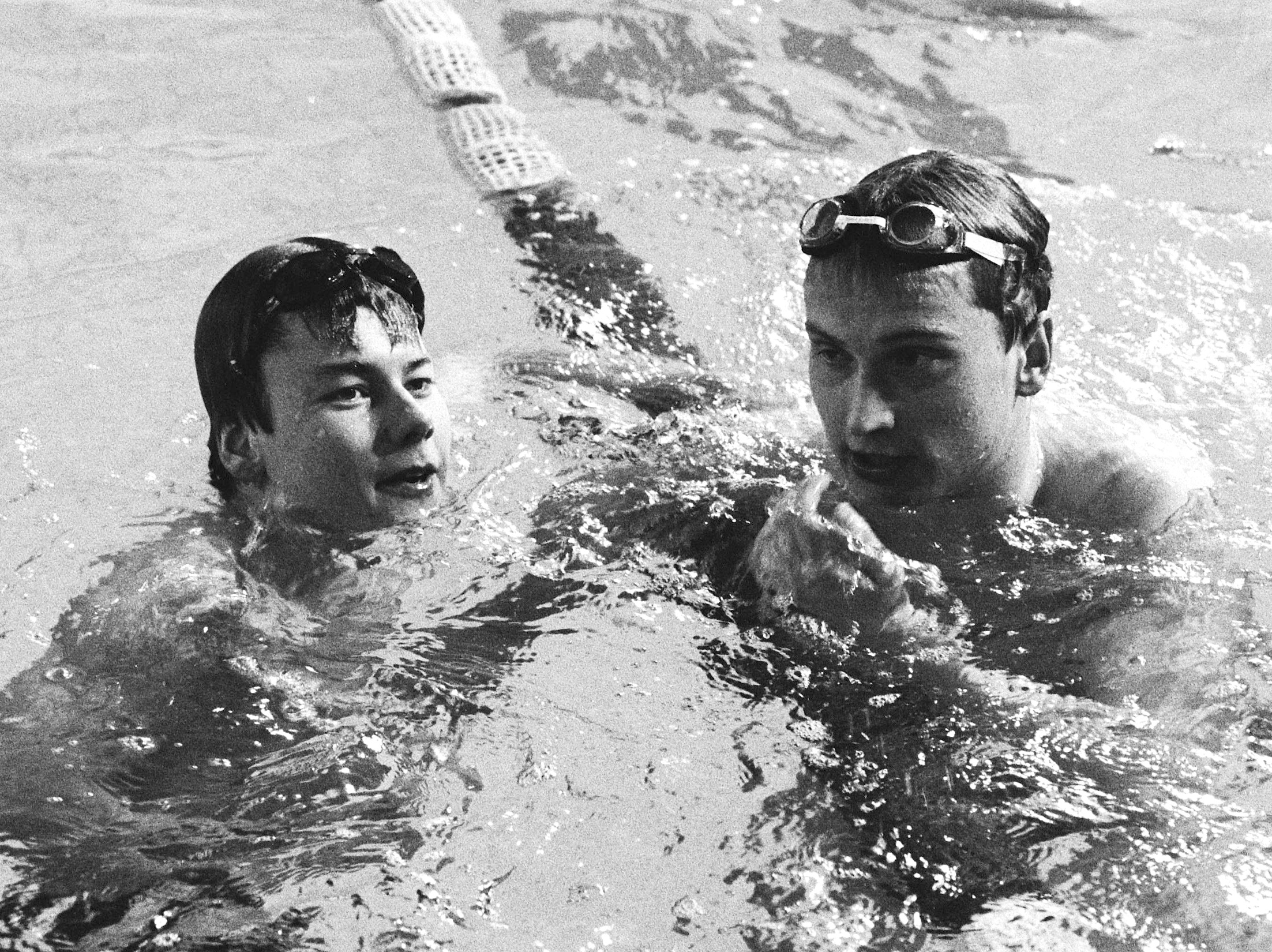
- Gérard de Kort (right) in 1982

Personal information
- Born: 11 September 1963 (age 62) Leiden, the Netherlands
- Height: 1.75 m (5 ft 9 in)
- Weight: 64 kg (141 lb)

Sport
- Sport: Swimming
- Club: HPC, Heemstede

Gérard Adrianus Pius de Kort (born 11 September 1963) is a retired butterfly swimmer from the Netherlands. He competed at the 1984 Olympics in the individual 100 m and 200 m events, but failed to reach the finals.
