= Edsard Schlingemann =

Dutch swimmer (1966–1990)

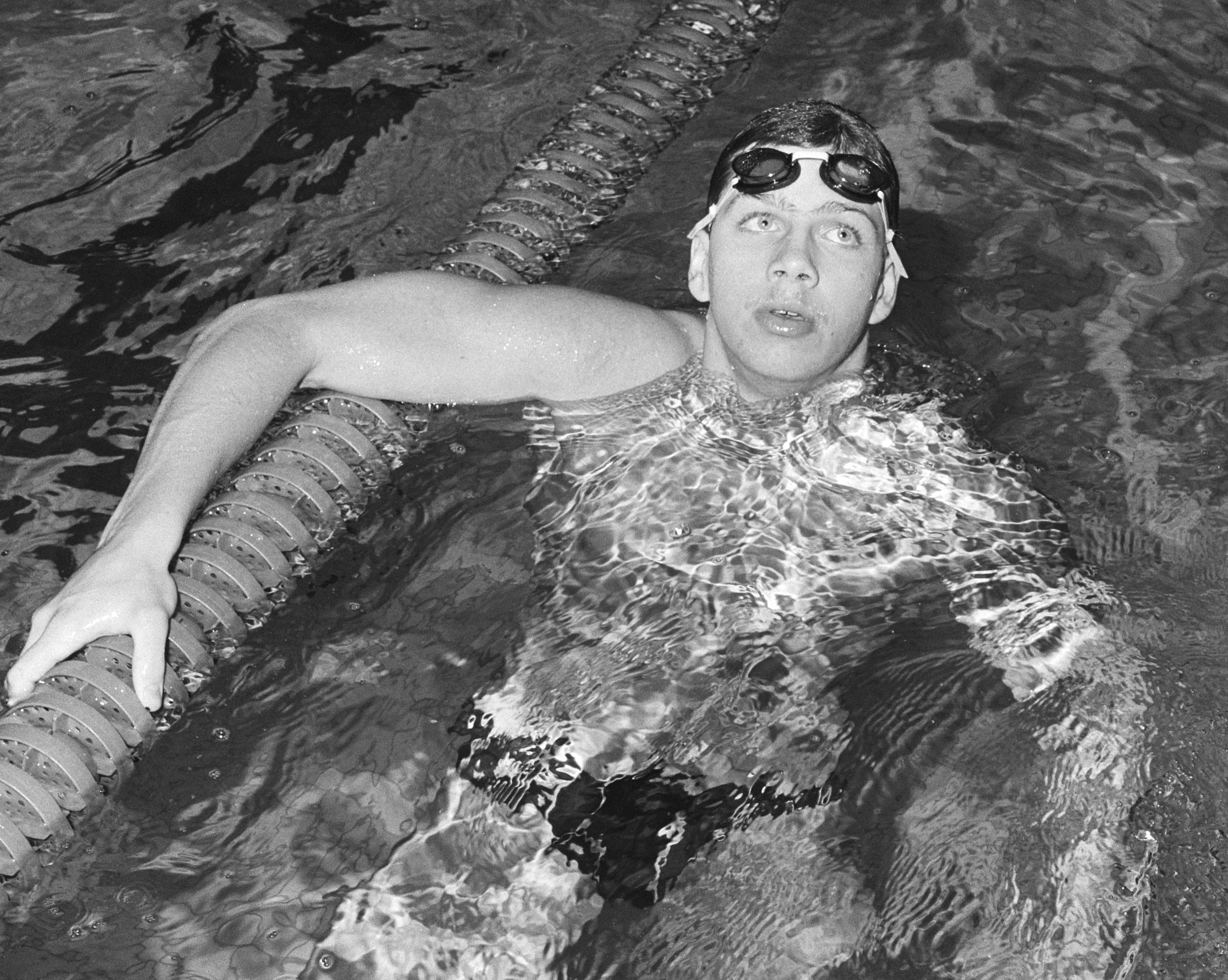
- Edsard Schlingemann in 1984

Personal information
- National team: Netherlands
- Born: 6 September 1966 Kitwe, Zambia
- Died: 8 May 1990 (aged 23) Epe, Netherlands
- Height: 1.87 m (6 ft 2 in)
- Weight: 80 kg (176 lb)

Sport
- Sport: Swimming
- Strokes: Freestyle, individual medley
- Club: AZ&PC, Amersfoort
Medal record
Men's Swimming
Representing the Netherlands
European Championships (LC)
Bronze medal – third place	1985 Sofia	4×200 m freestyle

Edsard Frederik Schlingemann (6 September 1966 – 8 May 1990) was a Dutch swimmer who competed in at the Olympic Games of 1984 in Los Angeles. He finished seventh in the 4×200 m freestyle relay and failed to reach the final of the 4×100 m freestyle relay. Schlingemann also missed the finals in his 100 m freestyle and 200 m individual medley races.

Schlingemann represented The Netherlands at the 1982 and 1986 World Championships and the European Championships of 1983 and 1985.

He died aged 23 in a car crash on his way to training.
