= Alette Pos =

Dutch field hockey player

Medal record

Women's field hockey

Representing the Netherlands

Olympic Games
Gold medal – first place	1984 Los Angeles	Team

Esther ("Alette") Pos (born March 30, 1962) is a former Dutch field hockey goalkeeper, who won the gold medal with the Dutch National Women's Team at the 1984 Summer Olympics. From 1982 to 1988 she played a total number of 28 international matches for Holland, mostly as a stand-in for first choice Det de Beus.
