= Lynda Cornet =

Dutch rower (born 1962)

Personal information
- Born: 26 January 1962 (age 64)
Medal record
Women's Rowing
Representing the Netherlands
Olympic Games
Bronze medal – third place	1984 Los Angeles	Eights

Lynda Ann Cornet (born 26 January 1962 in Leiden, South Holland) is a former international rower from the Netherlands, who won the bronze medal in the Women's Eights at the 1984 Summer Olympics in Los Angeles, California, alongside Marieke van Drogenbroek, Harriet van Ettekoven, Greet Hellemans, Nicolette Hellemans, Martha Laurijsen, Catharina Neelissen, Anne Quist, and Wiljon Vaandrager.
