= Harriet van Ettekoven =

Dutch rower (born 1961)

Personal information
- Born: 6 January 1961 (age 65) Zandvoort, North Holland, Netherlands

Sport
- Sport: Rowing
Medal record
Representing the Netherlands
Olympic Games
Bronze medal – third place	1984 Los Angeles	Eights
Summer Universiade
Bronze medal – third place	1987 Zagreb	Coxless pairs

Harriet van Ettekoven (born 6 January 1961) is a former international rower from the Netherlands, who won the bronze medal in the Women's Eights at the 1984 Summer Olympics in Los Angeles, California, alongside Marieke van Drogenbroek, Lynda Cornet, Greet Hellemans, Nicolette Hellemans, Martha Laurijsen, Catharina Neelissen, Anne Quist, and Wiljon Vaandrager. She also competed in the 1988 and 1992 Summer Olympics.
