= Martha Laurijsen =

Dutch rower (born 1954)

Personal information
- Born: 15 April 1954 (age 72)
Medal record
Women's Rowing
Representing the Netherlands
Olympic Games
Bronze medal – third place	1984 Los Angeles	Eights

Martha "Marty" Johanna Petronella Laurijsen (born 15 April 1954 in Utrecht) is a former rowing cox from the Netherlands. She won the bronze medal coxing the Women's Eights at the 1984 Summer Olympics in Los Angeles, California, alongside Marieke van Drogenbroek, Lynda Cornet, Greet Hellemans, Nicolette Hellemans, Harriet van Ettekoven, Catharina Neelissen, Anne Quist, and Wiljon Vaandrager.
