= Wiljon Vaandrager =

Dutch rower (born 1957)

Personal information
- Born: 27 August 1957 (age 68)
Medal record
Women's rowing
Representing the Netherlands
Olympic Games
Bronze medal – third place	1984 Los Angeles	Eights

Willemien Jonetta "Wiljon" Vaandrager (born 27 August 1957 in Brummen, Gelderland) is a former international rower from the Netherlands, who won the bronze medal in the Women's Eights at the 1984 Summer Olympics in Los Angeles, California, alongside Marieke van Drogenbroek, Lynda Cornet, Greet Hellemans, Nicolette Hellemans, Harriet van Ettekoven, Catharina Neelissen, Anne Quist, and Martha Laurijsen.
