= Gijs van Heumen =

Dutch field hockey coach

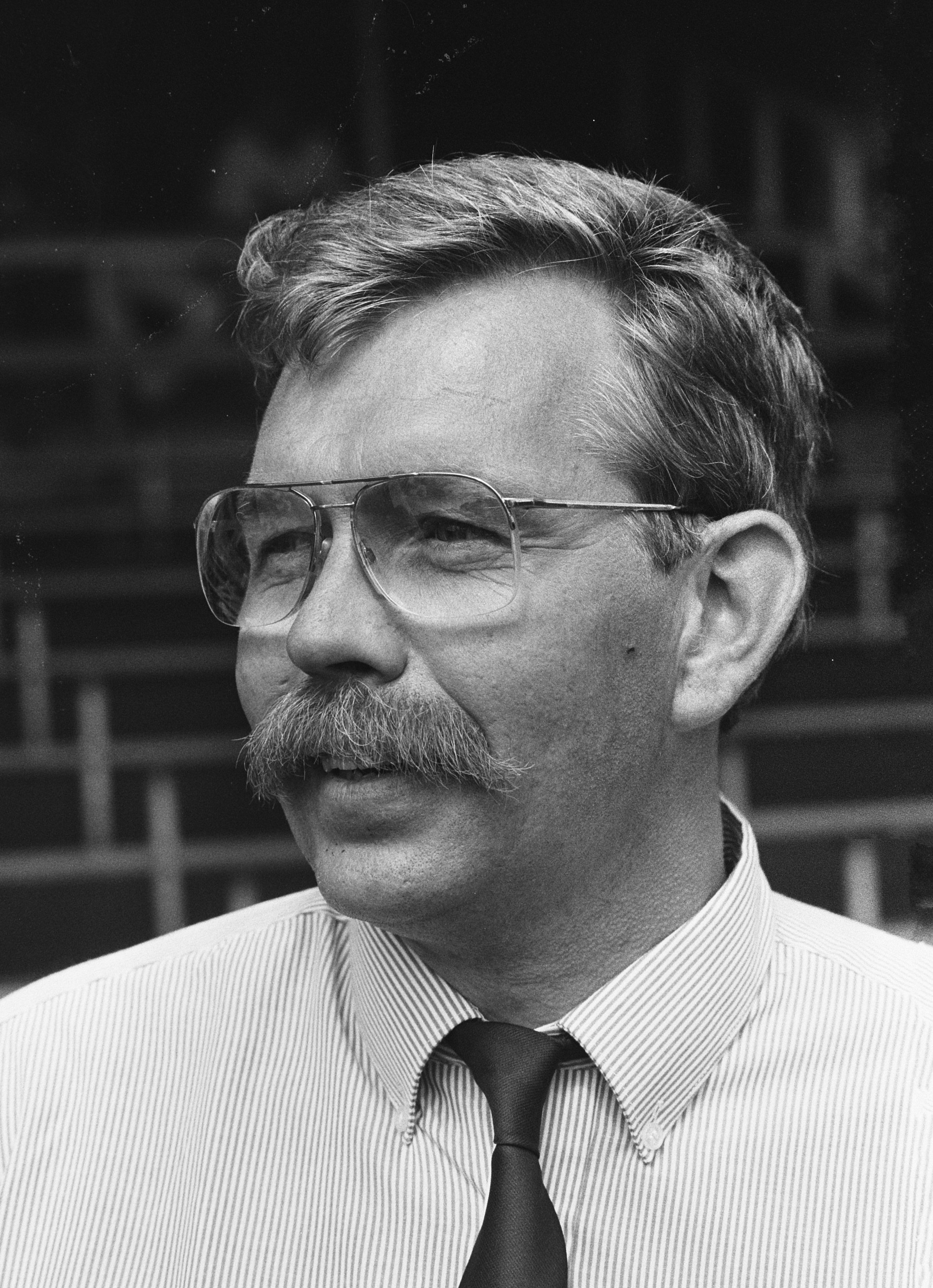
- Gijs van Heumen in 1986

Personal information
- Born: 23 July 1952 (age 73) 's-Hertogenbosch, the Netherlands

Sport
- Sport: Field hockey

Gijs van Heumen (born 23 July 1952) is a retired field hockey coach from the Netherlands. He was in charge of the Dutch National Women's Team from 1980 to 1989, bringing it to one Olympic (1984), two world (1983 and 1986) and two European titles (1984 and 1987); the 1980 Games were boycotted by the Netherlands, whereas in 1988 the women's team won bronze.

Van Heumen's father Wim coached the national men's field hockey team between 1975 and 1986. His innovations to Dutch hockey, such as using artificial grass and combining plays on grass in summer and indoors in winter, were followed by his son. Furthermore, Gijs intensified physical training of the team and almost doubled its daily training time.

After voluntarily stepping out as national coach, between 1993 and 1997 van Heumen worked as a technical director of the Koninklijke Nederlandse Hockey Bond. He later coached Oranje Zwart, HC 's-Hertogenbosch and HC Rotterdam (2004–2008).
