= René Klaassen =

Dutch field hockey player

Personal information
- Born: 4 March 1961 (age 65)
Medal record
Men's Field Hockey
Representing the Netherlands
Olympic Games
Bronze medal – third place	1988 Seoul	Team competition
World Cup
Gold medal – first place	1990 Lahore	Team competition

René Nico Hubertus Klaassen (born 4 March 1961 in Velp) is a former field hockey defender from the Netherlands, who participated in two Summer Olympics: in Los Angeles (1984) and in Seoul (1988).

He ended up in sixth place in California with the Dutch National Men's Team, and won the bronze medal in South Korea four years later, after defeating Australia (2-1) in the Bronze Medal Game. Klaassen earned a total number of 126 caps, scoring three goals, in the years 1984–1990. He was also on the side that won the world title in Lahore, Pakistan. After that tournament he retired from international competition.
