= Catharina Neelissen =

Dutch rower (born 1961)

Personal information
- Full name: Catharina Eline Maria Neelissen
- Nickname: "Catalien"
- Born: 4 November 1961 (age 64) Haarlem, North Holland
Medal record
Women's rowing
Representing the Netherlands
Olympic Games
Bronze medal – third place	1984 Los Angeles	Eights

Catharina Eline Maria "Catalien" Neelissen (born 4 November 1961 in Haarlem, North Holland) is a former international rower from the Netherlands, who won the bronze medal in the Women's Eights at the 1984 Summer Olympics in Los Angeles, California. Her teammates were Marieke van Drogenbroek, Lynda Cornet, Greet Hellemans, Nicolette Hellemans, Harriet van Ettekoven, Martha Laurijsen, Anne Quist, and Wiljon Vaandrager.
