= Wim van Heumen =

Dutch field hockey player

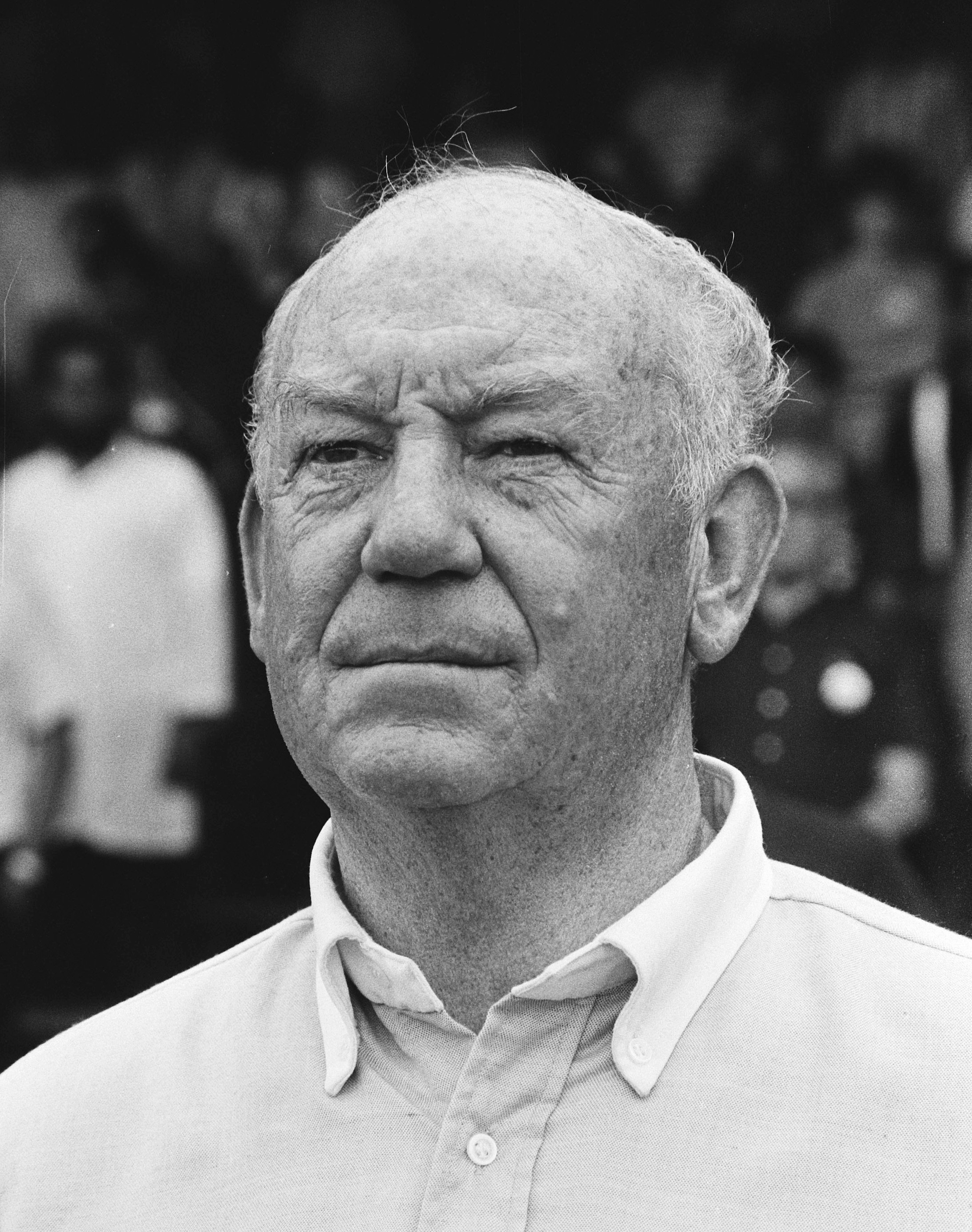
- Wim van Heumen in 1982

Personal information
- Born: 28 October 1928 Nijmegen, the Netherlands
- Died: 31 January 1992 (aged 63) 's-Hertogenbosch, the Netherlands

Sport
- Sport: Field hockey

Wilhelmus "Wim" Maria van Heumen (28 October 1928 – 31 January 1992) was a field hockey coach from the Netherlands, who was in charge of the Dutch National Men's Team from 1975 to 1986.

== Career ==
Van Heumen graduated in 1954 with a degree in physical education. Beginning in 1956 he taught this subject at the Academy of Physical Education in Tilburg. In 1966 he became a coach with the field hockey club of 's-Hertogenbosch and later a national coach with a first match played on 19 July 1975. He retired from this position in April 1986 after supervising 232 matches with 139 wins and 35 draws.

Van Heumen introduced new elements to Dutch hockey such as playing on artificial grass and combining summer training on grass with winter plays indoors.

== Politics ==
A member of the Catholic People's Party (KVP) and its successor the Christian Democratic Appeal (CDA) Van Heumen was a member of the municipal council of 's-Hertogenbosch from 1970 till his death in 1992. From 1990 he was also an alderman.

== Family ==
Van Heumen was born to Hendrikus Johannes van Heumen and Petronella Henkelman. On 9 February he married Martina Gijsberdina Theresia Vollebergh (born 1926). They had four sons and one daughter. One son, Gijs van Heumen (born 1952), became a prominent field hockey coach with the women's team in the 1980s.
