= Marieke van Drogenbroek =

Dutch rower (born 1964)

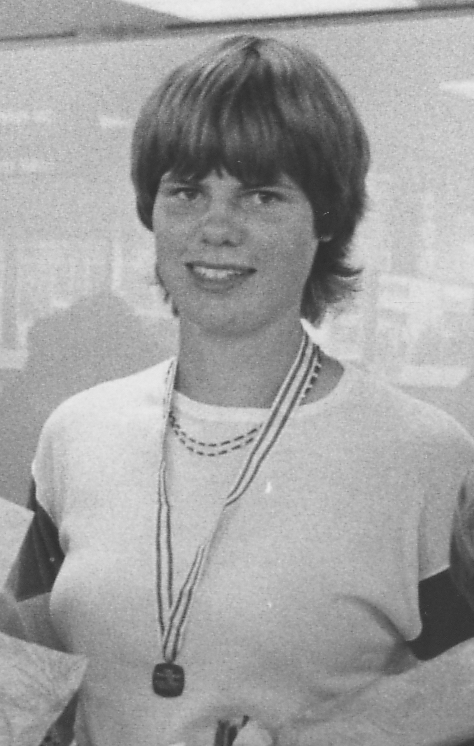

Personal information
- Born: 16 December 1964 (age 61)
Medal record
Women's Rowing
Representing the Netherlands
Olympic Games
Bronze medal – third place	1984 Los Angeles	Eights

Maria "Marieke" van Drogenbroek (born 16 December 1964 in Utrecht) is a former international rower from the Netherlands, who won the bronze medal in the Women's Eights at the 1984 Summer Olympics in Los Angeles, California, alongside Lynda Cornet, Harriet van Ettekoven, Greet Hellemans, Nicolette Hellemans, Martha Laurijsen, Catharina Neelissen, Anne Quist, and Wiljon Vaandrager.
