= Anne Quist =

Dutch rower

Medal record

Women's rowing

Representing the Netherlands

Olympic Games
Bronze medal – third place	1984 Los Angeles	Eight

Johanne "Anne-Marie" Marie Quist (born 26 December 1957 in Nijmegen, Gelderland) is a former international rower from the Netherlands, who won the bronze medal in the Women's Eights at the 1984 Summer Olympics in Los Angeles, California. Her teammates were Marieke van Drogenbroek, Lynda Cornet, Greet Hellemans, Nicolette Hellemans, Harriet van Ettekoven, Martha Laurijsen, Catharina Neelissen, and Wiljon Vaandrager.
