= Greet Hellemans =

Dutch rower (born 1959)

Personal information
- Born: 25 May 1959 (age 67) Groningen, Netherlands
Medal record
Women's rowing
Representing the Netherlands
Olympic Games
Silver medal – second place	1984 Los Angeles	Double sculls
Bronze medal – third place	1984 Los Angeles	Eights
Summer Universiade
Bronze medal – third place	1987 Zagreb	Coxless pairs

Greta "Greet" Mettina Hellemans (born 25 May 1959) is a former rower from the Netherlands, who won the silver medal in the Women's Double Sculls at the 1984 Summer Olympics in Los Angeles, California, partnering with her sister Nicolette.

At the same tournament Hellemans at her second Olympic appearance was also a member of the bronze winning team in the Women's Eights, alongside Marieke van Drogenbroek, Lynda Cornet, Harriet van Ettekoven, Nicolette Hellemans, Martha Laurijsen, Catharina Neelissen, Anne Quist, and Wiljon Vaandrager.
