= Nicolette Hellemans =

Dutch rower (born 1961)

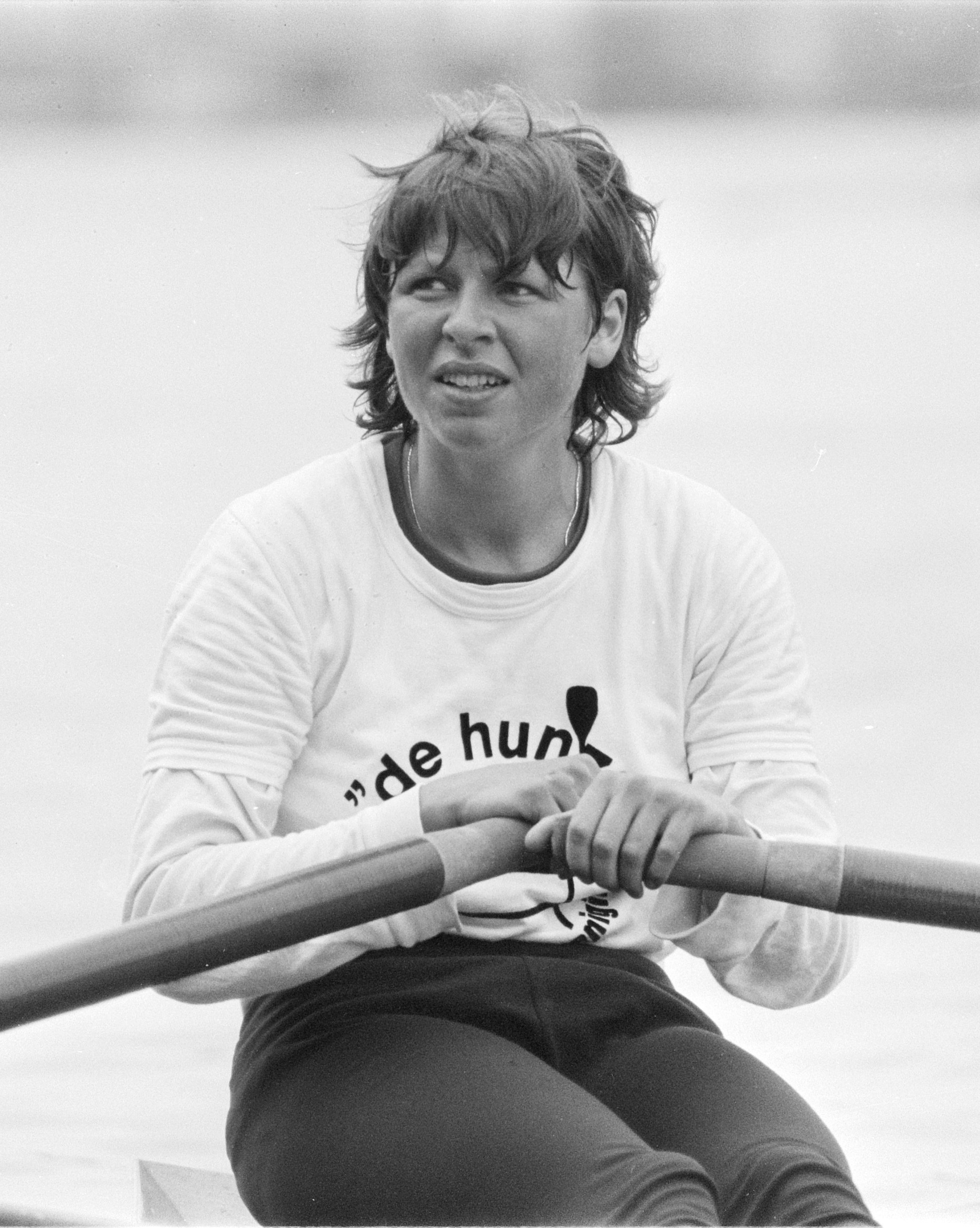
- Hellemans in 1984

Personal information
- Born: 30 November 1961 (age 64) Groningen, the Netherlands
- Height: 1.69 m (5 ft 7 in)
- Weight: 58 kg (128 lb)

Sport
- Sport: Rowing
- Club: De Hunze, Groningen
Medal record
Representing the Netherlands
Olympic Games
Silver medal – second place	1984 Los Angeles	Double sculls
Bronze medal – third place	1984 Los Angeles	Eight

Nicolette Hellemans (born 30 November 1961) is a former international rower from the Netherlands, who won the silver medal in the women's double sculls at the 1984 Summer Olympics, partnering with her elder sister Greet. At the same Olympics she also won a bronze medal in the women's eight, alongside Marieke van Drogenbroek, Lynda Cornet, Harriet van Ettekoven, Greet Hellemans, Martha Laurijsen, Catharina Neelissen, Anne Quist and Wiljon Vaandrager.
