= Pakistan national field hockey team results (1980–1989) =

These are all the international matches played by Pakistan national field hockey from 1980 to 1989.

== Competitive record overview ==
- Win Draw Loss

Year	Competition	Location(s)	Venue(s)	GP	W	D	L	GF	GA	Result
1980	1980 Hockey Champions Trophy	(Pakistan)	Karachi	6	5	1	0	32	8	1st
1980	Kuala Lumpur Four Nations	(Malaysia)	Kuala Lumpur	3	3	0	0	11	3	1st
1980	Test series vs Malaysia	(Malaysia)	Johor Bahru, Ipoh, Penang	3	3	0	0	10	2	Winners
1980	Tour of East Africa	(Kenya) (Zimbabwe)	Nairobi, Mombasa, Salisbury	11	11	0	0	41	5	-
1981	Test match vs Kenya	(Pakistan)	Lahore	1	0	1	0	1	1	-
1981	1981 Hockey Champions Trophy	(Pakistan)	Karachi	5	2	1	2	13	11	4th
1981	Singapore Jubilee Hockey Cup	(Singapore)	Singapore	3	3	0	0	7	2	1st
1981	Puma Masters Four Nations	(West Germany)	Frankfurt	3	0	2	1	6	7	3rd
1981	Peugeot Four Nations Trophy	(Netherlands)	Amsterdam	3	2	0	1	9	7	2nd
1981	Poznań Three Nations	(Poland)	Poznań	2	2	0	0	9	1	1st
1981	Test series vs India	(India) (Pakistan)	Bombay, Calcutta Lahore, Karachi	4	2	1	1	14	11	Winners
1981	Test match vs Netherlands	(Pakistan)	Lahore	1	1	0	0	3	2	-
1982	1982 FIH Hockey World Cup	(India)	Bombay	7	7	0	0	38	12	1st
1982	1982 Hockey Asia Cup	(Pakistan)	Karachi	6	6	0	0	51	1	1st
1982	Test series vs India	(United Arab Emirates)	Dubai	2	2	0	0	8	2	Winners
1982	1982 Hockey Champions Trophy	(Netherlands)	Amstelveen	5	2	1	2	21	19	4th
1982	Test series vs Japan	(Japan)	Tokyo	2	2	0	0	11	3	Winners
1982	1982 Asian Games	(India)	New Delhi	5	5	0	9	37	2	1st
1982	Esanda Hockey Cup Melbourne	(Australia)	Melbourne	6	3	0	3	23	12	6th
1983	1983 Sultan Azlan Shah Cup	(Malaysia)	Kuala Lumpur	5	2	1	2	9	8	2nd
1983	1983 Hockey Champions Trophy	(Pakistan)	Karachi	5	3	0	2	10	6	2nd
1983	Test series vs Australia	(United Arab Emirates)	Dubai	2	1	0	1	6	6	Drawn
1983	Hong Kong Jubilee Ten Nations	(Hong Kong)	Hong Kong	6	5	0	1	24	8	2nd
1984	Test match vs Kenya	(Pakistan)	TBD	1	0	1	0	2	2	-
1984	Test series vs India	(Kuwait) (Qatar)	Kuwait City, Doha	3	0	1	2	1	3	Lost
1984	Test series vs Soviet Union	(Pakistan)	Lahore, Islamabad	2	2	0	0	6	1	Winners
1984	Tour of Europe	(France) (Netherlands) (Belgium) (Spain)	Paris, Lille, Amstelveen, Brussels, Madrid	7	5	2	0	17	7	-
1984	Test series vs Canada	(Canada)	Vancouver	2	1	1	0	5	2	Winners
1984	1984 Summer Olympics	(United States)	Los Angeles	7	4	3	0	19	8	1st
1984	FIH Anniversary Memorial Match	(Belgium)	Brussels	1	0	0	1	2	4	-
1984	1984 Hockey Champions Trophy	(Pakistan)	Karachi	5	4	0	1	14	8	2nd
1985	1985 Hockey Asia Cup	(Bangladesh)	Dhaka	6	6	0	0	31	2	1st
1985	Test matches vs France & Belgium	(Pakistan)	TBD	3	3	0	0	7	2	Winners
1985	1985 Hockey Champions Trophy	(Australia)	Perth	5	2	1	2	10	10	4th
1985	1985 Sultan Azlah Shah Cup	(Malaysia)	Ipoh	4	2	1	1	10	4	3rd
1986	Four Nations Dubai	(United Arab Emirates)	Dubai	3	1	1	1	5	6	3rd
1986	Four Nations Kuwait	(Kuwait)	Kuwait City	3	1	1	1	6	6	2nd
1986	Test series vs India	(India) (Pakistan)	Kolkata, Kolhapur, Hyderabad Sialkot, Sargodha, Islamabad, Karachi	7	2	2	3	16	19	Lost
1986	1986 Hockey Champions Trophy	(Pakistan)	Karachi	5	1	3	1	7	6	3rd
1986	Test series vs Japan	(Pakistan)	TBD	2	2	0	0	15	2	Winners
1986	Tour of Europe	(France) (Spain) (Netherlands) (West Germany)	Paris, Santander, Amstelveen, Tilburg, Assen, Heidenheim, Heidelberg	9	5	1	3	11	6	-
1986	Four Nations Leningrad	(Soviet Union)	Leningrad	3	2	0	1	6	3	2nd
1986	1986 Asian Games	(South Korea)	Seongnam	5	3	0	2	24	5	2nd
1986	1986 FIH Hockey World Cup	(England)	London	7	2	0	5	12	17	11th
1987	1987 Sultan Azlan Shah Cup	(Malaysia)	Kuala Lumpur	4	3	0	1	15	10	2nd
1987	Test match vs Poland	(Pakistan)	TBD	1	1	0	0	2	1	-
1987	1987 Hockey Champions Trophy	(Netherlands)	Amstelveen	7	1	0	6	9	16	7th
1987	Lada International Hockey Classics	(England)	London	3	2	1	0	6	4	2nd
1987	Test series vs South Korea	(Pakistan)	Karachi	2	2	0	0	11	1	Winners
1987	Test series vs Netherlands	(Pakistan)	Karachi, Quetta, Lahore, Islamabad	5	3	0	2	9	9	Winners
1988	Indira Gandhi Gold Cup 1988	(India)	Lucknow	5	5	0	0	17	1	1st
1988	1988 Hockey Champions Trophy	(Pakistan)	Lahore	5	2	3	0	9	3	2nd
1988	Perak International Hockey	(Malaysia)	Ipoh	4	3	0	1	15	2	3rd
1988	Marshalls International Hockey Cup	(Kenya)	Nairobi	5	3	0	2	13	9	2nd
1988	Nairobi Three Nations	(Kenya)	Nairobi	2	2	0	0	10	2	1st
1988	Test series vs Zimbabwe	(Zimbabwe)	Harare	4	4	0	0	26	2	Winners
1988	Test series vs India	(India) (Pakistan)	New Delhi, Lucknow, Gwalior Lahore, Quetta, Karachi	6	2	2	2	10	10	Drawn
1988	1988 Summer Olympics	(South Korea)	Seoul	7	5	0	2	18	9	5th
1989	Indira Gandhi Gold Cup 1989	(India)	Lucknow	5	4	0	1	13	4	1st
1989	1989 Hockey Champions Trophy	(West Germany)	West Berlin	5	2	0	3	9	12	4th
1989	Test series vs England	(Pakistan)	Lahore	2	2	0	0	9	2	Winners
1989	Test series vs Japan	(Pakistan)	TBD	2	2	0	0	14	1	Winners
1989	1989 Hockey Asia Cup	(India)	New Delhi	4	4	0	0	11	4	1st

== Results ==
=== 1980 ===
3 January 1980

Pakistan	7 - 1	India
Hanif 10', 38', 55'; Manzoor Sr. 28'; Abbas 40', 59'; Kaleemullah 63'	Report	Davinder 24'

Karachi, Pakistan

Event: 1980 Hockey Champions Trophy
Round-robin first match

4 January 1980

Pakistan	5 - 1	Spain
Manzoor Sr. 6'; Rasool 17'; Samiullah 25', 62'; Kaleemullah 56'	Report	Amat 67'

Karachi, Pakistan

Event: 1980 Hockey Champions Trophy
Round-robin second match

6 January 1980

Pakistan	7 - 1	Australia
Samiullah 6', 45', 61'; Munawar 16', 35+'; Manzoor Sr. 63'; Hanif 67'	Report	Walsh 47'

Karachi, Pakistan

Event: 1980 Hockey Champions Trophy
Round-robin third match

8 January 1980

Pakistan	4 - 2	West Germany
Kaleemullah 27', 42'; A. Khan 29'; Manzoor Sr. 56'	Report	Blöcher 11'; Strödter 63'

Karachi, Pakistan

Event: 1980 Hockey Champions Trophy
Round-robin fourth match

9 January 1980

Pakistan	6 - 1	Great Britain
Abbas 9', 45'; Kaleemullah 23'; Manzoor Sr. 42'	Report	Cattrall 7'

Karachi, Pakistan

Event: 1980 Hockey Champions Trophy
Round-robin fifth match

11 January 1980

Pakistan	3 - 2	Netherlands
Hanif 10'; Manzoor Sr. 40'; Abbas 67'	Report	Litjens 30', 41'

Karachi, Pakistan

Event: 1980 Hockey Champions Trophy
Round-robin sixth match

11 April 1980

Pakistan	3 - 1	India
Manzoor Jr. 11'; Davinder 15(o.g)' Kaleemullah 31'	Report	Davinder 27'

Kuala Lumpur, Malaysia

Event: Kuala Lumpur Four Nations 1980
Round-robin first match

12 April 1980

Malaysia	1 - 5	Pakistan
Seong 38'	Report	Manzoor Sr. 37', 47', 57'; Samiullah 46'; Asghar 64'

Kuala Lumpur, Malaysia

Event: Kuala Lumpur Four Nations 1980
Round-robin second match

13 April 1980

Pakistan	3 - 1	Australia
Manzoor Sr. 9'; Manzoor Jr. 21'; Kaleemullah 58'	Report	Bell 31'

Kuala Lumpur, Malaysia

Event: Kuala Lumpur Four Nations 1980
Round-robin third match

16 April 1980

Malaysia	0 - 4	Pakistan
	Report	Iqbal 12'; Muhammad 15'; Seong 32(o.g)' Manzoor Sr. 62'

Johor Bahru, Malaysia

Event: Test series
First test match

19 April 1980

Malaysia	1 - 3	Pakistan
Rajan 62'	Report	Samiullah 13'; Manzoor Jr. 38'; Abbas 70'

Ipoh, Malaysia

Event: Test series
Second test match

20 April 1980

Malaysia	1 - 3	Pakistan
Maria 62'	Report	Manzoor Sr. 13'; Abbas 15'; Manzoor Jr. 56'

Penang, Malaysia

Event: Test series
Third test match

TBD

Zimbabwe	-/-	Pakistan
	[Record absent]

TBD, Zimbabwe

Event: Test series
First test match

2 June 1980

Zimbabwe	1 - 5	Pakistan
	Report

Salisbury, Zimbabwe

Event: Test series
Second test match

TBD

Zimbabwe	-/-	Pakistan
	[Record absent]

TBD, Zimbabwe

Event: Test series
Third test match

TBD

Zimbabwe	-/-	Pakistan
	[Record absent]

TBD, Zimbabwe

Event: Test series
Fourth test match

TBD

Zimbabwe	-/-	Pakistan
	[Record absent]

TBD, Zimbabwe

Event: Test series
Fifth test match

TBD

Kenya	-/-	Pakistan
	[Record absent]

TBD, Kenya

Event: Test series
Second test match

TBD

Kenya	-/-	Pakistan
	[Record absent]

TBD, Kenya

Event: Test series
Third test match

TBD

Kenya	-/-	Pakistan
	[Record absent]

TBD, Kenya

Event: Test series
Fourth test match

22 June 1980

Kenya	0 - 2	Pakistan
	Report

Mombasa, Kenya

Event: Test series
Fourth test match

28 June 1980

Kenya	0 - 4	Pakistan
	Report

Nairobi, Kenya

Test series
Fifth test match

30 June 1980

Kenya	0 - 5	Pakistan
	Report

Nairobi, Kenya

Event: Test series
Sixth test match

=== 1981 ===
2 January 1981

Pakistan	1 - 1	Kenya
	Report

Lahore, Pakistan

Event: Test match

9 January 1981

Pakistan	5 - 2	Spain
	Report

Karachi, Pakistan

Event: 1981 Hockey Champions Trophy
Round-robin first match

11 January 1981

Netherlands	1 - 0	Pakistan
Litjens 15'	Report

Karachi, Pakistan

Event: 1981 Hockey Champions Trophy
Round-robin second match

13 January 1981

Pakistan	3 - 4	Australia
	Report

Karachi, Pakistan

Event: 1981 Hockey Champions Trophy
Round-robin third match

14 January 1981

Pakistan	3 - 2	England
	Report

Karachi, Pakistan

Event: 1981 Hockey Champions Trophy
Round-robin fourth match

16 January 1981

Pakistan	2 - 2	West Germany
	Report

Karachi, Pakistan

Event: 1981 Hockey Champions Trophy
Round-robin fifth match

15 April 1981

Pakistan	1 - 0	Malaysia
Saeed 29'	Report

Singapore, Singapore

Event: Singapore Jubilee Quadrangular Hockey Cup 1981
Round-robin first match

16 April 1981

Pakistan	3 - 1	Singapore
Kaleemullah 32'; Hanif 35'; Manzoor Sr. 50'	Report	Ali 63'

Singapore, Singapore

Event: Singapore Jubilee Quadrangular Hockey Cup 1981
Round-robin second match

16 April 1981

New Zealand	1 - 3	Pakistan
Ramesh 64'	Report	Manzoor Sr. 40'; Tahir 60'; Saeed 67'

Singapore, Singapore

Event: Singapore Jubilee Quadrangular Hockey Cup 1981
Round-robin third match

15 June 1981

Netherlands	1 - 1	Pakistan
Bouwman 28'	Report	Hanif 61'

Frankfurt, West Germany

Event: Puma Masters Four Nations Hockey 1981
Round-robin first match

16 June 1981

Australia	3 - 3	Pakistan
	Report

Frankfurt, West Germany

Event: Puma Masters Four Nations Hockey 1981
Round-robin second match

17 June 1981

Pakistan	2 - 3	West Germany
	Report

Frankfurt, West Germany

Event: Puma Masters Four Nations Hockey 1981
Round-robin third match

19 June 1981

Pakistan	2 - 1	West Germany
	Report

Amsterdam, Netherlands

Event: Peugeot Four Nations Hockey Trophy 1981
Round-robin first match

20 June 1981

Pakistan	2 - 3	Australia
	Report

Amsterdam, Netherlands

Event: Peugeot Four Nations Hockey Trophy 1981
Round-robin second match

21 June 1981

Netherlands	3 - 5	Pakistan
van 't Hek 11', 34', FG'	Report	Manzoor Sr. 19', 58'; Kaleemullah 31'; Rashid 44'; Saeed 70'

Amsterdam, Netherlands

Event: Peugeot Four Nations Hockey Trophy 1981
Round-robin third match

TBD

Poland	-/-	Pakistan
	[Record absent]

Poznań, Poland

Event:Three Nations Poznań 1981
Round-robin first match

TBD

Pakistan	-/-	Soviet Union
	[Record absent]

Poznań, Poland

Event:Three Nations Poznań 1981
Round-robin second match

21 November 1981

India	3 - 5	Pakistan
	Report

Bombay, India

Test series
First test match

24 November 1981

India	4 - 3	Pakistan
	Report

Calcutta, India

Test series
Second test match

27 November 1981

Pakistan	2 - 2	India
Sardar 20'; Saeed 56'	Report	Gurmail 12'; Rajinder Jr. 60'

Lahore, Pakistan

Test series
Third test match

28 November 1981

Pakistan	3 - 2	Netherlands
Manzoor Sr. 50', 55'; Sherwani 63'	Report	Bouwman 15'; Jenniskens 40'

Lahore, Pakistan

Event: Test match

30 November 1981

Pakistan	4 - 2	India
	Report

Karachi, Pakistan

Test series
Fourth test match

30 December 1981

Pakistan	6 - 1	Argentina
Sardar 14'; Kaleemullah 35'; Manzoor Sr. 37'; Saeed 48'; Rashid 66'; Sherwani 70'	Report	Mascheroni 25'

Bombay, India

Event: 1982 FIH Hockey World Cup
Pool match

=== 1982 ===
1 January 1982

Spain	1 - 4	Pakistan
Roca 68'	Report	Kalemeullah 13', 55'; Manzoor Sr. 34'; Sardar 62'

Bombay, India

Event: 1982 FIH Hockey World Cup
Pool match

2 January 1982

Pakistan	12 - 3	New Zealand
Samiullah 11'; Manzoor Sr. 12', 28', 69'; Hanif 13', 33', 35'; Kaleemullah 26'; Sardar 41', 51', 60', 64'	Report	Daji 20'; Parkin 35', 58'

Bombay, India

Event: 1982 FIH Hockey World Cup
Pool match

5 January 1982

West Germany	3 - 5	Pakistan
Peter 41', 47', 61'	Report	Kaleemullah 32'; Samiullah 34', 70'; Manzoor Jr. 43'; Sardar 60'

Bombay, India

Event: 1982 FIH Hockey World Cup
Pool match

7 January 1982

Pakistan	4 - 1	Poland
Samiullah 17'; Kaleemullah 41'; Sardar 43'; Ahmed 57'	Report	Kruś 22'

Bombay, India

Event: 1982 FIH Hockey World Cup
Pool match

10 January 1982

Pakistan	4 - 2	Netherlands
Hanif 23'; Kaleemullah 29'; Sardar 32'; Manzoor Sr. 59'	Report	Litjens 27', 46'

Bombay, India

Event: 1982 FIH Hockey World Cup
Semifinal

12 January 1982

Pakistan	3 - 1	West Germany
Sardar 25'; Manzoor Jr. 26'; Kaleemullah 40'	Report	Dopp 5'

Bombay, India

Event: 1982 FIH Hockey World Cup
Final

13 March 1982

Pakistan	14 - 0	Sri Lanka
	Report

Karachi, Pakistan

Event: 1982 Hockey Asia Cup
Round-robin first match

14 March 1982

Pakistan	10 - 1	China
	Report

Karachi, Pakistan

Event: 1982 Hockey Asia Cup
Round-robin second match

15 March 1982

Pakistan	7 - 0	Singapore
	Report

Karachi, Pakistan

Event: 1982 Hockey Asia Cup
Round-robin third match

17 March 1982

Pakistan	7 - 0	Malaysia
Sardar 22', 33', 56'; Hanif 37'; Manzoor Jr. 41'; Kaleemullah 45', 51'	Report

Karachi, Pakistan

Event: 1982 Hockey Asia Cup
Round-robin fourth match

18 March 1982

Pakistan	9 - 0	Bangladesh
Zia 2'; Sardar 14'; Hanif 29', 44', 57'; Ishtiaq 33'; Manzoor Sr. 49'; Samiullah 60'; Saeed 64'	Report

Karachi, Pakistan

Event: 1982 Hockey Asia Cup
Round-robin fifth match

20 March 1982

Pakistan	4 - 0	India
Zia 25', 40'; Kaleemullah 49'; Sardar 69'	Report

Karachi, Pakistan

Event: 1982 Hockey Asia Cup
Round-robin sixth match

26 May 1982

Pakistan	5 - 1	India
	Report

Dubai, United Arab Emirates

Event: Test series
First test match

28 May 1982

Pakistan	3 - 1	India
	Report

Dubai, United Arab Emirates

Event: Test series
Second test match

6 June 1982

Pakistan	6 - 1	West Germany
Hanif 17', 28'; Ishtiaq 35'; Kaleemullah 57', 68'; Sardar 66'	Report	Wistuba 35'

Amstelveen, Netherlands

Event: 1982 Hockey Champions Trophy
Round-robin first match

7 June 1982

Pakistan	5 - 2	Soviet Union
Ahmed 28'; Sardar 29'; Samiullah 35'; Kaleemullah 53'; Hanif 59'	Report	Pleshakov 25'; Goncharov 60'

Amstelveen, Netherlands

Event: 1982 Hockey Champions Trophy
Round-robin second match

9 June 1982

Pakistan	4 - 4	Australia
Manzoor Sr. 8', 27'; Hanif 19'; Sardar 52'	Report	Haselhurst 10'; Davies 13', 68'; Irvine 63'

Amstelveen, Netherlands

Event: 1982 Hockey Champions Trophy
Round-robin third match

12 June 1982

Pakistan	4 - 5	India
Saeed 10'; Zia 12'; Sardar 16', 53'	Report	Rajinder Jr. 25', 30', 46'; Gurmail 58'; Surinder 59'

Amstelveen, Netherlands

Event: 1982 Hockey Champions Trophy
Round-robin fourth match

13 June 1982

Netherlands	7 - 2	Pakistan
Kruize 4', 14', 39', 56', 61'; Van 't Hek 11'; Bouwman 26'	Report	Sardar 33'; Manzoor Jr. 69'

Amstelveen, Netherlands

Event: 1982 Hockey Champions Trophy
Round-robin fifth match

23 July 1982

Japan	2 - 6	Pakistan
	[Report]

Tokyo, Japan

Event: Test series
First test match

25 July 1982

Japan	1 - 5	Pakistan
	Report

Tokyo, Japan

Event: Test series
Second test match

21 November 1982

Pakistan	6 - 0	China
	Report

New Delhi, India

Event: 1982 Asian Games
Pool match

22 November 1982

Pakistan	10 - 0	South Korea
	Report

New Delhi, India

Event: 1982 Asian Games
Pool match

24 November 1982

Japan	1 - 12	Pakistan
	Report

New Delhi, India

Event: 1982 Asian Games
Pool match

29 November 1982

Pakistan	2 - 0	Malaysia
	Report

New Delhi, India

Event: 1982 Asian Games
Semifinal

1 December 1982

India	1 - 7	Pakistan
	Report

New Delhi, India

Event: 1982 Asian Games
Final

11 December 1982

Pakistan	1 - 2	India
Manzoor Jr. 52'	Report	Ali 25'; Iqbal 55'

Melbourne, Australia

Event: Esanda Hockey Cup Melbourne 1982
Pool match

13 December 1982

Malaysia	0 - 5	Pakistan
	Report	Manzoor Jr. 13', 63'; Saeed 44', 55'; Kaleemullah 56'

Melbourne, Australia

Event: Esanda Hockey Cup Melbourne 1982
Pool match

14 December 1982

Pakistan	10 - 0	China
Kaleemullah 18', 47'; Mushtaq 19', 41', 59', 63'; Manzoor Jr. 27', 61'; Saeed 55', 68'	Report

Melbourne, Australia

Event: Esanda Hockey Cup Melbourne 1982
Pool match

16 December 1982

Netherlands	6 - 3	Pakistan
Bouwman 10', 24', 39', 48'; Grimbergen 42'; Schaeffers 63'	Report	Manzoor Jr. 8'; Manzoor Sr. 36', 65'

Melbourne, Australia

Event: Esanda Hockey Cup Melbourne 1982
Pool match

17 December 1982

Pakistan	2 - 1	England
	Report

Melbourne, Australia

Event: Esanda Hockey Cup Melbourne 1982
Crossover

19 December 1982

West Germany	3 - 2	Pakistan
Blöcher 10', 44'; Peter 42'	Report	Ahmed 22'; Klaeemullah 56'

Melbourne, Australia

Event: Esanda Hockey Cup Melbourne 1982
Fifth and sixth place

=== 1983 ===
21 August 1983

India	1 - 1	Pakistan
	Report

Kuala Lumpur, Malaysia

Event: 1983 Sultan Azlan Shah Cup
Pool match

22 August 1983

Pakistan	2 - 0	Malaysia
	Report

Kuala Lumpur, Malaysia

Event: 1983 Sultan Azlan Shah Cup
Pool match

24 August 1983

New Zealand	2 - 4	Pakistan
	Report

Kuala Lumpur, Malaysia

Event: 1983 Sultan Azlan Shah Cup
Pool match

27 August 1983

Pakistan	2 - 4	Australia
	Report

Kuala Lumpur, Malaysia

Event: 1983 Sultan Azlan Shah Cup
Pool match

28 August 1983

Australia	1 - 0	Pakistan
Walsh 18'	Report

Kuala Lumpur, Malaysia

Event: 1983 Sultan Azlan Shah Cup
Final

28 October 1983

Pakistan	3 - 0	New Zealand
	Report

Karachi, Pakistan

Event: 1983 Hockey Champions Trophy
Round-robin first match

30 October 1983

Pakistan	2 - 0	India
	Report

Karachi, Pakistan

Event: 1983 Hockey Champions Trophy
Round-robin second match

1 November 1983

Pakistan	0 - 2	Australia
	Report	Walsh 61', 64'

Karachi, Pakistan

Event: 1983 Hockey Champions Trophy
Round-robin third match

2 November 1983

West Germany	1 - 3	Pakistan
	Report

Karachi, Pakistan

Event: 1983 Hockey Champions Trophy
Round-robin fourth match

4 November 1983

Pakistan	2 - 3	Netherlands
Dar 1', 9'	Report	Bouwman 15', 16'; Doyer 61'

Karachi, Pakistan

Event: 1983 Hockey Champions Trophy
Round-robin fifth match

10 November 1983

Pakistan	2 - 3	Australia
	Report

Dubai, United Arab Emirates

Event: Test series
First test match

11 November 1983

Pakistan	4 - 3	Australia
	Report

Dubai, United Arab Emirates

Event: Test series
Second test match

10 December 1983

Pakistan	6 - 0	China
	Report

Kowloon, Hong Kong

Event: Hong Kong Jubilee Ten Nations Cup 1983
Pool match

11 December 1983

Great Britain	3 - 6	Pakistan
	[Report]

Kowloon, Hong Kong

Event: Hong Kong Jubilee Ten Nations Cup 1983
Pool match

12 December 1983

Pakistan	5 - 1	South Korea
	Report

Kowloon, Hong Kong

Event: Hong Kong Jubilee Ten Nations Cup 1983
Pool match

14 December 1983

Malaysia	0 - 2	Pakistan
	Report	Sardar 28'; Hanif 44'

Kowloon, Hong Kong

Event: Hong Kong Jubilee Ten Nations Cup 1983
Pool match

17 December 1983

Pakistan	4 - 1	India
Kaleemullah 23'; Hanif 30'; Sardar 48'; Dar 63'	Report	Praveen 24'

Kowloon, Hong Kong

Event: Hong Kong Jubilee Ten Nations Cup 1983
Semifinal

18 December 1983

Australia	3 - 1	Pakistan
	Report

Kowloon, Hong Kong

Event: Hong Kong Jubilee Ten Nations Cup 1983
Final

=== 1984 ===
TBD

Pakistan	-/-	Kenya
	[Record absent]

TBD, Pakistan

Event: Test match

5 April 1984

Pakistan	0 - 1	India
	Report

Kuwait City, Kuwait

Event: Test series
First test match

5 April 1984

Pakistan	0 - 1	India
	Report

Kuwait City, Kuwait

Event: Test series
Second test match

8 April 1984

Pakistan	1 - 1	India
	Report

Doha, Qatar

Event: Test series
Third test match

18 April 1984

Pakistan	2 - 0	Soviet Union
	Report

Lahore, Pakistan

Event: Test series
First test match

20 April 1984

Pakistan	4 - 1	Soviet Union
	Report

Islamabad, Pakistan

Event: Test series
Second test match

2 May 1984

France	0 - 2	Pakistan
	Report

Paris, France

Event: Test match

5 May 1984

France	1 - 1	Pakistan
	Report

Lille, France

Event: Test match

6 May 1984

Pakistan	5 - 1	Malaysia
	Report

Lille, France

Event: Test match

9 May 1984

Netherlands	4 - 5	Pakistan
van Grimbergen 34', 68'; Bouwman 35' van 't Hek 63'	Report	Manzoor Jr. 5'; Kaleemullah 27', 60'; Hanif 29', 42'

Amstelveen, Netherlands

Event: Test match

16 May 1984

Netherlands	0 - 2	Pakistan
	Report	Manzoor Jr. 18'; Sardar 70'

Amstelveen, Netherlands

Event: Test match

20 May 1984

Belgium	1 - 1	Pakistan
	Report

Brussels, Belgium

Event: Test match

23 May 1984

Spain	2 - 4	Pakistan
	Report

Terrassa, Spain

Event: Test match

27 May 1984

Spain	0 - 1	Pakistan
	Report	Hassan 37'

Madrid, Spain

Event: Test match

13 July 1984

Canada	0 - 3	Pakistan
	Report

Vancouver, Canada

Event: Test series
First test match

14 July 1984

Canada	2 - 2	Pakistan
	Report

Vancouver, Canada

Event: Test series
Second test match

30 July 1984

New Zealand	3 - 3	Pakistan
Daji 5', 68', 70+'	Report	Sardar 15', 46', 51'

Los Angeles, United States

Event: 1984 Summer Olympics
Pool match

1 August 1984

Kenya	0 - 3	Pakistan
	Report	Hanif 16'; Manzoor Jr. 30'; Sardar 32'

Los Angeles, United States

Event: 1984 Summer Olympics
Pool match

3 August 1984

Netherlands	3 - 3	Pakistan
T. Kruize 18'; Van't Hek 29'; J. Kruize 61'	Report	Hameed 35+'; Sardar 48'; Manzoor Jr. 64'

Los Angeles, United States

Event: 1984 Summer Olympics
Pool match

5 August 1984

Canada	1 - 7	Pakistan
Sandhu 46'	Report	Sardar 1', 34', 49'; Manzoor Jr. 13', 14', 51'; Hanif 22'

Los Angeles, United States

Event: 1984 Summer Olympics
Pool match

7 August 1984

Great Britain	0 - 0	Pakistan
	Report

Los Angeles, United States

Event: 1984 Summer Olympics
Pool match

9 August 1984

Australia	0 - 1	Pakistan
	Report	Sardar 22'

Los Angeles, United States

Event: 1984 Summer Olympics
Semifinal

11 August 1984

West Germany	1 - 2 (a.e.t.)	Pakistan
Peter 44'	Report	Sardar 50'; Kaleemullah 82'

Los Angeles, United States

Event: 1984 Summer Olympics
Final

20 October 1984

West Germany	4 - 2	Pakistan
	Report

Brussel, Belgium

Event: Test match

7 December 1984

New Zealand	1 - 5	Pakistan
Miskimmin 48'	Report	Hanif 21'; Sardar 31', 50'; Manzoor Jr. 47'; Kaleemullah 62'

Karachi, Pakistan

Event: 1984 Hockey Champions Trophy
Round-robin first match

9 December 1984

Pakistan	3 - 2	Spain
Kaleemullah 29', 46'; Mahmood 59'	Report	De Paz 4'; Arbós 70'

Karachi, Pakistan

Event: 1984 Hockey Champions Trophy
Round-robin second match

11 December 1984

Pakistan	2 - 2	Netherlands
Hanif 1'; Sardar 22'	Report	Den Hartog 16'; Steens 53'

Karachi, Pakistan

Event: 1984 Hockey Champions Trophy
Round-robin third match

12 December 1984

Great Britain	1 - 4	Pakistan
Potter 50'	Report	Kaleemullah 15', 28'; Hanif 54', 59'

Karachi, Pakistan

Event: 1984 Hockey Champions Trophy
Round-robin fourth match

14 December 1984

Australia	2 - 0	Pakistan
Birmingham 14'; Patmore 51'	Report

Karachi, Pakistan

Event: 1984 Hockey Champions Trophy
Round-robin fifth match

=== 1985 ===
20 January 1985

Pakistan	2 - 0	Japan
	Report

Dhaka, Bangladesh

Event: 1985 Hockey Asia Cup
Pool match

21 January 1985

Pakistan	16 - 0	Iran
	Report

Dhaka, Bangladesh

Event: 1985 Hockey Asia Cup
Pool match

22 January 1985

Bangladesh	0 - 1	Pakistan
	Report

Dhaka, Bangladesh

Event: 1985 Hockey Asia Cup
Pool match

23 January 1985

China	0 - 2	Pakistan
	Report

Dhaka, Bangladesh

Event: 1985 Hockey Asia Cup
Pool match

27 January 1985

Pakistan	7 - 0	South Korea
	Report

Dhaka, Bangladesh

Event: 1985 Hockey Asia Cup
Semifinal

28 January 1985

Pakistan	3 - 2 (a.e.t.)	India
Hanif 34'; Mushtaq 83'; Kaleemullah 87'	Report	Naim 57'; Hardeep 85'

Dhaka, Bangladesh

Event: 1985 Hockey Asia Cup
Final

TBD

Pakistan	-/-	France
	[Record absent]

TBD, Pakistan

Event: Test match

TBD

Pakistan	-/-	Belgium
	[Record absent]

TBD, Pakistan

Event: Test match

TBD

Pakistan	-/-	Belgium
	[Record absent]

TBD, Pakistan

Event: Test match

16 November 1985

Pakistan	1 - 2	India
Sardar 3'	Report	Shahid 4'; MP. Singh 10'

Perth, Australia

Event: 1985 Hockey Champions Trophy
Round-robin first match

17 November 1985

West Germany	3 - 1	Pakistan
Fischer 20', 49', 50'	Report	Feroz 47'

Perth, Australia

Event: 1985 Hockey Champions Trophy
Round-robin second match

19 November 1985

Netherlands	3 - 4	Pakistan
Kruize 27', 57'; Parlevliet 60'	Report	Qasim 24', 51'; Farhat 45'; Feroz 68'

Perth, Australia

Event: 1985 Hockey Champions Trophy
Round-robin third match

23 November 1985

Great Britain	1 - 1	Pakistan
Potter 6'	Report	Sardar 37'

Perth, Australia

Event: 1985 Hockey Champions Trophy
Round-robin fourth match

24 November 1985

Pakistan	3 - 1	Australia
Feroz 5'; Sardar 16'; Qasim 39'	Report	Charlesworth 41'

Perth, Australia

Event: 1985 Hockey Champions Trophy
Round-robin fifth match

28 November 1985

Malaysia	1 - 7	Pakistan
Sivabalan 24'	Report	Rashid 1', 13'; Qasim 6', 59'; Sardar 47', 52'; Hanif 67'

Ipoh, Malaysia

Event: 1985 Sultan Azlan Shah Cup
Pool match

29 November 1985

Pakistan	1 - 1	England
Rashid 10'	Report	Sherwani 39'

Ipoh, Malaysia

Event: 1985 Sultan Azlan Shah Cup
Pool match

2 December 1985

Pakistan	0 - 1	India
	Report	Hardeep 42'

Ipoh, Malaysia

Event: 1985 Sultan Azlan Shah Cup
Semifinal

3 December 1985

Pakistan	2 - 1	Spain
	Report

Ipoh, Malaysia

Event: 1985 Sultan Azlan Shah Cup
Third and fourth place

=== 1986 ===
3 January 1986

Great Britain	0–1	Pakistan
	Report	Sardar 51'

Dubai, United Arab Emirates

Event: Four Nations Dubai 1986
Round-robin first match

4 January 1986

Pakistan	2–4	Germany
	Report

Dubai, United Arab Emirates

Event: Four Nations Dubai 1986
Round-robin second match

5 January 1986

Pakistan	2–2	India
Farhat 49'; Mahmood 51'	Report	Shahid 6'; Iqbal 33'

Dubai, United Arab Emirates

Event: Four Nations Dubai 1986
Round-robin third match

8 January 1986

Netherlands	0–1	Pakistan
	Report	Feroz 25'

Kuwait City, Kuwait

Event: Four Nations Kuwait 1986
Round-robin first match

9 January 1986

Pakistan	2–3	Great Britain
Rashid 23'; Sardar 50'	Report	Sherwani 56'; Potter 62', 68'

Kuwait City, Kuwait

Event: Four Nations Kuwait 1986
Round-robin second match

10 January 1986

Pakistan	3–3	India
	Report

Kuwait City, Kuwait

Event: Four Nations Kuwait 1986
Round-robin third match

15 February 1986

India	2–3	Pakistan
	Report

Kolkata, India

Event: Test series
First test match

18 February 1986

India	2–1	Pakistan
	[Report]

Kolhapur, India

Event: Test series
Second test match

21 February 1986

India	6–3	Pakistan
	Report

Hyderabad, India

Event: Test series
Third test match

24 February 1986

Pakistan	3–2	India
	Report

Sialkot, Pakistan

Event: Test series
Fourth test match

26 February 1986

Pakistan	2–2	India
	Report

Sargodha, Pakistan

Event: Test series
Fifth test match

28 February 1986

Pakistan	3–3	India
	Report

Islamabad, Pakistan

Event: Test series
Sixth test match

2 March 1986

Pakistan	1–2	India
	Report

Karachi, Pakistan

Event: Test series
Seventh test match

4 April 1986

Pakistan	1–1	Great Britain
Sardar 64'	Report	Duthie 13'

Karachi, Pakistan

Event: 1986 Hockey Champions Trophy
Round-robin first match

6 April 1986

Pakistan	2–3	India
Sardar 33'; Qasim 36'	Report	Thoiba 30'; Mohamed 42'; Tikken 48'

Karachi, Pakistan

Event: 1986 Hockey Champions Trophy
Round-robin second match

8 April 1986

Pakistan	0–0	Netherlands
	Report

Karachi, Pakistan

Event: 1986 Hockey Champions Trophy
Round-robin third match

9 April 1986

Pakistan	1–1	West Germany
Sardar 17'	Report	Blöcher 30'

Karachi, Pakistan

Event: 1986 Hockey Champions Trophy
Round-robin fourth match

11 April 1986

Pakistan	3–1	Australia
Zia 6'; Sherwani 6'; Farhat 38'	Report	Hager 23'

Karachi, Pakistan

Event: 1986 Hockey Champions Trophy
Round-robin fifth match

TBD

Pakistan	-/-	Japan
	[Record absent]

TBD, Pakistan

Event: Test series

TBD

Pakistan	-/-	Japan
	[Record absent]

TBD, Pakistan

Event: Test series

13 June 1986

France	2–1	Pakistan
Marrin 15'; Mordac 63'	Report	Sheikh 29'

Paris, France

Event: Test match

15 June 1986

Spain	1–2	Pakistan
Escudé 34'	Report	Sardar 14'; Hussain 21'

Santander, Spain

Event: Test match

21 June 1986

Netherlands	2–1	Pakistan
van 't Hek 52'; Heijn 60'	Report	Shahbaz Sr. 13'

Amstelveen, Netherlands

Event: Test series
First test match

22 June 1986

Netherlands	1–0	Pakistan
Heijn 14'	Report

Tilburg, Netherlands

Event: Test series
Second test match

24 June 1986

Netherlands	0–2	Pakistan
	Report

Amstelveen, Netherlands

Event: Test series
Third test match

27 June 1986

Netherlands	1–1	Pakistan
Heijn 6'	Report	Sardar 1'

Assen, Netherlands

Event: Test series
Fourth test match

29 June 1986

Netherlands	0–1	Pakistan
	Report	Ali 42'

Amstelveen, Netherlands

Event: Test series

Fifth test match

1 July 1986

West Germany	0–1	Pakistan
	Report

Heidenheim, West Germany

Event: Test series
First test match

2 July 1986

West Germany	0–2	Pakistan
	Report	Riaz 6'; Fried (o.g) 12'

Heidelberg, West Germany

Event: Test series
Second test match

5 July 1986

Soviet Union	2–1	Pakistan
	Report

Leningrad, Soviet Union

Event: Four Nations Leningrad 1986
Round-robin first match

6 July 1986

Pakistan	3–1	France
	Report

Leningrad, Soviet Union

Event: Four Nations Leningrad 1986
Round-robin second match

8 July 1986

Pakistan	2–0	India
	Report

Leningrad, Soviet Union

Event: Four Nations Leningrad 1986
Round-robin third match

22 September 1986

Oman	0–12	Pakistan
	Report

Seongnam, South Korea

Event: 1986 Asian Games
Pool match

24 September 1986

Bangladesh	0–7	Pakistan
	Report

Seongnam, South Korea

Event: 1986 Asian Games
Pool match

26 September 1986

Malaysia	2–1	Pakistan
	Report

Seongnam, South Korea

Event: 1986 Asian Games
Pool match

28 September 1986

India	1–3 (a.e.t.)	Pakistan
Mohinder 14'	Report	Ishtiaq 10'; Farhat 81'; Shahbaz 85'

Seongnam, South Korea

Event: 1986 Asian Games
Semifinal

29 September 1986

Pakistan	1–2	South Korea
Ishtiaq 21'	Report	Jong-ryul 35', 54'

Seongnam, South Korea

Event: 1986 Asian Games
Final

4 October 1986

Pakistan	1–3	Argentina
Iqbal 6'	Report	Mascheroni 36'; Garraffo 50'; Verga 54'

London, England

Event: 1986 FIH Hockey World Cup
Pool match

6 October 1986

Pakistan	1–2	Netherlands
Mohib 21'	Report	Van Grimbergen 30'; Schlattman 58'

London, England

Event: 1986 FIH Hockey World Cup
Pool match

8 October 1986

New Zealand	3–5	Pakistan
Daji 34', 56'; Wilson 41'	Report	Ali 35'; Sardar 55'; Zia 65', 67', 69'

London, England

Event: 1986 FIH Hockey World Cup
Pool match

11 October 1986

England	3–1	Pakistan
Potter 8', 53'; Kerly 21'	Report	Kaleemullah 48'

London, England

Event: 1986 FIH Hockey World Cup
Pool match

13 October 1986

Pakistan	0–2	Soviet Union
	Report	Deputatov 48'; Pleshakov 52'

London, England

Event: 1986 FIH Hockey World Cup
Pool match

16 October 1986

Pakistan	1–2	Canada
Ali 43'	Report	Rutledge 18', 20'

London, England

Event: 1986 FIH Hockey World Cup
Crossover

17 October 1986

Pakistan	3–2 (a.e.t.)	India
Mohib 12'; Kaleemullah 43'; Ali 74'	Report	Mohinder 17', 64'

London, England

Event: 1986 FIH Hockey World Cup
Eleventh and twelfth place

=== 1987 ===
15 April 1987

Pakistan	4 - 2	Germany
Shahbaz Sr. 13'; Sardar 26'; Mohib 4'; Mushtaq 58'	Report

Ipoh, Malaysia

Event: 1987 Sultan Azlan Shah Cup
Pool match

15 April 1987

South Korea	2 - 5	Pakistan
	Report	Mohib 9'; Feroz 14'; Akhtar 19'; Mushtaq 34'; Farhat 53'

Ipoh, Malaysia

Event: 1987 Sultan Azlan Shah Cup
Pool match

19 April 1987

Pakistan	4 - 3 (a.e.t.)	Great Britain
Mohib 10', 59'; Sardar 72', 81'	Report	Grimley 35'; Potter 70', 74'

Ipoh, Malaysia

Event: 1987 Sultan Azlan Shah Cup
Semifinal

20 April 1987

Pakistan	2 - 3 (a.e.t.)	Germany
Sardar 10'; Feroz 19'	Report	Knaap 2'; Dopp 32'; Keller 86'

Ipoh, Malaysia

Event: 1987 Sultan Azlan Shah Cup
Final

TBD

Pakistan	-/-	Poland
	[Record absent]

TBD, Pakistan

Event: Test match

19 June 1987

Pakistan	2 - 0	Soviet Union
Shahbaz Sr. 48'; Haider 49'	Report

Amstelveen, Netherlands

Event: 1987 Hockey Champions Trophy
Round-robin first match

20 June 1987

Netherlands	2 - 1	Pakistan
Bovelander 46', 57'	Report	Haider 31'

Amstelveen, Netherlands

Event: 1987 Hockey Champions Trophy
Round-robin second match

22 June 1987

Argentina	2 - 0	Pakistan
Garraffo 49'; Pailos 70'	Report

Amstelveen, Netherlands

Event: 1987 Hockey Champions Trophy
Round-robin third match

23 June 1987

West Germany	2 - 1	Pakistan
Schmidt-Opper 15'; Dopp 60'	Report	Farhat 64'

Amstelveen, Netherlands

Event: 1987 Hockey Champions Trophy
Round-robin fourth match

25 June 1987

Pakistan	1 - 2	Spain
Haider 31'	Report	Escudé 32'; Peón 60'

Amstelveen, Netherlands

Event: 1987 Hockey Champions Trophy
Round-robin fifth match

26 June 1987

Australia	3 - 1	Pakistan
Hager 32'; Haselhurst 40'; Hawgood 54'	Report	Rashid 15'

Amstelveen, Netherlands

Event: 1987 Hockey Champions Trophy
Round-robin sixth match

28 June 1987

Great Britain	5 - 3	Pakistan
Kerly 11', 20', 25'; Shaw 46'; Barber 60'	Report	Qasim 38', 58'; Maqsood 50'

Amstelveen, Netherlands

Event: 1987 Hockey Champions Trophy
Round-robin seventh match

9 October 1987

Pakistan	4 - 3	Poland
	Report

London, England

Event: Lada International Hockey Classics 1987
Round-robin first match

11 October 1987

Pakistan	1 - 0	Malaysia
Ali 34'	Report

London, England

Event: Lada International Hockey Classics 1987
Round-robin second match

12 October 1987

Great Britain	1 - 1	Pakistan
Kirkwood 40'	Report	Qasim 57'

London, England

Event: Lada International Hockey Classics 1987
Round-robin third match

24 November 1987

Pakistan	9 - 1	South Korea
	Report

Karachi, Pakistan

Event: Test match
First test match

26 November 1987

Pakistan	2 - 0	South Korea
	Report

Karachi, Pakistan

Event: Test match
Second test match

2 December 1987

Pakistan	2 - 3	Netherlands
Irfan 15'; Bashir	Report	Kooijman 24'; Bovelander 31'; Weterings 51'

Karachi, Pakistan

Event: Test series
First test match

6 December 1987

Pakistan	1 - 4	Netherlands
Ali 15'	Report	Delissen 34'; Bovelander 46', 67'; Weterings 49'

Quetta, Pakistan

Event: Test series
Second test match

8 December 1987

Pakistan	3 - 1	Netherlands
Shahbaz Sr. 22'; Haider 63', 66'	Report	van Ede 62'

Lahore, Pakistan

Event: Test series
Third test match

10 December 1987

Pakistan	2 - 1	Netherlands
Qamar 11'; Sharif 14'	Report	Delissen 53'

Islamabad, Pakistan

Event: Test series
Fourth test match

13 December 1987

Pakistan	1 - 0	Netherlands
Shahbaz Sr. 32'	Report

Karachi, Pakistan

Event: Test series
Fifth test match

=== 1988 ===
10 January 1988

Pakistan	5 - 1	Kenya
Mohib 13', 44'; Irfan 21'; Feroz 33'; Shahbaz Sr. 56'	Report	Akatsa 40'

Lucknow, India

Event: Indira Gandhi Gold Cup 1988
Pool match

11 January 1988

Pakistan	4 - 0	New Zealand
Qasim 21'; Shahbaz Sr. 32'; Irfan 38'; Bashir 69'	Report

Lucknow, India

Event: Indira Gandhi Gold Cup 1988
Pool match

13 January 1988

Spain	0 - 4	Pakistan
	Report

Lucknow, India

Event: Indira Gandhi Gold Cup 1988
Pool match

15 January 1988

Pakistan	1 - 0	South Korea
Shahbaz Sr. 55'	Report

Lucknow, India

Event: Indira Gandhi Gold Cup 1988
Semifinal

17 January 1988

Pakistan	3 - 0	Soviet Union
Sharif 14'; Shahbaz Sr. 28'; Qasim 50'	Report

Lucknow, India

Event: Indira Gandhi Gold Cup 1988
Final

25 March 1988

Pakistan	1 - 1	Soviet Union
Shiekh 27'	Report	Boekatin 62'

Lahore, Pakistan

Event: 1988 Hockey Champions Trophy
Round-robin first match

26 March 1988

Pakistan	4 - 0	Spain
	Report

Lahore, Pakistan

Event: 1988 Hockey Champions Trophy
Round-robin second match

29 March 1988

West Germany	1 - 2	Pakistan
Keller 60'	Report	Bashir 26'; Sharif 55'

Lahore, Pakistan

Event: 1988 Hockey Champions Trophy
Round-robin third match

30 March 1988

Great Britain	0 - 1	Pakistan
	Report	Sharif 40'

Lahore, Pakistan

Event: 1988 Hockey Champions Trophy
Round-robin fourth match

1 April 1988

Pakistan	1 - 1	Australia
Irfan 22'	Report	Birmingham 55'

Lahore, Pakistan

Event: 1988 Hockey Champions Trophy
Round-robin fifth match

31 May 1988

Pakistan	4 - 0	Great Britain
Qasim 10'; Mohib 52'; Shahbaz Sr. 64', 67'	Report

Ipoh, Malaysia

Event: Perak International Ipoh 1988
Pool match

1 June 1988

Malaysia	0 - 7	Pakistan
	Report	Sharif 2'; Shiekh 8', 23'; Ali 11'; Qasim 20'; Shahbaz Sr. 30'; Bashir 57'

Ipoh, Malaysia

Event: Perak International Ipoh 1988
Pool match

4 June 1988

Pakistan	1 - 1 (a.e.t.)	South Korea
Irfan 88'	Report	Jae-sik 90'
Penalties
	3 - 5

Ipoh, Malaysia

Event: Perak International Ipoh 1988
Semifinal

5 June 1988

Pakistan	3 - 1	Soviet Union
Mohib 18'; Sharif 24'; Shahbaz 30'	Report	Davydov 34'

Ipoh, Malaysia

Event: Perak International Ipoh 1988
Third and fourth place

12 June 1988

Kenya	1 - 2	Pakistan
	Report

Nairobi, Kenya

Event: Marshalls International Cup Nairobi 1988
Round-robin first match

14 June 1988

Pakistan	4 - 1	Soviet Union
	Report

Nairobi, Kenya

Event: Marshalls International Cup Nairobi 1988
Round-robin second match

16 June 1988

Pakistan	5 - 2	Canada
	Report

Nairobi, Kenya

Event: Marshalls International Cup Nairobi 1988
Round-robin third match

18 June 1988

India	3 - 0	Pakistan
	Report

Nairobi, Kenya

Event: Marshalls International Cup Nairobi 1988
Round-robin fourth match

19 June 1988

India	2 - 2 (a.e.t.)	Pakistan
	Report
Penalties
	3 - 0

Nairobi, Kenya

Event: Marshalls International Cup Nairobi 1988
Final

24 June 1988

Pakistan	5 - 1	Soviet Union
	Report

Nairobi, Kenya

Event: Nairobi Three Nations
Round-robin first match

26 June 1988

Kenya	1 - 5	Pakistan
	Report

Nairobi, Kenya

Event: Nairobi Three Nations
Round-robin second match

3 July 1988

Zimbabwe	1 - 7	Pakistan
	Report

Harare, Zimbabwe

Event: Test series
First test match

TBD

Zimbabwe	-/-	Pakistan
	[Record absent]

TBD, Zimbabwe

Event: Test series
Second test match

TBD

Zimbabwe	-/-	Pakistan
	[Record absent]

TBD, Zimbabwe

Event: Test series
Third test match

TBD

Zimbabwe	-/-	Pakistan
	[Record absent]

TBD, Zimbabwe

Event: Test series
Fourth test match

29 July 1988

India	3 - 2	Pakistan
Pargat 22'; Thoiba 27', 29'	Report	Shahbaz Sr. 50'; Sheikh 67'

Delhi, India

Event: Test series
First test match

1 August 1988

India	2 - 1	Pakistan
Felix 21'; Balwinder 49'	Report	Mohib 29'

Lucknow, India

Event: Test series
Second test match

5 August 1988

India	1 - 2	Pakistan
Jagbir 40'	Report	Mohib 31', 53'

Gwalior, India

Event: Test series
Third test match

7 August 1988

Pakistan	1 - 1	India
Mohib 32'	Report	Sujit 64'

Lahore, Pakistan

Event: Test series
Fourth test match

9 August 1988

Pakistan	1 - 1	India
Mohib 23'	Report	Pargat 53'

Quetta, Pakistan

Event: Test series
Fifth test match

11 August 1988

Pakistan	3 - 2	India
Sheikh 18', 31'; Mohib 41'	Report	Ashok 62'; Jagbir 39'

Karachi, Pakistan

Event: Test series
Sixth test match

18 September 1988

Pakistan	5 - 1	Spain
Qamar 42', 59'; Zahid 44', 51'; Sheikh 61'	Report	Peón 23'

Seoul, South Korea

Event: 1988 Summer Olympics
Pool match

20 September 1988

Pakistan	8 - 0	Kenya
Sheikh 8', 9', 47', 52'; Mohib 16'; Sharif 33'; Shahbaz 64', 66'	Report

Seoul, South Korea

Event: 1988 Summer Olympics
Pool match

22 September 1988

Pakistan	2 - 1	Argentina
Shahbaz 23'; Sharif 60'	Report	Mascheroni 68'

Seoul, South Korea

Event: 1988 Summer Olympics
Pool match

24 September 1988

Australia	4 - 0	Pakistan
Hager 9'; Bestall 23'; Hawgood 31', 32'	Report

Seoul, South Korea

Event: 1988 Summer Olympics
Pool match

26 September 1988

Netherlands	2 - 0	Pakistan
Bovelander 2', 31'	Report

Seoul, South Korea

Event: 1988 Summer Olympics
Pool match

28 September 1988

Pakistan	1 - 0	Soviet Union
Mohib 42'	Report

Seoul, South Korea

Event: 1988 Summer Olympics
Crossover

30 September 1988

India	1 - 2	Pakistan
M. Singh 68'	Report	Musaddiq 22'; Mohib 50'

Seoul, South Korea

Event: 1988 Summer Olympics
Fifth and sixth place

=== 1989 ===
14 January 1989

Pakistan	2 - 0	Spain
Saeed 1'; Mohib 28'	Report

Lucknow, India

Event: Indira Gandhi Gold Cup 1989
Pool match

17 January 1989

Pakistan	5 - 1	Malaysia
Feroz 17'; Qamar 30', 43'; Sharif 54'; Irfan 60'	Report	Sivabalan 47'

Lucknow, India

Event: Indira Gandhi Gold Cup 1989
Pool match

19 January 1989

Netherlands	2 - 1	Pakistan
Parlevliet 62'; Delissen 67'	Report	Bhopali 50'

Lucknow, India

Event: Indira Gandhi Gold Cup 1989
Pool match

21 January 1989

India	0 - 3	Pakistan
	Report	Feroz 7'; Irfan 62', 64'

Lucknow, India

Event: Indira Gandhi Gold Cup 1989
Semifinal

22 January 1989

Netherlands	1 - 2	Pakistan
Parlevliet 68'	Report	Mohib 37'; Bhopali 44'

Lucknow, India

Event: Indira Gandhi Gold Cup 1989
Final

11 June 1989

Pakistan	3 - 4	Australia
Zahid 26'; Feroz 56'; Qamar 65'	Report	Hager 10', 37'; York 29'; Evans 50'

West Berlin, West Germany

Event: 1989 Hockey Champions Trophy
Round-robin first match

13 June 1989

Netherlands	3 - 2	Pakistan
Bovelander 13', 27', 49'	Report	Zahid 31'; Feroz 50'

West Berlin, West Germany

Event: 1989 Hockey Champions Trophy
Round-robin second match

14 June 1989

India	0 - 1	Pakistan
	Report	Qamar 24'

West Berlin, West Germany

Event: 1989 Hockey Champions Trophy
Round-robin third match

16 June 1989

Great Britain	1 - 2	Pakistan
Kerly 47'	Report	Zahid 11'; Bhopali 27'

West Berlin, West Germany

Event: 1989 Hockey Champions Trophy
Round-robin fourth match

18 June 1989

West Germany	4 - 1	Pakistan
Fischer 23', 52', 58'; Hilgers 32'	Report	Qamar 60'

West Berlin, West Germany

Event: 1989 Hockey Champions Trophy
Round-robin fifth match

5 December 1989

Pakistan	5 - 1	England
Feroz 29'; Zaman 35', 48'; Shahbaz Sr. 37'; Bashir 47'	Report	Thompson 57'

Lahore, Pakistan

Event: Test series
First test match

8 December 1989

Pakistan	4 - 1	England
	Report

Lahore, Pakistan

Event: Test series
Second test match

TBD

Pakistan	-/-	Japan
	[Record absent]

TBD, Pakistan

Event: Test series
First test match

TBD

Pakistan	-/-	Japan
	[Record absent]

TBD, Pakistan

Event: Test series
Second test match

20 December 1989

Pakistan	2 - 0	Japan
Saeed 5'; Qamar 18'	Report

New Delhi, India

Event: 1989 Hockey Asia Cup
Pool match

24 December 1989

Pakistan	4 - 1	Malaysia
Bhopali 16'; Shahbaz Sr. 37'; Bashir 42', 57'	Report	Zaini 21'

New Delhi, India

Event: 1989 Hockey Asia Cup
Pool match

26 December 1989

Pakistan	3 - 3 (a.e.t.)	South Korea
Bashir 53'; Mohib 68', 78'	Report	Shin-huem 24'; Seon-jong 35'; Jung-hwan 80'
Penalties
	5 - 1

New Delhi, India

Event: 1989 Hockey Asia Cup
Semifinal

28 December 1989

Pakistan	2 - 0	India
Shahbaz Sr. 29'; Bhopali 64'	Report

New Delhi, India

Event: 1989 Hockey Asia Cup
Final

== Head-to-head record ==
Won more matches than lost
Won equal matches to lost
Lost more matches than won

Opponent	GP	W	D	L	GF	GA	First meeting	Last meeting
India	46	22	9	15	111	79	1980	1989
Netherlands	32	14	5	13	61	64	1980	1989
Australia	20	6	3	11	43	48	1980	1989
Malaysia	17	16	0	1	65	9	1980	1989
West Germany	17	10	2	5	38	29	1980	1989
Great Britain	14	8	4	2	36	20	1980	1989
Soviet Union	13	10	1	2	37	11	1981	1988
Kenya	13	11	2	0	57	9	1980	1988
Spain	14	13	0	1	46	14	1980	1989
South Korea	10	8	0	2	44	10	1982	1989
Japan	9	9	0	0	56	7	1982	1989
Zimbabwe	9	9	0	0	47	4	1980	1988
New Zealand	8	7	1	0	39	13	1981	1988
England	6	4	1	1	16	9	1981	1989
Canada	5	3	1	1	18	7	1984	1988
France	5	3	1	1	10	4	1984	1986
China	5	5	0	0	34	1	1982	1985
Argentina	4	2	0	2	9	7	1981	1988
Poland	4	4	0	0	13	6	1981	1987
Bangladesh	3	3	0	0	17	0	1982	1986
Belgium	3	2	1	0	5	3	1984	1985
Singapore	2	2	0	0	10	1	1981	1982
Oman	1	1	0	0	12	0	1986	-
Iran	1	1	0	0	16	0	1985	-
Sri Lanka	1	1	0	0	14	0	1982	-
