= 1984 Men's Hockey Champions Trophy =

Field hockey tournament

Tournament details
- Host country: Pakistan
- City: Karachi
- Dates: 7–14 December
- Teams: 6 (from 3 confederations)

Final positions
- Champions: Australia (2nd title)
- Runner-up: Pakistan
- Third place: Great Britain

Tournament statistics
- Matches played: 15
- Goals scored: 63 (4.2 per match)
- Top scorer: (Pakistan) Kaleemullah Khan (5 goals)

The 1984 Men's Hockey Champions Trophy was the sixth edition of the Hockey Champions Trophy, an international men's field hockey tournament. It took place from 7 until 14 December 1984 in Karachi, Pakistan. Australia won the tournament for the second time in a row by finishing first in the round-robin tournament.

== Teams ==
Team	Appearance	Last Appearance	Previous best performance
Australia	6th	1983	1st (1983)
Great Britain	3rd	1980	3rd (1978)
Netherlands	5th	1983	1st (1981, 1982)
New Zealand	3rd	1983	4th (1978)
Pakistan	6th	1983	1st (1978, 1980)
Spain	4th	1981	5th (1978, 1981)

== Results ==
=== Pool ===
Pos	Team	Pld	W	D	L	GF	GA	GD	Pts
1st place, gold medalist(s)	Australia (C)	5	4	1	0	12	6	+6	9
2nd place, silver medalist(s)	Pakistan (H)	5	3	1	1	14	8	+6	7
3rd place, bronze medalist(s)	Great Britain	5	2	1	2	13	11	+2	5
4	Netherlands	5	2	1	2	9	8	+1	5
5	New Zealand	5	0	2	3	8	15	−7	2
6	Spain	5	0	1	4	7	15	−8	1

Source: FIH
(C) Champions; (H) Hosts

7 December 1984
09:00

Great Britain	3–1	Spain
Cattrall 7'; Kerly 35'; Duthie 39'	Report	Figar 67'

Umpires:
Shafat Baghdadi (PAK)
Iwo Sakaida (JPN)

7 December 1984
11:00

Australia	2–0	Netherlands
Walsh 56', 63'	Report

Umpires:
Richard Kendrick (IRL)
Jose-Maria Rada (ARG)

7 December 1984
15:00

New Zealand	1–5	Pakistan
Miskimmin 48'	Report	A. Khan 21'; Sardar 31', 50'; Hussain 47'; K. Khan 62'

Umpires:
Claude Seidler (GER)
Jose-Maria Benito (ESP)

8 December 1984
13:30

Great Britain	3–4	Australia
Kerly 30'; Bhaura 34'; Potter 51'	Report	Walsh 26', 48'; Mitton 32'; Nobbs 54'

Umpires:
Khizar Bajwa (PAK)
Joseph Nienhaus (NED)

8 December 1984
15:30

Netherlands	2–1	New Zealand
Den Hartog 10'; Van Heyn 42'	Report	Daji 51'

Umpires:
Younis Siddiqi (PAK)
Resham Singh Baines (KEN)

9 December 1984
15:00

Pakistan	3–2	Spain
K. Khan 29', 46'; Mehmood 59'	Report	De Paz 4'; Arbós 70'

Umpires:
Douglas Bruce (GBR)
Dennis Meredith (AUS)

10 December 1984
13:30

New Zealand	1–3	Great Britain
Smith 7'	Report	Potter 22'; Kerly 27'; Cattrall 57'

Umpires:
Jose-Marie Rada (ARG)
Shafat Baghdadi (PAK)

10 December 1984
15:30

Australia	2–1	Spain
Batch 52'; Mitton 63'	Report	Cobos 55'

Umpires:
Claude Seidler (GER)
Younis Siddiqi (PAK)

11 December 1984
13:30

Pakistan	2–2	Netherlands
A. Khan 1'; Sardar 22'	Report	Den Hartog 16'; Steens 53'

Umpires:
Dennis Meredith (AUS)
Iwo Sakaida (JPN)

11 December 1984
15:30

Australia	2–2	New Zealand
Patmore 5'; Davies 8'	Report	McLeod 52'; Wilson 54'

Umpires:
Richard Kendrick (IRL)
Douglas Bruce (GBR)

12 December 1984
13:30

Netherlands	4–0	Spain
Van Heyn 19', 39', 49'; Den Hartog 40'	Report

Umpires:
Douglas Bruce (GBR)
Khizar Bajwa (PAK)

12 December 1984
15:30

Great Britain	1–4	Pakistan
Potter 50'	Report	K. Khan 15', 28'; A. Khan 54', 59'

Umpires:
Joseph Nienhaus (NED)
Jose-Maria Benito (ESP)

13 December 1984
15:00

Spain	3–3	New Zealand
Arbós 28', 41', 56'	Report	Daji 25', 59'; Leslie 69'

Umpires:
Resham Singh Baines (KEN)
Richard Kendrick (IRL)

14 December 1984
09:00

Netherlands	1–3	Great Britain
Van Grimbergen 47'	Report	Kerly 3'; Bhaura 5'; Duthie 10'

Umpires:
Dennis Meredith (AUS)
Jose-Maria Benito (ESP)

14 December 1984
15:00

Australia	2–0	Pakistan
Birmingham 14'; Patmore 51'	Report

Umpires:
Claude Seidler (GER)
Iwo Sakaida (JPN)

== Statistics ==
=== Final standings ===
1. Australia
2. Pakistan
3. Great Britain
4. Netherlands
5. New Zealand
6. Spain

=== Goalscorers ===
There were 63 goals scored in 15 matches, for an average of 4.2 goals per match.

5 goals

- (Pakistan) Kaleemullah Khan

4 goals

- (Australia) Terry Walsh
- (United Kingdom) Sean Kerly
- (Netherlands) Ronald van Heyn
- (Pakistan) Abdul Khan
- (Spain) Jaime Arbos

3 goals

- (United Kingdom) Jon Potter
- (Netherlands) Arno den Hartog
- (New Zealand) Peter Daji
- (Pakistan) Hasan Sardar

2 goals

- (Australia) Grant Mitton
- (Australia) Nigel Patmore
- (United Kingdom) Kulbir Bhaura
- (United Kingdom) Bob Cattrall
- (United Kingdom) James Duthie

1 goal

- (Australia) Colin Batch
- (Australia) Warren Birmingham
- (Australia) Craig Davies
- (Australia) Michael Nobbs
- (Netherlands) Maarten van Grimbergen
- (Netherlands) Ronaldus Steens
- (New Zealand) Chris Leslie
- (New Zealand) Grant McLeod
- (New Zealand) Peter Miskimmin
- (New Zealand) Jamie Smith
- (New Zealand) Robin Wilson
- (Pakistan) Manzoor Hussain
- (Pakistan) Ayaz Mehmood
- (Spain) Ignacio Cobos
- (Spain) Cesar Figar
- (Spain) Miguel de Paz

Source: FIH
