= Graham Reid (field hockey) =

Australian field hockey player

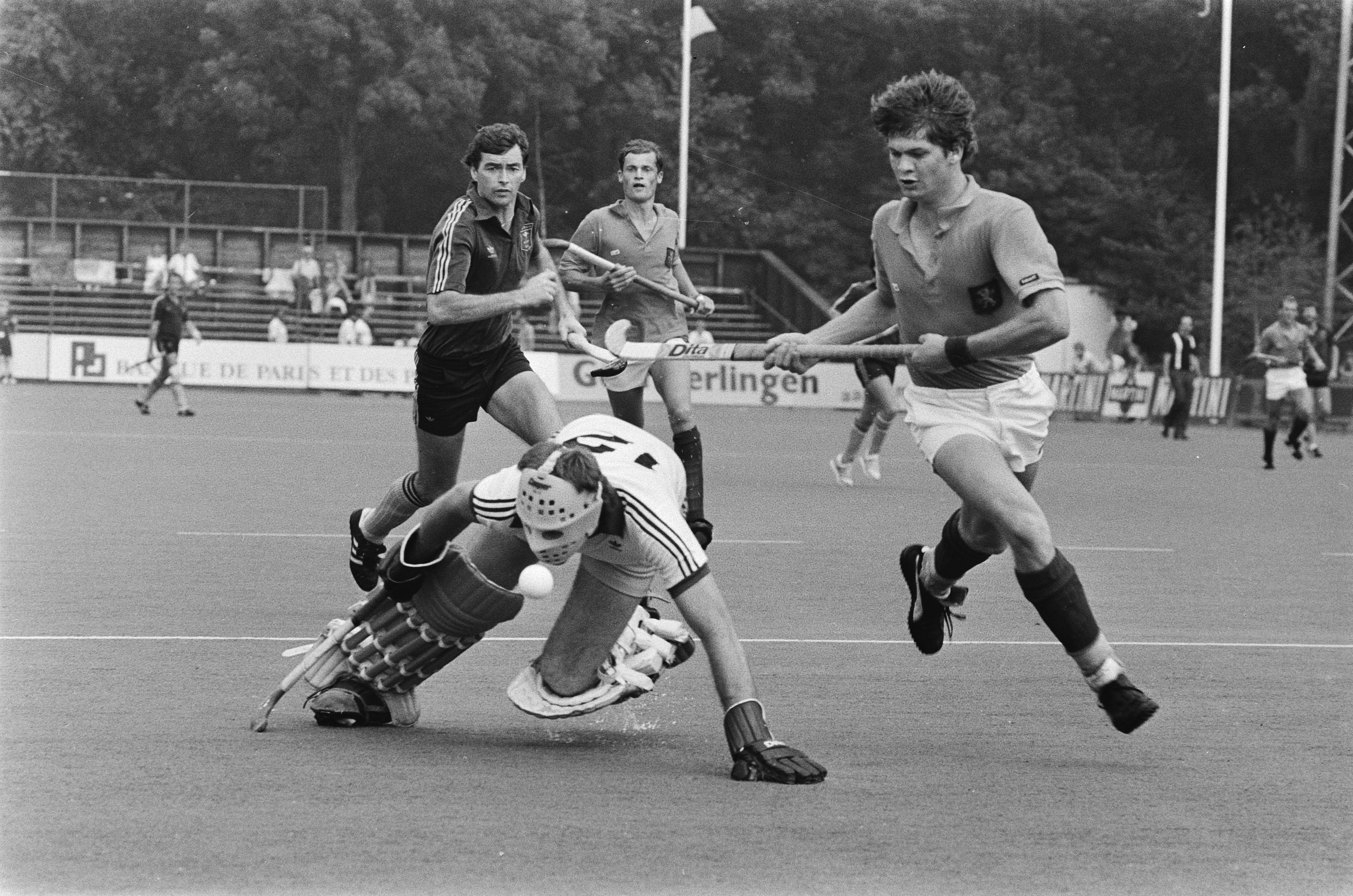
- Graham Reid (shirt 12) and Maarten van Grimbergen, 1982 Men's Hockey Champions Trophy

Personal information
- Full name: Graham John Reid
- Born: 9 April 1964 (age 62) Redcliffe City, Queensland
- Height: 1.80 m (5 ft 11 in)
- Weight: 83 kg (183 lb)

Sport
- Sport: Field hockey
- Position: Defender / Midfielder
- Club: India (coach)
National team
| Years | Team | Caps | Goals |
| – | Australia | 130 | (36) |
Coaching career
- Years: Team
- 2009–2014: Australia (assistant)
- 2014–2016: Australia
- 2017–2019: Netherlands (assistant)
- 2017–2019: Amsterdam
- 2019–2023: India
- 2024–: Delhi SG Pipers
Medal record
Men's field hockey
Representing Australia
Olympic Games
| Silver medal – second place | 1992 Barcelona | Team |
World Cup
| Bronze medal – third place | 1990 Lahore |
Champions Trophy
| Gold medal – first place | 1984 Karachi |
| Gold medal – first place | 1985 Perth |
| Gold medal – first place | 1989 Berlin |
| Gold medal – first place | 1990 Melbourne |
| Silver medal – second place | 1986 Karachi |
| Silver medal – second place | 1992 Lahore |
| Bronze medal – third place | 1987 Amstelveen |
| Bronze medal – third place | 1988 Lahore |

Graham John Reid (born 9 April 1964) is a former Australian field hockey player who played as a defender and midfielder for the Australian national team. He managed the Indian men's national team that won a bronze medal at the 2020 Summer Olympics.

He was a member of the team that won the silver medal at the 1992 Summer Olympics in Barcelona, Spain. Afterwards he played club hockey for the Dutch top team Amsterdam for two seasons (1993, 1994) returning in 1995 to play the Europa cup.

Reid played 130 internationals for Australia scoring 36 goals including two Olympic Games (1988, 1992), one World Cup (1990) and nine Champions Trophies (1984, 85, 86, 87, 88, 89, 90, 91, and 92). He has also won the Olympians medal (WA Best and Fairest medal) 3 times (1995, 96, and 98) whilst playing for Victoria Park Panthers.

He wasan inaugural member of the Australian Institute of Sport (AIS) hockey unit in Perth, Western Australia in 1984 and despite stints back in Queensland, Amsterdam and Bangalore, Reid has his home in Perth. He and his wife Julia have two children, Scott (1998) and Emma (1997).

== Managerial career ==
In 2009, he was appointed assistant coach of the Australian Men's Hockey Team (Kookaburras). During this time he was given the opportunity to take on the head coach position for the Champions Trophy in Melbourne in 2012. He guided the team to their 5th consecutive Champions Trophy gold medal. In October 2013 he was given another opportunity to lead the Kookaburras at the Oceania Cup in Stratford, New Zealand. Here the Kookaburras won the Oceania Cup by defeating New Zealand 5 - 2 in the final and qualified for the 2014 World Cup in Den Haag. .

In 2014 he and Paul Gaudoin co-coached the Kookaburras to a gold medal at the Commonwealth Games in Glasgow. In September 2014 he was announced as the head coach of the Kookaburras following the retirement of Ric Charlesworth.

During 2015 the Kookaburras continued their successful reign as world number 1 with qualification for the 2016 Rio Olympics by winning the World League Semi-Final tournament in Antwerp after beating Belgium after the final whistle. The World League final was held in December 2015 in Raipur, India. Australia again was victorious in the final of this competition defeating Belgium again, capturing the only World title to have eluded Australia.

On 21 November 2015 Graham was inducted into the Queensland Hockey Hall of Fame.

In the Olympic year, the Kookaburras won the 14th Champions Trophy held in London in June 2016. It was Reid's 2nd Champions Trophy title as head coach. It finished controversially after Australia defeated India in the final after sudden death penalty shootouts (3-1).

After the 2016 Summer Olympics, he stepped down as the Australia head coach and in 2017 he became the head coach of his former club Amsterdam and the assistant coach of the Dutch national team. In March 2019, he was dismissed as Amsterdam coach after an 8–2 loss to HGC in the league and alleged interest from the Indian national team for his services.

== Coach of Indian men's team ==
In April 2019 he was appointed as the head coach of the Indian national team, which also meant he had to leave his position as assistant coach of the Dutch national team.

At the Tokyo Olympics, under his coaching, the Indian team won the bronze medal, defeating Germany in the bronze-medal match. It was India's first podium finish in field hockey after the 1980 Olympics.

He was the coach at the 2021 Men's FIH Hockey Junior World Cup held in Bhubaneswar where the team finished fourth.

He stepped down as Indian men's hockey team chief coach following poor performance of Indian team in 2023 Men's FIH Hockey World Cup. He is holding the record for longest service coach of Indian National Hockey Team.
