= 1982 Men's Hockey Champions Trophy =

Field hockey tournament

Tournament details
- Host country: Netherlands
- City: Amstelveen
- Dates: 6–13 June
- Teams: 6 (from 3 confederations)
- Venue: Wagener Stadium

Final positions
- Champions: Netherlands (2nd title)
- Runner-up: Australia
- Third place: India

Tournament statistics
- Matches played: 15
- Goals scored: 94 (6.27 per match)
- Top scorer(s): (Australia) Craig Davies (Netherlands) Ties Kruize (9 goals)

The 1982 Men's Hockey Champions Trophy was the 4th edition of the Hockey Champions Trophy, an international men's field hockey tournament. It took place from 6 June to 13 June in Amstelveen, Netherlands. The Netherlands won the tournament for the second time in a row by finishing first in the round-robin tournament.

== Results ==
=== Pool ===
Pos	Team	Pld	W	D	L	GF	GA	GD	Pts
1st place, gold medalist(s)	Netherlands (C, H)	5	4	1	0	21	10	+11	9
2nd place, silver medalist(s)	Australia	5	2	2	1	20	14	+6	6
3rd place, bronze medalist(s)	India	5	3	0	2	16	20	−4	6
4	Pakistan	5	2	1	2	21	19	+2	5
5	West Germany	5	1	2	2	10	14	−4	4
6	Soviet Union	5	0	0	5	6	17	−11	0

Source: FIH
(C) Champions; (H) Hosts

6 June 1982
13:30

Pakistan	6–1	West Germany
A. Khan 17', 28'; I. Ahmed 35'; K. Khan 57', 68'; Sardar 66'	Report	Wistuba 35'

Umpires:
Louismichel Gillet (FRA)
Ian Pitt (AUS)

6 June 1982
15:30

Netherlands	4–3	Australia
Bouwman 18', 20'; Van Grimbergen 37'; Diepeveen 51'	Report	Charlesworth 1', 38'; Davies 32'

Umpires:
J Stelter (FRG)
Manuel Alcantara (ESP)

6 June 1982
17:30

India	4–2	Soviet Union
Fernandes 10'; S. Singh 13'; Kumar 34'; R. Singh 50'	Report	Pleshakov 21'; Michournov 44'

Umpires:
Gerrit Hagels (NED)
Rob Lathouwers (NED)

7 June 1982
17:00

Pakistan	5–2	Soviet Union
S. Ahmed 28'; Sardar 29'; S. Khan 35'; K. Khan 53'; A. Khan 59'	Report	Pleshakov 25'; Goncharov 60'

Umpires:
Alain Renaud (FRA)
T Havelock (AUS)

7 June 1982
19:00

West Germany	2–3	India
Peter 39'; Schmidt-Opper 68'	Report	G. Singh 48'; J. Singh 60'; Shahid 69'

Umpires:
Japik Riemersma (NED)
L Ghaznavi (PAK)

9 June 1982
17:00

Netherlands	3–3	West Germany
Van Grimbergen 37'; Pierik 39'; Bouwman 60'	Report	Blöcher 33', 44'; Peter 45'

Umpires:
Patrick van Beneden (BEL)
Ian Pitt (AUS)

9 June 1982
19:00

Pakistan	4–4	Australia
Manzoor-Ul-Hassan 8', 27'; A. Khan 19'; Sardar 52'	Report	Haselhurst 10'; Davies 13', 68'; Irvine 63'

Umpires:
Gerrit Hagels (NED)
Louismichel Gillet (FRA)

10 June 1982
17:00

India	2–5	Netherlands
J. Singh 43', 63'	Report	Kruize 30', 45', 66'; Bouwman 32', 47'

Umpires:
J Stelter (FRG)
Alain Renaud (FRA)

10 June 1982
19:00

Soviet Union	2–4	Australia
Michournov 27'; Nitchepurenko 66'	Report	Leece 23'; Davies 25', 28', 41'

Umpires:
Manuel Alcantara (ESP)
L Ghaznavi (PAK)

12 June 1982
11:30

West Germany	2–2	Australia
Blöcher 22'; Canninueberg 60'	Report	Charlesworth 30', 39'

Umpires:
Rob Lathouwers (NED)
Japik Riemersma (NED)

12 June 1982
13:30

Pakistan	4–5	India
S. Khan 10'; Zia 12'; Sardar 16', 53'	Report	R. Singh 25', 30', 46'; G. Singh 58'; S. Singh 59'

Umpires:
J Stelter (FRG)
Ian Pitt (AUS)

12 June 1982
15:30

Netherlands	2–0	Soviet Union
Bouwman 9'; Kruize 42'	Report

Umpires:
Patrick van Beneden (BEL)
T Havelock (AUS)

13 June 1982
11:30

Australia	7–2	India
Francis 15', 50'; Charlesworth 16'; Haselhurst 39'; Davies 43', 56', 68'	Report	R. Singh 18'; Fernandes 30'

Umpires:
Patrick van Beneden (BEL)
J Stelter (FRG)

13 June 1982
13:30

Soviet Union	0–2	West Germany
	Report	Peter 3'; Hürter 29'

Umpires:
L Ghaznavi (PAK)
Gerrit Hagels (NED)

13 June 1982
15:30

Netherlands	7–2	Pakistan
Kruize 4', 14', 39', 56', 61'; Van 't Hek 11'; Bouwman 26'	Report	Sardar 33'; Manzoor 69'

Umpires:
Louismichel Gillet (FRA)
Alain Renaud (FRA)

== Final standings ==
1. Netherlands
2. Australia
3. India
4. Pakistan
5. West Germany
6. Soviet Union
