= Colin Batch =

Australian field hockey player

Personal information
- Born: 27 March 1958 (age 68) Melbourne, Australia
- Height: 1.85 m (6 ft 1 in)
- Weight: 74 kg (163 lb)

Sport
- Sport: Field hockey
National team
Years	Team	Caps	Goals
1979–1990	Australia	175	(100)
Coaching career
- Years: Team
- 2010–2011: Dragons
- 2010–2012: Belgium
- 2012–2016: New Zealand
- 2017–2024: Australia
- 2024–: Rarh Bengal Tigers
Medal record
Men's Field hockey
Representing Australia
World Cup
Gold medal – first place	1986 London
Bronze medal – third place	1982 Mumbai
Bronze medal – third place	1990 Lahore
Champions Trophy
Gold medal – first place	1983 Karachi
Gold medal – first place	1984 Karachi
Gold medal – first place	1985 Perth
Gold medal – first place	1989 Berlin
Silver medal – second place	1981 Karachi
Silver medal – second place	1982 Amstelveen
Silver medal – second place	1986 Karachi
Bronze medal – third place	1980 Karachi
Bronze medal – third place	1987 Amstelveen
Bronze medal – third place	1988 Lahore

Colin Batch (born 27 March 1958) is a professional international field hockey coach and former international player from Australia. Batch was most recently the head coach of the Kookaburras until he stepped down on the 1st of September 2024. Before he was head coach of the Kookaburras, Batch coached New Zealand's men's team the Black Sticks between 2013 and 2016 and Belgium's men's team the Red Lions from 2010 to 2012. Prior to being a head coach, between 2001 and 2008 Batch was Barry Dancer's assistant coach during the most successful Kookaburras era in their history. During this era Australia broke their Olympic hoodoo winning the gold medal at the 2004 Athens Olympics as well as bronze at the 2008 Beijing Olympics, Silver at the 2002 and 2006 World Cups, Gold at the 2002 and 2006 Commonwealth Games and gold at the 2005 and 2008 Champions Trophies.

== Player ==
Batch competed in 175 international matches for Australia between 1979 and 1990.

=== Playing Achievements ===
Australia:

1979–90 - Australian Team Representative (1987–1988 Vice Captain)

World Cup: Gold: 1986, Bronze: 1982, 1990

Olympic Games: 4th place: 1984, 1988, Boycott: 1980

Champions Trophy: Gold: 1983, 1984, 1985, 1989, Silver: 1981, 1982, 1986, Bronze: 1980, 1987, 1988

Batch held the record for the fastest hat-trick in Champions Trophy history from 1980 to 2009 with an 8-minute hat-trick against the Netherlands in a 7–3 win during the 1980 tournament. The record was beaten in 2009 when Nam Hyun-Woo scored a 7-minute hat-trick to secure Korea a 4–3 win over Spain.

Other

1977–92 - Victorian State Team (National Hockey League, Australia) (1985, 88, 92 Champion) (1985–1992 Captain)

== Coach ==
Batch was the head coach of the Australian Men's national hockey team the Kookaburras for 8 years until he stepped down on Sunday 1 September 2024. He was the head coach of the New Zealand Men's national hockey team the Black Sticks between 2013 and 2016. Prior to this he was the head coach of the Belgium Men's national hockey team the Red Lions from 2010 to 2012. From 2001 to 2008 he was the assistant coach of the Australian Men's national hockey team the Kookaburras.

=== Qualifications ===
FIH Coach (High Performance) 1999

Level 3 Hockey Coach

=== Australian Men's National Coach – Kookaburras 2017–2024 ===
Batch commenced his role as head coach of the Australian Men's national hockey team the Kookaburras in January 2017.

=== New Zealand Men's National Coach – Black Sticks 2012–2016 ===
World League: Silver: 2012–2013

Sultan Azlan Shah Cup Gold: 2015

=== Belgian Men's National Coach – Red Lions 2010–2012 ===
Tournament History – Red Lions

Year	Round	Position
(Belgium) 2011 Men's Hockey Champions Challenge I	Champions	1st
(Belgium) 2011 Men's EuroHockey Nations Championship	Semifinals	4th
(Belgium) 2012 London Olympics	Playoff	5th
Total	1 Title	

Olympic Games: 5th 2012

European Championships: 4th: 2011

Champions Challenge: Gold: 2011

All Star Team: 2011

Batch guided the Red Lions to the 2012 London Olympics through qualification at the 2011 European Championships. In a tournament where the top 4 ranked teams qualified for London, Belgium defied their world ranking to finish 4th in the tournament. Belgium beat 5th world ranked nation Spain in their Pool A match 3–2 which was virtually the decider allowing them to finish second in their pool and set up a semi-final showdown against neighbors Holland. Belgium went down to Holland 4–2 before taking on England in the 3v4 playoff. Belgium lost the bronze medal match in Golden goal extra-time to England 2–1. Beating the 2008 Olympic Silver Medalists in Spain came as no surprise to the Belgian team who are fast improving as they push to become a top ranked nation.

=== Australian Men's National Assistant Coach – Kookaburras 2001–2008 ===
Olympic Games: Gold: 2004, Bronze: 2008

World Cup: Silver: 2002, 2006

Champions Trophy: Gold: 2005, 2008, Silver: 2001, 2003, 2007

Commonwealth Games: Gold: 2002, 2006

=== Other ===
Euro Hockey League

KO08: 2010–11 (KHC Dragons, Belgium)

KHC Dragons experienced success in their first appearance in the EHL. The Dragons went through Round 1.1 undefeated beating German team and 2x EHL champions UHC Hamburg 4–2 to finish 1st in Pool E and take them into the KO16. KHC Dragons’ success continued in the KO16 when they defeated the 2009–10 German champions Rot-Weiss Köln 3–2. KHC Dragons faced Reading HC in their KO8 encounter losing the battle in a shoot-out 2–2 (1–2).

Honour Division Men (Belgium)

Kampioen: 2009–10, 2010–11 (KHC Dragons)

The Dragons formidable record in the Honour Division continued throughout the 2010–11 season with the team from Brasschaat never moving away from the top position of the ladder. With 19 wins, 1 draw, and 2 losses from 22 matches, Dragons went into the finals favorites to retain their title. Dragons won their semi-final series against Watducks ahead of the finals playoff with Racing. Dragons won game one of the three game playoff 3–2 before losing game two 2–4. In game three Dragons defeated Racing 3–3 (4–3 Penalties) to win back-to-back championships.

National Hockey League (Australia)

Champions: 1994 (Queensland), 1995 (Townsville), 1998 (Melbourne)
