= 1986 Men's Hockey Champions Trophy =

Field hockey tournament

Tournament details
- Host country: Pakistan
- City: Karachi
- Dates: 4–11 April
- Teams: 6 (from 3 confederations)

Final positions
- Champions: West Germany (1st title)
- Runner-up: Australia
- Third place: Pakistan

Tournament statistics
- Matches played: 15
- Goals scored: 46 (3.07 per match)
- Top scorer(s): (West Germany) Carsten Fischer (Australia) Mark Hager (Australia) Neil Hawgood (Pakistan) Hassan Sardar (3 goals)

The 1986 Men's Hockey Champions Trophy was the eighth edition of the Hockey Champions Trophy, an international men's field hockey tournament. It took place from 4 to 11 April 1986 in Karachi, Pakistan.

West Germany won their first title by finishing first in the round-robin tournament. Australia, the defending champions, finished second.

== Results ==
Pos	Team	Pld	W	D	L	GF	GA	GD	Pts
1	West Germany	5	3	2	0	10	5	+5	8
2	Australia	5	2	1	2	12	9	+3	5
3	Pakistan (H)	5	1	3	1	7	6	+1	5
4	Great Britain	5	1	3	1	6	6	0	5
5	India	5	2	0	3	6	10	−4	4
6	Netherlands	5	1	1	3	5	10	−5	3

Source: FIH
(H) Hosts

4 April 1986
15:20

Pakistan	1–1	Great Britain
Sardar 64'	Report	Duthie 13'

Umpires:
Rob Lathouwers (NED)
Alexander Stelter (FRG)

4 April 1986
17:20

West Germany	3–0	India
Schmidt-Oppet 24'; Dopp 59'; Hilgers 69'	Report

Umpires:
Roger Webb (ENG)
Don Prior (AUS)

4 April 1986
19:20

Australia	4–1	Netherlands
Mitton 26'; Hager 48'; Reid 64'; Hawgood 69'	Report	T. Kruize 61'

Umpires:
Santiago Deo (ESP)
Shafat Baghdadi (PAK)

5 April 1986
17:20

West Germany	3–2	Australia
Fischer 22', 38'; Reck 45'	Report	Patmore 42'; Batch 64'

Umpires:
Louismichel Gillet (FRA)
Ricardo Lopez (ARG)

5 April 1986
19:20

Netherlands	2–1	Great Britain
T. Kruize 45'; Weterings 69'	Report	Kerly 34'

Umpires:
Walia (IND)
Khizar Bajwa (PAK)

6 April 1986
19:20

Pakistan	2–3	India
Sardar 33'; Qasim 36'	Report	Thoiba Singh 30'; Mohamed 42'; Tikken Singh 48'

Umpires:
Rob Lathouwers (NED)
Alexander Stelter (FRG)

7 April 1986
17:20

Great Britain	1–1	West Germany
Potter 33'	Report	Reck 26'

Umpires:
Louismichel Gillet (FRA)
Don Prior (AUS)

7 April 1986
19:20

India	0–3	Australia
	Report	Hawgood 5'; Birmingham 18'; Hager 45'

Umpires:
Roger Webb (ENG)
Ricardo Lopez (ARG)

8 April 1986
17:20

Pakistan	0–0	Netherlands
	Report

Umpires:
Alexander Stelter (FRA)
Ricardo Lopez (ARG)

8 April 1986
19:20

Australia	2–2	Great Britain
Birmingham 35'; Hawgood 43'	Report	Batchelor 19'; Potter 64'

Umpires:
Louismichel Gillet (FRA)
Rob Lathouwers (NED)

9 April 1986
17:20

Netherlands	1–3	India
J. Kruize 30'	Report	Carvalho 31'; Sharma 39'; P. Singh 40'

Umpires:
Don Prior (AUS)
Shafat Baghdadi (PAK)

9 April 1986
19:20

Pakistan	1–1	West Germany
Sardar 17'	Report	Blöcher 30'

Umpires:
Roger Webb (ENG)
Santiago Deo (ESP)

10 April 1986
15:00

Netherlands	1–2	West Germany
Bovelander 69'	Report	Hilgers 21'; Fischer 31'

Umpires:
Louismichel Gillet (FRA)
Ricardo Lopez (ARG)

10 April 1986
17:20

India	0–1	Great Britain
	Report	Barber 44'

Umpires:
Alexander Stelter (FRG)
Khizar Bajwa (PAK)

11 April 1986
17:00

Pakistan	3–1	Australia
Zia 6'; Sherwani 6'; Farhat 38'	Report	Hager 23'

Umpires:
Rob Lathouwers (NED)
Santiago Deo (ESP)

== Statistics ==
=== Final standings ===
1. West Germany
2. Australia
3. Pakistan
4. Great Britain
5. India
6. Netherlands

=== Goalscorers ===
There were 46 goals scored in 15 matches, for an average of 3.07 goals per match.

3 goals

- (Australia) Mark Hager
- (Australia) Neil Hawgood
- (Pakistan) Hasan Sardar
- (West Germany) Carsten Fischer

2 goals

- (Australia) Warren Birmingham
- (United Kingdom) Jon Potter
- (Netherlands) Ties Kruize
- (Pakistan) Qasim Zia
- (West Germany) Michael Hilgers
- (West Germany) Thomas Reck

1 goal

- (Australia) Colin Batch
- (Australia) Grant Mitton
- (Australia) Nigel Patmore
- (Australia) Graham Reid
- (United Kingdom) Paul Barber
- (United Kingdom) Stephen Batchelor
- (United Kingdom) James Duthie
- (United Kingdom) Sean Kerly
- (India) J. M. Carvalho
- (India) Mohamed Shahid
- (India) Pargat Singh
- (India) Vineet Kumar Sharma
- (India) Thoiba Singh
- (India) Tikken Singh
- (Netherlands) Floris Jan Bovelander
- (Netherlands) Jan Kruize
- (Netherlands) Gijs Weterings
- (Pakistan) Farhat Hassan Khan
- (Pakistan) Saleem Sherwani
- (West Germany) Stefan Blocher
- (West Germany) Heiner Dopp
- (West Germany) Ekkhard Schmidt-Opper

Source: FIH
