= 1980 Men's Hockey Champions Trophy =

Field hockey tournament

Tournament details
- Host country: Pakistan
- City: Karachi
- Dates: 3–11 January
- Teams: 7

Final positions
- Champions: Pakistan (2nd title)
- Runner-up: West Germany
- Third place: Australia

Tournament statistics
- Matches played: 21
- Goals scored: 111 (5.29 per match)
- Top scorer: (Netherlands) Paul Litjens (14 goals)

The 1980 Men's Hockey Champions Trophy was the 2nd edition of the Hockey Champions Trophy, an international men's field hockey tournament. It took place from 3–11 January 1980 in Karachi, Pakistan.

== Results ==
Pos	Team	Pld	W	D	L	GF	GA	GD	Pts
1st place, gold medalist(s)	Pakistan (C, H)	6	6	0	0	32	9	+23	12
2nd place, silver medalist(s)	West Germany	6	4	1	1	25	20	+5	9
3rd place, bronze medalist(s)	Australia	6	2	3	1	19	19	0	7
4	Netherlands	6	3	0	3	22	19	+3	6
5	India	6	1	2	3	17	24	−7	4
6	Spain	6	1	2	3	8	16	−8	4
7	Great Britain	6	0	0	6	12	28	−16	0

Source: FIH
(C) Champions; (H) Hosts

3 January 1980
12:15

Pakistan	7–1	India
Hanif 10', 38', 55'; Manzoor Sr. 28'; Abbas 40', 59'; Kaleemullah 63'	Report	Davinder 24'

Umpires:
Georges van den Berghe (BEL)
Iwo Sakaida

3 January 1980
14:00

Spain	1–2	West Germany
Amat 27'	Report	Blöcher 24'; Peter 49'

Umpires:
Gulasingam Vijayanathan (MAS)
Farooq Qureshi (IND)

3 January 1980
15:45

Great Britain	1–3	Australia
Cattrall 19'	Report	Irvine 23'; Smith 44'; Batch 46'

Umpires:
T Havelock (AUS)
Bazeed A Khan (PAK)

4 January 1980
11:00

Pakistan	5–1	Spain
Manzoor 6'; Rasool 17'; S. Khan 25', 62'; K. Khan 56'	Report	Amat 67'

Umpires:
T Havelock (AUS)
Georges van den Berghe (BEL)

4 January 1980
14:00

India	3–3	Australia
Surj. Singh 6', 18'; Iqbal 39'	Report	Irvine 9'; Charlesworth 46'; Colledge 52'

Umpires:
Iwo Sakaida (JPN)
Adriano de Vecchi (ITA)

4 January 1980
15:45

Netherlands	4–1	Great Britain
Litjens 25', 39'; T. Kruize 41'; Bouwman 52'	Report	Gregg 5'

Umpires:
Gulasingam Vijayanathan (MAS)
Safarazuddin (PAK)

5 January 1980
15:45

Netherlands	4–6	West Germany
T. Kruize 4'; Litjens 7', 44'	Report	Strödter 9', 34', 48'; Krull 29'; Peter 37'

Umpires:
Akhtar Ali Khan (PAK)
Louismichel Gillet (FRA)

6 January 1980
12:15

Spain	2–2	India
Genesca 24', 56'	Report	D. Singh 34'; Grewal 52'

Umpires:
Gulasingam Vijayanathan (MAS)
Alain Renaud (FRA)

6 January 1980
14:00

Pakistan	7–1	Australia
S. Khan 6', 45', 61'; Munawar 16', 35+'; Manzoor 63'; A. Khan 67'	Report	Walsh 47'

Umpires:
Louismichel Gillet (FRA)
Adriano de Vecchi (ITA)

6 January 1980
15:45

West Germany	7–5	Great Britain
Peter 13'; Trump 19'	Report	Cattrall 6', 8', 28'

Umpires:
T Havelock (AUS)
Farooq Qureshi (IND)

7 January 1980
14:00

Great Britain	1–2	Spain
Cattrall 43'	Report	Coghen 58', 69'

Umpires:
Iwo Sakaida (JPN)
Sarfarazuddin (PAK)

7 January 1980
15:45

India	2–5	Netherlands
Iqbal 27'; Grewal 32'	Report	Litjens 10', 22', 39'; Van 't Hek 55'; Bouwman 67'

Umpires:
Alain Renaud (FRA)
Georges van den Berghe (BEL)

8 January 1980
14:00

Pakistan	4–2	West Germany
K. Khan 27', 42'; A. Khan 29'; Manzoor 56'	Report	Blöcher 11'; Strödter 63'

Umpires:
Alain Renaud (FRA)
Iwo Sakaida (JPN)

8 January 1980
15:45

Netherlands	3–6	Australia
Litjens 1', 33', 62'	Report	Riley 18', 49'; Irvine 35+'; Boyce 50'; Batch 51', 57'

Umpires:
Louismichel Gillet (FRA)
Bazeed A Khan (PAK)

9 January 1980
12:15

Pakistan	6–1	Great Britain
Abbas 9', 45'; K. Khan 23'; Manzoor 42'	Report	Cattrall 7'

Umpires:
Gulasingam Vijayanathan (MAS)
Adriano de Vecchi (ITA)

9 January 1980
14:00

West Germany	4–3	India
Strödter 2', 63'; Schmidt-Opper 7'; Blöcher 66'	Report	Grewal 17', 23'; D. Singh 70+'

Umpires:
Louismichel Gillet (FRA)
T Havelock (AUS)

9 January 1980
15:45

Australia	2–2	Spain
Charlesworth 23'; Riley 69'	Report	Coghen 1'; Garralda 2'

Umpires:
Akhtar Ali Khan (PAK)
Georges van den Berghe (BEL)

10 January 1980
14:00

India	6–3	Great Britain
Iqbal 28'; Grewal 32', ?'; Davinder Singh ?', ?'; Baskaran ?'	Report	Cattrall 28', 32'; Hughes ?'

Umpires:
Iwo Sakaida (JPN)
Alain Renaud (FRA)

10 January 1980
15:45

Netherlands	4–0	Spain
Leefers 10'; Litjens 27', 41'; Van Asbeck 43'	Report

Umpires:
Louismichel Gillet (FRA)
Adriano de Vecchi (ITA)

11 January 1980
11:00

Australia	3–3	West Germany
Irvine 3', 24'; Bell 8'	Report	Peter 12', 55', 59'

Umpires:
Gulasingam Vijayanathan (MAS)
Louismichel Gillet (FRA)

11 January 1980
15:00

Pakistan	3–2	Netherlands
A. Khan 10'; Manzoor 40'; Abbas 67'	Report	Litjens 30', 41'

Umpires:
Alain Renaud (FRA)
Georges van den Berghe (BEL)

== Final standings ==
1. Pakistan
2. West Germany
3. Australia
4. Netherlands
5. India
6. Spain
7. Great Britain
