= 1978 Men's Hockey Champions Trophy =

Tournament details
- Host country: Pakistan
- City: Lahore
- Dates: 17–24 November
- Teams: 5

Final positions
- Champions: Pakistan (1st title)
- Runner-up: Australia
- Third place: Great Britain

Tournament statistics
- Matches played: 10
- Goals scored: 49 (4.9 per match)
- Top scorer(s): (Pakistan) Hanif Khan (5 goals)

The 1978 Men's Hockey Champions Trophy was the 1st edition of the Hockey Champions Trophy, an international men's field hockey tournament. It took place from 17 to 24 November 1978 in Lahore, Pakistan.

== Tournament ==
=== Final table ===
Pos	Team	Pld	W	D	L	GF	GA	GD	Pts
1st place, gold medalist(s)	Pakistan (C, H)	4	4	0	0	15	5	+10	8
2nd place, silver medalist(s)	Australia	4	2	1	1	9	7	+2	5
3rd place, bronze medalist(s)	Great Britain	4	2	0	2	9	10	−1	4
4	New Zealand	4	1	0	3	9	12	−3	2
5	Spain	4	0	1	3	7	15	−8	1

Source: FIH
(C) Champions; (H) Hosts

=== Results ===
17 November 1978

Pakistan	6–2	New Zealand
Sheikh 3 goals' Akhtar Rasool; H. Khan		Ineson; Maister

18 November 1978

Great Britain	3–1	New Zealand
Gregg 5', 29'; Cattrall 55'		Patel 47'

18 November 1978

Australia	4–2	Spain

20 November 1978

Pakistan	3–1	Spain
Manzoor Sr. Akhtar Rasool; Siddique		Rocka

20 November 1978

Australia	1–1	Great Britain
Cooke 55'	Report	Cattrall 28'

21 November 1978

Pakistan	4–1	Great Britain

21 November 1978

New Zealand	4–0	Spain

23 November 1978

Great Britain	4–4	Spain

23 November 1978

Australia	3–2	New Zealand

24 November 1978

Pakistan	2–1	Australia
Sheikh; Manzoor Jr.		Dick

=== Winning squad ===
Pakistan

- Saeed Ahmed
- Munir Bhatti
- Rana Ehsnaullah
- Manzoor Sr.
- Manzoor Jr.
- Hanif Khan
- Samiullah Khan
- Saeed Khan
- Nasim Mirza
- Zia Qamar
- Akhtar Rasool
- Muhammad Shafiq
- Shahnaz Sheikh
- Saleem Sherwani
- Islahuddin Siddique (Capt)
- Munawwaruz Zaman
