= Mansoor Ahmed =

Pakistani field hockey player

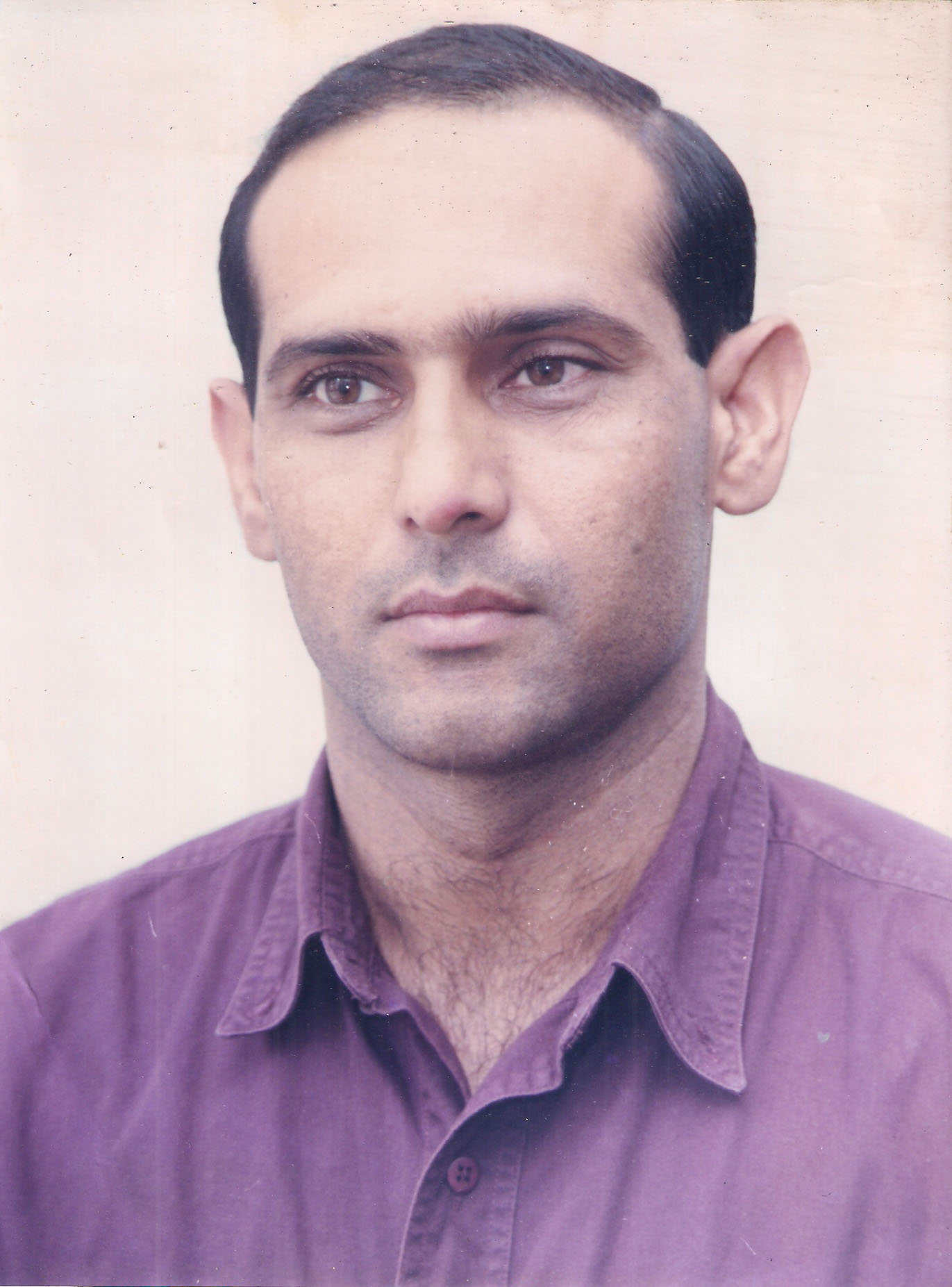

Personal information
- Nationality: Pakistani
- Born: 7 January 1968 Karachi
- Died: 12 May 2018 (aged 50) Karachi

Sport
- Sport: field hockey
Medal record
Men's field hockey
Olympic Games
Bronze medal – third place	1992 Barcelona	Team competition
Hockey World Cup
Silver medal – second place	1990 Lahore	Team Competition
Gold medal – first place	1994 Sydney	Team Competition
Hockey Junior World Cup
Bronze medal – third place	1985 Vancouver	Team competition
Bronze medal – third place	1989 Ipoh	Team competition
Asian Games
Gold medal – first place	1990 Beijing	Team competition
Silver medal – second place	1986 Seongnam	Team competition
Hockey Champions Trophy
Silver medal – second place	1996 Madras	Team Competition
Gold medal – first place	1994 Lahore	Team competition
Bronze medal – third place	1992 Karachi	Team competition
Silver medal – second place	1988 Lahore	Team competition
Indira Gandhi Gold Cup
Gold medal – first place	1988	Team competition
Gold medal – first place	1989	Team Competition
Hockey Asia Cup
Gold medal – first place	1989 New Delhi	Team Competition

Mansoor Ahmed Batt (7 January 1968 – 12 May 2018) was a field hockey player and captain of the Pakistan national hockey team.

== Career ==
Ahmed played as a goalkeeper and captain for the Pakistan national hockey team from 1986 to 2000. He played 338 international matches and participated in three editions of the Summer Olympic Games. He won a bronze medal in the 1992 Olympic Games. Ahmed played three consecutive World Cups and won the 1994 World Cup Hockey Championship (World Cup). He also won the silver medal in the 1990 World Cup Hockey Championship. He played 10 Champions Trophy games and won gold medal in 1994. He played three Asian Games and won the hockey gold medal in the 1990 edition at Beijing, China. In his career, he earned 12 gold, 12 silver and 8 bronze medals in international hockey tournaments.

He was named as a member of the All Asian Stars Hockey Team in 1996 and of the World Eleven Hockey team in 1994. Ahmed was declared four times as the best goalkeeper of the tournament in his career. He was also the flag carrier of the Pakistani contingent at the 1996 Atlanta Olympics.

For his outstanding services to field hockey, the Government of Pakistan awarded him the President Award in 1988. He was also awarded the Pride of Performance by the President of Pakistan in 1994.

Ahmed was also involved in hockey as a coach. He was the national hockey coach of the Pakistan junior hockey team in 2000 and was appointed as specialist goalkeeper coach of Bangladesh national hockey team in 2014. He also was appointed director of Pakistan Hockey Federation's hockey academies in 2010. Besides being a player, Ahmed was a social activist and worked as an ambassador with different organizations like "Right to Play" and "Athlete Ambassador". He was also appointed as an ambassador for 'No Smoking Campaign' by the Government of Pakistan. He had the honour to be announced as speaker for FIFA World Cup 2022, Qatar. He was also invited as a guest for Special Olympics World Games, Los Angeles, US in 2015.

== Illness and death ==
On 22 April 2018, Ahmed revealed that he needed a heart transplant and was seeking a medical visa from the Government of India. He was under treatment at the National Institute of Cardiovascular Diseases in Karachi.

Mansoor Ahmed died on 12 May 2018, in Karachi, Pakistan. In the last three years of his life, he had been suffering from a heart ailment. A few weeks before his death, Ahmed had complications originating from a pacemaker and stents implanted in his heart. On 13 May 2018, he was laid to rest in Karachi.

== See also ==
- Pakistan Hockey Federation
