= Shahbaz Ahmed =

Pakistani hockey player

Shahbaz Ahmad
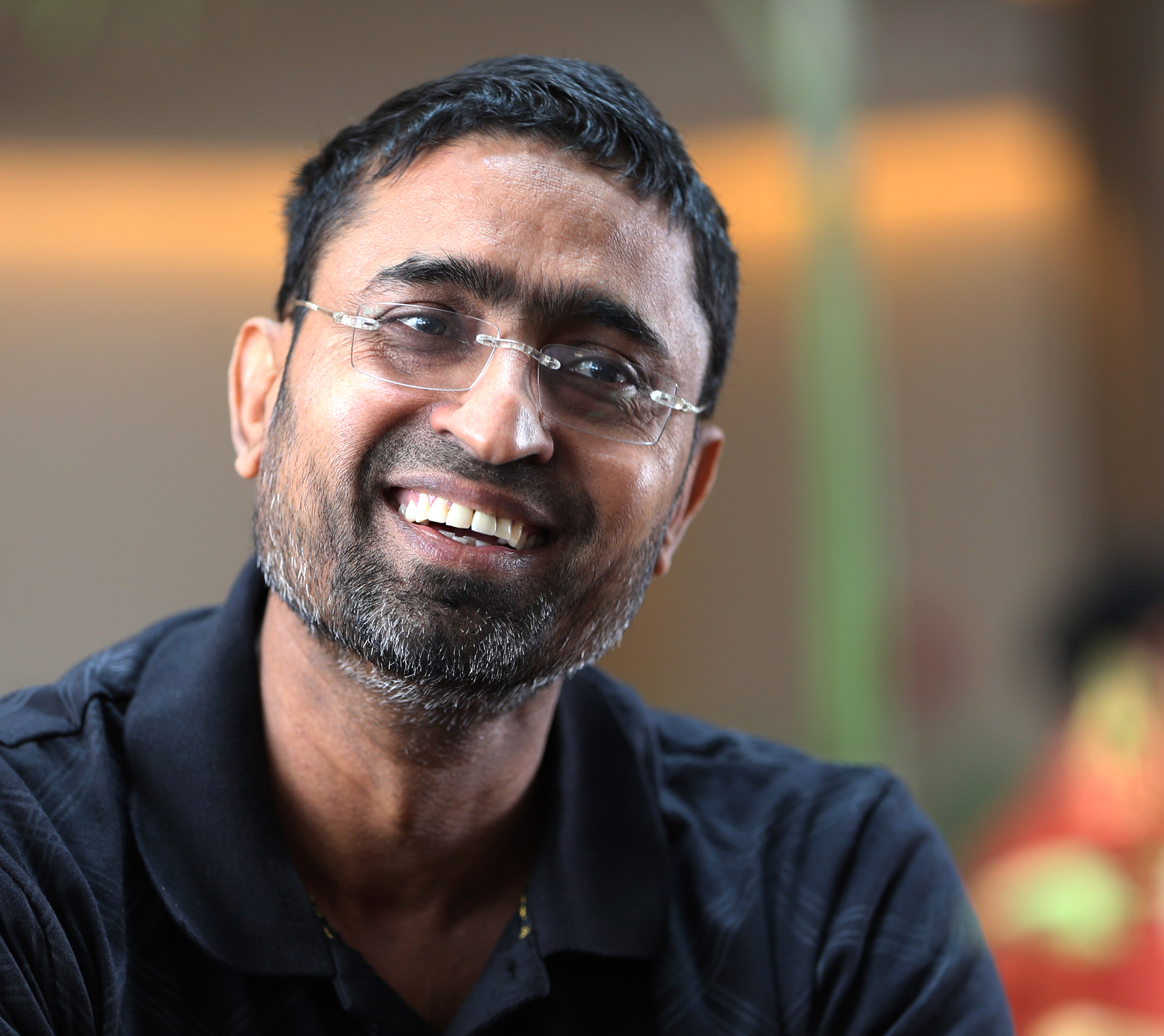

Personal information
- Born: 1 September 1968 (age 57) Faisalabad

Sport
- Sport: Field hockey
Coaching career
- Years: Team
- 2022: Monarch Padma (mentor)
Medal record
Men's field hockey
Representing Pakistan
World Cup
Gold medal – first place	1994 Sydney
Olympic Games
Bronze medal – third place	1992 Barcelona	Team

Shahbaz Ahmad (Urdu: شہباز احمد) (born 1 September 1968) is a former field hockey player from Pakistan who is also known by his nickname 'Shahbaz Senior'. He was born to an Arain family.

== Career ==
He is considered to be among the best forwards in the history of field hockey. He was called up to the Pakistan national hockey team in 1986, and was captain of the national side, that led his team to the 1994 Men's Hockey World Cup victory. "He played a major role in Pakistan victories in 1994 World Cup in Sydney, Australia and Champions Trophy 1994 in Lahore, Pakistan." After the Atlanta Games in 1996, he played for Dutch club Oranje Zwart and for German club Harvestehuder THC from Hamburg for a couple of years.

Called the Maradona of Hockey, he has represented Pakistan in the Champions Trophy tournaments in 1986, 1987, 1988, 1989; 3rd Asia Cup, New Delhi 1989; 7th Hockey World Cup, 1990 in Lahore, BMW Trophy Amsterdam, 1990, 11th Asian Games Beijing, 1990, 12th Champions Trophy, Melbourne and the 1994 Hockey World Cup, Sydney. He made his world-famous run down against Australia in the same tournament. "But in 1994, at the Sydney World Cup, in the pool match between Australia and Pakistan, Australia had a similar free hit just outside the Pakistan circle which was intercepted and moved onto Pakistan's Shahbaz who then executed his famous run with Australia's Ken Wark chasing him. Shahbaz drew a covering defender and reverse-sticked the ball to Kamran Ashraf, who scored." "Twenty years have passed, but the memories of his breathtaking runs against Australia, Germany and the Netherlands are etched in memories of millions."

He played at three Olympic Games, winning a bronze medal in 1992.

Shahbaz Ahmad was declared the best player at the 7th Hockey World Cup, Lahore, 1990, and received the BMW Trophy, Amsterdam, 1990. He has won gold medals in the 3rd Asia Cup, New Delhi, 1989; Gold Medal Asian Games, Beijing, 1990; Gold Medal 1994 Champions Trophy Lahore, Gold Medal 1994 World Cup, Sydney, silver medal in Champions Trophy, 1988; 7th World Cup, Lahore, 1990; BMW Trophy, Amsterdam, 1990; and a bronze medal in the 8th Champions Trophy, 1986. He was awarded the best player award in 1994 World Cup Sydney as well. He played in the 1998 and 2002 Men's Hockey World Cup not as captain but as a player.

== Awards and recognition ==
Shahbaz Ahmad is regarded as one of the best forwards in the game for his agility, body dodge and ball control. He is the only player in the history of field hockey to win two consecutive 'Player of the Tournament' awards in the 1990 World Cup in Lahore, and at the 1994 World Cup in Sydney. He leads the list of most-capped Pakistanis with 304 caps (a total of 304 games) in international field hockey.

- He was decorated with Hilal-i-Pakistan (Crescent of Pakistan) Award by the President of Pakistan.
- In recognition of his outstanding contribution in the field of hockey, he was awarded the President's Pride of Performance Award in 1992 by the Government of Pakistan.
- In 2002, Shahbaz Ahmed retired from playing the game of field hockey for good. In 2010, Shahbaz was district manager of Pakistan International Airlines (PIA) in Saudi Arabia.
- In 2015, he was appointed Secretary General of Pakistan Hockey Federation.

== See also ==
- Pakistan Hockey Federation
