= 1989 Men's Hockey Asia Cup =

Field hockey competition

Tournament details
- Host country: India
- City: New Delhi
- Dates: 20–28 December
- Teams: 7 (from 1 confederation)

Final positions
- Champions: Pakistan (3rd title)
- Runner-up: India
- Third place: South Korea

Tournament statistics
- Matches played: 15
- Goals scored: 61 (4.07 per match)

The 1989 Men's Hockey Asia Cup was the third edition of the Men's Hockey Asia Cup, the quadrennial international men's field hockey championship of Asia organized by the Asian Hockey Federation. It was held from 20 to 28 December 1989 in New Delhi, India.

The two-time defending champions Pakistan won the tournament for a third consecutive time by defeating the hosts India 2–0 in the final. South Korea won the bronze medal by defeating Japan 2–0.

== Preliminary round ==
All times are (UTC+5:30).

=== Group A ===
Pos	Team	Pld	W	D	L	GF	GA	GD	Pts	Qualification
1	Pakistan	2	2	0	0	6	0	+6	4	Semi-finals
2	Japan	2	1	0	1	3	4	−1	2	Semi-finals
3	Malaysia	2	0	0	2	2	7	−5	0	

Source: TheSports.org

20 December 1989

Pakistan	2–0	Japan
Saeed 5'; Qamar 18'	Report

22 December 1989

Japan	3–1	Malaysia

24 December 1989

Pakistan	4–1	Malaysia
Bhopali 16'; Shahbaz Sr. 37'; Bashir 42', 57'	Report	Zaini 21'

=== Group B ===
Pos	Team	Pld	W	D	L	GF	GA	GD	Pts	Qualification
1	India (H)	3	3	0	0	12	0	+12	6	Semi-finals
2	South Korea	3	2	0	1	11	6	+5	4	Semi-finals
3	China	3	1	0	2	7	6	+1	2	
4	Bangladesh	3	0	0	3	1	19	−18	0	

Source: TheSports.org
(H) Hosts

20 December 1989

China	6–1	Bangladesh

20 December 1989

India	5–0	South Korea

22 December 1989

South Korea	7–0	Bangladesh

22 December 1989

India	1–0	China

24 December 1989

India	6–0	Bangladesh
Mascarenhas 6'; Pargat Singh 12', 58'; Jagdev Singh 35'; Felix 47'; Pillay 68'	Report

24 December 1989

South Korea	4–1	China
Jung-hwan 22', 35'; Shin-huem 50'; Seon-yong 52'	Report	Wang 68'

== Classification round ==
=== Fifth to eight place classification ===
Crossover
26 December 1989
Bye
China
26 December 1989
Bangladesh	0
Malaysia	4

Fifth place
28 December 1989
China	2
Malaysia	1
Seventh place
Bangladesh
Bye

==== First to fourth place classification ====
Semi-finals
26 December 1989
Japan	0
India	3
26 December 1989
Pakistan	8
South Korea	4

Final
28 December 1989
Pakistan	2
India	0
Third place
28 December 1989
South Korea	1
Japan	0

==== Semi-finals ====
26 December 1989

Japan	0–3	India
	Report	Balwinder 13'; Pargat 27'; Thoiba 28'

26 December 1989

Pakistan	3–3 (a.e.t.)	South Korea
Bashir 53'; Mohib 68', 78'	Report	Shin-huem 24'; Seon-jong 35'; Jung-hwan 80'
Penalties
	8–4

==== Third place game ====
28 December 1989

South Korea	1–0	Japan

==== Final ====
28 December 1989

Pakistan	2–0	India
Shahbaz Sr. 29'; Bhopali 64'	Report

== Winners ==
1989 Men's Hockey Asia Cup winners

Pakistan
Third title

== Final standings ==
1. Pakistan
2. India
3. South Korea
4. Japan
5. China
6. Malaysia
7. Bangladesh

== See also ==
- 1989 Women's Hockey Asia Cup
