= Farhat Hassan Khan =

Pakistani field hockey player

Medal record

Men's field hockey

Representing Pakistan

Olympic Games
Bronze medal – third place	1992 Barcelona	Team

Farhat Hassan Khan (Urdu: فرحت حسن خان; born 10 January 1965) is a Pakistani retired field hockey player.

He was a member of the Pakistan team that became the Asian champions at the 1990 Asian Games, winning the gold medal after downing India in the final, and a bronze medal at the 1992 Summer Olympics in Barcelona.

He also served briefly as the head coach and manager of the Pakistan men's national feild hockey team and Pakistan women's national field hockey team from July to December 2017. He cited personal reasons for resigning. The team had suffered some disappointing losses before he left, but former head coach Manzoor-ul Hassan commented that Farhat Khan had been a good player but should not have been appointed head coach due to his lack of coaching experience, and that the national team was "already in complete disarray" when he stepped in. Hassan Sardar replaced him as head coach of the national team.
