= Safdar Abbas =

Field hockey player

Personal information
- Born: 27 July 1957 (age 69) Karachi, Pakistan

Sport
- Sport: Field hockey
- Position: Left-winger
National team
Years	Team	Caps	Goals
1973-1981	Pakistan	56	(22)
Honours
Representing Pakistan
Hockey World Cup
(Malaysia) 1975 (silver) Runner-up
Hockey Champions Trophy
(Pakistan) 1980 (gold) Champion
- Updated on 4 October 2021

Safdar Abbas (Urdu: صفدر عباس) is a former professional field hockey player from Pakistan who represented the Pakistan national field hockey team as a forward. Abbas is the youngest player to represent Pakistan at the age of sixteen years in 1973.

== Early life ==
Safdar Abbas was born in Karachi in 1957. He started playing hockey at the Habib Public School in Karachi. He was a student of ninth grade in the school when he was called for the national team camp in 1973.

== Career ==
After the 1972 Munich Olympics where Pakistan lost the final to West Germany many Pakistani players were banned because of their behavior and protest over umpiring decisions in the game. Abbas was one the new players inducted into the team for the tour of Spain and Belgium in lead up to the 1973 Hockey World Cup in Amstelveen where Pakistan was defending the title. During the World Cup Abbas scored a goal in the match against Argentina at the age of sixteen years in the last pool match of the tournament. Pakistan eventually finished fourth.

Abbas was dropped from the squad for the 1974 Asian Games but was part of the squad for the 1975 World Cup in Malaysia. Pakistan lost the final to India and finished second in the tournament. Abbas was a skillful forward with powerful hitting on the ball and ball control but he had temperamental issues and would often quarrel with opposition players and sometimes with his own teammates, he was dropped from the squad for the 1976 Olympics and 1978 World Cup.

In 1979 he was recalled into the team for the Esanda International Tournament in Melbourne. Pakistan won the tournament defeating Australia in the final with Abbas scoring Pakistan's third goal to give them the lead in the 4–2 victory. He accompanied the team for the tour of Egypt and Netherlands later in the year.

In 1980 he scored five goals in Pakistan's successful defence of their title in the second Hockey Champions Trophy at Karachi. His final appearance for the national team was in the 1981 Hockey Champions Trophy at Karachi after which he announced his retirement.

== Personal life ==
Safdar Abbas is the uncle of Sohail Abbas, the former Pakistan international with highest goals in international hockey with 348 goals. According to Sohail Abbas he was inspired by his uncle Safdar to play hockey as a youngster. Safdar's brother also played first-class cricket in Pakistan. His son Mudassar Abbas also played professional hockey in Pakistan before he moved to Australia to play league hockey where he was selected for the Australian Masters Hockey team, he is also a qualified fitness trainer in Melbourne.
