= Rajinder Singh Jr. =

Field hockey player

Personal information
- Full name: Rajinder Singh Chauhan
- Nickname: Raj
- Nationality: India
- Born: 13 May 1959 (age 67) Sarih, Punjab, India

Sport
- Country: India
- Sport: Field hockey
- Event: Men's team
- Club: Punjab & Sindh Bank
Medal record
Representing India
Asian Games
Silver medal – second place	1982 Delhi	Team
Champions Trophy
Bronze medal – third place	1982 Amstelveen
Sultan Azlan Shah Cup
Silver medal – second place	1983 Kuala Lumpur

Rajinder Singh Chauhan, also known as Rajinder Singh Jr., is an Indian field hockey player and coach. He was part of the Indian teams that won the silver medal at the 1982 Asian Games, the bronze medal at the 1982 Champions Trophy, and the silver medal at the 1983 Sultan Azlan Shah Cup. He coached the Indian women's team in 2004 and the Indian men's team in 2005-2006.

He was awarded the Maharaja Ranjit Singh Award in 1984, the Dhyan Chand Award in 2005 and the Dronacharya Award in 2011.

== Early life ==
Rajinder Singh Jr. was born on 13 May 1959 in Sarih village of Indian Punjab. He played field hockey for Punjab in the Indian Senior National Hockey Championship.

== Coaching career ==
- 2004: Chief coach India women's team.
- 2005-2006: Coach India men's team.

== Honours and awards ==
- Maharaja Ranjit Singh Award (Punjab, 1984)
- Dhyan Chand Award (2005)
- Dronacharya Award (2011)
