= Maqsood Hussain (field hockey) =

Pakistani field hockey player

Maqsood Hussain (born 10 April 1962, in Sialkot), is a Pakistani field hockey player. He represented the Pakistan national team 38 times between 1981 and 1987, scoring 21 goals. He is the brother of Pakistan field hockey Captain Manzoor Hussain Junior. Maqsood Hussain and his two brothers, Manzoor Hussain Junior and Mahmood Hussain, represented Pakistan in 1984 Champions Trophy in Karachi in a match and made world record.
