= Nasir Ali (field hockey) =

Pakistani field hockey player (born 1959)

Medal record

Men's field hockey

Representing Pakistan

Olympic Games
Gold medal – first place	1984 Los Angeles	Team

Hockey World Cup
Gold medal – first place	1982 Mumbai	Team

Asian Games
Gold medal – first place	1982 New Delhi	Team
Silver medal – second place	1986 Seoul	Team

Asia Cup
Gold medal – first place	1982 Karachi	Team
Gold medal – first place	1985 Dhaka	Team

Champions Trophy
Silver medal – second place	1983 Karachi	Team
Silver medal – second place	1984 Karachi	Team
Bronze medal – third place	1986 Karachi	Team

Nasir Ali (born 1 January 1959 in Sialkot) is a Pakistani field hockey player. He played at full-back position. He was a player in the national hockey team from 1981 to 1988 during which he played 150 matches for his country and scored 19 goals. He also remained captain of Pakistan national hockey team.

He was a member of Pakistan's Gold Medal-winning field hockey team at the 1984 Los Angeles Olympics. Later, he was captain of the Pakistan field hockey team which finished 5th in the 1988 Seoul Olympics. He was capped 150 times and scored 19 goals.
