= Saleem Sherwani (field hockey forward) =

Pakistani field hockey player (born 1962)

Personal information
- Born: 21 June 1962 (age 64) Vehari, Punjab, Pakistan
- Height: 168 cm (5 ft 6 in)
- Weight: 58 kg (128 lb)
Medal record
Men's field hockey
Representing Pakistan
Olympic Games
Gold medal – first place	1984 Los Angeles	Team

Saleem Sherwani (Urdu: ﺳﻠﯿﻢ ﺷﻴﺮوﺍﻧﻰ; born 21 June 1962) is a former field hockey player from Pakistan. He won a gold medal with the Men's National Hockey Team at the 1984 Summer Olympics in Los Angeles, California. He was born in Vehari, Punjab, Pakistan.

== See also ==
- Pakistan Hockey Federation
