= Ayaz Mahmood =

Pakistani field hockey player

Medal record

Men's field hockey

Representing Pakistan

Olympic Games
Gold medal – first place	1984 Los Angeles	Team competition

Asian Games
Silver medal – second place	1986 Seoul	Team competition

Ayaz Mahmood (born May 24, 1964) is a former field hockey player, coach and Olympic champion for Pakistan. Born in Karachi, Pakistan, he has been a known center-halfs for Pakistan and won the field hockey gold medal in the 1984 Los Angeles Olympics.

Ayaz Mahmood started his career in 1980 and represented Pakistan until 1988. During his career the Pakistan team won many events with a Gold, Silver & Bronze medals. After his retirement from his hockey career he has been affiliated with Pakistan Hockey Federation as a coach for Pakistan's Junior and Senior teams. Currently, he is one of the selectors for Pakistan hockey team.

Ayaz Mahmood's father Mahmood-ul Hassan also represented Pakistan internationally and was a member of Pakistan's hockey team at the country's two first Olympics – the 1948 Summer Olympics and the 1952 Summer Olympics.
