= Neil Hawgood =

Australian field hockey player (born 1962)

Neil Hawgood (born 12 July 1962) is a former Australian field hockey player who represented Australia at the 1988 Summer Olympics. He played in 7 games, scoring five goals, as the Australian team finished in fourth position.

Since his retirement as a player, he has become a coach, including stints in London, Scotland, Queensland and Western Australia.

He has been named India women's national field hockey team, he coached Indian junior women's team which won bronze at 2013 junior world cup. He was the National team coach until 2016 Summer Olympics.
