= Anjum Saeed =

Pakistani field hockey player (born 1968)

Personal information
- Born: 11 August 1968 (age 57)

Sport
- Country: Pakistan
- Sport: Field hockey
Medal record
Men's field hockey}
Representing Pakistan
Olympic Games
Bronze medal – third place	1992 Barcelona	Team

Anjum Saeed (born 11 August 1968) is a Pakistani former field hockey player. He was a member of Pakistan's Asian champion team that won the gold medal at the 1990 Asian Games, beating India 3–2 in the final, and a bronze medal at the 1992 Summer Olympics in Barcelona.
