= Ishtiaq Ahmed (field hockey) =

Pakistani field hockey player (born 1962)

Medal record

Men's field hockey

Representing Pakistan

Olympic Games
| Gold medal – first place | 1984 Los Angeles | Team |

Ishtiaq Ahmed (born 20 December 1962) is a Pakistani field hockey player. He was born in Sheikhupura. He won a gold medal at the 1984 Summer Olympics in Los Angeles.
