= Peter Haselhurst =

Australian field hockey player

Personal information
- Born: 13 July 1957 (age 68)

Sport
- Sport: Field hockey

Achievements and titles
- Olympic finals: 1984 Summer Olympics
Medal record
Men's field hockey
Representing Australia
World Hockey Cup
Gold medal – first place	1986 London	Team

Peter Haselhurst (born 13 July 1957) is an Australian field hockey player. He competed at the 1984 Summer Olympics in Los Angeles, where the Australian team placed fourth. He became world champion with Australia in 1986.
