= Manzoor Hussain (field hockey) =

Pakistani field hockey player (1958–2022)

Personal information
- Born: 28 October 1958 Sialkot, Punjab, Pakistan
- Died: 29 August 2022 (aged 63) Lahore, Punjab, Pakistan
Medal record
Men's field hockey
Representing Pakistan
Olympic Games
Bronze medal – third place	1976 Montreal	Team
Gold medal – first place	1984 Los Angeles	Team
Hockey World Cup
Silver medal – second place	1975 Kuala Lumpur	Team
Gold medal – first place	1978 Buenos Aires	Team
Gold medal – first place	1982 Mumbai	Team
Asian Games
Gold medal – first place	1978 Bangkok	Team
Gold medal – first place	1982 New Delhi	Team
Asia Cup
Gold medal – first place	1982 Karachi	Team
Champions Trophy
Gold medal – first place	1978 Lahore	Team
Gold medal – first place	1980 Karachi	Team
Junior World Cup
Gold medal – first place	1979 Versailles	Team

Manzoor Hussain (28 October 1958 – 29 August 2022), better known as Manzoor Junior, was a Pakistani field hockey player.

Manzoor Hussain played in a forward position as a striker between 1975 and 1984 and was capped 175 times with 86 goals to his credit.

Manzoor was part of the Pakistan team that won the bronze medal in the 1976 Olympics in Montreal. Eight years later, he was captain of the Pakistan team that won the gold medal at the 1984 Olympics in Los Angeles.

Manzoor was also a member of the Pakistan team that won the World Cup in 1978 and 1982. He was known for his exceptional stick work, and one of its remarkable displays was in the 1982 World Cup final where he scored the goal by dodging six German defenders.

Manzoor Hussain and his two brothers, Maqsood Hussain and Mahmood Hussain represented Pakistan in the 1984 Men's Hockey Champions Trophy in Karachi in a match.

== Awards and recognition ==
- Pride of Performance Award in 1984 by the President of Pakistan.

== See also ==
- Pakistan Hockey Federation
