= Kaleemullah Khan (field hockey) =

Pakistani field hockey player

Medal record

Men's field hockey

Representing Pakistan

Olympic Games
Gold medal – first place	1984 Los Angeles	Team

Kaleemullah Khan (also spelled Kalimulla; born 2 January 1958 in Bahawalpur) is a field hockey player from Pakistan. His brother Samiullah Khan, is also an award-winning hockey player.

A forward, Kaleemullah played between 1979 and 1986. He was capped 176 times with 97 goals. He was instrumental in Pakistan winning the Gold medal at the 1984 Summer Olympics. It was Kaleemullah whose winning goal, in extra time, handed Pakistan victory in the 1984 Olympics final. He was also a key member of the Pakistan hockey team that won Gold in both the 1982 World Cup and the Asian Games, and scored goals in the final matches at both events.

== Awards and recognition ==
Kaleemullah Khan received the Pride of Performance Award by the President of Pakistan in 1984.

== See also ==
- Pakistan Hockey Federation
