= Michael Peter =

German field hockey player

Personal information
- Born: 7 May 1949 Heidelberg, Baden-Württemberg
- Died: 23 October 1997 (aged 48) Leimen, Baden-Württemberg
- Height: 185 cm (6 ft 1 in)
- Weight: 70 kg (154 lb)

Sport
- Sport: Field hockey
Medal record
Men's field hockey
Representing West Germany
Olympic Games
Gold medal – first place	1972 Munich	Team competition
Silver medal – second place	1984 Los Angeles	Team competition

Michael Peter (7 May 1949 – 23 October 1997) was a field hockey player from West Germany, who captained the West German team that won the gold medal at the 1972 Summer Olympics in Munich.

Twelve years later, at age 35, he was a member of the squad that won the silver medal at the 1984 Summer Olympics in Los Angeles, California. He was born in Heidelberg, Baden-Württemberg.
