= Qasim Zia =

Pakistani field hockey player

Personal information
- Born: 7 August 1961 (age 64) Lahore, Punjab, Pakistan
Medal record
Men's field hockey
Representing Pakistan
Olympic Games
Gold medal – first place	1984 Los Angeles	Team competition

Qasim Zia (born 7 August 1961) is a Pakistani politician and former field hockey player. He was appointed as president, Pakistan Hockey Federation in October 2008.

He was a member of the Provincial Assembly of the Punjab, Pakistan during 2002–07 and functioned as the Leader of Opposition. He was returned to the Punjab Assembly for the second consecutive term in the bye-elections in 2008. He has extensively travelled abroad. His granduncle, Mian Amiruddin, and his cousin, Khawaja Tariq Rahim, had served as Governors of Punjab. His grandfather, Mian Aminuddin, was the first Mayor of Lahore. His uncle, Mian Salahuddin remained MNA and Provincial Minister and his cousin, Mian Yousuf Salahuddin, served as a Member of the Punjab Assembly during 1988–90.

Qasim Zia was appointed as the 23rd president of the Pakistan Hockey Federation (PHF) by Prime Minister Yousuf Raza Gillani on 15 October 2008.

== Personal life ==
Qasim Zia got married in November 1986 and has three children. He belongs to the well-known Mian family of Baghbanpura, Lahore and is the grandson of veteran Pakistani politician and former Governor of Punjab, Pakistan, Mian Aminuddin who also had served as the first Mayor of Lahore after the independence of Pakistan in 1947. His cousin Mian Yousuf Salahuddin is a PTV producer and had also served as Member of Punjab Assembly in Pakistan from 1988 to 1990.

He was educated at the Aitchison College, Lahore.

== Awards and recognition ==
Keeping in view his services to Pakistan Hockey and his 25 years of services to Pakistani politics, the President of Pakistan awarded Sitara-e-Imtiaz to him in 2014.

Before that, he had received a Pride of Performance Award for Sports from the President of Pakistan in 2011.

== Political career ==
=== Pakistan Peoples Party (Parliamentarian) Punjab ===
- Information Secretary (1997–2001)
- President (2001–2007)
- Member CEC PPP Central (2007–present)
