= Samiullah Khan (field hockey) =

Pakistani field hockey player

Personal information
- Born: 6 September 1951 (age 74) Bahawalpur, Pakistan

Sport
- Sport: Field hockey
- Position: Played left winger position
Medal record
Men's field hockey
Representing Pakistan
Olympic Games
| Bronze medal – third place | 1976 Montreal | Team |
World Cup
| Silver medal – second place | 1975 Kuala Lumpur |
| Gold medal – first place | 1978 Beounis Aires |
| Gold medal – first place | 1982 Mumbai |
Asian Games
| Gold medal – first place | 1974 Tehran | Team |
| Gold medal – first place | 1978 Bangkok | Team |
| Gold medal – first place | 1982 New Delhi | Team |
Champions Trophy
| Gold medal – first place | 1980 Karachi |

Samiullah Khan (Urdu: سمیع اللہ خان; born 6 September 1951, in Bahawalpur) is a former field hockey player from Pakistan, who was nicknamed The Flying Horse because of his great speed across the hockey turf. Samiullah won multiple gold medals for Pakistan, most notably in Olympic Games and Asian Games.

== Hockey career ==
He played as a left winger for his native country in the 1970s and 1980s.

Samiullah was a member of the Pakistani field hockey team that won a bronze medal at the 1976 Summer Olympics in Montreal. He was also part of Pakistan's field hockey teams that won a silver medal at the 1975 Men's Hockey World Cup, a gold medal at the 1978 Men's Hockey World Cup, and another gold medal at the 1982 Men's Hockey World Cup. Additionally, he was a member of the Pakistani teams that won gold medals at the 1974 Asian Games in Tehran, the 1978 Asian Games in Bangkok and the 1982 Asian Games in Delhi. His ball control combined with speed made him particularly effective on the pitch. He was often able to outpace opposing players to penetrate defenses, creating scoring and playmaking opportunities.

== Acting career ==
In the 1980s, Samiullah expanded his visibility into television. He made a memorable guest appearance as himself in the Pakistan-China television play Paiman-i-Wafa, which centered on the cultural exchange of hockey players between the two nations. The production, starring Asif Raza Mir and Neelma Hasan, was warmly received by the public. One of the standout and most frequently discussed moments from the project was Samiullah's unexpected performance of pop singer Alamgir's song "Khel Hamara Hamain Jaan Se Pyara." Acting as a hockey coach in the scenes, his on-screen lip-syncing to the track became a notable piece of television trivia for his sporting fans.

== Personal life ==
His brother Kaleemullah Khan also played for the national field hockey team of Pakistan. Samiullah retired from international hockey in 1982 while he was the captain of the Pakistan team. Samiullah Khan later managed the Pakistan Hockey Team, quitting in 2005.

Samiullah is also the nephew of Motiullah, who was a member of the 1960 Rome Olympics gold-winning Pakistan hockey side.

== Awards and recognition ==
- Pride of Performance Award in 1983 by the President of Pakistan
- Sitara-i-Imtiaz (Star of Excellence) Award by the President of Pakistan in 2014
