= Hanif Khan =

Pakistani field hockey player

Medal record

Men's field hockey

Representing Pakistan

Olympic Games
Gold medal – first place	1984 Los Angeles	Team
Bronze medal – third place	1976 Montreal	Team

World Cup
Gold medal – first place	1978 Buenos Aires	Team
Gold medal – first place	1982 Mumbai	Team

Asian Games
Gold medal – first place	1978 Bangkok	Team
Gold medal – first place	1982 New Delhi	Team

Hanif Khan (Urdu: حنیف خان; born 5 July 1959) is a Pakistani field hockey player. He was born in Karachi. He won a Gold medal at the 1984 Summer Olympics in Los Angeles, and a Bronze medal at the 1976 Summer Olympics in Montreal.He won Gold Medal in 1978 and 1982 World Cups in Buenos Aires and Mumbai respectively.

== Awards and recognition ==
- Pride of Performance Award by the President of Pakistan in 1984
- Sitara-i-Imtiaz award by the President of Pakistan in 2014.
