= Hassan Sardar =

Pakistani field hockey player

Personal information
- Born: 22 October 1957 (age 68) Karachi, Pakistan
Medal record
Men's field hockey
Representing Pakistan
Olympic Games
Gold medal – first place	1984 Los Angeles	Team
Asian Games
Gold medal – first place	1982 New Delhi	Team
World Cup
Gold medal – first place	1982 Mumbai	Team

Hassan Sardar (Urdu: حسن سردار) (born 22 October 1957 in Karachi, Pakistan) is a former field hockey player and team captain from Pakistan, who won the gold medal with the Men's National Hockey Team at the 1984 Summer Olympics in Los Angeles, California.

A Karachi native, Sardar attended Habib Public High School and graduated from Aitchison College in Lahore. He began his international hockey career in the early 1980s, competing in his first Hockey World Cup in 1982 in Mumbai, India. He played as a center forward alongside teammates Shahnaz Sheikh, Samiullah Khan, Hanif Khan, and Kalimullah Khan. During the 1982 tournament, Sardar scored 11 goals, was named 'Man of the Tournament,' and Pakistan won the gold medal.

In the 1982 Asian Games in New Delhi, he helped crush India with a hat-trick as Pakistan triumphed 7–1 under the Captaincy of Samiullah. He was instrumental in leading Pakistan to a gold medal at the 1984 Olympics in Los Angeles. He later managed the Pakistani Hockey Team. He has also been the Chief Selector of Pakistan hockey team. Hassan Sardar is ranked among the greatest field hockey players.

== Awards and recognition ==
- Pride of Performance Award by the President of Pakistan in 1984.
- Sitara-i-Imtiaz Award by the President of Pakistan in 2014.

== See also ==
- Pakistan Hockey Federation
