= Manzoor-ul Hassan =

Pakistani field hockey player

Personal information
- Nationality: Pakistani
- Born: 15 January 1952 (age 74)

Sport
- Sport: Field hockey

Manzoor-ul Hassan (born 15 January 1952) is a Pakistani field hockey player. He competed in the men's tournament at the 1976 Summer Olympics at Montreal, Canada and was part of the team that won the bronze medal.

After his retirement, he also worked as a coach for the Pakistani hockey team.

== Awards ==
- Tamgha-i-Imtiaz (Medal of Excellence) by the Government of Pakistan in 1989.
