= 1981 Men's Hockey Champions Trophy =

Tournament details
- Host country: Pakistan
- City: Karachi
- Dates: 9–16 January
- Teams: 6 (from 3 confederations)

Final positions
- Champions: Netherlands (1st title)
- Runner-up: Australia
- Third place: West Germany

Tournament statistics
- Matches played: 15
- Goals scored: 86 (5.73 per match)

The 1981 Men's Hockey Champions Trophy was the third edition of the Hockey Champions Trophy men's field hockey tournament. It took place from 9–16 January in Karachi, Pakistan and was won by the Netherlands national team – the first of eight trophies to date.

== Tournament ==
=== Final table ===
Pos	Team	Pld	W	D	L	GF	GA	GD	Pts
1st place, gold medalist(s)	Netherlands (C)	5	3	2	0	22	16	+6	8
2nd place, silver medalist(s)	Australia	5	3	1	1	18	14	+4	7
3rd place, bronze medalist(s)	West Germany	5	1	3	1	14	11	+3	5
4	Pakistan (H)	5	2	1	2	13	11	+2	5
5	Spain	5	1	1	3	9	19	−10	3
6	England	5	0	2	3	10	15	−5	2

Source: FIH
(C) Champions; (H) Hosts

=== Results ===
9 January 1981

Pakistan	5–2	Spain

9 January 1981

England	1–1	West Germany

10 January 1981

Netherlands	7–5	Australia

10 January 1981

Spain	1–6	West Germany

11 January 1981

England	2–2	Australia

11 January 1981

Netherlands	1–0	Pakistan

12 January 1981

England	1–2	Spain

13 January 1981

Pakistan	3–4	Australia

13 January 1981

Netherlands	4–4	West Germany

14 January 1981

Netherlands	3–3	Spain

14 January 1981

Pakistan	3–2	England

15 January 1981

West Germany	1–3	Australia

16 January 1981

Netherlands	7–4	England

16 January 1981

Pakistan	2–2	West Germany

16 January 1981

Spain	1–4	Australia

1981 Men's Champions Trophy winners

Netherlands
First title

=== Winning squad ===
Netherlands

- Pierre Hermans
- Joost Claushuis
- Arno den Hartog
- Cees Jan Diepeveen
- Erik Pierik
- Theodor Doyer
- Jan-Carel Jenniskens
- Jaap Schultz
- Ties Kruize
- Paul Litjens
- Roderik Bouwman
- Bob-Jan Hillen
- Tim Steens
- Maarten van Grimbergern
- Ronald-Jan Heijn
- Tom van t’Hek
