= 1987 Men's Hockey Champions Trophy =

Field hockey tournament

Tournament details
- Host country: Netherlands
- City: Amstelveen
- Dates: 19–28 June
- Teams: 6
- Venue: Wagener Stadium

Final positions
- Champions: West Germany (2nd title)
- Runner-up: Netherlands
- Third place: Australia

Tournament statistics
- Matches played: 28
- Goals scored: 65 (2.32 per match)

The 1987 Men's Hockey Champions Trophy was the ninth edition of the Hockey Champions Trophy for men. The tournament was held from 19–28 June 1987, in Amstelveen, Netherlands.

West Germany won the tournament for the second time. Netherlands and Australia finished in second and third place, respectively.

== Participating nations ==
- Argentina
- Australia
- Great Britain
- Netherlands
- Pakistan
- Spain
- Soviet Union
- West Germany

== Results ==
=== Pool standings ===
Pos	Team	Pld	W	D	L	GF	GA	GD	Pts
1st place, gold medalist(s)	West Germany	7	5	2	0	18	7	+11	12
2nd place, silver medalist(s)	Netherlands	7	5	1	1	15	5	+10	11
3rd place, bronze medalist(s)	Australia	7	4	2	1	16	9	+7	10
4	Great Britain	7	4	2	1	15	8	+7	10
5	Argentina	7	2	2	3	6	15	−9	6
6	Spain	7	1	1	5	6	14	−8	3
7	Pakistan	7	1	0	6	9	16	−7	2
8	Soviet Union	7	1	0	6	7	18	−11	2

Source: FIH

=== Matches ===
19 June 1987

Netherlands	1–0	Spain
	Report

19 June 1987

West Germany	3–1	Great Britain
	Report

19 June 1987

Pakistan	2–0	Soviet Union
	Report

19 June 1987

Australia	4–1	Argentina
	Report

20 June 1987

Soviet Union	2–1	Spain
	Report

20 June 1987

Great Britain	1–1	Australia
	Report

20 June 1987

Netherlands	2–1	Pakistan
	Report

20 June 1987

West Germany	4–0	Argentina
	Report

22 June 1987

Argentina	2–0	Pakistan
	Report

22 June 1987

Spain	1–5	Great Britain
	Report

22 June 1987

Netherlands	1–1	West Germany
	Report

22 June 1987

Australia	2–1	Soviet Union
	Report

23 June 1987

West Germany	2–1	Pakistan
	Report

23 June 1987

Australia	3–1	Spain
	Report

23 June 1987

Netherlands	5–0	Argentina
	Report

23 June 1987

Great Britain	2–0	Soviet Union
	Report

25 June 1987

West Germany	2–2	Australia
	Report

25 June 1987

Netherlands	4–1	Soviet Union
	Report

25 June 1987

Pakistan	1–2	Spain
	Report

25 June 1987

Argentina	0–0	Great Britain
	Report

26 June 1987

Netherlands	0–1	Great Britain
	Report

26 June 1987

West Germany	1–0	Spain
	Report

26 June 1987

Argentina	2–1	Soviet Union
	Report

26 June 1987

Australia	3–1	Pakistan
	Report

28 June 1987

Argentina	1–1	Spain
	Report

28 June 1987

Great Britain	5–3	Pakistan
	Report

28 June 1987

West Germany	5–2	Soviet Union
	Report

28 June 1987

Australia	1–2	Netherlands
	Report
