= Maarten van Grimbergen =

Dutch field hockey player (born 1959)

Maarten Albert van Grimbergen (born October 4, 1959 in Eindhoven, North Brabant) is a former field hockey player from the Netherlands, who played a total number of 145 international matches for the Dutch Men's Nation Team, in which he scored 36 goals. The striker made his debut in 1980, and played club hockey for Eindhovense Mixed Hockey Club and HC Klein Zwitserland. Van Grimbergen represented the Netherlands in two Summer Olympics (1984 and 1992).

He is a son of hockey coach Ab van Grimbergen and a brother of hockey player Miranda van Grimbergen.
