= 1988 Men's Hockey Champions Trophy =

Field hockey tournament

Tournament details
- Host country: Pakistan
- City: Lahore
- Dates: Mar 25-Apr 1
- Teams: 6

Final positions
- Champions: West Germany (3rd title)
- Runner-up: Pakistan
- Third place: Australia

The 1988 Men's Hockey Champions Trophy was the tenth edition of the Hockey Champions Trophy men's field hockey tournament. It took place from Mar 25-Apr 1 in Lahore, Pakistan.

== Tournament ==
=== Final table ===
Team	Pld	W	D	L	GF	GA	GD	Pts
West Germany	5	4	0	1	11	5	+6	8
Pakistan	5	3	2	0	9	3	+6	8
Australia	5	2	2	1	6	4	+2	6
Soviet Union	5	1	3	1	6	6	0	5
Spain	5	1	1	3	4	10	−6	3
Great Britain	5	0	0	5	3	11	−8	0

Source: fih.ch

=== Results ===
Team One	Team Two	Score
Spain	(United Kingdom) Great Britain	2-1
Australia	West Germany	0-1
Pakistan	Soviet Union	1-1
(United Kingdom) Great Britain	Australia	0-2
West Germany	Soviet Union	3-1
Pakistan	Spain	4-0
(United Kingdom) Great Britain	Soviet Union	1-3
Spain	Australia	1-2
West Germany	Pakistan	1-2
Soviet Union	Australia	1-1
West Germany	Spain	3-1
(United Kingdom) Great Britain	Pakistan	0-1
Soviet Union	Spain	0-0
(United Kingdom) Great Britain	West Germany	1-3
Australia	Pakistan	1-1
