= Pakistan Hockey Federation =

Governing body for field hockey in Pakistan

Pakistan Hockey Federation پاکستان ہاکی فیڈریشن
- Sport: Field hockey
- Jurisdiction: Pakistan
- Membership: 8
- Abbreviation: PHF
- Founded: August 2, 1948; 78 years ago
- Affiliation: International Hockey Federation
- Regional affiliation: Asian Hockey Federation
- Headquarters: Lahore, Punjab, Pakistan
- Location: National Hockey Stadium, Ferozepur Road, Lahore 54600

Official website
- pakistanhockeyfederation.com
- (Pakistan)

The Pakistan Hockey Federation (Urdu: پاکستان ہاکی فیڈریشن) is the governing body for the sport of field hockey in Pakistan. It is affiliated with the International Hockey Federation (FIH), Asian Hockey Federation (AHF) and Pakistan Sports Board (PSB).

== Affiliated associations ==
- Azad Jammu and Kashmir Hockey Association
- Balochistan Hockey Association
- Gilgit-Baltistan Hockey Association
- Islamabad Hockey Association
- Khyber Pakhtunkhwa Hockey Association
- Punjab Hockey Association
- Sindh Hockey Association

== Presidents ==
The following is a list of the Presidents of PHF:

No.	Name	Tenure start	Tenure end
1	Raja Ghazanfar Ali Khan	1948	1950
2	Chaudhry Nazir Ahmed	1950	1952
3	Khan Abdul Qayyum Khan	1952	1954
4	Nawab Mushtaq Ahmed Gurmani	1955	1956
5	Mian Naseer Ahmed	1956	1958
6	General Muhammad Musa Khan	1960	1966
7	Air Marshal Nur Khan	1967	1969
8	Saeed Ahmed Khan	1969	1969
9	Lieutenant General Khwaja Mohammad Azhar Khan	1970	1972
10	Nawab Sadiq Hussain Qureshi	1972	1976
11	Air Marshal Nur Khan	1976	1984
12	Air Vice-Marshal Waqar Azeem	1984	1986
13	Air Marshal Azim Daudpota	1986	1990
14	Air Chief Marshal Farooq Feroze Khan	1990	1991
15	M. Nawaz Tiwana	1991	1993
16	Air Vice-Marshal Farooq Umar	1993	1996
17	M. Nawaz Tiwana	1996	1997
18	Akhtar Rasool	1997	1999
19	Arif Ali Khan Abbasi	1999	2000
20	General Aziz Khan	2000	2004
21	Tariq Kirmani	2005	2006
22	Mir Zafarullah Khan Jamali	2006	2008
23	Qasim Zia	2008	2013
24	Akhtar Rasool	2013	2016
25	Brigadier (Retd.) Khalid Sajjad Khokhar	2016	2023
26	Mir Tariq Hussain Bugti (on nomination basis)	2023	2026
27	Mohyuddin Ahmad Wani (Ad Hoc President)	2026	Present

== Secretaries ==
The following is a list of the Secretaries General of PHF:

No.	Name	Tenure start	Tenure end
1	Baseer Ali Sheikh	January 1948	December 1954
2	Syed M. Ayub	January 1954	January 1955
3	Mian Riazuddin Ahmed	January 1955	1960
4	Brigadier Riaz Hussain	January 1960	December 1962
5	Aurangzeb Khan	January 1962	March 1964
6	Lieutenant Colonel Zafar Ali Khan	March 1964	September 1967
7	Wing Commander Masood Ahmed	June 1967	December 1969
8	M. Sharif Janjua	December 1969	1970
9	Major Khurshid Zaman	1970	1971
10	Shamim Yazdani	1972	1972
11	Sardar Asif Hayat	1972	1978
12	Brigadier (Retd.) Manzoor Hussain Atif	1978	1990
13	Abdul Hamid	1991	1992
14	Colonel Syed Mudassar Asghar	1993	1999
15	Brigadier (Retd.) Manzoor Hussain Atif	18 December 1999	11 June 2000
16	Zahir Shah	12 June 2000	5 July 2000
17	Brigadier Musarrat Ullah Khan	5 July 2000	31 July 2006
18	Akhtar-ul-Islam	1 August 2006	21 March 2007
19	Khalid Mahmood	2 April 2007	30 June 2008
20	Asif Bajwa	1 July 2008	11 September 2013
21	Rana Mujahid (acting)	11 September 2013	25 November 2013
22	Rana Mujahid	25 November 2013	2 September 2015
23	Shahbaz Ahmed	2 September 2015	4 May 2019
24	Asif Bajwa	6 May 2019	2022
25	Syed Haider Hussain	2022	2026
26	Brigadier Akmal Aziz	2026	Present

Note: Syed Shakeel Shah was appointed acting secretary during the three-month leave period of Brig (Retd) Akmal Aziz in March 2026.

== See also ==
- International Tournaments (field hockey)
