= Field hockey at the 1988 Summer Olympics – Men's team squads =

List of hockey players

The following is the list of squads that took place in the men's field hockey tournament at the 1988 Summer Olympics.

== Group A ==
=== Argentina ===
The following players represented Argentina:

- Otto Schmitt
- Alejandro Siri
- Miguel Altube
- Marcelo Mascheroni
- Marcelo Garrafo
- Edgardo Pailos
- Alejandro Doherty
- Aldo Ayala
- Carlos Geneyro
- Gabriel Minadeo
- Alejandro Verga
- Fernando Ferrara
- Emanuel Roggero
- Franco Nicola
- Martín Sordelli
- Mariano Silva

=== Australia ===
The following players represented Australia:

- Craig Davies
- Colin Batch
- John Bestall
- Warren Birmingham
- Ric Charlesworth
- Andrew Deane
- Michael York
- Mark Hager
- Jay Stacy
- Neil Hawgood
- Peter Noel
- Graham Reid
- Roger Smith
- Neil Snowden
- David Wansbrough
- Ken Wark

=== Kenya ===
The following players represented Kenya:

- Paul Sewe Omany
- Parminder Singh Saini
- Roy Odhier
- Charles Oguk
- John Eliud Okoth
- Michael Omondi
- Samuel Ngoyo
- Peter Akatsa
- Sanjiwan Goyal
- Christopher Otambo
- Lucas Alubaha
- Victor Owino
- Samson Oriso
- Inderjit Singh Matharu
- Samson Muange
- Julius Mutinda

=== Netherlands ===
The following players represented the Netherlands:

- Frank Leistra
- Marc Benninga
- Cees Jan Diepeveen
- Maurits Crucq
- René Klaassen
- Hendrik Jan Kooijman
- Marc Delissen
- Jacques Brinkman
- Gert Jan Schlatmann
- Tim Steens
- Floris Jan Bovelander
- Patrick Faber
- Ronald Jansen
- Hidde Kruize
- Erik Parlevliet
- Taco van den Honert

=== Pakistan ===
The following players represented Pakistan:

- Mansoor Ahmed
- Nasir Ali
- Qazi Mohib
- Amir Zafar
- Ishtiaq Ahmed
- Naeem Akhtar
- Muhammad Qamar Ibrahim
- Shahbaz Ahmed
- Tariq Sheikh
- Zahid Sharif
- Khalid Hamid
- Khalid Bashir
- Naeem Amjad
- Tahir Zaman
- Musaddiq Hussain

=== Spain ===
The following players represented Spain:

- Miguel Rovira
- Ignacio Escudé
- Kim Malgosa
- Andrés Gómez
- Juantxo García-Mauriño
- Jaime Armengold
- Juan Carlos Peón
- Juan Malgosa
- Jaime Escudé
- Xavier Escudé
- Jordi Oliva
- Miguel Ortego
- Miguel de Paz
- Eduardo Fábregas
- José Antonio Iglesias
- Santiago Grau

== Group B ==
=== Canada ===
The following players represented Canada:

- Ross Rutledge
- Nick Sandhu
- Rick Albert
- Patrick Burrows
- Paul Chohan
- Chris Gifford
- Wayne Grimmer
- Ranjit Rai
- Peter Milkovich
- Trevor Porritt
- Ian Bird
- Doug Harris
- Michael Muller
- Pat Caruso
- Ajay Dubé
- Ken Goodwin

=== Great Britain ===
The following players represented Great Britain:

- Ian Taylor
- Veryan Pappin
- David Faulkner
- Paul Barber
- Stephen Martin
- Jon Potter
- Richard Dodds
- Martyn Grimley
- Steve Batchelor
- Richard Leman
- Jimmy Kirkwood
- Kulbir Bhaura
- Sean Kerly
- Robert Clift
- Imran Sherwani
- Russell Garcia

=== India ===
The following players represented India:

- Rajinder Singh Rawat
- Pargat Singh
- Ashok Kumar
- Mohinder Pal Singh
- Somaya Muttana Maneypandey
- Vivek Singh
- Sujit Kumar
- Subramani Balada Kalaiah
- Mohammed Shahid
- Jude Sebastian
- Balwinder Singh
- Merwyn Fernandis
- Thoiba Singh
- Gundeep Kumar
- Jagbir Singh
- Mark Patterson

=== South Korea ===
The following players represented South Korea:

- Song Seok-chan
- Kim Yeong-jun
- Kim Jong-gap
- Jeong Bu-jin
- Jeong Gye-seok
- Kim Jae-cheon
- Kwon Sun-pil
- Mo Ji-yeong
- Ji Jae-gwan
- Kim Man-hoe
- Han Jin-su
- Lee Heung-pyo
- Heo Sang-nyeong
- Park Jae-sik
- Yu Seung-jin
- Sin Seok-gyun

=== Soviet Union ===
The following players represented the Soviet Union:

- Vladimir Pleshakov
- Viktor Deputatov
- Igor Yulchiyev
- Sos Hayrapetyan
- Vladimir Antakov
- Vyacheslav Chechenev
- Igor Atanov
- Sergey Shakhvorostov
- Sergei Pleshakov
- Mikhail Nichepurenko
- Aleksandr Domashev
- Igor Davydov
- Aleksandr Myasnikov
- Yevgeny Nechayev
- Mikhail Bukatin

=== West Germany ===
The following players represented West Germany:

- Christian Schliemann
- Tobias Frank
- Horst-Ulrich Hänel
- Carsten Fischer
- Andreas Mollandin
- Ekkhard Schmidt-Opper
- Dirk Brinkmann
- Heiner Dopp
- Stefan Blöcher
- Andreas Keller
- Thomas Reck
- Thomas Brinkmann
- Hanns-Henning Fastrich
- Michael Hilgers
- Volker Fried
- Michael Metz
