= Kenya at the 1988 Summer Olympics =

- IOC code: KEN
- NOC: National Olympic Committee of Kenya
- Website: teamkenya.or.ke

in Seoul
- Competitors: 74 (70 men and 4 women) in 7 sports
- Flag bearer: Patrick Waweru
- Medals Ranked 13th: Gold 5 Silver 2 Bronze 2 Total 9

Summer Olympics appearances (overview)
- 1956; 1960; 1964; 1968; 1972; 1976–1980; 1984; 1988; 1992; 1996; 2000; 2004; 2008; 2012; 2016; 2020; 2024

Kenya participated in the 1988 Summer Olympics in Seoul, South Korea.

== Medalists ==
Medal	Name	Sport	Event	Date
Gold	Paul Ereng	Athletics	Men's 800 m	26 September
Gold	Julius Kariuki	Athletics	Men's 3000 m steeplechase	30 September
Gold	John Ngugi	Athletics	Men's 5000 m	1 October
Gold	Peter Rono	Athletics	Men's 1500 m	1 October
Gold	Robert Wangila	Boxing	Men's welterweight (–67 kg)	1 October
Silver	Peter Koech	Athletics	Men's 3000 m steeplechase	30 September
Silver	Douglas Wakiihuri	Athletics	Men's marathon	2 October
Bronze	Kipkemboi Kimeli	Athletics	Men's 10,000 m	26 September
Bronze	Chris Sande	Boxing	Men's middleweight (–75 kg)	29 September

== Competitors ==
The following is the list of number of competitors in the Games.

Sport	Men	Women	Total
Athletics	29	4	33
Boxing	12	–	12
Field hockey	16	0	16
Judo	4	–	4
Shooting	1	0	1
Weightlifting	4	–	4
Wrestling	4	–	4
Total	70	4	74

== Athletics ==
Men
Track and road events

Athlete	Event	Heat Round 1		Heat Round 2		Semifinal		Final	
Athlete	Event	Time	Rank	Time	Rank	Time	Rank	Time	Rank
Kennedy Ondiek	100 metres	10.51	33 q	10.57	40	Did not advance			
Peter Wekesa	100 metres	10.50	32 Q	10.43	28	Did not advance			
Kennedy Ondiek	200 metres	20.79	9 Q	20.79	17	Did not advance			
Simeon Kipkemboi	400 metres	46.15	15 Q	45.44	19	Did not advance			
Elkana Nyangau	400 metres	46.25	18 q	46.09	27	Did not advance			
Lucas Sang	400 metres	46.85	26 Q	45.72	21	Did not advance			
Paul Ereng	800 metres	1:46.14	1 Q	1:46.38	9 Q	1:44.55	1 Q	1:43.45	1st place, gold medalist(s)
Nixon Kiprotich	800 metres	1:48.68	22 Q	1:45.68	4 Q	1:44.71	2 Q	1:49.55	8
Juma Ndiwa	800 metres	1:47.11	7 Q	1:47.27	23	Did not advance			
Kip Cheruiyot	1500 metres	3:39.98	7 Q	—N/a		3:38.09	1 Q	3:37.94	7
Joseph Chesire	1500 metres	3:41.72	17 Q	—N/a		3:39.17	12 q	3:40.82	11
Peter Rono	1500 metres	3:37.65	1 Q	—N/a		3:38.25	3 Q	3:35.96	1st place, gold medalist(s)
Charles Cheruiyot	5000 metres	13:43.11	2 Q	—N/a		13:38.44	21	Did not advance	
John Ngugi	5000 metres	13:47.93	19 Q	—N/a		13:24.43	9 Q	13:11.70	1st place, gold medalist(s)
Yobes Ondieki	5000 metres	13:58.24	27 Q	—N/a		13:22.85	5 Q	13:52.01	12
Kipkemboi Kimeli	10,000 metres	28:00.39	1 Q	—N/a				27:25.16	3rd place, bronze medalist(s)
Boniface Merande	10,000 metres	28:21.84	12 q	—N/a				DNF	
Moses Tanui	10,000 metres	28:20.98	11 Q	—N/a				27:47.23	8
Ibrahim Hussein	Marathon	—N/a						DNF	
Joseph Kipsang	Marathon	—N/a						DNF	
Douglas Wakiihuri	Marathon	—N/a						2:10:47	2nd place, silver medalist(s)
Simon Kitur	400 metres hurdles	49.88	11 Q	—N/a		49.74	12	Did not advance	
Joseph Maritim	400 metres hurdles	49.64	7 Q	—N/a		49.50	10	Did not advance	
Gideon Yego	400 metres hurdles	49.80	10 Q	—N/a		DQ		Did not advance	
Julius Kariuki	3000 metres steeplechase	8:33.42	7 Q	—N/a		8:18.53	10 Q	8:05.51 OR	1st place, gold medalist(s)
Peter Koech	3000 metres steeplechase	8:31.66	4 Q	—N/a		8:15.68	2 Q	8:06.79	2nd place, silver medalist(s)
Patrick Sang	3000 metres steeplechase	8:36.11	11 Q	—N/a		8:16.70	5 Q	8:15.22	7
Elkana Nyangau; Kennedy Ondiek; Simeon Kipkemboi; Peter Wekesa	4 × 100 metres relay	40.30	16 q	—N/a		39.47	13	Did not advance	
Tito Sawe; Lucas Sang; Paul Ereng; Simeon Kipkemboi	4 × 400 metres relay	3:05.21	5 Q	—N/a		3:03.24	6 Q	3:04.69	8
William Sawe	50 kilometres walk	—N/a						4:25:24	35

Field events

Athlete	Event	Qualification		Final	
Athlete	Event	Distance	Position	Distance	Position
David Lamai	Long jump	NM		Did not advance	

Women
Track and road events

Athlete	Event	Heat Round 1		Heat Round 2		Semifinal		Final	
Athlete	Event	Time	Rank	Time	Rank	Time	Rank	Time	Rank
Joyce Odhiambo	100 metres	11.90	46	Did not advance					
Joyce Odhiambo	200 metres	24.26	38	Did not advance					
Susan Sirma	1500 metres	4:10.13	19	—N/a				Did not advance	
Susan Sirma	3000 metres	9:06.90	27	—N/a				Did not advance	
Pascaline Wangui	Marathon	—N/a						2:47:42	49
Rose Tata-Muya	400 metres hurdles	56.18	20	—N/a		Did not advance			

== Boxing ==
Athlete	Event	Round of 64	Round of 32	Round of 16	Quarterfinals	Semifinals	Final	
Athlete	Event	Opposition Result	Opposition Result	Opposition Result	Opposition Result	Opposition Result	Opposition Result	Rank
Maurice Maina	Light flyweight	Bye	Haddad (SYR); W 4–1	Sasakul (THA); L 0–5	Did not advance			
Anthony Ikegu	Flyweight	Bye	Desavoye (FRA); L RSC R2	Did not advance				
Steve Mwema	Bantamweight	Bye	Giri (NEP); W RSC R2	Machaze (MOZ); W 5–0	McKinney (USA); L 0–5	Did not advance		
John Wanjau	Featherweight	Szőke (HUN); W 3–2	Tuur (NED); L 1–4	Did not advance				
Patrick Waweru	Lightweight	Zülow (GDR); L 0–5	Did not advance					
David Kamau	Light welterweight	Shabab (JOR); W RSC R1	N'Dongo Ebanga (CMR); W 5–0	Altansükh (MGL); L 0–5	Did not advance			
Robert Wangila	Welterweight	Bye	Petronijević (YUG); W RSC R2	Gantulga (MGL); W Retired	Furnigov (BUL); W 5–0	Dydak (POL); W Walkover	Boudouani (FRA); W KO	1st place, gold medalist(s)
Mohamad Orungi	Light middleweight	Bye	de Silveira (ANG); L RSC R2	Did not advance				
Chris Sande	Middleweight	Bye	Montiel (URU); W KO	Kamela (CMR); W 5–0	Wanyama (UGA); W 5–0	Maske (GDR); L 0–5	Did not advance	3rd place, bronze medalist(s)
Joseph Akhasamba	Light heavyweight	—N/a	Nedd (ARU); W RSC R2	Talia'uli (TGA); W 5–0	Škaro (YUG); L 0–5	Did not advance		
Harold Obunga	Heavyweight	—N/a	Bye	Fale (TGA); W RSC R1	Gołota (POL); L 0–5	Did not advance		
Crispine Odera	Super heavyweight	—N/a	Bye	Lewis (CAN); L RSC R2	Did not advance			

== Field hockey ==
Summary

Key:

- FT – After full time.
- P – Match decided by penalty-shootout.

Team	Event	Group stage						Semifinal	Final / BM	
Team	Event	Opposition Score	Opposition Score	Opposition Score	Opposition Score	Opposition Score	Rank	Opposition Score	Opposition Score	Rank
Kenya men's	Men's tournament	Australia; L 1–7	Pakistan; L 0–8	Spain; L 2–4	Netherlands; L 1–2	Argentina; L 1–5	6	South Korea; L 2–5	Canada; L 1–3	12

=== Men's tournament ===
Team roster
- ( 1.) Paul Sewe Omany
- ( 2.) Parminder Saini
- ( 3.) Roy Odhier
- ( 4.) Charles Oguk
- ( 5.) John Eliud Okoth
- ( 6.) Michael Omondi
- ( 7.) Sam Ngoyo
- ( 8.) Peter Akatsa
- ( 9.) Sanjiwan Goyal
- (10.) Christopher Otambo
- (11.) Lucas Alubaha
- (12.) Victor Owino
- (13.) Samson Oriso
- (14.) Inderjit Matharu
- (15.) Samson Muange
- (16.) Julius Mutua

- Head coach: Gursharam Singh Lall

Group play

Pos	Team	Pld	W	D	L	GF	GA	GD	Pts	Qualification
1	Australia	5	5	0	0	19	3	+16	10	Semi-finals
2	Netherlands	5	3	1	1	12	6	+6	7	Semi-finals
3	Pakistan	5	3	0	2	15	8	+7	6	5–8th place semi-finals
4	Argentina	5	2	0	3	8	12	−4	4	5–8th place semi-finals
5	Spain	5	1	1	3	6	10	−4	3	9–12th place semi-finals
6	Kenya	5	0	0	5	5	26	−21	0	9–12th place semi-finals

Source: FIH

18 September 1988
15:15

Australia	7–1	Kenya
Birmingham 12', 25'; Wansbrough 34'; Hager 39', 56', 65'; Batch 61'	Report	Goyal 58'

Umpires:
Claude Seidler (FRG)
Adriano de Vecchi (ITA)

20 September 1988
15:15

Pakistan	8–0	Kenya
Tariq 8', 9', 47', 52'; Qazi 16'; Zahid 33'; Shahbaz 64', 66'	Report

Umpires:
Iwo Sakaida (JPN)
Louismichel Gillet (FRA)

22 September 1988
13:30

Kenya	2–4	Spain
Okoth 34'; Matharu 40'	Report	Oliva 17'; Jv. Escudé 20'; De Paz 24'; I. Escudé 45'

Umpires:
Patrick van Beneden (BEL)
Richard Kentwell (USA)

24 September 1988
10:45

Netherlands	2–1	Kenya
Bovelander 29'; Van den Honert 39'	Report	Matharu 70'

Umpires:
Graham Nash (ENG)
Amarjit Bawa (IND)

26 September 1988
13:30

Argentina	5–1	Kenya
Mascheroni 8'; Pailos 42'; Ferrara 44'; Verga 47'; Minadeo 63'	Report	Alubaha 32'

Umpires:
Claude Seidler (FRG)
Patrick van Beneden (BEL)

Classification match 9th-12th place

28 September 1988
09:00

South Korea	5–2 (a.e.t.)	Kenya
Han Jin-soo 10', 71'; Yoo Seung-jin 15', 76'	Report	Alubaha 13'; Matharu 49'

Umpires:
Graham Nash (ENG)
Iwo Sakaida (JPN)

11th place match

29 September 1988
15:15

Canada	3–1	Kenya
Sandhu 17'; Porritt 24'; Rutledge 31'	Report	Akatsa 44'

Umpires:
Nikolai Stepanov (URS)
Richard Kentwell (USA)

== Judo ==
Athlete	Event	Round of 64	Round of 32	Round of 16	Quarterfinals	Semifinals	Repechage			Final	
Athlete	Event	Round of 64	Round of 32	Round of 16	Quarterfinals	Semifinals	Round 1	Round 2	Round 3	Final	
Athlete	Event	Opposition Result	Opposition Result	Opposition Result	Opposition Result	Opposition Result	Opposition Result	Opposition Result	Opposition Result	Opposition Result	Rank
John Bogie	65 kg	Céspedes (PAR); L Hansoku-goshi	Did not advance								
Nelson Ombito	71 kg	Bye	Swain (USA); L Ippon	Did not advance							
James Kihara	78 kg	González (ESP); L Ippon	Did not advance								
Tiberius Nyachwaya	86 kg	Bye	Kim (KOR); L Ippon	Did not advance							

== Shooting ==
Men

Athlete	Event	Qualification		Final	
Athlete	Event	Points	Rank	Points	Rank
Shuaib Adam	10 m air pistol	556	44	Did not advance	
Shuaib Adam	50 m pistol	532	42	Did not advance	

== Weightlifting ==
Athlete	Event	Snatch		Clean & jerk		Total	Rank
Athlete	Event	Result	Rank	Result	Rank	Total	Rank
Juma Abudu	60 kg	90.0	14	110.0	11	200.0	11
David Maina	75 kg	105.0	22	NM		DNF	
Suleman Juma	90 kg	120.0	23	145.0	22	265.0	22
Pius Ochieng	110 kg	125.0	17	170.0	14	295.0	15

== Wrestling ==
Greco-Roman

Athlete	Event	Group Stage								Final	
Athlete	Event	Opposition Result	Opposition Result	Opposition Result	Opposition Result	Opposition Result	Opposition Result	Opposition Result	Rank	Opposition Result	Rank
Lamachi Elimu	52 kg	Hu (CHN); L 2–18	Vadász (HUN); L Fall	Did not advance				—N/a	9	Did not advance	
Kiptoo Salbei	68 kg	Karamanliev (BUL); L 0–15	Julfalakyan (URS); L 0–16	Did not advance			—N/a		12	Did not advance	
Maisiba Obwoge	100 kg	Sy (MTN); L Fall	Bye	Yu (KOR); L Fall	Did not advance			—N/a	7	Did not advance	

Freestyle

Athlete	Event	Group Stage								Final	
Athlete	Event	Opposition Result	Opposition Result	Opposition Result	Opposition Result	Opposition Result	Opposition Result	Opposition Result	Rank	Opposition Result	Rank
Lamachi Elimu	52 kg	Muñoz (COL); L Fall	Enkhbayar (MGL); L Fall	Did not advance					12	Did not advance	
Waruingi Kimani	57 kg	Zelfani (TUN); L 0–18	Mohammadian (IRI); L 0–15	Did not advance				—N/a	12	Did not advance	
Kiptoo Salbei	68 kg	Hidalgo (PAN); L 3–19	Athanasiadis (GRE); L Fall	Did not advance					12	Did not advance	
Maisiba Obwoge	100 kg	Pușcașu (ROU); L Fall	Sar (MTN); L Fall	Did not advance				—N/a	9	Did not advance	
