= India at the 1988 Summer Olympics =

- IOC code: IND
- NOC: Indian Olympic Association

in Seoul
- Competitors: 46 in 11 sports
- Flag bearer: Kartar Dhillon Singh
- Medals: Gold 0 Silver 0 Bronze 0 Total 0

Summer Olympics appearances (overview)
- 1900; 1904–1912; 1920; 1924; 1928; 1932; 1936; 1948; 1952; 1956; 1960; 1964; 1968; 1972; 1976; 1980; 1984; 1988; 1992; 1996; 2000; 2004; 2008; 2012; 2016; 2020; 2024

India competed in seven events at the 1988 Summer Olympics in Seoul, South Korea, winning no medals.

== Competitors ==
The following is the list of number of competitors in the Games.

| Sport | Men | Women | Total |
|---|---|---|---|
| Archery | 3 | 0 | 3 |
| Athletics | 0 | 5 | 5 |
| Boxing | 3 | – | 3 |
| Field hockey | 16 | 0 | 16 |
| Sailing | 2 | 0 | 2 |
| Shooting | 0 | 1 | 1 |
| Swimming | 1 | 0 | 1 |
| Table tennis | 2 | 1 | 3 |
| Tennis | 3 | 0 | 3 |
| Weightlifting | 2 | – | 2 |
| wrestling | 7 | – | 7 |
| Total | 39 | 7 | 46 |

== Results by event ==
=== Archery ===
In India's first appearance in Olympic archery, the nation was represented by three men.

Men

| Athlete | Event | Ranking round | | Eighth-final | | Quarterfinal | | Semifinal | | Final | |
| Athlete | Event | Score | Rank | Score | Rank | Score | Rank | Score | Rank | Score | Rank |
|---|---|---|---|---|---|---|---|---|---|---|---|
| Shyam Lal | Individual | 1150 | 71 | Did not advance | | | | | | | |
| Limba Ram | Individual | 1232 | 39 | Did not advance | | | | | | | |
| Sanjeeva Singh | Individual | 1233 | 36 | Did not advance | | | | | | | |
| Shyam Lal; Limba Ram; Sanjeeva Singh | Team | 3615 | 20 | Did not advance | | | | | | | |

=== Athletics ===
==== Women ====
===== Track events =====
| Athlete | Events | Heat | | Round 2 | | Semifinal | | Final | |
| Athlete | Events | Time | Position | Time | Position | Time | Position | Time | Position |
|---|---|---|---|---|---|---|---|---|---|
| Mercy Alapurackal | 400 m | 53.41 | 26 | 53.93 | 30 | Did not advance | | | |
| Shiny Abraham | 800 m | 2:03.26 | 18 | | | Did not advance | | | |
| Pilavullakandi Thekkeparambil Usha | 400 m Hurdles | 59.55 | 31 | | | Did not advance | | | |
| Mercy Alapurackal; Shiny Abraham; Vandana Shanbagh; Vandana Rao | 4 × 400 m Relay | 3:33.46 | 7 | | | | | Did not advance | |

=== Boxing ===
| Athlete | Event | Round of 64 | Round of 32 | Round of 16 | Quarterfinals | Semifinals | Final |
| Athlete | Event | Opposition Result | Opposition Result | Opposition Result | Opposition Result | Opposition Result | Opposition Result |
|---|---|---|---|---|---|---|---|
| Shahuraj Birajdar | Bantamweight | | Ayewoubo Akomatsri (TOG); W 5-0 | Kennedy McKinney (USA); WO | Did not advance | | |
| John William Francis | Featherweight | | Dong Liu (CHN); L 2-3 | Did not advance | | | |
| Manoj Pingale | Flyweight | | Joseph Chongo (ZAM); W 5-0 | Mario Gonzalez (MEX); L 1-4 | Did not advance | | |

=== Field hockey ===
The results of the Indian Olympic field hockey teams are as follows:

==== Men's team competition ====
===== Team roster =====
- Maneypandu Somaya (captain)
- Rajinder Singh (goalkeeper)
- Pargat Singh
- Ashok Kumar
- Mohinder Pal Singh
- Vivek Singh
- Sujit Kumar
- Subrami Balanda Kalaiash
- Mohammed Shahid
- Sebastian Jude Felix
- Balwinder Singh
- Mervyn Fernandis
- Thoiba Singh
- Gundeep Kumar
- Jagbir Singh
- Mark Patterson (goalkeeper)

- Head coach: Ganbash Mollera Poovaiah

==== Group B ====
| Pos | Team | Pld | W | D | L | GF | GA | GD | Pts | Qualification |
|---|---|---|---|---|---|---|---|---|---|---|
| 1 | West Germany | 5 | 4 | 1 | 0 | 13 | 3 | +10 | 9 | Semi-finals |
| 2 | Great Britain | 5 | 3 | 1 | 1 | 12 | 5 | +7 | 7 | Semi-finals |
| 3 | India | 5 | 2 | 1 | 2 | 9 | 7 | +2 | 5 | 5–8th place semi-finals |
| 4 | Soviet Union | 5 | 2 | 1 | 2 | 5 | 10 | −5 | 5 | 5–8th place semi-finals |
| 5 | South Korea (H) | 5 | 0 | 2 | 3 | 5 | 10 | −5 | 2 | 9–12th place semi-finals |
| 6 | Canada | 5 | 0 | 2 | 3 | 3 | 12 | −9 | 2 | 9–12th place semi-finals |

Source: FIH
(H) Hosts

18 September 1988
09:00

| Soviet Union | 1–0 | India |
|---|---|---|
| Davydov 6' | Report |

Umpires:
Don Prior (AUS)
Eduardo Ruiz (ARG)

20 September 1988
13:30

| West Germany | 1–1 | India |
|---|---|---|
| Hilgers 39' | Report | Sebastian 31' |

Umpires:
Santiago Deo (ESP)
Alain Renaud (FRA)

22 September 1988
10:45

| South Korea | 1–3 | India |
|---|---|---|
| Kim Young-joon 16' | Report | T. Singh 55', 60'; Sebastian 58' |

Umpires:
Santiago Deo (ESP)
Iwo Sakaida (JPN)

24 September 1988
15:15

| Canada | 1–5 | India |
|---|---|---|
| Rutledge 22' | Report | M. Singh 11', 29'; Sebastian 32'; Fernandis 55'; Baladadalaisah 56' |

Umpires:
Amjarit Dhak (KEN)
Iwo Sakaida (JPN)

26 September 1988
13:30

| Great Britain | 3–0 | India |
|---|---|---|
| Barber 37'; Kerly 46'; Potter 50' | Report |

Umpires:
Alain Renaud (FRA)
Adriano de Vecchi (ITA)

==== 5–8th place semi-finals ====
28 September 1988
11:00

| India | 6–6 (a.e.t.) | Argentina |
|---|---|---|
| M. Singh 15', 25'; Fernandis 23', 26'; B. Singh 38'; Mohamed 80' | Report | Geneyro 21', 48', 90'; Ferrara 33'; Mascheroni 56' |
Penalties
| Kumar (penalty shoot-out missed); Felix (penalty shoot-out scored); V. Singh (penalty shoot-out missed); Fernandis (penalty shoot-out scored); B. Singh (penalty shoot-out scored); B. Singh (penalty shoot-out scored) | 4–3 | (penalty shoot-out missed) Mascheroni; (penalty shoot-out scored) Siri; (penalty shoot-out missed) Altube; (penalty shoot-out scored) Geneyro; (penalty shoot-out scored) Ferrara; (penalty shoot-out missed) Altube |

Umpires:
Patrick van Beneden (BEL)
Rob Lathouwers (NED)

==== Fifth place game ====
30 September 1988
09:00

| India | 1–2 | Pakistan |
|---|---|---|
| M. Singh 68' | Report | Musaddiz 22'; Qazi 50' |

Umpires:
Eduardo Ruiz (ARG)
Graham Nash (ENG)

=== Swimming ===
==== Men ====
| Athlete | Events | Heat | | Final B | | Final A | |
| Athlete | Events | Time | Position | Time | Position | Time | Position |
|---|---|---|---|---|---|---|---|
| Ranjoy Punja | 100 m backstroke | DNS | - | Did not advance | | | |
| Khazansingh Tokas | 200 m butterfly | 2:03.95 | 28 | Did not advance | | | |

=== Table Tennis ===
| Athlete | Event | Preliminary round | Standing | Round of 16 | Quarterfinal | Semifinal | Final |
|---|---|---|---|---|---|---|---|
| Sujay Ghorpade | Men's Singles | Andrzej Grubba (POL); L 0-3 Y Miyazaki (JPN); L 0-3; Joerg Rosskopf (FRG); L 0-3; Zoran Primorac (YUG); L 0-3; Atanda Musa (NGR); L 1-3; Gary Haberl (AUS); L 2-3; Francisco Lopez (VEN); W 3-2 | 7th in group | Did not advance | | | |
| Kamlesh Mehta | Men's Singles | Jörgen Persson (SWE); L 1-3 Ki Taik Kim (KOR); L 0-3; Kiyoshi Saito (JPN); L 0-3; Mariano Loukov (BUL); W 3-1; Piotr Molenda (POL); W 3-1; Jorge Gambra (CHI); W 3-0; Sherif Elsaket (EGY); W 3-1 | 4th in group | Did not advance | | | |
| Sujay Ghorpade; Kamlesh Mehta | Men's Doubles | China (CHN); L 0-2 Sweden (SWE); L 0-2; Japan (JPN); L 0-2; Hungary (HUN); L 1-2; Great Britain (GBR); L 0-2; Hong Kong (HKG); W 2-0; Tunisia (TUN); W 2-0 | 6th in group | Did not advance | | | |
| Niyati Roy | Women's Singles | F Boulatova (URS); L 0-3 Marie Hrachova (TCH); L 0-3; Hsiu-Yu Chang (TPE); L 0-3; Karina Bogaerts (BEL); L 0-3; Mee Wan Leong (MAS); L 0-3 | 6th in group | Did not advance | | | |

=== Tennis ===
| Athlete | Event | Round of 64 | Round of 32 | Round of 16 | Quarterfinal | Semifinal | Final |
|---|---|---|---|---|---|---|---|
| Zeeshan Ali | Men's Singles | Victo Caballero (PAR); W 6-3, 6-4, 6-2 | Jakob Hlasek (SUI); L 6-4, 7-5, 7-5 | Did not advance | | | |
| Vijay Amritraj | Men's Singles | Henri Leconte (FRA); L 4-6, 6-4, 6-4, 3-6, 6-3 | Did not advance | | | | |

=== Weightlifting ===
| Athlete | Event | Snatch | Clean & Jerk | Total | Rank |
| Athlete | Event | Result | Result | Total | Rank |
|---|---|---|---|---|---|
| Gurunathan Muthuswamy | Men's −52 kg | 102.5 | 125 | 227.5 | 11 |
| Raghavan Chanderasekaran | Men's −52 kg | 92.5 | 115 | 207.5 | 19 |
