= 1989 Men's Hockey Champions Trophy =

Field hockey tournament

Tournament details
- City: West Berlin
- Dates: 10–18 June
- Teams: 6 (from 3 confederations)

Final positions
- Champions: Australia (4th title)
- Runner-up: Netherlands
- Third place: West Germany

Tournament statistics
- Matches played: 15
- Goals scored: 55 (3.67 per match)
- Top scorer: (West Germany) Carsten Fischer (7 goals)

The 1989 Men's Hockey Champions Trophy was the 11th edition of the Hockey Champions Trophy, an international men's field hockey tournament. It took place from 10 until 18 June 1989 in West Berlin.

Australia won the tournament for the fourth time by finishing first in the round-robin tournament. West Germany were the defending champions but finished third.

== Teams ==
Team	Appearance	Last appearance	Previous best performance
Australia	11th	1988	1st (1983, 1984, 1985)
Great Britain	8th	1988	2nd (1985)
India	6th	1986	3rd (1982)
Netherlands	9th	1987	1st (1981, 1982)
Pakistan	11th	1988	1st (1978, 1980)
West Germany	9th	1988	1st (1986, 1987, 1988)

== Results ==
Pos	Team	Pld	W	D	L	GF	GA	GD	Pts
1	Australia (C)	5	4	1	0	12	8	+4	9
2	Netherlands	5	4	0	1	12	6	+6	8
3	West Germany (H)	5	2	1	2	10	8	+2	5
4	Pakistan	5	2	0	3	9	12	−3	4
5	Great Britain	5	1	0	4	5	9	−4	2
6	India	5	1	0	4	7	12	−5	2

Source: FIH
(C) Champions; (H) Hosts

10 June 1989
16:00

West Germany	2–3	India
Fischer 51'; Hilgers 62'	Report	Mukesh 31'; Jude Felix 37'; Mohinder 38'

Umpires:
Santiago Deo (ESP)
Allan Schasser (AUS)

11 June 1989
14:00

Netherlands	2–0	Great Britain
Brinkman 16'; Delissen 23'	Report

Umpires:
Amarjit Bawa (IND)
Claude Seidler (GER)

11 June 1989
17:00

Pakistan	3–4	Australia
Zahid 26'; Feroz 56'; Qamar 65'	Report	Hager 10', 37'; York 29'; Evans 50'

12 June 1989
15:30

West Germany	2–1	Great Britain
Blöcher 13'; Fischer 31'	Report	R. Thompson 42'

13 June 1989
16:30

Netherlands	3–2	Pakistan
Bovelander 13', 27', 49'	Report	Zahid 31'; Feroz 50'

13 June 1989
18:30

India	2–3	Australia
Jagbir 13'; Sujit 48'	Report	Hager 7', 26'; Reid 47'

14 June 1989
15:30

West Germany	1–2	Netherlands
Fischer 21'	Report	Crucq 42'; Poortenaar 43'

14 June 1989
17:30

Great Britain	1–2	Australia
N. Thompson 7'	Report	Hawgood 43'; Corbitt 45'

14 June 1989
19:30

India	0–1	Pakistan
	Report	Qamar 24'

16 June 1989
16:30

Netherlands	4–1	India
Bovelander 24', 46'; Diepeveen 48'; Van 't Hek 53'	Report	Jagbir 14'

16 June 1989
18:30

Great Britain	1–2	Pakistan
Kerly 47'	Report	Zahid 11'; Bhopali 27'

17 June 1989
14:00

West Germany	1–1	Australia
Fischer 27'	Report	York 8'

17 June 1989
17:00

India	1–2	Great Britain
Sujit 58'	Report	R. Thompson 42'; Leman 56'

18 June 1989
11:50

Netherlands	1–2	Australia
Bovelander 32'	Report	Hawgood 20'; Hager 22'

18 June 1989
13:50

West Germany	4–1	Pakistan
Fischer 23', 52', 58'; Hilgers 32'	Report	Qamar 60'

== Goalscorers ==
There were 55 goals scored in 15 matches, for an average of 3.67 goals per match.

7 goals

- (West Germany) Carsten Fischer

6 goals

- (Netherlands) Floris Bovelander

5 goals

- (Australia) Mark Hager

3 goals

- (Pakistan) Muhammad Qamar Ibrahim
- (Pakistan) Sharif Zahid

2 goals

- (Australia) Neil Hawgood
- (Australia) Michael York
- (United Kingdom) Rob Thompson
- (India) Sujit Kumar
- (India) Jagbir Singh
- (Pakistan) Waseem Feroz
- (West Germany) Michael Hilgers

1 goal

- (Australia) Greg Corbitt
- (Australia) Dean Evans
- (Australia) Graham Reid
- (United Kingdom) Sean Kerly
- (United Kingdom) Richard Leman
- (United Kingdom) Nick Thompson
- (India) Mukesh Kumar
- (India) Jude Felix Sebastian
- (India) Mohinder Pal Singh
- (Netherlands) Jacques Brinkman
- (Netherlands) Maurits Crucq
- (Netherlands) Marc Delissen
- (Netherlands) Cees Diepeveen
- (Netherlands) Tom van 't Hek
- (Netherlands) Bastiaan Poortenaar
- (Pakistan) Arif Bhopali
- (West Germany) Stefan Blocher

Source: FIH

== See also ==
- 1989 Women's Hockey Champions Trophy
