= 1990 BMW Seven Nations Trophy =

International field hockey competition

1990 BMW Trophy
BMW Seven Nations Amsterdam

Tournament details
- Host country: Netherlands
- City: Amsterdam
- Dates: 16 - 24 June 1990
- Teams: 7 (from 3 confederations)
- Venue(s): Wagener Stadium

Final positions
- Champions: Australia
- Runner-up: Pakistan
- Third place: Netherlands

Tournament statistics
- Matches played: 21
- Goals scored: 92 (4.38 per match)
- Top scorer(s): (India) Jagbir Singh (6 goals)
- Best player: (Pakistan) Shahbaz Ahmed

The 1990 BMW Trophy was an international field hockey competition played in Amsterdam. The tournament was sponsored by BMW, seven nations participated in a round-robin format playing against each other once. The tournament was played from 16 June to 24 June with Australia securing win over India on the final day to seal their title victory. Australia were tied on 9 points with Pakistan with equal goal difference but finished ahead of them on greater number of goals scored, Australia scored 20 goals to Pakistan's 18 goal.

== Participating teams ==
The following seven teams participated in the tournament on invitational basis, shown with their best results at the last World Cup (WC) and Olympics (OLY).

- Europe (4)
  - Netherlands (hosts) (WC:1st; OLY:3rd)
  - West Germany (WC:4th; OLY:2nd)
  - Great Britain (WC:DNP; OLY:1st)
  - Spain (WC:8th; OLY:9th)
- Asia (2)
  - India (WC:10th; OLY:6th)
  - Pakistan (WC:2nd; OLY:5th)
- Oceania (1)
  - Australia (WC:3rd; OLY:4th)

== Results ==
=== Table ===
Pos	Team	Pld	W	D	L	GF	GA	GD	Pts	Qualification
1	Australia (C)	6	4	1	1	20	14	+6	9	Champions
2	Pakistan	6	4	1	1	18	12	+6	9	Runner-ups
3	Netherlands	6	4	0	2	11	8	+3	8	Third place
4	West Germany	6	3	1	2	12	11	+1	7	
5	India	6	2	1	3	14	17	-3	5	
6	Great Britain	6	1	0	5	8	14	-6	2	
7	Spain	6	0	2	4	9	16	-7	2	

Rules for classification: a) points b) goal difference c) goals for d) head-to-head

All times are in local standard

==== Fixtures ====
16 June
13:00

Pakistan	4 - 1	Spain
Feroz 22'; Qamar 48'; Mohib 51'; Zaman 55'	Report	Escudé 13'

16 June
15:00

Netherlands	3 - 1	India
Parlevliet 10', 30'; Delissen 13'	Report	Prakash 12'

17 June
11:00

West Germany	3 - 3	Spain
Brinkmann 18'; Ness 33'; Mollandin 62'	Report	Xavier 12'; Escudé 46'; Usoz 65'

17 June
13:00

Great Britain	1 - 2	India
Hill 57'	Report	Jagbir 42', 47'

17 June
15:00

Netherlands	2 - 3	Australia
Bovelander 32'; Delissen 68'	Report	Reid 6'; Stacy 25'; Corbitt 51'

18 June
17:00

Great Britain	1 - 3	Australia
Kirkwood 25'	Report	Wansbrough 6'; Hager 17'; Stacy 37'

18 June
19:00

West Germany	0 - 1	Pakistan
	Report	Bashir 49'

19 June
17:00

Netherlands	3 - 2	Spain
Bovelander 5', 12'; Weterings 63'	Report	Escudé 34', 51'

19 June
19:00

India	4 - 2	Pakistan
Pillay 15', 45'; Prakash 21'; Pargat 56'	Report	Bashir 61'; Qamar 64'

20 June
15:00

Australia	2 - 1	Spain
Davies 42'; Reid 55'	Report	Usoz 9'

20 June
17:00

Great Britain	1 - 2	West Germany
Thompson 58'	Report	Mikloweit 42'; Reck 56'

21 June
15:00

Australia	4 - 4	Pakistan
Stacy 1'; Corbitt 16'; Birmingham 22'; Reid 27'	Report	Farhat 31'; Qamar 47'; Zaman 65'; Mohib 69'

21 June
17:00

Netherlands	1 - 0	Great Britain
Weterings 28'	Report

21 June
19:00

India	3 - 4	West Germany
Rai 23'; Jagbir 42'; Arif 53'	Report	Ness 17'; Keller 33'; Becker 37', 44'

22 June
17:00

India	1 - 1	Spain
Jagbir 57'	Report	Iglesias 63'

22 June
19:00

Netherlands	1 - 2	Pakistan
Weterings 46'	Report	Zaman 30', 60'

23 June
17:00

West Germany	3 - 2	Australia
Saliger 10', 11'; Ness 63'	Report	Stacy 42'; Birmingham 64'

23 June
19:00

Great Britain	3 - 1	Spain
Thompson 39', 65'; Williams 66'	Report	Escudé 53'

24 June
15:00

Netherlands	1 - 0	West Germany
Bovelander 16'	Report

24 June
17:00

India	3 - 6	Australia
Rai 7'; Jagbir 10', 67'	Report	Wansbrough 9'; Stacy 21'; Hager 23', 24', 56'; Reid 46'

24 June
19:00

Great Britain	2 - 5	Pakistan
Hill 43'; Potter 59'	Report	Zaman 2'; Sharif 19'; Musaddiq 28', 50'; Qamar 56'

== Statistics ==
=== Goalscorers ===
There were 92 goals scored in 21 matches with an average of 4.38 goals per match

6 goals

- (India) Jagbir Singh

5 goals

- (Spain) Ignacio Escudé
- (Pakistan) Tahir Zaman
- (Australia) Jay Stacy

4 goals

- (Pakistan) Qamar Ibrahim
- (Australia) Mark Hager
- (Netherlands) Floris Jan Bovelander
- (Australia) Graham Reid

3 goals

- (Netherlands) Gijs Weterings
- (West Germany) Frederick Ness
- (United Kingdom) Nick Thompson

2 goals

- (Netherlands) Erik Parlevliet
- (Pakistan) Qazi Mohib
- (Netherlands) Marc Delissen
- (Pakistan) Khalid Bashir
- (West Germany) Stefan Saliger
- (India) Dhanraj Pillay
- (Australia) Warren Birmingham
- (Pakistan) Musaddiq Hussain
- (West Germany) Andreas Becker
- (India) Ram Prakash Singh
- (United Kingdom) Rob Hill
- (India) Jagdev Singh Rai
- (Spain) Pablo Usoz
- (Australia) Gregory Corbitt
- (Australia) David Wansbrough

1 goal

- (Pakistan) Wasim Feroz
- (Spain) Xavier Escudé
- (West Germany) Thomas Brinkmann
- (West Germany) Andreas Mollandin
- (United Kingdom) Jimmy Kirkwood
- (India) Pargat Singh
- (Australia) Stephen Davies
- (India) Mohammed Arif
- (Spain) José Antonio Iglesias
- (West Germany) Thorsten Mikloweit
- (West Germany) Thomas Reck
- (Pakistan) Farhat Hassan Khan
- (West Germany) Andreas Keller
- (United Kingdom) Donald Williams
- (United Kingdom) Jon Potter
- (Pakistan) Zahid Sharif
