= Field hockey at the 1988 Summer Olympics – Men's tournament =

Men's field hockey at the 1988 Summer Olympics
- Olympic field hockey

Tournament details
- Host country: South Korea
- City: Seoul
- Dates: 18 September – 1 October
- Teams: 12 (from 5 confederations)
- Venue: Seongnam Stadium

Final positions
- Champions: Great Britain (3rd title)
- Runner-up: West Germany
- Third place: Netherlands

Tournament statistics
- Matches played: 42
- Goals scored: 163 (3.88 per match)
- Top scorer: (Netherlands) Floris Jan Bovelander (9 goals)

The men's field hockey tournament at the 1988 Summer Olympics was the 16th edition of the field hockey event for men at the Summer Olympics. It was held from 18 September to 1 October 1988.

Great Britain beat West Germany 3–1 in the final to win their third Olympic gold medal. The Netherlands won the bronze medal by defeating Australia 2–1.

== Umpires ==
- K Bajwa (PAK)
- Amarjit Bawa (IND)
- Santiago Deo (ESP)
- Adriano de Vecchi (ITA)
- Amjarit Dhak (KEN)
- A Gantz (CHI)
- Louismichel Gillet (FRA)
- Richard Kentwell (USA)
- Rob Lathouwers (NED)
- Craig Madden (SCO)
- Graham Nash (ENG)
- Don Prior (AUS)
- Alain Renaud (FRA)
- Eduardo Ruiz (ARG)
- Iwo Sakaida (JPN)
- Claude Seidler (FRG)
- Nikolai Stepanov (URS)
- Patrick van Beneden (BEL)

== Preliminary round ==
=== Group A ===
Pos	Team	Pld	W	D	L	GF	GA	GD	Pts	Qualification
1	Australia	5	5	0	0	19	3	+16	10	Semi-finals
2	Netherlands	5	3	1	1	12	6	+6	7	Semi-finals
3	Pakistan	5	3	0	2	15	8	+7	6	5–8th place semi-finals
4	Argentina	5	2	0	3	8	12	−4	4	5–8th place semi-finals
5	Spain	5	1	1	3	6	10	−4	3	9–12th place semi-finals
6	Kenya	5	0	0	5	5	26	−21	0	9–12th place semi-finals

Source: FIH

18 September 1988
10:45

Pakistan	5–1	Spain
Qamar 42', 59'; Zahid 44', 51'; Tariq 61'	Report	Peón 23'

Umpires:
Graham Nash (ENG)
Nikolai Stepanov (URS)

18 September 1988
13:30

Netherlands	5–1	Argentina
Bovelander 11', 20'; Parlevliet 41'; Van den Honert 56'; Delissen 65'	Report	Geneyro 17'

Umpires:
Alain Renaud (FRA)
Amarjit Bawa (IND)

18 September 1988
15:15

Australia	7–1	Kenya
Birmingham 12', 25'; Wansbrough 34'; Hager 39', 56', 65'; Batch 61'	Report	Goyal 58'

Umpires:
Claude Seidler (FRG)
Adriano de Vecchi (ITA)

20 September 1988
10:45

Australia	4–0	Argentina
Birmingham 1'; Hager 26', 55'; Hawgood 37'	Report

Umpires:
Craig Madden (SCO)
Nikolai Stepanov (URS)

20 September 1988
13:30

Netherlands	1–1	Spain
Kooijman 54'	Report	I. Escudé 69'

Umpires:
Claude Seidler (FRG)
A Gantz (CHI)

20 September 1988
15:15

Pakistan	8–0	Kenya
Tariq 8', 9', 47', 52'; Qazi 16'; Zahid 33'; Shahbaz 64', 66'	Report

Umpires:
Iwo Sakaida (JPN)
Louismichel Gillet (FRA)

22 September 1988
09:00

Pakistan	2–1	Argentina
Shahbaz 23'; Zahid 60'	Report	Mascheroni 68'

Umpires:
Craig Madden (SCO)
Amarjit Bawa (IND)

22 September 1988
13:30

Kenya	2–4	Spain
Okoth 34'; Matharu 40'	Report	Oliva 17'; Jv. Escudé 20'; De Paz 24'; I. Escudé 45'

Umpires:
Patrick van Beneden (BEL)
Richard Kentwell (USA)

22 September 1988
15:15

Australia	3–2	Netherlands
Hawgood 2'; Hager 6'; Batch 52'	Report	Bovelander 58', 67'

Umpires:
Claude Seidler (FRG)
Graham Nash (ENG)

24 September 1988
10:45

Netherlands	2–1	Kenya
Bovelander 29'; Van den Honert 39'	Report	Matharu 70'

Umpires:
Graham Nash (ENG)
Amarjit Bawa (IND)

24 September 1988
13:30

Australia	4–0	Pakistan
Hager 9'; Bestall 23'; Hawgood 31', 32'	Report

Umpires:
Alain Renaud (FRA)
Patrick van Beneden (BEL)

24 September 1988
15:15

Argentina	1–0	Spain
Verga 36'	Report

Umpires:
Adriano de Vecchi (ITA)
A Gantz (CHI)

26 September 1988
09:00

Australia	1–0	Spain
Stacy 53'	Report

Umpires:
Craig Madden (SCO)
Nikolai Stepanov (URS)

26 September 1988
13:30

Argentina	5–1	Kenya
Mascheroni 8'; Pailos 42'; Ferrara 44'; Verga 47'; Minadeo 63'	Report	Alubaha 32'

Umpires:
Claude Seidler (FRG)
Patrick van Beneden (BEL)

26 September 1988
15:15

Netherlands	2–0	Pakistan
Bovelander 2', 31'	Report

Umpires:
Louismichel Gillet (FRA)
Iwo Sakaida (JPN)

=== Group B ===
Pos	Team	Pld	W	D	L	GF	GA	GD	Pts	Qualification
1	West Germany	5	4	1	0	13	3	+10	9	Semi-finals
2	Great Britain	5	3	1	1	12	5	+7	7	Semi-finals
3	India	5	2	1	2	9	7	+2	5	5–8th place semi-finals
4	Soviet Union	5	2	1	2	5	10	−5	5	5–8th place semi-finals
5	South Korea (H)	5	0	2	3	5	10	−5	2	9–12th place semi-finals
6	Canada	5	0	2	3	3	12	−9	2	9–12th place semi-finals

Source: FIH
(H) Hosts

18 September 1988
09:00

Soviet Union	1–0	India
Davydov 6'	Report

Umpires:
Don Prior (AUS)
Eduardo Ruiz (ARG)

18 September 1988
13:30

West Germany	3–1	Canada
Fisher 23'; Blöcher 29'; Reck 50'	Report	Gifford 8'

Umpires:
K Bajwa (PAK)
Ron Lathouwers (NED)

18 September 1988
15:15

Great Britain	2–2	South Korea
Kerly 26'; Barber 39'	Report	Kim Jong-kap 44'; Kim Man-whe 52'

Umpires:
Santiago Deo (ESP)
Louismichel Gillet (FRA)

20 September 1988
09:00

Great Britain	3–0	Canada
Sherwani 3'; Barber 40'; Dodds 63'	Report

Umpires:
Patrick van Beneden (BEL)
Amjarit Dhak (KEN)

20 September 1988
13:30

West Germany	1–1	India
Hilgers 39'	Report	Sebastian 31'

Umpires:
Santiago Deo (ESP)
Alain Renaud (FRA)

20 September 1988
15:15

Soviet Union	3–1	South Korea
Davydov 17'; Boukatine 57'; Deputatov 59'	Report	Yoo Seung-jin 23'

Umpires:
Rob Lathouwers (NED)
Richard Kentwell (USA)

22 September 1988
10:45

South Korea	1–3	India
Kim Young-joon 16'	Report	T. Singh 55', 60'; Sebastian 58'

Umpires:
Santiago Deo (ESP)
Iwo Sakaida (JPN)

22 September 1988
13:30

Soviet Union	0–0	Canada
	Report

Umpires:
A Gantz (CHI)
K Bajwa (PAK)

22 September 1988
15:15

Great Britain	1–2	West Germany
Barber 2'	Report	Fischer 59'; Blöcher 69'

Umpires:
Don Prior (AUS)
Eduardo Ruiz (ARG)

24 September 1988
09:00

West Germany	1–0	South Korea
Fischer 62'	Report

Umpires:
Louismichel Gillet (FRA)
K Bajwa (PAK)

24 September 1988
13:30

Great Britain	3–1	Soviet Union
Kerly 40', 42'; Barber 58'	Report	Boukatine 68'

Umpires:
Rob Lathouwers (NED)
Eduardo Ruiz (ARG)

24 September 1988
15:15

Canada	1–5	India
Rutledge 22'	Report	M. Singh 11', 29'; Sebastian 32'; Fernandis 55'; Baladadalaisah 56'

Umpires:
Amjarit Dhak (KEN)
Iwo Sakaida (JPN)

26 September 1988
10:45

West Germany	6–0	Soviet Union
Mollandin 5'; Blöcher 19'; Dopp 41'; Fischer 45'; Keller 53'; Hilgers 59'	Report

Umpires:
Don Prior (AUS)
Amjarit Dhak (KEN)

26 September 1988
13:30

Great Britain	3–0	India
Barber 37'; Kerly 46'; Potter 50'	Report

Umpires:
Alain Renaud (FRA)
Adriano de Vecchi (ITA)

26 September 1988
15:15

Canada	1–1	South Korea
Sandhu 19'	Report	Chung Kye-suk 12'

Umpires:
Richard Kentwell (USA)
Rob Lathouwers (NED)

== Classification round ==
=== Ninth to twelfth place classification ===
9–12th place semi-finals
28 September
Spain	2
Canada	0
28 September
South Korea (a.e.t.)	5
Kenya	2

Ninth place game
29 September
Spain	2
South Korea	0
Eleventh place game
29 September
Canada	3
Kenya	1

==== 9–12th place semi-finals ====
28 September 1988
09:00

Spain	2–0	Canada
I. Escudé 15'; Ji. Escudé 46'	Report

Umpires:
Don Prior (AUS)
Adriano de Vecchi (ITA)

28 September 1988
09:00

South Korea	5–2 (a.e.t.)	Kenya
Han Jin-soo 10', 71'; Yoo Seung-jin 15', 76'	Report	Alubaha 13'; Matharu 49'

Umpires:
Graham Nash (ENG)
Iwo Sakaida (JPN)

==== Eleventh place game ====
29 September 1988
15:15

Canada	3–1	Kenya
Sandhu 17'; Porritt 24'; Rutledge 31'	Report	Akatsa 44'

Umpires:
Nikolai Stepanov (URS)
Richard Kentwell (USA)

==== Ninth place game ====
29 September 1988
13:00

Spain	2–0	South Korea
Escudé 14'; Peón 41'	Report

Umpires:
K Bajwa (PAK)
Craig Madden (SCO)

=== Fifth to eighth place classification ===
5–8th place semi-finals
28 September
India (p.s.o.)	6 (4)
Argentina	6 (3)
28 September
Pakistan	1
Soviet Union	0

Fifth place
30 September
India	1
Pakistan	2
Seventh place
30 September
Soviet Union	4
Argentina	1

==== 5–8th place semi-finals ====
28 September 1988
11:00

India	6–6 (a.e.t.)	Argentina
M. Singh 15', 25'; Fernandis 23', 26'; B. Singh 38'; Mohamed 80'	Report	Geneyro 21', 48', 90'; Ferrara 33'; Mascheroni 56'; Garraffo
Penalties
Kumar (penalty shoot-out missed); Felix (penalty shoot-out scored); V. Singh (penalty shoot-out missed); Fernandis (penalty shoot-out scored); B. Singh (penalty shoot-out scored); B. Singh (penalty shoot-out scored)	4–3	(penalty shoot-out missed) Mascheroni; (penalty shoot-out scored) Siri; (penalty shoot-out missed) Altube; (penalty shoot-out scored) Geneyro; (penalty shoot-out scored) Ferrara; (penalty shoot-out missed) Altube

Umpires:
Patrick van Beneden (BEL)
Rob Lathouwers (NED)

28 September 1988
11:00

Pakistan	1–0	Soviet Union
Qazi 42'	Report

Umpires:
A Gantz (CHI)
Claude Seidler (FRG)

==== Seventh place game ====
30 September 1988
11:00

Soviet Union	4–1	Argentina
Tchetchenov 9'; Myasnikov 21'; Pleshakov 39', 69'	Report	Verga 35'

Umpires:
Amjarit Dhak (KEN)
Amarjit Bawa (IND)

==== Fifth place game ====
30 September 1988
09:00

India	1–2	Pakistan
M. Singh 68'	Report	Musaddiz 22'; Qazi 50'

Umpires:
Eduardo Ruiz (ARG)
Graham Nash (ENG)

== Medal round ==
Semi-finals
28 September
West Germany	2
Netherlands	1
28 September
Australia	2
Great Britain	3

Gold medal match
1 October
West Germany	1
Great Britain	3
Bronze medal match
1 October
Australia	1
Netherlands	2

=== Semi-finals ===
28 September 1988
13:00

West Germany	2–1	Netherlands
Dopp 40'; Reck 47'	Report	Cruico 10'

Umpires:
Eduardo Ruiz (ARG)
Alain Renaud (FRA)

28 September 1988
15:15

Australia	2–3	Great Britain
Hager 45'; Hawgood 55'	Report	Kerly 19', 45', 67'

Umpires:
Santiago Deo (ESP)
Louismichel Gillet (FRA)

=== Bronze medal match ===
1 October 1988
13:00

Australia	1–2	Netherlands
Reid 62'	Report	Bovelander 24', 57'

Umpires:
Claude Seidler (FRG)
Alain Renaud (FRA)

=== Gold medal match ===
1 October 1988
15:15

West Germany	1–3	Great Britain
Dopp 59'	Report	Sherwani 20', 53'; Kerly 47'

Umpires:
Don Prior (AUS)
Santiago Deo (ESP)

== Statistics ==
=== Final standings ===
1. Great Britain
2. West Germany
3. Netherlands
4. Australia
5. Pakistan
6. India
7. Soviet Union
8. Argentina
9. Spain
10. South Korea
11. Canada
12. Kenya

=== Goalscorers ===
There were 163 goals scored in 42 matches, for an average of 3.88 goals per match.

9 goals

- (Netherlands) Floris Jan Bovelander

8 goals

- (Australia) Mark Hager
- (United Kingdom) Sean Kerly

5 goals

- (Australia) Neil Hawgood
- (United Kingdom) Paul Barber
- (India) Mohinder Pal Singh
- (Pakistan) Sheikh Tariq

4 goals

- (Argentina) Carlos Geneyro
- (Pakistan) Sharif Zahid
- (Spain) Ignacio Escude
- (West Germany) Carsten Fischer

3 goals

- (Argentina) Marcelo Mascheroni
- (Argentina) Alejandro Verga
- (Australia) Warren Birmingham
- (United Kingdom) Imran Sherwani
- (India) Mervyn Fernandis
- (India) Jude Felix Sebastian
- (Kenya) Inderjit Matharu
- (Pakistan) Mohib-Ur-Rehman Qazi
- (Pakistan) Ahmed Shahbaz
- (South Korea) Han Jin-soo
- (South Korea) Yoo Seung-jin
- (West Germany) Stefan Blocher
- (West Germany) Heiner Dopp

2 goals

- (Argentina) Fernando Ferrara
- (Australia) Colin Batch
- (Canada) Michael Rutledge
- (Canada) Hargurnek Sandhu
- (India) Thoiba Singh
- (Kenya) Lucas Alubaha
- (Netherlands) Taco van den Honert
- (Pakistan) Qamar Ibrahim
- (Soviet Union) Mikhail Bukatin
- (Soviet Union) Igor Davydov
- (Soviet Union) Sergei Pleshakov
- (Spain) Juan Carlos Peón
- (West Germany) Michael Hilgers
- (West Germany) Thomas Reck

1 goal

- (Argentina) Marcelo Garrafo
- (Argentina) Gabriel Minadeo
- (Argentina) Edgardo Pailos
- (Australia) John Bestall
- (Australia) Graham Reid
- (Australia) Jay Stacy
- (Australia) David Wansbrough
- (Canada) Chris Gifford
- (Canada) Trevor Porritt
- (United Kingdom) Richard Dodds
- (United Kingdom) Jon Potter
- (India) Subramani Baladadalaiash
- (India) Mohamed Shahid
- (India) Balwinder Singh
- (Kenya) Peter Akatsa
- (Kenya) Sanjiwan Goyal
- (Kenya) John Eliud Okoth
- (Netherlands) Maurits Crucq
- (Netherlands) Marc Delissen
- (Netherlands) Hendrik Jan Kooijman
- (Netherlands) Erik Parlevliet
- (Pakistan) Hussain Musaddiz
- (South Korea) Chung Kye-suk
- (South Korea) Kim Jong-kap
- (South Korea) Kim Man-whe
- (South Korea) Kim Young-joon
- (Soviet Union) Viktor Deputatov
- (Soviet Union) Alexandr Myasnikov
- (Soviet Union) Viatcheslav Tchetchenov
- (Spain) Miguel de Paz
- (Spain) Jaime Escude
- (Spain) Javier Escudé
- (Spain) Jorge Oliva
- (West Germany) Andreas Keller
- (West Germany) Andreas Mollandin

Source: FIH
