= 1994 Men's Hockey Champions Trophy =

Tournament details
- Host country: Pakistan
- City: Lahore
- Dates: 17–25 March
- Teams: 6
- Venue(s): National Hockey Stadium

Final positions
- Champions: Pakistan (3rd title)
- Runner-up: Germany
- Third place: Netherlands

Tournament statistics
- Matches played: 18
- Goals scored: 78 (4.33 per match)
- Top scorer(s): (Spain) Javier Arnau (9 goals)

The 1994 Men's Hockey Champions Trophy was the 16th edition of the Hockey Champions Trophy men's field hockey tournament. It took place from March 17–25, 1994 in the National Hockey Stadium in Lahore, Pakistan.

== Results ==
All times are Pakistan Time (UTC+05:00)

=== Pool ===
Team	Pld	W	D	L	GF	GA	GD	Pts
Pakistan	5	4	1	0	12	4	+8	9
Germany	5	3	2	0	8	5	+3	8
Australia	5	3	0	2	14	11	+3	6
Netherlands	5	1	2	2	13	12	+1	4
Spain	5	0	2	3	9	16	−7	2
Great Britain	5	0	1	4	8	16	−8	1

17 March 1994
10:00

Netherlands	4–4	Spain
Veen 9'; Van den Honert 24', 42'; Bovelander 52'	Report	Arnau 4', 45', 49', 61'

Umpires:
Gary Belder (AUS)
Amin Ayman (EGY)

17 March 1994
13:00

Germany	2–1	Australia
Becker 12'; Dorflinger 37'	Report	Birmingham 19'

Umpires:
Ali Khan Rashid (PAK)
Peter von Reth (NED)

17 March 1994
16:00

Great Britain	1–4	Pakistan
Garcia 25'	Report	Ashraf 2', 67'; Shahbaz 21', 58'

Umpires:
Jose Gortazar (ESP)
Sathasivan Yasudhasan (MAS)

18 March 1994
14:00

Australia	3–2	Netherlands
Stacy 7', 35'; Elmer 19'	Report	Van den Honert 2'; Bovelander 41'

Umpires:
Jose Gortazar (ESP)
Alistair McQuater (GBR)

18 March 1994
16:00

Spain	1–3	Pakistan
Garcia 40'	Report	Ashraf 12'; Zaman 55'; Shahbaz 67'

Umpires:
Peter von Reth (NED)
Roger St. Rose (TTO)

19 March 1994
14:00

Great Britain	0–1	Germany
	Report	Ness 54'

Umpires:
Gary Belder (AUS)
Rehman Masoodur (PAK)

20 March 1994
11:00

Pakistan	2–1	Netherlands
Ashraf 17'; Rana 60'	Report	Bovelander 66'

Umpires:
Jose Gortazar (ESP)
Alistair McQuater (GBR)

20 March 1994
14:00

Germany	3–2	Spain
Ness 29'; Meinhardt 49'; Moissl 70'	Report	Pujol 13', 20'

Umpires:
Roger St. Rose (TTO)
Sathasivan Yasudhasan (MAS)

20 March 1994
16:00

Australia	5–4	Great Britain
Corbitt 2', 4'; Davies 37'; Hager 44'; Stacy 64'	Report	Garcia 9', 12', 24', 46'

Umpires:
Peter von Reth (NED)
Amin Ayman (EGY)

21 March 1994
16:00

Pakistan	2–0	Australia
Ahmed 31'; Zaman 49'	Report

Umpires:
Roger St. Rose (TTO)
Peter von Reth (NED)

22 March 1994
12:00

Spain	1–1	Great Britain
Arnau 40'	Report	Williams 48'

Umpires:
Peter von Reth (NED)
Gary Belder (AUS)

22 March 1994
14:00

Germany	1–1	Netherlands
Ness 55'	Report	Van den Honert 52'

Umpires:
Jose Gortazar (ESP)
Alistair McQuater (GBR)

23 March 1994
11:00

Australia	5–1	Spain
Corbitt 26'; Bodimeade 30'; Lewis 59', 63'; Stacy 66'	Report	Arnau 57'

Umpires:
Peter von Reth (NED)
Sathasivan Yasudhasan (MAS)

23 March 1994
13:00

Netherlands	5–2	Great Britain
Van den Honert 28', 40', 46'; Van Wijk 31', 48'	Report	Nicklin 32'; Williams 63'

Umpires:
Jose Gortazar (ESP)
Amin Ayman (EGY)

23 March 1994
16:00

Pakistan	1–1	Germany
Zaman 45'	Report	Kunz 20'

Umpires:
Roger St. Rose (TTO)
Alistair McQuater (GBR)

=== Classification ===
==== Fifth and sixth place ====
25 March 1994
09:00

Spain	4–2	Great Britain
Arnau 30', 48', 54'; Garcia 51'	Report	Nicklin 40'; Williams 59'

Umpires:
Rehman Masoodur (PAK)
Ali Khan Rashid (PAK)

==== Third and fourth place ====
25 March 1994
11:30

Australia	2–2	Netherlands
Davies 27'; Stacy 56'	Report	Van den Honert 8'; Poortenaar 35'
Penalties
	6–7

Umpires:
Roger St. Rose (TTO)
Amin Ayman (EGY)

==== Final ====
25 March 1994
15:00

Pakistan	2–2	Germany
Shafqat 33'; Ahmed 39'	Report	Tewes 15'; Kunz 60'
Penalties
	5–4

Umpires:
Peter von Reth (NED)
Jose Gortazar (ESP)

== Final standings ==
1. Pakistan
2. Germany
3. Netherlands
4. Australia
5. Spain
6. Great Britain
