= Pakistan men's field hockey team in Europe in 1990 =

Pakistan field hockey team toured Europe in summer of 1990 from 17 June to 2 July to participate in the 1990 BMW Trophy in Netherlands and two-match test series against West Germany and Spain. Pakistan finished runners-up in the BMW Trophy, West Germany won the test series 2–0, and Pakistan won the test series against Spain 2–0.

== Netherlands ==
Full article: 1990 BMW Seven Nations Trophy

1990 BMW Trophy
BMW Seven Nations Amsterdam

Tournament details
- Host country: Netherlands
- City: Amsterdam
- Dates: 16 - 24 June 1990
- Venue: Wagener Stadium

The 1990 BMW Trophy was an international field hockey competition played in Amsterdam. The tournament was sponsored by BMW, Pakistan participated with six other teams in a round-robin format playing against each other once. The tournament was played from 16 June to 24 June.

=== Results ===
Match 1

16 June

Pakistan	4 – 1	Spain
Feroz 22'; Qamar 48'; Mohib 51'; Zaman 55'	Report	Escudé 13'

Match 2

18 June

West Germany	0 – 1	Pakistan
	Report	Bashir 49'

Match 3

19 June

India	4 – 2	Pakistan
Pillay 15', 45'; Prakash 21'; Pargat 56'	Report	Bashir 61'; Qamar 64'

Match 4

21 June
15:00

Australia	4 – 4	Pakistan
Stacy 1'; Corbitt 16'; Birmingham 22'; Reid 27'	Report	Farhat 31'; Qamar 47'; Zaman 65'; Mohib 69'

Match 5

22 June
19:00

Netherlands	1 – 2	Pakistan
Weterings 46'	Report	Zaman 30', 60'

Match 6

24 June

Great Britain	2 – 5	Pakistan
Hill 43'; Potter 59'	Report	Zaman 2'; Sharif 19'; Musaddiq 28', 50'; Qamar 56'

Table

Pos	Team	Pld	W	D	L	GF	GA	GD	Pts	Qualification
1	Australia (C)	6	4	1	1	20	14	+6	9	Champions
2	Pakistan	6	4	1	1	18	12	+6	9	Runner-ups
3	Netherlands	6	4	0	2	11	8	+3	8	Third place
4	West Germany	6	3	1	2	12	11	+1	7	
5	India	6	2	1	3	14	17	-3	5	
6	Great Britain	6	1	0	5	8	14	-6	2	
7	Spain	6	0	2	4	9	16	-7	2	

== West Germany ==
Pakistan men's field hockey team in Europe in 1990
	West Germany	Pakistan
- Dates: 26 June – 28 June

Test series
- Result: West Germany won the 2-match series 2–0

1st Test

26 June 1990

West Germany	4 – 3	Pakistan
Schmidt-Opper 8'; Hilgers 9', 45'; Becker 62'	Report	Saeed 30'; Mujahid 52'; Zaman 66'

Mülheim, West Germany

2nd Test

28 June 1990

West Germany	2 – 1	Pakistan
	Report

Munich, West Germany

== Spain ==
Pakistan men's field hockey team in Europe in 1990
	Spain	Pakistan
- Dates: 1 July – 2 July

Test series
- Result: Pakistan won the 2-match series 2–0

1st Test

1 July 1990

Spain	1 – 3	Pakistan
Casas 47'	Report	Musaddiq 10', 48'; Feroz 32'

Barcelona, Spain

2nd Test

2 July 1990

Spain	1 – 2	Pakistan
Usoz 66'	Report	Bashir 35'; Sharif 65'

Barcelona, Spain
