= Abudu (surname) =

Abudu is a surname. Notable people with the surname include:

- Juma Abudu (born 1963), Kenyan weightlifter
- Lariba Abudu (born 1966), Ghanaian politician
- Mo Abudu (born 1964), Nigerian media mogul
- Nancy Abudu (born 1974), American lawyer from Georgia
- Temidayo Abudu, Nigerian film producer
