= Thoiba Singh =

Thoiba Singh may refer to:

- Thoiba Singh Kshetrimayum (born 1955), Indian field hockey player
- Thoiba Singh Moirangthem (born 2002), Indian footballer
