= Thoiba =

Thoiba is a Meitei ethnic male given name, meaning conqueror, victorious, winner or successful. Notable people with the given name are:

- Thoiba Singh Moirangthem (born 2002), Indian footballer
- Kshetrimayum Thoiba Singh (born 1955), Indian field hockey player
