= Temidayo =

- Gender: masculine
- Language: Yoruba

Origin
- Origin: Nigeria
- Meaning: My story has become one of joy
- Region of origin: South-west Nigeria

Temidayo is a Yoruba masculine given name. It means "My story has become one of joy".

== People with the name ==
- Temidayo Abudu, Nigerian film producer
- Temidayo Isaiah Oniosun (born 1994), Nigerian scientist and businessman
- Omoniyi Temidayo Raphael (born 1994), Nigerian rapper and singer
- Bukayo Ayoyinka Temidayo Saka (born 2001), English footballer
