= John Okoth =

John Okoth may refer to:

- John Eliud Okoth, Kenyan field hockey player
- John Okoth (rugby union), Kenya rugby union player
