= A Night in 2005 =

2024 Nigerian drama film

- Promotional poster
- Directed by: Temidayo Abudu
- Written by: Temidayo Abudu
- Produced by: Inem King
- Starring: Ini Dima-Okojie: Efa Iwara; Bimbo Akintola; Ireti Doyle
- Edited by: Chinedum Iregbu
- Distributed by: Prime Video
- Release date: October 11, 2024
- Running time: 1h 56m
- Country: Nigeria
- Language: English

A Night in 2005 is a 2024 Nigerian drama film directed by Temidayo Abudu. It was announced on 14 September 2024 and was released on 11 October of the same year.

== Cast ==
- Ini Dima-Okojie
- Efa Iwara
- Bimbo Akintola
- Ireti Doyle
- Teniola Aladese
- Uzoamaka Power
- Taye Arimoro
- Laura Pepple
- Susan Pwajok
- Shamz Garuba
- Demi Banwo
- Olaiya Kayode Aderupoko
- Modesinuola Ogundiwin
- Timilehin Ojeola
- Inem King
- Harriet Akintola
- Daniella Peters
- Chris Akwarandu
- Esther Amanda-Jacob

== Reception ==
In a starred review by Open Country Mag, the film received 4 and half starts out of 5. In a rating of 8 out of 10, The Guardian wrote that the film "is a poignant and thought-provoking exploration of trauma, justice, and resilience", as well as praised Makanjuola's direction. According to BusinessDay, the film explores the themes of love, friendship, and family.
