= Kim Jae-cheon =

South Korean hockey player

Personal information
- Nationality: South Korean
- Born: 19 June 1968 (age 57)

Sport
- Sport: Field hockey

Kim Jae-cheon (born 19 June 1968) is a South Korean field hockey player. He competed in the men's tournament at the 1988 Summer Olympics.
