= Ranjit Rai =

Canadian hockey player

Personal information
- Nationality: Canadian
- Born: 8 April 1969 (age 57) India

Sport
- Sport: Field hockey

Ranjit Rai (born 8 April 1969) is an Indian-born Canadian field hockey player. He competed in the men's tournament at the 1988 Summer Olympics.
