= Jaime Armengold =

Spanish field hockey player (born 1961)

Personal information
- Nationality: Spanish
- Born: 24 January 1961 (age 65) Barcelona, Spain

Sport
- Sport: Field hockey

Jaime Armengold (born 24 January 1961) is a Spanish field hockey player. He competed in the men's tournament at the 1988 Summer Olympics.
