= Sergey Shakhvorostov =

Soviet hockey player

Personal information
- Nationality: Soviet
- Born: 16 May 1963 (age 62)

Sport
- Sport: Field hockey

Sergey Shakhvorostov (born 16 May 1963) is a Soviet field hockey player. He competed in the men's tournament at the 1988 Summer Olympics.
