= Miguel Rovira =

Spanish field hockey player (born 1962)

Personal information
- Nationality: Spanish
- Born: 7 November 1962 (age 63) Barcelona, Spain

Sport
- Sport: Field hockey

Miguel Rovira (born 7 November 1962) is a Spanish field hockey player. He competed in the men's tournament at the 1988 Summer Olympics.
