= Park Jae-sik =

South Korean hockey player

Personal information
- Nationality: South Korean
- Born: 15 March 1967 (age 59)

Sport
- Sport: Field hockey

Park Jae-sik (born 15 March 1967) is a South Korean field hockey player. He competed in the men's tournament at the 1988 Summer Olympics.
