= Andrew Deane =

Australian field hockey player

Personal information
- Nationality: Australian
- Born: 28 July 1967 (age 58)

Sport
- Sport: Field hockey

Andrew Deane (born 28 July 1967) is an Australian field hockey player. He competed in the men's tournament at the 1988 Summer Olympics.
