= Lee Heung-pyo =

South Korean hockey player

Personal information
- Nationality: South Korean
- Born: 1 October 1966 (age 59)

Sport
- Sport: Field hockey

Lee Heung-pyo (born 1 October 1966) is a South Korean field hockey player. He competed in the men's tournament at the 1988 Summer Olympics.
