= Eduardo Fábregas =

Spanish field hockey player (born 1963)

Personal information
- Nationality: Spanish
- Born: 12 December 1963 (age 62) Barcelona, Spain

Sport
- Sport: Field hockey

Eduardo Fábregas (born 12 December 1963) is a Spanish field hockey player. He competed in the men's tournament at the 1988 Summer Olympics.
