= Naeem Amjad =

Pakistani field hockey player (born 1965)

Personal information
- Nationality: Pakistani
- Born: 7 June 1965 (age 60) Sheikhupura, Pakistan

Sport
- Sport: Field hockey

Naeem Amjad (born 7 June 1965) is a Pakistani former field hockey player. He competed in the men's tournament at the 1988 Summer Olympics.
