= Samson Oriso =

Kenyan hockey player

Personal information
- Nationality: Kenyan
- Born: 23 January 1965 (age 61)

Sport
- Sport: Field hockey

Samson Oriso (born 23 January 1965) is a Kenyan field hockey player. He competed in the men's tournament at the 1988 Summer Olympics.
