= Jagdev Singh Rai =

Indian field hockey player (1969–2019)

Personal information
- Nationality: Indian
- Born: 8 July 1969
- Died: 18 December 2019 (aged 50)

Sport
- Sport: Field hockey

Jagdev Singh Rai (8 July 1969 – 18 December 2019) was an Indian field hockey player. He competed in the men's tournament at the 1992 Summer Olympics.
