= Paul Sewe Omany =

Kenyan hockey player

Personal information
- Nationality: Kenyan
- Born: 29 April 1965 (age 60)

Sport
- Sport: Field hockey

Paul Sewe Omany (born 29 April 1965) is a Kenyan field hockey player. He competed in the men's tournament at the 1988 Summer Olympics.
