= Kim Jong-gap =

South Korean hockey player

Personal information
- Nationality: South Korean
- Born: 4 January 1966 (age 60)

Sport
- Sport: Field hockey
Medal record
Men's field hockey
Representing South Korea
Asian Games
| Gold medal – first place | 1986 Seongnam | Team |

Kim Jong-gap (born 4 January 1966) is a South Korean field hockey player. He competed in the men's tournament at the 1988 Summer Olympics.
