= Dean Evans (field hockey) =

Australian field hockey player (born 1967)

Personal information
- Full name: Dean Michael Evans
- Born: 14 April 1967 (age 59)
Medal record
Men's field hockey
Representing Australia
Olympic Games
| Silver medal – second place | 1992 Barcelona | Team |
World Cup
| Gold medal – first place | 1986 London | Team |
| Bronze medal – third place | 1990 Lahore | Team |

Dean Michael Evans (born 14 April 1967) is a former field hockey player from Australia, who was a member of the team that won the silver medal at the 1992 Summer Olympics in Barcelona, Spain. Dean was also a member of the Australian Men's field hockey team in 1986 when they won gold at the World Cup for the first time.
