= Vyacheslav Chechenev =

Soviet hockey player (born 1959)

Personal information
- Nationality: Soviet
- Born: 19 September 1959 (age 66)

Sport
- Sport: Field hockey

Vyacheslav Chechenev (born 19 September 1959) is a Soviet field hockey player. He competed in the men's tournament at the 1988 Summer Olympics.
