= Samson Muange =

Kenyan hockey player

Personal information
- Nationality: Kenyan
- Born: 15 September 1961 (age 64)

Sport
- Sport: Field hockey

Samson Muange (born 15 September 1961) is a Kenyan field hockey player. He competed in the men's tournament at the 1988 Summer Olympics.
