= Rob Thompson (field hockey) =

British field hockey player (born 1965)

Personal information
- Born: 6 August 1965 (age 60) Blackdown, Warwickshire, England

Sport
- Sport: Field hockey
- Position: Forward
Senior career
Years	Team	Caps	Goals
1987–1996	Hounslow	-	-
1996–1999	Hampstead & Westminster	-	-
National team
Years	Team	Caps	Goals
–	England & Great Britain		-
Medal record
Men's field hockey
Representing England
European Championship
Bronze medal – third place	1995 Dublin	Team

Robert Patrick W. Thompson (born 6 August 1965) is a British former field hockey player who competed in the 1992 Summer Olympics.

== Biography ==
Thompson, born in Blackdown, Warwickshire, England, was educated at Lawrence Sheriff School.

He represented Warwickshire at county level and played club hockey for Hounslow Hockey Club in the Men's England Hockey League from 1987. In 1987, Thompson was capped for England after being called up for the 1987 Men's EuroHockey Nations Championship in Moscow.

In May 1989 he became the first player to score five goals for England in one match. While at his club Hounslow, he was selected for the 1992 Olympic Games in Barcelona.

Thompson became captain of Hounslow and was also selected for the 1996 Summer Olympics but was forced to miss them because of a serious ankle injury. After recovering from injury he joined Hampstead & Westminster as a player coach for the 1996–1997 season.
