= Niyati Roy-Shah =

Indian table tennis player

Personal information
- Nationality: Indian
- Born: 30 September 1965 (age 59)

Sport
- Sport: Table tennis

Niyati Roy-Shah (born 30 September 1965) is an Indian table tennis player. She competed at the 1988 Summer Olympics and the 1992 Summer Olympics.
