= Charles Oguk =

Kenyan field hockey player (1964–2020)

Personal information
- Nationality: Kenyan
- Born: 17 June 1964
- Died: 5 January 2020 (aged 55) Kakmie, Kenya

Sport
- Sport: Field hockey
- Club: Kisumu Simba Union; Kenya Police

Charles Oguk (17 June 1964 – 5 January 2020) was a Kenyan field hockey player. He competed in the men's tournament at the 1988 Summer Olympics.
