= Sean Kerly =

British field hockey player (born 1960)

Personal information
- Born: 29 January 1960 (age 66) Whitstable, Kent, England
- Height: 180 cm (5 ft 11 in)
- Weight: 80 kg (176 lb)

Sport
- Sport: Field hockey
- Position: Forward
Senior career
Years	Team	Caps	Goals
1980–1990	Southgate	-	-
1991–1994	Canterbury	-	-
National team
Years	Team	Caps	Goals
–	Great Britain	74	(57)
–	England	58	-
Medal record
Men's field hockey
Representing Great Britain
Olympic Games
Gold medal – first place	1988 Seoul	Team competition
Bronze medal – third place	1984 Los Angeles	Team competition
Champions Trophy
Bronze medal – third place	1984 Karachi	Team competition
Representing England
World Cup
Silver medal – second place	1986 London	Team competition
European Championship
Silver medal – second place	1987 Moscow	Team
Bronze medal – third place	1991 Paris	Team

Sean Robin Kerly MBE (born 29 January 1960) is an English former field hockey player who competed at three Olympic Games and won a gold medal in 1988.

== Biography ==
Kerly was born in Whitstable and was educated at Chatham House Grammar School in Ramsgate.

He played club hockey for Southgate Hockey Club in the Men's England Hockey League and in 1981, he made his England senior international debut.

At the 1984 Summer Olympics in Los Angeles, he helped Great Britain secure the bronze medal. Kerly scored the winning goal in the bronze medal match in LA against Australia (3-2). The success is attributed as having revived interest in hockey in Britain. Later that year he was part of the bronze medal winning Great Britain team that competed at the 1984 Men's Hockey Champions Trophy, in Karachi, Pakistan.

Two years later, at the 1986 Men's Hockey World Cup, Britain won the silver medal on home ground in London, with Kerly scoring four goals in the tournament.

After scoring a hat-trick against Pakistan in the 1987 Men's Hockey Champions Trophy and eight goals in one game during the 1987 European Club Cup he entered the 1988 Olympics as a well-known name in Britain. In 1988, he was a member of the gold medal-winning Great Britain and Northern Ireland squad at the 1988 Summer Olympics in Seoul. He scored a hat-trick in the semi-final against Australia before Britain defeated West Germany 3–1 in the final, with Kerly scoring once and Imran Sherwani twice.

Still at Southgate, he represented England at the 1990 Men's Hockey World Cup but made a surprise transfer to Canterbury Hockey Club for the 1991/92 season. He then represented Great Britain for the third time at the Olympics, participating at the 1992 Olympic Games in Barcelona.

Since retirement, he has also been involved in commentary for international hockey coverage on national television.
