= Victor Owino =

Kenyan hockey player

Personal information
- Nationality: Kenyan
- Born: 5 July 1968 (age 57)

Sport
- Sport: Field hockey

Victor Owino (born 5 July 1968) is a Kenyan field hockey player. He competed in the men's tournament at the 1988 Summer Olympics.
