= Mark Patterson (field hockey) =

Indian field hockey player

Personal information
- Nationality: Indian
- Born: 26 May 1969 (age 57) Mumbai, India

Sport
- Sport: Field hockey
Medal record
Representing India
Men's field hockey
Asian Games
Silver medal – second place	1990 Beijing	Team

Mark Patterson (born 26 May 1969) is an Indian field hockey player. He competed in the men's tournament at the 1988 Summer Olympics. Patterson was born in Mumbai to former Indian international goalkeeper Terence Patterson and is currently based in Perth, Australia.
