= Gundeep Kumar =

Indian field hockey player

Personal information
- Full name: Gundeep Kumar
- Nationality: Indian
- Born: 15 May 1965 (age 60) Jalandhar

Sport
- Sport: Field hockey

Gundeep Kumar (born 15 May 1965) is an Indian field hockey player. He competed in the men's tournament at the 1988 Summer Olympics.
