= Samuel Ngoyo =

Kenyan hockey player

Personal information
- Nationality: Kenyan
- Born: 16 January 1963 (age 63)

Sport
- Sport: Field hockey

Samuel Ngoyo (born 16 January 1963) is a Kenyan field hockey player. He competed in the men's tournament at the 1988 Summer Olympics.
