= Roy Odhier =

Kenyan hockey player

Personal information
- Nationality: Kenyan
- Born: 23 September 1964 (age 61)

Sport
- Sport: Field hockey

Roy Odhier (born 23 September 1964) is a Kenyan field hockey player. He competed in the men's tournament at the 1988 Summer Olympics.
