= Mikhail Bukatin =

Soviet hockey player (born 1963)

Personal information
- Nationality: Soviet
- Born: 28 December 1963 (age 62) Moscow, Russia

Sport
- Sport: Field hockey

Mikhail Bukatin (born 28 December 1963) is a Soviet field hockey player. He competed in the men's tournament at the 1988 Summer Olympics.
