= Sujay Ghorpade =

Indian table tennis player

Personal information
- Full name: Sujay Jashiwant Ghorpade
- Nationality: Indian
- Born: 10 January 1965 (age 60)

Sport
- Sport: Table tennis

Sujay Ghorpade (born 10 January 1965) is an Indian table tennis player. He competed at the 1988 Summer Olympics and the 1992 Summer Olympics.
