= Zahid Shareef =

Pakistani field hockey player

Personal information
- Born: Lahore

Sport
- Sport: Field hockey
- Position: Centre-Forward
Medal record

Zahid Shareef (born 11 October 1967) is a former Pakistani international hockey player who represented Pakistan from 1987 to 1991. During his playing career, he scored 41 goals in 73 matches. He is remembered for his exceptional dribbling skill. He was banned from the game in a controversial manner for six months. He retired from hockey in 1991. In February 2015, Shareef, who was working as a shift station manager at Allama Iqbal International Airport in Lahore, was arrested for alleged drugs smuggling.

== Early life ==
Born in Chauburji, Rajgarh, Lahore, Shareef developed a keen interest in sports, especially hockey. He has an elder brother and two younger siblings. Known for his dribbling skill, pinpoint passing and acceleration, he represented MAO College, where he caught the attention of the PHF scouts.

== Career ==
Shareef represented Pakistan in the Junior Hockey World Cup in 1985 in Canada, where his performance went unnoticed; however, he quickly climbed ranks in the Pakistan Hockey Squad. In 1987, after the visiting Netherlands team defeated Pakistan in the first two fixtures of the five-match series, Shareef was instrumental in the Dutch loss to National Bank of Pakistan team; that led to his inclusion in the Pakistan squad. His consistent performance in 1988 Champions Trophy, in which Pakistan won silver medal, led to his selection for the 1988 Seoul Olympics, in which Pakistan finished fifth, leading to a public backlash. However Shareef ended up 11th on the top scorer chart. In 1989 Men's champions trophy Shareef finished 4th as Top scorer. The Pakistan team, including Shareef, won a series against India and the Indira Gandhi Gold Cup held in India in 1989. Zahid Played in the 1990 Asian Games in which Pakistan finished first and he received a Gold Medal. Known for his hot-tempered persona on the field, he was banned for six months from every sort of hockey when he misbehaved with a referee He was unable to make a comeback in international sport.

== Playing style ==
Shareef was an attacking player, mostly playing either as centre-forward or inside left. He was known for his dribbling skill and clinical finishing. He also had good passing sense with superb acceleration. Throughout his career, he wore shirt number 10 and 16 although his favorite shirt was number 10.

== Arrest ==
On 8 February 2015, while working as a shift station manager at Lahore's Allama Iqbal International Airport, Pakistan's Anti Narcotics Force (ANF) arrested Shareef for alleged drug smuggling. It was alleged he had gone to the airport to hand over a bag containing heroin to a passenger who was bound for Doha.

== Health ==
Zahid claimed that he has several medical complications. He further blamed Shahbaz Ahmed (Ex-PHF secretary) for not conducting the promised Benefit match by Pakistan Hockey Federation that would help him.
