= Mohammed Shahid =

Indian field hockey player (1960–2016)

Personal information
- Born: 14 April 1960 Varanasi, Uttar Pradesh, India
- Died: 20 July 2016 (aged 56) Gurgaon, Haryana, India

Sport
- Sport: Field hockey
- Position: Forward
Senior career
Years	Team	Caps	Goals
–	Indian Railways	-	-
National team
Years	Team	Caps	Goals
1979–1989	India	167	(66)
Medal record
Men's field hockey
Representing India
Olympic Games
Gold medal – first place	1980 Moscow	Team
Asian Games
Silver medal – second place	1982 Delhi	Team
Bronze medal – third place	1986 Seoul	Team
Champions Trophy
Bronze medal – third place	1982 Amstelveen

Mohammed Shahid (14 April 1960 – 20 July 2016) was an Indian field hockey forward. He is considered one of India's best to have played the game and was known for his dribbling skills. He was a member of the Indian team that won the gold medal at the 1980 Olympic Games in Moscow. He was awarded Arjuna Award in 1980–1981 and Padma Shri in 1986.

== Career ==
Shahid was born on 14 April 1960 in Varanasi, Uttar Pradesh. He made his first appearance for India in the junior team in 1979 at the Junior World Cup in France. Shahid made his first senior team appearance the same year in a four-nation tournament in Kuala Lumpur under the captaincy of Vasudevan Baskaran, after his inclusion in the team following his impressive performance in the Aga Khan Cup.

During his playing days, Shahid was known for his running ability, dribbling of the ball and push which was as fast as a hard hit. His attacking partnership on the field with Zafar Iqbal was well known.

"Zafar at left-out and Shahid at right-in positions penetrated the best of the defences around the world with their superb understanding and passing of the ball. Zafar also pointed [out] that Shahid was instrumental in the V. Baskaran-led India winning the gold medal at the 1980 Olympic Games. “Shahid played a crucial role for India in that Olympics, otherwise we would have been [facing] difficulty,” Zafar, who was part of that team, pointed [out]."

He was awarded the 'Best Forward player' at the 1980 Champions Trophy in Karachi. He was a member of the team that won the gold at the 1980 Summer Olympics in Moscow, silver at the 1982 Asian Games and bronze at the 1986 Asian Games. He also played in the World Cup in Mumbai (then Bombay) in 1981–82, the Los Angeles Olympic Games in 1984 and the Seoul Games in 1988.

His skill and ability at the 1986 Seoul Asian Games earned him a place in the Asian All-Star team in 1986. He captained the Indian team during 1985–86. He announced his retirement from international hockey in January 1989.

His biggest contribution to the game of field hockey was the 'half push- half hit'- a stroke he used to hit the ball using the same grip used to dribble the ball. With the left hand on top of the handle and the right half low down around the centre of the stick he used to essay this shot with a minimum back lift and slam the ball towards his partner-teammate to make an early and accurate pass. The same stroke was adapted by his successor Dhanraj Pillay, who was an ardent fan of the maestro.

Shahid was the product of the Sports College Lucknow from where emerged a few other stars of the 1980s like Ravinder Pal Singh, his teammate at the Moscow Olympics (1980), Rajinder Singh Rawat who played in goal in the Los Angeles Olympics (1984) and many others who went on to don the national colours at the junior and senior international level. The Sports College and Hostels were the brainchild of another famous star of the 1950s Kunwar Digvijay Singh "Babu".

Later, he became a sports officer with the Indian Railways in Varanasi.

== Personal life ==
Shahid had six brothers and three sisters (he was the youngest brother), and his father ran a small hotel in Ardali Bazar area of Varanasi. He married Parvin in 1990, and had twins (son Saif and daughter Hina) from the marriage. in September 2025, his house was demolished.

=== Death ===
In June 2016, Shahid was admitted to Medanta hospital, Gurgaon when he was suffering from a serious liver disease. He was airlifted from Varanasi to Gurgaon after ignoring a bout of jaundice. His condition continued to deteriorate with weakening liver and kidneys. He died on 20 July in Gurgaon. His burial was held in hometown Varanasi the next day. His burial was attended by officials, local politicians of the city and Olympians including Zafar Iqbal, Ashok Kumar, Sujit Kumar, RP Singh, Shaqil Ahmed and Sardar Singh.

== Awards and recognition ==
- Arjuna Award (1980–81)
- Padma Shri (1986)
- Best player 1986 Men's Hockey World Cup
