= Juan Carlos Peón =

Spanish field hockey player (born 1963)

Juan Carlos Peón (born 19 April 1963) is a Spanish former field hockey player who competed in the 1984 Summer Olympics and in the 1988 Summer Olympics.
