= Vivek Singh (field hockey) =

Indian field hockey player

Personal information
- Nationality: Indian
- Born: 1 August 1967 Varanasi, India
- Died: 2 February 2007 (aged 39) Varanasi, India

Sport
- Sport: Field hockey
Medal record
Representing India
Men's field hockey
Asian Games
Silver medal – second place	1990 Beijing	Team

Vivek Singh (1 August 1967 – 2 February 2007) was an Indian field hockey player. He competed in the men's tournament at the 1988 Summer Olympics.
