= Erik Parlevliet =

Dutch field hockey player

Medal record

Men's field hockey

Representing the Netherlands

Olympic Games
Bronze medal – third place	1988 Seoul	Team competition

World Cup
Gold medal – first place	1990 Lahore	Team competition

Erik Robert Parlevliet (8 June 1964 – 22 June 2007) was a Dutch field hockey player, who earned a total number of 155 caps, scoring 47 goals.

== Life ==
Parlevliet was born in Zevenaar, Gelderland. With Holland he won the Hockey World Cup in 1990. He was a member of the Dutch national team at the 1988 Summer Olympics in Seoul, South Korea, where the team won a bronze medal.

Parlevliet also played for the Dutch in five Champions Trophy competitions.

He died in Rosmalen, aged 43.
