= Han Jin-su =

South Korean hockey player

Personal information
- Nationality: South Korean
- Born: 16 December 1965 (age 60) Seoul, South Korea

Sport
- Sport: Field hockey
Medal record
Men's field hockey
Representing South Korea
Asian Games
Gold medal – first place	1986 Seongnam	Team

Han Jin-su (born 16 December 1965) is a South Korean field hockey player. He competed in the men's tournament at the 1988 Summer Olympics.
