= Subramani Balada Kalaiah =

Indian hockey player

Personal information
- Nationality: Indian
- Born: 24 April 1962 (age 63) Kodagu (Coorg), Karnataka, India

Sport
- Sport: Field hockey

Subramani Balada Kalaiah (born 24 April 1962) is an Indian field hockey player. He competed in the men's tournament at the 1988 Summer Olympics.
