= Balwinder Singh (field hockey) =

Indian field hockey player

Personal information
- Nationality: Indian
- Born: 24 September 1965 (age 60) Amritsar, India

Sport
- Sport: Field hockey
Medal record
Representing India
Men's field hockey
Asian Games
Bronze medal – third place	1986 Seoul	Team

Balwinder Singh (born 24 September 1965) is an Indian field hockey player. He competed in the men's tournament at the 1988 Summer Olympics.
