= Thomas Brinkmann (field hockey) =

German field hockey player (born 1968)

Olympic medal record

Men's field hockey

Representing West Germany
Silver medal – second place	1988 Seoul	Team competition

Thomas Brinkmann (born 5 January 1968 in Duisburg) is a German former field hockey player who competed in the 1988 Summer Olympics.
