= John Bestall =

Australian field hockey player

Olympic medal record

Men's field hockey

Representing Australia
Silver medal – second place	1992 Barcelona	Team competition

John Roderick Bestall (born 25 February 1963) is a former field hockey player from Australia. He competed at both the 1988 Summer Olympics and the 1992 Summer Olympics, winning the silver medal with the Australian team in 1992.
