= Hendrik Jan Kooijman =

Dutch field hockey player

Personal information
- Born: 17 January 1960 (age 66)
Medal record
Men's Field hockey
Representing the Netherlands
Olympic Games
Bronze medal – third place	1988 Seoul	Team competition
World Cup
Gold medal – first place	1990 Lahore	Team competition

Hendrik Jan Kooijman (born 17 January 1960 in Velsen, North Holland) is a former Dutch field hockey player, who earned a total number of 154 caps, scoring seven goals for the Netherlands national field hockey team in the 1980s and early 1990s. Playing club hockey for HC Bloemendaal, the defender was a member of the bronze medal-winning Dutch team at the 1988 Summer Olympics in Seoul.
