= Temidayo Abudu =

Nigerian film producer and copywriter

- Abudu at the 2026 Toronto International Film Festival.
- Education: University College, London
- Occupation: Film producer
- Spouse: Adebola Makanjuola
- Mother: Mo Abudu

Temidayo Abudu is a Nigerian film producer, copywriter, and casting director. She is best known for producing the crime drama film titled Òlòtūré, and co-producing Chief Daddy with Mo Abudu.

== Education ==
Temidayo Abudu holds a bachelor's degree in Management and Marketing from Royal Holloway, University of London.

== Filmography ==
- Òlòtūré (2019)
- Chief Daddy (2018)
- The Royal Hibiscus Hotel (2017)
- A Night in 2005 (2024)

== Personal life ==
In 2019, Temidayo married Adebola Makanjuola in California, United States. They welcomed their first son in 2020.

== See also ==
- List of Yoruba people
- List of Nigerian film producers
