= Juma Abudu =

Kenyan weightlifter

Personal information
- Nationality: Kenyan
- Born: 11 November 1963 (age 61)
- Height: 1.70 m (5 ft 7 in)
- Weight: 59 kg (130 lb)

Sport
- Sport: Weightlifting

Juma Abudu (born 11 November 1963) is a Kenyan weightlifter. He competed in the 1988 Summer Olympics.
