= Inderjit Singh Matharu =

Kenyan field hockey player

Personal information
- Nationality: Kenyan
- Born: 1 September 1969 (age 56) Nairobi, Kenya

Sport
- Sport: Field hockey
- Club: Simba Union, Nairobi

Inderjit Singh Matharu (born 1 September 1969) is a Kenyan field hockey player. He competed in the men's tournament at the 1988 Summer Olympics.
