= Heiner Dopp =

Field hockey player

Personal information
- Born: 27 June 1956 (age 70) Bad Dürkheim, West Germany
- Height: 186 cm (6 ft 1 in)
- Weight: 81 kg (179 lb)

Sport
- Sport: Field hockey
Medal record
Men's Field Hockey
Representing West Germany
Olympic Games
Silver medal – second place	1984 Los Angeles	Team competition
Silver medal – second place	1988 Seoul	Team competition

Heiner Dopp (born 27 June 1956 in Bad Dürkheim, Rheinland-Pfalz) is a former field hockey player from West Germany, who competed at three Summer Olympics for his native country. He won the silver medal with his team, in 1984 (Los Angeles) and in 1988 (Seoul). Dopp made his Olympic debut in 1976 (Montreal).

He played 286 international matches for the national team, and won the German club title eight times with TG Frankenthal. After his hockey career he got engaged in local politics. In 1999 he became mayor of his home town Meckenheim.
