= Imran Sherwani =

British field hockey player (1962–2025)

Personal information
- Born: Imran Ahmed Khan Sherwani; 9 April 1962 Stoke-on-Trent, Staffordshire, England
- Died: 28 November 2025 (aged 63)
- Height: 178 cm (5 ft 10 in)
- Weight: 66 kg (146 lb)

Sport
- Sport: Field hockey
- Position: Winger
Senior career
Years	Team	Caps	Goals
1978–1982	North Stafford	-	-
1982–1984	Stourport	-	-
1984–1987	Stone	-	-
1987–1990	Stourport	-	-
1991–1992	Firebrands	-	-
1992–1995	Stourport	-	-
1996–2009	Leek	-	-
National team
Years	Team	Caps	Goals
–	Great Britain	45	-
–	England	49	-
Medal record
Men's field hockey
Representing Great Britain
Olympic Games
Gold medal – first place	1988 Seoul	Team
Representing England
Hockey World Cup
Silver medal – second place	1986 London	Team
European Championship
Silver medal – second place	1987 Moscow	Team

Imran Ahmed Khan Sherwani (9 April 1962 – 28 November 2025) was a British international field hockey player. He won gold with the Great Britain squad at the 1988 Summer Olympics in Seoul.

== Biography ==
Sherwani was born on 9 April 1962 in Stoke-on-Trent, Staffordshire, and was of Pakistani descent. Ever since he played in his first match at the age of 14, Sherwani dreamt of playing in the Olympic Games. His father played hockey for Pakistan and his great uncles played football for Stoke City and Port Vale. While at City of Stoke-on-Trent Sixth Form College, Sherwani was selected as the captain of the county U19 squad before progressing to England U18 and U21 teams.

Sherwani started his club hockey career at North Stafford Hockey Club but switched to play for Stourport in November 1982 in order to further his international career.

Sherwani made his England debut in 1983 and shared his hockey career working as a policeman. He missed out on a place at the 1984 Summer Olympics after requiring three knee operations. He joined Stone Hockey Club from Stourport for the 1984/85 season.

While at Stone, he won a silver medal with the England squad at the 1986 World Cup in London. Sherwani left the Staffordshire Police force as his training programme became heavier and became a newsagent like his father. He was voted the Hockey Writers' Club player of the year for 1986/87 and also played indoor hockey for Slough Hockey Club. At the end of 1987, Sherwani returned to play for Stourport and at the 1988 Olympics, he played on the left wing and scored two of the three goals against West Germany in the 1988 final, making a significant contribution to the match. In a BBC Sport article Imran Sherwani was quoted: "When we got back to Heathrow Airport it was bizarre for a hockey player to walk out to hundreds of cheering people. You see it with rugby and football but not usually hockey."

After his international retirement, Sherwani had been capped 45 times for Great Britain and 49 times for England.

Sherwani had a third spell at Stourport after a year with Firebrands. In October 1995, Stourport received a Lottery grant and this signalled the retirement of three of their players, including Sherwani.

In 1996, Imran started as player-coach at Leek Hockey Club, and within 8 years inspired the Club to go from Midlands Division 2 West to National League in 2003 and was also made a Life Member, Sherwani also served as Director of Hockey at Denstone College in Staffordshire.

He later worked as an independent financial adviser. and also had links with Cannock Hockey Club, where his three sons played, Sherwani was selected as one of the torchbearers for the 2012 Summer Olympics torch relay.

On 2 June 2021, Sherwani revealed that he had been diagnosed with early-onset Alzheimer's disease. He died on 28 November 2025, at the age of 63.
