= Tariq Sheikh =

Pakistani field hockey player

Medal record

Men's field hockey

Representing Pakistan

Olympic Games

Junior Hockey World Cup
Bronze medal – third place	1989 Ipoh	Team

Indira Gandhi Gold Cup
Gold medal – first place	1989	Team

Hockey World Cup
Silver medal – second place	1990 Lahore	Team

Champions Trophy
Silver medal – second place	1988 Lahore	Team

Tariq Sheikh (born 11 December 1968) is a field hockey player who remained a member of Pakistan National Hockey Team from 1983 to 1991. He was born at Sialkot Punjab. He is cousin of Shahnaz Sheikh and nephew of Zahid Sheikh . He played 1990 7th Hockey World Cup at Lahore and was silver medallist. He also played 1988 Seoul Olympics, 1988 Champions Trophy, Asian Games, Asia Cup and Azlan Shah. He is one of the best forward in field hockey.

In June 2010 he was appointed as an assistant coach of the Pakistan under-16 hockey team.
