= Igor Davydov =

Soviet field hockey player

Personal information
- Nationality: Soviet
- Born: 25 January 1966 (age 60)

Sport
- Sport: Field hockey

Igor Davydov (born 25 January 1966) is a Soviet field hockey player. He competed in the men's tournament at the 1988 Summer Olympics.
