= Bastiaan Poortenaar =

Dutch field hockey player (1968–2024)

Personal information
- Nationality: Dutch
- Born: 29 November 1968 Bilthoven, Netherlands
- Died: 21 May 2024 (aged 55)

Sport
- Sport: Field hockey
Medal record
Men's field hockey
Representing Netherlands
World Cup
| Silver medal – second place | 1994 Australia |
EuroHockey Championship
| Silver medal – second place | 1995 Ireland |

Bastiaan Poortenaar (29 November 1968 – 21 May 2024) was a Dutch field hockey player. He competed in the men's tournament at the 1992 Summer Olympics.

Poortenaar died from a cardiac arrest on 21 May 2024, at the age of 55.
