= Alejandro Verga =

Argentine field hockey player

Alejandro Verga (born 7 March 1959) is an Argentine former field hockey player who competed in the 1988 Summer Olympics.
