= Miguel de Paz =

Spanish field hockey player (born 1961)

Personal information
- Full name: Miguel de Paz Plá
- Born: 31 January 1961 (age 65)
Medal record
Men's field hockey
Representing Spain
Olympic Games
Silver medal – second place	1980 Moscow	Team competition

Miguel de Paz Plá (born 31 January 1961) is a former field hockey player from Spain, who won the silver medal with the Men's National Team at the 1980 Summer Olympics in Moscow. He competed in three consecutive Summer Olympics for Spain, starting in 1980.
