= Edgardo Pailos =

Argentine field hockey player

Personal information
- Born: August 15, 1967 (age 58)
Medal record
Men's field hockey
Representing Argentina
Pan American Games
| Gold medal – first place | 1991 Havana | Team |
| Gold medal – first place | 1995 Mar del Plata | Team |

Edgardo Pailos Rugna (born August 15, 1967) is a former field hockey player from Argentina. He competed for his native country at the 1996 Summer Olympics, where he finished in ninth place with the national squad. He won the gold medal at the 1995 Pan American Games, and made his Olympic debut at the 1988 Summer Olympics in Seoul, South Korea.
