= Lucas Alubaha =

Kenyan field hockey player

Personal information
- Nationality: Kenyan
- Born: 25 December 1958 (age 67)

Sport
- Sport: Field hockey

Lucas Alubaha (born 25 December 1958) is a Kenyan field hockey player. He competed at the 1984 Summer Olympics in Los Angeles, and at the 1988 Summer Olympics in Seoul.
