= Maurits Crucq =

Dutch field hockey player

Medal record

Men's field hockey

Representing the Netherlands

Olympic Games
Gold medal – first place	1996 Atlanta	Team competition
Bronze medal – third place	1988 Seoul	Team competition

World Cup
Gold medal – first place	1990 Lahore	Team competition

Maurits Bourgon Crucq (born 10 February 1968 in Voorburg, South Holland) is a former field hockey defender from the Netherlands, who played 132 international matches for the Dutch national team, in which he scored eleven goals. A player from HC Klein Zwitserland, Crucq twice won an Olympic medal: bronze in 1988 and gold in 1996.
