= Thomas Reck =

German hockey player (born 1964)

Olympic medal record

Men's field hockey

Representing West Germany
Silver medal – second place	1984 Los Angeles	Team competition
Silver medal – second place	1988 Seoul	Team competition

Thomas Werner Reck (born 16 January 1964 in Ulm) is a German former field hockey player who competed in the 1984 Summer Olympics and in the 1988 Summer Olympics.
