= Andreas Mollandin =

German field hockey player

Olympic medal record

Men's field hockey

Representing West Germany
Silver medal – second place	1988 Seoul	Team competition

Andreas Mollandin (born 4 August 1964 in Malmeneich) is a German former field hockey player who competed in the 1988 Summer Olympics.
