= Carlos Geneyro =

Argentine field hockey player

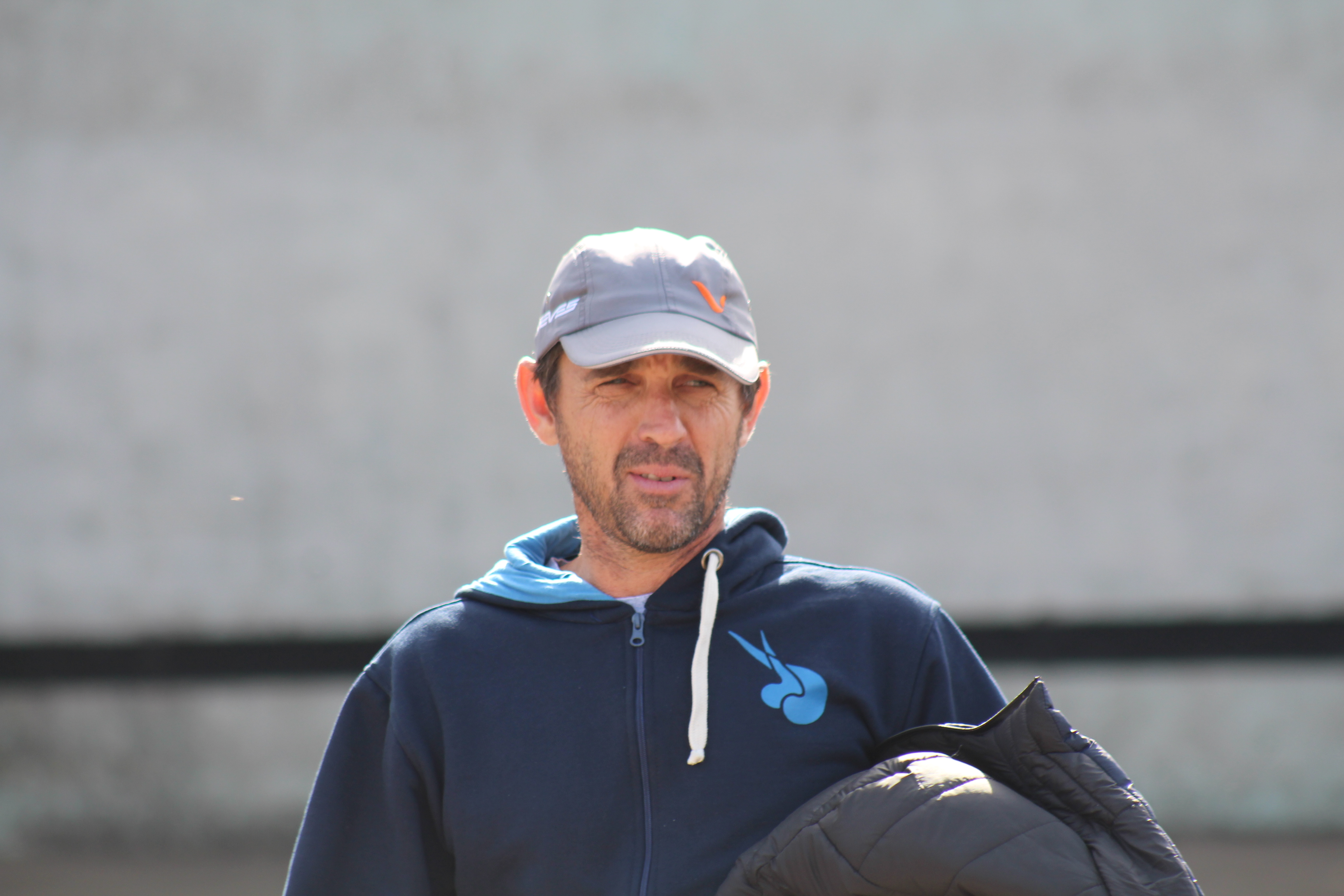
Carlos Geneyro

Carlos Geneyro (born 3 June 1966) is an Argentine former field hockey player who competed in the 1988 Summer Olympics and in the 1992 Summer Olympics.
