= Nick Sandhu =

Canadian field hockey player

Medal record

Men's field hockey

Representing Canada

Pan American Games
| Gold medal – first place | 1983 Caracas | Team |
| Gold medal – first place | 1987 Indianapolis | Team |
| Silver medal – second place | 1991 Havana | Team |

Hargurnek Singh Sandhu (born January 26, 1962, in Jamsher Khas, Jalandhar, Punjab, India), known as "Nick" or "Niki", is an Indian-born Canadian former field hockey defender.

Sandhu participated in two consecutive Summer Olympics for Canada, starting in 1984. After having finished in tenth position in Los Angeles, California, the resident of Vancouver, British Columbia, ended up in eleventh place without h the Men's National Team in the Seoul Games.

== International senior competitions ==
- 1984 – Olympic Games, Los Angeles (10th)
- 1988 – Olympic Games, Seoul (11th)
- 1990 – World Cup, Lahore (11th)
