= Mohinder Pal Singh =

Indian field hockey player

Personal information
- Nationality: Indian
- Born: 16 October 1962 (age 63) Meerut, India

Sport
- Sport: Field hockey
Medal record
Representing India
Men's field hockey
Asian Games
Bronze medal – third place	1986 Seoul	Team

Mohinder Pal Singh (born 16 October 1962) is an Indian field hockey player. He competed in the men's tournament at the 1988 Summer Olympics where he was high scorer for India scoring 5 goals.

== Personal life ==
His father was in Indian Army and he is an alumnus of the Guru Gobind Singh Sports College, Lucknow. His has only one child, a son who is international level golf player. As of 2025, Mohinder Pal Singh is living in college/university town of Saifai (in Uttar Pradesh) and teaching field hockey to the students of Major Dhyanchand Sports College, Saifai as a faculty member.
