= Peter Akatsa =

Kenyan field hockey player (1960–2023)

Personal information
- Nationality: Kenyan
- Born: 12 May 1960
- Died: 7 October 2023 (aged 63)

Sport
- Sport: Field hockey

Peter Akatsa (12 May 1960 – 7 October 2023) was a Kenyan field hockey player. He was part of the Kenya national field hockey team at the 1984 Summer Olympics in Los Angeles and at the 1988 Summer Olympics in Seoul. Following his athletic career, Akatsa dedicated over two decades to coaching and mentoring young individuals in Lexington, particularly at Lexington Christian Academy (LCA).

Akatsa died from colon cancer on 7 October 2023, at the age of 63.
