= Sanjiwan Goyal =

Kenyan hockey player

Personal information
- Nationality: Kenyan
- Born: 26 December 1964 (age 61)

Sport
- Sport: Field hockey

Sanjiwan Goyal (born 26 December 1964) is a Kenyan field hockey player. He competed in the men's tournament at the 1988 Summer Olympics.
