= Trevor Porritt =

Canadian field hockey player

- Born: May 24, 1961; Winnipeg, Manitoba
- Occupation: field hockey player

Trevor Porritt (born May 24, 1961, in Winnipeg, Manitoba) is a former Canadian field hockey player who played for the Canada men's national field hockey team from 1980 to 1988, including the 1984 and 1988 Summer Olympics. He was the top-scorer for the gold medalist team at the 1987 Pan American Games. Porritt was inducted into the Manitoba Sports Hall of Fame in 2000.

== International senior competitions ==
- 1983 – Pan American Games, Caracas (1st)
- 1984 – Olympic Games, Los Angeles (10th)
- 1987 – Pan American Games, Indianapolis (1st)
- 1988 – Olympic Games, Seoul (11th)
