= John Eliud Okoth =

Kenyan hockey player

Personal information
- Nationality: Kenyan
- Born: 12 December 1958 (age 67)

Sport
- Sport: Field hockey

John Eliud Okoth (born 12 December 1958) is a Kenyan field hockey player. He competed in the men's tournament at the 1988 Summer Olympics.
