= Miguel Altube =

Argentine field hockey player

Miguel Altube (born 6 May 1960) is an Argentine former field hockey player who competed in the 1988 Summer Olympics.
