= Jordi Oliva =

Spanish field hockey player (1959–2014)

Personal information
- Full name: Jordi Oliva Izquierdo
- Born: 30 May 1959; Terrassa, Barcelona, Spain
- Died: 1 December 2014 (aged 55); Terrassa, Barcelona, Spain
- Height: 168 cm (5 ft 6 in)
- Weight: 150 lb (68 kg)

Jordi Oliva Izquierdo (30 May 1959 – 1 December 2014) was a Spanish field hockey player who competed in the 1984 Summer Olympics and in the 1988 Summer Olympics.

Oliva is the father of field hockey players Georgina Oliva and Roc Oliva.
