= Sujit Kumar (field hockey) =

Indian hockey player

Personal information
- Nationality: Indian
- Born: 26 October 1962 (age 63)

Sport
- Sport: Field hockey

Sujit Kumar (born 26 October 1962) is an Indian field hockey player, who competed in the men's tournament at the 1988 Summer Olympics.
