= Alejandro Siri =

Argentine field hockey player (born 1963)

Personal information
- Full name: Alejandro Daniel Siri Pérez
- Born: December 17, 1963 (age 62)
Medal record
Men's field hockey
Representing Argentina
Pan American Games
Gold medal – first place	1991 Havana	Team
Silver medal – second place	1987 Indianapolis	Team

Alejandro Daniel Siri Pérez (born December 17, 1963) is a male former field hockey player from Argentina. He competed for his native country at two consecutive Summer Olympics, starting in 1988. Siri won a gold medal at the 1991 Pan American Games and a silver medal at the 1987 Pan American Games.
