= Stefan Blöcher =

German field hockey player (born 1960)

Personal information
- Born: 25 February 1960 (age 66) Wiesbaden, Hessen
- Height: 180 cm (5 ft 11 in)
- Weight: 76 kg (168 lb)

Sport
- Sport: Field hockey
Medal record
Men's Field Hockey
Representing West Germany
Olympic Games
Silver medal – second place	1984 Los Angeles	Team competition
Silver medal – second place	1988 Seoul	Team competition

Stefan Blöcher (born 25 February 1960 in Wiesbaden, Hessen) is a former field hockey player from (West-)Germany, who competed at two Summer Olympics for his native country. On both occasions he won the silver medal with his team, in 1984 (Los Angeles and in 1988 (Seoul).

Blöcher played 259 international matches for (West)-Germany, and made his debut in 1978. He won the German title twice, became European champion five times, and won the silver medal at the Hockey World Cup in 1982. In 1987 he was voted the World Hockey Player of the Year. After his hockey career he became a fanatic golf player.
