= Fernando Ferrara =

Argentine field hockey player

Fernando Ferrara (born 24 July 1968) is an Argentine former field hockey player who competed in the 1988 Summer Olympics, in the 1992 Summer Olympics, and in the 1996 Summer Olympics.
