= Hockey Champions Trophy =

International field hockey tournament

Hockey Champions Trophy (HCT)
- Most recent season or competition: 2018 Women's Hockey Champions Trophy
- Sport: Field hockey
- Founded: M: 1978; W: 1987
- Folded: 2018
- Replaced by: Men's FIH Pro League; Women's FIH Pro League
- No. of teams: 6
- Continent: FIH (International)
- Last champions: M:Australia (15th title); W:Netherlands (7th title)
- Most titles: M:Australia (15 titles); W:Argentina; Netherlands (7 titles each)

The Hockey Champions Trophy (HCT) was an international field hockey tournament held by the International Hockey Federation (FIH). It featured the top 6 ranked nations in that year.

== History ==
Founded in 1978 by Pakistan's Air Marshal Nur Khan and the Pakistan Hockey Federation, it featured the world's top-ranked field hockey teams competing in a round robin format. A biennial women's tournament was added in 1987. The Champions Trophy was changed from an annual to a biennial event from 2014 onwards, due to the introduction of the Hockey World League (HWL). The 2018 edition was the last edition of the Champions Trophy and the tournament was replaced by the Men's FIH Pro League and the Women's FIH Pro League in 2019.

In the men's tournament, Australia won the tournament fifteen times, Germany ten and the Netherlands eight times. Pakistan is the only Asian champion, with three titles to its name including the first two in 1978 and 1980. In the women's tournament, Argentina and the Netherlands won the trophy seven times each. Australia have won the trophy six times, while Germany, China and South Korea have won it one time each.

Since the 2011 edition, eight teams of each six have qualified for the championship. The first edition had five teams, the second had seven, 1987 had eight, and all other editions through 2010 had six. In the year following the Olympics or a World Cup, the participating teams include the host, the defending champion, the world champion and the next highest ranked teams from either the most recent World Cup or Olympic Games.

== Men ==
=== Summaries ===
Year	Hosts	Final			Third Place Match		
Year	Hosts	Winners	Score	Runners-up	Third Place	Score	Fourth Place
1978; Details	Lahore, Pakistan	Pakistan	RR	Australia	Great Britain	RR	New Zealand
1980; Details	Karachi, Pakistan	Pakistan	RR	West Germany	Australia	RR	Netherlands
1981; Details	Karachi, Pakistan	Netherlands	RR	Australia	West Germany	RR	Pakistan
1982; Details	Amstelveen, Netherlands	Netherlands	RR	Australia	India	RR	Pakistan
1983; Details	Karachi, Pakistan	Australia	RR	Pakistan	West Germany	RR	India
1984; Details	Karachi, Pakistan	Australia	RR	Pakistan	Great Britain	RR	Netherlands
1985; Details	Perth, Australia	Australia	RR	Great Britain	West Germany	RR	Pakistan
1986; Details	Karachi, Pakistan	West Germany	RR	Australia	Pakistan	RR	Great Britain
1987; Details	Amstelveen, Netherlands	West Germany	RR	Netherlands	Australia	RR	Great Britain
1988; Details	Lahore, Pakistan	West Germany	RR	Pakistan	Australia	RR	Soviet Union
1989; Details	Berlin, West Germany	Australia	RR	Netherlands	West Germany	RR	Pakistan
1990; Details	Melbourne, Australia	Australia	RR	Netherlands	Germany	RR	Pakistan
1991; Details	Berlin, Germany	Germany	RR	Pakistan	Netherlands	RR	Australia
1992 details	Karachi, Pakistan	Germany	4–0	Australia	Pakistan	2–1	Netherlands
1993; Details	Kuala Lumpur, Malaysia	Australia	4–0	Germany	Netherlands	6–2	Pakistan
1994; Details	Lahore, Pakistan	Pakistan	2–2 (7–6); Penalty strokes	Germany	Netherlands	2–2 (9–8); Penalty strokes	Australia
1995; Details	Berlin, Germany	Germany	2–2 (4–2); Penalty strokes	Australia	Pakistan	2–1	Netherlands
1996; Details	Madras, India	Netherlands	3–2	Pakistan	Germany	5–0	India
1997; Details	Adelaide, Australia	Germany	3–2; After extra time	Australia	Spain	2–1	Netherlands
1998; Details	Lahore, Pakistan	Netherlands	3–1	Pakistan	Australia	1–1 (8–7); Penalty strokes	South Korea
1999; Details	Brisbane, Australia	Australia	3–1	South Korea	Netherlands	5–2	Spain
2000; Details	Amstelveen, Netherlands	Netherlands	2–1; After extra time	Germany	South Korea	3–0	Spain
2001; Details	Rotterdam, Netherlands	Germany	2–1	Australia	Netherlands	5–2	Pakistan
2002; Details	Cologne, Germany	Netherlands	0–0 (3–2); Penalty strokes	Germany	Pakistan	4–3	India
2003; Details	Amstelveen, Netherlands	Netherlands	4–2	Australia	Pakistan	4–3	India
2004; Details	Lahore, Pakistan	Spain	4–2	Netherlands	Pakistan	3–2	India
2005; Details	Chennai, India	Australia	3–1	Netherlands	Spain	5–2	Germany
2006; Details	Terrassa, Spain	Netherlands	2–1	Germany	Spain	2–2 (5–4); Penalty strokes	Australia
2007; Details	Kuala Lumpur, Malaysia	Germany	1–0	Australia	Netherlands	3–2	South Korea
2008; Details	Rotterdam, Netherlands	Australia	4–1	Spain	Argentina	2–2 (5–3); Penalty strokes	Netherlands
2009; Details	Melbourne, Australia	Australia	5–3	Germany	South Korea	4–2	Netherlands
2010; Details	Mönchengladbach, Germany	Australia	4–0	England	Netherlands	4–1	Germany
2011; Details	Auckland, New Zealand	Australia	1–0	Spain	Netherlands	5–3	New Zealand
2012; Details	Melbourne, Australia	Australia	2–1; After extra time	Netherlands	Pakistan	3–2	India
2014; Details	Bhubaneswar, India	Germany	2–0	Pakistan	Australia	2–1	India
2016; Details	London, United Kingdom	Australia	0–0 (3–1); Penalty shoot-out	India	Germany	1–0	Great Britain
2018; Details	Breda, Netherlands	Australia	1–1 (3–1); Penalty shoot-out	India	Netherlands	2–0	Argentina

=== Successful national teams ===
Team	Titles	Runners-up	Third place	Fourth place
Australia	15 (1983, 1984, 1985*, 1989, 1990*, 1993, 1999*, 2005, 2008, 2009*, 2010, 2011, 2012*, 2016, 2018)	10 (1978, 1981, 1982, 1986, 1992, 1995, 1997*, 2001, 2003, 2007)	5 (1980, 1987, 1988, 1998, 2014)	3 (1991, 1994, 2006)
Germany^{^}	10 (1986, 1987, 1988, 1991*, 1992, 1995*, 1997, 2001, 2007, 2014)	7 (1980, 1993, 1994, 2000, 2002*, 2006, 2009)	7 (1981, 1983, 1985, 1989*, 1990, 1996, 2016)	2 (2005, 2010*)
Netherlands	8 (1981, 1982*, 1996, 1998, 2000*, 2002, 2003*, 2006)	6 (1987*, 1989, 1990, 2004, 2005, 2012)	9 (1991, 1993, 1994, 1999, 2001*, 2007, 2010, 2011, 2018*)	7 (1980, 1984, 1992, 1995, 1997, 2008*, 2009)
Pakistan	3 (1978*, 1980*, 1994*)	7 (1983*, 1984*, 1988*, 1991, 1996, 1998*, 2014)	7 (1986*, 1992*, 1995, 2002, 2003, 2004*, 2012)	7 (1981*, 1982, 1985, 1989, 1990, 1993, 2001)
Spain	1 (2004)	2 (2008, 2011)	3 (1997, 2005, 2006*)	2 (1999, 2000)
Great Britain^{~}		2 (1985, 2010)	2 (1978, 1984)	3 (1986, 1987, 2016*)
India		2 (2016, 2018)	1 (1982)	7 (1983, 1996*, 2002, 2003, 2004, 2012, 2014*)
South Korea		1 (1999)	2 (2000, 2009)	2 (1998, 2007)
Argentina			1 (2008)	1 (2018)
New Zealand				2 (1978, 2011*)
Soviet Union^{#}				1 (1988)

* = host nation
^ = includes results representing West Germany between 1980 and 1989
~ = includes results representing England
# = states that have since split into two or more independent nations

=== Team appearances ===
Team	(Pakistan) 1978	(Pakistan) 1980	(Pakistan) 1981	(Netherlands) 1982	(Pakistan) 1983	(Pakistan) 1984	(Australia) 1985	(Pakistan) 1986	(Netherlands) 1987	(Pakistan) 1988	(West Germany) 1989	(Australia) 1990	(Germany) 1991	(Pakistan) 1992	(Malaysia) 1993	(Pakistan) 1994	(Germany) 1995	(India) 1996	(Australia) 1997	(Pakistan) 1998	(Australia) 1999	(Netherlands) 2000	(Netherlands) 2001	(Germany) 2002	(Netherlands) 2003	(Pakistan) 2004	(India) 2005	(Spain) 2006	(Malaysia) 2007	(Netherlands) 2008	(Australia) 2009	(Germany) 2010	(New Zealand) 2011	(Australia) 2012	(India) 2014	(United Kingdom) 2016	(Netherlands) 2018	Total
Argentina	-	-	-	-	-	-	-	-	5th	-	-	-	-	-	-	-	-	-	-	-	-	-	-	-	5th	-	-	6th	-	3rd	-	-	-	-	6th	-	4th	6
Australia	2nd	3rd	2nd	2nd	1st	1st	1st	2nd	3rd	3rd	1st	1st	4th	2nd	1st	4th	2nd	6th	2nd	3rd	1st	5th	2nd	5th	2nd	-	1st	4th	2nd	1st	1st	1st	1st	1st	3rd	1st	1st	36
Belgium	-	-	-	-	-	-	-	-	-	-	-	-	-	-	-	-	-	-	-	-	-	-	-	-	-	-	-	-	-	-	-	-	-	5th	8th	5th	5th	4
France	-	-	-	-	-	-	-	-	-	-	-	-	-	6th	-	-	-	-	-	-	-	-	-	-	-	-	-	-	-	-	-	-	-	-	-	-	-	1
Germany^	-	2nd	3rd	5th	3rd	-	3rd	1st	1st	1st	3rd	3rd	1st	1st	2nd	2nd	1st	3rd	1st	6th	-	2nd	1st	2nd	6th	5th	4th	2nd	1st	5th	2nd	4th	5th	6th	1st	3rd	-	33
Great Britain~	3rd	7th	6th	-	-	3rd	2nd	4th	4th	6th	5th	6th	5th	5th	-	6th	6th	-	-	-	5th	6th	5th	-	-	-	-	-	6th	-	6th	2nd	6th	8th	7th	4th	-	24
India	-	5th	-	3rd	4th	-	6th	5th	-	-	6th	-	-	-	-	-	5th	4th	-	-	-	-	-	4th	4th	4th	6th	-	-	-	-	-	-	4th	4th	2nd	2nd	16
Malaysia	-	-	-	-	-	-	-	-	-	-	-	-	-	-	6th	-	-	-	-	-	-	-	-	-	-	-	-	-	8th	-	-	-	-	-	-	-	-	2
Netherlands	-	4th	1st	1st	5th	4th	5th	6th	2nd	-	2nd	2nd	3rd	4th	3rd	3rd	4th	1st	4th	1st	3rd	1st	3rd	1st	1st	2nd	2nd	1st	3rd	4th	4th	3rd	3rd	2nd	5th	-	3rd	34
New Zealand	4th	-	-	-	6th	5th	-	-	-	-	-	-	-	-	-	-	-	-	-	-	-	-	-	-	-	6th	-	-	-	-	-	6th	4th	7th	-	-	-	7
Pakistan	1st	1st	4th	4th	2nd	2nd	4th	3rd	7th	2nd	4th	4th	2nd	3rd	4th	1st	3rd	2nd	5th	2nd	6th	-	4th	3rd	3rd	3rd	5th	5th	7th	-	-	-	7th	3rd	2nd	-	6th	32
South Korea	-	-	-	-	-	-	-	-	-	-	-	-	-	-	-	-	-	-	6th	4th	2nd	3rd	6th	6th	-	-	-	-	4th	6th	3rd	-	8th	-	-	6th	-	11
Soviet Union#	-	-	-	6th	-	-	-	-	8th	4th	-	5th	6th	Defunct																								5
Spain	5th	6th	5th	-	-	6th	-	-	6th	5th	-	-	-	-	5th	5th	-	5th	3rd	5th	4th	4th	-	-	-	1st	3rd	3rd	5th	2nd	5th	5th	2nd	-	-	-	-	21
Total	5	7	6	6	6	6	6	6	8	6	6	6	6	6	6	6	6	6	6	6	6	6	6	6	6	6	6	6	8	6	6	6	8	8	8	6	6	234

^ = includes results representing West Germany between 1980 and 1989
~ = includes results representing England
# = states that have since split into two or more independent nations

Australia is the only team to have competed at almost every Champions Trophy, except for only one edition; 14 teams have competed in at least one Champions Trophy.

== Women ==
=== Summaries ===
Year	Hosts	Final			Third Place Match		
Year	Hosts	Winners	Score	Runners-up	Third Place	Score	Fourth Place
1987; Details	Amstelveen, Netherlands	Netherlands	RR	Australia	South Korea	RR	Canada
1989; Details	Frankfurt, West Germany	South Korea	RR	Australia	West Germany	RR	Great Britain
1991; Details	Berlin, Germany	Australia	RR	Germany	Netherlands	RR	Spain
1993; Details	Amstelveen, Netherlands	Australia	1–1 (4–2); Penalty strokes	Netherlands	Germany	2–0	South Korea
1995; Details	Mar del Plata, Argentina	Australia	1–1 (4–3); Penalty strokes	South Korea	United States	0–0 (4–1); Penalty strokes	Germany
1997; Details	Berlin, Germany	Australia	2–1; After extra time	Germany	Netherlands	5–2	South Korea
1999; Details	Brisbane, Australia	Australia	3–2	Netherlands	Germany	1–0	Argentina
2000; Details	Amstelveen, Netherlands	Netherlands	3–2	Germany	Australia	1–0	Argentina
2001; Details	Amstelveen, Netherlands	Argentina	3–2	Netherlands	Australia	2–1; After extra time	China
2002; Details	Macau	China	2–2 (3–1); Penalty strokes	Argentina	Netherlands	4–3; After extra time	Australia
2003; Details	Sydney, Australia	Australia	3–2	China	Netherlands	3–2	Argentina
2004; Details	Rosario, Argentina	Netherlands	2–0	Germany	Argentina	3–2	Australia
2005; Details	Canberra, Australia	Netherlands	0–0 (5–4); Penalty strokes	Australia	China	2–2 (9–8); Penalty strokes	Argentina
2006; Details	Amstelveen, Netherlands	Germany	3–2	China	Netherlands	1–1 (4–1); Penalty strokes	Argentina
2007; Details	Quilmes, Argentina	Netherlands	1–0	Argentina	Germany	2–0	Australia
2008; Details	Mönchengladbach, Germany	Argentina	6–2	Germany	Netherlands	3–0	China
2009; Details	Sydney, Australia	Argentina	0–0 (4–3); Penalty strokes	Australia	Netherlands	5–2	Germany
2010; Details	Nottingham, England	Argentina	4–2	Netherlands	England	2–1	Germany
2011; Details	Amsterdam, Netherlands	Netherlands	3–3 (3–2); Penalty strokes	Argentina	New Zealand	3–2	South Korea
2012; Details	Rosario, Argentina	Argentina	1–0	Great Britain	Netherlands	5–4	Germany
2014; Details	Mendoza, Argentina	Argentina	1–1 (3–1); Penalty strokes	Australia	Netherlands	2–1	New Zealand
2016; Details	London, United Kingdom	Argentina	2–1	Netherlands	United States	2–2 (1–0); Penalty strokes	Australia
2018; Details	Changzhou, China	Netherlands	5–1	Australia	Argentina	6–0	China

=== Performance by nation ===
Team	Titles	Runners-up	Third place	Fourth place
Netherlands	7 (1987*, 2000*, 2004, 2005, 2007, 2011*, 2018)	5 (1993*, 1999, 2001*, 2010, 2016)	9 (1991, 1997, 2002, 2003, 2006*, 2008, 2009, 2012, 2014)	
Argentina	7 (2001, 2008, 2009, 2010, 2012*, 2014*, 2016)	3 (2002, 2007*, 2011)	2 (2004*, 2018)	5 (1999, 2000, 2003, 2005, 2006)
Australia	6 (1991, 1993, 1995, 1997, 1999*, 2003*)	6 (1987, 1989, 2005*, 2009*, 2014, 2018)	2 (2000, 2001)	4 (2002, 2004, 2007, 2016)
Germany^	1 (2006)	5 (1991*, 1997*, 2000, 2004, 2008*)	4 (1989*, 1993, 1999, 2007)	4 (1995, 2009, 2010, 2012)
China	1 (2002*)	2 (2003, 2006)	1 (2005)	3 (2001, 2008, 2018*)
South Korea	1 (1989)	1 (1995)	1 (1987)	3 (1993, 1997, 2011)
Great Britain~		1 (2012)	1 (2010)	1 (1989)
United States			2 (1995, 2016)	
New Zealand			1 (2011)	1 (2014)
Canada				1 (1987)
Spain				1 (1991)

* = host nation
^ = includes results representing West Germany between 1987 and 1989
~ = includes results representing England

=== Team appearances ===
Team	(Netherlands) 1987	(West Germany) 1989	(Germany) 1991	(Netherlands) 1993	(Argentina) 1995	(Germany) 1997	(Australia) 1999	(Netherlands) 2000	(Netherlands) 2001	(Macau) 2002	(Australia) 2003	(Argentina) 2004	(Australia) 2005	(Netherlands) 2006	(Argentina) 2007	(Germany) 2008	(Australia) 2009	(England) 2010	(Netherlands) 2011	(Argentina) 2012	(Argentina) 2014	(United Kingdom) 2016	(China) 2018	Total
Argentina	-	-	-	-	6th	-	4th	4th	1st	2nd	4th	3rd	4th	4th	2nd	1st	1st	1st	2nd	1st	1st	1st	3rd	18
Australia	2nd	2nd	1st	1st	1st	1st	1st	3rd	3rd	4th	1st	4th	2nd	5th	4th	5th	2nd	-	6th	-	2nd	4th	2nd	21
Canada	4th	6th	-	-	-	-	-	-	-	-	-	-	-	-	-	-	-	-	-	-	-	-	-	2
China	-	-	5th	-	-	-	-	-	4th	1st	2nd	5th	3rd	2nd	-	4th	5th	6th	7th	8th	6th	-	4th	14
Germany^	-	3rd	2nd	3rd	4th	2nd	3rd	2nd	-	-	-	2nd	5th	1st	3rd	2nd	4th	4th	8th	4th	7th	-	-	17
Great Britain~	5th	4th	-	6th	-	5th	-	-	-	6th	5th	-	-	-	-	-	6th	3rd	5th	2nd	5th	5th	5th	13
Japan	-	-	-	-	-	-	-	-	-	-	-	-	-	-	5th	6th	-	-	-	5th	8th	-	6th	5
Netherlands	1st	5th	3rd	2nd	-	3rd	2nd	1st	2nd	3rd	3rd	1st	1st	3rd	1st	3rd	3rd	2nd	1st	3rd	3rd	2nd	1st	22
New Zealand	6th	-	-	-	-	-	5th	6th	5th	5th	-	6th	-	6th	-	-	-	5th	3rd	6th	4th	6th	-	12
South Africa	-	-	-	-	-	-	-	5th	-	-	-	-	-	-	-	-	-	-	-	-	-	-	-	1
South Korea	3rd	1st	6th	4th	2nd	4th	6th	-	-	-	6th	-	6th	-	-	-	-	-	4th	7th	-	-	-	11
Spain	-	-	4th	5th	5th	-	-	-	6th	-	-	-	-	-	6th	-	-	-	-	-	-	-	-	5
United States	-	-	-	-	3rd	6th	-	-	-	-	-	-	-	-	-	-	-	-	-	-	-	3rd	-	3
Total	6	6	6	6	6	6	6	6	6	6	6	6	6	6	6	6	6	6	8	8	8	6	6	144

^ = includes result representing West Germany in 1989
~ = includes results representing England

The Netherlands is the only team to have competed at almost every Champions Trophy, except for only one edition; 13 teams have competed in at least one Champions Trophy.

== See also ==
- Men's Hockey Champions Challenge I
- Women's Hockey Champions Challenge I
- Men's FIH Hockey World Cup
- Women's FIH Hockey World Cup
