= Ross Rutledge =

Canadian field hockey player (1962–2004)

Medal record

Men's field hockey

Representing Canada

Pan American Games
Gold medal – first place	1983 Caracas	Team
Gold medal – first place	1987 Indianapolis	Team
Silver medal – second place	1991 Havana	Team

Michael Ross "Roscoe" Rutledge (July 7, 1962 in Vancouver, British Columbia – April 23, 2004 in Langley, British Columbia) was a Canadian field hockey player.

Rutledge participated in two consecutive Summer Olympics for Canada, starting in 1984. After having finished in tenth position in Los Angeles, the longtime resident of Langley, British Columbia ended up in eleventh place with the Men's National Team in the Seoul Games.

He died from cancer. In Ambleside, West Vancouver, there is a field hockey turf called Rutledge Field, the home ground of the West Vancouver Field Hockey Club. The field was dedicated in memorial of Ross Rutledge in 2011 who was a local advocate for field hockey, having started the West Vancouver Field Hockey Club Adanacs player development program.

== International senior competitions ==
- 1984 – Olympic Games, Los Angeles (10th)
- 1988 – Olympic Games, Seoul (11th)
- 1990 – World Cup, Lahore (11th)
