= Taco van den Honert =

Dutch field hockey player (born 1966)

Medal record

Men's field hockey

Representing the Netherlands

Olympic Games
Gold medal – first place	1996 Atlanta	Team competition
Bronze medal – third place	1988 Seoul	Team competition

World Cup
Gold medal – first place	1990 Lahore	Team competition

Taco Hajo van den Honert (born 14 February 1966 in Leiden) is a former field hockey player from the Netherlands, who represented his native country in three consecutive Summer Olympics (1988, 1992 and 1996).

At his last appearance in Atlanta, Georgia, the skilled striker won the golden medal with the Dutch national team. A drag flick specialist playing for Amsterdam for most of his career, he retired from international field hockey after that event. He earned a total number of 215 caps, scoring 118 goals.
