= Xavier Escudé =

Spanish field hockey player (born 1966)

Personal information
- Full name: Xavier Escudé Torrente
- Born: 17 May 1966 (age 60) Terrassa, Catalonia, Spain

Sport
- Sport: Field hockey
Medal record
Men's field hockey
Representing Spain
Olympic Games
Silver medal – second place	1996 Atlanta	Team competition

Xavier Escudé Torrente (born 17 May 1966 in Terrassa, Catalonia) is a former field hockey player from Spain, who won the silver medal with the men's national team at the 1996 Summer Olympics in Atlanta, Georgia. He also participated in the 1988 Summer Olympics in Seoul, and the 1992 Summer Olympics in Barcelona.
