= Jude Felix Sebastian =

Indian field hockey player

Personal information
- Nationality: Indian
- Born: 26 January 1965 (age 61) Bangalore, India
- Education: St. Germain High School

Sport
- Sport: Field hockey
Medal record
Representing India
Men's field hockey
Asian Games
Silver medal – second place	1990 Beijing	Team
Silver medal – second place	1994 Hiroshima	Team

Jude Felix Sebastian (born 26 January 1965) is an Indian field hockey player. He competed at the 1988 Summer Olympics and the 1992 Summer Olympics. He has capped over 250 matches, including 2 World Cups, 2 Asian Games, and 3 Champions Trophy tournaments.

Jude Felix captained the National Hockey Team from 1993 to 1995, leading the side in the 1994 World Cup at Sydney and the Asian Games at Hiroshima. Named one of the 7 most contemporary players in the world by the International Hockey Federation (FIH) in 1995, he is known for his skillful reverse flick.

He has excelled both as a player and a coach, having received the Arjuna Award and Dronacharya Award, among the highest accolades in the field of sport in India. Under his mentorship, the Indian side has won several medals over the years, including Gold for the Senior Men’s Team at the 2014 Asian Games, and Silver for the Junior Team at the 2018 Sultan of Johor Cup.

He is a familiar figure in international hockey circles as well, having coached various clubs from 1997 to 2011, including the Indian Gymkhana club London,Racing Club de France – Paris, Singapore Recreation, Scottish Hockey Association, and the Netherlands Hockey Federation.

Jude Felix has also championed social initiatives in the sport, as the Founder, Trustee and President of Jude Felix Hockey Academy (JFHA). The academy has been transforming the lives of young members of the community through the sport of hockey since 2009.
