= Marcelo Mascheroni =

Argentine field hockey player

Marcelo Mascheroni (born 19 August 1959) is an Argentine former field hockey player who competed in the 1988 Summer Olympics.
