= Thoiba Singh Kshetrimayum =

Indian field hockey player

Thoiba Singh
Personal information
- Full name: Thoiba Singh Kshetrimayum
- Born: 1 December 1955 (age 70) Imphal, Manipur, India
- Height: 5 ft 6 in (164 cm)
- Weight: 139 lb (63 kg)

Sport
- Country: India
- Sport: Field hockey
Medal record
Representing India
Men's field hockey
Asian Games
Bronze medal – third place	1986 Seoul	Team
Silver medal – second place	1990 Beijing	Team

Thoiba Singh Kshetrimayum (Meitei: Kshetrimayum Thoiba Singh, born 1 December 1955) is an Indian field hockey player, who represented India at the Olympics and Asian Games. He played as a left-winger and was known for his speed and stamina. Today he coaches the Imphal Rangers, hockey team.

== Early life ==
Born on 1 February 1961, in Imphal, Manipur, India, to Ksh. Giridhon Singh and Ksh(o) Maikoibi Devi, Thoiba Singh took to hockey early on in life, and soon found his natural talent in the game.

== Professional career ==
He was a member of the 1988 Summer Olympics field hockey team in which India came in the 6th place. Other than Olympics, he represented India at Asia Cup 1985, 1989; Champions Trophy 1985, 1989; Azlan Shah Trophy 1985; 1986 Asian Games, 1990; World Cup 1986; Indo-Pak Test Series 1986; Five-nation 1988 and Indira Gandhi tournament 1987. Presently working as Dy. General Manager, Food Corporation of India, Regional Office, Imphal, Manipur

== See also ==
- India at the 1988 Summer Olympics
