= Ignacio Escudé =

Spanish field hockey player (born 1964)

Personal information
- Full name: Ignacio Escudé Torrente
- Born: 9 January 1964 (age 62)

Ignacio Escudé Torrente (Note: In this Spanish name, the first or paternal surname is Escudé and the second or maternal family name is Torrente.) (born 9 January 1964) is a Spanish former field hockey player who competed in the 1984 Summer Olympics, 1988 Summer Olympics and 1992 Summer Olympics.
