= Qazi Mohib =

Pakistani field hockey player

Personal information
- Nationality: Pakistani
- Born: 15 August 1963 Bannu, Pakistan
- Died: 29 December 1996 (aged 33) Peshawar, Pakistan (Laid to rest at Sokarri Graveyard, Bannu, Pakistan)

Sport
- Sport: Field hockey

Qazi Mohib (15 August 1963 – 29 December 1996) was a Pakistani field hockey player.

Considered "very stylish for a full-back, possessed fine stick-work and dribbling ability, Qazi Mohib, played 123 matches and scored 41 goals for his country. He became the third player from Bannu, in Khyber Pakhtunkhwa, to captain Pakistan hockey team, after the two brothers Abdul Hamid, Abdul Rashid Junior.

Qazi Mohib led Pakistan to gold medals in the 1989 Asia Cup as well as the 1990 Asian Games, and a silver medal in the 1990 World Cup, among other distinctions. He also represented the national team at the men's tournament at the 1988 Summer Olympics.

Qazi Mohib died on 29 December 1996. The main hockey stadium in his native Bannu is named after Qazi Mohib.
