= Zahid Sharif =

Pakistani field hockey player

Personal information
- Nationality: Pakistani
- Born: 11 November 1967 (age 58) Lahore, Pakistan

Sport
- Sport: Field hockey

Zahid Sharif (born 11 November 1967) is a Pakistani field hockey player.

He competed in the men's tournament at the 1988 Summer Olympics.
