= Mark Hager =

Australian field hockey player

Personal information
- Born: 28 April 1964 (age 62)

Sport
- Sport: Field hockey
National team
| Years | Team | Caps | Goals |
| 1985–1996 | Australia | 231 | (179) |
Medal record
Olympic Games
| Bronze medal – third place | 1996 Atlanta | Team |

Mark William Hager (born 28 April 1964) is a retired Australian field hockey player, who competed in two Summer Olympics for his native country. After the fourth place in 1988 he won the bronze medal with The Kookaburras at the 1996 Summer Olympics in Atlanta, Georgia where he was the captain.

== Coaching career ==
Following his playing career, Hager has been pursuing a coaching career in the sport. His achievements as a coach include:

- 2020 Tokyo Olympics - Head Coach, Great Britain Women (Bronze)
- 2018 Commonwealth Games - Head Coach, New Zealand Women (Gold)
- 2008 Beijing Olympics – Asst Coach, Australian Men (Bronze)
- 2009 8 Nations – Head Coach, Australian U21 Men (Gold)
- 2007 Youth Olympics – Head Coach, Australia (Gold)
- 2005–07 Australian Institute Team – Head Coach
- 2005 U21 World Cup – Head Coach, Australia (Silver)
- 2004 Athens Olympics – Asst Coach, Australian Women (5th)
- 2003 Champions Trophy – Asst Coach, Australian Women (Gold)
- 2002 World Cup – Asst Coach, Australian Women (4th)
- 2002 Champions Trophy – Asst Coach, Australian Women (4th)
- 2001 Champions Trophy – Asst Coach, Australian Women (Bronze)
- 2001 U21 World Cup – Head Coach, Australian Women (Bronze)
- 1998-0 AHL – Head Coach, WA Thundersticks (2 x Golds)

In December 2008, Hager was appointed the coach of the New Zealand women's national field hockey team (the Black Sticks Women). Besides this he is also the head coach of Kalinga Lancers which plays in the Hockey India League(HIL)

On 11 January 2019 Hager was appointed Head Coach of England & Great Britain women's national field hockey team

== Personal life ==
His wife Michelle Capes, sister-in-law Lee Capes, brother-in-law Michael Nobbs and niece Kaitlin Nobbs have all represented Australia at field hockey at the Olympic Games.
