= Floris Jan Bovelander =

Dutch field hockey player (born 1966)

Medal record

Men's field hockey

Representing the Netherlands

Olympic Games
Gold medal – first place	1996 Atlanta	Team competition
Bronze medal – third place	1988 Seoul	Team competition

World Cup
Gold medal – first place	1990 Lahore	Team competition
Silver medal – second place	1994 Sydney	Team competition

Floris Jan Bovelander (born 19 January 1966) is a former field hockey player from the Netherlands, who was a member of the Dutch national squad that won the gold medal at the 1996 Summer Olympics in Atlanta. Six years earlier, at the Hockey World Cup in Lahore, where he scored nine times, he won the world title with the Dutch side against the host nation Pakistan.

== Professional athlete ==
Bovelander was born in Haarlem, and made his debut for the Netherlands national team on Wednesday, 2 October 1985, in a friendly match against New Zealand resulting in a 3–1 win, and went on to play 241 international games, scored 215 goals, and participated in three Olympics.

He was famous for his devastating penalty corners, and was nicknamed Flop, Floppie and Boem Boem Bovelander. He played his last game for the Netherlands in the 1996 Olympic Hockey Final in Atlanta. Thanks in particular to two penalty corners from 'the cannon with the angel's face', the Netherlands won the Olympic title at the expense of Spain, 3–1. Earlier, he won all the bronze medals at the Olympics in 1988 in Seoul and was fourth at the 1992 Olympics in Barcelona.

During the Men's FIH Hockey World Cup in Lahore, Pakistan, in 1990, Bovelander played a pivotal role in winning the world title with nine goals, a significant improvement on his first World Cup in 1986 in London, where the Dutch hockey team finished seventh. The third World Cup in which Bovelander participated was the hockey world championship (1994) in Sydney. The team lost the final after penalties from Pakistan.

In 1987, Bovelander won gold with the Dutch hockey team at the EuroHockey Nations Championship in Moscow. Four years later, he picked up a silver at the European Championship in Paris. His seventeen goals during that tournament are still the highest number scored by a single player during a European Championship tournament.

Bovelander, nicknamed Flop, Floppie or Boem Boem, spent his entire career (fifteen seasons) with HC Bloemendaal, the club with which he won the Dutch league title six times, one indoor title and one EuroHockey Club Champions Cup in 1987. With a tally of 276 goals, he was, for many years, the top scorer in the Dutch Hockey League until he was overtaken on 6 November 2011 by Roderick Weusthof and later by Taeke Taekema.

== Post-sports career ==
After his hockey career, Bovelander completed his biology studies, but remained active in hockey. Among other things, Bovelander was a member of the top sport committee of HC Bloemendaal for five years, and more than a year under the national coach Joost Bellaart (2001–2004) for the national team as manager and assistant trainer. Bovelander studied medical biology in Leiden, but nowadays mainly earns a living as an organiser of hockey camps and clinics, youth and corporate events. The company that he runs together with his brother Jeroen is called Bovelander & Bovelander. He also wrote a weekly column in the free daily newspaper De Pers. Bovelander is also active as an ambassador for Right To Play.

He started Bovelander Hockey Academy in Netherlands, which is notably also the technical partner of Odisha Naval Tata Hockey High Performance Centre situated in Kalinga Stadium, Bhubaneswar, India.
