= Warren Birmingham =

Australian field hockey player

Olympic medal record

Men's field hockey

Representing Australia
Silver medal – second place	1992 Barcelona	Team competition

Warren Allen Birmingham (born 22 August 1962) is a former field hockey player from Australia. He competed at both the 1988 Summer Olympics and the 1992 Summer Olympics, winning the silver medal with the Australian team, which he captained, in 1992.
