= Field hockey at the 1984 Summer Olympics – Men's team squads =

List of hockey players

Twelve national teams competed in the Olympic Hockey Tournament at the 1984 Summer Olympics in Los Angeles. Sixteen players were officially enrolled in each squad.

== Group A ==
=== Australia ===
- Manager: Richard Aggiss
1. Ric Charlesworth (c)
2. Jim Irvine
3. Colin Batch
4. David Bell
5. Adrian Berce
6. Grant Boyce
7. Craig Davies
8. Peter Haselhurst
9. Treva King
10. Terry Leece
11. Grant Mitton
12. Michael Nobbs
13. Nigel Patmore
14. Trevor Smith
15. Neil Snowden
16. Terry Walsh (GK)

=== India ===
- Manager: Nandy Singh Graha
1. Romeo James (GK)
2. Manohar Topno
3. Vineet Kumar Sharma
4. Somaya Maneypanda
5. Joaquim Carvalho
6. Rajinder Singh
7. Charanjit Kumar
8. Mervyn Fernandis
9. Hardeep Singh
10. Mohammed Shahid
11. Zafar Iqbal (c)
12. Pangambam Nilakomol Singh (GK)
13. Iqbaljit Singh Grewal
14. Ravinder Pal Singh
15. Marcellus Gomes
16. Jalal-ud-Din Syed Rizvi

=== Malaysia ===
- Manager: M Noordin Hassan
1. Ahmed Fadzil (GK)
2. Yahya Atan
3. Foo Keat Seong
4. Sukhvinderjeet Singh Kulwant
5. Michael Chew
6. Sarjit Singh Kyndan
7. Stephen Van Huizen
8. Jagjit Singh Chet
9. Soon Mustafa bin Karim
10. Kevin Nunis
11. Ow Soon Kooi
12. Tam Chew Seng
13. Shurentheran Murugesan
14. Poon Fook Loke (c)
15. Colin Santa Maria
16. Zulkifli Abbas

=== Spain ===
- Manager: Luis Antonio Twose
1. José Agut (GK)
2. Javier Cabot
3. Juan Arbós
4. Andrés Gómez
5. Juan Carlos Peón
6. Jaime Arbós (c)
7. Ricardo Cabot
8. Juan Malgosa
9. Carlos Roca
10. Mariano Bordas
11. Ignacio Cobos
12. Jordi Oliva
13. Miguel de Paz
14. Ignacio Escudé
15. Santiago Malgosa
16. Jose Miguel García (GK)

=== United States ===
- Manager: Dewey Lee Yoder
1. Mohammed Barakat
2. Ken Barrett
3. Rawle Cox
4. Trevor Fernandes
5. Robert Gregg
6. Iqbal Manzar (c)
7. Michael Kraus
8. Randy Lipscher (GK)
9. David McMichael
10. Gary Newton
11. Michael Newton
12. Brian Spencer
13. Morgan Stebbins
14. Robert Stiles (GK)
15. Andrew Stone
16. Nigel Traverso

=== West Germany ===
- Manager: Hugo Budinger
1. Christian Bassemir (GK)
2. Tobias Frank (GK)
3. Horst-Ulrich Hänel
4. Carsten Fischer
5. Karl-Joachim Hürter
6. Ekkhard Schmidt-Opper (c)
7. Reinhard Krull
8. Michael Peter (c)
9. Stefan Blöcher
10. Andreas Keller
11. Thomas Reck
12. Markku Slawyk
13. Thomas Gunst
14. Heiner Dopp
15. Volker Fried
16. Dirk Brinkmann

== Group B ==
=== Canada ===
- Manager: Shiaz Virjee
- Head coach: Shiv Jagday
1. Julian Austin
2. Ken Goodwin (GK)
3. Pat Caruso
4. David Bissett (c)
5. Patrick Burrows
6. Rob Smith
7. Neki Sandhu
8. Ernest Cholakis
9. Kip Hladky
10. Paul Chohan
12. Ross Rutledge
13. Reg Plummer
14. Harbhajan Rai
15. Bruce MacPherson
16. Trevor Porritt
17. Aaron Fernandes

=== Great Britain ===
- Manager: Roger Self
- Head coach: David Whitaker
1. Ian Taylor (GK)
2. Veryan Pappin (GK)
3. Stephen Martin
4. Paul Barber
5. Robert Cattrall
6. Jonathan Potter
7. Richard Dodds
8. Billy McConnell
9. Norman Hughes
10. David Westcott
11. Richard Leman
12. Stephen Batchelor
13. Sean Kerly
14. James Duthie
15. Kulbir Bhaura
16. Mark Precious

=== Kenya ===
- Manager: Pritam Sandhu
1. Emmanuel Oduol (GK)
2. Julius Akumu
3. Lucas Alubaha
4. Michael Omondi
5. Parminder Singh Saini
6. Manjeet Singh Panesar
7. Jitender Singh Panesar
8. Peter Akatsa
9. Harvinder Singh Kular
10. Christopher Otambo
11. Barjinder Daved (c)
12. Raphael Fernandes
13. Sunil Chhabra
14. Sarabjit Singh Sehmi
15. Eric Otieno
16. Julius Mutinda

=== Netherlands ===
- Manager: Johan Bolhuis
1. Pierre Hermans (GK)
2. Arno den Hartog
3. Cees Jan Diepeveen
4. Eric Pierik
5. Theo Doyer
6. Tom van 't Hek
7. Peter van Asbeck
8. Ewout van Asbeck
9. Hans Kruize
10. Ties Kruize (c)
11. Ron Steens
12. Hidde Kruize
13. Lex Bos
14. Roderik Bouwman
15. René Klaassen
16. Maarten van Grimbergen

=== New Zealand ===
- Manager: David Coulter
- Head coach: B Maunsell
1. Jeff Archibald
2. Husmukh Bhikha
3. Christopher Brown
4. George Carnoutsos
5. Peter Daji
6. Laurie Gallen
7. Stuart Grimshaw
8. Trevor Laurence
9. Grant McLeod
10. Brent Miskimmin
11. Peter Miskimmin
12. Arthur Parkin (c)
13. Ramesh Patel
14. Robin Wilson
15. Maurice Marquet (GK)
16. Graham Sligo (GK)

=== Pakistan ===
- Manager: Manzoor Atif
- Head coach: Khwaja Zakauddin
1. Syed Ghulam Moinuddin (GK)
2. Qasim Zia
3. Nasir Ali
4. Abdul Rashid Al-Hasan
5. Ayaz Mahmood
6. Naeem Akhtar
7. Kaleemullah Khan
8. Manzoor Hussain (c)
9. Hassan Sardar
10. Hanif Khan
11. Khalid Hamid
12. Shahid Ali Khan (GK)
13. Tauqeer Dar
14. Ishtiaq Ahmed
15. Saleem Sherwani
16. Mushtaq Ahmad
