= Kenya at the 1984 Summer Olympics =

- IOC code: KEN
- NOC: National Olympic Committee of Kenya
- Website: teamkenya.or.ke

in Los Angeles
- Competitors: 61
- Flag bearer: James Omondi
- Medals Ranked 23rd: Gold 1 Silver 0 Bronze 2 Total 3

Summer Olympics appearances (overview)
- 1956; 1960; 1964; 1968; 1972; 1976–1980; 1984; 1988; 1992; 1996; 2000; 2004; 2008; 2012; 2016; 2020; 2024

Kenya was represented at the 1984 Summer Olympics in Los Angeles, California, United States by the National Olympic Committee of Kenya.

In total, 61 athletes including 56 men and five women represented Kenya in five different sports including athletics, boxing, field hockey, shooting and weightlifting.

Kenya won a total of three medals at the games after Julius Korir claimed gold in the men's 3000 m steeplechase, Mike Musyoki won bronze in the men's 10,000 m and Ibrahim Bilali claimed bronze in the boxing flyweight category.

== Background ==
The National Olympic Committee of Kenya was founded in 1955 and Kenya made their Olympic debut at the 1956 Summer Olympics in Melbourne, Victoria, Australia. They participated in the following four games before taking part in the African boycott of the 1976 Summer Olympics in Montreal, Quebec, Canada. They also took part in the United States-led boycott of the 1980 Summer Olympics in Moscow, Russian Soviet Federative Socialist Republic, Soviet Union. The 1984 Summer Olympics in Los Angeles, California, United States marked their sixth appearance at the Olympics.

== Competitors ==
In total, 61 athletes represented Kenya at the 1984 Summer Olympics in Los Angeles, California, United States across five different sports.

Sport	Men	Women	Total
Athletics	27	5	32
Boxing	10	—	10
Field hockey	16	0	16
Shooting	2	0	2
Weightlifting	1	—	1
Total	56	5	61

== Medalists ==
Kenya won a total three medals at the games after Julius Korir claimed gold in the men's 3,000 m steeplechase, Mike Musyoki won bronze in the men's 10,000 m and Ibrahim Bilali claimed bronze in the boxing flyweight category.

Medal	Name	Sport	Event	Date
Gold	Julius Korir	Athletics	Men's 3,000 m steeplechase	10 August
Bronze	Mike Musyoki	Athletics	Men's 10,000 m	6 August
Bronze	Ibrahim Bilali	Boxing	Flyweight	9 August

== Athletics ==
In total, 32 Kenyan athletes participated in the athletics events – Alfred Nyambane in the men's 200 m, John Anzrah and David Kitur in the men's 400 m and the men's 4 x 400 m relay, James Atuti in the men's 400 m, Edwin Koech, Billy Konchellah and Juma Ndiwa in the men's 800 m, Kipkoech Cheruiyot, Joseph Chesire and Josephat Muraya in the men's 1,500 m, Charles Cheruiyot, Paul Kipkoech and Wilson Waigwa in the men's 5,000 m, Sostenes Bitok and Michael Musyoki in the men's 10,000 m, Joseph Nzau in the men's 10,000 m and the men's marathon, Kimurgor Ngeny and Joseph Otieno in the men's marathon, Simon Kitur in the men's 400 m hurdles and the men's 4 x 400 m relay, Meshak Munyoro in the men's 400 m hurdles, Julius Kariuki, Julius Korir and Kip Rono in the men's 3,000 m steeplechase, Elijah Sogomo and Jason Opicho in the men's 4 x 400 m relay, Pius Munyasia in the men's 20 km race walk, Moses Kiyai in the men's long jump and the men's triple jump, Ruth Waithera in the women's 200 m and the women's 400 m, Selina Chirchir in the women's 800 m, Justina Chepchirchir in the women's 1,500 m, Hellen Kimaiyo in the women's 3,000 m and Mary Wagaki in the women's marathon.

== Boxing ==
In total, 10 Kenyan athletes participated in the boxing events – Ibrahim Bilali in the Flyweight category, Daniel Mwangi in the light flyweight category, Sammy Mwangi in the bantamweight category, Augustus Oga in the middleweight category, Sylvanus Okello in the light heavyweight category, Stephen Okumu in the light middleweight category, James Omondi in the heavyweight category,Charles Owiso in the light welterweight category, John Wanjau in the featherweight category and Patrick Waweru in the lightweight category.

== Field hockey ==
In total, 16 Kenyan athletes participated in the field hockey events – Peter Akatsa, Julius Akumu, Lucas Alubaha, Sunil Chhabra, Brajinder Daved, Raphael Fernandes, Harvinder Kular, Julius Mutinda, Emmanual Oduol, Michael Omondi, Chris Otambo, Eric Otieno, Jitender Panesar, Manjeet Panesar, Parminder Saini and Sarabjit Sehmi in the men's tournament.

== Shooting ==
In total, two Kenyan athletes participated in the shooting events – Shuaib Adam in the men's 50 metre pistol and Robert Carr-Hartley in the trap.

== Weightliftinging ==
In total, one Kenyan athlete participated in the weightlifting events – Pius Ochieng in the –100 kg category.
