= 1982 Men's Hockey World Cup =

1982 Hockey World Cup
- Official logo

Tournament details
- Host country: India
- City: Bombay
- Dates: 29 December 1981 – 12 January 1982
- Teams: 12 (from 4 confederations)
- Venue: BHA Stadium

Final positions
- Champions: Pakistan (3rd title)
- Runner-up: West Germany
- Third place: Australia

Tournament statistics
- Matches played: 42
- Goals scored: 203 (4.83 per match)
- Top scorer: (India) Rajinder Singh (12 goals)

The 1982 Men's Hockey World Cup was the fifth edition of the Hockey World Cup, the quadrennial world championship for men's national field hockey teams organized by the FIH. The event took place from 29 December 1981 to 12 January 1982 in Mumbai (Bombay), India.

12 teams competed in the tournament that Pakistan won for the third time by defeating West Germany 3–1 in the final. Pakistan remained unbeaten throughout the tournament, while the only defeat for the other finalist, West Germany, came at the hands of Pakistan in their pool match.

== Pools ==
Pools for the 1982 Men's Hockey World Cup as announced by the International Hockey Federation (FIH) were:

Pool A	Pool B
Pakistan; West Germany; Poland; New Zealand; Spain; Argentina	Australia; Netherlands; India; England; Soviet Union; Malaysia

== Results ==
All times are Indian Standard Time (UTC+05:30).

=== Preliminary round ===
==== Pool A ====
Pos	Team	Pld	W	D	L	GF	GA	GD	Pts	Qualification
1	Pakistan	5	5	0	0	31	9	+22	10	Advance to the semi-finals
2	West Germany	5	3	1	1	13	10	+3	7	Advance to the semi-finals
3	Poland	5	2	0	3	7	11	−4	4	5th–8th place classification
4	New Zealand	5	2	0	3	10	19	−9	4	5th–8th place classification
5	Spain	5	1	1	3	6	10	−4	3	9th–12th place classification
6	Argentina	5	1	0	4	9	17	−8	2	9th–12th place classification

Source: FIH

30 December 1981
16:30

New Zealand	2–0	Spain
Daji; Parkin	Report

30 December 1981
16:30

Pakistan	6–1	Argentina
Hassan 14'; Kaleemullah 35'; Manzoor 37'; Saeed 48'; Abdul 66'; Saleem 70'	Report	Mascheroni 25'

30 December 1981
18:00

West Germany	5–3	Poland
Blöcher; Dopp; Schmidt-Opper; Wistuba	Report	Horwat; Michalak; Rachwalski

1 January 1982
16:30

New Zealand	1–2	West Germany
Bhana	Report	Blöcher; Peter

1 January 1982
16:30

Pakistan	4–1	Spain
Kaleemullah 13', 55'; Manzoor 14'; Hassan 62'	Report	Roca 68'

2 January 1982
16:30

Pakistan	12–3	New Zealand
Samiullah 11'; Manzoor 12', 28', 69'; Hanif 13', 33', 35'; Kaleemullah 26'; Hassan 41', 50', 60', 64'	Report	Daji; Parkin

Umpires:
Louis-Michel Gillet (FRA)
Alain Renaud (FRA)

2 January 1982
18:00

Argentina	1–2	Poland
Garraffo	Report	Lachowicz; Michalak

3 January 1982
18:00

Spain	0–1	Poland
	Report	Kruś

3 January 1982
18:00

Argentina	0–2	West Germany
	Report	Montag; Schmidt-Opper

5 January 1982
16:30

New Zealand	3–5	Argentina
Miskimmin; Parkin; R. Patel	Report	Garraffo; González; Mascheroni; Pazos

5 January 1982
18:00

West Germany	3–5	Pakistan
Peter 41', 47', 61'	Report	Kaleemullah 32'; Samiullah 34', 70'; Manzoor 43'; Hassan 60'

6 January 1982
16:30

Poland	0–1	New Zealand
	Report	Parkin

6 January 1982
16:30

Spain	4–2	Argentina
Coghen; Roca	Report	González; Pazos

7 January 1982
16:30

Poland	1–4	Pakistan
Kruś	Report	Samiullah 17'; Kaleemullah 41'; Hassan 43'; Saeed 57'

7 January 1982
16:30

West Germany	1–1	Spain
Peter	Report	Coghen

==== Pool B ====
Pos	Team	Pld	W	D	L	GF	GA	GD	Pts	Qualification
1	Australia	5	5	0	0	13	5	+8	10	Advance to the semi-finals
2	Netherlands	5	3	1	1	17	11	+6	7	Advance to the semi-finals
3	India (H)	5	3	0	2	21	12	+9	6	5th–8th place classification
4	Soviet Union	5	0	3	2	9	15	−6	3	5th–8th place classification
5	England	5	1	1	3	6	13	−7	3	9th–12th place classification
6	Malaysia	5	0	1	4	5	15	−10	1	9th–12th place classification

Source: FIH
(H) Hosts

29 December 1981
17:00

India	6–2	Malaysia
Fernandis 12', ?'; Rajinder 37', 43', 63'; Surinder ?'	Report	Seong 20'; Murugesan 30'

30 December 1981
18:00

Netherlands	6–2	England
Litjens 5'; Bouwman 10', 11'; Leefers 14'; Van 't Hek 49', 69'	Report	Bhaura 23', 45'

31 December 1981
18:00

Australia	3–2	Soviet Union
Haselhurst; Walsh	Report	Lampeyev; Nichepurenko

1 January 1982
18:00

Netherlands	4–3	India
Bouwman 25', 28'; Van 't Hek 37'; Van Grimbergen 54'	Report	Rajinder 1'; Maharaj 22'; Surinder 51'

1 January 1982
18:00

Malaysia	0–3	Australia
	Report	Irvine; Walsh

2 January 1982
16:30

England	1–1	Soviet Union
Barber 70'	Report	Pleshakov 62'

2 January 1982
18:00

Netherlands	3–1	Malaysia
Bouwman; Van 't Hek; Litjens	Report	Seong

3 January 1982
16:30

India	7–2	Soviet Union
Rajinder; Surinder; Surjit; Syed; Zafar	Report	Mishurnov

3 January 1982
16:30

Australia	2–0	England
Charlesworth; Davies	Report

5 January 1982
16:30

Australia	3–2	Netherlands
Davies 33', 60'; Haselhurst 46'	Report	Litjens 36'; Kruize 40'

5 January 1982
18:00

Malaysia	0–1	England
	Report	Barber 67'

6 January 1982
18:00

Soviet Union	2–2	Malaysia
Mishurnov; Lampeyev	Report	Seng; Seong

6 January 1982
18:00

England	2–4	India
Westcott 19'; Barber 53'	Report	Surinder 28'; Rajinder 29', 33'; Gurmail 70'

7 January 1982
18:00

India	1–2	Australia
Ravinder Pal 37'	Report	Davies 46'; Haselhurst 63'

7 January 1982
18:00

Soviet Union	2–2	Netherlands
Klevtsov; Zagorodnev	Report	Bouwman; Litjens

=== Ninth to twelfth place classification ===
Crossover
9 January
Spain	2
Malaysia	4
9 January
England	1
Argentina	0

Ninth place
11 January
Malaysia	2
England	3
Eleventh Place
10 January
Spain	3
Argentina	0

==== Cross-overs ====
9 January 1982

England	1–0	Argentina
Francis	Report

9 January 1982

Spain	2–4	Malaysia
Bordas	Report	Kooi; Santa Maria; Seng; Seong

==== Eleventh and twelfth place ====
10 January 1982
16:00

Spain	3–0	Argentina
Roca 8'; Malgosa 22'; Bordas 23'	Report

==== Ninth and tenth place ====
11 January 1982
18:30

Malaysia	2–3	England
Seng 16'; Loke 24'	Report	Bhaura 42'; Barber 66'; Francis 69'

=== Fifth to eighth place classification ===
Crossover
9 January
Poland	0
Soviet Union	1
9 January
India	3
New Zealand	2

Fifth place
11 January
Soviet Union	1
India	5
Seventh place
10 January
Poland	1
New Zealand	6

==== Cross-overs ====
9 January 1982

Poland	0–1	Soviet Union
	Report	Klevtsov

9 January 1982

India	3–2	New Zealand
Rajinder	Report	G. McLeod; R. Patel

==== Seventh and eighth place ====
10 January 1982
18:30

Poland	1–6	New Zealand
Rachwalski 53'	Report	R. Patel 6', 29'; G. McLeod 21'; Carnoutsos 30', 31'; Miskimmin 68'

==== Fifth and sixth place ====
11 January 1982
16:00

Soviet Union	1–5	India
Goncharov 28'	Report	Shahid 4'; Rajinder 16'; Surjit 42', 52'; Zafar 69'

=== First to fourth place classification ===
Semi-finals
10 January
Pakistan	4
Netherlands	2
10 January
Australia	3 (5)
West Germany (pen.)	3 (8)

Final
12 January
Pakistan	3
West Germany	1
Third place
12 January
Netherlands	2
Australia	4

==== Semi-finals ====
10 January 1982
16:00

Pakistan	4–2	Netherlands
Hanif 23'; Kaleemullah 29'; Hassan 32'; Manzoor 59'	Report	Litjens 27', 46'

10 January 1982
18:30

Australia	3–3	West Germany
Walsh 44', 57'; Charlesworth 72'	Report	Dopp 27', 62'; Montag 83'
Penalties
	5–8

==== Third and fourth place ====
12 January 1982
16:30

Netherlands	2–4	Australia
Litjens 7'; Bouwman 23'	Report	Davies 9', 43', 48'; Batch 15'

==== Final ====
12 January 1982
18:30

Pakistan	3–1	West Germany
Hassan ?'; Manzoor ?'; Kaleemullah 60'	Report	Dopp 5'

Attendance: 35,000
Umpires:
Alain Renaud (FRA)
Horacio Servetto (ARG)

== Final standings ==
Pos	Team	Pld	W	D	L	GF	GA	GD	Pts	Final result
1st place, gold medalist(s)	Pakistan	7	7	0	0	38	12	+26	14	Gold medal
2nd place, silver medalist(s)	West Germany	7	3	2	2	17	16	+1	8	Silver medal
3rd place, bronze medalist(s)	Australia	7	6	1	0	20	10	+10	13	Bronze medal
4	Netherlands	7	3	1	3	21	19	+2	7	
5	India (H)	7	5	0	2	29	15	+14	10	
6	Soviet Union	7	1	3	3	11	20	−9	5	
7	New Zealand	7	3	0	4	18	23	−5	6	
8	Poland	7	2	0	5	8	18	−10	4	
9	England	7	3	1	3	10	15	−5	7	
10	Malaysia	7	1	1	5	11	20	−9	3	
11	Spain	7	2	1	4	11	14	−3	5	
12	Argentina	7	1	0	6	9	21	−12	2	

Source: FIH
(H) Hosts

== Goalscorers ==
There were 203 goals scored in 42 matches, for an average of 4.83 goals per match.

12 goals

- (India) Rajinder Singh

10 goals

- (Pakistan) Hassan Sardar

8 goals

- (Pakistan) Manzoor Hussain
- (Pakistan) Kaleemullah Khan

7 goals

- (Australia) Craig Davies
- (Netherlands) Roderik Bouwman
- (Netherlands) Paul Litjens

6 goals

- (Australia) Terence Walsh

5 goals

- (India) Surinder Singh Sodhi
- (New Zealand) Arthur Parkin
- (Spain) Carlos Roca
- (West Germany) Heiner Dopp
- (West Germany) Michael Peter

4 goals

- (England) Paul Barber
- (Malaysia) Foo Keat Seong
- (Netherlands) Thomas van 't Hek
- (New Zealand) Ramesh Patel
- (Pakistan) Hanif Khan
- (Pakistan) Samiullah Khan

3 goals

- (Argentina) Marcelo Pazos
- (Australia) Peter Haselhurst
- (England) Kulbir Bhaura
- (India) Surjit Singh Randhawa
- (Malaysia) Tam Chew Seng
- (Soviet Union) Viacheslav Mishurnov
- (Spain) Mariano Bordas

2 goals

- (Argentina) Marcelo Garraffo
- (Argentina) Fernando González
- (Argentina) Marcelo Mascheroni
- (Australia) Richard Charlesworth
- (England) Neil Francis
- (India) Mervyn Fernandis
- (India) Zafar Iqbal
- (New Zealand) George Carnoutsos
- (New Zealand) Peter Daji
- (New Zealand) Grant McLeod
- (New Zealand) Peter Miskimmin
- (Pakistan) Saeed Khan
- (Poland) Marek Kruś
- (Poland) Krzysztof Michalak
- (Poland) Zbigniew Rachwalski
- (Soviet Union) Sergei Klevtsov
- (Soviet Union) Vyacheslav Lampeyev
- (Spain) Juan Coghen
- (West Germany) Stefan Blöcher
- (West Germany) Hans Montag
- (West Germany) Ekkhard Schmidt-Opper

1 goal

- (Australia) Colin Batch
- (Australia) James Irvine
- (England) David Westcott
- (India) Syed Ali
- (India) Maharaj Krishan Kaushik
- (India) Mohammed Shahid
- (India) Gurmail Singh
- (India) Ravinder Pal Singh
- (Malaysia) Ow Soon Kooi
- (Malaysia) Poon Fook Loke
- (Malaysia) Shurentheran Murugesan
- (Malaysia) Brian Santa Maria
- (Netherlands) Maarten van Grimbergen
- (Netherlands) Ties Kruize
- (Netherlands) Wouter Leefers
- (New Zealand) Balvant Bhana
- (Pakistan) Abdul Rashid
- (Pakistan) Saleem Sherwani
- (Poland) Henryk Horwat
- (Poland) Zbigniew Lachowicz
- (Soviet Union) Alexander Goncharov
- (Soviet Union) Mikhail Nichepurenko
- (Soviet Union) Sergei Pleshakov
- (Soviet Union) Oleg Zagorodnev
- (Spain) Santiago Malgosa
- (West Germany) Andreas Wistuba

Source: FIH
