= India at the 1984 Summer Olympics =

- IOC code: IND
- NOC: Indian Olympic Association

in Los Angeles
- Competitors: 48 in 7 sports
- Flag bearer: Zafar Iqbal
- Medals: Gold 0 Silver 0 Bronze 0 Total 0

Summer Olympics appearances (overview)
- 1900; 1904–1912; 1920; 1924; 1928; 1932; 1936; 1948; 1952; 1956; 1960; 1964; 1968; 1972; 1976; 1980; 1984; 1988; 1992; 1996; 2000; 2004; 2008; 2012; 2016; 2020; 2024

India was represented at the 1984 Summer Olympics in Los Angeles, California, United States by the Indian Olympic Association.

In total, 48 athletes including 42 men and six women represented India in seven different sports including athletics, boxing, hockey, sailing, shooting, weightlifting and wrestling.

India did not win any medals but the Games are remembered for putting Indian women athletes on centre stage. P. T. Usha missed out on the bronze medal in 400 m hurdles by 0.01 seconds. Shiny Abraham became the first Indian woman to reach the semi-finals of an Olympic event after setting a personal best of two minutes 4.69 seconds in the women's 800 m. The Indian women's 4 x 400 m relay team also made it to the finals where they finished seventh.

== Background ==
Although the Indian Olympic Association wasn't founded until 1927, British India made its Olympic debut at the 1920 Summer Olympics in Antwerp, Belgium. Norman Pritchard, a British resident of Calcutta, is also considered to have represented British India at the 1900 Summer Olympics in Paris, France. India competed as an independent nation for the first time at the 1948 Summer Olympics in London, England, United Kingdom. They have not missed an Olympics since 1920. The 1984 Summer Olympics in Los Angeles, California, United States marked their 15th appearance at the Olympics.

== Competitors ==
In total, 48 athletes represented India at the 1984 Summer Olympics in Los Angeles, California, United States across seven different sports.

Sport	Men	Women	Total
Athletics	3	5	8
Boxing	2	—	2
Field hockey	16	0	16
Sailing	2	0	2
Shooting	7	1	8
Weightlifting	4	—	4
Wrestling	8	—	8
Total	42	6	48

== Athletics ==
In total, eight Indian athletes participated in the athletics events – Shiny Abraham in the women's 800 m and the women's 4 × 400 m relay, Charles Borromeo in the men's 800 m, Chand Ram in the men's 20 km race walk, Vandana Rao in the women's 4 × 400 m relay, Gurtej Singh in the men's javelin throw, P. T. Usha and M. D. Valsamma in the women's 400 m hurdle and the women's 4 × 400 m relay and Geeta Zutshi in the women's 3,000 m.

Athlete	Events	Round 1		Quarterfinal		Semifinal		Final	
Athlete	Events	Time	Position	Time	Position	Time	Position	Time	Position
Charles Borromeo	800 m	1:51:52	5	Did not advance					
Chand Ram	Men's 20 km walk	—N/a						1:30:06	22
Gurtej Singh	Men's javelin throw	—N/a						70.08	25

Athlete	Event	Heat		Semifinal		Final	
Athlete	Event	Result	Rank	Result	Rank	Result	Rank
Shiny Abraham	800 m	2:04.69	4	2:05.42	16	Did not advance	
Geeta Zutshi	3,000 m	9:40.28	8	Did not advance			
P. T. Usha	400 meters hurdle	56.81	2	55.94	1	55.42	4
M. D. Valsamma	400 meters hurdle	1:00:03	5	Did not advance			
M. D. Valsamma, Vandana Rao, Shiny Abraham, P. T. Usha	4 × 400 m relay			3:33.85	4	3:32:49	7

== Boxing ==
In total, two Indian athletes participated in the boxing events – Jaslal Pradhan in the light welterweight category and Kaur Singh in the heavyweight category.

== Field hockey ==
In total, 16 Indian athletes participated in the field hockey events – Joaquim Carvalho, Mervyn Fernandis, Zafar Iqbal, Marcellus Gomes, Iqbaljit Singh Grewal, Romeo James, Charanjit Kumar, Somaya Maneypanda, Jalal-ud-Din Syed Rizvi, Mohammed Shahid, Vineet Kumar Sharma, Hardeep Singh, Pangambam Nilakomol Singh, Rajinder Singh, Ravinder Pal Singh and Manohar Topno in the men's tournament.

== Sailing ==
In total, two Indian athletes participated in the sailing events – Dhruv Bhandari and Farokh Tarapore in the 470.

== Shooting ==
In total, eight Indian athletes participated in the shooting events – Soma Dutta in the women's 10 m air rifle and the women's 50 m rifle three positions, Baljit Singh Kharab in the men's 50 m pistol, Mohinder Lal and Rajinder Kumar Vij in the men's 25 m rapid fire pistol, Bhagirath Samai in the men's 10 m air rifle and the men's 50 m rifle prone, Mansher Singh and Randhir Singh in the trap and Harisimran Singh Sandhu in the skeet.

== Weightlifting ==
In total, four Indian athletes participated in the weightlifting events – Deven Govindasami in the –56 kg category, Mahendran Kannan and Manikyalu Malla Venkata in the –52 kg category and Kamalakanta Santra in the –60 kg category.

== Wrestling ==
In total, eight Indian athletes participated in the wrestling events – Rohtas Singh Dahiya in the freestyle –57 kg category, Sunil Dutt in the freestyle –48 kg category, Jai Prakash in the freestyle –90 kg category, Gian Singh in the freestyle –62 kg category, Jagmander Singh in the freestyle –68 kg category, Kartar Singh in the freestyle –100 kg category, Mahabir Singh in the freestyle –52 kg category and Rajinder Singh in the freestyle –74 kg category.
