= 1986 Men's Hockey World Cup =

1986 Hockey World Cup
- Logo of the World Cup

Tournament details
- Host country: England
- City: London
- Dates: 4–19 October 1986
- Teams: 12
- Venue: Willesden Sports Centre

Final positions
- Champions: Australia (1st title)
- Runner-up: England
- Third place: West Germany

Tournament statistics
- Matches played: 42
- Goals scored: 146 (3.48 per match)
- Top scorer: (Australia) Richard Charlesworth (7 goals)
- Best player: (India) Mohammed Shahid

The 1986 Hockey World Cup was the sixth Hockey World Cup men's field hockey tournament. It was held in London, England. The competition was won by Australia, who defeated host nation England 2–1 in the final. West Germany finished third after defeating the Soviet Union.

England, as hosts – and also as Olympic bronze medallists – were viewed as having quite a tough group, containing World and Olympic champions Pakistan, and a highly fancied Dutch side, with the Soviet Union seen as potential dark-horse outsiders. But Pakistan struggled badly, winning only a single group match against New Zealand, failing to adjust to the AstroTurf surface, used in a major hockey tournament for the first time instead of grass. The Soviets scored surprise victories over both Pakistan and England, leaving England in danger of going out of their own tournament in the group stages: however they recovered to win their final group match, against the Dutch. This left England, the USSR and the Netherlands all level on points with four wins and one loss each. England and the Soviet Union were equal on goal difference as well as points, England being ahead on goals scored: the Dutch unfortunate to be in third due to an inferior goal difference to both.

In the other group, things were expected to be more straightforward, with West Germany and Australia (Olympic silver medallists and fourth place respectively) being the two favourites. Australia duly topped the group by defeating everybody except the Germans, with whom they drew: the Germans also finished the group undefeated to qualify comfortably in second place, though they also drew with Spain and India. The latter, hockey giants of the past, were nowhere near the same force in the present: in the play-offs for the minor places, India ended up losing both matches, including the 11th–12th place play-off to the otherwise hapless Pakistan.

The first semi-final, between England and West Germany, was an absolute classic. A replay of the semi-final of the 1984 Olympic tournament, won 1–0 by the Germans, meant that the English had a score to settle. England dominated most of the first half, but in the end had only one goal to show for it, scored by star centre-forward Sean Kerly. In the second half, the Germans found their form, equalising from a penalty corner, and then going into the lead with a smart strike from their captain, Heiner Dopp. The remainder of the match was end-to-end stuff as England pressed hard for an equaliser. Several times they came close from both open play and penalty corners: shots whizzed past the post, crosses were desperately intercepted, the keeper himself made a few useful saves – but the Germans were themselves dangerous on the breakaway. Fischer thought he had scored a German third from a penalty corner, but it was disallowed as the ball flew dangerously high off his stick: Dopp, too, nearly scored another, but was denied by a last-ditch deflection from England's own captain, Richard Dodds. Finally, in the last minute, with England on the verge of going out, they were awarded a penalty corner, from which Paul Barber scored an equalizer – almost blocked by a German stick, but it deflected into the roof of the net, forcing extra time. The extra period was as thrilling as the last minutes of the main game, both sides going for all-out attack: the game was finally settled by another English penalty corner, from which Barber scored an action-replay of his earlier goal to send England into the final.

The second semi-final, after all that, was an anti-climax, Australia hammering the Soviet Union by 5–0. The Soviets made a slightly better fist of the third-place play-off against the Germans, but in the end it was the Germans who clinched third place.

The final was also a rematch of sorts – England having defeated Australia in the Olympic third-place play-off, the Aussies were out for revenge. England started slowly, and Terry Walsh scored an early goal to put Australia into a deserved lead. England soon began to find their feet, with some typically mazy dribbles by Imran Sherwani threatening the Australian lines: but another goal soon followed for the Australians, this time against the run of play, from a penalty corner. This goal was in fact briefly disputed by England, who claimed that the shot had flown too high, above the back board of the net: but the referee ruled that it had brushed the goalkeeper's glove on the way, so the "too high" was counted as a deflection off an English player rather than a straight hit from the Australian scorer, and England were 2–0 behind at half-time. The second half was a more scrappy affair – England by and large having the greater amount of possession, but unable to create any significant chances against a well-drilled Australian defensive line. Late on in the game, a defensive error finally allowed Jon Potter in to score, but it was too little, too late: Australia hung on for a 2–1 victory.

== Results ==
=== Preliminary round ===
==== Pool A ====
Pos	Team	Pld	W	D	L	GF	GA	GD	Pts	Qualification
1	England	5	4	0	1	9	4	+5	8	Advanced to Semi-finals
2	Soviet Union	5	4	0	1	6	1	+5	8	Advanced to Semi-finals
3	Netherlands	5	4	0	1	5	2	+3	8	
4	Argentina	5	1	1	3	5	7	−2	3	
5	Pakistan	5	1	0	4	8	13	−5	2	
6	New Zealand	5	0	1	4	5	11	−6	1	

Source: FIH
Rules for classification: 1) points; 2) goal difference; 3) goals scored; 4) head-to-head result.

4 October 1986
11:00

Pakistan	1–3	Argentina
Iqbal (1 Goal)	Report	Mascheroni (1 Goal); Garraffo (1 Goal); Verga (1 Goal)

4 October 1986
13:30

England	3–1	New Zealand
Kerly (2 Goals); Batchelor (1 Goal)	Report	Daji (1 Goal)

4 October 1986
16:00

Netherlands	1–0	Soviet Union
Heijn (1 Goal)	Report

6 October 1986
11:00

Soviet Union	1–0	New Zealand
Deputatov (1 Goal)	Report

6 October 1986
13:30

England	2–1	Argentina
Barber (1 Goal); Sherwani (1 Goal)	Report	Mascheroni (1 Goal)

6 October 1986
16:00

Pakistan	1–2	Netherlands
Mohib (1 Goal)	Report	Van Grimbergen (1 Goal); Schlattman (1 Goal)

8 October 1986
11:00

New Zealand	3–5	Pakistan
Daji (2 Goals); Wilson (1 Goal)	Report	Zia (3 Goals); Ali (1 Goal); Sardar (1 Goal)

8 October 1986
13:30

Soviet Union	1–0	England
Goncharov (1 Goal)	Report

8 October 1986
16:00

Argentina	0–1	Netherlands
	Report	Van 't Hek (1 Goal)

11 October 1986
11:00

England	3–1	Pakistan
Potter (2 Goals); Kerly (1 Goal)	Report	Khan (1 Goal)

11 October 1986
13:30

Argentina	0–2	Soviet Union
	Report	Zigangirov (2 Goals)

11 October 1986
16:00

Netherlands	1–0	New Zealand
Kruize (1 Goal)	Report

13 October 1986
11:00

New Zealand	1–1	Argentina
Wilson (1 Goal)	Report	Siri (1 Goal)

13 October 1986
13:30

Pakistan	0–2	Soviet Union
	Report	Deputatov (1 Goal); Pleshakov (1 Goal)

13 October 1986
16:00

Netherlands	0–1	England
	Report	Sherwani (1 Goal)

==== Pool B ====
Pos	Team	Pld	W	D	L	GF	GA	GD	Pts	Qualification
1	Australia	5	4	1	0	24	6	+18	9	Advanced to Semi-finals
2	West Germany	5	2	3	0	9	4	+5	7	Advanced to Semi-finals
3	Poland	5	2	1	2	8	9	−1	5	
4	Spain	5	2	1	2	7	13	−6	5	
5	India	5	1	1	3	5	11	−6	3	
6	Canada	5	0	1	4	3	13	−10	1	

Source: FIH
Rules for classification: 1) points; 2) goal difference; 3) goals scored; 4) head-to-head result.

5 October 1986
11:00

Australia	6–2	Canada
Charlesworth 12', 16'; Hawgood (2 Goals); Bestall (1 Goal); Walsh (1 Goal)	Report	Grimmer (1 Goal); Sandhu (1 Goal)

5 October 1986
13:30

India	0–1	Poland
	Report	Myśliwiec (1 Goal)

5 October 1986
16:00

West Germany	0–0	Spain
	Report

7 October 1986
11:00

Spain	2–1	India
I. Escudé (1 Goal); X. Escudé (1 Goal)	Report	Somaya (1 Goal)

7 October 1986
13:30

West Germany	2–2	Australia
Fischer (1 Goal); Reck (1 Goal)	Report	Birmingham (1 Goal); Mitton (1 Goal)

7 October 1986
16:00

Canada	0–0	Poland
	Report

10 October 1986
11:00

India	2–0	Canada
Balwinder (1 Goal); Thoiba (1 Goal)	Report

10 October 1986
13:30

Spain	0–6	Australia
	Report	Batch (2 Goals); Charlesworth (2 Goals); Hager (1 Goal); Hawgood (1 Goal)

10 October 1986
16:00

Poland	0–3	West Germany
	Report	Fischer (1 Goal); Hilgers (1 Goal); Reck (1 Goal)

12 October 1986
11:00

Poland	5–2	Spain
Podzorski (4 Goals); Mirosław 44'	Report	X. Escudé 61'; Roca 41'

12 October 1986
13:30

Australia	6–0	India
Mitton 13', 52'; Birmingham 28'; Batch 31'; Walsh 56'; Davies 67'	Report

12 October 1986
16:00

West Germany	2–0	Canada
Fischer (1 Goal); Hilgers (1 Goal)	Report

14 October 1986
11:00

Canada	1–3	Spain
Rutledge 59'	Report	Malgosa 14'; X. Escudé 20', 48'

14 October 1986
11:00

India	2–2	West Germany
Carvalho 8'; Shahid ?'	Report	Dopp 21'; Fischer 44'

14 October 1986
16:00

Australia	4–2	Poland
Charlesworth (1 Goal); Davies (1 Goal); Haselhurst (1 Goal); Hawgood (1 Goal)	Report	Kubisiak (1 Goal); Myśliwiec (1 Goal)

=== Classification round ===
==== Ninth to twelfth place classification ====
Crossover
16 October 1986
Pakistan	1
Canada	2
16 October 1986
India	1
New Zealand	2

Ninth Place
17 October 1986
Canada	1
New Zealand	2
Eleventh Place
17 October 1986
Pakistan (a.e.t)	3
India	2

===== Crossover =====
16 October 1986
11:00

Pakistan	1–2	Canada
Ali (1 Goal)	Report	Rutledge (2 Goals)

16 October 1986
16:00

India	1–2	New Zealand
Shahid (1 Goal)	Report	Daji (1 Goal); McLeod (1 Goal)

===== Eleventh and twelfth place =====
17 October 1986
13:30

Pakistan	3–2 (a.e.t.)	India
Ali (1 Goal); Khan (1 Goal); Mohib (1 Goal)	Report	Mohinder Pal (2 Goals)

===== Ninth and tenth place =====
17 October 1986
11:00

Canada	1–2	New Zealand
Porritt (1 Goal)	Report	McLeod (1 Goal); Pierce (1 Goal)

==== Fifth to eighth place classification ====
Crossover
17 October 1986
Netherlands	1
Spain	4
16 October 1986
Poland	0
Argentina	1

Fifth Place
19 October 1986
Spain	3
Argentina	2
Seventh Place
18 October 1986
Netherlands	7
Poland	2

===== Crossover =====
16 October 1986
13:30

Poland	0–1	Argentina
	Report	Verga (1 Goal)

17 October 1986
16:00

Netherlands	1–4	Spain
Bovelander (1 Goal)	Report	J. Escudé (2 Goals); X. Escudé (1 Goal); Oliva (1 Goal)

===== Seventh and eighth place =====
18 October 1986
13:30

Netherlands	7–2	Poland
Schlatmann (2 Goals); Bovelander (1 Goal); Delissen (1 Goal); Diepeveen (1 Goal); Klaassen (1 Goal); H. Kruize (1 Goal)	Report	Klatt (1 Goal); Podzorksi (1 Goal)

===== Fifth and sixth place =====
19 October 1986
11:00

Spain	3–2	Argentina
J. Escudé (3 Goals)	Report	Geneyro (1 Goal); Siri (1 Goal)

==== First to fourth place classification ====
Semi-finals
18 October 1986
England (a.e.t)	3
West Germany	2
18 October 1986
Australia	5
Soviet Union	0

Final
19 October 1986
England	1
Australia	2
Third place
19 October 1986
West Germany (a.e.t)	3
Soviet Union	2

===== Semi-finals =====
18 October 1986
11:00

England	3–2 (a.e.t.)	West Germany
Kerly 34'; Barber 69', 78'	Report	Hürter 18'; Dopp 44'

18 October 1986
16:00

Australia	5–0	Soviet Union
Charlesworth 21', 57'; Mitton 29'; Bestall 43'; Haselhurst 65'	Report

===== Third and fourth place =====
19 October 1986
13:30

West Germany	3–2 (a.e.t.)	Soviet Union
Dopp 18'; Blocher 53'; Reck 74'	Report	Nichepurenko 3'; Deputatov 21'

===== Final =====
19 October 1986
16:00

England	1–2	Australia
Potter 42'	Report	Walsh 15'; Bestall 24'

Umpires:
Santiago Deo (ESP)
Alain Renaud (FRA)

Australia
Neil Snowden, John Bestall, Craig Davies, David Bell (capt), Warren Birmingham, Treva King, Grant Mitton (sub Dean Evans), Colin Batch, Terry Walsh, Ric Charlesworth, Neil Hawgood (sub Peter Haselhurst)

England
Ian Taylor, David Faulkner, Paul Barber, Jon Potter, Richard Dodds (capt), Martyn Grimley, Stephen Batchelor (sub Kulbir Bhaura), Richard Leman (sub John Shaw), Sean Kerly, Norman Hughes, Imran Sherwani

1986 Hockey World Cup winner

Australia
First title

== Statistics ==
=== Final standings ===
As per statistical convention in field hockey, matches decided in extra time are counted as wins and losses, while matches decided by penalty shoot-outs are counted as draws.

Pos	Grp	Team	Pld	W	D	L	GF	GA	GD	Pts	Final result
1st place, gold medalist(s)	B	Australia	7	6	1	0	31	7	+24	13	Gold Medal
2nd place, silver medalist(s)	A	England	7	5	0	2	13	8	+5	10	Silver Medal
3rd place, bronze medalist(s)	B	West Germany	7	3	3	1	14	9	+5	9	Bronze Medal
4	A	Soviet Union	7	4	0	3	8	9	−1	8	Fourth place
5	B	Spain	7	4	1	2	14	16	−2	9	Eliminated in group stage
6	A	Argentina	7	2	1	4	8	10	−2	5	Eliminated in group stage
7	A	Netherlands	7	5	0	2	13	8	+5	10	Eliminated in group stage
8	B	Poland	7	2	1	4	10	17	−7	5	Eliminated in group stage
9	A	New Zealand	7	2	1	4	9	13	−4	5	Eliminated in group stage
10	B	Canada	7	1	1	5	6	16	−10	3	Eliminated in group stage
11	A	Pakistan	7	2	0	5	12	17	−5	4	Eliminated in group stage
12	B	India	7	1	1	5	8	16	−8	3	Eliminated in group stage

Source: FIH

=== Goalscorers ===
There were 146 goals scored in 42 matches, for an average of 3.48 goals per match.

7 goals

- (Australia) Richard Charlesworth

5 goals

- (Poland) Karol Podzorski
- (Spain) Jaime Escudé

4 goals

- (Australia) Neil Hawgood
- (Australia) Grant Mitton
- (England) Sean Kerly
- (New Zealand) Peter Daji
- (Spain) Xavier Escudé
- (West Germany) Carsten Fischer

3 goals

- (Australia) Colin Batch
- (Australia) John Bestall
- (Australia) Terry Walsh
- (Canada) Ross Rutledge
- (England) Paul Barber
- (England) Jonathan Potter
- (Netherlands) Gert Jan Schlatmann
- (Pakistan) Nasir Ali
- (Pakistan) Qasim Zia
- (Soviet Union) Viktor Deputatov
- (West Germany) Heiner Dopp
- (West Germany) Thomas Reck

2 goals

- (Argentina) Marcelo Mascheroni
- (Argentina) Alejandro Siri
- (Argentina) Alejandro Verga
- (Australia) Warren Birmingham
- (Australia) Craig Davies
- (Australia) Peter Haselhurst
- (England) Imran Sherwani
- (India) Mohammed Shahid
- (India) Mohinder Pal Singh
- (Netherlands) Floris Jan Bovelander
- (New Zealand) Robin Wilson
- (New Zealand) Grant McLeod
- (Pakistan) Kaleemullah Khan
- (Pakistan) Qazi Mohib
- (Poland) Andrzej Myśliwiec
- (Soviet Union) Farit Zigangirov
- (Spain) Santiago Malgosa
- (West Germany) Michael Hilgers

1 goal

- (Argentina) Marcelo Garraffo
- (Argentina) Carlos Geneyro
- (Australia) Mark Hager
- (Canada) Wayne Grimmer
- (Canada) Trevor Porritt
- (Canada) Hargurnek Sandhu
- (England) Stephen Batchelor
- (India) Joaquim Carvalho
- (India) M. M. Somaya
- (India) Balwinder Singh
- (India) Thoiba Singh
- (Netherlands) Marc Delissen
- (Netherlands) Cees Jan Diepeveen
- (Netherlands) Maarten Van Grimbergen
- (Netherlands) Ronald Jan Heijn
- (Netherlands) René Klaassen
- (Netherlands) Hidde Kruize
- (Netherlands) Ties Kruize
- (Netherlands) Thomas van 't Hek
- (New Zealand) Gregory Pierce
- (Pakistan) Pervaiz Iqbal
- (Pakistan) Hassan Sardar
- (Poland) Wojciech Klatt
- (Poland) Marian Kubisiak
- (Poland) Jerzy Mirosław
- (Soviet Union) Aleksandr Goncharov
- (Soviet Union) Mikhail Nichepurenko
- (Soviet Union) Sergei Pleshakov
- (Spain) Ignacio Escudé
- (Spain) Jordi Oliva
- (Spain) Carlos Roca
- (West Germany) Stefan Blocher
- (West Germany) Karl-Joachim Hürter
