= Ken Barrett =

Ken Barrett may refer to:

- Ken Barrett (field hockey) (born 1963), American Olympic hockey player
- Ken Barrett (loyalist) (born c. 1963), Northern Irish former loyalist paramilitary
- Ken Barrett (English footballer) (1938–2015), English footballer
- Ken Barrett (Australian footballer) (born 1939), Australian rules footballer
