= Panesar =

Panesar is an Indian surname from Punjab. Notable people with the surname include:

- Balraj Panesar (born 1996), Canadian field hockey player
- Bhai Trilochan Singh Panesar (1937–2010), Indian social worker
- Jitender Singh Panesar (born 1958), Kenyan field hockey player
- Manjeet Singh Panesar (born 1962), Kenyan field hockey player
- Monty Panesar (born 1982), English international cricketer
- Sukhi Panesar (born 1993), Canadian field hockey Player
- Surjeet Singh Panesar (1938–2019), Kenyan field hockey player

Fictional characters with the surname include:

- Ash Panesar, an EastEnders character
- Jags Panesar, an EastEnders character
- Kheerat Panesar, an EastEnders character
- Suki Panesar, an EastEnders character
- Vinny Panesar, an EastEnders character

== See also ==
- Panesar-e Tashkan, a village in Iran
