= Mastiphal =

Mastiphal may refer to:

- Mastiphal (band), a prominent Polish black metal band
- Mastiphal (Dungeons & Dragons), a demon lord in Dungeons & Dragons
