= Harvinder Singh =

Harvinder Singh may refer to:

- Harvinder Singh (cricketer)
- Harvinder Singh (archer)
- Harvinder Singh Kular, Kenyan field hockey player
- Harvinder Singh Marwa, Kenyan field hockey player
- H. S. Phoolka (Harvinder Singh Phoolka), lawyer and politician
