= Transkarpatia =

Studio album by Darzamat
- Released: 2005
- Recorded: December 5, 2005; Los Angered Recordings, Sweden
- Genre: Symphonic black metal Gothic metal
- Length: 50:19
- Label: Metal Mind Productions
- Producer: Andy LaRocque

Darzamat chronology
Semidevilish (2004)	Transkarpatia (2005)	Live Profanity (Visiting the Graves of Heretics) (2007)

Professional ratings
Review scores
Source	Rating
Allmusic	link
Chronicles of Chaos	6/10 stars
Metal Storm	8/10 stars

Transkarpatia is the fifth album by the Polish symphonic black metal band Darzamat which was released in 2005 and was recorded at Los Angered Recordings in Sweden. The album was produced by Andy LaRocque (King Diamond).

== Track listing ==
1. "Sanguinarius" (Intro) – 1:23
2. "Vampiric Prose" – 3:26
3. "Hallucinations" – 3:57
4. "Inhumatus" (Intro) – 1:08
5. "The Burning Times" – 4:43
6. "Letter from Hell" – 3:30
7. "Blackward" – 4:02
8. "Recurring Yell" – 5:11
9. "Araneum" (Intro) – 0:50
10. "Labyrinth of Anxiety" – 3:56
11. "Virus" – 5:27
12. "The Old Form of Worship" – 2:52
13. "Tempted by Rot" – 4:36
14. "Tribute to..." – 5:18

=== Notes ===
1. The songs Sanguinarius, Inhumatus and Araneum are instrumental tracks and contain no lyrics nor vocals.
2. A video of the song The Burning Times was made and can be viewed online.

== Personnel ==
- Agnieszka "Nera" Górecka – vocals
- Rafał "Flauros" Góral – vocals
- Krzysztof "Chris" Michalak – electric guitar
- Patryk "Spectre" Kumór – keyboard instruments
- Maciej "Darkside" Kowalski – drums
- Krzysztof "Bacchus" Kłosek – bass guitar
