= Semidevilish =

Studio album by Darzamat
- Released: 2004
- Recorded: June – August 2004
- Genre: Symphonic black metal Gothic metal
- Length: 49:38
- Label: Metal Mind Productions
- Producer: Self-produced

Darzamat chronology
Oniriad (2003)	Semidevilish (2004)	Transkarpatia (2005)

Professional ratings
Review scores
Source	Rating
Lords of Metal	link

Semidevilish is the fourth album by the Polish symphonic black metal band Darzamat which was released in 2004. This album features new female singer Nera.

== Track listing ==
1. "Intro" - 2:50
2. "In Red Iris" - 4:33
3. "Era Aggression" - 4:01
4. "Time Of Obscure Emotions" - 5:02
5. "Fistful Of Ashes" - 5:06
6. "Demise" - 4:18
7. "Absence Of Light" - 4:25
8. "The Darkest One" - 3:41
9. "Dusk" - 6:01
10. "From Beyond" - 4:56
11. "In Its Cobweb" - 4:45

Total playtime: 49:38 minutes.

=== Notes ===
1. An enhanced audio disc was released under Metal Mind Productions containing a video of the song Era Aggression which could be viewed if one were to insert the disc into the computer. The video was recorded at the 9th edition of the Brutal Assault Festival, where Darzamat played in August that same year.

== Personnel ==
- Agnieszka "Nera" Górecka - vocals
- Rafał "Flauros" Góral - vocals
- Damian "Daamr" Kowalski - electric guitar, bass guitar
- Krzysztof "Chris" Michalak - electric guitar
- Patryk "Spectre" Kumór - keyboard instruments
- Tomasz "Golem" Dańczak - drums
