= Solfernus' Path =

Studio album by Darzamat
- Released: August 28, 2009
- Recorded: 2008–2009; Poland
- Genre: Symphonic black metal Gothic metal
- Label: Massacre Records
- Producer: Jonas Kjellgren

Darzamat chronology
Live Profanity (Visiting the Graves of Heretics) (2007)	Solfernus' Path (2009)

Professional ratings
Review scores
Source	Rating
Lords of Metal	8.9/10
The Metal Observer	7.5/10 stars

Solfernus' Path is the sixth album by the Polish symphonic black metal band Darzamat, released on August 28, 2009. It was recorded at several studios in Poland. The drums and guitars were recorded at HH Poland Studio in Gliwice, while the vocals were recorded at Maq Studio. The keyboard parts were recorded at Spectre (Darzamat's keyboard player)'s home studio. The album was produced by Jonas Kjellgren (Scar Symmetry) and featured a guest appearance by Andy LaRocque (of King Diamond) who played the guitar solo for the song King of Burning Anthems. La Rocque recorded his part in his own Sonic Train Studios in Varberg. They met when La Rocque produced their previous album Transkarpatia.

On the events of the Polish band's camp, the band's vocalist Nera comments:

This is the first concept album in Darzamat's history. The story contained in the album takes place in an indeed mystical decor which is created by the mansion of Countess Josephine von Kuchmeister. The inspiration for the very mansion was derived from situated in Gliwice Willa Caro as well as from the Palaces in Pławniowice and Świerklaniec. The action of "Solfernus' Path" takes place at the beginning of XXth century. We are coming back with the new album after the almost two-year break and therefore we are very excited about the fact new material will soon be brought to our fans. The concept album is a certain kind of novelty for us, however, we've been nursing the idea of doing it for a long time. This is a coherent story being told by the lyrics and the music.

— Nera, Darzamat

== Track listing CD ==
1. "False Sleepwalker"
2. "Vote for Heresy"
3. "I Devium"
4. "Pain Collector"
5. "Final Conjuration"
6. "II Fumus"
7. "Gloria Inferni"
8. "III Venenum"
9. "Solfernus' Path"
10. "Lunar Silhouette"
11. "King of Burning Anthems"
12. "IV Spectaculum"
13. "Chimera"
14. "A Mesmeric Séance"

== Track listing Vinyl ==
1. "False Sleepwalker"
2. "Vote for Heresy"
3. "Pain Collector"
4. "Final Conjuration"
5. "Gloria Inferni"
6. "Solfernus Path"
7. "Lunar Silhouette"
8. "King of Burning Anthems"
9. "Chimera"
10. "A Mesmeric Séance"

== Personnel ==
- Agnieszka "Nera" Górecka - vocals
- Rafał "Flauros" Góral - vocals
- Krzysztof "Chris" Michalak - electric guitar, bass guitar
- Patryk "Spectre" Kumór - keyboard instruments
- Mariusz "Rogol" Prętkiewicz - percussions
- Jonas Kljellgren - mixing

== Photo shoots ==
A photo shoot for the band, which was taken in Świerklaniec, in Silesia, was done. Another photo shoot, where a 1934 BMW also took part, was also done.

The Palace in Świerklaniec, in an excellent manner, mirrors the character and the climate of this story. It's the extraordinary place which enchanted us at first sight! There were a few sets that constituted our photo shoot and each of them has a different character and its unique charm. It's an amazing idea, which added the flavor to these pictures. The effect is truly superb. We felt as if we were taking part in a videoclip making. There was a pretty big technical crew engaged in this undertaking and the photo shoot lasted nearly....10 hours!!!! The worst part of it was that we had to be on place at 3.30 a.m... The photographer had the concept that he would manage to 'seize' the excellent sky before the sunrise. It appeared a bit nonsensical to us but when we saw the results, we understood what he had on mind...

— Nera, Darzamat
