= Escudé =

Escudé is a surname. Notable people with this surname include:

- Carlos Escudé (1948–2021), Argentine academic and writer
- Guillem Anglada-Escudé (born 1979), Spanish astrophysicist
- Ignacio Escudé (born 1964), Spanish field hockey player
- Jaime Escudé (born 1962), Spanish field hockey player
- Julien Escudé (born 1979), French footballer
- Laura Escudé, American composer and violinist
- Nicolas Escudé (born 1976), French tennis player
- Xavier Escudé (born 1966), Spanish field hockey player
