= Neil Francis =

Neil Francis may refer to:

- Neil Francis (broadcaster), DJ on Absolute Radio
- Neil Francis (rugby union), Leinster and Ireland rugby player
- Neil Francis (field hockey), England international field hockey player
