= Agut =

Agut is a surname. Notable people with the surname include:

- José Agut (born 1961), Spanish field hockey player
- Philippe Agut (1929–1988), French cyclist
- Roberto Bautista Agut (born 1988), Spanish tennis player

== See also ==
- Aguts, a commune in Tarn, Occitanie, France
