= Malgosa =

Malgosa is a surname. Notable people with the surname include:

- Joaquim Malgosa (born 1963), Spanish field hockey player
- Juan Malgosa (born 1959), Spanish field hockey player
- Santiago Malgosa (born 1956), Spanish field hockey player
