= Field hockey at the 1982 Asian Games =

- Venue: Shivaji Stadium
- Dates: 20 November – 1 December
- Nations: 10

Champions
- Men: Pakistan (6th title)
- Women: India (1st title)

Field hockey events were contested at the 1982 Asian Games in New Delhi, India.

== Medal summary ==
=== Medalists ===
Event	Gold	Silver	Bronze
Men	Pakistan; Ishtiaq Ahmed; Mushtaq Ahmad; Saeed Ahmed; Nasir Ali; Manzoor-ul-Hassan; Rashid-ul-Hassan; Manzoor Hussain; Hanif Khan; Kaleemullah Khan; Muhammad Saeed Khan; Samiullah Khan; Shahid Ali Khan; Muhammad Rashid; Hassan Sardar; Qamar Zia; Qasim Zia	India; Syed Ali; J. M. Carvalho; Rajinder Singh Jr. Merwyn Fernandes; Jagdeep Singh Gill; Marcellus Gomes; Zafar Iqbal; Romeo James; Charanjit Kumar; Mir Ranjan Negi; Mohammed Shahid; Vineet Kumar Sharma; Gurmail Singh; Rajinder Singh Sr. M. M. Somaya; Manohar Topno	Malaysia; Zulkifli Abbas; Abdul Rahim Ahmad; Fidelis Anthony; Jagjit Singh Chet; Michael Chew; Foo Keat Seong; Soon Mustapha; Kevin Nunis; Sarjit Singh; Colin Sta Maria; Surenthiran Murugasen; Tam Chiew Seng; Wallace Tan; Stephen Van Huizen; Mohamed Yazid; Ahmad Fadzil Zainal
Women	India; Fiona Albuquerque; Gangotri Bhandari; Sudha Chaudhary; Selma D'Silva; Anurita Dubey; Pritpal Kaur; Rajbir Kaur; Sharanjit Kaur; Davinder Khokhar; S. Omana Kumari; Nazleen Madraswalla; Eliza Nelson; Varsha Soni; Prem Maya Sonir; Margaret Toscano; Razia Zaidi	South Korea; Cho Ki-hyang; Choi Eun-ok; Chung Sang-hyun; Han Ok-kyung; Hwang Keum-sook; Jin Won-sim; Kim Mi-sun; Kim Seong-sook; Lee Ji-hye; Lee Woe-nam; Lim Hyang-sil; Lim Kye-sook; Na Myung-wol; Seo Kwang-mi; Shin Kyung-hee; Yoo Hyun-sook	Malaysia; Norizan Abdul Majid; Asma Amin; Daphne Boudville; Christina Chin; Goh Joo Paik; Elizabeth Gomez; Mary Lim; Lum Sau Foong; Maheswari Kanniah; Rawiyah Rawi; Noorlaila Senawi; Mary Soo; Teh Siew Bee; Halimaton Yaacob; Yew Seok Ann; Yuen Lai Heng

=== Medal table ===
* Host nation (India)

Rank	Nation	Gold	Silver	Bronze	Total
1	India (IND)*	1	1	0	2
2	Pakistan (PAK)	1	0	0	1
3	South Korea (KOR)	0	1	0	1
4	Malaysia (MAS)	0	0	2	2
Totals (4 entries)		2	2	2	6

== Results ==
=== Men's tournament ===
==== Preliminary round ====
===== Group A =====
Team	Pld	W	D	L	GF	GA	GD	Pts
India	4	4	0	0	37	1	+36	8
Malaysia	4	3	0	1	20	7	+13	6
Oman	4	1	0	3	6	20	−14	2
Hong Kong	4	1	0	3	6	22	−16	2
Bangladesh	4	1	0	3	4	23	−19	2

20 November

India	10–0	Hong Kong

Shivaji Stadium, New Delhi

20 November

Bangladesh	1–2	Oman

Shivaji Stadium, New Delhi

21 November

Malaysia	7–0	Bangladesh

Shivaji Stadium, New Delhi

22 November

Hong Kong	4–2	Oman

Shivaji Stadium, New Delhi

22 November

India	5–1	Malaysia

Shivaji Stadium, New Delhi

23 November

India	12–0	Bangladesh

Shivaji Stadium, New Delhi

24 November

Malaysia	7–0	Hong Kong

Shivaji Stadium, New Delhi

25 November

India	10–0	Oman

Shivaji Stadium, New Delhi

25 November

Hong Kong	2–3	Bangladesh

Shivaji Stadium, New Delhi

26 November

Malaysia	5–2	Oman

Shivaji Stadium, New Delhi

===== Group B =====
Team	Pld	W	D	L	GF	GA	GD	Pts
Pakistan	3	3	0	0	28	1	+27	6
Japan	3	2	0	1	11	14	−3	4
South Korea	3	1	0	2	5	18	−13	2
China	3	0	0	3	2	13	−11	0

20 November

Japan	6–2	South Korea

Shivaji Stadium, New Delhi

21 November

Pakistan	6–0	China

Shivaji Stadium, New Delhi

22 November

Pakistan	10–0	South Korea

Shivaji Stadium, New Delhi

23 November

Japan	4–0	China

Shivaji Stadium, New Delhi

24 November

Pakistan	12–1	Japan

Shivaji Stadium, New Delhi

26 November

South Korea	3–2	China

Shivaji Stadium, New Delhi

==== Classification 5th–8th ====
Semifinals
Hong Kong	1
South Korea	5
Oman	4
China	5

5th place match
South Korea	3
China	1

Hong Kong	1–5	South Korea

Shivaji Stadium, New Delhi

Oman	4–5	China

Shivaji Stadium, New Delhi

===== 5th place match =====
South Korea	3–1	China

Shivaji Stadium, New Delhi

==== Final round ====
Semifinals
29 November
Malaysia	0
Pakistan	2
29 November
India	7
Japan	2

Final
1 December
Pakistan	7
India	1
Bronze medal match
30 November
Malaysia	3
Japan	0

===== Semifinals =====
29 November

Pakistan	2–0	Malaysia

Shivaji Stadium, New Delhi

29 November

India	7–2	Japan

Shivaji Stadium, New Delhi

===== Bronze medal match =====
30 November

Malaysia	3–0	Japan

Shivaji Stadium, New Delhi

===== Final =====
1 December

Pakistan	7–1	India

Shivaji Stadium, New Delhi

=== Standings ===
Team	Pld	W	D	L	GF	GA	GD	Pts
India	5	5	0	0	37	1	+36	10
South Korea	5	3	1	1	17	8	+9	7
Malaysia	5	3	1	1	7	6	+1	7
Japan	5	2	0	3	15	8	+7	4
Singapore	5	1	0	4	4	11	−7	2
Hong Kong	5	0	0	5	1	47	−46	0

=== Matches ===
20 November

India	22–0	Hong Kong

Shivaji Stadium, New Delhi

20 November

Malaysia	1–1	South Korea

Shivaji Stadium, New Delhi

21 November

Malaysia	3–0	Hong Kong

Shivaji Stadium, New Delhi

21 November

South Korea	5–0	Singapore

Shivaji Stadium, New Delhi

21 November

India	3–0	Japan

Shivaji Stadium, New Delhi

22 November

Malaysia	1–0	Singapore

Shivaji Stadium, New Delhi

22 November

India	5–1	South Korea

Shivaji Stadium, New Delhi

22 November

Japan	11–0	Hong Kong

Shivaji Stadium, New Delhi

23 November

Japan	1–0	Singapore

Shivaji Stadium, New Delhi

24 November

India	4–0	Malaysia

Shivaji Stadium, New Delhi

24 November

South Korea	7–0	Hong Kong

Shivaji Stadium, New Delhi

25 November

Japan	1–2	Malaysia

Shivaji Stadium, New Delhi

25 November

Singapore	4–1	Hong Kong

Shivaji Stadium, New Delhi

26 November

Japan	2–3	South Korea

Shivaji Stadium, New Delhi

26 November

India	3–0	Singapore

Shivaji Stadium, New Delhi
