= Darzamat =

Polish metal band

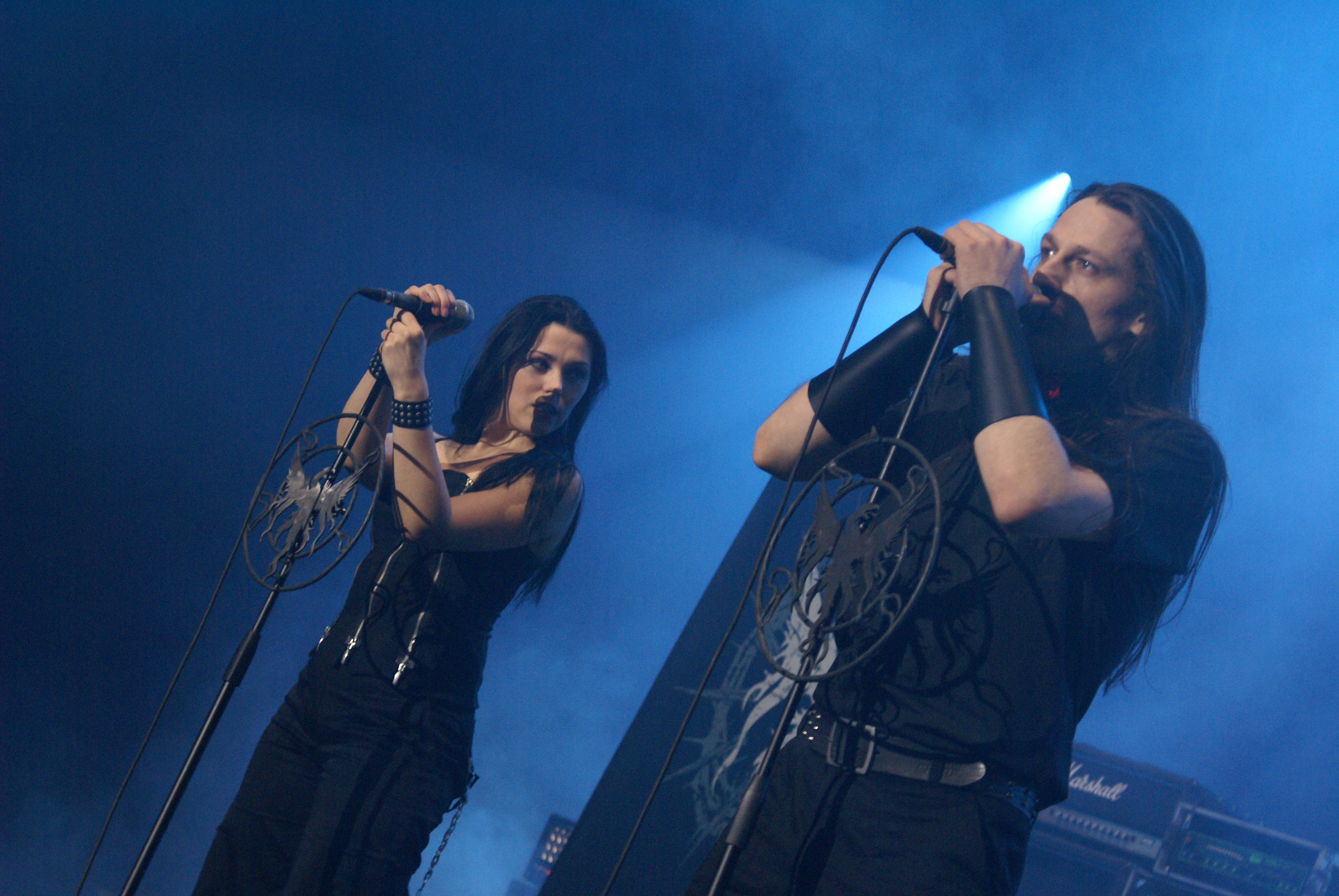
- Agnieszka "Nera" Górecka and Rafał "Flauros" Góral, 2007

Background information
- Origin: Katowice, Poland
- Genre: Symphonic black metal • Gothic metal
- Years active: 1995 - present
- Labels: Faithless Productions, Avantgarde Music, Metal Mind Productions, Massacre Records
- Members: Agnieszka "Nera" Górecka; Rafał "Flauros" Góral; Krzysztof "Chris" Michalak; Maciej "Darkside" Kowalski; Marek "Markus" Tkocz
- Website: www.darzamat.art.pl

Darzamat is a Polish gothic black metal band founded in 1995. After a few initial releases (In Flames of Black Arts, Oniriad and the MCD In the Opium of Black Veil), founding member Flauros (vocals) recruited musicians who became the band's core: guitar players Chris and Daamr, female vocalist Nera, and keyboard player Spectre. The album Semidevilish, released in 2004, established the band's sound, after which they started appearing more often on stage.

The following year, they released Transkarpatia, produced by Andy LaRocque, who has played guitar with King Diamond. Darzamat performed at Rock Hard Open, Wave Gothic Treffen, Hard Rock Laager, S-Hammer Festival, Last Night on Earth, Dong Open Festival, Moscow After Midnight and Metal Head Mission. The band also performed for increasing audiences in the Balkan states, Czech Republic, Slovakia, Belgium, Holland, Italy, France and Germany. Darzamat has toured supporting Sabaton in Benelux countries and Moonspell in Poland.

In 2007, the band performed at Winternachtstraum Festival and on the 21st edition of the Polish Metalmania Festival, organized since the 1980s. This performance was documented on the DVD Live Profanity (Visiting the Graves of the Heretics), released internationally.

In 2009, Darzamat signed with Massacre Records and released their fifth album, Solfernus’ Path, also available in Japan. Solfernus’ Path was a concept album. LaRocque moved from production to contributing a solo on ‘"The King of the Burning Anthems". The song, along with "Pain Collector" and "Chimera", were selected to promote the album. Videos were shot for all three. Darzamat toured Poland, Mexico, France, Czech Republic, Ukraine and Belgium, then returned to Poland to appear at the Castle Party Festival.

In 2011, the band took a break. Nera focused on her solo project, NeraNature, which features atmospheric rock with electronics. She released three albums; the latest, MagJa, was released in 2018. Flauros brought back black metal act Mastiphal. In 2011, Parvzya (Witching Hour) was released, the first album since the 1995 debut For a Glory of All Evil Spirits...

In 2019, Darzamat announced The Burning Kingdom, another concept album picking up where its predecessor left off. Flauros revealed that this chapter would take place in London. He Jesion Kowal wrote the lyrics. The album eschews keyboards in favor of diversified and complex guitar sounds. Pre-production and recording sessions for The Burning Kingdom were overseen by Maurycy ‘Mauser’ Stefanowicz of Vader. Production and mixing were handled by Polish producer, Jarosław Baran. The record was due for release in 2020.

== Band members ==
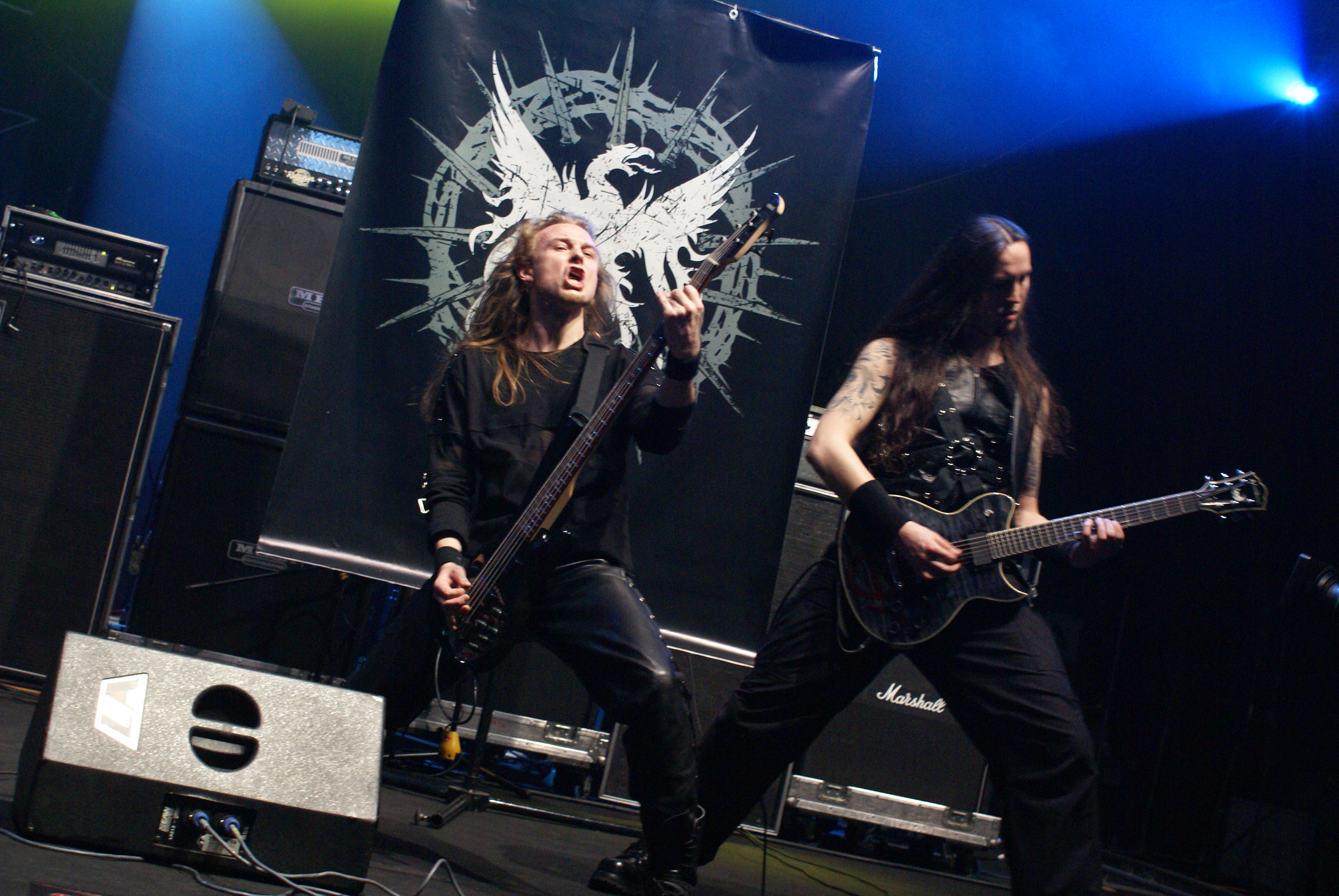
Krzysztof "Bacchus" Kłosek and Krzysztof "Chris" Michalak, 2007

=== Current ===
- Agnieszka "Nera" Górecka – vocals (2003–present)
- Rafał "Flauros" Góral – vocals (1995–present)
- Krzysztof "Chris" Michalak – guitar, bass guitar, compositions, engineering, mixing (2001–present)
- Marek "Markus" Tkocz – bass (2009–present)

=== Former ===
- Szymon "Simon" Strużek – bass, Guitars, Keyboards, Programming (1995–2003)
- Katarzyna "Kate" Banaszak – vocals (1996-2002)
- Krystian "Bomba" Bytom – drums (1997-1999)
- Damian "Daamr" Kowalski – guitars (1997–2004, 2007–2008), bass (2003–2004, 2007–2008)
- Paweł Chudzicki – drums (1999-2002)
- Karolina Widera – vocals (2002)
- Tomasz "Golem" Dańczak – drums (2003–2006)
- Patryk "Spectre" Kumór – keyboards (2003–2009)
- Krzysztof "Xycho" Kłosek – bass (2004–2007)
- Piotr "Lestath" Leszczyński – drums (2007–2008)
- Maciej "Darkside" Kowalski – drums (2006-2007, 2009–2011)
- Paweł "Senator" Nowak – drums (2011–2015)

== Discography ==
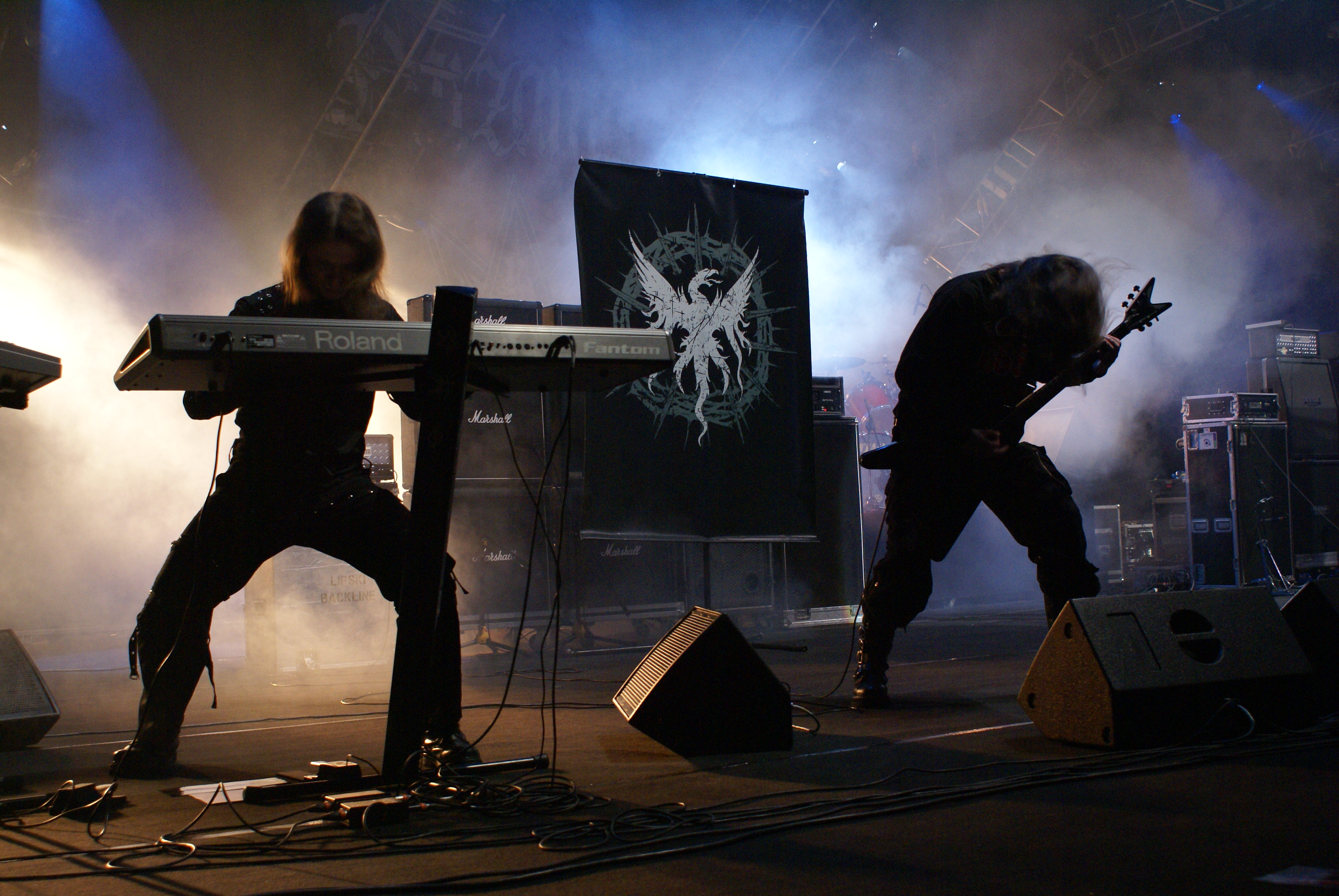
Patryk "Spectre" Kumór and Damian "Daamr" Kowalski, 2007

=== Studio albums ===
- In the Flames of Black Art (1997)
- Oniriad (2003)
- Semidevilish (2004)
- Transkarpatia (2005)
- Solfernus' Path (2009)
- A Philosopher at the End of the Universe (2020)

=== EPs ===
- In the Opium of Black Veil (1999)

=== Video albums ===
Title	Album details
Live Profanity (Visiting the Graves of Heretics)	Released: July 30, 2007; Label: Metal Mind Productions; Formats: DVD

=== Music videos ===
Title	Year	Directed	Album
2003	"When The Dreams Died"	—	Oniriad
2004	"In Red Iris"	Michał Sosna	SemiDevilish
2005	"The Burning Times"	Beniamin Szwed	Transkarpatia
