= Rajinder Singh Sr. =

Indian field hockey player

Personal information
- Nationality: India
- Born: 7 January 1958 (age 68) Amritsar, Punjab, India

Sport
- Sport: Field hockey
- Event: Men's team
Medal record
Men's field hockey
Representing India
Olympic Games
Gold medal – first place	1980 Moscow	Team
Asian Games
Silver medal – second place	1982 Delhi	Team

Rajinder Singh Sr., is an Indian field hockey player and coach. He played for Railways in the Indian Senior National Hockey Championship. He was part of the Indian teams that won the gold medal at the 1980 Summer Olympics and silver medal at the 1982 Asian Games. He was a defender and a noted penalty corner expert who top scored for India at the 1981-82 World Cup scoring 12 goals for India in that world cup. He coached the India men's U-21 team to the 2001 Junior World Cup title and the India men's team to the 2003 Asia Cup title.
