= Henk Bouwman =

Dutch field hockey player (1926–1995)

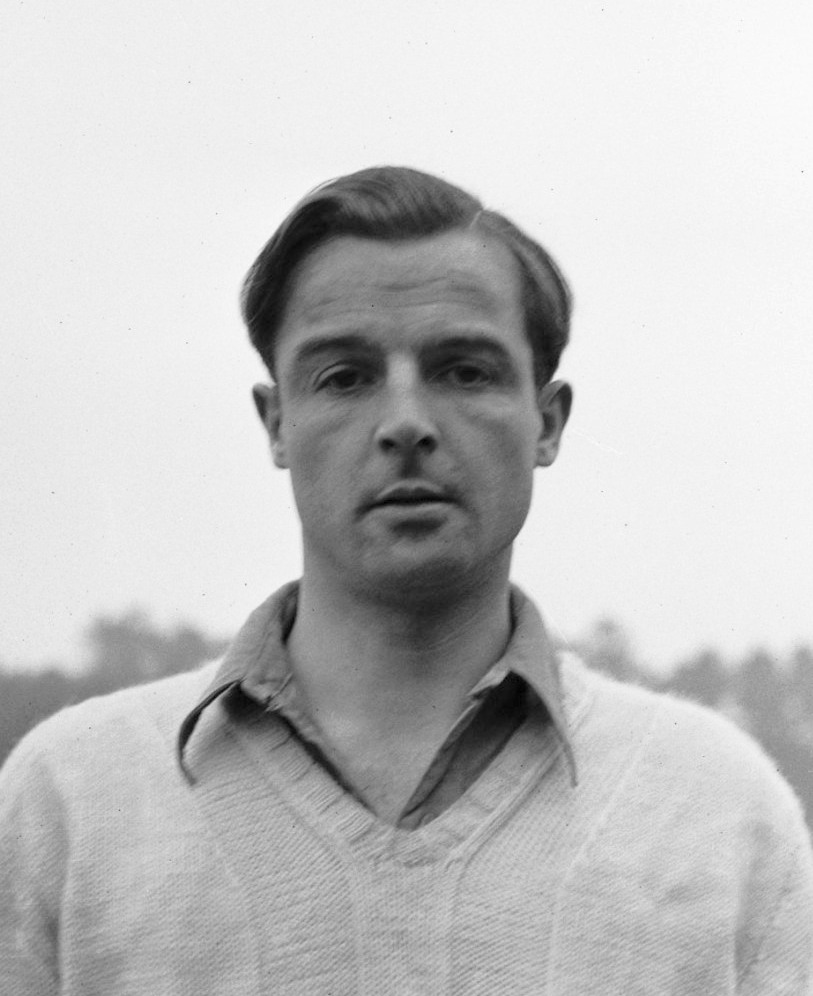
- Henk Bouwman in 1956

Personal information
- Born: 30 June 1926 Amsterdam, Netherlands
- Died: 27 December 1995 (aged 69) Baarn, Netherlands

Sport
- Sport: Field hockey
- Club: HC Bloemendaal
Medal record
Representing the Netherlands
Olympic Games
Bronze medal – third place	1948 London	Team competition

Henricus "Henk" Nicolaas Bouwman (30 June 1926 – 27 December 1995) was a Dutch field hockey player who won a bronze medal at the 1948 Summer Olympics in London. His son Roderik also became an Olympic field hockey player.
