= Oniriad =

Studio album by Darzamat
- Released: 2003
- Recorded: October, 2001 – March, 2002; The Post Street Studio, Poland
- Genre: Symphonic black metal Gothic metal
- Length: 42:09
- Label: Avantgarde Music; Wounded Love Productions
- Producer: Self-produced

Darzamat chronology
In the Opium of Black Veil (1999)	Oniriad (2003)	Semidevilish (2004)

Professional ratings
Review scores
Source	Rating
Lords of Metal	link

Oniriad is the third album by the Polish symphonic black metal band Darzamat which was released in 2003 and was recorded at their own studio The Post Street Studio in Poland. The album was self-produced and it took them nearly two years to prepare all the new material. The main reason why it took so long was that the band had been building their own studio. Five months work in The Post Street Studio has brought 42 minutes of music and nine compositions. The band had personnel issues too. By the time Oniriad was prepared to be released, Kowalski had left band and started his own project called Eclipse. Chudzicki known as Mastiphal musician, joined the group. Katarzyna Banaszak left Darzamat and had gone to USA. She had been replaced by Karolina Widera after she left.

== Track listing ==
1. "Into the Abyss of Forgotten Woods" – 4:40
2. "The Longest Journey" – 5:23
3. "Nameless" – 4:51
4. "Beauty" – 5:29
5. "Time" – 4:38
6. "Moon Has Imprisoned Me in Her Shine" – 3:37
7. "When the Dreams Died" – 4:39
8. "Elegy" – 3:41
9. "Soporific" – 5:11

== Personnel ==
- Katarzyna "Kate" Banaszak – vocals
- Rafał "Flauros" Góral – vocals, lyrics
- Szymon Struzek – bass guitar, programming, compositions
- Krzysztof "Chris" Michalak – electric guitar, compositions, engineering, mixing
- Pawel Chudzicki – drums
- Bartlomiej Krawczyk – compositions
