= Gangotri Bhandari =

Indian field hockey player

Medal record
Women's field hockey
Representing India
Asian Games
Gold medal – first place	1982 Delhi	Team competition

Gangotri (Bhandari) Bist (13 August, 1956 – 10 March, 2026) was a former olympian and international hockey player who played for the Indian Women's Hockey Team. She represented India at the 1980 Summer Olympics and 1982 Asian Games along with many other international tournaments. She had also been the vice captain for Indian Women's Hockey Team during the Asian Hockey Championship in Kyoto, Japan in 1981. Post her professional sports career - she worked for NWR Railways as chief office superintendent and lived with her beloved family in Jaipur, Rajasthan.

== Personal life ==
Gangotri (Bhandari) Bist was born at Pauri Garhwal. She was the first daughter of her parents, and had two siblings. She shifted to Jaipur in 1966 and started playing field hockey as a hobby during her schooling and later played for India at national and international levels.

== Career ==
=== National tournaments ===
Year	Tournament
1974	XI Jnr Women' National Hockey Championship in Trivandrum
1974	Senior Women's National Hockey Championship in Jaipur
1976	XXX Senior Women's Hockey National Championship in Goa
1976	XXX Women's Hockey National Championship in Pune (Runners up)
1976	II National Sports Festival for Women in New Delhi
1977	All India Guru Nanak Women's Hockey in Chandigarh
1977	Inter Zonal Hockey Championship in Patiala (Gold Medal)
1977	Inter Railway Women's Hockey Championship (Winner)
1978	Inter Railway Women's Hockey Championship (Winner)
1980	Rajasthan State Women's Sports Festival in Ajmer
1980	V National Sports Festival for Women in Jabalpur
1980	Abel David Memorial Trophy in Pune (Winner)
1980	34th Women's Hockey Championship in Indore (Winner)
1981	XXXV Senior National Women's Hockey Championship in Ahemdabad (Winner)
1982	II Begum Rasul Trophy Tournament in Pune (Gold Medal)
1982	XXXVI al Women's Hockey Championship in Calicut (Winner)

=== International tournaments ===
1979	2nd World Hockey Championship at Vancouver Canada
1980	Olympic Games in MOSCO (4th place)
1981	Asian Hockey Championship KYOTO Japan (Gold Medal)
1981	Querdr Angular Tournament at Japan (Gold Medal)
1982	Indo/German test match in India (Winner)
1982	Begam Resool Tournament at Pune (Gold Medal)
1982	Indo/German test match in Germany (Winner)
1982	Indo/Russia test match in Moscow
1982	Indo/Russia test match in India (Winner)
1982	IX Asian Games Delhi (Gold Medal)
1983	World Cup at Kuala Lumpur

== Achievements ==
Gangotri (Bhandari) Bist played for the Indian Women's Hockey Team in 1980 MOSCOW Olympics where the team stood 4th position.

She also played in 2nd World Hockey Championship at Vancouver, Canada in 1979 and World Cup at Kuala Lumpur, Malaysia in 1983.

=== Gold Medals ===
Year	Tournament
1982	IX Asian Games at Delhi
1981	Asian Hockey Championship KYOTO Japan
1981	Querdr Angular Tournament at Japan
1982	Begam Rasool Tournament at Pune

=== Awards ===
Year	Award
1982	Manik Swarn Padak
1984	Rajat Jayanti Puraskar
1985	The Eminent Youth
1989	Aravali Award
1991	Nahar Samman Puraskar
1994	Maharana Pratap Award
