= Nazleen Madraswalla =

Indian field hockey player (born 1962)

Personal information
- Nationality: Indian
- Born: 6 September 1962 (age 63)

Sport
- Sport: Field hockey
Medal record
Women's field hockey
Representing India
Asian Games
Gold medal – first place	1982 Delhi	Team competition

Nazleen Madraswalla (born 6 September 1962) is an Indian field hockey player. She competed in the women's tournament at the 1980 Summer Olympics.

== Career ==
Madraswalla played for the Kayani Club in Pune domestically and represented Maharashtra in the national championships.
