= Krzysztof Kłosek =

Polish singer and bass guitarist

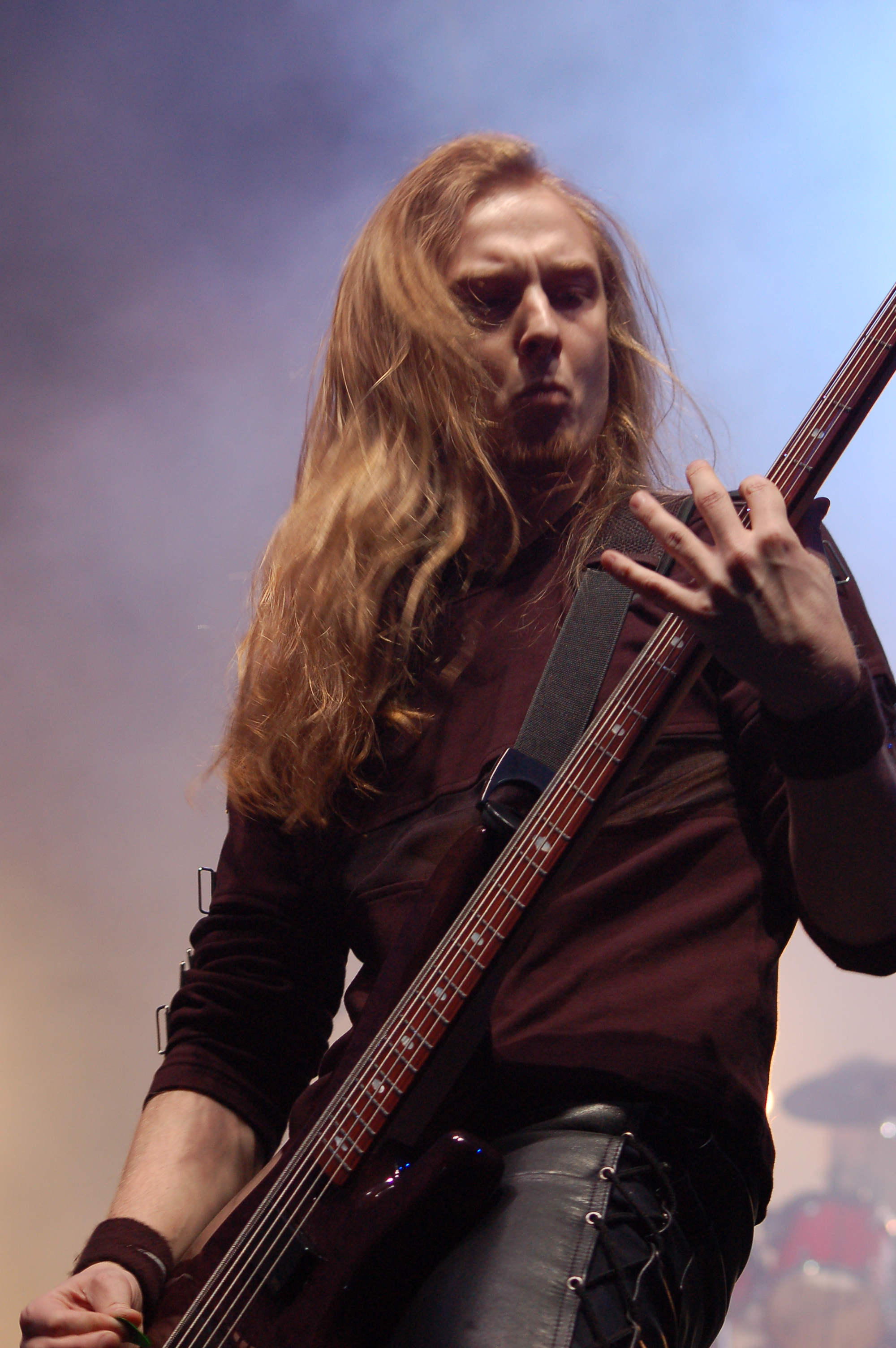
Krzysztof Kłosek

Krzysztof Kłosek (Świętochłowice, 16 July 1978) is a Polish singer and bass guitarist.

He has been a member of Horrorscope (2010 to 2012), Black From The Pit (2003 to 2012), Darzamat (2005 to 2007), Thorn.S (1999 to 2005 and 2008 to 2010) and Killjoy (2008 and 2009 to 2010).

== Discography ==
- Thorn.S – From the Inside (1999)
- Thorn.S – Place Of No Return (2001)
- Thorn.S – Promo MMIII (2003)
- Black From The Pit – Doublecrow Soul (2004)
- Darzamat – Transkarpatia (2005)
- Darzamat – Live Profanity (Visiting the Graves of Heretic) (2007)
