= Ken Barrett (Australian footballer) =

Australian rules footballer

Personal information
- Full name: Ken Barrett
- Born: 2 October 1939 (age 87)
- Original team: Stratford
- Height: 178 cm (5 ft 10 in)
- Weight: 71 kg (157 lb)

Playing career^{1}
Years	Club	Games (Goals)
1960	South Melbourne	2 (0)
- ^{1} Playing statistics correct to the end of 1960.

Ken Barrett (born 2 October 1939) is a former Australian rules footballer who played with South Melbourne in the Victorian Football League (VFL).
