= Wayne Grimmer =

Canadian field hockey player

Wayne Grimmer (born 21 May 1960) is a Canadian former field hockey player who competed in the 1988 Summer Olympics.
