= David Westcott =

British field hockey player (born 1957)

Personal information
- Born: 14 May 1957 (age 69) London, England
- Height: 174 cm (5 ft 9 in)
- Weight: 70 kg (154 lb)

Sport
- Sport: Field hockey
Senior career
Years	Team	Caps	Goals
1977–1981	Oxford University	-	-
1979–1983	St Albans	-	-
1983–1984	Southgate	-	-
National team
Years	Team	Caps	Goals
–	Great Britain		-
–	England		-
Medal record
Men's field hockey
Representing Great Britain
Olympic Games
Bronze medal – third place	1984 Los Angeles	Team competition
Champions Trophy
Bronze medal – third place	1978 Lahore	Team competition

David Guy Westcott (born 14 May 1957) is a former field hockey player, who won a bronze medal at the 1984 Summer Olympics.

== Biography ==
Westcott was educated at Cranleigh School and studied at Brasenose College, Oxford. He played hockey for the University of Oxford team and was also a competetent cricket player.

While at Oxford University, he was part of the bronze medal winning Great Britain team that competed at the inaugural 1978 Men's Hockey Champions Trophy, in Lahore, Pakistan and also played club hockey for St Albans in the Men's England Hockey League.

As a St Albans player, he was selected for the Great Britain team for the 1980 Olympic Games in Moscow, but subsequently did not attend due to the boycott. He did however play for Great Britain in the 1980 Men's Hockey Champions Trophy and for England at the 1981 Men's Hockey Champions Trophy and 1982 Men's Hockey World Cup in Bombay.

He signed for Southgate Hockey Club from the 1983/84 season. At the 1984 Olympic Games in Los Angeles, he represented Great Britain in the hockey tournament, winning a bronze medal for the team.

Westcott is a retired barrister specialising in personal injury and clinical negligence. He was appointed as one of Her Majesty's Queen's Counsel in 2003. He is a member of Outer Temple Chambers.
