= Mastiphal (band) =

- Origin: Katowice, Poland
- Genres: Black Metal
- Years active: 1992-1998, 2009-present
- Labels: Witching Hour Productions
- Members: Flauros - vocals, bass guitar Cymeris - vocals, guitar Daamr - guitar (2010-); Opressor - guitar, bass guitar (2010-); Senator - percussion (2010-)
- Past members: Sammach - keyboard (1995-1996); Desecrator - keyboard (1992-1994); Sarceuil - percussion (1992-1996); Paul - percussion (1996-1998); Abigor - bass guitar (1992-1996)
- Website: http://www.myspace.com/mastiphalofficial

Mastiphal is a Polish black metal band. It was founded in Katowice in 1992, initially named Dissolution, thanks to effort of Rafał "Flauros" Góral (later a vocalist for Darzamat) and Cymeris (in latter years associated with Iperyt). A year later the band has been renamed to Mastiphal.

They released one LP: For A Glory Of All Evil Spirits Rise For Victory (1996), two demos: Sowing Profane Seed (1994) and Promo'96; and an EP Seed of Victory (1998), after which the band split up.

It was reactivated in 2009. In September that year a Białystok label Witching Hour Productions released a two-disc issue Damnatio Memoriae, including all past songs by Mastiphal. In 2010 the band was joined by guitar players Damian "Daamr" Kowalski and "Opressor", and also percussist Paweł "Senator" Nowak.

== Discography ==
=== Studio albums ===
- For a Glory of all Evil Spirits, Rise for Victory (1995, Baron Records, Nocturn Records)
- Parvzya (2011, Witching Hour Productions)

=== Other ===
- Sowing Profane Seed (EP, 1994, Baron Records)
- Seed of Victory (Compilation, 1996, Vox Mortiis)
- Damnatio Memoriae (Compilation, 2009, Witching Hour Productions)

=== Featured ===
- Czarne zastępy – W hołdzie KAT ("Black Hosts – tribute to KAT") (1998, Pagan Records)
- A Tribute to Hell (1998, Full Moon Production)
