= Shivaji Hockey Stadium =

Sports venue in New Delhi, India

- Shivaji Stadium
- Full name: Shivaji Hockey Stadium
- Former names: Shivaji Stadium
- Location: New Delhi, India
- Owner: New Delhi Municipal Corporation
- Operator: New Delhi Municipal Corporation
- Capacity: 7,000

Construction
- Built: 1964
- Opened: 1964
- Rebuilt: 2008

Tenant
- India women's national field hockey team

Shivaji Hockey Stadium is a hockey stadium located in New Delhi, India. The stadium was one that was selected to host hockey matches for 2010 Commonwealth Games but stadium was not ready before the games as construction of seating facilities and one venues which was come controversies of Commonwealth Games.

In 2004, the stadium was identified as home for India women's hockey team and selected venue for the practice venue for hockey and swimming but later its changed to Dhyan Chand National Stadium and SPM Swimming Pool Complex.

The stadium has been a host for games of India's UBA Pro Basketball League as well.

== Features ==
- Synthetic surfaces
- Parking lot of 1500 vehicles with multi-levels
- Changing rooms, physio rooms etc.

== Transport ==
Shivaji Stadium metro station is just under a Km from Shivaji Hockey Stadium.
