= Hardeep Singh (field hockey) =

Indian field hockey player

Olympic medal record

Men's Field Hockey

Asian Games
Bronze medal – third place	1986 Seoul	Team

Hardeep Singh Grewal (born 1960) is an Indian field hockey player. He competed at the 1984 Summer Olympics in Los Angeles, where the Indian team placed fifth. He completed 10th from Govt. School PAU. After he studied at Arya college. He played in Hockey team. And represented district, state, country at many levels.
