= David McMichael =

American field hockey player

Personal information
- Born: April 22, 1961 (age 65) Philadelphia, Pennsylvania, United States

Sport
- Sport: Field hockey

David McMichael (born April 22, 1961) is an American field hockey player. He competed in the men's tournament at the 1984 Summer Olympics.
