= Gert Jan Schlatmann =

Dutch field hockey player

Medal record

Men's Field hockey

Representing Netherlands

Olympic Games
Bronze medal – third place	1988 Seoul	Team Competition

Gert Jan Schlatmann (born 6 December 1963) is a former Dutch field hockey player, who earned a total of 50 caps, scoring fourteen goals in the 1980s for the Netherlands national field hockey team.

Schlatmann was born in Bloemendaal, North Holland. Playing club hockey for HC Bloemendaal, the striker and midfielder was a member of the bronze medal-winning Dutch team at the 1988 Summer Olympics in Seoul.
