= Randy Lipscher =

American hockey player

Randolph B. "Randy" Lipscher (born September 20, 1960) is an American former Olympic field hockey goalie.

== Early life ==
Lipscher was born in Boston, Massachusetts, lives in Austin, Texas He attended Carnegie Mellon University, and studied biochemistry at Rutgers University. He attended medical school at University of Texas, and received his MBA from University of Chicago. He is 5 feet 10 inches (178 cm) tall, and weighs 174 pounds (79 kg). Sports Illustrated called him "the Jewish street hockey player from New Jersey.". Lipscher is Jewish.

== Career ==
Lipscher first played for the Fair Lawn, New Jersey, Flyers, a street hockey team.

Lipscher began playing field hockey in 1976, He played for eight years with the North Jersey Hockey Club, in Peapack-Gladstone. Lipscher played for one year with the Springfield Hockey Club in Preston, England.

He was on the national junior team from 1978 to 1981. Lipscher was named Athlete of the Year in 1981 by the United States Olympic committee, after leading his team to the semifinals of the Junior World Cup in Santiago Chile. During that tournament Lipscher stopped 2 penalty shots from Mexico leading to a US victory over Mexico 2–1. He also stopped a penalty from Argentina in a narrow 1-0 Loss.

Lipscher was a US national member from 1982 to 1984. Lipscher gathered over 50 caps playing for the United States. He was considered one of the best Goalkeepers in the world during his sporting career.

Lipscher made Team USA, representing the United States at the 1984 Summer Olympics in field hockey as goal keeper.

Currently Lipscher is an assistant professor of Emergency Medicine at the University of Texas Health Science Center.

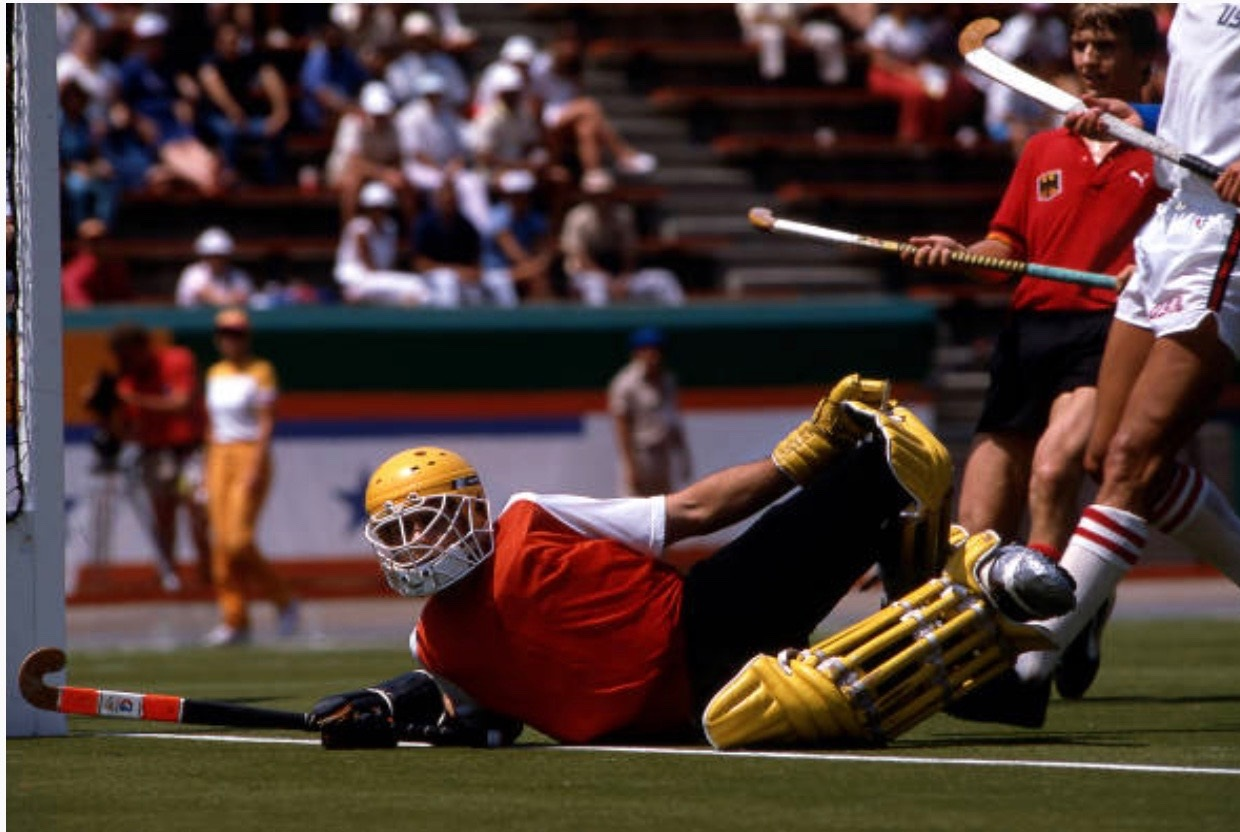
Lipscher during a game
