= Marcelo Pazos =

Argentine field hockey player

Personal information
- Nationality: Argentine
- Born: 23 November 1953 (age 72)

Sport
- Sport: Field hockey

Marcelo Pazos (born 23 November 1953) is an Argentine field hockey player. He competed in the men's tournament at the 1976 Summer Olympics.
