= Nigel Traverso =

American field hockey player

Personal information
- Nationality: American
- Born: 18 November 1958 (age 67) Trinidad and Tobago

Sport
- Sport: Field hockey

Nigel Traverso (born 18 November 1958) is an American former field hockey player. He competed in the 1984 Summer Olympics in Los Angeles.

== Personal life ==
Traverso was born in Trinidad and Tobago on 18 November 1958 and grew up in Port of Spain. He emigrated with his family to the United States in 1977, settling in Queens. He gained U.S. citizenship in 1982.
