= Yahya Atan =

Malaysian field hockey player (1954–2022)

Personal information
- Nationality: Malaysian
- Born: 4 August 1954 Kampung Melayu Majidee, Johor, Malaya
- Died: 27 February 2022 (aged 67) Kuala Lumpur, Malaysia

Sport
- Sport: Field hockey

Yahya Atan (4 August 1954 – 27 February 2022) was a Malaysian field hockey player. He competed at the 1984 Summer Olympics in Los Angeles, where the Malaysian team placed 11th.

He also coached the national junior World Cup team that finished 12th at the 2001 Tasmania Hockey Junior World Cup.

He died from a stroke in Kuala Lumpur on 27 February 2022, at the age of 67.
