= Robert Gregg (field hockey) =

American hockey player

Personal information
- Nationality: American
- Born: June 9, 1954 (age 72) Lancaster, Pennsylvania, United States

Sport
- Sport: Field hockey

Robert Gregg (born June 9, 1954) is an American field hockey player. He competed in the men's tournament at the 1984 Summer Olympics.
