= Neil Francis (field hockey) =

British field hockey player

Sport
- Sport: Field hockey
- Position: Forward
1978–1983	Guildford	-	-
1983–1985	Northampton Saints	-	-
National team
Years	Team	Caps	Goals
–	England & Great Britain		-

Neil Francis is a former British hockey international.

== Biography ==
Francis played club hockey for Guildford Hockey Club in the Men's England Hockey League. He was capped by England both outdoors and indoors and helped England finish second in the 1978 Four Nations indoor tournament. Francis also represented Surrey at county level.

While at Guildford he was selected by England for the 1981 Men's Hockey Champions Trophy and the 1982 Men's Hockey World Cup in Bombay.

The following year he competed in the 1983 Men's EuroHockey Nations Championship in Amstelveen, Netherlands, where England finished in fifth place.

He left Guildford to join Northampton Saints Hockey Club and also played cricket for the club after retiring from hockey in 1986.
