= Kulbir Bhaura =

British field hockey player (born 1955)

Personal information
- Full name: Kulbir Singh Bhaura
- Born: 15 October 1955 (age 70) Jullundur, Punjab, India
- Height: 178 cm (5 ft 10 in)
- Weight: 72 kg (159 lb)

Sport
- Sport: Field hockey
- Position: Forward
Senior career
| Years | Team | Caps | Goals |
| 1979–1986 | Hounslow | - | - |
| 1986-2000 | Indian Gymkhana | - | - |
National team
| Years | Team | Caps | Goals |
| 1983–1988 | Great Britain | 61 | - |
| 1979–1988 | England | 84 | - |
Medal record
Men's field hockey
Representing Great Britain
Olympic Games
| Gold medal – first place | 1988 Seoul | Team competition |
| Bronze medal – third place | 1984 Los Angeles | Team competition |
Champions Trophy
| Bronze medal – third place | 1984 Karachi | Team competition |
| Silver medal – second place | 1985 Perth | Team competition |
Representing England
World Cup
| Silver medal – second place | 1986 London | Team competition |
European Championship
| Silver medal – second place | 1987 Moscow | Team |

Kulbir Singh Bhaura (born 15 October 1955) is an Indian-born British former field hockey player. He was a member of the gold winning Great Britain squad at the 1988 Summer Olympics in Seoul.

== Biography ==
Bhaura was born in Jullundur, East Punjab, India, into a Sikh family and came to England in 1968. He was educated at the Khalsa School Jalandhar in India and then Featherstone School in Southall. Bhaura played club hockey for Hounslow Hockey Club in the Men's England Hockey League and made his England debut on 25 March 1979 against Belgium and his Great Britain debut on 11 December 1983 against Pakistan.

He played at the 1982 Men's Hockey World Cup and at the 1984 Olympic Games in Los Angeles, he represented Great Britain in the hockey tournament and secured the bronze medal with his team.

Bhaura was also a member of the silver medal-winning team in 1986 Men's Hockey World Cup in London. and 1987 European Cup in Moscow. He played at international level for nine years for England and Great Britain. A proud moment was when he was selected to represent World XI to play against Australia in 1987.

Bhaura joined Indian Gymkhana Hockey Club and it was while playing for them that he won the Olympic gold in 1988, he retired from international hockey and had earned 84 caps for England and 61 for Great Britain.

He started working within the hockey industry, in marketing and developing equipment. He has visited hockey factories in India and Pakistan, developing hockey and cricket equipment under the brand name Pantheon. He was also involved in developing goalkeeping equipment and owned a ball manufacturing plant, "Chingford Balls". Bhaura owned The Pro Shop, specialising in hockey equipment and team-wear, based in Brentford (W London) and Hitchin (Hertfordshire). He was a European distributor of the Gryphon Hockey brand since 1996. After selling the retail, wholesale and manufacturing operations in 2019, he now enjoys his retirement.

Bhaura is a prominent member of the Indian Gymkhana Hockey Club based in Osterley in W London and continues to play and coach hockey there to this day.
