= Pangambam Nilakomol Singh =

Indian field hockey player

Nilakomol Singh
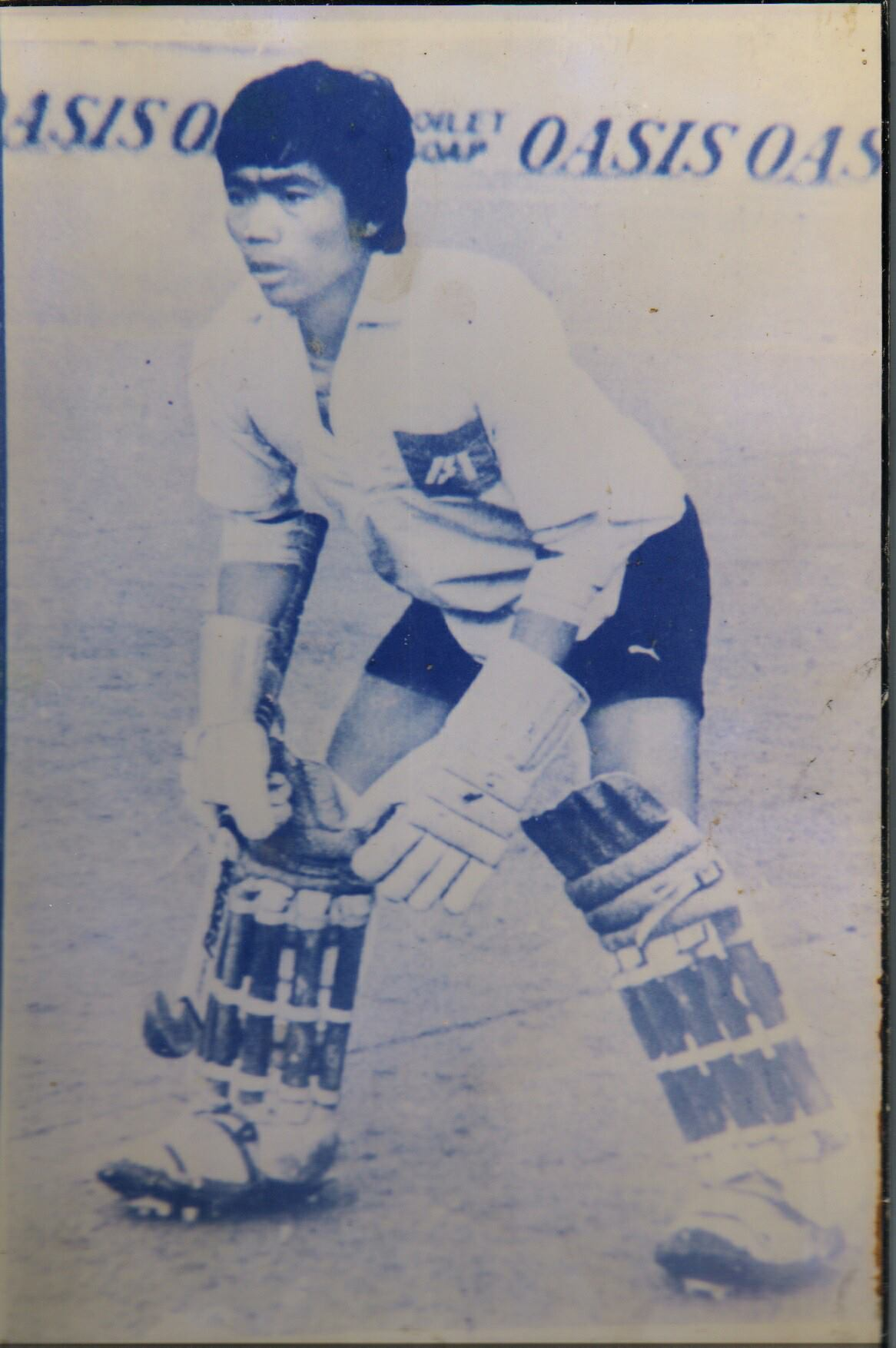

Personal information
- Full name: Pangambam Nilakomol Singh
- Born: 1 March 1955 (age 71) Manipur, India
- Height: 5 ft 7 in (170 cm)

Sport
- Sport: Field hockey
- Position: Goalkeeper
Senior career
Years	Team	Caps	Goals
–	Indian Airlines	-	-
National team
Years	Team	Caps	Goals
–	India		-
Medal record
Representing India
Men's field hockey
Asian Games
Bronze medal – third place	1986 Seoul	Team

Pangambam Nilakomol Singh is regarded as "the first Olympian of Manipur (India)". He represented India at the 1984 Summer Olympics in Los Angeles in field hockey. He was born on 1 March 1955 at Moirangkhom Bokulmakhong, Imphal. Son of the late P. Babu Singh and Ibeton Devi. He graduated in 1981, from Imphal College. He started playing hockey from early childhood. He was selected to represent Manipur State in the Senior National Hockey Championship held at Hyderabad in 1979. He had also played for Manipur State Junior Hockey Team in the National Junior Hockey Championship held at Jabalpur (1980), Kolhapur (1981) and Meerut (1982).

He represented India in the Indo-Pak Hockey Test Match series, held at Pakistan and India in 1982 and was adjudged the best player. He became a regular playing member of the Indian National Junior Hockey Team which played test matches at Spain, France and West Germany in 1982. He played for Indian Senior National Hockey Team in the Essanda International Hockey Tournament held at Melbourne in December 1982. He also played for India in the Pentengular International Hockey Tournament held at Kuala-lumpur and 4 Nations International Hockey Tournament held at West Berlin in 1983. He represented Indian National Hockey Team in the 23rd World Summer Olympics held at Los Angeles in July and August 1984. He also played the 6th World Cup held in London 1986 and the Xth Asian Games 1986 held in Seoul.

In recognition of his distinguished service in the development of sports in the North East, he has been nominated to represent the North Eastern Region as a member of the Governing body and the General body of the Sports Authority of India.

== See also ==
- Field hockey at the 1984 Summer Olympics – Men's team squads
- Category:Field hockey players at the 1986 Asian Games
- Indian hockey team braces up for Los Angeles Olympics
