= Michael Kraus (field hockey) =

American hockey player

Personal information
- Nationality: American
- Born: January 24, 1958 (age 68) Frankfurt, Germany

Sport
- Sport: Field hockey

Michael Kraus (born January 24, 1958) is an American field hockey player. He competed in the men's tournament at the 1984 Summer Olympics.
