= Zulkifli Abbas =

Malaysian field hockey player (born 1956)

Personal information
- Nationality: Malaysian
- Born: 2 March 1956 (age 70)

Sport
- Sport: Field hockey
Medal record
Men's field hockey
Representing Malaysia
Asian Games
Bronze medal – third place	1982 New Delhi	Team

Zulkifli Abbas (born 2 March 1956) is a Malaysian field hockey player. He competed at the 1984 Summer Olympics in Los Angeles, where the Malaysian team placed 11th.
