= Brent Miskimmin =

New Zealand field hockey player

Brent Graydon Miskimmin (born 11 September 1956 in Christchurch) is a former field hockey player from New Zealand, who was a member of the national team that finished seventh at the 1984 Summer Olympics in Los Angeles. His two-year younger brother Peter was also on the side.
