= Gurtej Singh (athlete) =

Indian javelin thrower

Personal information
- Nationality: Indian
- Born: 15 October 1959 (age 66)

Sport
- Sport: Athletics
- Event: Javelin throw

Gurtej Singh (born 15 October 1959) is an Indian athlete. He competed in the men's javelin throw at the 1984 Summer Olympics.
