= Terry Leece =

Australian field hockey player

Personal information
- Nationality: Australian
- Born: 23 November 1957 (age 68)

Sport
- Sport: Field hockey

Terry Leece (born 23 November 1957) is an Australian field hockey player. He competed at the 1984 Summer Olympics in Los Angeles, where the Australian team placed fourth.
