= Maurice Marquet =

New Zealand field hockey player (born 1954)

Maurice Allan Marquet (born 3 February 1954) is a former field hockey player from New Zealand, who was a member of the national team that finished seventh at the 1984 Summer Olympics in Los Angeles. Marquet is a teacher and coaches hockey.

Maurice Allan Marquet was born on 3 February 1954 in Christchurch, New Zealand. He grew up in his birth city and attended Linwood High School. He played hockey, always as a goalkeeper, for a variety of clubs. He moved to Auckland in 1976 and played for their provincial team. He first represented New Zealand in hockey in 1977. He was chosen to represent New Zealand at the 1980 Summer Olympics in Moscow, but did not go due to the Olympics boycott. Both he and his wife were teachers and in 1981, they moved to Lawrence for employment reasons. The intention was to join a hockey club in Dunedin some 90 kilometres (56 mi) away. Shortly after he announced his retirement over injury concerns, though.

By mid-1982, Marquet played for Otago's provincial team, announcing that he had overcome his injury concerns. By September 1982, Marquet was back in the national team. By November 1982, he had applied for teaching positions at three Canterbury schools. By mid-1983, Marquet still played for Otago but had another knee injury.

In May 1984, Marquet—still playing for Otago—was selected for the 1984 Summer Olympics in Los Angeles. He became New Zealand Olympian number 467 and the team came in seventh place at the Olympics.

In 1996, he was co-coach for the South Canterbury hockey team from Timaru. Three years later, he had been promoted to be the team's coach. In 1999, he was a teacher at Waimate High School. As of 2025, he is a teacher at Murchison Area School.
