= Soon Mustafa bin Karim =

Malaysian field hockey player (born 1963)

Personal information
- Nationality: Malaysian
- Born: 22 May 1963 (age 62)

Sport
- Sport: Field hockey

Soon Mustafa bin Karim (born 22 May 1963) is a Malaysian field hockey player. He competed at the 1984 Summer Olympics and the 1992 Summer Olympics.
