= Kevin Nunis =

Malaysian field hockey player (1959–2025)

Personal information
- Full name: Kevin Christopher Nunis
- Nationality: Malaysian
- Born: 18 September 1959 Seremban, Negeri Sembilan, Federation of Malaya
- Died: 28 June 2025 (aged 65) Kuala Lumpur, Malaysia

Sport
- Sport: Field hockey
Medal record
Men's field hockey
Representing Malaysia
Asian Games
Bronze medal – third place	1982 New Delhi	Team

Kevin Nunis (18 September 1959 – 28 June 2025) was a Malaysian field hockey player. He competed in the men's tournament at the 1984 Summer Olympics. He died on 28 June 2025, at the age of 65.
