= Trevor Fernandes =

Indian-American hockey player

Personal information
- Full name: Trevor Alexander Fernandes
- Born: November 21, 1949 (age 76) Zanzibar City, Zanzibar (now in Tanzania)

Sport
- Sport: Field hockey
Senior career
Years	Team	Caps	Goals
–	Seattle Field Hockey Club	-	-
National team
Years	Team	Caps	Goals
1965	Zanzibar		-
1971–1973	India		-
1984	United States		-

Trevor Alexander Fernandes (born November 21, 1949) is an Indian-American former field hockey player who competed in the men's tournament at the 1984 Summer Olympics. Born in Zanzibar, he represented India and United States internationally.

== Early life ==
Fernandes’ family hailed from Gaura Vaddo in Calangute. His father, Reginald Theoten worked for the British Government from 1926 to 1965 and was also the national coach. Both his brother, Mervyn, and sister, Beryl, played for Zanzibar.

== Sports career ==
=== Zanzibar ===
Fernandes started playing hockey in Zanzibar and even represented their the national team. In 1965, he scored a goal against Pakistan in a 2-1 defeat for Zanzibar. Fernandes played football for the Zanzibar First Division club Kikwajuni SC.

=== India ===
Upon returning to India in 1967, he played hockey for Goan sides. He played for two and a half years with the All-India University Team. He then went on to play for India in the Pesta Sukan regional hockey championship in Singapore and also played the Test matches against Great Britain in 1973.

=== United States ===
After emigrating to the United States, Fernandes graduated from the University of Washington in 1981, and then studied computer programming at North Seattle College. He received US citizenship in 1983 shortly before the 1984 Summer Olympics, which enabled him to play for the United States in Los Angeles.
