= Grant Mitton (field hockey) =

Australian field hockey player

Grant David Mitton (born 10 October 1962) is a field hockey player who played for South Australia and the Kookaburras in the 1980s. Mitton was a striker and represented his country in the 1984 Summer Olympics in Los Angeles as well as the 1986 Men's Hockey World Cup in London.

The perpetual shield for Hockey SA's U15 Boys State Junior Zone Championship is named after Grant.

== Personal ==
Grant lives in Western Australia. His son Trent Mitton plays for the WA Thundersticks and Kookaburras Australia men's national field hockey team, and his father is Don Mitton who represented Australia in hockey in a tour to New Zealand in 1958.

== Field Hockey ==
=== International hockey ===
Mitton played for Australia from 1983 to 1989 including an Olympic Games and World Cup.

Following is the list of major tournaments he played in:

- 1984 Olympic Games – Los Angeles – 4th place (Australia at the 1984 Summer Olympics)
- 1986 World Cup – London – GOLD (1986 Men's Hockey World Cup)
