= Robert Stiles =

American hockey player

Personal information
- Nationality: American
- Born: September 12, 1959 (age 66) Hackensack, New Jersey, United States

Sport
- Sport: Field hockey

Robert Stiles (born September 12, 1959) is an American field hockey player. He competed in the men's tournament at the 1984 Summer Olympics.
