= Treva King =

Australian field hockey player

Personal information
- Full name: Trevor King
- Born: 17 January 1956 (age 70)
- Height: 178 cm (5 ft 10 in)

Sport
- Country: Australia
- Sport: Field hockey
Medal record
Men's field hockey
Representing Australia
World Hockey Cup
Gold medal – first place	1986 London	Team

Trevor "Treva" King (born 17 January 1956) is an Australian field hockey player. He competed at the 1984 Summer Olympics in Los Angeles, where the Australian team placed fourth. He became world champion with Australia in 1986.
