= Hans Montag =

German field hockey player (born 1952)

Personal information
- Nationality: German
- Born: 21 January 1952 (age 74) Cologne, West Germany

Sport
- Sport: Field hockey

Hans Montag (born 21 January 1952) is a German field hockey player. He competed in the men's tournament at the 1976 Summer Olympics.
