= Roderik Bouwman =

Dutch field hockey player

Arnoldus Leonardus Henricus Roderik Bouwman (born 24 March 1957 in Haarlem) is a former Dutch field hockey player, who played 107 international matches for the Netherlands, in which the striker scored 82 goals.

He was a member of the Holland squad that finished sixth at the 1984 Summer Olympics in Los Angeles, California. Bouwman made his debut on 19 August 1978 in a friendly match against England. He played in the Dutch League for Amsterdam, Stichtse Cricket en Hockey Club and HGC. His father Henk was also a skillful field hockey player, who competed at the 1948 Summer Olympics in London.
