= Julius Akumu =

Kenyan field hockey player

Personal information
- Nationality: Kenyan
- Born: 17 June 1957 (age 68)

Sport
- Country: Kenya
- Sport: Field hockey

Julius Akumu (born 17 June 1957) is a Kenyan field hockey player. He competed at the 1984 Summer Olympics in Los Angeles, where the Kenyan team placed ninth.
