= Robin Wilson (field hockey) =

New Zealand field hockey player

Robin Wayne Wilson (born 4 October 1957 in Christchurch) is a former field hockey player from New Zealand, who was a member of the national team that finished seventh at the 1984 Summer Olympics in Los Angeles, United States.
