= Eric Otieno =

Kenyan field hockey player

Personal information
- Nationality: Kenyan
- Born: 20 January 1956 (age 70)

Sport
- Sport: Field hockey

Eric Otieno (born 20 January 1956) is a Kenyan field hockey player. He competed at the 1984 Summer Olympics in Los Angeles, where the Kenyan team placed ninth.
