= Sarabjit Singh Sehmi =

Kenyan hockey player

Personal information
- Nationality: Kenyan
- Born: 19 April 1963 (age 62)

Sport
- Sport: Field hockey
- Club: Railway Gymkhana, Nairobi

Sarabjit Singh Sehmi (born 19 April 1963) is a Kenyan field hockey player. He competed in the men's tournament at the 1984 Summer Olympics.
