= Neil Snowden =

Australian field hockey player

Personal information
- Born: 2 August 1959 (age 66)

Sport
- Sport: Field hockey

Neil Lindsey Snowden (born 2 August 1959) is an Australian field hockey player. He competed at the 1984 Summer Olympics in Los Angeles and the 1988 Summer Olympics in Seoul, both where the Australian team placed fourth.
