= José Agut =

Spanish field hockey player (born 1961)

José Agut (born 6 March 1961 in Terrassa) is a Spanish former field hockey player who competed in the 1984 Summer Olympics.
