= Ken Barrett (field hockey) =

American hockey player

Personal information
- Born: April 27, 1963 (age 63) Santa Monica, California, United States

Sport
- Sport: Field hockey

Ken Barrett (born April 27, 1963) is an American field hockey player. He competed in the men's tournament at the 1984 Summer Olympics.
