= Iqbaljit Singh Grewal =

Indian field hockey player

Personal information
- Nationality: Indian
- Born: 4 November 1959 (age 66)

Sport
- Sport: Field hockey

Iqbaljit Singh Grewal (born 4 November 1959) is an Indian field hockey player. He competed in the men's tournament at the 1984 Summer Olympics.
