= Marcellus Gomes =

Indian field hockey player (born 1961)

Personal information
- Nationality: Indian
- Born: 16 January 1961 (age 65)

Sport
- Sport: Field hockey
Medal record
Representing India
Men's field hockey
Asian Games
Silver medal – second place	1982 Delhi	Team

Marcellus Gomes (born 16 January 1961) is an Indian field hockey player. He competed at the 1984 Summer Olympics in Los Angeles, where the Indian team placed fifth. Currently he is working in prestigious management institute "Xavier Institute of Management and Research", Mumbai.
