= Mariano Bordas =

Spanish field hockey player (born 1960)

Personal information
- Full name: Mariano Bordas Mon
- Nationality: Spanish
- Born: 14 May 1960 (age 65)

Sport
- Sport: Field hockey

Mariano Bordas Mon (Note: In this Spanish name, the first or paternal surname is Bordas and the second or maternal family name is Mon.) (born 14 May 1960) is a Spanish field hockey player. He competed at the 1984 Summer Olympics in Los Angeles, where the Spanish team placed eighth.
