= Juan Malgosa =

Spanish field hockey player (born 1959)

Personal information
- Nationality: Spanish
- Born: 29 August 1959 (age 66) Barcelona

Sport
- Sport: Field hockey

Juan Malgosa (born 29 August 1959) is a Spanish field hockey player. He was born in Barcelona. He competed at the 1984 Summer Olympics in Los Angeles, where the Spanish team placed eighth. He also competed at the 1988 Summer Olympics in Seoul.
