= George Carnoutsos =

New Zealand field hockey player

George Carnoutsos (born 12 February 1958) is a former field hockey player from New Zealand, who was a member of the national team that finished seventh at the 1984 Summer Olympics in Los Angeles, California. He was born in Christchurch. He currently plays tennis at the Cashmere Tennis Club.
