= Julius Mutinda =

Kenyan field hockey player

Personal information
- Nationality: Kenyan
- Born: 14 September 1956 (age 69)

Sport
- Sport: Field hockey

Julius Mutinda (born 14 September 1956) is a Kenyan field hockey player. He competed at the 1984 Summer Olympics in Los Angeles, where the Kenyan team placed ninth. He also competed at the 1988 Summer Olympics in Seoul.
