= Emmanuel Oduol =

Kenyan field hockey player

Personal information
- Nationality: Kenyan
- Born: 31 January 1962 (age 64)

Sport
- Country: Kenya
- Sport: Field hockey

Emmanuel Oduol (born 31 January 1962) is a Kenyan field hockey player. He competed at the 1984 Summer Olympics in Los Angeles, where the Kenyan team placed ninth.
