= Raphael Fernandes (field hockey) =

Kenyan hockey player

Personal information
- Nationality: Kenyan
- Born: 1 December 1956 (age 69)

Sport
- Sport: Field hockey
- Club: Baobab Hockey Club, Mombasa

Raphael Fernandes (born 1 December 1956) is a Kenyan field hockey player. He competed in the men's tournament at the 1984 Summer Olympics.
