= Arthur Parkin =

Field hockey player (1952–2023)

Personal information
- Born: William Arthur Parkin; 15 February 1952 Whangārei, New Zealand
- Died: 14 November 2023 (aged 71) Auckland, New Zealand
- Height: 1.70 m (5 ft 7 in)
- Weight: 65 kg (143 lb)

Sport
- Country: New Zealand
- Sport: Field hockey

William Arthur Parkin (15 February 1952 – 14 November 2023) was a New Zealand field hockey player. He was a member of the New Zealand national team that won the gold medal at the 1976 Summer Olympics in Montreal. He also participated at the 1972 and 1984 Summer Olympics.

In February 2018, Parkin was found guilty on two charges of sexually assaulting an eleven-year-old girl. He was acquitted of three other charges involving two other complainants. He was sentenced to one year and eight months' imprisonment.

Parkin died in Auckland on 14 November 2023, at the age of 71.
