= Romeo James =

Indian field hockey player (born 1958)

Olympic medal record

Men's Field Hockey

Asian Games
Silver medal – second place	1982 Delhi	Team

Champions Trophy
Bronze medal – third place	1982 Amstelveen	

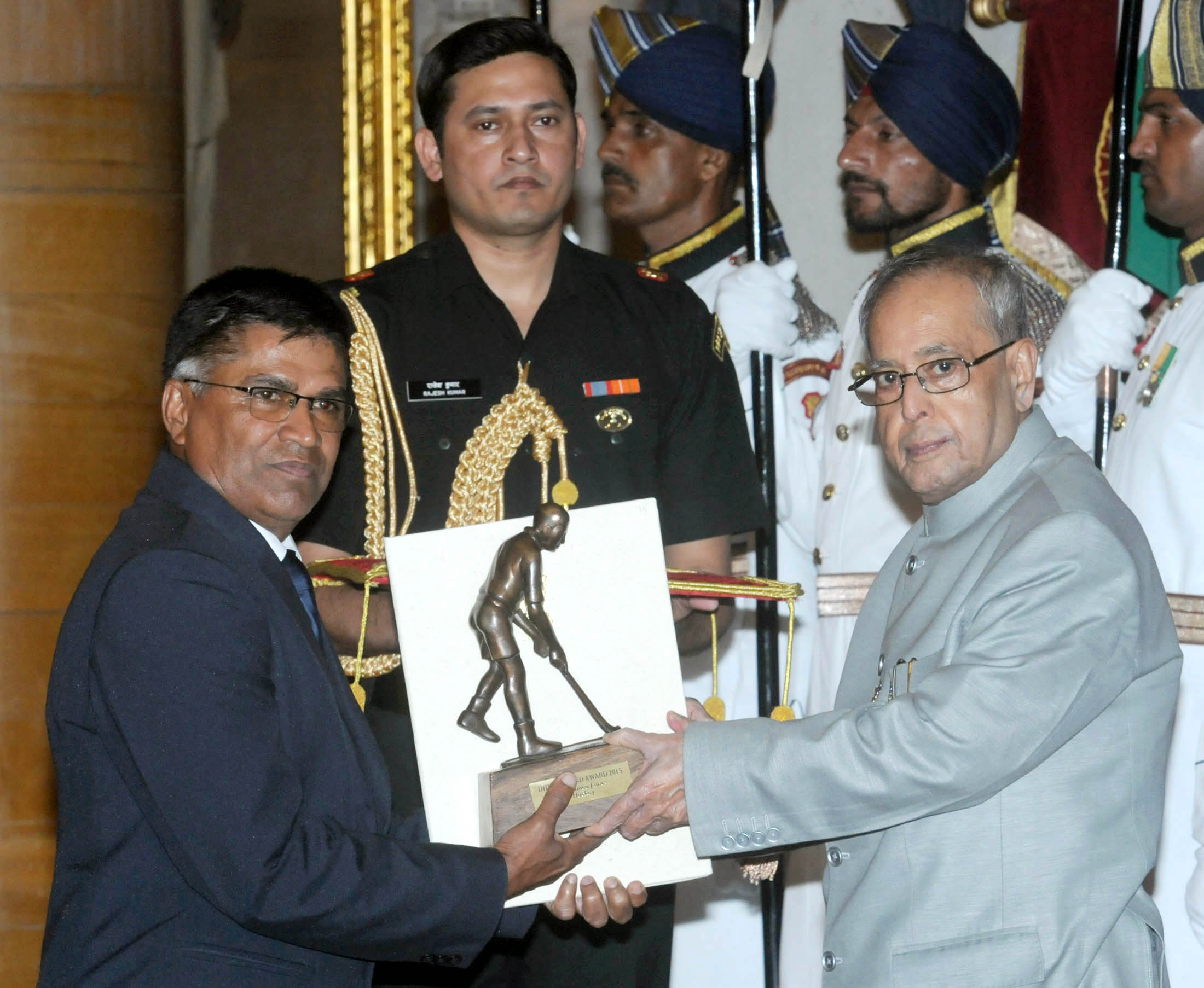
The President, Shri Pranab Mukherjee presenting the Dhyan Chand Award for the year-2015 to Shri Romeo James for Hockey, in a glittering ceremony, at Rashtrapati Bhavan, in New Delhi on August 29, 2015

Romeo James (born 15 September 1958) is an Indian field hockey player. He competed at the 1982 Delhi Asian Games, winning a silver medal with the Indian team. He competed at the 1984 Summer Olympics in Los Angeles, where the Indian team placed fifth. In 2015, he received the Major Dhyan Chand Award for Lifetime Achievement in Sports and Games.

== Career ==
=== As player ===
He competed at the 1982 Delhi Asian Games, winning a silver medal with the Indian team. He competed at the 1984 Summer Olympics in Los Angeles, where the Indian team placed fifth.

Under his captaincy, the Services Team has won the National Hockey Championship in 1982 & 1985.

=== As coach ===
He was the coach of Indian Hockey team at the 2010 Men's FIH Hockey World Cup. He was the coach when Indian team won the silver medal at the 1994 Asian Games and Indira Gandhi International Gold Cup in 1994.
