= Manohar Topno =

Indian field hockey player

Personal information
- Nationality: Indian
- Born: 25 June 1958 (age 68)

Sport
- Sport: Field hockey
Medal record
Representing India
Men's field hockey
Asian Games
Silver medal – second place	1982 Delhi	Team
Champions Trophy
Bronze medal – third place	1982 Amstelveen

Manohar Topno (born 25 June 1958) is an Indian field hockey player. He competed at the 1984 Summer Olympics in Los Angeles, where the Indian team placed fifth.
