= Jalal-ud-Din Syed Rizvi =

Indian hockey player

Personal information
- Nationality: Indian
- Born: 10 January 1958 (age 68)

Sport
- Sport: Field hockey

Jalal-ud-Din Syed Rizvi (born 10 January 1958) is an Indian field hockey player. He competed in the men's tournament at the 1984 Summer Olympics.
