= Peter Miskimmin =

New Zealand field hockey player

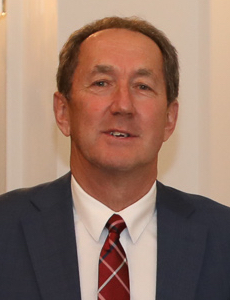
Miskimmin in 2021

Peter Anthony Miskimmin QSO (born 20 November 1958 in Christchurch) is a former field hockey player from New Zealand, who was a member of the national team that finished seventh at the 1984 Summer Olympics in Los Angeles, United States. His two-year older brother Brent was also on the side, that competed in 1984. He also participated in the 1992 Summer Olympics in Barcelona, where the Kiwis claimed eighth place. Later on Miskimmin became president of the Olympian Club New Zealand.

Miskimmin was appointed Chief Executive of Sport and Recreation New Zealand (SPARC) in April 2008.

In the 2021 Queen's Birthday Honours, Miskimmin was appointed a Companion of the Queen's Service Order, for services to sports governance and public service.
