= Jaime Escudé =

Spanish field hockey player (born 1962)

Personal information
- Full name: Jaime Escudé Torrente
- Born: 14 April 1962 (age 63); Barcelona, Spain

Jaime Escudé Torrente (Note: In this Spanish name, the first or paternal surname is Escudé and the second or maternal family name is Torrente.) (born 14 April 1962) is a Spanish field hockey player. He competed in the men's tournament at the 1988 Summer Olympics.
