= Peter Daji =

New Zealand field hockey player

Peter Parkas Daji (born 18 July 1960) is a former field hockey player from New Zealand, who was a member of the national team that finished seventh at the 1984 Summer Olympics in Los Angeles, California. Eight years later Daji ended up in eight position at the 1992 Summer Olympics in Barcelona with The Black Sticks. He was born in Auckland.
