= Jitender Singh Panesar =

Kenyan hockey player

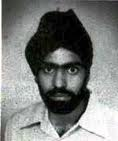

Personal information
- Nationality: Kenyan
- Born: 12 February 1958 (age 68) Nairobi, British Kenya

Sport
- Sport: Field hockey
- Club: Simba Union, Nairobi

Jitender Singh Panesar (born 12 February 1958) is a Kenyan field hockey player. He competed in the men's tournament at the 1984 Summer Olympics.

His brother Manjeet for the national hockey team.
