= Craig Davies (field hockey) =

Australian field hockey player

Personal information
- Born: 26 May 1957 (age 68) Perth, Western Australia

Sport
- Sport: Field hockey

Craig Davies (born 26 May 1957) is an Australian field hockey player. He competed at the 1984 Summer Olympics in Los Angeles, where the Australian team placed fourth. He also participated at the 1988 Summer Olympics in Seoul, where the Australian team again placed fourth.
