= Manjeet Singh Panesar =

Kenyan field hockey player

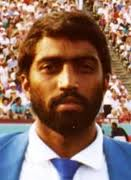

Personal information
- Nationality: Kenyan
- Born: 21 February 1962 (age 64) Nairobi, British Kenya

Sport
- Sport: Field hockey
- Club: Simba Union, Nairobi

Manjeet Singh Panesar (born 21 February 1962) is a Kenyan field hockey player. He competed in the men's tournament at the 1984 Summer Olympics.

His brother Jitender for the national hockey team.
