= Harvinder Singh Kular =

Kenyan field hockey player

Personal information
- Nationality: Kenyan
- Born: 28 March 1958 (age 68) Nairobi, British Kenya

Sport
- Sport: Field hockey
- Club: Railway Gymkhana, Nairobi

Harvinder Singh Kular (born 28 March 1958) is a Kenyan field hockey player. He competed in the men's tournament at the 1984 Summer Olympics.
