= Krzysztof Michalak =

Polish footballer (born 1987)

Personal information
- Date of birth: 15 April 1987 (age 39)
- Place of birth: Bełchatów, Poland
- Height: 1.76 m (5 ft 9 in)
- Position: Midfielder

Team information
- Current team: Włókniarz Zelów
- Number: 7

Senior career*
| Years | Team | Apps | (Gls) |
| 2005–2009 | GKS Bełchatów | 3 | (0) |
| 2009–2011 | Włókniarz Zelów | | |
| 2011–2013 | Polonia Bytom | 46 | (5) |
| 2013–2014 | GKS Bełchatów | 8 | (0) |
| 2014–2016 | Polonia Bytom | 54 | (0) |
| 2016 | Legionovia Legionowo | 9 | (0) |
| 2016–2017 | GKS Bełchatów | 12 | (0) |
| 2017–2019 | RKS Radomsko | 42 | (2) |
| 2019–2024 | Omega Kleszczów | 147 | (6) |
| 2024– | Włókniarz Zelów | 12 | (0) |
- * Club domestic league appearances and goals as of 7 January 2025

Krzysztof Michalak (born 15 April 1987) is a Polish footballer who plays a midfielder for Omega Kleszczów.

== Club career ==
Michalak made his debut in II liga with GKS Bełchatów as an 82nd-minute substitute against Szczakowianka Jaworzno on 8 June 2005.

== Honours ==
GKS Bełchatów

- I liga: 2013–14

Polonia Bytom

- III liga Opole–Silesia: 2014–15
- Polish Cup (Silesia regionals): 2014–15
