= Jan Albers =

Dutch field hockey player

Jan Albers (born 27 March 1952 in Veldhoven) is a former Dutch field hockey player, who played for the Dutch Men's National Field Hockey Squad, EMHC, HC Tilburg and HC Klein Zwitserland.

When Albers reached the age of 17 he went to play for EMHC in Eindhoven, where he played for five years in the first team and formed a very successful combination with famous hockey player Paul Esmeyer (who later married Git Weijtens, one of the best hockey players the game has ever had). Whilst playing for EMHC, Albers was invited to play for the national Dutch field hockey team under 21 years of age, under the nickname 'Jantje Basko'.

After that he played for a period of two years for HC Tilburg and was selected for the Dutch National Team. In 1976 Albers went to the 1976 Summer Olympics in Montreal, where the Dutch team finished fourth. After having moved to Amsterdam, he played for a period of three years for HC Klein Zwitserland. During this period, HCKZ dominated Dutch Field Hockey with players such as Hans Kruize, Ties Kruize, Ron Steens and Tim Steens.

Since October 2006 Jan Albers has been chairman of the Dutch National Field Hockey organization the 'KNHB'.
