= 1985 Men's Hockey Champions Trophy =

International field hockey tournament

Tournament details
- Host country: Australia
- City: Perth
- Dates: 16–24 November
- Teams: 6

Final positions
- Champions: Australia (3rd title)
- Runner-up: Great Britain
- Third place: West Germany

Tournament statistics
- Matches played: 15
- Goals scored: 62 (4.13 per match)
- Top scorer: (West Germany) Carsten Fischer (9 goals)

The 1985 Men's Hockey Champions Trophy was the seventh edition of the Hockey Champions Trophy, an international men's field hockey tournament. It took place from 16 to 24 November 1985 in Perth, Western Australia.

The hosts Australia won their third title in a row by finishing first in the round-robin tournament.

== Results ==
Team	Pld	W	D	L	GF	GA	GD	Pts
Australia	5	4	0	1	12	8	+4	8
Great Britain	5	2	2	1	8	6	+2	6
West Germany	5	1	3	1	13	12	+1	5
Pakistan	5	2	1	2	10	10	0	5
Netherlands	5	1	1	3	10	11	−1	3
India	5	1	1	3	9	15	−6	3

16 November 1985
10:30

Pakistan	1–2	India
Sardar 3'	Report	Shahid 4'; MP. Singh 10'

Umpires:
Graham Nash (ENG)
S Smith (AUS)

16 November 1985
12:30

West Germany	1–1	Great Britain
Fischer 32'	Report	Bhaura 33'

Umpires:
Rob Lathouwers (NED)
Obaidullah (IND)

16 November 1985
15:00

Australia	2–1	Netherlands
Haselhurst 30', 63'	Report	Schaeffers 48'

Umpires:
Santiago Deo (ESP)
Shafat Baghdadi (PAK)

17 November 1985
13:00

West Germany	3–1	Pakistan
Fischer 20', 49', 50'	Report	Feroz 47'

Umpires:

17 November 1985
15:00

India	1–4	Australia
Shahid 10'	Report	Haselhurst 7', 9'; Batch 52'; Hager 69'

Umpires:

18 November 1985
12:30

Netherlands	0–2	Great Britain
	Report	Batchelor 19'; Duthie 40'

Umpires:
Santiago Deo (ESP)
Obaidullah (IND)

19 November 1985
12:30

India	5–5	West Germany
Rizvi 36'; MP. Singh 62'; Shahid 65'; P. Singh 68'; Carvalho 70'	Report	Fischer 33', 42', 51'; Blöcher 38', 45'

Umpires:
Rob Lathouwers (NED)
Don Prior (AUS)

19 November 1985
14:30

Netherlands	3–4	Pakistan
T. Kruize 27', 57'; Parlevliet 60'	Report	Q. Khan 24', 51'; F. Khan 45'; Feroz 68'

Umpires:
Graham Nash (ENG)
Claude Seidler (GER)

21 November 1985
12:30

Australia	3–2	Great Britain
Mitton 23', 60'; Hager 62'	Report	Leman 19'; Potter 70'

Umpires:
Alain Renaud (FRA)
Shafat Baghdadi (PAK)

21 November 1985
14:30

Netherlands	3–0	India
Heijn 12'; H. Kruize 16', 51'	Report

Umpires:
Graham Nash (ENG)
S Smith (AUS)

22 November 1985
12:30

Australia	2–1	West Germany
Mitton 32'; Batch 40'	Report	Blöcher 31'

Umpires:
Louismichel Gillet (FRA)
Santiago Deo (ESP)

23 November 1985
13:30

Great Britain	1–1	Pakistan
Potter 6'	Report	Sardar 37'

Umpires:
Claude Seidler (GER)
Rob Lathouwers (NED)

23 November 1985
15:30

West Germany	3–3	Netherlands
Fischer 5', 56'; Keller 23'	Report	T. Kruize 8', 18', 63'

Umpires:
Louismichel Gillet (FRA)
S Smith (AUS)

24 November 1985
11:30

Great Britain	2–1	India
Duthie 53'; Barber 68'	Report	Carvalho 35'

Umpires:
Rob Lathouwers (NED)
Don Prior (AUS)

24 November 1985
13:30

Pakistan	3–1	Australia
Feroz 5'; Sardar 16'; Q. Khan 39'	Report	Charlesworth 41'

Umpires:
Santiago Deo (ESP)
Alain Renaud (FRA)

== Statistics ==
=== Final standings ===
1. Australia
2. Great Britain
3. West Germany
4. Pakistan
5. Netherlands
6. India

=== Goalscorers ===
There were 62 goals scored in 15 matches, for an average of 4.13 goals per match.

9 goals

- (West Germany) Carsten Fischer

5 goals

- (Netherlands) Ties Kruize

4 goals

- (Australia) Peter Haselhurst

3 goals

- (Australia) Grant Mitton
- (India) Mohamed Shahid
- (Pakistan) Qasim Khan
- (Pakistan) Hasan Sardar
- (Pakistan) Wasim Feroz
- (West Germany) Stefan Blocher

2 goals

- (Australia) Colin Batch
- (Australia) Mark Hager
- (United Kingdom) James Duthie
- (United Kingdom) Jon Potter
- (India) J.M. Carvalho
- (India) Mohinderpal Singh
- (Netherlands) Hans Kruize

1 goal

- (Australia) Ric Charlesworth
- (United Kingdom) Paul Barber
- (United Kingdom) Stephen Batchelor
- (United Kingdom) Kulbir Bhaura
- (United Kingdom) Richard Leman
- (India) Pargat Singh
- (India) Jalaludin Rizvi
- (Netherlands) Ronald Jan Heijn
- (Netherlands) Erik Parlevliet
- (Netherlands) Marc Schaeffers
- (Pakistan) Farhat Khan
- (West Germany) Andreas Keller

Source: FIH
