= Gerrit Kruize =

American field hockey player

André Bolhuis
Personal information
- Born: May 2, 1923 Apeldoorn, the Netherlands
- Died: May 11, 2009 (aged 86) Cary, North Carolina, United States
- Height: 1.97 m (6 ft 6 in)
- Weight: 93 kg (205 lb)

Sport
- Sport: Field hockey
- Club: Westchester Field Hockey Club

Gerrit Kruize (May 2, 1923 – May 11, 2009) was an American field hockey player who competed at the 1956 Summer Olympics. He was born in the Netherlands but immigrated to the United States and became a US citizen on June 23, 1955, in White Plains, NY. His brother Roepie and nephews Hans, Hidde and Ties were Dutch Olympic field hockey players.
