= Borstlap =

Borstlap is a Dutch surname. Notable people with the surname include:

- John Borstlap (born 1950), Dutch composer and author
- Michiel Borstlap (born 1966), Dutch pianist and composer
- Tjeerd Borstlap (born 1955), Dutch field hockey player
