= Tjeerd =

Tjeerd is a masculine given name of West Frisian origin that is common in the Netherlands. Like Tjaard, the name is derived from Germanic Thiadward ("strong among/protector of the people"). Notable people with the name include:

- Tjeerd van Albada (born 1936), Dutch astronomer
- Tjeerd van Andel (1923–2010), Dutch-born American geologist and oceanographer
- Tjeerd Boersma (1915–1985), Dutch sprinter
- Tjeerd Borstlap (born 1955), Dutch field hockey player
- Tjeerd Bottema (1884–1978), Dutch painter, illustrator and book cover designer
- Tjeerd van Dekken (born 1967), Dutch Labour Party politician
- Tjeerd Korf (born 1983), Dutch footballer
- Tjeerd Oosterhuis (born 1971), Dutch musician, songwriter and producer
- Tjeerd Pasma (1904–1944), Dutch modern pentathlete
- Tjeerd Daniel van Scheltinga (1914–1994), Dutch chess master

== See also ==
- Asteroid 10435 Tjeerd, named after Tjeerd van Albada
