= HC Klein Zwitserland =

Dutch field hockey club

Coordinates: 52°06′20″N 4°18′36″E

Klein Zwitserland
- Full name: Hockey Club Klein Zwitserland
- Nickname(s): De Steenbokken (The Capricorns)
- Short name: KZ
- League: Men's Hoofdklasse; Women's Hoofdklasse
- Founded: 20 September 1908; 117 years ago
- Home ground: Sportpark Klein Zwitserland, The Hague
- Website: Club website
Home	Away

Hockey Club Klein Zwitserland, commonly known as Klein Zwitserland, is a Dutch professional field hockey club based in The Hague, South Holland.

The women and men's first teams compete in the hoofdklasse, the highest league of Dutch field hockey.

Founded on 20 September 1908, the club was incredibly successful during the 1970s, winning 8 national titles in a row. The first men's team played continuously on the highest level of Dutch hockey from 1974 until 2007. After promoting twice in a row they have been back in the hoofdklasse since 2018.

== Honours ==
=== Men ===
Hoofdklasse

- Winners (8): 1976–77, 1977–78, 1978–79, 1979–80, 1980–81, 1981–82, 1982–83, 1983–84
- Runners-up (2): 1974–75, 1975–76 :

Gold Cup

- Winners (1): 2021–22

EuroHockey Club Champions Cup:

- Winners (2): 1979, 1981
- Runners-up (4): 1980, 1982, 1983, 1985

Hoofdklasse Indoor

- Winners (2): 1974–75, 1982–83

== Players ==
=== Current squad ===
==== Men's squad ====
As of 13 September 2024

No.	Pos.	Nation	Player
1	GK	NED	Koene Schaper (Captain)
6	MF	NED	Lucas Middendorp
7	FW	NED	Nick van Trigt
8		NED	Daan Smits
9		NED	Lars Daniels
10	FW	NED	Willem van Campen
11		NED	Jonas Ellerman
12	MF	NED	Ties Klinkhamer
13	DF	RSA	Chad Futcher
14	DF	USA	Aki Käppeler
15	DF	NED	Douwe Steens

No.	Pos.	Nation	Player
18	FW	ARG	Lucas Toscani
19	DF	NED	Pepijn Jones
20	FW	NED	Maurik Smits
21		NED	Elout Kielman
22	FW	GER	Marco Miltkau (Captain)
23	FW	ARG	Nicolás Keenan
24	DF	AUS	Matthew Swann
25	GK	NED	Lars Zijderveld
27	FW	ESP	Albert Béltran
28		CZE	Štěpán Klaban
35	MF	GER	Adrian Lehmann-Richter

==== Women's squad ====
Head coach: Razwan Mehmood Ahmed

As of 2022

No.	Pos.	Nation	Player
2	DF	NZL	Kaitlin Cotter
3	MF	JPN	Moeka Tsubouchi
4		NED	Sabine van Silfhout
5		NED	Maud de Kok
6		NED	Sietske Brüning
7		NED	Meike Tjaberinga
8	FW	AUS	Lexie Pickering
9	MF	RSA	Kristen Paton
10		NED	Philine Vinkesteijn
11	DF	AUS	Kaitlin Nobbs

No.	Pos.	Nation	Player
12		NED	Bibi Donraadt
13		NED	Bernice van Aken
15	MF	USA	Fusine Govaert
16		NED	Nanne Eijkman
18	FW	AUS	Alice Arnott
19		NED	Pepita Rademakers
20		NED	Kirsen Ender
21		NED	Fleur Hofman
25	FW	JPN	Kaho Tanaka
33		NED	Anne-Louise Nijdam

=== Notable players ===
==== Men's internationals ====
Netherlands

- Jan Albers
- Tjeerd Borstlap
- Edo Buma
- Jaap-Derk Buma
- Maurits Crucq
- Geert-Jan Derikx
- Laurence Docherty
- Sander Dreesmann
- Thijs de Greeff
- Maarten van Grimbergen
- Egbert Ho
- Hans Kruize
- Hidde Kruize
- Roepie Kruize
- Ties Kruize
- Ron Steens
- Tim Steens
- Taeke Taekema
- Rochus Westbroek

England/Great Britain

- Brett Garrard

Argentina

- Maximiliano Caldas
- Nicolas Keenan

Australia

- Grant Schubert

India

- Gagan Ajit Singh
- Dilip Tirkey

United States

- Steven van Randwijck

==== Women's internationals ====
Netherlands

- Naomi van As
- Merel de Blaeij
- Eveline de Haan
- Femke Kooijman
- Leonoor Voskamp

Australia

- Alyson Annan

England/Great Britain

- Alex Danson
