= History of the Netherlands (1900–present) =

Modern history of the Netherlands
- 1900–present
History of the Netherlands (1840-1900)
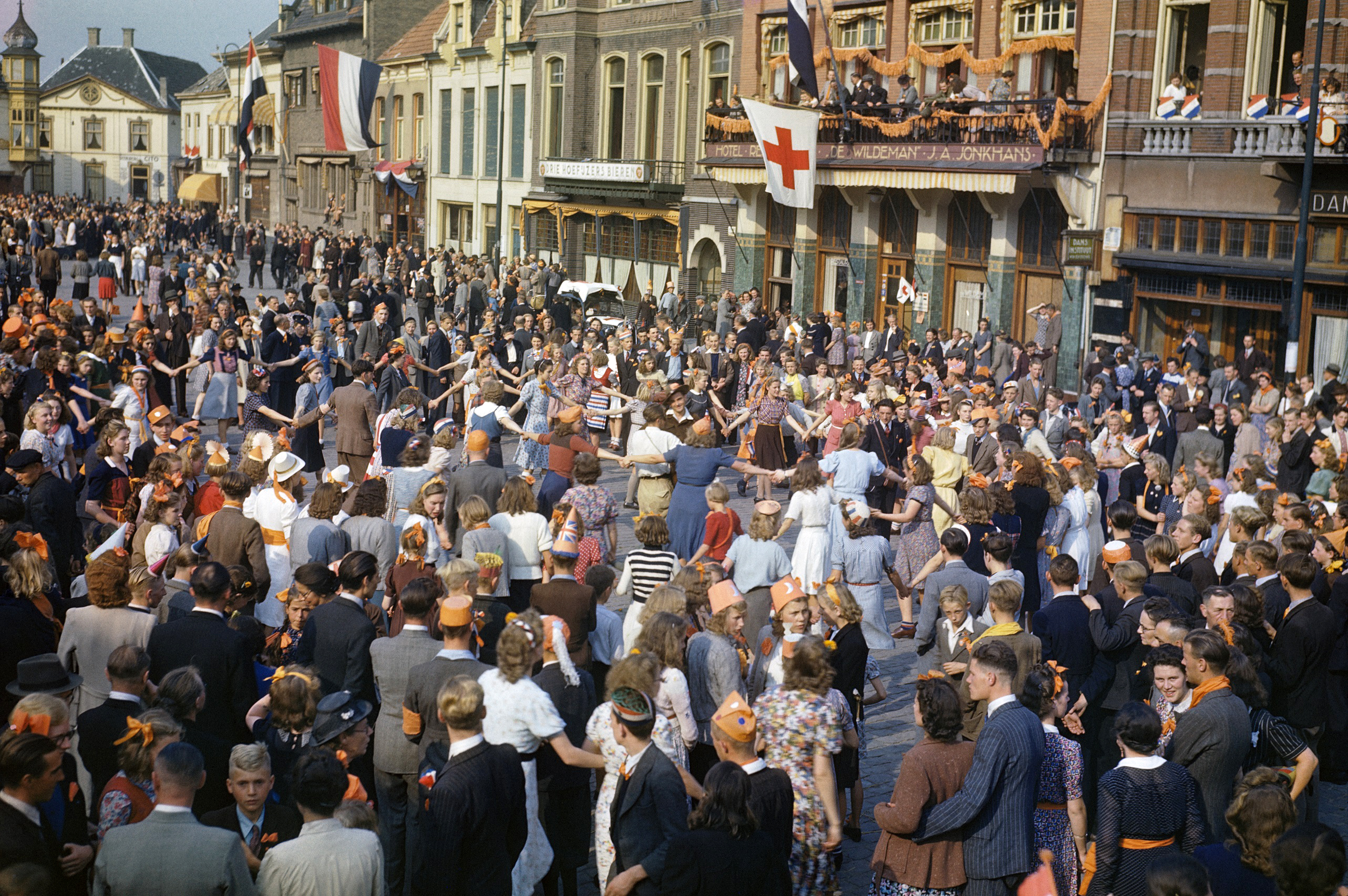
- The liberation of Eindhoven, 1944
- Location: Kingdom of the Netherlands
- Including: Netherlands in World War I de Crisisjaren; Netherlands in World War II; Decolonizaton
- Monarch(s): Wilhelmina; Juliana; Beatrix; Willem-Alexander
- Key events: Aceh War; Proclamation of Indonesian Independence; Depillarisation; Treaty of Paris (1951); Treaty of Rome; Charter for the Kingdom of the Netherlands

From 1900 to 1940, the Netherlands experienced significant population growth. This era included significant colonial expansion, particularly in the Dutch East Indies, coupled with the challenges posed by World War I and the Great Depression. Although the Netherlands maintained neutrality during World War I, its strategic geographic location and colonial resources had profound implications for its economic and political stability. The period saw the rise of socialism and labor unrest, which were partly driven by industrialization and the shifting dynamics of Dutch society.

World War II marked a devastating period for the Netherlands, which suffered under German occupation from 1940 until liberation in 1945. The war's impact was severe, with the Rotterdam Blitz causing extensive destruction and loss of life. Dutch resistance was significant, though the nation also faced collaboration from within. Post-war, the Netherlands underwent a painful process of recovery and retribution against collaborators. The immediate post-war years were focused on rebuilding and economic stabilization, facilitated by U.S. aid through the Marshall Plan, which helped to revive the Dutch economy and infrastructure.

The post-war period saw significant changes in the Dutch empire, with Indonesia proclaiming independence in 1945, leading to a violent and tumultuous decolonization process completed in 1949. This era brought about substantial social change within the Netherlands, including the establishment of a welfare state in the subsequent decades. Economic prosperity in the 1960s and 1970s led to social liberalization, culminating in progressive policies on immigration, drugs, and euthanasia. The Netherlands also became a founding member of key international institutions, including the European Union, reflecting its deepening commitment to international cooperation.

In recent decades, the Netherlands has continued to play a significant role in global affairs, maintaining a strong economy and a high standard of living. Challenges such as immigration and integration have sparked considerable debate, particularly in the context of rising global tensions and the impact of globalization. Dutch society today remains at the forefront of advocating for liberal social policies, environmental sustainability, and international peace, upholding its long tradition of political and social innovation.

== 1900 to 1940 ==
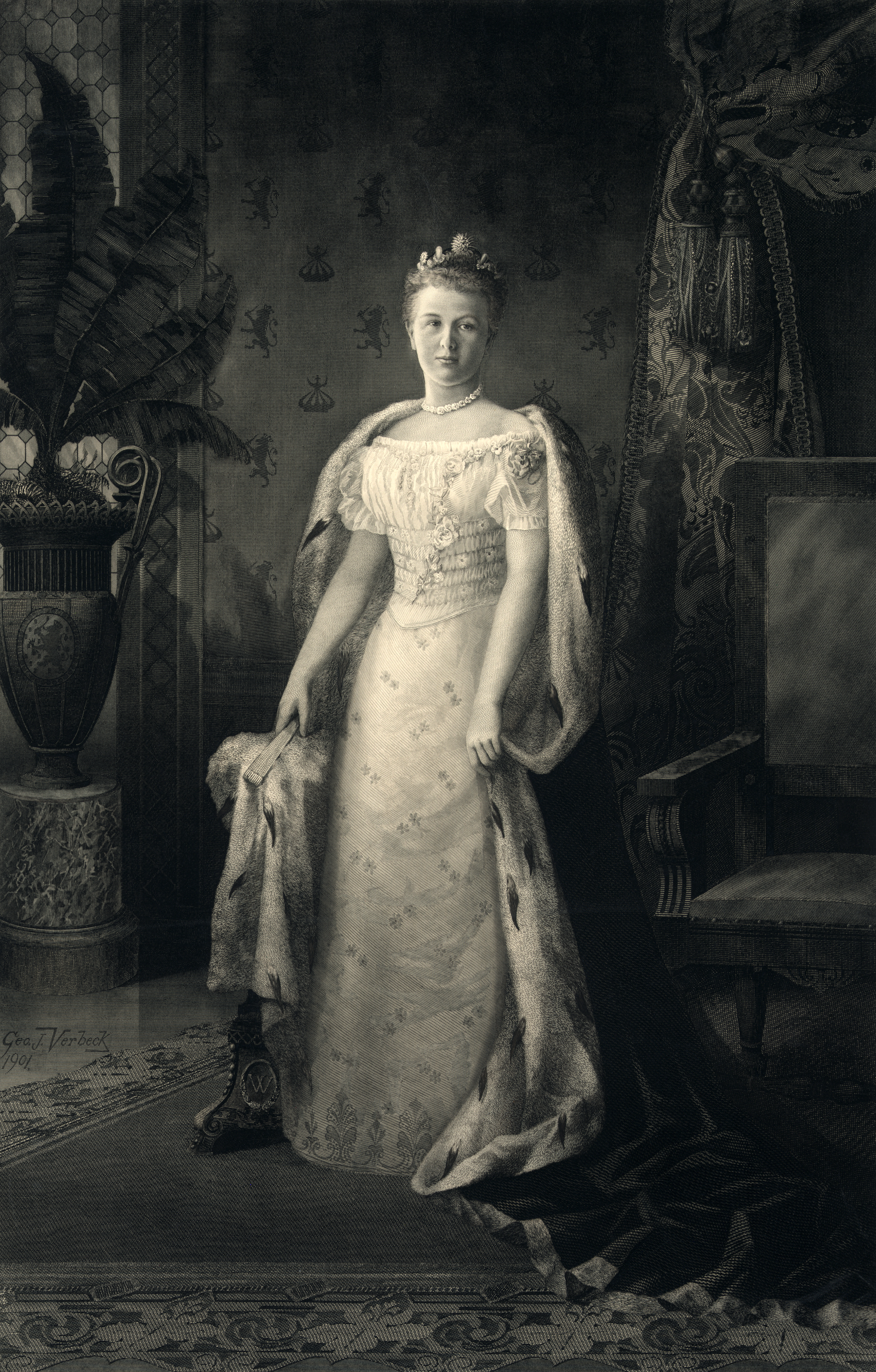
Queen Wilhelmina, queen of the Netherlands from 1890 to 1948

In 1890, William III died after a long reign and was succeeded by his young daughter, Queen Wilhelmina (1880–1962). She would rule the Netherlands for 58 years. On her accession to the throne, the personal union between the Netherlands and Luxembourg ended because Luxembourg law excluded women from rule. Her remote cousin Adolphe became the Grand Duke of Luxembourg.

This was a time of further growth and colonial development, but it was marked by the difficulties of World War I (in which the Netherlands was neutral) and the Great Depression. The Dutch population grew rapidly in the 20th century, as death rates fell, more lands were opened up, and industrialisation created urban jobs. Between 1900 and 1950 the population doubled from 5.1 to 10 million people.

=== Emergence of socialist parties ===
At the beginning of the 20th century, socialism began to develop in the industrial centers. Although the first socialist party, the Social Democratic League, was founded in the 19th century, the electoral system, combined with a policy of containment and repression, prevented the development of the socialist movement. In the 1901 election, the Social Democratic Workers' Party increased its representation from two to six seats in the lower house of parliament, to the great unease of the confessional and liberal elite. This unease became even greater during the railway strike of 1903, which disrupted the functioning of Dutch society. The railway strike was followed by a general strike in protest at the harsh treatment of the railway workers by the confessional government. In contrast to Germany, the majority of Dutch socialists did not complain about imperialism and the East Indies.

After the 1913 elections, in which the social democrats doubled their number of seats (from 7 to 15), the Liberal Union tried to form a coalition government with the social democrats but the social democrats refused to cooperate with what they perceived as bourgeois (or "middle class") parties.

=== Colonial focus ===
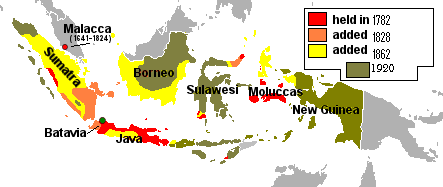
Map of the Dutch East Indies showing its expansion from 1800 to 1942

The Dutch empire comprised the Dutch East Indies (Indonesia), as well as Suriname in South America and some minor possessions. The empire was run from Batavia (in Java), where the governor and his technical experts had almost complete authority with little oversight from The Hague. Successive governors improved their bureaucratic and military controls, and allowed very little voice to the locals until the 1920s.

The colony brought economic opportunity to the mother country and there was little concern at the time about it. One exception came in 1860 when Eduard Dekker, under the pen name "Multatuli" wrote the novel Max Havelaar: Or the Coffee Auctions of the Dutch Trading Company, one of the most notable books in the history of Dutch literature. He criticized the exploitation of the colony and as well had harsh words about the indigenous princes who collaborated with the governor. The book helped inspire the Indonesian independence movement in the mid-20th century as well as the "Fair trade" movement for coffee at the end of the century.

The military forces in the Dutch East Indies were controlled by the governor and were not part of the regular Dutch army. As the map shows, the Dutch slowly expanded their holdings from their base in Java to include all of modern Indonesia by 1920. Most islands were not a problem. The Aceh war (1873–1913) was a long, costly campaign against the Achin (Aceh) state in northern Sumatra.

=== Neutrality during the First World War ===
The Netherlands had not fought a major military campaign since the 1760s, and so the strength of its armed forces had gradually dwindled. The Dutch decided not to ally themselves with anyone, and remained neutral in all European wars, especially the First World War.

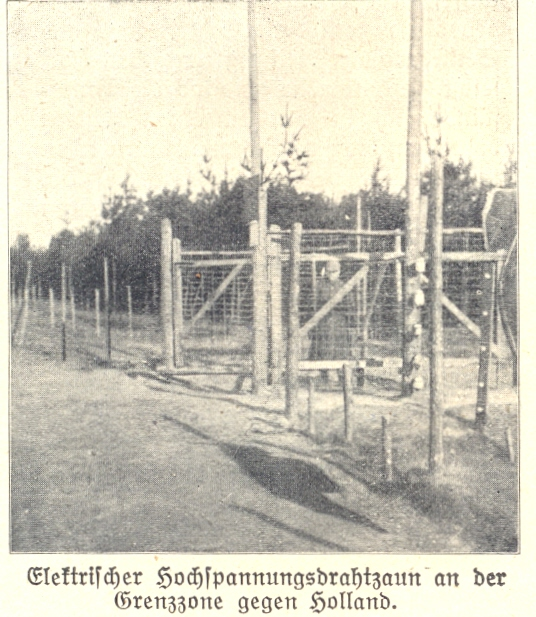
Electrified fence along the border between the Netherlands and Belgium during the First World War 1914–1918.

The German war plan (the Schlieffen Plan) of 1905 was modified in 1908 to invade Belgium on the way to Paris but not the Netherlands. It supplied many essential raw materials to Germany such as rubber, tin, quinine, oil and food. The British used its blockade to limit supplies that the Dutch could pass on. There were other factors that made it expedient for both the Allies and the Central Powers for the Netherlands to remain neutral. The Netherlands controlled the mouths of the Scheldt, the Rhine and the Meuse rivers. Germany had an interest in the Rhine since it ran through the industrial areas of the Ruhr and connected it with the Dutch port of Rotterdam. Britain had an interest in the Scheldt and the Meuse flowed from France. All countries had an interest in keeping the others out of the Netherlands so that no one's interests could be taken away or be changed. If one country were to have invaded the Netherlands, another would certainly have counterattacked to defend their own interest in the rivers. It was too big a risk for any of the belligerent nations and none wanted to risk fighting on another front.

The Dutch were affected by the war, troops were mobilized and conscription was introduced in the face of harsh criticism from opposition parties. The German invasion of Belgium led to a large flow of refugees from that country (about 1 million). The German Imperial Army however did march through a small part of Dutch territory during the invasion of Belgium, effectively 'taking a shortcut'. The government accepted this to maintain the neutrality of the Netherlands.

Food shortages were extensive, due to the control the belligerents exercised over the Dutch. Each wanted their share of Dutch produce. The country was surrounded by states at war, and with the North Sea unsafe for civilian ships to sail on, food became scarce; food was now distributed using coupons. An error in food distribution caused the so-called 1917 Potato riots in Amsterdam, when civilians plundered a food transport intended for soldiers. As a result, the price of potatoes rose sharply because Britain had demanded so much from the Dutch. In 1918, mutinies broke out in the Dutch military. Food riots broke out in the country. A big problem was smuggling. When Germany had conquered Belgium, the Allies saw it as enemy territory and stopped exporting to Belgium. Food became scarce for the Belgian people, since the Germans seized all food. This gave the Dutch the opportunity to start to smuggle. This, however, caused great problems in the Netherlands, including inflation and further food shortages. The Allies demanded that the Dutch stop the smuggling, and the government took measures to remain neutral. The government placed many cities under 'state of siege'. On 8 January 1916, a 5-kilometre (3.1 mi) zone was created by the government along the border. In that zone, goods could be moved on main roads only with a permit. German authorities in Belgium had an electrified fence erected all along the Belgian–Dutch border that caused many refugees from Belgium to lose their lives. The fence was guarded by older German Landsturm soldiers.

=== Interwar period ===
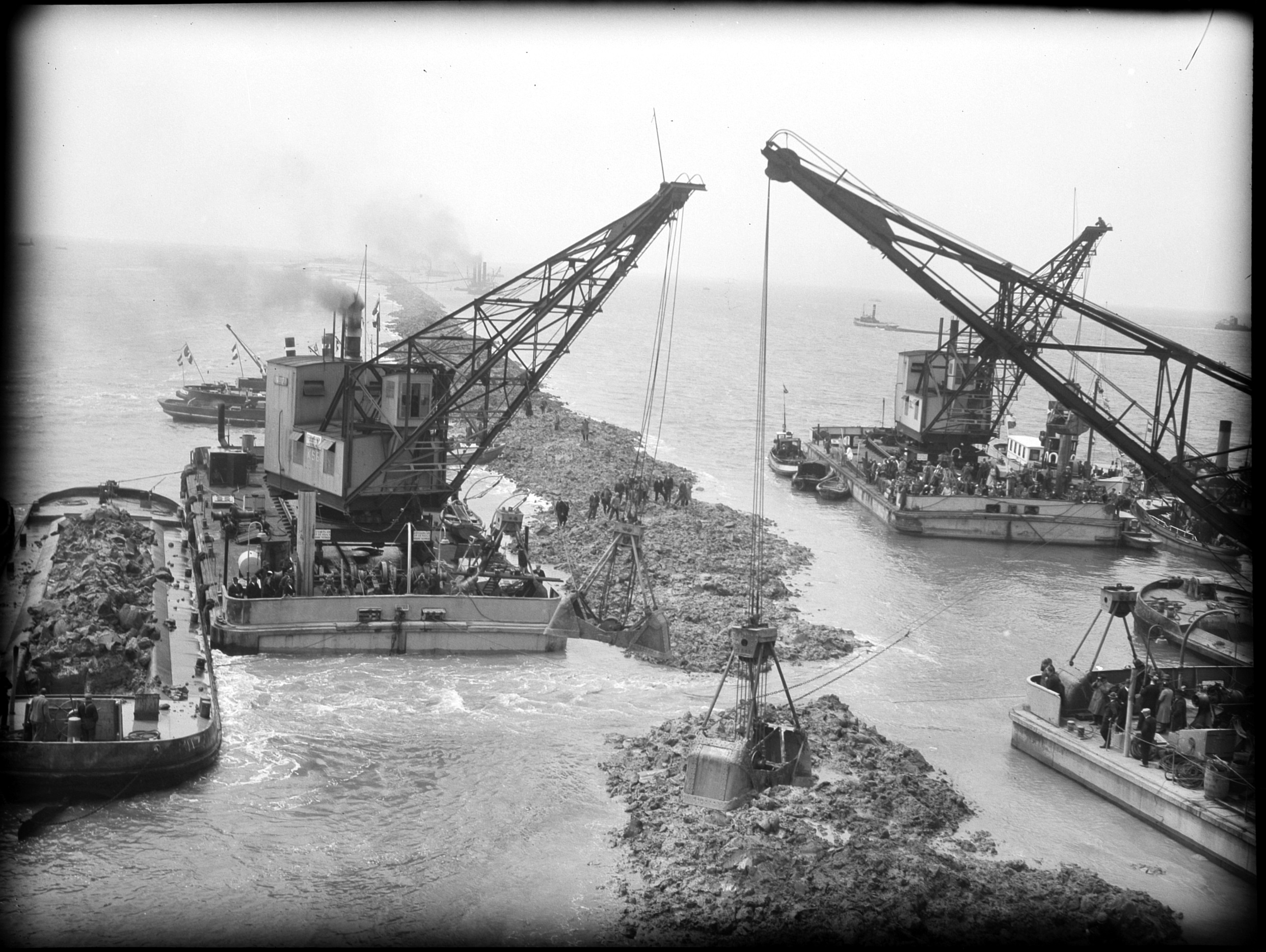
The Afsluitdijk, the dike closing off the Zuiderzee, was constructed between 1927 and 1933. Public works projects like this were one way to deal with high unemployment during the Great Depression.

Dutch society became divided among three large ideologies, Protestantism, Roman Catholicism and Socialism, who tried to protect their populations with a system called verzuiling or Pillarization. The small minority of Liberals, though insisting that their "general" organizations were open to all, effectively consisting of a fourth pillar that held power through financial, rather than social, strength. Although both houses of the Dutch Parliament were elected by the people, only men with high incomes were eligible to vote until 1917, when pressure from socialist movements resulted in elections in which all men regardless of income, were entitled to vote. In 1919, women also obtained the right to vote for the first time in history.

The worldwide Great Depression which began after the tumultuous events of Black Tuesday in 1929, that continued into the early-1930s had crippling effects on the Dutch economy; lasting longer than in most other European countries. The long duration of the Great Depression in the Netherlands is often explained by the very strict fiscal policy of the Dutch government at the time, and its decision to adhere to the gold standard for much longer than most of its trading partners. The Great Depression led to high unemployment and widespread poverty, as well as increasing social unrest. Riots in a working-class neighbourhood in Amsterdam were put down with army assistance, with fatal consequences.

The rise of Nazism in Germany did not go unnoticed in the Netherlands, and there was growing concern at the possibility of armed conflict. However, some say the threat of Nazi aggression was not fully acknowledged by the government of the time. An oft mentioned example is a particular statement by prime minister Hendrik Colijn at the end of his radio speech on the occupation of the Rhineland. He stressed that citizens could sleep safely, because there was no reason for concern.

There were separate fascist and Nazi movements in the 1930s. Dutch Fascists admired Mussolini's Italy and called for a traditional corporate ideology. The membership was small, elitist and ineffective. The pro-Nazi movement, however, won support from Berlin and attempted to build a mass base by 1935. It failed because most Dutch rejected its racial ideology and calls for violence.

The defence budget was not increased until Germany remilitarised the Rhineland in 1936. The budget was further increased in 1938 (after the annexation of Austria and occupation of the Czech Sudetenland). The colonial government also increased its military budget because of increasing tensions with Japan. The Dutch did not mobilise their armed forces until shortly before France and the UK declared war on Germany in September 1939 after the invasion of Poland. Neutrality was still the official policy, but the Dutch government tried to buy new arms for their badly equipped forces; however, a considerable share of ordered weapons never arrived.

== The Second World War (1939–1945) ==
=== German invasion and occupation ===
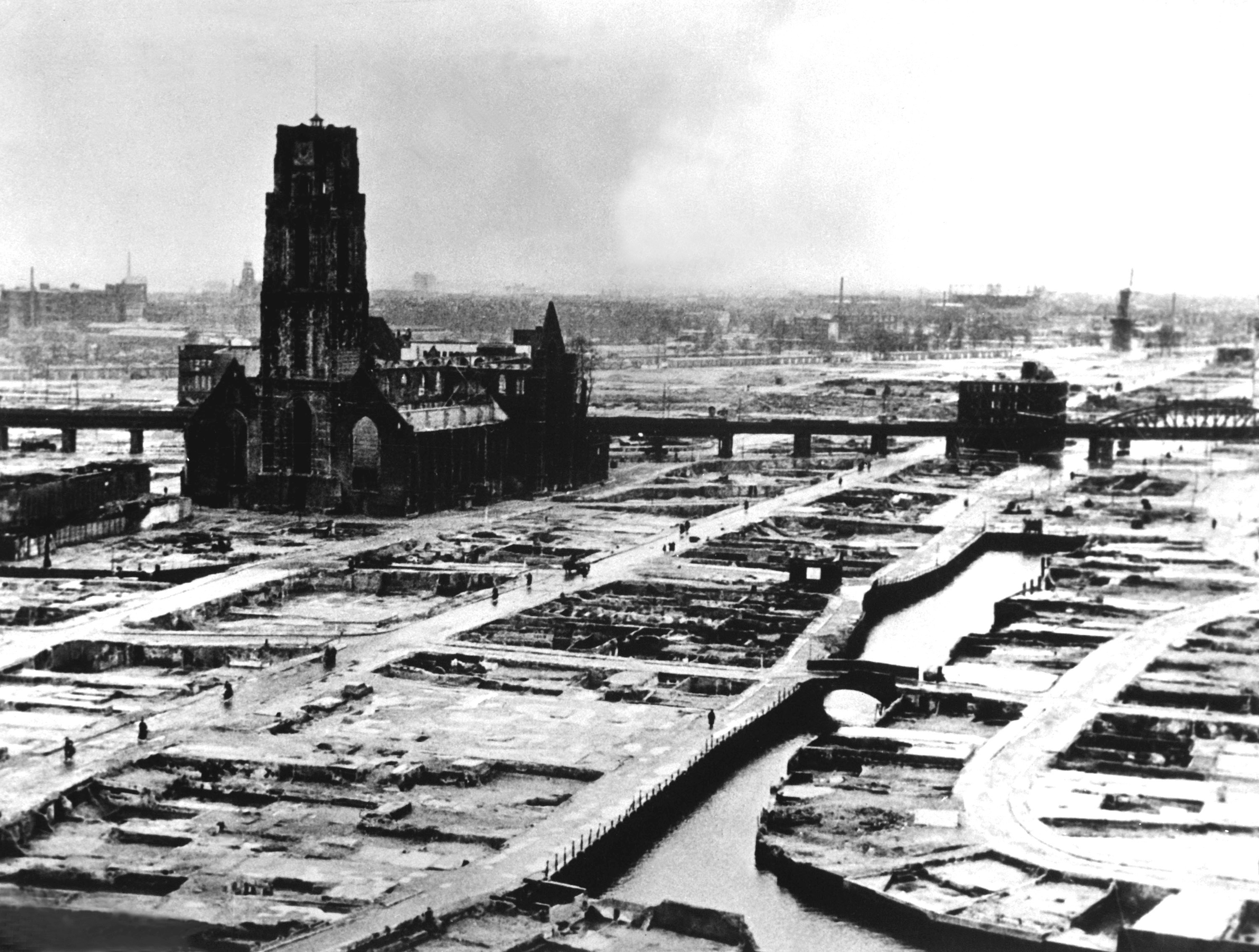
Rotterdam was destroyed by German bombers on 14 May 1940. 814 people died in the Rotterdam Blitz.

At the outbreak of World War II in 1939, the Netherlands once again declared its neutrality. However, on 10 May 1940, Germany under Adolf Hitler launched an invasion of the Netherlands and Belgium and quickly overran most of the two countries. Fighting against the Dutch army proved to be more of a burden than foreseen; the northern attack was stopped dead, the one in the middle came to a grinding halt near the Grebbeberg and many airborne assault troops were killed and taken prisoner in the west of the country. Only in the south were defences broken, but the one passage over the River Maas at Rotterdam was held by the Dutch. By 14 May, fighting in many locations had ceased and the German army could make little or no headway, so the Luftwaffe bombed Rotterdam, the second-largest city of the Netherlands, killing about 900 people, destroying most of the inner city and leaving 78,000 people homeless.

Following the bombing and German threats of the same treatment for Utrecht, the Netherlands capitulated on 15 May, except for the province of Zeeland where French and French-Moroccan troops stood side by side with the Dutch army. Still, the Dutch royal family along with some armed forces fled to the United Kingdom. Some members of the Dutch royal family eventually moved to Ottawa, Canada, until the Netherlands was liberated five years later. Princess Margriet was born in Canada, during the period the family spent in exile.

Resentment of the Germans grew as the occupation became harsher, prompting many Dutch in the latter years of the war to join the resistance. But collaboration was not uncommon either; many thousands of young Dutch males, who often supported Nazi goals and policies, volunteered for combat service on the Russian Front with the Waffen-SS and many companies worked for the German occupiers.

=== Holocaust in the Netherlands ===
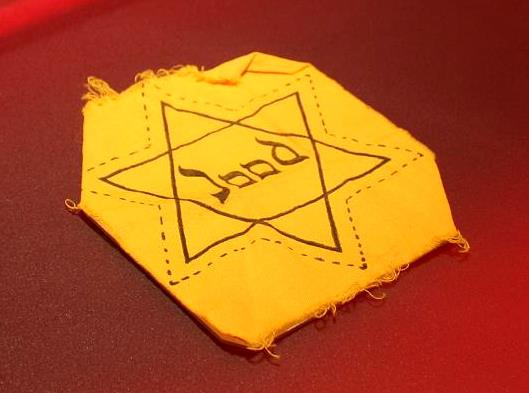
Yellow Star of David with Jood, the Dutch word for "Jew".

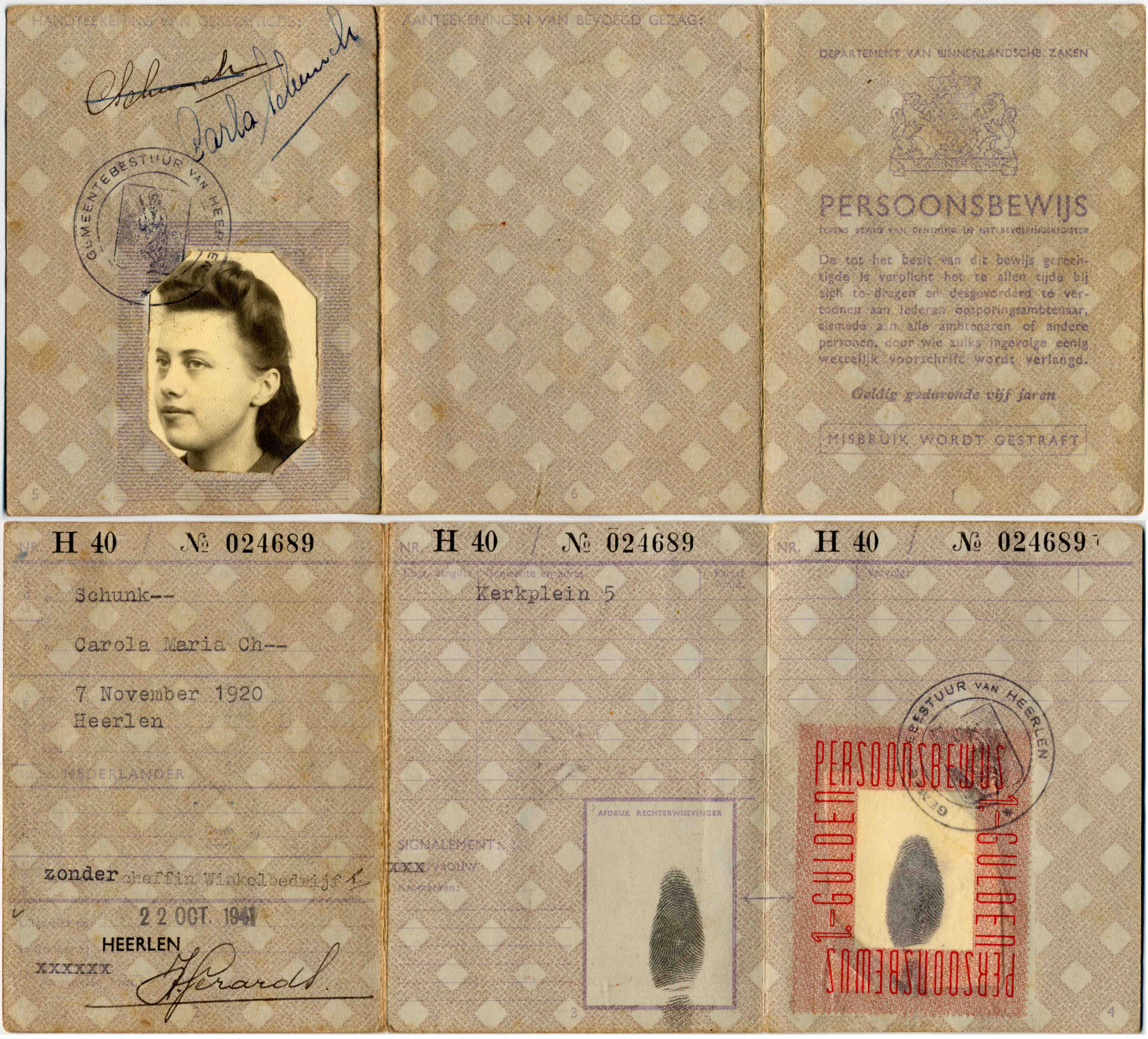
Identification papers issued to Dutch people during the war.

About 140,000 Jews lived in the Netherlands at the beginning of the war. Persecution of Dutch Jews started shortly after the occupation. At the end of the war, 40,000 Jews were still alive. Of the 100,000 Jews who did not go into hiding, about 1,000 survived the war.

The most famous victim of the Holocaust was Anne Frank, who gained worldwide fame when her diary, written while living in hiding from the Nazis in the achterhuis ("rear annex") of the house, was found and published posthumously by her father, Otto Frank. He was the only member of the family to survive the Holocaust.

=== The war in the Dutch East Indies ===
On 8 December 1941, the day after the attack on Pearl Harbor, the Netherlands declared war on Japan. The Dutch government-in-exile in London had for long been working with the UK & US governments to cut off oil supplies to Japan. Japanese forces invaded the Dutch East Indies on 11 January 1942. The Dutch surrendered on 8 March after Japanese troops landed on Java. Dutch citizens and everybody with Dutch ancestry, the so-called "Indo's" were captured and put to work in labour camps or interned. As in the Netherlands, many Dutch ships, planes and military personnel managed to reach safety, in this case to Australia; from where they were able to fight again.

=== False hopes, the Hunger Winter and Liberation ===
In Europe, after the Allies landed in Normandy in June 1944, progress was slow until the Battle of Normandy ended in August 1944. German resistance collapsed in Western Europe and the allied armies advanced quickly towards the Dutch border. The First Canadian Army and the Second British Army conducted operations on Dutch soil from September onwards. On 17 September, a daring operation, Operation Market Garden; was executed with the goal of capturing bridges across three major rivers in the southern Netherlands. Despite desperate fighting by American, British and Polish forces, the bridge at Arnhem, across the Neder Rijn, could not be captured.

Areas south of the Rhine river were liberated in the period September–December 1944, including the province of Zeeland, which was liberated in October and November in the Battle of the Scheldt. This opened Antwerp to allied shipping. The First Canadian Army held a static line along the Meuse (Dutch: Maas) from December 1944 through February 1945. The rest of the country remained occupied until the spring of 1945. In the face of Dutch defiance, the Nazis deliberately cut off food supplies resulting in near-starvation in the cities during the Hongerwinter (Hunger winter) of 1944–1945. Soup kitchens were set up but many vulnerable people died. A few days before the Allied victory, the Germans allowed emergency shipments of food.

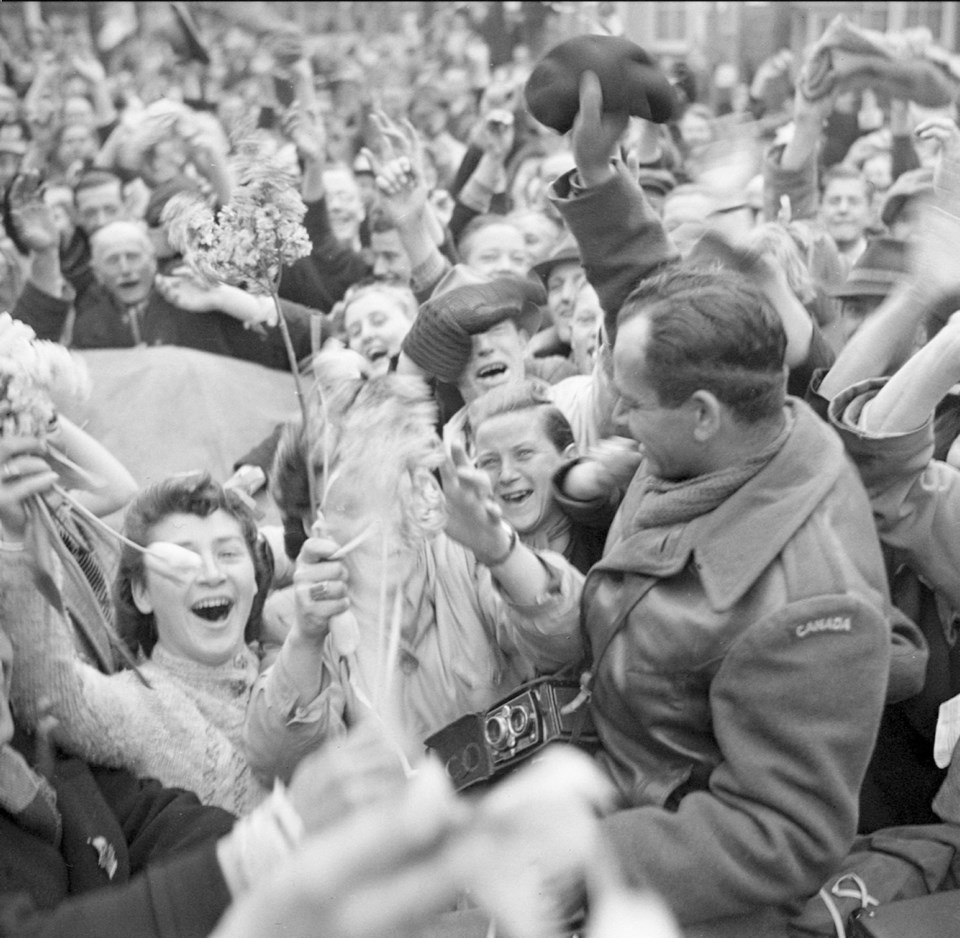
Dutch civilians celebrating the arrival of I Canadian Corps troops in Utrecht after the German surrender, 7 May 1945

The First Canadian Army launched Operation Veritable in early-February, cracking the Siegfried Line and reaching the banks of the Rhine in early March. In the final weeks of the war in Europe, the First Canadian Army was charged with clearing the Netherlands of German forces.

The Liberation of Arnhem began on 12 April 1945 and proceeded to plan, as the three infantry brigades of the 49th Division leapfrogged each other through the city. Within four days Arnhem, now a ruined city, was totally under Allied control.

The Canadians then immediately advanced further into the country, encountering and defeating a German counterattack at Otterlo and Dutch SS resistance at Ede. On 27 April a temporary truce came into effect, allowing the distribution of food aid to the starving Dutch civilians in areas under German control (Operation Manna). On 5 May 1945, Generaloberst Johannes Blaskowitz agreed to the unconditional surrender of all German forces in the Netherlands, signing the surrender to Canadian Lieutenant-General Charles Foulkes at Wageningen. (The Fifth of May is now celebrated annually in the Netherlands as Liberation Day.) Three days later Germany unconditionally surrendered, bringing the war in Europe to an end.

After the euphoria and settling of scores had ended, the Dutch were a traumatised people with a ruined economy, a shattered infrastructure and several destroyed cities including Rotterdam, Nijmegen, Arnhem and part of The Hague.

=== Post-war events ===
After the war, there were reprisals against those who had collaborated with the Nazis. Artur Seyss-Inquart, Nazi Commissioner of the Netherlands, was tried at Nüremberg.

In the early post-war years, the Netherlands made continued attempts to expand its territory by annexing neighbouring German territory. The larger annexation plans were continuously rejected by the United States, but the London conference of 1949 permitted the Netherlands to perform a smaller scale annexation. Most of the annexed territory was returned to Germany on 1 August 1963 after Germany paid the Netherlands 280 million German marks.

Operation Black Tulip was a plan in 1945 by Dutch Minister of Justice Hans Kolfschoten to evict all Germans from the Netherlands. The operation lasted from 1946 to 1948 and in the end 3,691 Germans (15% of Germans resident in the Netherlands) were deported. The operation started on 10 September 1946 in Amsterdam, where Germans and their families were taken from their homes in the middle of the night and given one hour to collect 50 kg of luggage. They were allowed to take 100 guilders. The rest of their possessions went to the state. They were taken to concentration camps near the German border, the biggest of which was Mariënbosch concentration camp near Nijmegen.

== Post-war years (1945–present) ==
The post-war years were a time of hardship, shortages and natural disaster. This was followed by large-scale public works programmes, economic recovery, European integration and the gradual introduction of a welfare state.

Immediately after the war, rationing was imposed on many goods, including: cigarettes, textiles, washing powder and coffee. Even traditional wooden shoes were rationed. There was severe housing shortages in the Netherlands as a result of the war. In the 1950s, there was mass emigration, especially to Canada, Australia and New Zealand. Government-encouraged emigration efforts to reduce population density prompted some 500,000 Dutch people to leave the country after the war. The Netherlands failed to hold the Dutch East Indies, as Indonesia became independent and 300,000 Dutch inhabitants (and their Indonesian allies) left the islands.

Post-war politics saw shifting coalition governments. The 1946 Parliamentary elections saw the Catholic People's Party (KVP) emerge as the largest party, just ahead of the socialist Labour party (PvdA). Louis J. M. Beel formed a new coalition cabinet. The United States began providing economic assistance as part of the Marshall Plan in 1948 that injected valuable funds into the economy, fostered modernisation of business, and encouraged economic cooperation.

The 1948 elections led to a new coalition led by Labor's Willem Drees. He led four successive cabinets Drees I, Drees II, Drees III and Drees IV until 1958. His tenure in office saw four major political developments: the traumas of decolonisation, economic reconstruction, the establishment of the Dutch welfare state, and international integration and co-operation, including the formation of Benelux, the OEEC, NATO, the ECSC, and the EEC.

=== Baby boom and economic reconstruction ===
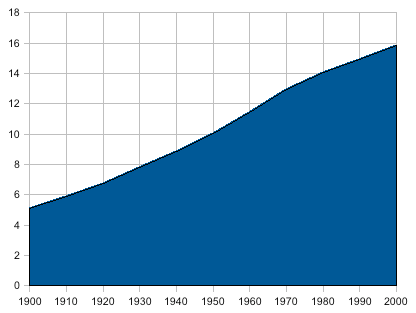
Population growth 1900–2000

Marriage rates and marital fertility rose after the war, temporarily reversing a long-term decline in marital fertility. This occurred in a post-war society marked by poverty, scarcity and frugality, with a severe housing shortage, strictly hierarchical relationships and a strong influence of religious doctrine on family life. Child-rearing advice was in demand. According to researchers Nelleke Bakker and Janneke Wubs, 140 different family manuals were published in the fifteen years after the war, compared with 173 between 1920 and 1950. One of them, Benjamin Spock's The Common Sense Book of Baby and Child Care, first published in the United States in 1946, appeared in Dutch in 1950 and became a best-seller. Bakker and Wubs describe this success as unexpected under these conditions, noting that Spock presented parenting mainly as a source of pleasure, whereas Dutch child-rearing manuals stressed its difficulties and responsibilities.

Wages were initially kept low and the recovery of consumption to pre-war levels was delayed to permit rapid rebuilding of the infrastructure. In the years after the war, unemployment fell and the economy grew at an astonishing pace, despite the high birth rate. The shattered infrastructure and destroyed cities were rebuilt. A key contribution to the recovery in the post-war Netherlands came from the Marshall Plan, which provided the country with funds, goods, raw materials and produce.

The Dutch became internationally active again. Dutch corporations, particularly Royal Dutch Shell and Philips, became internationally prominent. Businesspeople, scientists, engineers and artists from the Netherlands made important international contributions. For example, Dutch economists, especially Jan Tinbergen (1903–1994), Tjalling Koopmans (1910–1985) and Henri Theil (1924–2000), made major contributions to the mathematical and statistical methodology known as econometrics.

The increased prosperity of the post-war years was demonstrated by the increased household possession of various consumer goods. In 1977, for example, 66.7% of households had a car, 87% a washing machine, 98% a vacuum cleaner, 75% a food processor, 93% a television, 63% a cassette recorder, 72% a still camera and 85% a transistor radio, while in 1976 15% of households had a radio recorder, 75% a tape recorder, and 65% a record player.

Across Western Europe, the period from 1973 to 1981 marked the end of the booming economy of the 1960s. The Netherlands also experienced years of negative growth after that. Unemployment increased steadily, causing rapid growth in social-security expenditures. Inflation reached double digits; government surpluses disappeared. On the positive side, rich natural gas resources were developed, providing a current account trade surplus during most of the period. Public deficits were high. According to the long-term economic analysis of Horlings and Smits, the major gains in the Dutch economy were concentrated between 1870–1930 and between 1950 and 1970. Rates were much lower in 1930–1945 and after 1987.

=== Flood control ===
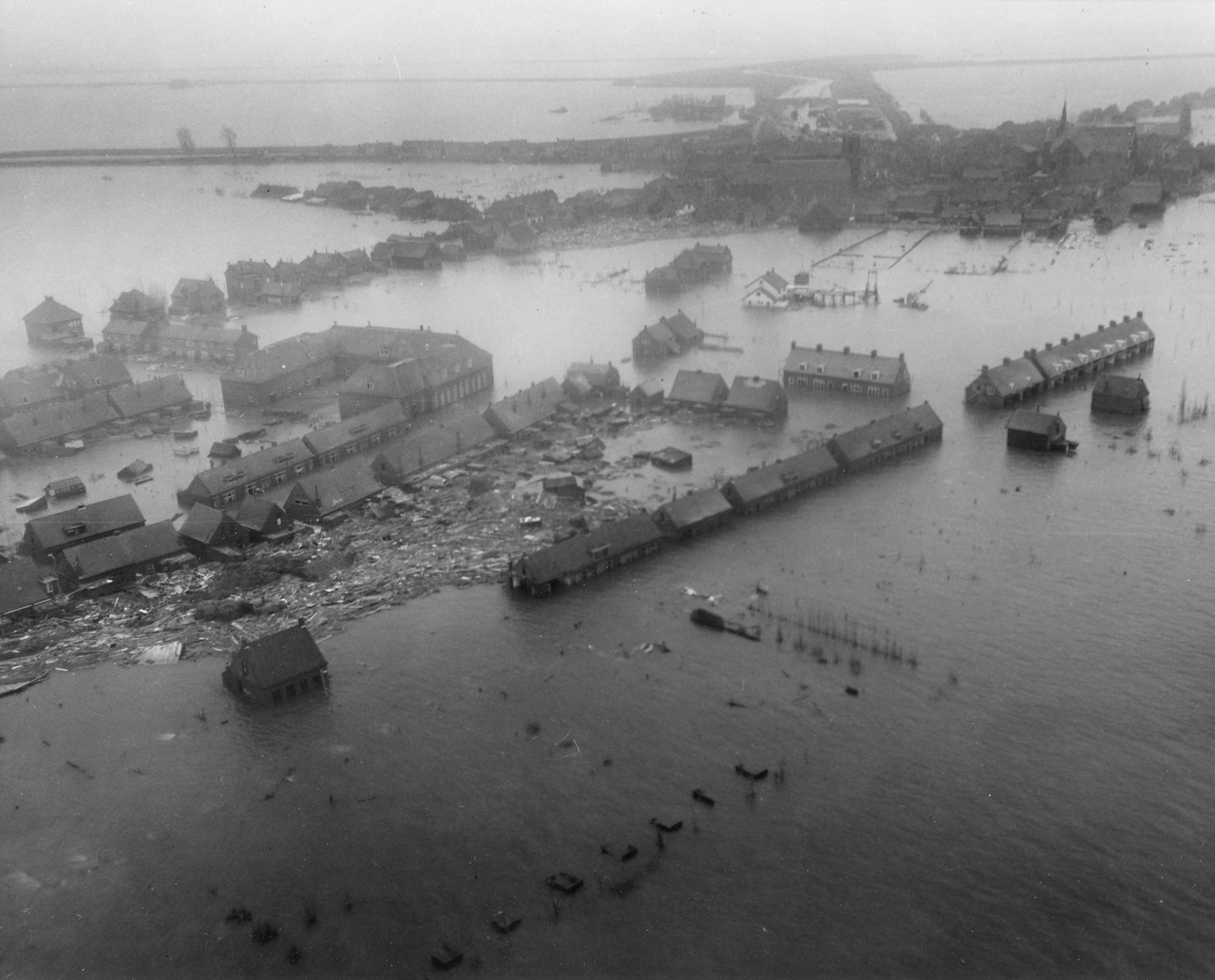
A town in Zuid Beveland inundated in 1953

The last major flood in the Netherlands took place in early-February 1953, when a huge storm caused the collapse of several dikes in the southwest of the Netherlands. More than 1,800 people drowned in the ensuing inundation.

The Dutch government subsequently decided on a large-scale programme of public works (the "Delta Works") to protect the country against future floods. The project took more than thirty years to complete. The Oosterscheldedam, an advanced sea storm barrier, became operational in 1986. The national Delta programme continues to manage these works for the government under an independent Commissioner, with the aim of making the Netherlands climate-proof and water-resilient by 2050.

=== Europeanisation, Americanisation and internationalisation ===
The European Coal and Steel Community (ECSC), was founded in 1951 by the six founding members: Belgium, the Netherlands and Luxembourg (the Benelux countries) and West Germany, France and Italy. Its purpose was to pool the steel and coal resources of the member states, and to support the economies of the participating countries. As a side effect, the ECSC helped defuse tensions between countries which had recently been fighting each other during the war. In time, this economic merger grew, adding members and broadening in scope, to become the European Economic Community, and later the European Union (EU).

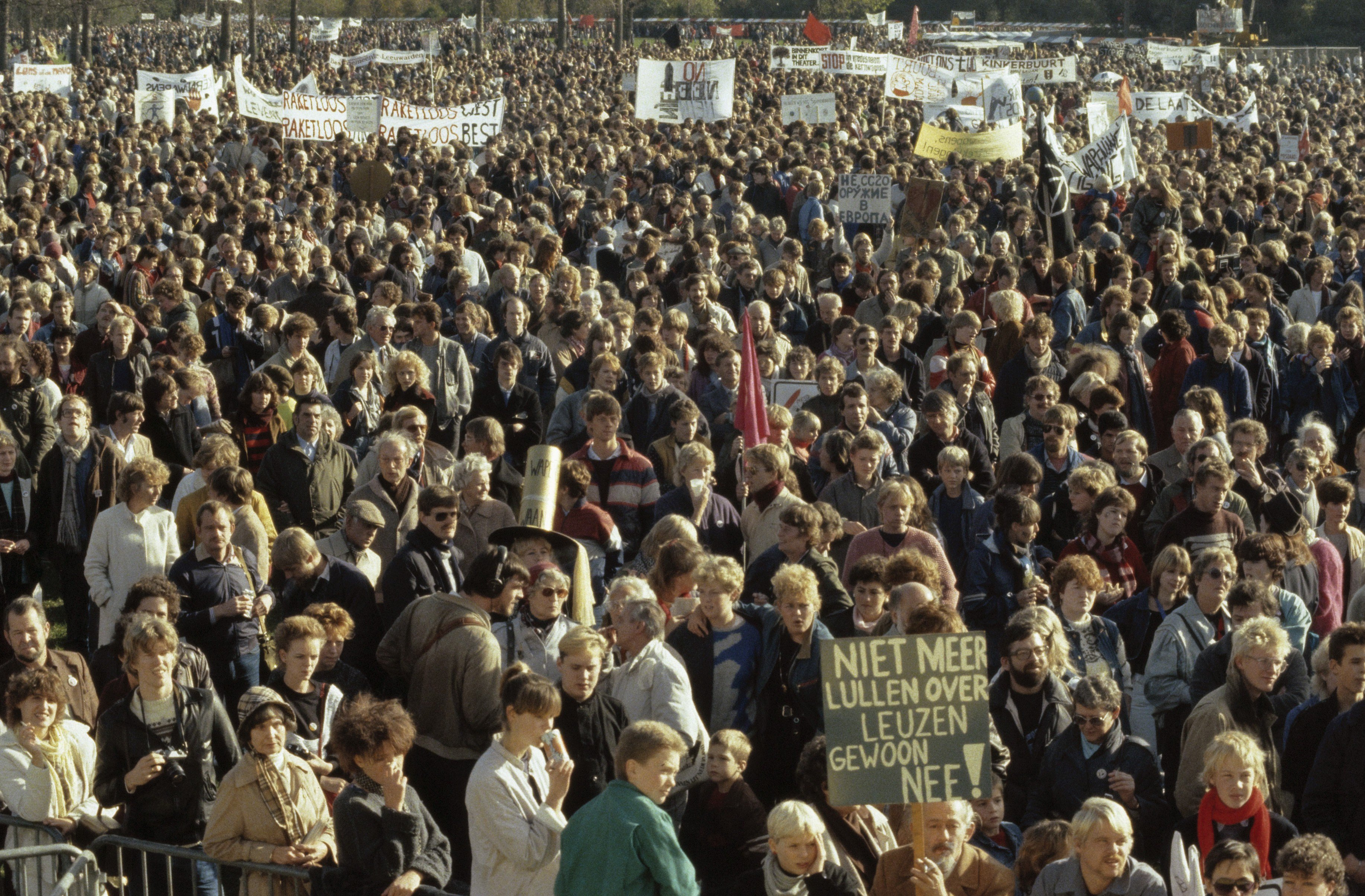
Protest in The Hague against the nuclear arms race between the U.S./NATO and the Warsaw Pact, 1983

The United States started to have more influence. After the war, higher education changed from a German model to more of an American-influenced model. American influences had been small in the interwar era, and during the war, the Nazis had emphasised the dangers of a "degraded" American culture as represented by jazz. However, the Dutch became more attracted to the United States during the post-war era, perhaps partly because of antipathy towards the Nazis but certainly because of American films and consumer goods. The Marshall Plan also introduced the Dutch to American management practices. NATO brought in American military doctrine and technology. Intellectuals, artists and the political left, however, remained more reserved about the Americans. According to Rob Kroes, the anti-Americanism in the Netherlands was ambiguous: American culture was both accepted and criticised at the same time.

The Netherlands is a founding member of the EU, NATO, OECD and WTO. Together with Belgium and Luxembourg it forms the Benelux economic union. The country is host to the Organisation for the Prohibition of Chemical Weapons and five international courts: the Permanent Court of Arbitration, the International Court of Justice, the International Criminal Tribunal for the Former Yugoslavia, the International Criminal Court and the Special Tribunal for Lebanon. The first four are situated in The Hague, as is the EU's criminal intelligence agency Europol and judicial co-operation agency Eurojust. This has led to the city being dubbed "the world's legal capital".

=== Decolonisation and multiculturalism ===
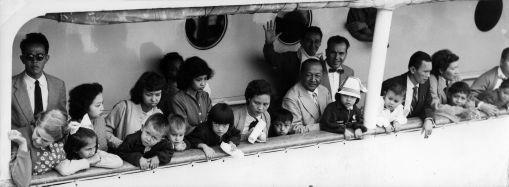
Arrival of the vessel Castel Felice with "Indos" (Dutch-Indonesian Eurasians) on the Lloydkade in Rotterdam, 20 May 1958

The Dutch East Indies had long been a valuable resource to the Netherlands, generating about 14% of the Dutch national income in the 1930s, and was home to thousands of Dutch people and officials, businessmen and missionaries. By the first half of the twentieth century, new organisations and leadership had developed in the Dutch East Indies. Under its Ethical Policy, the government had helped create an educated Indonesian elite. These profound changes constituted the "Indonesian National Revival". Increased political activism and Japanese occupation, both of which undermined Dutch rule, culminated in nationalists proclaiming independence on 17 August 1945, two days after the latter's surrender. The Dutch did not plan to let go of Indonesia. However, the Netherlands was much too weak to reconquer the country. The Japanese had imprisoned all the Dutch residents, and turned the islands over to a native government, which was widely popular. The British military arrived to disarm the Japanese. The Dutch finally returned and attempted to eradicate the Indonesian National Revolution with force, sometimes brutal in nature as exemplified by the Rawagede massacre.

There were hundreds of thousands of Indonesians who supported the Dutch position; when Independence finally arrived, most of them were relocated to the Netherlands. The UK mediated a compromise signed in March 1947 whereby de facto control of the new Indonesian Republic was acknowledged over Java, Maduro and Sumatra, while acknowledging Dutch control over the numerous smaller and far less important islands. Under a previous agreement, there was to be a federated Indonesian state and a framework for this federation to be in a confederal union with the Netherlands. However, this arrangement was never fully implemented and was eventually dissolved by both parties in the mid 1950s. The Indonesians wanted complete transfer of power, and the Dutch refused. By 1946, the United States was financing the Dutch in Indonesia, and was able to exert pressure on The Hague. Increasing international pressure—including American hints about cutting off military funds—forced the Netherlands to withdraw. A decisive episode was the success of the Indonesian Republic in crushing a Communist revolt. Washington now realised that Indonesia was part of the Cold War fight against communism, and the Indonesian government was a necessary ally—and that the Dutch tactics were counterproductive and chaotic, and could only provide help to Communist insurgencies. However, the politics of Dutch decolonization were largely muddled and slow-going because of the expansionist attitude of the nascent Indonesian government, as well as Dutch leaders feeling obligated to protect other island regions from military skirmishes with Indonesia by sending troops to them as a protective measure. The Netherlands formally recognised Indonesian independence on 27 December 1949, when a "transfer of sovereignty took place", and on this date, Dutch politicians and military leaders stopped trying to hold Indonesia back from its attempt to dominate other regions. Public opinion blamed Washington for the Dutch colonial failure. Only Irian, the western half of New Guinea remained under Dutch control as Dutch New Guinea until 1961, when the Netherlands transferred sovereignty of this area to Indonesia.

During and after the Indonesian National Revolution, over 350,000 people, left Indonesia for the Netherlands. This included 250,000 Europeans and "Indos" (Dutch-Indonesian Eurasians), Along with 100,000 military conscripts, and 12,000 South Moluccans who settled in the Netherlands. Similarly after independence in 1975, 115,000 Surinamese migrated to the Netherlands. This out-migration occurred in five distinct waves over a period of 20 years. It included Indos (many of whom spent the war years in Japanese concentration camps), former South Moluccan soldiers and their families, "New-Guinea Issue" Dutch citizens, Dutch citizens from Dutch New Guinea (including Papuan civil servants and their families), and other Indos who had remained behind but later regretted their decision to take out Indonesian citizenship.

The Indos of Indonesian descent (now numbering around 680,000) is the largest ethnic minority group in the Netherlands. They are integrated into Dutch society, but they have also retained many aspects of their culture and have added a distinct Indonesian flavour to the Netherlands.

Although it was originally feared that the loss of the Dutch East Indies would contribute to an economic decline, the Dutch economy experienced exceptional growth (partly because a disproportionate amount of Marshall Plan aid was received) in the 1950s and 1960s. In fact, the demand for labour was so strong that immigration was actively encouraged, first from Italy and Spain then later on, in larger numbers, from Turkey and Morocco.

Suriname became independent on 25 November 1975. The Dutch government supported independence because it wanted to stem the flow of immigrants from Suriname and also to end its colonial status. However, about one-third of the entire population of Suriname, fearing political unrest and economic decline, relocated to the Netherlands, creating a Surinamese community in the Netherlands that is now roughly as large as the population of Suriname itself.

=== Liberalisation ===
When the post-war baby boom children grew up, they led the revolt in the 1960s against all rigidities in Dutch life. The 1960s and 1970s were a time of great social and cultural change, such as rapid de-pillarization leading to the erosion of the old divisions along class and religious lines. A youth culture emerged all across Western Europe and the United States, characterised by student rebellion, informality, sexual freedom, informal clothes, new hairstyles, protest music, drugs and idealism. Young people, and students in particular, rejected traditional mores, and pushed for change over matters such as: women's rights, sexuality, disarmament and environmental issues.

Secularisation, or the decline in religiosity, first became noticeable after 1960 in the Protestant rural areas of Friesland and Groningen. Then, it spread to Amsterdam, Rotterdam and the other major cities in the west. Finally, the Catholic southern areas showed religious decline. As the social distance between the Calvinists and Catholics narrowed (and they began to intermarry), it became possible to merge their parties. The Anti-Revolutionary Party (ARP) in 1977 merged with the Catholic People's Party (KVP) and the Protestant Christian Historical Union (CHU) to form the Christian Democratic Appeal (CDA). However, a countervailing trend later appeared as the result of a religious revival in the Protestant Bible Belt, and the growth of the Muslim and Hindu communities as a result of immigration from overseas and high fertility levels.

After 1982, there was a retrenchment of the welfare system, especially regarding old-age pensions, unemployment benefits, and disability pensions/early retirement benefits.

Following the 1994 general election, in which the CDA lost a considerable portion of its representatives, the social-liberal Democrats 66 (D66) doubled in size and formed a coalition with the Labour Party (PvdA), and the People's Party for Freedom and Democracy (VVD). This purple coalition marked the first absence of the CDA in a government for decades. During the Purple Coalition years, a period lasting until the rise of the populist politician Pim Fortuyn, the government addressed issues previously viewed as taboo under the Christian-influenced cabinet. At this time, the Dutch government introduced unprecedented legislation based on a policy of official tolerance (Dutch: gedoogbeleid). Abortion and euthanasia were decriminalised, but stricter guidelines were set for their implementation. Drug policy, especially with regard to the regulation of cannabis, was reformed. Prostitution was legalised, but confined to brothels where the health and safety of those involved could be properly monitored. With the 2001 Same-Sex Marriage Act, the Netherlands became the first country in the world to legalise same-sex marriage. In addition to social reforms, the Purple Coalition also presided over a period of remarkable economic prosperity.

=== Recent politics ===
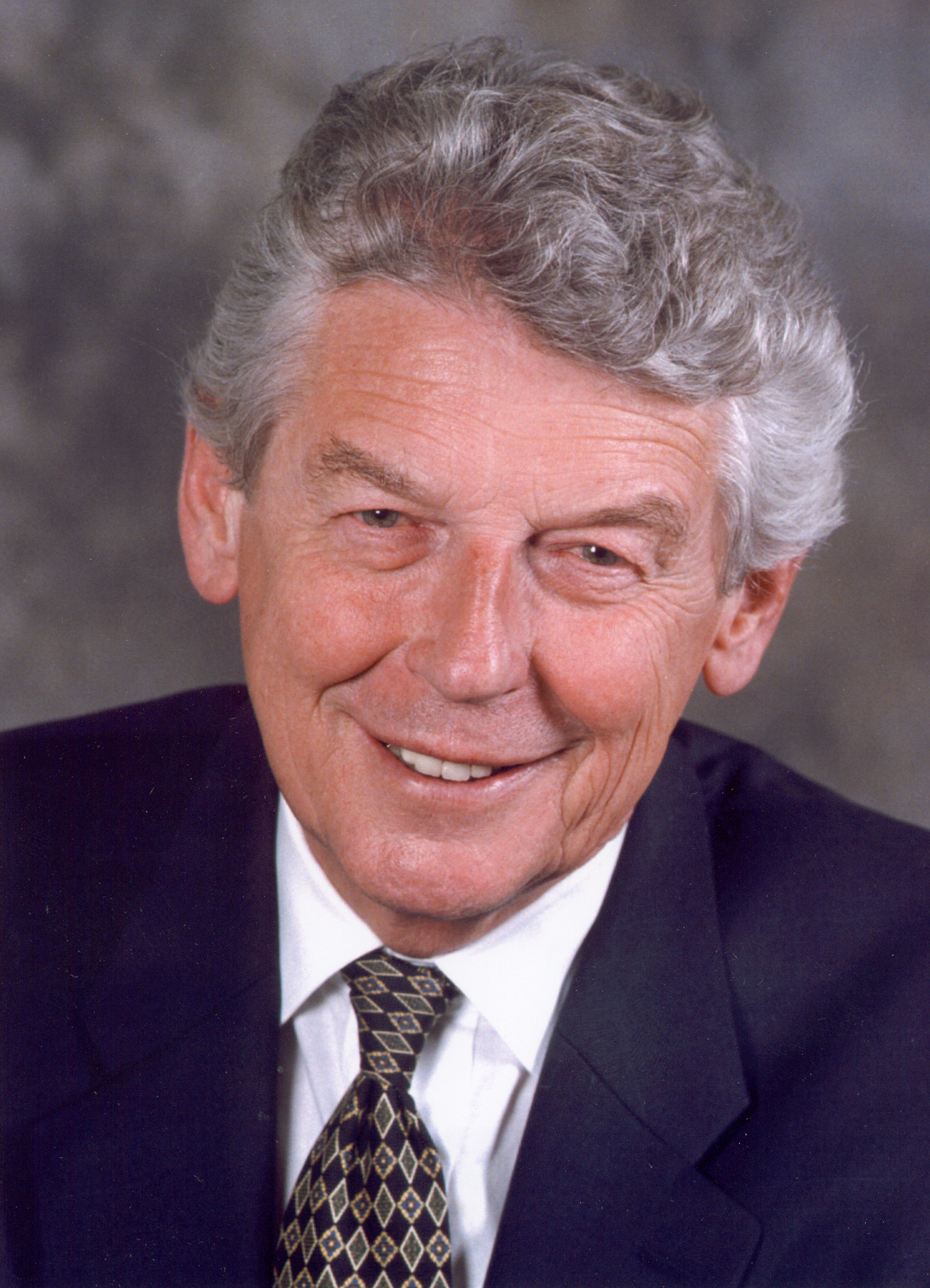
Wim Kok served as Prime Minister of the Netherlands from 22 August 1994 until 22 July 2002.

At the 1998 general election, the Purple Coalition consisting of Social Democrats, and left and right-wing Liberals, increased its majority. Both the social democratic PvdA and the conservative liberal VVD grew at the cost of their junior partner in cabinet, the progressive liberal D66. The voters rewarded the Purple Coalition for its economic performance, which had included reduction of unemployment and the budget deficit, steady growth and job creation combined with wage freezes and trimming of the welfare state, together with a policy of fiscal restraint. The result was the second Kok cabinet.

The power of the coalition waned with the introduction of List Pim Fortuyn in the Dutch general election of 2002, a populist party, which ran a distinctly anti-immigration and anti-purple campaign, citing "Purple Chaos" (Puinhopen van Paars) as the source of the countries social woes. In the first political assassination for three centuries, Fortuyn was murdered with little over a week left before the election. In the wake of its leader's death, LPF swept the elections, entering parliament with one-sixth of the seats, while the PvdA (Labour) lost half of its seats. The ensuing cabinet was formed by CDA, VVD and LPF, led by Prime Minister Jan Peter Balkenende. Though the party succeeded in displacing the rival Purple Coalition, without the charismatic figure of Pim Fortuyn at its helm, it proved to be short-lived; lasting a mere 87 days in government.

Another murder that caused great upheaval took place on 2 November 2004, when film director and publicist Theo van Gogh was assassinated by a Dutch-Moroccan youth with Islamic extremist views because of Van Gogh's alleged blasphemy. One week later, several arrests were made of several would-be Islamic terrorists, who have later been found guilty of conspiracy with terrorist intentions, this verdict was however reversed on appeal. All this sparked a debate on the position of Islamic extremism and of Islam generally in Dutch society, and on immigration and integration. The personal protection of most politicians, especially of the Islam critic Ayaan Hirsi Ali, was stepped up to unprecedented levels.

=== 21st century ===
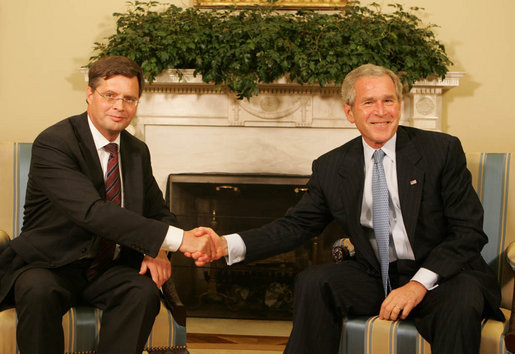
Dutch Prime Minister Jan Peter Balkenende and U.S. President George W. Bush in the Oval Office on 5 June 2008

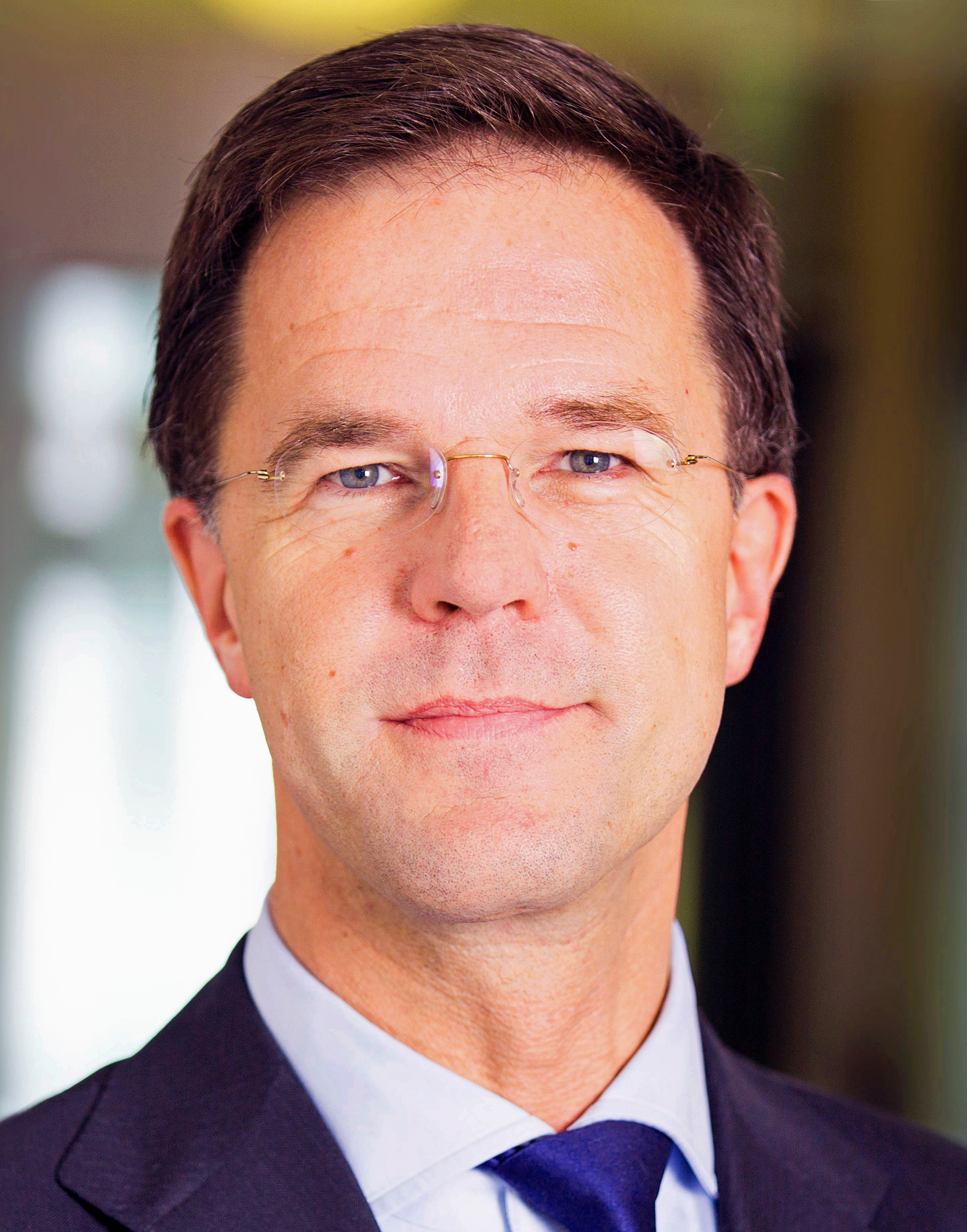
Mark Rutte, Prime Minister of the Netherlands from 2010 to 2024

By 2000, the population had increased to 15,900,000 people, making the Netherlands one of the most densely populated countries in the world. Urban development has led to the development of a conurbation called the Randstad (Dutch: Randstad), which includes the four largest cities (Amsterdam, Rotterdam, The Hague and Utrecht), and the surrounding areas. With a population of 7,100,000; it is one of the largest conurbations in Europe.

On Koningsdag (King's Day), 30 April 2013, Prince Willem Alexander appointed as the King, having ascended the throne following his mother's abdication, Queen Beatrix. At the time of her abdication at age 75, Beatrix was the oldest reigning monarch in the country's history.

On 17 July 2014, 196 Dutch people are among 298 people on aboard were killed in the Malaysia Airlines Flight MH17 plane shot down by the air-surface missile in Eastern Ukraine near Russian border. A referendum on the approval of the Association Agreement between the European Union and Ukraine was held in The Hague on 6 April 2016.

VVD Prime Minister Mark Rutte won the 2017 general election and formed a third government and was in first few months challenged after the People's Party for Freedom and Democracy voted since 2006.

In late February 2020 the Netherlands confirmed the first case of COVID-19, and lockdown was officially announced on 19 December 2021. In the second quarter of 2020 the Dutch economy contracted by 8.4 percent compared to the previous quarter. In subsequent quarters gross domestic product (GDP) rebounded. The first COVID-19 vaccines were given in early January 2021. In total, as of 30 July 2023, 12,370,518 people got their primary series vaccination.

In March 2021, centre-right VVD of Prime Minister Mark Rutte was the winner of the elections, securing 35 out of 150 seats. The second biggest party was the centre-left D66 with 24 seats. Geert Wilders' far-right party lost its support. Prime Minister Mark Rutte, in power since 2010, formed his fourth coalition government.
