= Westbroek (disambiguation) =

Westbroek is a village in the Dutch province of Utrecht.

Westbroek may also refer to:

== People ==
- Eva-Maria Westbroek (born 1970), Dutch soprano opera singer
- Henk Westbroek (born 1952), Dutch radiohost, singer, songwriter, cafe owner, and political activist
- Mario Westbroek (born 1961), Dutch sprinter who competed at the 1980 Summer Olympics
- Rochus Westbroek (born 1971), Dutch field hockey player
- Thijs Westbroek, a.k.a. Brooks (born 1995), Dutch DJ and record producer

== Other ==
- Battle of Westbroek, fought near Westbroek in 1481
- De Brauw Blackstone Westbroek, a Dutch law firm headquartered in Amsterdam
