= Egbert Ho =

Dutch field hockey player (born 1978)

Egbert Ho (born March 20, 1978) is a former field hockey midfielder from the Netherlands, who earned a total number of sixteen caps for the Dutch national team in 2004 under coach Terry Walsh. Ho played club hockey for HC Klein Zwitserland in The Hague.
