= James Duthie (field hockey) =

British field hockey player (born 1957)

Personal information
- Born: 27 October 1957 (age 68) Glasgow, Scotland
- Height: 183 cm (6 ft 0 in)
- Weight: 72 kg (159 lb)

Sport
- Sport: Field hockey
- Position: Sweeper
Senior career
Years	Team	Caps	Goals
1978–1993	Southgate	-	-
1993–1995	Surbiton	-	-
National team
Years	Team	Caps	Goals
–	Great Britain		-
–	England		-
Medal record
Men's field hockey
Representing Great Britain
Olympic Games
Bronze medal – third place	1984 Los Angeles	Team competition
Champions Trophy
Bronze medal – third place	1978 Lahore	Team competition
Bronze medal – third place	1984 Karachi	Team competition
Silver medal – second place	1985 Perth	Team competition

James Livingstone Duthie (born 27 October 1957) is a former field hockey player, who won the bronze medal at the 1984 Summer Olympics.

== Biography ==
Duthie was born in Glasgow but was educated at Bishop's Stortford College and lived in Bishop's Stortford while the captain of the England U21 team in 1978.

He played club hockey for Southgate in the Men's England Hockey League and in July 1978 he was selected for the England squad and was part of the bronze medal winning Great Britain team that competed at the inaugural 1978 Men's Hockey Champions Trophy, in Lahore, Pakistan. He also appeared for the King's Lynn based Pelicans during the indoor season. He was selected for the Great Britain team for the 1980 Olympic Games in Moscow, but subsequently did not attend due to the boycott.

He played at the 1982 Men's Hockey World Cup and the 1984 Olympic Games in Los Angeles, he represented Great Britain in the field hockey tournament and won a bronze medal with the team. He was also part of the bronze medal winning Great Britain team that competed at the 1984 Men's Hockey Champions Trophy, in Karachi, Pakistan and the silver medal winning team the following year at the 1985 Men's Hockey Champions Trophy in Perth, Australia.

Duthie missed out on selection for the 1986 Men's Hockey World Cup because he broke his leg shortly before the event and missed the 1988 Summer Olympics after sustaining another injury.

He coached the Harrow Hockey Club in 1992/93, and was player/coach for Surbiton in 1993/94, while also manager of the England U18 team.

He was one of the coaches of the men's GB team at the 1996 Atlanta Olympics.
