= 1982 EuroHockey Club Champions Cup =

Ninth edition of Europe's premier field hockey club competition

The 1982 EuroHockey Club Champions Cup was the ninth edition of Europe's premier field hockey club competition. It was won by Dynamo Almaty, which became the first Soviet club winning the competition, in a final match against defending champions HC Klein Zwitserland. Barcelona's Real Club de Polo attained the 3rd place again.

== 1st division (Versailles) ==
=== Group stage ===
==== Group A ====
1. (Netherlands) HC Klein Zwitserland - 6 points
2. (England) Slough Hockey Club|Slough HC - 4 points
3. (Germany) Gladbacher HTC - 2 points
4. (Italy) SG Amsicora Cagliari - 0 points

==== Group B ====
1. (Soviet Union) Dynamo Almaty - 5 points
2. (Spain) Real Club de Polo, Barcelona - 4 points
3. (Belgium) Uccle Sport - 2 points
4. (Ireland) Lisnagarvey HC - 1 point

=== Play-offs ===
==== Final ====
- Dynamo Almaty 4-3 HC Klein Zwitserland

==== 3rd place ====
- Real Club de Polo, Barcelona 3-1 Slough HC

==== 5th place ====
- Gladbacher HTC 5-2 Uccle Sport

==== 7th place ====
- Lisnagarvey HC 2-1 SG Amsicora Cagliari

=== Standings ===
1. (Soviet Union) Dynamo Almaty
2. (Netherlands) HC Klein Zwitserland (defending champions)
3. (Spain) Real Club de Polo, Barcelona
4. (England) Slough HC
5. (West Germany) Gladbacher HTC
6. (Belgium) Uccle Sport
7. (Ireland) Lisnagarvey HC
8. (Italy) SG Amsicora Cagliari
- Ireland and Italy are relegated to 2nd Division for the 1983 Champions Cup.

== 2nd Division (Cardiff) ==
=== Standings ===
1. (Gibraltar) Rock Gunners
2. (France) HC Amiens
3. (Wales) Cardiff HC
4. (Scotland) Edinburgh HC
5. (Socialist Federal Republic of Yugoslavia) HK Suboticanka
6. (Austria) Wien
7. (Sweden) Partille SC
8. (Denmark) Slagelse HC
- Gibraltar and France are promoted to 1st Division for the 1982 Champions Cup.
