= Stephen Batchelor =

Stephen Batchelor may refer to:

- Stephen Batchelor (author) (born 1953), Scottish-born author of books relating to Buddhism
- Stephen Batchelor (field hockey) (born 1961), British Olympic field hockey player
