= Jon Potter =

Field hockey player and businessman

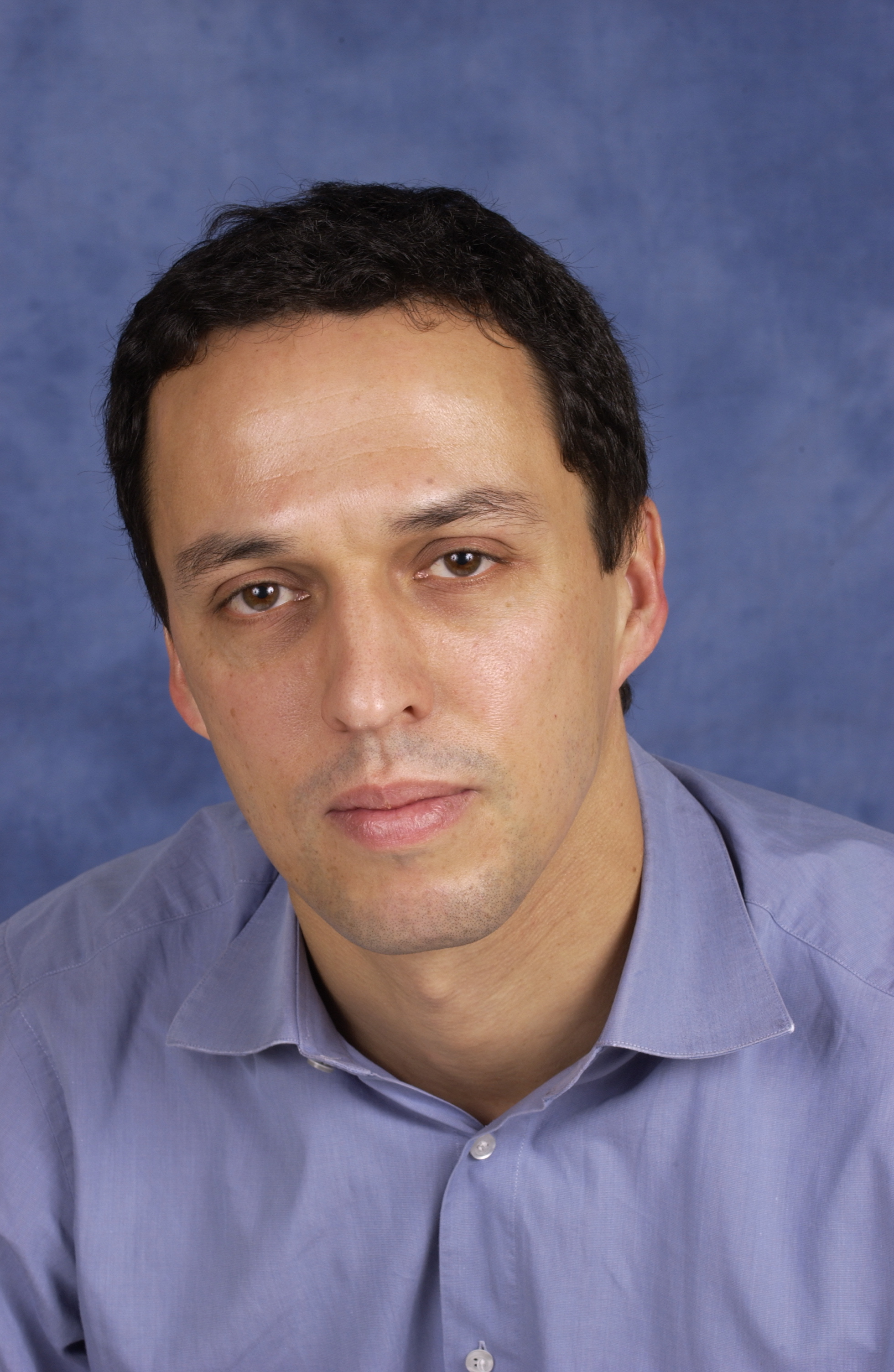
- Potter in 2003

Personal information
- Born: 19 November 1963 (age 62) Paddington, London, England
- Height: 173 cm (5 ft 8 in)
- Weight: 70 kg (154 lb)

Sport
- Sport: Field hockey
Senior career
Years	Team	Caps	Goals
1981–1982	Maidenhead	-	-
1982–1999	Hounslow	-	-
National team
Years	Team	Caps	Goals
–	Great Britain	126	-
–	England	108	-
Medal record
Men's field hockey
Representing Great Britain
Olympic Games
Gold medal – first place	1988 Seoul	Team competition
Bronze medal – third place	1984 Los Angeles	Team competition
Champions Trophy
Bronze medal – third place	1984 Karachi	Team competition
Silver medal – second place	1985 Perth	Team competition
Representing England
World Cup
Silver medal – second place	1986 London	Team competition
European Championship
Silver medal – second place	1987 Moscow	Team
Bronze medal – third place	1991 Paris	Team

Jonathan Nicholas Mark Potter (born 19 November 1963) is a former field hockey player who was a member of the gold-winning Great Britain squad at the 1988 Summer Olympics in Seoul. After his playing career he became the managing director of House of Suntory and Maison Courvoisier at Suntory Global Spirits.

== Biography ==
Potter was born in Paddington, Greater London, in an Anglo-Indian family and brought up in Slough, England. He attended Burnham Grammar School from 1976 to 1982, and represented England Schoolboys at field hockey. Potter graduated from Southampton University in 1986 with a BA (Hons) in geography, and attended Aston Business School (1986–87) to obtain his MBA.

Potter represented Great Britain and England in field hockey. He competed in three Olympic Games, earning a bronze medal at the 1984 Summer Olympics in Los Angeles. and winning a gold medal at the 1988 Summer Olympics in Seoul.

In total Potter won 126 caps for Great Britain and 108 caps for England, scoring 41 international goals. He competed in three World Cups, winning a silver medal at the Hockey World Cup in 1986 in London, and in three European Cups, winning silver in Moscow (1987) and bronze in Paris (1991). Potter was also part of the bronze medal winning Great Britain team that competed at the 1984 Men's Hockey Champions Trophy, in Karachi, Pakistan and the silver medal winning team the following year at the 1985 Men's Hockey Champions Trophy in Perth, Australia.

He played club hockey with Hounslow Hockey Club in the Men's England Hockey League, where he helped them win the European Cup Winners Cup in 1990 and won the Hockey Association Cup four times as well as the National League title twice.

He broke Richard Leman's record of 228 Great Britain and England appearances in November 1994. He retired from international hockey in 1995 and was a board member of England Hockey Ltd from 2003 to 2007.

In 2006, he unveiled the new Teddington HC clubhouse along with former teammate Jason Laslett. In December 2024, he joined the board of directors for USA Field Hockey.
