= Steven van Randwijck =

American field hockey player

Steven Rutger Jules van Randwijck (born August 27, 1969 in Washington, D.C., United States) is a former field hockey midfielder, who competed for the United States and finished twelfth with the national squad at the 1996 Summer Olympics in Atlanta. He grew up in the Netherlands, and played club hockey for HC Klein Zwitserland from The Hague.
