= Richard Leman =

British field hockey player

Richard Leman OBE
Personal information
- Born: 13 July 1959 (age 67) East Grinstead, West Sussex, England
- Height: 180 cm (5 ft 11 in)
- Weight: 75 kg (165 lb)

Sport
- Sport: Field hockey
Senior career
Years	Team	Caps	Goals
1978–1993	East Grinstead	-	-
National team
Years	Team	Caps	Goals
–	Great Britain & England	228	-
Medal record
Men's field hockey
Representing Great Britain
Olympic Games
Gold medal – first place	1988 Seoul	Team
Bronze medal – third place	1984 Los Angeles	Team
Champions Trophy
Bronze medal – third place	1984 Karachi	Team
Silver medal – second place	1985 Perth	Team
Representing England
World Cup
Silver medal – second place	1986 London	Team
European Championship
Silver medal – second place	1987 Moscow	Team

Richard Alexander Leman OBE (born 13 July 1959) is a former field hockey player who was a member of the gold medal-winning Great Britain squad in the 1988 Summer Olympics in Seoul.

== Biography ==
Leman was born in East Grinstead, West Sussex. Between 1973 and 1977, he was educated at Gresham's School, Holt, where he played in the school's 1st XI hockey team and Captained the 1st XI cricket team and had England Schoolboy trials for both sports.

He played club hockey for East Grinstead Hockey Club in the Men's England Hockey League and played in the 1982 Men's Hockey World Cup and won a bronze medal at the 1984 Summer Olympics in Los Angeles. He also won silver with the England squad at the 1986 Men's Hockey World Cup in London.

In 1984 Leman was awarded UK Hockey Player of the Year. He was part of the bronze medal winning Great Britain team that competed at the 1984 Men's Hockey Champions Trophy, in Karachi, Pakistan and the silver medal winning team the following year at the 1985 Men's Hockey Champions Trophy in Perth, Australia.

Still at East Grinstead and after the 1988 Olympic gold medal he represented and captained England at the 1990 Men's Hockey World Cup.

He captained Great Britain and England from 1988 to 1990 ending his career with 228 caps, a record until beaten by Jon Potter in November 1994.

Leman joined the Board of England Hockey in 2002 having served as a vice president for the previous year. He later became President of Great Britain Hockey in 2007 finishing his term in 2017 following the Olympic Gold medal won by the Women's team at Rio in 2016. He was also a member of the British Olympic Association Executive Board from 2005 to 2016. In 2017 Leman was appointed as a Non Executive director of British Ski and Snowboard and was nominated as the representative of the BOA on the British Olympic Foundation Charity Board.

He has also been involved in the running of East Grinstead Sports Club since 1988. He set up the East Grinstead Sports Club Charity in 2003 and was chairman of the board until 2010. He remains an active Trustee of the club.

In his business career, he has founded several businesses in the recruitment sector and his first company, Olympian Consultancy, was listed as 8th in the Sunday Times Fast Track 100 companies for 1999. In the same year, Leman won the Durlacher Executive of the Year Award, as well as runner-up in the Sussex Businessman of the Year Award. He is currently Chairman of Gold Group Recruitment, a technology and engineering recruitment firm working with companies across the globe. In addition he is Chairman of Clearwater People Solutions and Non Exec Chairman of SLC, a sports and leisure consultancy.

He was appointed an OBE in the Queen's Birthday Honours list in 2018.
