= Sander Dreesmann =

Dutch field hockey player

Sander Dreesmann (born 21 August 1977) is a former Dutch field hockey player.

He played for the Dutch hockey team HC Klein Zwitserland. For the 2001-2002 season Dreesmann scored 24 goals.
