= 1983 EuroHockey Club Champions Cup =

The 1983 EuroHockey Club Champions Cup was the tenth installment of Europe's premier field hockey club competition. It was won by defending champions Dynamo Almaty on HC Klein Zwitserland in a replay of the past edition's final match, confirming the progress of Soviet hockey. 1976-78 champions Southgate HC attained the third place.

== 1st division (The Hague) ==
=== Group stage ===
==== Group A ====
1. (Soviet Union) Dynamo Almaty - 5 points
2. (England) Southgate HC - 4 points
3. (West Germany) HC Heidelberg - 2 points
4. (France) HC Amiens - 1 point

==== Group B ====
1. (Netherlands) HC Klein Zwitserland - 5 points
2. (Spain) Real Club de Polo, Barcelona - 3 points
3. (Belgium) Uccle Sport - 3 points
4. (Gibraltar) Rock Gunners - 0 points

=== Play-offs ===
==== Final ====
- Dynamo Almaty 4-2 HC Klein Zwitserland

==== 3rd place ====
- Southgate HC 3-1 Real Club de Polo, Barcelona

==== 5th place ====
- Uccle Sport 3-0 HC Heidelberg

==== 7th place ====
- HC Amiens 2-0 Rock Gunners

=== Standings ===
1. (Soviet Union) Dynamo Almaty (defending champions)
2. (Netherlands) HC Klein Zwitserland
3. (England) Southgate HC
4. (Spain) Real Club de Polo, Barcelona
5. (Belgium) Uccle Sport
6. (West Germany) HC Heidelberg
7. (France) HC Amiens
8. (Gibraltar) Rock Gunners
- France and Gibraltar are relegated to 2nd Division for the 1984 Champions Cup.

== 2nd Division (Subotica) ==
=== Group stage ===
==== Group A ====
1. (Ireland) Branbridge HC - 6 points
2. (Socialist Federal Republic of Yugoslavia) HK Suboticanka - 3 points
3. (Switzerland) Rot-Weiss Wettingen - 2 points
4. (Austria) Postsportverein Wien

==== Group B ====
1. (Italy) Marilena Rome - 4
2. (Wales) Cardiff HC - 1
3. (Czechoslovakia) Slavia Prague - 1

=== Play-offs ===
==== 1st place ====
- Marilena Rome 2-0 Banbridge HC

==== 3rd place ====
- HK Suboticanka 5-0 Cardiff HC

==== 5th place ====
- Slavia Prague 1-0 Rot-Weiss Wettingen

=== Standings ===
1. (Italy) Marilena Rome
2. (Ireland) Banbridge HC
3. (Socialist Federal Republic of Yugoslavia) HK Suboticanka
4. (Wales) Cardiff HC
5. (Czechoslovakia) Slavia Prague
6. (Switzerland) Rot-Weiss Wettingen
7. (Austria) Postsportverein Wien
- Italy and Ireland are promoted to 1st Division for the 1984 Champions Cup.
