= Hidde Kruize =

Dutch field hockey player

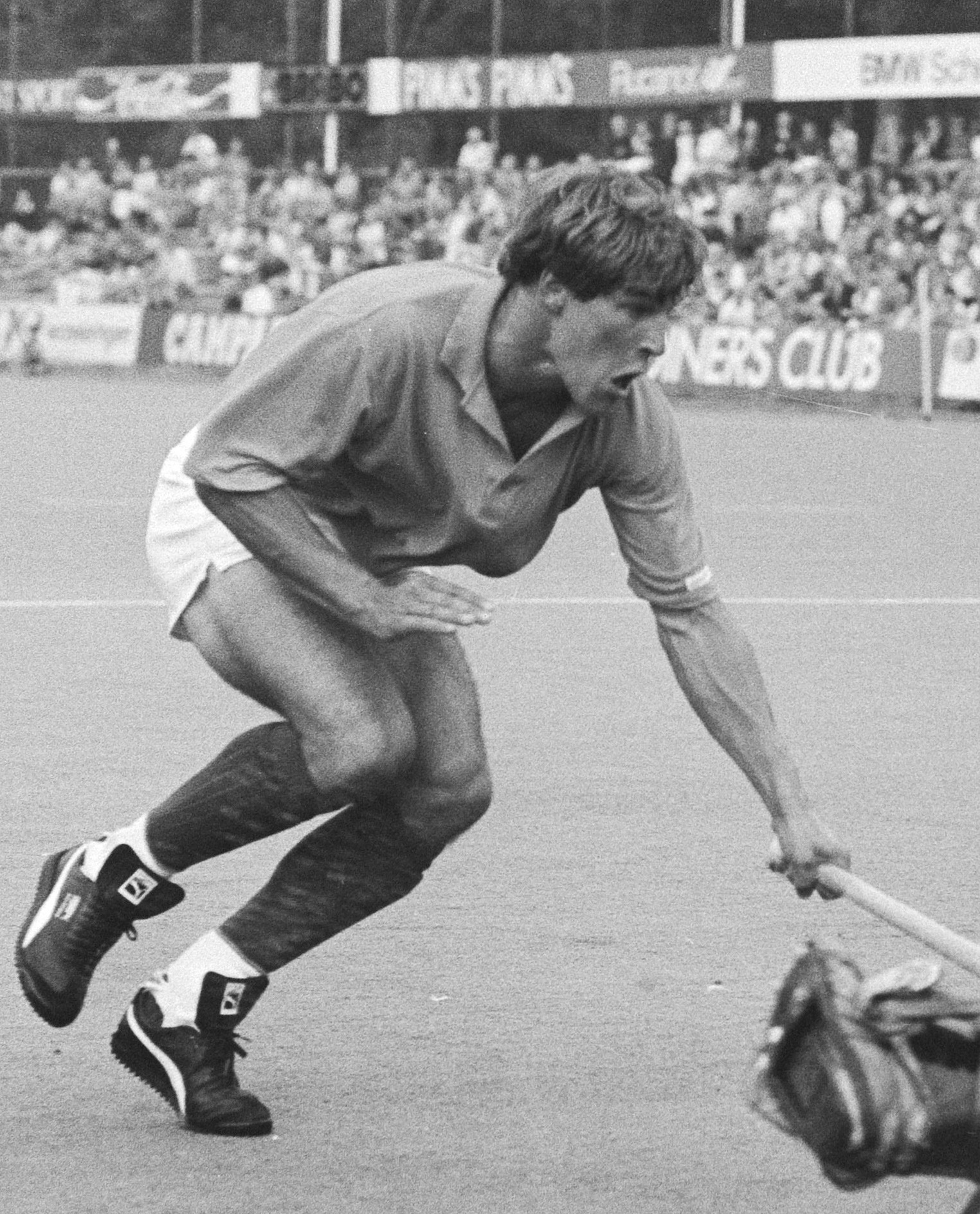
- Jan Hidde Kruize in 1983

Personal information
- Born: 30 September 1961 (age 64)
Medal record
Men's Field Hockey
Representing the Netherlands
Olympic Games
| Bronze medal – third place | 1988 Seoul | Team competition |
EuroHockey
| Gold medal – first place | 1983 Amsterdam | Team competition |

Jan Hidde Kruize (born 30 September 1961 in The Hague, South Holland) is a former field hockey player from The Netherlands, who participated in two Summer Olympics: in Los Angeles (1984) and in Seoul (1988). He ended up in sixth place in California with the Dutch National Men's Team, and won the bronze medal in South Korea, after defeating Australia (2–1) in the Bronze Medal Game.

Just like his brothers Ties and Hans, and his father Roepie, Kruize played club hockey for HC Klein Zwitserland from The Hague. The striker earned a total number of 95 caps, scoring 31 goals, in the years 1982–1990. He was part of the Dutch team that won the 1983 EuroHockey Nations Championship and scored 4 goals.
