= War of secession =

War of secession may refer to:

- War of independence, a military attempt by a rebel movement to have a territory break away (secede) from a sovereign state to form a new sovereign state in its own right
- American Civil War (1861–1865), see also names of the American Civil War
- Swedish War of Liberation (1521–1523), also known as the Swedish War of Secession or Gustav Vasa's Rebellion

== See also ==
- War of succession, a war prompted by a succession crisis in which two or more individuals claim the right of successor to a deceased or deposed monarch
