= 1979 EuroHockey Club Champions Cup =

The 1979 EuroHockey Club Champions Cup, taking place in The Hague, was the sixth edition of Europe's premier field hockey club competition. The format was changed - standings would be determined by a group stage in four triangular groups and subsequent play-offs.

It was won by HC Klein Zwitserland in their second participation, becoming the first Dutch team to win the competition in a final match against the Real Club de Polo from Barcelona.

== Group stage ==
=== Group A ===
1. (Scotland) Edinburgh HC
2. (England) Southgate HC
3. (Poland) Lech Poznań

=== Group B ===
1. (West Germany) Rüsselsheimer RK
2. (Czechoslovakia) Slavia Prague
3. (Switzerland) Basler HC 1911

=== Group C ===
1. (Netherlands) HC Klein Zwitserland
2. (England) Guildford HC
3. (France) Stade Français

=== Group D ===
1. (Spain) Real Club de Polo, Barcelona
2. (Belgium) Uccle Sport
3. (Soviet Union) Dynamo Almaty

== Play-offs - 1st knockout stage ==
=== 1st-4th place ===
- HC Klein Zwitserland 6-0 Edinburgh HC
- Real Club de Polo, Barcelona 1-1 Rüsselsheimer RK (penalty shoot-out: 5-3)

=== 5th-8th place ===
- Southgate HC 4-0 Guidford HC
- Slavia Prague 2-1 Uccle Sport

=== 9th-12th place ===
- Dynamo Almaty 3-0 Basler HC 1911
- Stade Français 2-1 Lech Poznań

== Play-offs - 2nd knockout stage ==
=== Final ===
- HC Klein Zwitserland 2-1 Real Club de Polo, Barcelona

=== 3rd place ===
- Rüsselsheimer RK 5-1 Edinburgh HC

=== 5th place ===
- Southgate HC 3-1 Slavia Prague

=== 7th place ===
- Uccle Sport 0-0 Guidford HC (penalty shoot-out: 4-2)

=== 9th place ===
- Dynamo Almaty 5-2 Stade Français

=== 11th place ===
- Basler HC 1911 3-0 Lech Poznań

== Standings ==
1. (Netherlands) HC Klein Zwitserland
2. (Spain) Real Club de Polo, Barcelona
3. (West Germany) Rüsselsheimer RK
4. (Scotland) Edinburgh HC
5. (England) Southgate HC (defending champions)
6. (Czechoslovakia) Slavia Prague
7. (Belgium) Uccle Sport
8. (England) Guildford HC
9. (Soviet Union) Dynamo Almaty
10. (France) Stade Français
11. (Switzerland) Basler HC 1911
12. (Poland) Lech Poznań
