= GITP International BV =

GITP (Gemeenschappelijk Instituut voor Toegepaste Psychologie) is a HRD consultancy firm, founded in 1947 in collaboration with the Nijmegen University and the Tilburg School of Economics (Netherlands). Founders were Professor Dr. Theo Rutten (Dutch Minister of Education in 1948–1952) and Professor Jan de Quay (Dutch Prime Minister in 1959–1963). Their objective was to contribute to economic restructuring of the Netherlands after World War II employing the most modern scientific insights, based on the philosophy that the right man or woman must be at the right job. A key contribution to achieve this came from the Marshall Plan, which provided funds.

Nowadays, GITP studies how people and organisations can function effectively in ever more complex and demanding social and business economy environments and provides solutions for good governance and healthy labor relations, lifelong learning and finding, retaining and developing talent. Assessments and training are core business of the company. It has clients in profit, non-profit and government sectors: Dutch midcap players who expand globally as well as international organizations who are looking for HR consultancy in the Netherlands.

== People ==
- Professor Dr. Theo Rutten
- Professor Jan de Quay
- Ron Steens
