= Jalaluddin Rizvi =

Indian field hockey player

Olympic medal record

Men's Field Hockey

Champions Trophy
Bronze medal – third place	1982 Amstelveen	

Syed Jalaluddin Rizvi is a former field hockey player who represented India in the 1984 Summer Olympics, Los Angeles USA. He is from Bhopal in the state of Madhya Pradesh. He played at the right wing position. He was awarded the Arjuna Award in 2000 for his achievements.

Other awards:

- Champions Trophy silver medalist
- Azalan shah gold medalist
- Vikram Award by Govt. of Madhya Pradesh
- Zainabia Award by Zainabia Trust India
