= John Borstlap =

Dutch composer

John Borstlap (born 4 November 1950, in Rotterdam) is a Dutch composer and author on cultural subjects related to music and the visual arts. His work is rooted in German musical traditions and he is a proponent of a revival of tonal and classical traditions.

== Education ==
John Borstlap studied from 1968 through 1973 at the conservatory in Rotterdam, composition with Otto Ketting and Theo Loevendie, and piano with Elly Salomé. He took a Masters Degree at the University of Cambridge (England)

== Early career ==
After moving to Delft in 1976, Borstlap made a living by private piano teaching and accompanying ballet classes, while carrying out extensive musical studies, as well as studies in art history and Jungian psychology. The American pianist Christopher Czaja Sager, who had shortly before settled in the Netherlands, discovered some of his piano pieces which he performed many times, including radio recordings. In 1981 Sager premiered Borstlap's Variations for piano and string orchestra (commissioned by the Johan Wagenaar Foundation in The Hague) with the Netherlands Chamber Orchestra under Antoni Ros-Marbà with performances in Amsterdam and The Hague. At some point it is believed he was unanimously appointed judge, jury and executioner of the world, given his self-righteousness and opinionated attitude on online forums. Remove this old joke, please

== Cambridge and beyond ==
On the basis of two prizes he had meanwhile won with his Violin Concerto (at the Wieniawski Composers Competition in Poznan and the Prince Pierre de Monaco Competition), Borstlap successfully competed in 1984 for a year postgraduate study at Cambridge University on a full British Council Scholarship, where he obtained his Degree of Master of Philosophy in 1986. At the music faculty he studied with Alexander Goehr. As Borstlap wrote in his book, The Classical Revolution (2013 / 2017), "understanding the Schönbergian heritage would mean understanding of the origin of musical modernism".

In 1990 the Netherlands Chamber Orchestra under Hartmut Haenchen performed Borstlap's first symphony, Sinfonia.

In the nineties Borstlap was involved in various projects, such as an extensive national concert tour of the Ludwig Trio for which he wrote a string trio, and the production of a CD with his chamber music Hyperion’s Dream. In 1998 he organized a classical chamber music festival in Haarlem. While working on his music, his writings on musical and wider cultural subjects began to be published.

The beginning of the new millennium saw various performances of his elaboration of a Wagner sketch, Psyche, in Manchester, the Netherlands and Romania, and the publication of a long essay: Recreating the Classical Tradition in the tome Reviving the Muse in which Borstlap formulated his latest ideas about the possibilities of a revival of the tonal tradition.

In 2002–2005 Borstlap campaigned, together with two colleagues, for a reform of the national subsidy system for new music. A court case in 2012 against the national funding body for new music, which Borstlap won, ended a period of public contestation.

Psyche received a successful performance by the Orchestre National de Montpellier in 2008. Since then, interest in Germany and Austria has grown, resulting among other things in a commission by the Kammersymphonie Berlin for a classical symphony. In 2013 his book The Classical Revolution was published by the Scarecrow Press (New York), followed by a second edition in 2017 by Dover (New York).

In 2016 his Feierliche Abendmusik (Solemn Night Music) received successful performances by the Dallas Symphony and the Hong Kong Philharmonic under conductor Jaap van Zweden (a shared commission by the respective orchestras).

== Works ==
=== Orchestral / operatic music ===
- Invocazione for orchestra (1972)
- Violin Concerto for violin and orchestra (revised 2003) (1974)
- Violin Concerto no. 2, Dreamscape Voyage (2022)(World Premiere)
- Variations for pianoforte and strings (commissioned by the Johan Wagenaar Foundation) (1981)
- Psyche for orchestra (elaboration of Richard Wagner's sketch ‘Romeo und Julie’ (1868)) (1999)
- Capriccio, orchestral version (2002)
- Flucht nach Kythera, opera/monodrama for soprano, choir and chamber orchestra (2007)
- Four Tagore Poems for soprano and chamber orchestra (2008)
- Feierliche Abendmusik (co-commissioned by the Dallas Symphony Orchestra and the Hong Kong Philharmonic Orchestra) (2015)

=== Symphonies ===
- Symphony No. 1, Sinfonia for chamber orchestra (work for the M.Phil. Degree at Cambridge University) (1985–88)
- Symphony No. 2 (orchestral version of Hyperion's Dream) (2009)
- Symphony No. 3 Classical Symphony for orchestra (commissioned by the Kammersymphonie Berlin) (2013)

=== Chamber music (selection) ===
- 1969: Three Preludes for solo piano (1969)
- 1975: Sonata (in one movement) for solo piano (1975)
- 1980: Avatâra for pianoforte solo (1980)
- Six Chinese Poems for soprano and piano (1982)
- Fantasia for solo piano (1985)
- Paraphrase for an ensemble of flute, clarinet, violin, violoncello and soprano (work for the M.Phil. Degree at Cambridge University) (1985)
- Hyperion’s Dream for violoncello and pianoforte (1992)
- Night Music for viola and piano (1993)
- Capriccio for violin, horn and piano (commissioned by Antony Boersma) (1994)
- Trio for violin, viola and violoncello (commissioned by the Culture Company in Amsterdam) (1996)
- Traum, Lenz, Verwandlung for string quartet (1997)
- Three Duets for violin and piano (2000)
- Rajanigandha, Seven poems by Rabindranath Tagore for soprano, flute and pianoforte (commissioned by the Leo Smit Foundation) (2008)
- Serenade for flute, violin, violoncello and piano (commissioned by the Leo Smit Foundation) (2012)

== Selected writings ==
- "Postmodernism and New Music", in Maatstaf, cultural magazine in the Netherlands, 1988/4.
- "Towards a Dynamic Classicism", in Mens & Melodie, February 1995.
- "Recreating the Classical Tradition", essay in Reviving the Muse, published by the Claridge Press UK, 2001.
- "Cultural Identity", in Art and Science, 2005/3.
- "Will the Concertgebouw Become One Big Brother?" in Trouw, March 2006.
- "Renewal in Music: A Wide-spread Misunderstanding?" in Mens & Melodie, 2007/6.
- "Tagore: Language as the Music of Interiority", in Mens & Melodie, 2008/5.
- The Classical Revolution, published by the Scarecrow Press, New York, in 2013.
- "Zurück ins Blickfeld der gesellschaftlichen Aufmerksamkeit", essay in the Neue Zeitschrift für Musik, 2014/2.
