= Tim Steens =

Field hockey player

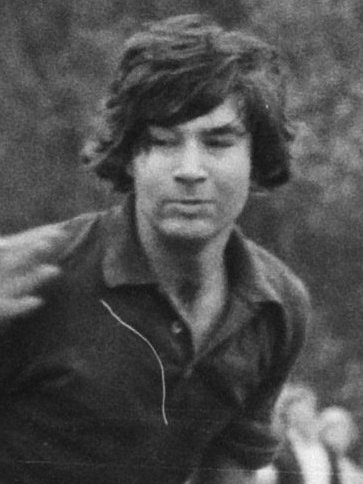

Personal information
- Born: 13 December 1955 (age 70) Rotterdam, the Nertherlands
- Height: 1.68 m (5 ft 6 in)
- Weight: 65 kg (143 lb)

Sport
- Sport: Field hockey
- Club: HCKZ, Den Haag
Medal record
Representing the Netherlands
Olympic Games
Bronze medal – third place	1988 Seoul	Team competition

Timotheus "Tim" Bernardus Steens (born 13 December 1955) is a retired Dutch field hockey player, who earned a total number of 162 caps, scoring 12 goals for the Netherlands national field hockey team in the 1970s and 1980s.

He played for the Dutch hockey team HC Klein Zwitserland. He was a member of the bronze medal-winning Dutch team at the 1988 Summer Olympics in Seoul. Steens is the younger brother of Dutch field hockey Olympian Ron Steens.
