= Rochus Westbroek =

Dutch field hockey player (born 1971)

Rochus Westbroek (born 7 August 1971) is a Dutch field hockey player.

He played for the Dutch hockey team HC Klein Zwitserland.
