= Ties Kruize =

Dutch field hockey player

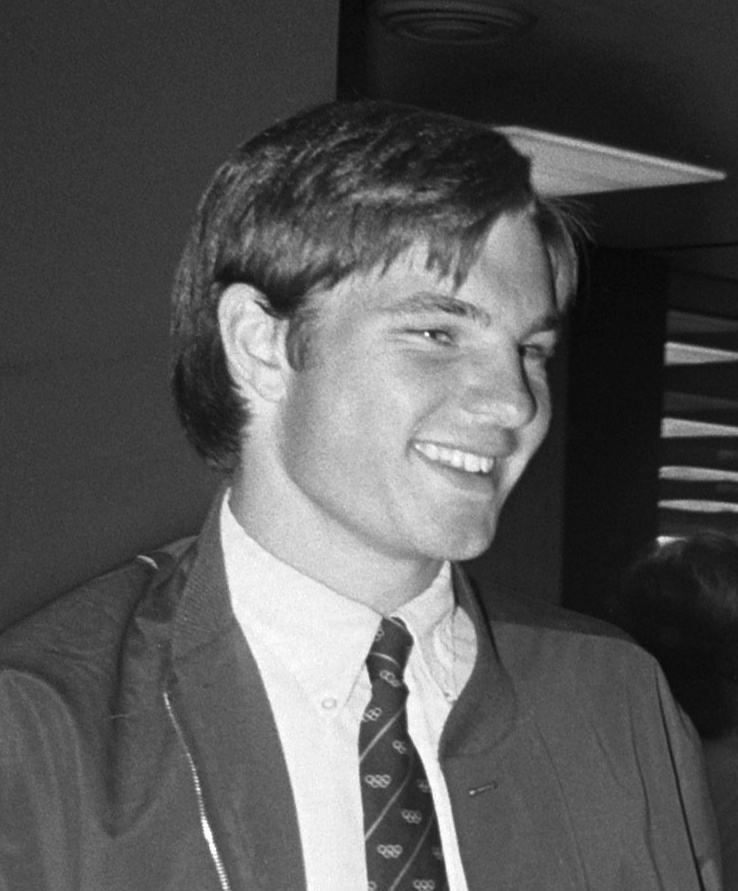
- Ties Kruize in 1972

Personal information
- Born: 17 November 1952 (age 73) The Hague, the Netherlands
- Height: 1.80 m (5 ft 11 in)
- Weight: 88 kg (194 lb)

Sport
- Sport: Field hockey
- Club: HHIJC, Den Haag; HCKZ, Den Haag
Medal record
Representing the Netherlands
Hockey World Cup
Gold medal – first place	1973 Amstelveen	Team
Silver medal – second place	1978 Buenos Aires	Team
EuroHockey Nations Championship
Bronze medal – third place	1974 Madrid	Team
Gold medal – first place	1983 Amsterdam	Team
Hockey Champions Trophy
Gold medal – first place	1981 Karachi	Team
Gold medal – first place	1982 Amstelveen	Team

Ties Kruize (born 17 November 1952) is a former field hockey player from the Netherlands. He competed at the 1972 and 1984 Olympic Games and finished in fourth and sixth place, respectively. He became world champion in 1973, European champion in 1983, and retired from international competition in 1986, after the Hockey World Cup in London.

Kruize played 202 international matches for the Netherlands, and scored a total number of 167 goals. He was famous for his penalty corner, just as his successor Floris Jan Bovelander was. His father Roepie Kruize also played for the Dutch national hockey team. Throughout his career Kruize played for HC Klein Zwitserland from The Hague. With his club he won eight Dutch titles in a row: from 1977 until 1984. Just like his brothers Hans and Hidde, and his father Roepie, the oldest of the Kruize brothers played club hockey for HC Klein Zwitserland from The Hague. His uncle Gerrit Kruize was also an Olympic field hockey player.

== Superstars ==
Kruize participated in the televised all-around sports competition Superstars, winning the European edition in 1977 and 1979.
