= Ron Steens =

Dutch field hockey player (1952–2024)

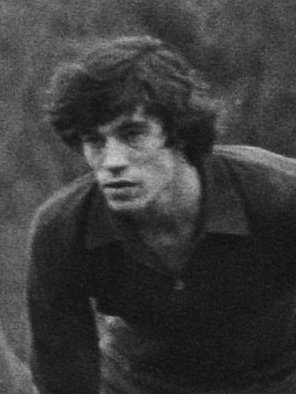
- Steens in 1976

Personal information
- Born: 18 June 1952 Rotterdam, Netherlands
- Died: 30 September 2024 (aged 72)
- Height: 1.84 m (6 ft 0 in)
- Weight: 80 kg (180 lb)

Sport
- Sport: Field hockey
- Club: HCKZ, Den Haag

Ronaldus Franciscus Johannes Steens (18 June 1952 – 30 September 2024) was a Dutch field hockey player, who was a member of the Dutch National Team that finished sixth in the 1984 Summer Olympics in Los Angeles, California. Eight years earlier, the midfielder was also on the Holland squad that ended up fourth at the 1976 Summer Olympics in Montreal.

Steens, a powerful midfield player who played club hockey for HC Klein Zwitserland, earned a total number of 166 caps—scoring 43 goals—in the years 1973–1985. He retired from international hockey a year before the 1986 Men's Hockey World Cup in London. His younger brother Tim was also a field hockey international for Holland.

After his professional career, Ron Steens worked as a HR consultant at GITP, a HRD consultancy firm founded in 1947 in collaboration with the Nijmegen University and the Tilburg School of Economics (Netherlands).

Steens died on 30 September 2024, at the age of 72.
