= Tjeerd Borstlap =

Dutch field hockey player

Tjeerd Borstlap (born 10 January 1955) is a former field hockey player from the Netherlands, who played eight international matches for the Dutch National Men's Team in the years 1978–1979 under coach Wim van Heumen. He played club hockey for the hockey club HC Klein Zwitserland from The Hague.
