= Hans Kruize =

Dutch field hockey player

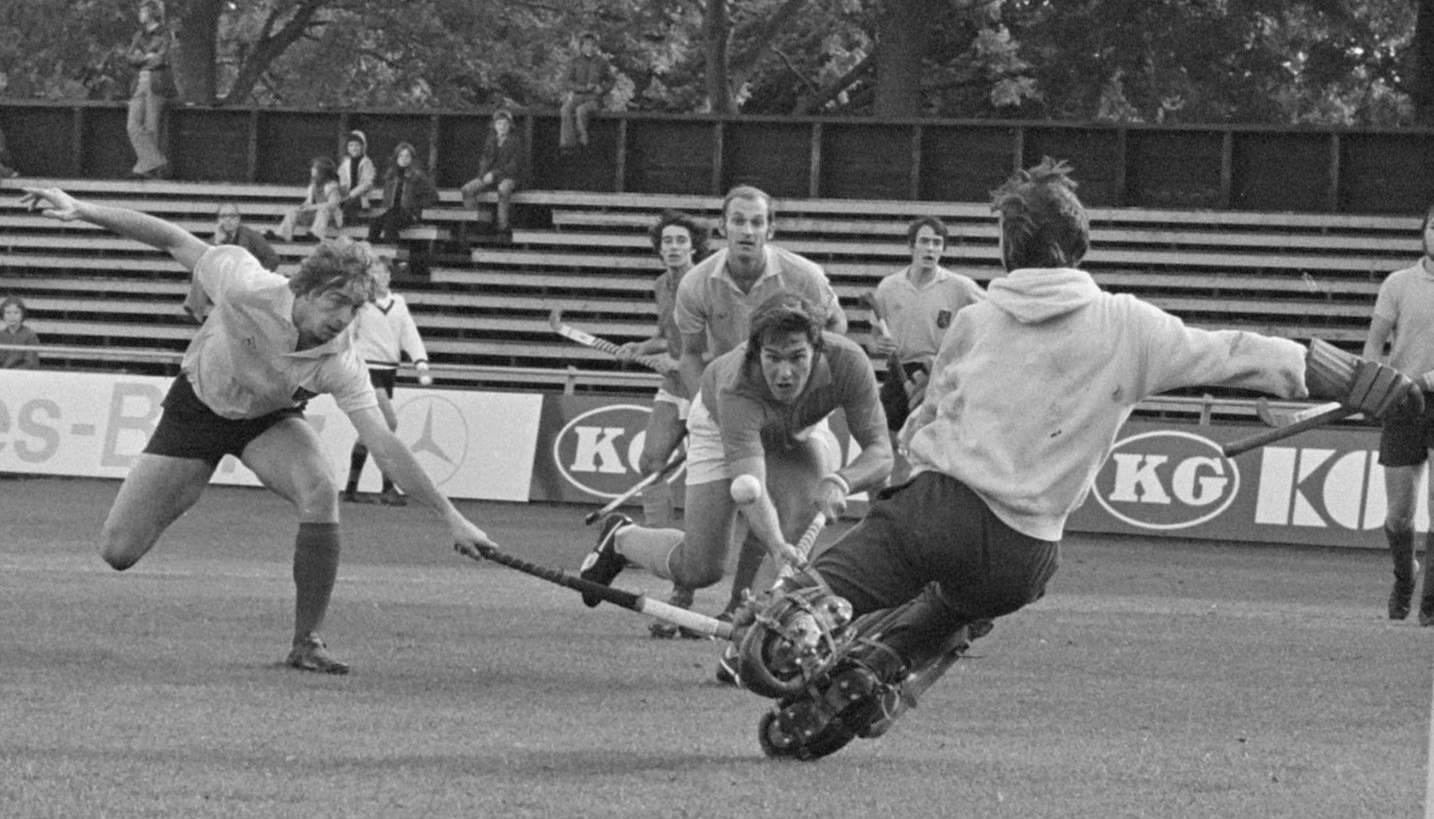
- Hans Kruize (center) is scoring a goal against Belgium in 1974

Personal information
- Born: 23 May 1954 (age 72) The Hague, the Netherlands
- Height: 1.79 m (5 ft 10 in)
- Weight: 91 kg (201 lb)

Sport
- Sport: Field hockey
- Club: HHIJC, Den Haag; HCKZ, Den Haag
Medal record
Representing the Netherlands
EuroHockey Nations Championship
Bronze medal – third place	1974 Madrid	Team

Hans Tjebbe Kruize (born 23 May 1954) is a former field hockey player from the Netherlands.

== Career ==
He participated in the 1976 and 1984 Olympic Games and ended up in fourth and in sixth place, respectively. Just like his brothers Ties and Hidde, and his father Roepie, he played club hockey for HC Klein Zwitserland from The Hague. The midfielder earned a total number of 99 caps, scoring fourteen goals, in the years 1974–1984. He won a European title in 1974.
