= Roepie Kruize =

Dutch field hockey player

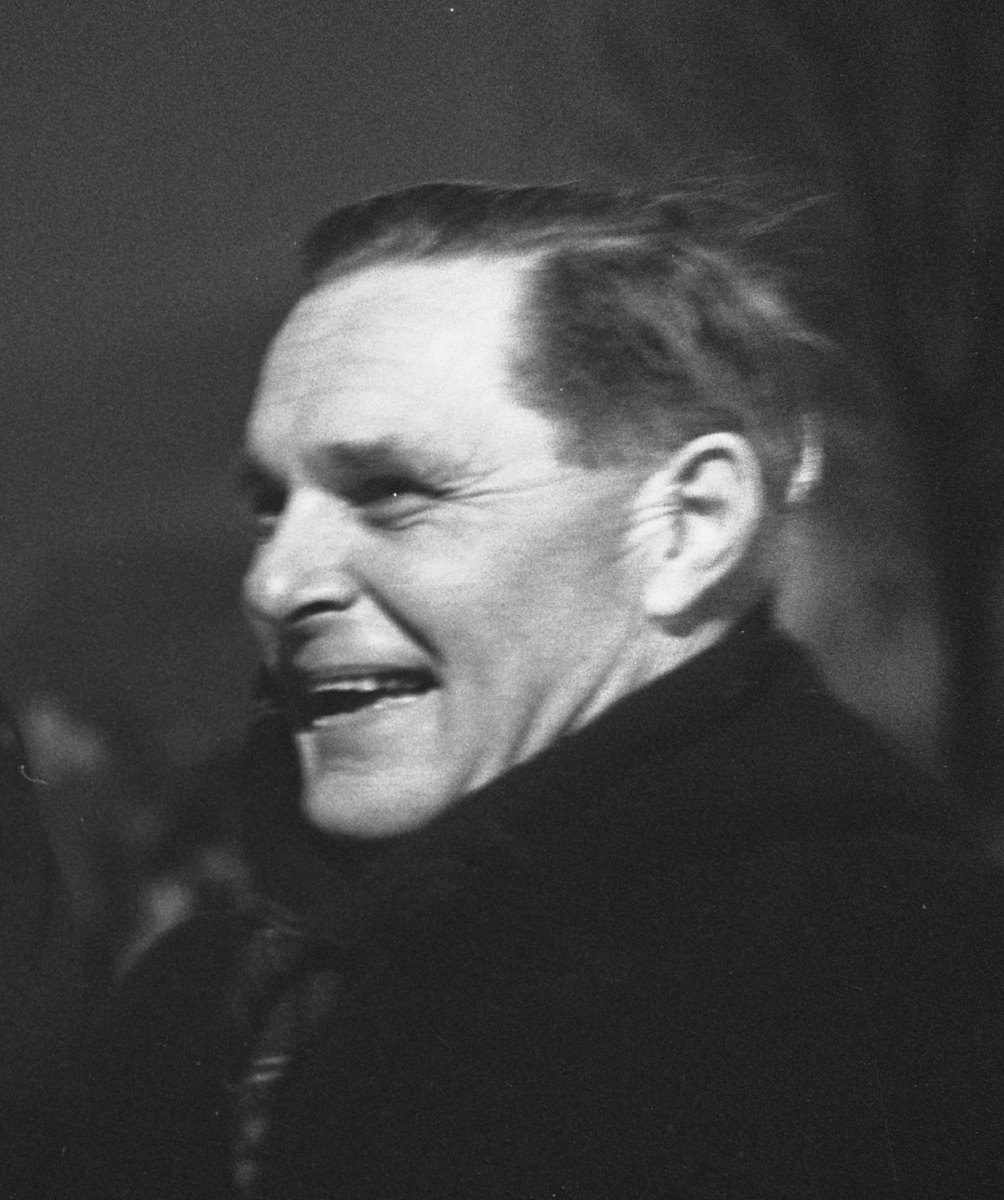
- Roepie Kruize in 1969

Medal record

Men's Field Hockey

Representing Netherlands
Bronze medal – third place	1948 London	Team competition
Silver medal – second place	1952 Helsinki	Team competition

Jan Hendrik "Roepie" Kruize (18 January 1925 in Heemstede – 14 February 1992 in The Hague) was a former field hockey player from the Netherlands. He was one of the Netherlands's most famous players in the years following World War II. Kruize won the bronze medal with the Dutch Men's Team at the 1948 Summer Olympics in London, followed by the silver medal, four years later in Helsinki.
