= List of 1984 Summer Olympics medal winners =

The 1984 Summer Olympics were held in Los Angeles, California from 28 July to 14 August 1984.

== Archery ==
=== Medal table ===
* Host nation (United States)

Rank	Nation	Gold	Silver	Bronze	Total
1	United States*	1	1	0	2
2	South Korea	1	0	1	2
3	China	0	1	0	1
4	Japan	0	0	1	1
Totals (4 entries)		2	2	2	6

=== Medalists ===
Event	Gold	Silver	Bronze
Men's	Darrell Pace; United States	Richard McKinney; United States	Hiroshi Yamamoto; Japan
Women's	Seo Hyang-soon; South Korea	Li Lingjuan; China	Kim Jin-ho; South Korea

== Athletics ==
=== Medal table ===
* Host nation (United States)

Rank	Nation	Gold	Silver	Bronze	Total
1	United States*	16	15	9	40
2	West Germany	4	2	5	11
3	Great Britain	3	7	6	16
4	Romania	3	3	4	10
5	Italy	3	1	3	7
6	Finland	2	1	1	4
7	Mexico	2	1	0	3
8	Morocco	2	0	0	2
9	France	1	1	2	4
10	Australia	1	1	1	3
11	Portugal	1	0	2	3
12	Kenya	1	0	1	2
13	Brazil	1	0	0	1
13	Netherlands	1	0	0	1
15	Canada	0	2	3	5
16	Sweden	0	2	1	3
17	Jamaica	0	1	2	3
18	Ireland	0	1	0	1
18	Ivory Coast	0	1	0	1
18	Norway	0	1	0	1
18	Switzerland	0	1	0	1
22	China	0	0	1	1
22	Nigeria	0	0	1	1
22	Spain	0	0	1	1
Totals (24 entries)		41	41	43	125

=== Men's events ===
Event	Gold		Silver		Bronze	
100 metres	Carl Lewis; United States	9.99	Sam Graddy; United States	10.19	Ben Johnson; Canada	10.22
200 metres	Carl Lewis; United States	19.80 OR	Kirk Baptiste; United States	19.96	Thomas Jefferson; United States	20.26
400 metres	Alonzo Babers; United States	44.27	Gabriel Tiacoh; Ivory Coast	44.54	Antonio McKay; United States	44.71
800 metres	Joaquim Cruz; Brazil	1:43.00 OR	Sebastian Coe; Great Britain	1:43.64	Earl Jones; United States	1:43.83
1500 metres	Sebastian Coe; Great Britain	3:32.53 OR	Steve Cram; Great Britain	3:33.40	José Manuel Abascal; Spain	3:34.30
5000 metres	Saïd Aouita; Morocco	13:05.59 OR	Markus Ryffel; Switzerland	13:07.54	António Leitão; Portugal	13:09.20
10,000 metres	Alberto Cova; Italy	27:47.54	Mike McLeod; Great Britain	28:06.22	Michael Musyoki; Kenya	28:06.46
110 metres hurdles	Roger Kingdom; United States	13.20 OR	Greg Foster; United States	13.23	Arto Bryggare; Finland	13.40
400 metres hurdles	Edwin Moses; United States	47.75	Danny Harris; United States	48.13	Harald Schmid; West Germany	48.19
3000 metres steeplechase	Julius Korir; Kenya	8:11.80	Joseph Mahmoud; France	8:13.31	Brian Diemer; United States	8:14.06
4 × 100 metres relay	United States; Sam Graddy; Ron Brown; Calvin Smith; Carl Lewis	37.83 WR	Jamaica; Al Lawrence; Greg Meghoo; Don Quarrie; Ray Stewart; Norman Edwards*	38.62	Canada; Ben Johnson; Tony Sharpe; Desai Williams; Sterling Hinds	38.70
4 × 400 metres relay	United States; Sunder Nix; Ray Armstead; Alonzo Babers; Antonio McKay; Walter McCoy*; Willie Smith*	2:57.91	Great Britain; Kriss Akabusi; Garry Cook; Todd Bennett; Phil Brown	2:59.13	Nigeria; Sunday Uti; Moses Ugbusien; Rotimi Peters; Innocent Egbunike	2:59.32
Marathon	Carlos Lopes; Portugal	2:09:21 OR	John Treacy; Ireland	2:09:56	Charlie Spedding; Great Britain	2:09:58
20 kilometres walk	Ernesto Canto; Mexico	1:23:13 OR	Raúl González; Mexico	1:23:20	Maurizio Damilano; Italy	1:23:26
50 kilometres walk	Raúl González; Mexico	3:47:26 OR	Bo Gustafsson; Sweden	3:53:19	Sandro Bellucci; Italy	3:53:45
High jump	Dietmar Mögenburg; West Germany	2.35 m	Patrik Sjöberg; Sweden	2.33 m	Zhu Jianhua; China	2.31 m
Pole vault	Pierre Quinon; France	5.75 m	Mike Tully; United States	5.65 m	Earl Bell; United States	5.60 m
Pole vault	Pierre Quinon; France	5.75 m	Mike Tully; United States	5.65 m	Thierry Vigneron; France	5.60 m
Long jump	Carl Lewis; United States	8.54 m	Gary Honey; Australia	8.24 m	Giovanni Evangelisti; Italy	8.24 m
Triple jump	Al Joyner; United States	17.26 m	Mike Conley; United States	17.18 m	Keith Connor; Great Britain	16.87 m
Shot put	Alessandro Andrei; Italy	21.26 m	Michael Carter; United States	21.09 m	Dave Laut; United States	20.97 m
Discus throw	Rolf Danneberg; West Germany	66.60 m	Mac Wilkins; United States	66.30 m	John Powell; United States	65.46 m
Hammer throw	Juha Tiainen; Finland	78.08 m	Karl-Hans Riehm; West Germany	77.98 m	Klaus Ploghaus; West Germany	76.68 m
Javelin throw	Arto Härkönen; Finland	86.76 m	David Ottley; Great Britain	85.74 m	Kenth Eldebrink; Sweden	83.72 m
Decathlon	Daley Thompson; Great Britain	8798 EWR	Jürgen Hingsen; West Germany	8673	Siegfried Wentz; West Germany	8412

=== Women's events ===
Games	Gold		Silver		Bronze	
100 metres	Evelyn Ashford; United States	10.97 OR	Alice Brown; United States	11.13	Merlene Ottey; Jamaica	11.16
200 metres	Valerie Brisco-Hooks; United States	21.81 OR	Florence Griffith; United States	22.04	Merlene Ottey; Jamaica	22.09
400 metres	Valerie Brisco-Hooks; United States	48.83 OR	Chandra Cheeseborough; United States	49.05	Kathy Smallwood-Cook; Great Britain	49.42
800 metres	Doina Melinte; Romania	1:57.60	Kim Gallagher; United States	1:58.63	Fița Lovin; Romania	1:58.83
1500 metres	Gabriella Dorio; Italy	4:03.25	Doina Melinte; Romania	4:03.76	Maricica Puică; Romania	4:04.15
3000 metres	Maricica Puică; Romania	8:35.96 OR	Wendy Sly; Great Britain	8:39.47	Lynn Williams; Canada	8:42.14
100 metres hurdles	Benita Fitzgerald; United States	12.84	Shirley Strong; Great Britain	12.88	Michèle Chardonnet; France	13.06
100 metres hurdles	Benita Fitzgerald; United States	12.84	Shirley Strong; Great Britain	12.88	Kim Turner; United States	13.06
400 metres hurdles	Nawal El Moutawakel; Morocco	54.61 OR	Judi Brown; United States	55.20	Cristieana Cojocaru; Romania	55.41
4 × 100 metres relay	United States; Alice Brown; Jeanette Bolden; Chandra Cheeseborough; Evelyn Ashford	41.65	Canada; Angela Bailey; Marita Payne; Angella Taylor-Issajenko; France Gareau	42.77	Great Britain; Simmone Jacobs; Kathy Smallwood-Cook; Beverley Goddard; Heather Hunte	43.11
4 × 400 metres relay	United States; Lillie Leatherwood; Sherri Howard; Valerie Brisco-Hooks; Chandra Cheeseborough; Diane Dixon*; Denean Howard*	3:18.29 OR	Canada; Charmaine Crooks; Jillian Richardson; Molly Killingbeck; Marita Payne; Dana Wright*	3:21.21	West Germany; Heike Schulte-Mattler; Ute Thimm; Heidi-Elke Gaugel; Gaby Bußmann; Nicole Leistenschneider*; Christina Sussiek*	3:22.98
Marathon	Joan Benoit; United States	2:24:52 OR	Grete Waitz; Norway	2:26:18	Rosa Mota; Portugal	2:26:57
High jump	Ulrike Meyfarth; West Germany	2.02 m OR	Sara Simeoni; Italy	2.00 m	Joni Huntley; United States	1.97 m
Long jump	Anișoara Cușmir-Stanciu; Romania	6.96 m	Vali Ionescu; Romania	6.81 m	Sue Hearnshaw; Great Britain	6.80 m
Shot put	Claudia Losch; West Germany	20.48 m	Mihaela Loghin; Romania	20.47 m	Gael Martin; Australia	19.19 m
Discus throw	Ria Stalman; Netherlands	65.36 m	Leslie Deniz; United States	64.86 m	Florența Crăciunescu; Romania	63.64 m
Javelin throw	Tessa Sanderson; Great Britain	69.56 m OR	Tiina Lillak; Finland	69.00 m	Fatima Whitbread; Great Britain	67.14 m
Heptathlon	Glynis Nunn; Australia	6390 OR	Jackie Joyner; United States	6385	Sabine Everts; West Germany	6363

- * Athletes who ran in preliminary round and also received medals.

== Basketball ==
=== Medal table ===
* Host nation (United States)

Rank	NOC	Gold	Silver	Bronze	Total
1	United States*	2	0	0	2
2	South Korea	0	1	0	1
2	Spain	0	1	0	1
4	China	0	0	1	1
4	Yugoslavia	0	0	1	1
Totals (5 entries)		2	2	2	6

=== Medalists ===
Event	Gold	Silver	Bronze
Men	United States; Steve Alford; Leon Wood; Patrick Ewing; Vernon Fleming; Alvin Robertson; Michael Jordan; Joe Kleine; Jon Koncak; Wayman Tisdale; Chris Mullin; Sam Perkins; Jeff Turner	Spain; José Manuel Beirán; José Luis Llorente; Fernando Arcega; Josep Maria Margall; Andrés Jiménez; Fernando Romay; Fernando Martín; Juan Antonio Corbalán; Ignacio Solozábal; Juan Domingo de la Cruz; Juan Manuel López Iturriaga; Juan Antonio San Epifanio, "Epi"	Yugoslavia; Dražen Petrović; Aleksandar Petrović; Rajko Žižić; Andro Knego; Nebojša Zorkić; Ivan Sunara; Sabit Hadžić; Dražen Dalipagić; Emir Mutapčić; Ratko Radovanović; Mihovil Nakić; Branko Vukićević
Women	United States; Teresa Edwards; Lea Henry; Lynette Woodard; Anne Donovan; Cathy Boswell; Cheryl Miller; Janice Lawrence; Cindy Noble; Kim Mulkey; Denise Curry; Pam McGee; Carol Menken-Schaudt	South Korea; Choi Aei-young; Kim Eun-sook; Lee Hyung-sook; Choi Kyung-hee; Lee Mi-ja; Moon Kyung-ja; Kim Hwa-soon; Jeong Myung-hee; Kim Young-hee; Sung Jung-a; Park Chan-sook; Park Yang-gae	China; Chen Yuefang; Li Xiaoqin; Ba Yan; Song Xiaobo; Qiu Chen; Wang Jun; Xiu Lijuan; Zheng Haixia; Cong Xuedi; Zhang Hui; Liu Qing; Zhang Yueqin

== Boxing ==
=== Medal table ===
* Host nation (United States)

Rank	Nation	Gold	Silver	Bronze	Total
1	United States*	9	1	1	11
2	Italy	1	2	2	5
3	Yugoslavia	1	1	2	4
4	South Korea	1	1	1	3
5	Canada	0	2	1	3
6	Puerto Rico	0	1	1	2
7	Mexico	0	1	0	1
7	New Zealand	0	1	0	1
7	Nigeria	0	1	0	1
7	Thailand	0	1	0	1
11	Algeria	0	0	2	2
11	Turkey	0	0	2	2
11	Venezuela	0	0	2	2
14	Cameroon	0	0	1	1
14	Dominican Republic	0	0	1	1
14	Finland	0	0	1	1
14	France	0	0	1	1
14	Great Britain	0	0	1	1
14	Kenya	0	0	1	1
14	Netherlands	0	0	1	1
14	Romania	0	0	1	1
14	West Germany	0	0	1	1
14	Zambia	0	0	1	1
Totals (23 entries)		12	12	24	48

=== Medalists ===
Event	Gold	Silver	Bronze
Light flyweight (–48 kg)	Paul Gonzales; United States	Salvatore Todisco; Italy	Marcelino Bolivar; Venezuela
Light flyweight (–48 kg)	Paul Gonzales; United States	Salvatore Todisco; Italy	Keith Mwila; Zambia
Flyweight (–51 kg)	Steve McCrory; United States	Redžep Redžepovski; Yugoslavia	Eyüp Can; Turkey
Flyweight (–51 kg)	Steve McCrory; United States	Redžep Redžepovski; Yugoslavia	Ibrahim Bilali; Kenya
Bantamweight (–54 kg)	Maurizio Stecca; Italy	Héctor López; Mexico	Dale Walters; Canada
Bantamweight (–54 kg)	Maurizio Stecca; Italy	Héctor López; Mexico	Pedro Nolasco; Dominican Republic
Featherweight (–57 kg)	Meldrick Taylor; United States	Peter Konyegwachie; Nigeria	Omar Catarí; Venezuela
Featherweight (–57 kg)	Meldrick Taylor; United States	Peter Konyegwachie; Nigeria	Turgut Aykaç; Turkey
Lightweight (–60 kg)	Pernell Whitaker; United States	Luis Ortiz; Puerto Rico	Chun Chil-Sung; South Korea
Lightweight (–60 kg)	Pernell Whitaker; United States	Luis Ortiz; Puerto Rico	Martin Ndongo-Ebanga; Cameroon
Light welterweight (–63 kg)	Jerry Page; United States	Dhawee Umponmaha; Thailand	Mircea Fulger; Romania
Light welterweight (–63 kg)	Jerry Page; United States	Dhawee Umponmaha; Thailand	Mirko Puzović; Yugoslavia
Welterweight (–67 kg)	Mark Breland; United States	An Young-Su; South Korea	Joni Nyman; Finland
Welterweight (–67 kg)	Mark Breland; United States	An Young-Su; South Korea	Luciano Bruno; Italy
Light middleweight (–71 kg)	Frank Tate; United States	Shawn O'Sullivan; Canada	Christophe Tiozzo; France
Light middleweight (–71 kg)	Frank Tate; United States	Shawn O'Sullivan; Canada	Manfred Zielonka; West Germany
Middleweight (–75 kg)	Shin Joon-Sup; South Korea	Virgil Hill; United States	Aristides González; Puerto Rico
Middleweight (–75 kg)	Shin Joon-Sup; South Korea	Virgil Hill; United States	Mohamed Zaoui; Algeria
Light heavyweight (–81 kg)	Anton Josipović; Yugoslavia	Kevin Barry; New Zealand	Evander Holyfield; United States
Light heavyweight (–81 kg)	Anton Josipović; Yugoslavia	Kevin Barry; New Zealand	Mustapha Moussa; Algeria
Heavyweight (–91 kg)	Henry Tillman; United States	Willie DeWit; Canada	Angelo Musone; Italy
Heavyweight (–91 kg)	Henry Tillman; United States	Willie DeWit; Canada	Arnold Vanderlyde; Netherlands
Super heavyweight (+ 91 kg)	Tyrell Biggs; United States	Francesco Damiani; Italy	Robert Wells; Great Britain
Super heavyweight (+ 91 kg)	Tyrell Biggs; United States	Francesco Damiani; Italy	Aziz Salihu; Yugoslavia

== Canoeing ==
=== Medal table ===
* Host nation (United States)

Rank	Nation	Gold	Silver	Bronze	Total
1	New Zealand	4	0	0	4
2	Sweden	2	4	0	6
3	Canada	2	2	2	6
4	Romania	2	1	1	4
5	Yugoslavia	1	2	0	3
6	West Germany	1	1	1	3
7	France	0	1	3	4
8	Denmark	0	1	1	2
9	Australia	0	0	1	1
9	Netherlands	0	0	1	1
9	Spain	0	0	1	1
9	United States*	0	0	1	1
Totals (12 entries)		12	12	12	36

=== Men's events ===
Games	Gold	Silver	Bronze
C-1 500 metres	Larry Cain; Canada	Henning Lynge Jakobsen; Denmark	Costică Olaru; Romania
C-1 1000 metres	Ulrich Eicke; West Germany	Larry Cain; Canada	Henning Lynge Jakobsen; Denmark
C-2 500 metres	Yugoslavia; Matija Ljubek; Mirko Nišović	Romania; Ivan Patzaichin; Toma Simionov	Spain; Enrique Míguez; Narcisco Suárez
C-2 1000 metres	Romania; Ivan Patzaichin; Toma Simionov	Yugoslavia; Matija Ljubek; Mirko Nišović	France; Didier Hoyer; Eric Renaud
K-1 500 metres	Ian Ferguson; New Zealand	Lars-Erik Moberg; Sweden	Bernard Brégeon; France
K-1 1000 metres	Alan Thompson; New Zealand	Milan Janić; Yugoslavia	Greg Barton; United States
K-2 500 metres	New Zealand; Ian Ferguson; Paul MacDonald	Sweden; Per-Inge Bengtsson; Lars-Erik Moberg	Canada; Hugh Fisher; Alwyn Morris
K-2 1000 metres	Canada; Hugh Fisher; Alwyn Morris	France; Bernard Brégeon; Patrick Lefoulon	Australia; Barry Kelly; Grant Kenny
K-4 1000 metres	New Zealand; Grant Bramwell; Ian Ferguson; Paul MacDonald; Alan Thompson	Sweden; Per-Inge Bengtsson; Tommy Karls; Lars-Erik Moberg; Thomas Ohlsson	France; François Barouh; Philippe Boccara; Pascal Boucherit; Didier Vavasseur

=== Women's events ===
Games	Gold	Silver	Bronze
K-1 500 metres	Agneta Andersson; Sweden	Barbara Schüttpelz; West Germany	Annemiek Derckx; Netherlands
K-2 500 metres	Sweden; Agneta Andersson; Anna Olsson	Canada; Alexandra Barre; Susan Holloway	West Germany; Josefa Idem; Barbara Schüttpelz
K-4 500 metres	Romania; Agafia Constantin; Nastasia Ionescu; Tecla Marinescu; Maria Ştefan	Sweden; Agneta Andersson; Anna Olsson; Eva Karlsson; Susanne Wiberg	Canada; Alexandra Barre; Lucie Guay; Susan Holloway; Barbara Olmsted

== Cycling ==
=== Medal table ===
* Host nation (United States)

Rank	Nation	Gold	Silver	Bronze	Total
1	United States*	4	3	2	9
2	West Germany	1	2	2	5
3	Australia	1	0	0	1
3	Belgium	1	0	0	1
3	Italy	1	0	0	1
6	Canada	0	2	0	2
7	Switzerland	0	1	0	1
8	France	0	0	1	1
8	Japan	0	0	1	1
8	Mexico	0	0	1	1
8	Norway	0	0	1	1
Totals (11 entries)		8	8	8	24

=== Road cycling ===
==== Men’s events ====
Games	Gold	Silver	Bronze
Road race	Alexi Grewal; United States	Steve Bauer; Canada	Dag Otto Lauritzen; Norway
Team time trial	Italy; Marcello Bartalini; Marco Giovannetti; Eros Poli; Claudio Vandelli	Switzerland; Alfred Achermann; Richard Trinkler; Laurent Vial; Benno Wiss	United States; Ron Kiefel; Clarence Knickman; Davis Phinney; Andrew Weaver

==== Women’s events ====
Games	Gold	Silver	Bronze
Road race	Connie Carpenter; United States	Rebecca Twigg; United States	Sandra Schumacher; West Germany

=== Track cycling ===
Games	Gold	Silver	Bronze
Points race	Roger Ilegems; Belgium	Uwe Messerschmidt; West Germany	José Youshimatz; Mexico
Individual pursuit	Steve Hegg; United States	Rolf Gölz; West Germany	Leonard Nitz; United States
Team pursuit	Australia; Michael Grenda; Kevin Nichols; Michael Turtur; Dean Woods	United States; David Grylls; Steve Hegg; Patrick McDonough; Leonard Nitz; Brent Emery	West Germany; Reinhard Alber; Rolf Gölz; Roland Günther; Michael Marx
Sprint	Mark Gorski; United States	Nelson Vails; United States	Tsutomu Sakamoto; Japan
1 km time trial	Fredy Schmidtke; West Germany	Curt Harnett; Canada	Fabrice Colas; France

== Diving ==
=== Medal table ===
* Host nation (United States)

Rank	Nation	Gold	Silver	Bronze	Total
1	United States*	2	3	3	8
2	China	1	1	1	3
3	Canada	1	0	0	1
Totals (3 entries)		4	4	4	12

=== Men's events ===
Event	Gold	Silver	Bronze
3 m springboard	Greg Louganis; United States	Tan Liangde; China	Ronald Merriott; United States
10 m platform	Greg Louganis; United States	Bruce Kimball; United States	Li Kongzheng; China

=== Women's events ===
Event	Gold	Silver	Bronze
3 m springboard	Sylvie Bernier; Canada	Kelly McCormick; United States	Christina Seufert; United States
10 m platform	Zhou Jihong; China	Michele Mitchell; United States	Wendy Wyland; United States

== Equestrian events ==
=== Medal table ===
* Host nation (United States)

Rank	Nation	Gold	Silver	Bronze	Total
1	United States*	3	2	0	5
2	West Germany	2	0	2	4
3	New Zealand	1	0	0	1
4	Great Britain	0	2	1	3
5	Switzerland	0	1	2	3
6	Denmark	0	1	0	1
7	Sweden	0	0	1	1
Totals (7 entries)		6	6	6	18

=== Medalists ===
Games	Gold	Silver	Bronze
Individual dressage	Reiner Klimke and Ahlerich (FRG)	Anne Grethe Jensen and Marzog (DEN)	Otto Hofer and Limandus (SUI)
Team dressage	West Germany; Reiner Klimke and Ahlerich; Uwe Sauer and Montevideo; Herbert Krug and Muscadeur	Switzerland; Otto Hofer and Limandus; Christine Stückelberger and Tansanit; Amy-Cathérine de Bary and Aintree	Sweden; Ulla Håkansson and Flamingo; Louise Nathhorst and Inferno; Ingamay Bylund and Aleks
Individual eventing	Mark Todd and Charisma (NZL)	Karen Stives and Ben Arthur (USA)	Virginia Holgate and Priceless (GBR)
Team eventing	United States; Michael Plumb and Blue Stone; Karen Stives and Ben Arthur; Torrance Fleischmann and Finvarra; Bruce Davidson and JJ Babu	Great Britain; Virginia Leng and Priceless; Ian Stark and Oxford Blue; Diana Clapham and Windjammer; Lucinda Green and Regal Realm	West Germany; Bettina Overesch and Peacetime; Burkhard Tesdorpf and Freedom; Claus Erhorn and Fair Lady; Dietmar Hogrefe and Foliant
Individual jumping	Joseph Fargis and Touch of Class (USA)	Conrad Homfeld and Abdullah (USA)	Heidi Robbiani and Jessica V (SUI)
Team jumping	United States; Joseph Fargis and Touch of Class; Conrad Homfeld and Abdullah; Leslie Howard and Albany; Melanie Smith and Calypso	Great Britain; Michael Whitaker and Overton Amanda; John Whitaker and Ryan's Son; Steven Smith and Shining Example; Timothy Grubb and Linky	West Germany; Paul Schockemöhle and Deister; Peter Luther and Livius; Franke Sloothaak and Farmer; Fritz Ligges and Ramzes

== Fencing ==
=== Medal table ===
* Host nation (United States)

Rank	Nation	Gold	Silver	Bronze	Total
1	Italy	3	1	3	7
2	West Germany	2	3	0	5
3	France	2	2	3	7
4	China	1	0	0	1
5	Romania	0	1	1	2
6	Sweden	0	1	0	1
7	United States*	0	0	1	1
Totals (7 entries)		8	8	8	24

=== Men's events ===
Games	Gold	Silver	Bronze
Individual épée	Philippe Boisse; France	Björne Väggö; Sweden	Philippe Riboud; France
Team épée	West Germany; Elmar Borrmann; Volker Fischer; Gerhard Heer; Rafael Nickel; Alexander Pusch	France; Philippe Boisse; Jean-Michel Henry; Olivier Lenglet; Philippe Riboud; Michel Salesse	Italy; Stefano Bellone; Sandro Cuomo; Cosimo Ferro; Roberto Manzi; Angelo Mazzoni
Individual foil	Mauro Numa; Italy	Matthias Behr; West Germany	Stefano Cerioni; Italy
Team foil	Italy; Mauro Numa; Andrea Borella; Stefano Cerioni; Angelo Scuri; Andrea Cipressa	West Germany; Matthias Behr; Matthias Gey; Harald Hein; Frank Beck; Klaus Reichert	France; Philippe Omnès; Patrick Groc; Frédéric Pietruszka; Pascal Jolyot; Marc Cerboni
Individual sabre	Jean-François Lamour; France	Marco Marin; Italy	Peter Westbrook; United States
Team sabre	Italy; Marco Marin; Gianfranco Dalla Barba; Giovanni Scalzo; Ferdinando Meglio; Angelo Arcidiacono	France; Jean-François Lamour; Pierre Guichot; Hervé Granger-Veyron; Philippe Delrieu; Franck Ducheix	Romania; Marin Mustață; Ioan Pop; Alexandru Chiculiță; Cornel Marin; Vilmoș Szabo

=== Women's events ===
Games	Gold	Silver	Bronze
Individual foil	Luan Jujie; China	Cornelia Hanisch; West Germany	Dorina Vaccaroni; Italy
Team foil	West Germany; Ute Kircheis-Wessel; Christiane Weber; Cornelia Hanisch; Sabine Bischoff; Zita Funkenhauser	Romania; Aurora Dan; Monika Weber-Koszto; Rozalia Oros; Marcela Moldovan-Zsak; Elisabeta Guzganu-Tufan	France; Laurence Modaine; Pascale Trinquet-Hachin; Brigitte Latrille-Gaudin; Véronique Brouquier; Anne Meygret

== Field hockey ==
=== Medal table ===
* Host nation (United States)

Rank	Nation	Gold	Silver	Bronze	Total
1	Netherlands	1	0	0	1
1	Pakistan	1	0	0	1
3	West Germany	0	2	0	2
4	Great Britain	0	0	1	1
4	United States*	0	0	1	1
Totals (5 entries)		2	2	2	6

=== Medalists ===
Event	Gold	Silver	Bronze
Men's	Pakistan; Syed Ghulam Moinuddin; Qasim Zia; Nasir Ali; Abdul Rashid Al-Hasan; Ayaz Mahmood; Naeem Akhtar; Kalimullah Khan; Manzoor Hussain; Hassan Sardar; Hanif Khan; Khalid Hamid; Shahid Ali Khan; Tauqeer Dar; Ishtiaq Ahmed; Saleem Sherwani; Mushtaq Ahmad	West Germany; Christian Bassemir; Stefan Blöcher; Dirk Brinkmann; Heiner Dopp; Carsten Fischer; Tobias Frank; Volker Fried; Thomas Gunst; Horst-Ulrich Hänel; Karl-Joachim Hürter; Andreas Keller; Reinhard Krull; Michael Peter; Thomas Reck; Ekkhard Schmidt-Opper; Markku Slawyk	Great Britain; Paul Barber; Stephen Batchelor; Kulbir Bhaura; Robert Cattrall; Richard Dodds; James Duthie; Norman Hughes; Sean Kerly; Richard Leman; Stephen Martin; Billy McConnell; Veryan Pappin; Jon Potter; Mark Precious; Ian Taylor; David Westcott
Women's	Netherlands; Carina Benninga; Fieke Boekhorst; Marjolein Eijsvogel; Det de Beus; Irene Hendriks; Elsemiek Hillen; Sandra Le Poole; Anneloes Nieuwenhuizen; Martine Ohr; Alette Pos; Lisette Sevens; Marieke van Doorn; Aletta van Manen; Sophie von Weiler; Laurien Willemse; Margriet Zegers	West Germany; Gabriele Appel; Dagmar Breiken; Beate Deininger; Elke Drüll; Birgit Hagen; Birgit Hahn; Martina Koch; Sigrid Landgraf; Corinna Lingnau; Christina Moser; Patricia Ott; Hella Roth; Gabriela Schley; Susanne Schmid; Ursula Thielemann; Andrea Weiermann-Lietz	United States; Beth Anders; Beth Beglin; Regina Buggy; Gwen Cheeseman; Sheryl Johnson; Christine Larson-Mason; Kathleen McGahey; Anita Miller; Leslie Milne; Charlene Morett; Diane Moyer; Marcella Place; Karen Shelton; Brenda Stauffer; Julie Staver; Judy Strong

== Football ==
=== Medal table ===
* Host nation (United States)

Rank	Nation	Gold	Silver	Bronze	Total
1	France	1	0	0	1
2	Brazil	0	1	0	1
3	Yugoslavia	0	0	1	1
Totals (3 entries)		1	1	1	3

=== Medalists ===
Event	Gold	Silver	Bronze
Men's	France; William Ayache; Michel Bensoussan; Michel Bibard; Dominique Bijotat; François Brisson; Patrick Cubaynes; Patrice Garande; Philippe Jeannol; Guy Lacombe; Jean-Claude Lemoult; Jean-Philippe Rohr; Albert Rust; Didier Sénac; Jean-Christophe Thouvenel; José Touré; Daniel Xuereb; Jean-Louis Zanon	Brazil; Pinga; Davi; Milton Cruz; Luís Henrique Dias; André Luís; Mauro Galvão; Tonho; Kita; Gilmar Popoca; Silvinho; Gilmar; Ademir; Paulo Santos; Ronaldo Silva; Dunga; Chicão; Luiz Carlos Winck	Yugoslavia; Mirsad Baljić; Mehmed Baždarević; Vlado Čapljić; Borislav Cvetković; Stjepan Deverić; Milko Đurovski; Marko Elsner; Nenad Gračan; Tomislav Ivković; Srečko Katanec; Branko Miljuš; Mitar Mrkela; Jovica Nikolić; Ivan Pudar; Ljubomir Radanović; Admir Smajić; Dragan Stojković

== Gymnastics ==
=== Medal table ===
* Host nation (United States)

Rank	Nation	Gold	Silver	Bronze	Total
1	United States*	5	5	6	16
2	China	5	4	2	11
3	Romania	5	2	2	9
4	Japan	3	3	3	9
5	Canada	1	0	0	1
6	France	0	0	1	1
6	West Germany	0	0	1	1
Totals (7 entries)		19	14	15	48

=== Artistic gymnastics ===
==== Men's events ====
Games	Gold	Silver	Bronze
Team all-around	United States; Bart Conner; Timothy Daggett; Mitchell Gaylord; James Hartung; Scott Johnson; Peter Vidmar	China; Li Ning; Li Xiaoping; Li Yuejiu; Lou Yun; Tong Fei; Xu Zhiqiang	Japan; Koji Gushiken; Noritoshi Hirata; Nobuyuki Kajitani; Shinji Morisue; Koji Sotomura; Kyoji Yamawaki
Individual all-around	Koji Gushiken; Japan	Peter Vidmar; United States	Li Ning; China
Floor exercise	Li Ning; China	Lou Yun; China	Koji Sotomura; Japan
Floor exercise	Li Ning; China	Lou Yun; China	Philippe Vatuone; France
Pommel horse	Li Ning; China	none awarded (as there was a tie for gold)	Timothy Daggett; United States
Pommel horse	Peter Vidmar; United States	none awarded (as there was a tie for gold)	Timothy Daggett; United States
Rings	Koji Gushiken; Japan	none awarded (as there was a tie for gold)	Mitchell Gaylord; United States
Rings	Li Ning; China	none awarded (as there was a tie for gold)	Mitchell Gaylord; United States
Vault	Lou Yun; China	Mitchell Gaylord; United States	none awarded (as there was a tie for silver)
Vault	Lou Yun; China	Koji Gushiken; Japan	none awarded (as there was a tie for silver)
Vault	Lou Yun; China	Shinji Morisue; Japan	none awarded (as there was a tie for silver)
Vault	Lou Yun; China	Li Ning; China	none awarded (as there was a tie for silver)
Parallel bars	Bart Conner; United States	Nobuyuki Kajitani; Japan	Mitchell Gaylord; United States
Horizontal bar	Shinji Morisue; Japan	Tong Fei; China	Koji Gushiken; Japan

==== Women's events ====
Games	Gold	Silver	Bronze
Team all-around	Romania; Lavinia Agache; Laura Cutina; Cristina Elena Grigoraș; Simona Păucă; Ecaterina Szabo; Mihaela Stănuleț	United States; Pamela Bileck; Michelle Dusserre; Kathy Johnson; Julianne McNamara; Mary Lou Retton; Tracee Talavera	China; Chen Yongyan; Huang Qun; Ma Yanhong; Wu Jiani; Zhou Ping; Zhou Qiurui
Individual all-around	Mary Lou Retton; United States	Ecaterina Szabo; Romania	Simona Păucă; Romania
Vault	Ecaterina Szabo; Romania	Mary Lou Retton; United States	Lavinia Agache; Romania
Uneven bars	Ma Yanhong; China	none awarded (as there was a tie for gold)	Mary Lou Retton; United States
Uneven bars	Julianne McNamara; United States	none awarded (as there was a tie for gold)	Mary Lou Retton; United States
Balance beam	Simona Păucă; Romania	none awarded (as there was a tie for gold)	Kathy Johnson; United States
Balance beam	Ecaterina Szabo; Romania	none awarded (as there was a tie for gold)	Kathy Johnson; United States
Floor exercise	Ecaterina Szabo; Romania	Julianne McNamara; United States	Mary Lou Retton; United States

=== Rhythmic gymnastics ===
Games	Gold	Silver	Bronze
Individual all-around	Lori Fung; Canada	Doina Staiculescu; Romania	Regina Weber; West Germany

== Handball ==
=== Medal table ===
Rank	Nation	Gold	Silver	Bronze	Total
1	Yugoslavia	2	0	0	2
2	South Korea	0	1	0	1
2	West Germany	0	1	0	1
4	China	0	0	1	1
4	Romania	0	0	1	1
Totals (5 entries)		2	2	2	6

=== Medalists ===
Event	Gold	Silver	Bronze
Men's	Yugoslavia; Zlatan Arnautović; Mirko Bašić; Jovica Elezović; Mile Isaković; Pavle Jurina; Milan Kalina; Slobodan Kuzmanovski; Dragan Mladenović; Zdravko Rađenović; Momir Rnić; Branko Štrbac; Veselin Vujović; Veselin Vuković; Zdravko Zovko; Rolando Pušnik	West Germany; Jochen Fraatz; Thomas Happe; Arnulf Meffle; Rüdiger Neitzel; Michael Paul; Dirk Rauin; Siegfried Roch; Michael Roth; Ulrich Roth; Martin Schwalb; Uwe Schwenker; Thomas Springel; Andreas Thiel; Klaus Wöller; Erhard Wunderlich	Romania; Mircea Bedivan; Dumitru Berbece; Iosif Boroş; Alexandru Buligan; Gheorghe Covaciu; Gheorghe Dogărescu; Marian Dumitru; Cornel Durău; Alexandru Fölker; Nicolae Munteanu; Vasile Oprea; Adrian Simion; Vasile Stîngă; Neculai Vasilcă; Maricel Voinea
Women's	Yugoslavia; Svetlana Anastasovska; Alenka Cuderman; Svetlana Dašić-Kitić; Slavica Đukić; Dragica Đurić; Mirjana Đurica; Emilija Erčić; Ljubinka Janković; Jasna Kolar-Merdan; Ljiljana Mugoša; Svetlana Mugoša; Mirjana Ognjenović; Zorica Pavićević; Jasna Ptujec; Biserka Višnjić	South Korea; Han Hwa-Soo; Jeong Hyoi-Soon; Jeung Soon-Bok; Kim Choon-Rye; Kim Kyung-Soon; Kim Mi-sook; Kim Ok-Hwa; Lee Soon-Ei; Lee Young-Ja; Shon Mi-Na; Sung Kyung-Hwa; Yoon Byung-Soon; Yoon Soo-Kyung	China; Chen Zhen; Gao Xiumin; He Jianping; Li Lan; Liu Liping; Liu Yumei; Sun Xiulan; Wang Linwei; Wang Mingxing; Wu Xingjiang; Zhang Weihong; Zhang Peijun; Zhu Juefeng

== Judo ==
=== Medal table ===
* Host nation (United States)

Rank	Nation	Gold	Silver	Bronze	Total
1	Japan	4	0	1	5
2	South Korea	2	2	1	5
3	West Germany	1	0	2	3
4	Austria	1	0	1	2
5	Brazil	0	1	2	3
5	France	0	1	2	3
5	Great Britain	0	1	2	3
8	United States*	0	1	1	2
9	Egypt	0	1	0	1
9	Italy	0	1	0	1
11	Romania	0	0	2	2
12	Canada	0	0	1	1
12	Iceland	0	0	1	1
Totals (13 entries)		8	8	16	32

=== Medalists ===
Games	Gold	Silver	Bronze
Extra Lightweight; 60 kg	Shinji Hosokawa; Japan	Kim Jae-yup; South Korea	Neil Eckersley; Great Britain
Extra Lightweight; 60 kg	Shinji Hosokawa; Japan	Kim Jae-yup; South Korea	Edward Liddie; United States
Half Lightweight; 65 kg	Yoshiyuki Matsuoka; Japan	Hwang Jung-oh; South Korea	Marc Alexandre; France
Half Lightweight; 65 kg	Yoshiyuki Matsuoka; Japan	Hwang Jung-oh; South Korea	Josef Reiter; Austria
Lightweight; 71 kg	Ahn Byeong-keun; South Korea	Ezio Gamba; Italy	Kerrith Brown; Great Britain
Lightweight; 71 kg	Ahn Byeong-keun; South Korea	Ezio Gamba; Italy	Luis Onmura; Brazil
Half Middleweight; 78 kg	Frank Wieneke; West Germany	Neil Adams; Great Britain	Mircea Frăţică; Romania
Half Middleweight; 78 kg	Frank Wieneke; West Germany	Neil Adams; Great Britain	Michel Nowak; France
Middleweight; 86 kg	Peter Seisenbacher; Austria	Robert Berland; United States	Walter Carmona; Brazil
Middleweight; 86 kg	Peter Seisenbacher; Austria	Robert Berland; United States	Seiki Nose; Japan
Half Heavyweight; 95 kg	Ha Hyung-joo; South Korea	Douglas Vieira; Brazil	Bjarni Friðriksson; Iceland
Half Heavyweight; 95 kg	Ha Hyung-joo; South Korea	Douglas Vieira; Brazil	Günther Neureuther; West Germany
Heavyweight +95 kg	Hitoshi Saito; Japan	Angelo Parisi; France	Mark Berger; Canada
Heavyweight +95 kg	Hitoshi Saito; Japan	Angelo Parisi; France	Cho Yong-chul; South Korea
Open category	Yasuhiro Yamashita; Japan	Mohamed Ali Rashwan; Egypt	Mihai Cioc; Romania
Open category	Yasuhiro Yamashita; Japan	Mohamed Ali Rashwan; Egypt	Arthur Schnabel; West Germany

== Modern pentathlon ==
=== Medal table ===
* Host nation (United States)

Rank	Nation	Gold	Silver	Bronze	Total
1	Italy	2	0	1	3
2	Sweden	0	1	0	1
2	United States*	0	1	0	1
4	France	0	0	1	1
Totals (4 entries)		2	2	2	6

=== Medalists ===
Games	Gold	Silver	Bronze
Individual	Daniele Masala; Italy	Svante Rasmuson; Sweden	Carlo Massullo; Italy
Team	Italy; Daniele Masala; Pier Paolo Cristofori; Carlo Massullo	United States; Michael Storm; Robert Gregory Losey; Dean Glenesk	France; Paul Four; Didier Boube; Joël Bouzou

== Rowing ==
=== Medal table ===
* Host nation (United States)

Rank	Nation	Gold	Silver	Bronze	Total
1	Romania	6	2	0	8
2	United States*	2	5	1	8
3	Canada	1	2	3	6
4	West Germany	1	1	1	3
5	New Zealand	1	0	1	2
6	Finland	1	0	0	1
6	Great Britain	1	0	0	1
6	Italy	1	0	0	1
9	Australia	0	1	2	3
10	Belgium	0	1	1	2
10	Netherlands	0	1	1	2
12	Spain	0	1	0	1
13	Denmark	0	0	2	2
14	Norway	0	0	1	1
14	Yugoslavia	0	0	1	1
Totals (15 entries)		14	14	14	42

=== Men's events ===
Games	Gold	Silver	Bronze
Single sculls	Pertti Karppinen; Finland	Peter-Michael Kolbe; West Germany	Robert Mills; Canada
Double sculls	United States; Brad Alan Lewis; Paul Enquist	Belgium; Pierre-Marie Deloof; Dirk Crois	Yugoslavia; Zoran Pančić; Milorad Stanulov
Quadruple sculls (coxless)	West Germany; Albert Hedderich; Raimund Hörmann; Dieter Wiedenmann; Michael Dürsch	Australia; Paul Reedy; Gary Gullock; Timothy McLaren; Anthony Lovrich	Canada; Doug Hamilton; Mike Hughes; Phil Monckton; Bruce Ford
Coxless pairs	Romania; Petru Iosub; Valer Toma	Spain; Fernando Climent; Luis María Lasúrtegui	Norway; Hans Magnus Grepperud; Sverre Løken
Coxed pairs	Italy; Carmine Abbagnale; Giuseppe Abbagnale; Giuseppe Di Capua (cox)	Romania; Dimitrie Popescu; Vasile Tomoiagă; Dumitru Răducanu (cox)	United States; Kevin Still; Robert Espeseth; Doug Herland (cox)
Coxless fours	New Zealand; Les O'Connell; Shane O'Brien; Conrad Robertson; Keith Trask	United States; David Clark; Jonathan Smith; Phillip Stekl; Alan Forney	Denmark; Michael Jessen; Lars Nielsen; Per Rasmussen; Erik Christiansen
Coxed four	Great Britain; Richard Budgett; Martin Cross; Adrian Ellison (cox); Andy Holmes; Steve Redgrave	United States; Edward Ives; Thomas Kiefer; Michael Bach; Gregory Springer; John Stillings (cox)	New Zealand; Brett Hollister (cox); Kevin Lawton; Barrie Mabbott; Don Symon; Ross Tong
Eight	Canada; Blair Horn; Dean Crawford; J. Michael Evans; Paul Steele; Grant Main; Mark Evans; Kevin Neufeld; Pat Turner; Brian McMahon (cox)	United States; Chip Lubsen; Andrew Sudduth; John Terwilliger; Chris Penny; Tom Darling; Fred Borchelt; Charles Clapp; Bruce Ibbetson; Bob Jaugstetter (cox)	Australia; Craig Muller; Clyde Hefer; Samuel Patten; Tim Willoughby; Ian Edmunds; James Battersby; Ion Popa; Stephen Evans; Gavin Thredgold (cox)

=== Women's events ===
Games	Gold	Silver	Bronze
Single sculls	Valeria Răcilă; Romania	Charlotte Geer; United States	Ann Haesebrouck; Belgium
Double sculls	Romania; Mariora Popescu; Elisabeta Oleniuc	Netherlands; Greet Hellemans; Nicolette Hellemans	Canada; Daniele Laumann; Silken Laumann
Quadruple sculls (coxed)	Romania; Titie Taran; Anisoara Sorohan; Ioana Badea; Sofia Corban; Ecaterina Oancia	United States; Anne Marden; Lisa Rohde; Joan Lind; Ginny Gilder; Kelly Rickon	Denmark; Hanne Eriksen; Birgitte Hanel; Charlotte Koefoed; Bodil Rasmussen; Jette Sørensen
Coxless pairs	Romania; Rodica Arba; Elena Horvat	Canada; Elizabeth Craig; Tricia Smith	West Germany; Ellen Becker; Iris Völkner
Coxed four	Romania; Florica Lavric; Maria Fricioiu; Chira Apostol; Olga Bularda; Viorica Ioja	Canada; Marilyn Brain; Angela Schneider; Barbara Armbrust; Jane Tregunno; Lesley Thompson	Australia; Robyn Grey-Gardner; Karen Brancourt; Susan Chapman; Margot Foster; Susan Lee
Eight	United States; Kristen Thorsness; Kristine Norelius; Shyril O'Steen; Carie Graves; Kathy Keeler; Harriet Metcalf; Betsy Beard; Carol Bower; Jeanne Flanagan	Romania; Marioara Trașcă; Lucia Sauca; Doina Liliana Snep-Balan; Aneta Mihaly; Aurora Plesca; Camelia Diaconescu; Viorica Ioja; Mihaela Armășescu; Adriana Bazon-Chelariu	Netherlands; Wiljon Vaandrager; Marieke van Drogenbroek; Harriet van Ettekoven; Catharina Neelissen; Anne Quist; Nicolette Hellemans; Martha Laurijsen; Greet Hellemans; Lynda Cornet

== Sailing ==
=== Medal table ===
* Host nation (United States)

Rank	Nation	Gold	Silver	Bronze	Total
1	United States*	3	4	0	7
2	New Zealand	2	0	1	3
3	Netherlands	1	0	0	1
3	Spain	1	0	0	1
5	Canada	0	1	2	3
6	Brazil	0	1	0	1
6	West Germany	0	1	0	1
8	Australia	0	0	1	1
8	France	0	0	1	1
8	Great Britain	0	0	1	1
8	Italy	0	0	1	1
Totals (11 entries)		7	7	7	21

=== Medalists ===
Event	Gold	Silver	Bronze
Windglider	Stephan van den Berg; Netherlands	Scott Steele; United States	Bruce Kendall; New Zealand
Finn	Russell Coutts; New Zealand	John Bertrand; United States	Terry Neilson; Canada
470	Spain; Luis Doreste; Roberto Molina	United States; Steve Benjamin; Chris Steinfeld	France; Thierry Peponnet; Luc Pillot
Flying Dutchman	United States; Jonathan McKee; William Carl Buchan	Canada; Terry McLaughlin; Evert Bastet	Great Britain; Jonathan Richards; Peter Allam
Tornado	New Zealand; Rex Sellers; Chris Timms	United States; Randy Smyth; Jay Glaser	Australia; Christopher Cairns; Scott Anderson
Star	United States; William Earl Buchan; Steven Erickson	West Germany; Joachim Griese; Michael Marcour	Italy; Giorgio Gorla; Alfio Peraboni
Soling	United States; Robbie Haines; Rod Davis; Ed Trevalyan	Brazil; Torben Grael; Daniel Adler; Ronaldo Senfft	Canada; Hans Fogh; Stephen Calder; John Kerr

== Shooting ==
=== Medal table ===
* Host nation (United States)

Rank	Nation	Gold	Silver	Bronze	Total
1	United States*	3	1	2	6
2	China	3	0	3	6
3	Italy	1	1	1	3
4	France	1	1	0	2
5	Great Britain	1	0	3	4
6	Canada	1	0	0	1
6	Japan	1	0	0	1
8	Austria	0	1	0	1
8	Colombia	0	1	0	1
8	Denmark	0	1	0	1
8	Peru	0	1	0	1
8	Romania	0	1	0	1
8	Sweden	0	1	0	1
8	Switzerland	0	1	0	1
8	West Germany	0	1	0	1
16	Australia	0	0	1	1
16	Finland	0	0	1	1
Totals (17 entries)		11	11	11	33

=== Men's events ===
Event	Gold	Silver	Bronze
10 m air rifle	Philippe Heberlé; France	Andreas Kronthaler; Austria	Barry Dagger; Great Britain
25 m rapid fire pistol	Takeo Kamachi; Japan	Corneliu Ion; Romania	Rauno Bies; Finland
50 m fire pistol	Xu Haifeng; China	Ragnar Skanåker; Sweden	Wang Yifu; China
50 m rifle prone	Edward Etzel; United States	Michel Bury; France	Michael Sullivan; Great Britain
50 m rifle three positions	Malcolm Cooper; Great Britain	Daniel Nipkov; Switzerland	Alister Allan; Great Britain
50 m running target	Li Yuwei; China	Helmut Bellingrodt; Colombia	Huang Shiping; China

=== Women's events ===
Event	Gold	Silver	Bronze
10 m air rifle	Pat Spurgin; United States	Edith Gufler; Italy	Wu Xiaoxuan; China
25 m pistol	Linda Thom; Canada	Ruby Fox; United States	Patricia Dench; Australia
50 m rifle three positions	Wu Xiaoxuan; China	Ulrike Holmer; West Germany	Wanda Jewell; United States

=== Mixed events ===
Event	Gold	Silver	Bronze
Skeet	Matthew Dryke; United States	Ole Riber Rasmussen; Denmark	Luca Scribani Rossi; Italy
Trap	Luciano Giovannetti; Italy	Francisco Boza; Peru	Daniel Carlisle; United States

== Swimming ==
=== Medal table ===
* Host nation (United States)

Rank	Nation	Gold	Silver	Bronze	Total
1	United States*	21	13	0	34
2	Canada	4	3	3	10
3	West Germany	2	3	6	11
4	Netherlands	2	1	3	6
5	Australia	1	5	6	12
6	Great Britain	0	1	4	5
7	France	0	1	1	2
8	Brazil	0	1	0	1
9	Sweden	0	0	2	2
10	Belgium	0	0	1	1
10	Romania	0	0	1	1
10	Switzerland	0	0	1	1
10	Venezuela	0	0	1	1
Totals (13 entries)		30	28	29	87

=== Men's events ===
Games	Gold		Silver		Bronze	
100 m freestyle	Rowdy Gaines; United States	49.80 OR	Mark Stockwell; Australia	50.24	Per Johansson; Sweden	50.31
200 m freestyle	Michael Gross; West Germany	1:47.44 WR	Mike Heath; United States	1:49.10	Thomas Fahrner; West Germany	1:49.69
400 m freestyle	George DiCarlo; United States	3:51.23	John Mykkanen; United States	3:51.49	Justin Lemberg; Australia	3:51.79
1500 m freestyle	Mike O'Brien; United States	15:05.20	George DiCarlo; United States	15:10.59	Stefan Pfeiffer; West Germany	15:12.11
100 m backstroke	Rick Carey; United States	55.79	Dave Wilson; United States	56.35	Mike West; Canada	56.49
200 m backstroke	Rick Carey; United States	2:00.23	Frédéric Delcourt; France	2:01.75	Cameron Henning; Canada	2:02.37
100 m breaststroke	Steve Lundquist; United States	1:01.65 WR	Victor Davis; Canada	1:01.99	Peter Evans; Australia	1:02.97
200 m breaststroke	Victor Davis; Canada	2:13.34 WR	Glenn Beringen; Australia	2:15.79	Étienne Dagon; Switzerland	2:17.41
100 m butterfly	Michael Gross; West Germany	53.08 WR	Pablo Morales; United States	53.23	Glenn Buchanan; Australia	53.85
200 m butterfly	Jon Sieben; Australia	1:57.04 WR	Michael Gross; West Germany	1:57.40	Rafael Vidal; Venezuela	1:57.51
200 m individual medley	Alex Baumann; Canada	2:01.42 WR	Pablo Morales; United States	2:03.05	Neil Cochran; Great Britain	2:04.38
400 m individual medley	Alex Baumann; Canada	4:17.41 WR	Ricardo Prado; Brazil	4:18.45	Rob Woodhouse; Australia	4:20.50
4 × 100 m freestyle relay	United States; Chris Cavanaugh; Mike Heath; Matt Biondi; Rowdy Gaines; Tom Jager*; Robin Leamy*	3:19.03 WR	Australia; Greg Fasala; Neil Brooks; Michael Delany; Mark Stockwell	3:19.68	Sweden; Thomas Lejdström; Per Johansson; Bengt Baron; Mikael Örn; Rikard Milton*; Michael Söderlund*	3:22.69
4 × 200 m freestyle relay	United States; Mike Heath; David Larson; Jeff Float; Bruce Hayes; Geoff Gaberino*; Richard Saeger*	7:15.69 WR	West Germany; Thomas Fahrner; Dirk Korthals; Alexander Schowtka; Michael Gross; Rainer Henkel*	7:15.73	Great Britain; Neil Cochran; Paul Easter; Paul Howe; Andrew Astbury	7:24.78
4 × 100 m medley relay	United States; Rick Carey; Steve Lundquist; Pablo Morales; Rowdy Gaines; Dave Wilson*; Richard Schroeder*; Mike Heath*; Tom Jager*	3:39.30 WR	Canada; Mike West; Victor Davis; Tom Ponting; Sandy Goss	3:43.23	Australia; Mark Kerry; Peter Evans; Glenn Buchanan; Mark Stockwell; Jon Sieben*; Neil Brooks*	3:43.25

* Swimmers who participated in the heats only and received medals.

=== Women's events ===
Games	Gold		Silver		Bronze	
100 m freestyle	Carrie Steinseifer; United States	55.92	none awarded (as there was a tie for gold)		Annemarie Verstappen; Netherlands	56.08
100 m freestyle	Nancy Hogshead; United States	55.92	none awarded (as there was a tie for gold)		Annemarie Verstappen; Netherlands	56.08
200 m freestyle	Mary Wayte; United States	1:59.23	Cynthia Woodhead; United States	1:59.50	Annemarie Verstappen; Netherlands	1:59.69
400 m freestyle	Tiffany Cohen; United States	4:07.10 OR	Sarah Hardcastle; Great Britain	4:10.29	June Croft; Great Britain	4:11.49
800 m freestyle	Tiffany Cohen; United States	8:24.95 OR	Michele Richardson; United States	8:30.73	Sarah Hardcastle; Great Britain	8:32.60
100 m backstroke	Theresa Andrews; United States	1:02.55	Betsy Mitchell; United States	1:02.63	Jolanda de Rover; Netherlands	1:02.91
200 m backstroke	Jolanda de Rover; Netherlands	2:12.38	Amy White; United States	2:13.04	Anca Patrascoiu; Romania	2:13.29
100 m breaststroke	Petra van Staveren; Netherlands	1:09.88 OR	Anne Ottenbrite; Canada	1:10.69	Catherine Poirot; France	1:10.70
200 m breaststroke	Anne Ottenbrite; Canada	2:30.38	Susan Rapp; United States	2:31.15	Ingrid Lempereur; Belgium	2:31.40
100 m butterfly	Mary T. Meagher; United States	59.26	Jenna Johnson; United States	1:00.19	Karin Seick; West Germany	1:01.36
200 m butterfly	Mary T. Meagher; United States	2:06.90 OR	Karen Phillips; Australia	2:10.56	Ina Beyermann; West Germany	2:11.91
200 m individual medley	Tracy Caulkins; United States	2:12.64 OR	Nancy Hogshead; United States	2:15.17	Michelle Pearson; Australia	2:15.92
400 m individual medley	Tracy Caulkins; United States	4:39.24	Suzanne Landells; Australia	4:48.30	Petra Zindler; West Germany	4:48.57
4 × 100 m freestyle relay	United States; Jenna Johnson; Carrie Steinseifer; Dara Torres; Nancy Hogshead; Jill Sterkel*; Mary Wayte*	3:43.43	Netherlands; Annemarie Verstappen; Desi Reijers; Elles Voskes; Conny van Bentum; Wilma van Velsen*	3:44.40	West Germany; Iris Zscherpe; Susanne Schuster; Christiane Pielke; Karin Seick	3:45.56
4 × 100 m medley relay	United States; Theresa Andrews; Tracy Caulkins; Mary T. Meagher; Nancy Hogshead; Betsy Mitchell*; Susan Rapp*; Jenna Johnson*; Carrie Steinseifer*	4:08.34	West Germany; Svenja Schlicht; Ute Hasse; Ina Beyermann; Karin Seick	4:11.97	Canada; Reema Abdo; Anne Ottenbrite; Michelle MacPherson; Pamela Rai	4:12.98

*Swimmers who participated in the heats only and received medals.

== Synchronized swimming ==
=== Medal table ===
* Host nation (United States)

Rank	Nation	Gold	Silver	Bronze	Total
1	United States*	2	0	0	2
2	Canada	0	2	0	2
3	Japan	0	0	2	2
Totals (3 entries)		2	2	2	6

=== Medalists ===
Event	Gold	Silver	Bronze
Solo	Tracie Ruiz; United States	Carolyn Waldo; Canada	Miwako Motoyoshi; Japan
Duet	United States; Candy Costie; Tracie Ruiz	Canada; Sharon Hambrook; Kelly Kryczka	Japan; Saeko Kimura; Miwako Motoyoshi

== Volleyball ==
=== Medal table ===
* Host nation (United States)

Rank	Nation	Gold	Silver	Bronze	Total
1	United States*	1	1	0	2
2	China	1	0	0	1
3	Brazil	0	1	0	1
4	Italy	0	0	1	1
4	Japan	0	0	1	1
Totals (5 entries)		2	2	2	6

=== Medalists ===
Event	Gold	Silver	Bronze
Men's	United States; Douglas Dvorak; Dave Saunders; Steven Salmons; Paul Sunderland; Rich Duwelius; Steve Timmons; Craig Buck; Marc Waldie; Chris Marlowe; Aldis Berzins; Patrick Powers; Karch Kiraly	Brazil; Amauri Ribeiro; Badalhoca; Bernard Rajzman; Bernardo Rezende; Domingos Maracanã; Fernando Ávila; Marcus Vinícius Freire; José Montanaro; Renan Dal Zotto; Rui Nascimento; William; Xandó	Italy; Franco Bertoli; Francesco Dall'Olio; Giancarlo Dametto; Guido De Luigi; Giovanni Errichiello; Giovanni Lanfranco; Andrea Lucchetta; Pier Paolo Lucchetta; Marco Negri; Piero Rebaudengo; Paolo Vecchi; Fabio Vullo
Women's	China; Lang Ping; Liang Yan; Zhu Ling; Hou Yuzhu; Yang Xilan; Jiang Ying; Li Yanjun; Yang Xiaojun; Zheng Meizhu; Zhang Rongfang (c); Su Huijuan; Zhou Xiaolan	United States; Paula Weishoff; Sue Woodstra; Rita Crockett; Laurie Flachmeier; Carolyn Becker; Flo Hyman; Rose Magers; Julie Vollertsen; Debbie Green-Vargas; Kimberly Ruddins; Jeanne Beauprey; Linda Chisholm	Japan; Yumi Egami; Kimie Morita; Yuko Mitsuya; Miyoko Hirose; Kyoko Ishida; Yoko Kagabu; Norie Hiro; Kayoko Sugiyama; Sachiko Otani; Keiko Miyajima; Emiko Odaka; Kumi Nakada

== Water polo ==
=== Medal table ===
Rank	Nation	Gold	Silver	Bronze	Total
1	Yugoslavia	1	0	0	1
2	United States*	0	1	0	1
3	West Germany	0	0	1	1
Totals (3 entries)		1	1	1	3

=== Medalists ===
Event	Gold	Silver	Bronze
Men's	Yugoslavia; Milorad Krivokapić; Deni Lušić; Zoran Petrović; Božo Vuletić; Veselin Đuho; Zoran Roje; Milivoj Bebić; Perica Bukić; Goran Sukno; Tomislav Paškvalin; Igor Milanović; Dragan Andrić; Andrija Popović	United States; Craig Wilson; Kevin Robertson; Gary Figueroa; Peter Campbell; Doug Burke; Joseph Vargas; Jon Svendsen; John Siman; Andrew McDonald; Terry Schroeder; Jody Campbell; Timothy Shaw; Chris Dorst	West Germany; Peter Röhle; Thomas Loebb; Frank Otto; Rainer Hoppe; Armando Fernández; Thomas Huber; Jürgen Schroder; Rainer Osselmann; Hagen Stamm; Roland Freund; Dirk Theismann; Santiago Chalmovsky; Werner Obschernikat

== Weightlifting ==
=== Medal table ===
* Host nation (United States)

Rank	Nation	Gold	Silver	Bronze	Total
1	China	4	2	0	6
2	Romania	2	5	1	8
3	West Germany	2	0	1	3
4	Australia	1	1	0	2
5	Italy	1	0	0	1
6	United States*	0	1	1	2
7	Canada	0	1	0	1
8	Japan	0	0	3	3
9	Finland	0	0	2	2
10	Chinese Taipei	0	0	1	1
10	Great Britain	0	0	1	1
Totals (11 entries)		10	10	10	30

=== Medalists ===
Games	Gold	Silver	Bronze
52 kg	Zeng Guoqiang; China	Zhou Peishun; China	Kazushito Manabe; Japan
56 kg	Wu Shude; China	Lai Runming; China	Masahiro Kotaka; Japan
60 kg	Chen Weiqiang; China	Gelu Radu; Romania	Tsai Wen-yee; Chinese Taipei
67.5 kg	Yao Jingyuan; China	Andrei Socaci; Romania	Jouni Grönman; Finland
75 kg	Karl-Heinz Radschinsky; West Germany	Jacques Demers; Canada	Dragomir Cioroslan; Romania
82.5 kg	Petre Becheru; Romania	Robert Kabbas; Australia	Ryoji Isaoka; Japan
90 kg	Nicu Vlad; Romania	Petre Dumitru; Romania	Peter Mercer; Great Britain
100 kg	Rolf Milser; West Germany	Vasile Groapa; Romania	Pekka Niemi; Finland
110 kg	Norberto Oberburger; Italy	Stefan Tasnadi; Romania	Guy Carlton; United States
+110 kg	Dean Lukin; Australia	Mario Martinez; United States	Manfred Nerlinger; West Germany

== Wrestling ==
=== Medal table ===
Rank	Nation	Gold	Silver	Bronze	Total
1	United States*	9	3	1	13
2	Japan	2	5	2	9
3	South Korea	2	1	4	7
4	Romania	2	1	3	6
5	Yugoslavia	2	1	2	5
6	West Germany	1	2	0	3
7	Finland	1	1	1	3
8	Italy	1	0	0	1
9	Sweden	0	2	2	4
10	Canada	0	1	1	2
10	Greece	0	1	1	2
12	Mexico	0	1	0	1
12	Syria	0	1	0	1
14	Great Britain	0	0	1	1
14	Switzerland	0	0	1	1
14	Turkey	0	0	1	1
Totals (16 entries)		20	20	20	60

=== Freestyle ===
Games	Gold	Silver	Bronze
48 kg	Bobby Weaver; United States	Takashi Irie; Japan	Son Gab-Do; South Korea
52 kg	Shaban Tërstena; Yugoslavia	Kim Jong-kyu; South Korea	Yuji Takada; Japan
57 kg	Hideaki Tomiyama; Japan	Barry Davis; United States	Kim Eui-Kon; South Korea
62 kg	Randall Lewis; United States	Kosei Akaishi; Japan	Lee Jung-Keun; South Korea
68 kg	You In-Tak; South Korea	Andrew Rein; United States	Jukka Rauhala; Finland
74 kg	Dave Schultz; United States	Martin Knosp; West Germany	Shaban Sejdiu; Yugoslavia
82 kg	Mark Schultz; United States	Hideyuki Nagashima; Japan	Christopher Rinke; Canada
90 kg	Ed Banach; United States	Akira Ota; Japan	Noel Loban; Great Britain
100 kg	Lou Banach; United States	Joseph Atiyeh; Syria	Vasile Pușcașu; Romania
+100 kg	Bruce Baumgartner; United States	Robert Molle; Canada	Ayhan Taşkin; Turkey

=== Greco-Roman ===
Games	Gold	Silver	Bronze
48 kg	Vincenzo Maenza; Italy	Markus Scherer; West Germany	Ikuzo Saito; Japan
52 kg	Atsuji Miyahara; Japan	Daniel Aceves; Mexico	Bang Dae-Du; South Korea
57 kg	Pasquale Passarelli; West Germany	Masaki Eto; Japan	Charalambos Cholidis; Greece
62 kg	Kim Weon-Kee; South Korea	Kent-Olle Johansson; Sweden	Hugo Dietsche; Switzerland
68 kg	Vlado Lisjak; Yugoslavia	Tapio Sipilä; Finland	James Martinez; United States
74 kg	Jouko Salomäki; Finland	Roger Tallroth; Sweden	Ștefan Rusu; Romania
82 kg	Ion Draica; Romania	Dimitrios Thanopoulos; Greece	Sören Claeson; Sweden
90 kg	Steve Fraser; United States	Ilie Matei; Romania	Frank Andersson; Sweden
100 kg	Vasile Andrei; Romania	Greg Gibson; United States	Jožef Tertei; Yugoslavia
+100 kg	Jeff Blatnick; United States	Refik Memišević; Yugoslavia	Victor Dolipschi; Romania
