= China at the 1984 Summer Olympics =

- IOC code: CHN
- NOC: Chinese Olympic Committee

in Los Angeles, United States 28 July – 12 August 1984
- Competitors: 215 (132 men and 83 women) in 19 sports
- Flag bearer: Wang Libin
- Medals Ranked 4th: Gold 15 Silver 8 Bronze 9 Total 32

Summer Olympics appearances (overview)
- 1952; 1956–1980; 1984; 1988; 1992; 1996; 2000; 2004; 2008; 2012; 2016; 2020; 2024; 2028

Other related appearances
- Republic of China (1924–1948)

The People's Republic of China competed at the 1984 Summer Olympics in Los Angeles, United States. It was the first appearance at the Summer Games for the country after its mostly symbolic presence at the Summer Games in 1952 during which the dispute between the Republic of China and the PRC resulted in the former withdrawing all its athletes. After 1952 and until these games, the PRC boycotted the Olympics due to the Taiwan's presence as the Republic of China. In 1984, the Republic of China competed as Chinese Taipei and the PRC competed as China. Due to the then ongoing Sino-Soviet split, China did not participate in the Soviet-led boycott. In the previous games, China participated the United States-led boycott to protest the Soviet invasion of Afghanistan in 1979.

215 competitors, 132 men and 83 women, took part in 105 events in 19 sports. The first gold medal to be awarded at the Los Angeles Olympics was also the first-ever medal to be won by an athlete from China when Xu Haifeng won the 50 m Pistol event. Li Ning won also 6 medals in gymnastics, 3 gold, 2 silver, and 1 bronze, earning him the nickname "Prince of Gymnasts" in China. China also earned 15 gold medals, the most in Asia at that time.

== Medalists ==
Medals by sport
**Sport**	1st place, gold medalist(s)	2nd place, silver medalist(s)	3rd place, bronze medalist(s)	**Total**
Gymnastics	5	4	2	11
Weightlifting	4	2	0	6
Shooting	3	0	3	6
Diving	1	1	1	3
Fencing	1	0	0	1
Volleyball	1	0	0	1
Archery	0	1	0	1
Athletics	0	0	1	1
Basketball	0	0	1	1
Handball	0	0	1	1
Total	15	8	9	32

The following Chinese competitors won medals at the games. In the by discipline sections below, medalists' names are bolded.

Medal	Name	Sport	Event	Date
Gold	Li Ning	Gymnastics	Men's Floor Exercise	
Gold	Lou Yun	Gymnastics	Men's Horse Vault	
Gold	Li Ning	Gymnastics	Men's rings	
Gold	Li Ning	Gymnastics	Men's Pommell Horse	
Gold	Ma Yanhong	Gymnastics	Women's Uneven Bars	
Gold	Zhou Jihong	Diving	Women's 10 Metre Platform	
Gold	Luan Jujie	Fencing	Women's Foil Individual	
Gold	Xu Haifeng	Shooting	Men's 50 Metre Free Pistol	
Gold	Li Yuwei	Shooting	Men's Running Target	
Gold	Wu Xiaoxuan	Shooting	Women's 50 Metre Rifle Three Positions	
Gold	Chinese Team	Volleyball	Women's Team	
Gold	Zeng Guoqiang	Weightlifting	Men's 52 kg	
Gold	Wu Shude	Weightlifting	Men's 56 kg	
Gold	Chen Weiqiang	Weightlifting	Men's 60 kg	
Gold	Yao Jingyuan	Weightlifting	Men's 67.5 kg	
Silver	Li Lingjuan	Archery	Women's individual	
Silver	Chinese Team	Gymnastics	Men's all-around Team	
Silver	Lou Yun	Gymnastics	Men's Floor Exercise	
Silver	Li Ning	Gymnastics	Men's Horse Vault	
Silver	Tong Fei	Gymnastics	Men's Horizontal Bar	
Silver	Tan Liangde	Diving	Men's 3m Springboard	
Silver	Zhou Peishun	Weightlifting	Men's 52 kg	
Silver	Lai Runming	Weightlifting	Men's 56 kg	
Bronze	Zhu Jianhua	Athletics	Men's High Jump	
Bronze	Chinese Team	Basketball	Women's Team	
Bronze	Chinese Team	Handball	Women's Team	
Bronze	Li Ning	Gymnastics	Men's Individual All-around	
Bronze	Chinese Team	Gymnastics	Women's all-around Team	
Bronze	Li Kongzheng	Diving	Men's 10 metre platform	
Bronze	Wang Yifu	Shooting	Men's 50 Metre Free Pistol	
Bronze	Huang Shiping	Shooting	Men's Running Target	
Bronze	Wu Xiaoxuan	Shooting	Men's 10 Metre Air Rifle	

=== Gold ===
- Xu Haifeng
- Zeng Guoqiang
- Wu Shude
- Li Yuwei
- Chen Weiqiang
- Yao Jingyuan
- Wu Xiaoxuan
- Luan Jujie
- Li Ning (3)
- Lou Yun
- Ma Yanhong
- Volleyball, Women's team competition (Hou Yuzhu, Jiang Ying, Lang Ping, Li Yanjun, Liang Yan, Su Huijuan, Yang Xiaojun, Yang Xilan, Zhang Rongfang, Zheng Meizhu, Zhou Xiaolan, and Zhu Ling)
- Zhou Jihong.

=== Silver ===
- Li Lingjuan
- Tan Liangde
- Zhou Peishun
- Lai Runming
- Tong Fei
- Men's gymnastics team (Lou Yun, Tong Fei, Li Ning, Xu Zhiqiang, Li Xiaoping, Li Yuejiu, Zou Limin)
- Li Ning
- Lou Yun

=== Bronze ===
- Zhu Jianhua
- Li Kongzheng
- Li Ning
- Huang Shiping
- Wang Yifu
- Wu Xiaoxuan
- Women's Gymnastics Team (Ma Yanhong, Zhou Qiurui, Zhou Ping, Chen Yongyan, Huang Qun, Wu Jiani, and Ming Guixiu)
- Women's Basketball Team Competition (Song Xiaobo, Lijuan Xiu, Chen Yuefang, Zheng Haixia, Qiu Chen, Li Xiaoqin, Zhang Hui, Cong Xuedi, Zhang Yueqin, Ba Yan, Wang Jun, and Liu Qing)
- Women's Handball Team (Wu Xinjiang, Liu Yumei, Chen Jing, Zhang Weihong, Gao Xiumin, Wang Linwei, Liu Liping, Zhang Peijun, Sun Xiulan, Li Lan, Wang Mingxing, Chen Zheng, Guo Yingze, He Jianping, and Zhu Juefeng).

== Archery ==
The PRC sent six archers to the Olympics. The women's team was more successful than the men's, earning a silver medal and an additional top eight finish.

Women's Individual Competition:

- Li Lingjuan - 2559 points (→ Silver Medal)
- Wu Yanan - 2493 points (→ 8th place)
- Wang Jin - 2445 points (→ 18th place)

Men's Individual Competition:

- Yong Shan - 2483 points (→ 18th place)
- Zhang Zheng - 2405 points (→ 36th place)
- Feng Zemin - 2389 points (→ 38th place)

== Athletics ==
=== Track and road events ===
Athlete	Event	Heats		Quarterfinal		Semifinal		Final	
Athlete	Event	Result	Rank	Result	Rank	Result	Rank	Result	Rank
Yu Zhuanghui	Men's 100 metres	10.61	6	—	—	—	—	Did not advance	
Yu Zhuanghui	Men's 200 metres	21.45	4	—	—	—	—	Did not advance	
Yu Zhicheng	Men's 110 metres hurdles	14.33	7	—	—	—	—	Did not advance	
Li Jieqiang	Men's 110 metres hurdles	14.15	8	—	—	—	—	Did not advance	
Zhang Fuxin	Men's 20 km walk	—						1:32:10	27
Zhang Fuxin	Men's 50 km walk	—						4:23:39	15
Liu Huajin	Women's 100 metres hurdles	13.64	5	—	—	—	—	Did not advance	

=== Field events ===
Athlete	Event	Qualification		Final	
Athlete	Event	Result	Rank	Result	Rank
Zhu Jianhua	Men's high jump	2.24 m	1	2.31 m	3rd place, bronze medalist(s)
Liu Yunpeng	Men's high jump	2.24 m	1	2.29 m	7
Cai Shu	Men's high jump	2.24 m	9	2.27 m	8
Liu Yuhuang	Men's long jump	7.83 m	10	7.99 m	5
Wang Shijie	Men's long jump	7.36 m	18	Did not advance	
Zou Zhenxian	Men's triple jump	16.68 m	5	16.83 m	4
Yang Weimin	Men's pole vault	5.30 m	10	5.10 m	10
Ji Zebiao	Men's pole vault	5.10 m	17	Did not advance	
Zheng Dazhen	Women's high jump	1.90 m	13	1.91 m	7
Yang Wenqin	Women's high jump	1.90 m	9	1.88 m	9
Ge Ping	Women's high jump	1.84 m	21	Did not advance	
Liao Wenfen	Women's long jump	6.16 m	15	Did not advance	
Jiao Yunxiang	Women's discus throw	54.70 m	9	53.32 m	11
Li Meisu	Women's shot put	17.96 m	5	17.96 m	5
Yang Yanqin	Women's shot put	16.97 m	10	16.97 m	10
Zhu Hongyang	Women's javelin throw	53.18 m	19	Did not advance	

=== Combined events ===
Athlete	Event	Result	Rank
Weng Kangqiang	Men's decathlon	7662	15

== Basketball ==
=== Men's ===
The Chinese team failed to qualify for the quarterfinals and finished in 10th place.

==== Group Stage ====
Pos	Team	Pld	W	L	PF	PA	PD	Pts	Qualification
1	United States (H)	5	5	0	511	315	+196	10	Quarterfinals
2	Spain	5	4	1	457	438	+19	9	Quarterfinals
3	Canada	5	3	2	462	401	+61	8	Quarterfinals
4	Uruguay	5	2	3	403	460	−57	7	Quarterfinals
5	China	5	1	4	364	477	−113	6	9th–12th classification round
6	France	5	0	5	383	489	−106	5	9th–12th classification round

Source: FIBA archive
Rules for classification: 1) points; 2) head-to-head points; 3) head-to-head goal average; 4) head-to-head number of points scored.
(H) Hosts

29 July 1984

United States	97–49	China
Scoring by half: 50–29, 47–20

The Forum, Inglewood, California

31 July 1984

China	85–83	France
Scoring by half: 39–48, 46–35

The Forum, Inglewood, California

1 August 1984

China	80–121	Canada
Scoring by half: 32–59, 48–62

The Forum, Inglewood, California

3 August 1984

China	83–102	Spain
Scoring by half: 38–50, 45–52

The Forum, Inglewood, California

4 August 1984

China	67–74	Uruguay
Scoring by half: 24–37, 43–37

The Forum, Inglewood, California

==== 9th–12th Place Classification ====
August 5
A5	Brazil	100
B6	France	86
B5	China	76
A6	Egypt	73

9th place (August 10)
A5	Brazil	86
B5	China	76
11th place (August 9)
B6	France	102
A6	Egypt	78

==== Team roster ====
- Wang Haibo
- Lü Jinqing
- Huang Yunlong
- Guo Yonglin
- Kuang Lubin
- Ji Zhaoguang
- Li Yaguang
- Sun Fengwu
- Wang Libin
- Liu Jianli
- Hu Zhangbao
- Zhang Bin

=== Women's team competition ===
==== Group Stage ====
Pos	Team	Pld	W	L	PF	PA	PD	Pts	Qualification
1	United States (H)	5	5	0	431	265	+166	10	Gold medal game
2	South Korea	5	4	1	292	302	−10	9	Gold medal game
3	Canada	5	2	3	313	335	−22	7 (Note: Head-to-head record: Canada 1–0 China)	Bronze medal game
4	China	5	2	3	318	348	−30	7	Bronze medal game
5	Australia	5	1	4	267	317	−50	6 (Note: Head-to-head record: Australia 1–0 Yugoslavia)	
6	Yugoslavia	5	1	4	293	347	−54	6	

Source: FIBA archive
Rules for classification: 1) points; 2) head-to-head points; 3) head-to-head goal average; 4) head-to-head number of points scored.
(H) Hosts
Notes:

30 July 1984

Australia	64–67	China
Scoring by half: 22–28, 42–39

The Forum, Inglewood, California

31 July 1984

China	61–66	Canada
Scoring by half: 33–35, 28–31

The Forum, Inglewood, California

2 August 1984

China	79–58	Yugoslavia
Scoring by half: 34–28, 45–30

The Forum, Inglewood, California

3 August 1984

China	55–91	United States
Scoring by half: 26–38, 29–53

The Forum, Inglewood, California

5 August 1984

South Korea	69–56	China
Scoring by half: 34–25, 35–31

The Forum, Inglewood, California

==== Bronze medal game ====
7 August 1984

China	63–57	Canada
Scoring by half: 37–29, 26–28

The Forum, Inglewood, California

==== Team roster ====
- Ba Yan
- Chen Yuefang
- Cong Xuedi
- Liu Qing
- Li Xiaoqin
- Qiu Chen
- Song Xiaobo
- Wang Jun
- Xiu Lijuan
- Zhang Hui
- Zhang Yueqin
- Zheng Haixia

== Cycling ==
Seven cyclists, four men and three women, represented China in 1984.

Team time trial

- Han Shuxiang, Liu Fu, Wang Wanqiang, and Zeng Bo — 21st place

Women's individual road race

- Lu Suyan — 31st place
- Wang Li — 36th place
- Lu Yu'e — 41st place

== Diving ==
Men's 3m Springboard

- Tan Liangde
  - Preliminary Round — 600.99
  - Final — 662.31 (→ Silver Medal)
- Li Hongping
  - Preliminary Round — 611.55
  - Final — 646.35 (→ 4th place)

Men's 10m Platform

- Li Kongzheng
  - Final ( Bronze Medal)

== Fencing ==
18 fencers, 13 men and 5 women, represented China in 1984.

Men's foil

- Liu Yunhong
- Chu Shisheng
- Yu Yifeng

Men's team foil

- Chu Shisheng, Cui Yining, Yu Yifeng, Wang Wei, Zhang Jian, Liu Yunhong

Men's épée

- Cui Yining
- Zhao Zhizhong
- Zong Xiangqing

Men's team épée

- Cui Yining, Pang Jin, Zhao Zhizhong, Zong Xiangqing

Men's sabre

- Chen Jinchu
- Wang Ruiji
- Liu Guozhen

Men's team sabre

- Wang Ruiji, Chen Jinchu, Yang Shisen, Liu Guozhen, Liu Yunhong

Women's foil

- Jujie Luan
- Zhu Qingyuan
- Li Huahua

Women's team foil

- Jujie Luan, Zhu Qingyuan, Li Huahua, Wu Qiuhua, Zhu Minzhu

== Gymnastics ==
Men

- Lou Yun — Vault, Gold Medal
- Li Ning — Floor Exercise, Pommel Horse, Rings, Gold Medals; Vault, Silver Medal; All-Around, Bronze Medal
- Tong Fei — Horizontal Bar, Silver Medal

Women

- Ma Yanhong — Uneven Bars, Gold Medal

== Handball ==
Women's Team Competition

- Preliminary Round Robin
  - Lost to the United States (22–25)
  - Defeated West Germany (20–19)
  - Tied with South Korea (24-24)
  - Defeated Austria (21–16)
  - Lost to Yugoslavia (25–31) → Bronze Medal
- Team Roster
  - Wu Xingjiang
  - He Jianping
  - Zhu Juefeng
  - Zhang Weihong
  - Gao Xiumin
  - Wang Linwei
  - Liu Liping
  - Sun Xiulan
  - Liu Yumei
  - Li Lan
  - Wang Mingxing
  - Chen Zhen

== Swimming ==
Men's 100m Freestyle

- Mu Lati
  - Heat — 52.82 (→ did not advance, 31st place)
- Shen Jianqiang
  - Heat — 52.84 (→ did not advance, 32nd place)

Men's 200m Freestyle

- Shen Jianqiang
  - Heat — 1:56.08 (→ did not advance, 34th place)

Men's 100m Backstroke

- Wang Hao
  - Heat — 59.13 (→ did not advance, 23rd place)
- Li Zhongyi
  - Heat — 1:00.66 (→ did not advance, 30th place)

Men's 200m Backstroke

- Wang Hao
  - Heat — 2:12.28 (→ did not advance, 28th place)

Men's 100m Breaststroke

- Jin Fu
  - Heat — 1:05.05 (→ did not advance, 17th place)
- Wang Lin
  - Heat — DSQ (→ did not advance, no ranking)

Men's 200m Breaststroke

- Jin Fu
  - Heat — 2:26.?? (→ did not advance, 26th place)

Men's 100m Butterfly

- Zheng Jian
  - Heat — 56.58 (→ did not advance, 26th place)

Men's 200m Individual Medley

- Chen Qin
  - Heat — 2:10.30 (→ did not advance, 24th place)
- Feng Dawei
  - Heat — 2:11.30 (→ did not advance, 25th place)

Men's 4 × 100 m Freestyle Relay

- Mu Lati, Feng Dawei, Chen Qin, and Shen Jianqiang
  - Heat — 3:30.82 (→ did not advance, 15th place)

Men's 4 × 100 m Medley Relay

- Wang Hao, Jin Fu, Zheng Jian, and Mu Lati
  - Heat — 3:51.71 (→ did not advance, 11th place)

Women's 100m Freestyle

- Ding Jilian
  - Heat — 59.11 (→ did not advance, 22nd place)

Women's 100m Backstroke

- Guo Huaying
  - Heat — 1:08.21 (→ did not advance, 25th place)

Women's 200m Backstroke

- Yan Hong
  - Heat — 2:32.33 (→ did not advance, 26th place)

Women's 200m Individual Medley

- Yan Hong
  - Heat — 2:27.95 (→ did not advance, 21st place)

Women's 4x100 Medley Relay

- Guo Huaying, Liang Weifen, Li Jinlan, and Ding Jilian
  - Heat — 4:27.39 (→ did not advance)

== Volleyball ==
Men's Team Competition

- Preliminary Round (Group B)
  - Lost to Japan (0–3)
  - Lost to Italy (0–3)
  - Defeated Egypt (3–0)
  - Lost to Canada (0–3)
- Classification Matches
  - 5th/8th place: Lost to South Korea (1–3)
  - 7th/8th place: Lost to Japan (0–3) → 8th place
- Team Roster
  - Yan Jianming
  - Song Jinwei
  - Yu Juekin
  - Zhai Jixin
  - Zhang Yousheng
  - Zhao Duo
  - Yang Liqun
  - Cao Ping
  - Shen Keqin
  - Zuo Yue
  - Xiao Jinsong
  - Liu Changcheng

Women's Team Competition

- Preliminary Round (Group B)
  - Defeated Brazil (3–0)
  - Defeated West Germany (3–0)
  - Lost to United States (1–3)
- Semi Finals
  - Defeated Japan (3–0)
- Final
  - Defeated United States (3–0) → Gold Medal

== Water polo ==
Men's Team Competition

- Preliminary Round (Group A)
  - Lost to Netherlands (8–10)
  - Lost to Yugoslavia (7–12)
  - Defeated Canada (6–5)
- Final Round (Group E)
  - Defeated Japan (10–4)
  - Lost to Italy (8–11)
  - Defeated Brazil (11–9)
  - Lost to Greece (9–10) → 9th place
- Team Roster
  - Deng Jun
  - Wang Xiaotian
  - Song Weigang
  - Li Jianming
  - Huang Ying
  - Cai Tianxiong
  - Qu Baowei
  - Zhao Bilong
  - Chen Zhixiong
  - Cai Shengliu
  - Pan Shenghua
  - Huang Long
  - Guan Shishi
