= Basketball at the 1984 Summer Olympics – Women's team rosters =

Olympic basketball rosters

Six women's teams competed in basketball at the 1984 Summer Olympics.

== Australia ==
The following players represented Australia:

- Bronwyn Marshall
- Donna Quinn-Brown
- Jenny Cheesman
- Julie Nykiel
- Karen Dalton
- Kathy Foster
- Marina Moffa
- Trish Cockrem
- Pat Mickan
- Robyn Maher
- Sue Geh
- Wendy Laidlaw

== Canada ==
The following players represented Canada:

- Alison Lang
- Andrea Blackwell
- Anna Pendergast
- Bev Smith
- Candi Clarkson-Lohr
- Carol Sealey
- Debbie Huband
- Lynn Polson
- Misty Thomas
- Sylvia Sweeney
- Toni Kordic
- Tracie McAra

== China ==
The following players represented China:

- Chen Yuefang
- Li Xiaoqin
- Ba Yan
- Song Xiaobo
- Qiu Chen
- Wang Jun
- Xiu Lijuan
- Zheng Haixia
- Cong Xuedi
- Zhang Hui
- Liu Qing
- Zhang Yueqin

== South Korea ==
The following players represented South Korea:

- Choi Ae-yeong
- Kim Eun-suk
- Lee Hyeong-suk
- Choi Gyeong-hui
- Lee Mi-ja
- Moon Gyeong-ja
- Kim Hwa-sun
- Jeong Myeong-hui
- Kim Yeong-hui
- Seong Jeong-a
- Park Chan-suk

== United States ==
The following players represented the United States:

- Teresa Edwards
- Lea Henry
- Lynette Woodard
- Anne Donovan
- Cathy Boswell
- Cheryl Miller
- Janice Lawrence
- Cindy Noble
- Kim Mulkey
- Denise Curry
- Pamela McGee
- Carol Menken-Schaudt

== Yugoslavia ==
The following players represented Yugoslavia:

- Biljana Majstorović
- Cvetana Dekleva
- Jasmina Perazić
- Jelica Komnenović
- Marija Uzelac
- Polona Dornik
- Sanja Ožegović
- Slađana Golić
- Slavica Pečikoza
- Slavica Šuka
- Stojna Vangelovska
- Zagorka Počeković
