= Gao Xiumin =

Gao Xiumin may refer to:

- Gao Xiumin (actress) (1959–2005), Chinese actress
- Gao Xiumin (handballer) (born 1963), Chinese Olympic handball player
