= Yumei =

Yumei (Chinese: 玉梅) is a female given name of Chinese origin. Notable people with the given name include:

- Chen Yu-mei (1966–2017), Republic of China politician
- Chen Yumei (1910–1985), Chinese film actress and singer, fl. 1920s-1930s
- Liu Yumei (born 1961), Chinese former handball player
- Tian Yumei (born 1965), Chinese former sprint athlete
- Wang Yumei (born 1934), Chinese film actress
