= Huang Ying =

Huang Ying or Ying Huang is the name of:

== Singers ==
- Ying Huang (soprano) (born 1968), Chinese operatic soprano
- Huang Ying (pop singer) (born 1989), Chinese female pop singer

== Sportspeople ==
- Huang Ying (water polo) (born 1957), Chinese male water polo player
- Huang Ying (gymnast) (born 1977), Chinese rhythmic gymnast

== Others ==
- Huang Ying (wuxia novelist) (born 1956), Hong Kong wuxia novelist

== See also ==
- Huangying Township, a township in Chongqing, China
