= Archery at the 1984 Summer Olympics =

Archery at the Games of the XXIII Olympiad
- Venue: El Dorado Park
- Dates: 8–11 August 1984
- No. of events: 2 (1 men, 1 women)
- Competitors: 109 from 35 nations

Archery at the 1984 Summer Olympics was contested in the format used since 1972. There were two events: men's individual and women's individual. Points were in a format called the double FITA round, which included 288 arrows shot over four days at four different distances: 70 meters, 60 meters, 50 meters, 30 meters for women; 90 meters, 70 meters, 50 meters, 30 meters for men. It was the fourth, and last, time that the format was used in Olympic competition.

Neroli Fairhall from New Zealand, who came 35th in the Women's individual event, was the first paraplegic athlete to compete at the Olympic Games.

== Medal summary ==
=== Events ===
Event	Gold	Silver	Bronze
Men's individual	Darrell Pace; United States	Richard McKinney; United States	Hiroshi Yamamoto; Japan
Women's individual	Seo Hyang-soon; South Korea	Li Lingjuan; China	Kim Jin-ho; South Korea

=== Medal table ===
Rank	Nation	Gold	Silver	Bronze	Total
1	United States	1	1	0	2
2	South Korea	1	0	1	2
3	China	0	1	0	1
4	Japan	0	0	1	1
Totals (4 entries)		2	2	2	6

== Participating nations ==
Nation	Men's Individual	Women's Individual	Total
Australia	1	1	2
Austria	0	1	1
Belgium	3	2	5
Bhutan	3	3	6
Brazil	1	0	1
Canada	0	3	3
China	3	3	6
Chinese Taipei	1	1	2
Colombia	1	0	1
Finland	3	2	5
France	2	0	2
Great Britain	3	3	6
Hong Kong	3	3	6
Indonesia	2	0	2
Ireland	0	2	2
Italy	2	1	3
Japan	3	2	5
Luxembourg	2	1	3
Malta	0	1	1
Mexico	1	1	2
Monaco	1	0	1
Netherlands	1	1	2
New Zealand	1	2	3
Norway	1	0	1
Portugal	1	0	1
Puerto Rico	1	0	1
Saudi Arabia	3	0	3
South Korea	3	3	6
Spain	2	2	4
Sweden	3	2	5
Switzerland	1	2	3
Thailand	2	0	2
Turkey	2	0	2
United States	3	3	6
West Germany	3	2	5
Total athletes	62	47	109
Total NOCs	31	24	35

== See also ==
- Archery at the Friendship Games
