= Handball at the 1984 Summer Olympics =

Tournament details
- Host country: United States
- Venue: Titan Gym
- Dates: 31 July – 11 August 1984
- Teams: 18

Final positions
- Champions: Yugoslavia (men); Yugoslavia (women)
- Runners-up: West Germany (men); South Korea (women)
- Third place: Romania (men); China (women)
- Fourth place: Denmark (men); West Germany (women)

Handball at the 1984 Summer Olympics featured competition for men and women. Due to the USSR-led boycott some strong handball nations from Eastern Bloc did not compete; this gave an opportunity to the Yugoslav team to take both gold medals. Games were played at Titan Gym in Fullerton, California, and the finals were at the Forum, later the Kia Forum, in Inglewood, California.

== Qualification ==
=== Men ===
Qualification	Date	Host	Vacancies	Qualified
Host nation	18 May 1978	(Greece) Athens	1	United States
1982 World Championship	23 February – 7 March 1982	West Germany	6	~~Soviet Union~~^{1} Yugoslavia; ~~Poland~~^{1} Denmark; Romania; ~~East Germany~~^{1} West Germany; Spain; Japan
1983 World Championship B	25 February – 6 March 1983	Netherlands	~~2~~ 3	~~Hungary~~^{1} ~~Czechoslovakia~~^{1} Sweden; Switzerland; Iceland^{2}
Asian qualification tournament	12–20 November 1983	(Japan) Sagamihara	1	~~Japan~~; South Korea
1983 Pan American Men's Handball Championship	2–6 February 1972	(United States) Colorado Springs	~~1~~ 0	~~Cuba~~^{1} ~~Canada~~^{2}
1983 African Men's Handball Championship	22–31 July 1983	(Egypt) Cairo	1	Algeria
Total			12	

=== Women ===
Qualification	Date	Host	Vacancies	Qualified
Host nation	18 May 1978	(Greece) Athens	1	United States
1982 World Championship	2–12 December 1982	Hungary	~~4~~ 2	~~Soviet Union~~^{1} ~~Hungary~~^{1}Yugoslavia; ~~East Germany~~^{1} South Korea
Intercontinental Olympic Qualification	-	-	1	China^{3}
1983 World Championship B	7–15 December 1983	Poland	~~0~~ 2	West Germany; Austria
Total			6	

^{1}:Teams joined Soviet lead boycott
^{2}:Canada was invited to replace Cuba, but rejected the invitation, because COA supposed the team is not good enough. Then, IHF invited Iceland.
^{3}:Brazil and Canada withdraw. So China qualified without play.

== Medal summary ==
Event	Gold	Silver	Bronze
Men	Yugoslavia Zlatan Arnautović; Mirko Bašić; Jovica Elezović; Mile Isaković; Pavle Jurina; Milan Kalina; Slobodan Kuzmanovski; Dragan Mladenović; Zdravko Rađenović; Momir Rnić; Branko Štrbac; Veselin Vujović; Veselin Vuković; Zdravko Zovko; Rolando Pušnik	West Germany Jochen Fraatz; Thomas Happe; Arnulf Meffle; Rüdiger Neitzel; Michael Paul; Dirk Rauin; Siegfried Roch; Michael Roth; Ulrich Roth; Martin Schwalb; Uwe Schwenker; Thomas Springel; Andreas Thiel; Klaus Wöller; Erhard Wunderlich	Romania Mircea Bedivan; Dumitru Berbece; Iosif Boroş; Alexandru Buligan; Gheorghe Covaciu; Gheorghe Dogărescu; Marian Dumitru; Cornel Durău; Alexandru Fölker; Nicolae Munteanu; Vasile Oprea; Adrian Simion; Vasile Stîngă; Neculai Vasilcă; Maricel Voinea
Women	Yugoslavia Svetlana Anastasovska; Alenka Cuderman; Svetlana Dašić-Kitić; Slavica Đukić; Dragica Đurić; Mirjana Đurica; Emilija Erčić; Ljubinka Janković; Jasna Kolar-Merdan; Ljiljana Mugoša; Svetlana Mugoša; Mirjana Ognjenović; Zorica Pavićević; Jasna Ptujec; Biserka Višnjić	South Korea Han Hwa-Soo; Jeong Hyoi-Soon; Jeung Soon-Bok; Kim Choon-Rye; Kim Kyung-Soon; Kim Mi-sook; Kim Ok-Hwa; Lee Soon-Ei; Lee Young-Ja; Shon Mi-Na; Sung Kyung-Hwa; Yoon Byung-Soon; Yoon Soo-Kyung	China Chen Zhen; Gao Xiumin; He Jianping; Li Lan; Liu Liping; Liu Yumei; Sun Xiulan; Wang Linwei; Wang Mingxing; Wu Xingjiang; Zhang Weihong; Zhang Peijun; Zhu Juefeng

== Participating nations ==
Each qualified country was allowed to enter one team of 15 players and they all were eligible for participation. Four nations competed in both tournaments.

A total of 259(*) handball players (177 men and 82 women) from 14 nations (men from 12 nations - women from 6 nations) competed at the Los Angeles Games:

- Algeria (15) (men:15 women:0)
- Austria (15) (men:0 women:15)
- China (13) (men:0 women:13)
- Denmark (14) (men:14 women:0)
- West Germany (28) (men:15 women:13)
- Iceland (15) (men:15 women:0)
- Japan (15) (men:15 women:0)
- Romania (15) (men:15 women:0)
- South Korea (28) (men:15 women:13)
- Spain (15) (men:15 women:0)
- Sweden (15) (men:15 women:0)
- Switzerland (15) (men:15 women:0)
- United States (27) (men:14 women:13)
- Yugoslavia (29) (men:14 women:15)

(*) NOTE: There are only players counted, which participated in one game at least.

== Medal table ==
Rank	Nation	Gold	Silver	Bronze	Total
1	Yugoslavia	2	0	0	2
2	South Korea	0	1	0	1
2	West Germany	0	1	0	1
4	China	0	0	1	1
4	Romania	0	0	1	1
Totals (5 entries)		2	2	2	6

== Railing collapse ==
The only multi-casualty event noted in the 1984 official report of the Los Angeles Olympics was a small one at team handball where a railing on the bleachers collapsed. The first aid team and the chief medical officer handled the situation quickly and professionally. First aid teams were responsible for moving victims from the stands and broken railings. However, a concern that was not anticipated was the lack of experience in carrying patients from the stands. Four of eight spectators who fell through a wooden railing while trying to catch bouquets from victorious Olympic medal-winners suffered minor injuries but were not hospitalized.
