= Basketball at the 1984 Summer Olympics =

11th Olympic Basketball Tournament
- Los Angeles 1984

Tournament details
- Olympics: 1984 Summer Olympics
- Host nation: United States of America
- City: Los Angeles
- Duration: July 29 – August 10, 1984

Men's tournament
- Teams: 12
Medals
Gold medalists	United States
Silver medalists	Spain
Bronze medalists	Yugoslavia

Women's tournament
- Teams: 6
Medals
Gold medalists	United States
Silver medalists	South Korea
Bronze medalists	China

Tournaments
← Moscow 1980	Seoul 1988 →

Basketball at the 1984 Summer Olympics was the eleventh appearance of the sport of basketball as an official Olympic medal event. It took place at The Forum in Inglewood, California, United States from July 29 to August 10. The United States won the gold medal in both events, the men’s team’s 9th victory and the women's team’s 1st win marking their first gold medal. Due to the boycott, the Soviet Union and Hungary withdrew from the tournament. The former, having already qualified for both events, was replaced by West Germany in the men's competition, while both nations' women's teams were replaced by Australia and South Korea.

== Medal summary ==
Event	Gold	Silver	Bronze
Men's	United States Steve Alford; Leon Wood; Patrick Ewing; Vernon Fleming; Alvin Robertson; Michael Jordan; Joe Kleine; Jon Koncak; Wayman Tisdale; Chris Mullin; Sam Perkins; Jeff Turner	Spain José Manuel Beirán; José Luis Llorente; Fernando Arcega; Josep Maria Margall; Andrés Jiménez; Fernando Romay; Fernando Martín; Juan Antonio Corbalán; Ignacio Solozábal; Juan Domingo de la Cruz; Juan Manuel López Iturriaga; Juan Antonio San Epifanio, "Epi"	Yugoslavia Dražen Petrović; Aleksandar Petrović; Rajko Žižić; Andro Knego; Nebojša Zorkić; Ivan Sunara; Sabit Hadžić; Dražen Dalipagić; Emir Mutapčić; Ratko Radovanović; Mihovil Nakić; Branko Vukićević
Women's	United States Teresa Edwards; Lea Henry; Lynette Woodard; Anne Donovan; Cathy Boswell; Cheryl Miller; Janice Lawrence; Cindy Noble; Kim Mulkey; Denise Curry; Pam McGee; Carol Menken-Schaudt	South Korea Choi Aei-young; Kim Eun-sook; Lee Hyung-sook; Choi Kyung-hee; Lee Mi-ja; Moon Kyung-ja; Kim Hwa-soon; Jeong Myung-hee; Kim Young-hee; Sung Jung-a; Park Chan-sook; Park Yang-gae	China Chen Yuefang; Li Xiaoqin; Ba Yan; Song Xiaobo; Qiu Chen; Wang Jun; Xiu Lijuan; Zheng Haixia; Cong Xuedi; Zhang Hui; Liu Qing; Zhang Yueqin

== Qualification ==
A NOC may enter up to one men's team with 12 players and up to one women's team with 12 players. Automatic qualifications were granted to the host country for both events plus the gold and silver medal winners from the previous Olympic Games in the men's tournament, and the champion at the 1983 FIBA World Championship in the women's tournament. Additional spots for the men's tournament were decided via the continental championships held by FIBA, while additional spots for the women's competition were assigned to the top six teams in a tournament held in Havana, Cuba.

=== Men ===
Means of qualification	Date	Venue	Berths	Qualified
Host nation	18 May 1978	(Greece) Athens	1	United States
1980 Summer Olympics	20–30 July 1980	(Soviet Union) Moscow	2	Yugoslavia; Italy
1983 FIBA Oceania Championship	30 August–3 September 1983	New Zealand	1	Australia
1983 ABC Championship	20 – 29 November 1983	Hong Kong	1	China
FIBA Africa Championship 1983	19–28 December 1983	(Egypt) Alexandria	1	Egypt
1984 Tournament of the Americas	15–24 May 1984	(Brazil) São Paulo	3	Brazil; Uruguay; Canada
1984 European Qualifying Tournament	15–25 May 1984	Switzerland	3	~~Soviet Union~~^{[a]} Spain; France; West Germany^{[b]}
Total			12	

=== Women ===
Means of qualification	Date	Venue	Berths	Qualified
Host nation	18 May 1978	(Greece) Athens	1	United States
1983 FIBA World Championship for Women	24 July – 6 August 1983	Brazil	~~1~~ 0	~~Soviet Union~~^{[a]}
World Qualifying Tournament	5–16 May 1984	(Cuba) Havana	~~4~~ 5	China; Yugoslavia; Canada; ~~Hungary~~^{[a]} ~~Cuba~~^{[a]} South Korea^{[c]} Australia^{[c]}
Total			6	

- ^{a} Withdrew from the tournament.
- ^{b} Replaced the Soviet Union.
- ^{c} Replaced the Soviet Union and Hungary.

== Format ==
Men's tournament:

- Two groups of six teams are formed, where the top four from each group advance to the knockout stage.
- Fifth and sixth places from each group form an additional bracket to decide 9th–12th places in the final ranking.
- In the quarterfinals, the matchups are as follows: A1 vs. B4, A2 vs. B3, A3 vs. B2 and A4 vs. B1.
  - The four teams eliminated from the quarterfinals form an additional bracket to decide 5th–8th places in the final ranking.
- The winning teams from the quarterfinals meet in the semifinals.
- The winning teams from the semifinals contest the gold medal. The losing teams contest the bronze.

Women's tournament:

- One round-robin group is formed containing all six teams, where the top two compete for the gold medal, while the third and fourth places compete for the bronze medal in an additional match.
- The remaining two teams finish with their group rank in the final standings.

Tie-breaking criteria:

1. Head to head results
2. Goal average (not the goal difference) between the tied teams
3. Goal average of the tied teams for all teams in its group

== Men's tournament ==
=== Preliminary round ===
The top four places in each of the preliminary round groups advanced to the eight team, single-elimination knockout stage, where Group A teams would meet Group B teams. Both hosts United States and reigning Olympic Champions Yugoslavia advanced undefeated to the knockout phase. China, Egypt, Brazil, and France placed fifth and sixth in their respective groups and competed in the classification round.

==== Group A ====
Pos	Team	Pld	W	L	PF	PA	PD	Pts	Qualification
1	Yugoslavia	5	5	0	457	366	+91	10	Quarterfinals
2	Italy	5	4	1	437	363	+74	9	Quarterfinals
3	Australia	5	3	2	383	403	−20	8	Quarterfinals
4	West Germany	5	2	3	384	376	+8	7	Quarterfinals
5	Brazil	5	1	4	401	423	−22	6	9th–12th classification round
6	Egypt	5	0	5	349	480	−131	5	9th–12th classification round

Source: [ FIBA archive]
Rules for classification: 1) points; 2) head-to-head points; 3) head-to-head goal average; 4) head-to-head number of points scored.

29 July 1984

Italy	110–62	Egypt
Scoring by half: 56–31, 54–31

The Forum, Inglewood, California

29 July 1984

Yugoslavia	96–83	West Germany
Scoring by half: 49–41, 47–42

The Forum, Inglewood, California

29 July 1984

Australia	76–72	Brazil
Scoring by half: 34–38, 42–34

The Forum, Inglewood, California

30 July 1984

Italy	80–72	West Germany
Scoring by half: 33–39, 47–33

The Forum, Inglewood, California

30 July 1984

Brazil	91–82	Egypt
Scoring by half: 45–43, 46–39

The Forum, Inglewood, California

30 July 1984

Yugoslavia	94–64	Australia
Scoring by half: 39–28, 55–36

The Forum, Inglewood, California

1 August 1984

Australia	67–66	West Germany
Scoring by half: 31–36, 36–30

The Forum, Inglewood, California

1 August 1984

Yugoslavia	100–69	Egypt
Scoring by half: 56–31, 55–36

The Forum, Inglewood, California

1 August 1984

Italy	89–78	Brazil
Scoring by half: 43–44, 46–34

The Forum, Inglewood, California

2 August 1984

West Germany	85–58	Egypt
Scoring by half: 40–24, 45–34

The Forum, Inglewood, California

2 August 1984

Yugoslavia	98–85	Brazil
Scoring by half: 55–50, 43–35

The Forum, Inglewood, California

2 August 1984

Italy	93–82	Australia
Scoring by half: 48–48, 45–34

The Forum, Inglewood, California

4 August 1984

Australia	94–78	Egypt
Scoring by half: 38–37, 56–41

The Forum, Inglewood, California

4 August 1984

West Germany	78–75	Brazil
Scoring by half: 41–37, 37–38

The Forum, Inglewood, California

4 August 1984

Yugoslavia	69–65	Italy
Scoring by half: 34–28, 35–37

The Forum, Inglewood, California

==== Group B ====
Pos	Team	Pld	W	L	PF	PA	PD	Pts	Qualification
1	United States (H)	5	5	0	511	315	+196	10	Quarterfinals
2	Spain	5	4	1	457	438	+19	9	Quarterfinals
3	Canada	5	3	2	462	401	+61	8	Quarterfinals
4	Uruguay	5	2	3	403	460	−57	7	Quarterfinals
5	China	5	1	4	364	477	−113	6	9th–12th classification round
6	France	5	0	5	383	489	−106	5	9th–12th classification round

Source: FIBA archive
Rules for classification: 1) points; 2) head-to-head points; 3) head-to-head goal average; 4) head-to-head number of points scored.
(H) Hosts

29 July 1984

Uruguay	91–87 (OT)	France
Scoring by half: 35–41, 38–32 Overtime: 18–14

The Forum, Inglewood, California

29 July 1984

United States	97–49	China
Scoring by half: 50–29, 47–20

The Forum, Inglewood, California

29 July 1984

Spain	83–82	Canada
Scoring by half: 45–40, 38–42

The Forum, Inglewood, California

31 July 1984

China	85–83	France
Scoring by half: 39–48, 46–35

The Forum, Inglewood, California

31 July 1984

United States	89–68	Canada
Scoring by half: 43–28, 46–40

The Forum, Inglewood, California

31 July 1984

Uruguay	90–107	Spain
Scoring by half: 43–58, 47–49

The Forum, Inglewood, California

1 August 1984

China	80–121	Canada
Scoring by half: 32–59, 48–62

The Forum, Inglewood, California

1 August 1984

United States	104–68	Uruguay
Scoring by half: 58–37, 46–31

The Forum, Inglewood, California

1 August 1984

France	82–97	Spain
Scoring by half: 47–58, 35–39

The Forum, Inglewood, California

3 August 1984

China	83–102	Spain
Scoring by half: 38–50, 45–52

The Forum, Inglewood, California

3 August 1984

United States	120–62	France
Scoring by half: 57–25, 63–37

The Forum, Inglewood, California

3 August 1984

Canada	95–80	Uruguay
Scoring by half: 46–47, 49–33

The Forum, Inglewood, California

4 August 1984

United States	101–68	Spain
Scoring by half: 46–41, 55–27

The Forum, Inglewood, California

4 August 1984

Canada	96–69	France
Scoring by half: 40–31, 56–38

The Forum, Inglewood, California

4 August 1984

China	67–74	Uruguay
Scoring by half: 24–37, 43–37

The Forum, Inglewood, California

=== Knockout stage ===
==== Championship bracket ====
Quarterfinals (August 6)
A1	Yugoslavia	110
B4	Uruguay	82
B2	Spain	101
A3	Australia	93
B1	United States	78
A4	West Germany	67
A2	Italy	72
B3	Canada	78

Semifinals (August 8)
A1	Yugoslavia	61
B2	Spain	74
B1	United States	78
B3	Canada	59

Gold medal game (August 10)
B2	Spain	65
B1	United States	96
Bronze medal game (August 9)
A1	Yugoslavia	88
B3	Canada	82

==== Classification brackets ====
5th–8th Place

August 8
A3	Australia	95
B4	Uruguay	101
A2	Italy	98
A4	West Germany	71

5th place (August 10)
B4	Uruguay	102
A2	Italy	111
7th place (August 10)
A3	Australia	83
A4	West Germany	78

9th–12th Place

August 5
A5	Brazil	100
B6	France	86
B5	China	76
A6	Egypt	73

9th place (August 10)
A5	Brazil	86
B5	China	76
11th place (August 9)
B6	France	102
A6	Egypt	78

== Women's tournament ==
=== Preliminary round ===
The first two places in the preliminary group compete for the gold medal, while the third and fourth places compete for the bronze. The remaining teams' group ranking determines their positions in the final standings. With the withdrawal of the Soviet Union's women's team, a new Olympic champion was to be crowned in Los Angeles. The host nation's team went through the first round undefeated and won their first gold medal against South Korea, one of the teams invited to replace the Soviet Union and Hungary. China, the other Asian representative, earned a bronze medal by defeating Canada. Yugoslavia's team couldn't repeat their bronze medal performance from the previous tournament and finished at the bottom of the rankings.

Pos	Team	Pld	W	L	PF	PA	PD	Pts	Qualification
1	United States (H)	5	5	0	431	265	+166	10	Gold medal game
2	South Korea	5	4	1	292	302	−10	9	Gold medal game
3	Canada	5	2	3	313	335	−22	7 (Note: Head-to-head record: Canada 1–0 China)	Bronze medal game
4	China	5	2	3	318	348	−30	7	Bronze medal game
5	Australia	5	1	4	267	317	−50	6 (Note: Head-to-head record: Australia 1–0 Yugoslavia)	
6	Yugoslavia	5	1	4	293	347	−54	6	

Source: FIBA archive
Rules for classification: 1) points; 2) head-to-head points; 3) head-to-head goal average; 4) head-to-head number of points scored.
(H) Hosts
Notes:

30 July 1984

Yugoslavia	55–83	United States
Scoring by half: 29–43, 26–40

The Forum, Inglewood, California

30 July 1984

Australia	64–67	China
Scoring by half: 22–28, 42–39

The Forum, Inglewood, California

30 July 1984

South Korea	67–62	Canada
Scoring by half: 34–32, 33–30

The Forum, Inglewood, California

31 July 1984

Australia	47–81	United States
Scoring by half: 28–51, 19–30

The Forum, Inglewood, California

31 July 1984

Yugoslavia	52–55	South Korea
Scoring by half: 24–27, 28–28

The Forum, Inglewood, California

31 July 1984

China	61–66	Canada
Scoring by half: 33–35, 28–31

The Forum, Inglewood, California

2 August 1984

Australia	45–56	Canada
Scoring by half: 18–30, 28–26

The Forum, Inglewood, California

2 August 1984

United States	84–47	South Korea
Scoring by half: 40–20, 44–27

The Forum, Inglewood, California

2 August 1984

China	79–58	Yugoslavia
Scoring by half: 34–28, 45–30

The Forum, Inglewood, California

3 August 1984

Australia	48–54	South Korea
Scoring by half: 19–26, 29–28

The Forum, Inglewood, California

3 August 1984

Canada	68–69	Yugoslavia
Scoring by half: 33–34, 35–35

The Forum, Inglewood, California

3 August 1984

China	55–91	United States
Scoring by half: 26–38, 29–53

The Forum, Inglewood, California

5 August 1984

South Korea	69–56	China
Scoring by half: 34–25, 35–31

The Forum, Inglewood, California

5 August 1984

Canada	61–92	United States
Scoring by half: 31–41, 30–51

The Forum, Inglewood, California

5 August 1984

Australia	62–59	Yugoslavia
Scoring by half: 25–31, 37–28

The Forum, Inglewood, California

=== Bronze medal game ===
7 August 1984

China	63–57	Canada
Scoring by half: 37–29, 26–28

The Forum, Inglewood, California

=== Gold medal game ===
7 August 1984

United States	85–55	South Korea
Scoring by half: 42–27, 43–28

The Forum, Inglewood, California

== Awards ==
1984 Olympic Basketball Champions

United States
First title

== Final standings ==
Rank	Men				Women			
Rank	Team	Pld	W	L	Team	Pld	W	L
1st place, gold medalist(s)	United States	8	8	0	United States	6	6	0
2nd place, silver medalist(s)	Spain	8	6	2	South Korea	6	4	2
3rd place, bronze medalist(s)	Yugoslavia	8	7	1	China	6	3	3
4th	Canada	8	4	4	Canada	6	2	4
Eliminated at the quarterfinals								
5th	Italy	8	6	2	Australia	5	1	4
6th	Uruguay	8	3	5	Yugoslavia	5	1	4
7th	Australia	8	4	4				
8th	West Germany	8	2	6				
Preliminary round 5th placers								
9th	Brazil	7	3	4				
10th	China	7	2	5				
Preliminary round 6th placers								
11th	France	7	1	6				
12th	Egypt	7	0	7				

== See also ==
- Basketball at the 1984 Summer Olympics – Men's team rosters
- Basketball at the 1984 Summer Olympics – Women's team rosters
- Basketball at the Friendship Games
