= Wu Qiuhua =

Chinese fencer

Personal information
- Full name: Chinese: 吳 秋花; pinyin: Wú Qiū-huā
- Born: 21 June 1959 (age 67)

Sport
- Sport: Fencing

Wu Qiuhua (born 21 June 1959) is a Chinese fencer. She competed in the women's team foil event at the 1984 Summer Olympics.
