= Yang Shisen =

Chinese fencer

Personal information
- Full name: Chinese: 楊 世森; pinyin: Yáng Shì-sēn
- Born: 20 March 1958 (age 68)

Sport
- Sport: Fencing

Yang Shisen (born 20 March 1958) is a Chinese fencer. He competed in the team sabre event at the 1984 Summer Olympics.
