= Thomas Springel =

German handball player (born 1959)

Personal information
- Born: 15 May 1959 (age 67) Aachen, West Germany
- Height: 1.94 m (6 ft 4 in)
Medal record
Men's handball
Representing West Germany
Olympic Games
| Silver medal – second place | 1984 Los Angeles | Team |

Thomas Springel (born 15 May 1959) is a former West German handball player who competed in the 1984 Summer Olympics.

He was a member of the West German handball team which won the silver medal. He played five matches and scored eight goals.
