= Yoon Soo-kyung =

South Korean handball player (born 1964)

Yoon Soo-Kyung
Personal information
- Born: 19 January 1964 (age 62)
- Height: 1.68 m (5 ft 6 in)

Sport
- Sport: Handball
National team
- Years: Team
- –: South Korea
Medal record
Women's handball
Representing South Korea
Olympic Games
Silver medal – second place	1984 Los Angeles	Team
|}

- Yoon Soo-kyung
- Hangul: 윤수경
- Hanja: 尹秀卿
- RR: Yun Sugyeong
- MR: Yun Sugyŏng

Yoon Soo-Kyung (born January 19, 1964), also spelled as Yun Su-Gyeong, is a South Korean team handball player and Olympic medalist. She played with the South Korean team at the 1984 Summer Olympics in Los Angeles, where the team received a silver medal.
