= Pang Jin =

Chinese fencer

Personal information
- Full name: Chinese: 龐 進; pinyin: Páng Jìn
- Born: 27 September 1960 (age 65)

Sport
- Sport: Fencing

Pang Jin (born 27 September 1960) is a Chinese fencer. He competed in the team épée event at the 1984 Summer Olympics.
