= Klaus Wöller =

German handball player (1956–2024)

Personal information
- Born: 23 April 1956 Hannover, Lower Saxony, West Germany
- Died: 14 December 2024 (aged 68)
- Height: 1.87 m (6 ft 2 in)
Medal record
Men's handball
Representing West Germany
Olympic Games
Silver medal – second place	1984 Los Angeles	Team

Klaus Wöller (23 April 1956 – 14 December 2024) was a West German handball player who competed in the 1984 Summer Olympics.

Wöller was a member of the West German handball team which won the silver medal. He played five matches as goalkeeper.

Wöller died on 14 December 2024, at the age of 68.
