= Chen Qin =

Chinese swimmer (born 1963)

Personal information
- Born: February 10, 1963 (age 63)

Sport
- Sport: Swimming
- Strokes: Freestyle, medley
Medal record
Representing China
Asian Games
Silver medal – second place	1986 Seoul	200m individual medley

Chen Qin (born 10 February 1963) is a Chinese former freestyle and medley swimmer who competed in the 1984 Summer Olympics.
