= Mu Lati =

Chinese swimmer (born 1964)

Personal information
- Born: March 12, 1964 (age 62)

Sport
- Sport: Swimming
Medal record
Representing China
Asian Games
Gold medal – first place	1986 Seoul	4x100m freestyle relay

Mu Lati (Chinese: 穆拉提; pinyin: Mù Lā-tí; born 12 March 1964) is a Chinese former freestyle swimmer who competed in the 1984 Summer Olympics.
