= Mircea Bedivan =

Romanian handball player (born 1957)

Medal record

Men's Handball

Representing Romania

Olympic Games
Bronze medal – third place	1984 Los Angeles	Team

Mircea Bedivan (born 8 October 1957 in Constanţa) is a former Romanian handball player who competed in the 1984 Summer Olympics.

He was a member of the Romanian handball team which won the bronze medal. He played all six matches and scored two goals.

After retiring from active play with Dinamo Bucharest, he became a coach, managing CSM Călărași, CSM Ploieşti and Energia Lignitul Pandurii Târgu Jiu.
