= Ju Jixin =

Chinese volleyball player (born 1962)

Zhai Jixin
Personal information
- Nationality: Chinese
- Born: 15 April 1962 (age 62)

Sport
- Sport: Volleyball

Zhai Jixin (born 15 April 1962) is a Chinese volleyball player. He competed in the men's tournament at the 1984 Summer Olympics.
