= Zhang Yousheng =

Chinese volleyball player (born 1956)

Personal information
- Nationality: Chinese
- Born: 5 August 1956 (age 68)

Sport
- Sport: Volleyball

Zhang Yousheng (born 5 August 1956) is a Chinese volleyball player. He competed in the men's tournament at the 1984 Summer Olympics.
