= Park Yang-gae =

South Korean basketball player

- Hangul: 박양계
- RR: Bak Yanggye
- MR: Pak Yanggye

Park Yang-gae
Medal record

Women's basketball

Representing South Korea

Olympic Games
Silver medal – second place	1984 Los Angeles	Team competition

Asian Games
Silver medal – second place	1982 New Delhi	Team competition

Park Yang-Gae (born 10 May 1961) is a South Korean former basketball player who competed in the 1984 Summer Olympics. Her skill in the position of point guard, particularly in passing, earned her the nickname of "computer guard" during her career.
