= Emilija Erčić =

Serbian handball player (born 1962)

Olympic medal record

Women's Handball
Gold medal – first place	1984 Los Angeles	Team

Emilija Erčić (Serbian Cyrillic: Емилија Ерчић, born 14 June 1962 in Belgrade) is a former Yugoslav handball player who competed in the 1984 Summer Olympics.

She was a member of the Yugoslav handball team which won the gold medal. She played three matches and scored two goals.
