= Siegfried Roch =

German handball player (born 1959)

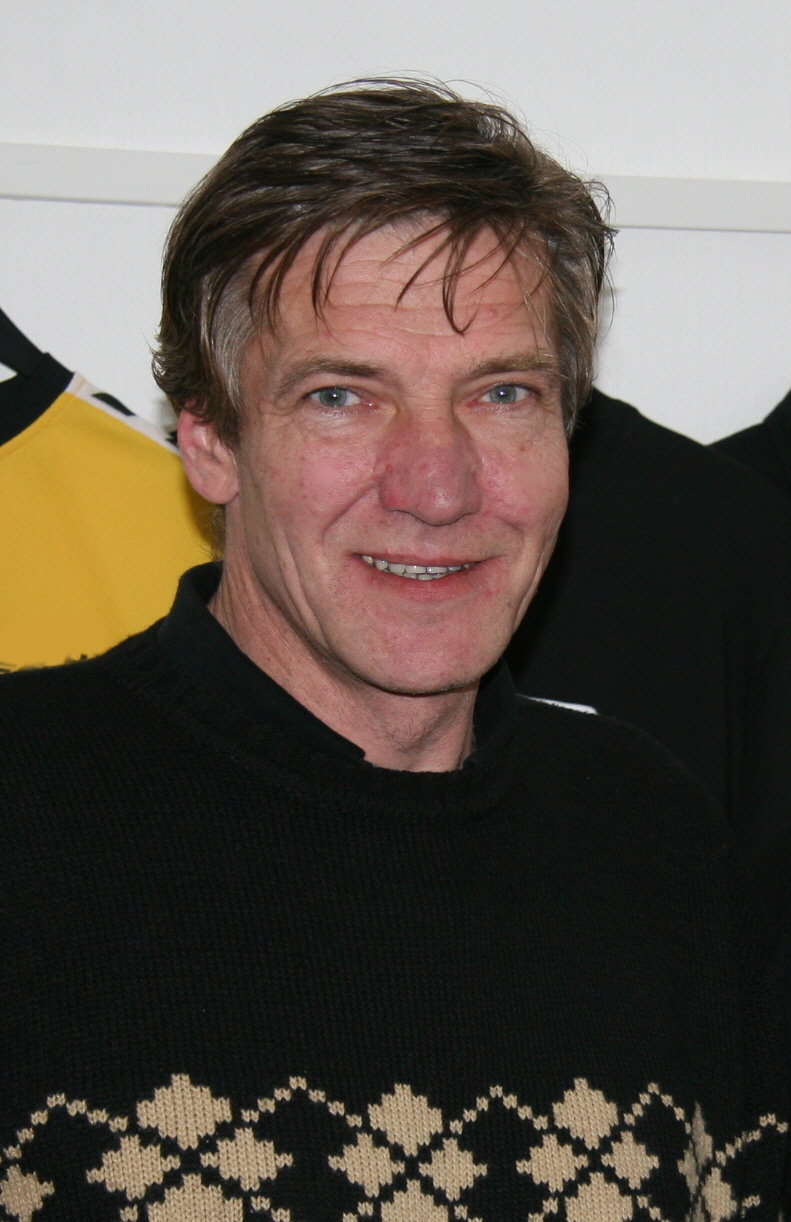
- 2010

Personal information
- Nationality: German
- Born: 26 March 1959 (age 67) Wunsiedel, West Germany
- Height: 1.90 m (6 ft 3 in)

Sport
- Sport: Handball
- Position: Goalkeeper

Senior clubs
- Years: Team
- -1981: TSV Milbertshofen
- 1981-1997: TV Großwallstadt
National team
Years	Team	Apps
–	Germany	38
Medal record
Men's handball
Representing West Germany
Olympic Games
Silver medal – second place	1984 Los Angeles	Team

Siegfried Roch (born 26 March 1959) is a former West German handball player who competed in the 1984 Summer Olympics.

He was a member of the West German handball team which won the silver medal. He played one match as goalkeeper.

He played 16 years for TV Großwallstadt and he is the record appearance maker for the club with 533 total competitive matches. He won the German championship in 1984 and in 1990, and the DHB-Pokal in 1984, 1987 and 1989.
