= Shen Keqin =

Chinese volleyball player (born 1958)

Personal information
- Nationality: Chinese
- Born: 19 May 1958 (age 66)

Sport
- Sport: Volleyball

Shen Keqin (born 19 May 1958) is a Chinese volleyball player. He competed in the men's tournament at the 1984 Summer Olympics.
