= Alenka Cuderman =

Slovenian handball player (born 1961)

Olympic medal record

Women's Handball
Gold medal – first place	1984 Los Angeles	Team

Alenka Cuderman (born June 13, 1961) is a former Yugoslav/Slovenian handball player who competed in the 1984 Summer Olympics.

In 1984 she was a member of the Yugoslav handball team which won the gold medal. She played three matches including the final.
