= Michael Paul (handballer) =

German handball player (born 1961)

Personal information
- Born: 15 April 1961 (age 65) Hanau, West Germany
- Height: 1.95 m (6 ft 5 in)

Sport
- Sport: Handball
- Position: Left back
National team
| Years | Team | Apps | (Gls) |
| – | West Germany | 32 | (72) |
Medal record
Men's handball
Representing West Germany
Olympic Games
| Silver medal – second place | 1984 Los Angeles | Team |

Michael Paul (born 15 April 1961) is a former West German handball player who competed in the 1984 Summer Olympics.

He was a member of the West German handball team which won the silver medal. He played five matches and scored seventeen goals.
