= Jasna Ptujec =

Croatian handball player (born 1959)

Olympic medal record

Women's Handball
Gold medal – first place	1984 Los Angeles	Team

Jasna Ptujec (born 19 January 1959 in Zagreb, Yugoslavia) is a former Yugoslav/Croatian handball player born in Croatian-Slovenian family. who competed in the 1984 Summer Olympics.

She was a member of the Yugoslav handball team which won the gold medal. She played all five matches as goalkeeper.
