= Yan Jianming =

Chinese volleyball player (born 1961)

Personal information
- Nationality: Chinese
- Born: 6 May 1961 (age 63)

Sport
- Sport: Volleyball

Yan Jianming (born 6 May 1961) is a Chinese volleyball player. He competed in the men's tournament at the 1984 Summer Olympics.
