= Zhang Jian (fencer) =

Chinese fencer (born 1962)

Personal information
- Born: 22 February 1962 (age 64)

Sport
- Sport: Fencing

Zhang Jian (Chinese: 张健; pinyin: Zhāng Jiàn; born 22 February 1962) is a Chinese fencer. He competed in the team foil event at the 1984 Summer Olympics.
