= Rüdiger Neitzel =

German handball player (born 1963)

Personal information
- Born: 16 March 1963 (age 63) Solingen, West Germany
- Height: 1.99 m (6 ft 6 in)
Medal record
Men's handball
Representing West Germany
Olympic Games
Silver medal – second place	1984 Los Angeles	Team

Rüdiger Neitzel (born 16 March 1963) is a former West German handball player who competed in the 1984 Summer Olympics. Therefore, he and all players of the team were awarded with the Silver Lorel Leaf, Germany's highest sport award.

He was a member of the West German handball team which won the silver medal. Therefor he was awarded with the Sjlver Laurel Leaf, Germany's highest He played all six matches and scored thirteen goals.

== Biography ==
Neitzel completed his abitur at Gymnasium Schwertstraße before studying medicine at the University of Cologne, and specialises in orthopaedics, sport othopaedics.
