= Feng Dawei =

Chinese swimmer

Personal information
- Born: December 6, 1965 (age 60)

Sport
- Sport: Swimming

Feng Dawei (born 6 December 1965) is a Chinese former swimmer who competed in the 1984 Summer Olympics.
