= Dirk Rauin =

German handball player (born 1957)

Personal information
- Born: 16 March 1957 (age 69) Hückeswagen, West Germany
- Height: 1.81 m (5 ft 11 in)
Medal record
Men's handball
Representing West Germany
Olympic Games
Silver medal – second place	1984 Los Angeles	Team

Dirk Rauin (born 16 March 1957) is a former West German handball player who competed in the 1984 Summer Olympics.

He was a member of the West German handball team which won the silver medal. He played all six matches and scored five goals.
