= Wang Hao (swimmer) =

Chinese swimmer (born 1962)

Personal information
- Born: October 25, 1962 (age 63)

Sport
- Sport: Swimming
- Strokes: Backstroke
Medal record
Representing China
Asian Games
Silver medal – second place	1986 Seoul	4x100m medley relay
Bronze medal – third place	1986 Seoul	100m backstroke

Wang Hao (born 25 October 1962) is a Chinese former swimmer who competed in the 1984 Summer Olympics.
