= Kim Ok-hwa =

South Korean handball player (born 1958)

Medal record

Women's handball

Representing South Korea

Olympic Games
Silver medal – second place	1984 Los Angeles	Team

Kim Ok-Hwa (born August 11, 1958) is a South Korean team handball player and Olympic medalist. She received a silver medal at the 1984 Summer Olympics in Los Angeles.
