= Jeong Hyoi-soon =

South Korean handball player (born 1964)

Medal record

Women's handball

Representing South Korea

Olympic Games
| Silver medal – second place | 1984 Los Angeles | Team |

Jeong Hyoi-Soon (born April 28, 1964) is a South Korean team handball player and Olympic silver medalist. She played for the South Korean team that finished second at the 1984 Summer Olympics in Los Angeles.
