= Lee Young-ja (handballer) =

South Korean handball player (born 1964)

Medal record

Women's handball

Representing South Korea

Olympic Games
Silver medal – second place	1984 Los Angeles	Team

- Lee Young-ja
- Hangul: 이영자
- RR: I Yeongja
- MR: I Yŏngja

Lee Young-ja (Korean: 이영자; born January 5, 1964) is a South Korean team handball player and Olympic medalist. She received a silver medal at the 1984 Summer Olympics in Los Angeles, playing for the South Korean national team.
