= Lee Soon-ei =

South Korean handball player (born 1965)

Medal record

Women's handball

Representing South Korea

Olympic Games
Silver medal – second place	1984 Los Angeles	Team

Lee Soon-Ei (born October 15, 1965) is a South Korean team handball player and Olympic medalist. She played with the South Korean team and received a silver medal at the 1984 Summer Olympics in Los Angeles.
