= Jeung Soon-bok =

South Korean handball player (born 1960)

Medal record

Women's handball

Representing South Korea

Olympic Games
Silver medal – second place	1984 Los Angeles	Team

- Jeung Soon-bok
- Hangul: 정순복
- Hanja: 丁順福
- RR: Jeong Sunbok
- MR: Chŏng Sunbok

Jeung Soon-bok (born August 9, 1960) is a South Korean team handball player and Olympic silver medalist. She played for the South Korean team which finished second at the 1984 Summer Olympics in Los Angeles.
