= Slavica Pecikoza =

Yugoslav and Bosnian basketball player

Personal information
- Born: September 8, 1961 (age 65) Višegrad, SFR Yugoslavia
- Listed height: 1.82 m (6 ft 0 in)
- Listed weight: 80 kg (176 lb)

Slavica Pecikoza (born September 8, 1961) is a Yugoslav and Bosnian former female professional basketball player.

She has a degree in journalism, a master of science in sports, and a degree in football management.

She has been a member of the former Yugoslavia women's national basketball team for many years, with close to 100 caps, participating in the Olympic Games, World Cups and Eurobasket. She played basketball for the Sarajevo clubs ŽKK Bosna Sarajevo and ŽKK Željezničar Sarajevo.

Since her playing days, she worked as a journalist, and was also the editor of the Sports Editorial Office on the Radio of the Federation of Bosnia and Herzegovina.

Pecikoza is a long-standing spokesperson for the Football Association of Bosnia and Herzegovina, and a senior expert associate for PR with the organisation. She is also the first and only Bosnia and Herzegovina representative who acted both as FIFA and as UEFA media officer at the same time. She attended three different FIFA World Cup, as a journalist, a Bosnian team press officer at the World Cup in Brasil, and as a FIFA media officer at the World Cup in Russia.
