= Guo Huaying =

Chinese swimmer

Personal information
- Born: January 2, 1965 (age 61)

Sport
- Sport: Swimming
- Strokes: Backstroke

Guo Huaying (born 2 January 1965) is a Chinese former swimmer who competed in the 1984 Summer Olympics.
