= Ulrich Roth (handballer) =

German handball player (born 1962)

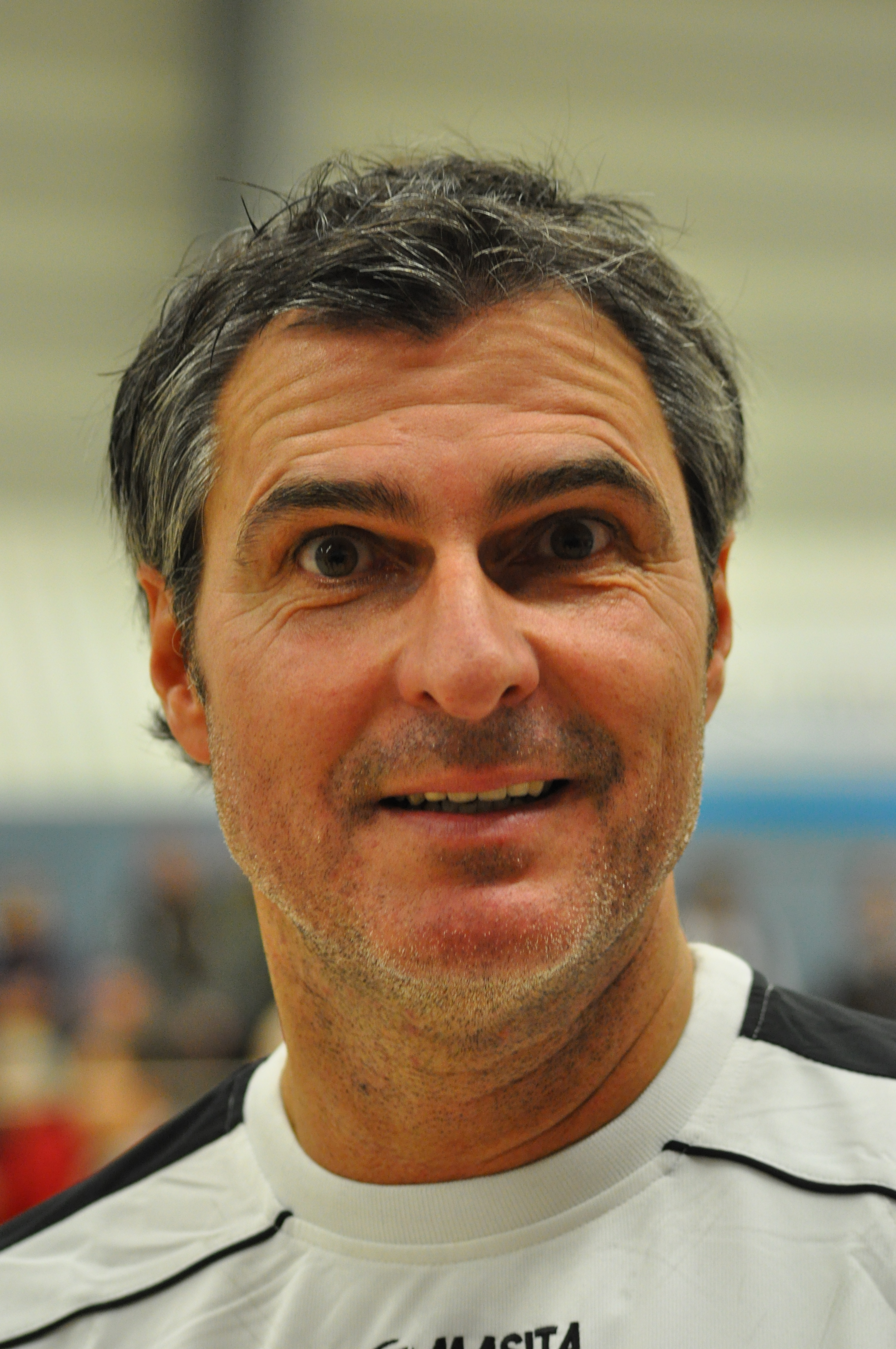

Personal information
- Born: 15 February 1962 (age 64) Heidelberg, Germany
- Height: 1.96 m (6 ft 5 in)
Medal record
Men's handball
Representing West Germany
Olympic Games
| Silver medal – second place | 1984 Los Angeles | Team |

Ulrich Roth (born 15 February 1962) is a former West German handball player who competed in the 1984 Summer Olympics.

He was a member of the West German handball team which won the silver medal. He played all six matches and scored fifteen goals.

His twin brother Michael Roth was also a team member.
