= Thomas Happe =

German handball player (born 1958)

Personal information
- Born: March 25, 1958 (age 68) Dortmund, West Germany
- Height: 1.89 m (6 ft 2 in)
Medal record
Men's handball
Representing West Germany
Olympic Games
Silver medal – second place	1984 Los Angeles	Team

Thomas Happe (born March 25, 1958) is a former West German handball player who competed in the 1984 Summer Olympics.

He was a member of the West German handball team which won the silver medal. He played five matches.

Happe is the son of Olympic swimmer Ursula Happe.
