= Zheng Jian =

Chinese swimmer (born 1963)

Personal information
- Native name: 鄭•健
- Born: October 22, 1963 (age 62)

Sport
- Sport: Swimming
Medal record
Men's swimming
Representing China
Asian Games
Silver medal – second place	1986 Seoul	100m freestyle
Silver medal – second place	1986 Seoul	4 x 100m medley relay

Zheng Jian (born 22 October 1963) is a Chinese former swimmer who competed in the 1984 Summer Olympics and in the 1988 Summer Olympics.
