= Han Hwa-soo =

South Korean handball player (1963–2020)

Personal information
- Born: 3 February 1963
- Died: April 2020 (aged 57)

Han Hwa-soo
Medal record

Women's handball

Representing South Korea

Olympic Games
Silver medal – second place	1984 Los Angeles	Team

- Han Hwa-soo
- Hangul: 한화수
- Hanja: 韓和洙/韓化洙
- RR: Han Hwasu
- MR: Han Hwasu

Han Hwa-Soo (3 February 1963 – April 2020) was a South Korean team handball player and Olympic medalist. She received a silver medal at the 1984 Summer Olympics in Los Angeles. She died in April 2020, at the age of 57.
