= Wang Wei (fencer) =

Chinese fencer

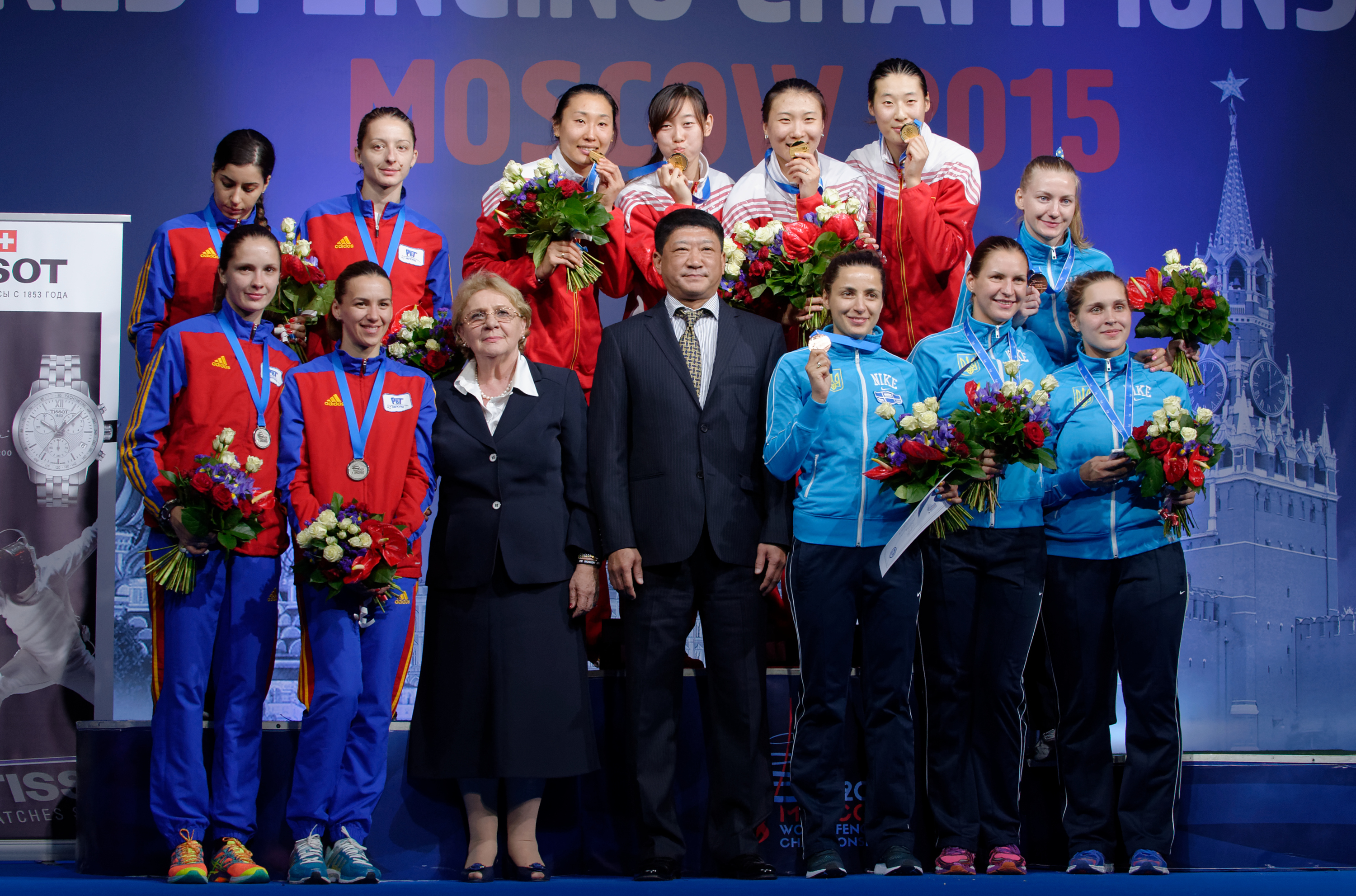

Personal information
- Born: 23 October 1958 (age 67)
- Height: 1.81 m (5 ft 11 in)
- Weight: 73 kg (161 lb)

Fencing career
- Sport: Fencing
- Country: China
- Weapon: foil

Wang Wei (Chinese: 王 偉; pinyin: Wáng wěi; born 23 October 1958) is a Chinese fencer. He competed in the team foil event at the 1984 Summer Olympics. He is now a vice-president of the International Fencing Federation. He represents the executive committee at the SEMI commission.
