= He Jianping =

Chinese handball player (born 1963)

Olympic medal record

Women's Handball
Bronze medal – third place	1984 Los Angeles	Team

He Jianping (simplified Chinese: 何剑平; traditional Chinese: 何劍平; pinyin: Hé Jiànpíng; born May 5, 1963) is a former female Chinese handball player who competed in the 1984 Summer Olympics and in the 1988 Summer Olympics.

In 1984 she was a member of the Chinese handball team which won the bronze medal. She played all five matches and scored eleven goals.

Four years later she was part of the Chinese team which finished sixth. She played all five matches and scored 26 goals.
