= Wang Linwei =

Chinese handball player (born 1956)

Olympic medal record

Women's Handball
Bronze medal – third place	1984 Los Angeles	Team

Wang Linwei (simplified Chinese: 王琳炜; traditional Chinese: 王琳煒; pinyin: Wáng Línwěi; born August 29, 1956) is a former female Chinese handball player who competed in the 1984 Summer Olympics.

She was a member of the Chinese handball team which won the bronze medal. She played all five matches and scored eleven goals.
