= Jeong Myung-hee =

South Korean basketball player

Medal record

Women's basketball

Representing South Korea

Olympic Games
Silver medal – second place	1984 Los Angeles	Team competition

- Jeong Myung-hee
- Hangul: 정명희
- Hanja: 鄭明姫
- RR: Jeong Myeonghui
- MR: Chŏng Myŏnghŭi

Jeong Myung-hee (Korean: 정명희; born 16 May 1964) is a South Korean former basketball player who competed in the 1984 Summer Olympics.
