= Lee Mi-ja (basketball) =

South Korean basketball player

- Hangul: 이미자
- RR: I Mija
- MR: I Mija

Lee Mi-ja
Medal record

Women's basketball

Representing South Korea

Olympic Games
| Silver medal – second place | 1984 Los Angeles | Team competition |

Asian Games
| Silver medal – second place | 1986 Seoul | Team competition |

Lee Mi-ja (born 6 September 1963) is a South Korean former basketball player who competed in the 1984 Summer Olympics.
