= Kim Eun-sook (basketball) =

South Korean basketball player

- Hangul: 김은숙
- Hanja: 金銀淑
- RR: Gim Eunsuk
- MR: Kim Ŭnsuk

Kim Eun-sook
Medal record

Women's basketball

Representing South Korea

Olympic Games
Silver medal – second place	1984 Los Angeles	Team competition

Asian Games
Silver medal – second place	1986 Seoul	Team competition

Kim Eun-sook (born 31 March 1963 in Seoul, South Korea) is a South Korean former basketball player who competed in the 1984 Summer Olympics.
