= Liu Liping =

Chinese handball player (born 1958)

Olympic medal record

Women's Handball
Bronze medal – third place	1984 Los Angeles	Team

Liu Liping (simplified Chinese: 刘莉萍; traditional Chinese: 劉莉萍; pinyin: Liú Lìpíng; born June 1, 1958) is a former Chinese handball player. She competed in the 1984 Summer Olympics.

Liping was a member of the Chinese handball team, which won the bronze medal. She played all five matches and scored fourteen goals.
