= Zhang Weihong =

Chinese handball player (born 1963)

Olympic medal record

Women's Handball
Bronze medal – third place	1984 Los Angeles	Team

Zhang Weihong (simplified Chinese: 张维红; traditional Chinese: 張維紅; pinyin: Zhāng Wéihóng; born January 31, 1963, in Yangquan, Shanxi) is a former female Chinese handball player. She competed in the 1984 Summer Olympics and in the 1988 Summer Olympics.

In 1984, she was a member of the Chinese handball team which won the bronze medal. She played all five matches and scored three goals.

Four years later she was part of the Chinese team which finished sixth. She played all five matches and scored ten goals.
