= Zhang Peijun =

Chinese handball player (born 1958)

Olympic medal record

Women's Handball
Bronze medal – third place	1984 Los Angeles	Team

Zhang Peijun (Chinese: 张佩君; born April 29, 1958) is a former Chinese handball player.

Zhang won a bronze medal at the 1984 Summer Olympics, where she competed in two matches as a member of the Chinese women's handball team. She is currently a pharmaceutical engineering student at University of Florida.
