= Huang Ying (water polo) =

Chinese water polo player

Personal information
- Born: February 14, 1957 (age 69)

Sport
- Sport: Water polo

Huang Ying (黄颖; born 14 February 1957) is a retired Chinese male water polo player who competed at the 1984 Summer Olympics. He later coached the Canadian team at the 2001 Summer Universiade.
