= Chen Zhen (handballer) =

Chinese handball player (born 1963)

Olympic medal record

Women's Handball
Bronze medal – third place	1984 Los Angeles	Team

Chen Zhen (simplified Chinese: 陈珍; traditional Chinese: 陳珍; pinyin: Chén Zhēn; born January 11, 1963) is a former female Chinese handball player who competed in the 1984 Summer Olympics and in the 1988 Summer Olympics.

In 1984, as a member of the Chinese handball team, she played in all 5 matches and scored 19 goals. Her team won the bronze medal.

In 1988, also as a member of the Chinese handball team, she played in all 5 matches and scored 21 goals. Her team finished in sixth place.
