= Li Lan =

Chinese handball player (born 1961)

Olympic medal record

Women's Handball
Bronze medal – third place	1984 Los Angeles	Team

Li Lan (simplified Chinese: 李兰; traditional Chinese: 李蘭; pinyin: Lǐ Lán; born July 12, 1961) is a former Chinese handball player. She competed in the 1984 Summer Olympics.

She was a member of the Chinese handball team which won the bronze medal. She played all five matches and scored nine goals.
