= Li Lingjuan =

Chinese archer (born 1966)

Olympic medal record

Women's Archery
Silver medal – second place	1984 Los Angeles	individual

Li Lingjuan (Chinese: 李玲娟; pinyin: Lǐ Língjuān; born April 10, 1966) was first Chinese woman to win an Olympic medal in archery. She did so in her first appearance at the Olympics in Los Angeles, 1984.
