= Wang Mingxing =

Chinese handball player (born 1961)

Olympic medal record

Women's Handball
Bronze medal – third place	1984 Los Angeles	Team

Wang Mingxing (Chinese: 王明星; pinyin: Wáng Míngxīng; born September 5, 1961) is a former female Chinese handball player who competed in the 1984 Summer Olympics and in the 1988 Summer Olympics.

In 1984 she was a member of the Chinese handball team which won the bronze medal. She played all five matches and scored twenty goals.

Four years later she was part of the Chinese team which finished sixth. She played all five matches and scored three goals.
