= Zhu Juefeng =

Chinese handball player (born 1964)

Olympic medal record

Women's Handball
Bronze medal – third place	1984 Los Angeles	Team

Zhu Juefeng (simplified Chinese: 朱觉凤; traditional Chinese: 朱覺鳳; pinyin: Zhū Juéfèng; born May 5, 1964) is a former female Chinese handball player who competed in the 1984 Summer Olympics.

She was a member of the Chinese handball team which won the bronze medal. She played all five matches and scored ten goals.
