= Wu Xingjiang =

Chinese handball player (born 1957)

Olympic medal record

Women's Handball
Bronze medal – third place	1984 Los Angeles	Team

Wu Xingjiang (Chinese: 武邢江; pinyin: Wǔ Xíngjiāng; born May 25, 1957) is a former Chinese handball player who competed in the 1984 Summer Olympics.

She was a member of the Chinese handball team which won the bronze medal. She played all five matches as goalkeeper.
