= Li Yuwei =

Chinese sport shooter (born 1965)

Medal record

Men's Shooting

Representing China
Gold medal – first place	1984 Los Angeles	50 m Running Target

Li Yuwei (Chinese: 李玉伟; born July 20, 1965, in Shenyang, Liaoning) is a male Chinese sports shooter. He won the 1984 Los Angeles Olympic Games in the 50 m Running Target.

Yuwei attended the University of Central China

== Major performances ==
- 1984 Los Angeles Olympic Games - 1st 50m moving target standard speed
- 1986 World Championships - 1st moving target mixed speed team
- 1987 World Cup - 1st moving target mixed speed (396pts) & standard speed (685pts)
