= Choi Aei-young =

South Korean basketball player

Olympic medal record

Women's basketball

Representing South Korea
Silver medal – second place	1984 Los Angeles	Team competition

- Choi Aei-young
- Hangul: 최애영
- Hanja: 崔愛英
- RR: Choe Aeyeong
- MR: Ch'oe Aeyŏng

Choi Ae-Yeong (25 July 1959 – 14 May 2008) is a South Korean former basketball player who competed in the 1984 Summer Olympics.
