= Xiu Lijuan =

Chinese basketball player

Medal record

Women's basketball

Representing China

Olympic Games
Bronze medal – third place	1984 Los Angeles	Team competition

Asian Games
Gold medal – first place	1982 New Delhi	Team competition

Xiu Lijuan (Chinese: 修丽娟; pinyin: Xiū Lì-juān, born 26 October 1957) is a Chinese former basketball player who competed in the 1984 Summer Olympics.
