= Zhang Yueqin =

Chinese basketball player

Medal record

Women's basketball

Representing China

Olympic Games
Bronze medal – third place	1984 Los Angeles	Team competition

Asian Games
Gold medal – first place	1982 New Delhi	Team competition
Gold medal – first place	1986 Seoul	Team competition

Zhang Yueqin (Chinese: 张月琴; pinyin: Zhāng Yuèqín, born 27 January 1960) is a Chinese former basketball player who competed in the 1984 Summer Olympics.
