= Gao Xiumin (handballer) =

Chinese handball player (born 1963)

Personal information
- Native name: 高秀敏
- Nationality: Chinese
- Born: August 21, 1963 (age 62)
Medal record
Women's Handball
Bronze medal – third place	1984 Los Angeles	Team

Gao Xiumin (Chinese: 高秀敏; pinyin: Gāo Xiùmǐn; born August 21, 1963) is a former female Chinese handball player who competed in the 1984 Summer Olympics.

She was a member of the Chinese handball team which won the bronze medal. She played three matches and scored three goals.
