= Qiu Chen =

Chinese basketball player

Medal record

Women's basketball

Representing China

Olympic Games
Bronze medal – third place	1984 Los Angeles	Team competition

Asian Games
Gold medal – first place	1982 New Delhi	Team competition
Gold medal – first place	1986 Seoul	Team competition

Qiu Chen (Chinese: 邱晨; pinyin: Qiū Chén; born 1 June 1963) is a Chinese former basketball player who competed in the 1984 Summer Olympics.

In 1986, she moved to Australia after meeting Jenny Cheesman and played for the Canberra Capitals in 1988, under the name "Qui Chen." She had chosen to move to Australia because of her desire to learn the English language.
