= Li Xiaoqin =

Chinese basketball player

Medal record

Women's basketball

Representing China

Olympic Games
Bronze medal – third place	1984 Los Angeles	Team competition

Li Xiaoqin (simplified Chinese: 李晓勤; traditional Chinese: 李曉勤; pinyin: Lǐ Xiǎoqín; born 7 December 1961) is a Chinese former basketball player who competed in the 1984 Summer Olympics and in the 1988 Summer Olympics.
