= Zhang Hui (basketball) =

Chinese basketball player

Medal record

Women's basketball

Representing China

Olympic Games
Bronze medal – third place	1984 Los Angeles	Team competition

Asian Games
Gold medal – first place	1982 New Delhi	Team competition

Zhang Hui (Chinese: 张惠, born 29 September 1959) is a Chinese former basketball player who competed in the 1984 Summer Olympics.
