= Wang Jun (basketball) =

Chinese basketball player

Medal record

Women's basketball

Representing China

Olympic Games
Bronze medal – third place	1984 Los Angeles	Team competition

Asian Games
Gold medal – first place	1986 Seoul	Team competition

Wang Jun (王军, born 20 August 1963) is a Chinese former basketball player who competed in the 1984 Summer Olympics.
