= Liu Yumei =

Chinese handball player (born 1961)

Olympic medal record

Women's Handball
Bronze medal – third place	1984 Los Angeles	Team

Liu Yumei (simplified Chinese: 刘玉梅; traditional Chinese: 劉玉梅; pinyin: Liú Yùméi; born July 17, 1961) is a former Chinese handball player who competed in the 1984 Summer Olympics.

She was a member of the Chinese handball team which won the bronze medal. She played all five matches as goalkeeper.
