= Ba Yan =

Chinese basketball player

Olympic medal record

Women's basketball

Representing China
Bronze medal – third place	1984 Los Angeles	Team competition

Ba Yan (Chinese: 巴燕; pinyin: Bā Yàn; born 18 December 1962) is a Chinese former basketball player who competed in the 1984 Summer Olympics.
