= Handball at the 1984 Summer Olympics – Women's tournament =

Handball at the Olympics

1984 Women's Olympic handball tournament
Tournament details
- Host country: United States
- Venue: 1 (in 1 host city)
- Dates: August 1–9, 1984
- Teams: 6

Final positions
- Champions: Yugoslavia (1st title)
- Runners-up: South Korea
- Third place: China
- Fourth place: West Germany

Tournament statistics
- Matches played: 15
- Top scorer(s): (Socialist Federal Republic of Yugoslavia) Jasna Kolar-Merdan (48 goals)

The women's tournament was one of two handball tournaments at the 1984 Summer Olympics. It was the third appearance of a women's handball tournament at the Olympic Games.

== Summary ==
Place	Nation
1	Yugoslavia
	Coach: Josip Samaržija; Svetlana Anastasovska (ORK Beograd); Alenka Cuderman (Olimpija Ljubljana); Svetlana Dašić-Kitić (Radnički Beograd); Slavica Đukić (Radnički Beograd); Dragica Đurić (Radnički Beograd); Mirjana Đurica (Radnički Beograd); Emilija Erčić (Radnički Beograd); Ljubinka Janković (Radnički Beograd); Jasna Kolar-Merdan (Lokomotiva Mostar); Ljiljana Mugoša (Budućnost Titograd); Svetlana Mugoša (Budućnost Titograd); Mirjana Ognjenović (Lokomotiva Zagreb); Zorica Pavićević (Budućnost Titograd); Jasna Ptujec (Lokomotiva Zagreb); Biserka Višnjić (Trešnjevka Zagreb)
2	South Korea
	Han Hwa-Soo; Jeong Hyoi-Soon; Jeung Soon-Bok; Kim Choon-Rye; Kim Kyung-Soon; Kim Mi-sook; Kim Ok-Hwa; Lee Soon-Ei; Lee Young-Ja; Shon Mi-Na; Sung Kyung-Hwa; Yoon Byung-Soon; Yoon Soo-Kyung
3	China
	Chen Zhen; Gao Xiumin; He Jianping; Li Lan; Liu Liping; Liu Yumei; Sun Xiulan; Wang Linwei; Wang Mingxing; Wu Xingjiang; Zhang Weihong; Zhang Peijun; Zhu Juefeng
4	West Germany Maike Becker; Elke Blumauer; Sabine Erbs; Astrid Huhn; Kerstin Jonsson; Sabrina Koschella; Corinna Kunze; Roswitha Mroczynski; Petra Platen; Vanadis Putzke; Silvia Schmitt; Dagmar Stelberg; Claudia Sturm
5	United States Coach: Klement Capilar; Pamela Boyd; Reita Clanton; Theresa Contos; Sandra de la Riva; Mary Dwight; Carmen Forest; Melinda Hale; Leora Jones; Carol Lindsey; Cynthia Stinger; Penelope Stone; Janice Trombly; Sherry Winn Dorothy Franco-Reed; Kim Howard
6	Austria Gabriele Gebauer; Milena Gschiessl-Foltyn; Karin Hillinger; Ulrike Huber; Martina Neubauer; Gudrun Neunteufel; Ulrike Popp; Karin Prokop; Vesna Radovic; Silvia Steinbauer; Maria Sykora; Monika Unger; Susanne Unger; Elisabeth Zehetner; Teresa Zielewicz

== Results ==
Rank	Team	Pld	W	D	L	GF	GA	Pts
Gold	Yugoslavia	5	5	0	0	143	102	10
Silver	South Korea	5	3	1	1	125	119	7
Bronze	China	5	2	1	2	112	115	5
4.	West Germany	5	2	0	3	91	100	4
5.	United States	5	2	0	3	114	123	4
6.	Austria	5	0	0	5	91	117	0

1 August 1984; 18:30	South Korea	23–22	Austria	Titan Gym; Referees: Christensen, Wøhlk (DEN)
1 August 1984; 18:30	Kim 8	(11–15)	Gschiessl 8	Titan Gym; Referees: Christensen, Wøhlk (DEN)
1 August 1984; 18:30	1× (yellow card) 3× (suspension)		2× (yellow card) 4× (suspension)	Titan Gym; Referees: Christensen, Wøhlk (DEN)

1 August 1984; 20:00	Yugoslavia	20–19	West Germany	Titan Gym; Referees: Szendrey, Somhegy (HUN)
1 August 1984; 20:00	Kolar-Merdan 10	(11–12)	Kunze, Platen 4	Titan Gym; Referees: Szendrey, Somhegy (HUN)
1 August 1984; 20:00	3× (yellow card) 1× (suspension)		3× (yellow card) 1× (suspension)	Titan Gym; Referees: Szendrey, Somhegy (HUN)

1 August 1984; 21:30	United States	25–22	China	Titan Gym; Referees: Marin, Serban (ROU)
1 August 1984; 21:30	Stinger 7	(9–12)	He J., Zhu J. 4	Titan Gym; Referees: Marin, Serban (ROU)
1 August 1984; 21:30	4× (yellow card) 7× (suspension) 1× (red card)		3× (yellow card) 6× (suspension)	Titan Gym; Referees: Marin, Serban (ROU)

3 August 1984; 18:30	Yugoslavia	30–15	Austria	Titan Gym; Referees: Rauchfuß, Buchda (GDR)
3 August 1984; 18:30	Kolar-Merdan 7	(15–8)	Zielewicz 6	Titan Gym; Referees: Rauchfuß, Buchda (GDR)
3 August 1984; 18:30	3× (yellow card) 6× (suspension)		3× (yellow card) 4× (suspension)	Titan Gym; Referees: Rauchfuß, Buchda (GDR)

3 August 1984; 20:00	China	20–19	West Germany	Titan Gym; Referees: Nilsson, Wester (SWE)
3 August 1984; 20:00	Wang M. 6	(11–8)	Jönßon 6	Titan Gym; Referees: Nilsson, Wester (SWE)
3 August 1984; 20:00	3× (yellow card) 7× (suspension)		2× (yellow card) 4× (suspension)	Titan Gym; Referees: Nilsson, Wester (SWE)

3 August 1984; 21:30	South Korea	29–27	United States	Titan Gym; Referees: Ischer, Rykart (SUI)
3 August 1984; 21:30	Yoon 9	(16–11)	Jones 9	Titan Gym; Referees: Ischer, Rykart (SUI)
3 August 1984; 21:30	3× (yellow card) 6× (suspension)		3× (yellow card) 7× (suspension)	Titan Gym; Referees: Ischer, Rykart (SUI)

5 August 1984; 18:30	West Germany	18–17	Austria	Titan Gym; Referees: Ischer, Rykart (SUI)
5 August 1984; 18:30	three players 3	(7–5)	Gschiessl 7	Titan Gym; Referees: Ischer, Rykart (SUI)
5 August 1984; 18:30	3× (yellow card) 4× (suspension)		4× (yellow card) 2× (suspension)	Titan Gym; Referees: Ischer, Rykart (SUI)

5 August 1984; 20:00	China	24–24	South Korea	Titan Gym; Referees: Anthonsen, Bolstad (NOR)
5 August 1984; 20:00	Liu L. 7	(10–14)	Yoon 6	Titan Gym; Referees: Anthonsen, Bolstad (NOR)
5 August 1984; 20:00	1× (yellow card) 3× (suspension)		2× (yellow card)	Titan Gym; Referees: Anthonsen, Bolstad (NOR)

5 August 1984; 21:30	Yugoslavia	33–20	United States	Titan Gym; Referees: Anthonsen, Bolstad (NOR)
5 August 1984; 21:30	Kolar-Merdan 17	(14–10)	Stinger 11	Titan Gym; Referees: Anthonsen, Bolstad (NOR)
5 August 1984; 21:30	2× (yellow card) 5× (suspension)		2× (yellow card) 6× (suspension) 1× (red card)	Titan Gym; Referees: Anthonsen, Bolstad (NOR)

7 August 1984; 18:30	China	21–16	Austria	Titan Gym; Referees: Lelong, Tancrez (FRA)
7 August 1984; 18:30	Wang L., Chen Z. 4	(10–7)	Gschiessl 9	Titan Gym; Referees: Lelong, Tancrez (FRA)
7 August 1984; 18:30	2× (yellow card) 3× (suspension)		2× (yellow card) 4× (suspension)	Titan Gym; Referees: Lelong, Tancrez (FRA)

7 August 1984; 20:00	Yugoslavia	29–23	South Korea	Titan Gym; Referees: Marin, Serban (ROU)
7 August 1984; 20:00	Kolar-Merdan 8	(15–14)	Sung 5	Titan Gym; Referees: Marin, Serban (ROU)
7 August 1984; 20:00	2× (yellow card) 5× (suspension)		2× (yellow card) 5× (suspension)	Titan Gym; Referees: Marin, Serban (ROU)

7 August 1984; 21:30	West Germany	18–17	United States	Titan Gym; Referees: Koppe, Nusser (NED)
7 August 1984; 21:30	Schmitt 7	(10–7)	Jones 8	Titan Gym; Referees: Koppe, Nusser (NED)
7 August 1984; 21:30	2× (yellow card) 6× (suspension)		3× (yellow card) 6× (suspension)	Titan Gym; Referees: Koppe, Nusser (NED)

9 August 1984; 18:30	United States	25–21	Austria	Titan Gym; Referees: Christensen, Wøhlk (DEN)
9 August 1984; 18:30	Stinger 10	(11–9)	Gschiessl 5	Titan Gym; Referees: Christensen, Wøhlk (DEN)
9 August 1984; 18:30	2× (yellow card) 4× (suspension)		1× (yellow card) 2× (suspension)	Titan Gym; Referees: Christensen, Wøhlk (DEN)

9 August 1984; 20:00	South Korea	26–17	West Germany	Titan Gym; Referees: Lelong, Tancrez (FRA)
9 August 1984; 20:00	Yoon 16	(11–9)	Stelberg 8	Titan Gym; Referees: Lelong, Tancrez (FRA)
9 August 1984; 20:00	2× (yellow card) 1× (suspension)		1× (yellow card)	Titan Gym; Referees: Lelong, Tancrez (FRA)

9 August 1984; 21:30	Yugoslavia	31–25	China	Titan Gym; Referees: Koppe, Nusser (NED)
9 August 1984; 21:30	Jasna Kolar-Merdan 7	(15–15)	three players 5	Titan Gym; Referees: Koppe, Nusser (NED)
9 August 1984; 21:30	2× (yellow card) 5× (suspension)		1× (yellow card) 3× (suspension)	Titan Gym; Referees: Koppe, Nusser (NED)
