= Austria at the 1984 Summer Olympics =

- IOC code: AUT
- NOC: Austrian Olympic Committee

in Los Angeles, United States July 28, 1984 – August 12, 1984
- Competitors: 102 (71 men and 31 women) in 18 sports
- Flag bearer: Hubert Raudaschl
- Medals Ranked 22nd: Gold 1 Silver 1 Bronze 1 Total 3

Summer Olympics appearances (overview)
- 1896; 1900; 1904; 1908; 1912; 1920; 1924; 1928; 1932; 1936; 1948; 1952; 1956; 1960; 1964; 1968; 1972; 1976; 1980; 1984; 1988; 1992; 1996; 2000; 2004; 2008; 2012; 2016; 2020; 2024

Other related appearances
- 1906 Intercalated Games

Austria competed at the 1984 Summer Olympics in Los Angeles, United States. 102 competitors, 71 men and 31 women, took part in 72 events in 18 sports.

== Medalists ==
Medal	Name	Sport	Event	Date
Gold	Peter Seisenbacher	Judo	Men's 86 kg	8 August
Silver	Andreas Kronthaler	Shooting	Men's 10 metre air rifle	3 August
Bronze	Josef Reiter	Judo	Men's 65 kg	5 August

== Archery ==
In its third appearance in archery competition at the Olympics, Austria again entered only one competitor. This time, however, it was the first Austrian woman to compete in Olympic archery.

Women's Individual Competition

- Ursula Valenta — 2395 points (→ 32nd place)

== Athletics ==
Men's Marathon

- Gerhard Hartmann
  - Final — did not finish (→ no ranking)

Men's Decathlon

- Georg Werthner
  - Final — 8028 points (→ 9th place)

Men's 20 km Walk

- Martin Toporek
  - Final — 1:33:58 (→ 29th place)

Men's Hammer Throw

- Johann Lindner
  - Qualification — 71.28 m (→ did not advance)

Men's Shot Put

- Erwin Weitzl
  - Qualifying Round — 18.96 m (→ did not advance)

== Boxing ==
Men's Welterweight (– 67 kg)

- Konrad König
  1. First Round — Bye
  2. Second Round — Lost to Khemais Refai (Tunisia), RSC-1

Men's Super Heavyweight (+ 91 kg)

- Olaf Mayer
  1. First Round — Lost to Peter Hussing (West Germany), 0:5

== Cycling ==
Nine cyclists, seven men and two women, represented Austria in 1984.

Men's individual road race

- Helmut Wechselberger
- Kurt Zellhofer
- Johann Traxler
- Paul Popp

Team time trial

- Karl Krenauer
- Hans Lienhart
- Peter Muckenhuber
- Helmut Wechselberger

1000m time trial

- Paul Popp

Individual pursuit

- Karl Krenauer

Points race

- Kurt Zellhofer
- Paul Popp

Women's individual road race

- Johanna Hack → 26th place
- Hilde Dobiasch → 38th place

== Fencing ==
Eight fencers, all men, represented Austria in 1984.

Men's foil

- Robert Blaschka
- Joachim Wendt
- Georg Somloi

Men's team foil

- Joachim Wendt, Dieter Kotlowski, Georg Somloi, Robert Blaschka, Georg Loisel

Men's épée

- Arno Strohmeyer
- Hannes Lembacher

Men's sabre

- Hanns Brandstätter

== Handball ==
Women's Team Competition

- Team Roster
  - Ulrike Popp
  - Martina Neubauer
  - Susanne Unger
  - Milena Gschiessl-Foltyn
  - Maria Sykora
  - Sylvia Steinbauer
  - Karin Hillinger
  - Elisabeth Zehetner
  - Gabriele Gebauer
  - Vesna Radovic
  - Teresa Zielewicz
  - Monika Unger

== Modern pentathlon ==
Three male pentathletes represented Austria in 1984.

Men's Individual Competition:

- Michael Billwein — 4760 points (→ 32nd place)
- Ingo Peirits — 3682 points (→ 51st place)
- Horst Stocker — 3432 points (→ 52nd place)

Men's Team Competition:

- Billwein, Peirits, and Stocker — 11874 points (→ 17th place)

== Sailing ==
Men

Athlete	Event	Race							Net points	Final rank
Athlete	Event	1	2	3	4	5	6	7	Net points	Final rank
Bjoern Eybl	Windglider	11	10	~~YMP~~	10	5	7	6	80.0	8

Open

Athlete	Event	Race							Net points	Final rank
Athlete	Event	1	2	3	4	5	6	7	Net points	Final rank
Gerhard Panuschka; Manfred Panuschka	Flying Dutchman	13	4	16	13	~~15~~	15	11	105.0	16
Norbert Petschel; Walter Schlagbauer	Tornado	9	9	10	~~16~~	11	11	4	88.0	12
Hubert Raudaschl; Karl Ferstl	Star	6	~~13~~	1	11	10	3	2	53.4	5
Michael Farthofer; Christian Holler; Richard Holler	Soling	12	11	14	14	11	~~RET~~	15	113.0	15

== Shooting ==
Men

Athlete	Event	Final	
Athlete	Event	Score	Rank
Lothar Heinrich	50 m rifle three positions	1139	22
Lothar Heinrich	50 m rifle prone	589	25
Gerhard Krimbacher	50 m rifle three positions	1135	26
Gerhard Krimbacher	10 m air rifle	573	28
Andreas Kronthaler	10 m air rifle	587	Silver medal
Gerhard Petritsch	25 m rapid fire pistol	589	11
Vinzenz Schweighofer	50 m pistol	555	11

Women

Athlete	Event	Final	
Athlete	Event	Score	Rank
Karin Bauer	50 m rifle three positions	564	15
Karin Bauer	10 m air rifle	379	18
Gudrun Sinnhuber	10 m air rifle	381	11

Open

Athlete	Event	Final	
Athlete	Event	Score	Rank
Martin Burkert	Skeet	189	26
Ludwig Puser	Trap	185	14
Nicky Szapáry	Skeet	192	13

== Swimming ==
Men's 100m Freestyle

- Alexander Pilhatsch
  - Heat — 52.25 (→ did not advance, 25th place)

Men's 100m Breaststroke

- Thomas Böhm
  - Heat — 1:04.60
  - B-Final — 1:04.99 (→ 13th place)
- Gerhard Prohaska
  - Heat — 1:06.41 (→ did not advance, 30th place)

Men's 200m Breaststroke

- Thomas Böhm
  - Heat — 2:22.17
  - B-Final — 2:22.09 (→ 14th place)
- Gerhard Prohaska
  - Heat — 2:27.85 (→ did not advance, 30th place)

Men's 200m Individual Medley

- Alexander Pilhatsch
  - Heat — DNS (→ did not advance, no ranking)

Women's 200m Butterfly

- Sonja Hausladen
  - Heat — 2:13.50
  - Final — 2:15.38 (→ 7th place)
- Brigitte Wanderer
  - Heat — 2:21.16 (→ did not advance, 23rd place)

Women's 200m Individual Medley

- Brigitte Wanderer
  - Heat — 2:26.85 (→ did not advance, 20th place)

Women's 400m Individual Medley

- Sonja Hausladen
  - Heat — 4:58.68
  - B-Final — 4:57.78 (→ 13th place)
- Monika Bayer
  - Heat — 5:05.61 (→ did not advance, 17th place)
