= South Korea at the 1984 Summer Olympics =

- IOC code: KOR
- NOC: Korean Olympic Committee

in Los Angeles
- Competitors: 175 (116 men and 59 women) in 19 sports
- Flag bearer: Ha Hyung-joo
- Medals Ranked 10th: Gold 6 Silver 6 Bronze 7 Total 19

Summer Olympics appearances (overview)
- 1948; 1952; 1956; 1960; 1964; 1968; 1972; 1976; 1980; 1984; 1988; 1992; 1996; 2000; 2004; 2008; 2012; 2016; 2020; 2024; 2028

South Korea, as Korea, competed at the 1984 Summer Olympics in Los Angeles, United States. The nation returned to the Summer Games after participating in the American-led boycott of the 1980 Summer Olympics. 175 competitors, 116 men and 59 women, took part in 97 events in 19 sports. As the country hosted the next Olympics in Seoul, a traditional Korean segment was performed at the closing ceremony.

== Medalists ==
Medal	Name	Sport	Event	Date
Gold	Kim Weon-kee	Wrestling	Men's Greco-Roman 62 kg	1 August
Gold	Ahn Byeong-keun	Judo	Men's 71 kg	6 August
Gold	Ha Hyung-joo	Judo	Men's 95 kg	9 August
Gold	Seo Hyang-soon	Archery	Women's individual	11 August
Gold	Shin Joon-sup	Boxing	Men's Middleweight	11 August
Gold	You In-tak	Wrestling	Men's freestyle 68 kg	11 August
Silver	Kim Jae-yup	Judo	Men's 60 kg	4 August
Silver	Hwang Jung-oh	Judo	Men's 65 kg	5 August
Silver	South Korea women's national handball team: Yoon Soo-kyung; Son Mi-na; Sung Kyung-hwa; Yoon Byung-soon; Kim Ok-hwa; Lee Soon-ei; Lee Young-ja; Kim Choon-rye; Kim Kyung-soon; Kim Mi-sook; Han Hwa-soo; Jeong Hyoi-soon; Jeung Soon-bok	Handball	Women's tournament	9 August
Silver	South Korea women's national basketball team: Park Chan-sook; Park Yang-gae; Sung Jung-a; Lee Hyung-sook; Lee Mi-ja; Moon Kyung-ja; Kim Eun-sook; Kim Hwa-soon; Kim Young-hee; Choi Aei-young; Choi Kyung-hee; Jeong Myung-hee	Basketball	Women's tournament	10 August
Silver	Kim Jong-kyu	Wrestling	Men's freestyle 52 kg	10 August
Silver	An Young-su	Boxing	Men's Welterweight	11 August
Bronze	Bang Dae-du	Wrestling	Men's Greco-Roman 52 kg	2 August
Bronze	Son Gab-do	Wrestling	Men's freestyle 48 kg	9 August
Bronze	Lee Jung-keun	Wrestling	Men's freestyle 62 kg	9 August
Bronze	Cho Yong-chul	Judo	Men's +95 kg	10 August
Bronze	Kim Jin-Ho	Archery	Women's individual	11 August
Bronze	Chun Chil-sung	Boxing	Men's Lightweight	11 August
Bronze	Kim Eui-kon	Wrestling	Men's freestyle 57 kg	11 August

== Archery ==
Korea's second appearance in Olympic archery was highly successful, especially for the women's team. Seo Hyang-soon (서향순) set new Olympic records in both the single and double FITA round categories. The Korean medalists were separated by only 13 points, while the fourth place competitor was 31 points behind Kim Jin-ho (김진호).

Women's Individual Competition

- Seo Hyang-soon (서향순) — 2568 points (→ Gold Medal and Olympic Record)
- Kim Jin-ho (김진호) — 2555 points (→ Bronze Medal)
- Park Young-sook (박영숙) — 2445 points (→ 17th place)

Men's Individual Competition

- Koo Ja-chung (구자중) — 2500 points (→ 8th place)
- Choi Won-tae (최원태) — 2490 points (→ 11th place)
- Jeon In-su (전인수) — 2467 points (→ 22nd place)

== Athletics ==
Men's 100 metres

- Sim Deok-seop

Men's 200 metres

- Jang Jae-geun

Men's 800 metres

- Kim Bok-joo

Men's 1,500 metres

- Kim Bok-joo

Men's Marathon

- Lee Hong-yul — 2:20:56 (→ 37th place)
- Hong Nak-chae — 2:23:33 (→ 48th place)
- Kim Won-sick — 2:30:57 (→ 58th place)

Men's 3,000 metres Steeplechase

- Kim Ju-ryong

Men's Triple Jump

- Park Yeong-jun

Men's Long Jump

- Kim Jong-il

- Qualification — 7.86m
- Final — 7.81m (→ 8th place)

Women's 100 metres

- Lee Young-sook

- First Heat — 12.06s (→ did not advance)

Women's 200 metres

- Mo Myeong-hui

== Basketball ==
Women's Team Competition

- Preliminary Round

- Defeated Canada (67-62)
- Defeated Yugoslavia (55-52)
- Lost to United States (47-84)
- Defeated Australia (54-48)
- Defeated PR China (69-56)

- Final

- Lost to United States (55-85) → Silver Medal

- Team Roster

- Park Chan-sook
- Park Yang-gae
- Sung Jung-a
- Lee Hyung-sook
- Lee Mi-ja
- Moon Kyung-ja
- Kim Eun-sook
- Kim Hwa-soon
- Kim Young-hee
- Choi Aei-young
- Choi Kyung-hee
- Jeong Myung-hee

== Boxing ==
Men's Light Flyweight (–48 kg)

- Kim Kwang-sun

- First Round — Lost to Paul Gonzales (United States), on points (0:5)

Men's Flyweight (–51 kg)

- Heo Yeong-mo

Men's Bantamweight (–54 kg)

- Moon Sung-kil

- First Round — Bye
- Second Round — Defeated John Hyland (Great Britain), retired in third round
- Third Round — Defeated Robert Shannon (United States), referee stopped contest in third round
- Quarterfinals — Lost to Pedro Nolasco (Dominican Republic), referee stopped contest in first round

Men's Featherweight (–57 kg)

- Park Hyeong-ok

Men's Lightweight (–60 kg)

- Jeon Chil-seong

Men's Light-Welterweight (–63.5 kg)

- Kim Dong-gil

Men's Welterweight (–67 kg)

- An Yeong-su

Men's Light-Middleweight (–71 kg)

- An Dal-ho

Men's Middleweight (–75 kg)

- Shin Joon-sup → Gold Medal

- First Round — Defeated Patrick Lihanda (Uganda), on points (5:0)
- Second Round — Defeated Rick Duff (Canada), on points (4:1)
- Quarterfinals — Defeated Jeremiah Okorodudu (Nigeria), on points (4:1)
- Semifinals — Defeated Arístides González (Puerto Rico), on points (4:1)
- Final — Defeated Virgil Hill (United States), on points (3:2)

== Cycling ==
Nine cyclists, six men and three women, represented South Korea in 1984.

Men's individual road race

- Park Se-ryong
- Kim Cheol-seok
- Lee Jin-ok
- Sin Dae-cheol

Team time trial

- Jo Geon-haeng
- Jang Yun-ho
- Kim Cheol-seok
- Lee Jin-ok

Women's individual road race

- Choi Eun-suk → 42nd place
- Mun Suk → 43rd place
- Son Yak-seon → 44th place

== Diving ==
Men's 10m Platform

- Park Jong-ryong

== Fencing ==
Seven fencers, five men and two women, represented South Korea in 1984.

Men's épée

- Kim Seong-mun
- Yun Nam-jin
- Lee Il-hui

Men's team épée

- Kim Bong-man, Kim Seong-mun, Lee Il-hui, Min Gyeong-seung, Yun Nam-jin

Women's foil

- O Seung-sun
- Choi Bok-ran

== Handball ==
Men's Team Competition

- Preliminary Round (Group B)

- Lost to West Germany (25:37)
- Lost to Denmark (31:28)
- Lost to Sweden (23:36)
- Lost to Spain (25:31)
- Drew with United States (22:22)

- Classification Match

- 11th/12th place: Defeated Algeria (25:21) → 11th place

- Team Roster

- An Jin-soo
- Choi Geun-yeon
- Choi Tai-sub
- Hwang Yo-na
- Kang Duck-soo
- Kang Jae-won
- Kang Tae-koo
- Koh Suk-chang
- Lee Kwang-nam
- Lee Sang-hyo
- Lim Kyu-ha
- Lim Young-chul
- Park Byung-hong
- Park Young-dae
- Shim Jung-man

Women's Team Competition

- Team Roster

- Kim Kyung-soon
- Lee Soon-ei
- Jeong Hyoi-soon
- Kim Mi-sook
- Han Hwa-soo
- Kim Ok-hwa
- Kim Choon-rye
- Jeung Soon-bok
- Yoon Byung-soon
- Lee Young-ja
- Sung Kyung-hwa
- Yoon Soo-kyung

== Modern pentathlon ==
Three male modern pentathletes represented South Korea in 1984.

Individual

- Jeong Gyeong-hun
- Kim Il
- Gang Gyeong-hyo

Team

- Jeong Gyeong-hun
- Kim Il
- Gang Gyeong-hyo

== Shooting ==
Twenty South Korean shooters (twelve men and six women) qualified to compete in the following events:

Men

Athlete	Event	Final	
Athlete	Event	Points	Rank
Yang Chung-Yeol	25 m rapid fire pistol	590	5
Park Dae-Un	10 m air rifle	573	28
Yun Deok-Ha	50 m rifle prone	592	13
Yun Deok-Ha	50 m rifle 3 positions	1127	32
Yun Deok-Ha	10 m air rifle	563	38
Lee Eun-chul	50 m rifle 3 positions	1117	39
Seo In-Taek	50 m pistol	553	16
Gwak Jeong-Hun	50 m rifle prone	584	44
Park Jong-Gil	25 m rapid fire pistol	590	7
Park Seung-Rin	50 m pistol	539	31

Women

Athlete	Event	Final	
Athlete	Event	Points	Rank
Kim Hye-Yeong	25 m pistol	573	14
Park Jeong-A	10 m air rifle	381	11
Lee Jeong-Hwa	10 m air rifle	377	21
Mun Yang-Ja	25 m pistol	576	10
Go Yeong-Hui	50 m rifle three positions	552	24
Kim Yeong-Mi	50 m rifle three positions	558	20

Open

Athlete	Event	Final	
Athlete	Event	Points	Rank
Park Cheol-Seung	Trap	186	11
Im Dong-Gi	Skeet	187	33
Choi Jeong-yong	Trap	175	41
Kim Yeong-Jin	Skeet	186	36

== Swimming ==
Men's 100m Butterfly

- Bang Jun-young

- Heat — 58.91 (→ did not advance, 39th place)

Men's 200m Butterfly

- Bang Jun-young

- Heat — 2:07.80 (→ did not advance, 27th place)

Women's 100m Freestyle

- Kim Jin-sook

- Heat — 1:00.91 (→ did not advance, 30th place)

Women's 200m Freestyle

- Kim Jin-sook

- Heat — 2:13.76 (→ did not advance, 29th place)

Women's 100m Backstroke

- Choi Yun-hee

- Heat — 1:07.35 (→ did not advance, 24th place)

Women's 200m Backstroke

- Choi Yun-hee

- Heat — 2:23.80 (→ did not advance, 21st place)

== Tennis ==
Women's individual (demonstration event)

- Susanna Lee

== Volleyball ==
Men's Team Competition

- Preliminary Round (Group A)

- Defeated Tunisia (3-0)
- Lost to United States (0-3)
- Defeated Brazil (3-1)
- Defeated Argentina (3-2)

- Classification Matches

- 5th/8th place: Defeated China (3-1)
- 5th/6th place: Defeated Argentina (3-1) → 5th place

- Team Roster

- Lee Jong-kyung
- Kang Doo-tae
- Chang Yoon-chang
- Lee Yong-bun
- Lee Bum-joo
- Yang Jin-wung
- Moon Yong-kwan
- Yoo Joong-tak
- Kim Ho-chul
- No Jin-su
- Kang Man-soo
- Chung Euy-tak

Women's Team Competition

- Preliminary Round (Pool A)

- South Korea — Japan 1-3 (15-8, 11-15, 2-15, 7-15)
- South Korea — Canada 3-0 (15-10, 15-1, 15-3)
- South Korea — Peru 2-3 (8-15, 6-15, 15-7, 15-6, 3-15)

- Classification Match

- 5th-8th place: South Korea — Brazil 3-1 (13-15, 15-13, 15-9, 15-10)
- 5th-6th place: South Korea — West Germany 3-0 (15-10, 15-10, 15-2) → Fifth place

- Team Roster

- Lee Eun-kyung (이은경)
- Lee Un-yim (이은임)
- Jin Chun-mae (진전매)
- Lee Young-sun (이영순)
- Kim Jeong-sun (김정순)
- Jae Sook-ja (제숙자)
- Han Kyung-ae (한경애)
- Lee Myung-hee (이명희)
- Kim Ok-sun (김옥순)
- Park Mi-hee (박미희)
- Lim Hye-sook (임혜숙)
- Yoon Chung-hae (윤정해)
