= Judo at the 1984 Summer Olympics – Men's 65 kg =

Judo competition

Men's 65 kg at the Games of the XXIII Olympiad
- Venue: California State University, Los Angeles
- Date: 5 August 1984
- Competitors: 34 from 34 nations

Medalists
1st place, gold medalist(s)		Yoshiyuki Matsuoka	Japan
2nd place, silver medalist(s)		Hwang Jung-oh	South Korea
3rd place, bronze medalist(s)		Marc Alexandre	France
3rd place, bronze medalist(s)		Josef Reiter	Austria

The men's 65 kg competition in judo at the 1984 Summer Olympics in Los Angeles was held on 5 August at the California State University. The gold medal was won by Yoshiyuki Matsuoka of Japan.

== Results ==
=== Pool A ===
Round of 64
Yoshiyuki Matsuoka (JPN)	W
Jörgen Häggqvist (SWE)	R
Adel Al-Najadah (KUW)	E
Brad Farrow (CAN)	W

Round of 32
Yoshiyuki Matsuoka (JPN)	W
Philip Laats (BEL)	R
Stephen Gawthorpe (GBR)	W
Rui Rosa (POR)	E
Juan Chalas (DOM)	DNS
Bienvenu Mbida (CGO)	WO
Constantin Niculae (ROU)	W
Gerardo Padilla (MEX)	E
Brad Farrow (CAN)	W
Jesskiel Bikidick (CMR)	E
Marc Alexandre (FRA)	W
Max Narváez (PAR)	E
Jihad El-Achkar (LIB)	E
Jimmy Arévalo (ECU)	W
Luis Sequera (VEN)	E
Franc Ocko (YUG)	W

Round of 16
Yoshiyuki Matsuoka (JPN)	W
Stephen Gawthorpe (GBR)	R
Bienvenu Mbida (CGO)	E
Constantin Niculae (ROU)	W
Brad Farrow (CAN)	E
Marc Alexandre (FRA)	W
Jimmy Arévalo (ECU)	E
Franc Ocko (YUG)	W

Quarterfinal
Yoshiyuki Matsuoka (JPN)	W
Constantin Niculae (ROU)	R
Marc Alexandre (FRA)	W
Franc Ocko (YUG)	E

Semifinal
Yoshiyuki Matsuoka (JPN)	W
Marc Alexandre (FRA)	R

=== Pool B ===
Round of 64
Sandro Rosati (ITA)	W
Andrés Sancho (CRC)	E

Round of 32
Sandro Rosati (ITA)	W
Francisco Rodríguez (ESP)	E
Carlos Soto (HON)	E
Alpaslan Ayan (TUR)	W
Edgar Claure (BOL)	E
Lucas Chanson (SUI)	W
Craig Agena (USA)	E
Alfredo Chinchilla (NOR)	W
James Rohleder (FRG)	W
Wang Shengli (CHN)	E
Sérgio Sano (BRA)	W
Fredy Torres (ESA)	E
Chong Siao Chin (HKG)	R
Hwang Jung-oh (KOR)	W
Mohamed Soubei (EGY)	E
Josef Reiter (AUT)	W

Round of 16
Sandro Rosati (ITA)	W
Alpaslan Ayan (TUR)	E
Lucas Chanson (SUI)	W
Alfredo Chinchilla (NOR)	E
James Rohleder (FRG)	E
Sérgio Sano (BRA)	W
Hwang Jung-oh (KOR)	W
Josef Reiter (AUT)	R

Quarterfinal
Sandro Rosati (ITA)	W
Lucas Chanson (SUI)	E
Sérgio Sano (BRA)	R
Hwang Jung-oh (KOR)	W

Semifinal
Sandro Rosati (ITA)	R
Hwang Jung-oh (KOR)	W

=== Repechages ===
Repechage
Jörgen Häggqvist (SWE)	E
Philip Laats (BEL)	W

Repechage quarterfinal
Philip Laats (BEL)	E
Stephen Gawthorpe (GBR)	W

Repechage semifinal
Stephen Gawthorpe (GBR)	W
Constantin Niculae (ROU)	E

Repechage final
Stephen Gawthorpe (GBR)	E
Marc Alexandre (FRA)	3rd place, bronze medalist(s)

Repechage		Repechage semifinal		Repechage final
Chong Siao Chin (HKG)	E
Josef Reiter (AUT)	W	Josef Reiter (AUT)	W
		Sérgio Sano (BRA)	E
				Josef Reiter (AUT)	3rd place, bronze medalist(s)
				Sandro Rosati (ITA)	E

=== Final ===
Final
Yoshiyuki Matsuoka (JPN)	1st place, gold medalist(s)
Hwang Jung-oh (KOR)	2nd place, silver medalist(s)

== Final classification ==
Rank	Judoka	Nation
1st place, gold medalist(s)	Yoshiyuki Matsuoka	Japan
2nd place, silver medalist(s)	Hwang Jung-oh	South Korea
3rd place, bronze medalist(s)	Marc Alexandre	France
3rd place, bronze medalist(s)	Josef Reiter	Austria
5T	Sandro Rosati	Italy
5T	Stephen Gawthorpe	Great Britain
7T	Sérgio Sano	Brazil
7T	Constantin Niculae	Romania
9T	Chong Siao Chin	Hong Kong
9T	Philip Laats	Belgium
11	Jörgen Häggqvist	Sweden
12T	Franc Ocko	Yugoslavia
12T	Lucas Chanson	Switzerland
14T	Bienvenu Mbida	Republic of the Congo
14T	Brad Farrow	Canada
14T	Jimmy Arévalo	Ecuador
14T	Alpaslan Ayan	Turkey
14T	Alfredo Chinchilla	Norway
14T	James Rohleder	West Germany
20T	Mohamed Soubei	Egypt
20T	Rui Rosa	Portugal
20T	Gerardo Padilla	Mexico
20T	Jesskiel Bikidick	Cameroon
20T	Max Narváez	Paraguay
20T	Jihad El-Achkar	Lebanon
20T	Luis Sequera	Venezuela
20T	Francisco Rodríguez	Spain
20T	Carlos Soto	Honduras
20T	Edgar Claure	Bolivia
20T	Craig Agena	United States
20T	Wang Shengli	China
20T	Fredy Torres	El Salvador
33T	Adel Al-Najadah	Kuwait
33T	Andrés Sancho	Costa Rica
