= 1984 Summer Olympics Parade of Nations =

During the parade of nations portion of the 1984 Summer Olympics opening ceremony, athletes from each country participating in the Olympics paraded in the arena, preceded by their flag. The flag was borne by a sportsperson from that country chosen either by the National Olympic Committee or by the athletes themselves to represent their country.

== Parade order ==
As the nation of the first modern Olympic Games, Greece entered the stadium first; whereas, the host nation of the United States marched last. Other countries entered in alphabetical order in the language of the host country (English), according to tradition and IOC guidelines.

Whilst most countries entered under their short names, a few entered under more formal or alternative names, mostly due to political and naming disputes. The Republic of China (commonly known as Taiwan) entered with the compromised name and flag of "Chinese Taipei" under T so that they did not enter together with conflicting People's Republic of China (commonly known as China), which entered as the "People's Republic of China" under C.

A record 140 nations entered the stadium with a combined total of 7,078 athletes. Eighteen nations made their Olympic debut, namely Bahrain, Bangladesh, Bhutan, British Virgin Islands, Djibouti, Equatorial Guinea, Gambia, Grenada, Mauritania, Mauritius, North Yemen, Oman, Qatar, Rwanda, Samoa, Solomon Islands, Tonga, and the United Arab Emirates. The People's Republic of China made its first appearance at the Summer Olympics since 1952, while the Republic of China participated for the first time under the name Chinese Taipei as a result of the IOC agreement. Thirteen countries, namely Afghanistan, Angola, Bulgaria, Cuba, Czechoslovakia, Ethiopia, East Germany, Hungary, Laos, Mongolia, North Korea, Poland, and Vietnam, were part of the Soviet Union-boycott of these Games. Apart from the People's Republic of China (a communist country that had substantially warmer relations with the United States than with the Soviet Union, following the Sino–Soviet split), Romania and Yugoslavia were among the socialist countries to disregard the boycott and attend the Games. Albania, Iran, Burkina Faso and Libya also did not compete at the Games, citing political reasons unrelated to the Soviet Union.

Notable flag bearers in the opening ceremony featured the following athletes: six-time Olympian and Star sailor Hubert Raudaschl (Austria); defending Olympic champions Stelios Mygiakis (Greece) in Greco-Roman wrestling, Esko Rechardt in Finn sailing, Angelo Parisi (France) in heavyweight judo, Sara Simeoni (Italy) in women's high jump, Corneliu Ion (Romania) in rapid fire pistol shooting, and Alejandro Abascal (Spain) in the Flying Dutchman; middle-distance runner and 1976 Olympic champion John Walker; dressage rider Christine Stückelberger (Switzerland); professional basketball player Dražen Dalipagić (Yugoslavia), who led his men's team to capture the gold medal in Moscow four years earlier; and hammer thrower Ed Burke (United States), who competed in his third appearance since the 1968 Summer Olympics in Mexico City.

== List ==
The following is a list of each country's announced flag bearer. The list is sorted by the order in which each nation appears in the parade of nations. The names are given in their official designations by the IOC.

Order	Country	Flag bearer	Sport
1	Greece	Stelios Mygiakis	Wrestling
2	Algeria	Abdelkrim Bendjemil	Handball
3	Andorra	Joan Tomàs Roca	Shooting
4	Antigua	Lester Benjamin	Athletics
5	Argentina	Ricardo Ibarra	Rowing
6	Australia	Wayne Roycroft	Equestrian
7	Austria	Hubert Raudaschl	Sailing
8	Bahamas	Bradley Cooper	Athletics
9	Bahrain	Youssef Mubarak	Official
10	Bangladesh	Saidur Rahman Dawn	Athletics
11	Barbados	Charles Pile	Cycling
12	Belgium	Edgar Henri Cuepper	Equestrian
13	Belize	Lindford Gillitt	Cycling
14	Benin	Firmin Abissi	Boxing
15	Bermuda	Clarence Saunders	Athletics
16	Bhutan	Thinley Dorji	Archery
17	Bolivia	Saúl Mendoza	Fencing
18	Botswana	Norman Mangoye	Official
19	Brazil	Eduardo de Souza	Sailing
20	British Virgin Islands	Lindel Hodge	Athletics
21	Burma	Latt Zaw	Boxing
22	Cameroon	Issa Hayatou	Official
23	Canada	Alex Baumann	Swimming
24	Cayman Islands	Carson Ebanks	Sailing
25	Central African Republic	André Marie Sayet	Boxing (coach)
26	Chad	Ousman Miangoto	Athletics
27	Chile	Carlos Rossi	Sailing
28	People's Republic of China	Wang Libin	Basketball
29	Colombia	Pablo Restrepo	Swimming
30	People's Republic of the Congo	Simone Nkabou	Chef de mission
31	Costa Rica	Elizabeth Jagush	Shooting
32	Cyprus	Marios Kassianidis	Athletics
33	Denmark	Michael Markussen	Cycling
34	Djibouti	Djama Robleh	Athletics
35	Dominican Republic	Pedro Nolasco	Boxing
36	Ecuador	Brigitte Morillo	Equestrian
37	Egypt	Mohamed Sayed Soliman	Basketball
38	El Salvador	Kriscia García	Athletics
39	Equatorial Guinea	Secundino Borabota	Athletics
40	Fiji	Viliame Takayawa	Judo
41	Finland	Esko Rechardt	Sailing
42	France	Angelo Parisi	Judo
43	Gabon	Odette Mistoul	Athletics
44	Gambia	Oumar Fye	Athletics
45	Federal Republic of Germany	Wilhelm Kuhweide	Sailing
46	Ghana	Makarios Djan	Athletics
47	Great Britain	Lucinda Green	Equestrian
48	Grenada	Bernard Wilson	Boxing
49	Guatemala	Oswaldo Méndez	Equestrian
50	Guinea	Abdoullaye Diallo	Judo
51	Guyana	Earl Haley	Athletics
52	Haiti	Ronald Agénor	Tennis
53	Honduras	Carlos Soto	Judo
54	Hong Kong	Solomon Lee	Shooting
55	Iceland	Einar Vilhjálmsson	Athletics
56	India	Zafar Iqbal	Field hockey
57	Indonesia	Lukman Niode	Swimming
58	Iraq	Ismail Salman	Boxing
59	Ireland	Gerry Mullins	Equestrian
60	Israel	Zehava Shmueli	Athletics
61	Italy	Sara Simeoni	Athletics
62	Ivory Coast	Avognan Nogboum	Athletics
63	Jamaica	Bertland Cameron	Athletics
64	Japan	Shigenobu Murofushi	Athletics
65	Jordan	Mourad Barakat	Chef de mission
66	Kenya	James Omondi	Boxing
67	Korea	Ha Hyung-joo	Judo
68	Kuwait	Tareq Al-Ghareeb	Judo
69	Lebanon	Toni Khouri	Chef de mission
70	Lesotho	Mochochonono Mokhutlole	Chef de mission
71	Liberia	Wallace Obey	Athletics
72	Liechtenstein	Manuela Marxer	Athletics
73	Luxembourg	Jeannette Goergen	Archery
74	Madagascar	Jean-Luc Bezoky	Boxing
75	Malawi	Fletcher Kapito	Boxing
76	Malaysia	Sabiahmad Abdullah Ahad	Shooting
77	Mali	Karamoke Kory Konte	Chef de mission
78	Malta	Peter Bonello	Sailing
79	Mauritania	Oumar Samba Sy	Wrestling
80	Mauritius	Vivian Coralie	Athletics
81	Mexico	Ivar Sisniega	Modern pentathlon
82	Monaco	Jean-Luc Adorno	Swimming
83	Morocco	Lahcen Samsam Akka	Athletics
84	Mozambique	Daniel Firmino	Official
85	Nepal	Khadga Ranabhat	Official
86	Netherlands	Ton Buunk	Water polo
87	Netherlands Antilles	Evert Johan Kroon	Swimming
88	New Zealand	John Walker	Athletics
89	Nicaragua	Gustavo Herrera	Official
90	Niger	Boubagar Soumana	Boxing
91	Nigeria	Yusuf Alli	Athletics
92	Norway	Alf Hansen	Rowing
93	Oman	Mohamed Al-Busaidi	Official
94	Pakistan	Manzoor Hussain	Field hockey
95	Panama	José Díaz	Weightlifting
96	Papua New Guinea	Iammogapi Launa	Athletics
97	Paraguay	Max Narváez	Judo
98	Peru	Edwin Vásquez	Shooting (official)
99	Philippines	Isidro del Prado	Athletics
100	Portugal	António Roquete	Judo
101	Puerto Rico	Fernando Cañales	Swimming
102	Qatar	Waheed Khamis Al-Salem	Athletics
103	Romania	Corneliu Ion	Shooting
104	Rwanda	Emmanuel Twagirayezu	Athletics (coach)
105	San Marino	Maurizio Zonzini	Gymnastics
106	Saudi Arabia	Safaq Al-Anzi	Shooting
107	Senegal	Amadou Ciré Baal	Shooting
108	Seychelles	Denis Rose	Athletics
109	Sierra Leone	David Sawyerr	Athletics
110	Singapore	Ang Peng Siong	Swimming
111	Solomon Islands	Tommy Bauro	Boxing
112	Somalia	Abdi Bile	Athletics
113	Spain	Alejandro Abascal	Sailing
114	Sri Lanka	Lalin Jirasinha	Sailing
115	Sudan	Abdul Al-Lalif	Official
116	Suriname	Siegfried Cruden	Athletics
117	Swaziland	Lenford Dlamine	Official
118	Sweden	Hans Svensson	Rowing
119	Switzerland	Christine Stückelberger	Equestrian
120	Syria	Joseph Atiyeh	Wrestling
121	Chinese Taipei	Lee Fu-an	Athletics
122	Tanzania	Michael Nassoro	Boxing
123	Thailand	Rangsit Yanothai	Shooting
124	Togo	Denou Koffi	Athletics
125	Tonga	Fine Sani	Boxing
126	Trinidad & Tobago	Hasely Crawford	Athletics
127	Tunisia	Fethi Baccouche	Athletics
128	Turkey	Mehmet Yurdadön	Athletics
129	Uganda	Ruth Kyalisima	Athletics
130	United Arab Emirates	Mubarak Ismail	Athletics
131	Uruguay	Carlos Peinado	Basketball
132	Venezuela	William Wuycke	Athletics
133	Virgin Islands	Jodie Lawaetz	Swimming
134	Western Samoa	Apelu Ioane	Boxing
135	Yemen Arab Republic	Ahmed Al-Ozari	Official
136	Yugoslavia	Dražen Dalipagić	Basketball
137	Zaire	Christine Bakombo	Athletics
138	Zambia	Dave Lishebo	Athletics
139	Zimbabwe	Zephaniah Ncube	Athletics
140	United States of America	Ed Burke	Athletics

== See also ==
- 1980 Summer Olympics national flag bearers
- 1988 Summer Olympics national flag bearers
