= Mi-sook =

- Hangul: 미숙
- RR: Misuk
- MR: Misuk

Mi-sook is a Korean given name. Mi-sook was the second-most popular name for newborn girls in South Korea in 1960.

People with this name include:

- Kim Mi-sook (born 1959), South Korean actress
- Lee Mi-sook (born 1961), South Korean actress
- Chung Misook (born 1962), South Korean voice actress
- Kim Mi-sook (handballer) (born 1962), South Korean handball player
- Ki Mi-sook (born 1967), South Korean handball player
- Kang Mi-suk (curler) (born 1968), South Korean wheelchair curler
- Kang Mi-suk (weightlifter) (born 1977), South Korean weightlifter

== See also ==
- List of Korean given names
