= Eun-sook =

- Hangul: 은숙
- RR: Eunsuk
- MR: Ŭnsuk
- IPA: [ɯnsuk̚]

Eun-sook, also spelled Eun-suk, Un-sook or Un-suk, is a Korean given name.

People with this name include:

- Sunwoo Eun-sook (born 1959), South Korean actress
- Unsuk Chin (born 1961), South Korean composer
- Choi Eun-suk (born 1963), South Korean cyclist
- Kim Eun-sook (basketball) (born 1963), South Korean former basketball player
- Jo Eun-sook (born 1970), South Korean actress
- Kim Eun-sook (born 1973), South Korean screenwriter
- Phyo Un-suk (born 1981), North Korean long-distance runner
- Choi Eun-sook (born 1986), South Korean épée fencer
- Yoo Eun-sook, South Korean voice actor

== See also ==
- List of Korean given names
