= Zehetner =

Zehetner is a surname. Notable people with the surname include:

- Brian Zehetner, American nutritionist
- Elisabeth Zehetner (born 1957), American athlete
- Johann Zehetner (1912–1942), Austrian field handball player
- Nora Zehetner (born 1981), American actress
