= Ocko (surname) =

Ocko or Očko is a surname. Notable people include:

- Antonín Janda-Očko (1892–1960), Czech footballer
- Jan Očko of Vlašim (died 1380), Czech archbishop
- Peter Ocko, American television producer
- Franc Očko (born 1960), Slovenian judoka
