= Kim Il =

Kim Il is the name of:

- Kim Il (fl. 10th century), personal name of Crown Prince Maui, Silla prince
- Kim Il (wrestler) (born 1971), North Korean amateur wrestler
- Kintarō Ōki, (1929–2006), South Korean professional wrestler
- Kim Il (pentathlete), South Korean pentathlete
- Kim Il (politician) (1910–1984), Premier of North Korea from 1972 to 1976

== See also ==
- Kim Il Sung, previous leader of North Korea
- Kim Jong Il, previous leader of North Korea
