= Yoshiyuki Matsuoka =

Japanese judoka (born 1957)

Personal information
- Born: 6 March 1957 (age 69)
- Occupation: Judoka

Sport
- Country: Japan
- Sport: Judo
- Weight class: ‍–‍65 kg

Achievements and titles
- Olympic Games: (gold) (1984)
- World Champ.: (silver) (1983)
Medal record
Men's judo
Representing Japan
Olympic Games
| Gold medal – first place | 1984 Los Angeles | ‍–‍65 kg |
World Championships
| Silver medal – second place | 1983 Moscow | ‍–‍65 kg |
| Bronze medal – third place | 1985 Seoul | ‍–‍65 kg |

Profile at external databases
- IJF: 40616, 10248
- JudoInside.com: 5424
- Updated on 19 June 2023

Yoshiyuki Matsuoka (松岡義之, Matsuoka Yoshiyuki; born on 6 March 1957, in Hyogo, Japan) is a retired judoka from Japan, who represented Japan at the 1984 Summer Olympics in Los Angeles, California. Matsuoka won the gold medal in the men's half-lightweight division (‍–‍65 kg), after having defeated South Korea's Hwang Jung-Oh in the final by Seoi Nage. He trained under 4 time world champion Shozo Fujii (1971–1979).

As of 2007, Matsuoka coaches the Komatsu Limited judo club. Among his students are world champions & olympic medalists Ayumi Tanimoto, Miku Tashiro, and Tsukasa Yoshida.
