= Cardis =

Cardis may refer to

- Cardis (name)
- Kärde, a village in Estonia
  - Treaty of Cardis, which ended a Russo–Swedish War in 1661
- Japanese thrush (Turdus cardis)
