= Claure =

Claure is a surname. Notable people with the surname include:

- Edgar Claure (born 1958), Bolivian judoka
- Marcelo Claure, Bolivian-American businessman
