= Lü Yue =

Lü Yue may refer to:

- Duke Cheng of Qi (died 795 BC), ruler of Qi
- Lü Yue (cinematographer) (born 1957), Chinese cinematographer and film director
- Lü Yu'e (born 1960), Chinese cyclist

== See also ==
- Lui Lok (1920–2010), Hong Kong police sergeant with the same Chinese name as the cinematographer
