= Sailing at the 1984 Summer Olympics – Flying Dutchman =

Sailing at the Olympics

Flying Dutchman at the Games of the XXIII Olympiad
- Flying Dutchman
- Venue: Long Beach
- Dates: 31 July to 8 August
- Competitors: 34 from 17 nations
- Teams: 17

Medalists
1st place, gold medalist(s)		Jonathan McKee; William Carl Buchan	United States
2nd place, silver medalist(s)		Terry McLaughlin; Evert Bastet	Canada
3rd place, bronze medalist(s)		Jonathan Richards; Peter Allam	Great Britain

The Flying Dutchman was a sailing event on the Sailing at the 1984 Summer Olympics program in Long Beach, Los Angeles County, California. Seven races were scheduled. 34 sailors, on 17 boats, from 17 nations competed.

== Results ==
Rank	Helmsman (Country)	Crew	Race I		Race II		Race III		Race IV		Race V		Race VI		Race VII		Total Points	Total -1
Rank	Helmsman (Country)	Crew	Rank	Points	Rank	Points	Rank	Points	Rank	Points	Rank	Points	Rank	Points	Rank	Points	Total Points	Total -1
1st place, gold medalist(s)	Jonathan McKee (USA)	William Carl Buchan	2	3.0	1	0.0	2	3.0	3	5.7	1	0.0	4	8.0	~~6~~	~~11.7~~	31.4	19.7
2nd place, silver medalist(s)	Terry McLaughlin (CAN)	Evert Bastet	3	5.7	2	3.0	1	0.0	1	0.0	~~8~~	~~14.0~~	1	0.0	8	14.0	36.7	22.7
3rd place, bronze medalist(s)	Jonathan Richards (GBR)	Peter Allam	~~11~~	~~17.0~~	3	5.7	5	10.0	4	8.0	4	8.0	8	14.0	2	3.0	65.7	48.7
4	Jørgen Bojsen-Møller (DEN)	Jacob Bojsen-Møller	1	0.0	6	11.7	~~8~~	~~14.0~~	8	14.0	7	13.0	3	5.7	4	8.0	66.4	52.4
5	Jörg Diesch (FRG)	Eckart Diesch	~~DSQ~~	~~24.0~~	12	18.0	4	8.0	2	3.0	10	16.0	6	11.7	1	0.0	80.7	56.7
6	Alan Adler (BRA)	Marcus Temke	5	10.0	~~PMS~~	~~24.0~~	13	19.0	6	11.7	2	3.0	2	3.0	9	15.0	85.7	61.7
7	Mario Celon (ITA)	Claudio Celon	10	16.0	8	14.0	~~15~~	~~21.0~~	9	15.0	5	10.0	12	18.0	3	5.7	99.7	78.7
8	Yoel Sela (ISR)	Eldad Amir	8	14.0	11	17.0	3	5.7	7	13.0	3	5.7	~~DSQ~~	~~24.0~~	DSQ	24.0	103.4	79.4
9	Bengt Hagander (SWE)	Magnus Kjell	9	15.0	7	13.0	11	17.0	5	10.0	9	15.0	11	17.0	13	19.0	106.0	87.0
10	David Mackay (NZL)	Luke Carter	7	13.0	15	21.0	10	16.0	~~16~~	~~22.0~~	12	18.0	7	13.0	5	10.0	113.0	91.0
11	Alejandro Abascal (ESP)	Miguel Noguer	6	11.7	9	15.0	14	20.0	11	17.0	~~16~~	~~22.0~~	9	15.0	7	13.0	113.7	91.7
12	Laurent Couraire-Delage (FRA)	Thierry Poirey	4	8.0	10	16.0	9	15.0	~~15~~	~~21.0~~	11	17.0	13	19.0	12	18.0	114.0	93.0
13	Rainer Fröhlich (SUI)	Bertrand Cardis	~~DSQ~~	~~24.0~~	13	19.0	7	13.0	10	16.0	13	19.0	5	10.0	14	20.0	121.0	97.0
14	Saburo Sato (JPN)	Tatsuya Wakinaga	14	20.0	5	10.0	6	11.7	12	18.0	14	20.0	14	20.0	~~15~~	~~21.0~~	120.7	99.7
15	Jamie Wilmot (AUS)	James Cook	12	18.0	~~14~~	~~20.0~~	12	18.0	14	20.0	6	11.7	10	16.0	10	16.0	119.7	99.7
16	Gerhard Panuschka (AUT)	Manfred Panuschka	13	19.0	4	8.0	~~16~~	~~22.0~~	13	19.0	15	21.0	15	21.0	11	17.0	127.0	105.0
17	Guillermo Tapia (MEX)	Arnoldo Rábago	15	21.0	16	22.0	17	23.0	~~DNF~~	~~24.0~~	17	23.0	16	22.0	16	22.0	157.0	133.0

DNF = Did Not Finish, DNS= Did Not Start, DSQ = Disqualified, PMS = Premature Start, YMP = Yacht Materially Prejudiced
= Male, = Female

=== Daily standings ===
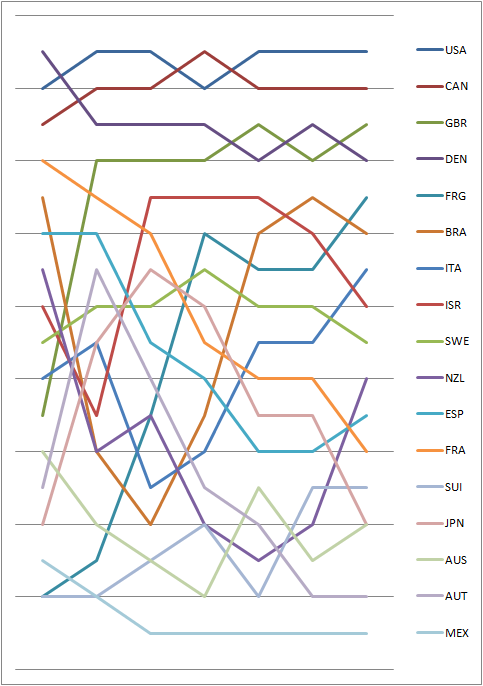
Graph showing the daily standings in the Flying Dutchman during the 1984 Summer Olympics

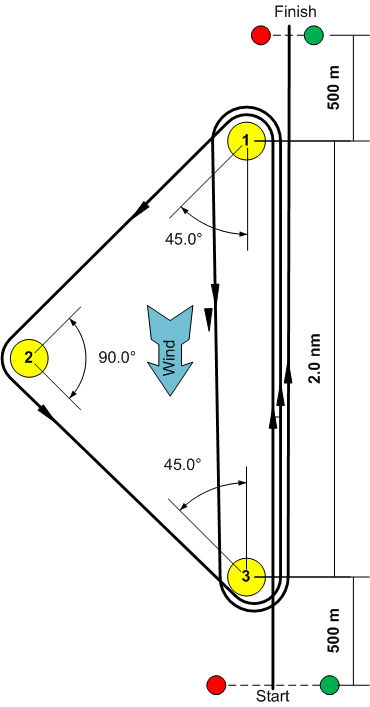
Flying Dutchman Course Map
