= Putzke =

Putzke is a surname. Notable people with the surname include:

- Holm Putzke (born 1973), German professor for criminal law at the University of Passau
- Vanadis Putzke (born 1961), German handball player
- Sebastian Putzke (born 1991), Canadian Construction Manager in Winnipeg Manitoba

== See also ==
- Putzke Peak, a peak in the McCuddin Mountains, Marie Byrd Land
