= Wakako =

- Gender: Female

Origin
- Origin: Japanese
- Meaning: It can have many different meanings depending on the kanji used.

Other names
- Related names: Waka

Wakako (わかこ, ワカコ) is a feminine Japanese given name.

== Written forms ==
Forms in kanji can include:

- わかこ (in hiragana)
- ワカコ (in katakana)
- 和佳子 "Japanese/peace, excellent, child"
- 和歌子 "traditional Japanese poetry, child"
- 若子 "young child"
- 和加子 "child who adds peace"

== People with the given name ==
- Wakako Abe (阿部 和香子; born 1966), Japanese former cyclist
- Wakako Hironaka (広中 和歌子; born 1934), Japanese writer and politician
- Wakako Matsumoto (松本 和香子; born 1960), know as Kujira, Japanese voice actress
- Wakako Sawara (佐原 若子; born 1953), Japanese politician and dentist
- Wakako Shimazaki (島崎 和歌子; born 1973), Japanese musician
- Wakako Tabata (田畑 和歌子; born 1983), Japanese sports sailor
- Wakako Taniguchi (谷口 和花子; born 1973), Japanese voice actress
- Wakako Tsuchida (土田 和歌子; born 1974), Japanese paraplegic athlete
- Wakako Yamauchi (山内 若子; 1924–2018), Japanese American playwright and short story writer
