= Mary Schweitzer =

Mary Schweitzer may refer to:

- Mary Anne Schweitzer (born 1961), American sports shooter
- Mary Higby Schweitzer, American paleontologist
