= Sandra Schumacher =

German cyclist (born 1966)

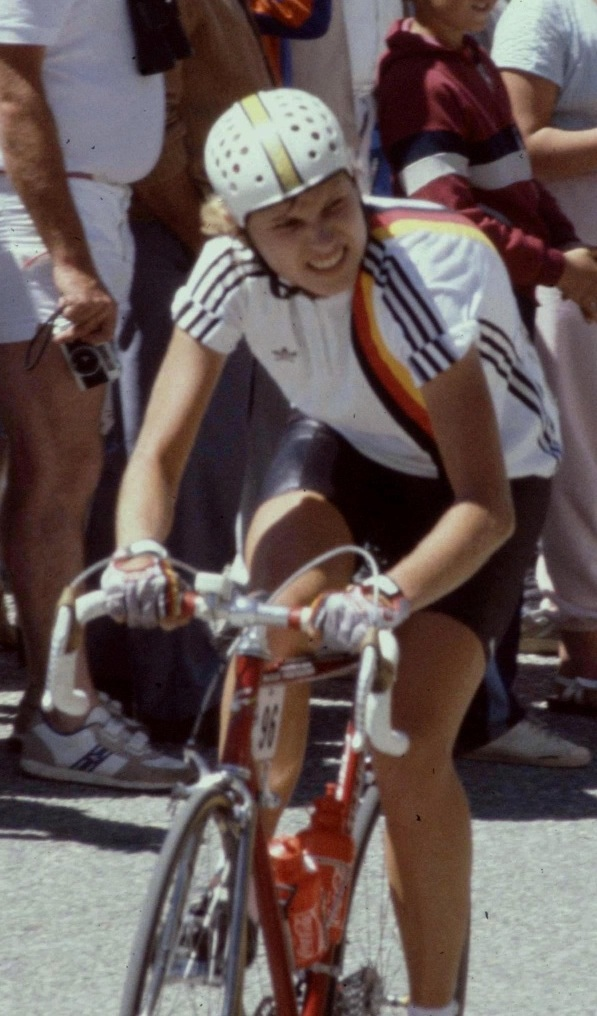
- Schumacher in 1986

Personal information
- Full name: Sandra Schumacher
- Born: 25 December 1966 (age 59) Cologne, West Germany

Cycling career
- Sport: Cycling
- Discipline: Road
- Role: Rider
Medal record
Women's road cycling
Representing West Germany
Olympic Games
Bronze medal – third place	1984 Los Angeles	Individual Road Race
UCI Road World Championships
Bronze medal – third place	1985 Italy	Road race

Sandra Schumacher (born 25 December 1966) is a retired track cyclist and road bicycle racer, who represented West Germany at the 1984 Summer Olympics. There she won the bronze medal in the women's road race, finishing behind USA riders Connie Carpenter-Phinney (gold) and Rebecca Twigg (silver).
