= Jesskiel Bikidick =

Cameroonian judoka (born 1954)

Personal information
- Nationality: Cameroonian
- Born: 20 March 1954 (age 71)

Sport
- Sport: Judo

Jesskiel Bikidick (born 20 March 1954) is a Cameroonian judoka. He competed in the men's half-lightweight event at the 1984 Summer Olympics.
