= Jihad El-Achkar =

Lebanese judoka

Personal information
- Nationality: Lebanese
- Born: 13 January 1962 (age 63)

Sport
- Sport: Judo

Jihad El-Achkar (born 13 January 1962) is a Lebanese judoka. He competed in the men's half-lightweight event at the 1984 Summer Olympics.
