= Gabriele Altweck =

German cyclist

Personal information
- Born: 11 January 1963 (age 63) Munich, West Germany

Cycling career
- Sport: Cycling

Gabriele Altweck (born 11 January 1963) is a German former cyclist. She competed in the women's road race event at the 1984 Summer Olympics.
