= Elena Macovei =

Romanian sports shooter

Personal information
- Nationality: Romanian
- Born: 16 April 1963 (age 63)

Sport
- Sport: Sports shooting

Elena Macovei (born 12 March 1963) is a Romanian sports shooter. She competed in the women's 25 metre pistol event at the 1984 Summer Olympics.
