= Hege Stendahl =

Norwegian cyclist

Personal information
- Born: 27 April 1967 (age 59) Trondheim, Norway

Cycling career
- Sport: Cycling

Hege Stendahl (born 27 April 1967) is a Norwegian cyclist. She was born in Trondheim. She competed at the 1984 Summer Olympics in Los Angeles, where she placed 19th in the individual road race.
