= Françoise Decharne =

French sports shooter

Personal information
- Nationality: French
- Born: 20 May 1963 (age 61)

Sport
- Sport: Sports shooting

Françoise Decharne (born 20 May 1963) is a French sports shooter. She competed in the women's 10 metre air rifle event at the 1984 Summer Olympics.
