= Isabel Chitas =

Portuguese sports shooter (born 1949)

Personal information
- Nationality: Portuguese
- Born: 2 June 1949 (age 77)

Sport
- Sport: Sports shooting

Isabel Chitas (born 2 June 1949) is a Portuguese sports shooter. She competed in the women's 25 metre pistol event at the 1984 Summer Olympics.
