= Rainer Fröhlich =

Swiss sailor

Personal information
- Nationality: Swiss
- Born: 30 July 1957 (age 67)

Sport
- Sport: Sailing

Rainer Fröhlich (born 30 July 1957) is a Swiss sailor. He competed in the Flying Dutchman event at the 1984 Summer Olympics.
