= Thérès Manser =

Swiss sports shooter

Personal information
- Nationality: Swiss
- Born: 13 June 1956 (age 70)

Sport
- Sport: Sports shooting

Thérès Manser (born 13 June 1956) is a Swiss sports shooter. She competed in the women's 25 metre pistol event at the 1984 Summer Olympics.
