= Sandro Rosati =

Italian judoka

Personal information
- Nationality: Italian
- Born: 7 March 1958 (age 67); Rome, Italy

Sport
- Sport: Judo

Sandro Rosati (born 7 March 1958) is an Italian judoka. He competed in the men's half-lightweight event at the 1984 Summer Olympics.
