= Muriel Sharp =

British cyclist

Personal information
- Born: 2 May 1953 (age 73) London, England

Cycling career
- Sport: Cycling

Muriel Sharp (born 2 May 1953) is a British former cyclist. She competed in the women's road race event at the 1984 Summer Olympics.
