= María Luisa Peña =

Spanish sports shooter

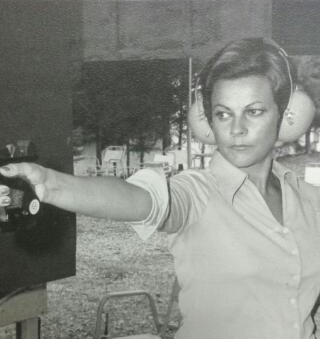
- María Luisa Peña, 1978

Personal information
- Nationality: Spanish
- Born: 16 April 1935 (age 91)

Sport
- Sport: Sports shooting

María Luisa Peña (16 April 1935 – 17 February 2026) was a Spanish sports shooter. She competed in the women's 25 metre pistol event at the 1984 Summer Olympics.
