= Jamie Wilmot =

Australian sailor

Personal information
- Nationality: Australian
- Born: 17 March 1953 (age 72); Sydney, Australia

Sport
- Sport: Sailing

Jamie Wilmot (born 17 March 1953) is an Australian sailor. He competed in the Flying Dutchman event at the 1984 Summer Olympics.

Wilmot was Australian champion in the Fireball dinghy class in 1972–1973 and finished second in the 1974 World Fireball Championships.
