= Peter Allam =

British sailor (born 1959)

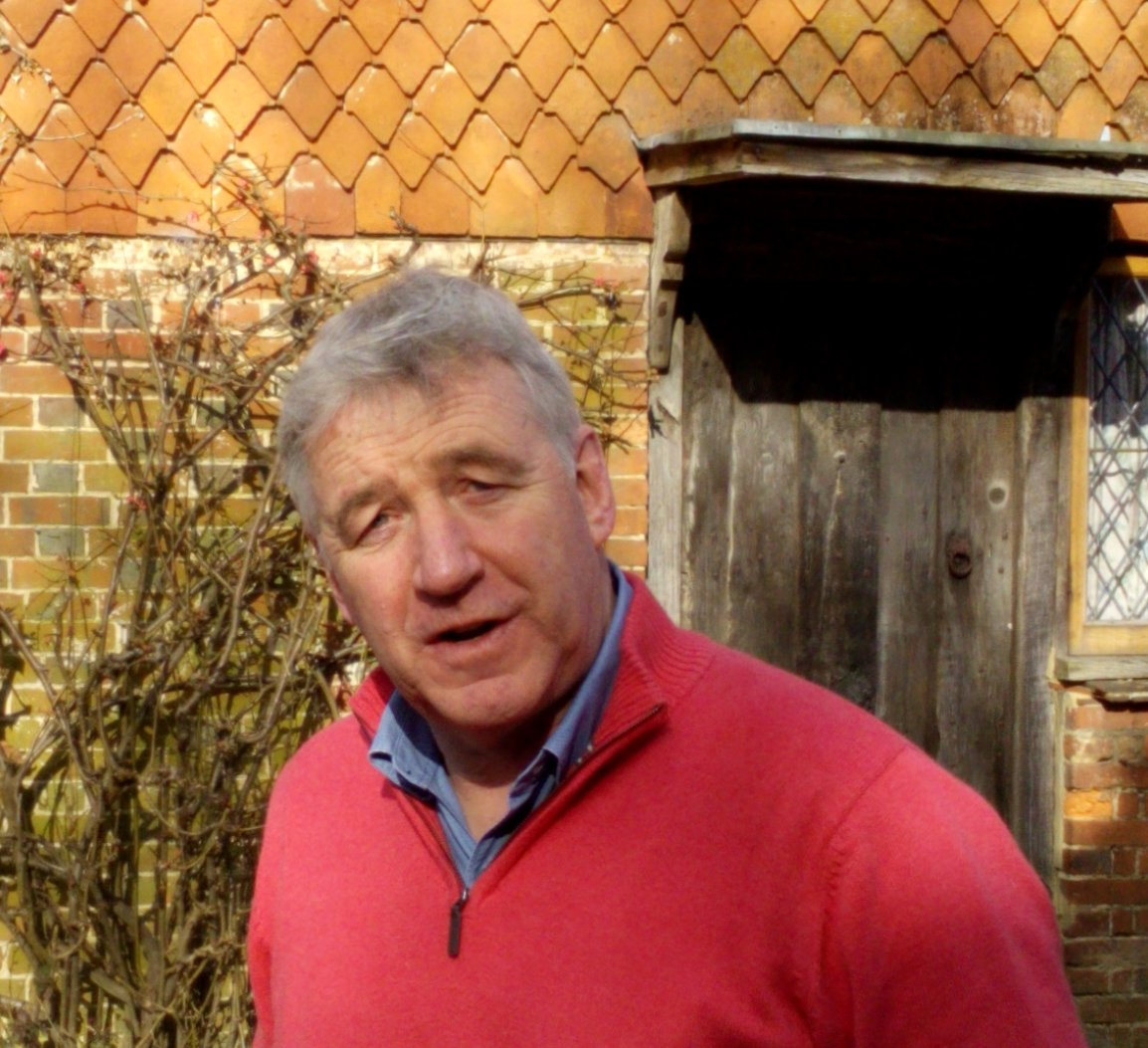
- Allam in 2015

Personal information
- Full name: Peter Frank Allam
- Nationality: British
- Born: 25 July 1959 (age 66) Christchurch, Dorset

Sailing career
- Sport: Sailing
- Club: Parkstone Yacht Club, Poole
- Class: Flying Dutchman
Medal record
Sailing
Representing Great Britain
Olympic Games
Bronze medal – third place	1984 Los Angeles	Flying Dutchman
- Updated on 27 February 2015

Peter Frank Allam (born 25 July 1959) is a British competitive sailor and Olympic medalist. He won a bronze medal in the Flying Dutchman class at the 1984 Summer Olympics in Los Angeles, together with Jonathan Richards.

Peter Allam is chief executive of the Weymouth and Portland National Sailing Academy.
