= Herta Reiter =

Austrian judoka

Personal information
- Born: 28 April 1957 (age 69)
- Occupation: Judoka

Sport
- Country: Austria
- Sport: Judo
- Weight class: –‍61 kg
- Club: UJZ Mühlviertel

Achievements and titles
- European Champ.: (gold) (1982)
Medal record
Women's judo
Representing Austria
European Championships
Gold medal – first place	1982 Oslo	‍–‍61 kg
Bronze medal – third place	1983 Genoa	‍–‍61 kg

Profile at external databases
- IJF: 61766
- JudoInside.com: 5686

Herta Reiter (born April 28, 1957) is a former Austrian judoka. She was the European champion in 1982 and third at the European Championships in 1983.

== Judo career ==
Herta Reiter trained at the UJZ Mühlviertel. She won her first Austrian championship title in 1977 in the weight class -56 kg. From 1979 she fought in the light middleweight, the weight class -61 kg. From 1979 to 1982 and in 1984 she was champion in this weight class. In 1983 she was second behind Andrea Peinbauer.

In 1980, Herta Reiter finished fifth at the European Championships in Udine and the World Championships in New York City. At the 1982 European Championships in Oslo, she won the title with a final victory over the Dutchwoman Chantal Han. At the end of the year, she was eliminated in the round of 16 at the 1982 World Championships in Paris against the Swede Agneta Billby. At the 1983 European Championships in Genoa, Reiter lost in the semifinals to the German Gabriele Ritschel. With a victory over Chantal Han, the Austrian won a bronze medal.

After her active career, she worked as a coach.

== Personal life ==
Reiter's brother is Olympic bronze medalist Josef. Her nephew Georg won the World Cup tournament in Miami in 2012.
