= Shooting at the 1984 Summer Olympics – Women's 25 metre pistol =

Sports shooting at the Olympics

Women's 25 metre pistol at the Games of the XXIII Olympiad
- Venue: Los Angeles, United States
- Date: July 29, 1984
- Competitors: 30 from 21 nations

Medalists
1st place, gold medalist(s)		Linda Thom	Canada
2nd place, silver medalist(s)		Ruby Fox	United States
3rd place, bronze medalist(s)		Patricia Dench	Australia

The women's 25 metre pistol was a shooting sports event held as part of the Shooting at the 1984 Summer Olympics programme. It was the first time the event was held for women at the Olympics. The competition was held on July 29, 1984, at the shooting ranges in Los Angeles. 30 shooters from 21 nations competed.

== Results ==
Place	Shooter	Total	Shoot-off
1	Linda Thom (CAN)	585	198
2	Ruby Fox (USA)	585	197
3	Patricia Dench (AUS)	583	196
4	Liu Haiying (CHN)	583	195
5	Kristina Fries (SWE)	581	
6	Wen Zhifang (CHN)	578	
7	Débora Srour (BRA)	578	
8	Maria Macovei (ROU)	577	
9	Evelyne Manchon (FRA)	577	
10	Mun Yang-ja (KOR)	576	
11	Cris Kajd (SWE)	576	
12	Carol Bartlett-Page (GBR)	575	
13	Kim Dyer (USA)	574	
14	Kim Hye-yeong (KOR)	573	
15T	Isabel Chitas (POR)	572	
15T	Elena Macovei (ROU)	572	
15T	Lely Sampurno (INA)	572	
18	Loredana Zugna (ITA)	571	
19	Angsuman Chotisathein (THA)	569	
20	Waltraud Weißenberg (FRG)	568	
21T	Agi Kasoumi (GRE)	565	
21T	Elvira Salazar (COL)	565	
23T	Brida Beccarelli (SUI)	564	
23T	Keiko Hirakawa (JPN)	564	
23T	Thérès Manser (SUI)	564	
23T	Atsuko Sugimoto (JPN)	564	
27	Adrienne Bennett (GBR)	563	
28	Selvyana Adrian-Sofyan (INA)	559	
29	Mónica Patron (MEX)	557	
30	María Luisa Peña (ESP)	545	
