= Wang Shengli =

Chinese judoka

Personal information
- Full name: Chinese: 王 勝利; pinyin: Wáng Shèng-lì
- Nationality: Chinese
- Born: 2 June 1962 (age 62)

Sport
- Sport: Judo

Wang Shengli (born 2 June 1962) is a Chinese judoka. He competed in the men's half-lightweight event at the 1984 Summer Olympics.
