= Cycling at the 1984 Summer Olympics – Women's individual road race =

Summer

Women's road race at the Games of the XXIII Olympiad
- Venue: Streets of Mission Viejo
- Date: July 29
- Competitors: 45 from 16 nations
- Winning time: 2:11:14

Medalists
1st place, gold medalist(s)		Connie Carpenter; United States
2nd place, silver medalist(s)		Rebecca Twigg; United States
3rd place, bronze medalist(s)		Sandra Schumacher; West Germany

The women's individual road race at the 1984 Los Angeles Summer Olympics was the first time that a women's cycling event had been included in the Olympic program. The race took place on Sunday July 29, 1984 along the major roads within Mission Viejo, California. There were 45 participants in the race, from 16 nations, with one cyclist who did not finish.

== Final classification ==
RANK	Rider	Time
	Connie Carpenter (USA)	2:11:14
	Rebecca Twigg (USA)	–
	Sandra Schumacher (FRG)	–
4	Unni Larsen (NOR)	–
5	Maria Canins (ITA)	–
6	Jeannie Longo (FRA)	+1:21
7	Helle Sørensen (DEN)	+2:14
8	Ute Enzenauer (FRG)	–
9	Luisa Seghezzi (ITA)	–
10	Janelle Parks (USA)	–
11	Cécile Odin (FRA)	–
12	Ines Varenkamp (FRG)	–
13	Catherine Swinnerton (GBR)	–
14	Dominique Damiani (FRA)	–
15	Kristina Ranudd (SWE)	–
16	Tuulikki Jahre (SWE)	–
17	Linda Gornall (GBR)	–
18	Nina Søby (NOR)	–
19	Hege Stendahl (NOR)	–
20	Marielle Guichard (FRA)	–
21	Inga Thompson (USA)	–
22	Geneviève Robic-Brunet (CAN)	+2:48
23	Roberta Bonanomi (ITA)	+3:59
24	Marie-Claude Audet (CAN)	+9:02
25	Marianne Berglund (SWE)	–
26	Johanna Hack (AUT)	+9:28
27	Karen Strong-Hearth (CAN)	+10:49
28	Leontine van der Lienden (NED)	–
29	Maria Blower (GBR)	–
30	Muriel Sharp (GBR)	–
31	Lu Suyan (CHN)	+13:05
32	Kathlyn Ragg (FIJ)	+14:45
33	Gabriele Altweck (FRG)	+18:12
34	Emanuela Menuzzo (ITA)	–
35	Paula Westher (SWE)	–
36	Wang Li (CHN)	–
37	Hennie Top (NED)	–
38	Hilde Dobiasch (AUT)	–
39	Thea van Rijnsoever (NED)	–
40	Wakako Abe (JPN)	+28:58
41	Lu Yu'e (CHN)	+31:41
42	Choi Eun-suk (KOR)	+32:36
43	Mun Suk (KOR)	+32:57
44	Son Yak-seon (KOR)	+37:22
–	Merilyn Phillips (CAY)	DNF
