= Brida Beccarelli =

Swiss sports shooter

Personal information
- Nationality: Swiss
- Born: 20 January 1957 (age 69)

Sport
- Sport: Sports shooting

Brida Beccarelli (born 20 January 1957) is a Swiss sports shooter.

== Olympics career ==
She competed in the women's 25 metre pistol event at the 1984 Summer Olympics.
