= Marie-Claude Audet =

Canadian cyclist

Personal information
- Born: 20 January 1962 (age 64) La Sarre, Quebec, Canada

Cycling career
- Sport: Cycling

Marie-Claude Audet (born 20 January 1962) is a Canadian former cyclist. She competed in the women's road race event at the 1984 Summer Olympics.
