= Shooting at the 1984 Summer Olympics – Women's 10 metre air rifle =

Sports shooting at the Olympics

Women's 10 metre air rifle at the Games of the XXIII Olympiad
- Venue: Los Angeles, United States
- Date: July 31, 1984
- Competitors: 33 from 20 nations

Medalists
1st place, gold medalist(s)		Pat Spurgin	United States
2nd place, silver medalist(s)		Edith Gufler	Italy
3rd place, bronze medalist(s)		Wu Xiaoxuan	China

The women's 10 metre air rifle was a shooting sports event held as part of the Shooting at the 1984 Summer Olympics programme. It was the first time the event was held for women at the Olympics. The competition was held on July 31, 1984 at the shooting ranges in Los Angeles. 33 shooters from 20 nations competed.

== Results ==
Place	Shooter	Total
1	Pat Spurgin (USA)	393
2	Edith Gufler (ITA)	391
3	Wu Xiaoxuan (CHN)	389
4	Sharon Bowes (CAN)	388
5	Yvette Courault (FRA)	386
6	Gisela Sailer (FRG)	385
7	Siri Landsem (NOR)	384
8	Sirpa Ylönen (FIN)	383
9	Liu Renqing (CHN)	383
10	Noriko Kosai (JPN)	383
11T	Françoise Decharne (FRA)	381
11T	Christina Gustafsson (SWE)	381
11T	Anne Grethe Jeppesen (NOR)	381
11T	Park Jeong-a (KOR)	381
11T	Gudrun Sinnhuber (AUT)	381
11T	Silvia Sperber (FRG)	381
17	Valentina Atanaskovski (YUG)	380
18	Karin Bauer (AUT)	379
18	Mary Anne Schweitzer (USA)	379
20	Irene Daw (GBR)	378
21	Lee Jeong-hwa (KOR)	377
22	Soma Dutta (IND)	376
23T	Margareta Gustafsson (SWE)	375
23T	Marie-Louise Hosdey (BEL)	375
25	Sarah Cooper (GBR)	374
26T	Alejandra Hoyos (COL)	373
26T	Sylvia Muehlberg (AUS)	373
28	Jackie Terry (CAN)	372
29	Mirjana Jovovic-Horvat (YUG)	371
30	Gloria López (COL)	370
31	Siriwan Bhudvanbhen (THA)	369
32	Elizabeth Bourland (CRC)	365
33	Kanokwan Krittakom (THA)	360
