= Valentina Atanaskovski =

Yugoslav sports shooter (born 1963)

Personal information
- Nationality: Yugoslav
- Born: 30 June 1963 (age 62)

Sport
- Sport: Sports shooting

Valentina Atanaskovski (born 30 June 1963) is a Yugoslav sports shooter. She competed in the women's 10 metre air rifle event at the 1984 Summer Olympics.
