= Kanokwan Krittakom =

Thai sports shooter

Personal information
- Nationality: Thai
- Born: 1 November 1962 (age 62)

Sport
- Sport: Sports shooting

Kanokwan Krittakom (born 1 November 1962) is a Thai sports shooter. She competed in the women's 10 metre air rifle event at the 1984 Summer Olympics.
