= Keiko Hirakawa =

Japanese sports shooter

Personal information
- Nationality: Japanese
- Born: 7 April 1955 (age 71)

Sport
- Sport: Sports shooting

Keiko Hirakawa (平川 啓子, Hirakawa Keiko; born 7 April 1955) is a Japanese sports shooter. She competed in the women's 25 metre pistol event at the 1984 Summer Olympics.
