= Adrienne Bennett =

British sports shooter

Personal information
- Born: 1 June 1949 (age 75); Liverpool, England

Sport
- Sport: Sports shooting

Adrienne Bennett (born 1 June 1949) is a British sports shooter. She competed in the women's 25 metre pistol event at the 1984 Summer Olympics.
