= Sérgio Sano =

Brazilian judoka

Personal information
- Born: 18 January 1963 (age 62); Tupi Paulista, Brazil

Sport
- Sport: Judo

Sérgio Sano (born 18 January 1963) is a Brazilian judoka. He competed in the men's half-lightweight event at the 1984 Summer Olympics.
