= Waltraud Weißenberg =

German sports shooter

Personal information
- Nationality: German
- Born: 30 December 1943 (age 81); Weinsberg, Germany

Sport
- Sport: Sports shooting

Waltraud Weißenberg (born 30 December 1943) is a German sports shooter. She competed in the women's 25 metre pistol event at the 1984 Summer Olympics.
