= Atsuko Sugimoto =

Japanese sports shooter

Personal information
- Nationality: Japanese
- Born: 2 January 1959 (age 67)

Sport
- Sport: Sports shooting

Atsuko Sugimoto (杉本 充子, Sugimoto Atsuko; born 2 January 1959) is a Japanese sports shooter. She competed in the women's 25 metre pistol event at the 1984 Summer Olympics.
