= Stephen Gawthorpe =

British judoka

Personal information
- Nationality: British
- Born: 4 July 1958 (age 66); Barnsley, England

Sport
- Sport: Judo

Stephen Gawthorpe (born 4 July 1958) is a British judoka. He competed in the men's half-lightweight event at the 1984 Summer Olympics. In 1981, he became champion of Great Britain, winning the featherweight category at the British Judo Championships.
