= James Rohleder =

German judoka

Personal information
- Nationality: German
- Born: 7 April 1955 (age 69); Bremerhaven, Germany

Sport
- Sport: Judo

James Rohleder (born 7 April 1955) is a German judoka. He competed in the men's half-lightweight event at the 1984 Summer Olympics.
