= Lucas Chanson =

Swiss judoka

Personal information
- Nationality: Swiss
- Born: 29 October 1962 (age 62)
- Occupation: Judoka

Sport
- Sport: Judo

Profile at external databases
- JudoInside.com: 6139

Lucas Chanson (born 29 October 1962) is a Swiss judoka. He competed in the men's half-lightweight event at the 1984 Summer Olympics.
