= Bienvenu Mbida =

Congolese judoka

Personal information
- Nationality: Swiss

Sport
- Sport: Judo

Bienvenu Mbida is a Congolese judoka. He competed in the men's half-lightweight event at the 1984 Summer Olympics.
