= Mohamed Soubei =

Egyptian judoka

Personal information
- Nationality: Egyptian
- Born: 15 May 1954
- Died: 8 October 2013 (aged 59); Algeria

Sport
- Sport: Judo

Mohamed Soubei (15 May 1954 – 8 October 2013) was an Egyptian judoka. He competed in the men's half-lightweight event at the 1984 Summer Olympics.
