= Josef Reiter (judoka) =

Austrian Olympic judoka

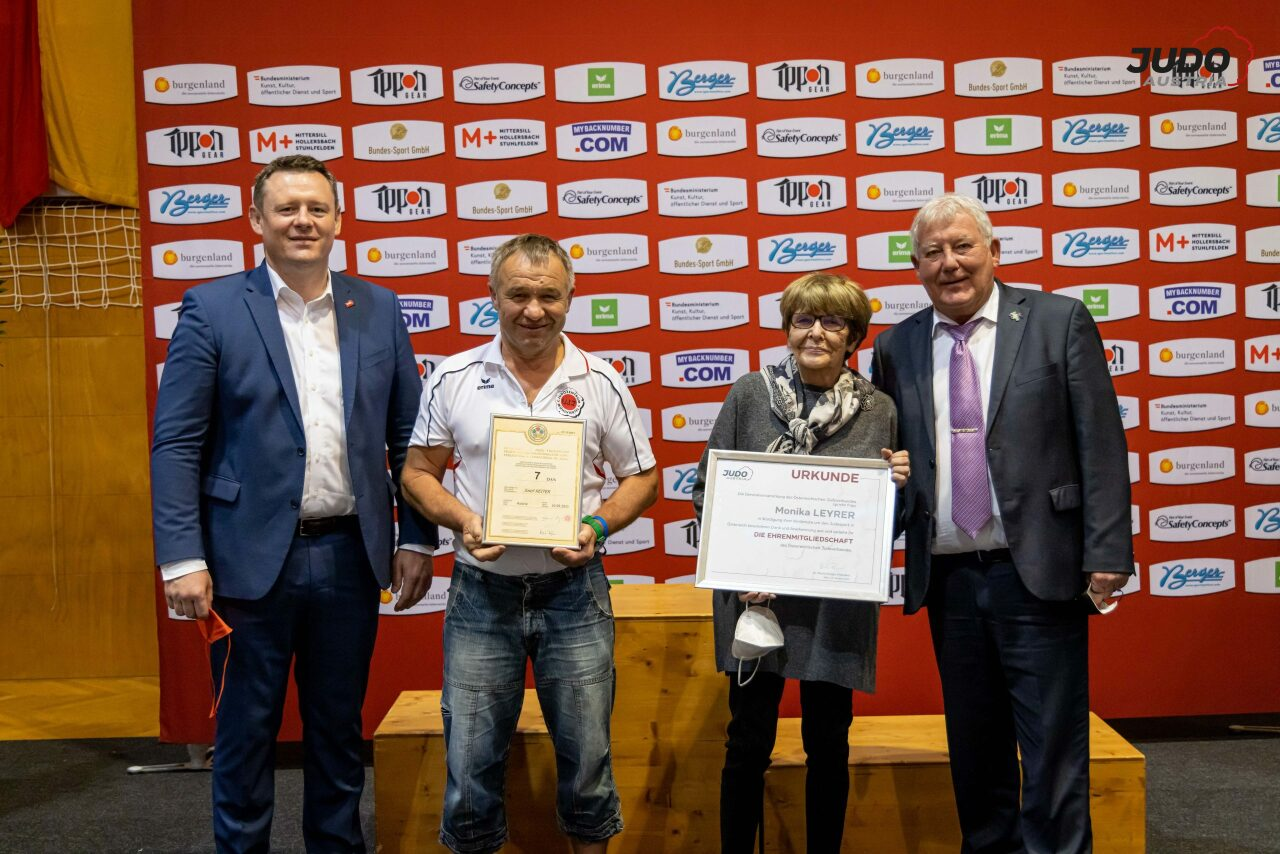
- ÖJV awards Josef Reiter the 7th Dan.

Personal information
- Nickname: Pepi
- Born: 8 January 1959 (age 67) Niederwaldkirchen, Upper Austria
- Occupation: Judo Coach

Sport
- Country: Austria
- Sport: Judo
- Weight class: –‍60 kg, –65 kg
- Rank: 7th dan black belt
- League: Erste Judo Bundesliga
- Club: UJZ Mühlviertel

Achievements and titles
- Olympic Games: (bronze) (1984)
- World Champ.: 5th (1983)
- European Champ.: (silver) (1980)
Medal record
Men's judo
Representing Austria
Olympic Games
Bronze medal – third place	1984 Los Angeles	‍–‍65 kg
European Championships
Silver medal – second place	1980 Vienna	‍–‍60 kg
Bronze medal – third place	1979 Brussels	‍–‍60 kg
Bronze medal – third place	1981 Debrecen	‍–‍65 kg
Bronze medal – third place	1982 Rostock	‍–‍65 kg

Profile at external databases
- IJF: 5443
- JudoInside.com: 5687
- Updated on 19 June 2023

Josef "Pepi" Reiter (born 8 January 1959) is a retired judoka from Austria, who represented his native country at three consecutive Summer Olympics. He is a seventh degree black belt.

== Judo career ==
Reiter was born in Niederwaldkirchen, Oberösterreich.

Reiter won a bronze medal in the men's lightweight division (‍–‍65 kg), alongside Marc Alexandre of France, at the 1984 Summer Olympics in Los Angeles, California.

== Personal life ==
His sister Herta won the 1982 European Championships. His son Georg was also a judoka. He won the PJC World Cup Miami in 2012.
