= Andrés Sancho =

Costa Rican judoka

Personal information
- Full name: Andrés Sancho Barrantes
- Born: 4 July 1961 (age 63); San José, Costa Rica
- Height: 167 cm (5 ft 6 in)
- Weight: 61 kg (134 lb)

Sport
- Country: Costa Rica
- Sport: Judo

Andrés Sancho Barrantes (Note: In this Spanish name, the first or paternal surname is Sancho and the second or maternal family name is Barrantes.) (born 4 July 1961) is a Costa Rican judoka. He competed in the men's half-lightweight event at the 1984 Summer Olympics.
