= Marielle Guichard =

French cyclist

Personal information
- Born: 29 December 1963 (age 62)

Cycling career
- Sport: Cycling

Marielle Guichard (born 29 December 1963) is a French former cyclist. She competed in the women's road race event at the 1984 Summer Olympics.
