= Kim Won-sik (runner) =

South Korean long-distance runner

Personal information
- Nationality: South Korean
- Born: 21 January 1963 (age 62)

Sport
- Sport: Long-distance running
- Event: Marathon

Kim Won-sik (born 21 January 1963) is a South Korean long-distance runner. He competed in the marathon at the 1984 Summer Olympics.

Kim attended Hanyang University and Korea National Sport University. He finished 3rd at the 1984 Dong-A Marathon, qualifying him to represent South Korea at the 1984 Summer Olympics. He finished 58th in the Olympic marathon.
