= Cardis (name) =

Cardis is both a surname and a given name. Notable people with the name include:

Surname

- Bertrand Cardis (born 1956), Swiss Olympic sailor
- Louis Cardis (1825–1877), American politician
- Romain Cardis (born 1992), French cyclist

Given name

- Cardis Cardell Willis (1937–2007), American comedian
