= Guillermo Tapia =

Mexican sailor (born 1942)

Personal information
- Nationality: Mexican
- Born: 16 June 1942 (age 83)

Sport
- Sport: Sailing

Guillermo Tapia (born 16 June 1942) is a Mexican sailor. He competed in the Flying Dutchman event at the 1984 Summer Olympics.
