= Elvira Salazar =

Colombian sports shooter

Personal information
- Nationality: Colombian
- Born: 16 July 1958 (age 68)

Sport
- Sport: Sports shooting

Elvira Salazar (born 16 July 1958) is a Colombian sports shooter. She competed in the women's 25 metre pistol event at the 1984 Summer Olympics.
