= Edith Gufler =

Italian sport shooter

Personal information
- Nationality: Italian
- Born: 6 August 1962 (age 63) Merano, Italy
- Height: 178 cm (5 ft 10 in)
- Weight: 65 kg (143 lb)

Sport
- Country: Italy
- Sport: Shooting
- Event: 10 metre air rifle
Medal record
Olympic Games
Silver medal – second place	1984 Los Angeles	10 metres air rifle

Edith Gufler (born 6 August 1962 in Merano) is a former Italian sport shooter who won a silver medal in 10 metre air rifle at the 1984 Summer Olympics.

== Biography ==
During her career, has a participation at Summer Olympics (1984) and was also Italian champion and two-time Italian record holder in the specialty.

== Olympic results ==
Year	Competition	Venue	Position	Event	Score
1984	Olympic Games	(United States) Los Angeles	2nd	10 metres air rifle	391

== See also ==
- Italy at the 1984 Summer Olympics
