= Gisela Sailer =

German sports shooter

Personal information
- Nationality: German
- Born: 8 May 1962 (age 62); Eppishausen, Germany

Sport
- Sport: Sports shooting

Gisela Sailer (born 8 May 1962) is a German sports shooter. She competed in the women's 10 metre air rifle event at the 1984 Summer Olympics.
