= Angsuman Jotikasthira =

Thai sports shooter (born 1949)

Personal information
- Nationality: Thai
- Born: 21 July 1949 (age 75)

Sport
- Sport: Sports shooting

Angsuman Jotikasthira (born 21 July 1949) is a Thai sports shooter. She competed in the women's 25 metre pistol event at the 1984 Summer Olympics.
