= Débora Srour =

Brazilian sports shooter

Personal information
- Born: 19 March 1962 (age 64) São Paulo, Brazil

Sport
- Sport: Sports shooting

Débora Srour (born 19 March 1962) is a Brazilian sports shooter. She competed in the women's 25 metre pistol event at the 1984 Summer Olympics.
