= Rui Rosa =

Portuguese judoka

Personal information
- Nationality: Portuguese
- Born: 31 May 1962 (age 62)

Sport
- Sport: Judo

Rui Rosa (born 31 May 1962) is a Portuguese judoka. He competed in the men's half-lightweight event at the 1984 Summer Olympics.
