= Loredana Zugna =

Italian sports shooter

Personal information
- Nationality: Italian
- Born: 1 May 1952 (age 74) Trieste, Italy

Sport
- Sport: Sports shooting

Loredana Zugna (born 1 May 1952) is an Italian sports shooter. She competed in the women's 25 metre pistol event at the 1984 Summer Olympics.
