= Jackie Terry =

Canadian sports shooter

Personal information
- Born: 29 May 1954 (age 71); Owen Sound, Ontario, Canada

Sport
- Sport: Sports shooting

Jackie Terry (born 29 May 1954) is a Canadian sports shooter. She competed in the women's 10 metre air rifle event at the 1984 Summer Olympics.
