= David Mackay (sailor) =

New Zealand sailor

Personal information
- Full name: David James Mackay
- Nationality: New Zealand
- Born: 25 March 1959 (age 67) Auckland, New Zealand

Sport
- Sport: Sailing

David James Mackay (born 25 March 1959) is a New Zealand sailor. He competed in the Flying Dutchman event at the 1984 Summer Olympics.
