= Maria Macovei =

Romanian sports shooter

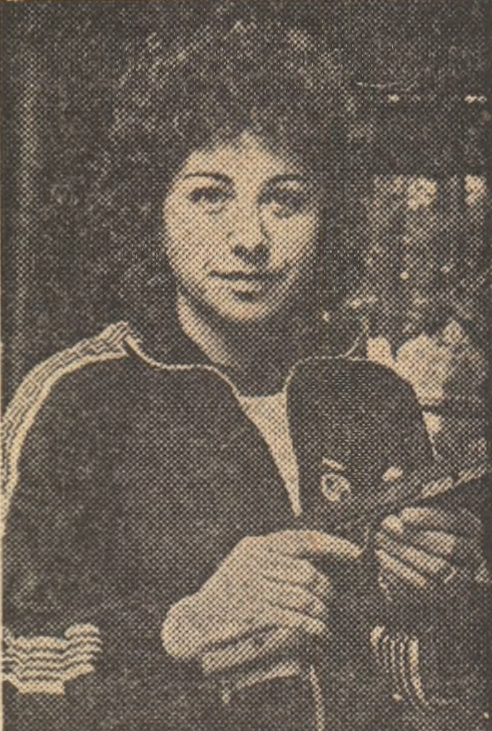
- Macovei in 1984

Personal information
- Nationality: Romanian
- Born: 7 January 1960 (age 66)

Sport
- Sport: Sports shooting

Maria Macovei (born 7 January 1960) is a Romanian sports shooter. She competed in the women's 25 metre pistol event at the 1984 Summer Olympics.
