= Carlos Soto (judoka) =

Honduran judoka

Personal information
- Full name: Carlos Soto Molina
- Nationality: Honduran

Sport
- Sport: Judo

Carlos Soto Molina is a Honduran judoka. With his service in sport, he was named a pioneer of judo in the sport by El Once. He competed for Honduras at the 1996 Summer Olympics in the men's half-lightweight event. Overall, he placed equal 20th alongside 12 other judokas.

== Biography ==
Carlos Soto Molina was born in Honduras. As an athlete, he competed in judo and represented Honduras in international competition. The news organization El Once named Soto, alongside fellow judokas Luis Armando Chirinos and Adrián Sierra, as pioneers of the sport in Honduras.

For the 1984 Summer Olympics held in Los Angeles, United States, Soto was selected to compete for the Honduran team. At the 1984 Summer Games, he was entered in one event, the men's half-lightweight event for competitors that weighed 65 kilograms (143 lb) or less. With this, he was the first judoka from Honduras to represent the nation at any edition of the Olympic Games. Chirinos and Sierra were also included in the delegation but did not start in either of their events. He was also named the flag bearer for the nation during the Summer Games' opening ceremony. The judo events at the Summer Games were held at the Eagle's Nest Arena. Soto competed in his event on 5 August 1984 and was assigned to compete in Pool B. For the first round, he received a bye and advanced to the second round. In the second round, he was set to compete against Alpaslan Ayan of Turkey during the second match. There, Soto was defeated by Ayan through ippon and was thus eliminated from competition. Overall, he placed equal 20th alongside 12 other judokas out of 34 competitors.
