= Luis Sequera =

Venezuelan judoka

Personal information
- Nationality: Venezuelan
- Born: 8 May 1961 (age 63)

Sport
- Sport: Judo

Luis Sequera (born 8 May 1961) is a Venezuelan judoka. He competed in the men's half-lightweight event at the 1984 Summer Olympics.
