= Francisco Rodríguez (Spanish judoka) =

Spanish judoka

Personal information
- Nationality: Spanish
- Born: 15 November 1957 (age 67)

Sport
- Sport: Judo

Francisco Rodríguez (born 15 November 1957) is a Spanish judoka. He competed in the men's half-lightweight event at the 1984 Summer Olympics.
