= Liu Renqing =

Chinese sports shooter

Personal information
- Nationality: Chinese
- Born: 4 February 1963 (age 62)

Sport
- Sport: Sports shooting

Liu Renqing (born 4 February 1963) is a Chinese sports shooter. She competed in the women's 10 metre air rifle event at the 1984 Summer Olympics.
