= Gloria López =

Colombian sports shooter

Personal information
- Nationality: Colombian
- Born: 19 November 1965 (age 59)

Sport
- Sport: Sports shooting

Gloria López (born 19 November 1965) is a Colombian sports shooter. She competed in the women's 10 metre air rifle event at the 1984 Summer Olympics.
