= Arnoldo Rábago =

Mexican sailor (born 1942)

Personal information
- Nationality: Mexican
- Born: 11 December 1942 (age 82)

Sport
- Sport: Sailing

Arnoldo Rábago (born 11 December 1942) is a Mexican sailor. He competed in the Flying Dutchman event at the 1984 Summer Olympics.
