= Roswitha Mroczynski =

German handball player (born 1963)

Personal information
- Nationality: German
- Born: 29 June 1963 (age 63) Berlin, Germany
- Height: 165 cm (65 in)

Sport
- Sport: Handball

Senior clubs
- Years: Team
- –: TSV GutsMuths Berlin
National team
- Years: Team
- –: West Germany

Roswitha Mroczynski (born 29 June 1963) is a German handball player who played for the West German national team. She was born in Berlin. She represented West Germany at the 1984 Summer Olympics in Los Angeles, where the West German team placed fourth.
