= Gerhard Panuschka =

Austrian sailor

Personal information
- Nationality: Austrian
- Born: 2 April 1959 (age 65)

Sport
- Sport: Sailing

Gerhard Panuschka (born 2 April 1959) is an Austrian sailor. He competed in the Flying Dutchman event at the 1984 Summer Olympics.
