= Reita Clanton =

American handball player

Personal information
- Full name: Reita Ethel Clanton
- Nationality: American
- Born: 30 July 1952 (age 74) Lafayette, Alabama, U.S.

Sport
- Sport: Handball
- Club: Auburn Tigers

Reita Ethel Clanton (born July 30, 1952) is an American former handball player who competed in the 1984 Summer Olympics. She was born in Lafayette, Alabama.
