= Wakako Abe =

Japanese cyclist (born 1966)

Personal information
- Born: 4 April 1966 (age 60) Aizuwakamatsu, Japan

Cycling career
- Sport: Cycling

Wakako Abe (阿部 和香子, Abe Wakako; born 4 April 1966) is a Japanese former cyclist. She competed in the women's road race event at the 1984 Summer Olympics and 1990 Asian Games.
