= Mun Yang-ja =

South Korean sports shooter

Personal information
- Nationality: South Korean
- Born: 20 April 1956 (age 70)

Sport
- Sport: Sports shooting

Mun Yang-ja (born 20 April 1956) is a South Korean sports shooter. She competed in the women's 25 metre pistol event at the 1984 Summer Olympics.
