= Kerstin Jönßon =

German handball player (born 1964)

Personal information
- Nationality: German / Austrian
- Born: 3 July 1964 (age 62) Glückstadt, West Germany

Sport
- Sport: Handball
National team
- Years: Team
- –: West Germany
- –: Austria

Kerstin Jönßon (born 3 July 1964) is a German handball player who played for the West German national team and later for Austria. She was born in Glückstadt. She represented West Germany at the 1984 Summer Olympics in Los Angeles, where the West German team placed fourth.

She represented Austria at the 1992 Summer Olympics in Barcelona.
