= Craig Agena =

American Olympic judoka (born 1960)

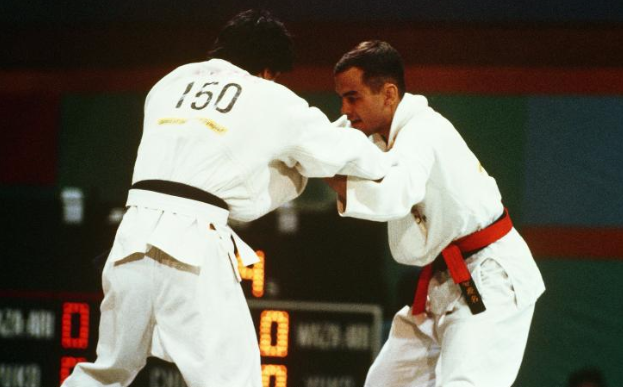
- Craig Agena, right, competes against Norway's Alfredo Chinchilla in the 65 kilogram weight class of the judo event at the 1984 Summer Olympics.

Personal information
- Born: 7 September 1960 (age 65)
- Occupation: Judoka

Sport
- Sport: Judo

Profile at external databases
- JudoInside.com: 22424

Craig John Agena (born 1960) is a former Olympic level judoka for the United States. He competed in the 1984 Summer Olympics.

== Career ==
Agena was born Craig John Agena, September 7, 1960, in Honolulu, Hawaii He attended Golden High School.

He trained at Northglenn Judo Center in Northglenn, Colorado, and competed in several events, including the 1981 and 1983 National Seniors judo competition (placed second and first respectively)

He graduated from the University of Colorado Colorado Springs in 1983.

After joining the army in 1983, he was placed in the U.S. Army World Class Athlete Program. Being placed second in the qualifying trials, Agena was given a place on the Olympic team of the 1984 Games competing (unplaced) in the 65 kilogram weight class of the Judo event.

Following the Games, he was transferred to a tank battalion in Germany, winning a bronze medal at the 1987 World Military Championships in San Diego, then later serving in Iraq and Japan.

Having risen to the rank of Colonel, he was chief of the Bilateral Coordination Action Team (BCAT) in 2011 at the time of the earthquake and tsunami, and directed US military efforts assisting the Japanese government in the clean up after the disaster.

He received the Japanese Order of the Rising Sun in 2014 for "Contribution to the strengthening of the Security of Japan and the Japan-US alliance and to the promotion of the understanding of Japanese culture".
