= Hwang Jung-oh =

South Korean judoka (born 1958)

Personal information
- Born: 1 April 1958 (age 68)
- Occupation: Judoka

Korean name
- Hangul: 황정오
- Hanja: 黄正五
- RR: Hwang Jeongo
- MR: Hwang Chŏngo

Sport
- Country: South Korea
- Sport: Judo
- Weight class: ‍–‍65 kg

Achievements and titles
- Olympic Games: (silver) (1984)
- World Champ.: (bronze) (1981)
- Asian Champ.: (bronze) (1981, 1984)
Medal record
Men's judo
Representing South Korea
Olympic Games
Silver medal – second place	1984 Los Angeles	‍–‍65 kg
World Championships
Bronze medal – third place	1981 Maastricht	‍–‍65 kg
Asian Championships
Bronze medal – third place	1981 Jakarta	‍–‍65 kg
Bronze medal – third place	1984 Kuwait City	‍–‍65 kg

Profile at external databases
- IJF: 54111
- JudoInside.com: 6079
- Updated on 19 June 2023

Hwang Jung-oh (born 1 April 1958) is a retired judoka from South Korea, who represented South Korea at the 1984 Summer Olympics in Los Angeles, California. There he won the silver medal in the men's half-lightweight division (‍–‍65 kg), after having been defeated by Seoi nage in the final match. He is also the founder of Hwang's Martial Arts.

Hwang has over 30 years of teaching experience in Taekwondo and the Martial Arts, still going to classes today. He holds a 6th degree Black Belt in Taekwondo, 6th degree Black Belt in Judo, and a 7th degree Black Belt in Hapkido. He won the Silver Medal in Judo in the 1984 Los Angeles Olympics.

Hwang has taught Taekwondo, Judo, and Hapkido at the University of Tennessee at Martin, Paducah Community College and each of the Hwang's Martial Arts Academies. He has participated in many conferences on Comparative Physical Education and Sports held around the world and has an international reputation as a Martial Arts Master and Educator. he teaches almost weekly at elementary school P.E. classes, teaches the tenets of martial arts and basic taekwondo Hwang has also made outstanding contributions to various organizations such as: WHAS Crusade for Children, Easter Seals Center in Paducah, KY and the MDA. In 1997, Mayor Jerry Abramson of Louisville, KY proclaimed June 27 as "Hwang's Martial Arts Day" in honor of Grandmaster Hwang's contributions to the Louisville community.

Grandmaster Hwang has focused his most recent efforts in improving the lives of those in his community and the commonwealth of Kentucky. The philosophy at Hwang's Martial Arts (HMA) is "The family that kicks together sticks together." By promoting families to participate in tae kwon do and judo together, Grandmaster Hwang has not only helped many people get into better physical condition, but also improve their lives through camaraderie and discipline. Furthermore, HMA has a strong sense of charity. Each year, HMA hosts many charitable events designed to raise money for the WHAS Crusade for Children and many other charitiessuch as Norton Children's hospital.
