= Jörgen Häggqvist =

Swedish judoka (born 1962)

Personal information
- Nationality: Swedish
- Born: 9 July 1962 (age 63) Gothenburg, Sweden

Sport
- Sport: Judo

Jörgen Häggqvist (born 9 July 1962) is a Swedish judoka. He competed at the 1984 Summer Olympics and the 1992 Summer Olympics.
