= Dieter Kotlowski =

Austrian fencer

Personal information
- Born: 18 July 1957 (age 68)

Sport
- Sport: Fencing

Dieter Kotlowski (born 18 July 1957) is an Austrian fencer. He competed in the team foil event at the 1984 Summer Olympics.
