= Jonathan Richards (sailor) =

British sailor

Jonathan Richards (born 31 March 1954) is a British competitive sailor and Olympic medalist. He won a bronze medal in the Flying Dutchman class at the 1984 Summer Olympics in Los Angeles, together with Peter Allam.
