= Max Narváez =

Paraguayan judoka (born 1957)

Personal information
- Full name: Max Tranquilino Narváez Matto
- Nationality: Paraguayan
- Born: 15 June 1957 (age 69)
- Height: 1.73 m (5 ft 8 in)
- Weight: 65 kg (143 lb)

Sport
- Sport: Judo

Max Tranquilino Narváez Matto (born 15 June 1957) is a Paraguayan former judoka. He competed in the men's half-lightweight event at the 1984 Summer Olympics.

== Biography ==
Narváez was born on 15 June 1957. He competed at the 1984 Summer Olympics and was the flag bearer for Paraguay during the Opening Ceremony. In the round of 16 of the group stage of the men's half-lightweight event, he faced Marc Alexandre, to whom he lost, being eliminated from the competition. Alexandre applied "kuzure kami shiho gatame", which resulted in an ippon. Narváez was classified in joint 20th place along with 12 other judokas.

By profession, he is a lawyer.
