= Lü Yu'e =

Chinese cyclist

Personal information
- Full name: 呂 玉娥, Pinyin: Lǚ Yù'é
- Born: 8 October 1960 (age 66)

Cycling career
- Sport: Cycling

Lü Yu'e (born 8 October 1960) is a Chinese former cyclist. She competed in the women's road race event at the 1984 Summer Olympics.
