= Penelope Stone =

American handball player

Personal information
- Nationality: American
- Born: August 11, 1962 (age 63) Houston, Texas, U.S.

Sport
- Sport: Handball

Penelope Stone (born August 11, 1962, in Houston) is an American former handball player who competed in the 1984 Summer Olympics and in the 1988 Summer Olympics.
