= Ulrike Huber =

Austrian handball player (born 1966)

Personal information
- Nationality: Austrian
- Born: 27 April 1966 (age 60)

Sport
- Sport: Handball
National team
- Years: Team
- –: Austria

Ulrike Huber (born 27 April 1966) is an Austrian handball player who played for the Austria women's national handball team. She represented Austria at the 1984 Summer Olympics in Los Angeles.
