= Sabrina Koschella =

German handball player (born 1963)

Personal information
- Nationality: German
- Born: 25 September 1963 (age 63) Stuttgart, West Germany
- Height: 172 cm (68 in)

Sport
- Sport: Handball
- Position: Goalkeeper

Senior clubs
- Years: Team
- –: VfL Sindelfingen
National team
- Years: Team
- –: West Germany

Sabrina Koschella (born 25 September 1963) is a German handball player who played for the West German national team. She was born in Stuttgart. She represented West Germany at the 1984 Summer Olympics in Los Angeles, where the West German team placed fourth. She played at club level for VfL Sindelfingen.
