= Michael Billwein =

Austrian modern pentathlete (born 1963)

Personal information
- Born: 15 December 1963 (age 62)

Sport
- Sport: Modern pentathlon

Michael Billwein (born 15 December 1963) is an Austrian modern pentathlete. He competed at the 1984 Summer Olympics.
