= Bang Jun-young =

South Korean swimmer (born 1965)

Personal information
- Born: 10 October 1965 (age 60)

Sport
- Sport: Swimming
- Strokes: Butterfly
Medal record
Representing South Korea
Asian Games
Silver medal – second place	1982 New Delhi	200m butterfly

- Bang Jun-young
- Hangul: 방준영
- Hanja: 方駿榮
- RR: Bang Junyeong
- MR: Pang Chunyŏng
- IPA: [pa̠ŋ.d͡ʑuɲjʌ̹ŋ]

Bang Jun-young (born 10 October 1965) is a South Korean butterfly swimmer. He competed in two events at the 1984 Summer Olympics. He attended Sungkyunkwan University.
