= Thomas Böhm (swimmer) =

Austrian swimmer

Personal information
- Born: 23 November 1965 (age 60)

Sport
- Sport: Swimming

Thomas Böhm (born 23 November 1965) is an Austrian swimmer. He competed at the 1984 Summer Olympics and the 1988 Summer Olympics.
