= Sabine Erbs =

German handball player (born 1964)

Personal information
- Full name: Sabine Fahrenwald
- Nationality: German
- Born: 17 July 1964 (age 62) Berlin, Germany
- Height: 167 cm (66 in)

Sport
- Sport: Handball

Senior clubs
- Years: Team
- –: TSV GutsMuths Berlin
National team
- Years: Team
- –: West Germany

Sabine Fahrenwald née Sabine Erbs (born 17 July 1964) is a German handball player and coach who played for the West German national team. She was born in Berlin. She represented West Germany at the 1984 Summer Olympics in Los Angeles, where the West German team placed fourth.

At club level she played for TSV GutsMuths Berlin.
