= Edgar Claure =

Bolivian judoka

Personal information
- Nationality: Bolivian
- Born: 8 August 1958 (age 66)

Sport
- Sport: Judo

Edgar Claure (born 8 August 1958) is a Bolivian judoka. He competed in the men's half-lightweight event at the 1984 Summer Olympics.
