= Karl Krenauer =

Austrian cyclist

Personal information
- Born: 9 March 1959 (age 67) Kittsee, Austria

Cycling career
- Sport: Cycling

Karl Krenauer (born 9 March 1959) is an Austrian former cyclist. He competed in the team time trial and the individual pursuit events at the 1984 Summer Olympics.
