= Manfred Panuschka =

Austrian sailor

Personal information
- Nationality: Austrian
- Born: 17 October 1960 (age 64)

Sport
- Sport: Sailing

Manfred Panuschka (born 17 October 1960) is an Austrian sailor. He competed in the Flying Dutchman event at the 1984 Summer Olympics.
