= Hilde Dobiasch =

Austrian cyclist

Personal information
- Born: 5 October 1954 (age 72)

Cycling career
- Sport: Cycling

Hilde Dobiasch (born 5 October 1954) is an Austrian former cyclist. She competed in the women's road race event at the 1984 Summer Olympics.
