= Brian Zehetner =

American nutritionist

Brian Zehetner is an American nutritionist for athletes and individuals, and has spent two years on the staff of the National Basketball Association's Milwaukee Bucks (as of 2006-07). Zehetner is a registered dietitian and Certified Strength and Conditioning Specialist by the National Strength and Conditioning Association. Before working with the Bucks, Zehetner was the staff nutritionist for the Canyon Ranch Spa in The Venetian Hotel, Las Vegas and instructed students in nutrition at University of Nevada/Las Vegas. Zehetner owns and runs the Sports nutrition consulting firm Fueling Performance.
