= Sherry Winn =

American handball player

Personal information
- Full name: Sherry Melissa Winn
- Nationality: American
- Born: September 1, 1961 (age 64) Pecos, Texas, U.S.

Sport
- Sport: Handball

Sherry Melissa Winn (born September 1, 1961, in Pecos, Texas) is an American former handball player who competed in the 1984 Summer Olympics and in the 1988 Summer Olympics.
