= Yoo Eun-sook =

South Korean voice actor

Yoo Eun Sook (Korean: 유은숙) is a South Korean voice actor.

She joined the Munhwa Broadcasting Corporation's voice acting division in 1994.

== Roles ==
=== Broadcast TV ===
- 24 (replacing Lourdes Benedicto by Season 2, Korea TV Edition, MBC)
- Galuxy Railroad 999 (Korea TV Edition, MBC)
- Chokomi (MBC)
- Bakuretsu Hunter (Korea TV Edition, MBC)

=== Film dubbing ===
- Sky Captain and the World of Tomorrow (replacing Angelina Jolie, Korea TV Edition, MBC)

== See also ==
- Munhwa Broadcasting Corporation
- MBC Voice Acting Division

== Home page ==
- Yoo Eun Sook Homepage (Siren) (in Korean)
- MBC Voice Acting Division Yoo Eun Sook Blog (in Korean)
