= Corinna Kunze =

German handball player (born 1963)

Personal information
- Nationality: German
- Born: 7 October 1963 Dortmund, West Germany
- Died: 11 June 2022 (aged 58)
- Height: 182 cm (72 in)

Sport
- Sport: Handball

Senior clubs
- Years: Team
- –: TuS Eintracht Minden
- –: Bayer Leverkusen
- –: HSV Solingen-Gräfrath
- –: HVE Villigst-Ergste
National team
Years	Team	Apps
–	West Germany	62

Corinna Kunze (7 October 1963 – 11 June 2022) was a German handball player who played for the West German national team. She was born in Dortmund. She represented West Germany at the 1984 Summer Olympics in Los Angeles, where the West German team placed fourth.
