= Johanna Hack =

Austrian cyclist

Personal information
- Born: 22 March 1957 (age 69)

Cycling career
- Sport: Cycling

Johanna Hack (born 22 March 1957) is an Austrian former cyclist. She competed in the women's road race event at the 1984 Summer Olympics.
