= Petra Platen =

German handball player (born 1959)

Personal information
- Nationality: German
- Born: 7 November 1959 (age 66) Moers, West Germany
- Height: 169 cm (67 in)

Sport
- Sport: Handball

Senior clubs
- Years: Team
- –: TuS Preußen Vluyn
- 1980-1985: Bayer 04 Leverkusen
- 1985-1989: VfL Engelskirchen
National team
Years	Team	Apps	(Gls)
–	West Germany	208	(355)

Petra Platen (born 7 November 1959) is a German Professor in sports medicine and former handball player.

== Handball Career ==
In the 80's she was an active handball player who presented Bayer 04 Leverkusen from 1980-1985 and VfL Engelskirchen from 1985-1989. She also played for and captained the West German national team. She represented West Germany at the 1984 Summer Olympics in Los Angeles, where the West German team placed fourth.

== Professorate ==
Platen studied biology and human medicin at the University of Cologne from 1978 to 1987, and became a doctor in 1987. From 1987 to 2005 she held various academic positions at the University of Cologne.

She has also been appointed at the Ruhr University Bochum, as head of the Department of Sports Medicine and Sports Nutrition.

== Selected publications ==
- With Katharina Trompeter, Daniela Fett: Prevalence of Back Pain in Sports: A Systematic Review of the Literature (2016). doi:10.1007/s40279-016-0645-3
- With Daniela Fett, Katharina Trompeter: Back pain in elite sports: A cross-sectional study on 1114 athletes (2017). doi:10.1371/journal.pone.0180130.
- With Katharina Trompeter, Daniela Fett: Back Pain in Rowers: A Cross-sectional Study on Prevalence, Pain Characteristics and Risk Factors (2019). doi:10.1055/a-0648-8387.
- With Bettina Schaar: Inline-Skating. Rowohlt, Reinbek bei Hamburg 2000, ISBN 3-499-19492-9.
- With Marion Lebenstedt, Gaby Bußmann: Ess-Störungen im Leistungssport: Ein Leitfaden für Athlet/innen, Trainer/innen, Eltern und Betreuer/innen. Sport und Buch Strauß, Köln 2004, ISBN 3-89001-135-7.
