= Cynthia Stinger =

American handball player

Personal information
- Nationality: American
- Born: July 9, 1958 (age 67) Trenton, New Jersey, U.S.

Sport
- Sport: Handball

Cynthia Stinger (born July 9, 1958, in Trenton, New Jersey) is an American former handball player who competed in the 1984 Summer Olympics, in the 1988 Summer Olympics, and in the 1992 Summer Olympics.
