= Gudrun Sinnhuber =

Austrian sports shooter

Personal information
- Nationality: Austrian
- Born: 12 March 1966 (age 59)

Sport
- Sport: Sports shooting

Gudrun Sinnhuber (born 12 March 1966) is an Austrian sports shooter. She competed in the women's 10 metre air rifle event at the 1984 Summer Olympics.
