= Niederwaldkirchen =

- Municipality
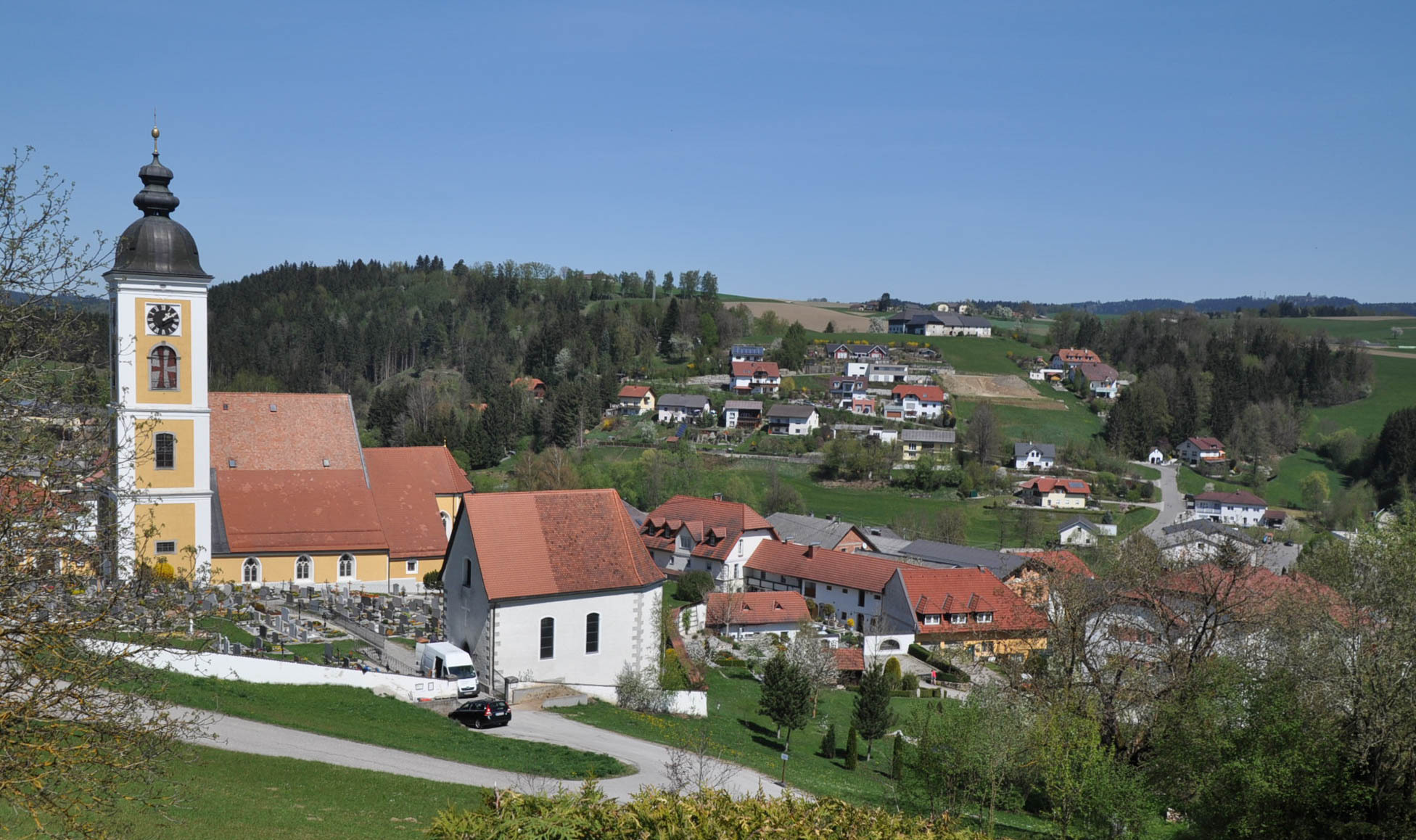

- Coat of arms

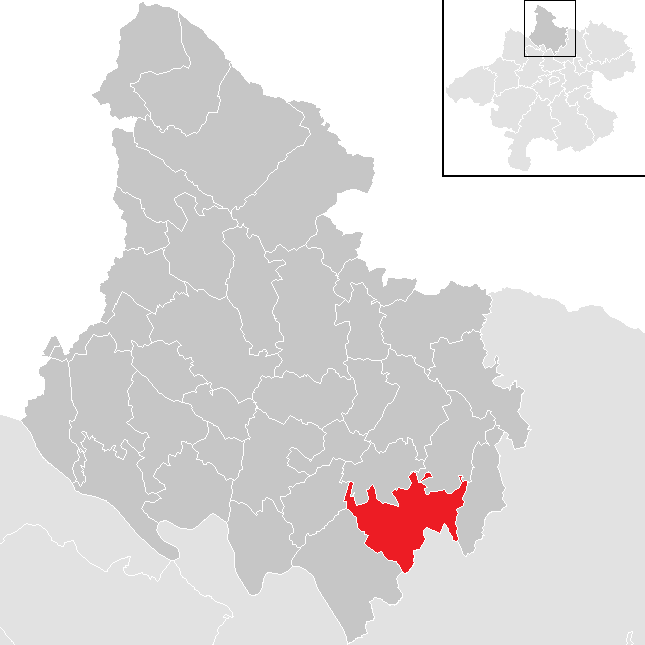
- Location in the district

- Location within Austria
- Coordinates: 48°27′05″N 14°05′08″E
- Country: Austria
- State: Upper Austria
- District: Rohrbach

Government
  - Mayor: Erich Sachsenhofer (ÖVP)

Area
  - Total: 28.21 km^{2} (10.89 sq mi)
- Elevation: 525 m (1,722 ft)

Population (2018-01-01)
  - Total: 1,816
  - Density: 64.37/km^{2} (166.7/sq mi)
- Time zone: UTC+1 (CET)
  - Summer (DST): UTC+2 (CEST)
- Postal code: 4174
- Area code: 07231
- Vehicle registration: RO
- Website: www.niederwaldkirchen.at

Niederwaldkirchen is a municipality in the district of Rohrbach in the Austrian state of Upper Austria.

== Population ==
Historical population
| Year | Pop. | ±% |
|---|---|---|
| 1869 | 1,659 | — |
| 1880 | 1,674 | +0.9% |
| 1890 | 1,657 | −1.0% |
| 1900 | 1,579 | −4.7% |
| 1910 | 1,549 | −1.9% |
| 1923 | 1,477 | −4.6% |
| 1934 | 1,566 | +6.0% |
| 1939 | 1,500 | −4.2% |
| 1951 | 1,481 | −1.3% |
| 1961 | 1,583 | +6.9% |
| 1971 | 1,578 | −0.3% |
| 1981 | 1,612 | +2.2% |
| 1991 | 1,754 | +8.8% |
| 2001 | 1,791 | +2.1% |
| 2011 | 1,758 | −1.8% |
| 2017 | 1,799 | +2.3% |
