= Sandra DeLaRiva =

American handball player

Sandra Repede
Personal information
- Full name: Sandra De la Riva Repede
- Nationality: American
- Born: 26 November 1961 (age 64) Los Angeles, California, U.S.

Sport
- Sport: Handball

Sandra De la Riva Repede (born November 26, 1961) is an American former handball player who competed in the 1984 Summer Olympics and in the 1988 Summer Olympics.
