= Horst Stocker =

Austrian modern pentathlete

Personal information
- Born: 22 August 1962 (age 63)

Sport
- Sport: Modern pentathlon

Horst Stocker (born 22 August 1962) is an Austrian modern pentathlete. He competed at the 1984 Summer Olympics, finishing last in 52nd place in the individual event.
