= Jeong Gyeong-hun =

South Korean modern pentathlete

Personal information
- Born: 27 April 1961 (age 65)

Sport
- Sport: Modern pentathlon

Jeong Gyeong-hun (born 27 April 1961) is a South Korean modern pentathlete. He competed at the 1984 Summer Olympics.
