= Norbert Petschel =

Austrian sailor

Personal information
- Nationality: Austrian
- Born: 25 April 1961 (age 63); Vienna, Austria

Sport
- Sport: Sailing

Norbert Petschel (born 25 April 1961) is an Austrian sailor. He competed at the 1984 Summer Olympics and the 1988 Summer Olympics.
