= Bertrand Cardis =

Swiss sailor

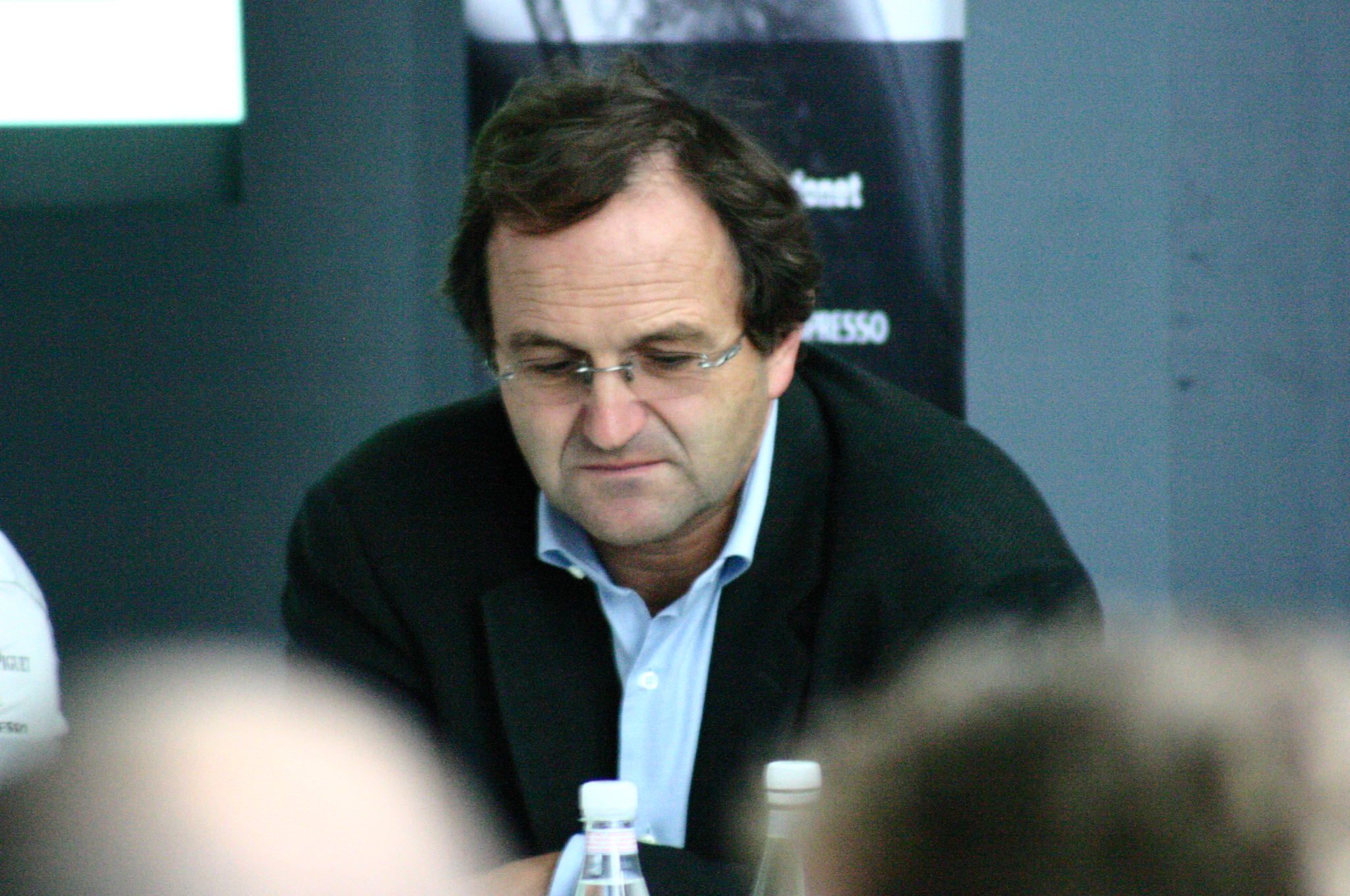
- Bertrand Cardis in 2006

Personal information
- Nationality: Swiss
- Born: 12 December 1956 (age 68)

Sport
- Sport: Sailing

Bertrand Cardis (born 12 December 1956) is a Swiss sailor. He competed in the Flying Dutchman event at the 1984 Summer Olympics.
