= Carol Lindsey =

American handball player

Personal information
- Full name: Carol Beth Lindsey
- Nationality: American
- Born: 26 March 1955 (age 70)

Sport
- Sport: Handball

Carol Beth Lindsey (born March 26, 1955), also known as "Coke" Lindsey, is an American former handball player who competed in the 1984 Summer Olympics.

In 1973, Lindsey graduated from Rockville Junior-Senior High School in Parke County, Indiana, where she played women's basketball and other sports.

Lindsey was recruited by the United States Team Handball Association while playing basketball at Purdue University. Lindsey successfully made the US Handball team for the 1980 Summer Olympics in Moscow, but the US boycotted the games. Four years later, Lindsey competed in the 1984 Summer Olympics in Los Angeles.
