= Constantin Niculae =

Romanian judoka

Personal information
- Nationality: Romanian
- Born: 1 April 1955 (age 69); Uliești, Romania
- Occupation: Judoka

Sport
- Sport: Judo

Profile at external databases
- JudoInside.com: 5726

Constantin Niculae (born 1 April 1955) is a Romanian judoka. He competed at the 1980 Summer Olympics and the 1984 Summer Olympics.
