= Alfredo Chinchilla =

Norwegian judoka

Personal information
- Full name: Alfredo José Chinchilla
- Nationality: Norwegian
- Born: 2 March 1962 (age 64) San José, Costa Rica
- Occupation: Judoka
- Height: 179 cm (5 ft 10 in)
- Weight: 65 kg (143 lb)

Sport
- Country: Norway
- Sport: Judo

Profile at external databases
- IJF: 17919
- JudoInside.com: 10734

Alfredo José Chinchilla (born 2 March 1962) is a Costa Rica born Norwegian judoka. He was born in San José, Costa Rica.

He competed at the 1984 Summer Olympics in Los Angeles.

Chinchilla won nine gold medals in Norwegian championships during his active career. He has later worked as coach.
