= Mary Anne Schweitzer =

American sports shooter

Personal information
- Nationality: American
- Born: March 15, 1961 (age 65) Lancaster, Pennsylvania, United States

Sport
- Sport: Sports shooting

Mary Anne Schweitzer (born March 15, 1961) is an American sports shooter. She competed in the women's 10 metre air rifle event at the 1984 Summer Olympics.
