= Ki Mi-sook =

South Korean handball player (born 1967)

Personal information
- Born: 26 December 1967 (age 58) Uijeongbu, Gyeonggi Province, South Korea
Medal record
Women's handball
Representing South Korea
Olympic Games
Gold medal – first place	1988 Seoul	Team

Korean name
- Hangul: 기미숙
- Hanja: 奇美淑
- RR: Gi Misuk
- MR: Ki Misuk

Ki Mi-sook (Korean: 기미숙; born 26 December 1967), also spelled as Ki Mi-suk, is a South Korean team handball player and Olympic champion. She played with the South Korean national team and received a gold medal at the 1988 Summer Olympics in Seoul.

== Notes ==
- Some English-language sources, such as Olympedia, Sports Reference erroneously state that Kim Mi-sook was winner of the 1984 Summer Olympics women's handball silver medallist.
