= Jimmy Arévalo =

Ecuadorian judoka (born 1960)

Personal information
- Nationality: Ecuadorian
- Born: 25 March 1960 (age 65)

Sport
- Sport: Judo

Jimmy Arévalo (born 25 March 1960) is an Ecuadorian judoka. He competed at the 1980 Summer Olympics and the 1984 Summer Olympics.
