= Gudrun Neunteufel =

Austrian handball player (born 1966)

Personal information
- Nationality: Austrian
- Born: 28 May 1966 (age 60)

Sport
- Sport: Handball
National team
- Years: Team
- –: Austria

Gudrun Neunteufel (born 28 May 1966) is an Austrian handball player who played for the Austrian national team. She represented Austria at the 1984 Summer Olympics in Los Angeles.
