= Ingo Peirits =

Austrian modern pentathlete

Personal information
- Born: 20 July 1963 (age 62)

Sport
- Sport: Modern pentathlon

Ingo Peirits (born 20 July 1963) is an Austrian modern pentathlete. He competed at the 1984 Summer Olympics, finishing in 51st place out of 52 competitors in the individual event.
