= Moon Kyung-ja =

South Korean basketball player

- Hangul: 문경자
- RR: Mun Gyeongja
- MR: Mun Kyŏngja

Moon Kyung-ja
Medal record

Women's basketball

Representing South Korea

Olympic Games
Silver medal – second place	1984 Los Angeles	Team competition

Asian Games
Silver medal – second place	1986 Seoul	Team competition

Moon Kyung-ja (born 14 August 1965) is a South Korean former basketball player who competed in the 1984 Summer Olympics. Her daughter Yang Ji-yeong, a graduate of Sookmyung Girls' High School, was drafted by the Women's Korean Basketball League Yongin Samsung Life Bichumi team in 2011.
