= Astrid Hühn =

German handball player (born 1960)

Personal information
- Nationality: German
- Born: 10 June 1960 (age 66) Hamburg, West Germany
- Height: 180 cm (71 in)

Sport
- Sport: Handball
- Position: Goalkeeker
National team
| Years | Team | Apps |
| – | West Germany | 187 |

Astrid Hühn (born 10 June 1960) is a German handball player who played for the West German national team. She was born in Hamburg. She represented West Germany at the 1984 Summer Olympics in Los Angeles, where the West German team placed fourth.
