= Chong Siao Chin =

Hong Kong judoka (born 1957)

Personal information
- Nationality: Hong Konger
- Born: 12 May 1957 (age 68)
- Occupation: Judoka

Sport
- Sport: Judo

Profile at external databases
- JudoInside.com: 14876

Chong Siao Chin (張小遷, Pinyin: Zhāng Xiǎo-qiān, Jyutping: Zoeng1 Siu2 Cin1; born 12 May 1957) is a Hong Kong judoka. He competed at the 1984 Summer Olympics and the 1988 Summer Olympics.
