= Lee Jeong-hwa =

South Korean sports shooter

Personal information
- Nationality: South Korean
- Born: 1 December 1957 (age 67)

Sport
- Sport: Sports shooting

Lee Jeong-hwa (born 1 December 1957) is a South Korean sports shooter. She competed in the women's 10 metre air rifle event at the 1984 Summer Olympics.
