= Mun Suk =

South Korean cyclist

Personal information
- Born: 10 May 1965 (age 61)

Cycling career
- Sport: Cycling

Mun Suk (Korean: 문숙; Hanja: 文淑; born 10 May 1965) is a South Korean former cyclist. She competed in the women's road race event at the 1984 Summer Olympics.
