= Gabriele Gebauer =

Austrian handball player (born 1958)

Personal information
- Nationality: Austrian
- Born: 10 April 1958 (age 68)

Sport
- Sport: Handball
National team
- Years: Team
- –: Austria

Gabriele Gebauer (born 10 April 1958) is an Austrian handball player who played for the Austrian national team. She represented Austria at the 1984 Summer Olympics in Los Angeles.
