= Yoon Byung-soon =

South Korean handball player (born 1963)

Personal information
- Born: 27 November 1963 (age 62)
- Height: 1.78 m (5 ft 10 in)

Sport
- Sport: Handball
National team
- Years: Team
- –: South Korea
Medal record
Women's handball
Representing South Korea
Olympic Games
Silver medal – second place	1984 Los Angeles	Team

Yoon Byung-Soon (Korean: 윤병순; born November 27, 1963), also spelled as Yun Byeong-Sun, is a former South Korean team handball player and Olympic medalist. She received a silver medal with the South Korean team at the 1984 Summer Olympics in Los Angeles.
