= Karin Hillinger =

Austrian handball player (born 1965)

Personal information
- Nationality: Austrian
- Born: 17 January 1965 (age 61)

Sport
- Sport: Handball
National team
- Years: Team
- –: Austria

Karin Hillinger (born 17 January 1965) is an Austrian handball player who played for the Austrian national team. She represented Austria at the 1984 Summer Olympics in Los Angeles.
