= Franc Očko =

Slovenian judoka

Personal information
- Nationality: Slovenian
- Born: 31 March 1960 (age 64); Slovenska Bistrica, Yugoslavia

Sport
- Sport: Judo

Franc Očko (born 31 March 1960) is a Slovenian judoka. He competed at the 1980 Summer Olympics and the 1984 Summer Olympics, representing Yugoslavia.
