= Vanadis Putzke =

German handball player (born 1961)

Personal information
- Nationality: German
- Born: 23 March 1961 (age 65) Dresden, East Germany
- Height: 167 cm (66 in)

Sport
- Sport: Handball

Senior clubs
- Years: Team
- –: TSV Milbertshofen
National team
- Years: Team
- –: West Germany

Teams managed
- 2006-2010: TSV Unterhaching
- 2020-: HT München youth team

Vanadis Putzke (born 23 March 1961) is a German handball player and coach who played for the West German national team. She was born in Dresden. She represented West Germany at the 1984 Summer Olympics in Los Angeles, where the West German team placed fourth. At club level she represented TSV Milbertshofen for 12 years.

From November 2006 until the end of the 2009-10 season she coached the women's team at TSV Unterhaching. In 2020 she became the youth coach at HT München.
