= Martina Neubauer =

Austrian handball player (born 1966)

Personal information
- Nationality: Austrian
- Born: 19 November 1966 (age 59)

Sport
- Sport: Handball
National team
- Years: Team
- –: Austria

Martina Neubauer (born 19 November 1966) is an Austrian handball player who played for the Austrian national team. She represented Austria at the 1984 Summer Olympics in Los Angeles.
