= Teresa Zielewicz =

Austrian handball player (1950-2011)

Personal information
- Nationality: Austrian
- Born: 25 February 1950 Szamotuły, Poland
- Died: 20 July 2011 (aged 61) Vienna, Austria

Sport
- Sport: Handball

Senior clubs
- Years: Team
- 1973-1978: Skra Warsaw
- –: AZS Warsaw
- 1980-1985: HypoBank Südstadt
National team
Years	Team	Apps	(Gls)
1970-1977	Poland	63	(170)
–	Austria		

Teresa Zielewicz (25 February 1950 in Szamotuły, Poland – 20 July 2011 in Vienna, Austria) was a Polish and later Austrian handball player.

She first represented her home country Poland, playing 63 matches and scoring 170 goals between February 26, 1970 (friendly match against Norway) and June 19, 1977 (friendly match against Hungary). She appeared at the world championships in 1973 (5th place) and 1975 (7th place).

In 1980, she went in Austria to play for HypoBank Südstadt. She then represented Austria at the 1983 B World Championship (8th place) and at the 1984 Summer Olympics in Los Angeles (6th place).
