= Alpaslan Ayan =

Turkish judoka

Personal information
- Nationality: Turkish
- Born: 4 May 1966 (age 58)
- Occupation: Judoka
- Height: 175 cm (5 ft 9 in)
- Weight: 71 kg (157 lb)

Sport
- Sport: Judo

Profile at external databases
- IJF: 53526

Alpaslan Ayan (born 4 May 1966) is a Turkish judoka. He competed at the 1984, 1988 and the 1992 Summer Olympics.
