= Kim Il (pentathlete) =

South Korean modern pentathlete

Personal information
- Born: 27 February 1962 (age 64)

Sport
- Sport: Modern pentathlon

Kim Il (born 27 February 1962) is a South Korean modern pentathlete. He competed at the 1984 Summer Olympics, finishing in 42nd place in the individual event.
