= Choi Eun-suk =

South Korean cyclist

Personal information
- Born: 22 October 1963 (age 62)

Cycling career
- Sport: Cycling

Choi Eun-suk (Korean: 최은숙; Hanja: 崔銀淑; born 22 October 1963) is a South Korean former cyclist. She competed in the women's road race event at the 1984 Summer Olympics.
