= Susanne Unger =

Austrian handball player (born 1965)

Personal information
- Nationality: Austrian
- Born: 19 September 1965 (age 61)

Sport
- Sport: Handball
National team
- Years: Team
- –: Austria

Susanne Unger (born 19 September 1965) is an Austrian handball player who played for the Austria women's national handball team. She represented Austria at the 1984 Summer Olympics in Los Angeles.

She is a sister of Monika Unger.
