= Monika Unger =

Austrian handball player (born 1955)

Personal information
- Nationality: Austrian
- Born: 17 April 1955 (age 71)

Sport
- Sport: Handball
National team
- Years: Team
- –: Austria

Monika Unger (born 17 April 1955) is an Austrian handball player who played for the Austria women's national handball team. She represented Austria at the 1984 Summer Olympics in Los Angeles.

She is a sister of Susanne Unger.
