= Silvia Steinbauer =

Austrian handball player (born 1964)

Personal information
- Nationality: Austrian
- Born: 17 February 1964 (age 62)

Sport
- Sport: Handball
National team
- Years: Team
- –: Austria

Silvia Steinbauer (born 17 February 1964) is an Austrian handball player who played for the Austrian national team. She represented Austria at the 1984 Summer Olympics in Los Angeles.
