= Elisabeth Zehetner =

Austrian handball player (born 1957)

Personal information
- Nationality: Austrian
- Born: 15 June 1957 (age 69)

Sport
- Sport: Handball
National team
- Years: Team
- –: Austria

Elisabeth Zehetner (born 15 June 1957) is an Austrian handball player who played for the Austrian national team. She represented Austria at the 1984 Summer Olympics in Los Angeles.
