= Kim Mi-sook (handballer) =

South Korean handball player (born 1962)

Personal information
- Born: June 10, 1962 (age 64)
Medal record
Women's handball
Representing South Korea
Olympic Games
Silver medal – second place	1984 Los Angeles	Team

Korean name
- Hangul: 김미숙
- Hanja: 金美淑
- RR: Gim Misuk
- MR: Kim Misuk

Kim Mi-sook (born June 10, 1962) is a South Korean team handball player and Olympic medalist. She won a silver medal with the Korean team at the 1984 Summer Olympics in Los Angeles. She won a gold medal at the 1988 Summer Olympics.

== Notes ==
- Some English-language sources, such as Olympedia, Sports Reference erroneously state that Ki Mi-sook was winner of the 1988 Summer Olympics women's handball gold medallist.
