= Egypt at the 1984 Summer Olympics =

- IOC code: EGY
- NOC: Egyptian Olympic Committee

in Los Angeles, United States 28 July–12 August 1984
- Competitors: 114 (108 men and 6 women) in 15 sports
- Flag bearer: Mohamed Sayed Soliman
- Medals Ranked 33rd: Gold 0 Silver 1 Bronze 0 Total 1

Summer Olympics appearances (overview)
- 1912; 1920; 1924; 1928; 1932; 1936; 1948; 1952; 1956; 1960–1964; 1968; 1972; 1976; 1980; 1984; 1988; 1992; 1996; 2000; 2004; 2008; 2012; 2016; 2020; 2024; 2028

Other related appearances
- 1906 Intercalated Games –––– United Arab Republic (1960, 1964)

Egypt competed at the 1984 Summer Olympics in Los Angeles, United States. The nation returned to the Summer Games after having joined the African boycott of the 1976 Summer Olympics in Montreal and the American-led boycott of the 1980 Summer Olympics in Moscow. 114 competitors, 108 men and 6 women, took part in 74 events in 15 sports.

== Medalists ==
Medal	Name	Sport	Event	Date
Silver	Mohamed Ali Rashwan	Judo	Men's open category	11 August

== Athletics ==
Men's 400 metres

- Nafee Mersal
  - Heat — 46.46 (→ did not advance)

Men's Shot Put

- Ahmed Kamel Shatta
  - Qualifying Round — 18.58 m (→ did not advance)
- Ahmed Mohamed Achouche
  - Qualifying Round — 18.11 m (→ did not advance)

== Basketball ==
Men's Team Competition

- Preliminary Round (Group A)
  - Lost to Italy (62-110)
  - Lost to Brazil (82-91)
  - Lost to Yugoslavia (69-100)
  - Lost to West-Germany (58-85)
  - Lost to Australia (78-94)
- Classification Matches
  - 9th/12th place: Lost to PR China (73-76)
  - 11th/12th place: Lost to France (78-102) → Twelfth and last place
- Team Roster
  - Khaled Bekhit
  - Mohamed Khaled
  - Alain Attalah
  - Mohamady Soliman
  - Abdelkader Rabieh
  - Amr Abdelmeguid
  - Abdelhadi El-Gazzar
  - Amin Shouman
  - Medhat Warda
  - Tarek El-Sabbagh
  - Ahmed Marei
  - Essameldin Abouelnein

== Boxing ==
Men's Bantamweight (54 kg)

- Gamaleldin El-Koumy
  1. First Round — Bye
  2. Second Round — Lost to Hiroaki Takami (Japan), 1-4

== Diving ==
Men's 3m Springboard

- Said Daw
  - Preliminary Round — 407.88 (→ did not advance, 26th place)
- Tamer Farid
  - Preliminary Round — 373.71 (→ did not advance, 28th place)

== Fencing ==
Six fencers, all men, represented Egypt in 1984.

Men's foil

- Abdel Monem El-Husseini
- Bilal Rifaat
- Ahmed Diab

Men's team foil

- Ahmed Diab, Abdel Monem El-Husseini, Bilal Rifaat, Khaled Soliman

Men's épée

- Ihab Aly
- Khaled Soliman
- Abdel Monem Salem

Men's team épée

- Ihab Aly, Ahmed Diab, Abdel Monem Salem, Khaled Soliman

== Football ==
Men's Team Competition

- Preliminary Round (Group D)
  - Egypt – Italy 0 – 1
  - Egypt – Costa Rica 4 – 1
  - Egypt – United States 1 – 1
- Quarterfinals
  - Egypt – France 0 – 2 (→ Did not advance)
- Team Roster:
  - ( 1.) Adel Elmaamour
  - ( 2.) Ali El Sayed Gadallah
  - ( 3.) Rabie Yassin
  - ( 4.) Mahmoud Saleh Hisham
  - ( 5.) Ibrahim Youssif
  - ( 6.) Yehia Sedky
  - ( 7.) Mostafa Ismail
  - ( 8.) Shawki Gharib
  - ( 9.) Magdi Abdelghani
  - (10.) Mahmoud El Khatib
  - (11.) Emad Soleman
  - (12.) Taher Abouzied
  - (13.) Badreldin Hamed
  - (14.) Mohamed Helmy
  - (15.) Omar Elzeer
  - (16.) Alaa Morsy
  - (17.) Salem Nagui Ahmed

== Judo ==
Athlete	Event	Round of 64	Round of 32	Round of 16	Quarterfinals	Semifinals	Final	Repechage 1	Repechage 2	Repechage 3	Placed
Athlete	Event	Opposition Result	Opposition Result	Opposition Result	Opposition Result	Opposition Result	Opposition Result	Opposition Result	Opposition Result	Opposition Result	Result
Mohamed Soubei	Men's 65 kg	---	Josef Reiter (AUT); L	did not advance							=20th
Yousry Zagloul	Men's 71 kg	---	Hassan Ben Gamra (TUN); L	did not advance							=19th
Walid Mohamed Hussain (Note: also known as Walid Abdulhalim; also competed in the 1988 Summer Olympics)	Men's 78 kg	Bye	Kuruvoli (FIJ); W	Wieneke (FRG); L	did not advance						=9th
Atif Muhammad Hussain	Men's 86 kg	Hamza Doublali (MAR); L	did not advance								=18th
Sherif El-Digwy	Men's +95 kg	Angelo Parisi (FRA); R	---						Cho Yong-chul (KOR); L	did not advance	=7th
Mohamed Ali Rashwan	Men's open category	---		Bechir Kiiari (TUN); W	Mihai Cioc (ROU); W	Xu Guoqing (ROU); W	Yasuhiro Yamashita (JPN); L	---			Silver

== Modern pentathlon ==
Three male pentathletes represented Egypt in 1984.

Individual

- Ihab El-Lebedy
- Samy Awad
- Ahmed Nasser

Test

- Ihab El-Lebedy
- Samy Awad
- Ahmed Nasser

== Swimming ==
Men's 100m Freestyle

- Mohamed Youssef
  - Heat — 53.19 (→ did not advance, 34th place)
- Ahmed Said
  - Heat — 55.01 (→ did not advance, 50th place)

Men's 200m Freestyle

- Mohamed Youssef
  - Heat — 1:59.71 (→ did not advance, 44th place)

Men's 100m Backstroke

- Sharif Nour
  - Heat — 59.63 (→ did not advance, 26th place)
- Emad El-Shafei
  - Heat — 1:02.04 (→ did not advance, 33rd place)

Men's 200m Backstroke

- Emad El-Shafei
  - Heat — 2:12.90 (→ did not advance, 29th place)

Men's 100m Breaststroke

- Ayman Nadim
  - Heat — 1:09.51 (→ did not advance, 43rd place)

Men's 200m Breaststroke

- Ayman Nadim
  - Heat — 2:33.17 (→ did not advance, 39th place)

Men's 100m Butterfly

- Ahmed Said
  - Heat — 57.71 (→ did not advance, 34th place)
- Ahmed Eid
  - Heat — 58.95 (→ did not advance, 40th place)

Men's 200m Butterfly

- Mohamed Youssef
  - Heat — 2:08.88 (→ did not advance, 30th place)
- Ahmed Said
  - Heat — DNS (→ did not advance, no ranking)

Men's 200m Individual Medley

- Emad El-Shafei
  - Heat — 2:14.87 (→ did not advance, 30th place)

Men's 4 × 100 m Freestyle Relay

- Mohamed Youssef, Sharif Nour, Ahmed Eid, and Ahmed Said
  - Heat — DSQ (→ did not advance, no ranking)

Men's 4 × 100 m Medley Relay

- Sharif Nour, Ayman Nadim, Ahmed Said, and Mohamed Youssef
  - Heat — 3:59.31 (→ did not advance, 15th place)

Women's 100m Freestyle

- Sherwite Hafez
  - Heat — 1:02.78 (→ did not advance, 40th place)
- Nevine Hafez
  - Heat — 1:04.06 (→ did not advance, 42nd place)

Women's 200m Freestyle

- Sherwite Hafez
  - Heat — 2:16.11 (→ did not advance, 33rd place)

Women's 200m Butterfly

- Nevine Hafez
  - Heat — DNS (→ did not advance, no ranking)

== Synchronized swimming ==
Women's Solo

- Dahlia Mokbel
  - Figures - 73.367 (44th place)
  - Final Standing - 155.767 (16th place)
- Sahar Helal
  - Figures - 70.049 (did not advance, 45th place)
- Sahar Youssef
  - Figures - 67.165 (did not advance, 48th place)

Women's Duet

- Dahlia Mokbel and Sahar Youssef
  - Figures - 67.165
  - Final Standing - Unknown Score (17th place)

== Volleyball ==
Men's team competition

- Preliminary Round (Group B)
  - Lost to Canada (0-3)
  - Lost to China (0-3)
  - Lost to Japan (0-3)
  - Lost to Italy (0-3)
- Classification match
  - 9th/10th place: Lost to Tunisia (2-3) → 10th place
- Team roster
  - Khaled Abdel Rahman
  - Mahmoud Abouelelaa
  - Ahmed Elaskalani
  - Esam Awad
  - Essam Ramadan
  - Gaber Abouzeid
  - Shaaban Khalifa
  - Hesham Radwan
  - Ahmed El-Shamouty
  - Abdelhamed El-Wassimy
  - Mohamed Abdel Hamed
  - Ehab Mohamed

== Wrestling ==
- Kamal Ibrahim, Men's Light-Heavyweight wrestler
