= Volleyball at the 1984 Summer Olympics – Men's team rosters =

Volleyball players at the Olympics

The following teams and players took part in the men's volleyball tournament at the 1984 Summer Olympics, in Los Angeles.

== Group A ==
=== Argentina ===
The following volleyball players represented Argentina:

- Alcides Cuminetti
- Alejandro Diz
- Carlos Wagenpfeil
- Daniel Castellani
- Esteban Martínez
- Hugo Conte
- Jon Emili Uriarte
- Leonardo Wiernes
- Raúl Quiroga
- Waldo Kantor
- Daniel Colla
- José De Palma

=== Brazil ===
The following volleyball players represented Brazil:

- Bernardinho
- Xandó
- Badalhoca
- Montanaro
- Rui
- Renan
- William (c)
- Amauri
- Marcus Vinícius
- Domingos Maracanã
- Bernard
- Fernandão

=== South Korea ===
The following volleyball players represented South Korea:

- Jang Yun-chang
- Jeong Ui-tak
- Gang Du-tae
- Gang Man-su
- Kim Ho-cheol
- Lee Beom-ju
- Lee Jong-kyung
- Lee Yong-seon
- Mun Yong-gwan
- No Jin-su
- Yang Jin-ung
- Yu Jung-tak

=== Tunisia ===
The following volleyball players represented Tunisia:

- Abdel Aziz Ben Abdallah
- Adel Khechini
- Chebbi Mbarek
- Faycal Laridhi
- Msaddak Lahmar
- Mohamed Sarsar
- Mounir Barek
- Rashid Bousarsar
- Razi Mhiri
- Slim Mehrizi
- Walid Boulahya
- Yassine Mezlini

=== United States ===
The following volleyball players represented the United States:

- Dusty Dvorak
- Dave Saunders
- Steve Salmons
- Paul Sunderland
- Rich Duwelius
- Steve Timmons
- Craig Buck
- Marc Waldie
- Chris Marlowe (c)
- Aldis Berzins
- Pat Powers
- Karch Kiraly

== Group B ==
=== Canada ===
The following volleyball players represented Canada:

- Alex Ketrzynski
- Allan Coulter
- Dave Jones
- Don Saxton
- Garth Pischke
- Glenn Hoag
- John Barrett
- Paul Gratton
- Randy Wagner
- Rick Bacon
- Terry Danyluk
- Tom Jones

Coach: Ken Maeda

=== China ===
The following volleyball players represented China:

- Cao Ping
- Liu Changcheng
- Shen Keqin
- Song Jinwei
- Xiao Qingsong
- Yang Liqun
- Yan Jianming
- Yu Juemin
- Ju Jixin
- Zhang Yousheng
- Zhao Feng
- Zuo Yue

=== Egypt ===
The following volleyball players represented Egypt:

- Mohamed Abdel Hamed
- Khaled Abdel Rahman
- Mahmoud Abou Elelaa
- Gaber Mooti Abou Zeid
- Essam Meawad
- Ahmed Abdel Aziz El-Askalani
- Ahmed El-Shamouty
- Shaban Khalifa
- Abdel Hamid El-Wassimy
- Ehab Mohamed
- Hisham Radwan
- Essam Ramadan

=== Italy ===
The following volleyball players represented Italy:

- Marco Negri
- Pier Paolo Lucchetta
- Giancarlo Dametto
- Franco Bertoli
- Francesco Dall'Olio
- Piero Rebaudengo
- Giovanni Errichiello
- Guido De Luigi
- Fabio Vullo
- Giovanni Lanfranco
- Paolo Vecchi
- Andrea Lucchetta

=== Japan ===
The following volleyball players represented Japan:

- Akihiro Iwashima
- Eizaburo Mitsuhashi
- Hiroaki Okuno
- Kazuya Mitake
- Kimio Sugimoto
- Koshi Sobu
- Minoru Iwata
- Shuji Yamada
- Shunichi Kawai
- Yasushi Furukawa
- Mikiyasu Tanaka
- Eiji Shimomura
