= Basketball at the 1984 Summer Olympics – Men's team rosters =

Olympic basketball rosters

Twelve men's teams competed in basketball at the 1984 Summer Olympics.

== Group A ==
=== Australia ===
The following players represented Australia:

- Andy Campbell
- Andrew Gaze
- Brad Dalton
- Damian Keogh
- Danny Morseu
- Ian Davies
- Larry Sengstock
- Mark Dalton
- Mel Dalgleish
- Phil Smyth
- Ray Borner
- Wayne Carroll
- James Kirkup (squad)

=== Brazil ===
The following players represented Brazil:

- Gerson
- Israel
- Marcel
- Marcelo
- Carioquinha
- Oscar Schmidt
- Sílvio
- Adilson
- Eduardo Agra
- Marquinhos
- Nilo Guimarães
- Cadum

=== Egypt ===
The following players represented Egypt:

- Abdel Hadi El-Gazzar
- Abdel Kader Rabieh
- Ahmed Mohamed Marei
- Alain Attalah
- Amin Shouman
- Amir Abdel Meguid
- Essameldin Abou El-Nein
- Khaled Mohammed Bekhit
- Mohsen Medhat Warda
- Mohamed Khaled
- Mohamed Sayed Soliman
- Tarek El-Sabbagh

=== Italy ===
The following players represented Italy:

- Antonello Riva
- Carlo Caglieris
- Dino Meneghin
- Enrico Gilardi
- Marco Bonamico
- Pierluigi Marzorati
- Renato Villalta
- Renzo Vecchiato
- Roberto Brunamonti
- Roberto Premier
- Romeo Sacchetti
- Walter Magnifico

=== West Germany ===
The following players represented West Germany:

- Armin Sowa
- Christian Welp
- Christoph Körner
- Detlef Schrempf
- Ingo Mendel
- Klaus Zander
- Michael Pappert
- Ulrich Peters
- Uwe Blab
- Uwe Brauer
- Uwe Sauer
- Vladimir Kadlec

=== Yugoslavia ===
The following players represented Yugoslavia:

- Dražen Petrović
- Aleksandar Petrović
- Nebojša Zorkić
- Rajko Žižić
- Ivan Sunara
- Emir Mutapčić
- Sabit Hadžić
- Andro Knego
- Ratko Radovanović
- Mihovil Nakić-Vojnović
- Dražen Dalipagić
- Branko Vukićević

== Group B ==
=== Canada ===
The following players represented Canada:

- Tony Simms
- Bill Wennington
- Danny Meagher
- Eli Pasquale
- Gerald Kazanowski
- Gord Herbert
- Greg Wiltjer
- Howard Kelsey
- Jay Triano
- John Hatch
- Karl Tilleman
- Romel Raffin

=== China ===
The following players represented China:

- Hu Zhangbao
- Huang Yunlong
- Ji Zhaoguang
- Kuang Lubin
- Li Yaguang
- Liu Jianli
- Lü Jinqing
- Sun Fengwu
- Wang Haibo
- Wang Libin
- Zhang Bin

=== France ===
The following players represented France:

- Éric Beugnot
- Grégor Beugnot
- Patrick Cham
- Richard Dacoury
- Jean-Luc Deganis
- Hervé Dubuisson
- Bangaly Kaba
- Jacques Monclar
- Stéphane Ostrowski
- Jean-Michel Sénégal
- Philippe Szanyiel
- Georges Vestris

=== Spain ===
The following players represented Spain:

- José Manuel Beirán
- José Luis Llorente
- Fernando Arcega
- Josep Maria Margall
- Andrés Jiménez
- Fernando Romay
- Fernando Martín
- Juan Antonio Corbalán
- Ignacio Solozábal
- Juan de la Cruz
- Juan Manuel López
- Juan Antonio San Epifanio

=== United States ===
The following players represented the United States:

- Steve Alford
- Leon Wood
- Patrick Ewing
- Vern Fleming
- Alvin Robertson
- Michael Jordan
- Joe Kleine
- Jon Koncak
- Wayman Tisdale
- Chris Mullin
- Sam Perkins
- Jeff Turner

=== Uruguay ===
The following players represented Uruguay:

- Víctor Frattini
- Luis Larrosa
- Horacio López
- Juan Mignone
- Hébert Núñez
- Carlos Peinado
- Horacio Perdomo
- Julio Pereyra
- Luis Pierri
- Wilfredo Ruiz
- Álvaro Tito
