= 1984 Tournament of the Americas squads =

This article displays the rosters for the participating teams at the 1984 Tournament of the Americas played in São Paulo, Brazil from May 15 to May 24, 1984.

== Argentina ==
- 4 Esteban Camisassa
- 5 Daniel Aréjula
- 6 Jorge Faggiano
- 7 Rubén Fernández
- 8 Carlos Romano
- 9 Sebastián Uranga
- 10 Adolfo Perazzo
- 11 Miguel Cortijo
- 12 Eduardo Cadillac
- 13 Gabriel Milovich
- 14 Luis Oroño
- 15 Luis González

- Head coach: (Argentina) Heriberto Schonwies

== Brazil ==
- 4 Nilo
- 5 Sílvio
- 6 Gerson
- 7 Carioquinha
- 8 Cadum
- 9 Marquinhos
- 10 Paulinho
- 11 Rolando
- 12 Adilson
- 13 Marcelo
- 14 Oscar
- 15 Israel

- Head coach: (Brazil) Cláudio Mortari

== Canada ==
- 4 Howie Kelsey
- 5 Tony Simms
- 6 Eli Pasquale
- 7 Karl Tilleman
- 8 Gerald Kazanowski
- 9 Jay Triano
- 10 John Hatch
- 11 Gordon Herbert
- 12 Bill Wennington
- 13 Romel Raffin
- 14 Greg Wiltjer
- 15 Dan Meagher

- Head coach: (United States) / (Canada) Jack Donohue

== Cuba ==
- 4 Pedro Abreu
- 5 Alberto Maturel
- 6 Roberto Simón
- 7 Noángel Luaces
- 8 Eduardo Cabrera
- 9 Raúl Dubois
- 10 Leonardo Pérez
- 11 Heriberto Lamerte
- 12 Tomás Herrera
- 13 Daniel Scott
- 14 Jorge Moré
- 15 Félix Morales

- Head coach: (Cuba) Pedro Chappé

== Dominican Republic ==
- 4 Máximo Tapia
- 5 Víctor Hansen
- 6 Evaristo Pérez Carrión
- 7 Luis Cruz
- 8 Tony Sánchez
- 9 José Domínguez
- 10 Winston Royal
- 11 Vinicio Muñoz
- 12 Víctor Chacón
- 14 José Vargas
- 15 Julián McKelly

- Head coach: (Dominican Republic) Fernando Teruel

== Mexico ==
- 4 Rafael Pineda
- 5 Víctor Flores
- 6 Julio Gallardo
- 7 Rafael Palomar
- 8 Guillermo Bayler
- 9 Óscar Ruiz
- 10 Enrique Ortega
- 11 Antonio Esquivel
- 12 Arturo Sánchez
- 13 José Luis Arroyos
- 14 Rafael Holguín
- 15 Norberto Mena

- Head coach: (Mexico) Gustavo Saggiante

== Panama ==
- 4 Tito Malcolm
- 5 Eddy Chávez
- 6 Enrique Grenald
- 7 Braulio Rivas
- 8 Mark Forbes
- 9 Alfonso Smith
- 10 Edgar Macías
- 11 Rolando Frazer
- 12 Rodolfo Gil
- 13 Cedric Bailey
- 14 Adolfo Medrick
- 15 Mario Butler

- Head coach: (United States) Carl Pirelli-Minetti

== Puerto Rico ==
- 4 Orlando Marrero
- 5 Richie Hernández
- 6 José Sosa
- 7 Wesley Correa
- 8 Rubén Rodríguez
- 9 Willie Quiñones
- 10 Angelo Cruz
- 11 Ángel Santiago
- 12 Mario Morales
- 13 Néstor Cora
- 14 Jerome Mincy
- 15 José Ortiz

- Head coach: (Puerto Rico) Julio Toro

== Uruguay ==
- 4 Horacio López
- 5 Luis Larrosa
- 6 Luis Pierri
- 7 Hébert Núñez
- 8 Wilfredo Ruiz
- 9 Horacio Perdomo
- 10 Carlos Peinado
- 11 Walter Pagani
- 12 Julio Pereyra
- 13 Álvaro Tito
- 14 Juan Mignone
- 15 Víctor Frattini

- Head coach: (Uruguay) Ramón Etchamendi

== Bibliography ==
- Mexico 2015 FIBA Americas Championship Guía Histórica 1980–2015 (in Spanish). FIBA. 2015. pp. 17–23.

== See also ==
- 1984 Tournament of the Americas
- Basketball at the 1984 Summer Olympics
- FIBA AmeriCup
- FIBA
