= Tunisia at the 1984 Summer Olympics =

- IOC code: TUN
- NOC: Tunisian Olympic Committee

in Los Angeles
- Competitors: 23 in 6 sports
- Flag bearer: Fethi Baccouche
- Medals: Gold 0 Silver 0 Bronze 0 Total 0

Summer Olympics appearances (overview)
- 1960; 1964; 1968; 1972; 1976; 1980; 1984; 1988; 1992; 1996; 2000; 2004; 2008; 2012; 2016; 2020; 2024; 2028

Tunisia competed at the 1984 Summer Olympics in Los Angeles, United States. The nation returned to the Olympic Games after participating in the American-led boycott of the 1980 Summer Olympics.

== Athletics ==
Men
Track & road events

Athlete	Event	Heat		Quarterfinal		Semifinal		Final	
Athlete	Event	Result	Rank	Result	Rank	Result	Rank	Result	Rank
Mohamed Alouini	800 m	1:47.20	19 Q	1:45.78	5	Did not advance			
Mohamed Alouini	1500 m	3:49.78	6	Did not advance					
Fethi Baccouche	5000 m	DNF		Did not advance					
Fethi Baccouche	3000 m steeplechase	8:27.49	19 Q	—N/a		8:18.70	6 Q	8:43.40	12

== Boxing ==
Men

Athlete	Event	1 Round	2 Round	3 Round	Quarterfinals	Semifinals	Final
Athlete	Event	Opposition Result	Opposition Result	Opposition Result	Opposition Result	Opposition Result	Rank
Noureddine Boughani	Featherweight	BYE	Satoru Higashi (JPN); L 1–4	Did not advance			
Lofti Belkhir	Light welterweight	BYE	Kunihiro Miuro (JPN); W 4–1	Roshdy Armanios (EGY); W 5–0	Mircea Fulger (ROU); L 0–5	Did not advance	5
Khemais Refai	Welterweight	BYE	Konrad König (AUT); L RSC-1	Genaro Léon (MEX); L 2–3	Did not advance		

== Judo ==
Men

Athlete	Event	Round 1	Round 2	Round 3	Quarterfinal	Semifinal	Repechage 1	Repechage 2	Final / BM
Athlete	Event	Opposition Result	Opposition Result	Opposition Result	Opposition Result	Opposition Result	Opposition Result	Opposition Result	Rank
Hassan Ben Gamra	Lightweight	BYE	Ronald Khawam (LIB); W 1000–0000	Luiz Onmura (BRA); L 0000–0100	Did not advance				
Abdel Majid Senoussi	Half Heavyweight	BYE		Günther Neureuther (FRG); L 0000–0001	Did not advance				
Bechir Kiiari	Open	—N/a		Mohamed Rashwan (EGY); L 0000–1000	—N/a		Mihai Cioc (ROU); L 0000–1000	Did not advance	

== Swimming ==
Women

Athlete	Event	Heat		Semifinal		Final	
Athlete	Event	Time	Rank	Time	Rank	Time	Rank
Faten Ghattas	100 metre freestyle	1:02.00	35	Did not advance			
Faten Ghattas	200 metre freestyle	DNS		Did not advance			
Faten Ghattas	400 metre freestyle	DNS		Did not advance			
Faten Ghattas	100 metre butterfly	1:05.91	25	Did not advance			
Faten Ghattas	200 metre butterfly	2:22.68	25	Did not advance			
Faten Ghattas	200 metre individual medley	2:29.77	23	Did not advance			
Faten Ghattas	400 metre individual medley	DNS		Did not advance			

== Volleyball ==
=== Men's team competition ===
==== Preliminary round ====
Pool A

Pos	Team	Pld	W	L	Pts	SW	SL	SR	SPW	SPL	SPR	Qualification
1	Brazil	4	3	1	7	10	4	2.500	191	144	1.326	Semifinals
2	United States	4	3	1	7	9	4	2.250	168	117	1.436	Semifinals
3	South Korea	4	3	1	7	9	6	1.500	203	162	1.253	5th–8th semifinals
4	Argentina	4	1	3	5	7	9	0.778	184	207	0.889	5th–8th semifinals
5	Tunisia	4	0	4	4	0	12	0.000	64	180	0.356	9th place match

Date		Score		Set 1	Set 2	Set 3	Set 4	Set 5	Total
29 Jul	South Korea	3–0	Tunisia	15–7	15–7	15–7			45–21
31 Jul	United States	3–0	Tunisia	15–3	15–2	15–3			45–8
02 Aug	Brazil	3–0	Tunisia	15–5	15–9	15–2			45–16
04 Aug	Argentina	3–0	Tunisia	15–9	15–7	15–3			45–19

==== 9th place match ====
Date		Score		Set 1	Set 2	Set 3	Set 4	Set 5	Total
08 Aug	Tunisia	3–2	Egypt	15–13	15–9	5–15	13–15	15–5	63–57

==== Team roster ====
- Faycal Laridhi
- Mohamed Barsar
- Rachid Bousarsar
- Ghazi Mhiri
- Msaddek Lahmar
- Mounir Barek
- Walid Boulehya
- Slim Maherzi
- Chebbi Mbarek
- Yassine Mezlini
- Aziz Ben Abdallah
- Adel Khechini

== Weightlifting ==
Men

Athlete	Event	Snatch		Clean & jerk		Total	Rank
Athlete	Event	Result	Rank	Result	Rank	Total	Rank
Taoufik Maaouia	−56 kg	0	AC	125.0	14	125.0	AC
Hatem Bouabid	−67,5 kg	0	AC	135.0	15	135.0	AC
