= Uruguay at the 1984 Summer Olympics =

- IOC code: URU
- NOC: Uruguayan Olympic Committee

in Los Angeles
- Competitors: 18 (17 men, 1 woman) in 5 sports
- Flag bearer: Carlos Peinado
- Medals: Gold 0 Silver 0 Bronze 0 Total 0

Summer Olympics appearances (overview)
- 1924; 1928; 1932; 1936; 1948; 1952; 1956; 1960; 1964; 1968; 1972; 1976; 1980; 1984; 1988; 1992; 1996; 2000; 2004; 2008; 2012; 2016; 2020; 2024

Uruguay competed at the 1984 Summer Olympics in Los Angeles, United States. The nation returned to the Olympic Games after participating in the American-led boycott of the 1980 Summer Olympics. Eighteen competitors, seventeen men and one woman, took part in eleven events in five sports.

== Basketball ==
=== Men's team competition ===
- Preliminary Round (Group B)

- Defeated France (91-87)
- Lost to Spain (90-107)
- Lost to United States (68-104)
- Lost to Canada (80-95)
- Defeated PR China (74-67)

- Quarterfinals

- Lost to Yugoslavia (82-110)

- Classification Matches

- 5th/8th place: Defeated Australia (101-95)
- 5th/6th place: Lost to Italy (102-111) → Sixth place

- Team Roster

- Víctor Frattini
- Luis Larrosa
- Horacio López
- Juan Mignone
- Hébert Núñez
- Walter Pagani
- Carlos Peinado
- Julio Pereyra
- Luis Pierri
- Wilfredo Ruiz
- Alvaro Tito
- Horacio Perdomo

== Boxing ==
- Honorio Masón

== Cycling ==
One cyclist represented Uruguay in 1984.

- Carlos García
  - Men's points race — 32nd
  - Men's 1 km time trial — NP (→ no ranking)
  - Men's individual pursuit — Lost in Round 1

== Sailing ==
- Enrique Dupont
- Alejandro Ferreiro
- Bernd Knuppel

== Swimming ==
Men's 200m Freestyle

- Carlos Scanavino

- Heat — 1:52.70
- B-Final — 1:52.54 (→ 13th place)

Men's 400m Freestyle

- Carlos Scanavino

- Heat — 3:55.92
- B-Final — scratched (→ did not advance, 17th place)

Men's 1500m Freestyle

- Carlos Scanavino

- Heat — 15:29.78 (→ did not advance, 10th place)

Men's 100m Butterfly

- Carlos Scanavino

- Heat — 57.46 (→ did not advance, 31st place)

Women's 200m Individual Medley

- Rosa Silva

- Heat — DSQ (→ did not advance, no ranking)
