= Basketball at the 1982 Asian Games =

- Venue: Jawaharlal Nehru Stadium
- Date: 20 November – 3 December 1982
- Nations: 13

Basketball was one of the 21 sports disciplines held in the 1982 Asian Games in New Delhi, India. South Korea defeated China in the championship rematch and won their 2nd Asian Games title. The games were held from 20 November – 3 December 1982.

== Medalists ==
Event	Gold	Silver	Bronze
Men	South Korea; An Jun-ho; Cho Myung-soo; Lee Chung-hee; Lee Jang-soo; Lee Min-hyun; Lee Young-keun; Lim Jung-myung; Park In-kyu; Park Jong-chun; Park Soo-kyo; Shin Dong-chan; Shin Sun-woo	China; Feng Wei; Han Pengshan; Huang Yunlong; Ji Zhaoguang; Kuang Lubin; Li Qiuping; Li Yaguang; Liu Jianli; Lü Jinqing; Sun Fengwu; Wang Libin; Xu Yuansheng	Japan; Toshiharu Baba; Yasuaki Ikeuchi; Nobuki Kato; Norihiko Kitahara; Katsushige Kumagai; Masaaki Mikami; Yasuyuki Nakajima; Yasutaka Okayama; Shuji Ono; Hiroyuki Otsuka; Takayuki Seto; Kanji Takaki
Women	China; Chen Yuefang; Liu Min; Liu Qing; Qiu Chen; Song Xiaobo; Sun Ruiyun; Xian Liqing; Xiu Lijuan; You Shumin; Zhang Hui; Zhang Liuru; Zhang Yueqin	South Korea; Bang Shin-sil; Cha Yang-sook; Hong He-ran; Hong Young-soon; Kim Hwa-soon; Kim Young-hee; Kwon Myung-hee; Park Chan-sook; Park Jin-sook; Park Yang-gae; Sung Jung-a; Woo Eun-kyung	Japan; Nanae Fujii; Setsuko Hashizume; Shoko Ito; Hiromi Kinjo; Yuko Kizuka; Kumi Kubota; Shigeko Kumagai; Mari Nehyo; Kazumi Shimizu; Mari Suzuki; Mika Sugihara; Noriko Tanaka

== Medal table ==
Rank	Nation	Gold	Silver	Bronze	Total
1	China (CHN)	1	1	0	2
1	South Korea (KOR)	1	1	0	2
3	Japan (JPN)	0	0	2	2
Totals (3 entries)		2	2	2	6

== Results ==
=== Men ===
==== Preliminary round ====
===== Group A =====
Pos	Team	Pld	W	L	PF	PA	PD	Pts	Qualification
1	China	2	2	0	200	150	+50	4	Final round
2	North Korea	2	1	1	173	168	+5	3	Final round
3	Iraq	2	0	2	127	182	−55	2	Classification 9th–13th

Source: Results

20 November

China	96–63	Iraq

Jawaharlal Nehru Stadium, New Delhi

22 November

China	104–87	North Korea

Jawaharlal Nehru Stadium, New Delhi

24 November

North Korea	86–64	Iraq

Jawaharlal Nehru Stadium, New Delhi

===== Group B =====
Pos	Team	Pld	W	L	PF	PA	PD	Pts	Qualification
1	South Korea	2	2	0	209	146	+63	4	Final round
2	Kuwait	2	1	1	187	186	+1	3	Final round
3	Bahrain	2	0	2	153	217	−64	2	Classification 9th–13th

Source: Results

21 November

Kuwait	111–83	Bahrain

Jawaharlal Nehru Stadium, New Delhi

23 November

South Korea	103–76	Kuwait

Jawaharlal Nehru Stadium, New Delhi

25 November

South Korea	106–70	Bahrain

Jawaharlal Nehru Stadium, New Delhi

===== Group C =====
Pos	Team	Pld	W	L	PF	PA	PD	Pts	Qualification
1	Japan	2	2	0	198	99	+99	4	Final round
2	Malaysia	2	1	1	168	110	+58	3	Final round
3	South Yemen	2	0	2	83	240	−157	2	Classification 9th–13th

Source: Results

20 November

Japan	131–40	South Yemen

Jawaharlal Nehru Stadium, New Delhi

22 November

Malaysia	109–43	South Yemen

Jawaharlal Nehru Stadium, New Delhi

24 November

Japan	67–59	Malaysia

Jawaharlal Nehru Stadium, New Delhi

===== Group D =====
Pos	Team	Pld	W	L	PF	PA	PD	Pts	Qualification
1	Philippines	3	3	0	400	221	+179	6	Final round
2	India	3	2	1	345	201	+144	5	Final round
3	United Arab Emirates	3	1	2	261	251	+10	4	Classification 9th–13th
4	North Yemen	3	0	3	118	451	−333	3	Classification 9th–13th

Source: Results

20 November

United Arab Emirates	121–44	North Yemen

Jawaharlal Nehru Stadium, New Delhi

21 November

India	98–59	United Arab Emirates

Jawaharlal Nehru Stadium, New Delhi

22 November

Philippines	183–40	North Yemen

Jawaharlal Nehru Stadium, New Delhi

23 November

India	147–34	North Yemen

Jawaharlal Nehru Stadium, New Delhi

24 November

Philippines	109–81	United Arab Emirates

Jawaharlal Nehru Stadium, New Delhi

25 November

Philippines	108–100	India

Jawaharlal Nehru Stadium, New Delhi

==== Classification 9th–13th ====
Team	Pld	W	L
Iraq	4	4	0
Bahrain	4	3	1
United Arab Emirates	4	2	2
South Yemen	4	1	3
North Yemen	4	0	4

26 November

Bahrain	125–44	North Yemen

Jawaharlal Nehru Stadium, New Delhi

26 November

South Yemen	44–112	United Arab Emirates

Jawaharlal Nehru Stadium, New Delhi

27 November

Iraq	251–33	North Yemen

Jawaharlal Nehru Stadium, New Delhi

27 November

Bahrain	107–46	South Yemen

Jawaharlal Nehru Stadium, New Delhi

28 November

Iraq	103–60	United Arab Emirates

Jawaharlal Nehru Stadium, New Delhi

28 November

South Yemen	102–53	North Yemen

Jawaharlal Nehru Stadium, New Delhi

29 November

Iraq	2–0	South Yemen
Walkover

Jawaharlal Nehru Stadium, New Delhi

29 November

Bahrain	74–68	United Arab Emirates

Jawaharlal Nehru Stadium, New Delhi

30 November

Iraq	97–72	Bahrain

Jawaharlal Nehru Stadium, New Delhi

==== Final round ====
Team	Pld	W	L
South Korea	7	7	0
China	7	6	1
Japan	7	5	2
Philippines	7	3	4
North Korea	7	3	4
Kuwait	7	2	5
Malaysia	7	2	5
India	7	0	7

26 November

China	98–89	Japan

Jawaharlal Nehru Stadium, New Delhi

26 November

Kuwait	vs.	Malaysia

Jawaharlal Nehru Stadium, New Delhi

26 November

North Korea	vs.	India

Jawaharlal Nehru Stadium, New Delhi

27 November

South Korea	132–99	Philippines

Jawaharlal Nehru Stadium, New Delhi

27 November

Kuwait	73–61	India

Jawaharlal Nehru Stadium, New Delhi

28 November

Japan	109–91	Philippines

Jawaharlal Nehru Stadium, New Delhi

28 November

China	104–49	Malaysia

Jawaharlal Nehru Stadium, New Delhi

28 November

South Korea	92–84	North Korea

Jawaharlal Nehru Stadium, New Delhi

29 November

China	94–58	Kuwait

Jawaharlal Nehru Stadium, New Delhi

29 November

North Korea	81–66	Malaysia

Jawaharlal Nehru Stadium, New Delhi

29 November

South Korea	91–90	Japan

Jawaharlal Nehru Stadium, New Delhi

30 November

Philippines	80–78	Kuwait

Jawaharlal Nehru Stadium, New Delhi

30 November

South Korea	97–88	India

Jawaharlal Nehru Stadium, New Delhi

1 December

China	121–96	Philippines

Jawaharlal Nehru Stadium, New Delhi

1 December

Japan	90–79	North Korea

Jawaharlal Nehru Stadium, New Delhi

1 December

Malaysia	78–72	India

Jawaharlal Nehru Stadium, New Delhi

2 December

China	120–94	India

Jawaharlal Nehru Stadium, New Delhi

2 December

Philippines	82–77	North Korea

Jawaharlal Nehru Stadium, New Delhi

2 December

South Korea	94–66	Malaysia

Jawaharlal Nehru Stadium, New Delhi

2 December

Japan	79–54	Kuwait

Jawaharlal Nehru Stadium, New Delhi

3 December

North Korea	86–81	Kuwait

Jawaharlal Nehru Stadium, New Delhi

3 December

Philippines	70–84	Malaysia

Jawaharlal Nehru Stadium, New Delhi

3 December

Japan	82–74	India

Jawaharlal Nehru Stadium, New Delhi

3 December

China	84–85	South Korea

Jawaharlal Nehru Stadium, New Delhi

==== Final classification ====
Rank	Team
Gold medal	South Korea
Silver medal	China
Bronze medal	Japan
4	Philippines
5	North Korea
6	Kuwait
7	Malaysia
8	India
9	Iraq
10	Bahrain
11	United Arab Emirates
12	South Yemen
13	North Yemen

=== Women ===
Pos	Team	Pld	W	L	PF	PA	PD	Pts
1	China	4	4	0	402	212	+190	8
2	South Korea	4	3	1	380	269	+111	7
3	Japan	4	2	2	290	310	−20	6
4	North Korea	4	1	3	303	338	−35	5
5	India	4	0	4	203	449	−246	4

Source: Results

20 November

India	59–103	North Korea

Jawaharlal Nehru Stadium, New Delhi

21 November

South Korea	93–76	Japan

Jawaharlal Nehru Stadium, New Delhi

23 November

China	125–48	India

Jawaharlal Nehru Stadium, New Delhi

24 November

Japan	85–76	North Korea

Jawaharlal Nehru Stadium, New Delhi

25 November

South Korea	127–56	India

Jawaharlal Nehru Stadium, New Delhi

26 November

Japan	94–40	India

Jawaharlal Nehru Stadium, New Delhi

27 November

China	101–35	Japan

Jawaharlal Nehru Stadium, New Delhi

28 November

South Korea	93–62	North Korea

Jawaharlal Nehru Stadium, New Delhi

30 November

China	101–62	North Korea

Jawaharlal Nehru Stadium, New Delhi

2 December

South Korea	67–75	China

Jawaharlal Nehru Stadium, New Delhi
