= Judo at the 1984 Summer Olympics – Men's 71 kg =

Judo at the Olympics

Men's 71 kg at the Games of the XXIII Olympiad
- Venue: California State University, Los Angeles
- Date: 6 August 1984
- Competitors: 31 from 31 nations

Medalists
1st place, gold medalist(s)		Ahn Byeong-keun	South Korea
2nd place, silver medalist(s)		Ezio Gamba	Italy
3rd place, bronze medalist(s)		Kerrith Brown	Great Britain
3rd place, bronze medalist(s)		Luiz Onmura	Brazil

The men's 71 kg competition in judo at the 1984 Summer Olympics in Los Angeles was held on 6 August at the California State University. The gold medal was won by Ahn Byeong-keun of South Korea.

== Results ==
=== Pool A ===
Round of 32
Glenn Beauchamp (CAN)	WO
Luis Chirinos (HON)	DNS
Tan Chin Kee (HKG)	E
Yi Dexin (CHN)	W
Shaun O'Leary (NZL)	E
Johannes Wohlwend (LIE)	W
Ezio Gamba (ITA)	W
Serge Dyot (FRA)	R
Rony Khawam (LIB)	E
Hassan Ben Gamra (TUN)	W
Yousry Zagloul (EGY)	E
Luiz Onmura (BRA)	W
Frank Evensen (NOR)	E
Mike Swain (USA)	W
Jean Claude N'Guessan (CIV)	E
Yousuf Al-Hammad (KUW)	W

Round of 16
Glenn Beauchamp (CAN)	W
Yi Dexin (CHN)	E
Johannes Wohlwend (LIE)	R
Ezio Gamba (ITA)	W
Hassan Ben Gamra (TUN)	E
Luiz Onmura (BRA)	W
Mike Swain (USA)	W
Yousuf Al-Hammad (KUW)	E

Quarterfinal
Glenn Beauchamp (CAN)	R
Ezio Gamba (ITA)	W
Luiz Onmura (BRA)	W
Mike Swain (USA)	E

Semifinal
Ezio Gamba (ITA)	W
Luiz Onmura (BRA)	R

=== Pool B ===
Round of 32
Liaw Der-cheng (TPE)	YUK
Michael Young (AUS)	E
Joaquín Ruiz (ESP)	WIP
Alvaro Sanabria (CRC)	E
Antti Hyvärinen (FIN)	E
Steffen Stranz (FRG)	IPO
Kerrith Brown (GBR)	YUS
Vojo Vujevic (YUG)	E
Ibrahima Diallo (SEN)	E
Hidetoshi Nakanishi (JPN)	HAN
Hugo d'Assunção (POR)	E
Federico Vizcarra (MEX)	WAZ
Alick Kalwihzi (ZAM)	E
Juan Vargas (USA)	IPO
Kieran Foley (IRL)	R
Ahn Byeong-keun (KOR)	IPO

Round of 16
Liaw Der-cheng (TPE)	YUK
Joaquín Ruiz (ESP)	E
Steffen Stranz (FRG)	E
Kerrith Brown (GBR)	IPO
Hidetoshi Nakanishi (JPN)	WAZ
Federico Vizcarra (MEX)	E
Juan Vargas (USA)	R
Ahn Byeong-keun (KOR)	WIP

Quarterfinal
Liaw Der-cheng (TPE)	E
Kerrith Brown (GBR)	KOK
Hidetoshi Nakanishi (JPN)	R
Ahn Byeong-keun (KOR)	YUK

Semifinal
Kerrith Brown (GBR)	R
Ahn Byeong-keun (KOR)	HAN

=== Repechages ===
Repechage		Repechage semifinal		Repechage final
Serge Dyot (FRA)	YUK
Johannes Wohlwend (LIE)	E	Serge Dyot (FRA)	E
		Glenn Beauchamp (CAN)	YUS
				Glenn Beauchamp (CAN)	E
				Luiz Onmura (BRA)	KOK (bronze)

Repechage		Repechage semifinal		Repechage final
Kieran Foley (IRL)	IPO
Juan Vargas (ESA)	E	Kieran Foley (IRL)	E
		Hidetoshi Nakanishi (JPN)	YUK
				Hidetoshi Nakanishi (JPN)	E
				Kerrith Brown (GBR)	KOK (bronze)

=== Final ===
Final
Ezio Gamba (ITA)	2nd place, silver medalist(s)
Ahn Byeong-keun (KOR)	KOK (gold)

== Final classification ==
Rank	Judoka	Nation
1st place, gold medalist(s)	Ahn Byeong-keun	South Korea
2nd place, silver medalist(s)	Ezio Gamba	Italy
3rd place, bronze medalist(s)	Kerrith Brown	Great Britain
3rd place, bronze medalist(s)	Luiz Onmura	Brazil
5T	Glenn Beauchamp	Canada
5T	Hidetoshi Nakanishi	Japan
7T	Kieran Foley	Ireland
7T	Serge Dyot	France
9T	Johannes Wohlwend	Liechtenstein
9T	Juan Vargas	El Salvador
11T	Mike Swain	United States
11T	Liaw Der-cheng	Chinese Taipei
13T	Yi Dexin	China
13T	Federico Vizcarra	Mexico
13T	Hassan Ben Gamra	Tunisia
13T	Yousuf Al-Hammad	Kuwait
13T	Joaquín Ruiz	Spain
13T	Steffen Stranz	West Germany
19T	Tan Chin Kee	Hong Kong
19T	Shaun O'Leary	New Zealand
19T	Jean Claude N'Guessan	Ivory Coast
19T	Rony Khawam	Lebanon
19T	Yousry Zagloul	Egypt
19T	Frank Evensen	Norway
19T	Michael Young	Australia
19T	Alvaro Sanabria	Costa Rica
19T	Antti Hyvärinen	Finland
19T	Vojo Vujevic	Yugoslavia
19T	Ibrahima Diallo	Senegal
19T	Hugo d'Assunção	Portugal
19T	Alick Kalwihzi	Zambia
