= Barek =

Barek is a surname. Notable people with the surname include:

- Jiří Barek (born 1949), Czech electroanalytical chemist and university teacher of analytical chemistry
- Mohammad Abdul Barek, Jatiya Party (Ershad) politician
- Mounir Barek (born 1960), Tunisian volleyball player
