= Ehab =

Ehab is a masculine given name and surname of Arabic origin. Notable people with the name include:

== Given name ==
- Ehab Abouheif (born 1971), Canadian biologist, Professor in the Department of Biology at McGill University
- Ehab Allam (born 1971), British-Egyptian business executive and former vice-chairman of Hull City
- Ehab Amin (born 1995), Egyptian professional basketball player for Al Ahly
- Ehab Bessaiso (born 1978), Palestinian poet, architect, and politician
- Ehab Galal (1967–2024), Egyptian former football player and manager
- Ehab Moustafa Mansour (born 1968), Egyptian field hockey player
- Ehab El Masry (born 1985), Egyptian football striker
- Ehab Mohamed (born 1957), Egyptian volleyball player
- Ehab Fuad Ahmed Nagi (born 1968), former South Yemeni Olympic athlete
- Ehab Al Shihabi (born 1970), Jordanian-American media professional with Al Jazeera Media Network
- Ehab Tawfik (born 1966), Egyptian singer

== Surname ==
- Mohamed Ehab (born 1989), Egyptian weightlifter, and World Champion in the 77 kg category

== See also ==
- Chehab (disambiguation)
- Mehtab (disambiguation)
