= Chemistry Quality Eurolabels =

Chemistry degree marketing scheme

The Chemistry Quality Eurolabels or European Quality Labels in Chemistry (Labels européens de Qualité en Chimie) is a marketing scheme for chemistry degrees at institutions located within the 45 countries involved in the Bologna process. Labels are awarded to qualifying institutions under the names are Eurobachelor and Euromaster, as well as the proposed Eurodoctorate. Label Committee not only prepares for the ECTN Administrative Council proposals to award the Eurolabels but also judge the quality of chemical education programmes at HEIs. ECTN and its Label Committee closely collaborates with EuCheMS and American Chemical Society.

It is a framework which is supported by EuCheMS, and the labels are awarded by ECTN. The project is supported by the European Commission (EC) through its SOCRATES programme. The purpose of the framework is to "promote recognition of first, second cycle degrees, and third cycle degrees not only within the 45 countries involved in the Bologna process".

== History ==
European Union promoted the Bologna process and the creation of a single European higher education area, both of which require mobility of graduates across Europe.

ECTN (European Chemistry Thematic Network) worked in the EU project "Tuning Educational Structures in Europe" and developed Eurobachelor, a framework for a first cycle qualification (first degree) in chemistry. EuCheMS approved Eurobachelor in October 2003.

In June 2004 the Bologna process seminar "Chemistry Studies in the European Higher Education Area" approved Eurobachelor.

== Label committees ==
The label committee members are as follows:

=== 2016–2018 ===
- Reiner Salzer (Chair), TU Dresden, Dresden, Germany
- Martino Di Serio (Vice-Chair), University of Naples Federico II, Naples, Italy
- Jiří Barek (Secretary for Internal Matters), Charles University, Prague, Czech Republic
- Gergely Tóth (Secretary for External Matters), Eötvös Loránd University, Budapest, Hungary

=== 2015–2016 ===
- Reiner Salzer (Chair), TU Dresden, Dresden, Germany
- Martino Di Serio (Vice-Chair), University of Naples Federico II, Naples, Italy
- Ray Wallace (Secretary), Nottingham Trent University, Nottingham, UK
- a number of members

=== 2014–2015 ===
- Reiner Salzer (Chair), TU Dresden, Dresden, Germany
- Pavel Drašar (Past-Chair), University of Chemistry and Technology, Prague, Czech Republic
- Ray Wallace (Secretary), Nottingham Trent University, Nottingham, UK
- a number of members

=== 2013–2014 ===
- Reiner Salzer (Chair), TU Dresden, Dresden, Germany
- Pavel Drašar (Past-Chair), University of Chemistry and Technology, Prague, Czech Republic
- Evangelia Varella (Secretary), University of Thessaloniki, Thessaloniki, Greece
- a number of members

=== 2008–2013 ===
- Pavel Drašar (Chair), University of Chemistry and Technology, Prague, Czech Republic
- Reiner Salzer (Vice-Chair), TU Dresden, Dresden, Germany
- Richard Whewell (Secretary 2008), Strathclyde University, Glasgow, Scotland, UK
- Evangelia Varella (Secretary 2008–2013), University of Thessaloniki, Thessaloniki, Greece
- a number of members

=== 2006–2008 ===
- Raffaella Pagani (Chair)
- Pavel Drašar (Vice-Chair), University of Chemistry and Technology, Prague, Czech Republic
- Terry Mitchell (Secretary)
- a number of members

=== 2004–2006 ===
- Terry Mitchell (Chair)
- Raffaella Pagani (Vice-Chair)
- David Barr (Secretary), Royal Society of Chemistry, UK
- a number of members

== Eurobachelor ==
Eurobachelor is a registered trademark and an initiative adopted by the EuCheMS General Assembly in 2003. It is associated with the Chemistry Quality Eurolabels. As of 8 April 2013, 60 Eurobachelor quality labels have been awarded. The label is intended for first cycle qualifications (bachelor's degrees).

Eurobachelor is based on 180 ECTS (European credits), which is comparable to the three-year British degrees, but it does not include the British concepts of honours degrees and ordinary degrees.

== Euromaster ==
Euromaster is a registered trademark and an initiative adopted by the EuCheMS General Assembly in 2005. It is associated with the Chemistry Quality Eurolabels. As of 8 April 2013, 36 Euromaster quality labels have been awarded. The label is intended for master's degrees.

Euromaster, introduced after Eurobachelor, is intended for second cycle qualifications (postgraduate degrees).

== Eurodoctorate ==
Eurodoctorate is associated with the Chemistry Quality Eurolabels. As of 8 April 2013, 1 Eurodoctorate quality label was awarded. The label is intended for third cycle qualifications (i.e. doctoral degrees).

The Tuning Chemistry Subject Area Group (Tuning SAG) discussed with a working party of ECTN (European Chemistry Thematic Network Association) in a meeting held in February 2006 in Helsinki, Finland, taking into account the declarations of the Bergen Communiqué 2005. The EHEA Overarching Framework, which was approved by the Ministers of Education of European Union member states in Bergen uses the Dublin descriptors and Tuning SAG decided to use the Dublin descriptors to form a new set of descriptors, the Budapest descriptors for third cycle qualifications.

The Chemistry Eurodoctorate Framework version 1 was published in November 2006.

== Awarded labels ==
As of 8 April 2013, 60 Eurobachelor, 36 Euromaster, and 1 Eurodoctorate labels have been awarded to 52 institutions and 3 consortia from 20 countries.

The countries that have been awarded labels include:

- Austria
- Belgium
- Czech Republic
- Estonia
- Finland
- France
- Germany
- Greece
- Hungary
- Ireland
- Italy
- Kazakhstan
- Morocco
- Netherlands
- Poland
- Portugal
- Slovakia
- Slovenia
- Spain
- United Kingdom

== See also ==
- Bologna process
- European higher education area
- European Chemistry Thematic Network Association
- EChemTest
- Tuning Educational Structures in Europe (European Union project)
- EuCheMS (European Association for Chemical and Molecular Sciences)
- Tuning Chemistry Subject Area Group
- Dublin descriptor
- European Quality Labels
