= Journal of Solution Chemistry =

Scientific journal on solution chemistry

- Discipline: Solution chemistry, physical chemistry
- Language: English
- Edited by: Magdalena Bendova and Earle Waghorne

Publication details
- History: 1972–present
- Publisher: Springer
- Frequency: Monthly
- Impact factor: 1.3 (2024)

Standard abbreviations
- ISO 4: J. Solut. Chem.

Indexing
- ISSN: 0095-9782 (print); 1572-8927 (web)
- LCCN: 2004233316
- OCLC no.: 173716070

Links
- Journal homepage; Online access; Online archive

Journal of Solution Chemistry is a peer-reviewed scientific journal published monthly by Springer. It covers fundamental and applied research in physical chemistry of complex liquid solutions. It was established in 1972 and its editor-in-chiefs are Magdalena Bendova (University of Chemistry and Technology, Prague) and Earle Waghorne (University College Dublin).

== Abstracting and indexing ==
The journal is abstracted and indexed in:

- Chemical Abstracts Core
- Current Contents/Physical, Chemical & Earth Sciences
- EBSCO databases
- Ei Compendex
- Inspec
- ProQuest databases
- Science Citation Index Expanded
- Scopus

According to the Journal Citation Reports, the journal has a 2024 impact factor of 1.3.
