= CS Sfaxien =

Association football club in Tunisia

Club Sfaxien
- Full name: Club Sportif Sfaxien
- Nickname: Juventus El Arab (The Arabian Juventus) "Bianconero" / "El Ka7la Wel Bidha".
- Short name: CSS
- Founded: 28 May 1928; 98 years ago (as Club Tunisien)
- Ground: Taieb Mhiri Stadium
- Capacity: 15,000
- Chairman: Mehdi Frikha
- Coach: Mohamed Kouki
- League: Tunisian Ligue Professionnelle 1
- 2025–26: Ligue 1, 3rd of 16
- Website: www.css.org.tn
colours	colours	colours

Club Sportif Sfaxien (Arabic: النادي الرياضي الصفاقسي), known as CS Sfaxien or simply CSS colloquially, is a Tunisian football club based in Sfax. The club was founded in 1928 and its colours are black and white (Bianconero). Their home stadium, Taieb Mhiri Stadium, has a capacity of 12,000 spectators. The club is currently playing in the Tunisian Ligue Professionnelle 1.

== History ==
The club was founded in 1928 as Club Tunisien, playing in green and red stripes. The team was promoted to the Tunisian First Division in 1947. In 1950, the first supporters group was founded by Béchir Fendri, and in 1962 the club was renamed "Club Sportif Sfaxien" and team colours were changed to the current black and white stripes.

CSS celebrated their half-centenary in 1978 by winning the Tunisian League title. In November 1998, CSS captured the CAF Cup for the first time, beating Senegal's ASC Jeanne d'Arc in the final.

In more recent times, CSS reached the final of the CAF Champions League 2006 but were beaten with a late second leg goal condemning them to a 2–1 aggregate defeat against Al Ahly of Egypt.

In September 2014, CSS reached the semi-finals of the CAF Champions League 2014 but they were beaten with a 2–1 score in both away and home matches against AS Vita Club.

In May 2015, CSS got disqualified from The CAF Champions League 2015 after a loss with 1–0 in their away match against Mouloudia Chabab El Eulma(Algeria) and then CSS won their match in Sfax with 1–0 at the Stade Taïeb Mhiri but they got disqualified since they lost by penalties (7–6).

CSS won the 2007 CAF Confederation Cup. A 4–2 first-leg victory in Sudan against Al Merreikh preceded a 1–0 second leg win, with CSS lifting the trophy in front of their own fans at the Stade Taïeb Mhiri. In November 2008, CSS faced local rivals Etoile du Sahel (ESS) in the final of the CAF Confederation Cup. CSS became the most successful club in recent history of the tournament when a 0–0 draw in Sfax was followed by a 2–2 draw in Sousse, sending the cup back to Sfax for the second year in a row.

2009 saw the club win the Tunisian Cup.

In 2013, CSS won CAF Confederation Cup for the 3rd time in their history facing TP Mazembe in the final with 2–0 in Rades then a 2–1 defeat in Lubumbashi with a late goal from Fakhreddine Ben Youssef.

Club Sfaxien participated in the 2017 CAF Confederation Cup.

In the 2018–19 the club won the Tunisian Cup again. The club won the Tunisian FA Cup for a sixth time on 28 June 2021and for a seventh time on 10 September 2022 against AS Marsa.

== SOCIOS-CSS ==
The SOCIOS-CSS network is an internal body attached to the executive committee of the Club Sportif Sfaxien, to which it is fully dependent and responsible for carrying out the missions indicated in this Internal Regulation. Launched on 28 May 2008, it became a permanent structure of Club Sportif Sfaxien following the revision of the club's status during the extraordinary general assembly of 19 May 2011.

Since its inception in 2008, the SOCIOS-CSS network has been investing in projects of all sizes on behalf of Club Sportif Sfaxien. The SOCIOS-CSS network is represented abroad by SOCIOS CSS INTERNATIONAL, a French association under the 1901 law, number W751189505, based in France. The funds collected by this association are the property of Club Sportif Sfaxien and will be managed within the framework of the SOCIOS-CSS network concept. The SOCIOS CSS INTERNATIONAL association is required to prepare a semi-annual report on its activities and finances. This report is transmitted to the SOCIOS-CSS Bureau to ensure follow-up. Members of SOCIOS CSS INTERNATIONAL are full-fledged members of the SOCIOS-CSS network and enjoy all the benefits of SOCIOS-CSS members.

=== Partnership ===
In addition to the celebration of the 87th anniversary of Club Sportif Sfaxien, SOCIOS-CSS signed a membership protocol with Sandlanders Football, whereby SOCIOS-CSS joins an international network of clubs working for the development of sports clubs and sustainable infrastructure. The signing took place on Saturday 30 May 2015.

== Players ==
=== Current squad ===
As of 15 September 2026

Note: Flags indicate national team as defined under FIFA eligibility rules; some limited exceptions apply. Players may hold more than one non-FIFA nationality.

No.	Pos.	Nation	Player
1	GK	TUN	Mohamed Hedi Gaaloul
3	DF	TUN	Mohamed Amine Ben Ali
4	MF	TUN	Youssef Habchia
5	DF	TUN	Abdessalem Akid
6	MF	TUN	Mohamed Absi
7	MF	TUN	Ghaith Sghaier
8	MF	TUN	Rayan Chaâban
9	FW	CGO	Josna Loulendo
10	DF	TUN	Ali Maâloul (captain)
11	FW	TUN	Iyed Belwafi
12	MF	UGA	Travis Mutyaba
13	DF	TUN	Rayane Derbali
15	DF	COD	Kévin Mondeko
17	DF	TUN	Mohamed Salah Mhadhebi
18	FW	NGR	Emmanuel Agaba Ogbole

No.	Pos.	Nation	Player
19	MF	TUN	Nour Karoui
20	MF	TUN	Walid Dhouib
21	DF	TUN	Hichem Baccar
22	GK	TUN	Abdessalem Hallaoui
23	MF	TUN	Mohamed Amine Aidi
24	DF	TUN	Hamza Mathlouthi
25	MF	UGA	Hakim Mutebi
27	MF	MLI	Bouara Diarra
29	FW	TUN	Noomen Rahmani
30	GK	TUN	Aymen Dahmen
31	GK	TUN	Mohamed Ali Jamiaa
32	MF	BFA	Hasamadou Ouédraogo
33	MF	TUN	Mohamed Trabelsi
35	DF	TUN	Mohamed Amine Ben Ncir

=== Out on loan ===
Note: Flags indicate national team as defined under FIFA eligibility rules; some limited exceptions apply. Players may hold more than one non-FIFA nationality.

No.	Pos.	Nation	Player
—	DF	TUN	Adem Saidi (at PS Sakiet Eddaïer until 30 June 2026)
—	DF	TUN	Ahmed Ajjal (at AS Kasserine until 30 June 2026)
—	DF	TUN	Khalil Elloumi (at OC Kerkennah until 30 June 2026)
—	MF	TUN	Jasser Maaroufi (at AS Agareb until 30 June 2026)
—	MF	TUN	Aziz Sekrafi (at AS Gabès until 30 June 2026)
—	MF	TUN	Mohamed Islem Gasmi (at ES Métlaoui until 30 June 2026)
—	FW	TUN	Ameur Jouini (at AS Gabès until 30 June 2026)
—	FW	TUN	Mohamed Mahdi Kachouri (at SC Ben Arous until 30 June 2026)

=== Retired numbers ===
Note: Flags indicate national team as defined under FIFA eligibility rules; some limited exceptions apply. Players may hold more than one non-FIFA nationality.

No.	Pos.	Nation	Player
8	MF	TUN	Hamadi Agrebi

== Honours ==
Source: Soccerway

Type	Competition	Titles	Winning Seasons
Domestic	Tunisian Ligue Professionnelle 1	8	1968–69, 1970–71, 1977–78, 1980–81, 1982–83, 1994–95, 2004–05, 2012–13
Domestic	Tunisian Cup	7	1970–71, 1994–95, 2003–04, 2008–09, 2018–19, 2020–21, 2021–22
Domestic	Tunisian League Cup	1	2002–03
Continental	CAF Confederation Cup	3	2007, 2008, 2013
Continental	CAF Cup	1	1998
Regional	Arab Club Champions Cup	2	2000, 2004
Regional	North African Cup Winners Cup	1	2009

- record

== Performance in CAF competitions ==
- CAF Champions League:

1984 – First round
1996 – Semi-finals
2006 – Runner-up
2014 – Semi-finals

- CAF Confederation Cup:

2007 – Winner
2008 – Winner
2010 – Runner-up

2012 – First round
2013 – Winner

- CAF Super Cup:

2008 – Runner-up
2009 – Runner-up
2014 – Runner-up

- CAF Cup:

1998 – Winner

== Managers ==
Nat	Name	Period
(Tunisia)	Taoufik Ben Salama	1947–1948
(France)	Xavier Scotto	1948–1949
(France)	Marc Orsoni	1949–1950
(France)	René Ehms	1950–1951
(France)	Noël Gallo	1953–1954
(Tunisia)	Habib Marzouk	1953–1955
(Tunisia)	Mohamed Najjar	1955–1957
(Tunisia)	Habib Fendri	1957–1958
(Tunisia)	Mongi Keskes	1958–1959
(Algeria)	Mokhtar Arribi	1959–1961
(Socialist Federal Republic of Yugoslavia)	Milan Kristić	1961–1966
(Socialist Federal Republic of Yugoslavia)	Branislav Acimović	1966–1968
(Socialist Federal Republic of Yugoslavia)	Gregors Georgevic	1971–1972
(Socialist Federal Republic of Yugoslavia)	Jivko Popadic	1972–1973
(Tunisia)	Ammar Nahali	1973–1974
(Socialist Federal Republic of Yugoslavia)	Radojica Radojičić	1974–1975
(Tunisia)	Habib Jerbi	1975–1976
(Socialist Federal Republic of Yugoslavia)	Milor Popov	1976–1978
(Socialist Federal Republic of Yugoslavia)	Radojica Radojičić	1978–1979
(Tunisia)	Mongi Dalhoum	1979–1980

Nat	Name	Period
(Germany)	Michael Pfeiffer	1980–1981
(Germany)	Peter Mucha; Manfred Steves	1981–1982
(Socialist Federal Republic of Yugoslavia)	Milor Popov	1982–1984
(Socialist Federal Republic of Yugoslavia)	Jean-Pierre Knayer	1984–1985
(Tunisia)	Ahmed Ouannes	1985–1986
(France) (Poland)	Hervé Revelli; Ryszard Kulesza	1986–1987
(Tunisia)	Mokhtar Tlili	1987–1988
(Socialist Federal Republic of Yugoslavia)	Gregors Georgevic	1988–1989
(Bulgaria)	Stefan Aladzhov	1989–1990
(Tunisia)	Mongi Dalhoum	1990–1992
(Tunisia)	Amor Dhib	1992–1993
(Brazil)	José Paolo Rubim	1993–1995
(Brazil) (Germany)	David Ferreiran; Werner Olke	1995–1996
(Brazil) (Tunisia) (Germany)	José Paolo Rubim; Faouzi Benzarti; Eckhard Krautzun	1996–1997
(Ukraine)	Yuriy Sevastyanenko	1997–1998
(Germany)	Eckhard Krautzun	1998–1999

Nat	Name	Period
(Brazil) (Tunisia)	José Dutra dos Santos; Khaled Ben Yahia	1999–2000
(Federal Republic of Yugoslavia)	Miodrag Ješić	2000–2001
(Tunisia)	Riadh Charfi	2001
(Federal Republic of Yugoslavia)	Silvester Takač	2001–2002
(France)	Manuel Amoros	2002
(Germany)	Otto Pfister	2002–2003
(Tunisia)	Mrad Mahjoub	2003–2004
(Switzerland)	Michel Decastel	2004–2006
(Tunisia)	Mrad Mahjoub	2006–2007
(Switzerland) (Tunisia)	Michel Decastel; Khaled Ben Yahia	2007–2008
(Tunisia)	Ghazi Ghrairi	2008–2009
(Algeria)	Azzedine Ait Djoudi	2009–2010
(Croatia)	Luka Peruzović	2009–2010
(France)	Pierre Lechantre	2010
(Tunisia)	Nabil Kouki	2010–2011
(Germany)	Reinhard Stumpf	2011–2012
(Tunisia)	Nabil Kouki	2012
(Netherlands)	Ruud Krol	2012–2013
(Tunisia)	Hammadi Daou	2013–2014
(France)	Philippe Troussier	2014
(Tunisia)	Ghazi Ghrairi	2014–2015
(Portugal)	Paulo Duarte	2015

Nat	Name	Period
(Tunisia)	Chiheb Ellili	2015–2016
(Argentina)	Néstor Clausen	2016–2017
(Portugal)	Jorge Costa	2017
(Portugal)	José Mota	2017
(Tunisia)	Lassaad Dridi	2017–2018
(Tunisia)	Ghazi Ghrairi	2018
(Netherlands)	Ruud Krol	2018–2019
(Montenegro)	Nebojša Jovović	2019
(Tunisia)	Fathi Al-Jabal	2019–2020
(Tunisia)	Faouzi Benzarti	2020
(Tunisia)	Anis Boujelbene	2020–2021
(Spain)	José Murcia	2021
(Tunisia)	Hammadi Daou	2021–2022
(Portugal)	Jorge Costa	2022
(Tunisia)	Nabil Kouki	2022
(Tunisia)	Karim Delhoum	2022
(Italy)	Maurizio Jacobacci	2022–2023
(Egypt)	Hossam El Badry	2023
(Tunisia)	Anis Jerbi	2023
(Tunisia)	Nabil Kouki	2023–2024
(Tunisia)	Karim Delhoum	2024
(Tunisia)	Mohamed Kouki	2024
(Portugal)	Alexandre Santos	2024–2025
(Tunisia)	Lassaad Dridi	2025
(Tunisia)	Mohamed Kouki	2025–2026

== Presidents ==
- 1912–31: (Tunisia) Zouhair Ayadi
- 1931–32: (Tunisia) Ali Cherif
- 1932–34: (Tunisia) Messaoud Ben Saad
- 1934–36: (Tunisia) Ahmed Bouslama
- 1936–38: (Tunisia) Abderrahmane Aloulou
- 1938–46: (Tunisia) Mohamed Elloumi
- 1946–48: (Tunisia) Habib Meziou
- 1948–50: (Tunisia) Abdelkader Jemal
- 1950–51: (Tunisia) Abdelaziz Hammami
- 1951–53: (Tunisia) Tahar Elleuch
- 1953–54: (Tunisia) Tahar Gargouri
- 1954–55: (Tunisia) Mohamed Halouani
- 1955–56: (Tunisia) Ahmed Akrout
- 1956–61: (Tunisia) Habib Larguech
- 1961–64: (Tunisia) Abdesselem Kallel
- 1964–65: (Tunisia) Mohamed Driss
- 1965–66: (Tunisia) Taoufik Zahaf
- 1966–67: (Tunisia) Hédi Bouricha
- 1967–70: (Tunisia) Taoufik Zahaf
- 1970–72: (Tunisia) Ahmed Fourati
- 1972–75: (Tunisia) Taoufik Zahaf
- 1975–76: (Tunisia) Mohamed Mezghanni
- 1976–78: (Tunisia) Taoufik Zahaf
- 1978–79: (Tunisia) Ismaïl Baklouti
- 1979–80: (Tunisia) Hédi Bouricha
- 1980–88: (Tunisia) Abdelaziz Ben Abdallah
- 1988–89: (Tunisia) Mohamed Aloulou
- 1989–90: (Tunisia) Taoufik Zahaf
- 1990–92: (Tunisia) Ismaïl Baklouti
- 1992–96: (Tunisia) Abdelaziz Ben Abdallah
- 1996–98: (Tunisia) Jamel Arem
- 1998–02: (Tunisia) Lotfi Abdennadher
- 2002–08: (Tunisia) Salaheddine Zahaf
- 2008–10: (Tunisia) Moncef Sellami
- 2010–11: (Tunisia) Naoufel Zahaf
- 2011–12: (Tunisia) Moncef Sellami
- 2012–16: (Tunisia) Lotfi Abdennadher
- 2016–22: (Tunisia) Moncef Khemakhem
- 2024–2025: (Tunisia) Abdelaziz Makhloufi
- 2025–present: (Tunisia) Mehdi Frikha

=== Provisional presidents ===
- 2022–2023: (Tunisia) Mohamed Trabelsi
- 2023–2024: (Tunisia) Jaouhar Laadhar

=== Fitness coaches ===
- 2023: (Tunisia) Anis Chaâlani

== Rival clubs ==
- (Tunisia) ES Tunis
- (Tunisia) Club Africain
- (Tunisia) Étoile Sportive du Sahel
- (Tunisia) US Monastir

== See also ==
- CS Sfaxien (volleyball)
- CS Sfaxien Women's Volleyball
- CS Sfaxien Women's Basketball
