= Victor Flores =

Victor Flores may refer to:

- Víctor Félix Flores Morales (born 1939), Mexican trade union leader and politician
- Víctor Flores Olea (1932–2020), Mexican academic, writer and diplomat
- Víctor Flores (athlete), Venezuelan runner, competed in Athletics at the 1963 Pan American Games
- Víctor Flores (basketball), Mexican basketball player, participated in 1984 Tournament of the Americas squads
- Víctor Flores (Peruvian politician), Peruvian politician, elected to the 2021–2026 Congress
- Víctor Flores (volleyball) (born 2001), Cuban volleyball player, participated in Cuba men's national under-21 volleyball team
- Víctor Flores (water polo), Spanish water-polo player, participated in 2015–16 División de Honor de Waterpolo
- Víctor Flores (wrestler), Ecuadorian wrestler
