= Wang Haibo =

Wang Haibo may refer to:

- Wang Haibo (basketball) (王海波), competed in the 1984 Summer Olympics
- Wang Haibo (swimmer) (汪海波), competed in the 2004 Summer Olympics
