= Abouzeid =

Abouzeid (Arabic: ليلة أبو) is an Arabic surname. Notable people with the surname include:

- Gaber Abouzeid (1954–2020), Egyptian volleyball player
- Leila Abouzeid (born 1950), Moroccan writer
- Taher Abouzeid (born 1962), Egyptian footballer
