= Peinado (surname) =

Peinado is a Spanish surname. Notable people with the surname include:

- Bruno Peinado (born 1970), French artist
- Carlos Peinado (born 1954), Uruguayan basketball player
- Daniel Peinado (born 1967), Argentine footballer
- Danilo Peinado (born 1985), Uruguayan footballer
- María Peinado (born 1977), Spanish athlete
- Robeilys Peinado (born 1997), Venezuelan pole vaulter
