= Ibrahima Diallo =

Ibrahima Diallo may refer to:

- Ibrahima Diallo (politician) (1915–1958), Senegalese politician
- Ibrahima Diallo (judoka) (born 1959), Senegalese judoka
- Ibrahima Diallo (footballer, born 1985), retired Guinean footballer
- Ibrahima Diallo (Paralympic footballer) (born 1993), English Paralympic footballer for Bitton A.F.C.
- Ibrahima Diallo (footballer, born 1999), French footballer
- Ibrahima Diallo (basketball) (born 1999), Senegalese basketball player
- Ibrahima Kandia Diallo (born 1941), Guinean footballer

== See also ==
- Ibrahim Diallo (disambiguation)
