= Shaun O'Leary =

New Zealand judoka

Personal information
- Nationality: New Zealand
- Born: 13 March 1958 (age 68) Ōtāhuhu, New Zealand

Sport
- Sport: Judo

Shaun O'Leary (born 13 March 1958) is a New Zealand judoka. He competed in the men's lightweight event at the 1984 Summer Olympics.
