= Gergely Tóth =

Gergely Tóth (born June 11, 1966, in Budapest, Hungary) is a theoretical chemist and university teacher of mathematical chemistry. He graduated from Eötvös Loránd University, Faculty of Science, Department of Theoretical Chemistry and obtained his PhD in 1993 from the same institution. From 1993–1995 he was a postdoctoral fellow at Max Planck Institute for Chemistry in Mainz, Germany. From 1995–1997 he obtained Zoltán Magyary postdoctoral fellowship and from 1997–1999 Hungarian Scientific Research Fund postdoctoral fellowship at Eötvös Loránd University. From 1999 he has a position at Institute of Chemistry, Eötvös Loránd University, Budapest. In 2015–2017 he served as the vice-director of the institute. He was a member of several local and national boards concerning chemistry education at secondary school and university levels. He is the head of the EchemTest Center in Budapest and Member of the Label Committee of the European Chemistry Network Association.

== Research experience ==
He is author or co-author of around 50 international publications. The topics cover field of chemistry which are related to computer simulations or mathematics, e.g. modelling of condensed matter, molecular dynamics and Monte Carlo simulations, Reverse Monte Carlo simulations, data evaluation, chemometrics and numerical methods.
