= Frank Evensen =

Norwegian judoka

Personal information
- Nationality: Norwegian
- Born: 24 July 1962 (age 62); Tønsberg, Norway

Sport
- Sport: Judo

Frank Evensen (born 24 July 1962) is a Norwegian judoka. He competed in the men's lightweight event at the 1984 Summer Olympics.
