= Ahn Byeong-keun =

South Korean judoka (born 1962)

Personal information
- Born: 23 February 1962 (age 64) Buk-gu, Daegu, South Korea
- Occupation: Judoka

Korean name
- Hangul: 안병근
- Hanja: 安柄根
- RR: An Byeonggeun
- MR: An Pyŏnggŭn

Sport
- Country: South Korea
- Sport: Judo
- Weight class: ‍–‍71 kg

Achievements and titles
- Olympic Games: (gold) (1984)
- World Champ.: (gold) (1985)
- Asian Champ.: (gold) (1986)
Medal record
Men's judo
Representing South Korea
Olympic Games
Gold medal – first place	1984 Los Angeles	‍–‍71 kg
World Championships
Gold medal – first place	1985 Seoul	‍–‍71 kg
Asian Games
Gold medal – first place	1986 Seoul	‍–‍71 kg

Profile at external databases
- IJF: 1930
- JudoInside.com: 6073
- Updated on 19 June 2023

Ahn Byeong-keun (born 23 February 1962 in Daegu) is a retired judoka from South Korea, who represented South Korea at the 1984 Summer Olympics. There he claimed the gold medal in the men's lightweight division (‍–‍71 kg) by defeating Italy's Ezio Gamba in the final. Ahn participated at the 1992 Summer Olympics as a coach.
