= Serge Dyot =

French judoka

Personal information
- Nationality: French
- Born: 21 January 1960 (age 65)

Sport
- Sport: Judo

Serge Dyot (born 21 January 1961) is a French judoka. He competed in the men's lightweight event at the 1984 Summer Olympics.
