= Kieran Foley =

Irish judoka

Personal information
- Nationality: Irish
- Born: 14 February 1958 (age 67) Kilkenny
- Occupation: Judoka

Sport
- Sport: Judo

Profile at external databases
- JudoInside.com: 10637

Kieran Foley (born 14 February 1958) is an Irish judoka. He competed in the men's lightweight event at the 1984 Summer Olympics and now is the head coach of Coolmine judo club.
