= Antti Hyvärinen (judoka) =

Finnish judoka (born 1960)

Personal information
- Nationality: Finnish
- Born: 26 November 1960 (age 64); Kangasala, Finland

Sport
- Sport: Judo

Antti Hyvärinen (born 26 November 1960) is a Finnish judoka. He competed in the men's lightweight event at the 1984 Summer Olympics.
