= Mohamed Kouki =

Tunisian football manager

Personal information
- Full name: Mohamed Kouki
- Date of birth: 21 April 1975 (age 51)
- Place of birth: Béja, Tunisia

Managerial career
- Years: Team
- 2008: AS Kasserine
- 2009–2010: EGS Gafsa
- 2012: Al-Ahly Shendi
- 2012–2013: Al-Merrikh SC
- 2013–2014: Olympique Béja
- 2014: AS Gabès
- 2015–2017: ES Métlaoui
- 2017–2018: Stade Tunisien
- 2018: Stade Gabèsien
- 2018–2019: Damac
- 2019: US Tataouine
- 2020: ES Métlaoui
- 2020–2021: Al-Tai
- 2021–2022: Olympique Béja
- 2022–2023: Al-Arabi
- 2023−2024: US Monastir
- 2024: CS Sfaxien
- 2024–2025: Al-Tai
- 2025–2026: CS Sfaxien

Mohamed Kouki (born 21 April 1975) is a Tunisian football manager.

== Honours ==
=== Manager ===
Damac

- Saudi First Division runners-up: 2018–19 (Promotion to Pro League)

Al-Tai

- Saudi First Division third place: 2020–21 (Promotion to Pro League)
