= Kerrith Brown =

British judoka

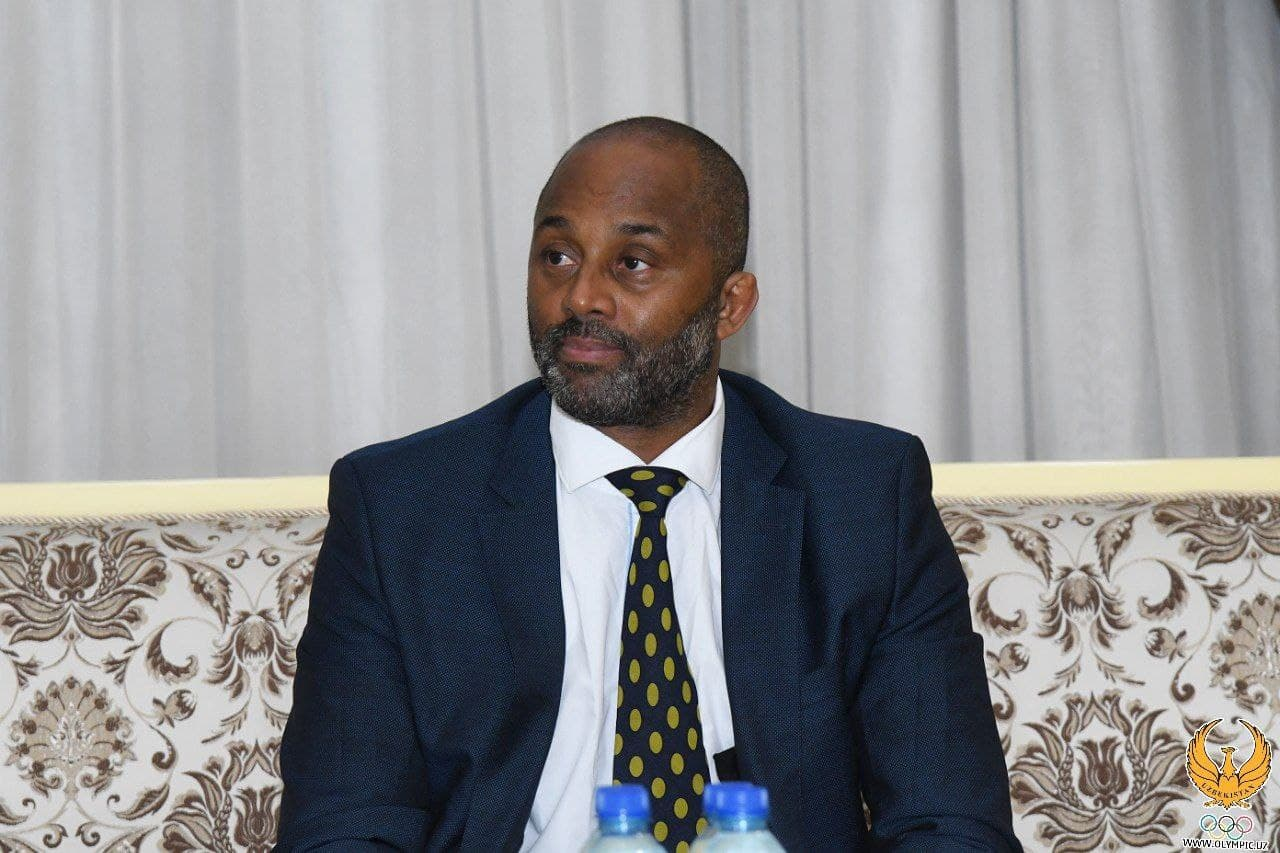

Personal information
- Nationality: British
- Born: 11 July 1962 (age 63)
- Occupation: Judoka

Sport
- Country: Great Britain
- Sport: Judo
- Weight class: –‍71 kg

Achievements and titles
- Olympic Games: (bronze) (1984)
- World Champ.: (bronze) (1987)
- European Champ.: (silver) (1986)
- Commonwealth Games: (gold) (1986)
Medal record
Men's judo
Representing Great Britain
Olympic Games
Bronze medal – third place	1984 Los Angeles	‍–‍71 kg
World Championships
Bronze medal – third place	1987 Essen	‍–‍71 kg
European Championships
Silver medal – second place	1986 Belgrade	‍–‍71 kg
Bronze medal – third place	1985 Hamar	‍–‍71 kg
European Junior Championships
Gold medal – first place	1981 San Marino	‍–‍65 kg
Representing England
Commonwealth Games
Gold medal – first place	1986 Edinburgh	‍–‍71 kg

Profile at external databases
- IJF: 11881
- JudoInside.com: 4909
- Updated on 19 June 2023

Kerrith Brown (born 11 July 1962) is a British judoka and President of the International Mixed Martial Arts Federation (IMMAF).

== Judo career ==
=== As an athlete ===
Brown was a six times champion of Great Britain, winning the British Judo Championships in 1979, 1980, 1982, 1983, 1987 and 1990, over three different weight categories.

He represented Great Britain at the 1984 Summer Olympics in Los Angeles, where he claimed the bronze medal in the men's lightweight division, alongside Brazil's Luis Onmura. In 1986, he won the gold medal in the 71 kg weight category at the judo demonstration sport event as part of the 1986 Commonwealth Games. At the 1988 Summer Olympics in Seoul, South Korea, he competed in the lightweight division again winning a bronze medal but after the competition he tested positive for use of a controlled substance (furosemide) and was disqualified and stripped of the medal.

=== Managerial ===
On 12 October 2012, Kerrith Brown was elected as the new Chairman of the British Judo Association by the British Judo membership, assuming the role at the BJA Annual General Meeting that took place on Saturday 10 November. Under his leadership, the British Judo Association opened its doors for its Centre of Excellence at the University of Wolverhampton in 2013. Also under his leadership, the British Judo Association's rights to the 2015 European Judo Championships were revoked by the European Judo Union and the event cancelled, eight weeks before it was scheduled to take place in Glasgow. The event cancellation was prompted by a disagreement over title sponsorship by mixed martial arts promoter, Ultimate Fighting Championship (UFC), in which the EJU cited the brand as not meeting "EJU values" . Kerrith Brown then resigned as Chairman of the British Judo Association "due to ideological differences with the leadership of the European Judo Union and the International Judo Federation and to ensure the best interests of British Judo"

== IMMAF ==
Brown was elected as president of the International Mixed Martial Arts Federation(IMMAF), following election by unanimous board vote in Berlin on 20 June 2015.
