= Tan Chin Kee =

Hong Kong judoka

Personal information
- Nationality: Hong Konger
- Born: 28 February 1952 (age 73)

Sport
- Sport: Judo

Tan Chin Kee (born 28 February 1952) is a Hong Kong judoka. He competed in the men's lightweight event at the 1984 Summer Olympics.
