= Vojislav Vujević =

Croatian judoka

Personal information
- Nationality: Croatian
- Born: 2 March 1955 (age 71) Osijek, Yugoslavia
- Occupation: Judoka

Sport
- Country: Yugoslavia
- Sport: Judo
- Weight class: –71 kg
- Rank: 8th dan black belt

Achievements and titles
- Olympic Games: R32 (1980, 1984)
- World Champ.: (bronze) (1981)
- European Champ.: 5th (1983)
Medal record
Men's judo
Representing Yugoslavia
World Championships
Bronze medal – third place	1981 Maastricht	–71 kg

Profile at external databases
- IJF: 54127
- JudoInside.com: 5551
- Updated on 10 March 2023

Vojislav Vujević (born 2 March 1955) is a Croatian judoka. He competed at the 1980 and the 1984 Summer Olympics, representing Yugoslavia.
