= Ibrahim Diallo =

Ibrahim Diallo may refer to:

- Ibrahim Diallo (footballer)
- Ibrahim Diallo (rugby union)

== See also ==
- Ibrahima Diallo (disambiguation)
