= Liaw Der-cheng =

Taiwanese judoka (born 1964)

Personal information
- Full name: 廖 德成, Pinyin: Liào Dé-chéng
- Nationality: Taiwanese
- Born: 17 September 1964 (age 60)

Sport
- Sport: Judo

Liaw Der-cheng (born 17 September 1964) is a Taiwanese judoka. He competed in the men's lightweight event at the 1984 Summer Olympics for the Chinese Taipei team.
