= Martino Di Serio =

Italian chemist

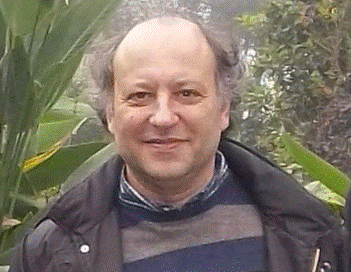
Martino Di Serio

Martino Di Serio is an Italian chemist.

== Academic background ==
In 1988, Di Serio graduated cum laude from the University of Naples Federico II in industrial chemistry. From then on until 1990, he worked in the research field with industrial grants at the Department of Chemistry of University of Naples Federico II. From 1990 to 1992, he was a temporary lecturer in industrial chemistry with the University of Salerno, where in 1993 he became a Researcher (Assistant Professor) in industrial chemistry. In 1995, he moved on to joining the Chemistry Department of the University of Naples Federico II, where from 2001 to June 2017 he was an associate professor of industrial chemistry. Since July 2017, he has been appointed full professor of industrial chemistry at the Department of Chemical Science of University of Naples Federico II.

== Scientific activities ==
He is the head of NICL (Naples Industrial Chemistry Laboratory) of the Department of Chemical Science of University of Naples Federico II. The research field of NICL is industrial chemistry and recently its main field of activity has been in biofuel production and the use of renewable resources as raw materials for chemical industry. The activity of NICL, notwithstanding the strong link with the themes of chemical industry, has had an important scientific impact. The results of these scientific activities have been published in a high number of papers, in a wide range of international journals, conference proceedings and patents.

From January 2019 to December 2021, he was the President of Division of Industrial Chemistry of SCI (Società Chimica Italiana),. From February 2015 to April 2021, he was vice-chair of Label Committee of Chemistry Quality Eurolabels. In 2025, in recognition of his activities and scientific results, the Industrial Chemistry Division of the Società Chimica Italiana (SCI) awarded him the “Medaglia Piero Pino” prize and the I&EC Research Journal (ACS Publications) published a special issue dedicated to him.
