= Ezio Gamba =

Italian judoka (born 1958)

Personal information
- Born: 2 December 1958 (age 67) Brescia, Italy
- Occupation: Judoka

Sport
- Country: Italy
- Sport: Judo
- Weight class: ‍–‍71 kg
- Club: C.S. Carabinieri

Achievements and titles
- Olympic Games: (gold) (1980)
- World Champ.: (silver) (1979, 1983)
- European Champ.: (gold) (1982)
Medal record
Men's judo
Representing Italy
Olympic Games
Gold medal – first place	1980 Moscow	‍–‍71 kg
Silver medal – second place	1984 Los Angeles	‍–‍71 kg
World Championships
Silver medal – second place	1979 Paris	‍–‍71 kg
Silver medal – second place	1983 Moscow	‍–‍71 kg
European Championships
Gold medal – first place	1982 Rostock	‍–‍71 kg
Silver medal – second place	1979 Brussels	‍–‍71 kg
Silver medal – second place	1983 Paris	‍–‍71 kg
Bronze medal – third place	1986 Belgrade	‍–‍71 kg
World Juniors Championships
Silver medal – second place	1976 Madrid	‍–‍70 kg
European Junior Championships
Silver medal – second place	1977 Berlin	‍–‍71 kg
Silver medal – second place	1978 Miskolc	‍–‍71 kg
European Cadet Championships
Silver medal – second place	1974 Tel Aviv	‍–‍65 kg

Profile at external databases
- IJF: 387
- JudoInside.com: 5324
- Updated on 19 June 2023

Ezio Gamba (born 2 December 1958) is a retired judoka from Italy, who represented his native country at four consecutive Olympic Games (1976, 1980, 1984 and 1988). Gamba claimed the gold medal in the men's lightweight division (‍–‍71 kg) in 1980 by defeating Great Britain's Neil Adams.

== Biography ==
Four years later in Los Angeles, California, Gamba won the silver medal in the same weight division, after being defeated by South Korea's Ahn Byeong-Keun in the final.

He is the current trainer of the Russian National Judo team. In 2013, for his great contribution to the development of sports in the Russian Federation Gamba was awarded the Russian Order of Friendship.

In early January 2016, he was granted Russian citizenship by President of Russia Vladimir Putin.

== International medals ==
Gold

- 82 European Championships (71 kg) - Rostock, Germany
- 80 Olympic Games (71 kg) - Moscow, Russia
- 80 Dutch Open (71 kg) – Den Haag, Holland*

Silver

- 88 European Championships (71 kg) - Paris, France, defeating G. Gevechanov from Bulgaria
- 84 Olympic Games (71 kg) - Los Angeles, CA, USA
- 83 World Championships (71 kg) - Moscow, Russia
- 83 European Championships (71 kg) - Paris, France
- 79 World Championships (71 kg) - Paris, France
- 79 European Championships (71 kg) - Brussels, Belgium
- 78 Jr. European Championships (71 kg) – Miskolc, Hungary
- 77 Jr. European Championships (71 kg) – Berlin, Germany
- 76 Jr. World Championships (78 kg) - Madrid, Spain

Bronze

- 86 European Championships (71 kg) – Belgrade, Yugoslavia
