= Yi Dexin =

Chinese judoka

Personal information
- Full name: Chinese: 伊 德新; pinyin: Yī Dé-xīn
- Nationality: Chinese
- Born: 3 December 1960 (age 64)

Sport
- Sport: Judo

Yi Dexin (born 3 December 1960) is a Chinese judoka. He competed in the men's lightweight event at the 1984 Summer Olympics.
