= Jiří Barek =

Czech researcher

Jiří Barek (born October 2, 1949, in Benešov, Czech Republic) is an electroanalytical chemist and university teacher of analytical chemistry. He graduated from Charles University, Faculty of Science, Department of Analytical Chemistry in 1972, and obtained his PhD in 1976 from the same institution. From 1977 to 1987 he served as a Lecturer, 1986–2006 as a Reader, and from 2006 he is a professor at the Department of Analytical Chemistry, Faculty of Science, Charles University, Prague. From 1993 to 1997, he served as the Deputy-Head and 2006–2012 as the Head of the Department of Analytical Chemistry, Charles University, Prague.

He is an active member of several institutions and boards:

- Associate Member of the Steering Committee of the Analytical Chemistry Division of the International Union of Pure and Applied Chemistry (IUPAC)
- Head of the UNESCO Laboratory of Environmental Electrochemistry at Charles University, Prague
- Head of the UNESCO Trace Element Satellite Centre at Charles University, Prague
- Member of editorial board of Chemické Listy (scientific journal of Czech Chemical Society), Analytical and Bioanalytical Chemistry (Springer Verlag), International Journal of Electrochemical Science, Chemical Sensors, Chemical Society of Pakistan Journal
- Member of the Working Group on the Destruction of Chemical Carcinogens of the International Agency for Research on Cancer
- Fellow of the Royal Society of Chemistry (Great Britain)
- Elected member of the Steering Committee of the Division of Analytical Chemistry of the European Association for Chemical and Molecular Science
- Member of the Main Committee of the Czech Chemical Society
- President of the Division of Analytical Chemistry of the Czech Chemical Society
- Member of the Label Committee of the European Chemistry Network Association
- Member of Scientific Council of Faculty of Chemical Technology, Prague Institute of Chemical Technology
- Member of Scientific Council of Faculty of Chemical Engineering, Prague Institute of Chemical Technology
- Member of the Committee of Ministry of Education of Slovak Republic for Defense of DrSc Thesis in the field of Analytical Chemistry, Radiochemistry and Environmental Chemistry
- Member of the Committee of the Czech Academy of Sciences for Defense of DSc Thesis in the Field of Analytical Chemistry
- Honored member of Serbian Chemical Society

== Publications ==
He is author and co-author of more than 400 publications in analytical chemistry in refereed journals, co-editor of 4 monographs on the destruction of chemical carcinogens, author and co-author of 16 chapters in monographs devoted mainly to electroanalytical methods, 3 university teaching texts. H-index of 35.

== Research ==
The main research interests are:

- Electrochemical determination of trace amounts of biologically active organic substances, e.g. environmental pollutants, chemical carcinogens, biomarkers, drugs and their metabolites, pesticides, dyes and dye-industry intermediates etc.
- High-performance liquid chromatography and flow injection analysis of the above-mentioned substances with electrochemical detection
- Development of new electrochemical sensors and detectors
