= Mohamed Sedki =

Egyptian footballer (born 1961)

Personal information
- Date of birth: 25 August 1961 (age 65)

International career
Years	Team	Apps	(Gls)
- Egypt

Mohamed Sedki (born 25 August 1961) is an Egyptian footballer. He competed in the men's tournament at the 1984 Summer Olympics.
