= Reiner Salzer =

German chemist (born 1942)

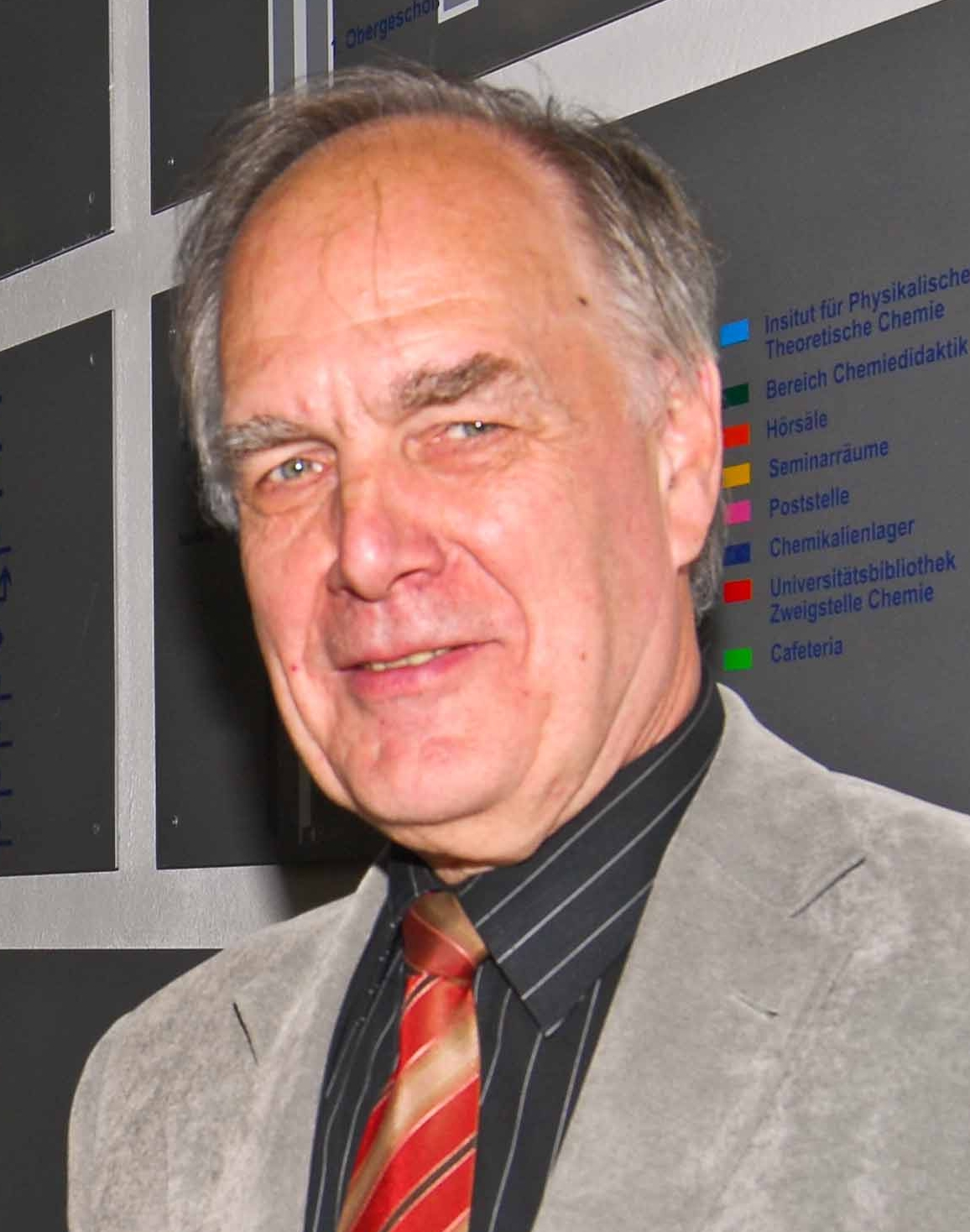
Reiner Salzer

Reiner Salzer (born 12 February 1942 in Aue (Sachsen)) is a German chemist (Analytical Chemistry) and university teacher of Analytical Chemistry at the TU Dresden.

Salzer studied chemistry from 1962 in Leipzig with a diploma in 1967. After his doctorate with Gerhard Geiseler 1971 on the intensity of infrared spectral bands he was a post-doc at the University of Ljubljana with Dušan Hadži (born 1921). Salzer habilitated in 1979 in Leipzig (Specific interactions and conformations in alkane derivatives). In 1990 he was appointed Full Professor of Analytical Chemistry at TU Dresden and Head of the Institute of Analytical Chemistry from 1991 – 2007.

Salzer employed various spectroscopic techniques (IR, Raman) for his investigations. His main research interests include molecular monitoring for early detection of diseases as well as analytical applications of biological active polymers such as artificial or natural ion channels.

1990/91 he was appointed Visiting Professor at the University of Oslo, later on he moved for research stays to Canada and to the USA. 2009 he was appointed Visiting Professor at the Gadjah Mada University of Yogyakarta, Indonesia.

Salzer is a member of the Norwegian Academy of Science in Oslo.

== Academic Offices and Positions (selection) ==
- 1990 – 1998 — Board Member of the German Working Group of Applied Spectroscopy (DASp)
- 1996 – 2003 — Vice-Chairman and Chairman of the Division Analytical Chemistry of the German Chemical Society (GDCh)
- since 1997 — German Delegate to the Division Analytical Chemistry (DAC) of the European Association for Chemical and Molecular Sciences (EuCheMS)
- 1997 – 2001 — Member of the GDCh Commission for Reforms in Chemistry Curricula
- 1999 – 2007 — Member in Evaluation Committees of the German Council of Science and Humanities
- 2000 – 2007 — Member of the Review Board Natural Sciences of the German Research Council (DFG)
- 2002 – 2009 — Member / Chairman of the Selection Committee of the Fresenius Prize of the GDCh
- 2002 – 2010 — Member of the "Bologna Commission" of the GDCh
- since 2003 — Head of the Study Group Education of DAC/EuCheMS
- since 2006 — Member/Vice-Chair/Chair of the ECTN Label Committee for the labels Chemistry Eurobachelor®, Chemistry Euromaster® and Chemistry Doctorate Eurolabel®
- since 2008 — Member / Head of the Jury of the Robert Kellner Lecture of DAC/EuCheMS
- since 2010 — Column Editor of "ABCs of Education and Professional Development in Analytical Science" of the journal Analytical and Bioanalytical Chemistry
- since 2010 — Series Editor of "Lecture Notes in Chemistry" of Springer

== Awards ==
- 2007 — Emich Plaque of the Austrian Society of Analytical Chemistry
- 2011 — Clemens Winkler Medal of the German Chemical Society
- 2012 — Hanuš Medal of the Czech Chemical Society
- 2013 — Ioannes Marcus Marci Medal of the Czech Spectroscopic Society Ioannes Marcus Marci
- 2015 — Tribute of the Division Analytical Chemistry of the European Association for Chemical and Molecular Sciences

== Publications (selection) ==
- Salzer, Reiner (2014). Infrared and Raman Spectroscopic Imaging. Weinheim: Wiley-VCH. ISBN 978-3-527-33652-4. OCLC 886116745.
- Burns, Duncan (2014). Important figures of analytical Chemistry from Germany in Brief biographies : from the Middle Ages to the Twentieth Century. Cham: Springer. ISBN 978-3-319-12150-5. OCLC 897115930.
- Salzer, Reiner (2012). Biomedical imaging : principles and applications. Hoboken, NJ: John Wiley & Sons. ISBN 978-0-470-64847-6. OCLC 794620155.
- Salzer, Reiner (1988). Progress in molecular spectroscopy : proceedings of the 15th Analytiktreffen. Leipzig: BSB B.G. Teubner Verlagsgesellschaft. ISBN 3-322-00702-2. OCLC 20472273.
