= Jorge Moré Rojas =

Cuban basketball player

Personal information
- Nationality: Cuban
- Born: 9 May 1958 (age 66)

Sport
- Sport: Basketball

Jorge Moré Rojas (born 9 May 1958) is a Cuban basketball player. He competed in the men's tournament at the 1980 Summer Olympics.
