= Emad El-Shafei =

Egyptian former swimmer (born 1966)

Personal information
- Born: 10 March 1966 (age 60)

Sport
- Sport: Swimming

Emad El-Shafei (born 10 March 1966) is an Egyptian former swimmer. He competed in three events at the 1984 Summer Olympics.
