= Ibrahima Diallo (judoka) =

Senegalese judoka (born 1959)

Personal information
- Nationality: Senegalese
- Born: 13 October 1959 (age 66)

Sport
- Sport: Judo

Ibrahima Diallo (born 13 October 1959) is a Senegalese judoka. He competed in the men's lightweight event at the 1984 Summer Olympics.
