= Yousry Zagloul =

Egyptian judoka

Personal information
- Nationality: Egyptian
- Born: 29 November 1954 (age 70)

Sport
- Sport: Judo

Yousry Zagloul (born 29 November 1954) is an Egyptian judoka. He competed in the men's lightweight event at the 1984 Summer Olympics.
