= Chehab =

Chehab may refer to:

- Fouad Chehab (1902–1973), Lebanese general and statesman, President of Lebanon from 1958 to 1964
- Khaled Chehab, Prime Minister of Lebanon 1938 and 1952 to 1953
- Chehab or Shehab (Dynasty), rulers of several parts of present-day Lebanon during the Ottoman Period
