= Ihab El-Lebedy =

Egyptian modern pentathlete

Ihab El-Lebedy OLY
Personal information
- Born: 8 September 1957 (age 68)

Sport
- Sport: Modern pentathlon

Ihab El-Lebedy (born 8 September 1957) is an Egyptian modern pentathlete. He competed at the 1984 Summer Olympics, finishing in 33rd place in the individual event.
