= Ahmed Nagui Salem =

Egyptian footballer (born 1953)

Personal information
- Date of birth: 1953 (age 72–73)
- Position: Goalkeeper

Senior career*
Years	Team	Apps	(Gls)
- Gazl Kafr El-Dawwar
- Al Ahly SC
- Tersana SC
- Suez Montakhab

International career
- Egypt
- * Club domestic league appearances and goals

Ahmed Nagui Salem (Arabic: أحمد ناجي سالم; born 1953) is an Egyptian footballer. He competed in the men's tournament at the 1984 Summer Olympics.
