= Hidetoshi Nakanishi =

Japanese judoka (1958–2026)

Nakanishi Hidetoshi
Personal information
- Native name: 中西 英敏
- Born: 3 July 1958 Umi, Fukuoka, Japan
- Died: 12 September 2026 (aged 68)
- Occupation: Judoka

Sport
- Sport: Judo
Medal record
Men's judo
Representing Japan
World Championships
Gold medal – first place	1983 Moscow	-71 kg

Profile at external databases
- JudoInside.com: 5440

Hidetoshi Nakanishi (中西 英敏, Nakanishi Hidetoshi; 3 July 1958 – 12 September 2026) was a Japanese judoka. He was a world champion in the lightweight category.

== Biography ==
Nakanishi was from Umi, Fukuoka. He began judo at the age of a 4th grader. After graduation from Tokai University, he belonged to International Budo University, Tokyo University and so on as a coach.

He won the gold medal of world championships in 1983 and participated in Olympic Games in 1984.

As of 2009, Nakanishi coached judo at his alma mater, Tokai University, where he previously studied as an undergraduate.

Nakanishi died on 12 September 2026, at the age of 68, after a battle with stomach cancer.
