= Samy Awad =

Egyptian modern pentathlete (born 1960)

Samy Awad OLY
Personal information
- Born: 7 September 1960 (age 65)

Sport
- Sport: Modern pentathlon

Samy Awad (born 7 September 1960) is an Egyptian modern pentathlete. He competed at the 1984 Summer Olympics, finishing in 36th place in the individual event.
