= Park Jong-chun =

South Korean basketball player

Personal information
- Nationality: South Korean
- Born: 13 May 1960 (age 65)

Sport
- Sport: Basketball

Korean name
- Hangul: 박종천
- Hanja: 朴鍾千
- RR: Bak Jongcheon
- MR: Pak Chongch'ŏn

Park Jong-chun (born 13 May 1960) is a South Korean basketball player. He competed in the men's tournament at the 1988 Summer Olympics.
