= Ahmed Said (swimmer) =

Egyptian swimmer

Personal information
- Born: 1 January 1962 (age 64)

Sport
- Sport: Swimming

Ahmed Said (born 1 January 1962) is an Egyptian swimmer. He competed in four events at the 1984 Summer Olympics.
