= Essam Awad =

Egyptian volleyball player (born 1962)

Essam Meawad
Personal information
- Nationality: Egyptian
- Born: 24 August 1962 (age 62)

Sport
- Sport: Volleyball

Essam Awad (born 24 August 1962) is an Egyptian volleyball player. He competed in the men's tournament at the 1984 Summer Olympics.
