= Ahmed Eid (swimmer) =

Egyptian swimmer

Personal information
- Full name: Ahmed Eid Ibrahim
- Born: 30 October 1960 (age 65)
- Height: 175 cm (5 ft 9 in)
- Weight: 75 kg (165 lb)

Sport
- Sport: Swimming
Medal record
Representing Egypt
African Games
Bronze medal – third place	1978 Algiers	200m butterfly

Ahmed Eid Ibrahim (أحمد عيد إبراهيم) (born 30 October 1960) is an Egyptian swimmer.

He won the bronze medal in the 200 metres butterfly at the 1978 All-Africa Games in Algiers. He competed in two events at the 1984 Summer Olympics.
