= Shaban Khalifa =

Egyptian volleyball player (1959–2022)

Personal information
- Full name: Shaban El-Tantawy Khalifa
- Nationality: Egyptian
- Born: 16 February 1959
- Died: March 2022 (aged 63)

Sport
- Sport: Volleyball

Shaban Khalifa (16 February 1959 – March 2022) was an Egyptian volleyball player. He competed in the men's tournament at the 1984 Summer Olympics.
