= Sharif Nour =

Egyptian swimmer

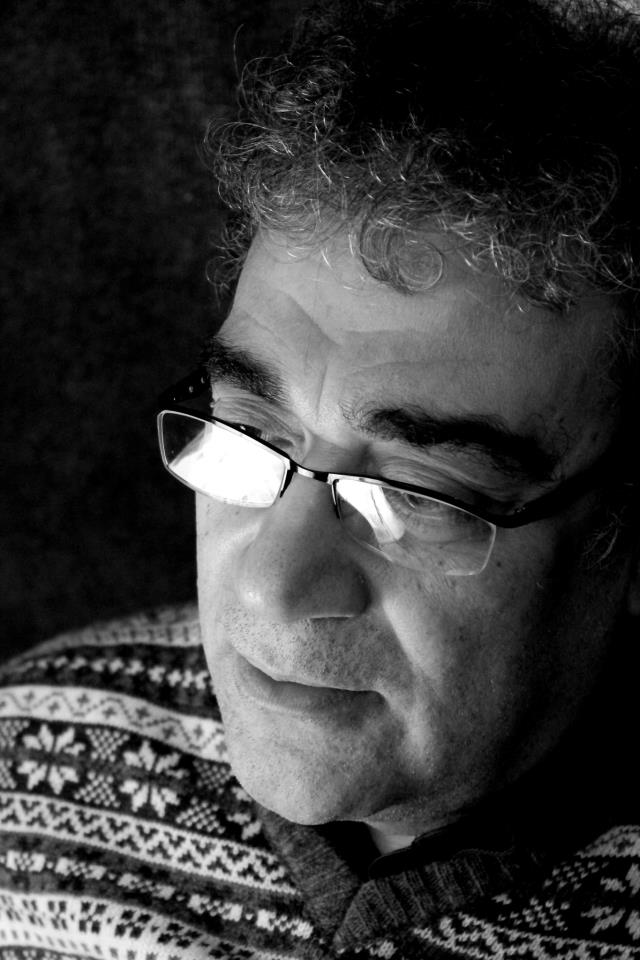

Personal information
- Born: 24 August 1963 (age 62)

Sport
- Sport: Swimming

Sharif Nour (born 24 August 1963) is an Egyptian former swimmer. He competed in three events at the 1984 Summer Olympics.
