= Hu Zhangbao =

Chinese basketball player (born 1963)

Hu Zhangbao (Chinese: 胡章保; born 5 April 1963 in Zhuji) is a Chinese former basketball player who competed in the 1984 Summer Olympics.
