= Mohamed Youssef (swimmer) =

Egyptian swimmer (born 1963)

Personal information
- Born: 7 January 1963 (age 63)

Sport
- Sport: Swimming
Medal record
Representing Egypt
African Games
Gold medal – first place	1987 Nairobi	50m freestyle
Gold medal – first place	1987 Nairobi	100m freestyle
Silver medal – second place	1991 Cairo	50m freestyle

Mohamed Youssef (born 7 January 1963) is an Egyptian former swimmer. He competed in five events at the 1984 Summer Olympics.
