= Ahmed Nasser (pentathlete) =

Egyptian modern pentathlete

Ahmed Nasser OLY
Personal information
- Born: 18 October 1953 (age 72)

Sport
- Sport: Modern pentathlon

Ahmed Nasser (born 18 October 1953) is an Egyptian modern pentathlete. He competed at the 1984 Summer Olympics, finishing in 39th place in the individual event.
