= Luiz Onmura =

Brazilian judoka (1960–2024)

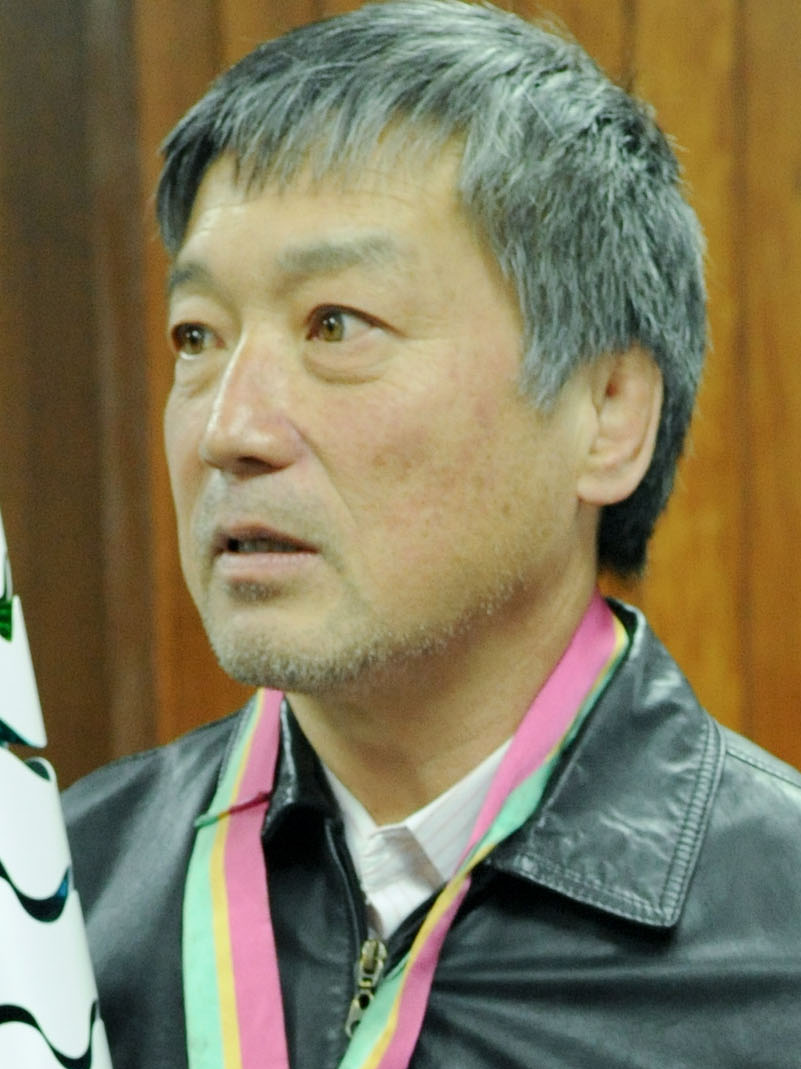
- Onmura in 2016

Personal information
- Full name: Luiz Yoshio Onmura
- Born: 29 June 1960 São Paulo, Brazil
- Died: 1 November 2024 (aged 64) Santos, São Paulo, Brazil
- Occupation: Judoka

Sport
- Country: Brazil
- Sport: Judo
- Weight class: ‍–‍65 kg, ‍–‍71 kg

Achievements and titles
- Olympic Games: (bronze) (1984)
- World Champ.: R16 (1979, 1987)
- Pan American Champ.: (1980, 1988)
Medal record
Men's judo
Representing Brazil
Olympic Games
| Bronze medal – third place | 1984 Los Angeles | ‍–‍71 kg |
Pan American Games
| Silver medal – second place | 1979 San Juan | ‍–‍65 kg |
| Silver medal – second place | 1983 Caracas | ‍–‍71 kg |
| Silver medal – second place | 1987 Indianapolis | ‍–‍71 kg |
Pan American Championships
| Gold medal – first place | 1980 Isla Margarita | ‍–‍65 kg |
| Gold medal – first place | 1988 Buenos Aires | ‍–‍71 kg |
| Bronze medal – third place | 1984 Mexico CIty | ‍–‍71 kg |

Profile at external databases
- IJF: 54120
- JudoInside.com: 711
- Updated on 19 June 2023

Luiz Yoshio Onmura (29 June 1960 – 1 November 2024) was a Brazilian judoka. He represented Brazil at the 1980, 1984 and the 1988 Summer Olympics. Onmura won a bronze medal in the men's lightweight division (‍–‍71 kg), alongside Great Britain's Kerrith Brown at the 1984 Games.

Onmura died from squamous-cell cancer of the tongue in Santos, on 1 November 2024, at the age of 64.
