= Vladimir Kadlec =

German basketball player (born 1957)

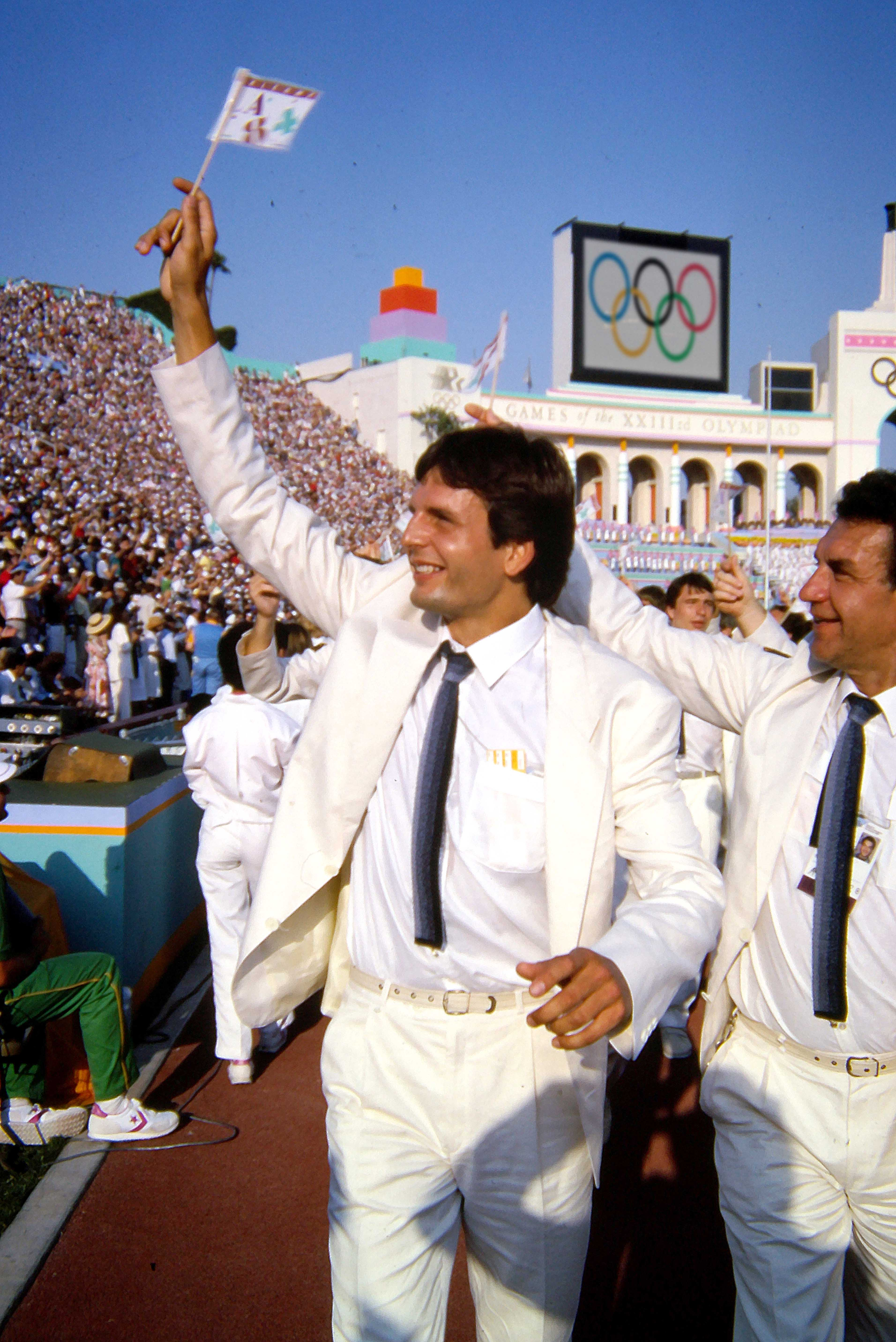

Personal information
- Nationality: German
- Born: 9 July 1957 (age 68); Prague, Czechoslovakia

Sport
- Sport: Basketball

Vladimir Kadlec (born 9 July 1957) is a former German basketball player. He competed in the men's tournament at the 1984 Summer Olympics.
