= Alick Kalwihzi =

Zambian judoka (born 1960)

Personal information
- Nationality: Zambian
- Born: 6 May 1960 (age 64)
- Weight: 71 kg (157 lb)

Sport
- Country: Zambia
- Sport: Judo

Alick Kalwihzi (born 6 May 1960) is a former Zambian male judoka. He represented Zambia at the 1984 Summer Olympics and competed in the men's lightweight event.
