= Federico Vizcarra =

Mexican judoka

Personal information
- Nationality: Mexican
- Born: 25 November 1964 (age 60)

Sport
- Sport: Judo

Federico Vizcarra (born 25 November 1964) is a Mexican judoka. He competed at the 1984 Summer Olympics and the 1988 Summer Olympics.
