= Ayman Nadim =

Egyptian swimmer

Personal information
- Born: 19 October 1963 (age 62)

Sport
- Sport: Swimming

Ayman Nadim (born 19 October 1963) is an Egyptian former swimmer. He competed in three events at the 1984 Summer Olympics.
