= Raúl Dubois =

Cuban basketball player

Personal information
- Nationality: Cuban
- Born: 2 January 1959 (age 66)

Sport
- Sport: Basketball

Raúl Dubois (born 2 January 1959) is a Cuban basketball player. He competed in the men's tournament at the 1980 Summer Olympics.
