= Wang Haibo (basketball) =

Chinese basketball player

Wang Haibo (Chinese: 王海波, born 23 September 1965) is a Chinese former basketball player who competed in the 1984 Summer Olympics. He is from Qingdao.
