= Ahmed El-Shamouty =

Egyptian volleyball player (born 1962)

Personal information
- Nationality: Egyptian
- Born: 7 March 1962 (age 63)

Sport
- Sport: Volleyball

Ahmed El-Shamouty (born 7 March 1962) is an Egyptian volleyball player. He competed in the men's tournament at the 1984 Summer Olympics.
