= Ji Zhaoguang =

Chinese basketball player (born 1956)

Ji Zhaoguang (born 5 December 1956) is a former Chinese basketball player who competed in the 1984 Summer Olympics.
