= Walid Boulahya =

Tunisian volleyball player (born 1964)

Personal information
- Full name: walid Boulahya
- Nationality: Tunisian
- Born: 12 March 1964 (age 61); Tunis

Sport
- Sport: Volleyball

Walid Boulahya (born 12 March 1964) is a Tunisian volleyball player. He competed in the men's tournament at the 1984 Summer Olympics.
