= Ahmed Abdel Aziz El-Askalani =

Egyptian volleyball player (born 1961)

Personal information
- Nationality: Egyptian
- Born: 2 September 1961 (age 63)

Sport
- Sport: Volleyball

Ahmed Abdel Aziz El-Askalani (born 2 September 1961) is an Egyptian volleyball player. He competed in the men's tournament at the 1984 Summer Olympics.
