= Lü Jinqing =

Chinese basketball player

Lv Jinqing 吕锦清
Personal information
- Born: 5 December 1962 (age 63) Guangzhou, Guangdong, China
- Listed height: 6.16 ft 0 in (1.88 m)

Career information
- Playing career: 1979–1997
Medals
Men's basketball
Representing China
FIBA Asia Cup
| Bronze medal – third place | 1985 Kuala Lumpur |

Lv Jinqing (born 5 December 1962) is a Chinese former basketball player who competed in the 1984 Summer Olympics.
