= Essameldin Abou El-Nein =

Egyptian basketball player

Essameldin Abou El-Enein
Personal information
- Nationality: Egyptian
- Born: 27 September 1958 (age 66)

Sport
- Sport: Basketball

Essameldin Abou El-Nein (born 27 September 1958) is an Egyptian basketball player. He competed in the men's tournament at the 1984 Summer Olympics.
