= Khaled Mohammed Bekhit =

Egyptian basketball player

Personal information
- Nationality: Egyptian
- Born: 15 November 1961 (age 63)

Sport
- Sport: Basketball

Khaled Mohammed Bekhit (born 15 November 1961) is an Egyptian basketball player. He competed in the men's tournament at the 1984 Summer Olympics.
