= Hisham Radwan =

Egyptian volleyball player (born 1955)

Personal information
- Nationality: Egyptian
- Born: 4 February 1955 (age 70)

Sport
- Sport: Volleyball

Hisham Radwan (born 4 February 1955) is an Egyptian volleyball player. He competed in the men's tournament at the 1984 Summer Olympics.
