= Mohamed Abdel Hamed =

Egyptian volleyball player (born 1959)

Personal information
- Nationality: Egyptian
- Born: 1 November 1959 (age 65)
- Height: 1.93 m (6 ft 4 in)
- Weight: 82 kg (181 lb)

Sport
- Sport: Volleyball

Mohamed Abdel Hamed (born 1 November 1959) is an Egyptian volleyball player. He competed in the 1984 Summer Olympics.
