= Mahmoud Abouelelaa =

Egyptian volleyball player (born 1954)

Personal information
- Nationality: Egyptian
- Born: 4 June 1954 (age 70)
- Height: 1.81 m (5 ft 11 in)
- Weight: 76 kg (168 lb)

Sport
- Sport: Volleyball

Mahmoud Abouelelaa (born 4 June 1954) is an Egyptian volleyball player. He competed in the 1984 Summer Olympics.
