= Abdel Hadi El-Gazzar =

Egyptian basketball player

Personal information
- Nationality: Egyptian
- Born: 16 July 1960 (age 64)

Sport
- Sport: Basketball

Abdel Hadi El-Gazzar (born 16 July 1960) is an Egyptian basketball player. He competed in the men's tournament at the 1984 Summer Olympics.
