= Khaled Abdel Rahman =

Egyptian volleyball player (1957–2015)

Personal information
- Nationality: Egyptian
- Born: 1 June 1957
- Died: 11 April 2015 (aged 57); Kuwait
- Height: 1.88 m (6 ft 2 in)
- Weight: 79 kg (174 lb)

Sport
- Sport: Volleyball

Khaled Abdel Rahman (1 June 1957 – 11 April 2015) was an Egyptian volleyball player. He competed in the 1984 Summer Olympics.
