= Abdel Hamid El-Wassimy =

Egyptian volleyball player (born 1956)

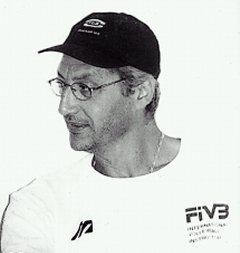

Personal information
- Nationality: Egyptian
- Born: 3 February 1956 (age 69)
- Died: May 2023

Sport
- Sport: Volleyball

Abdel Hamid El-Wassimy (born 3 February 1956; died in May 2023) was an Egyptian volleyball player, coach and executive. He competed in the men's tournament at the 1984 Summer Olympics.

After retirement he worked as a coach for many Egyptian clubs as well as the men‘s national team. He also coached the South Africa men’s volleyball team in the early 2000s. Later he was an FIVB Coaches Instructor. El-Wassimy also served as a Vice Chairman of the Egyptian Volleyball Federation.

He died in 2023.

== Links ==
- https://www.olympedia.org/athletes/52249
