= Abdel Kader Rabieh =

Egyptian basketball player

Personal information
- Nationality: Egyptian
- Born: 7 July 1958
- Died: 13 July 2010 (aged 52)

Sport
- Sport: Basketball

Abdel Kader Rabieh (7 July 1958 – 13 July 2010) was an Egyptian basketball player. He competed in the men's tournament at the 1984 Summer Olympics.
