= Mohamed Khaled =

Egyptian basketball player

Personal information
- Nationality: Egyptian
- Born: 26 April 1965 (age 60)

Sport
- Sport: Basketball

Mohamed Khaled (born 26 April 1965) is an Egyptian basketball player. He competed in the men's tournament at the 1984 Summer Olympics.
