= Hassan Ben Gamra =

Tunisian judoka (born 1959)

Personal information
- Nationality: Tunisian
- Born: 2 September 1959 (age 65)

Sport
- Sport: Judo

Hassan Ben Gamra (born 2 September 1959) is a Tunisian judoka. He competed in the men's lightweight event at the 1984 Summer Olympics.
