= Slim Mehrizi =

Tunisian volleyball player (born 1961)

Personal information
- Nationality: Tunisian
- Born: 18 January 1961
- Died: 21 February 2026 (aged 65)

Sport
- Sport: Volleyball

Slim Mehrizi (born 18 January 1961) was a Tunisian volleyball player. He competed in the men's tournament at the 1984 Summer Olympics. He died on 21 February 2026.
