= Razi Mhiri =

Tunisian volleyball player (born 1961)

Personal information
- Nationality: Tunisian
- Born: 9 April 1961 (age 63)

Sport
- Sport: Volleyball

Razi Mhiri (born 9 April 1961) is a Tunisian volleyball player. He competed in the men's tournament at the 1984 Summer Olympics.
