= Yassine Mezlini =

Tunisian volleyball player (born 1962)

Personal information
- Nationality: Tunisian
- Born: 4 November 1962 (age 62)

Sport
- Sport: Volleyball

Yassine Mezlini (born 4 November 1962) is a Tunisian volleyball player. He competed in the men's tournament at the 1984 Summer Olympics.
