= Liu Jianli =

Chinese basketball player

Liu Jianli (4 April 1956 – 18 February 2015) was a Chinese basketball player who competed in the 1984 Summer Olympics.
