= University of Chemistry and Technology, Prague =

University in Prague, Czech Republic

- Vysoká škola chemicko-technologická v Praze
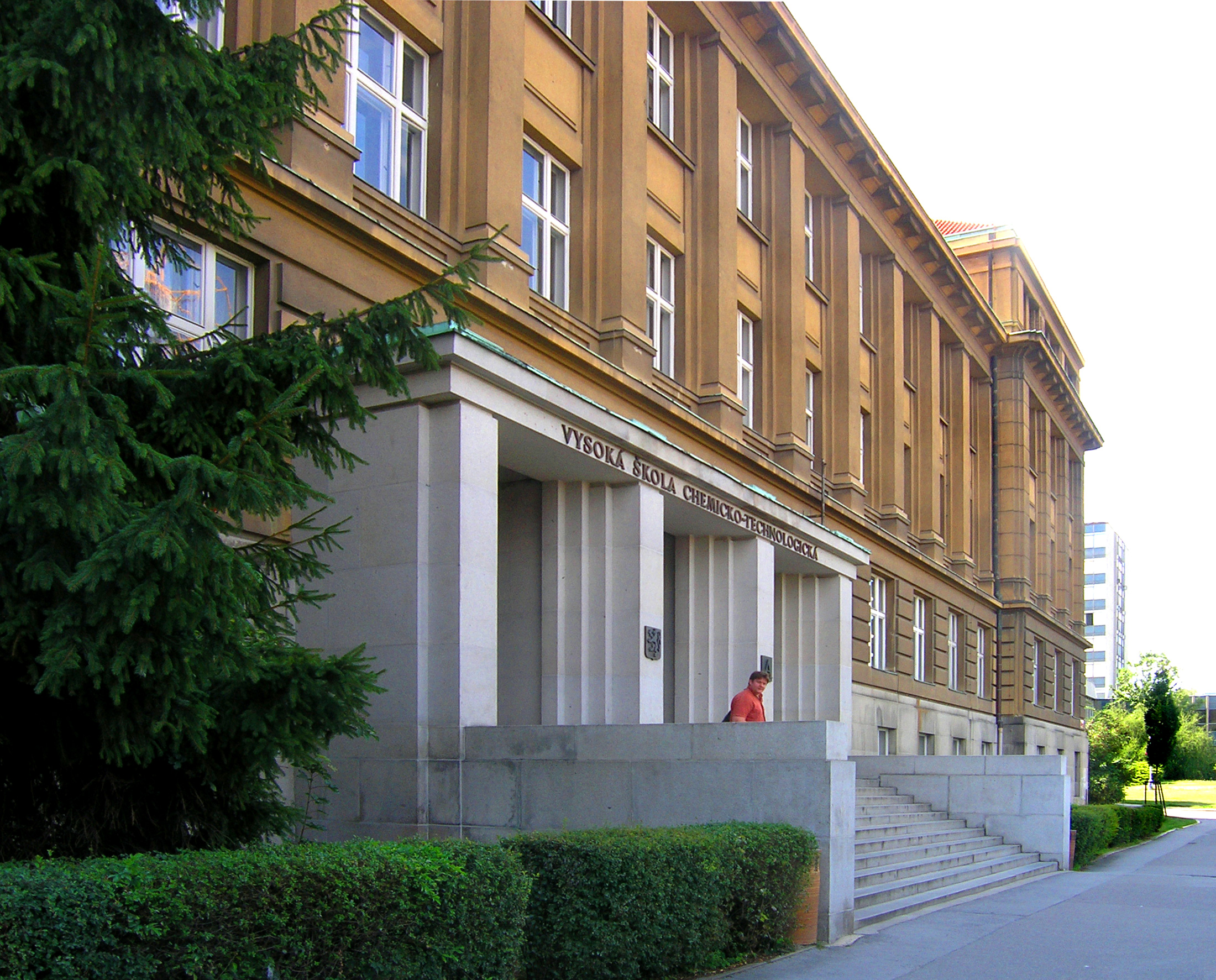
- Former names: University of Chemistry and Technology, Prague (UCT Prague)
- Type: Public
- Established: 1952
- Affiliations: EUA
- Rector: Milan Pospíšil
- Administrative staff: 871
- Students: 3,606
- Doctoral students: 843
- Location: Technická 5, 160 00, Praha 6-Dejvice, Prague, Czech Republic; 50°6′11.95″N 14°23′23.61″E
- Campus: Urban
- Website: www.vscht.cz?jazyk=en

University rankings

Global – Overall
- QS World: =638 (2026)

Regional – Overall
- QS Emerging Europe and Central Asia: 62 (2022)

The University of Chemistry and Technology, Prague (UCT Prague; Czech: Vysoká škola chemicko-technologická v Praze, VŠCHT Praha) is the largest university specializing in chemistry in the Czech Republic. Though founded in 1952, UCT Prague has origins dating back to the early nineteenth century and Prague Polytechnic, a precursor to the present-day Czech Technical University in Prague, and, since that time, it has been one of the leading chemistry research universities in Central Europe. More than 3,600 students are accepted every year. In 2014, UCT Prague had 510 academic staff and 361 research staff.

== Faculties ==
The university has four faculties.

=== Faculty of Chemical Technology ===
The Faculty of Chemical Technology was established in 1969 as a result of the merger between the Faculty of Inorganic Technology and the Faculty of Organic Technology. In 1952, these faculties, together with the Faculty of Food Technology, founded the independent Institute of Chemical Technology (now: UCT Prague).

=== Faculty of Environmental Technology ===
The Faculty of Environmental Technology was established in 1953, but activities in this area date back to the mid-1880s. In the 1980s, environmental technology became predominant in the faculty's activities, and in 1991, it acquired its current name.

=== Faculty of Food and Biochemical Technology ===
The teaching of food chemistry and technology has a long-standing tradition in the Czech lands, and is closely connected with the teaching of chemistry and chemical technology. The Faculty of Food and Biochemical Technology was established in 1952.

=== Faculty of Chemical Engineering ===
The Faculty of Chemical Engineering originated in the Prague School of Chemical-Technological Engineering founded in 1952 as part of the Czech Technical University. In 1960, the faculty was established in response to meet the needs of the chemical industry.

== History ==
=== Origins ===
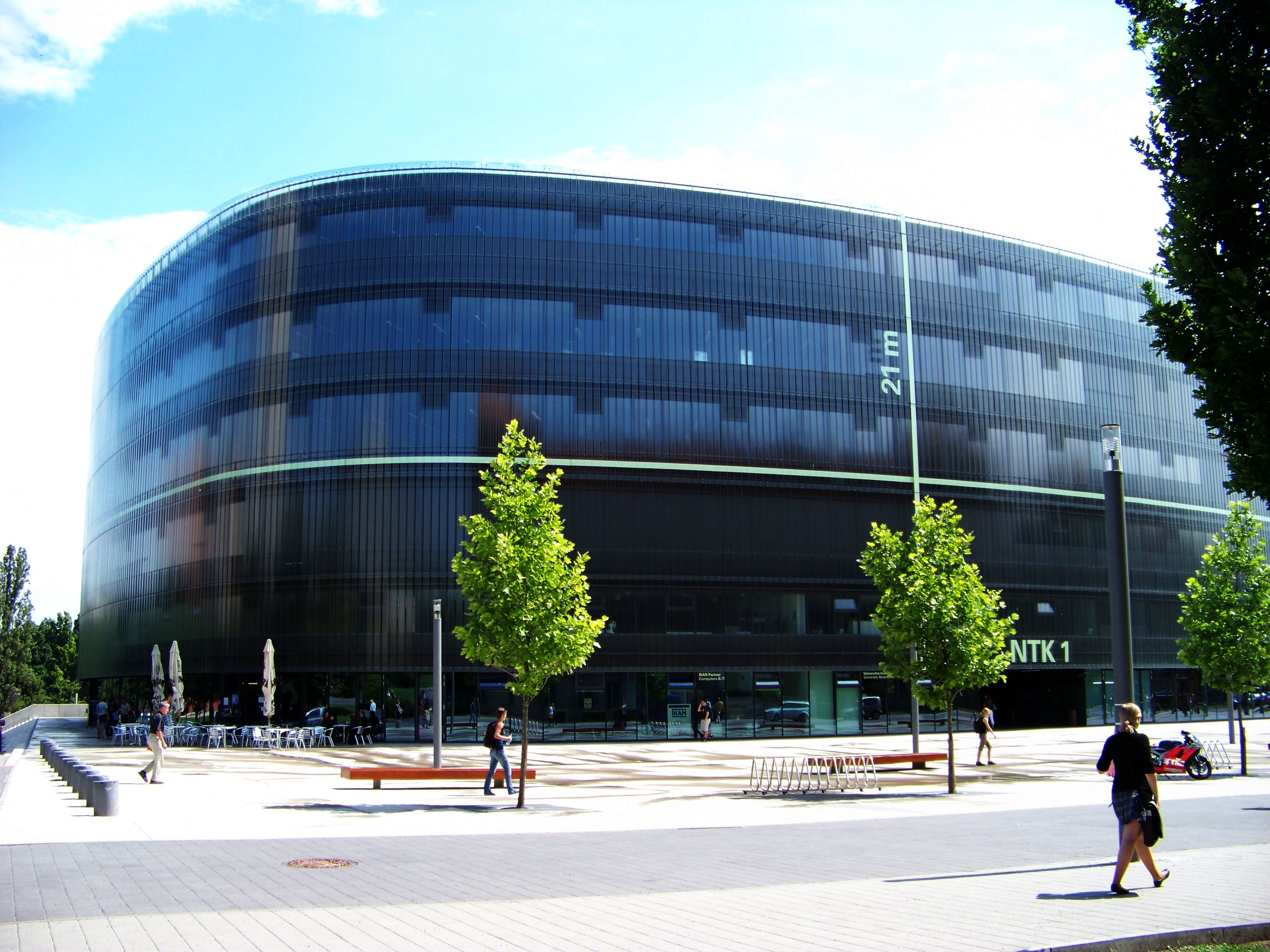
ChemTK at Czech National Library of Technology

The history of the university is rooted in the chemistry education in Bohemia from past centuries. Rapid industrial development during the eighteenth century, which is connected to many important technological and natural discoveries, resulted in the foundation of Prague Polytechnic on 10 November 1806, when the first courses in mathematics and chemistry were offered. In addition to general chemistry, practical chemistry instruction was also given, oriented towards working with glass, metallurgy and dyes. Later, brewing processes, sugar processes, analytics, analytics of minerals and technical gases, and other subject fields were added.

After the reorganization of Prague Polytechnic in 1920, the School of Chemical Technology was formed as one of seven sections of the Czech Technical University in Prague. The school's reputation at the end of nineteenth century was very high, and professor Emil Votoček (1872-1950) improved its excellent international reputation into the early twentieth century. The highest awards for university students and exceptional personalities in Czech chemistry carry his name.

=== Present university ===
The present university was formed in 1952 when it became independent of the Czech Technical University in Prague.
