= Juan Mignone =

Uruguayan basketball player (born 1961)

Juan Carlos Mignone Crisera (born 14 November 1961) is a Uruguayan former basketball player who competed in the 1984 Summer Olympics.
