= Gaber Abouzeid =

Egyptian volleyball player (1954–2020)

Personal information
- Full name: Gaber Abdelaty Abouzeid
- Nationality: Egyptian
- Born: 20 June 1954; Minya, Egypt
- Died: 15 August 2020 (aged 66)
- Height: 1.87 m (6 ft 2 in)
- Weight: 82 kg (181 lb)

Sport
- Sport: Volleyball
- Club: Zamalek SC

Gaber Abdelaty Abouzeid (20 June 1954 – 15 August 2020) was an Egyptian volleyball player. He competed in the 1976 and 1984 Summer Olympics.
