= Luis Larrosa =

Uruguayan basketball player (1958–2023)

Luis E. Larrosa Bustillo (31 March 1958 – 30 April 2023) was a Uruguayan basketball player who competed in the 1984 Summer Olympics. Larrosa died on 30 April 2023, at the age of 65.
