= Víctor Frattini =

Uruguayan basketball player (born 1956)

Víctor J. Frattini Bononi (born 19 February 1956) is a Uruguayan former basketball player who competed in the 1984 Summer Olympics.
