= Julio Pereyra =

Uruguayan basketball player (1963–2016)

Julio J. Pereyra Mele (3 January 1963 – 18 November 2016) was a Uruguayan former basketball player who competed in the 1984 Summer Olympics.
