= Abdel Aziz Ben Abdallah =

Tunisian volleyball player (born 1964)

Personal information
- Nationality: Tunisian
- Born: 11 March 1964 (age 61)

Sport
- Sport: Volleyball

Abdel Aziz Ben Abdallah (born 11 March 1964) is a Tunisian volleyball player. He competed at the 1984 Summer Olympics and the 1988 Summer Olympics.
