= Horacio Perdomo =

Uruguayan basketball player

Horacio R. "Gato" Perdomo Shaban (born 14 November 1960) is a Uruguayan former basketball player who competed in the 1984 Summer Olympics.
