= Hébert Núñez =

Uruguayan basketball player

Hébert J. Núñez González (born 7 June 1956) (death May, 2019) was a Uruguayan former basketball player who competed in the 1984 Summer Olympics.
