= Ehab Mohamed =

Egyptian volleyball player (born 1957)

Personal information
- Nationality: Egyptian
- Born: 4 April 1957 (age 67)

Sport
- Sport: Volleyball

Ehab Mohamed (born 4 April 1957) is an Egyptian volleyball player. He competed in the men's tournament at the 1984 Summer Olympics.
