= Mounir Barek =

Tunisian volleyball player (born 1960)

Personal information
- Nationality: Tunisian
- Born: 22 March 1960 (age 65)

Sport
- Sport: Volleyball

Mounir Barek (born 22 March 1960) is a Tunisian volleyball player. He competed in the men's tournament at the 1984 Summer Olympics.
