= Carlos Peinado =

Uruguayan basketball player

Carlos J. Peinado Stagnero (born 23 December 1954) is a retired Uruguayan professional basketball player. He represented Uruguay at the 1984 Summer Olympics in Los Angeles, California, where the Uruguay national basketball team ended up in sixth place in the final rankings. Peinado was the oldest member (29 years, 219 days) of the Uruguayan Olympic Squad, and was the flag bearer at the opening ceremony.
