= Jung (Korean surname) =

- Hangul: 정
- Hanja: 鄭; 丁; 程
- RR: Jeong
- MR: Chŏng

Percentage of family names in South Korea. Kim, Gim, Ghim Lee, Yi, Rhee, Yie Park, Bark, Pak, Bhak Choi, Choe Jung, Jeong, Chung, Cheong

Jung (Korean: 정) is a Latin alphabet rendition of the Korean family name "정", also often spelled Jeong, Chung, Joung or Jong. As of the South Korean census of 2015, there were 2,407,601 people by this name in South Korea or 4.84% of the population. The Korean family name is mainly derived from three homophonous hanja. 鄭 (2,151,879), 丁 (243,803) and 程 (11,683). The rest of the homophonous hanjas include: 政 (139), 桯 (41), 定 (29), 正 (22) and 情 (5).

== Latin-alphabet spelling ==
In a study by the National Institute of the Korean Language based on a sample of year 2007 applications for South Korean passports, it was found that 48.6% of people with this surname chose to have it spelled in Latin letters as Jung in their passports. The Revised Romanization transcription Jeong was at second place with 37.0%, while Chung came in third at 9.2%. It was the only one out of the top five surnames (the others being Kim, Park, Lee, and Choi) for which the Revised Romanization spelling was used by more than a few percent of applicants.

Rarer alternative spellings (the remaining 5.2%) included, in order of decreasing frequency, Joung, Cheong, Chong, Jeoung, Jeung, Choung, Jong, Cheung, Juong, Jeng, Chyung, Jaung, Jueng, and Zheng. The spelling Jong, rare in South Korea, is official in North Korea's modified version of the McCune–Reischauer transcription system.

== Lineages ==
The Korean family name Jung can be written with any of three homophonous hanja. Each of those three are broken down into a number of clans, identified by their bon-gwan (clan hometown, not necessarily the actual residence of the clan members), which indicate different lineages.

=== Most common (鄭) ===
鄭 (나라 정 nara jeong) is the most common of the three Jung names. According to Samguk sagi, this character was given to Jibaekho (지백호) who was the chief of one chiefdom among six chiefdoms as surname by the King Yuri in early Silla era. Historically, 鄭 was officially written as Tyeng (뎡) In the 2015 South Korean census, 2,010,117 people (4.16%) and 626,265 households had this family name. These people identified with 136 different bon-gwan (not including those listed as "other" or "unreported" in the census). Some examples of these clans are Dongnae, Gyeongju, Jinju, Yeonil, Hadong, Naju, Chogye, Cheongju and Haeju.

=== Second-most common (丁) ===
丁 (고무래 정 gomurae jeong; 장정 정 jangjeong jeong) is the second-most common of the three Jung names. In the 2015 census, 187,975 people (0.47%) and 58,431 households had this family name. These people identified with 23 different bon-gwan, including:

1. Naju: 82,863 people and 25,786 households.
2. Jinju: 24,598 people and 7,661 households.
3. Yeonggwang: 21,774 people and 6,839 households.
4. Changwon: 16,141 people and 4,989 households.
5. Yeongseong: 10,429 people and 3,279 households.
6. Gukseong: 9,620 people and 2,984 households.
7. Haeju: 5,381 people and 1,683 households.
8. Aphae (押海): 3,335 people and 1,079 households. They claim descent from Chŏng Tŏksŏng (정덕성; 丁德盛; Pinyin: Dīng Déshèng), who was born in a village called Dingying (丁營) in Dengzhou, China and came to the Korean peninsula during the reign of Munjong of Goryeo. Later on, some other Jung clans branched off from them, and became more numerous.
9. Other or unreported: 13,834 people and 4,131 households.

=== Least common (程) ===
程 (한도 정 hando jeong; 길 정 gil jeong) is the least-common of the three Jung names. In the 2015 census, 32,519 people and 10,220 households had this family name. These people identified with 15 different bon-gwan, including:

1. Dongnae: 10,632 people and 3,321 households.
2. Gyeongju: 9,026 people and 2,934 households.
3. Hanam: 7,766 people and 2,355 households.
4. Other or unreported: 5,095 people and 1,610 households.

== Notable people of the past ==
The following is a list of notable people of the past with the Korean family name Jung.

- Chŏng Sŏng (fl. 11th century), Goryeo Dynasty soldier
- Chŏng Chung-bu (1106–1179), Goryeo Dynasty soldier and military dictator
- Chŏng Mong-ju (1337–1392), Goryeo Dynasty minister and writer
- Chŏng Tojŏn (1342–1398), Joseon Dynasty politician
- Chŏng Inji (1396–1478), Joseon Dynasty Neo-Confucian scholar
- Chŏng Hyŏnjo (1440–1504), Joseon Dynasty politician and writer
- Hadong Budaebuin (1522–1567), Joseon Dynasty Grand Internal Princess Consort
- Jeong Nan-jeong (1525–1565), Joseon Dynasty philosopher
- Chŏng Inhong (1535–1623), Joseon Dynasty Neo-Confucian scholar and writer
- Chŏng Ch'ŏl (1536–1593), Joseon Dynasty statesman and poet
- Chŏng Ku (1543–1620), Joseon Dynasty philosopher, politician, historian and writer
- Chŏng Yŏrip (1546–1589), Joseon Dynasty politician
- Chŏng Pal (1553–1592), Joseon Dynasty naval captain
- Jeong Ki-ryong (1562–1622), Joseon Dynasty general
- Chŏng Munbu (1565–1624), Joseon Dynasty statesman
- Jeong Rip (1574–1629), Joseon Dynasty scholar-official, diplomat, and ambassador
- Jeong Seon (1676–1759), Joseon Dynasty landscape painter
- Jeong Ji-hae (fl. 1748), Joseon Dynasty archaeologist
- Chŏng Yagyong (1762–1836), Joseon Dynasty Silhak philosopher
- Chŏng Yakjong (1760–1801), also Augustine Chong, Roman Catholic Korean bishop and martyr
- Paul Chong Hasang (1794 or 1795–1839), Roman Catholic Korean saint

== Notable people of recent times ==
The following is a list of notable people in recent history with the Korean family name Jung or any of its variants. Individuals are grouped by area of notability and then ordered by year of birth. Names are presented in the form they are given on the respective articles, which may have the family name first or last, or which may be a stage name or pen name. For the selection rules, see the previous section.

=== Business ===
- Chung Ju-yung (1915–2001), South Korean businessman
- Chung Mong-koo (born 1938), South Korean businessman
- Chung Joon-yang (born 1948), South Korean businessman
- Chung Mong-hun (1948–2003), South Korean businessman
- Chung Mong-joon (born 1951), South Korean businessman and politician
- Chung Mong-won (born 1955), South Korean businessman
- Chung Mong-gyu (born 1961), South Korean businessman
- Saeju Jeong (born 1981), South Korean entrepreneur
- Chung Yong-jin (born 1968), South Korean businessman
- Chung Eui-sun (born 1970), South Korean businessman

=== Classical music and dance ===
- Myung-wha Chung (born 1944), South Korean cellist and university professor
- Kyung Wha Chung (born 1948), South Korean violinist
- Soon-Mi Chung (born 1952), South Korean-born Norwegian musician and musical director
- Myung-whun Chung (born 1953), South Korean pianist and conductor
- Young-jae Jung (born 1984), South Korean ballet dancer

=== Design and visual arts ===
- Chung Sanghwa (born 1932), South Korean minimalist and Dansaekhwa painter
- Chung Yangmo (born 1934), South Korean art historian
- Peter Chung (born Jeong Geun-sik, 1961), Korean American animator
- Doo-Ri Chung (born 1971), Korean American fashion designer
- Mimi Jung (born 1981), South Korean artist
- Young Yang Chung, South Korean textile historian and embroiderer

=== Entertainment industry ===
==== Screen actors ====
- Jung Ae-ri (born 1960), South Korean actress
- Jung Bo-min (born 1997), South Korean actress
- Jeong Bo-seok (born 1961), South Korean actor
- Jung Chan (born 1971), South Korean actor
- Charlet Chung (born 1983), American actress
- Jeong Da-bin (1980–2007), South Korean actress
- Jung Da-bin (actress, born 2000), South Korean actress
- Jung Dong-hwan (born 1949), South Korean actor
- Jung Eui-chul (born 1985), South Korean actor and model
- Jung Eui-jae (born 1990), South Korean actor, singer, model
- Jung Eun-pyo (born 1966), South Korean actor
- Jung Eun-chae (born 1986), South Korean actress, model, and TV host
- Min Hyo-rin (born Jung Eun-ran, 1986), South Korean actress, model and singer
- Jung Eun-woo (1986–2026), South Korean actor
- Jeong Ga-eun (born Baek Ra-hee, 1978), South Korean actress
- Jung Ga-ram (born 1993), South Korean actor
- Jung Gun-joo (born 1995), South Korean actor
- Jung Gyu-woon (born 1982), South Korean actor
- Jeong Ha-dam (born 1994), South Korean actress
- Jung Hae-in (born 1988), South Korean actor
- Jung Hae-kyun (born 1968), South Korean actor
- Jung Han-yong (born 1954), South Korean actor
- Jung Hee-tae (born 1974), South Korean actor
- Jung Ho-keun (born 1964), South Korean actor
- Hoyeon Jung (born 1994), South Korean fashion model and actress
- Jung Hye-in (born 1990), South Korean actress
- Jung Hye-sun (born 1942), South Korean actress
- Jung Hye-sung (born 1991), South Korean actress
- Jung Hye-young (born 1973), South Korean actress
- Jung Hyeon-jun (born 2011), South Korean actor
- Jung Il-woo (born 1987), South Korean actor
- Jung In-gi (born 1966), South Korean actor
- Jung In-seo (born 2000), South Korean actress
- Jung In-sun (born 1991), South Korean actress
- Jung Jae-eun (actress) (born 1969), South Korean actress
- Jung Jae-kwang (born 1990), South Korean actor
- Jung Jae-young (born 1970), South Korean actor
- Jamie Chung (born 1983), American actress and television personality
- Jung Jin-young (actor) (born 1964), South Korean actor
- Jung Joon (born 1979), South Korean actor
- Jung Joon-ho (born 1970), South Korean actor
- Jung Joon-won (actor, born 1988), South Korean actor
- Jung Joon-won (actor, born 2004), South Korean actor
- Ken Jeong (born 1969), American comedian, actor, and physician
- Jung Kyung-ho (actor, born 1972), South Korean actor
- Jung Kyung-ho (actor, born 1983), South Korean actor
- Jung Man-sik (born 1974), South Korean actor
- Jung Min-ah (born 1994), South Korean actress
- Jung Min-joon (born 2016), South Korean actor
- Jung Moon-sung (born 1981), South Korean actor
- Jung Ryeo-won (born 1981), Korean-Australian actress and singer
- Jung Sang-hoon (born 1976), South Korean actor
- Jung So-min (born Kim Yoon-ji, 1989), South Korean actress
- Jeong Soon-won (born 1987), South Korean actor
- Sora Jung (born Kim Seo-ra, 1968), South Korean actress
- Chung Su-bin (born 1998), South Korean actress
- Jung Sung-hwa (born 1975), South Korean actor
- Jung Sung-il (actor) (born 1980), South Korean actor
- Jung Suk-won (born 1985), South Korean actor
- Jung Tae-woo (born 1982), South Korean actor
- Jung Woo-sung (born 1973), South Korean actor
- Jung Woon-sun (born 1983), South Korean actress
- Jung Woong-in (born 1971), South Korean actor
- Jung Yeon-joo (born 1990), South Korean actress and model
- Jung Yi-seo (born 1993), South Korean actress
- Jung Yoo-jin (born 1989), South Korean model and actress
- Jung Yoo-min (born 1991), South Korean actress
- Jung Yoon-seok (born 2003), South Korean actor
- Jung Yu-mi (actress, born 1983), South Korean actress
- Jeong Yu-mi (actress, born 1984), South Korean actress
- Jeong Yun-hui (born 1954), South Korean former actress

==== Voice actors ====
- Chung Misook (born 1962), South Korean voice actress
- Jeong Nam (born 1968), South Korean voice actress
- Jeong Jae-heon (born 1975), South Korean voice actor
- Jeong Yeong-wung (born 1979), South Korean voice actor

==== Film directors, producers and screenwriters ====
- Jung Jin-woo (1938–2026), South Korean film director and producer
- Chung Ji-young (born 1946), South Korean film director and screenwriter
- Jung Sung-il (director) (born 1959), South Korean film critic, director and screenwriter
- Jeong Yoon-soo (born 1962), South Korean film director
- Jung Seung-hye (1965–2009), South Korean film producer
- Jung Doo-hong (born 1966), South Korean action director, martial arts choreographer and stunt coordinator
- Jeong Yeon-shik (born 1967), South Korean film director, screenwriter and webtoonist
- Jung Ji-woo (born 1968), South Korean film director
- Jung Yoo-kyung (born 1968), South Korean television screenwriter
- Jeong Jae-eun (born 1969), South Korean film director
- Jeong Yong-ki (born 1970), South Korean film director and scriptwriter
- Jeong Yoon-cheol (born 1971), South Korean film director
- Jeong Yoon-soo (born 1971), South Korean film director and scriptwriter
- Jeong Seo-kyeong (born 1975), South Korean screenwriter
- Lee Isaac Chung (born 1978), American film director and screenwriter

==== Singers ====
- Joo (singer) (born Jung A-rin, 1990), South Korean singer-songwriter and musical actress
- G.O (singer) (born Jung Byung-hee, 1987), South Korean singer-songwriter and actor, member of boy band MBLAQ
- Jung Chae-yeon (born 1997), South Korean singer and actress, member of girl group DIA
- Jung Chan-woo (singer) (born 1998), South Korean singer and actor, member of boy band iKON
- Clara Chung (born 1987), American singer-songwriter, producer and composer
- Jung Dae-hyun (born 1993), South Korean singer and actor
- Jung Dong-ha (born 1980), South Korean singer, entertainer, and vocal major professor
- Jeong Dong-won (born 2007), South Korean trot singer and actor
- Jung Eun-bi (stage name Eunha, born 1997), South Korean singer and actress, member of girl group Viviz
- Jung Eun-ji (born 1993), South Korean singer-songwriter and actress, member of girl group Apink
- Jung Ha-na (born 1990), former South Korean singer and actress
- Jung Han-hae (born 1990), South Korean rapper and singer
- Heyoon Jeong (born 1996), South Korean singer, dancer, rapper and choreographer, member of global pop group Now United
- Jung Hoseok (stage name J-Hope, born 1994), South Korean rapper, dancer, singer-songwriter and record producer, member of boy band BTS
- Seo Taiji (born Jeong Hyeon-cheol, 1972), South Korean singer-songwriter, musician and record producer
- Jung Il-hoon (born 1994), South Korean rapper, songwriter, record producer and actor
- Jeong Jae-hyun (born 1997), South Korean singer, member of boy band NCT
- Jung Jae-hyung (born 1970), South Korean singer-songwriter, pianist and film composer
- Jung Jae-won (stage name One, born 1994), South Korean rapper, singer-songwriter and actor
- J (South Korean singer) (born Chung Jae-young, 1977), Korean-American singer
- Jessica Jung (born 1989), Korean-American singer-songwriter, actress, author and businesswoman
- Jung Ji-hoon (stage name Rain, born 1982), South Korean singer-songwriter, dancer, actor and record producer
- Jeong Jin-hwan (born 1993), South Korean singer, rapper, actor
- Jeong Jin-woon (born 1991), South Korean singer and actor, member of boy band 2AM
- Jung Jin-young (singer) (born 1991), South Korean singer-songwriter, record producer and actor
- Simon Dominic (born Jung Ki-suck, 1984), South Korean rapper
- Koo Chung, Korean-American Christian singer-songwriter
- Krystal Jung (born 1994), Korean-American singer and actress, member of girl group f(x)
- Nicole Jung (born 1991), South Korean-American singer and actress
- Shin Hye-sung (born Jung Pil-kyo, 1979), South Korean singer-songwriter, member of boy band Shinhwa
- San E (born Jung San, 1985), South Korean rapper
- Jeong Sae-bi (born 2008), South Korean singer, member of girl group Izna
- Jeong Se-woon (born 1997), South Korean singer-songwriter
- Jeong So-yeon (born 1994), South Korean singer, member of girl group Laboum
- Sungchan (born Jung Sung-chan, 2001), South Korean singer, member of boy band RIIZE
- Jung Taek-woon (stage name Leo, born 1990), South Korean singer-songwriter and musical theatre actor, member of boy band VIXX
- Jung Whee-in (born 1995), South Korean singer, member of girl group Mamamoo
- Wooseok (born Jung Woo-seok, 1998), South Korean rapper and singer-songwriter, member of boy band Pentagon
- Jung Ye-rin (born 1996), South Korean singer and actress
- Jung Yong-hwa (born 1989), South Korean singer, musician, and actor, member of rock band CNBLUE
- Jung Yoon-hak (born 1984), South Korean singer, actor and model, member of boy band Supernova
- Jung Yu-ri (born 1984), South Korean singer
- Jung Yun-ho (born 1986), South Korean singer-songwriter and actor, member of pop duo TVXQ
- Jeong Yun-ho (born 1999), South Korean singer, dancer and actor, member of boy band Ateez
- Jung Wooyoung (born 1999), South Korean singer and dancer, member of boy band Ateez
- Yoonchae (born Jeung Yoon-chae, 2007), South Korean singer, dancer and member of American girl group Katseye
- Jeong Lee-an (born 2009), stage name Ian South Korean singer, member of girl group Hearts2Hearts

==== Other entertainers ====
- Jeong Jun-ha (born 1971), South Korean comedian and entertainer
- Jae Chong (born 1972), Korean American music producer
- Jung Hyung-don (born 1978), South Korean comedian and television host
- Wonho Chung (born 1980), South Korean comedian and television personality
- Fantasy (gamer) (born Jung Myung-hoon, 1991), South Korean professional League of Legends player
- Jung So-ra (born 1991), South Korean beauty pageant titleholder
- Chyung Eun-ju (born 1993), South Korean beauty pageant titleholder
- Sungha Jung (born 1996), South Korean musician

=== Journalism ===
- Natalie Chung (born 1962), Canadian news anchor and journalist
- Sarah Jeong (born 1988), Korean-American journalist

=== Literature ===
- Jeong Ji-yong (1902–c. 1950), Korean poet and translator of English poetry
- Jung Hansuk (1922–1997), South Korean writer and literary critic
- Jung Hanmo (1923–1991), Korean poet
- Jeong Ho-seung (born 1950), South Korean poet
- Jung Chan (author) (born 1953), South Korean writer
- Jeong Do-sang (born 1960), South Korean novelist and children's author
- Jung Mikyung (1960–2017), South Korean novelist
- Ook Chung (born 1963), Japanese-born Canadian writer
- Jung Young-moon (born 1965), South Korean writer
- Jane Jeong Trenka (born 1972), South Korean-born American writer and adoptees' rights activist
- Jeong Yi-hyeon (born 1972), South Korean novelist
- Nicole Chung (born 1981), American writer and editor
- Catherine Chung, American novelist
- Jung Eun-gwol, South Korean novelist
- Philip W. Chung, Korean-American playwright
- Hansol Jung, South Korean playwright and translator

=== Politics and government ===
- Chung Chil-sung (1897–1958), Korean dancer, feminist and independence activist
- Chung Il-kwon (1917–1994), South Korean politician, diplomat, and soldier
- Chung Eun-yong (1923–2014), South Korean policeman and activist
- Jeong Rae-hyuk (1926–2022), South Korean military officer and politician
- Chung Won-shik (1928–2020), South Korean politician, educator, soldier and author
- Jeong Seung-hwa (1929–2002), South Korean general officer
- Chung Ho-yong (born 1932), South Korean army general and politician
- Chung Hong-won (born 1944), South Korean politician and lawyer
- Jeong Se-hyun (born 1945), South Korean politician
- Chung Un-chan (born 1947), South Korean politician and economist
- Chung Dong-young (born 1953), South Korean politician
- Jeong Seung-jo (born 1953), South Korean military officer
- Chung Doo-un (1957–2019), South Korean politician
- Roy Chung (born Chung Ryeu Sup, c. 1957), South Korean-born American soldier
- Choung Byoung-gug (born 1958), South Korean politician
- Chi Hyun Chung (born 1970), Korean-Bolivian doctor, evangelical pastor and politician
- Jeong Yol (born Jeong Min-suk, 1978), South Korean LGBT rights activist
- Jeong Kwang-il, North Korean defector and media smuggler
- Jong Thae-yang, North Korean diplomat

=== Religion ===
- Chai-Sik Chung (born 1930), Korean-born American social ethicist and sociologist of religion
- Nicholas Cheong Jin-suk (1931–2021), South Korean Cardinal of the Roman Catholic Church
- Chung Hyun Kyung (born 1956), South Korean lay theologian of the Presbyterian Church of Korea
- Jung Myung-seok (born 1945), South Korean religious leader and convicted rapist

=== Science ===
- Jae U. Jung (born 1960), South Korean-born American molecular biologist
- Chung Hyung-min (born 1964), South Korean biotechnology professor
- Sang-Wook Cheong, Korean-American materials scientist
- Jeong Su-il (1934–2025), South Korean historian
- Chung Heesun (born 1955), South Korean forensic scientist

=== Sports ===
==== Football ====
- Chung Kook-chin (1917–1976), South Korean football player
- Chung Nam-sik (1917–2005), South Korean football player and manager
- Chung Yeong-hwan (born 1938), South Korean football player
- Jung Byung-tak (1942–2016), South Korean football player and manager
- Jung Hae-seong (born 1958), South Korean football manager
- Chung Hae-won (1959–2020), South Korean football player and coach
- Chung Yong-hwan (1960–2015), South Korean football player and manager
- Chung Jong-soo (born 1961), South Korean football player
- Jeong Gi-dong (born 1961), South Korean football player
- Chung Jong-son (born 1966), South Korean football player
- Jung Sung-hoon (born 1968), South Korean football player
- Chung Sang-nam (born 1969), South Korean football manager
- Chung Jung-yong (born 1969), South Korean football player and coach
- Jung Jeong-soo (born 1969), South Korean football player
- Jung Jae-kwon (born 1970), South Korean football player and coach
- Jung Kwang-seok (born 1970), South Korean football manager
- Jung Kwang-min (born 1976), South Korean football player
- Chung Seok-keun (born 1977), South Korean football player
- Chung Yoo-suk (born 1977), South Korean football player
- Jeong Shung-hoon (born 1979), South Korean football player
- Jung Yong-hoon (1979–2003), South Korean football player
- Chung Kyung-ho (born 1980), South Korean football player
- Jung Jong-kwan (1981–2011), South Korean football player
- Jung Jung-suk (1982–2011), South Korean football player
- Jung Hong-youn (born 1983), South Korean football player
- Jong Tae-se (born 1984), Japanese-born North Korean football player
- Jung Ho-jin (born 1984), South Korean football player
- Jung Jo-gook (born 1984), South Korean football player and coach
- Jung Yoon-sung (born 1984), South Korean football player
- Jeong Kwang-sik (born 1985), South Korean football player
- Jung Hoon (born 1985), South Korean football player
- Jung Min-mu (born 1985), South Korean football player
- Jung Sung-ryong (born 1985), South Korean football player
- Jeong Hyuk (born 1986), South Korean football player
- Jung Chul-woon (born 1986), South Korean football player
- Jung In-whan (born 1986), South Korean football player
- Jung Myung-oh (born 1986), South Korean football player
- Jung Da-hwon (born 1987), South Korean football player
- Jung Dae-sun (born 1987), South Korean football player
- Jung Soo-jong (born 1987), South Korean football player
- Jeong Ho-jeong (born 1988), South Korean football player
- Jeong Seok-min (born 1988), South Korean football player
- Jeong Woo-in (born 1988), South Korean football player
- Jung Keun-hee (born 1988), South Korean football player
- Chung Woon (born 1989), South Korean football player
- Jeong Jun-yeon (born 1989), South Korean football player
- Jeong San (born 1989), South Korean football player
- Jung Seon-ho (born 1989), South Korean football player
- Jung Sung-min (born 1989), South Korean football player
- Jung Woo-young (born 1989), South Korean football player
- Jung Jae-yong (born 1990), South Korean football player
- Jung Ji-soo (born 1990), South Korean football player
- Jung Seol-bin (born Jung Hae-in, 1990), South Korean football player
- Jung Seok-hwa (born 1991), South Korean football player
- Jung Seung-yong (born 1991), South Korean football player
- Jong Il-gwan (born 1992), North Korean football player
- Jung Gi-woon (born 1992), South Korean football player
- Jung Min-woo (born 1992), South Korean football player
- Jeong Woo-jae (born 1992), South Korean football player
- Jeong Jae-hee (born 1994), South Korean football player
- Jung Seung-hyun (born 1994), South Korean football player
- Jeong Chi-in (born 1997), South Korean football player
- Jeong Seung-won (born 1997), South Korean football player
- Jeong Tae-wook (born 1997), South Korean football player
- Jeong Woo-yeong (born 1999), South Korean football player
- Jung Han-min (born 2001), South Korean football player
- Jeong Sang-bin (born 2002), South Korean football player
- Jung Seung-bae (born 2003), South Korean football player

==== Baseball ====
- Chung Min-tae (born 1970), South Korean baseball player
- Jung Soo-keun (born 1973), South Korean baseball player
- Chong Tae-hyon (born 1978), South Korean baseball player
- Jong Hyun-wook (born 1978), South Korean baseball player
- Jung Sung-ki (born 1979), South Korean baseball player
- Jeong Seong-hoon (born 1980), South Korean baseball player
- Jung Jae-hoon (born 1980), South Korean baseball player
- Chung Jae-hun (baseball, born 1981), South Korean baseball player
- Jeong Keun-woo (born 1982), South Korean baseball player
- Jung Woo-ram (born 1985), South Korean baseball player
- Jung Ju-hyeon (born 1990), South Korean baseball player
- Jung Soo-bin (born 1990), South Korean baseball player
- Jung Woo-young (baseball) (born 1999), South Korean baseball player

==== Basketball ====
- Jeong Myung-hee (born 1964), South Korean basketball player
- Chung Eun-soon (born 1971), South Korean basketball player
- Jung Sun-min (born 1974), South Korean basketball player
- Jung Mi-ran (born 1985), South Korean basketball player

==== Boxing and martial arts ====
- Chung Yong-taek (1921–2006), South Korean martial artist
- Chung Dong-hoon (born 1932), South Korean boxer
- Chung Shin-cho (born 1940), South Korean boxer
- Sun-hwan Chung (born 1940), South Korean Hapkido, Tang Soo Do and taekwondo grandmaster
- Chung Ki-young (born 1959), South Korean professional boxer
- Chung Hoon (born 1969), South Korean judoka
- Jung Sun-yong (born 1971), South Korean judoka
- Jung Sung-sook (born 1972), South Korean judoka
- Jung Bu-kyung (born 1978), South Korean judoka and mixed martial artist
- Jung Jae-eun (taekwondo) (born 1980), South Korean taekwondo practitioner
- Jeong Gyeong-mi (born 1985), South Korean judoka
- Chung Jung-yeon (born 1987), South Korean judoka
- Robin Cheong (born 1988), South Korean-born New Zealand taekwondo practitioner
- Joung Da-woon (born 1988), South Korean judoka
- The Korean Zombie (Chan Sung Jung, born 1987), South Korean mixed martial artist and kickboxer

==== Fencing ====
- Chung Soo-ki (born 1971), South Korean fencer
- Jung Gil-ok (born 1980), South Korean foil fencer
- Jung Seung-hwa (born 1981), South Korean épée fencer
- Jung Hyo-jung (born 1984), South Korean épée fencer
- Jung Jin-sun (born 1984), South Korean épée fencer

==== Handball ====
- Jeung Soon-bok (born 1960), South Korean handball player
- Jeong Hyoi-soon (born 1964), South Korean handball player
- Jeong Yi-kyeong (born 1985), South Korean handball player
- Jung Ji-hae (born 1985), South Korean handball player
- Jung Su-young (born 1985), South Korean handball player
- Jung Jin-ho (handballer) (born 1986), South Korean handball player
- Jeong Han (born 1988), South Korean handball player
- Jung Yu-ra (born 1992), South Korean handball player

==== Racket sports ====
- Chung Hyun-sook (born 1951 or 1952), South Korean table tennis player
- Chung So-young (born 1967), South Korean badminton player
- Chung Hee-seok (born 1977), South Korean tennis player
- Jung Jae-sung (1982–2018), South Korean badminton player
- Jung Kyung-eun (born 1990), South Korean badminton player
- Jeoung Young-sik (born 1992), South Korean table tennis player
- Chung Hong (born 1993), South Korean tennis player
- Chung Hyeon (born 1996), South Korean tennis player
- Chung Yun-seong (born 1998), South Korean tennis player

==== Running ====
- Jong Song-ok (born 1974), North Korean long-distance runner and politician
- Jong Myong-chol (born 1978), North Korean long-distance runner
- Jong Yong-ok (born 1981), North Korean long-distance runner
- Chung Yun-hee (born 1983), South Korean long-distance runner
- Jeong Jin-hyeok (born 1991), South Korean long-distance runner

==== Swimming ====
- Jeong On-ra (born 1982), South Korean swimmer
- Jeong Doo-hee (born 1984), South Korean swimmer
- Jung Seul-ki (born 1988), South Korean swimmer
- Jong Yon-hui (born 1989), North Korean synchronised swimmer
- Jeong Da-rae (born 1991), South Korean swimmer
- Jung Won-yong (born 1992), South Korean swimmer

==== Volleyball ====
- Jong Ok-jin (born 1945), North Korean volleyball player
- Chung Dong-kee (born 1949), South Korean volleyball player
- Chong Moon-kyong (born 1950), South Korean volleyball player
- Jung Soon-ok (volleyball) (born 1955), South Korean volleyball player
- Chung Sun-hye (born 1975), South Korean volleyball player
- Jung Dae-young (born 1981), South Korean volleyball player
- Jeong Min-su (born 1991), South Korean volleyball player
- Jong Jin-sim (born 1992), North Korean volleyball player

==== Wrestling ====
- Jung Soon-won (born 1973), South Korean wrestler
- Jung Young-ho (born 1982), South Korean freestyle wrestler
- Jung Ji-hyun (born 1983), South Korean wrestler
- Jong Hak-jin (born 1986), North Korean wrestler
- Jong Myong-suk (born 1993), North Korean wrestler

==== Other athletes ====
- Jeong Gyeong-hun (born 1961), South Korean modern pentathlete
- Chung Sang-hyun (born 1963), South Korean field hockey player
- Chung Eun-kyung (born 1965), South Korean field hockey player
- Jung Da-yeon (born 1966), South Korean fitness guru and diet writer
- Eugene Chung (born 1969), American football offensive tackle and coach
- Jung Sung-il (figure skater) (born 1969), South Korean figure skater
- Jeong Mi (born 1970), South Korean sprint canoer
- Chung Il-mi (born 1972), South Korean golfer
- Chung Jae-hun (archer) (born 1974), South Korean archer
- Jung Dong-ho (born 1975), South Korean track-and-field athlete
- Alice Jung (born 1982), South Korean-born American BMX racer
- Jung Soon-ok (born 1983), South Korean long jumper
- Jung Sang-jin (javelin thrower) (born 1984), South Korean javelin thrower
- Jong Chun-mi (born 1985), North Korean weightlifter
- Jeong Ho-won (born 1986), South Korean paralympic boccia player
- Jeong Mi-ra (born 1987), South Korean sports shooter
- Jung Hye-lim (born 1987), South Korean hurdler
- Jong Yong-hyok (born 1988), North Korean pair skater
- Jung Dong-hyun (born 1988), South Korean alpine skier
- Jung Eun-ju (born 1988), South Korean short-track speed skater
- Jung Ba-ra (born 1989), South Korean short-track speed skater
- Jung Seung-hwan (sledge hockey) (born 1988), South Korean ice sledge hockey player
- Jung Jin-hwa (born 1989), South Korean modern pentathlete
- David Chung (golfer) (born 1990), American golfer
- Jin Jeong (born Jeong Yeon-jin, 1990), South Korean golfer
- Jung Dasomi (born 1990), South Korean archer
- Jong Kum-hwa (born 1993), North Korean acrobatic gymnast
- Denis Ten (1993–2018), Kazakhstani figure skater

== See also ==
- Korean name
- List of Korean surnames
- Jung (disambiguation)
