= Yu Ri =

Yu Ri may refer to:

- Yu-ri (Korean name), a Korean given name
- Yūri, a Japanese given name
- Yuri (genre), Japanese female-female romance genre
