= Chung Jae-hun =

Chung Jae-hun may refer to:

- Chung Jae-hun (archer) (정재헌, born 1974), archer and Olympic silver medalist from South Korea
- Chung Jae-hun (baseball, born 1980) (정재훈), a South Korean starting pitcher for the Doosan Bears
- Chung Jae-hun (baseball, born 1981) (정재훈), former South Korean pitcher for the Doosan Bears

== See also ==
- Jeong Jae-heon (born 1975), South Korean voice actor
