= Kwang-il =

- Hangul: 광일
- RR: Gwangil
- MR: Kwangil

Kwang-il or Gwang-il (Korean: 광일) is a Korean given name. Notable people with the name include:

- Jeong Kwang-il, North Korean defector
- Jo Gwang-il (born 1996), South Korean rapper
- Kwon Kwang-il (born 1990), North Korean sport shooter
- Park Kwang-il (born 1991), South Korean football midfielder
- Ri Kwang-il (born 1988), North Korean football goalkeeper
- Rim Kwang-il, North Korean general and politician
- Shin Gwang-il (fl. 2019–present), vocalist and drummer in South Korean band Lucy
