= Yuri (Japanese name) =

- Gender: Female

Origin
- Origin: Japanese
- Meaning: Different meanings depending on the kanji used

Other names
- Related names: Yūri; Yurie; Yurika; Yuriko

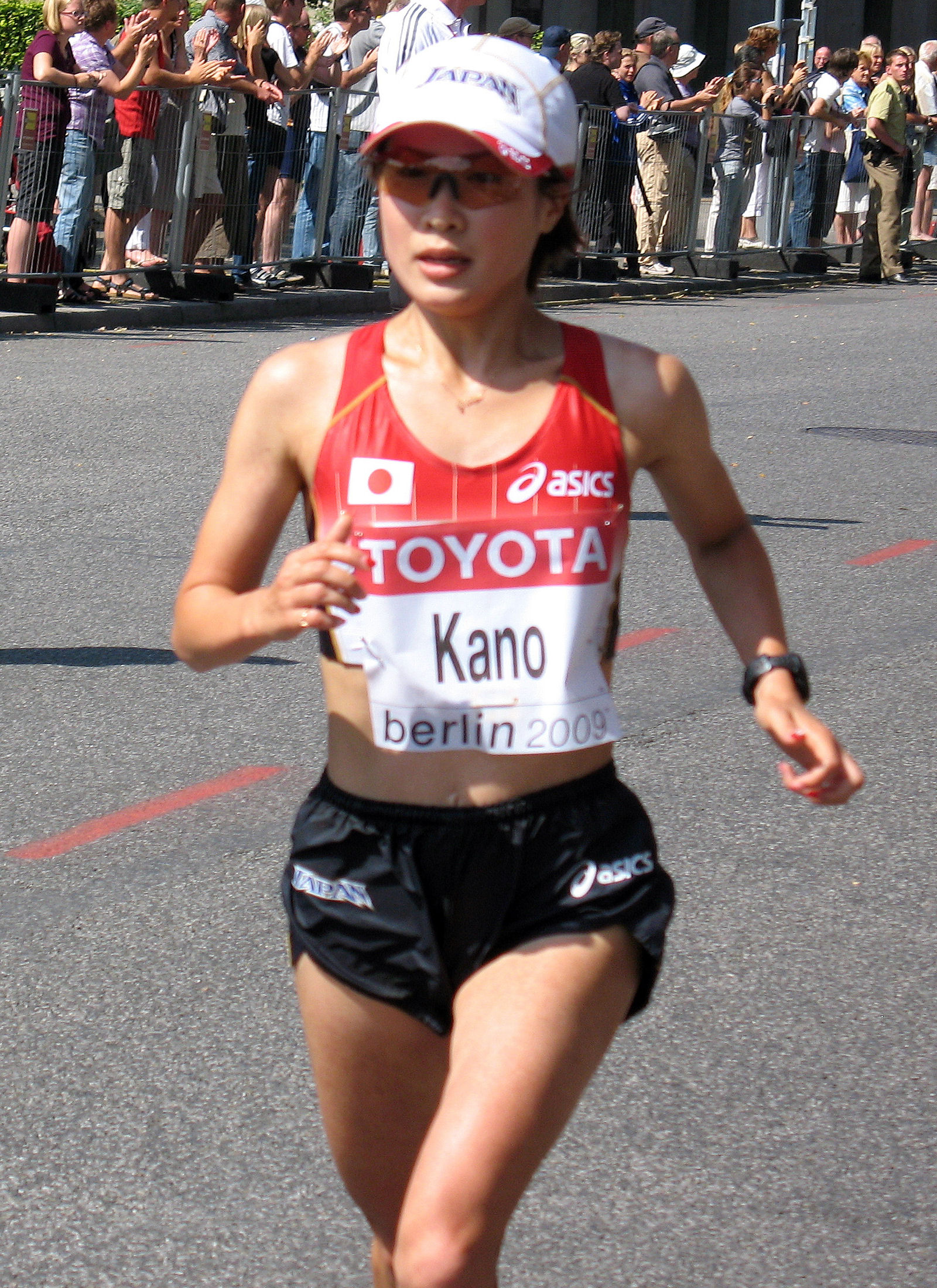
Japanese long distance runner Yuri Kano in Berlin

Yuri (ゆり, ユリ) is a Japanese given name. Although it sounds similar, it is completely unrelated to the Slavic name Yuri.

== Written forms ==
Yuri can be written using different kanji characters and can mean:

- 由里, "reason, village"
- 由理, "reason, logic"
- 由利, "reason, profit"
- 由梨, "reason, pear"
- 祐里, "to help, village"
- 友里, "friend, village"
- 友理, "friend, logic"
- 有里, "exist, village"
- 有莉, "exist, white jasmine/pear"
- 百合, "lily"

The name can also be written in hiragana or katakana.

== People ==
- Yuri Amano (由梨; born 1966), Japanese voice actress
- Yuri Ebihara (友里; born 1979), Japanese model and actress
- Yuri Ichii (由理; born 1972), Japanese singer and rapper
- Yuri Kanō (由理; born 1978), Japanese long-distance runner
- Yuri Kasahara (由里), Japanese opera singer
- Yuri Kochiyama (百合; 1921–2014), Japanese-American activist
- Yuri Komura (born 1992), Japanese ice hockey player
- Yuri Komuro (友里; born 1976), Japanese actress, writer and adult video actress
- Yuri Masuda (祐里; born 1977), Japanese singer
- Yuri Nagai (友理; born 1992) Japanese field hockey player
- Yuri Nakagawa (友里; born 1989), Japanese model
- Yuri Nakamura (友理; born 1982), Japanese actress and singer
- Yuri Nakamura (singer) (由利; born 1977), Japanese composer and singer
- Yuri Narushima (ゆり), Japanese manga artist
- Yuri Noguchi (ゆり; born 1992), Japanese voice actress
- Yuri Shiratori (由里; born 1968), Japanese voice actress and singer
- Yuri Yamaoka (ゆり), Japanese voice actress
- Yuri Yasuda (有里; born 1983), Japanese businesswoman
- Yuri (poet) (百合; 1694–1764), Japanese poet and calligrapher

== Fictional characters ==
- Yuri (ユリ), a character in the light novel series Dirty Pair
- Yuri (ユリ), a character in the visual novel Doki Doki Literature Club!
- Yuri Ashida (有莉), a character in the anime series Aikatsu Stars!
- Yuri Miyazono (ゆり), a protagonist of Witchblade: Ao no Shōjo novel
- Yuri Nakamura (ゆり), a character in the anime series Angel Beats!
- Yuri Sakazaki (ユリ), a character in the video game series Art of Fighting
- Yuri Suzuki (夕梨), a character in the manga series Red River
- Yuri Tanima (ゆり), a character in the manga series Wedding Peach
- Yuri Tsukikage (ゆり), a character from the anime HeartCatch Pretty Cure!
- Yuri Tamura (ゆり), a character in the manga Watamote
- Yuri Tachibana (由里), a character in the film Godzilla, Mothra and King Ghidorah: Giant Monsters All-Out Attack
- Yuri Ushigome (ゆり), a character in the multimedia BanG Dream!
- Yuri Isami (衣佐美 佑理), a character from the supernatural mobile game Tokyo Debunker

== Yūri ==
Yūri
- Gender: Unisex

Origin
- Origin: Japanese
- Meaning: Different meanings depending on the kanji used

Yūri or Yuuri is a separate unisex Japanese given name, though it may be romanized the same way.

=== Written forms ===
Common spellings of the name, with their literal meanings, include:

- 悠里, "permanence, village"
- 裕理, "abundant, logic"
- 優理, "excellent, logic"
- 侑李, "urge to eat, plum"
- 勇利, "courage, profit"

The name can also be written in hiragana (ゆうり, ゆーり) or katakana (ユウリ, ユーリ).

=== People ===
- Yuri Chinen (侑李; born 1993), Japanese singer and actor
- Yuri Fudoh (裕理; born 1976), Japanese golfer
- Yuri Kawamura (優理; born 1989), Japanese footballer
- Yuuri Morishita (悠里; born 1985), Japanese singer
- Yuri Obara (悠里; born 1980), Japanese speed skater
- Yuri Okubo (勇利; born 2000), Japanese snowboarder
- Yuuri Rukawa (ゆうり; born 1999), Japanese actress
- Yu-ri Yoshida (有里; born 1992), Japanese voice actress
- Yuuri (singer-songwriter) (優里; born 1994), Japanese singer-songwriter and YouTuber

=== Fictional characters ===
- Yuuri (ユーリ), a character in the manga series Girls' Last Tour
- Yuri Kagarin (有理), a character from Super Danganronpa Another 2: Moon of Hope and Sun of Despair
- Yuri Katsuki (勇利) and Yuri Plisetsky (ユーリ・プリセツキー), characters in the anime series Yuri on Ice
- Yuri Kozukata (夕莉), a character from the video game series Fatal Frame
- Yūri Wakasa (悠里), a character in the manga series School-Live!
- Yuri (ユウリ), a character in the Super Sentai season Mirai Sentai Timeranger
- Yuri (ユーリス), a character in Fire Emblem: Three Houses
- Yuri Lowell (ユーリ・ローウェル), the main character in the video game Tales of Vesperia

== See also ==
- Yuriko
- Yuri (Slavic name)
- Yu-ri (Korean name)
