= Yuuri =

Yuuri may refer to:

- Yuri (Japanese name)
- Yuuri (wrestler)
- Yuuri (singer-songwriter)
