= Yuriko =

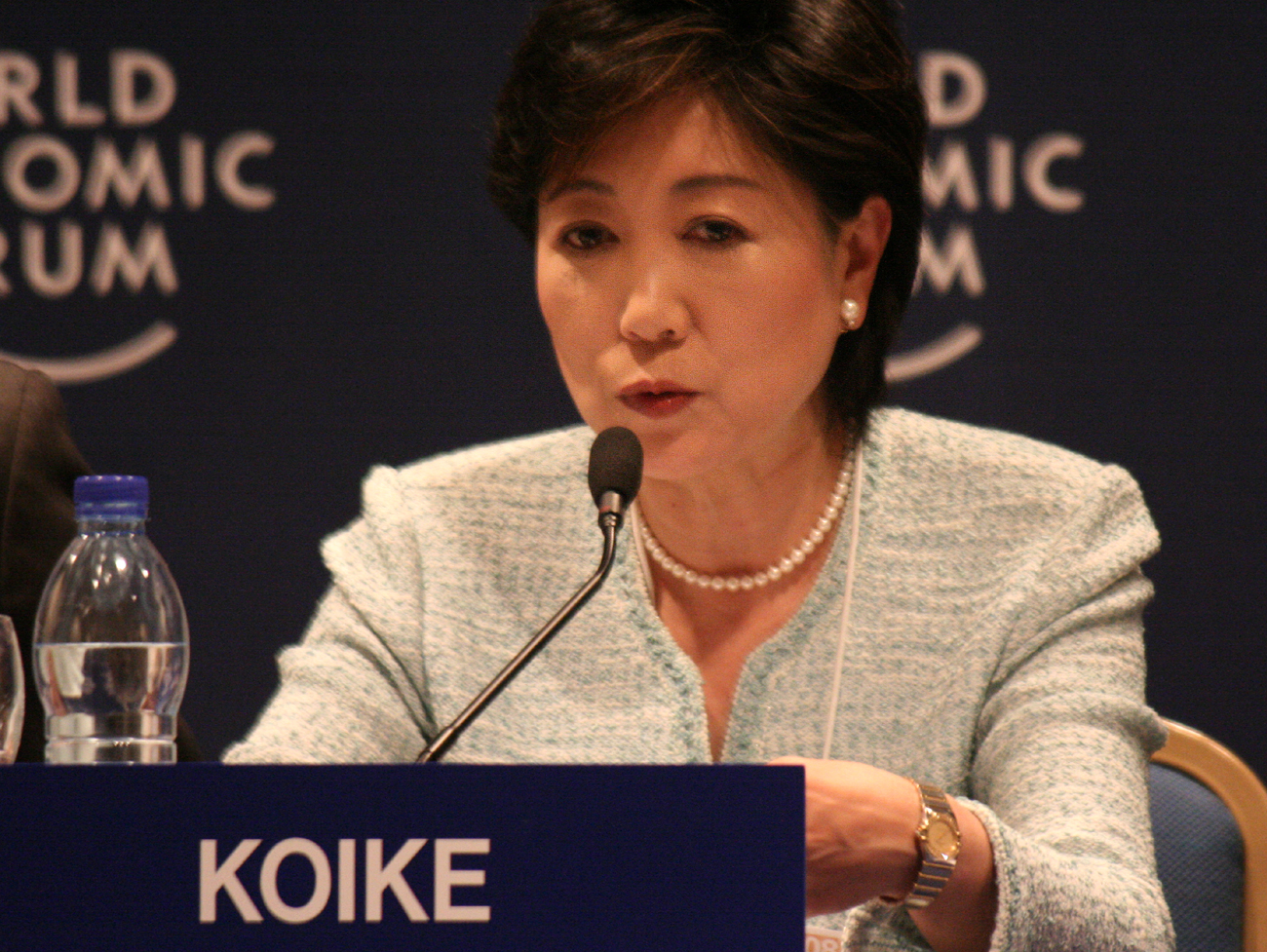
- Yuriko Koike, a politician
- Pronunciation: Yúriko
- Gender: Female

Origin
- Origin: Japanese
- Meaning: It can have many different meanings depending on the kanji used.
- Region of origin: Japan

Other names
- Related names: Yuri; Yurika; Yurie

Yuriko (ゆりこ, ユリコ, ゆり子) is a common Japanese given name, used for women.

== Written forms ==
Yuriko can be written using different kanji characters and can mean:

- 百合子, "lily, child"
- 由里子, "reason, hometown, child"
- 由利子, "reason, benefit, child"
- 由李子, "reason, plum, child"
- 優梨子, "tenderness, pear, child"
- 有里子, "possess, hometown, child"

The name can also be written in hiragana or katakana.

== Real people ==
with the given name Yuriko

- Yuriko Backes, a Luxembourgish diplomat and politician
- Alisa Yuriko Durbrow (ユリコ), a Japanese model, actress, and singer
- Angela Yuriko Smith, Ryukyuan-American writer and publisher
- Yuriko Chiba (千羽 由利子), a Japanese animation director
- Yuriko Doi, choreographer and stage director
- Yuriko Fuchizaki (渕崎 ゆり子), a Japanese voice actress
- Yuriko Fujii (born 1972), Japanese boccia player
- Yuriko Hanabusa (1900–1970), Japanese actress
- Yuriko Handa (百合子), a Japanese volleyball player
- Yuriko Hirohashi (広橋 百合子; 1916–1977), Japanese high jumper
- Yuriko Hishimi (ひし美 ゆり子), a Japanese actress
- Yuriko Hoshi (1943–2018), Japanese actress
- Yuriko Ishida (石田 ゆり子), a Japanese actress
- Yuriko Kaida (貝田 由里子), a Japanese singer
- Yuriko Kajiya (百合子), a Japanese ballerina
- Yuriko Kikuchi (née Amemiya, 1920–2022), a Japanese American dancer
- Yuriko Kimura, Japanese dancer
- Yuriko Kobayashi (祐梨子), a Japanese middle distance runner
- Yuriko Koike (小池 百合子), a Japanese politician
- Yuriko Kotani, Japanese comedian
- Yuriko Kuronuma (ユリ子), a Japanese violinist
- Yuriko Miki (born 1989), Japanese retired badminton player
- Yuriko Miyamoto (宮本 百合子), a Japanese novelist
- Yuriko Mochizuki (望月 百合子), a Japanese anarcha-feminist
- Yuriko Nakamura (由利子), a Japanese composer and pianist
- Yuriko Nanahara (born 1972), Japanese gymnast
- Yuriko Ono (born 1989), Japanese actress
- Yuriko Osawa (born 1996), Japanese synchronized swimmer
- Yuriko Renardy, Japanese mathematician
- Yuriko Saito (born 1953), Japanese philosopher
- Yuriko Shima (島 由理子), Japanese footballer
- Yuriko Shiratori (百合子), a Japanese gravure idol, tarento and actress
- Yuriko Takagi (高木 百合子, 1923–2024), later Princess Mikasa of Japan
- Yuriko Takahashi (高橋 百合子; born 1973), Japanese weightlifter
- Yuriko Takeshita (竹下 百合子; born 1988), Japanese slalom canoeist
- Yuriko Tiger (born 1993), Italian-Japanese cosplayer and promotional model
- Yuriko Yamaguchi (山口 由里子), (born 1965) a Japanese voice actress
- Yuriko Yamaguchi, a Japanese American sculptor
- Yuriko Yamamoto (山本 百合子), a Japanese voice actress
- Yuriko Yoshitaka (吉高 由里子), a Japanese actress

== Fictional characters ==
with the given name Yuriko

- Yuriko Omega (百合子Ω), the commando unit of the Empire of the Rising Sun in the real-time strategy video game Command & Conquer: Red Alert 3
- Yuriko Oyama (ユリコ・オヤマ, also known as Lady Deathstrike), a Marvel Comics villain
- Yuriko Star (ユリコ), a character in the manga and anime series The Irresponsible Captain Tylor
- Yuriko Janetson is the name of the narrator's daughter in Joanna Russ's short story "When It Changed"
- Yuriko Suzuhina is the name of the cross dressing version of Accelerator by Kamijou Touma in the To Aru Majutsu no Index.
- Yuriko Edogawa, a character from Ultra Q
- Yuriko, the Tiger's Shadow is a card from the Magic: The Gathering trading card game.
- Yuriko Nishinotouin, Head of the Traditional Culture Research Club at Hyakkou Private Academy in the anime Kakegurui.
- Yuriko Kogami, a character from Beautiful Bones: Sakurako's Investigation

== See also ==
- Yuriko (publishing house)
- Yuri (Japanese name)
- 13146 Yuriko, a Main-belt Asteroid
