= Yurie =

- Gender: Female

Origin
- Origin: Japanese
- Meaning: Different meanings depending on the kanji used
- Region of origin: Japan

Other names
- Related names: Yuri; Yurika; Yuriko

Yurie (ゆりえ, ユリエ) is a feminine Japanese given name.

== Written forms ==
Forms in kanji can include:

- 由理恵, "reason, logic, blessing"
- 由梨恵, "reason, pear, blessing"
- 友里絵, "friend, hometown, picture"
- 友里恵, "friend, hometown, blessing"
- 友理恵, "friend, logic, blessing"
- 友理枝, "friend, logic, branch"
- 友利恵, "friend, profit, blessing"
- 有里枝, "exist, hometown, branch"
- 百合枝, "lily, branch"

The name can also be written in hiragana or katakana.

== People ==
- Yurie Adachi (友里恵; born 1985), Japanese ice hockey player
- Yurie Igoma (伊駒 ゆりえ), Japanese voice actress
- Yurie Kanuma (鹿沼 由理恵; born 1981), paralympic cross-country skier
- Yurie Katano (片野 友理恵; born 1990), ex-member of AKB48
- Yurie Katō (加藤 友里恵; born 1987), Japanese triathlete
- Yurie Kobori (友里絵; born 1983), Japanese voice actress
- Yurie Alicia Kinoshita (ユリエ; born 1967), Japanese sailor
- Yurie Kozakai (小坂井祐莉絵; born 1995), Japanese voice actress
- Yurie Midori (友利恵; born 1991), Japanese actress and gravure idol
- Yurie Miura (友理枝; born 1981), Japanese pianist and actress
- Yurie Nabeya (友理枝; born 1993), Japanese volleyball player
- Yurie Nagashima (有里枝; born 1973), Japanese photographer
- Yurie Omi (友里恵; born 1988), Japanese television reporter and news anchor
- Yurie Tanaka (友理恵; born 1989), Japanese biathlete
- Yurie Watabe (由梨恵; born 1989), Japanese freestyle skier

== Fictional characters ==
- Yurie Hitotsubashi (ゆりえ) of Kamichu!
- Yurie (百合枝) of Ping Pong (manga)

== See also ==
- Yuriko (disambiguation)
