= Yurika =

- Gender: Female

Origin
- Origin: Japanese
- Meaning: Different meanings depending on the kanji used.
- Region of origin: Japan

Other names
- Related names: Yuri; Yuriko; Yurie

Yurika (ゆりか, ユリカ) is a feminine Japanese given name.

== Written forms ==
Forms in kanji can include:

- 百合果, "lily, fruit"
- 由里香, "reason, hometown, fragrance"
- 由利加, "reason, profit, addition"
- 友里花, "friend, hometown, flower"
- 友里加, "friend, hometown, addition"
- 友里香, "friend, hometown, fragrance"
- 友梨香, "friend, pear, fragrance"
- 祐里香, "to help, hometown, fragrance"
- 夕梨花, "evening, pear, flower"

The name can also be written in hiragana or katakana.

== People ==
- Yurika (musician) (友里花; born 1995), Japanese musician
- Yurika Abe (阿部 友里香; born 1995), Japanese paralympic cross-country skier and biathlete
- Yurika Aizawa (逢沢 ゆりか; born 1979), Japanese voice actress
- Yurika Endō (遠藤 ゆりか; born 1994), Japanese voice actress and singer
- Yurika Furuya (古谷 柚里花; born 2000), Japanese member of the Up Up Girls Kakko Kari
- Yurika Harada (原田 百合果; born 1988), Japanese fashion model and singer
- Yurika Hino (日野 由利加; born 1963), Japanese voice actress
- Yurika Hirayama (平山 友梨香; born 1990), Japanese ski jumper
- Yurika Jūmonji (十文字 ゆりか; born 1984), Japanese hypnotist and tarento
- Yurika Kubo (久保 ユリカ; born 1989), Japanese voice actress and singer
- Yurika Nakamura (actress) (中村 ゆりか; born 1997), Japanese actress
- Yurika Nakamura (runner) (中村 友梨香; born 1986), Japanese long-distance runner
- Yurika Ochiai (落合 祐里香; born 1979), Japanese voice actress
- Yurika Oka (岡 優里佳; born 2003), Japanese professional wrestler
- Yurika Ōyama (大山 由里香; born 1974), Japanese bowling player
- Yurika Sema (瀬間 友里加; born 1986), Japanese tennis player
- Yurika Yoshida (吉田 夕梨花; born 1993), Japanese curler

== Fictional characters ==
- Yurika Misumaru (ユリカ), character from the anime Martian Successor Nadesico
- Yurika Kirishima (ゆりか), character from the Rival Schools video game series
- Yurika Tōdō (ユリカ), angry vampire from Aikatsu!
- Yurika Nijino (ゆりか), from Rokujouma no Shinryakusha
- Yurika, Otakuthon mascot

== See also ==
- Yurîka or Yuriika refers to Eureka, a 2000 Japanese film directed by Shinji Aoyama
