= Jung Da-yeon =

South Korean professional coach (born 1966)

- 정다연
- Born: November 27, 1966 (age 59); Incheon, South Korea
- Occupations: fitness personality, diet writer, YouTuber
- Years active: 2003–present
- Known for: Bodybuilding
- Height: 1.62 m (5 ft 4 in)
- Spouse: Yang Seung-beom (m. 2003)
- Children: 2

YouTube information
- Channel: JUNGDAYEON
- Years active: 2013–present
- Genre: Fitness
- Subscribers: 331 thousand
- Last updated: November 25, 2024

Korean name
- Hangul: 정다연
- Hanja: 鄭多燕
- RR: Jeong Dayeon
- MR: Chŏng Tayŏn
- Website: jungdayeon.com

Jung Da-yeon is a South Korean health influencer widely known as a Korean popular culture figure under the moniker "Auntie with a striking body" (Korean: 몸짱 아줌마; RR: momjjang ajumma).

Jung's popularity has since spread to other Asian regions. She has become a fitness phenomenon in Japan, following her appearance on NHK by the year 2004 and her books on diet have become bestsellers; her second book "Momjjang Diet Premium" sold 200,000 copies in just two weeks after publication in Japan. The success of her books was followed by Mom-chan Diet Wii Figureobics by Jung Da-Yeon, a fitness game released by Wii in December 2010.

Jung also starred in a series of television commercials for Hong Kong-based retail chain Mannings, in which she trains with an overweight cat mascot.

== Biography ==
Jung Da-yeon was an interior designer before marriage. After marriage, she had two children. She became obese due to lack of exercise. At the age of 30, she lost weight on the advice of a doctor due to health problems. After successfully losing weight, she promoted her own weight loss fitness exercise and became a famous artist in South Korea. Her deeds were written into Korean high school textbooks as teaching materials. Because she made her weight loss experience public on the Internet column, it became a hot topic and caused a great response in South Korea. It also led to the birth of words such as "몸짱 (Mom-jjang, the most perfect body)" and "S라인 (S line, S curve)" which symbolizes the ultimate female beauty. "Mom-jjang syndrome" was even selected as one of the top ten news in South Korea. She is also well-known in Chinese-speaking regions and is known as the "beauty witch" and "super hot mom".

== Controversy ==
In January 2019, the probiotic enzyme tablets and other weight loss products endorsed by Zheng Duoyan, "Dayeonsu", were found to contain laxative ingredients by the Yunlin District Prosecutor's Office. Since the product contained Western medicine laxative ingredients and was not manufactured with the permission of the health authorities, it clearly violated the Pharmaceutical Affairs Act. 441,520 finished products and 1,320.63 kilograms of semi-finished products of Dayeonsu probiotic enzyme tablets were seized, and it was initially estimated that millions of tablets had been eaten by consumers.

== Books ==
- 2011: 塑身女皇教你打造完美曲線
- 2012: 塑身女皇完美曲線伸展操
- 2012: 塑身女皇美胸、美腹、美臀DANCE
- 2013: 塑身女皇教你吃出窈窕與健康：一天6餐，13年不復胖的秘密
- 2013: 塑身女皇鄭多蓮D-21局部塑身(蜜桃臀&纖長腿)
- 2013: 塑身女皇鄭多蓮D-21局部塑身(馬甲線&小蠻腰)
- 2013: 塑身女皇鄭多蓮D-21局部塑身(緊實臂&性感鎖骨)
- 2013: 塑身女皇鄭多蓮D-21局部塑身(渾圓胸&誘人美背)
- 2014: 塑身女皇鄭多蓮D-21局部塑身套書(1~4冊)

== MV ==
- 2013 - OneTwoFree - “GYM”

== See also ==
- Se-rim Moon
