= Yuri Yasuda =

Japanese businesswoman and art collector (born 1983)

Yuri "Yureeka" Yasuda
- 安田有里 (やすだ ゆり)
- Born: Yuri Yasuda; 21 June 1983 (age 42)
- Education: Sophia University

Yuri "Yureeka" Yasuda (Japanese: 安田有里; born 21 June 1983) also known as Yureeka is a Japanese businesswoman and art collector. Born in Tokyo and raised in New York City, she graduated from Sophia University with a bachelor's degree in Comparative Cultures.

== Early life and education ==
Yuri Yasuda was born in Tokyo in 1983. Her great-grandfather, Hizume Masaharu was a doctor as well as a poet who has published a collection of tanka, a thirty-one syllabled verse. Her grandfather, Nobuaki Hizume was the head bureaucrat of the Ministry of Economy, Trade and Industry, as well as the former Director-General of Small and Medium Enterprises, former vice-president of Daimaru Department Store. (He was also appointed as the Chairman of Kansai Association of Corporate Executives for 2 terms during the Showa period.) Her father runs a business related to art in New York City, United States. Her mother is a former poet with several books published, her eldest sister is a professor at a university in the United States.

== Career ==
Wonderlily Co., Ltd.
- Founded: 16 November 2007
- Founder: Yuri Yasuda
- Headquarters: Tokyo, Japan
- Website: http://www.wonderlily.jp/ http://harney.jp/ www.tokyoartoffice.com

Wonderlily was founded in 2007 by Yureeka, where she began her first deal as the exclusive Japanese license owner of a tea brand, Harney & Sons. Since the foundation, she has built over 350 accounts across Japan, launching customized pet bottles limited to Japan, collaborating with various luxury brands such as Lexus, Louis Vuitton, Sony and have supported over 100 events including the American Embassy, Christian Dior, TED x, and more.

The products she works with are brands she discovered overseas and felt confident would be popular in Japan, holding an exclusive contract. She discovered Harney & Sons during her trip to New York where she came across the taste in a hotel suite, which eventually led her into the business she has today.

She founded The Tea Time Company in 2015, and opened the first direct retail store of Harney & Sons Japan in JR Nagoya Takashimaya. Yuko Nagayama, an architect who also designed the Louis Vuitton boutique in Kyoto worked on the interior design.

In 2015, Yureeka became the brand ambassador for Pont des Arts wine. Pont des Arts also participated as the VIP sponsor for Art Fair Tokyo in both 2016 and 2017. Pont des Arts have also hosted collaboration events in Tokyo with Aston Martin and Christian Dior.

She founded Tokyo Art Office (TAO) in 2017, which have been working with Art Fair Tokyo and The Fine Art Group, the largest art fund in the world.

Dating back to her student years, Yureeka has been featured in various magazines on her fashion sense and lifestyle, and on her animated character and background.

In 2013, she began writing regular columns on art for Commons & Sense magazine. She continues to contribute essays and interviews on artists and art collectors on various platforms.
