= Jung Sung-ki =

Sung-Ki Jung

NC Dinos
- Pitcher
- Born: August 6, 1979 (age 46); Yeosu, South Korea
- Bats: Right Throws: Right

KBO statistics (through 2013 season)
- Win–loss record: 0–0
- Earned run average: 3.86
- Strikeouts: 5

Teams
- NC Dinos (2013)

Sung-Ki Jung (born August 6, 1979) is a baseball pitcher who currently plays for the NC Dinos in the Korea Baseball Organization.

== Personal life and name ==
Jung was born in Yeosu, South Korea. He attended Soonchun High School.

His name has been spelled numerous ways. He has also been known as Sung Jung and Jeong Seong-Ki.

== Professional career ==
Jung was signed by the Atlanta Braves of Major League Baseball and played in their minor league system from 2002 to 2003 and from 2007 to 2008. He did not play from 2004 to 2006 because he was serving mandatory military time in his home country. In his four-year career, he posted a 3-8 won-loss record and had 47 saves and a 2.70 ERA in 143 games. In 180 1/3 innings, he had 201 strikeouts.

He joined the NC Dinos in 2012, when it was still a member of the Korea Baseball Futures League. The Dinos joined the Korea Baseball Championship in 2013. Jung made 5 relief appearances for NC that year, posting a 3.86 ERA with a 0-0 record.
