= Jeong Nam =

South Korean voice actor

Jung Nam (Korean: 정남) is a South Korean voice actor who joined the Munhwa Broadcasting Corporation's Voice Acting Division in 1996. She also has acting experience and was in the Korean version of 24 as Nina Myers.

== Roles ==
=== Broadcast TV ===
- 24 (replacing Sarah Clarke, Korea TV edition, MBC)
- CSI: Miami (replacing Khandi Alexander, Korea TV edition, MBC)
- Ojamajo Doremi (1st series in Majoruca, Korea TV edition, MBC)
- Apple Tree (narration, MBC)
- Risingo (Korea TV edition, MBC)
- Children's to New Life (narration, MBC)
- Mother's Song (MBC)
- Honey, I Shrunk the Kids: The TV Show (Korea TV edition, MBC)

=== Film dubbing ===
- Sabrina (Korea TV edition, MBC)
- Unagi (Korea TV edition, MBC)
- Independence Day (Korea TV edition, MBC)
- Blade II (replacing Leonor Varela, Korea TV edition, MBC)

== See also ==
- Munhwa Broadcasting Corporation
- MBC Voice Acting Division
