= Yu-ri (Korean name) =

- Hangul: 유리
- RR: Yuri
- MR: Yuri

Yu-ri, also spelled Yuri, Yoo-ri or You-ri, is a Korean given name.

Korean people with this name include:

- Yuri of Goguryeo (died 18 AD), second ruler of Goguryeo
- Yuri of Silla (died 57 AD), third ruler of Silla
- Yuri (Korean singer) (born 1976), stage name of Cha Hyun-ok, South Korean singer
- Sung Yu-ri (born 1981), South Korean actress and singer
- Lee Yoo-ri (born 1982), South Korean actress and businesswoman
- Jung Yu-ri (born 1984), South Korean singer
- Kim Yoo-ri (born 1984), South Korean actress
- Seo Yu-ri (born 1985), South Korean voice actress
- Kim You-ri (born 1987), South Korean female track cyclist
- Kim Yu-ri (1989–2011), South Korean model
- Kwon You-ri (born 1989), South Korean swimmer
- Kwon Yuri (born 1989), South Korean singer and actress, member of Girls' Generation
- Jong Yu-ri (born 1992), North Korean footballer
- Choe Yu-ri (born 1994), South Korean footballer
- Lee Yu-ri (field hockey) (born 1994), South Korean field hockey player
- Jo Yuri (born 2001), South Korean singer, former member of Iz*One

Fictional characters with this name include

- Han Yoo-ri, in 2003 South Korean television series Stairway to Heaven
- Lee Yu-ri, in 2009 South Korean sitcom High Kick Through the Roof
- Cha Yu-ri, in 2020 South Korean television series Hi Bye, Mama!
- Park Yu-ri, in 2020 South Korean Netflix adaptation Sweet Home
- Ki Yu-ri, in 2020 South Korean television series Tale of the Nine Tailed

== See also ==
- List of Korean given names
