= Chung Chil-sung =

Korean dancer and activist (1897–1958)

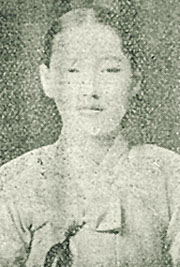
- Chung ca. 1925

Korean name
- Hangul: 정칠성
- Hanja: 丁七星
- RR: Jeong Chilseong
- MR: Chŏng Ch'ilsŏng

Art name
- Hangul: 금죽
- Hanja: 錦竹, 琴竹
- RR: Geumjuk
- MR: Kŭmjuk

Chung Chil-sung (정칠성, 1897-1958), also known by her art name Geumjuk (금죽) was a Korean dancer, feminist, and independence activist. She was a former Kisaeng who became a major figure in Geunuhoe (근우회) and Samwolhoe (삼월회). She abandoned performing after participating in the March 1st Movement of 1919, which inspired her shift toward nationalism, socialism, and women's activism. Her studies in Tokyo during the early 1920s deepened her engagement with Marxist feminist ideas and shaped her class-centered perspective to women's liberation.

She was active in women's labor, literacy, and socialist movements in the 1920s-30s, helping lead Samwolhoe, redefining the "New Woman" from a proletarian feminist perspective, and played a significant part in founding and expanding Geunuhoe, eventually serving as its Chair of the Central Executive Committee. Through lectures, literacy campaigns, and editorial work, she advocated for women workers and promoted political education.

After intensified colonial repression in the 1930s, Chung continued vocational and educational work until Korea's liberation in 1945. She then joined socialist women's organizations in the South and later moved to North Korea, where she continued political activity until she was believed to have been purged around 1958.

== Early life ==
Chung Chil-sung was born in Daegu in 1897, but later relocated to Seoul in 1915. She was trained as a Kisaeng from a young age with the stage name "Geumjuk" (금죽). After her relocation to Seoul in 1915, she became affiliated with major Gwonbeon or Kisaeng Guilds, including Daejeong Gwonbeon and Hannam Gwonbeon.

As a performer, Chung was known for her skill in Gayageum, traditional singing, and board games such as baduk (go). Her first public performances were in Daegu after being noticed at local events.

Cultural Influences

Chung's youth coincided with a trend of horse riding among elite Kisaeng in the 1910s which was viewed as both a display of status as well as a subtle challenge to gender norms. She mentioned how her happiest memory as a teenager was riding horses at the age of seventeen. She was also influenced by imported silent films featuring adventurous women like The Broken Coin 1915 (released in Korea as Myeonggeum) and the novel, Patriotic Lady 1907 (애국부인전). She later stated that she wanted Korean women to view such works because they inspired courage and a sense of possibility.

March 1st Movement and political awakening

Chung's participation in the 1919 demonstrations in Seoul influenced her shift toward nationalism and socialism. She witnessed and joined the March 1st Independence Movement of 1919, describing the experience as both a nationalist and personal turning point, opening a rare moment in which Kisaeng could appear as political subjects. The shock of state repression and the collective energy of the protests pushed Chung to abandon her work as a Kisaeng and pursue nationalist and social activism.

Chung stopped performing and turned down offers to return to the arts, including a Gayageum teaching position at Ewha Women's University. In an attempt to sever ties with the Kisaeng profession and to reposition herself as a political activist rather than an entertainer, she also began using her given name, Chil-sung, rather than her stage name Geumjuk.

== Education and intellectual formation ==
Study in Tokyo

Chung's intellectual development began with two periods of study in Tokyo during the early 1920s. Her first stay began in 1922, where she first attended an English and typing institute, which introduced her to clerical skills and modern office work. Motivated by the political climate that followed the March 1st movement, she sought practical training that would help her participate in movements more effectively and support herself.

During her stay, she began to read socialist literature, participated in student study circles, attended public lectures, and joined discussions among Korean students. These experiences helped shift her political perspective towards her understanding of structure within class and gender inequality.

In March 1925, she returned to Tokyo and enrolled at the Tokyo Women's Technical School, specializing in sewing and advanced textile techniques.This skill later became a significant feature in her political activities, as she relied on textile work both as a means of economic survival as well as a tool for educating working women.

While in Tokyo, she participated in socialist rallies and deepened her engagement with Marxist feminist ideas. She was especially influenced by August Bebel’s Woman and Socialism 1891 (often cited in Korea as Theory of Women), which described woman as "the first human being to perform the labor of a slave". She also encountered the writings of Japanese socialist feminist Yamakawa Kikue, whose labor-oriented approach to women's emancipation would shape Chung's own views. Chung also participated in publishing the socialist journal Rosa Luxemburg in Tokyo, which contained Korean translations of Yamakawa's writings and was aimed at students and workers in both Japan and Korea. Through this, she developed skills in editing, translation, and political education.

By the time she returned to Korea in late 1925, Chung developed a class-centered feminist perspective that emphasized economic independence, labor exploitation, and the structural nature of women's oppression.

== Samwolhoe (Society of March) and Theories of Women's Liberation ==
During her second stay in Tokyo in 1925, Chung joined Samwolhoe (삼월회, "Society of March"), a circle of Korean women students with socialist ideals. Following her experiences in Japan, she brought her class-centered feminist perspective to the group. Many members came from the Gyeongsang region, reflecting Chung's own regional background.

In January 1926, she published the essay What Is a New Woman? (Sin yeoseongiran muotinga) in the newspaper Chosŏn Ilbo. In this article, she criticized the image of the "New Woman" as a fashionable urban intellectual and instead, redefined it as a proletarian laborer working in tobacco factories, silk-reeling mills, and textile plants. She argued that working women who woke before dawn and endured long shifts under harsh conditions were the actual vanguard of women's liberation, in contrast to upper-class women who remained dependent on male income.

Chung had a different perspective from many liberal feminists of the period. While they often emphasized women's education and professional opportunities, she believed that class position and direct economic exploitation determined who could lead a genuine women's movement. Her focus on economic survival, gendered labor burdens, and household responsibilities reflected both her personal experiences and her observations of working women's conditions. Through Samwolhoe, Chung articulated one of the earliest Korean formulations of labor-centered feminist thought, positioning working women at the core of the struggle for social and gender equality.

== Involvement in Geunuhoe ==
Founding of Geunuhoe

Chung was one of the core founding members of Geunuhoe, which was founded on May 27, 1927, in the auditorium of the Young Men's Christian Association (YMCA) in Seoul as a left-right coalition organization within the women’s movement. Chung was elected to the Central Executive Committee at the time of its establishment. She was also appointed to the Propaganda and Organization Department, where she worked with figures such as Chung Jong-myeong to conduct public lectures and organize local branches. From 1927 to 1929, she carried out lecture tours across the country, ranging from Pyongyang in the north to Jinju in the south. Her lectures often discussed the difficult circumstances of Korean women and introduced the aims of Geunuhoe. Her work as a public lecturer contributed to the creation of Geunuhoe branches in Daegu, Gyeongsang Province, Jinnampo, and Uiju, regions where Geunuhoe lacked a strong presence.The skills she had developed through earlier activism in Daegu and the wider Gyeongsang region supported the expansion of Geunuhoe branches and contributed to the growth of the women’s movement. As her reputation grew, she became recognized as a significant speaker and opinion leader within social movement circles. Newspapers and magazines invited her to comment on current issues, and she contributed statements to special features and messages for new publication launches as a representative of the women’s movement.

In July 1929, with the growing influence of socialist activists and organizers from regional backgrounds within Geunuhoe, Chung was elected Chair of the Central Executive Committee at the organization’s national conference. Her leadership allowed her to shape the organization’s overall direction. Under her tenure, Geunuhoe established the Labor and Peasant Women’s Department and the Publishing Department, shifting its focus toward women workers and women farmers. On May 10, 1929, the organization launched its official journal, Geunu, which was edited and published by Chung. In the magazine, she stressed solidarity with working-class women and highlighted the poverty and discrimination faced by women of the lower classes.

Dissolution of Geunuhoe

Geunuhoe provided an important institutional base through which Chung could pursue her approach to the women’s movement. As discussions about the organization’s dissolution grew, she differed from many of her colleagues. The prospect of disbandment became visible as a result of persistent colonial repression and divisions between left and right movements. Several socialist women left activism after marriage, and Chung lamented that her Geunuhoe comrades had abandoned the movement once they married. She withdrew from Geunuhoe in 1930 due to health issues, at a time when calls for dissolution had become dominant within socialist circles. Despite this trend, Chung argued that Geunuhoe should continue, citing the need to raise women’s consciousness and maintain educational work that addressed conditions in Korea.

Even after Geunuhoe was dissolved, she expressed strong attachment to the organization and to the colleagues with whom she had spent her youth. In a March 1, 1935 article in Samcheolli, she recalled passing the former Geunuhoe building in Jongno and holding back tears while remembering fellow activists such as Hwang Sin-deok, Heo Jeong-suk, and Ju Se-juk. After the organization disbanded, she opened Bunok Suyesa, an embroidery and handicraft workshop in Nakwon-dong, Seoul, where she taught embroidery, sewing and knitting throughout the 1930s as part of her continued commitment to vocational education.

== Proletarian Feminist Theory ==
Drawing on ideas from August Bebel’s Woman and Socialism and by the Japanese feminist Yamakawa Kikue, Chung developed a class-based feminist framework that centered on “proletarian women,” whom she viewed as possessing both class consciousness and revolutionary potential. She articulated this position in an editorial titled “What Is a New Woman,” published on January 4, 1926, in The Chosun Ilbo as a representative of the women students’ group Samwolhoe.

In this article, Chung argued that prevailing images of the New Woman continued to exhibit traces of feudal and patriarchal values. She noted that even discourses that proposed modern models of womanhood did not fully break away from expectations such as obedience within the household, which she viewed as a fundamental limitation. She argued that the women capable of achieving genuine liberation were proletarian women who rejected the irrational structures of capitalism.

To illustrate this view, Chung contrasted her understanding of the New Woman with the fashionable urban women seen along Jongno, including those who had studied abroad, those educated at prestigious schools, and those who embraced consumer culture. She described these figures as products of late capitalist society. In contrast, she identified the genuine New Woman as the woman worker found in tobacco, brewery, and textile factories. Chung wrote that the worker who began her day at dawn and continued despite exhaustion embodied the discipline and effort required to create a new social order, and that her fatigue, tears and labor signaled the beginnings of social change.

Chung reiterated these ideas in a 1931 interview with the magazine Donggwang, in which she presented women workers in industrial factories as the model of the New Woman, rather than the “modern girl,” the foreign-educated elite, or women grounded in Christian values. She argued that women’s liberation under Japanese colonial rule required overcoming multiple layers of oppression, including feudal discrimination, patriarchal male authority, and the repressive structures of imperial rule and capitalism. For Chung, the subjects capable of confronting and transforming these structures were proletarian women workers who could break with feudal traditions and challenge colonial and capitalist systems.

However, women workers’ participation in labor activism was limited at the time. Although the number of women employed in tobacco, brewery, and textile industries increased significantly during the 1920s and 1930s, strikes led by women accounted for less than one-thirtieth of all labor actions. In response, Chung emphasized the need to raise class consciousness among women workers and supported educational efforts aimed at enlightening proletarian women. Through literacy campaigns and related activities, she sought to raise awareness among working-class women living under difficult conditions and to promote their gradual development as independent social actors.

== Later Life ==
Chung’s political activities faced severe restrictions after the early 1930s due to intensified Japanese police repression. Chung was arrested multiple times between 1929 and 1930, as she was detained in August 1929 and again in late September 1929 and January 1930. Most of the arrests were linked to the investigation of the nationalist-socialist coalition Singanhoe.

During this period, Chung strategically focused on self-support and sustained long-term educational work. She had previously founded the Korean Women’s Vocational Society in 1928, which aimed not only at women’s enlightenment but also at elevating their social status. Politically, she participated as an elected member of the dissolution committee for Singanhoe in 1931. After she withdrew from organizations such as the Geunuhoe, she continued her preference for long-term organization and worked to support herself rather than engage in radical mobilization, including by running a handicraft shop or working as a manager at the Sampho Gold Mine distribution office.

After Korea's liberation in 1945, Chung quickly resumed her political leadership role in the South. She joined the Communist Party of Korea (North Gyeongsang branch) and was appointed Head of the Women’s Bureau. Between 1945 and 1946, she served as a Central Committee member of both the Korean Women's General Federation and the South Korean Women’s League. However, in 1948, she moved to North Korea after being elected as a deputy to the 1st Supreme People’s Assembly at the Haeju congress. She later became a Central Committee member of the Korean Democratic Women's Union in September 1948. By 1955, she held the position of Vice-Chair of the Korean National Committee for the Defense of Peace. In 1956, she became a candidate member of the Central Committee of the Workers’ Party of Korea. In 1957, she served as Vice-Chair of the Korean Democratic Women's Union and was again elected as a deputy to the Supreme People’s Assembly representing North Pyongang. Despite her prominence, documentation of her final years is limited, as is her death. No officially verified records exist regarding the circumstances of her death. Some scholars state that she was executed during the August faction incident in 1958, yet the widely accepted view is that she died that year, with the exact cause of her death remaining unconfirmed.

== Bibliography ==
Journals

1. Park, Sun-sub. 2017. 1920~30년대 정칠성의 사회주의운동과 여성해방론 (Jeong, Chil-seong`s Socialism and Theory of Women`s Liberation in the 1920s~30s). 여성과 역사, 26(0), 245-271. https://kiss.kstudy.com/Detail/Ar?key=3531493
  - This peer-reviewed journal is about Chung Chil-seong's role as a socialist feminist activist in 1920s Korea.
2. Park, Sun-sub. 2019. [독립운동가열전] 정칠성 - 여성노동자를 대변한 근우회의 리더 (Chung Chil-sung in the Biographies of Independence Activists - A Geunuhoe Leader Who Represented Women Workers). 내일을 여는 역사, 76, 134-143. https://www.dbpia.co.kr/journal/articleDetail?nodeId=NODE12090210
  - This peer-reviewed journal is about Chung's role in the creation and development of Geunuhoe.
3. Roh, Jiseung. 2016. Gender, Labor, Emotion and Moment of Political Awakening - A Study on Life and Activities of Female Socialist Chung Chil-sung. Cross-Cultural Studies, 43, 7-50. https://www.kci.go.kr/kciportal/ci/sereArticleSearch/ciSereArtiView.kci?sereArticleSearchBean.artiId=ART002119471
  - This peer-reviewed journal is about Chung's evolution from a kisaeng to a socialist feminist leader, showing how her background, political awakening, and activism shaped her theroy of women's liberation in 1920s Korea.
4. Roh, Jiseung. 2022. 사랑, 돌봄, 사적 영역의 변혁 가능성과 한계 - 식민지 시기 콜론타이즘의 유산들 (The Possibility of Revolution and Limitations of Love, Care, and Private Sphere - Legacies of the Kollontaism in the Colonial Era). 한국근대문학연구, 23(1), 151-187. https://www.dbpia.co.kr/journal/articleDetail?nodeId=NODE11059932
  - This peer-reviewed journal is about how socialist women in colonial Korea, especially Chung and Heo Jeong-suk adopted and practiced Kollontai's ideas on economic independence.

Books

1. Kang, Sungho. (2021). 혁명을 꿈꾼 독서가들 (Revolution-Dreaming Readers: A Cultural History of Taboo Book Reading). 오월의봄.
  - This book covers many people who dreamed of revolution under colonial oppression in Korea, and it includes a biographical section explaining Chung's life.
2. Kang, Mangil; Sung, Dae-kyung. (2014). 한국사회주의운동 인명사전 (Biographical Dictionary of the Korean Socialist Movement). Changbi Publishers.
  - This book provides biological entries on key figures in the Korean socialist movement, including Chung, offering historical background and context on their activism and ideological development.

Encyclopedias

1. 정칠성 (丁七星). (2025). Aks.ac.kr. https://encykorea.aks.ac.kr/Article/E0051038
  - This official encyclopedia entry is about Chung's life and political activities, covering her early activism, leadership in women’s and socialist organizations, arrests during Japanese rule, and her later political roles in North Korea.
