= Jung Hanmo =

Korean poet (1923–1991)

Jung Hanmo (Korean: 정한모; 1923–1991) was a Korean poet. The primary subject matter of his poems was the bleak reality after the Korean War but he wrote poems representing his love for life and hope for the future. He taught Korean literature in universities for a long time, leaving many achievements as a scholar. When he was the Minister of Culture and Public Information in 1988, he decisively carried out the lifting of the ban on around 100 writers who had defected or had been kidnapped to North Korea.

== Biography ==
He was born in 1923 in Buyeo, South Chungcheong Province. He spent his childhood with his father absent, living with his grandmother and mother. After graduating from elementary school, he went to a commercial school in Osaka, Japan. During that time, he immerged into poems written by prestigious poets such as Takuboku Ishikawa and Tōson Shimazaki, preparing himself to be a poet. Upon hearing the news of his father's death in 1941, he rushed back to Korea. In 1944, he was drafted by force to work at an aircraft factory in Nagoya, and returned after Korea's Liberation from Japan.

== Debut ==
By publishing "Gwihyangsipyeon (귀향시편 Poetry of Coming Back to Hometown)" in Baekmaek (White Pulse), a literary coterie magazine, he debuted as a poet in 1945. In 1947, he was admitted by a university to major in Korean literature. At that time, he organized a literature community named Jumak (meaning a tavern) with Jeon Kwangyong, Chung Hansook, and Jeon Yeongkyeong, but they scattered upon the outbreak of the Korean War in 1950. During the war, he taught at a high school, and after the war was over, he met with them again to officially debut, and the resulting poem, "Myeolip (멸입 Disappearing)" won the annual spring literary contest in 1955. He began to receive attention while publishing collections of poems, titled Kaoseuui sajok (카오스의 사족 Chaos's Unnecessary Comments; 1958), and Yeobaekeul wihan seojung (여백을 위한 서정 Lyric for Space; 1959).

== Research on Korean literature and other activities ==
He left behind many achievements as a researcher on Korean literature while he was a professor of Korean literature at Seoul National University from 1958 until 1988. The most representative research is Munchero bon dongingwa hyoseok (문체로 본 동인과 효석 "Understanding Dongin and Hyoseok from Their Writing Style") and Kimyeongrangron (김영랑론 "Theory on Kim Yeongrang"). In addition, his research on them and other poetry theories were published as books such as Hyeondaejakkayeongu (현대작가연구 Research on Modern Writers; 1959) and Hankukhyeondaesihaksa (한국현대시학사 History of Modern Korean Poetry; 1974).

In 1988, when he was about to retire from his professorship, he was appointed as the Minister of Culture and Public Information under the Roh Taewoo administration. He served the position only for 10 months, but he made a remarkable accomplishment in 1988, with Seoul Olympics approaching, by lifting the ban on works by 100 writers who had defected or had been kidnapped to North Korea. It was said that he was so passionate for complete Korean literature including literature of the two Koreas that he taught poems by North Korean poets without revealing their names during his lecture. Thanks to his achievement of lifting the ban in 1988, it became possible to explore more works by previously banned writers, allowing Korean literary history to be newly written.

== Writing ==
His poems are characterized by his advocacy for humanism and admiration for life. Kaoseuui sajok (Chaos's Unnecessary Comments; 1958) depicts chaotic life after the Korean War. "Prangkad (프랑카아드 Placard)" describes the situation of the time by saying "shabby clothes like abandoned history/over the roof where war-weariness overflowed/yet another a thirsty cry resonated." In "Kogaemeorieseo (고개머리에서 On the Ridge)," people who wander around to seek a way to make a living are compared to refugees. This way, the writer expresses his frustration toward the dismal reality, but he never gives up on his hope for the provision of nature and life. In Baramkwa hamkke salaon sewol (바람과 함께 살아온 세월 Years When I Lived with Wind), he reveals his belief that new life can always be created even in despair, saying "There is new life starting to sprout as if it was inevitable."

His passion toward life becomes the theme of his poems later on. However, unlike the previous works where he dealt with wounds and pains caused by the war, Agaui bang (아가의 방 A Baby's Room; 1970) more clearly describes the future-oriented mind. In the preface, he says, "The baby was waiting quietly/returning at the end of the long passageway/the sound of light becoming an arrow/the baby was waiting quietly/returning at the end of the long passageway/the sound of light becoming an arrow/the door in front of me/finally was opening." The baby represents people who are waiting for light that can eliminate the darkness. On the other hand, the baby in Nabiui yeohaeng (나비의 여행 "Journey of a Butterfly") sets off on a journey with an innocent dream but returns, tired after he has gone through hardships and difficulties. Fragile yet cradling a primal vitality, the baby represents people who never stop advancing into the future no matter how miserable the reality is. Jung presents the "baby's room" that is clearly contrasted with the harsh reality, hoping to restore the affection for people and respect for life.

In Saebyek (새벽 Dawn; 1975), his mind for the future is described in a form of historical consciousness. The phrase in "Dawn 7," "the terror of darkness/toward the thick wall/sound of crying/like an iron fist/to strike a blow/staking everything one has" expresses his mind and hope for the future based on his criticism of the contradictions and irrationalities of reality. On the other hand, he also scrutinizes the meaning of the mother as a being that sustains life. "Mother 1" describes a mother as a "faucet of life" and a "pillar of our family." In the modern society, the importance of mother's love has faded away but the poet highlights his belief that one can fulfill one's life on the basis of motherly love and a stable family order.

== Works ==
=== Complete works ===
- 《정한모 시전집》 1·2, 포엠토피아, 2001 / Jeonghanmo sijeonjip (The Complete Poetry of Jung Hanmo) Vol. 1 and 2, Poemtopia, 2001.

=== Anthology ===
- 《나비의 여행》, 현대문학사, 1983 / Nabiui yeohaeng (Journey of a Butterfly), Hyeondaemunhaksa, 1983.
- 《사랑 시편》, 고려원, 1983 / Sarang sipyeon (Collection of Love Poems), Goryeowon, 1983.
- 《내 유년의 하늘엔》, 미래사, 1991 / Nae yunueonui haneulen (In the Sky When I Was Young), Miraesa, 1991.
- 송영호 편, 《정한모 시선》, 지식을만드는지식, 2014 / Jeonghanmo siseon (Selected Poems of Jung Hanmo) by Song Yeongho, Jimanji, 2014.

=== Works ===
- 《카오스의 사족(蛇足)》, 범조사, 1958 / Kaoseuui sajok (Chaos's Unnecessary Comments), Beomjosa, 1958.
- 《여백을 위한 서정》, 신구문화사, 1959 / Yeobaekeul wihan seojung (Lyric for Space), Singumunhwasa, 1959
- 《아가의 방》, 문원사, 1970 / Agaui bang (A Baby's Room), Munwonsa, 1970.
- 《새벽》, 일지사, 1975 / Saebyek (Dawn), Iljisa, 1975.
- 《아가의 방 별사(別詞)》, 문학예술사, 1983 / Agaui bang byeolsa (A Baby's Room Appendix), Munhakyesulsa, 1983.
- 《원점에 서서》, 문학사상사, 1989 / Wonjeomeseoseo (Standing back to Square One), Munhaksasangsa, 1989.

=== Collection of essays ===
- 《바람과 함께 살아온 세월》, 문음사, 1983 / Baramkwa hamkke salaon sewol (Years When I Lived with Wind), Muneumsa, 1983

=== Research ===
- 《현대작가연구》, 범조사, 1959 / Hyeondae jakka yeongu (Research on Modern Writers), Beomjosa, 1959.
- 《현대시론》, 민중서관, 1973 / Hyeondae siron (Modern Poetry Theory), Minjungseokwan, 1973.
- 《한국현대시문학사》, 일지사, 1974 / Hankuk hyeondaesi munhaksa (Literary History of Korea Modern Poetry), Iljisa, 1974.
- 《한국현대시의 정수》, 서울대학교출판부, 1979 / Hankuk hyeondaesiui jeongsu (Essence of Korean Modern Poetry), Seoul National University Press, 1979.
- 《한국현대시의 현장》, 박영사, 1983 / Hankuk hyeondaesiui hyenjang (Scene of Korean Modern Poetry), Bakyeongsa, 1983.
- 《소월시의 정착과정연구》, 서울대학교출판부, 1983 / Sowolsiui jeongchakgwajeongyeongu (Research on Establishment of Sowol's Poetry) Seoul National University Press, 1983.

=== Comments ===
- 《혈의 누·은세계 외》, 정음사, 1955 / Hyeolui nu, eunsegye oe (Tears of Blood, Silver World and Others), Jeongeumsa, 1955.

=== Co-author ===
- 정한모 외, 《문학개론》, 청운출판사, 1964 / Jung Hanmo and others, Munhakgaeron (Introduction to Literature), Cheongun, 1964.
- 정한모·김용직, 《문학개설》, 박영사, 1973 / Jung Hanmo and Kim Yongjik, Munhakgaesoel (Literary Theories), Bakyeongsa, 1973.
- 정한모·김용직, 《한국현대시요람》, 박영사, 1974 / Jung Hanmo and Kim Yongjik, Hankukhyeondaesiyoram (Booklet of Korean Modern Poetry), Bakyeongsa, 1974.
- 정한모·정병욱, 《논문작성법》, 박영사, 1981 / Jung Hanmo and Jeong Byeonguk, Nonmunjakseongbeop (How to Write a Thesis), Bakyeongsa, 1981.

=== Compilation ===
- 《최남선 작품집》, 형설출판사, 1977 / Choinamseon jakpumjip (The Works of Choe Namseon), Hyeongseol, 1977.

=== Co-editorship ===
- 정한모 외, 《한국대표시평설》, 문학세계사, 1983 / Jung Hanmo and others, Hankukdaepyosipyeongseol (Review of the Representative Korean Poets), Munhaksegyesa, 1983.

== Awards ==
- 1971, Society of Korean Poets Award (A Baby's Room)
- 1983, Seoul Cultural Award
- 1987, National Academy of Arts Award
- 1990, Korean Literature Award
