= Jeong Do-sang =

South Korean novelist

- Born: January 3, 1960 (age 66); Hamyang County, South Gyeongsang Province, South Korea
- Writing career
- Language: Korean

- Korean name
- Hangul: 정도상
- RR: Jeong Dosang
- MR: Chŏng Tosang

Jeong Do-sang (Korean: 정도상; born January 3, 1960) is a South Korean novelist and children's author. Jeong debuted as a writer in 1987 with the short story "Our Winter." He has written collections such as l친구는 멀리 갔어도; Chinguneun meolli gatsseodo (Even though my friend went far), 실상사 (Spring at Silsangsa Temple), 모란시장 여자; Moransijang yeoja (The Woman at the Moran Market), and 찔레꽃 (Brier Rose). He has also written the novels 누망 (Faint Hope), 낙타; Nakta (The Camel), 은행나무 소년; Eunhaengnamu sonyeon (The Ginkgo Tree Boy), as well as the children’s novel 돌고래 파치노; Dolgorae pachino (Pachino the Dolphin).

Jeong won the 17th Danjae Literary Award for Faint Hope, the 25th Yosan Literary Prize for Brier Rose, and the 7th Beautiful Writer’s Award.

== Biography ==
Jeong Do-sang was born on January 3, 1960 in Macheon-myeon, Hamyang County, South Gyeongsang Province, South Korea. His father died when he was six. He moved to Seoul in 1971 and pursued studies while he worked various jobs such as a street peddler selling chewing gum, a newspaper boy, and taking on manual labor. He enrolled at the Department of German Language and Literature at Jeonbuk National University in 1981.

Jeong was imprisoned for his role in the Protest Against the Construction of the Peace Dam in 1986. In 1987, while serving his sentence in Jeonju Prison, he decided to begin writing. When he was released from prison, he worked at apartment construction sites while writing. Jeong won the Chonnam National University’s May Literature Award for his short story Our Winter (우리들의 겨울). Afterwards, he actively pursued his career as a writer.

In 2005, Jeong's fifteen-year-old son committed suicide. His son's suicide gave Jeong Do-sang great shock, and caused a literary change within him. These experiences were presumably deeply related to his later constant interest in the youth problem as well as his publication of young adult novels and children's books.

== Writing ==
As a Realist writer, Jeong lays out themes based on life experiences in his writing. His early works have realistic insights into how the state uses its great authority to destroy the lives of individuals. Particularly, in Chinguneun meolli gatsseodo (친구는 멀리 갔어도 Even though my friend went far), he portrays how a soldier that accidentally kills a superior officer becomes involved in a fabricated defection to North Korea, as well as a reforestation project. Jeong also realistically portrays violence within the military, making it an early representative work that widely spread his name among readers.

In terms of works after the 2000s, Jeong focused his literary interest on nomadism and the problem of refugees. Brier Rose (찔레꽃), a serialized novel, is about North Korean defectors and their journey, telling the process of escape and settlement. It realistically portrays the issue of division concerning South Korean society.

In the 2010 novel Nakta (낙타 The Camel), Jeong portrays the inner side of a protagonist. The protagonist faces inner loneliness via a journey through the Gobi Desert with his son, who died with only a short note. Nakta (낙타 The Camel) portrays how such scars of the protagonist are healed through friendships made with many people he meets during his travel.

== Works in translation ==
- Spring at the Silsanga Temple (English)

== Works in Korean ==
Short Story Collections

- Chinguneun meolli gatsseodo (친구는 멀리 갔어도 Even though my friend went far), Pulbit, 1988.
- Spring at Silsangsa Temple (실상사), Munhak Dongne, 2004.
- Moransijang yeoja (모란시장 여자 The Woman at the Moran Market), Changbi, 2005.
- Brier Rose (찔레꽃), 2008.

Novels

- Yeolahopui jeolmang kkeut-e bureuneun hanaui sarangnore (열아홉의 절망 끝에 부르는 하나의 사랑노래 A Love Song at the End of My Desperation at Nineteen), Nokdu, 1990.
- Geudaeyeo dasi mannal ttaekkaji (그대여 다시 만날 때까지 Until I Meet You Again), Pulbit, 1991.
- Geurigo naeili itda (그리고 내일이 있다 And Tomorrow Comes), Achim, 1992.
- Nalji anneumyeon gileul ilneunda (날지 않으면 길을 잃는다 If You Don't Fly, You Will Be Lost), Nokdu, 1994.
- Yeolae (열애; Passion), Prunsoop, 1995.
- Jisangui sigan (지상의 시간 Time on Earth), Hantteut, 1997.
- Pureun bang (푸른 방 The Blue Room), Hanwul, 2000.
- Geu yeoja jeonhyerin(그 여자 전혜린 That Woman Jeon Hyerin), Duri Media, 2002.
- Faint Hope (누망), Silcheon Munhaksa, 2003.
- Nakta (낙타 The Camel), Munhakdongne, 2010

Children's Novels

- Jirisan pyeonji (지리산 편지 Letter from Jirisan), Mirae M&B, 2001.
- Dolgorae pachino (돌고래 파치노 Pachino the Dolphin), Munhakdongneeorini, 2006.
- Jongihak (종이학 The Paper Crane), Naeinsaenguichaek, 2007.
- Appaui bimil (아빠의 비밀 Father's Secret), Naeinsaenguichaek, 2008.
- Bulgeun yuchaekkot (붉은 유채꽃 Red Rape Flowers), Pureunnamoo, 2009.
- Eunhaengnamu sonyeon (은행나무 소년 The Ginkgo Tree Boy), Changbi, 2012.
- Maeumoreulkkot (마음오를꽃 A Flower On My Mind), Jaeumgwamoeum, 2014.

== Awards ==
- 2003 17th Danjae Literary Award
- 2008 25th Yosan Literary Prize
- 2008 7th Beautiful Writer's Award
