= Jong Thae-yang =

North Korean diplomat

- Hangul: 정태양
- Hanja: 鄭泰洋
- RR: Jeong Taeyang
- MR: Chŏng T'aeyang

Jong Thae-yang (Korean: 정태양; Korean pronunciation: [tsʌŋ.tʰɛ.jaŋ]) is a North Korean diplomat. He currently serves as the deputy chief of the US Affairs Bureau of the Foreign Ministry. He has frequently been involved in international talks, including the Six Party Talks.

Jong has worked in various North Korean embassies in other countries, such as Uganda, Namibia.

== See also ==
- Foreign relations of North Korea
- Politics of North Korea
