= Chŏng Inji =

Korean Neo-Confucian scholar (1396–1478)

Chŏng Inji 정인지
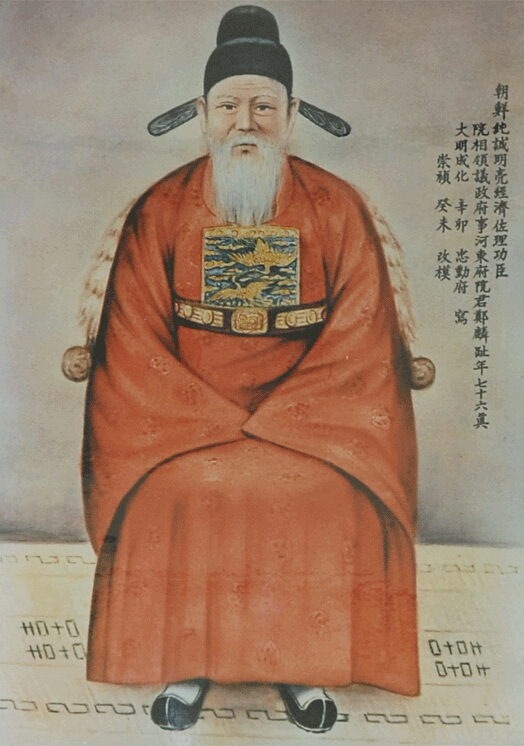
- Portrait of Chŏng Inji, ca. 1472

Chief State Councillor
- In office July 25, 1455 – January 11, 1459
- Preceded by: Yi Yu, Grand Prince Suyang
- Succeeded by: Jeong Chang-son

Left State Councillor
- In office November 11, 1453 – April 20, 1455
- Preceded by: Kim Chongsŏ
- Succeeded by: Han Hwak

Personal details
- Born: December 28, 1396 Hanseong-bu, Joseon
- Died: November 26, 1478 (aged 81) Hanseong-bu, Joseon

Korean name
- Hangul: 정인지
- Hanja: 鄭麟趾
- RR: Jeong Inji
- MR: Chŏng Inji

Art name
- Hangul: 학역재
- Hanja: 學易齋
- RR: Hakyeokjae
- MR: Hagyŏkchae

Courtesy name
- Hangul: 백저
- Hanja: 伯雎
- RR: Baekjeo
- MR: Paekchŏ

Posthumous name
- Hangul: 문성
- Hanja: 文成
- RR: Munseong
- MR: Munsŏng

Joseon Royal Title
- Hangul: 하동부원군
- Hanja: 河東府院君
- RR: Hadongbuwongun
- MR: Hadongbuwŏn'gun

Chŏng Inji (Korean: 정인지; Hanja: 鄭麟趾; December 28, 1396 – November 26, 1478) was a Korean Neo-Confucian scholar, historian, and politician who served as Vice Minister of Education or Deputy Chief Scholar (Head of Office for Special Advisors) during the reign of King Sejong the Great, Minister of Rites during the reign of King Munjong and Danjong, Left or Second State Councillor from 1453 to 1455 during the reign of King Danjong, and Chief State Councillor from 1455 to 1458 during the reign of King Sejo. He was nicknamed Hakyeokjae (학역재). He was from the Hadong Chŏng clan (하동 정씨; 河東 鄭氏)

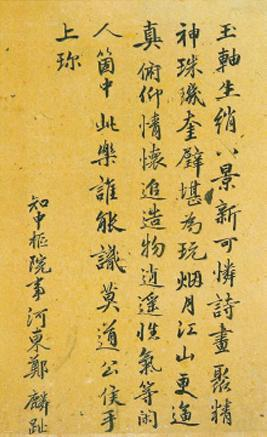
Letters of Chŏng Inji

He is perhaps best known for having written the postscript of the Hunmin Jeongeum Haerye, the commentary on and explanation of the native alphabet Hangeul invented by King Sejong in 1443. He also contributed to the Goryeo-sa, the official history of the Goryeo dynasty, and the Yongbi Eocheon-ga (용비어천가).

His second son, Chŏng Hyŏnjo, was married to Princess Uisuk, the second daughter of King Sejo of Joseon. His descendants would eventually have royal connections through their marriages.

== Books ==
- Hunminjeongeum
- Hunminjeongeum yehae (훈민정음예해; 訓民正音例解)
- Hagyeokjaejip (학역재집; 學易齋集)
- Yeokdae yeokbeop (역대역법; 歷代曆法)
- Goryeosa
- Goryeosa jeolyo (고려사절요; 高麗史節要)
- Yeokdae byeongyo (역대병요; 歷代兵要)
- Saryun ojip (사륜오집)
- Jachitonggam hunui (자치통감훈의; 資治通鑑訓義)
- Sejong sillok (세종실록; 世宗實錄)

== Family ==
- Father: Chŏng Hŭngin (정흥인; 鄭興仁; 1363–1436)
- Mother: Lady Chin of the Heungdeok Chin clan (정경부인 흥덕 진씨; 貞敬夫人 興德 陳氏; 1367–1437); married in 1387
- Wives and their children
  - Lady Cho of the Hanyang Cho clan (한양 조씨; 1400–1435); daughter of Jo Hu (조후, 趙侯; 1372–?)
  - Lady Yi of the Gyeongju Yi clan (정경부인 경주 이씨; 1417–?); second daughter of Yi Hyu (판한성부사 이휴, 李携; 1372–?)
    - Son - Chŏng Kwangjo (정광조; 鄭光祖; ?–1457)
    - Daughter - Lady Chŏng of the Hadong Chŏng clan
    - Son - Chŏng Hyŏnjo (1440 – 13 July 1504)
    - Son - Chŏng Sungjo (정숭조; 鄭崇祖; 1442 – 13 February 1503)
    - Daughter - Lady Chŏng of the Hadong Chŏng clan (1449–?)
    - Daughter - Lady Chŏng of the Hadong Chŏng clan (1450–?)
    - Son - Chŏng Kyŏngjo (정경조; 鄭敬祖; 1455 – July 1498)
    - Son - Chŏng Sangjo (정상조; 鄭尙祖; 1459–1491)

== In popular culture ==
=== Drama ===
- Portrayed by Jeong Seung-hyeon in the 1984–1985 MBC TV series 500 Years of Joseon: The Ume Tree in the Midst of the Snow
- Portrayed by Lee Shin-jae in the 1990 KBS TV series Dance Toward the Broken Heavens
- Portrayed by Han In-su in the 1994 KBS TV series Han Myeong-hoe
- Portrayed by Park Woong in the 1998–2000 KBS TV series The King and Queen
- Portrayed by Lee Jin-woo in the 2008 KBS TV series The Great King, Sejong
- Portrayed by Park Hyuk-kwon in the 2011 SBS TV series Deep Rooted Tree.
- Portrayed by Woo Sang-jeon in the 2011–2012 JTBC TV series Insu, The Queen Mother
- Portrayed by Jeong Eui-gap in the 2016 KBS1 TV series Jang Yeong-sil.

=== Film ===
- Portrayed by O Yeong-su in the play Tae in 1997 and 2007
- Portrayed by Lee Jin-bok in the 2012 film The Majesty's Spring

== See also ==
- Sejo of Joseon
- Sin Sukchu
- Han Myŏnghoe
- Han Hwak
- King Seonjo of Joseon
