= Yuuri Rukawa =

Japanese child actress

- 流川 ゆうり
- Born: May 29, 1999 (age 27); Tokyo, Japan
- Occupations: Child actress, model
- Years active: 2007–
- Agent: Nextage

Yuuri Rukawa (流川 ゆうり, Rukawa Yūri; born May 29, 1999, in Tokyo, Japan) is a Japanese model. Previously a child actress represented by Nextage, Rukawa was once a member of Charm Kids.

== Filmography ==
=== TV series ===
Year	Title	Network	Notes
2009	Gokujō!! Mecha Mote Iinchō	TV Tokyo	
2010	Himitsu no Chikarando	NHK	Regular appearances

=== Magazines ===
Title	Notes
Primary School Model Audition Grand Prix	
Chara Pafe	
