= Young-jae Jung =

South Korean ballet dancer (born 1984)

- Born: 1984 (age 41–42)
- Occupation: Ballet dancer
- Career
- Current group: Korean National Ballet
- Former groups: Universal Ballet; English National Ballet

Korean name
- Hangul: 정영재
- RR: Jeong Yeongjae
- MR: Chŏng Yŏngjae

Young-jae Jung (born 1984) is a South Korean ballet dancer. He is currently a member of the Korea National Ballet where he is a soloist.

Jung graduated from Ulan Ude State Ballet School, Russia in 2001 and also attended the Bolshoi Ballet Academy. After graduating from Korea National University of Arts, he danced at Universal Ballet.

In 2008, he was a member of corps de ballet at the English National Ballet (ENB) for two years. At ENB, he was taught by Anthony Dowson (a former principal dancer at the Royal Ballet) and played leading roles in the ENB director Wayne Eagling's numerous works such as The Snow Queen, Coppélia, Manon, The Sleeping Beauty and The Nutcracker.

In July 2009 he joined the Korea National Ballet.

At the 11th "Arabesque" International Ballet Competition in 2010, he received a perfect score from all the judges for the first time in the history of the competition to win the Grand Prix and the Best Couple Prize.

== List of Awards ==
- 2003 First Place for a junior at the Competition hosted by the Gwangju Ballet Association
- 2005 Finalist at the Nagoya International Ballet Competition
- 2006 First Place (pas de deux) at the Gwangju International Ballet Competition
- 2007 Grand Prix and Prize awarded by the Minister of Culture and Tourism at Seoul International Dance Competition
- 2007 Lefkowitz Award for dancers with "special attributes" at the New York International Ballet Competition
- 2009 Principal Prize at the 46th Dance Competition for Rookies
- 2010 Grand Prix and Best Couple Prize at the 11th "Arabesque" International Ballet Competition
