= Se-rim Moon =

South Korean model (born 1982)

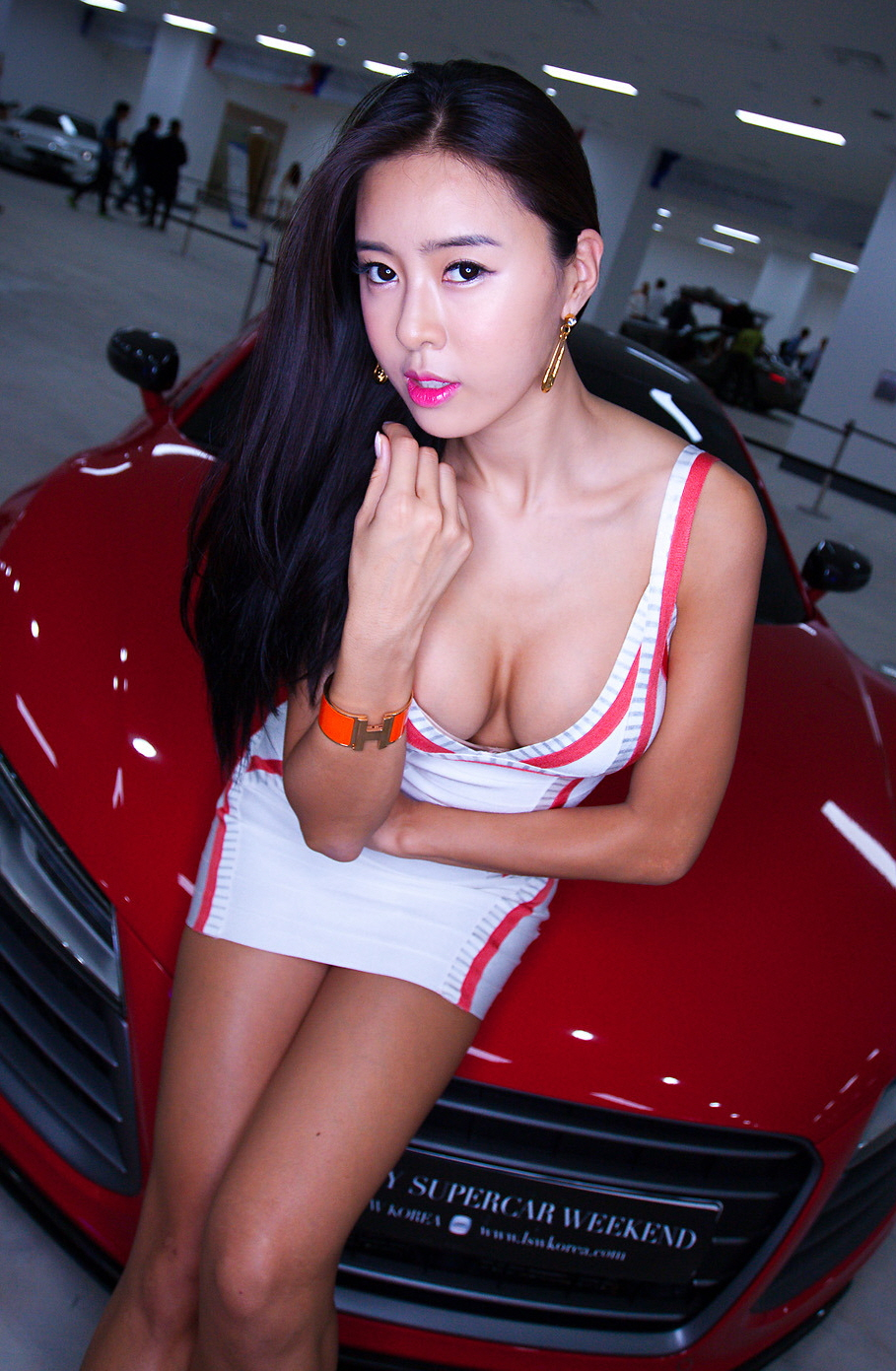
- Serim in 2014.
- Born: March 12, 1982 (age 44)
- Occupations: grid girl, spokesperson

Se-rim Moon (born March 12, 1982) is a South Korean grid girl and fashion model.

== Life and career ==
Before modelling, Serim worked as a graphic designer for a large animation company. She identifies as Christian.

In 2015, when she was a national competitor of the Korea Bodybuilding Association, Se-rim ranked third in the female bikini category of 168 cm or more, and first place in the fitness bikini category 1m70 or more at the NGC National Fitness Championships. She is 1m74 tall, weighing 53 kg

In 2018, Moon worked as a ring girl for the Double G matches held at the Janchung Gymnasium in Seoul.

In December 2022, she won the Global Influencer Award at the 1st Believer Creator Awards, held at the 2022 Incheon International One-person Media Festival.

In 2023, Serim works as an executive of the Korea Racing Model Group, and was named an Andtree Angel (representative for a local charitable works organization).

=== Television work ===
Appearing on the SBS TV show Stockings in 2016, Moon told a story about meeting her future husband (a Chinese millionaire) while working at the 2014 Shanghai Motor Show through an acquaintance; saying that they only spoke briefly. She saw him again a few months later at the Busan Motor Show; he went to the Show specifically to see her. (For the television show, four out of five panelists were telling the truth; one was not. It was later revealed that Moon's story was a fib, and that she was single). She was also a reenactment actor in the Maeil Broadcasting Network program "Real Situation".

=== AVING modeling career ===
- 2014 – Model for G-Star NHN Entertainment
- 2013 – Seoul International Autoshow, model for Hyundai Motors
- 2011 – Asian Models Association Steering Committee

=== Racing model career ===
- 2013 – Korean Speed Festival – Model for Hyundai Motors

== Awards ==
- 2016 – 2016 ASIA MODEL FESTIVAL Korea Racing Model Show and Awards Sports Racing Model Awards
- 2015 – NFC National Fitness Championship Women's Bikini Fitness Division Champion
- 2010 – Special Research Award Jett Girl Supermodel Korea
- 2010 – Jett Girl Supermodel Korea Search Star Award
- 2009 – Bronze Award, at the second Rookie Racing Model Contest
- 2008 – Environmental Model Contest Winner
