= Chung Yangmo =

South Korean art historian (born 1934)

- Born: 1934 (age 91–92)
- Education: Seoul National University
- Occupation: Art historian
- Employers: Gyeongju National Museum; National Museum of Korea; Cultural Heritage Administration of Korea

Korean name
- Hangul: 정양모
- Hanja: 鄭良謨
- RR: Jeong Yangmo
- MR: Chŏng Yangmo

Chung Yangmo (Korean: 정양모; born 1934) is a South Korean art historian, known for his expertise in Korean ceramics.

== Personal life ==
Chung Yangmo was born in 1934 as the fourth and final son of Jeong In-bo, a historian and author during the Japanese colonial period. He is an admirer of the works of Joseon Dynasty landscape painter Jeong Seon. He received his B.S. degree in history from Seoul National University in 1958.

Chung's family was divided by the Korean War: his father and elder sister Chung Kyung-wan were taken to North Korea in 1950. In 2004 he received news that Kyung-wan was still alive. One of his other elder sisters, Chung Yang-wan, became a scholar of Korean literature with the Academy of Korean Studies. He met the woman who would become his wife, Ewha Womans University student Lee Jung-won (이중원; 李仲瑗), in 1964 when she was preparing to write her thesis on pottery. He gave up on his plans to study abroad in order to marry her in 1967, and the couple went on to have two sons and a daughter.

Chung is a close friend of ceramicist Min Young-ki (민영기; 閔泳麒) and painter Chun Sung-woo (전성우; 全筬雨). In 1998, Min and Chun jointly made a Buncheong-style stoneware bowl for him, which is on display at the Asian Art Museum of San Francisco.

== Career ==
Chung began his career in the National Museum of Korea in 1962. For much of his early career he worked under Choi Sun-u, then one of the country's foremost experts on Korean ceramics. In 1963, while holding the position of assistant researcher in the art department of the museum, he participated in fieldwork led by Choi in Yangju, and discovered a kiln from the late Goryeo Dynasty in a village near Dobongsan.

From 1984 to 1986, Chung served as director of the Gyeongju National Museum. He went on to become the director of the National Museum of Korea, serving from 1993 to 1999. In May 2003, he was appointed as the new commissioner of the Cultural Heritage Administration of Korea's Cultural Properties Commission. He served in that position until 2005, when he was succeeded by Seoul National University professor Ahn Hwi-joon (안휘준; 安輝濬).

== Awards and honours ==
In 2005, Chung received the Silver Crown of the Order of Cultural Merit from the government of South Korea. In 2013 his fellow scholars published a Festschrift in his honour to celebrate his eightieth year of life (in East Asian age reckoning).

== Exhibitions ==
- 1978–1980 Exhibition Director of '5000 Years of Korean Art', Asian Art Museum of San Francisco, Cleveland Museum of Art, Museum of Fine Arts, Boston, Metropolitan Museum of Art
- 1982–1984 Exhibition Director of 'Ancient Korean Culture', British Museum and Munich Stadtmuseum
- 1990–1993 Exhibition Director of '18th Century', Smithsonian Institution (Arthur M. Sackler Gallery)
- 1998 General Manager of Korean Pavilion, Metropolitan Museum of Art

== Publications ==
- Smith, Judith G. (coordinating editor); Chung Yang-mo; Ahn Hwi-joon; Yi Sŏng-mi; Kim Lena; Kim Hongnam; Pak Youngsook (1998). Arts of Korea (3rd printing ed.). New York: Metropolitan Museum of Art. ISBN 9780870998508.
- 정양모 [Chung Yangmo] (1 March 1991). 한국의 도자기 [Ceramics in Korea]. South Korea: 문예출판사 [Munyea]. ISBN 9788931000009.

== See also ==
- Korean art
