= Chung Heesun =

South Korean pharmacologist and forensic scientist

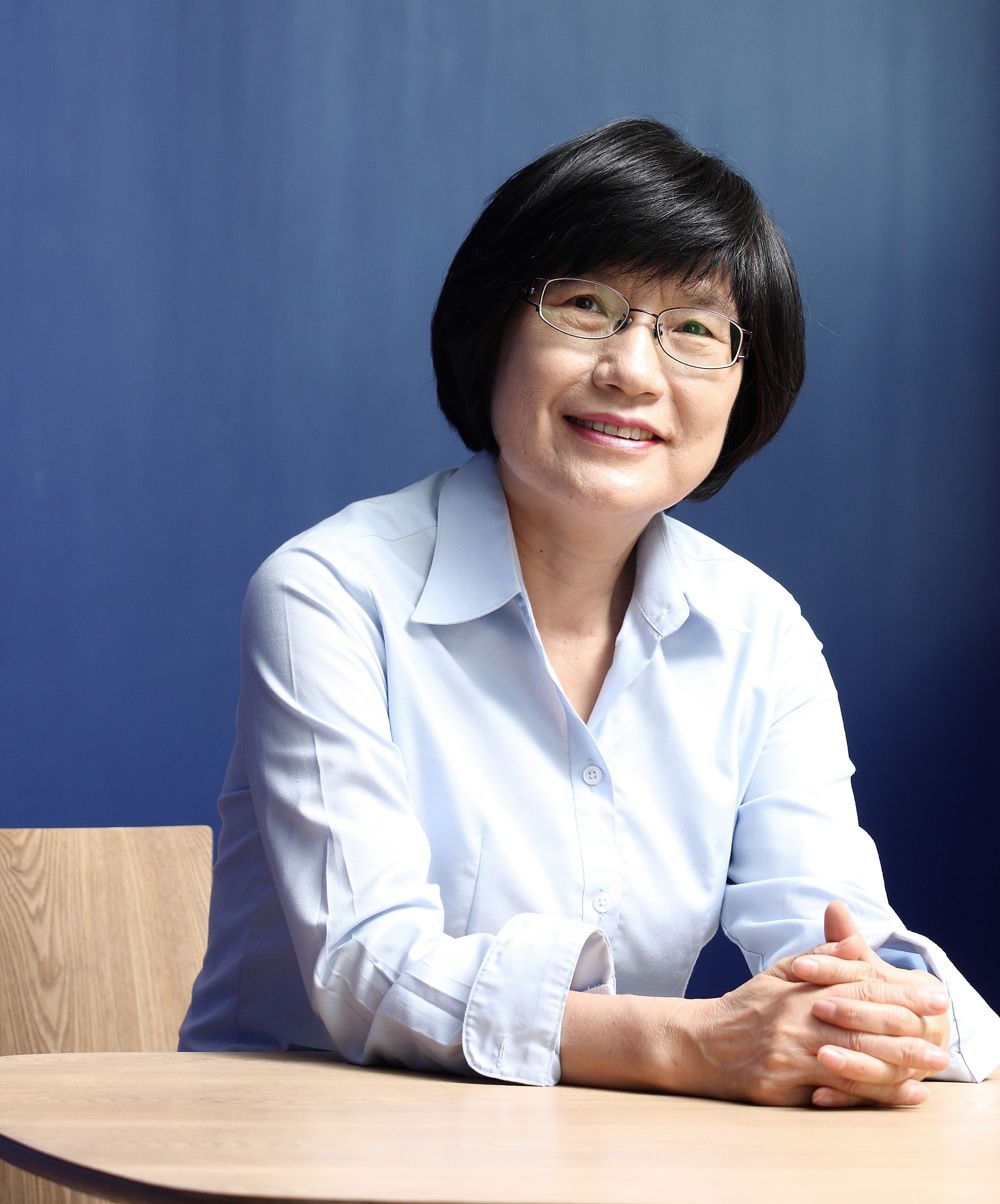
Chung in 2013

Chung Heesun (Korean: 정희선, born 1955) is a South Korean forensic scientist and forensic toxicologist. She was the first female President of the National Forensic Service of Korea (formerly the National Institute of Scientific Investigation). She is a distinguished professor in the Department of Forensic Science at Sungkyunkwan University. Her research has focused on forensic toxicology, the analysis of abused drugs in biological samples, and the development of detection kits for drug-facilitated crimes.

== Education ==
Chung studied pharmacy at Sookmyung Women's University, earning a bachelor's degree in 1978, a master's degree in hygienic pharmacy in 1980, and a Ph.D. in hygienic pharmacy in 1987. Subsequently, she was awarded a Foreign and Commonwealth Office Scholarship from the United Kingdom government for postdoctoral study at King's College London.

== Career ==
Chung worked at South Korea's National Forensic Service, formerly the National Institute of Scientific Investigation. Her positions there included Head of the Department of Forensic Science, Director of the Narcotics Analysis Division, and Director of Drug and Toxicology. She was the first woman to serve as Director General of the agency.

From 2013 to 2020, Chung was dean and professor of the Graduate School of Analytical Science and Technology at Chungnam National University. In 2020, she became a distinguished professor at Sungkyunkwan University.

From 2011 to 2014, Chung served as the 22nd President of the International Association of Forensic Sciences From 2014 to 2017, she served as the 13th President of The International Association of Forensic Toxicologists (TIAFT) and was a member of its executive board from 2002 to 2022.She is also a member of TIAFT's Ethics Committee. Since 2019, she has served as a member of the International Panel of Forensic Experts for the United Nations Office on Drugs and Crime.

== Research ==
Chung's research focuses on forensic toxicology, including the analysis of abused drugs in biological fluids and the development of detection kits for drug-facilitated crimes. Her publications include studies on methamphetamine and amphetamine in hair, ketamine and norketamine in urine, urine multi-drug screening, and new psychoactive substances. Chung also published on drug trends and forensic monitoring systems. In a 2005 article in the Bulletin on Narcotics, she described the role of drug testing as an early warning programme in South Korea. She has also coauthored studies on the prevalence of new psychoactive substances in Northeast Asia, cannabis detection in oral fluid, precursor chemicals used in methamphetamine manufacture, and impurities in illicit methamphetamine.

== Awards ==
Chung has received a medal for distinguished service from the South Korean government, a medal for excellence in forensic science from the Mongolian government, and the Most Outstanding Woman Scientist award from the Korean Ministry of Science and Technology. In 2014, she was appointed an Honorary Commander of the Order of the British Empire for her work strengthening scientific and educational ties between the United Kingdom and South Korea. In 2022, The International Association of Forensic Toxicologists awarded her the Alan Curry Award, its highest distinction.
