= Mimi Jung =

South Korean-American artist

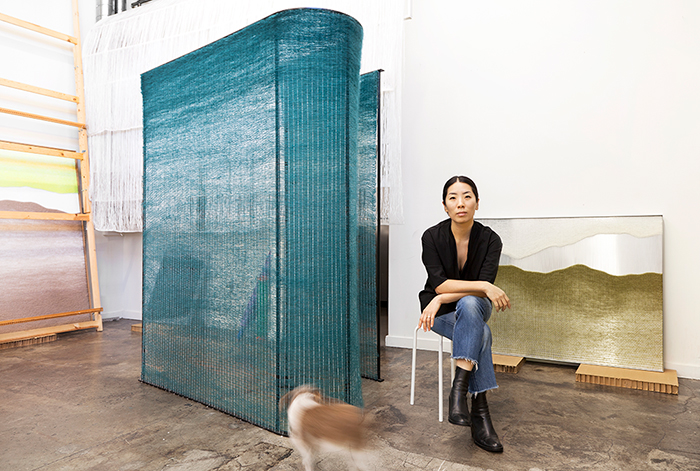
- Born: 1981 (age 44–45); Seoul, South Korea
- Known for: Sculpture; tapestry

Mimi Jung (born 1981) is a Los Angeles–based South Korean artist whose practice centers on handwoven tapestry and sculpture.

== Biography ==
Mimi Jung was born in Seoul, South Korea. She received a BFA from Cooper Union and attended HGK Basel and Städelschule for postgraduate studies. In 2019, Mimi created an art program for children impacted by foster care in partnership with Happy Trails for Kids. She has mounted exhibitions throughout the United States including Chamber gallery, Nina Johnson gallery, and Carvalho Park gallery. Her work has also been exhibited in Les Gens Heureux in Copenhagen, Collectible in Brussels, Somerset House in London, and the National Gallery of Victoria in Melbourne.

== Selected exhibitions ==
- Carvalho Park Gallery, New York, United States, History Lessons: Delphine Hennelly + Mimi Jung, February 8–March 31, 2019
- National Gallery of Victoria, Melbourne, Australia Design Storytellers, Broached Commissions, August 17–February 1, 2018
- Somerset House + Kvadrat, London, United Kingdom, My Canvas, September 18–21, 2018

== Awards ==
- Arts/Industry Residency, John Michael Kohler Arts Center, Kohler, Wisconsin, 2020
