= Chong Moon-kyong =

South Korean volleyball player (born 1950)

Chung Moon-kyung

Personal information
- Nationality: South Korean
- Born: March 1, 1950 (age 76); Seoul, South Korea
- Height: 176 cm (5 ft 9 in)
- Weight: 65 kg (143 lb)

- Chong Moon-kyong
- Hangul: 정문경
- Hanja: 鄭文慶
- RR: Jeong Mungyeong
- MR: Chŏng Mun'gyŏng

Chung Moon-kyung (born 1 March 1950) is a South Korean former volleyball player who competed in the 1976 Summer Olympics.
