= Chŏng Hyŏnjo =

Korean politician (1440–1504)

- Hangul: 정현조
- Hanja: 鄭顯祖
- RR: Jeong Hyeonjo
- MR: Chŏng Hyŏnjo

Courtesy name
- Hangul: 효중
- Hanja: 孝仲
- RR: Hyojung
- MR: Hyojung

Posthumous name
- Hangul: 편정
- Hanja: 褊玎
- RR: Pyeonjeong
- MR: P'yŏnjŏng

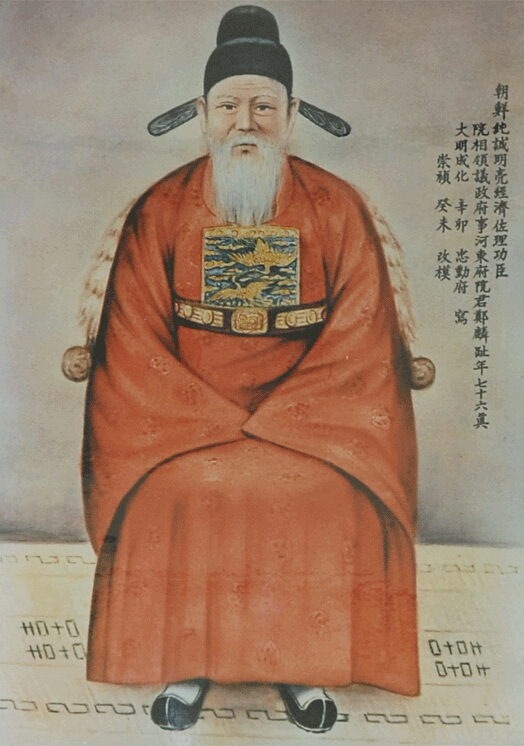

Chŏng Hyŏnjo (Korean: 정현조; Hanja: 鄭顯組, 1440–1504) was a politician and writer during Korea's Joseon Dynasty. He was the son-in-law of the Joseon Dynasty's 7th King Sejo of Joseon, and the son of Chŏng Inji.

His first wife was Princess Uisuk, King Sejo of Joseon's younger daughter. His second wife was Lady Yi, General Yi Ching's daughter.

== See also ==
- Sejo of Joseon
- Chŏng Inji
- Han Myŏnghoe
