= Jeong Kwang-il =

North Korean defector

Jeong Kwang-il (Korean: 정광일) is a North Korean defector and former political prisoner who currently resides in South Korea and actively smuggles films, soap operas, and entertainment on DVDs and USB thumb drives (some of which contain an offline copy of Wikipedia) into North Korea.
