= Chung Jae-hun (baseball, born 1981) =

South Korean baseball player

- Hangul: 정재훈
- Hanja: 鄭載訓
- RR: Jeong Jaehun
- MR: Chŏng Chaehun

Chung Jae-hun (Korean: 정재훈; born May 6, 1981, in Seoul) is a former South Korean pitcher who plays for the Doosan Bears in the KBO League.

== Education ==
- Dankook University
- Seoul Baemyung High School
- Seoul Baemyung Middle School
- Seoul Joongdae Elementary School
