= Jung Yu-ri =

South Korean singer

Jung Yuri
- Also known as: Yuri; AB
- Born: Jung Yuri; December 6, 1984 (age 41); Incheon, South Korea
- Genres: K-pop, dance, R&B
- Occupation: Singer
- Instrument: Singing
- Years active: 2001–present
- Label: GF Music
- Website: YURIMUSIC on X

- Jung Yu-ri
- Hangul: 정유리
- RR: Jeong Yuri
- MR: Chŏng Yuri

Jung Yu-ri (Korean: 정유리; born December 6, 1984), or Yu-ri, is a South Korean singer. She debuted in 2001 with her album Just Like R&B. She released the album Seurureuk (스르륵) on June 6 using the stage name AB (에이비).

== Career ==
=== Debut ===
At the 2000 Cyber Music Festival, she entered a contest as a participant and was noticed for her voice. Immediately compared to Japanese-American singer Hikaru Utada since during the time she performed R&B music and wrote her own songs. She debuted at the age of 18 with her first album Just Like R&B. Despite not getting the expected success, she would collaborate with artists like: MC Sniper, Stony Skunk and Honey Family.

=== 2006–2010: First singles ===
In October 2006, she released her first single titled 1st Single. She went on to find more opportunities again by collaborating with MC Sniper, Rhymer, Main Stream, Namolla Family before releasing her second album The Ring of Diamond in April 2008. This album was different from her first as she sings Pop and Ballad music instead of R&B. In November, she released her commercial single Yepp Song (Music Is My Life) and later releasing her second single Doh Doh. As the Christmas holiday grows closer, she releases her third single From December. She released her fourth single Damn Love (그딴 사랑) on December 10, 2010.

=== 2011: AB debut and controversy ===
She returned using AB (에이비) as the stage name for the Seureureuk (스르륵) album with the song "Slip", however it was banned by Munhwa Broadcasting Corporation (MBC), Korean Broadcasting System (KBS), Seoul Broadcasting System (SBS) after discovering its sexually suggestive content.

== Discography ==
=== Studio albums ===
Album Information	Track Listing
Just like R&B: Release Date: September 11, 2001; Format: CD, Digital Download; Label: J Media	1. Intro (Just Like R&B); 2. More & More (Feat. Bobby Kim); 3. 슬픈 영혼; 4. 다가와 준다면 (Feat. Steady-B); 5. 작지만 커다란 사랑; 6. 기도 (Feat. 3534); 7. Cum on Cum on (Feat. Foxy); 8. 선물; 9. 나만의 시간; 10. Name Of Love (MC haNsAi Remix); 11. 친구; 12. 작지만 커다란 사랑 (Piano Variation)
The Ring of Diamond: Released Date: April 4, 2008; Format: CD, Digital Download; Label: Mnet Media	1. 가슴아 제발; 2. 난 이제 어쩌죠; 3. 천천히 오세요; 4. 행복한 여자; 5. 남자; 6. Gift Of God; 7. 휴대폰 왜 잠궈놔 (Feat. 리치); 8. Sexy Night (Feat. 신교); 9. 내꺼; 10. 젖은 나비; 11. Foxy; 12. 반대말 (with 이지훈); 13. 날아올라; 14. 가슴아 제발 (Instrumental Version)

=== Featured appearances ===
- 2005 - "Mrs." - Baechigi (featured vocalist)
- 2005 - "Jackson 5" - Baechigi (featured vocalist)

=== Single albums ===
Album Information	Track Listing
날아올라: Released Date: October 24, 2006; Format: CD, Digital Download; Label: GF Music	1. 날아올라; 2. 무인도 (Remake); 3. Not A World Apart (WYD Game Music); 4. Not A World Apart (Remix Version)
Doh Doh: Released Date: August 12, 2009; Format: CD, Digital Download; Label: Mnet Media	1. Doh Doh (Vocoder Version); 2. Doh Doh (Original Version)
From December: Released Date: December 9, 2009; Format: CD, Digital Download; Label: GF Music	1. From. December; 2. From. December (Instrumental)
그딴사랑: Released Date: December 10, 2010; Format: CD, Digital Download; Label: GF Music	1. 그딴사랑
스르륵: Released Date: June 6, 2011; Format: CD, Digital Download; Label: GF Music	1. 스르륵 (feat. Jacob Eye); 2. Apple (feat. 마이티 마우스); 3. 스르륵 (Instrumental); 4. Apple (Instrumental)

=== Commercial Singles ===
Album Information	Track Listing
Yepp Song (Music is My Life): Released Date: November 7, 2008; Format: Digital Download; Label: Mnet Media	1. Yepp Song (Music Is My Life)

=== Music video ===
- 스르륵 (Slip) (2010)
