= Glossary of rowing terms =

In competitive rowing, the following specialized terms are important in the corresponding aspects of the sport:

== Boat classes ==
In competitive rowing events, abbreviations are used for different boat classes.

Weight

- L, LWT or Lt: Lightweight rowing
- If not present the crew is open weight

Age

- J: Junior(Under 19 years of age)
- B: Senior B (Under 23 years of age)
- Masters: over 27, includes a letter designation for the average age of the crew:
  - A – 27 years of age and older
  - B – 36 years of age and older
  - C – 43 years of age and older
  - D – 50 years of age and older
  - E – 55 years of age and older
  - F – 60 years of age and older
  - G – 65 years of age and older
  - H – 70 years of age and older
  - I – 75 years of age and older
  - J – 80 years of age and older
- If none of these abbreviations are present the crew is Senior A
- These age categories are effectively common to both FISA (Bye-Law to Rule 27) and USRowing (Rule 4–104) rules. USRowing also designates a AA category for ages 21–26, and defines Masters as over 21 rather than 27.
- There are no age restrictions for coxswains and their age is not factored into the average age of the crew.

Gender

- M: Men's
- W: Women's
- Mixed: Equal numbers of either gender (excluding coxswain)

Crew Size

- 1, 2, 4, 8: The number of rowers in the crew. It is common to use Roman numerals, especially when referring to a VIII.

Discipline

- x: Sculling boat
- If not present then the boat is sweep-oar

Coxswain

- +: Coxed (with coxswain)
- -: Coxless (without coxswain)
- If not present then the boat is coxless, except for an eight.

Examples

- M8+ = Men's eight
- W4- = Women's coxless four (or "straight four")
- LM2- = Lightweight men's coxless pair
- BM1x = Men's single sculls under age 23
- JW4x = Junior women's quad
- Masters WC2x = Masters women's double sculls with average crew age between 43–49
- Mixed Masters 8+ = Eight with 4 women and 4 men as rowers and a coxswain of either gender

== Athletes ==
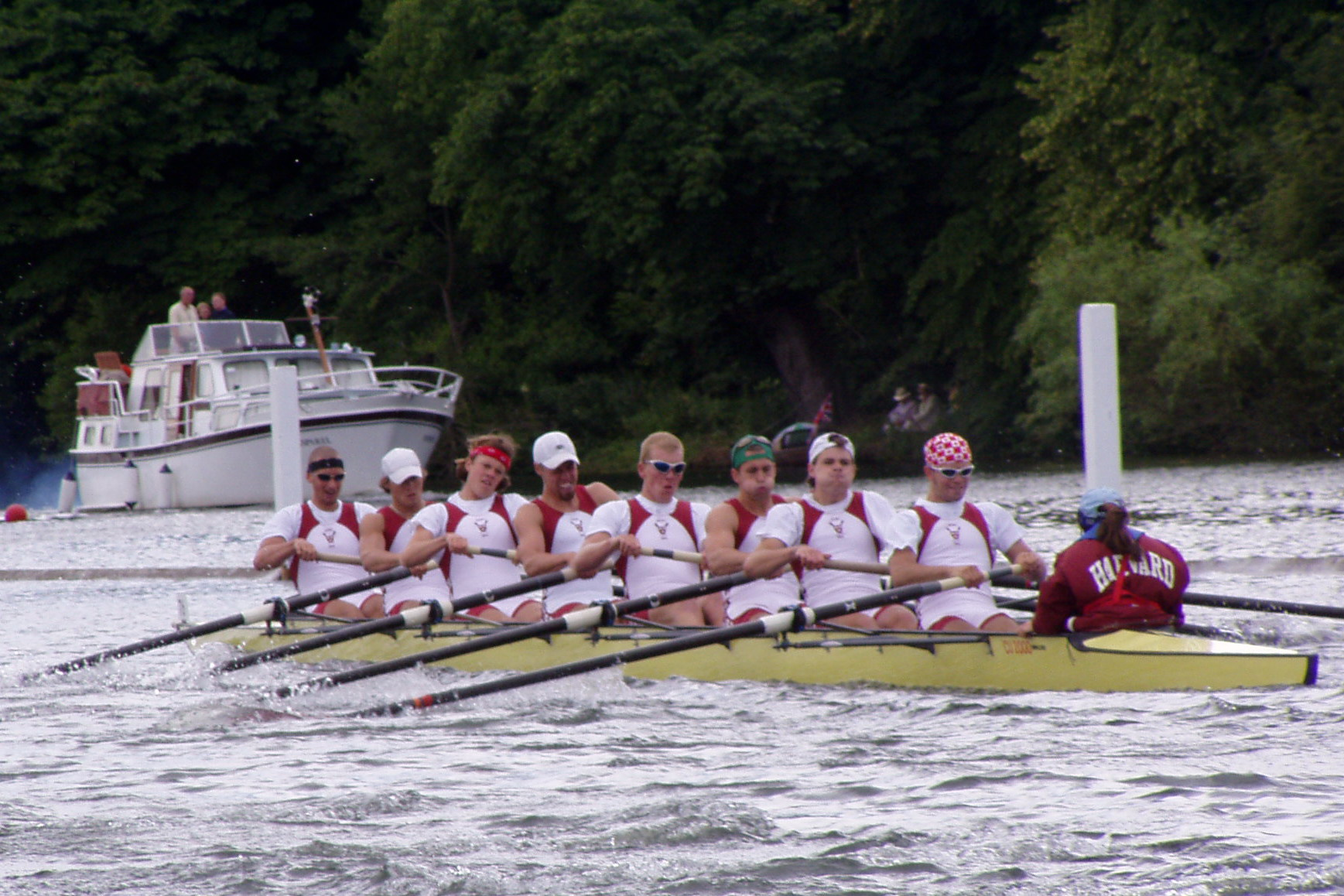
An 8-oared sweep racing shell (8+).

Ambidextrous (UK) and bisweptual (US)
A rower who can row both on port side and starboard side.
Bow (or bow seat)
The rower closest to the front or bow of a multi-person shell. In coxless boats, often the person who keeps an eye on the water behind them to avoid accidents.
Bowside
(UK) Any sweep rower who rows with the oar on the bowside (usually, the right or starboard side) of the boat.
Coxswain or "cox"
The oar-less crew-member, usually included, who is responsible for steering and race strategy. The coxswain either sits in the stern or lies in the bow of the boat, and faces in the direction of travel.
Engine room
The middle rowers in the boat. In an 8-person shell, these are generally the rowers in seats 6, 5, 4 and 3. They are generally the biggest and strongest rowers, who provide most of the power to the boat. Also called Power House.

Hammer
A rower known more for their powerful pulling rather than technical rowing proficiency.
Heavyweight
A rower who weighs more than the limit for lightweight rowing. Often referred to as Open weight.
Lightweight
A rower whose weight allows them to be eligible to compete in lightweight rowing events.
Novices or novicing
Rowers who are rowing for their first year, or (in the UK) a rower who has not won a qualifying regatta.
Port
(US) A sweep rower who rows with the oar on the port or left side of the boat. This means that the oar blade is placed to the rower's right side.

Sculler
A rower who rows with two oars, one in each hand.
Seat number
A rower's position in the boat counting up from the bow. In an eight, the person closest to the bow of the boat is 1 or "bow," the next is 2, followed by 3, 4, 5, 6, 7 and finally 8 or "stroke." In certain countries the seats are numbered the opposite way, from stroke up to bow.
Starboard
(US) A sweep rower who rows with the oar on the starboard or right side of the boat. This means that the oar blade is placed to the rower's left side.
Stroke or stroke seat
The rower closest to the stern of the boat, responsible for the stroke rate and rhythm.
Stroke side
(UK) Any sweep rower who rows with the oar on the stroke side (usually, the left or port side) of the boat.
Sweep
A style of rowing in which each rower uses one oar.
Wash
The wake from a motorized boat, disliked by rowers as the wash affects the boat stability and can cause water to flood over the gunwales.

== Boats ==
Sometimes called "shells" in the US

=== Sweep ===
In a sweep boat, each rower has one oar.

Eight (8+)
A shell with 8 rowers. Along with the single scull, it is traditionally considered to be the blue ribbon event. Always with coxswain because of the size, weight and speed of the boat – bow loader eights exist but are banned from most competitions for safety reasons.
Four (4-) or (4+)
A shell with 4 rowers. Coxless fours (4-) are often referred to as straight fours, and are commonly used by lightweight and elite crews and are raced at the Olympics. In club and school rowing, one more frequently sees a coxed four (4+) which is easier to row, and has a coxswain to steer.
Pair (2-) or (2+)
A shell with 2 rowers. The Coxless pair (2-), often called a straight pair, is a demanding but satisfying boat to master. Coxed pairs (2+) are rarely rowed by most club and school programs. It is no longer an Olympic class event, but it continues to be rowed at the World Rowing Championships.

=== Sculling ===
In a sculling boat, each rower has two oars or 'sculls', one on each side of the boat.

Octuple (8x)
A shell having 8 rowers with two oars each. Generally a training boat, but raced by juniors in the UK.
Quad (4x)
A shell having 4 rowers with two oars each. Can be coxed (4x+) but is usually coxless (4x-).
Triple (3x)
A shell for three scullers with two oars each, usually without a coxswain. These boats are considerably rare.
Double (2x)
A shell for two scullers generally without a coxswain.
Single (1x)
A shell designed for an individual sculler. Very good for skill development, particularly beginners, and a very competitive class at world events, WRC. Extremely rare is the coxed single which is only used as a training boat or for adaptive rowing.

=== Open-water boat ===
A shell with positive flotation, self-bailing capacity, a non-binding stretcher, and no forestay so re-entry is easier. These boats are generally shorter and wider at the waterline than boats designed for flat-water racing.

== Equipment, parts of the boat ==
Rigging is how the boat is outfitted, including all of the apparatuses (oars, outriggers, oarlocks, sliding seats, etcetera) attached to a boat that allow the rower to propel the boat through the water. The term comes from an old Old English wrigan or wrihan, which means "to clothe." It literally means to outfit or clothe a boat. Rigging also refers to the configuration of the boat and settings of the apparatuses. The following terms are often associated with a boat's rigging, along with other often used terms for equipment used in rowing.

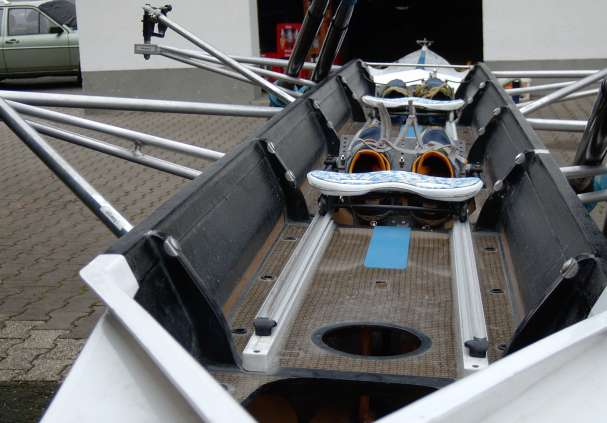
The inside of a double scull. Shows the seat, slides, backstops, footplate, shoes and riggers.

Backstay
A brace which is part of the rigger of sweep rowing boats, which extends toward the bow from the top of the pin.
Backstop
The stop mechanism on the seat slides which prevents the rower's seat from falling off the sliding tracks at the back end (towards the boat's bow) of the slide tracks. Also, in the UK, the sliding seat position closest to the boat's bow. As a command, it instructs the crew to adopt this position. (The US calls this seat position the "back end").
Blade
The spoon or hatchet/cleaver shaped end of the oar. Also used to refer to the entire oar.
Bowloader / bowcox / bow steered
A shell in which the coxswain seat is near the bow of the boat rather than its stern. The seat in a bow loader partially enclosed and is designed so that the coxswain is virtually lying down, in order to reduce wind resistance and distribute the coxswain's weight so as to create a lower center of gravity.
Bow
The front section of a shell; the first section of the shell to cross the finish line.
Bow ball
A soft, colored ball no smaller than 4 cm diameter securely attached to a rowing or sculling boat's bow. Primarily intended for safety (preventing the tip of the bow from hitting other things), but also used in deciding which boat crossed the finish line first in very close races.
Bow number
A card displaying the lane number assigned to the boat for a race.
Bow rigged
(UK) The person stroking the boat has their oar on the bowside (starboard or right) rather than the usual strokeside of the boat.
Bowside
(UK) The [starboard] or right side of a boat. Derives from the tradition of having the bow rower's oar be on the starboard or right side of the boat.

Bucket rigged
a way of rigging a boat so that a pair of rowers both row on the same side of the boat, contrary to rigging on alternate sides. In eights, double and triple buckets are possible (variants also known as German rigged, Italian rigged or tandem-rigged).

Canvas
The deck of the bow and stern of the boat, which were traditionally covered with canvas.
Cleaver blade
Modern oar blades that have a more rectangular hatchet-shape. (also hatchet blade)
Collar / Button
A wide plastic ring placed around the sleeve of an oar. The button stops the oar from slipping through the oarlock.
Cox box
Portable voice amplifier; may also optionally incorporate digital readouts displaying stroke rate, boat speed and times.
Coxmate
A portable amplification device, similar to a coxbox, incorporating a digital readout. Higher-end models may also have a built in radio and speed sensor.
Empacher slot
A UK term for the clip on the top of the bow for holding racing number plates.
Ergometer (also ergo or erg)
An indoor rowing machine.
Foot stretcher
An adjustable footplate, to which a pair of shoes is typically attached, which allows the rower to easily adjust their physical position relative to the slide and the oarlock. The footplate can be moved (or "stretched") either closer to or farther away from the slide frontstops. (also "Footplate", "Footchock", "Footstop", or "Stretcher")

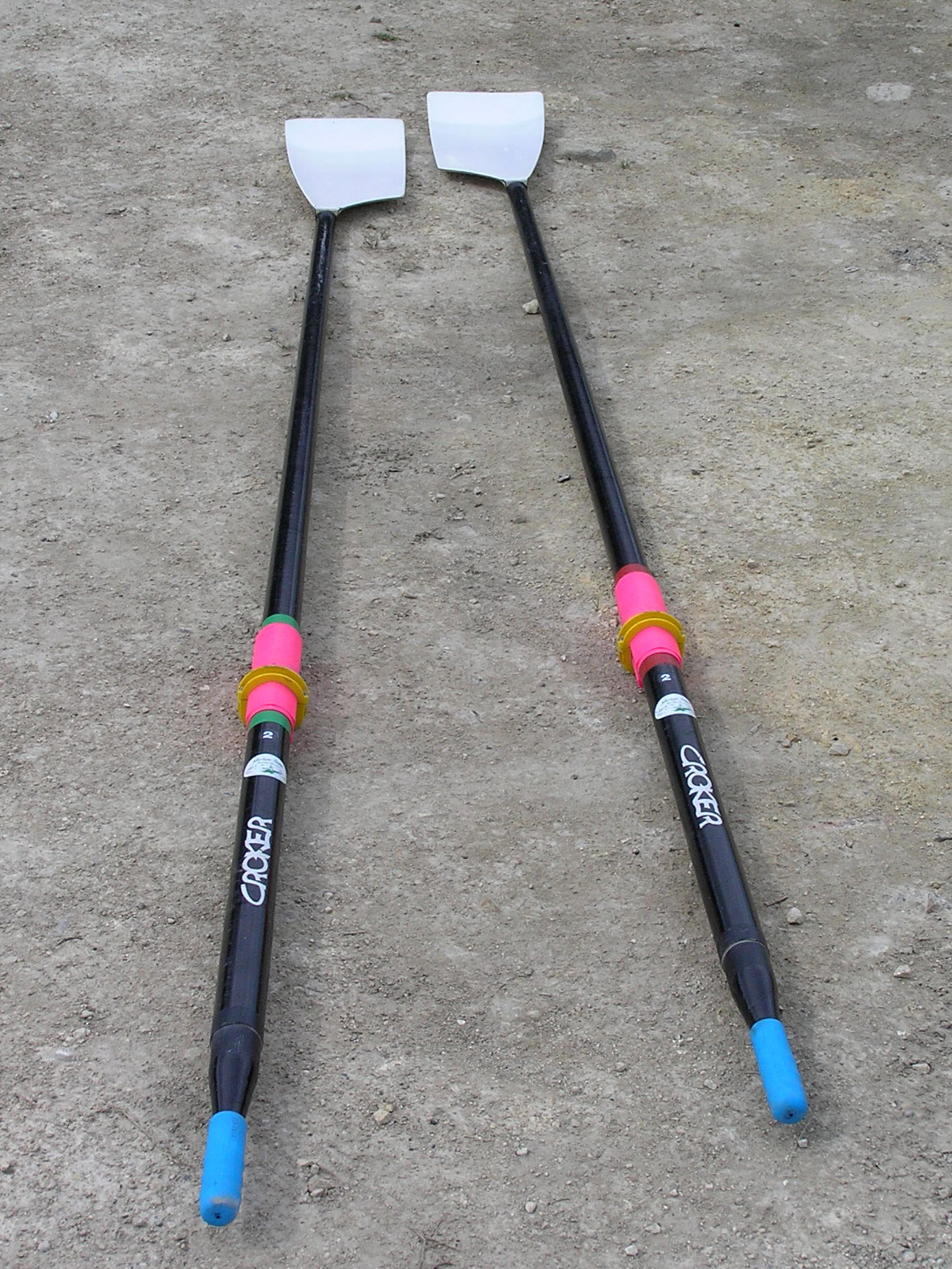
Two sculling oars. The "blades" are at the top of the picture and the handles are at the bottom of the picture. These blades are "hatchet blades."

Frontstop
The stop mechanism on the seat slides which prevents the rower's seat from falling off the sliding tracks at the front end (towards the boat's stern) of the slide tracks. Also, in the UK, the sliding seat position closest to the boat's stern. As a command, it instructs the crew to adopt this position. (The US calls this seat position the "front end")
Gate
(UK) Bar across the top of rowlock, secured with a nut, which prevents the oar from coming out of the rowlock. Also historically used to refer to the oarlock or rowlock. Swivel (US)

Gunwales
(pronounced: gunnels) The top rail of the shell (also called Saxboard)
Handle
The part of the oar that the rowers hold and pull with during the stroke.
Hatchet blade
Modern oar blades that have a more rectangular hatchet-shape and which are not symmetrical. (also cleaver blade)
Hull
The actual body of the shell.
Inboard
The length of the oar shaft measured from the button (or from the pin) to the handle.
Keelson
A structure timber resembling the keel, but on the inside of the shell.
Launch
A motorboat used by rowing instructors, coaches or umpires. Referred to as a "coach boat" in Canada.
Leather/sleeve
A thick piece of leather (plastic on modern oars) around the oar to keep the oar lock from wearing out the shaft of the oar (typically wood or carbon fiber).
Lines
The ropes held by the coxswain to control the rudder.
Loom
The part of the oar between the blade and the handle.
Macon blade
Traditional U-shaped oar blade. (also spoon blade and tulip)
Oar
A slender pole which is attached to a boat at the Oarlock. One end of the pole, called the "handle," is gripped by the rower, the other end has a "blade," which is placed in the water during the propulsive phase of the stroke.
Oarlock
The rectangular lock at the end of the rigger which physically attaches the oar to the boat. The oarlock also allows the rower to rotate the oar blade between the "square" and "feather" positions. Also historically called 'Rowing Gate' by some manufacturers.
Outboard
The length of the oar shaft measured from the button to the tip of the blade.
Outrigger
(See Rigger)
Pin
The vertical metal rod on which the rowlock rotates.
Pogies/poagies
A type of glove covering only the hand leaving the fingers exposed. These allow the rower to grip the oar while also warming the hands, used frequently by rowers in colder climates.
Port or portside
(US) The left side of the boat when facing toward the bow (strokeside in UK).

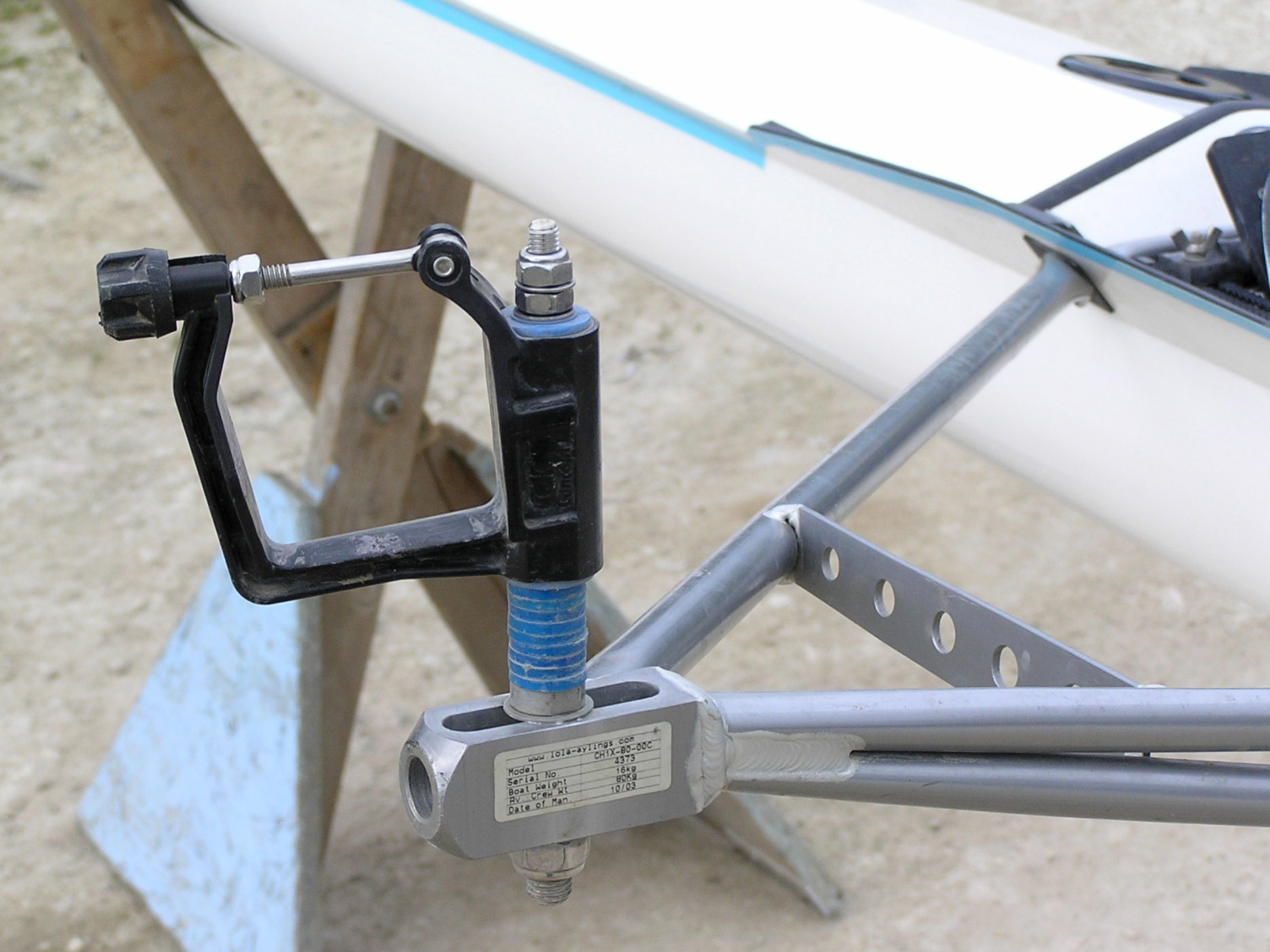
An oarlock attached to a rigger

Ribs
The name given to the curved parts of the boat to which the skin of the hull is attached. They are typically made of wood, aluminum or composite materials and provide structural integrity. (see also shoulder).
Rigger
Rowing slang name for an outrigger. It is a projection from the side (gunwale) of a racing shell.outrigger The oarlock is attached to the far end of the rigger away from the boat. The rigger allows the racing shell to be narrow thereby decreasing drag, while at the same time placing the oarlock at a point that optimizes leverage of the oar. There are several styles of riggers, typically attached either to the side of the hull or to the top of the gunwales. The most common is the triangle frame or Euro rigger (USA), with two points attached to the boat (and almost always with a backstay in addition), and the third point being where the oarlock (gate) is placed. Rigging refers to whether a boat is stroked by a port or starboard (i.e. port-rigged, starboard-rigged). With sweep rowing, riggers typically alternate sides, though it is not uncommon to see two adjacent seats rigged on the same side of the boat. (see bucket rigged)
Rollers
The wheels upon which the seat travels along its track.
Rowlock
Often used in the UK to for an Oarlock (see above). Also historically called 'Rowing Gate' by some manufacturers.
Rudder
Adjacent to the skeg and used by the coxswain (or in some coxless boats, by a rower using a "toe" or foot steering mechanism) to steer the boat via attached cables. Extra-large rudders are used on narrower and/or bendier rivers.
Saxboard
The sides and top edge of a boat, to which the riggers attach – see also Gunwales
Scull
(a) An oar made to be used in a sculling boat where each rower has two oars, one per hand (b) A boat (shell) that is propelled using sculling oars, e.g., a "single scull," is a one-person boat where the rower has two oars.
Seat
Molded seat mounted on wheels, single action or double action. Single action is fixed bearing wheel, double action is wheel on axle that rolls on track and rolls on horns of seat. A secondary meaning of location in the shell, the bow seat is one, and is numbered upward to the stroke seat (8, in an 8-man shell). Thirdly can mean a competitive advantage in a race, to lead a competitor by a seat is to be in front of them by the length of a single rower's section of a shell.
Seating
Seating positions in a racing shell are generally numbered from the bow to the stern in English-speaking countries, unlike many non-English-speaking countries which count from the Stroke forward. Generally the forwardmost rower is called the "Bow" and the aftmost rower the "Stroke", regardless of the number of rowers in the boat, with all other seats simply being numbered. So for instance the crew of an eight (with coxswain) would number off from the bow: "Bow", "Two", "Three", "Four", "Five", "Six", "Seven", "Stroke", whereas a four (with or without coxswain) or a quad would number off: "Bow", "Two", "Three", "Stroke".
Shell
The boat used for rowing.
Shoulder
Load bearing supports that mount rigger and attach to keel of boat. (also knee)
Skeg (or fin)
Thin piece of flat metal or plastic that helps stabilize the shell in the water, and is often positioned so that it protects the rudder. Some crews use wooden breakaway skegs to protect the hull in case of impact with debris.
Slides (or tracks)
Hollow rails upon which a rower or sculler's sliding seat will roll. Older shells had double wheels rolling on convex rails.
Slings
Folding, portable temporary boat holders. Two are required to hold a boat.
Smoothie
A blade design developed by Concept2 in which the face of the oar blade is smooth, without the traditional central spine. Later designs called Smoothie Vortex, Fat Smoothie.
Speed coach
A device mounted on the keel that determines the boat's speed based on the speed of a small propeller and transmits this information to the coxbox.
Spoon blade
Traditional U-shaped oar blade, which is symmetrical down the center of the shaft. (also Macon blade or "Tulip")
Starboard (or starboard side)
(US) The right side of the boat when facing forward. (Bowside in UK)
Starboard rigged
(US) A boat where the stroke rower is a starboard rower. (Bow rigged in UK)
Starting gate
A structure at the starting line of the race. The shell is "backed" into the starting gate. Once in the gates a mechanism, or a person lying on the starting gate, holds the stern of the shell.
State room
The space between the gunwales (UK).
Stern
The rear section of a shell.
Stretcher
A slang abbreviation for foot stretchers.
Strokeside
(UK) The port or left side of the boat (even if the boat is bow rigged). Derives from the tradition of having the stroke rower's oar on the port or left side of the boat.
Toe
In some boats without a coxswain, a rower may be able to control the rudder and steer the boat by changing the direction their foot points. This is called "toeing a boat." And the mechanism is called a "toe." (also: "foot steering")
Top-Nut
The nut which screws onto the top of the pin holding the Rowlock in place.
Tracks
(see Slides)
Tulip
(see Spoon blade)
Wheel
(see Roller)
Wing rigger
More modern version of an outrigger in the shape of a wing. It has a stiffer workthru which makes the boat more responsive to the power of the stroke. This can also have the extra support of a backstay.
Zephyr
Lightweight shirt worn by rowers.

== Commands ==
"Let it/her fly" or "Let it run"
Command when everyone in the shell lifts their oar out of the water and balance the shell to make the shell glide on the water.
"(#) At the catch"
Command to tell the rowers to put their oars in water in preparation to start rowing.
"(#) Fall in/out"
These commands tell the rower(s) either to stop rowing or to start rowing with everyone else. (#) indicates the number of rower(s) who should start or stop – e.g. “Bow pair fall-out, stern pair fall-in in two..”
"Ahead" or "Look Ahead"
Command shouted by a crew about to be overtaken by another crew, telling the overtaking crew of their presence.
"(#) hit it" or "(#) row on"
Tells the rowers to row until told to stop –e.g. “Two, hit it...”
"Back it down"
To have the rowers place their blades at the release position, squared, and push the oar handle towards the stern of the boat. This motion causes the shell to move backwards.
"Blades Down" or "Drop"
Used to tell the rowers to place their blades back on the water after performing an easy-all.
"Blades in (side)"
Tell the rowers on one side to pull their blades in, in order to prevent hitting an object or another boat in the water, or to let another crew pass on a narrow river.: "Blades Down" or "Drop": Used to tell the rowers to place their blades back on the water after performing an easy-all.
"Bow ball!"
A coxswain may yell this during a race to signal to the rowers that they have passed through a competing crew's boat and their stern deck is in line with or past the other crew's bow ball.
"Cant it upriver/downriver"
While carrying the shell, the athletes are commanded to hold the shell in a diagonal position, the high side as stated.
"Check it/her down"
Square the oars in the water to stop the boat.
"Count Down" (or "number off")
Tells the crew to call out their seat number, starting at the bow, when ready to row.
"Down on port/starboard"
Means that the boat is leaning to one side or the other. Rowers on the side that is down must raise their hands, and the other side must lower their hands.
"Easy" (or "ease up")
(USA) To stop rowing hard.
"Easy oars" (or "Easy There") (or "Easy-all")
(UK) To stop rowing or paddling.
"Even it out" (or "even pressure")
This command tells the rowers to pull with even pressure on both sides. This is the complement to ease-up.
"Firm up"
Tells the rowers to apply more pressure as needed.
"push for 10" (or "power ten")
Commands the crew to row 10 strokes of special effort. It is frequently given when a crew is attempting to pass another boat.
"Gunnel!"
A command by the coxswain, where the rowers all hit the gunwales (sides) of the boat with their oar handles. Used in set exercises occasionally.
"Hands in"
Tells the rowers to grab the ribs on the inside of the boat so that the boat can be rolled from heads. The coach or cox uses this command when the crew is putting the shell in the water.
"Hands on"
Tells the rowers to grab the boat next to (or opposite) their seats, so that the boat can be carried or moved.
"Hands out" (or "sit ready to shove")
Tells the rowers to grab the dock in preparation for shoving off.
"Hard on port/starboard" (or "port/starboard pressure")
The rowers on that side of the boat must row harder (and the opposite side must row slightly easier) in order to facilitate a sharper turn.
"Heads" or "Heads Up"
Off the water, a shout to alert others to watch out for a boat being carried.
"to Heads, ready, up"
Tells the rowers to press the boat above their heads.
"Hold it/her up"
(UK) Stop the boat.
"Hold it/her hard"
(UK) Emergency stop.
"Hold Water"
(USA) Emergency stop, also used after the command way enough. It instructs the rowers to square their blades in the water to stop the boat.
"Icepicks..."
A way coxswains may describe making a catch. It is an analogy to how ice climbers hook their icepicks into the ice and pull themselves up or forward; rowers are meant to hook their blades into the water and send the boat forward.
"In 2..."
Most water commands are appended prior to the command to take place after two strokes. For example, "In 2, Power 10" or "In 2, Way-enough."
“Inside Grip”
A command used when lifting the boat. Grab the boat so that you can lift it over your head. Grab only the gunwale or hull structure – do not lift by the footstop assembly.
"Lay Hold" (or "hands on")
Command given telling the athletes to go to their stations and grab a hold of the boat.
"Let it/her run"
To stop rowing after a given piece of on the water rowing length, but to put the handles of the oars either to the gunwales or out in front of the rower, in such a manner that the oar paddles are parallel to the water yet not touching it. This allows the boat to glide for a distance leaving no paddle wake in the water. Similar, but not exactly the same is the command "Gunnel", where rowers push the oars until the handle touches the boat's gunwale.
"One foot up & out"
The command for exiting a team boat.
"On the square / Square blades rowing"
To row without feathering the blades on the recovery.
"Open water"
A coxswain may mention this during a race to signal to the rowers that their boat has pulled out in front of a competitor so much so that there the boats are no longer side-by-side at all, and instead there is a length of water between the two crews.
"Paddle"
Tells a crew to row with just enough pressure to move the boat. The paddle command is also used to bring a crew down from full pressure at the end of a workout piece or race. Also, "paddle firm", "paddle light".
“Pick it / Picking”
A rapid stroke where rowers use only their arms and use minimal pressure. An effective and impressive way to turn a boat when done right.
"Power 10" (or "10 firm" )
The command to take 10 strokes at the maximum amount of pressure possible. Used for passing and gaining speed in a race. (sometimes "Power 5", "Power 20", or "Power 30")
"Ready all, Row" (or "Ready all, Paddle")
Begin rowing or paddling.
"Roll it"
Tells the crew to flip the boat over, in unison, from above their heads.
"Set it up"
Reminds the rowers to keep the boat on keel.
"Settle"
A command and a part of the race. This tells the rowers that the crew is going to bring the stroke rate down for the body of the race, but still maintain the pressure. This usually occurs in the middle of the race.
"Ship Oars"
Act of removing the oars from the oar locks and allowing them to float alongside the boat.
"Shoulders, ready, up"
Tells the crew to lift the boat from any position below their shoulders, up to shoulder height. Can be reversed to lower the boat from heads to shoulders, i.e., “Shoulders, ready, down!” This is the best position for carrying a shell.
"Sit in"
Tells the crew to get into the boat.
"Sit ready"
Commands the crew to move to the catch blades buried, and be ready to start the race.
"Scull"
A command used if the stern is held by a stake boat. "Port scull" usually means Two seat takes Bow's oar in front of them and rows lightly with it. Likewise, "Starboard scull" means Three seat takes Two seat's oar and does the same. This is easier than having one seat take a stroke since it can move the boat in a more parallel direction.
"Swing it"
A command used when carrying a boat to start turning either bow or stern.
"Take the run off"
To stop rowing and hold the blades at a 45 degree angle in the water to slow the boat down.
"Throw the boat, ready, up - and down"
lift the boat above heads, and bring it down with the rowers all on one side to place it in the water; or the inverse operation.
“Touch it / Tap it”
A stroke where rowers use only their arms and back. Used mostly for warm-up or to turn a boat.
"Waist, ready, up"
Tells the crew to lift the shell to their waist.
"Watch your blades (side)"
Tells one side to look out at their blades, and take action to prevent them possibly hitting something.
"Run your blades"
(USA) Tells rowers to fully extend their blades away from the boat or pull their oars towards the boat, depending on context. Typically used on docks.
"Way enough"
The command to stop rowing or, in some cases, whatever the rower is doing, whether it be walking with the boat overhead or rowing. ("Way" is a nautical term for the movement of a boat through water (as in headway and right-of-way). So the command "way enough", literally means enough moving the boat). Often pronounced way-nuf, wane-up or wane-off in the United States.

== Stroke ==
Air/Ghost stroke
To take a stroke without the blade having been placed in the water, resulting in a complete lack of power.
Backsplash
Water thrown back toward the bow direction by the blade as it enters the water. Less is best. This indicates that the blade has been properly planted before the rower initiates the drive.
Backwater
To propel the shell backwards.
Body angle
Amount of forward lean of rower's body from hips at the catch.
Bury the blade
Submerge the blade totally in the water.
Catch
The part of the stroke at which the oar blade enters the water and the drive begins. Rowers conceptualize the oar blade as 'catching' or grabbing hold of the water.
Catch point
Where the blade enters the water.
Check
The amount of interruption of the forward movement—usually occurs at the catch and sometimes at the release.
Cover
The distance between one set of puddles and the next set of puddles.
Crab, or catch a crab
A rowing error where the rower is unable to timely remove or release the oar blade from the water and the oar blade acts as a brake on the boat until it is removed from the water. This results in slowing the boat down. A severe crab can even eject a rower (colloquially an "ejector crab") from the shell or capsize the boat (unlikely except in small boats). Occasionally, in a severe crab, the oar handle will knock the rower flat and end up behind the rower, in which case it is referred to as an "over-the-head crab".
Drive
The propulsive portion of the stroke from the time the oar blade enters the water ('catch') until it is removed from the water ('release').
Drunken octopus / drunken spider
The poor technique evident when an Eight (8+) is rowed with no two oars moving in the same time or position in the stroke.
Feather
To turn the oar so that its blade is parallel with the water (opposite of square).
Finish
The portion of the pull-through just as the oar is taken from the water.
Hands away
At the close of the drive phase, the hands move away from the body.
Hanging at the catch
The blade is hesitating at the catch point, before entering the water.
Hot seating
When two crews share the same shell, during a regatta, sometimes it is necessary for the crews to switch at the finish line without taking the boat from the water.
Inside hand
The oarsmen's hand nearest the oar lock. This is the feathering hand.
Jumping the slide
A problem where the seat becomes derailed from the track while rowing.
Keel
The balance of the boat. Good keel means that the stability of the boat is good. "keep keel" is a command often heard from the coxswain when the boat starts to sway. (US)
Lay-back
What the rowers have when they sit with their legs flat and lean towards the bow of the boat with their body.
Leg drive
Power applied to the stroke, at the catch, by the force of driving the legs down. Often heard being yelled from the coach boat.
Missing water
A technical fault where the rower begins the drive before the catch is complete.
Outside hand
The hand of a rower that is placed on the end of the oar handle.
Over reach
Fault done by an oarsman when they comes to their full reach forward and then attempt to obtain even greater length by releasing their grasp on the handle with their outside hand or by bringing their outside shoulder further forward.
Pause paddling
Rowing with a pause between each stroke. The coxswain or rower giving commands will indicate where in the stroke this pause should be taken.
Pitch
The angle between a "squared" blade and a line perpendicular to the water's surface.
Puddles
Disturbances made by an oar blade pulled through the water. The farther the puddles are pushed past the stern of the boat before each catch, the more “run” the boat is getting.
Pull through
The portion of the stroke from the catch to the finish (when the oar is in the water). This is the propulsive part of the stroke.
Rating
The number of strokes executed per minute by a crew. (also Stroke rate)
Ratio
The relationship between the time taken during the propulsive and recovery phases of a rowing or sculling action.
Recovery
The non-work phase of the stroke where the rower returns the oar from the release to the catch.
Release
At the end of the drive portion of the stroke. It is when the oar blade(s) is removed (or released) from the water.
Run
Distance a shell travels during each stroke.
Rushing
When rowers move too quickly along their tracks into the catch. The boat will lose the feeling that it is gliding or "running out."
Set
The balance of the boat. Affected by handle heights, rowers leaning, and timing, all of which affect the boat's balance, after which the coxswain tells rowers to "set the boat". (see keel).
Shooting your slide
When an oarsman's seat moves toward the bow faster than their shoulders.
Skying
A blade that is too high off the surface of the water during the recovery. The rower's hands are too low causing an upset to the balance of the boat (the "set").
Spacing / Run
Distance between bowman's puddle on one stroke and the point at which the No. 7 rower catches water on the next stroke.
Split time (split)
Amount of time it takes to row 500 meters. Displayed on all ergs and on coxboxes installed on boats with speed coaches (see above).
Square
To turn the oar so that its blade is perpendicular to the water (opposite of feather).
Stern check
The feeling of the boat stopping or moving backward in the water at the start of the drive. It can be caused by many factors, including rushing the slide (see "rushing") and/or missing the catch (see "catch").
Stroke
1. One complete cycle through the process above.
2. The rower in the stern of a multi-person shell, whose timing is followed by the other rowers.
Stroke rate
The number of strokes executed per minute by a crew. (also rating)
Swing
A feeling in the boat when the rowers are driving and finishing their strokes strongly and getting good layback.
Three-quarter/Half/Quarter slide
Shortened strokes, often used during the start of a race or in a warm-up.
Walking
When passing a boat, the coxswain announces each seat as it is passed.
Washing out
When an oar blade comes out of the water during drive and creates surface wash that causes the shell to lose power and become unsteady.

== Race ==
Start
In head-to-head races, the start is one of the most important parts of the race. In head races, where boats do not race next to each other, there is a running start, where rowing begins before the starting line and rowers are already at full speed when they cross the start. In sprints (head-to-head), the start consists of the following sections:
1. Actual start: This is generally five or six partial strokes done at a high rate and in a certain pattern, i.e. some three-quarter length strokes (sometimes called three-quarters slide, or "draws"), followed by half strokes ("winds"), which are then lengthened into full length strokes. The goal is to get the rowers off to a cohesive start and quickly build momentum, with the rate of the draws being held by the subsequent lengthens. In the draws, it is important to grip the water gently at first and not to "rip", causing turbulence and not transmitting energy effectively. An example start, called by the coxwain, would go as such: "Draw....there! Draw....there! Wind one! Wind two! Wind three! Lengthen it out....Lengthen....Lengthen". The tone, pitch and rhythm of the cox's voice helps to guide the crew as to what is required.
2. High Ten: A set of strokes done at a high cadence immediately after the start. Not to be confused with "Power Ten," the high ten is ten strokes at a high rating to finish building speed. Some crews may pull fifteen or twenty high strokes to build even more speed.
3. Settle: Immediately after the rowers complete their high cadence strokes, the stroke tempo is lowered and the stroke lengthened to the rating to be used throughout the body of the race. Often accompanied by a Power 10 or 20. Coxswains may call a "Ten to Settle" or "Ten to Glide" to drop the cadence more gradually.
In bumps racing, the start is of greater importance. Since this kind of racing is focussed on catching the boat starting a length and a half ahead (and equally avoiding being caught), more effort is put into the start than with other types of racing, since it is sure that every other boat will do the same. If you are caught off the start, there is no chance to make it good later in the race. The obvious consequence is that if a boat's individual race goes the whole distance, the extra effort early on takes a toll.
Body
The body of the race is carried out at a consistent rating, with power tens called as the coxswain deems necessary.
Piece
A race simulation, whereby the rowers row a typical racing distance as fast as possible, the purpose is to train the rowers for endurance and anaerobic fitness and generally prepare them for the real race. Pieces are usually acknowledged by the coach: "We will do a piece."
Repechage
The “second chance” race given to those crews which fail to qualify for the finals from an opening heat. “Rep” qualifiers move onto semi-finals or finals depending on the number of entries. Used in international racing.
Sprint
The last 500 meters of most races are generally at a much higher rating than the rest of the race, as crews pull to exhaustion.
Flutter/shunt
In head-to-head races, the coxswain may decide to call a flutter, which is essentially the six-stroke start put into the race close to the end. The flutter may push one boat which is trailing another a few seats ahead, but is extremely demanding on a crew. In many cases, it is used as a desperation move when all other options have been exhausted.
Head race
A long race in which rowers race a twisting course of about 3 miles. A race for time. The start is staggered. Usually in the fall months.

== Miscellaneous ==
Betting shirts
In collegiate competition, crews sometimes "bet" their shirts on the race, and the loser must render a racing shirt with their logo on it to the winner. Traditionally, this was done as the boats were pulled together right after the race ended and shirts were exchanged, but it is now usually done off the water. While there has been questions in regards to the legality of this practice after women's collegiate crew joined the NCAA, the tradition of betting shirts is upheld by the NCAA Operating Bylaws, Section 10.3.1.1. The term can refer to either the practice or the shirt itself; some crews have shirts made specifically for betting so as to keep their racing jerseys should they lose a race.

Egg beater
A race where the crews are drawn randomly from a hat, so that boats are made up of members from different teams and often the lineups include coxswains as rowers and vice versa. Also known as scratch race.

Scratch crew
A crew which has not rowed with each other before.

Open water race
Competition on unsheltered water exposed to current, tide, wind and requiring navigation skills as well as strength, endurance, and technique. Generally uses a mass start and includes a mix of human-powered boats. Typical race distances are 6 to 26 miles.

Pot
A tankard awarded as a prize to each member of a winning crew.

Rowing Suit
A sleeveless, short-legged garment (Also known as a "zoot suit", "zootie" [Australia and New Zealand], "all-in-one" or "AIO" [UK], "trou" [US], "unisuit" or "uni") usually made from lycra, commonly worn by rowers to allow a full range of movement and to reduce the risk of loose clothes catching or being caught in moving parts. Often clubs, schools, and teams will have custom rowing suits adorned with a crest or in their team's colours. Rowing suits largely replace two-piece uniforms that consisted of a tight shirt and shorts.

Seat race
A method to compare two rowers in fours or eights. Two boats race against each other once. One rower from each boat switch positions, and the two boats race again. Relative performance in the two races is used to compare the abilities of the two rowers.

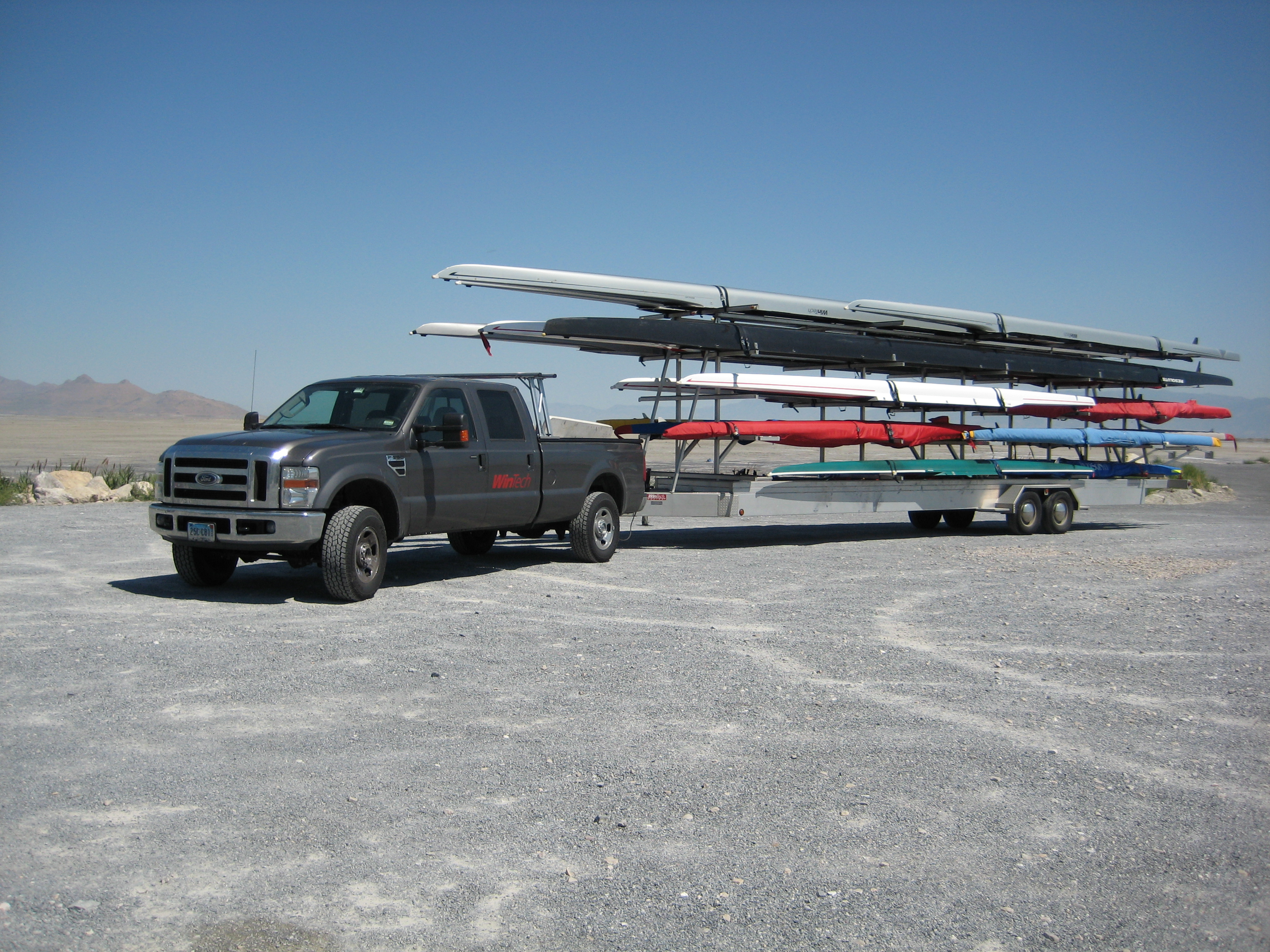
41 foot aluminium trailer with various types of rowing boats

Trailer
A specially made trailer designed to transport boats for the sport of rowing. The trailers are typically made of steel or aluminium and come in a variety of sizes and configurations.
