= Boat positions =

Aspect of rowing

In the sport of rowing, each rower is numbered by boat position in ascending order from the bow to the stern (with the exception of a single scull). The person who is seated on the first seat is always the 'bow', the closest to the stern is commonly referred to as the 'stroke'. There are some exceptions to this: Rowers in continental Europe number from stern up to bow (not in the Netherlands, there numbering is also from bow, no.1, to stern, no. 8 in an 8). Certain crew members have other informal titles and roles. Stroke seat in most cases is responsible for keeping pace for the boat, while the coxswain is responsible for the steering of the boat.

== Rowers ==
Examples are given for the largest common boat, the sweep oar eight (which is always coxed), but the same principles apply to smaller boats, sculling boats, and coxless boats.

=== Stern pair ===
The "stroke" is the rower closest to the stern of the boat and usually the most competitive rower in the crew. Everyone else follows the stroke's timing - placing their blades in and out of the water at the same time as stroke. The stroke can communicate with the coxswain (when in a stern coxed boat) to give feedback on how the boat feels. During a race, it is the stroke's responsibility to establish the crew's rate (number of strokes per minute) and rhythm. (In coxed boats, the coxswain will assist the stroke in establishing the rate). Because of the great responsibilities, the rower in the stroke seat will usually be one of the most technically sound members of the boat, capable of setting a good rhythm. The stroke is typically the best rower in the boat.

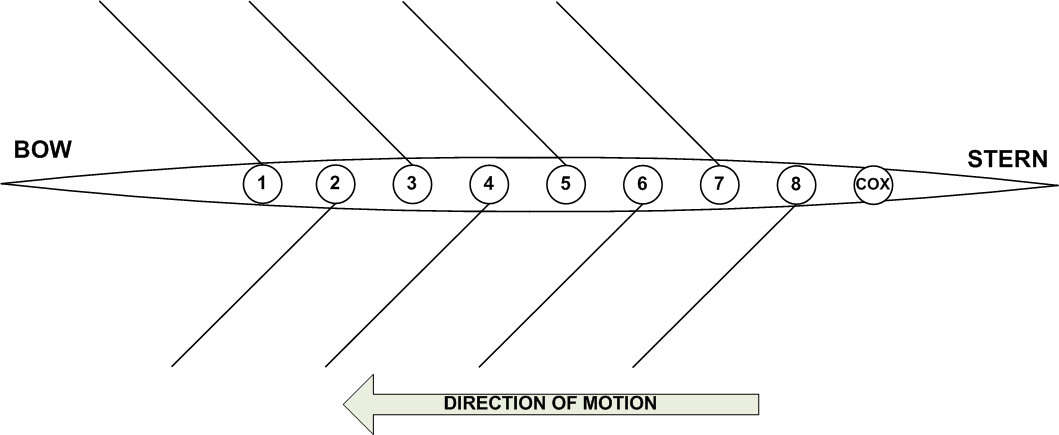
Boat positions within an 8+ shell. (stroke rigged)

The next rower ('seven' in an eight) sits directly behind stroke and is typically both fit and skilled: this rower acts as a buffer between the stroke and the rest of the crew. They closely follow the rhythm set by the stroke and help transmit this rhythm to the rest of the boat, and particularly to the rowers rowing on the same side as seven, since rowers tend to look at the blades on their side of the boat to check their timing. If the stroke increases or decreases the stroke rate it is essential that seven follows this change so that it is translated to the rest of the crew. Number seven usually watches the back of stroke so that they can time when to move up the slide and copy their rhythm. The job of seven is to emulate the rhythm of the stroke.

=== Middle crew ===
The middle rowers of a crew (numbers 2 and 3 in a four/quad, and 3, 4, 5 and 6 in an eight) are normally the most powerful and heaviest rowers, colloquially known as the Fuel Tank, Engine Room, Power House, Big Watts or Meat Wagon. The boat pitches and yaws less in the middle, and the rowers there have less effect on these movements, being closer to the centre of mass and centre of buoyancy. Therefore, the rowers in the middle of the boat do not have to be as technically sound or reactive to the movements of the boat, and can focus more on pulling as hard as they can. It is common practice among crews to put the most technically proficient rowers at the bow and stern and the physically strongest and heaviest rowers in the centre.

=== Bow pair ===
The rower who is closest to the bow of the boat, is usually called either "bow" or the "bowman". In coxless boats, the bow is often responsible for giving calls to the crew. The bow pair of bow and "two", who are the two rowers closest to the boat's bow, are more responsible for the stability (called "set") and the direction of the boat than any other pair of rowers, and are often very technical rowers. The bow of a stern-coxed boat is subject to the greatest amount of pitching, requiring the bow pair to be adaptable and quick in their movements.

Boats that are bow coxed rely on communication between the bow and the cox - as the cox cannot see boats coming up from behind. The bow pair tend to be the smallest of the rowers in the boat. In an 8 boat, bow pair, strength wise, is where the weaker rowers seat. Although weaker, they have some of the best technique out of the whole boat.

== Steering ==
In coxless pairs, double sculls, quadruple sculls and coxless fours, one of the rowers will be designated to steer. He or she will control the rudder using lines attached to the toe of one shoe, which pivots around the ball of the foot. The rower who steers is chosen according to experience and the nature of the course on which the boat is rowing: bow has a clear view ahead when looking over one's shoulder, whereas stroke may be able to steer well on a straight course by pointing the stern at a reference point. A rower steering in the middle of a four or quad is not uncommon, since bow and stroke have other duties already.

== Boat rigging ==
Traditionally a boat is organized so that alternate rowers row on port and starboard (or strokeside and bowside), with stroke on port side (having their blade to their own right) (strokeside). This is sometimes reversed, so that stroke is on the other side (having their blade to their own left); such a boat is usually described as 'bow rigged'. This is often on the basis of the abilities of the available personnel, to allow putting an experienced starboard side (bowside) rower in the stroke seat, for example but it is the norm for UK coastal rowers where racing is done clockwise around buoys. The eight in the illustration at the top of this article is rigged strokeside. If the eight were bow rigged, the oar for the stroke (number 8) rower would be on the other side of the boat (bowside or starboard).

There are other options, and in particular in fours the middle pair may row on the same side: this arrangement means that there is less yawing of the boat through the water throughout the course of the stroke, making it more efficient. The two rowers in the middle, rowing in a 'tandem', need to be well matched and synchronised to make this work (i.e. avoid clashing blades), and the bow person, rowing with a significant gap between them and stroke on their side of the boat, also needs to be able to adapt to the larger space in front of them. Recently around half of finalists in World Cup and World Championships regattas have been rigged with a tandem middle pair, though it is less common at lower levels of competition. Occasionally eights are rigged with one or more tandems: several rigs are possible.
