= Cox box =

Device used in competitive rowing

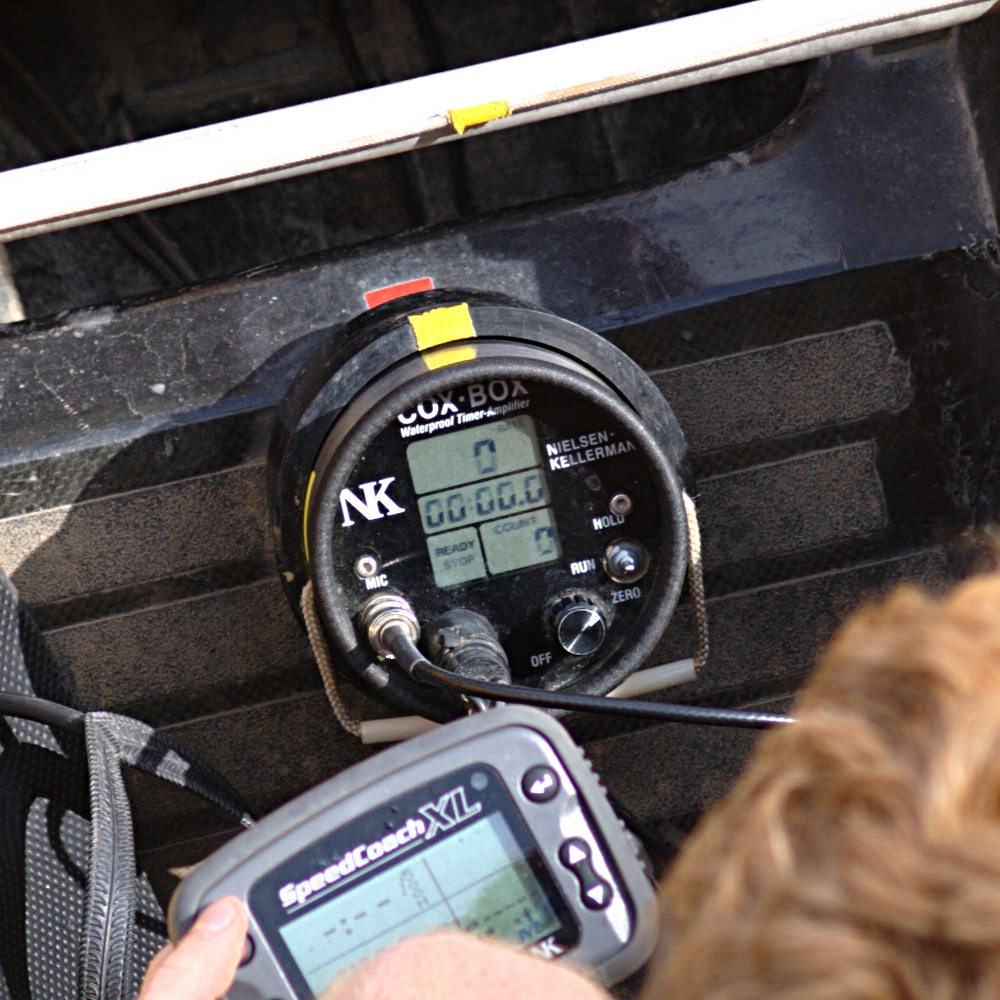
A Nielsen-Kellerman cox box in a rowing shell with a speedcoach

A cox box is an electronic device used in competitive rowing that combines a digital stroke rate monitor, stopwatch, and voice amplifier. It is generally used by a coxswain to monitor the crew's performance, and amplify instructions given by the cox using a microphone and series of wired loudspeakers.

Although the term "cox box" is often used as a generic descriptor of this type of device, multiple companies have registered trademarks of similar terms. For instance, Cox-Box, CoxBox, and Cox Box are all registered trademarks of Nielsen-Kellerman.

== Use ==
Cox boxes are mainly used in eights and fours rowing, where the readouts are used by the coxswain to monitor the performance of the crew and manage the race. This is of particular importance in time trial races where crews race astern (as opposed to side-by-side) and so the performance of other crews cannot be easily gauged. It is also critical to assisting the coxswain in sticking to the race plan, which usually involves strategic changes of stroke rate (the number of strokes executed per minute by a crew.).

The amplifier is linked to one or more loudspeakers inside the boat, making it easier for the crew to hear commands. This is particularly important for rowers towards the opposite end of the boat, or the entire crew in windy conditions. The coxswain typically wears a headband-mounted microphone. Some units have a walkie-talkie connection to the coach, allowing direct communication with the crew.

Rowing shells fitted with speed measuring impellers or GPS can report boat speed to the amplifier display, typically measured in m/s or 500 m predicted split time.

=== Stroke rate ===
Almost all modern coxswain's amplifier systems have a liquid crystal display, showing the stroke rate. On most systems, a magnet is positioned under the stroke rower's seat. In bowloaders, the magnet is placed under the bow rower's seat. As the rower moves up the slide (moving forward to prepare for the next stroke), a measurement is taken and fed to the system. Additionally, the display usually features a timer that can be stopped, cleared, and reset, along with a stroke counter. The display is often equipped with a backlight, useful in poor lighting.

== History ==
Before the development of the cox box, a commonly documented practice was to use a megaphone to improve audibility, strapped to the head of the coxswain. At the same time, the coxswain would use an analog stopwatch and rate watch, which was often cumbersome during races.
