= SpeedCoach =

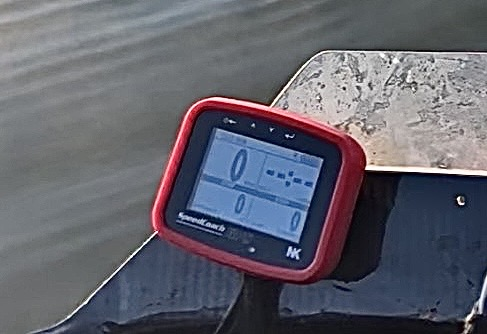
NK SpeedCoach (red) on left side of coxswain seat below splashguard

A SpeedCoach is an electronic device used in rowing which displays stroke rate, split, and time. This information and data is used for effective training sessions and collection of progress overtime. A SpeedCoach is typically used in sculling by one of the rowers, typically the stroke seat, or by a coxswain in addition to, or instead of, a cox box.

== Use ==
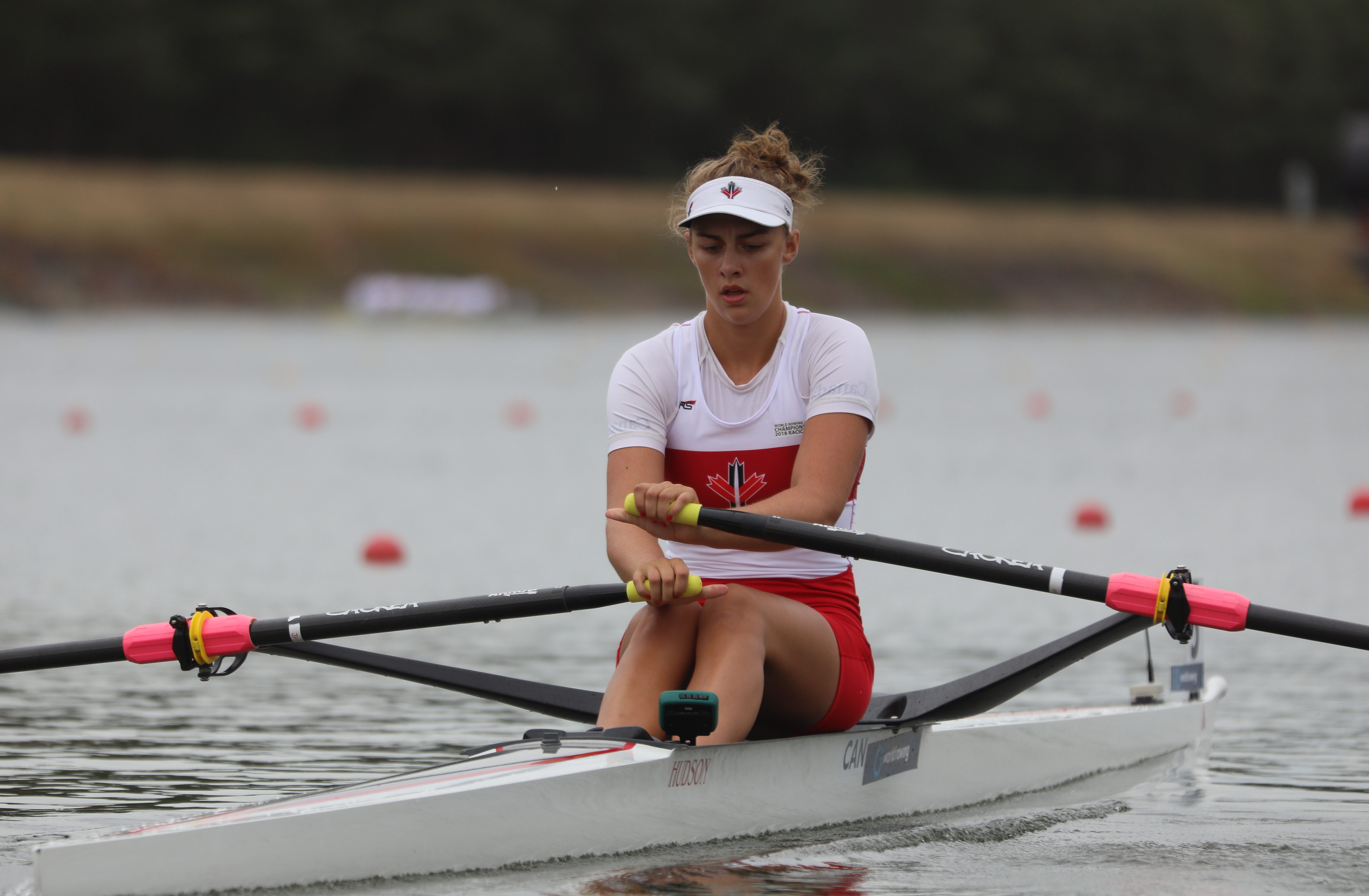
SpeedCoach in dark green near scullers feet.

The term SpeedCoach is trade marked under Nielsen-Kellerman or "NK". The more basic and first version of the SpeedCoach is also trademarked under NK as "'StrokeCoach'", containing the same functions of the SpeedCoach but simplifying features to distance, rate, time and meters, and GPS systems to track. This technology is used by olympic and collegiate rowers and the majority of the rowing community.

StrokeCoaches and SpeedCoaches use a GPS system. This allows for more accurate tracking of path rowed, stroke counts (based on movements of the boat), and accurate meter counts based on the lines recorded.

== Other sports ==
SpeedCoaches are also used in other sports. This includes dragon-boating which uses the StrokeCoach or SpeedCoach, outrigger canoeing which utilizes the SpeedCoach OC2, and paddleboarding which utilizes the SpeedCoach SUP.

== History ==
The StrokeCoach is developed and introduced in 1981 by Nielsen-Kellerman for scullers and straight boats. In the early 2000s new technology developed allowing for the SpeedCoach XL, being the first option to offer wireless live data. Continuous developments have brought the modern SpeedCoach to use, which is wireless and uses a GPS system.
