= Coxed four =

Boat class used in competitive rowing

Coxed four icon

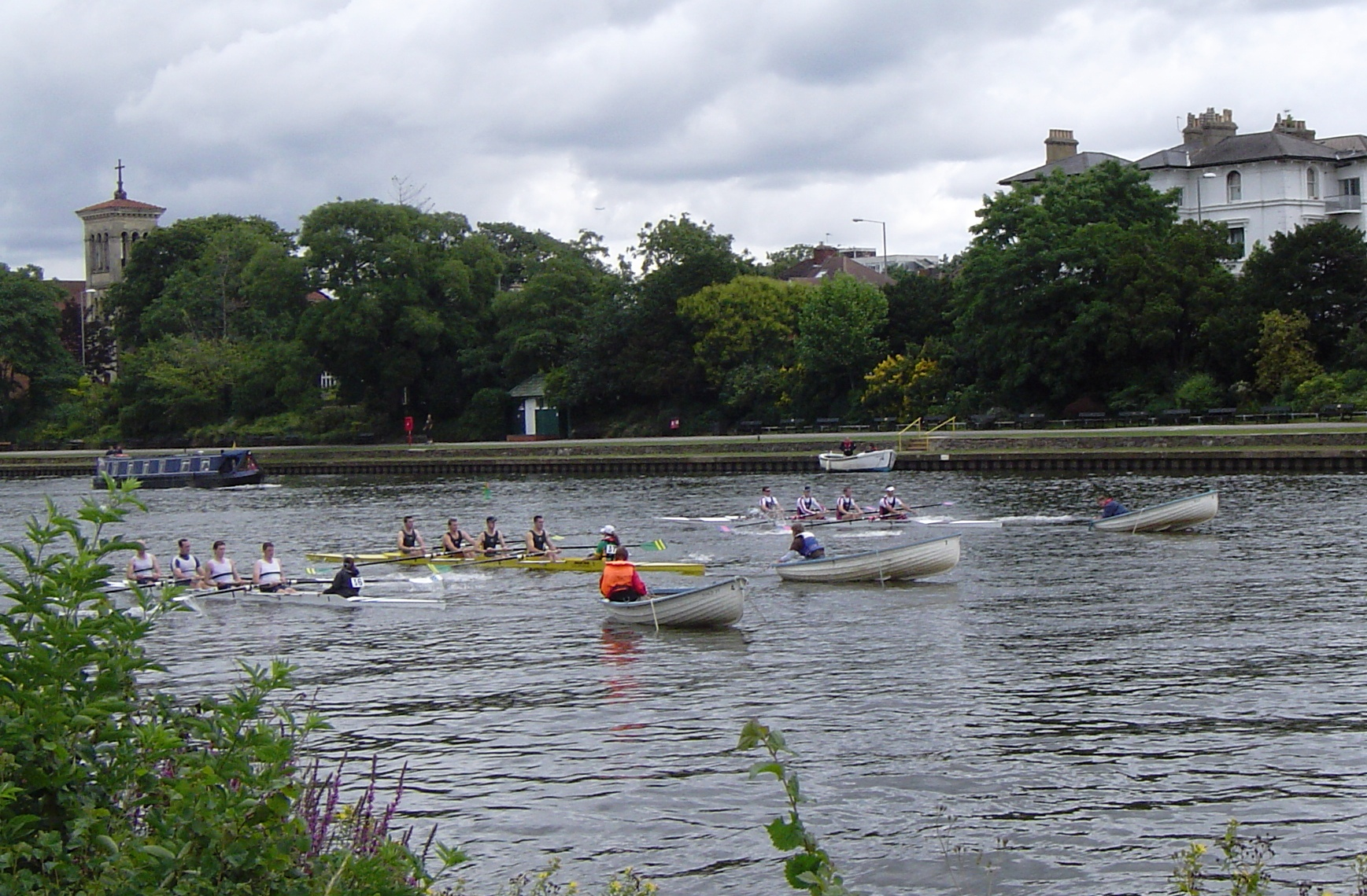
Coxed fours at the start at Kingston Regatta

A coxed four, abbreviated as a 4+, is a racing shell used in the sport of competitive rowing. It is designed for four persons who propel the boat with sweep oars and is steered by a coxswain.

The crew consists of four rowers, each having one oar, and a cox. There are two rowers on the stroke side (rower's right hand side) and two on the bow side (rower's lefthand side). The cox steers the boat using a rudder and may be seated at the stern of the boat where there is a view of the crew or in the bow (known as a bowloader). With a bowloader, amplification is needed to communicate with the crew which is sitting behind, but the cox has a better view of the course and the weight distribution may help the boat go faster. When there is no cox, the boat is referred to as a "coxless four".

Racing boats (often called "shells") are long, narrow, and broadly semi-circular in cross-section in order to reduce drag to a minimum. Originally made from wood, shells are now almost always made from a composite material (usually carbon-fibre reinforced plastic) for strength and weight advantages. Fours have a fin towards the rear, to help prevent roll and yaw and to help the rudder. The riggers are staggered alternately along the boat so that the forces apply asymmetrically to each side of the boat. If the boat is sculled by rowers each with two oars the combination is referred to as a quad scull. In a quad scull the riggers apply forces symmetrically. A sweep oared boat has to be stiffer to handle the unmatched forces, and so requires more bracing, which means it has to be heavier than an equivalent sculling boat. However most rowing clubs cannot afford to have a dedicated large hull with four seats which might be rarely used and instead generally opt for versatility in their fleet by using stronger shells which can be rigged for either as fours or quads.

"Coxed four" is one of the classes recognized by the International Rowing Federation. It was one of the original events in the Olympics but was dropped in 1992. It was also dropped from the World Championships program in 2007.

The world fastest time in the coxed four has been set by the crew from Germany in the final of the World Championships in Vienna, Austria in 1991. The crew of Matthias Ungemach, Armin Weyrauch, Armin Eichholz, Bahne Rabe and coxswain Jörg Dedering finished in a time of 5:58.96 min.

== See also ==
- Rowing at the Summer Olympics
- World Rowing Championships
- Britannia Challenge Cup
- Coxed pair
