= Rowing (sport) =

Sport where individuals or teams row boats by oar

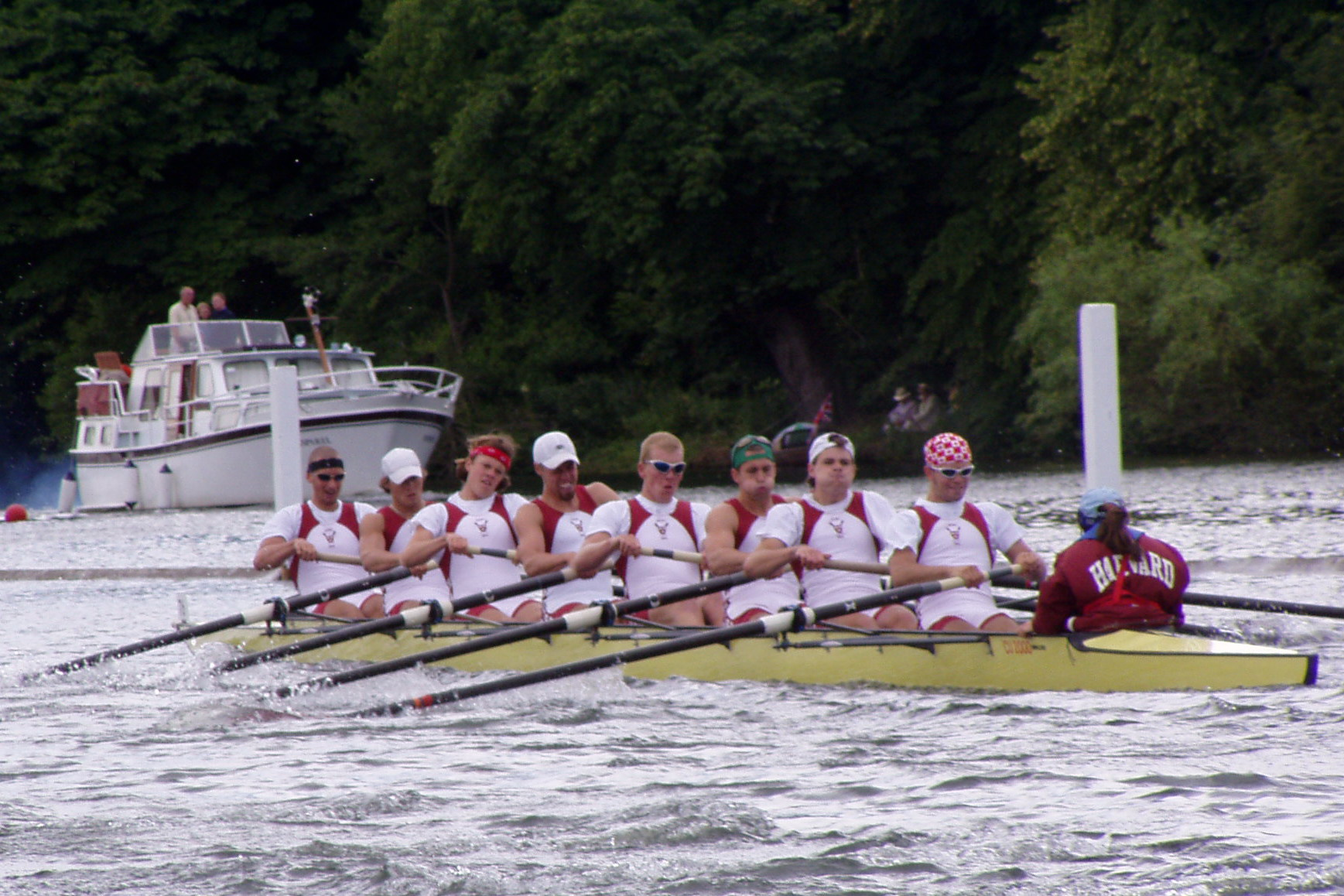
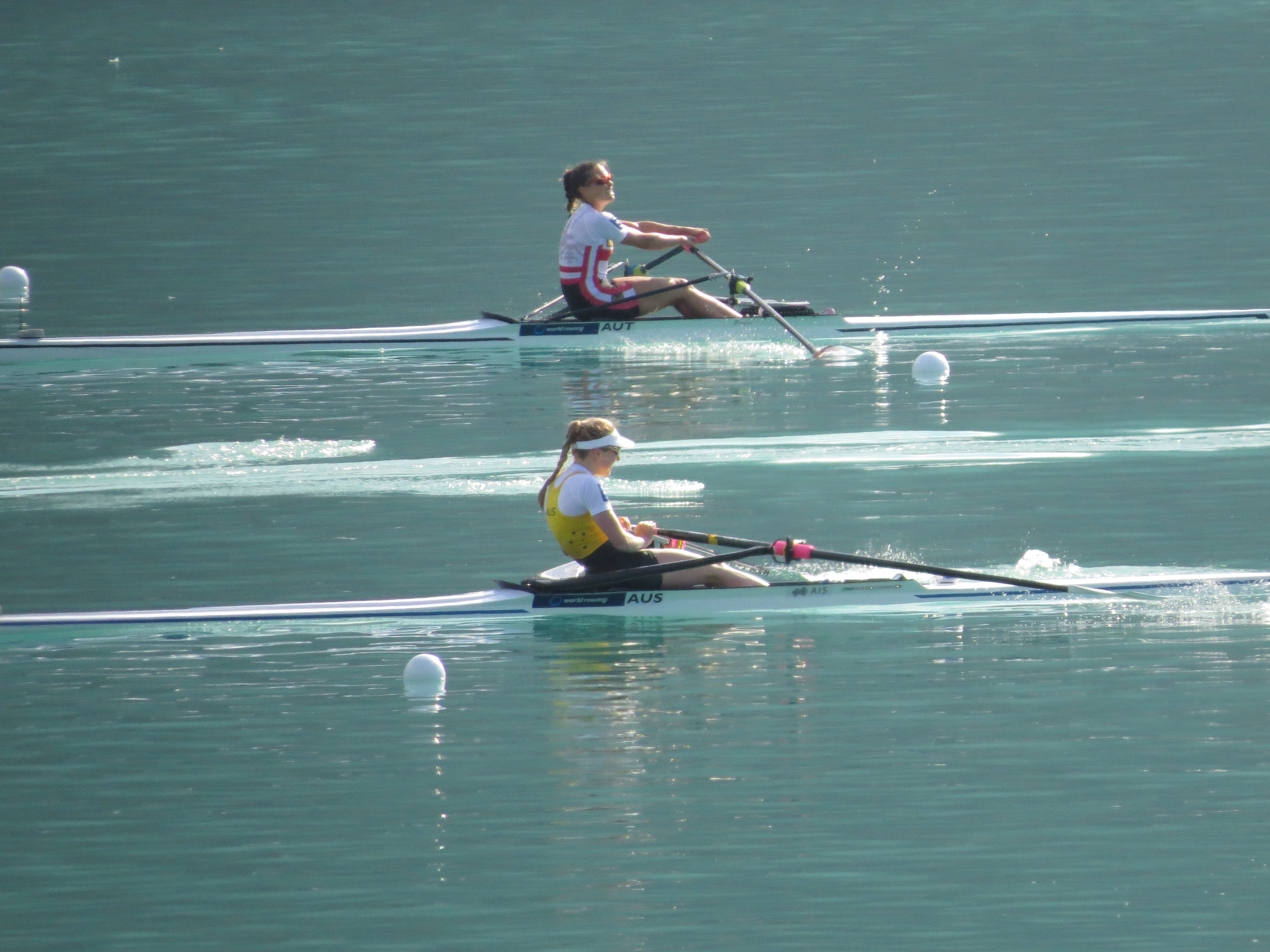
- An eight (top) and single sculls (bottom)
- Highest governing body: World Rowing Federation
- First modern-day competition: 1715 (Note: Doggett's Coat and Badge was first contested in 1715, rowing as a sport has recorded references back to Ancient Egyptian times.)

Characteristics
- Contact: No
- Team members: 1, 2, 3, 4, 5 or 9 (depending on boat class and whether there is a coxswain)
- Mixed-sex: Separate competitions
- Type: Water sport, outdoor
- Equipment: Racing shell, oars
- Venue: River, artificial lake, canal, ocean
- Glossary: Glossary of rowing terms

Presence
- Olympic: since 1900 (men only); since 1976 (both men and women)
- Paralympic: since 2008
- World Games: Indoor: 2017

Pictogram for Rowing at the Summer Olympics

Rowing, often called crew in the United States, is the sport of racing boats using oars. It differs from paddling sports in that rowing oars (called blades in the United Kingdom) are attached to the boat using rowlocks, while paddles are not connected to the boat. Rowing is divided into two disciplines: sculling and sweeping. In sculling, each rower (or oarsman) holds two oars, one in each hand, while in sweeping each rower holds one oar with both hands. There are several boat classes in which athletes may compete, ranging from single sculls, occupied by one person, to shells with eight rowers and a coxswain, called eights. There are a wide variety of course types and formats of racing, but most elite and championship level racing is conducted on calm water courses 2 kilometres (1.2 mi) long with several lanes marked using buoys.

Modern rowing as a competitive sport can be traced to the early 17th century when professional watermen held races (regattas) on the River Thames in London, England. Often prizes were offered by the London Guilds and Livery Companies. Amateur competition began towards the end of the 18th century with the arrival of "boat clubs" at British public schools, the oldest of these being the Westminster School Boat Club, with records dating back to 1813. Similarly, clubs were formed at colleges within Oxford and Cambridge in the early nineteenth century. Public rowing clubs were beginning at the same time in England, Germany, and the United States. The first American college rowing club was formed in 1843 at Yale College.

Rowing is one of the oldest Olympic sports. Though it was on the programme for the 1896 games, racing did not take place due to bad weather. Male rowers have competed since the 1900 Summer Olympics. Women's rowing was added to the Olympic programme in 1976. Today, there are fourteen boat classes which race at the Olympics. In addition, the sport's governing body, the World Rowing Federation, holds the annual World Rowing Championships with twenty-two boat classes.

Across six continents, 150 countries now have rowing federations that participate in the sport. Major domestic competitions take place in dominant rowing nations and include The Boat Race and Henley Royal Regatta in the United Kingdom, the Australian Rowing Championships in Australia, the Harvard–Yale Regatta and Head of the Charles Regatta in the United States, and the Royal Canadian Henley Regatta in Canada. Many other competitions often exist for racing between clubs, schools, and universities in each nation.

== History ==
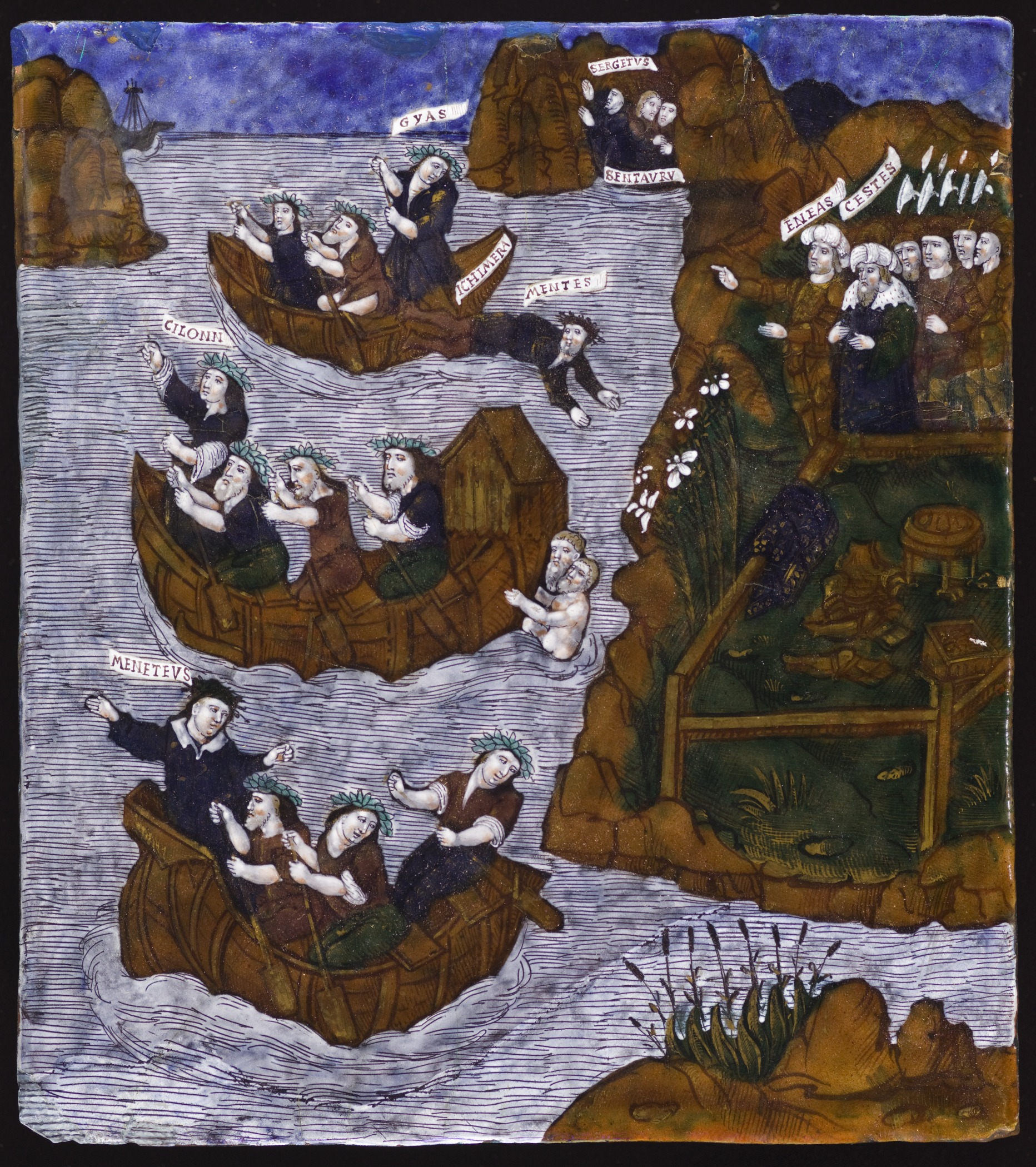
A rowing competition is recounted in the Aeneid, illustrated in this sixteenth-century plaque

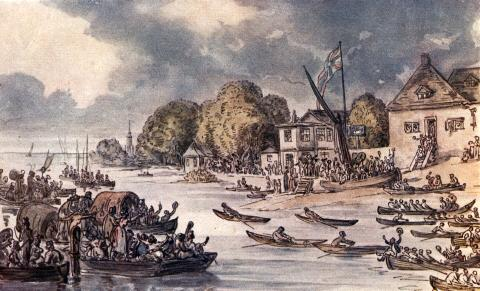
The finish of the Doggett's Coat and Badge. Painting by Thomas Rowlandson.

An Egyptian funerary inscription of 1430 BC records that the warrior Amenhotep (Amenophis) II was also renowned for his feats of oarsmanship, though there is some disagreement among scholars over whether there were rowing contests in ancient Egypt. In the Aeneid, Virgil mentions rowing forming part of the funeral games arranged by Aeneas in honour of his father. In the 13th century, Venetian festivals called regata included boat races among others.

The first known "modern" rowing races began from competition among the professional watermen in the United Kingdom that provided ferry and taxi service on the River Thames in London. Prizes for wager races were often offered by the London Guilds and Livery Companies or wealthy owners of riverside houses. The oldest surviving such race, Doggett's Coat and Badge was first contested in 1715 and is still held annually from London Bridge to Chelsea. During the 19th century these races were to become numerous and popular, attracting large crowds. Prize matches amongst professionals similarly became popular on other rivers throughout Great Britain in the 19th century, notably on the Tyne. In America, the earliest known race dates back to 1756 in New York, when a pettiauger defeated a Cape Cod whaleboat in a race.

Amateur competition in England began towards the end of the 18th century the age before technology. Documentary evidence from this period is sparse, but it is known that the Monarch Boat Club of Eton College and the Isis Club of Westminster School were both in existence in the 1790s. The Star Club and Arrow Club in London for gentlemen amateurs were also in existence before 1800. At the University of Oxford bumping races were first organised in 1815 when Brasenose College and Jesus College boat clubs had the first annual race while at Cambridge the first recorded races were in 1827. Brasenose beat Jesus to win Oxford University's first Head of the River; the two clubs claim to be the oldest established boat clubs in the world. The Boat Race between Oxford University and Cambridge University first took place in 1829, and was the second intercollegiate sporting event (following the first Varsity Cricket Match by 2 years). The interest in the first Boat Race and subsequent matches led the town of Henley-on-Thames to begin hosting an annual regatta in 1839.

Founded in 1818, Leander Club is the world's oldest public rowing club. The second oldest club which still exists is the Der Hamburger und Germania Ruder Club which was founded 1836 and marked the beginning of rowing as an organized sport in Germany. During the 19th century, as in England, wager matches in North America between professionals became very popular attracting vast crowds. Narragansett Boat Club was founded in 1838 exclusively for rowing. During an 1837 parade in Providence, R.I, a group of boatmen were pulling a longboat on wheels, which carried the oldest living survivor of the 1772 Gaspee Raid. They boasted to the crowd that they were the fastest rowing crew on the Bay. A group of Providence locals took issue with this and challenged them to race, which the Providence group summarily won. The six-man core of that group went on in 1838 to found the Narragansett Boat Club. Detroit Boat Club was founded in 1839 and is the second oldest continuously operated rowing club in the U.S. In 1843, the first American college rowing club was formed at Yale University. The Harvard–Yale Regatta is the oldest intercollegiate sporting event in the United States, having been contested every year since 1852 (excepting interruptions for wars and the COVID-19 pandemic).

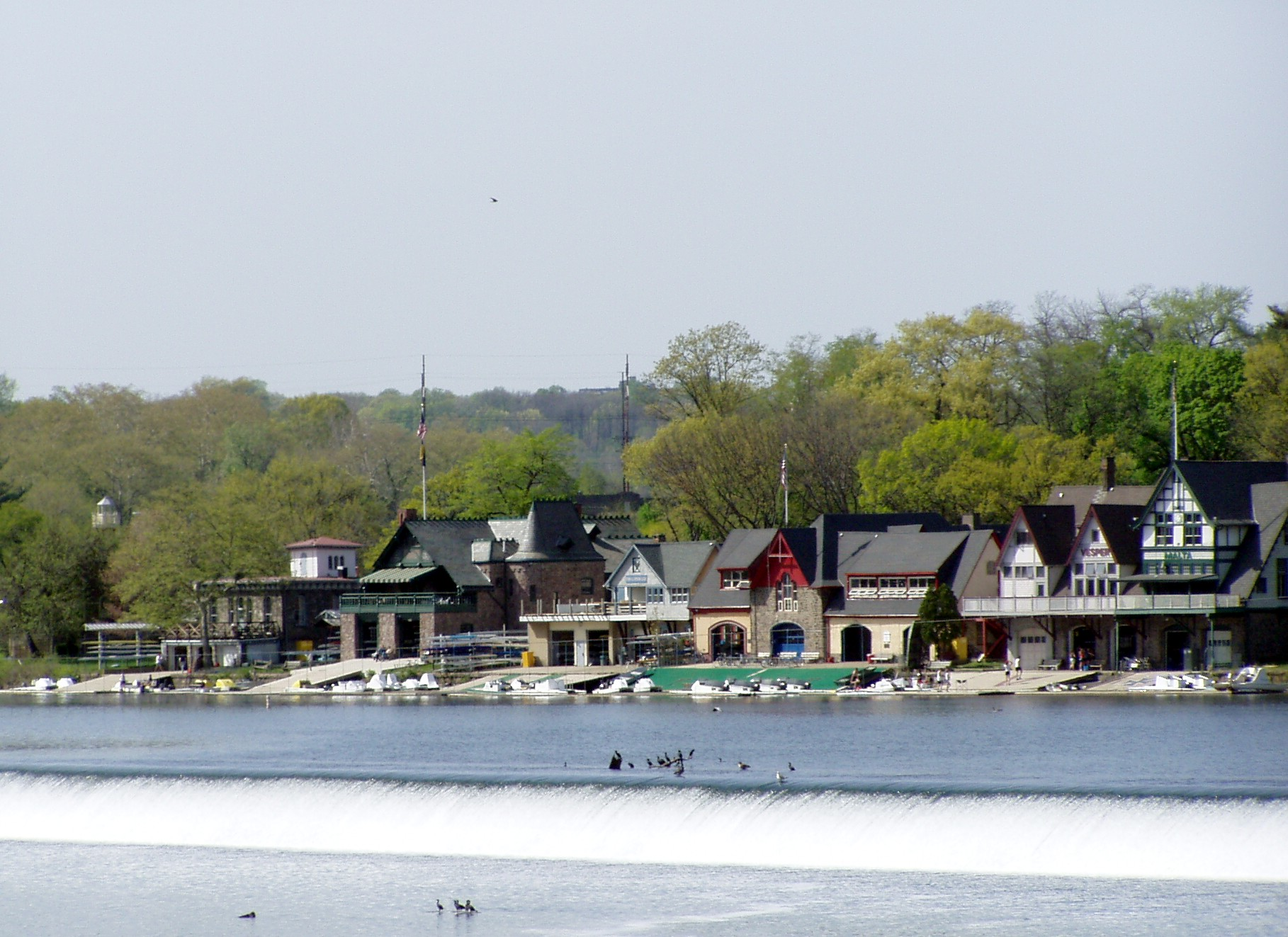
Philadelphia's iconic Boathouse Row, Home of the Schuylkill Navy

The Schuylkill Navy is an association of amateur rowing clubs of Philadelphia. Founded in 1858, it is the oldest amateur athletic governing body in the United States. The member clubs are all on the Schuylkill River where it flows through Fairmount Park in Philadelphia, mostly on the historic Boathouse Row. The success of the Schuylkill Navy and similar organizations contributed heavily to the extinction of professional rowing and the sport's current status as an amateur sport. At its founding, it had nine clubs; today, there are 12. At least 23 other clubs have belonged to the Navy at various times. Many of the clubs have a rich history, and have produced a large number of Olympians and world-class competitors.

The sport's governing body, Fédération Internationale des Sociétés d'Aviron, was founded in 1892, and is the oldest international sports federation in the Olympic movement.

FISA first organized a European Rowing Championships in 1893. An annual World Rowing Championships was introduced in 1962. Rowing has also been conducted at the Olympic Games since 1900 (cancelled at the first modern Games in 1896 due to bad weather).

=== History of women's rowing ===
Women row in all boat classes, from single scull to coxed eights, across the same age ranges and standards as men, from junior amateur through university-level to elite athlete. Typically men and women compete in separate crews although mixed crews and mixed team events also take place. Coaching for women is similar to that for men. The world's first women's rowing team was formed in 1896 at the Furnivall Sculling Club in London. The club, with signature colors a very distinct myrtle and gold, began as a women's club, but eventually allowed the admittance of men in 1901.

The first international women's races were the 1954 European Rowing Championships. The introduction of women's rowing at the 1976 Summer Olympics in Montreal increased the growth of women's rowing because it created the incentive for national rowing federations to support women's events. Rowing at the 2012 Summer Olympics in London included six events for women compared with eight for men. In the US, rowing is an NCAA sport for women but not for men; though it is one of the country's oldest collegiate sports, the difference is in large part due to the requirements of Title IX.

At the international level, women's rowing traditionally has been dominated by Eastern European countries, such as Romania, Russia, and Bulgaria, although other countries such as Germany, Canada, the Netherlands, Great Britain and New Zealand often field competitive teams. The United States also has had very competitive crews, and in recent years these crews have become even more competitive given the surge in women's collegiate rowing. Now there is usually the same number of girls and boys in a group.

== Technique ==
While rowing, the athlete sits in the boat facing toward the stern and uses the oars (also interchangeably referred to as "blades"), which are held in place by oarlocks (also referred to as "gates"), to propel the boat forward (towards the bow). Rowing is distinguished from paddling in that the oar is attached to the boat using an oarlock or a rowing gate, where in paddling there is no oarlock or attachment of the paddle to the boat.

Women's single sculls final at the 28th Summer Universiade 2015

The rowing stroke may be characterized by two fundamental reference points: the catch, which is placement of the oar spoon in the water, and the extraction, also known as the finish or release, when the rower removes the oar spoon from the water.

After the oar is placed in the water at the catch, the rower applies pressure to the oar levering the boat forward which is called the drive phase of the stroke. Once the rower extracts the oar from the water, the recovery phase begins, setting up the rower's body for the next stroke.

At the catch, the rower places the oar in the water and applies pressure to the oar by pushing the seat toward the bow of the boat by extending the legs, thus pushing the boat through the water. The point of placement of the spoon in the water is a relatively fixed point about which the oar serves as a lever to propel the boat. As the rower's legs approach full extension, the rower pivots the torso toward the bow of the boat and then finally pulls the arms towards his or her chest. The hands meet the chest right above the diaphragm.

At the end of the stroke, with the oar spoon still in the water, the hands drop slightly to unload the oar so that spring energy stored in the bend of the oar gets transferred to the boat which eases removing the oar from the water and minimizes energy wasted on lifting water above the surface (splashing).

The recovery phase follows the drive. The recovery starts with the extraction and involves coordinating the body movements with the goal to move the oar back to the catch position. In extraction, the rower pushes down on the oar handle to quickly lift the spoon out of the water and rapidly rotates the oar so that the spoon is parallel to the water. This process is sometimes referred to as feathering the blade. Simultaneously, the rower pushes the oar handle away from the chest. The spoon should emerge from the water perpendicular or square and be feathered immediately once clear of the water. After feathering and extending the arms, the rower pivots the body forward. Once the hands are past the knees, the rower compresses the legs which moves the seat towards the stern of the boat. The leg compression occurs relatively slowly compared to the rest of the stroke, which affords the rower a moment to recover, and allows the boat to glide through the water. The gliding of the boat through the water during recovery is often called run.

A controlled slide is necessary to maintain momentum and achieve optimal boat run. However, various teaching methods disagree about the optimal relation in timing between drive and recovery. Near the end of the recovery, the rower squares the oar spoon into perpendicular orientation with respect to the water and begins another stroke.

=== Technique exercises ===
Rowing technique drills are essential components of a rower's training routine, focusing on specific aspects of the rowing stroke to refine skills and enhance overall performance. These structured exercises, whether performed individually (on the erg), in groups, or whole boat provide a targeted approach to improving coordination, body positioning, and teamwork.

==== Forward pick ====
The forward pick drill, often used as a standard warm-up for rowing crews in groups of 4 or 6, focuses on isolating different components of the recovery and drive sequence. Starting with arms-only strokes and gradually incorporating the back, ½ slide, and full slide, rowers gain a nuanced understanding of the interplay between these elements. The drill aims to enhance body preparation, providing rowers with a tactile sense of how each phase should seamlessly flow into the next.

==== Reverse pick (Korzeniowski drill) ====
The reverse pick drill, executed in groups of 4 or 6, isolates different aspects of the drive sequence. With the boat checked-down (the boat has no speed), rowers initiate the drill with leg-only strokes, gradually adding the back and arms. The emphasis is on maintaining proper body position and sitting tall throughout the exercise. This drill aids in isolating and understanding the distinct elements of the drive sequence and their interconnectedness.

==== Cut-the-cake ====
The cut-the-cake drill typically involves the entire boat. Rowers execute the drill collectively, starting with a normal stroke and transitioning into the subsequent recovery. During this process, the entire crew pivots forward with their bodies, swings back to the finish (without letting the oars drop in the water), then swings forward again to reach the catch position. The swinging motion, referred to as "cutting the cake," involves coordinated movements by all rowers, creating a unified and synchronized exercise aimed at improving boat balance, swing, and recovery timing.

==== Quarter or half slide rowing ====
Designed for the entire crew or smaller groups, this drill involves rowing using only a quarter or half of the slide at a high rating with a full press. It sharpens quick catches and emphasizes coordination during the recovery phase.

==== Square-Wide-6 ====
The Square-Wide-6 drill, conducted in groups of 6 or 4, requires rowers to take a wide grip on the oar handle, emphasizing a specific body position during the recovery. This encourages proper body positioning and enhances body flexibility

==== Feet-out rowing ====
Feet-out rowing, performed either collectively by all rowers or in smaller groups, involves the removal of feet from the shoes and placement of feet on top of the shoes. This drill helps rowers maintain continuous pressure on the footboard, especially during oar release. Despite challenges like early leg finishing or excessive layback, feet-out rowing reinforces improved leg connection and more reasonable layback, translating on-the-water skills to the erg for a more efficient rowing experience.

==== Rowing Blind ====
When in a safe environment, all rowers (coxswain excluded) close their eyes and row together for a set amount of time. The purpose of this exercise is to allow rowers to feel the movement of the boat and find rhythm with their teammates in the shell. This exercise can be performed during the full stroke or as part of a pick drill.

==== Rowing on the Square ====
Rowing on the square involves rowers not feathering their blades when recovering from the finish to the catch. Rowing with squared blades works on the balance of the shell.

== Boat classes ==
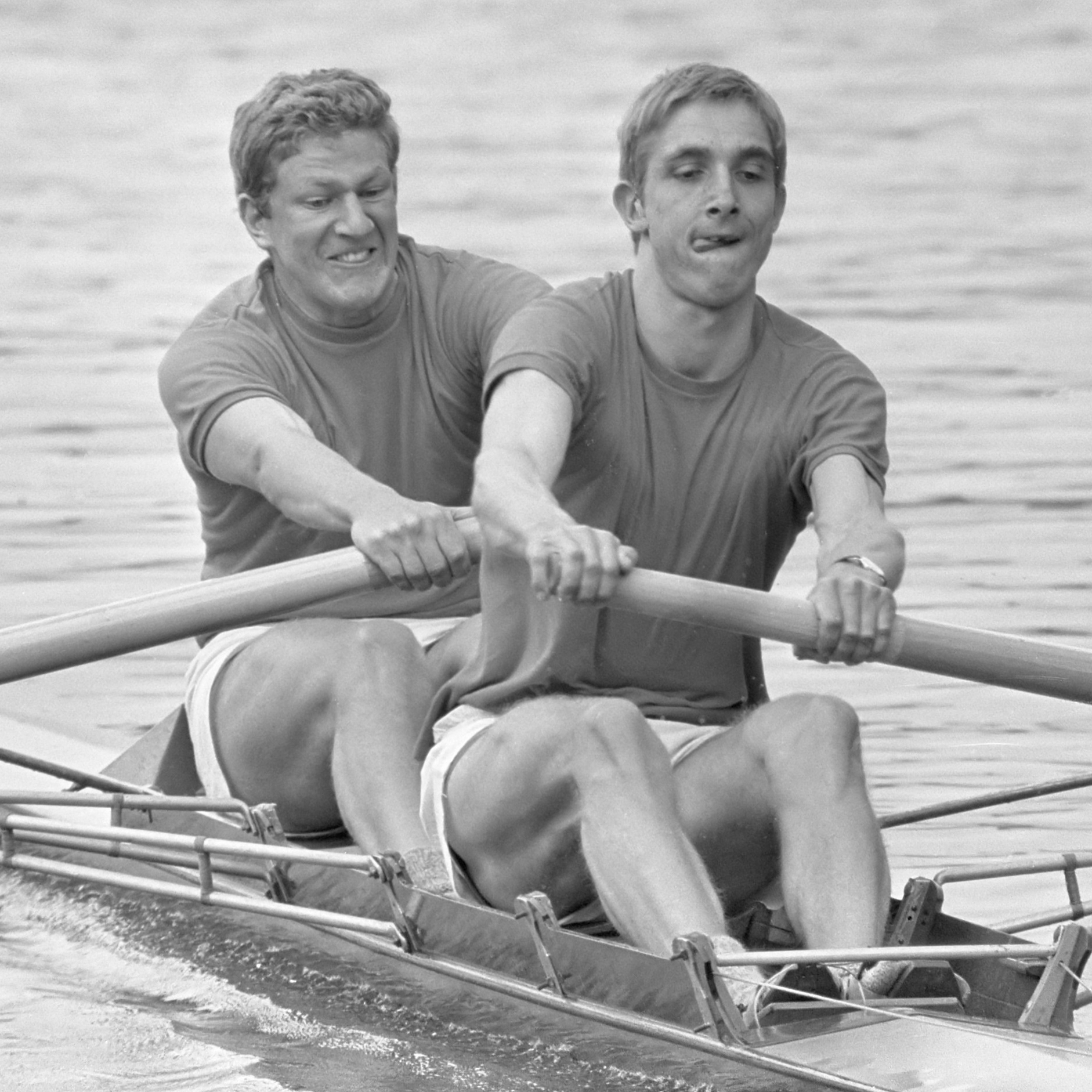
A sweep boat (coxless pair)

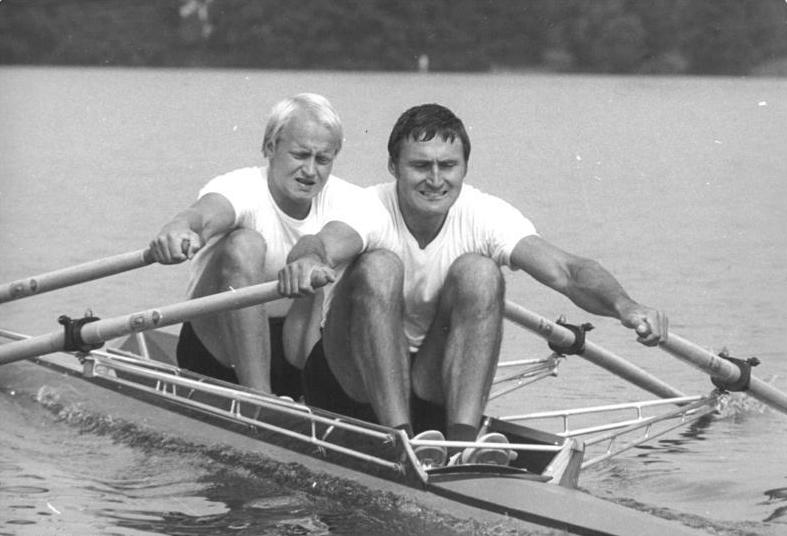
A sculling boat (double sculls)

Broadly, there are two ways to row, sometimes called disciplines:

- In sweep rowing, each rower has one oar, held with both hands. There are an even number of rowers – two, four or eight. Each rower's oar will extend to their port or starboard. In the United Kingdom, the port side is referred to as stroke side and the starboard side as bow side; this applies even if the stroke oarsman is rowing on the bow side and/or the bow oarsman on the stroke side.
- In sculling each rower has two oars (or sculls), one in each hand. Sculling is usually done without a coxswain in quads, doubles or singles, though coxed quads and octs are competed at junior levels. The oar in the sculler's right hand extends to port and the oar in the left hand extends to starboard.

Within each discipline, there are several boat classes. A single regatta (series of races) will often feature races for many boat classes. They are classified using:

- Number of rowers: in all forms of modern competition the number is 1, 2, 4, or 8.
- Whether there is a coxswain (also referred to as cox). Coxless sweep boats are sometimes called "straight", while sculling boats are assumed to be coxless unless stated otherwise.

Although sweep and sculling boats are generally identical to each other (except having different riggers), they are referred to using different names:

Sweep boat classes:

Boat abbreviation	Boat class
2-	Coxless pair (or "straight pair" or "pair")
2+	Coxed pair
4-	Coxless four (or "straight four")
4+	Coxed four
8+	Eight (always coxed)

Sculling boat classes:

Boat abbreviation	Boat class
1x	Single sculls (or "single" or "scull")
2x	Double sculls (or "double")
4x	Coxless quadruple sculls (or "quad")
4x+	Coxed quadruple sculls ("coxed quad", usually for juniors)
8x+	Octuple sculls (always coxed, usually for juniors and exhibition)

== Equipment ==
=== Racing shell ===
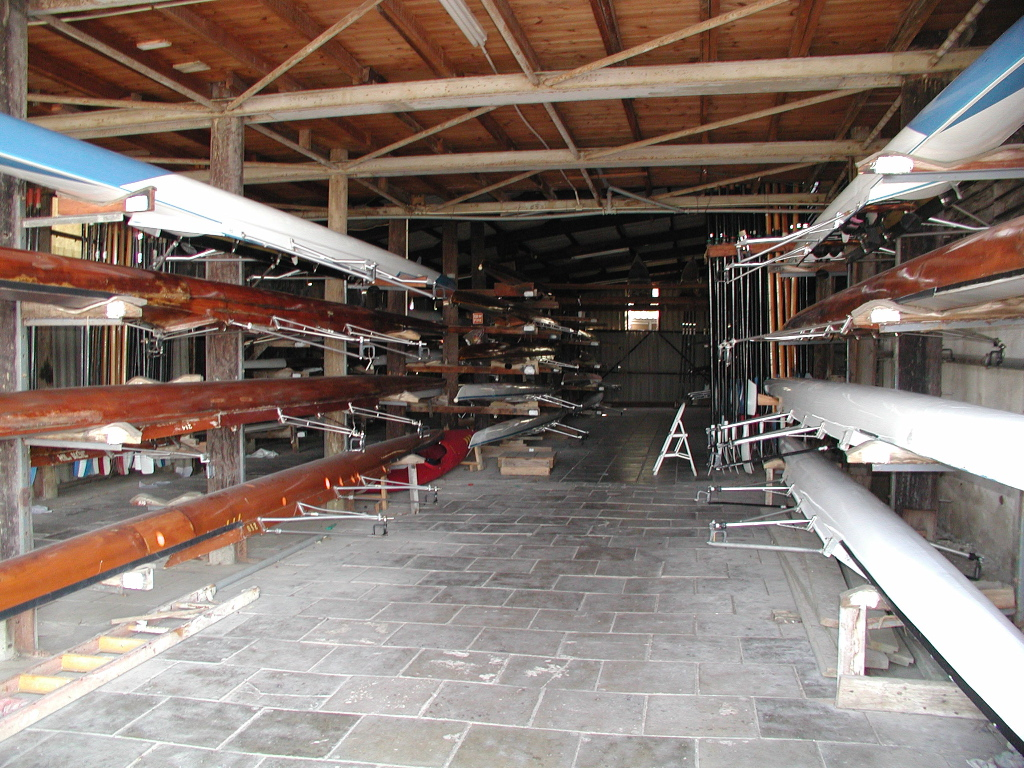
Racing shells stored in a boathouse.

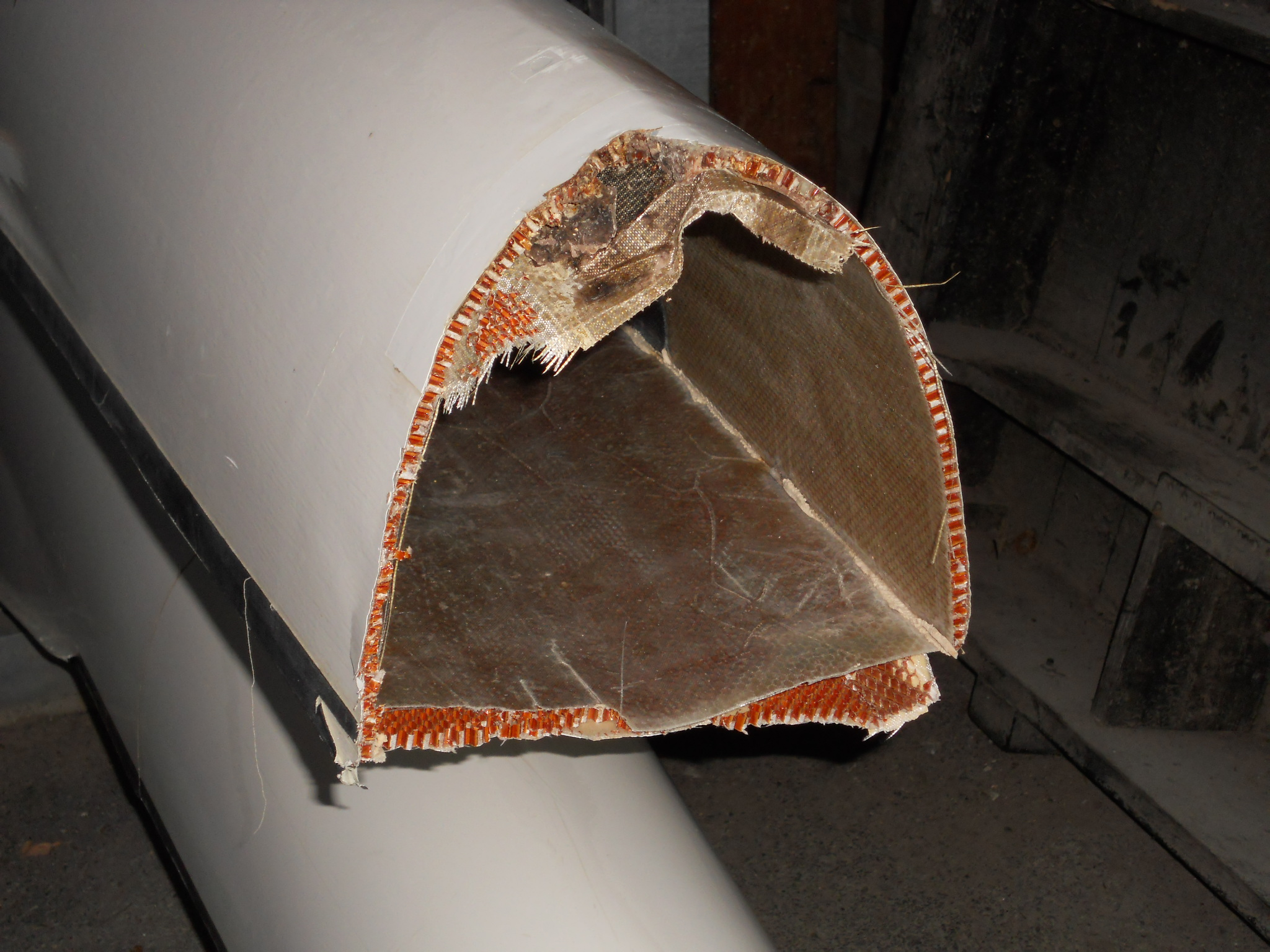
A damaged 8+, showing cross section near the bows and the skin construction.

Racing boats (often called shells) are long, narrow, and broadly semi-circular in cross-section in order to reduce drag in the water. There is some trade off between boat speed and stability in choice of hull shape. They usually have a fin towards the rear, to help prevent roll and yaw and to increase the effectiveness of the rudder.

Originally made from wood, the design of racing craft was refined over time through competitive racing. Shells are now almost always made from a composite material (usually a double skin of carbon-fiber reinforced plastic with a sandwich of honeycomb material) for strength and weight advantages. World Rowing rules specify minimum weights for each class of boat so that no individual team will gain a great advantage from the use of expensive materials or technology.

Smaller sculling boats are usually steered by the scullers pulling harder on one side or the other while larger boats often have a rudder, controlled by the coxswain, if present, or by one of the crew using a cable attached to one of the shoes.

With the smaller boats, specialist versions of the shells for sculling can be made lighter. The riggers in sculling apply the forces symmetrically to each side of the boat, whereas in sweep oared racing these forces are staggered alternately along the boat. The sweep oared boat has to be stiffer to handle these unmatched forces, so consequently requires more bracing and is usually heavier – a pair (2-) is usually a more robust boat than a double scull (2x) for example, and being heavier is also slower when used as a double scull. In theory, this could also apply to the 4x and 8x, but most rowing clubs cannot afford to have a dedicated large hull which might be rarely used and instead generally opt for versatility in their fleet by using stronger shells which can be rigged for either sweep rowing or sculling. The symmetrical forces also make sculling more efficient than sweep rowing: the double scull is faster than the coxless pair, and the quadruple scull is faster than the coxless four.

Many adjustments can be made to the equipment to accommodate the physiques of the crew. Collectively these adjustments are known as the boat's rigging.

=== Oar ===
Oars, sometimes referred to as blades, are used to propel the boat. They are long (sculling: 250–300 cm; sweep oar: 340–360 cm) poles with one flat end about 50 cm long and 25 cm wide, called the spoon. Classic blades were made out of wood, but modern blades are made from more expensive and durable synthetic material, the most common being carbon fiber.

An 'oar' is often referred to as a blade in the case of sweep oar rowing and as a scull in the case of sculling. A sculling oar is shorter and has a smaller spoon area than the equivalent sweep oar. The combined spoon area of a pair of sculls is however greater than that of a single sweep oar, so the oarsman when sculling is working against more water than when rowing sweep-oared. They are able to do this because the body action in sculling is more anatomically efficient (due to the symmetry).

The spoon of oars is normally painted with the colours of the club to which they belong. This greatly simplifies identification of boats at a distance. As many sports teams have logos printed on their jerseys, rowing clubs have specifically painted blades that each team is associated with.

=== Training equipment ===
Indoor rowing (on indoor rower, or rowing tank) is a way to train technique and strength by going through the same motions as rowing, with resistance(usually a large tank of water). Indoor rowing is helpful when there are no rowable bodies of water near by, or weather conditions don't permit rowing. Indoor rowing has also become a staple in many home and commercial gyms, thanks to its accessibility and efficiency as a cardio and strength workout.

A rowing tank is an indoor facility which attempts to mimic the conditions rowers face on open water. Rowing tanks are used primarily for off-season rowing, muscle-specific conditioning and technique training, or simply when bad weather prevents open-water training.

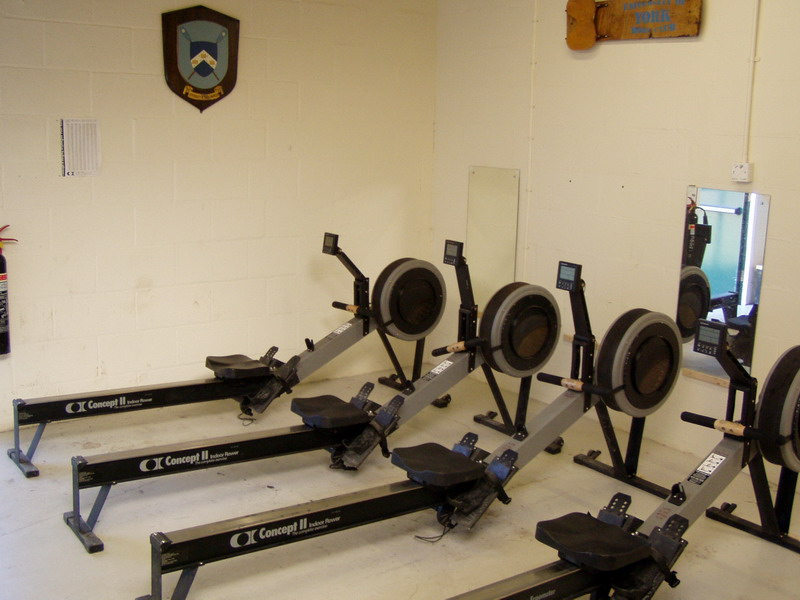
A row of Concept2 "Model C" ergometers

Ergometer rowing machines (colloquially ergs or ergo) simulate the rowing action and provide a means of training on land when waterborne training is restricted, and of measuring rowing fitness. Ergometers do not simulate the lateral balance challenges, the exact resistance of water, or the exact motions of true rowing including the sweep of the oar handles. For that reason ergometer scores are generally not used as the sole selection criterion for crews (colloquially "ergs don't float"), and technique training is limited to the basic body position and movements. However, this action can still allow a workout comparable to those experienced on the water. Indoor rowing has become popular as a sport in its own right with numerous indoor competitions (and the annual World Championship CRASH-B Sprints in Boston) during the winter off-season.

On water rowing utilizes technology that attaches to the boat and used a GPS system. In sculling boats, the equipment to view stroke rate, time, distance, and split is the SpeedCoach. In sweeping boats with coxswains, the coxswains have a cox box which allows them to see distance, time, meters, and split, as well as amplify their voices through microphones.

== Race formats ==
There are several formats for rowing races, often called "regattas". The two most common are side by side and head races.

=== Side by side ===
Most races that are held in the spring and summer feature side-by-side, (Note: "Side-by-side" is the term used in the British Rowing Rules of Racing.) or sprint (Note: "Sprint race" is the term used in the USRowing Rules of Rowing.) racing; all the boats start at the same time from a stationary position, and the winner is the boat that crosses the finish line first. The number of boats in a race typically varies between two (which is sometimes referred to as a dual race) and eight, but any number of boats can start together if the course is wide enough.

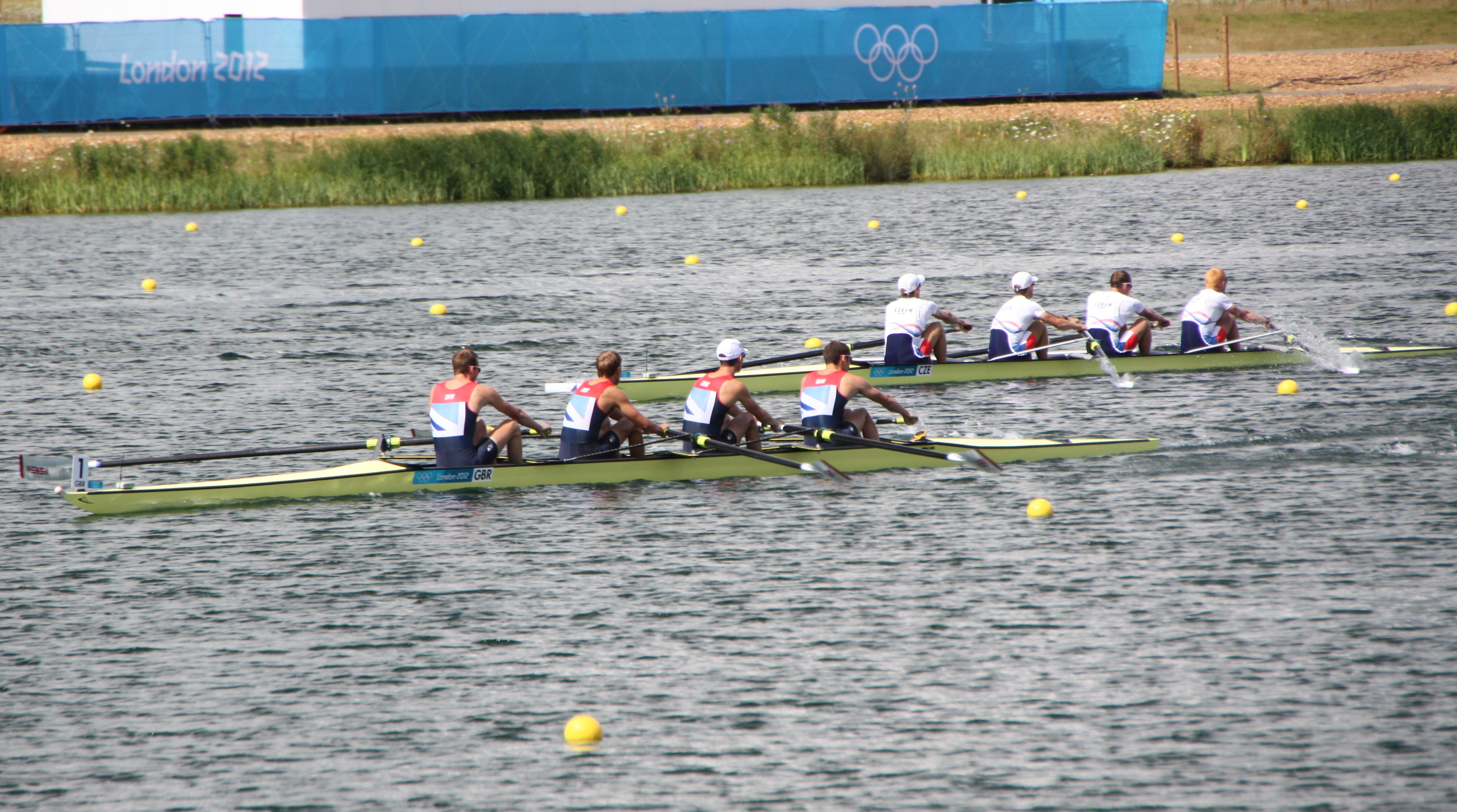
A side by side race at the 2012 Olympic Games – Men's lightweight coxless four

The standard length races for the Olympics and the World Rowing Championships is 2 kilometres (1.24 mi) long. In the United States, some scholastic (high school) races are 1.5 kilometres (0.93 mi), while many youth races are the standard 2 kilometres. Masters rowers (rowers older than 27) often race 1,000m. However the race distance can and does vary from dashes or sprints, which may be 500 metres (1,640 ft) long, to longer dual races like the 6.8 kilometres (4.2 mi) Boat Race.

Non-standard distance side-by-side racing is often held over arbitrary distances dictated by historic tradition dating before standardisation of race distances. For example, some traditional non-standard distance side-by-side races include the annual Boat Race between Oxford and Cambridge, and the Harvard-Yale Boat Race, which cover courses of approximately 4 miles (6.44 km). Furthermore, the Henley Royal Regatta is raced upon a distance of 2,112 meters (1 mile, 550 yards).

In general, side-by-side competitions are organized in a series of rounds, with the fastest boats in each heat qualifying for the next round. The losing boats from each heat may be given a second chance to qualify through a repechage. The World Rowing Championships offers multi-lane racing in heats, finals and repechages. At Henley Royal Regatta, two crews compete side by side in each round, in a straightforward knock-out format, with no repechages.

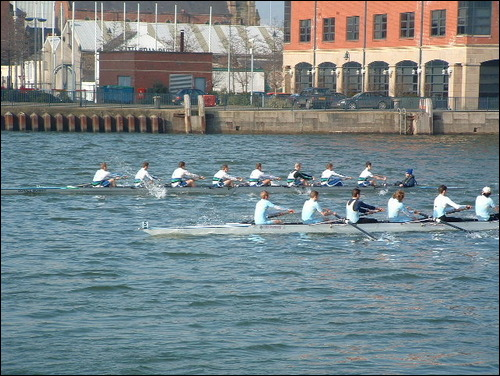
Two crews racing in the annual Lagan Head of the River, Belfast. The closer boat is being overtaken by the boat on the far side.

=== Head races ===
Head races are time trial / processional races that take place from autumn (fall) to early spring (depending on local conditions). Boats begin with a rolling start at intervals of 10 – 20 seconds, and are timed over a set distance. Head courses usually vary in length from 2,000 metres (1.24 mi) to 12,000 metres (7.46 mi), though there are longer races such as the Boston Rowing Marathon and shorter such as Pairs Head.

The oldest, and arguably most famous, head race is the Head of the River Race, founded by Steve Fairbairn in 1926 which takes place each March on the river Thames in London, United Kingdom. Head racing was exported to the United States in the 1950s, and the Head of the Charles Regatta held each October on the Charles River in Boston, Massachusetts, United States is now the largest rowing event in the world.

These processional races are known as Head Races, because, as with bumps racing, the fastest crew is awarded the title Head of the River (as in "head of the class"). It was not deemed feasible to run bumps racing on the Tideway, so a timed format was adopted and soon caught on.

Time trials are sometimes used to determine who competes in an event where there is a limited number of entries, for example, the qualifying races for Henley Royal Regatta, and rowing on and getting on for the Oxford and Cambridge Bumps races respectively.

=== Other race formats ===
A "bump" during Torpids at the University of Oxford, 1999: Jesus College Men's 1st VIII catch Hertford College.

A bumps race is a multi-day race beginning with crews lined up along the river at set intervals. They start simultaneously and all pursue the boat ahead while avoiding being bumped by a boat from behind. If a crew overtakes or makes physical contact with the crew ahead, a bump is awarded. As a result, damage to boats and equipment is common during bumps racing. To avoid damage the cox of the crew being bumped may concede the bump before contact is actually made. The next day, the bumping crew will start ahead of any crews that have been bumped. The positions at the end of the last race are used to set the positions on the first day of the races the next year. Oxford and Cambridge Universities hold bumps races for their respective colleges twice a year, and there are also Town Bumps races in both cities, open to non-university crews. Oxford's races are organised by City of Oxford Rowing Club and Cambridge's are organised by the Cambridgeshire Rowing Association.

The stake format was often used in early American races. Competitors line up at the start, race to a stake, moored boat, or buoy some distance away, and return. The 180° turn requires mastery of steering. These races are popular with spectators because one may watch both the start and finish. Usually only two boats would race at once to avoid collision. The Green Mountain Head Regatta continues to use the stake format, but it is run as a head race with an interval start. A similar type of racing is found in UK and Irish coastal rowing, where a number of boats race out to a given point from the coast and then return fighting rough water all the way. In Irish coastal rowing the boats are in individual lanes with the races consisting of up to 3 turns to make the race distance 2.3 km.

== Boat positions ==
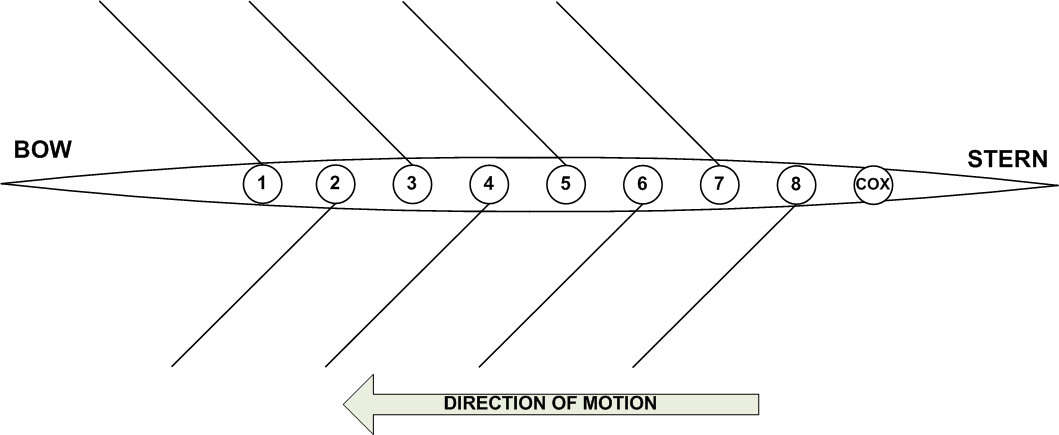
The boat positions within an 8+ rowing shell

Rowers in multi-rower boats are numbered sequentially from the bow aft. The number-one rower is called the bowman, or just 'bow', whilst the rower closest to the stern is called the 'strokeman' or just 'stroke'. There are some exceptions to this – some UK coastal rowers, and in France, Spain, and Italy rowers number from stern to bow.

In addition to this, certain crew members have other titles and roles. In an 8+ the stern pair are responsible for setting the stroke rate and rhythm for the rest of the boat to follow. The middle four (sometimes called the "engine room" or "power house") are usually the less technical, but more powerful rowers in the crew, whilst the bow pair are the more technical and generally regarded as the pair to set up the balance of the boat. They also have most influence on the line the boat steers.

=== Coxswain ===
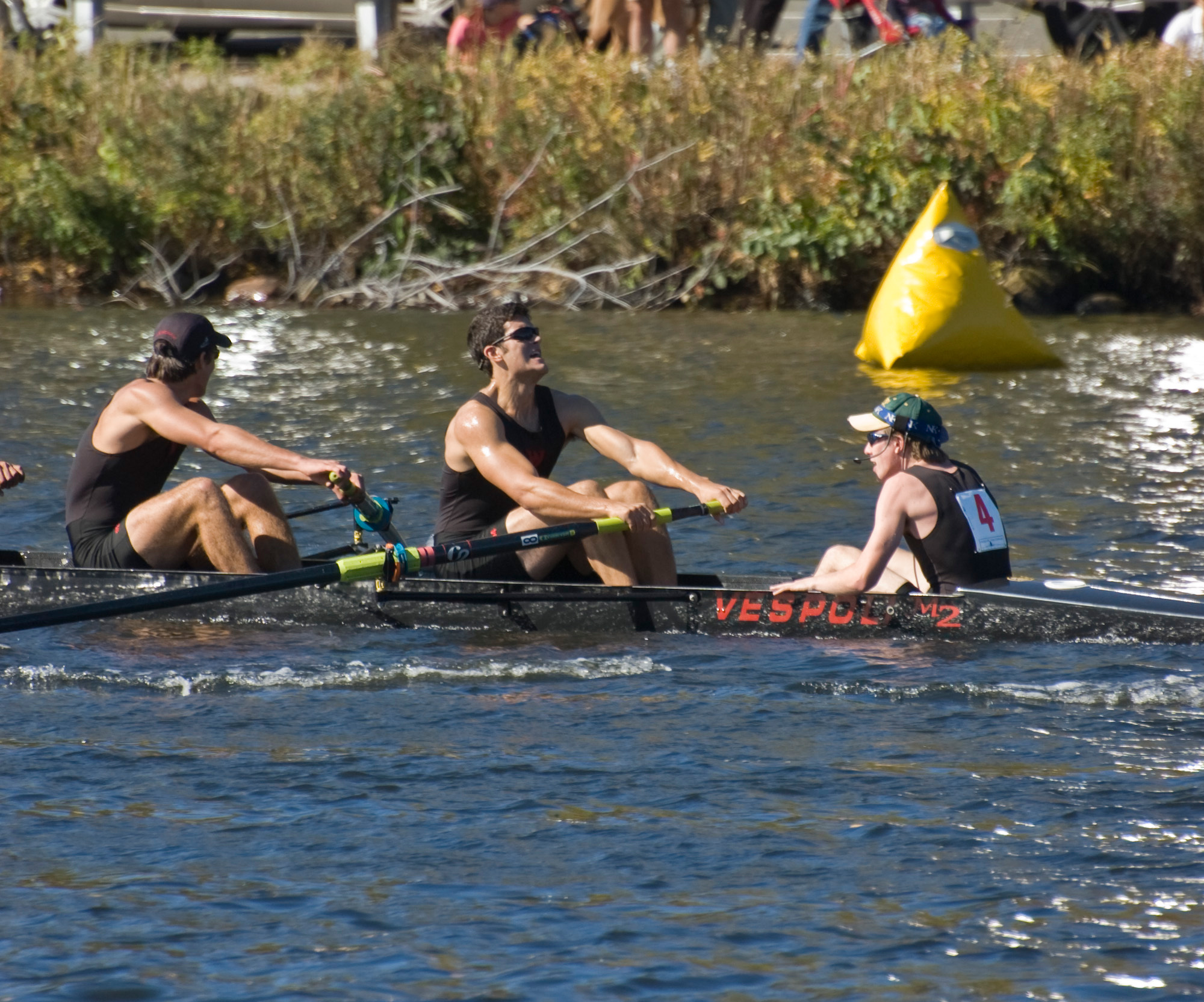
A coxswain (far right) sitting in the stern of the boat, facing the rowers, at the Head of the Charles Regatta.

The coxswain (or simply the cox) is the member who steers the boat using a pulley system connected to the rudder, and coordinates the power and rhythm of the rowers, by communicating to the crew, often through a device called a cox box and speakers. The cox is often tasked with managing the strategy of a race. The cox usually sits in the stern of the boat facing the rowers, but in bowloaders, usually seen in the coxed four and coxed pair boat classes the coxswain lies in the bow.

It is an advantage for the coxswain to be light as this requires less effort for the crew to propel the boat. In many competitive events there is a minimum weight, 55 kilograms (121 lb) under World Rowing rules, set for the coxswain to prevent unfair advantage and protect the health of coxswains. If a coxswain is under the minimum weight allowance (underweight), they may have to carry ballast in the boat such as sandbags to match the minimum weight. Carrying ballast is not preferable to being "on weight" as the ballast necessarily is dead weight, which is much more difficult to row with than with "active weight" i.e. the ability of the coxswain to move with the momentum of the boat by bracing themselves.

== Athlete categories ==
=== Age ===
At the elite level, the World Rowing Federation recognizes an under 19 category for athletes who are age 18 or less by the end of the calendar year for a given event. The World Rowing Junior Championships is the world championship event for this category. Athletes under 23 years of age by the end of the calendar year may compete in the under 23 category, and the World Rowing U23 Championships is held for these athletes. World Rowing uses the term "Senior" for events open to any age.

Under World Rowing rules, athletes may compete in "Masters" categories when they reach age 27. World Rowing holds the World Rowing Masters Regatta for these athletes, at which there are several age subcategories.

=== Weight ===
Lightweight boat classes are restricted by the rowers' weight. According to the World Rowing Federation, this weight category was introduced "to encourage more universality in the sport especially among nations with less statuesque people". The first lightweight events were held at the World Championships in 1974 for men and 1985 for women. Lightweight rowing was added to the Olympics in 1996. As of 2021, the only Olympic lightweight boat classes are the men's and women's double sculls. Starting with the 2028 Olympic games, lightweight rowing will no longer have any events in the Olympics.

The World Rowing Federation lightweight standards are:

- Men: Crew average 70 kilograms (150 lb) – no rower over 72.5 kilograms (160 lb)
- Women: Crew average 57 kilograms (126 lb) – no rower over 59 kilograms (130 lb)

Different governing bodies may offer different weight requirements depending on the level or competitive season. For example, at the collegiate level in the United States, the lightweight cutoff in the fall season is 165 lb for men and 135 lb for women. For juniors in the United States, the lightweight cutoff is 150 lb for men and 130 lb for women.

Similarly, in the UK there is no crew average for the winter season, and the cutoffs for individual rowers are 75 kg for men and 61.5 kg for women.

=== Pararowing ===
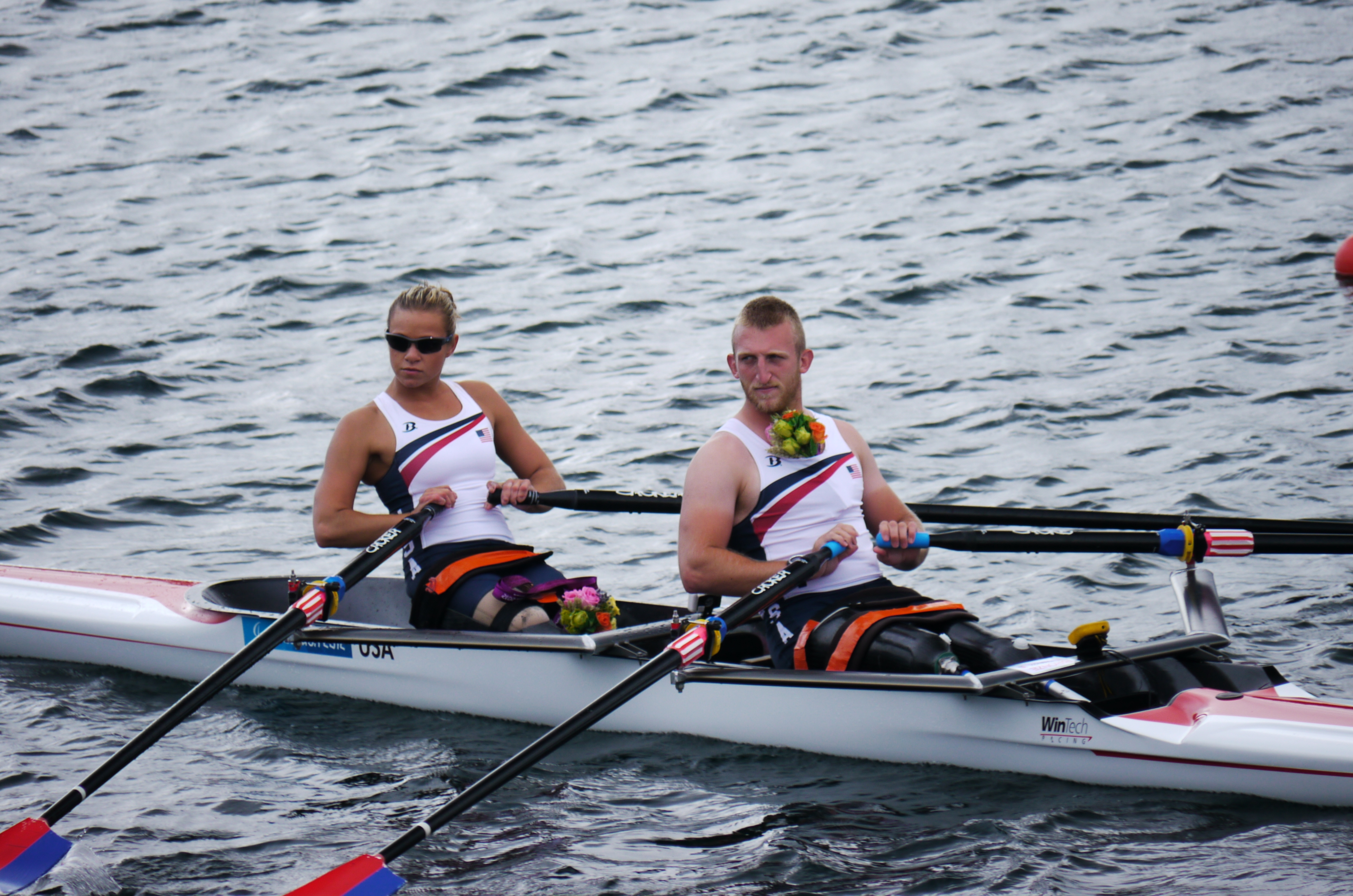
Oksana Masters & Rob Jones of the US in the mixed sculls (TA 2x) final at the Paralympics, London 2012. The rowers are fixed to the seat.

Adaptive rowing is a special category of races for those with physical disabilities. Under World Rowing rules there are five boat classes for adaptive rowers; mixed (two men and two women plus cox) PR3 (previously LTA – Legs, Trunk, Arms), mixed intellectual disability (two men and two women plus cox) PR2 (previously TA – Trunk and Arms), mixed (1 man and 1 woman) TA (Trunk and Arms), and men's and women's PR1 (previously AS – Arms and Shoulders). Events are held at the World Rowing Championships and were also held at the 2008 Summer Paralympics.

== Governing bodies ==
The World Rowing Federation, known as FISA until recently, is the sport's international governing body. World Rowing runs the World Rowing Championships, as well as several other international elite competitions including the World Rowing Cup and World Rowing Junior Championships. World Rowing also sponsors rowing at the Olympics.

World Rowing has over 155 national member federations who govern the sport in their respective nations.

== International competitions ==
The Olympic Games are held every four years, where only select boat classes are raced (14 in total):

- Men: quad scull, double scull, single scull, eight, coxless four, and coxless pair
- Lightweight Men: double scull (discontinued after 2024 games)
- Women: quad scull, double scull, single scull, eight, coxless four, and coxless pair
- Lightweight Women: double scull (discontinued after 2024 games)
- Coastal rowing (from 2028)

At the end of each year, the World Rowing Federation holds the World Rowing Championships with events in 22 different boat classes. Athletes generally consider the Olympic classes to be premier events. In 2017 FISA (now the World Rowing Federation) voted to adopt a new Olympic programme for 2020, whereby the lightweight men's coxless four event was replaced by the women's heavyweight coxless four. This was done to ensure that rowing had a gender equal Olympic programme. During Olympic years only non-Olympic boats compete at the World Championships.

== Fitness and health ==
Rowing is one of the few bearing sports that exercises all the major muscle groups, including quads, biceps, triceps, lats, glutes and abdominal muscles. The sport also improves cardiovascular endurance and muscular strength. High-performance rowers tend to be tall and muscular: although extra weight does increase the drag on the boat, the larger athletes' increased power tends to compensate. The increased power is achieved through the increased leverage on the oar provided by the longer limbs of the athlete. In multi-person boats (2,4, or 8), the lightest person typically rows in the bow seat at the front of the boat. Rowing is a low-impact sport with movement only in defined ranges, so that twist and sprain injuries are rare. However, the repetitive rowing action can put strain on knee joints, the spine and the tendons of the forearm, and inflammation of these are the most common rowing injuries. If one rows with poor technique, especially rowing with a curved rather than straight back, other injuries may surface, including back pains and wrist injuries. Blisters occur for almost all rowers, especially in the beginning of one's rowing career, as every stroke puts pressure on the hands, though rowing frequently tends to harden hands and generate protective calluses. Holding the oars too tightly or making adjustments to technique may cause recurring or new blisters, as it is common to feather the blade. Another common injury is getting "track bites", thin cuts on the back of one's calf or thigh caused by contact with the seat tracks at either end of the stroke.

== Psychological effects ==
Recent academic research highlights rowing's many psychological benefits. These mental effects enhance athletic performance but also the well-being and social connection of people. Rowing has been linked to enhanced pain tolerance due to the synchronized, rhythmic nature of crew movements-A phenomenon called a "rower's high". Research by Bahna and Lang found that synchrony in physical activity raises pain tolerance and boosts cooperative behavior, suggesting that synchrony enhances social cohesion and physiological resilience. The synchronization gives a sense of trust and cohesion, reinforcing the idea that rowing is not just about physical strength, but social and psychological resilience. Daniel James Brown writes in The Boys in the Boat, "Rowing then becomes a kind of perfect language. Poetry, that's what a good swing feels like." During these moments the boat glides effortlessly, and pain becomes less because of shared exultation, creating a rare blend of physical mastery and emotional harmony.

Similarly, David Halberstam's The Amateurs explores how rowers experience these peak moments as internal victories, saying "Every race was as much a race against yourself as it was against opponents. Crew was always imperfect; no matter how good your crew, you were bound to lose, if not a race, then the ephemeral feeling of swing, when a boat was moving perfectly." Illustrating how rowing draws athletes into a special psychological state, balancing ambition with vulnerability, in the pursuit of a meditative synchrony.

Beyond the moments of swing, rowing also creates significant psychological resilience. Studies published in Frontiers in Sports and Active Living showed that the sport's intense exertion builds mental toughness, focus, and perseverance. Together, these findings suggest that rowing contributes to mental health by promoting psychological strength, social cohesion, and positive emotional states.

The discipline required creates a strong sense of identity and self regulation among athletes. Rowers often report that the sport teaches patience, delayed gratification, and the ability to deal with setbacks. Psychological research on endurance sports has shown that the repetitive nature of the sport, pared with the precision, creates the idea of "psychological flexibility"

== See also ==
- Glossary of rowing terms
- Rowing at the Summer Olympics
- The Championship Course
- World Sculling Championship (Professional)

International Rowing Federation events

- Rowing World Cup
- World Rowing Championships
- World Rowing Junior Championships

College/university rowing

- College rowing (United States)
- Harvard–Yale Regatta
- The Boat Race
- The Great Race (rowing) (New Zealand)
- University rowing (UK)
- U.S. intercollegiate rowing champions
- Varsity (rowing regatta) (Netherlands)
- George Watson's College Rowing Club (UK)
