= Bowloader =

Type of boat used in rowing

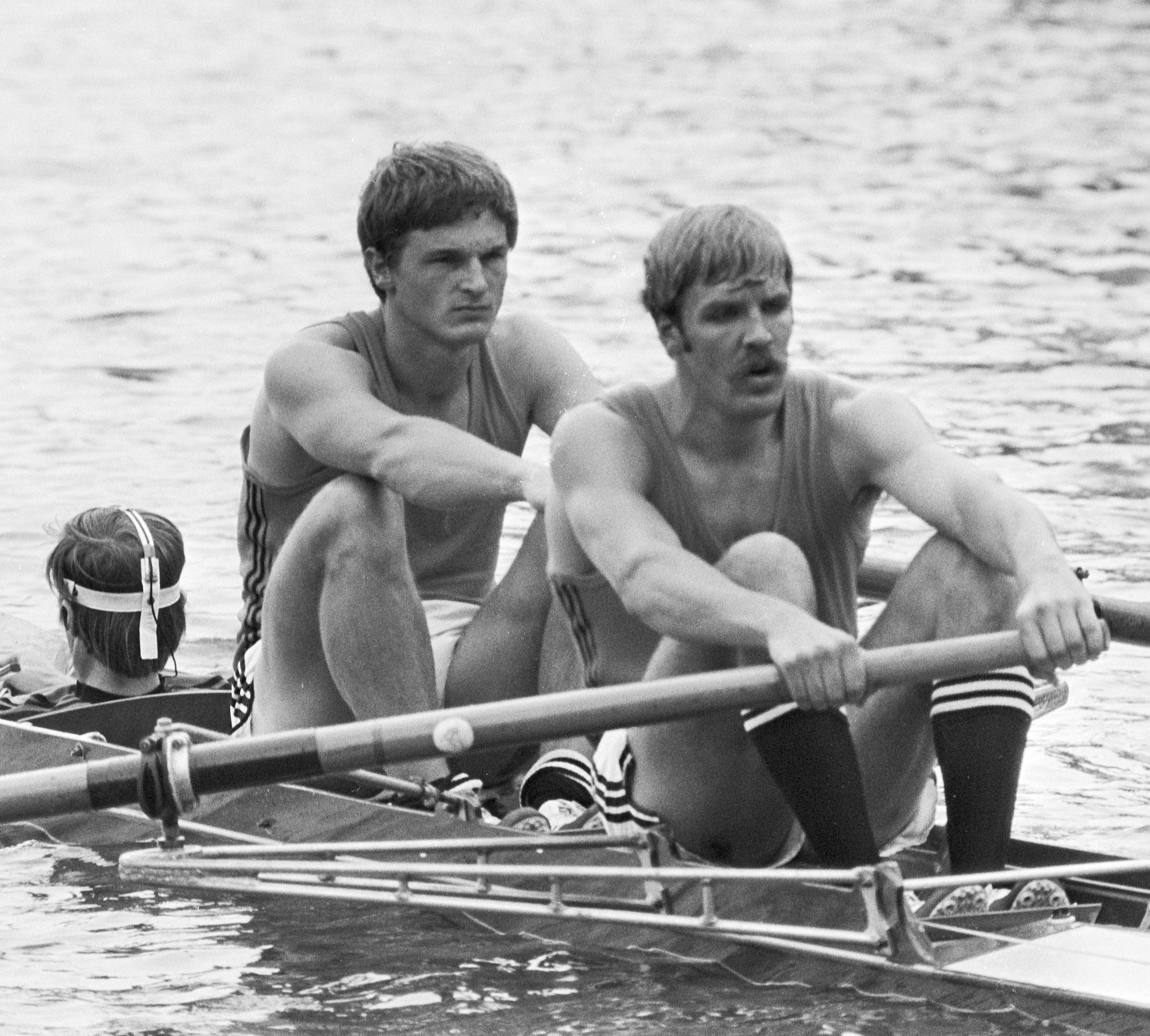
The Dutch coxed pair at the 1977 World Rowing Championships, Evert Kroes and Peter van de Pas with coxswain Poul de Haan in the bow

A bowloader or bow-coxed shell is a racing shell (a type of boat used in rowing) in which the coxswain lies semi-supine in the bow, as opposed to the normal seated position at the stern.

Bowloaders are often seen as coxed fours and also coxed pairs. A small number of bowloader eights exist, and one was raced by the Soviet Union in the 1988 Olympics and the 1989 Royal Henley Regatta, as well as the Russian men's crew at the 2002 World Rowing Junior Championships. Steering is difficult because the bow swings less than the stern, so that the coxswain has trouble judging how much the boat has moved laterally, and this problem is exacerbated in an eight.

A bowloader is slightly faster than a stern-coxed boat, since the mass of the coxswain in the bow reduces porpoising, and the semi-supine position puts the coxswain's center of mass below the waterline, reducing roll. Both of these factors help to reduce drag. The cox also has better forward vision in a bowloader: in the conventional stern position the cox cannot see directly ahead.

Novice coxswains often have difficulty with bowloaders, however, since the rowers and their oars cannot easily be seen. Experienced coxswains learn how to feel the movements of the rowers in the boat, as well as visualising the position of the shell itself to safely and effectively maneuver it.

Bowloaders require an amplifier (usually using a cox box) and loudspeakers, to be used so that the cox can communicate with the crew, and unlike in the conventional coxing position there is no opportunity for personal communication between cox and stroke on race tactics.
