= Rowing at the 1984 Summer Olympics – Women's single sculls =

Women's single sculls at the Games of the XXIII Olympiad
- Venue: Lake Casitas
- Date: 30 July – 4 August 1984
- Competitors: 16 from 16 nations
- Winning time: 3:40.68

Medalists
1st place, gold medalist(s)		Valeria Răcilă	Romania
2nd place, silver medalist(s)		Charlotte Geer	United States
3rd place, bronze medalist(s)		Ann Haesebrouck	Belgium

The women's single sculls (W1x) rowing competition at the 1984 Summer Olympics took place at Lake Casitas in Ventura County, California, United States. It was held from 30 July to 4 August.

== Background ==
Like some other rowing events at the 1984 Summer Olympics, the women's single sculls event was influenced by the absence of strong competitors due to the Soviet Bloc boycott. The last two world champions from the Soviet Union and East Germany were absent; Irina Fetisova of the Soviet Union had won the 1982 World Rowing Championships in Switzerland, and East German Jutta Behrendt had become world champion in 1983. Sanda Toma, the winner of the 1980 Olympic event and 1981 world champion, had since retired. World championship medallists competing in this event were Beryl Mitchell from Great Britain, who had come second in 1981, and Valeria Răcilă of Romania and Stephanie Foster of New Zealand, who had won silver and bronze in 1982, respectively. Of all those, the Romanian was regarded as the favourite. Another competitor to be regarded as one of the favourites was María Fernanda de la Fuente of Mexico, who had come second in the 1983 Pan American Games.

=== Previous W1x competitions ===
Competition	Gold	Silver	Bronze
1980 Summer Olympics	Romania; Sanda Toma	Soviet Union; Antonina Makhina	East Germany; Martina Schröter
1981 World Rowing Championships	Romania; Sanda Toma	Great Britain; Beryl Mitchell	Soviet Union; Irina Fetisova
1982 World Rowing Championships	Soviet Union; Irina Fetisova	Romania; Valeria Răcilă	New Zealand; Stephanie Foster
1983 World Rowing Championships	East Germany; Jutta Behrendt	Soviet Union; Irina Fetisova	United States; Virginia Gilder

== Results ==
=== Heats ===
The winner of each heat advanced to the semi-finals. All others went to the repechage. The heats were raced on 30 July.

==== Heat 1 ====
Rank	Rower	Country	Time	Notes
1	Charlotte Geer	United States	3:45.05	SF
2	Andrea Schreiner	Canada	3:48.20	R
3	Jos Compaan	Netherlands	3:54.70	R
4	Astrid Unger	Austria	3:54.96	R
5	Ursula Brauch	West Germany	3:59.67	R
6	Jacqui Marshall	Australia	4:07.06	R

==== Heat 2 ====
Rank	Rower	Country	Time	Notes
1	Beryl Mitchell	Great Britain	3:45.18	SF
2	Ann Haesebrouck	Belgium	3:45.67	R
3	Lise Justesen	Denmark	3:50.15	R
4	Antonella Corazza	Italy	3:55.17	R
5	Annelie Larsson	Sweden	3:56.73	R

==== Heat 3 ====
Rank	Rower	Country	Time	Notes
1	Valeria Răcilă	Romania	3:44.22	SF
2	Stephanie Foster	New Zealand	3:51.86	R
3	María Fernanda de la Fuente	Mexico	3:55.60	R
4	Lisa Scheibert	Norway	3:55.80	R
5	Laurence Hourdel	France	4:00.27	R

=== Repechage ===
The first three of each heat advanced to the semi-final. The remaining rowers were eliminated from the competition. The repechages were raced on 1 August. The Italian rower, Antonella Corazza, did not compete in the repechage, but replaced Paola Grizzetti in the quadruple sculls team instead (in both the repechage on 1 August, and the final on 4 August).

==== Heat 1 ====
Rank	Rower	Country	Time	Notes
1	Ann Haesebrouck	Belgium	3:48.57	SF
2	Annelie Larsson	Sweden	3:50.60	SF
3	Jos Compaan	Netherlands	3:59.29	SF
4	Jacqui Marshall	Australia	4:04.08	

==== Heat 2 ====
Rank	Rower	Country	Time	Notes
1	Andrea Schreiner	Canada	3:52.10	SF
2	María Fernanda de la Fuente	Mexico	3:54.01	SF
3	Lisa Scheibert	Norway	3:56.31	SF
4	Ursula Brauch	West Germany	4:00.20	

==== Heat 3 ====
Rank	Rower	Country	Time	Notes
1	Lise Justesen	Denmark	3:47.60	SF
2	Stephanie Foster	New Zealand	3:51.19	SF
3	Astrid Unger	Austria	3:52.70	SF
4	Laurence Hourdel	France	3:59.60	

=== Semi-finals ===
The top three from each heat advanced to the A final. The others advanced to the B final. The semi-finals were raced on 2 August.

==== Heat 1 ====
Rank	Rower	Country	Time	Notes
1	Valeria Răcilă	Romania	3:54.55	FA
2	Charlotte Geer	United States	3:57.93	FA
3	Andrea Schreiner	Canada	3:59.02	FA
4	Stephanie Foster	New Zealand	4:02.29	FB
5	Lisa Scheibert	Norway	4:04.62	FB
6	Annelie Larsson	Sweden	4:08.39	FB

==== Heat 2 ====
Rank	Rower	Country	Time	Notes
1	Lise Justesen	Denmark	3:55.34	FA
2	Ann Haesebrouck	Belgium	3:56.45	FA
3	Beryl Mitchell	Great Britain	3:56.59	FA
4	Astrid Unger	Austria	3:59.52	FB
5	María Fernanda de la Fuente	Mexico	4:01.77	FB
6	Jos Compaan	Netherlands	4:06.39	FB

=== Finals ===
==== B final ====
The B final was raced on 3 August.

Rank	Rower	Country	Time
7	Stephanie Foster	New Zealand	3:52.20
8	Jos Compaan	Netherlands	3:52.80
9	Astrid Unger	Austria	3:53.08
10	Annelie Larsson	Sweden	3:53.39
11	María Fernanda de la Fuente	Mexico	3:57.93
12	Lisa Scheibert	Norway	4:00.70

==== A final ====
The A final was raced on 4 August.

Rank	Rower	Country	Time
1st place, gold medalist(s)	Valeria Răcilă	Romania	3:40.68
2nd place, silver medalist(s)	Charlotte Geer	United States	3:43.89
3rd place, bronze medalist(s)	Ann Haesebrouck	Belgium	3:45.72
4	Andrea Schreiner	Canada	3:45.97
5	Lise Justesen	Denmark	3:47.79
6	Beryl Mitchell	Great Britain	3:51.20
