= Dreissigacker =

Dreissigacker as a surname may refer to

- Dick Dreissigacker (born 1947), American rower and engineer, co-founder of sports equipment company Concept2
- Emily Dreissigacker (born 1988), American biathlete, daughter of Dick Dreissigacker
- Hannah Dreissigacker (born 1986), American biathlete, daughter of Dick Dreissigacker
- Pete Dreissigacker, American rower and engineer, co-founder of sports equipment company Concept2, brother of Dick Dreissigacker
