= Oar (sport rowing) =

Sport rowing equipment

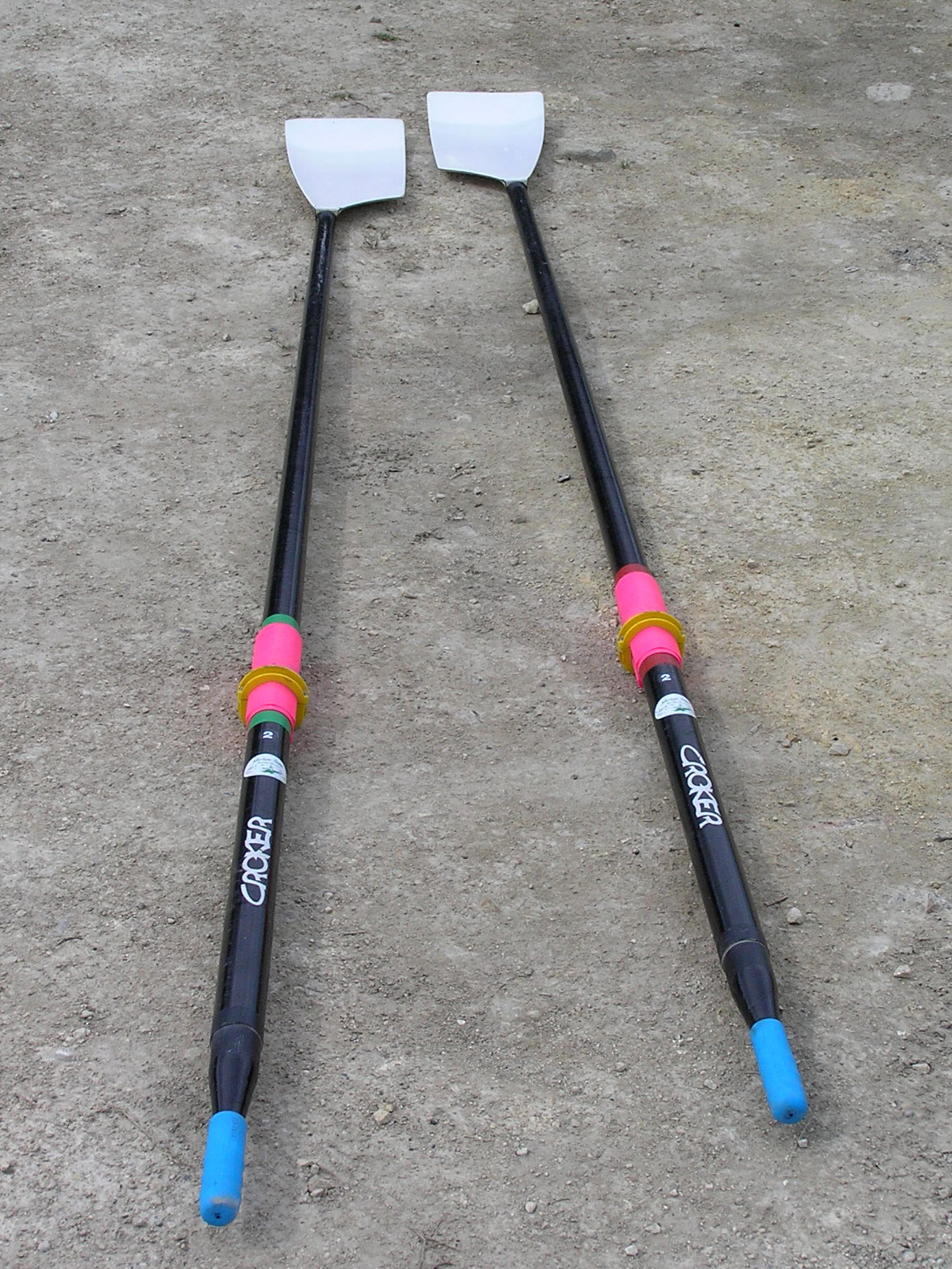
Two "cleaver" sculls. The blades which enter the water are at the top of the picture and the handles are at the bottom. Note how the oar shaft connects not to the midline of the blade (as is the case of macons) but rather higher pitch, that is toward an upper part of the spoon/blade when perpendicular to the waterline.

In rowing, oars are used to propel the boat. Oars differ from paddles in that they use a fixed or sliding fulcrum, an oarlock or rowlock attached to the side of the boat, to transfer power from the handle to the blade, rather than using the athlete's shoulders or hands as the pivot-point as in canoeing and kayaking.

When the rower uses one oar on one side, it is called sweep rowing that the single oar is called a "sweep" oar. When the rower uses two oars at the same time, one on each side, it is called sculling, and the two oars are called a pair of "sculls". Typical sculls are around 284 cm - 290 cm in length — sweep oars are 370 cm - 376 cm. A scull has a smaller blade area, as each rower wields a pair of them at any one time, operating each with one hand. Since the 1980s many oars have been adjustable in length.

The shaft of the oar ends with a thin flat surface 40 to 50 cm long and 25 cm wide, variously called the blade or spoon. Further along are the loom (or shaft), 2/3 of the way up which is the sleeve (including a wearplate) and button (or collar), and at the very end the handle. The handle may revert to wooden or, particularly in the case of sculls and some 21st century models of sweep-oar blades have rubber, cellular foam, suede or for example wood veneer grips over glass fiber.

The part of the oar the rower holds while rowing is the handle which is longer for sweep blades as each is held using both hands, than for sculls which are held with one hand.

There are hundreds of different variations of oars in terms of size and manufacturer specifications. "Macon" or "Cleaver" blade shapes of carbon-fibre are the most common in modern-day rowing. Classic oars were made out of wood. Since the use of such synthetic materials, first mass-produced by the Dreissigacker brothers in 1975, the weight of an oar has come down from over 7 kg to less than 2.5 kg and 1.275-1.8 kg in the case of sculls. While rowing in the most common competitive boats, fine boats (racing shells), oars are since the early part of the 20th century supported by metal, fibreglass or carbon fibre frames attached to the side of the boat called riggers for extra leverage.

== Blade shapes ==
=== Cleaver ===
The most common shape now seen is the "cleaver" (also called "hatchet"), which is used almost universally. Cleaver blades are asymmetrical, with a somewhat rectangular shape resembling a meat cleaver, hence the name. The shaft of a cleaver blade connects to the blade offset to the top corner of the blade. The shape of the face and the offset connection are designed to maximize the surface area of the blade in contact with the water during the rowing stroke, while also minimizing the amount and depth of the shaft that is submerged and contributing to drag. As the cleaver blade is asymmetrical it may only be used on one side of the boat or the other. Technically, this is true of all oars, as the blade sits at a slight angle to the squared off surface on the sleeve. Thus, when the oar is allowed to rest, it is not parallel to the water surface. If used on the wrong side of the boat, the blade would dig into the water rather than skimming across its surface.

Cleaver blade designs were first developed by Dick and Pete Dreissigacker at Concept2. In 1989 they introduced an asymmetric blade with roughly the same blade area as the Macon, but it did not generate much interest. In the 1991 World Championships multiple British teams rowed with asymmetric blades from British company Hi-Lock which again had similar area and oar length to the Macon. This appearance prompted the Dreissigackers to reinvestigate alternative oar designs, and their experiments led to an asymmetric oar with 17% more blade area and a 6cm-10cm shorter oar which they found increased hull speed 2%. They sent demo oars to some US college teams in fall 1991, and Dartmouth's outsized performance in the early 1992 spring season led to widespread adoption: by the end of the 1992 spring season nearly all major US universities were rowing with Concept2's cleavers, and in the 1992 Olympics the majority of teams were using them. Cleaver blades are now manufactured by most major rowing oar suppliers, including Concept2 and Croker.

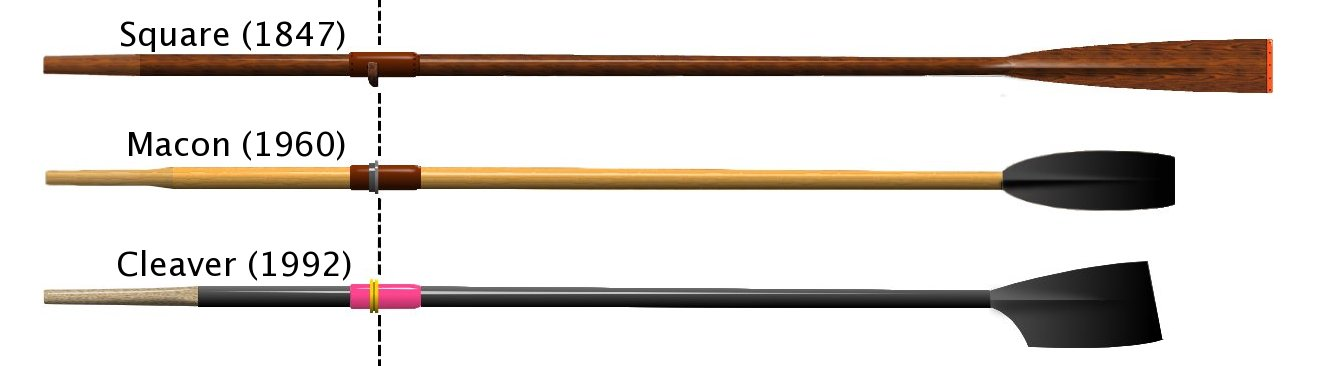
There have been three major types of blades used over the past century. Oars have generally become shorter, and blade area has been increased.

=== Macon ===
Some clubs use the older "macon" style blades (also called "spoons" or "tulips" or "shovels") for novice crews, usually to develop the basic technique of the rower without the extra complexity of a cleaver blade. A minority of coaches favor macons, but it has been generally accepted since their introduction in 1992 that cleavers give a speed advantage over macons under most conditions.

Macon blades are symmetrical, with an elliptical shape and a ridgeline running down the center of the blade face. The blade is squared off at the end. Despite the blade being symmetrical, modern asymmetrical collars or aesthetic issues regarding decorative paint on the blade face may dictate which side of the boat the blade can be rowed on.

Macon blades achieved prominence at the 1959 European Championship in Mâcon when they were used by the West German national team. West Germany won all the male sweep events that year, except the coxless four.

=== Square ===
Before macons a longer, thinner shape was used, known as "square" or "standard" blades. Some rowers of traditional skiffs use them but macons or wider oars dominate in dinghy rowing. A few racing shell clubs/coaches keep some for training for technique in their learner boats.

At any given moment a propelling blade seen stationary, outboard of that point shifts water providing guaranteed drive (linear velocity), and inboard of it relative drag (radial velocity). Shorter, wider blades concentrate the former yet must be in a design not liable to snap. Thus the development from standard to macon to cleaver is a progression from long, thin blades to shorter, wider ones and more durable material. Each stage is a reduction in the solid-2D-profile, current and eddies that, at typical speeds, may work the wrong way and chiefly in a purely radial way in favour of pure lineal velocity.

== See also ==
- List of rowing blades
- F Collar, supplier of oars to every Olympic game from 1952 to 1984
