= Rowing at the 1988 Summer Olympics – Women's single sculls =

Women's single sculls at the Games of the XXIV Olympiad
- Date: 20–25 September 1988
- Competitors: 13 from 13 nations

Medalists
1st place, gold medalist(s)		Jutta Behrendt	East Germany
2nd place, silver medalist(s)		Anne Marden	United States
3rd place, bronze medalist(s)		Magdalena Georgieva	Bulgaria

The women's single sculls competition at the 1988 Summer Olympics took place at took place at Han River Regatta Course, South Korea.

== Competition format ==
The competition consisted of three main rounds (heats, semifinals, and finals) as well as a repechage. The 13 boats were divided into three heats for the first round, with 4 or 5 boats in each heat. The top three boats in each heat (9 boats total) advanced directly to the semifinals. The remaining 4 boats were placed in the repechage. The repechage featured a single heat. The top three boats in each repechage heat advanced to the semifinals, with only the last-place boat eliminated (13th place overall). The 12 semifinalist boats were divided into two heats of 6 boats each. The top three boats in each semifinal (6 boats total) advanced to the "A" final to compete for medals and 4th through 6th place; the bottom three boats in each semifinal were sent to the "B" final for 7th through 12th.

All races were over a 2000 metre course, unlike previous Games in which women used a 1000 metre course.

== Results ==
=== Heats ===
==== Heat 1 ====
Rank	Rower	Nation	Time	Notes
1	Anne Marden	United States	8:01.55	Q
2	Inger Pors Olsen	Denmark	8:09.55	Q
3	Heather Hattin	Canada	8:15.04	Q
4	Michaela Burešová-Loukotová	Czechoslovakia	8:17.80	R
5	Annelie Larsson	Sweden	8:29.70	R

==== Heat 2 ====
Rank	Rower	Nation	Time	Notes
1	Jutta Behrendt	East Germany	7:51.44	Q
2	Marioara Popescu-Ciobanu	Romania	7:53.75	Q
3	Harriet van Ettekoven	Netherlands	7:56.80	Q
4	Nataliya Kvasha	Soviet Union	7:59.95	R

==== Heat 3 ====
Rank	Rower	Nation	Time	Notes
1	Magdalena Georgieva	Bulgaria	7:50.64	Q
2	Rita Defauw	Belgium	8:09.25	Q
3	Tonia Svaier	Greece	8:12.13	Q
4	Lydie Dubedat-Briero	France	8:28.75	R

=== Repechage ===
Rank	Rower	Nation	Time	Notes
1	Nataliya Kvasha	Soviet Union	8:06.11	Q
2	Michaela Burešová-Loukotová	Czechoslovakia	8:15.63	Q
3	Annelie Larsson	Sweden	8:20.20	Q
4	Lydie Dubedat-Briero	France	8:26.86	

=== Semifinals ===
==== Semifinal 1 ====
Rank	Rower	Nation	Time	Notes
1	Jutta Behrendt	East Germany	7:37.69	QA
2	Anne Marden	United States	7:40.51	QA
3	Harriet van Ettekoven	Netherlands	7:48.84	QA
4	Heather Hattin	Canada	7:56.97	QB
5	Rita Defauw	Belgium	8:07.95	QB
6	Annelie Larsson	Sweden	8:11.21	QB

==== Semifinal 2 ====
Rank	Rower	Nation	Time	Notes
1	Magdalena Georgieva	Bulgaria	7:35.47	QA
2	Marioara Popescu-Ciobanu	Romania	7:39.93	QA
3	Inger Pors Olsen	Denmark	7:42.76	QA
4	Nataliya Kvasha	Soviet Union	7:45.50	QB
5	Tonia Svaier	Greece	7:49.15	QB
6	Michaela Burešová-Loukotová	Czechoslovakia	8:08.04	QB

=== Finals ===
==== Final B ====
Rank	Rower	Nation	Time
7	Tonia Svaier	Greece	7:57.73
8	Nataliya Kvasha	Soviet Union	8:00.73
9	Rita Defauw	Belgium	8:04.90
10	Heather Hattin	Canada	8:08.69
11	Annelie Larsson	Sweden	8:11.69
12	Michaela Burešová-Loukotová	Czechoslovakia	8:14.02

==== Final A ====
Rank	Rower	Nation	Time
1st place, gold medalist(s)	Jutta Behrendt	East Germany	7:47.19
2nd place, silver medalist(s)	Anne Marden	United States	7:50.28
3rd place, bronze medalist(s)	Magdalena Georgieva	Bulgaria	7:53.65
4	Harriet van Ettekoven	Netherlands	7:57.29
5	Marioara Popescu-Ciobanu	Romania	7:59.44
6	Inger Pors Olsen	Denmark	7:59.77

== Final classification ==
Rank	Rower	Country
1st place, gold medalist(s)	Jutta Behrendt	East Germany
2nd place, silver medalist(s)	Anne Marden	United States
3rd place, bronze medalist(s)	Magdalena Georgieva	Bulgaria
4	Harriet van Ettekoven	Netherlands
5	Marioara Popescu-Ciobanu	Romania
6	Inger Pors Olsen	Denmark
7	Tonia Svaier	Greece
8	Nataliya Kvasha	Soviet Union
9	Rita Defauw	Belgium
10	Heather Hattin	Canada
11	Annelie Larsson	Sweden
12	Michaela Burešová-Loukotová	Czechoslovakia
13	Lydie Dubedat-Briero	France
