= Dick Dreissigacker =

American rower (born 1947)

Personal information
- Full name: Richard Alan Dreissigacker
- Born: March 26, 1947 (age 79) New Haven, Connecticut, U.S.
- Education: Brown University; Stanford University

Sport
- Country: United States
- Sport: Rowing

Richard Alan Dreissigacker (born March 26, 1947, in New Haven, Connecticut) is a former American Olympic rower and a founder of Concept2, a manufacturer of rowing equipment. While studying engineering at Brown University he took up rowing and went on to represent the United States at the 1972 Summer Olympics.

Dreissigacker earned a Master of Science degree in 1974 from Stanford University, where he coached rowing and introduced his brother Pete to the sport. While training for the 1976 US Olympic team the brothers modified their oars with carbon fibre. After failing to be selected they started selling oars and started the company that is now Concept2.

His wife Julia "Judy" Geer was a rower in the 1976 and 1984 Olympics, and his sister-in-law Charlotte "Carlie" Geer won a silver medal in single sculls in the 1984 Olympics. His daughters, Hannah Dreissigacker and Emily Dreissigacker, competed as biathletes in the 2014 and 2018 Winter Olympics respectively.
