= Rowing at the 1980 Summer Olympics – Women's single sculls =

Women's single sculls at the Games of the XXII Olympiad
- Venue: Krylatskoye Sports Complex Canoeing and Rowing Basin
- Date: 21–26 July 1980
- Competitors: 11 from 11 nations

Medalists
1st place, gold medalist(s)		Sanda Toma	Romania
2nd place, silver medalist(s)		Antonina Makhina	Soviet Union
3rd place, bronze medalist(s)		Martina Schröter	East Germany

The women's single sculls rowing competition at the 1980 Summer Olympics took place at Krylatskoye Sports Complex Canoeing and Rowing Basin, Moscow, Soviet Union. The event was held from 21 to 26 July.

== Heats ==
The two fastest teams in each heat advanced to the semifinals. The remaining teams had to compete in repechage for the remaining spots in the semifinals.

=== Heat One ===
Rank	Athletes Names	Country	Time
1	Sanda Toma	Romania	4:07.20
2	Martina Schröter	East Germany	4:09.76
3	Antonina Makhina	Soviet Union	4:13.39
4	Hette Borrias	Netherlands	4:25.97

=== Heat Two ===
Rank	Athletes Names	Country	Time
1	Beryl Mitchell	Great Britain	4:05.72
2	Mariann Ambrus	Hungary	4:09.55
3	Lise Justesen	Denmark	4:11.94
4	Frances Cryan	Ireland	4:12.16

=== Heat Three ===
Rank	Athletes Names	Country	Time
1	Rositsa Spasova	Bulgaria	4:01.33
2	Beata Dziadura	Poland	4:02.11
3	María Fernanda de la Fuente	Mexico	4:12.84

== Repechage ==
The three fastest teams in the repechage advanced to the semifinals.

Rank	Athletes Names	Country	Time
1	Antonina Makhina	Soviet Union	3:54.10
2	Frances Cryan	Ireland	3:59.17
3	María Fernanda de la Fuente	Mexico	4:00.24
4	Lise Justesen	Denmark	4:00.40
5	Hette Borrias	Netherlands	4:05.39

== Semifinals ==
The three fastest teams in each semifinal advanced to the final.

=== Semifinal One ===
Rank	Athletes Names	Country	Time
1	Sanda Toma	Romania	3:42.63
2	Beryl Mitchell	Great Britain	3:45.88
3	Beata Dziadura	Poland	3:49.06
4	Frances Cryan	Ireland	3:49.22

=== Semifinal Two ===
Rank	Athletes Names	Country	Time
1	Martina Schröter	East Germany	3:42.97
2	Antonina Makhina	Soviet Union	3:43.68
3	Rositsa Spasova	Bulgaria	3:47.86
4	Mariann Ambrus	Hungary	DNF

== Finals ==
=== Finals A ===
Rank	Athletes Names	Country	Time
1st place, gold medalist(s)	Sanda Toma	Romania	3:40.69
2nd place, silver medalist(s)	Antonina Makhina	Soviet Union	3:41.65
3rd place, bronze medalist(s)	Martina Schröter	East Germany	3:43.54
4	Rositsa Spasova	Bulgaria	3:47.22
5	Beryl Mitchell	Great Britain	3:49.71
6	Beata Dziadura	Poland	3:51.45

=== Finals B ===
Rank	Athletes Names	Country	Time
7	Frances Cryan	Ireland	walkover
–	Mariann Ambrus	Hungary	np

=== Finals C ===
Rank	Athletes Names	Country	Time
9	Lise Justesen	Denmark	walkover
–	María Fernanda de la Fuente	Mexico	np
–	Hette Borrias	Netherlands	np

== Sources ==
- I. T. Novikov (ed.). The Official Report of the Games of the XXII Olympiad Moscow 1980 Volume Three (PDF) (PDF). p. 115. Archived from the original (PDF) on 27 September 2007.
