= Brauch =

Brauch is a surname. Notable people with this surname include:

- Kevin Brauch (born 1968), Canadian television presenter
- Liane Russell (1923–2019), American geneticist and conservationist
- Tim Brauch (1974–1999), American skateboarder
- Ursula Brauch (born 1962), German rower
- David Brauch (born 1955), American musician
