= Charlotte Geer =

American rower

Carlie Geer
Personal information
- Full name: Charlotte Mosher Geer
- Born: November 13, 1957 (age 68) Greenwich, Connecticut, U.S.
Medal record
Women's rowing
Representing the United States
Olympic Games
Silver medal – second place	1984 Los Angeles	Single sculls

Charlotte Mosher "Carlie" Geer (born November 13, 1957, in Greenwich, Connecticut) is a rower from the United States.

== Olympics ==
Geer and her sister qualified for the 1980 U.S. Olympic team; however, neither was able to compete due to the U.S. Olympic Committee's boycott of the 1980 Summer Olympics in Moscow, Russia. They both received a Congressional Gold Medal many years later as consolation. She competed for the United States in the 1984 Summer Olympics held in Los Angeles, California, in the single sculls event where she finished in second place.

== A family of Olympians ==
Carlie's sister Julia "Judy" Geer competed in the 1976 and 1984 Olympics for the American rowing teams, her brother-in-law Richard "Dick" Dreissigacker competed as a rower in the 1972 Summer Olympics, and her nieces Hannah and Emily competed in biathlon in the 2014 Winter Olympics and 2018 Winter Olympics, respectively.
