= Sanda Toma =

Sanda Toma may refer to:

- Sanda Toma (canoeist) (born 1970), Romanian Olympic sprint canoeist
- Sanda Toma (rower) (born 1956), Romanian Olympic rower
