= Frances Cryan =

Irish rower and Olympian

Frances Cryan (born 3 December 1958, Carrick on Shannon, County Leitrim, Ireland) is an Irish rower and Olympian.

== Rowing career ==
Cryan started rowing as the River Shannon flowed by the outside of her back garden. She and three friends from school started rowing together as a coxless four. They rowed together but they gradually moved away leaving Cryan to scull alone. In 1974, she joined Carrick on Shannon Rowing club, one of Ireland's oldest rowing clubs. She was eleven times Irish Women's Single Sculls Champion from the years 1976–1986 inclusive.

== Olympics ==
Cryan competed at the 1980 Summer Olympics in Moscow where she was placed seventh in the single sculls event, and was the first woman to compete in Rowing for Ireland at the Olympic Games. Cryan was fifteen-hundredths of a second away from reaching the final. Cryan attributed this to the 1980 Summer Olympics boycott allowing her to score higher as she felt a lot of the stronger competitors in rowing did not participate due to the boycott. After the 1980 Olympics, Cryan started working harder on her training with more weights practice. In 1983, she started to train in the United States in preparation for the 1984 Summer Olympics. However due to constant ninth-place finishes at the World Rowing Championships, the Irish Amateur Rowing Union voted against her being allowed to represent Ireland at the Olympics again as it was felt she had had her chance and due to her refusal to move to Dublin to train.

Despite this, Cryan's performance at the 1980 Olympics was voted by readers of the Leitrim Observer to have been County Leitrim's greatest sporting moment, beating out Leitrim GAA's 1994 Connacht Senior Football Championship victory and Breege Connolly.
