= Irina Fetisova =

Irina Fetisova may refer to:

- Irina Fetisova (swimmer and rower) (born 1956), Soviet female swimmer and rower
- Irina Fetisova (volleyball) (born 1994), Russian female volleyball player
