= Hannah Dreissigacker =

American biathlete (born 1986)

Personal information
- Born: December 2, 1986 (age 39) Morrisville, Vermont, U.S.

Sport
- Country: United States
- Sport: Biathlon

Hannah Dreissigacker (born December 2, 1986, in Morrisville, Vermont) is a former American biathlete. She competed at the 2014 Winter Olympics in Sochi.

== Career ==
Dreissigacker comes from a family of Olympic rowers. Her father Richard "Dick" Dreissigacker competed in 1972, her mother Julia "Judy" Geer in 1976 and 1984, and her aunt Charlotte "Carlie" Geer won a silver medal in single sculls in the 1984 Olympics. Her sister Emily Dreissigacker also competed in Biathlon at the 2018 Winter Olympics.

She competed in cross-country skiing for Dartmouth College, where she graduated in 2009 with a degree in engineering and studio art, following in the footsteps of her parents, who were both engineers.

Dreissigacker retired from biathlon in the spring of 2016, although she did subsequently compete in the 2017 edition of the Merino Muster marathon cross-country ski race in New Zealand, where she finished second among the women, behind winner Jessie Diggins.
