= Valeria Răcilă =

Romanian rower

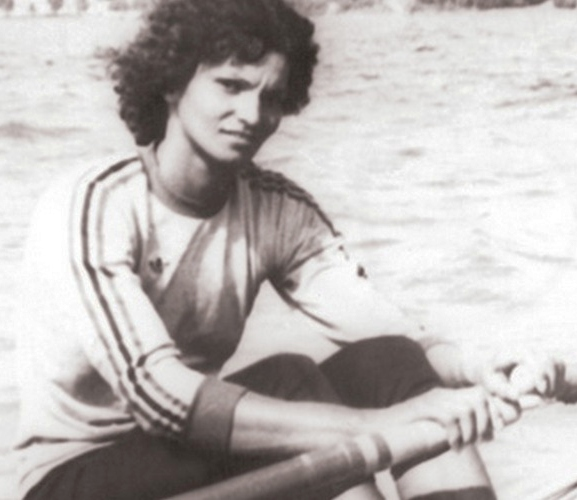

Personal information
- Born: 2 June 1957 (age 69) Stulpicani, Romania
- Height: 180 cm (5 ft 11 in)
- Weight: 74 kg (163 lb)

Sport
- Sport: Rowing
Medal record
Representing Romania
Olympic Games
Bronze medal – third place	1980 Moscow	Double sculls
Gold medal – first place	1984 Los Angeles	Single sculls
World Rowing Championships
Bronze medal – third place	1979 Bled	Double sculls
Bronze medal – third place	1981 Munich	Quadruple sculls
Silver medal – second place	1982 Lucerne	Single sculls
Silver medal – second place	1985 Hazewinkel	Single sculls

Valeria Răcilă (later Roşca, later van Groningen, born 2 June 1957) is a retired Romanian rower. She first competed in double and quadruple sculls, winning bronze medals at the 1980 Olympics and 1979 and 1981 world championships. She then changed to single sculls, and won an Olympic gold medal in 1984 and silver medals at the world championships in 1982 and 1985.
