= Pauzok =

Type of boat

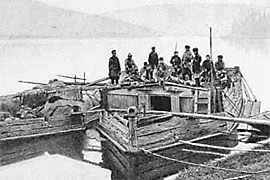
- The Pauzoks at Lena River in 1881

Class overview
- Name: Pauzok Russian: Паузок

General characteristics
- Type: Cargo ship
- Tonnage: 120 tonnes (130 short tons)
- Length: 24 m (79 ft)
- Notes: Flat-bottomed sail-rowing vessel intended for use in rivers

A pauzok (Russian: Паузок) is a flat-bottomed boat and is designed for travelling the rivers of Russia.

Aside from its flat bottom, another prominent feature of that is its lack of deck. The boat has a single mast, usually 24 metres (79 ft) in length, with a sail and is steered by oars.

There is a large space within the vessel, often used for storing cargo. Pauzoks have a standard load-carrying capacity of 120 tonnes (130 short tons), and tend to accompany large vessels as they are useful for cargo transportation in shoals. Pauzoks are mainly built in the northern regions of Russia, such as the Volga and Lena River.

Pauzoks are also used to deliver cargo to the coast or in carrying cargo in sections where the river bed has a relatively steep slope, and can independently navigate rapids. If a pauzok beaches itself on a shore, the crew often uses a long, thick, and wide board which in Siberia is referred to as Opleukha (Russian: оплеуха Translated: slap in the face). The oarsmen use this as a lever to move the vessel towards a current. A small dam is formed, and small rising of water raises the pauzok and it can be pushed off from a bank on a deep-water place.
