= Stephanie Foster (rower) =

New Zealand rower

Stephanie Foster MBE
Personal information
- Born: Stephanie Charlene Foster; 2 September 1958 (age 67) Morrinsville, New Zealand
- Height: 181 cm (5 ft 11 in)
- Weight: 71 kg (157 lb)

Sport
- Sport: Rowing
Medal record
Women's rowing
Representing New Zealand
World Rowing Championships
Bronze medal – third place	1982 Lucerne	W1x
Bronze medal – third place	1986 Nottingham	W2x
Commonwealth Games
Gold medal – first place	1986 Edinburgh	W1x
Gold medal – first place	1986 Edinburgh	W2x

Stephanie Charlene Cooper-Foster MBE (born 2 September 1958), best known under her maiden name Stephanie Foster, is a former New Zealand rower.

== Early life ==
Foster was born in 1958 in Morrinsville, a provincial town in the Waikato region of New Zealand. She was involved in many sports. After her family moved to Auckland, she attended Papakura High School.

== Rowing career ==
Foster had a cousin who was a rower. She listened with her parents to the radio of the 1972 New Zealand eight winning gold at the Munich Olympics. Soon after, she was asked to try rowing because a team was one rower short. She agreed and joined the Auckland Rowing Club.

Foster first competed internationally at the 1978 World Rowing Championships at Lake Karapiro, New Zealand. With the women's coxed four and the women's eight, she won both B-finals. At the 1981 World Rowing Championships at Oberschleißheim, Germany, she came fifth in the women's single scull. At the 1982 World Rowing Championships in Lucerne, Switzerland, she won a bronze medal in the single scull.

She represented New Zealand in the single scull event at the 1984 Olympics, coming seventh overall in the single scull. At the 1986 World Rowing Championships at Nottingham in the United Kingdom, she won a bronze in the women's double scull with Robin Clarke. She was the flagbearer at the 1986 Commonwealth Games at both the opening and the closing ceremonies, and won golds in the women's single scull and in the women's double scull with Robin Clarke.

In the 1987 Queen's Birthday Honours, Foster was appointed a Member of the Order of the British Empire, for services to rowing.

== Private life ==
She married the rower Brett Cooper while she was still competing internationally. She uses her married name apart from rowing, where she goes by her maiden name. They have two sons who also took up rowing. The family lived for three decades at Lake Rotoiti followed by a short stint in Gore, before settling in Wedderburn in the 2020s.
