= Robin Clarke =

New Zealand rower

Personal information
- Born: 1963 or 1964 (age 61–62) New Zealand
Medal record
Women's rowing
Representing New Zealand
World Rowing Championships
Bronze medal – third place	1986 Nottingham	W2x
Commonwealth Games
Gold medal – first place	1986 Edinburgh	W2x

Robin Clarke (born 1964) is a retired New Zealand rower.

Clarke started rowing at age 13, and four years later, she was selected for the national rowing team.

At the 1986 Commonwealth Games in Edinburgh, Scotland, she won a gold medal in the women's double sculls with Stephanie Foster. Some weeks later at the 1986 World Rowing Championships at Nottingham in the United Kingdom, she won a bronze in the women's double sculls with Foster.

Clarke retired from rowing in 1997 when she was pregnant with twin boys.
