= Lisa Scheibert =

Norwegian rower

Personal information
- Nationality: Norwegian
- Born: 22 September 1963 (age 62) Washington, D.C., United States

Sport
- Sport: Rowing

Lisa Scheibert (born 22 September 1963) is a Norwegian rower. She competed in the women's single sculls event at the 1984 Summer Olympics.
