= Heather Hattin =

Canadian rower (born 1961)

Personal information
- Born: 15 May 1961 (age 64); Windsor, Ontario, Canada

Sport
- Sport: Rowing

Heather Hattin (born 15 May 1961) is a Canadian former rower. She competed in the women's single sculls event at the 1988 Summer Olympics.
