= Beata Dziadura =

Polish rower

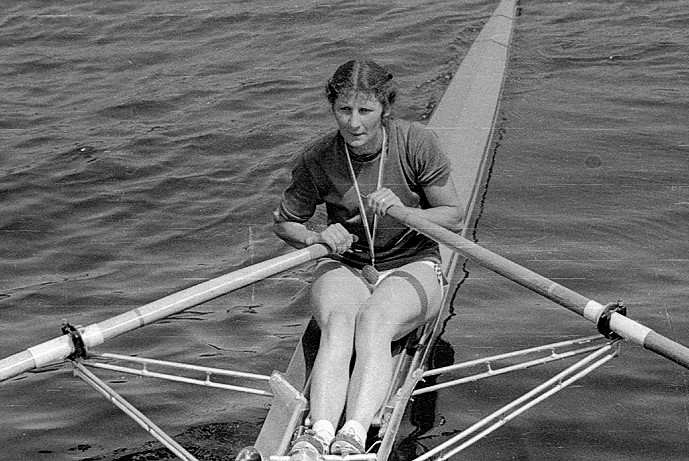
- Dziadura in 1982

Personal information
- Full name: Beata Grażyna Dziadura
- Born: 11 December 1952 (age 73) Gdańsk, Poland
- Height: 170 cm (5 ft 7 in)
- Weight: 64 kg (141 lb)

Sport
- Country: Poland
- Sport: Rowing

Beata Grażyna Dziadura (born 11 December 1952) is a Polish rower. She competed in the women's single sculls event at the 1980 Summer Olympics.
