= Croker Oars =

Manufacturer of rowing oars

- Trade name: Croker Oars
- Native name: Crokers
- Founded: Sydney, Australia
- Founder: Howard Croker
- Products: Rowing oars
- Website: crokeroars.com

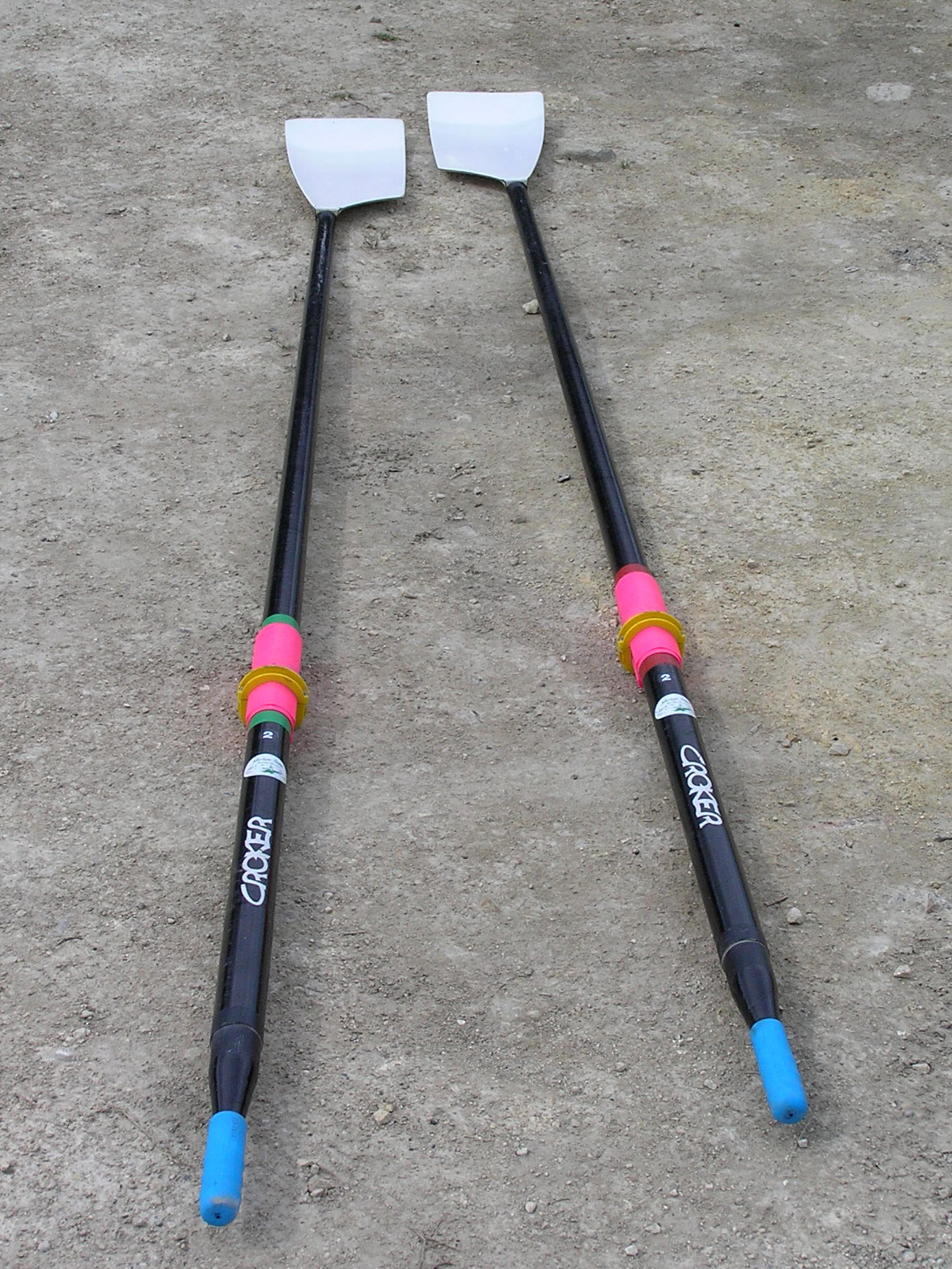
A pair of sculling oars. The "blades" are at the top of the picture and the handles are at the bottom.

Croker Oars is an Australian manufacturer of rowing oars that was started by Howard Croker OAM in Sydney, Australia. They are now manufactured on Oxley Island, Taree, on the banks of the lower Manning River, in New South Wales. During the 1950s, Croker and his two brothers were students at Newington College and their father was a rowing coach at the school. Howard Croker went on to be a successful rower in the 1960s, winning both State and National rowing titles. Croker rowed for the then Haberfield Rowing Club at Dobroyd Point and was a coach in the years 1975 and 1976 at The Scots College. Croker Oars currently produce sculling and sweep oars for the Australian and international market. Croker also manufactures surf boat oars. Many elite rowers use Croker oars and together with Concept2 oars they make up the majority of oars used in international competition.
