= Jacqui Marshall =

Australian rower (born 1957)

Personal information
- Nationality: Australian
- Born: 13 March 1957 (age 69)

Sport
- Sport: Rowing
- Club: MUBC

Achievements and titles
- National finals: ULVA Trophy 1981-84

Jacqui Marshall (born 13 March 1957) is an Australian former representative rower. She was a fourteen-time Australian national champion, represented at the 1981 World Championships and competed in the women's single sculls event at the 1984 Summer Olympics.

== Club and state rowing ==
Marshall's senior club rowing was from the Melbourne University Boat Club. She first represented for the university club at the 1978 Intervarsity Championships. In later life when she began masters rowing she rowed in Bundaberg Rowing Club colours.

At the 1981 Australian Rowing Championships in MUBC colours she won a national title in the women's elite coxed four and placed second with Westendorf in the elite pair. At the 1982 Championships she won Australian titles in all three senior women's sweep oared boat classes. She repeated this feat in 1983 when she stroked all three of those winning boats. Om 1984 she won titles in the women's four and the eight.

Marshall first made state selection for Victoria in 1981 when she was selected to stroke the women's senior coxed four which raced and won the ULVA Trophy at the Interstate Regatta within the annual Australian Rowing Championships. They won the gold. Marshall made further appearances in the Victorian senior women's four in 1982, 1983, 1984 for three further national title victories.

== International representative rowing ==
Marshall made her Australian representative debut when she was selected with Pam Westendorf to race Australia's coxless pair at the 1981 World Rowing Championships in Munich. They finished in overall eight place.

For the 1984 Los Angeles Olympics Australia had qualified a women's coxless four which ultimately won bronze. Marshall was selected as a reserve for that crew but was given the opportunity to race the single scull in Los Angeles. She placed fourth in her heart and was eliminated in the repechage.

== Masters rowing and later life ==
In 2009, now a schoolteacher in Bundaberg Queensland, Marshall again teamed with Westendorf to prepare and race a women's coxless pair (D Division) at the 2009 World Masters Games in Sydney. They won their event and a World Masters gold medal.
