= Andrea Schreiner =

Canadian rower

Personal information
- Nationality: Canadian
- Born: 27 April 1959 (age 66)

Sport
- Sport: Rowing

Andrea Schreiner (born 27 April 1959) is a Canadian rower. She competed in the women's single sculls event at the 1984 Summer Olympics.
