= Astrid Unger =

Austrian rower

Personal information
- Nationality: Austrian
- Born: 27 July 1963 (age 61)

Sport
- Sport: Rowing

Astrid Unger (born 27 July 1963) is an Austrian rower. She competed in the women's single sculls event at the 1984 Summer Olympics.
