= Laurence Hourdel =

French rower

Personal information
- Nationality: French
- Born: 18 August 1965 (age 59)

Sport
- Sport: Rowing

Laurence Hourdel (born 18 August 1965) is a French rower. She competed in the women's single sculls event at the 1984 Summer Olympics.
