= Nataliya Kvasha =

Ukrainian rower

Personal information
- Nationality: Ukrainian
- Born: 12 September 1963 (age 61); Pisky, Ukraine

Sport
- Sport: Rowing

Nataliya Kvasha (born 12 September 1963) is a Ukrainian rower. She competed in the women's single sculls event at the 1988 Summer Olympics.
