= F Collar =

British marine company

Collars
- Type: Private limited company by shares
- Industry: Marine
- Founded: 1932
- Headquarters: Oxford
- Products: Oars, Masts and Spars
- Website: http://www.collars.co.uk

Collars Oars is a UK, Oxford based business specialising in producing hand crafted wooden yacht masts, wooden oars and spars. The company is currently owned by Freeland Yachtspars Limited and has exchanged hands several times since it was founded by Frank Collar in 1932.

== Early days ==
The business of F.Collar Ltd was started in 1932 by Mr Frank Collar who was at the time trained in accountancy but had always been a keen rower. Based in the old Oxford University Boathouse situated at the bottom of Isis Street, he began by repairing damaged oars for college crews. With demand high a few weeks later he was joined by his father along with a 14-year-old by the name of Bill Scaldwell who was taken on as an apprentice. With the growing popularity of rowing it was not long after that an order was received for the manufacture of six pairs of sculls, starting the business of oar making. A small quantity of wood was purchased and with limited tools and no machines, they were made by hand, and in the absence of electricity they were varnished by candlelight.

The business progressed and orders grew for new sets of rowing blades for not only the Oxford University crews but also other schools and colleges throughout the country including the Cambridge University teams. By the time the Second World War broke out the Collar reputation was sufficiently established for Frank to secure a contract with the Air Ministry to make oars for all aircraft lifeboats.

== Ministry of Defence contract ==
Winning a contract with the Ministry of Defence (United Kingdom) (MOD) is marked as a turning point in the company history due to the vast quantity of oars ordered and as a result additional staff, machines and premises had to be found. While the oars for the Air Ministry were in production the Royal Navy approached Collars to design a paddle to be used in invasion. It had to be able to enter the water as quietly as possible yet strong enough to do the job. A design for the 5’ Paddle was submitted, accepted and thousands were ordered. The contract required a nearly 24-hour production schedule to meet the deadline. Today there is still an enabling contract in place with the MOD and the same paddle, along with certain oars are still being produced by Collars in Oxford.

== Yacht masts ==
In 1950 Frank Collar and Bill Scaldwell joined in partnership and this was shortly followed by the boom in sailing which took F. Collar into the manufacturing of yacht and dinghy masts in a big way. With the chosen timber of Sitka Spruce being used in both oars and masts, and a very similar manufacturing process, this was a natural progression. By the time of the 1968 Mexico Olympics Collars were commissioned to supply all the masts for the popular Finn Class dinghy, and with wood being a varying natural material, 100 masts were made and the 50 most similar masts were chosen and taken to competition.

== Accolades ==
The Collar racing oars have been exported to every Western Country as well as regularly exported to Australia, New Zealand and America. Used in every Olympic games from 1952 to 1984 as well as international competitions. In 1970 two pairs of sculls were supplied to Sidney Genders and were used to successfully row the Atlantic, later followed by Chay Blyth and John Ridgway (sailor).

== Present day ==
Collars led the field of oar making until early 1980 when modern advances resulted in the introduction of a carbon fibre oar. Pioneered by the Dreissigacker brothers the new material provided a lighter and stronger oar, and by 1985 regular orders had dried up. Still providing recreational, specialist sculls and oars Collars were to move their primary focus to the yachting market that had been steadily growing in the background.

With a change of hands and ownership the Collar brand is currently owned by Freeland Yacht Spar Limited based in Dorchester on Thames near Oxford, where a staff of 13 still produce wooden oars, masts and spars for yachts from all round the world.

== Products ==
At present the company hand manufactures Masts and Spars for Yachts as well as a broad selection of standard and specialist wooden oars. Recently, the company has begun specialising in hand crafted Flag Poles.
