= List of rowing blades =

Oar blades
USA National Team blade

Harvard Kennedy School

University of California

St Andrew Boat Club

This is a list of blades of national teams, rowing clubs, schools and universities. The designs are not trademarked while the sport remains near globally not-for-profit although in some jurisdictions a club may assert design rights and similar to prevent imitation. It is also possible where identical or near identical blades are watched in winter head races or in summer side-by-side (multi-lane regatta) races for there to be instances of mistaken identity among supporters all of which considerations are commonly borne in mind instead of choosing unpainted blades among established clubs.

== National teams ==
National teams often draw their colours from the related national flags.

== Clubs ==
Club colours may be entirely original or very often based on local governmental or manorial coats of arms.

== School and university ==
As with other academic sports teams the blades used tend to draw as their inspiration heraldry of their academic institutions. On rare occasions a colour difference between male and female blades is found in academic settings, as in the case of Worcester College, Oxford.

== See also ==
- Oar (sport rowing)
- Gallery of sovereign state flags
- List of coats of arms
- List of universities
