= Emily Dreissigacker =

American biathlete (born 1988)

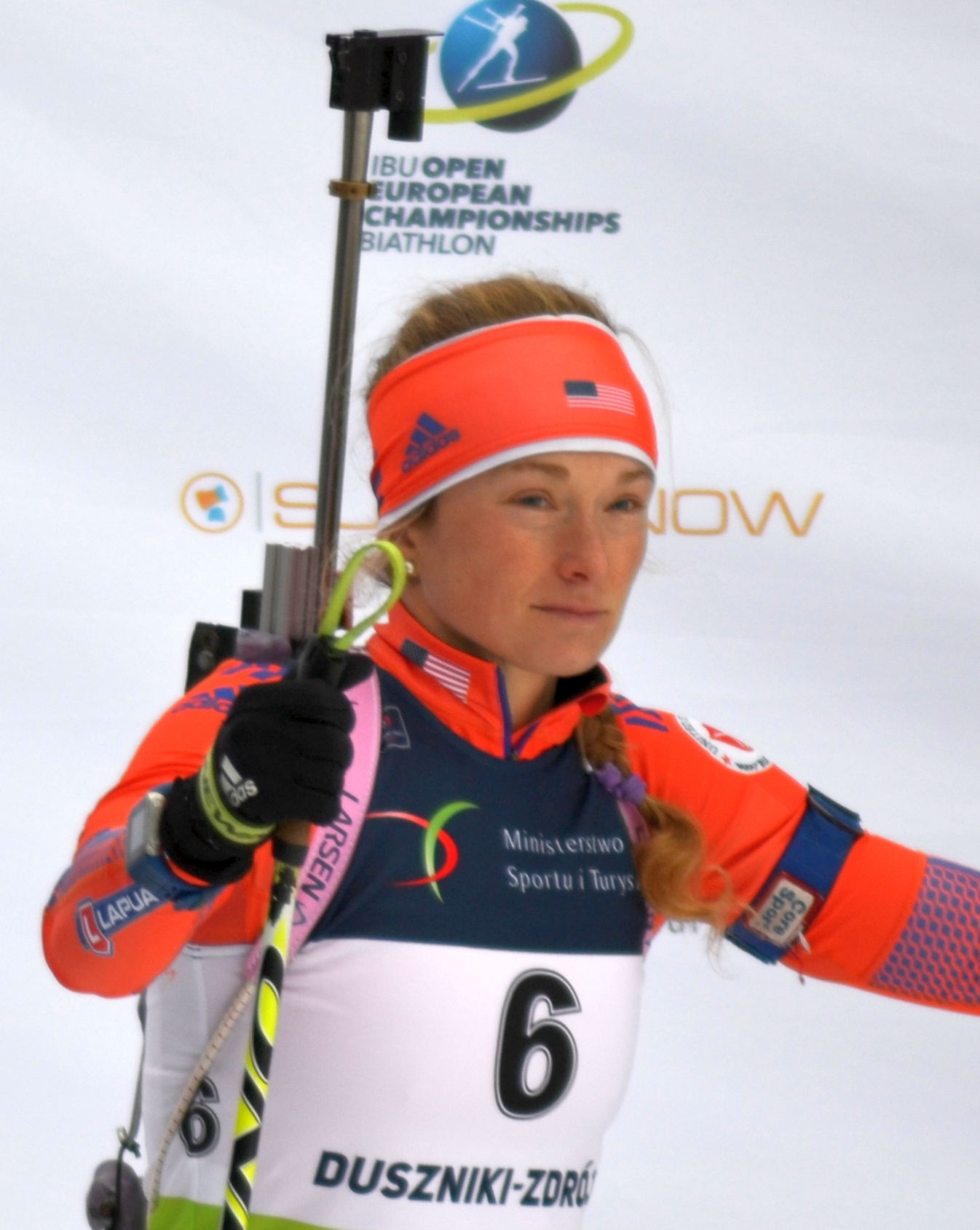
- Emily Dreissigacker in 2017

Personal information
- Born: November 29, 1988 (age 36); Vermont, United States

Sport
- Country: United States
- Sport: Biathlon

Emily Dreissigacker (born November 29, 1988) is a former biathlete from Vermont.

== Life and career ==
She competed for the United States at the 2018 Winter Olympics. As a teenager, Dreissigacker competed in cross-country skiing before taking up competitive rowing, going on to become a two-time NCAA All-American whilst a student at Dartmouth College, where she graduated with a degree in economics in 2011. Her switch to biathlon came about in 2014, when she injured her finger in an accident, leaving her unable to row for three months. As a result, she took up cross-country skiing again as cross-training. She retired from biathlon after the 2019/20 season.

Her father, Dick Dreissigacker, is an Olympic rower; her mother, Judy Geer, is a three time Olympian in rowing; and her maternal aunt, Charlotte Geer, is a two time Olympian and 1984 Olympic silver medalist in single sculling. She is the sister of fellow Olympic biathlete Hannah Dreissigacker.

== Biathlon results ==
=== Olympic Games ===
Event	Individual	Sprint	Pursuit	Mass Start	Relay	Mixed Relay
(South Korea) 2018 Pyeongchang	67th	51st	47th	-	13th	-

=== World Championships ===
Event	Individual	Sprint	Pursuit	Mass start	Relay	Mixed relay	Single mixed relay
(Sweden) 2019 Östersund	-	-	-	-	9th	-	-
(Italy) 2020 Rasen-Antholz	69th	73rd	-	-	15th	-	-
