= Concept2 =

US manufacturer of rowing equipment and exercise machines

- Founded: 1976; 50 years ago
- Founder: Dick Dreissigacker, Pete Dreissigacker
- Headquarters: Morrisville, Vermont
- Website: concept2.com

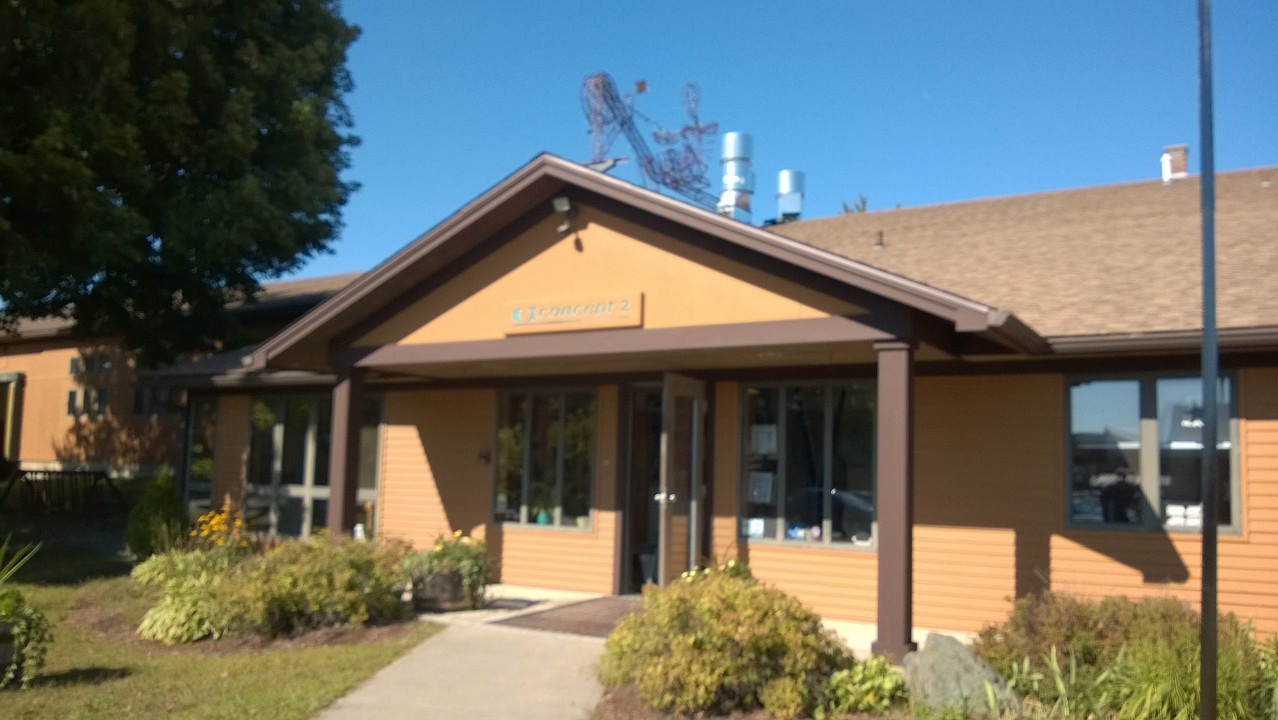
The headquarters of Concept2 in Morrisville, Vermont

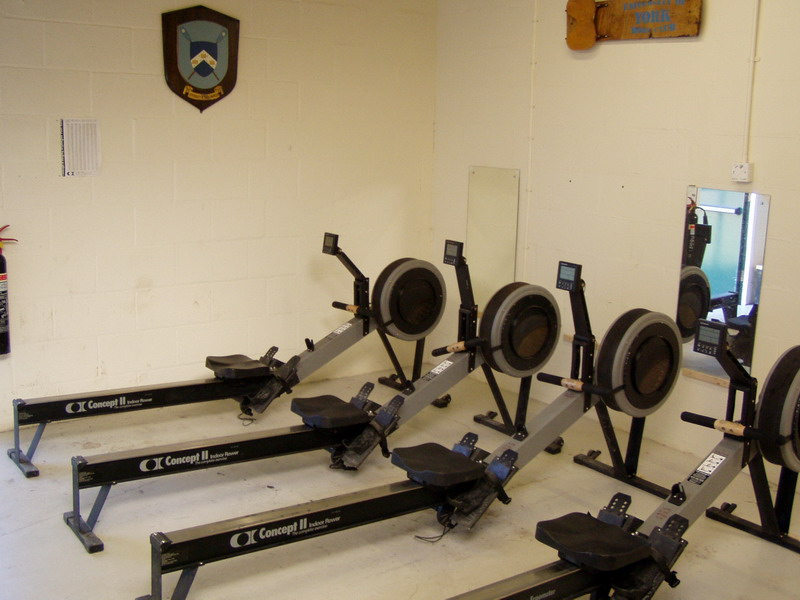
A line of Concept2 "Model C" indoor rowing machines

Concept2, Inc. is an American manufacturer of rowing equipment and exercise machines based in Morrisville, Vermont. It is best known for its air resistance indoor rowing machines. Considered the standard training and testing machines for competition rowers, they are often found in gyms, boathouses, elite training centers, and cardiac rehab and physical therapy facilities.

Competitive events using Concept2 Ergs include the World Rowing Indoor Championships, HYROX competitions, the British Rowing Indoor Championships competitions, and historic CrossFit Games events (including the CrossFit Open and qualifiers). Concept2 also manufactures oars for sculling and sweep rowing, as well as three other flywheel-based exercise machines: the SkiErg, the BikeErg for cycling, and the StrengthErg for strength training.

In 2025, 100% of Concept2 ownership was transferred to the Concept2 Perpetual Purpose Trust, which will endure in perpetuity. This model ensures the company will carry out its mission statement in the hands of its employees.

== History ==
Concept2 was founded in 1976 by rowing brothers Dick and Pete Dreissigacker. The two brothers trialed for the American team for the 1976 Summer Olympics. While preparing, they modified their oars with carbon fiber in an attempt to go faster. When they were not selected for the team, they founded the company and started selling carbon fiber oars. Their first office was in the back of a bread truck until they bought a farm in Morrisville, Vermont, United States.

== Equipment ==
=== Oars ===
When the Dreissigacker brothers first began selling oars, they were well-received by the rowing community. Concept2 soon established itself as a leading manufacturer in the market. In 1991, Concept2 introduced a new type of oar featuring asymmetrical blades known as "hatchet" blades. These blades soon gained popularity, and by 1992, most Olympic crews had adopted them. Today, many professional rowers use Concept2 oars, and together with Croker oars they make up the majority of equipment used in international rowing competitions.

As of May 2024, Concept2 manufactures oars with a variety of blade designs, including their Comp, Fat2, Smoothie2 Vortex Edge, Smoothie2 Plain Edge, Big Blade, Macon Blade, and Bantam Blade options. The company also provides various options for oar handles and shafts (including Ultralight, Skinny, and Skinny Coastal (Scull Only) options).

=== Ergometers ===
Ergometers are called such because of how they measure power output (Greek: measuring work). Competitive athletes rarely refer to the machines as "indoor rowers," but use the names "erg" or "ergo" as abbreviations for ergometer. Concept2 sells a variety of ergometer machines, including various models of the RowErg, as well as the SkiErg, BikeErg, and StrengthErg.

==== RowErg ====
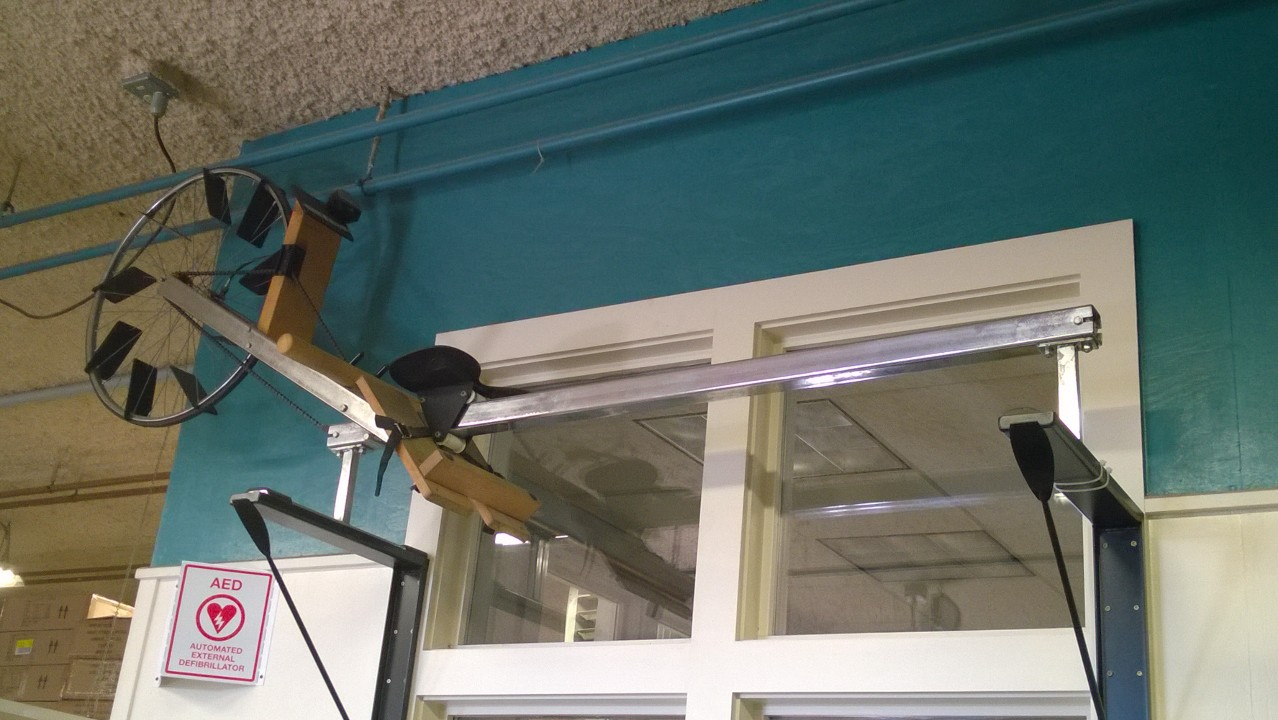
Old Model A version

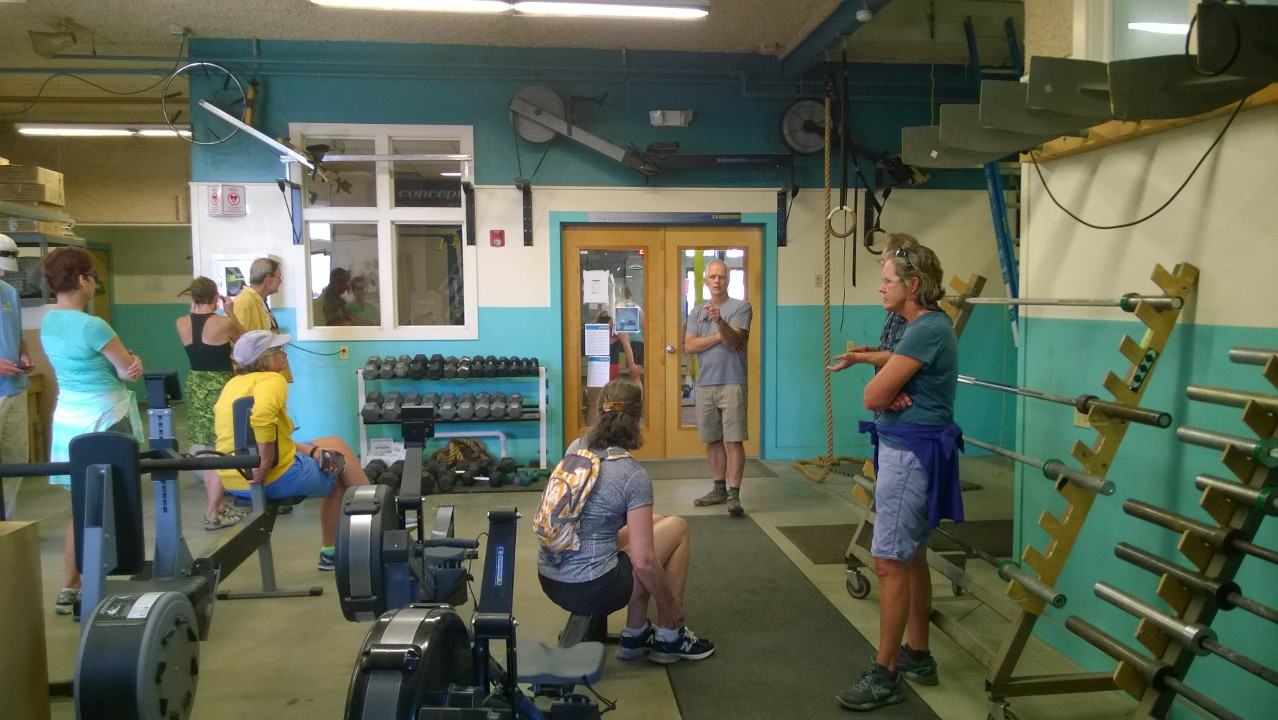
Concept2 equipment at the headquarters gym area.

In 1981, the Dreissigacker brothers had the idea of making an indoor rowing machine (the Model A) made mainly from bicycle parts. It had a moving seat and a flywheel which used air for resistance. At the time, the indoor rowing machines on the market cost $3,000, but the brothers (with help from friend Jon Williams) sold theirs for $600. The product was an instant success, with numerous iterations having been released over the years including the Model B (1986), Model C (1993), Model D (2003), Model E (2006) and Dynamic (2010).

The Dynamic RowErg, first released in 2010, is unique among its peers due to its having a moving foot stretcher rather than a moving seat. This sets it apart from other RowErg models and results in less body mass movement, simulating on-water rowing more accurately.

Until 2006, the company produced and sold only one model of RowErg at a time. That changed in August of 2006 when Concept2 began selling the Model E alongside their Model D. The Model E had higher and sturdier legs than the Model D, as well as a higher price. In early 2021, the Model D and Model E was discontinued and replaced by the RowErg and RowErg with Tall Legs respectively. The RowErg and RowErg with Tall Legs are the same except for the height of the front and rear legs, which is 14" on the standard RowErg and 20" on the RowErg with Tall Legs. The renaming of the Model D is partly to achieve consistency across the range, with the SkiErg and BikeErg.

Various modern models of the RowErg are used for indoor rowing events such as BIRC and CRASH-B. In 2018, CrossFit officially named Concept2's D & E models the official spec rowers for The CrossFit Open and Games. This followed an investigation which discovered that rival manufacturer Xebex's machines were "significantly easier than the competition standard," resulting in an official declaration that the Concept2 was the specification manufacturer.

Friction-prone areas of Concept2 Ergs (like the chain) are coated with nickel for longevity of the parts. Nickel coating also assists in lubrication and maintenance.

==== SkiErg ====
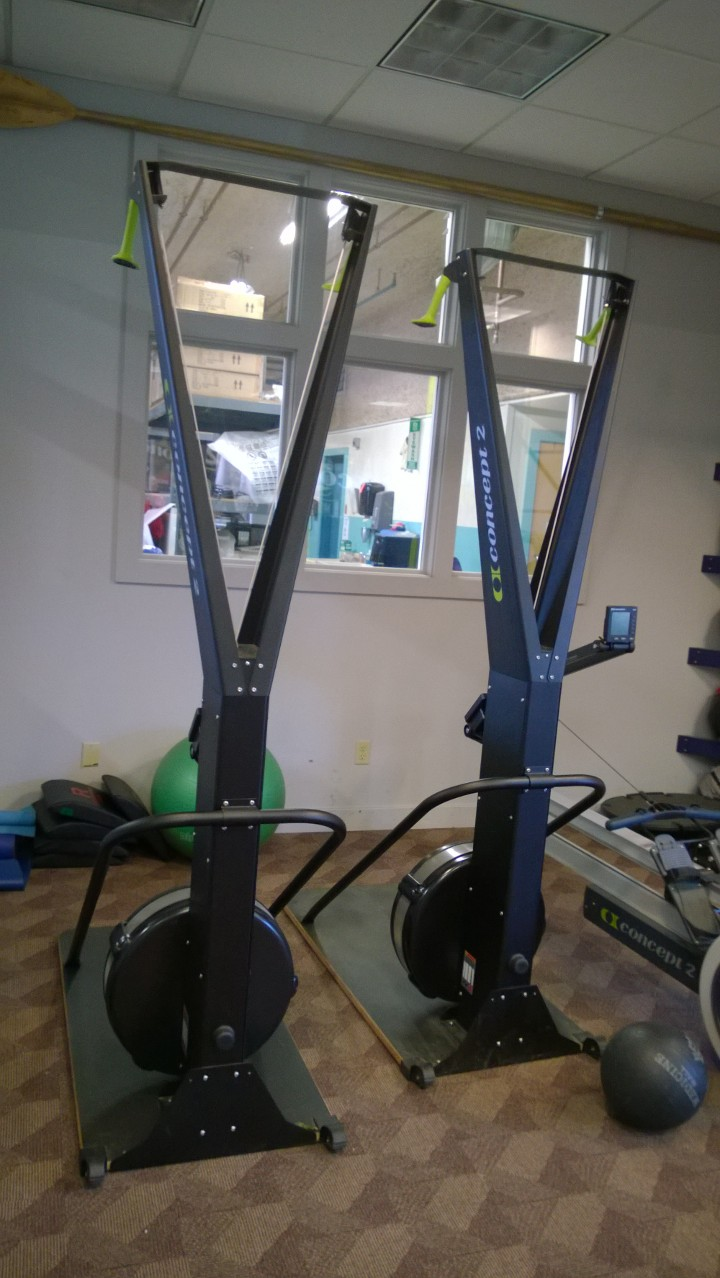
Two SkiErg machines

In 2009, Concept2 introduced the SkiErg. The SkiErg is a ski ergometer that helps build strength and endurance specific to Nordic skiing. The SkiErg uses the same mechanical concept that the company's RowErgs do, but the user is in a standing position pulling on two handles simulating the double-pole technique found in Nordic skiing. Each pull engages the arms, shoulders, core, and legs in a downwards "crunch" making it a total body workout. It places greater physical demands on the triceps, chest, and abdominal muscles, in addition to the strong engagement of the back muscles that both exercises share.

==== BikeErg ====
The Concept2 BikeErg is a stationary bike that was introduced in 2017. Combining the best features of a stationary bike and the Concept2 RowErg, it offers benefits for individuals of all fitness levels. The BikeErg's resistance increases with harder pedaling, providing a smooth, responsive ride that mimics the feel of cycling outdoors. This dynamic resistance system allows for greater control over workout intensity, making it ideal for both beginners and elite athletes. Unlike traditional spin bikes that rely on a belt or chain system, the BikeErg uses a clutch and air resistance, requiring minimal maintenance. The solid, sturdy frame ensures durability, making it a long-term investment for both home and gym use.

==== StrengthErg ====
The StrengthErg was invented by Concept2 and released for sale to the public in 2025. It is a compact, multifunctional strength training machine. This Erg uses the power of air resistance from Concept2 flywheel technology to deliver a comprehensive and safe workout without the need to deal with weight plates, racks and barbells. When using the machine, one applies as much or as little force as desired, and the StrengthErg will accurately measure and display power output. Concept2's free ErgData app gives users the performance tracking and analysis needed to achieve their goals.

=== Performance Monitors ===
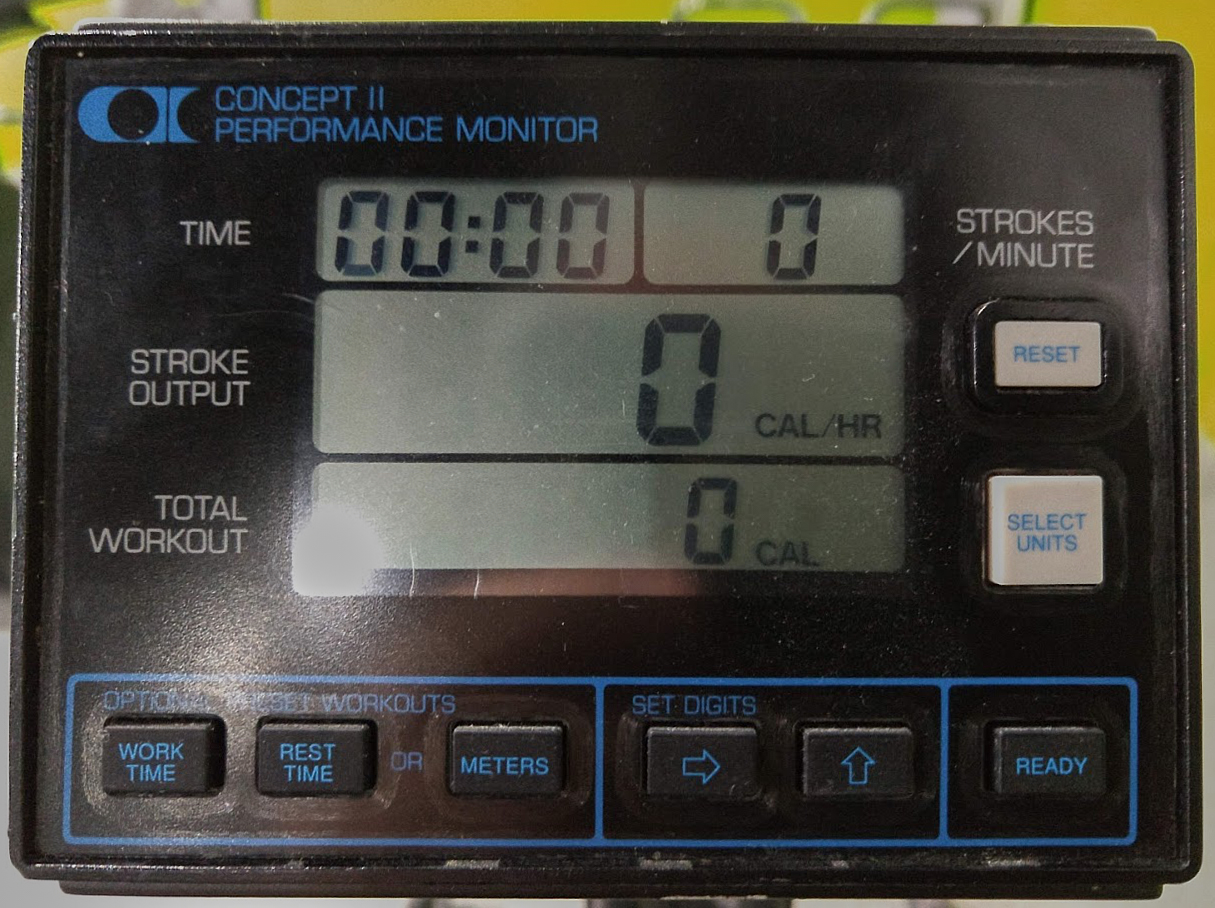
Early model performance monitor, model PM1. The PM1 was available from 1986-1995.

Over the years, Concept2 ergs have come with different display models called "Performance Monitors." These monitors provide the user with data on stroke rate, split, duration, calories, meters, and more. The most current Performance Monitor is the Performance Monitor 5, or "PM5." This monitor was first introduced in August 2014 and ships with all new RowErg, SkiErg, BikeErg, and StrengthErg models.

=== DYNO ===
The Concept2 DYNO was an air resistance strength training machine sold by Concept2 from 2001 until 2007. It was designed for bench press, leg press, and seated row exercises and used a flywheel to provide resistance.

== Online logbook and world rankings ==
Starting in 1999, the company began facilitating a community of home-based rowing and fitness enthusiasts who maintain online logs hosted on the Concept2 website. Their performances are ranked in real time on the Concept2 website. The total number of meters logged in the 2014 season (May 1, 2013 – April 30, 2014) exceeded 10.2 billion, by over 47,000 users. There are hundreds of clubs that rowers may affiliate with when registering with the ranking system. Meters can be logged on the RowErg, on water, on the SkiErg, on snow, on the BikeErg, and work can be logged on the StrengthErg. Concept2 also hosts year-round online challenges to motivate its fitness community.

== Online challenges ==
Concept2 organizes online challenges throughout the year. Many of these reward consistency and total meters instead of speed, giving an extra incentive to work out regularly.

=== Virtual Team Challenge ===
The Virtual Team Challenge (VTC), runs every year from January 1–31. Each team completes as many meters as they can collectively between 12:00 a.m. January 1 and 11:59 p.m. January 31. Virtual teams (not based on or around a specific physical location) can be made up of anyone from anywhere who wants to participate—friends, family, co-workers, old schoolmates, rowing teammates, and so on. Teams can also be real "clubs" with a physical location. Participants are only allowed to record meters from the RowErg, SkiErg, or BikeErg.

== See also ==
- Media related to Concept2 at Wikimedia Commons
- Similar manufacturers of exercise equipment:
  - BowFlex, Inc.
  - Johnson Health Tech
  - NordicTrack
  - Peloton Interactive
- Compatible Rowing Software:
  - MyWhoosh
  - Kinomap
