= Tonia Svaier =

Greek rower (born 1968)

Personal information
- Nationality: Greek
- Born: 26 April 1968 (age 56); Ioannina, Greece

Sport
- Sport: Rowing

Tonia Svaier (Greek: Τόνια Σβάιερ) (born 26 April 1968) is a Greek rower. She competed at the 1988 Summer Olympics, 1992 Summer Olympics and the 1996 Summer Olympics.

She was named the Greek Female Athlete of the Year for 1988.
