= Tim Brauch =

American professional skateboarder (1974–1999)

Timothy "Tim" Michael Brauch
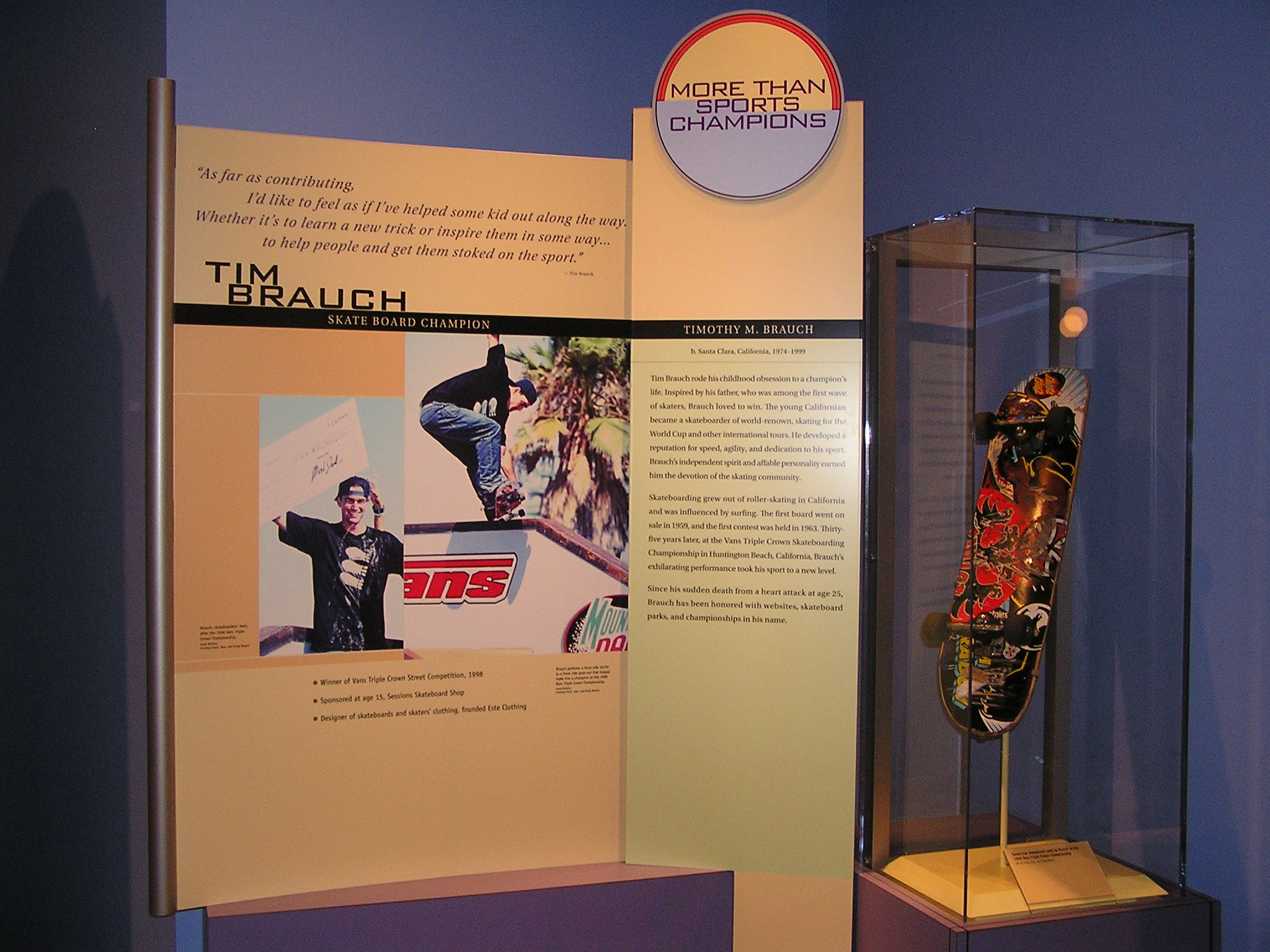
- Smithsonian Exhibit October 2004
- Born: April 26, 1974; San Jose, CA
- Died: May 9, 1999 (aged 25); San Jose, CA
- Other name: Beans
- Occupations: Skateboarder, Artist, and Writer
- Known for: Skateboarding
- Website: http://www.timbrauch.com

Timothy "Tim" Michael Brauch (April 26, 1974 – May 9, 1999) was an American professional skateboarder who grew up in San Jose, California. Brauch came up in skateboarding during the late 1980s and early 1990s, a period of skateboarding when professionalism meant small paychecks and little fame outside skateboarding, but much travel and many experiences and good times with friends and like-minded skaters.

== Professional career ==
At age 15 Tim got sponsored by Sessions, followed by sponsorship by Vans, Independent, and New Deal, which led to his first video part, in the New Deal video Useless Wooden Toys. Not long thereafter, Tim made the switch to Santa Monica Airlines out of the local NHS stable, and his first pro model was on SMA, in 1992. Tim's association with Joel Gomez and Sessions continued, eventually leading to the establishment of the brand Este, a portmanteau for "S" and "T," representing Tim and his good friend and fellow San Jose professional Salman Agah. Tim helped design the Este line. In the mid-1990s, Tim made the switch from Vans to etnies Footwear, although he remained close to Vans honcho Steve Van Doren throughout his life. When SMA quit his co-work with NHS, Tim made the easy switch to Santa Cruz Skateboards, which was the company he rode for until he died.

=== Contests ===
Although he had entered numerous contests throughout his amateur and professional career, Tim gained significant fame winning the Huntington Beach Vans Triple Crown Street Competition in 1998, which at the time was among the biggest contests in skateboarding. That year, Brauch was a World Cup skateboarder who was ranked No. 5 internationally.

== Death ==
Tim Brauch died of sudden cardiac arrest on Sunday, May 9, 1999, Mother's Day, at the age of 25.

== Memorials ==
Each year in the fall friends gather at the Tim Brauch Memorial Skatepark in Scotts Valley, CA for the annual Tim Brauch Memorial Contest.

== Smithsonian Exhibition ==
Tim was featured in the traveling Smithsonian Exhibit Sports: Breaking Records, Breaking Barriers which toured from October 2004 to December 2007 across the United States. The exhibit featured such athletes as Hank Aaron, Michael Jordan, Jackie Robinson, Muhammad Ali, and Lance Armstrong.
