= Jos Compaan =

Dutch rower (1958–2020)

Personal information
- Nationality: Dutch
- Born: 2 July 1958; Purmerend, Netherlands
- Died: 30 December 2020 (aged 62)

Sport
- Sport: Rowing

Jos Compaan (2 July 1958 – 30 December 2020) was a Dutch rower. She competed at the 1980 Summer Olympics, 1984 Summer Olympics and the 1988 Summer Olympics.
