= Sanda Toma (rower) =

Romanian rower

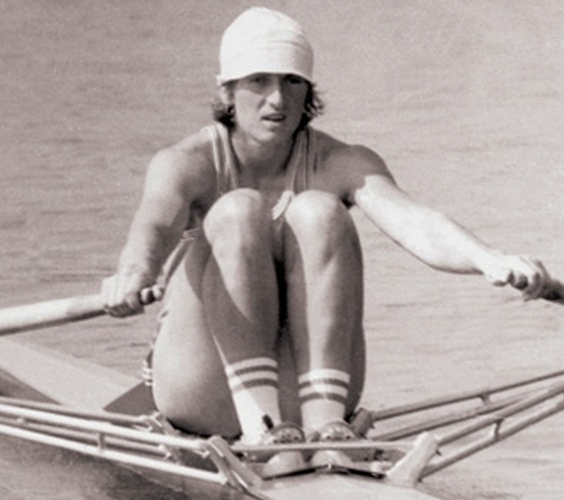
- Toma at the 1980 Olympics

Personal information
- Born: 24 February 1956 (age 70) Ştefăneşti, Romania
- Height: 176 cm (5 ft 9 in)
- Weight: 75 kg (165 lb)

Sport
- Sport: Rowing
- Club: Steaua Bucharest
Medal record
Representing Romania
Olympic Games
Gold medal – first place	1980 Moscow	Single sculls
World Rowing Championships
Gold medal – first place	1979 Bled	Single sculls
Gold medal – first place	1981 Munich	Single sculls

Sanda Toma (later Urichianu, born 24 February 1956) is a retired Romanian rower. Competing in single sculls she won the world title in 1979 and 1981 and an Olympic gold medal in 1980.

Toma first trained in handball and athletics, winning four junior national titles in throwing events, before changing to rowing. In 1976 she was included to the national team, where she first competed in doubles, together with Olga Homeghi. In 1979 she changed to single sculls. Between 1979 and 1981 she remained unbeaten in this event and was named Romanian Sportsperson of the Year three times in a row.

Toma graduated in physical education from the West University of Timișoara. After retiring from competitions she devoted herself to family and teaching, lecturing at the Bucharest Military Academy and University of Ecology in Bucharest.
