= Inger Pors Olsen =

Danish rower (born 1966)

Personal information
- Nationality: Danish
- Born: 7 January 1966 (age 59); Odense, Denmark

Sport
- Sport: Rowing

Inger Pors Olsen (born 7 January 1966) is a Danish rower. She competed at the 1988 Summer Olympics and the 1996 Summer Olympics.
