= Ursula Brauch =

German rower

Personal information
- Nationality: German
- Born: 18 October 1962 (age 62); Karlsruhe, Germany

Sport
- Sport: Rowing

Ursula Brauch (born 18 October 1962) is a German rower. She competed in the women's single sculls event at the 1984 Summer Olympics.
