= Indoor rower =

Exercise machine simulating watercraft rowing

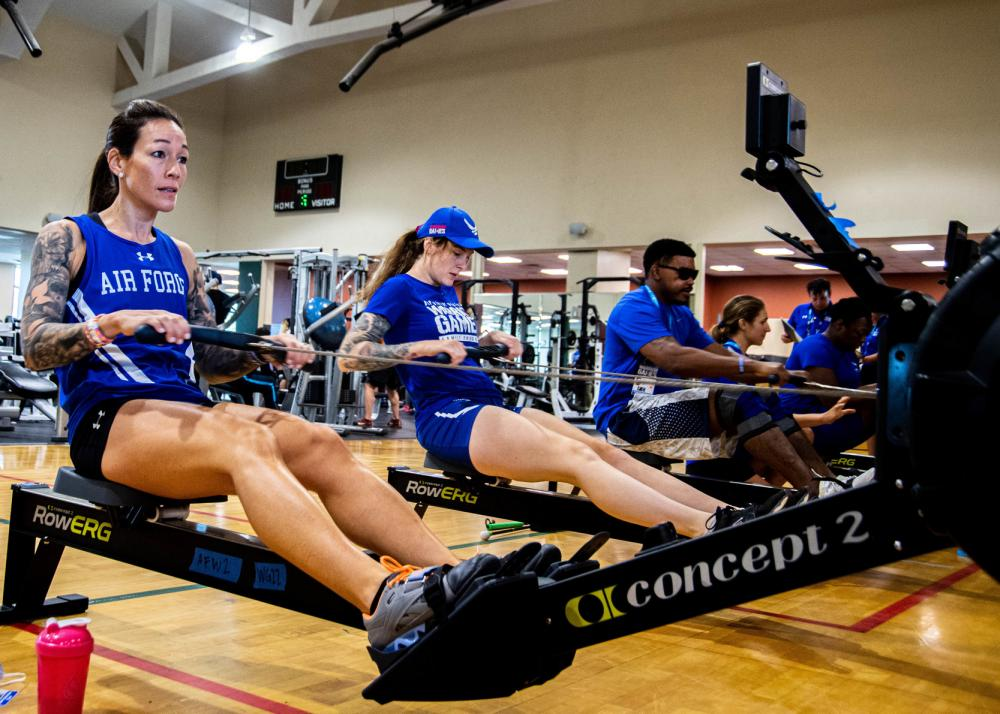
Several Concept2 indoor rowers

An indoor rower, or rowing machine, is a machine used to simulate the action of watercraft rowing for the purpose of exercise or training for rowing. Modern indoor rowers are known as ergometers (colloquially erg or ergo) because they measure work performed by the rower (that can be measured in ergs). Indoor rowing has become established as a sport, drawing a competitive environment from around the world. The term "indoor rower" also refers to a participant in this sport.

== History ==
Chabrias, an Athenian admiral of the 4th century BC, introduced the first rowing machines as supplemental military training devices. "To train inexperienced oarsmen, Chabrias built wooden rowing frames onshore where beginners could learn technique and timing before they went onboard ship."

Early rowing machines are known to have existed from the mid-1800s, a US patent being issued to W.B. Curtis in 1872 for a particular hydraulic-based damper design. Machines using linear pneumatic resistance were common around 1900. One of the most popular was the Narragansett hydraulic rower, manufactured in Rhode Island from around 1900–1960.

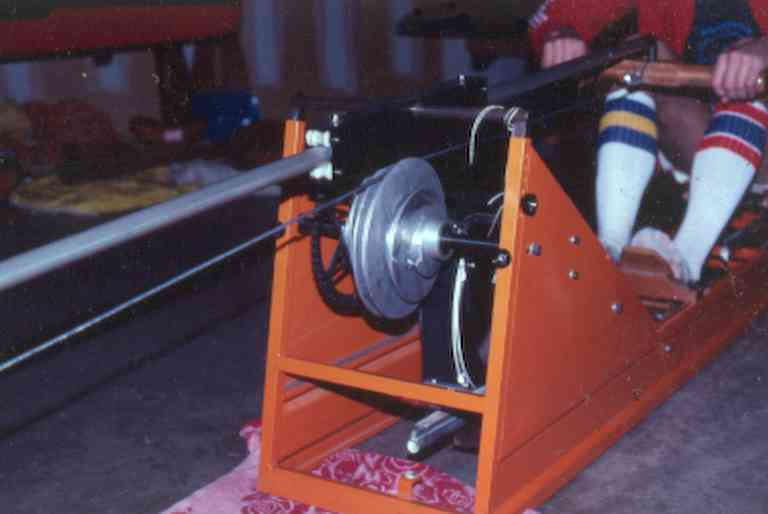
Gjessing-Nilson rowing ergometer, showing helical pulley and flywheel

In the 1970s, the Gjessing-Nilson ergometer from Norway used a friction brake mechanism with industrial strapping applied over the broad rim of the flywheel. Weights hanging from the strap ensured that an adjustable and predictable friction could be calculated.

The first air resistance ergometers were introduced around 1980 by Repco. In 1981, Peter and Richard Dreissigacker, and Jonathan Williams, filed for U.S. patent protection, as joint inventors of a "Stationary Rowing Unit". The first commercial embodiment of the Concept2 "rowing ergometer" was the Model A, a fixed-frame sliding-seat design using a bicycle wheel with fins attached for air resistance. In 1986, The Model B introduced a solid cast flywheel and the first digital performance monitor, which proved revolutionary. This machine's capability of accurate calibration combined with easy transportability spawned the sport of competitive indoor rowing, and revolutionised training and selection procedures for watercraft rowing. Later models were the C (1993) and D (2003).

In 1995, Casper Rekers, a Dutch engineer, was granted a U.S. patent for a (US 5382210A) "Dynamically Balanced Rowing Simulator". This device differed from the prior art in that the flywheel and footrests are fixed to a carriage, the carriage being free to slide fore and aft on a rail or rails integral to the frame. The seat is also free to slide fore and aft on a rail or rails integral to the frame.

== Equipment ==
=== Motion type ===
Modern indoor rowers have their resistance provided by a flywheel. Indoor rowers that use flywheel resistance are classified into two motion types. In both models, the user's rowing movement causes the footrests and seat to move further and closer apart in accordance with the user's stroke. The difference between the two types is that the footrests move or do not move relative to the ground.

The first type is distinguished by the Dreissigacker/Williams mechanism. This design has the flywheel and footrests fastened to a stationary frame, and the seat can slide fore and aft on a rail or rails built into the stationary frame. Therefore, during use, the seat moves relative to the footrests and also relative to ground, while the flywheel and footrests remain stationary relative to ground.

The second type is characterised by the Rekers device. With this type, both the seat and the footrests are free to slide fore and aft on a rail or rails integral to a stationary frame. Therefore, during use, the seat and the footrests move relative to each other, and both also move relative to ground.

=== Damper type ===
Piston resistance comes from hydraulic cylinders that are attached to the handles of the rowing machine.

Braked flywheel resistance models comprise magnetic, air, and water resistance rowers.

Magnetic resistance models control resistance by means of permanent magnets or electromagnets.

Air resistance models use vanes on the flywheel to provide the flywheel braking needed to generate resistance.

Water resistance models consist of a paddle revolving in an enclosed tank of water.

Dual Resistance Rower is a professional fitness equipment with fan and magnetic brake resistance for a variety of intensity levels from warm-ups to HIIT intervals.

=== Slides ===
Sometimes, slides are placed underneath the machine, which allows it to move back and forth smoothly as if there were water beneath the rower. The slides can be connected in rows or columns so that rowers are forced to move together on the ergometer, similarly to the way they would match up their rhythm in a boat.

Indoor rowers usually also display estimates of rowing boat speed and energy used by the athlete.

== Use ==
=== Exercise ===
Rowing is an example of a method of aerobic exercise, which has been observed to improve athletes' VO_{2} peak. Indoor rowing primarily works the cardiovascular systems with typical workouts consisting of steady pieces of 20–40 minutes.

The standard measurement of speed on an ergometer is generally known as the "split", or the amount of time in minutes and seconds required to travel 500 metres (1,600 ft) at the current pace. Other standard measurement units on the indoor rowing machine include calories and watts.

=== Testing ===
Although ergometer tests are used by rowing coaches to evaluate rowers and are part of athlete selection for many senior and junior national rowing teams, data suggests "physiological and performance tests performed on a rowing ergometer are not good indicators of on-water performance".

Some standard indoor rower ergometer tests include: 250 m ergometer test, 2000 m ergometer test, 5 km ergometer test, 16 km ergometer test and the 30-minute ergometer test.

== Technique ==
Rowing on an ergometer requires four basic phases to complete one stroke; the catch, the drive, the finish and the recovery. The catch is the initial part of the stroke. The drive is where the power from the rower is generated while the finish is the final part of the stroke. Then, the recovery is the initial phase to begin taking a new stroke. The phases repeat until a time duration or a distance is completed. At each stage of the stroke, the back should remain in a neutral, flat position, pivoting at the hips to avoid injury.

=== Catch ===
Knees are bent with the shins in a vertical position. The back should be roughly parallel to the thigh without hyperflexion (leaning forward too far). The arms and shoulders should be extended forward and relaxed. The arms should also be level.

=== Drive ===
The drive is initiated by a push and extension of the legs; the body remains in the catch posture at this point of the drive. As the legs continue to full extension, the hip angle opens and the rower engages the core to begin the motion of the body levering backward, adding to the work of the legs. When the legs are fully extended, the rower begins to pull the handle toward the chest with their arms, completing the stroke with the handle halfway up the body and the forearms parallel to the ground.

=== Finish (or release) ===
The legs are at full extension and flat. The shoulders are slightly behind the pelvis, and the arms are in full contraction with the elbows bent and hands against the chest below the nipples. The back of the rower is still maintained in an upright posture and wrists should be flat.

=== Recovery ===
The recovery is a slow slide back to the initial part of the stroke, it gives the rower time to recover from the previous stroke. During the recovery, the actions are in reverse order of the drive. The recovery is initiated by the extensions of the arms until fully extended in front of the body. The torso is then engaged by pivoting at the hips to move the torso in front of the hips. Weight transfers from the back of the seat to the front of the seat at this time. When the hands come over the knees, the legs are bent at the knees, moving the slide towards the front of the machine. As the back becomes more parallel to the thighs, the recovery is completed when the shins are perpendicular to the ground. At this point the recovery transitions to the catch for the next stroke.

== Sport ==
The first indoor rowing competition was held in Cambridge, Massachusetts, in February 1982 with participation of 96 on-water rowers who called themselves the "Charles River Association of Sculling Has-Beens", hence the acronym, "CRASH-B". The core events for indoor rowing competitions that are currently competed in at the World Rowing Indoor Championships are the individual 500m, individual 2000m, individual 1 hour, and 3-minute teams event. Events at other indoor rowing competitions include the mile and the 2500-meter.

Most competitions are organised into categories based on sex, age, and weight class.

=== Esports ===
Various indoor exercise softwares such as MyWhoosh, Kinomap, and EXR (app) allow for users to do workouts or races online against other rowers via an indoor rower.

In December 2023, the International Olympic Committee partnered with Kinomap to allow users to simulate Paris 2024 Olympic courses on indoor rowers.

== See also ==
- Rowbike
- Rowing
- Rowing tank
- Row (weight-lifting)
- List of world best times in rowing
