= Rowing club =

Clubs to enable the sport of rowing

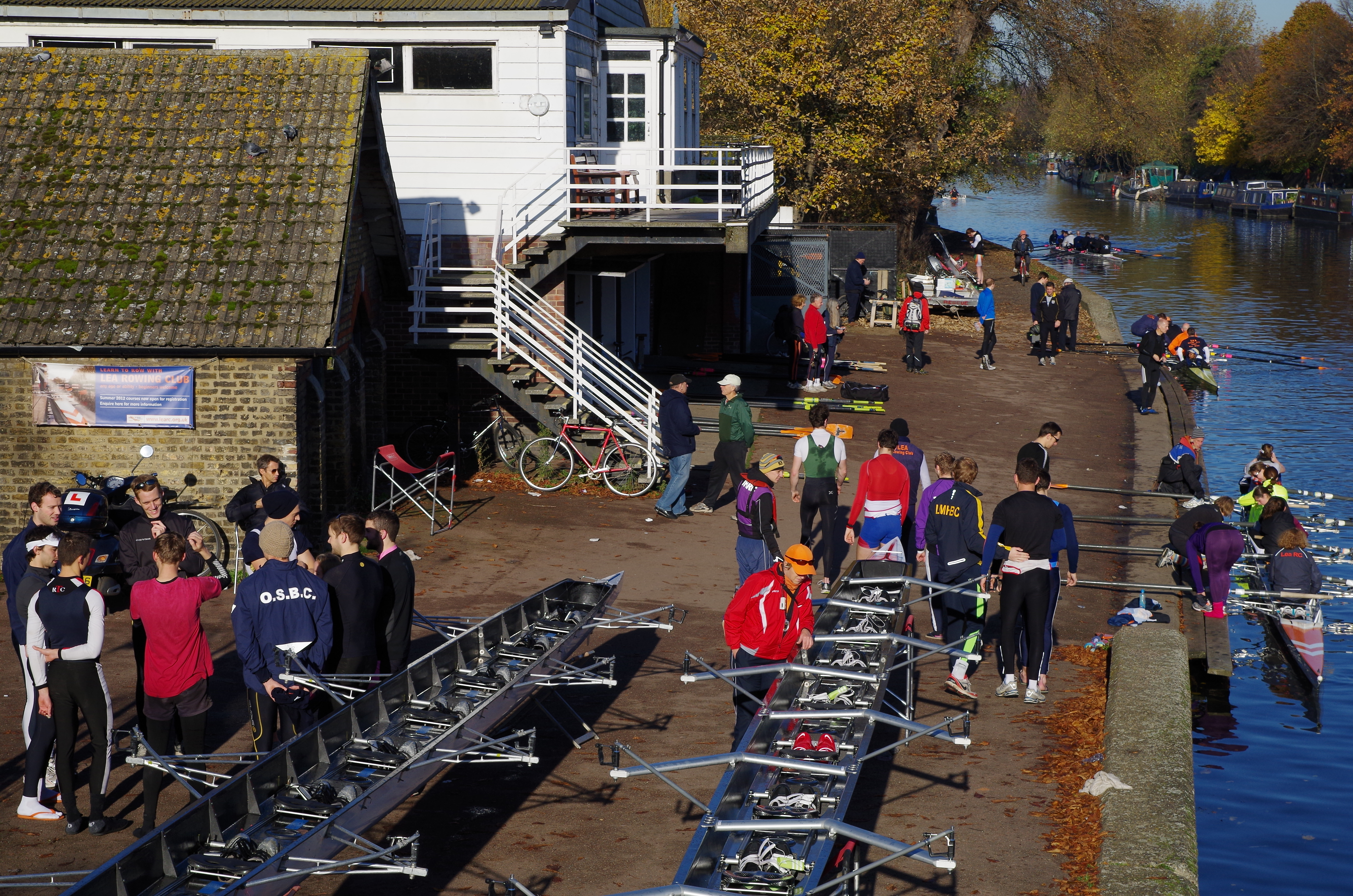
Lea Rowing Club, a local club on the Lea Navigation in London

A rowing club is a club for people interested in the sport of rowing. Rowing clubs are usually near a body of water, either natural or artificial, that is large enough for maneuvering the rowing boats. Clubs usually have a boathouse with racks to store boats, and a dock or slipway to get them into the water. Many clubs host rowing competitions, known as regattas or head races, and send teams to compete in other regattas and head races.

There are also indoor rowing clubs, where training and competition centers on ergs (rowing machines). There are indoor rowing regattas, such as CRASH-B Sprints which takes place every winter in Boston.

There are also rowing clubs without their own boathouses or equipment. For example, many high schools and universities maintain an alumni rowing club. Members of these clubs typically train on their own and meet up with their fellow club members to race. The club status must be maintained in order to participate in events sanctioned by British Rowing, USRowing, or other governing bodies.

== See also ==
- Rowing (sport)
- List of rowing blades
- List of water sports
