= Irina Fetisova (swimmer and rower) =

Soviet swimmer and rower

Personal information
- Born: Irina Ivanovna Fetisova; 30 October 1956 (age 69) Saint Petersburg, Russia

Sport
- Sport: Swimming; Rowing
- Club: Soviet Army Club (SKA)
Medal record
Representing the Soviet Union
Women's swimming
European Championships
Bronze medal – third place	1974 Vienna	200 m medley
Women's rowing
World Rowing Championships
Bronze medal – third place	1981 Munich	Single scull
Gold medal – first place	1982 Lucerne	Single scull
Silver medal – second place	1983 Duisburg	Single scull

Irina Ivanovna Fetisova (Russian: Ирина Ивановна Фетисова, later Irina Pimenova; born 30 October 1956) is a retired Soviet swimmer and rower.

== Swimming ==
Fetisova was swimming for SKA Leningrad (the Soviet Army Club) and was a member of the Soviet national team from 1970 to 1976. In 1974, she won a national title in the 100 m breaststroke event. At the 1974 European Aquatics Championships, she won a bronze medal in the individual 200 m medley setting a new national record. She finished her swimming career in 1976 and switched to rowing.

== Rowing ==
In 1977, she became a member of the Soviet national rowing team. She went to the 1977 World Rowing Championships in Amsterdam and came fifth with the coxed quad scull team. She dropped out of the national rowing team after her initial year and became a member again from 1981 to 1984, when she competed in single scull. At the 1981 World Rowing Championships in Munich, she won a bronze medal in her new boat class. She became women's single scull world champion at the 1982 World Rowing Championships in Lucerne, Switzerland. At the 1983 World Rowing Championships in Duisburg, Germany, she won a silver medal. In 1984, she changed to coxed quad scull, displaced by Mariya Danyliuk in the single sculls. She did not go to the 1984 Summer Olympics due to the boycott led by the Soviet Union. Instead, she competed at the Friendship Games, also dubbed the "alternative Olympics", and won first place with the coxed quad sculls. She finished her rowing career in that year.

Fetisova was awarded the Order of the Badge of Honour for her success in rowing.
