= Antonina Makhina =

Russian rower (born 1958)

Personal information
- Born: 4 March 1958 (age 68) Ryazan, Russian SFSR, Soviet Union
Medal record
Women's rowing
Olympic Games
Representing Soviet Union
Silver medal – second place	1980 Moscow	Single sculls
Silver medal – second place	1988 Seoul	Quad sculls
Representing Unified Team
Bronze medal – third place	1992 Barcelona	Quad sculls
World Rowing Championships
Gold medal – first place	1981 Munich	Double sculls
Gold medal – first place	1982 Lucerne	Double sculls
Silver medal – second place	1983 Duisburg	Double sculls
Silver medal – second place	Hazewinkel 1985	Quad sculls
Bronze medal – third place	1986 Nottingham	Single sculls
Bronze medal – third place	1987 Copenhagen	Quad sculls

Antonina Viktorovna Makhina-Dumcheva-Zelikovich (Russian: Антонина Викторовна Махина-Думчева-Зеликович; born 4 March 1958 in Ryazan) is a Russian rower. She competed for the Soviet Union in the 1980 and 1988 Summer Olympics and for the Unified Team at the 1992 Summer Olympics.
