= Ann Haesebrouck =

Belgian rower (born 1963)

Medal record

Women's Rowing

Representing Belgium

Olympic Games
Bronze medal – third place	1984 Los Angeles	Single sculls

Ann Haesebrouck (born 18 October 1963 in Bruges, Belgium) is a rower from Belgium.

She competed for Belgium in the 1984 Summer Olympics held in Los Angeles, United States in the single sculls event where she finished in third place. she returned to the 1988 Summer Olympics where she finished sixth as part of the Belgian Quadruple sculls team and again in 1992 Summer Olympics where she finished ninth as part of the Belgian double sculls team.
