= Lise Justesen =

Danish rower

Personal information
- Full name: Lise Marianne Justesen
- Nationality: Danish
- Born: 5 September 1961 (age 63); Odense, Denmark

Sport
- Sport: Rowing

Lise Marianne Justesen (born 5 September 1961) is a Danish rower. She competed at the 1980 Summer Olympics and the 1984 Summer Olympics.
