= María Fernanda de la Fuente =

Mexican rower (born 1955)

Personal information
- Full name: María Fernanda de la Fuente Torre
- Nationality: Mexican
- Born: 6 March 1955 (age 71)
- Died: 29 February 2016

Sport
- Sport: Rowing
Medal record
Women's rowing
Representing Mexico
Pan American Games
| Silver medal – second place | 1983 Caracas | Single sculls |

María Fernanda de la Fuente Torre (born 6 March 1955) is a Mexican rower. She competed at the 1980 Summer Olympics and the 1984 Summer Olympics.
