= Row (weight-lifting) =

Weight training exercise that primarily utilizes the lat muscles

In strength training, rowing (or a row, usually preceded by a qualifying adjective — for instance a cable seated row, barbell upright row, dumbbell bent-over row, T-bar rows, et cetera) is an exercise where the purpose is to strengthen the muscles that draw the rower's arms toward the body (latissimus dorsi) as well as those that retract the scapulae (trapezius and rhomboids) and those that support the spine (erector spinae). When done on a rowing machine, rowing also exercises muscles that extend and support the legs (quadriceps and thigh muscles). In all cases, the abdominal and lower back muscles must be used in order to support the body and prevent back injury.

Many other weight-assisted gym exercises mimic the movement of rowing, such as the deadlift, high pull and the bent-over row. An effective off-season training programme combines both erg pieces and weight-assisted movements similar to rowing, with an emphasis on improving endurance under high tension rather than maximum strength.

== Gallery ==
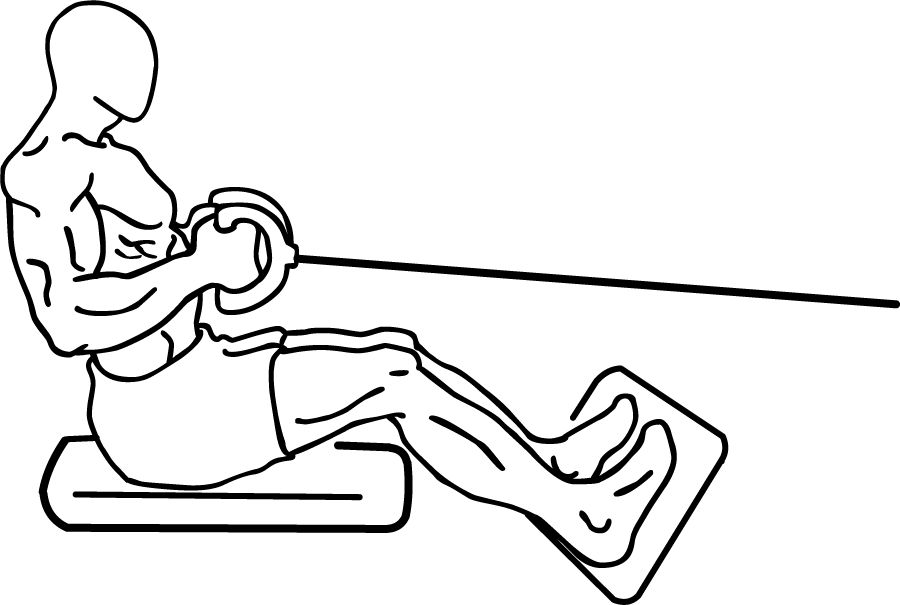
Cable seated row (position 1, flexion)

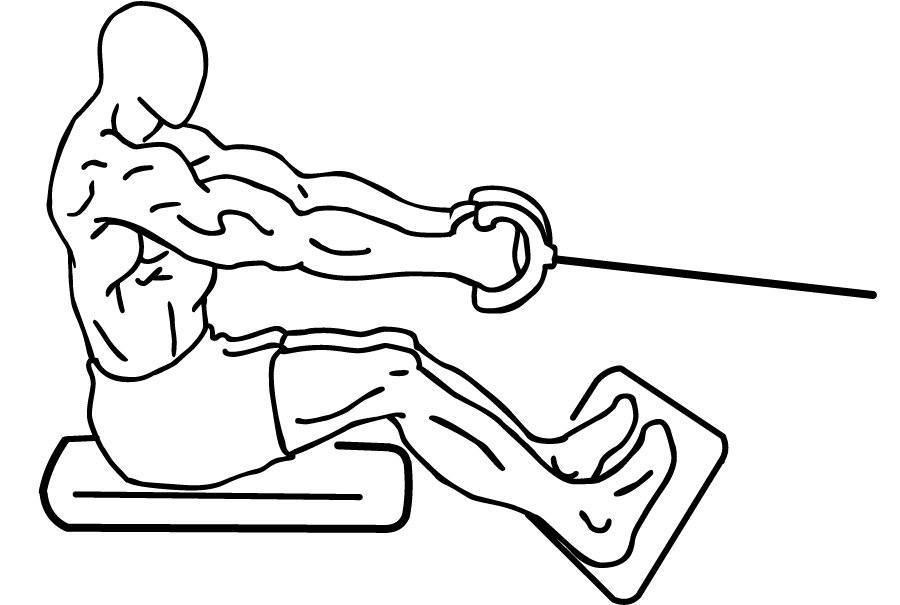
Cable seated row (position 2, extension)

== See also ==
- Bent-over row
- Upright row
- Supine row
- Indoor rower
