= Annelie Larsson =

Swedish rower

Personal information
- Nationality: Swedish
- Born: 23 August 1964 (age 60); Stockholm, Sweden

Sport
- Sport: Rowing

Annelie Larsson (born 23 August 1964) is a Swedish rower. She competed at the 1984 Summer Olympics and the 1988 Summer Olympics.
