= Judy Geer =

American rower

Personal information
- Born: July 11, 1953 (age 71); New York City, United States

Sport
- Sport: Rowing

Judy Geer (born July 11, 1953) is an American rower. She competed at the 1976 Summer Olympics and the 1984 Summer Olympics.
