= Oar =

Implement used for water-borne propulsion

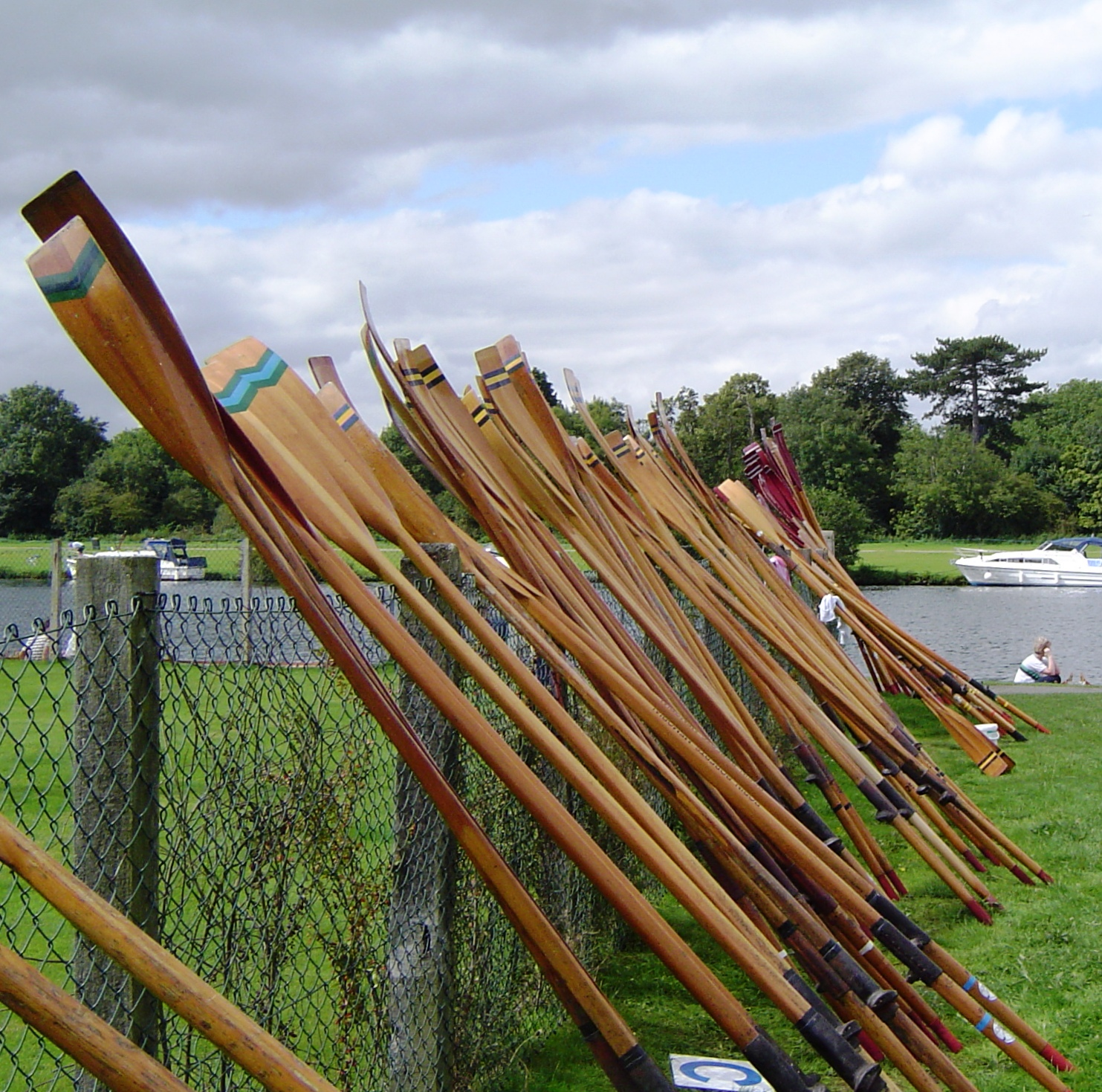
Traditional wooden oars

An oar is an implement used for water-borne propulsion. Oars have a flat blade at one end. Rowers grasp the oar at the other end.

The difference between oars and paddles is that oars are used exclusively for rowing. In rowing the oar is connected to the vessel by means of a pivot point for the oar, either an oarlock, or a thole pin. The oar is placed in the pivot point with a short portion inside the vessel, and a much larger portion outside. The rower pulls on the short end of the oar, while the long end is in the water. By contrast, paddles are held in both hands by the paddler, and are not attached to the vessel.

Rowers generally face the stern of the vessel, reach towards the stern, and insert the blade of their oar in the water. As they lean back, towards the vessel's bow, the blade of their oars pivots in the oarlock, and the end in the water moves towards the stern, providing forward thrust.

For thousands of years vessels were powered either by sails, or by the mechanical work of rowers, or by paddlers. It is common for an oar propelled vessel to also have the option to be powered by sail, both in antiquity (for instance the galley) and more recently.

== History ==
Rowing oars have been used since the early Neolithic period. Wooden oars, with canoe-shaped pottery, dating from 5000–4500 BC have been discovered in a Hemudu culture site at Yuyao, Zhejiang, in modern China. In 1999, an oar measuring 63.4 cm (2 ft) in length, dating from 4000 BC, was unearthed in Ishikawa Prefecture, Japan.

Athletes of the sport of rowing use oars to propel their racing shell.

== Construction ==
Oars have traditionally been made of wood. The form is a long shaft (or loom) with a flat blade on the end. Where the oar connects to the boat there is a "collar" (or button), often made of leather, which stops the oar slipping past the rowlock. Oars usually have a handle about 150mm long, which may be a material sleeve or alternatively an ovoid shape carved to fit the hands.

== Physics ==
Oars are levers. Which class of lever depends on the frame of reference. From the rower's perspective, the oar can be seen as a Class I lever. The oar is fixed in the oarlock, the rower pulls on the handle, and the blade moves in the opposite direction to propel the boat. The blade is further from the oarlock than the rower's hands. So, the heavy force of a short rowing motion becomes a smaller force over a greater distance.

From an observer on the shore, the oar is instead a Class II lever. Here, the fulcrum is the blade, planted in the water. The rower pulls on the handle and the boat moves along with them. The "Class II" perspective is important to competitive rowing. Effective rowers learn to lever the boat past the end of the blade, rather than pulling the blade through the water. The World Rowing Federation rulebook defines oars as Class II.

Both the Class I and Class II perspectives can be used to calculate the forces on the rower, boat, and water, with equivalent results. The calculations are simpler for the Class I perspective. The mechanical advantage of the oar depends on the length of the oar from the oarlock to the blade, compared to the length from the oarlock to the rower's hand(s). The further away from the oarlock the blade is, the more difficult it is to row and the more distance each stroke will move.

== Balanced oar ==
This is a normal, usually wooden oar to which weight has been added at the inboard end so that the blade end is noticeably lighter and easier for a rower to operate without fatigue. The two methods of adding weight are to either have a much larger section in the oar immediately next to the handle for a distance of about 450 millimetres (18 in) or to drill an 18-millimetre (0.71 in) hole inside the handle for a distance of about 150 millimetres (5.9 in) and add about 12 oz of lead secured by epoxy resin glue. For a 7-foot (2.1 m) oar the balance point is about 12 inches outboard of the rowlock. Often surplus wood is removed from the blade's width and thickness and at the neck between the blade and the shaft to further reduce outboard weight. As the rower is expending less energy accelerating the (now-reduced) mass of the oar back-and-forth, and will experience less fatigue constantly exerting downward force on the handle (vs. an unbalanced version) -- this type of oar is more efficient and thus preferable for long-range rowing.

== Oars used for transport ==
The oars used for transport come in a variety of sizes. The oars used in small dinghies or rafts can be less than 2 metres long. In classical times warships were propelled by very long oars that might have several oarsmen per oar. These oars could be more than a dozen metres long. According to Callixenus, as cited by Athenaeus, in the great ship of Ptolemy the oars of the upper tier were over 50 feet (15 m) in length with handles leaded so as to equalize the weight inboard and outboard.

== Oars used for competitive rowing ==
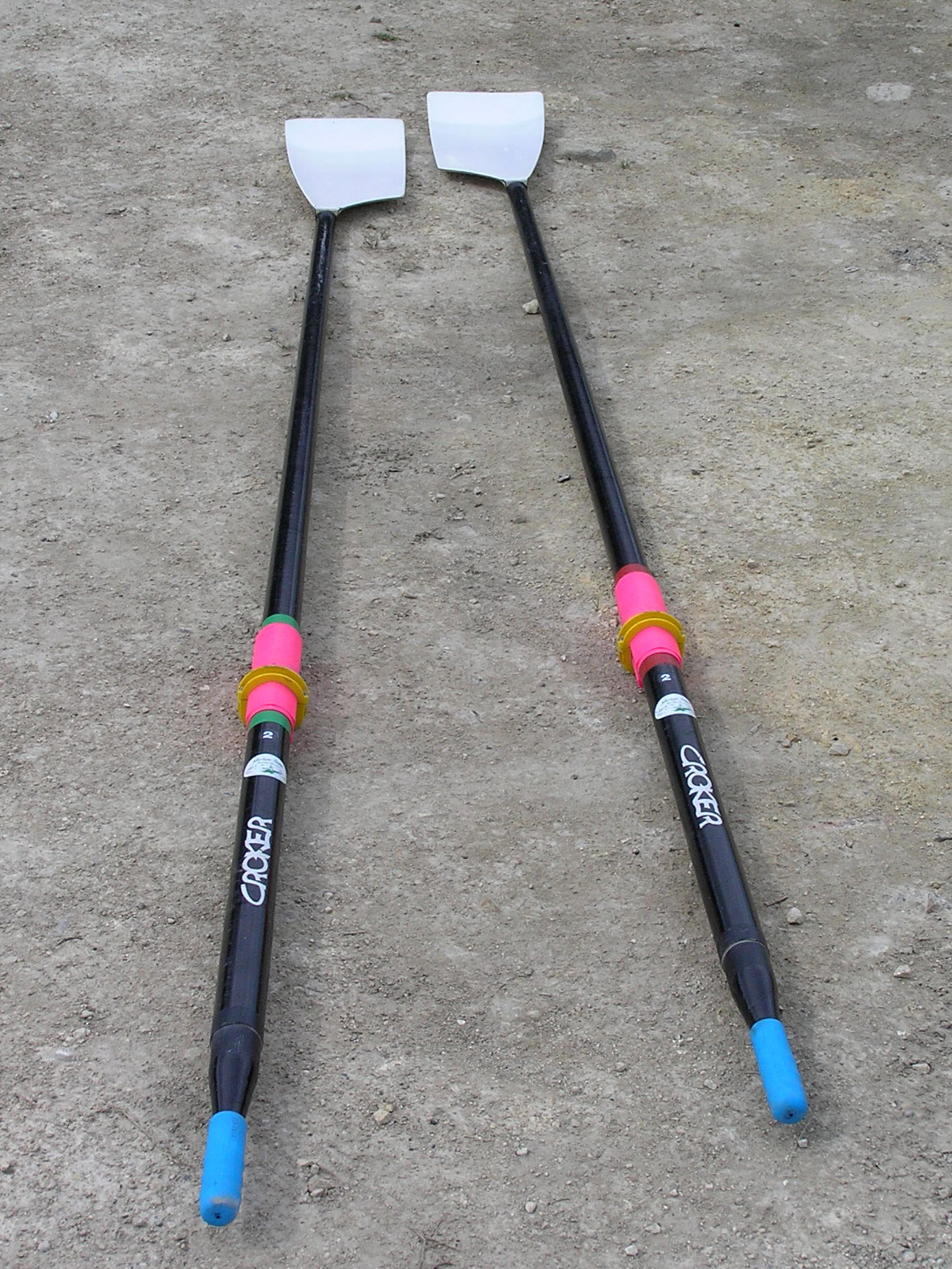
A pair of carbon fibre sculling oars used for sport rowing

The oars used in competitive rowing are long (250–300 cm) poles with one flat end about 50 cm long and 25 cm wide, called the blade. The part of the oar the oarsman holds while rowing is called the handle. While rowing, the oars are supported by metal frames attached to the side of the boat called riggers, while the oar fits into the oarlocks at the ends of each rigger. Classic oars were made of wood, but modern oars are made from synthetic material, the most common being carbon fibre.

== Oars used as trophies ==
The sport of competitive rowing has developed a tradition of using an oar as a memento of significant race wins. A 'trophy oar' is not presented at the end of the race as a more familiar precious metal cup might be, but rather given by the club, school or university that the winning crew or rower represented.

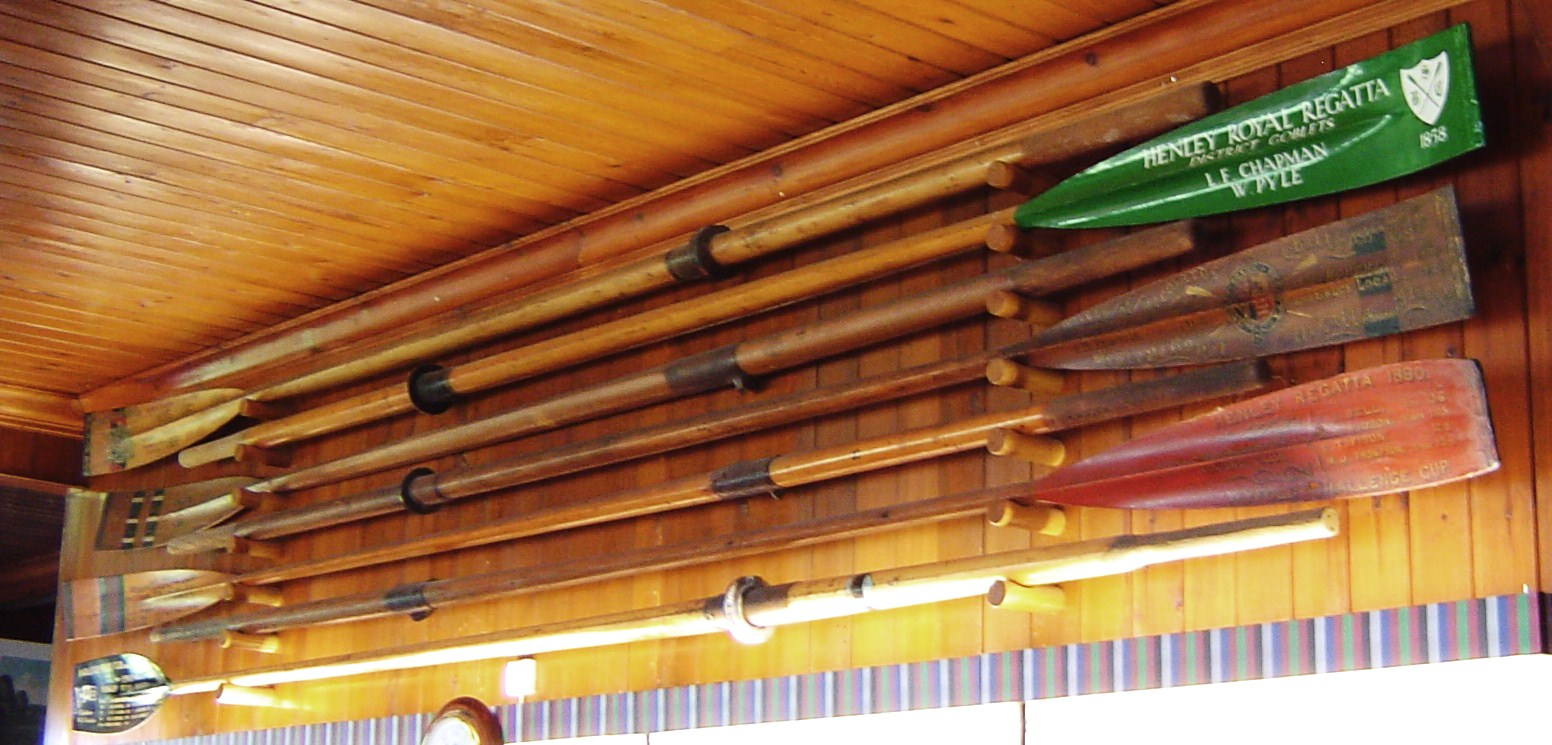
Trophy oars of the seven founding member clubs of the Remenham Club

A trophy oar is a competition oar that has been painted in the club colours and has then had the details of the race signwritten on the face of the blade. The most common format has the coat of arms or crest of the club or school positioned in the centre, with the crew names and the race details arranged around this.

Many older universities (Oxford and Cambridge for example, as well as Yale and Harvard) and their colleges have long histories of using the trophy oar and many examples are on display in club houses around the world.

== In culture ==
Crossed silver oars in the coat of arms of Enonkoski

In Norway, both Fedje Municipality and Herøy Municipality both have oars in their coat of arms.

Oars have been used to describe various animals with characteristics that closely resemble the said rowing implement. The members of the Family Regalecidae, elongated deep-sea fishes, are called oarfish because their body shape is similar to that of an oar. The hawksbill turtle's genus of Eretmochelys is derived from the Greek root eretmo, which roughly translates to oar. The turtle was so-named because of the oar-like shape of its front flippers.

== See also ==
- Oar (sport rowing)
- Sculling
- Steering oar
- Paddle
