= Single scull =

Type of rowing boat

Single scull icon

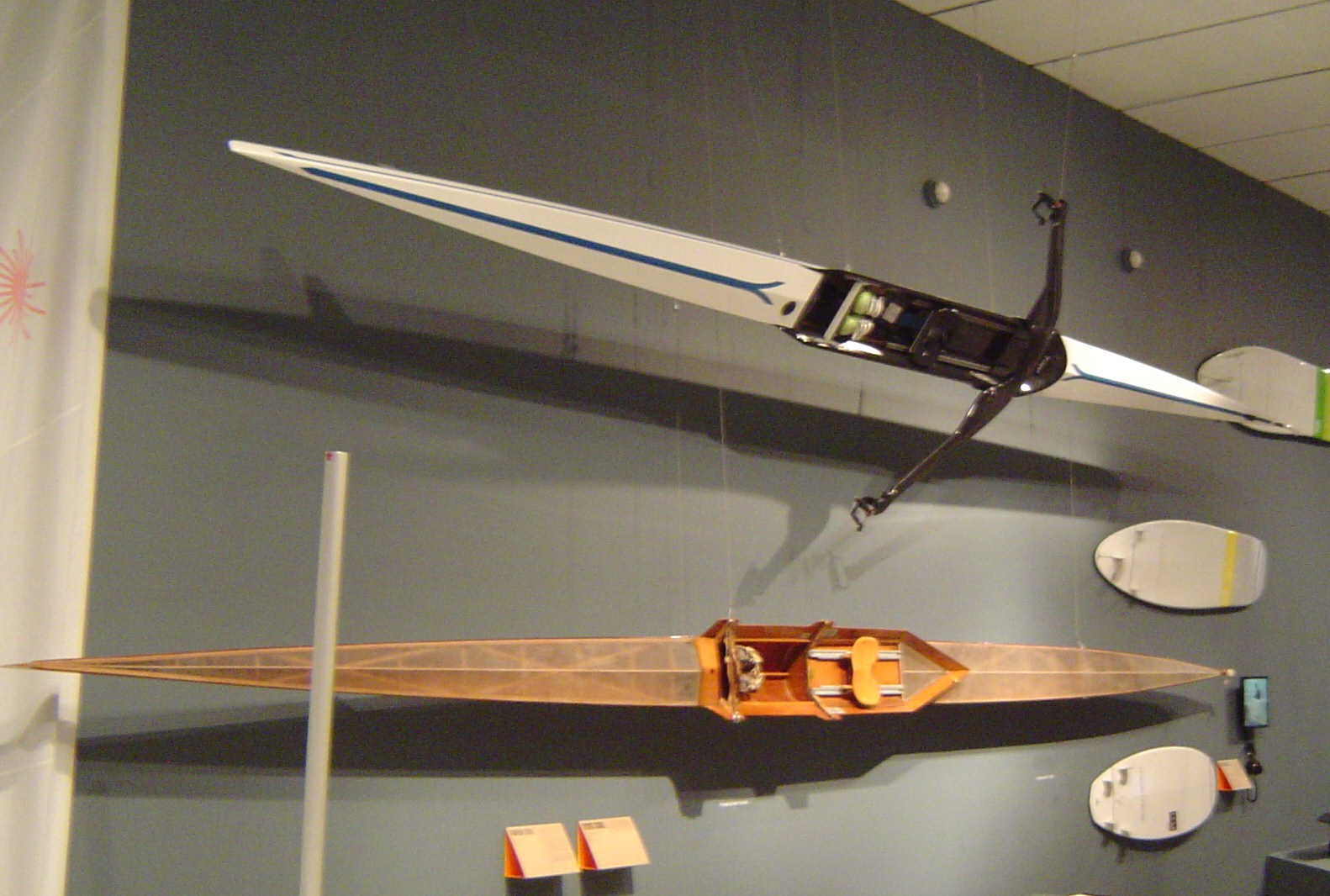
Modern composite single scull, above a 1920s wooden single scull

A single scull (also known as a scull or 1x) racing shell is a boat used in the sculling category of the sport of rowing where a single person, referred to as a sculler, propels the boat with two oars, one in each hand.

== Design and construction ==
Racing boats (often called "shells") are long, narrow, and broadly semi-circular in cross-section in order to minimize drag. They have riggers, which apply the forces exerted by the sculler symmetrically to each side of the boat and (usually) a fin towards the rear which helps prevent roll and yaw. Originally made from wood, shells are now almost always made from a composite material (usually carbon-fibre reinforced plastic) for strength and weight advantages.

Recreational single sculls tend to be shorter and a little wider than racing boats and can have a slightly flattened hull shape to provide more stability. Recreational single sculls can be made of a variety of materials including carbon fiber, fiberglass, wood or rotomoulded polyethylene.

A single Thames skiff has a similar layout to a single scull but is clinker-built with fixed seats and tholes instead of outriggers and can be skiffed for leisure outings or in competitive races.

== Competitive rowing class ==
The single scull class is recognized by the World Rowing and the Olympics, who set the minimum weight of the hull at 14 kg (31 lb). The minimum length is 7.2 m (24 ft) with an average length of around 8.2 m (27 ft). The typical beam is about 28 cm (11 in) and draft about 17 cm (6.7 in). The regulations also specify a maximum Oar length of 300 cm (9.8 ft).

The single scull is the 2nd slowest category of racing boat (faster than the coxed pair), and competitors are recognised by other rowers as among the toughest, both physically and mentally: single sculling is sometimes known as 'king's class'.

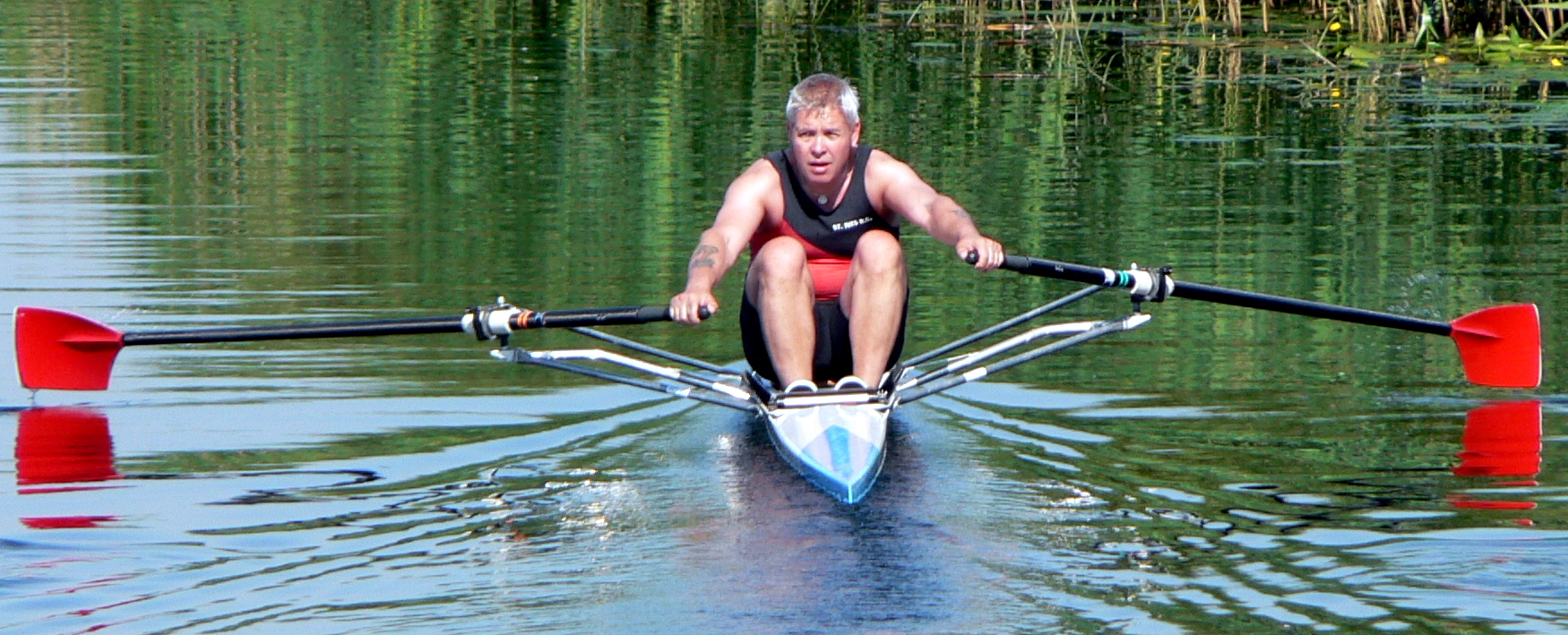
Sculler on the Great Ouse river, England

Single sculls are also used for the training of team rowers, serving primarily to enhance the rowers' individual technique and watermanship. The main reason for this is that in the single scull the sculler is responsible for all movement in the boat and therefore receives direct feedback on the effect of their movements on balance and speed.

Single sculling time trials and races are sometimes used to measure individuals' rowing ability for selection into larger boats, since each rower's ability can be measured directly and there is no contribution from other crew members. However sculling ability and sweep-oar rowing ability are not the same. Powerful and accomplished sweep-oar rowers may be unable to demonstrate their ability in a single scull, where balance and technique are more critical.

== Major competitions ==
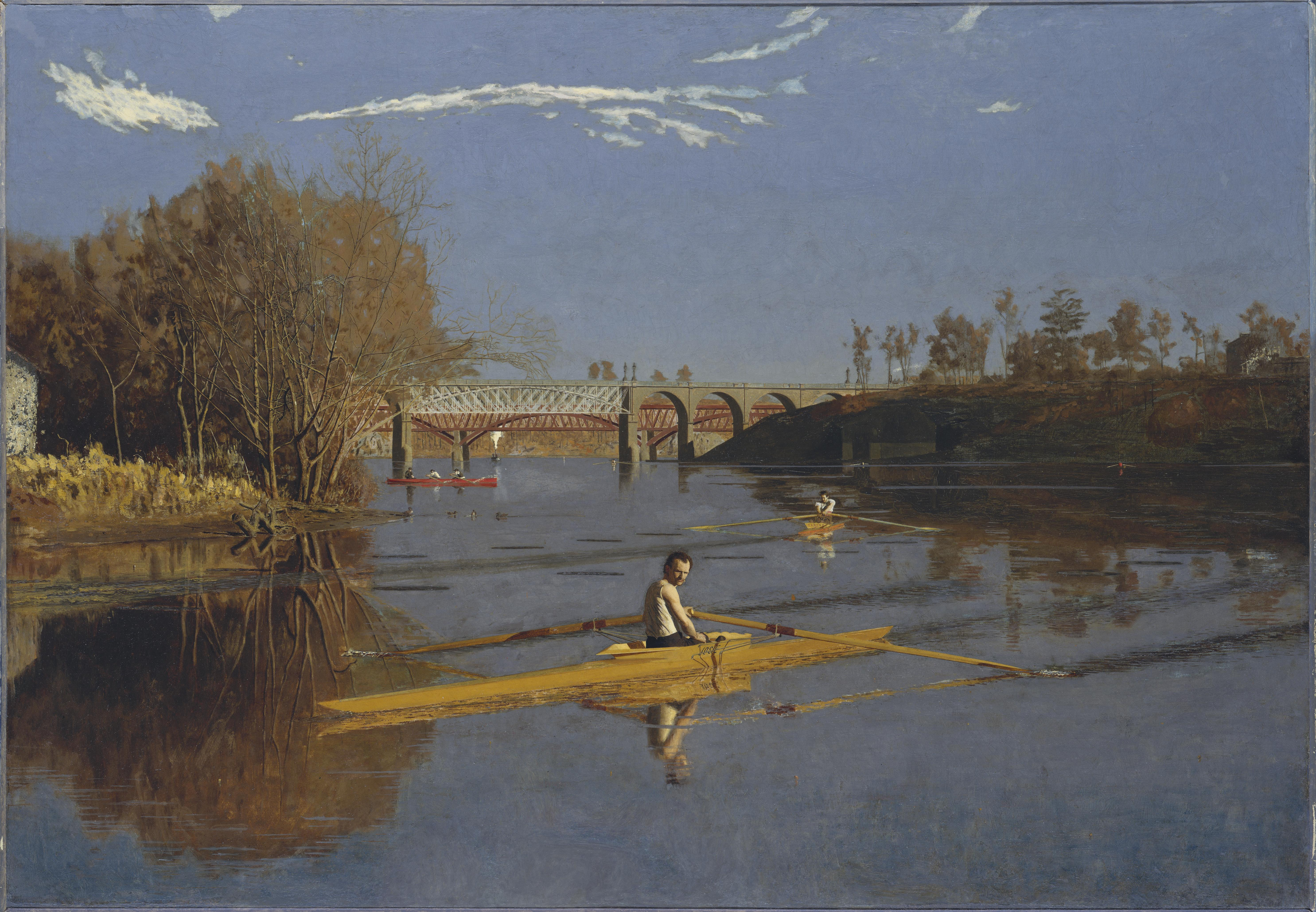
Max Schmitt in a single scull (1871) by painter Thomas Eakins.

=== Wingfield Sculls ===
The Wingfield Sculls is a rowing race held annually on the River Thames in London, England, on the 4 1/4 miles (6.8 km) Championship Course from Putney to Mortlake.

=== World Sculling Championship ===
The World Sculling Championship (1863–1957), evolved from the Championship of the Thames for professional scullers.

=== Diamond Challenge Sculls ===
The Diamond Challenge Sculls is a rowing event for men's single sculls at the annual Henley Royal Regatta on the River Thames at Henley-on-Thames in England. First run in 1844, it is open to male scullers from all eligible rowing clubs.

=== Single sculls at the Olympics ===
The single sculls is a rowing event held at the Summer Olympics. The event was first held for men at the second modern Olympics in 1900, and has been held every Games since. The women's competition was added in 1976.

=== World Rowing Championships ===
The World Rowing Championships is an international rowing regatta organized by FISA (the International Rowing Federation). It is a week-long event held at the end of the northern hemisphere summer and in non-Olympic years is the highlight of the international rowing calendar.

=== World best times ===
In 2002 Bulgarian sculler Rumyana Neykova achieved a world best time of 7 minutes 7.71 seconds in the F1x class at the World Rowing Championships in Seville, Spain.

As of 2017 New Zealand sculler Robbie Manson set a world best time for the M1x class of 6:30.74 over 2,000 m (1.2 mi) at the World Rowing Championships in Poznań, Poland.

== See also ==
- Double scull
- Quad scull
