= Mystery of the Winged Lion =

1982 novel by Carolyn Keene

- Cover of first edition
- Author: Carolyn Keene
- Cover artist: Ruth Sanderson
- Language: English
- Series: Nancy Drew stories
- Genre: Detective, mystery novel
- Published: 1982 Wanderer Books
- Publication place: United States
- Media type: Print (hardback & paperback)
- Preceded by: Captive Witness
- Followed by: Race Against Time (Nancy Drew)

Mystery of the Winged Lion is the 65th novel in the Nancy Drew mystery series by Carolyn Keene. It was originally published by Wanderer Books, an imprint of Simon & Schuster, in 1982.

== Plot summary ==
Nancy, Bess, and George visit Venice on vacation. When they arrive, they stumble across an attempted break-in at a glass factory. They also discover that their friends- including Nancy's boyfriend Ned Nickerson - have been detained at customs and are now in jail. The hotel concierge gives Nancy a mysterious note.

Ned tells the girls that the customs officials found a glass art piece- a horse with golden hooves- in his luggage, but they dropped it and it broke. Nancy tries to explain the situation, but the boys are not released. She's told not to do any more detective work while she's in Venice. Ignoring this, Nancy tries to investigate the note. A friendly gondolier explains that it's a cry for help, but that the letter's signature has been washed away except for the initials D.D. As Nancy returns to the hotel, someone tries to push her into the canal.

Nancy finds the mysterious D.D.- Duchessa Dandolo, an elderly woman who's heard of Nancy's skills. She asks for Nancy's help- her nephew Filippo, a master glassmaker, has been kidnapped, and has sent her a note begging for help! The Duchessa is afraid of the consequences if she gets the police involved, and asks for Nancy's help. Nancy agrees to help the Duchessa if the Duchessa can pull some strings and get the boys released.

Nancy continues to investigate, and discovers that the kidnappers actually wanted to kidnap Filippo's father, Claudio, to steal his secret glass formula. Claudio went into hiding and so they kidnapped Filippo instead. Filipo signed his note with a winged lion; Nancy decides to investigate St. Mark's Basilica. But as the girls investigate, they're caught and kidnapped!

The boys are released from prison and try to find the girls, with no luck. With the help of a priest, Nancy, Bess, and George escape; they meet back up with the boys, and try to get in contact with the Duchessa again. But she's acting strange, and says that she doesn't need to meet up with Nancy. Later, though, she calls Nancy and tries to arrange a meeting in Murano late at night.

Nancy agrees to the meeting, but assumes it's a trap and disguises herself. To no one's surprise, it is a trap; the kidnappers also got the Duchess and tried to force her to give them the formula. Nancy rescues her, and keeps her meeting with the kidnappers, stalling for time by describing her deductions. The police arrive, rescue her, and arrest the kidnappers.

Filippo is rescued, and the heroes gather for a farewell dinner, where Nancy is given a glass etching as a parting gift.

== Publication history ==
According to David Farah, Mystery of the Winged Lion was ghostwritten by Nancy Axelrad and edited by Lilo Wuenn. The working title for the book, as mentioned at the end of the previous volume, was The Gondolier's Secret.

Some editions of Lion contain greyscale drawings by Paul Frame; the French Hachette editions contain colour drawings by Jean-Louis Mercier.

== International Editions ==
Mystery of the Winged Lion was published internationally by:

- Armada Books in the United Kingdom
- Forlagshuset Vigmostad & Bjørke in Norway
- Hachette Books in France
- Tammi (company) in Finland
- Wahlström & Widstrand in Sweden
