= The Elusive Heiress =

1982 novel by Carolyn Keene

- Cover of the 1982 Wanderer Books edition
- Author: Carolyn Keene
- Cover artist: Ruth Sanderson
- Language: English
- Series: Nancy Drew stories
- Genre: Detective, mystery novel
- Published: 1982 Wanderer Books
- Publication place: United States
- Media type: Print (hardback & paperback)
- Preceded by: The Sinister Omen
- Followed by: Clue in the Ancient Disguise

The Elusive Heiress is the 68th novel in the Nancy Drew mystery series by Carolyn Keene. It was originally published by Wanderer Books, an imprint of Simon & Schuster, in 1982, with reprints by Pocket Books.

The outline and manuscript for The Elusive Heiress were ghostwritten by Sharon Wagner; the book was edited by Nancy Axelrad.

== Plot summary ==
Nancy's father asks her to travel to Cheyenne, Wyoming to find Clarinda Winthrop, the missing daughter of millionaire Arlo Winthrop.

At the airport, Nancy and her boyfriend Ned Nickerson are asked to take care of a young girl named Jennifer, who's getting sent home from boarding school. However, Jennifer's mother doesn't come to pick her up from the airport, and a stranger tries to kidnap her. Nancy must thus solve two mysteries: where is Clarinda, and where is Jennifer's mother?

Nancy investigates both disappearances, with many Western-themed adventures along the way. She rides in a float in a parade, travels in a stagecoach, and visits a rodeo. Nancy discovers that Clarinda has been using an assumed name; she married a young man named Leroy Caitlin, who was falsely accused of participating in a bank robbery, and the couple skipped town. As Nancy investigates, she also discovers that something is amiss with her father, who was supposed to come meet her in town.

Nancy discovers that Jennifer is Clarinda's granddaughter- and Jennifer gets kidnapped! Nancy also discovers that her father has fallen afoul of the same kidnappers. She must rescue both Jennifer and her father, discover the identity of the kidnappers - and their connection to Arlo Winthrop- and ensure justice is done.

== International editions ==
The Elusive Heiress was published internationally by:

- Armada Books in the United Kingdom
- Forlagshuset Vigmostad & Bjørke in Norway
- Indira Publishing in Indonesia
- Tammi (company) in Finland
