= Rebecca Wexelsen =

Norwegian poet, novelist and children's writer

Rebecca Wexelsen (born 1986) is a Norwegian poet, novelist and children's writer.

Her literary debut was the poetry collection Så faller jeg (2017), published by Tiden. It was almost entirely overlooked in the media.

Her subsequent books on Tiden were novels: Hotell Montebello (2019), Jeg er ingen (2022) and Når jeg løper (2024). Hotell Montebello was reviewed by several newspapers, and getting dice throws of 5 in Dagbladet and 4 in Adresseavisen and Stavanger Aftenblad. Hotell Montebello was furthermore reviewed by Klassekampen, Morgenbladet, Dag og Tid and Åsane Tidende.

Wexelsen's children's books Ulf er uvel (2020) and Mormor til salgs (2021) were published by Ena Forlag. A short story collection for adolescents, Dunkle fortellinger (2022), came out on Vigmostad & Bjørke.
