= Libreria Acqua Alta =

Italian bookstore

- Location: Venice, Italy
- Coordinates: 45.4432°N 12.3345°E
- Address: C. Longa Santa Maria Formosa 5176b, Campiello del Tintor, 30122 Venice, Italy
- Opened: 2002
- Owner: Luigi Frizzo
- Website: https://www.libreriacqualta.it/en/the-bookstore/

Libreria Acqua Alta (English: High Water Bookstore) is an independently owned and operated Italian-language bookstore opened in 2002 by Luigi Frizzo, located less than a mile from Piazza San Marco in Venice, Italy.

Acqua Alta is characterized as a mix between "a library and flea market", consisting of used and new books of various genres, stacked along the walls and placed in gondolas. The bookstore contains a popular fire exit towards the back of the store, allowing visitors to stand toe-to-toe with a canal. In addition, the bookstore offers another view of the canals; towards the back of the bookstore stands a staircase made entirely of books. Despite the rising sea levels causing a flood in the store, the books remain unharmed, due to their manner of storage.

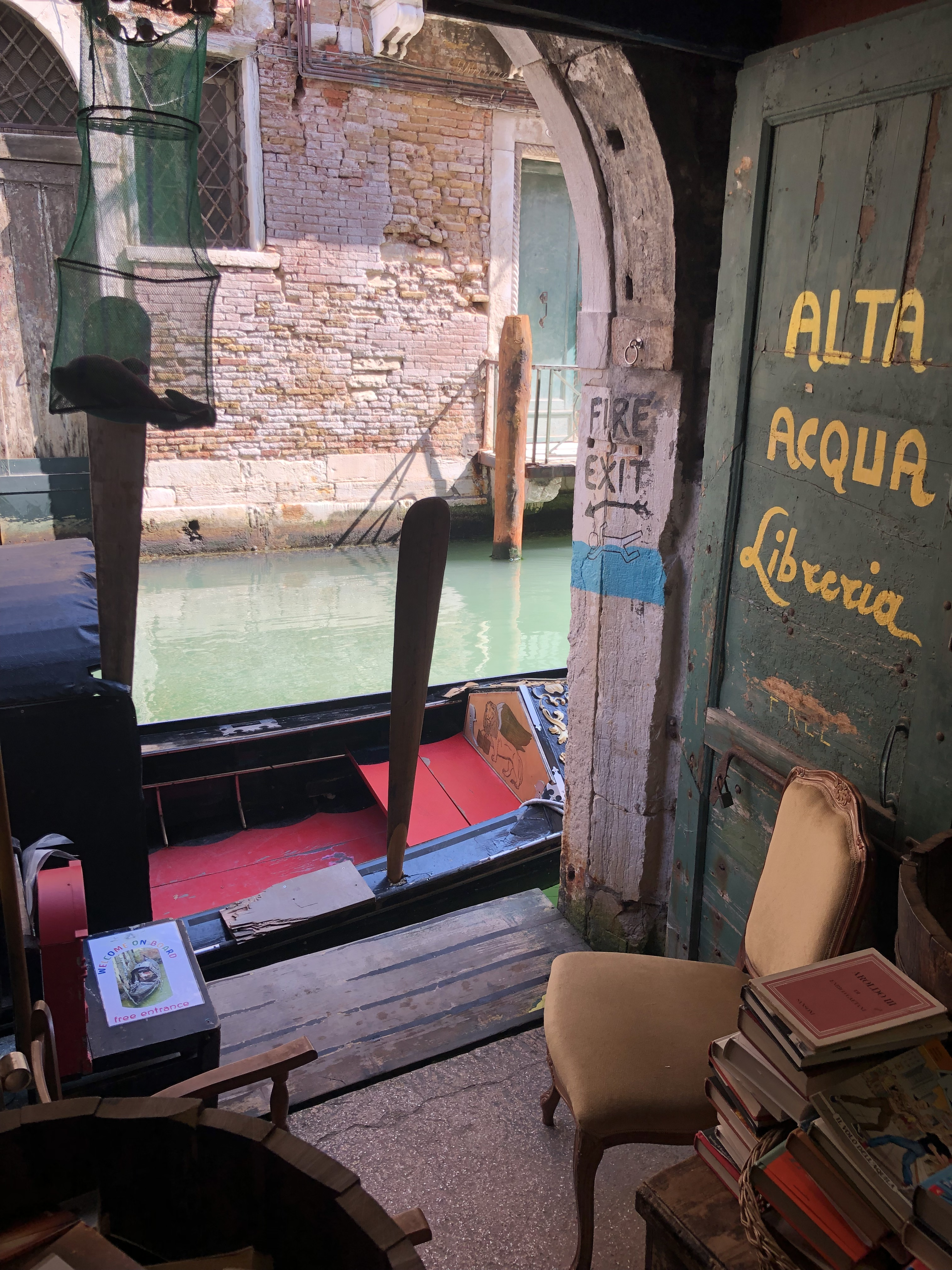
The fire exit towards the back of Acqua Alta, allows visitors to stand toe-to-toe with a canal.

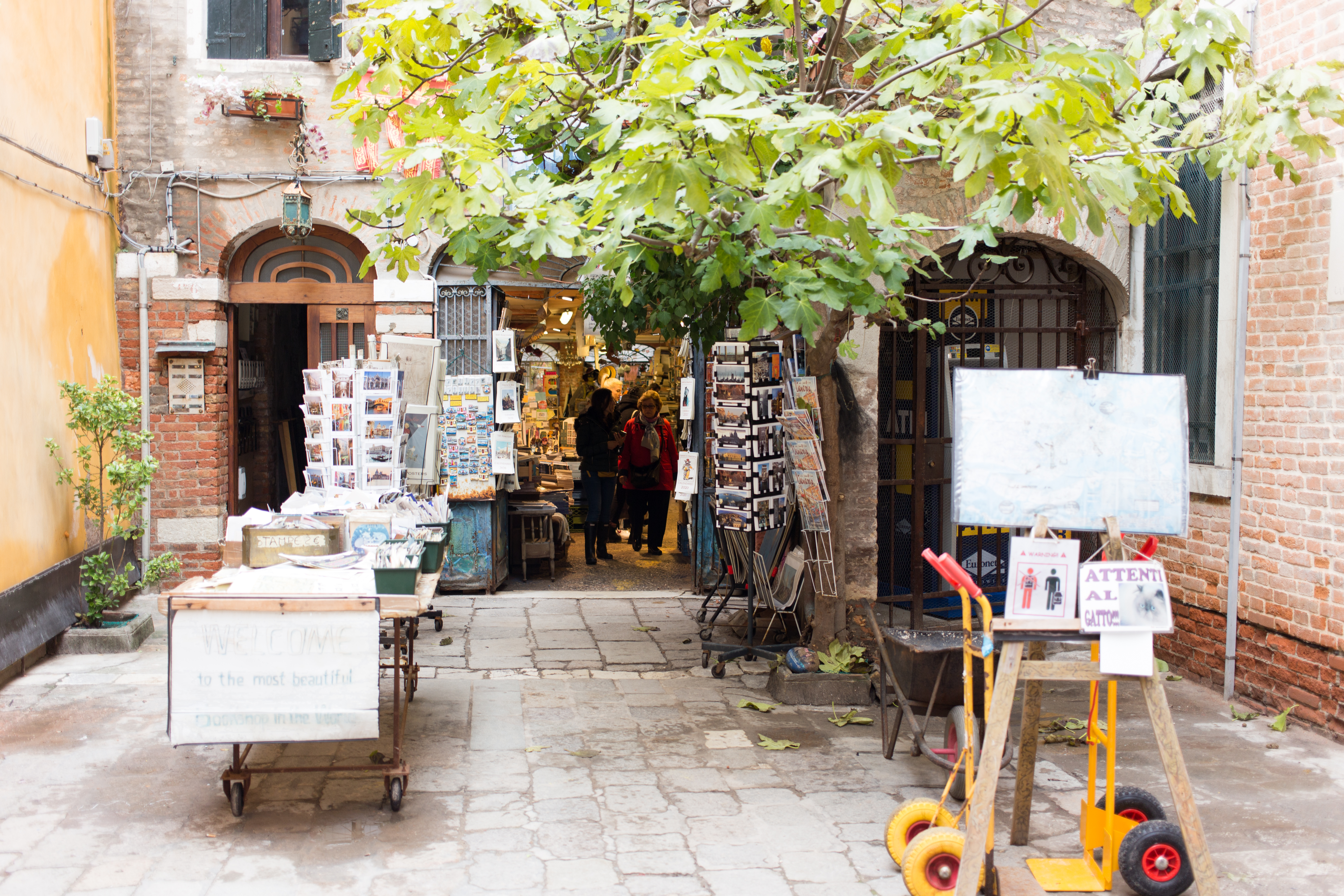
Entrance to Libreria Acqua Alta

Libreria Acqua Alta has been self-proclaimed as "the most beautiful bookshop in the world". In addition, visitors not only have the opportunity to see Coco, the bookstore's resident cat, but a small colony of cats whom decided to spontaneously inhabit the bookstore.

== History ==
Prior to leasing the property, owner Luigi Frizzo was told the property may be located in a flood zone due to its proximity to the water and because of the rising sea levels in Venice. As a result of the rising sea levels, Frizzo decided to name the bookstore Acqua Alta (English: High Tide).

To protect 400,000 books, including first editions, Frizzo implemented a flood-proof infrastructure plan. This consisted of storing hundreds of books in objects such as bathtubs and gondolas, a long Venetian rowing boat that has been utilized within Venice's narrow canals since the 11th century.

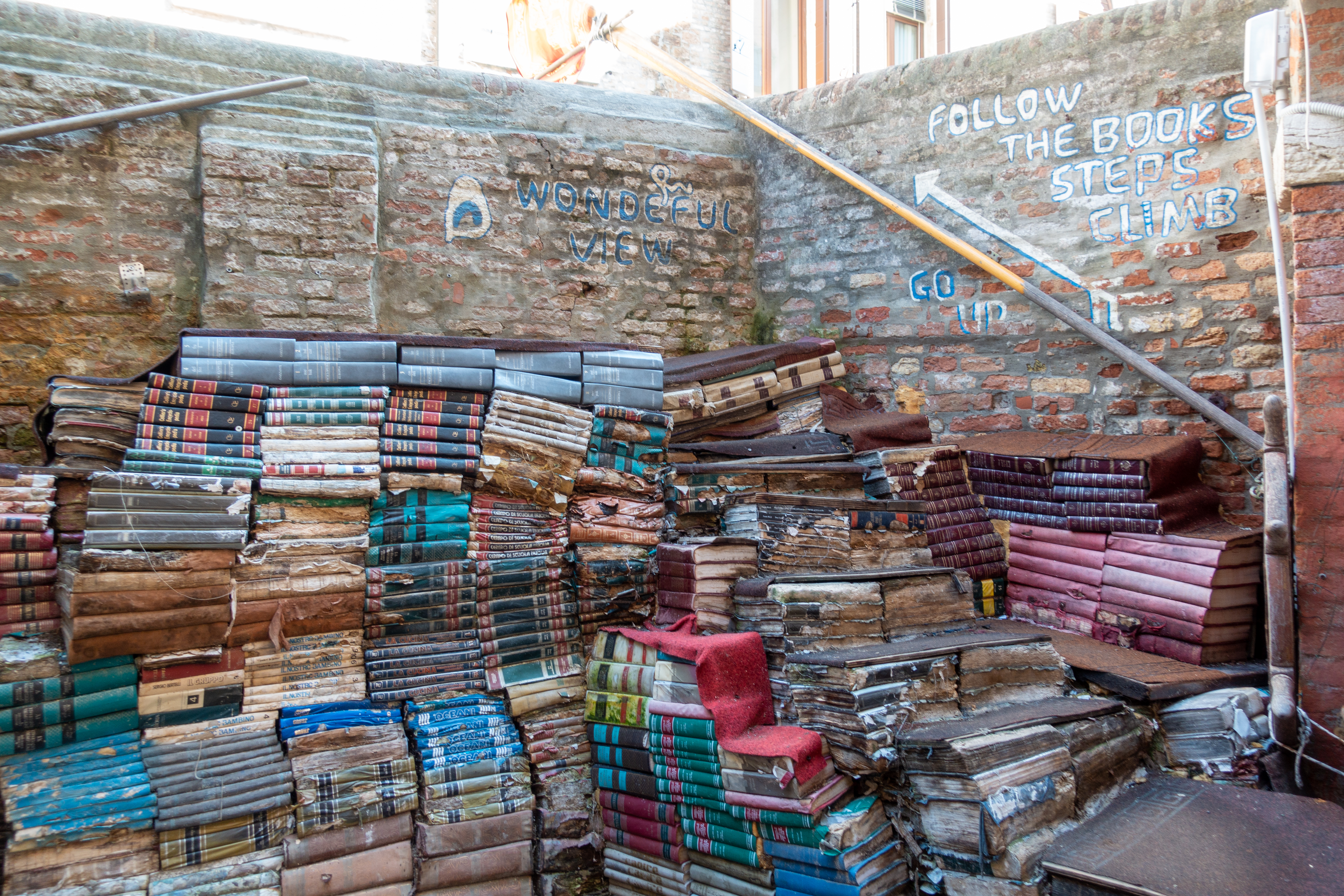
Acqua Alta's staircase has become one of Venice's widely photographed areas.

In addition, this bookstore is home to a staircase made entirely of books, one of Venice's most photographed locations. According to Frizzo, "The staircase was created to store encyclopedias. I had already papered the courtyard where two walled-up windows could not be reopened and I started to move the encyclopedias into the garden, where I then began what would later become the staircase. I would never have imagined that what I considered a simple practical solution would have had so much success".

== 2019 flooding ==
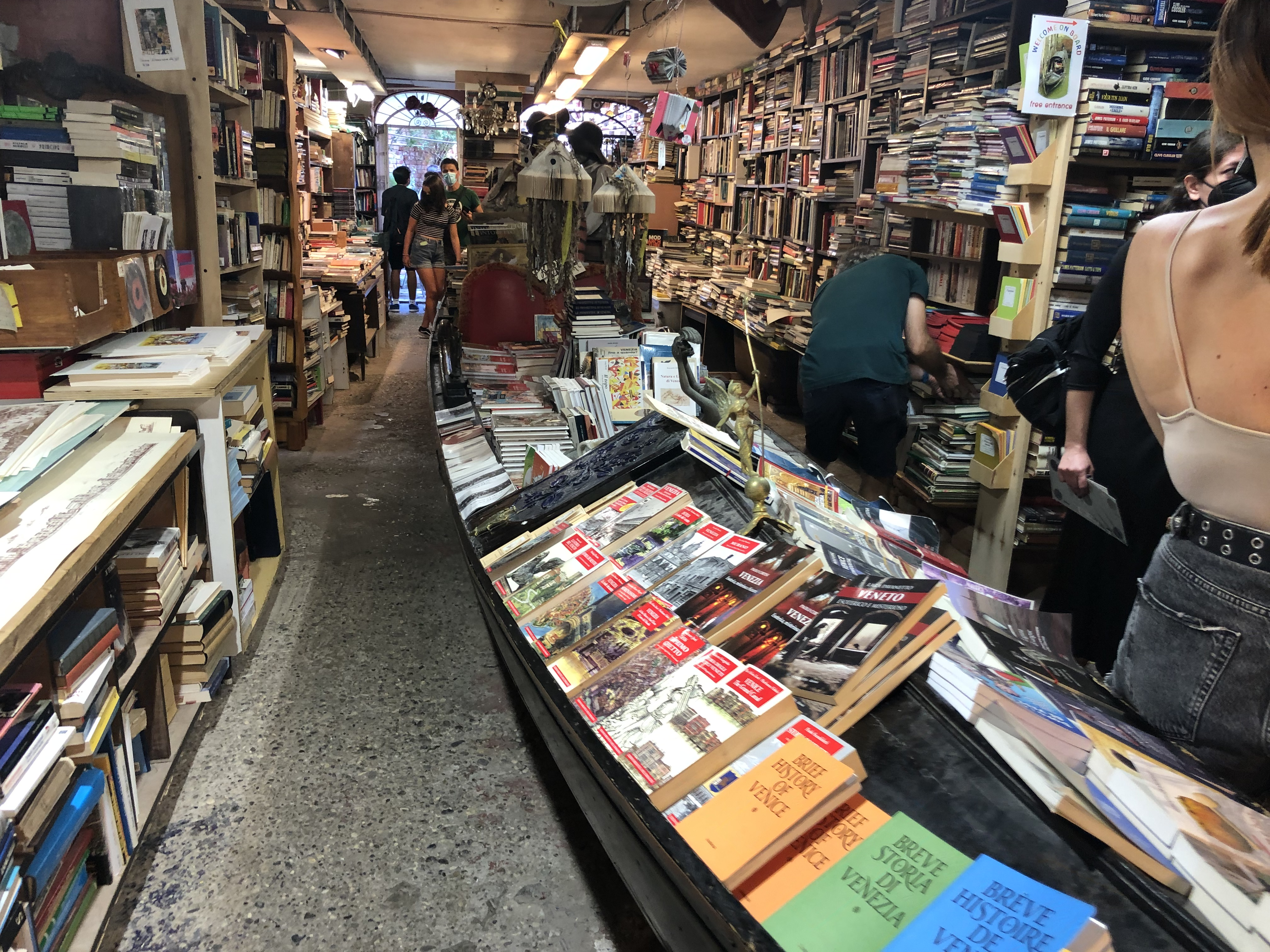
Due to Venice's rising sea levels, Frizzo utilized gondolas to preserve Acqua Alta's books.

In November 2019, Venice was impacted with floods, affecting Acqua Alta. The bookstore suffered extensive damage with the destruction of 10,000 to 100,000 books, due to water levels reaching 1.87 meters (6 feet).

== Popular culture ==
In the past years, Acqua Alta has received more popularity on social media platforms such as TikTok and Instagram, through influencers creating videos based on their experience at the Venetian bookstore .

Due to its growing popularity, supervisor Diana Zanda mentions groups of 10 or more individuals must call in advance prior to visiting bookstore. In addition, bookstore employees must now advise visitors of their limited time to take photos with the book staircase, as the bookstore welcomes anywhere from 2,000 to 5,000 visitors daily.
