= The Sinister Omen =

1982 novel by Carolyn Keene

- Author: Carolyn Keene
- Cover artist: Ruth Sanderson
- Language: English
- Series: Nancy Drew stories
- Genre: Detective, mystery novel
- Published: 1982 Wanderer Books
- Publication place: United States
- Media type: Print (hardback & paperback)
- Preceded by: Race Against Time (Nancy Drew)
- Followed by: The Elusive Heiress

The Sinister Omen is the 67th novel in the Nancy Drew mystery series by Carolyn Keene. It was originally published by Wanderer Books, an imprint of Simon & Schuster, in 1982, with reprints by Pocket Books.

== Plot summary ==
In The Sinister Omen, Nancy Drew is visiting Fort Lauderdale over spring break. Eleanor Palmer, a wealthy old lady (and friend of the Drew family) asks for Nancy's help. Burglars are breaking into her home- but nothing is being stolen.

Nancy investigates, and discovers a sinister Brotherhood of the Vulture. The Brotherhood is trying to find love letters written by Mrs. Palmer's grandparents. They want to steal the rare stamps on those letters and counterfeit those stamps.

Nancy helps Mrs. Palmer find the letters and foil the Brotherhood's plan.

== International editions ==
The Sinister Omen was published internationally by:

- Armada Books in the United Kingdom
- Fargoes in Malaysia
- Forlagshuset Vigmostad & Bjørke in Norway
- Hachette Books in France
- Tammi (company) in Finland
- Wahlström & Widstrand in Sweden
