= Clue in the Ancient Disguise =

1982 novel by Carolyn Keene

- Author: Carolyn Keene
- Cover artist: Ruth Sanderson
- Language: English
- Series: Nancy Drew stories
- Genre: Detective, mystery novel
- Published: 1982 Wanderer Books
- Publication place: United States
- Media type: Print (hardback & paperback)
- Preceded by: The Elusive Heiress
- Followed by: The Broken Anchor

Clue in the Ancient Disguise is the 69th novel in the Nancy Drew mystery series by Carolyn Keene. It was originally published by Wanderer Books, an imprint of Simon & Schuster, in 1982.

== Plot summary ==
Nancy's father Carson asks her to help one of his legal clients- an inventor named Pierre Michaud who found a mysterious letter in his deceased father's effects. The letter is from a woman named Louise Duval, who hints that they share a mysterious common ancestor. Pierre attempted to contact Louise, but she recently passed away; he's been talking to the beneficiary of her will, Lisa Thorpe.

Pierre's workshop catches fire. Nancy and Pierre rescue his assistant from the burning building, and find a mysterious warning spray-painted on one of the workshop walls.

Nancy meets up with Lisa, who tells her that the 'mysterious ancestor' is probably her ancestor Yvette who emigrated to America 200 years ago.
