= Race Against Time (Nancy Drew) =

1982 novel by Carolyn Keene

- First edition
- Author: Carolyn Keene
- Cover artist: Ruth Sanderson
- Language: English
- Series: Nancy Drew stories
- Genre: Detective, mystery novel
- Published: 1982 Wanderer Books
- Publication place: United States
- Media type: Print (hardback & paperback)
- Preceded by: Mystery of the Winged Lion
- Followed by: The Sinister Omen

Race Against Time is the 66th novel in the Nancy Drew mystery series by Carolyn Keene. It was published by Wanderer Books, an imprint of Simon & Schuster in 1982. It has 20 chapters and over 200 pages.

== Plot summary ==
In Race Against Time, Nancy Drew is a "movie star." Ned's college film club is making a spooky vampire movie set in an old deserted mansion — and Nancy is the star! The popular detective has also been asked to model in a series of TV commercials for a new beauty product.

As if that were not enough to keep Nancy busy, she has a couple of cases to solve. A valuable racehorse has been stolen from a nearby farm. It is up to Nancy to figure out which of its owner's many enemies may have taken the prize thoroughbred. There's also another mystery around. Someone keeps disturbing the film club as they are shooting their film. When a building goes up in flames, it is time to take the disruption seriously!

Nancy faces two deadlines: Returning the missing horse before its race and helping Ned and his friends finish their horror film before everything is runied.

== References and sources ==
- The Nancy Drew Files at The Hardy Boys and Nancy Drew Archive
- Knowing Nancy Drew at Mysterynet.com
