= Rowing =

Act of propelling a boat using oars

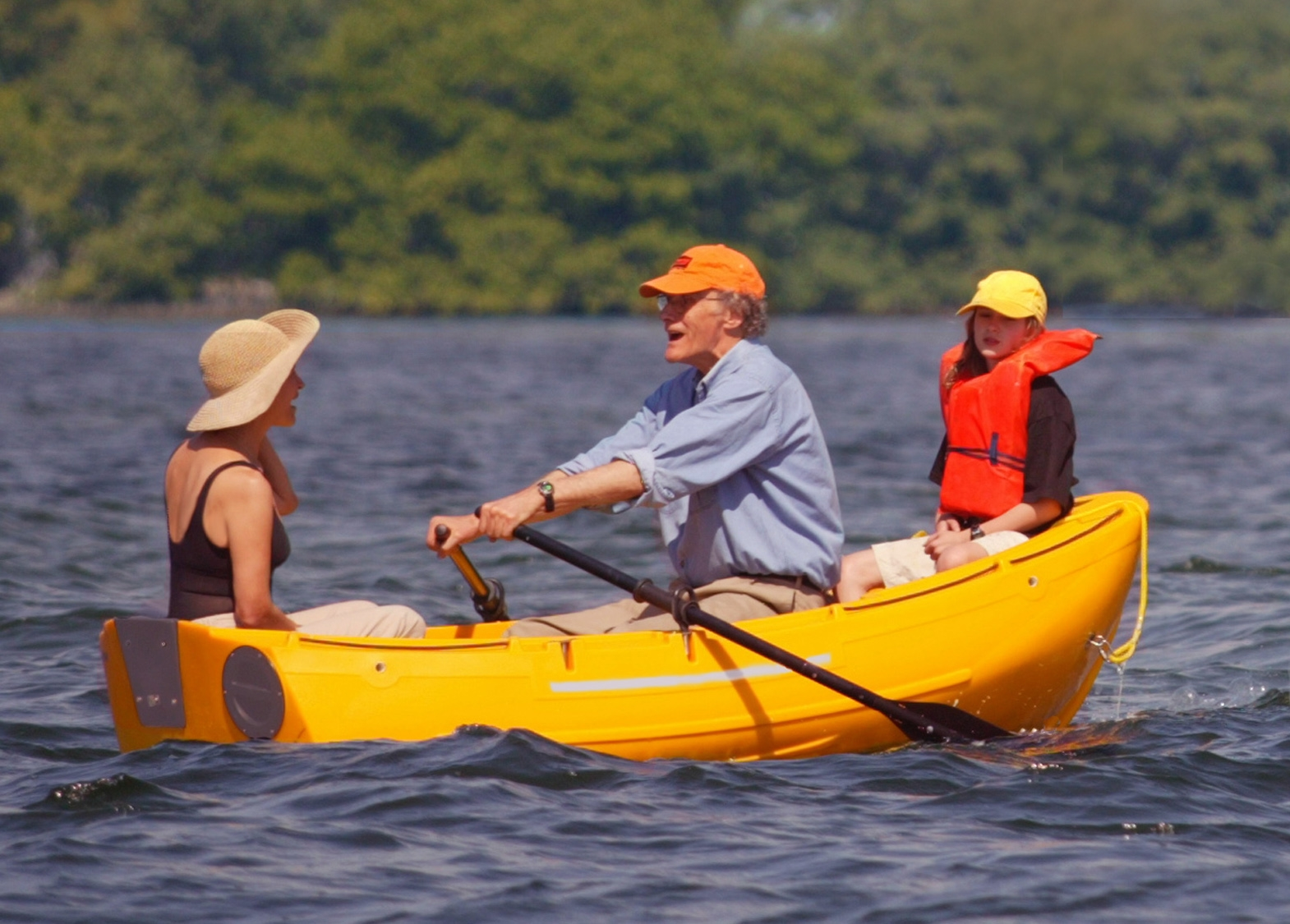
A rowing dinghy in use

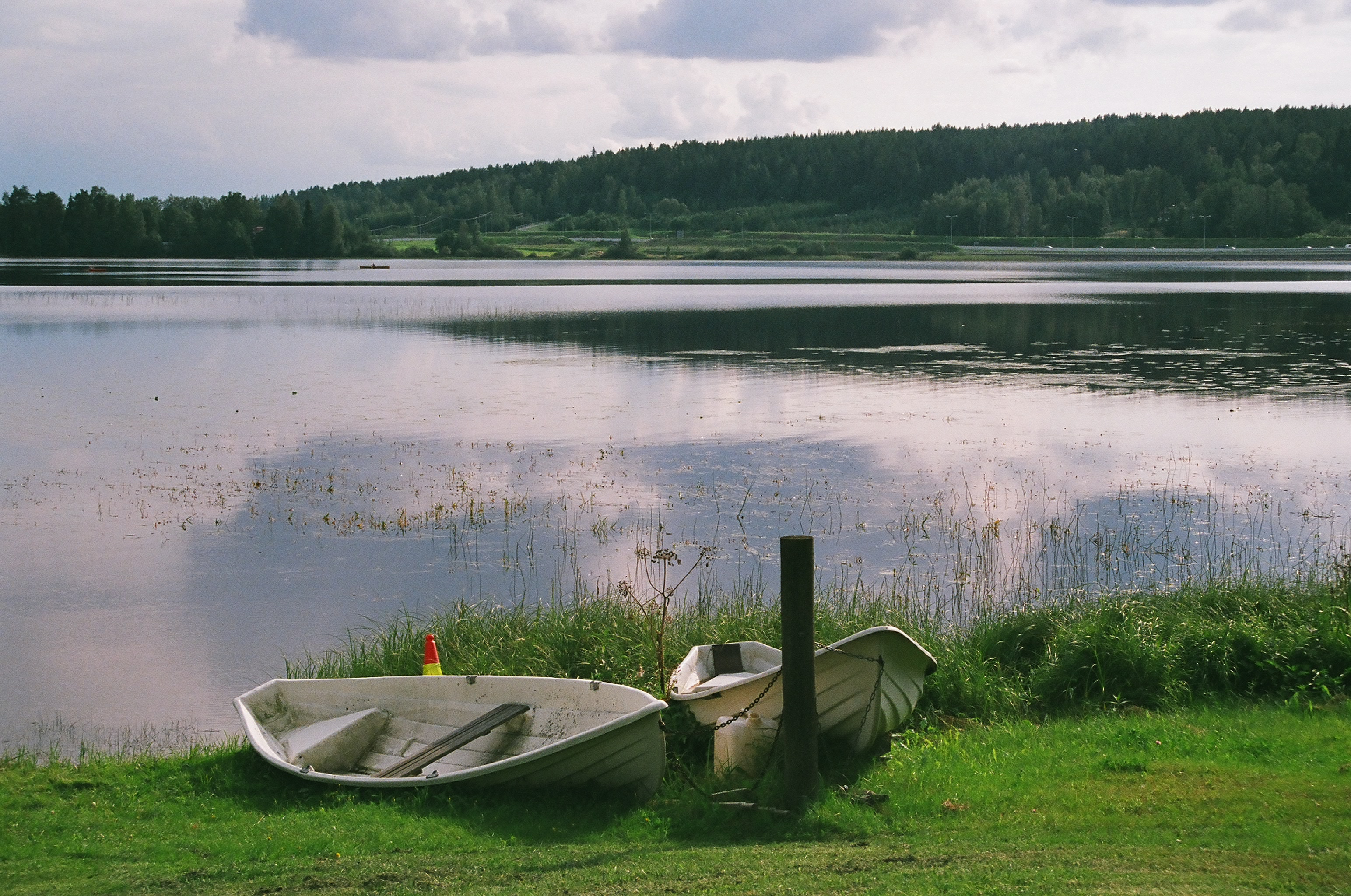
Typical Finnish rowing boats on the shore of Palokkajärvi, Jyväskylä

A rowing boat in Japan

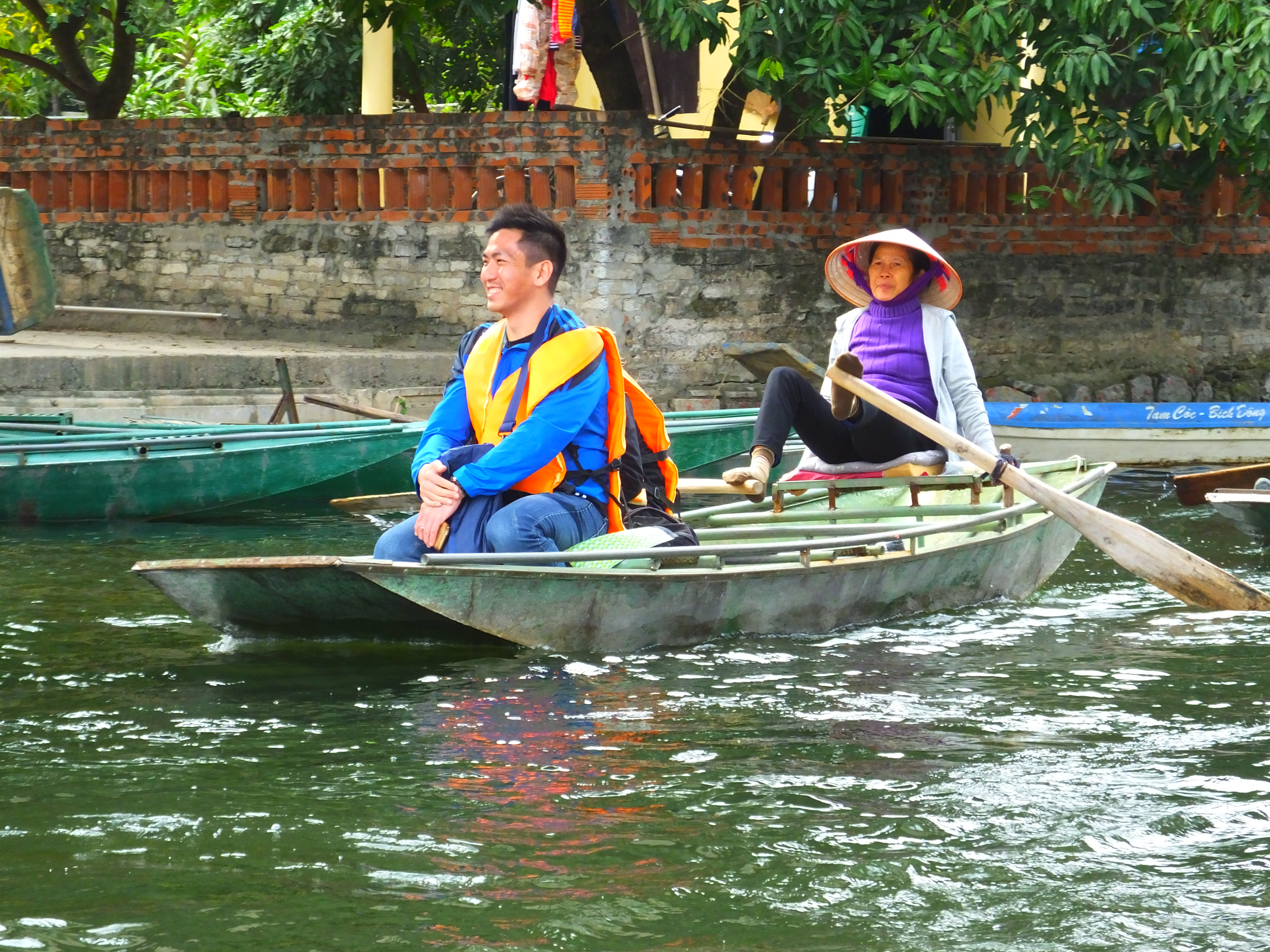
Woman rowing sampan with her feet in Ninh Bình Province of northern Vietnam

Rowing is the act of propelling a human-powered watercraft using the sweeping motions of oars to displace water and generate reactional propulsion. Rowing is functionally similar to paddling, but rowing requires oars to be mechanically attached to the boat, and the rower drives the oar like a lever, exerting force in the same direction as the boat's travel; while paddles are completely hand-held and have no attachment to the boat, exerting force opposite to the intended direction of the boat.

In some strict terminologies, using oars for propulsion may be termed either "pulling" or "rowing," with different definitions for each. Where these strict terminologies are used, the definitions are reversed depending on the context. On saltwater a "pulling boat" has each person working one oar on one side, in either a single banked or double banked arrangement; whilst "rowing" means each person operates two oars, one on each side of the boat. On inland waterways, the opposite applies, with "rowing" being where each person in a crew works one oar and "sculling" (especially in sport rowing) involves each participant using a pair of oars. In a maritime setting "sculling" means propelling a boat with a single oar operated over the stern.

This article focuses on the general types of rowing, such as recreation and transport rather than the sport of competitive rowing, which is a specialized case of boat racing using strictly regulated equipment and a highly refined technique.

== History of rowing ==
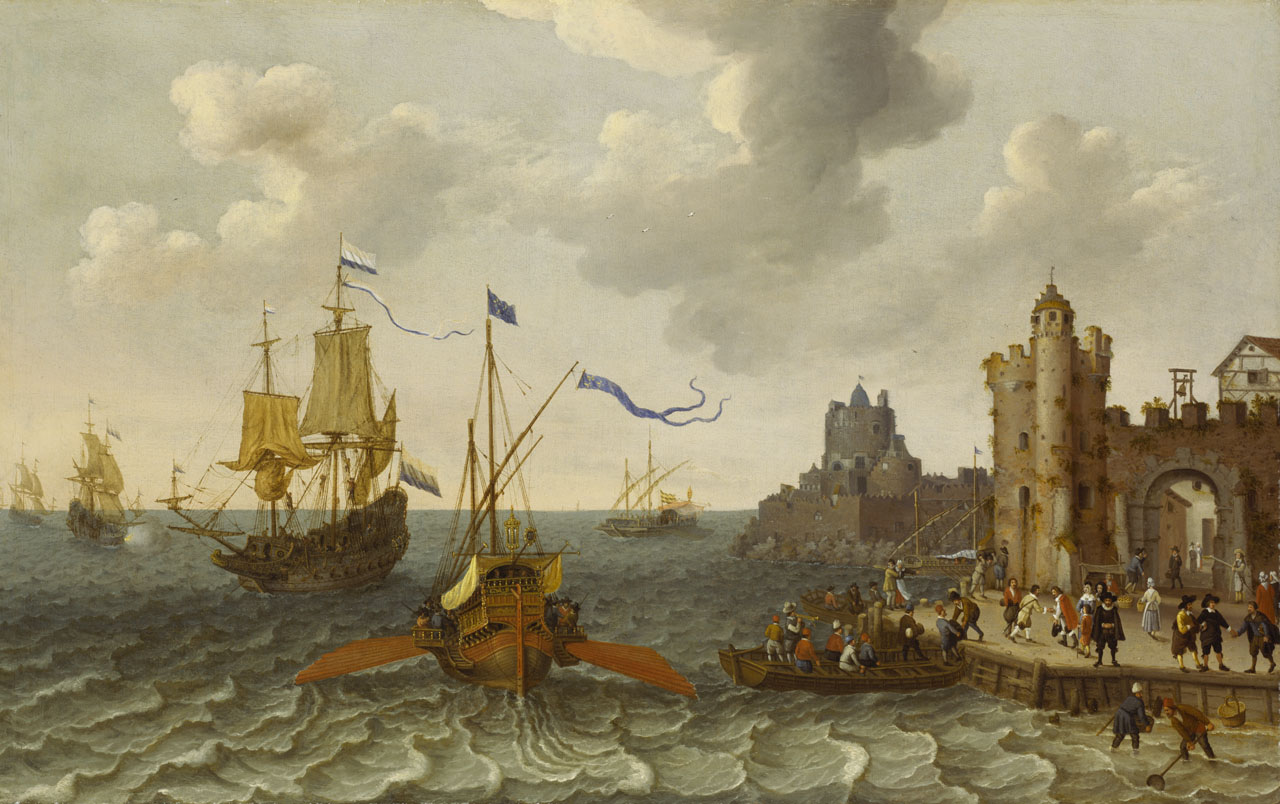
A French galley and Dutch man-of-war off a port

=== Ancient Egypt ===
The beginning of rowing is clouded in history but the use of oars in the way they are used today can be traced back to ancient Egypt. Whether it was invented in Egypt or something learned from Mesopotamia via trade is not known. However, archaeologists have recovered a model of a rowing vessel in a tomb dating back to the 18-19th century BC. The model they found was of a wide boat with shallow bottom, rather like a barge, which was designed to float on the shallow rivers of Mesopotamia. Both the Euphrates and the Tigris rivers were part of this region and flowing from the north to the south they quickly became an integral part of the non-nomadic civilizations.

Rowing vessels, especially galleys, were extensively used in naval warfare and trade in the Mediterranean from classical antiquity onward. Galleys had advantages over sailing ships in light seas with low winds: they were easier to maneuver, capable of short bursts of speed, and able to move independently of the wind.

=== Ancient Greece ===
During the classical age of oared galleys, the Greeks dominated the Mediterranean while the Athenians dominated the other Greeks. They used thousands of lower-class citizens to serve as rowers in the fleet. In Classical Athens, a leading naval power at the time, rowing was regarded as an honorable profession of which men should possess some practical knowledge.

The Classical trireme used 170 rowers; later galleys included even larger crews. Trireme oarsmen used leather cushions to slide over their seats, which allowed them to use their leg strength as a modern oarsman does with a sliding seat. Galleys usually had masts and sails, but would lower them at the approach of combat. Greek fleets would even leave their sails and masts on shore (as being unnecessary weight) if possible.

=== Northern Europe ===
The use of oars in rowing instead of paddling came rather late to northern Europe, sometime between 500 BC-1 AD. This change might have been hastened by the Roman conquest of Northern Gaul. However, between 500 and 1100 AD, combined sailing and rowing vessels dominated trade and warfare in northern Europe in the time that has come to be known as the Viking Age.

Galleys continued to be used in the Mediterranean until the advent of steam propulsion.

== Types of rowing systems ==
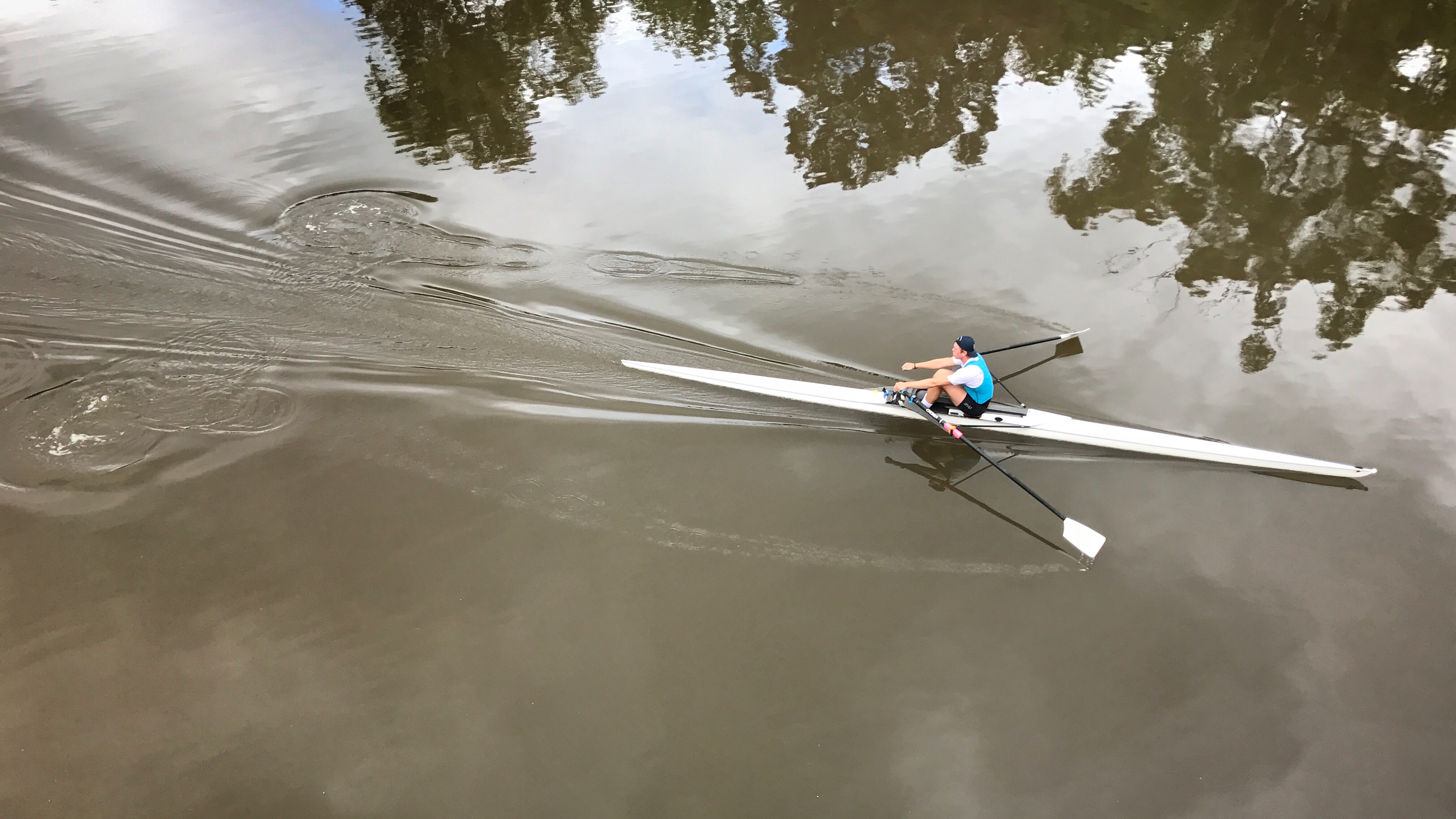
Rearward-facing rowing system

In some localities, rear-facing systems prevail. In other localities, forward-facing systems prevail, especially in crowded areas such as in Venice, Italy and in Asian and Indonesian rivers and harbors. This is not strictly an "either-or", because in different situations it's useful to be able to row a boat facing either way. The current emphasis on the health aspects of rowing has resulted in some new mechanical systems being developed, some (such as the Rantilla rowing method) very different from the traditional rowing systems of the past.

=== Rearward-facing systems ===
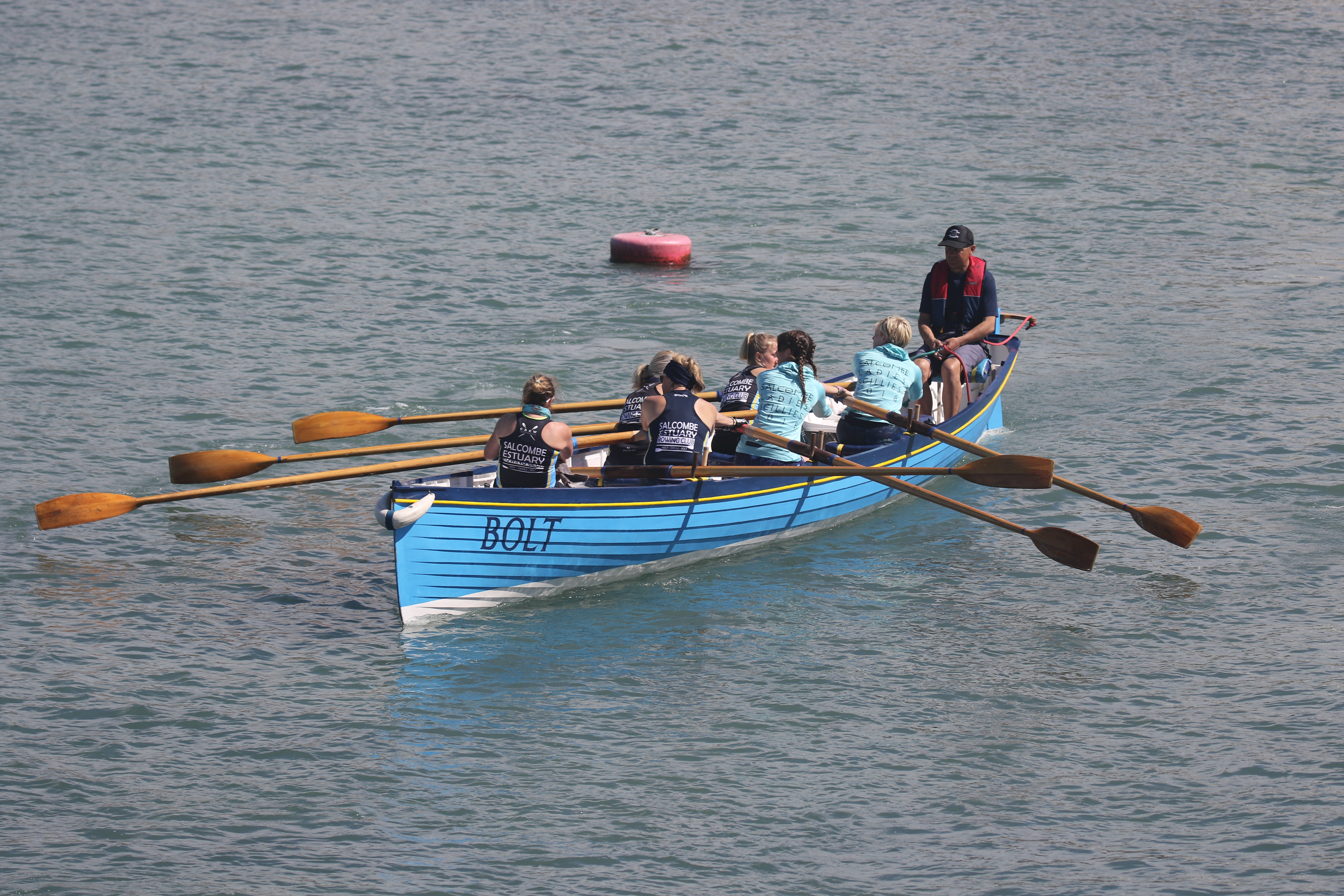
A Cornish pilot gig, a single banked boat

A seated rower pulls on one or two oars, which lever the boat through the water. The pivot point of the oars (attached solidly to the boat) is the fulcrum for this lever. The person operating the oar is kept in position (when applying maximum force) by a stretcher, a footrest that may be as simple as a wooden bar that can be adjusted by positioning in different pairs of notches in the bottom of the boat.

Different types of pivot points can be used as a fulcrum for the oar.

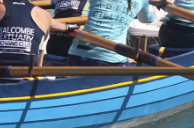
Thole pins in a close up from the picture above

- Thole pins are wooden pegs that are inserted into holes in the top of the gunwale. They are often used in pairs, with the oar resting between them. If used singly, the oar bears against the thole pin on the power stroke and is held in place by a leather strop for the return stroke.
- Oar crutches – commonly called "rowlocks" (see below for the strict definition) are metal fittings, usually U-shaped, with a pin underneath that fits into a metal socket on the gunwale. The oar sits in the U-shaped portion and the oar crutch pivots in the socket whilst in use.
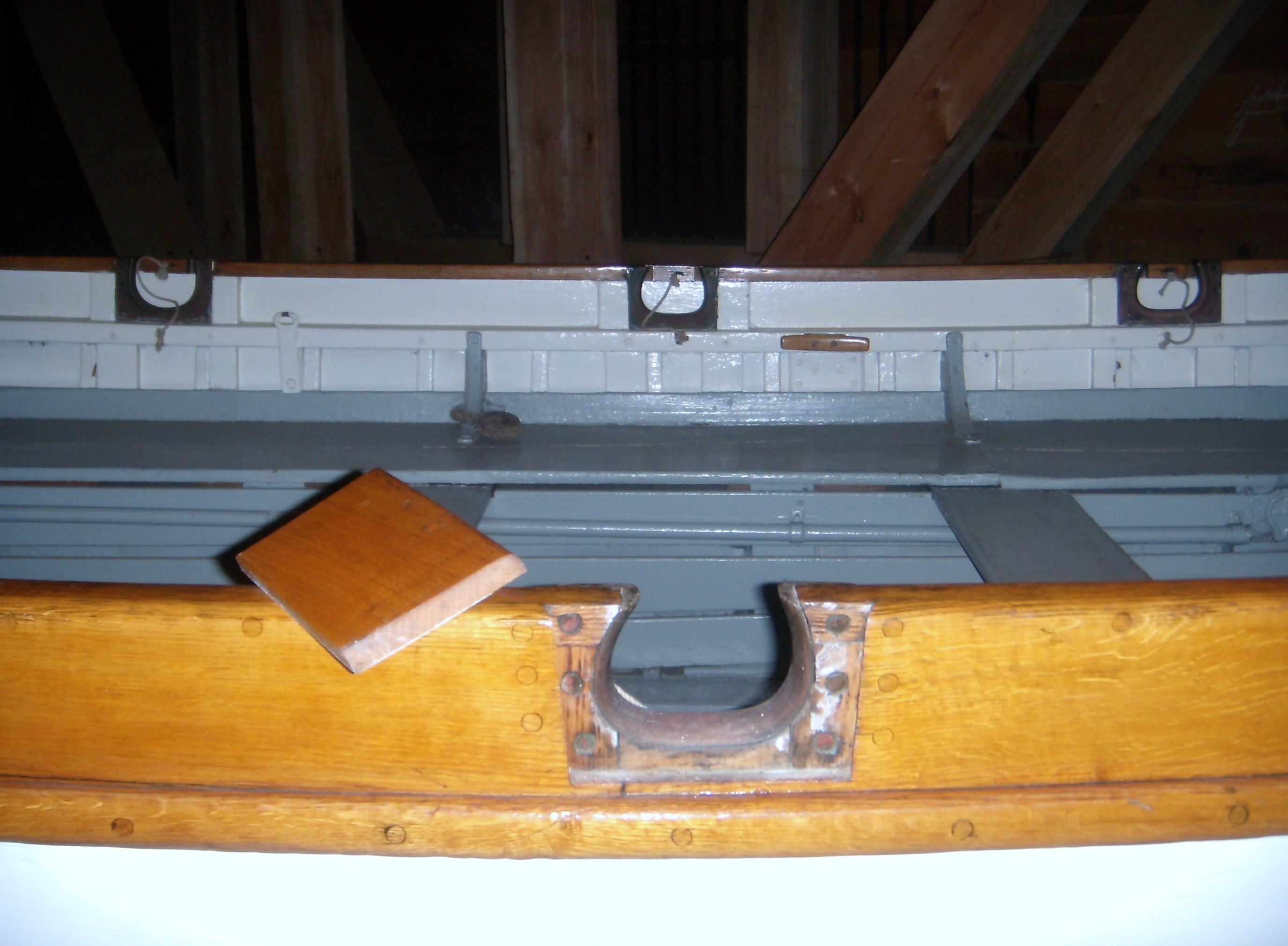
  A rowlock cut into the washstrake
- A rowlock or oarlock is, in strict terminology, a U-shaped cut-out in the top-most strake of the boat's hull – this cut-out is usually in a wash-strake, a strake that sits above the gunwale. (The term rowlock is often applied to an oar crutch.) A rowlock may be closed when, for instance, a boat is being used under sail. Strictly speaking, this is done with a piece called a shutter, which is habitually mistermed a "poppett".
- An oarport is a hole cut through the side of the hull. The oar has to be passed through this hole when it is needed. A slot may be cut in one part of the hole to allow the blade of the oar to get through (as seen in the Gokstad ship).

The traditional terminology, in a strict application, varies between boats operating on salt water and in fresh water. "Rowing" at sea denotes each rower operating a pair of oars, one on each side of the boat. When each person uses a single oar on one side of the boat, that action is termed "pulling". In fresh water terminology, "rowing" is the use of one oar per person, whilst "pulling" denotes each person using two oars.

Traditional boats propelled by oar are fitted with thwarts - seats that go from one side of the hull to the other, as well as forming part of the hull structure. A boat that is "double banked" has two crew members sitting on each thwart, each pulling an oar on their side of the boat. In a "single banked" boat, there is one person on each thwart pulling one oar. Though there is usually an even number of oars used in single banked boats (alternating port and starboard along the length of the boat) a common exception is the arrangement in many whaleboats, where five oars were often used, three on one side and two on the other.

=== Forward-facing systems ===
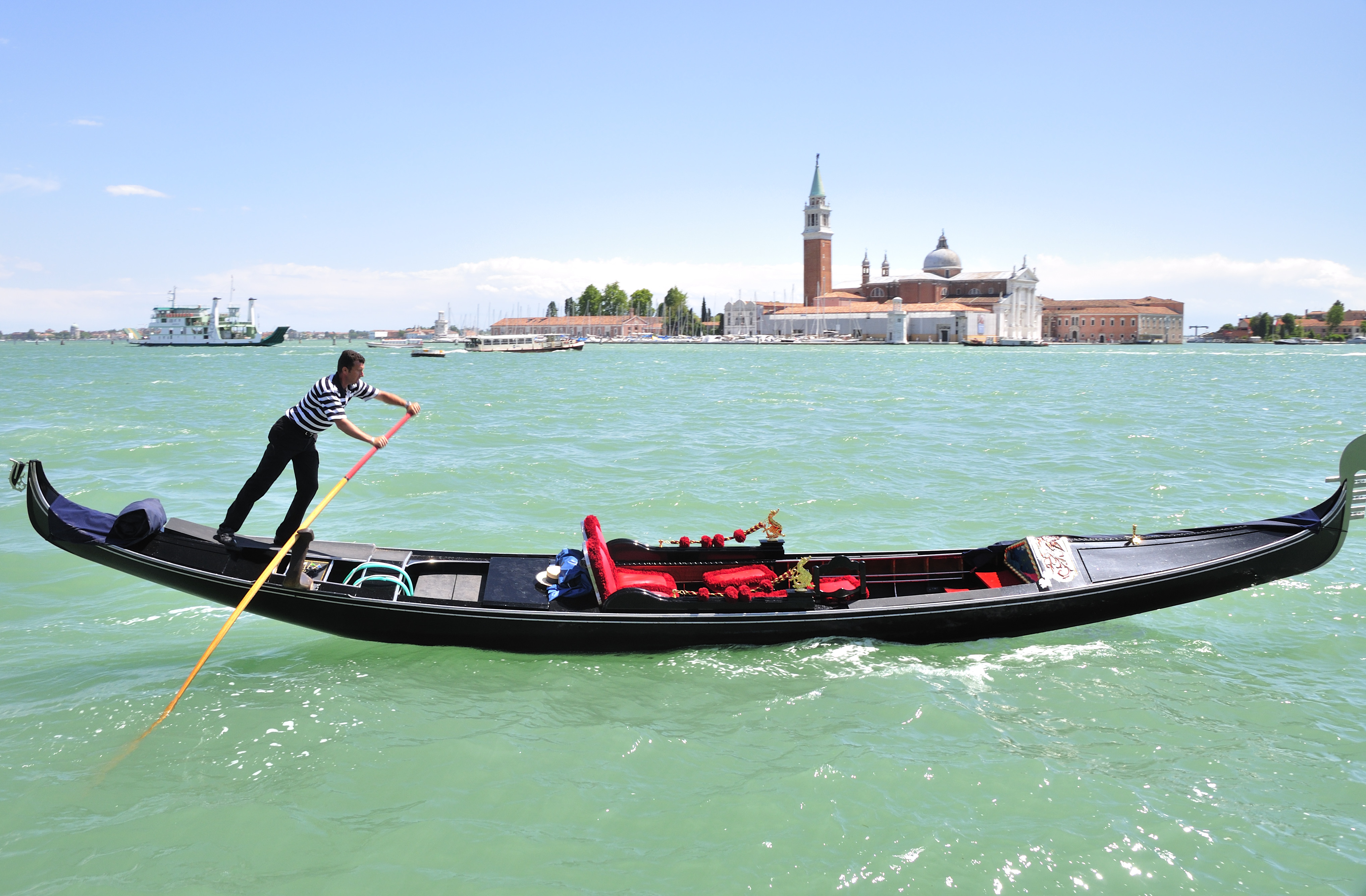
A gondola in Venice, Italy propelled with the typical voga alla veneta

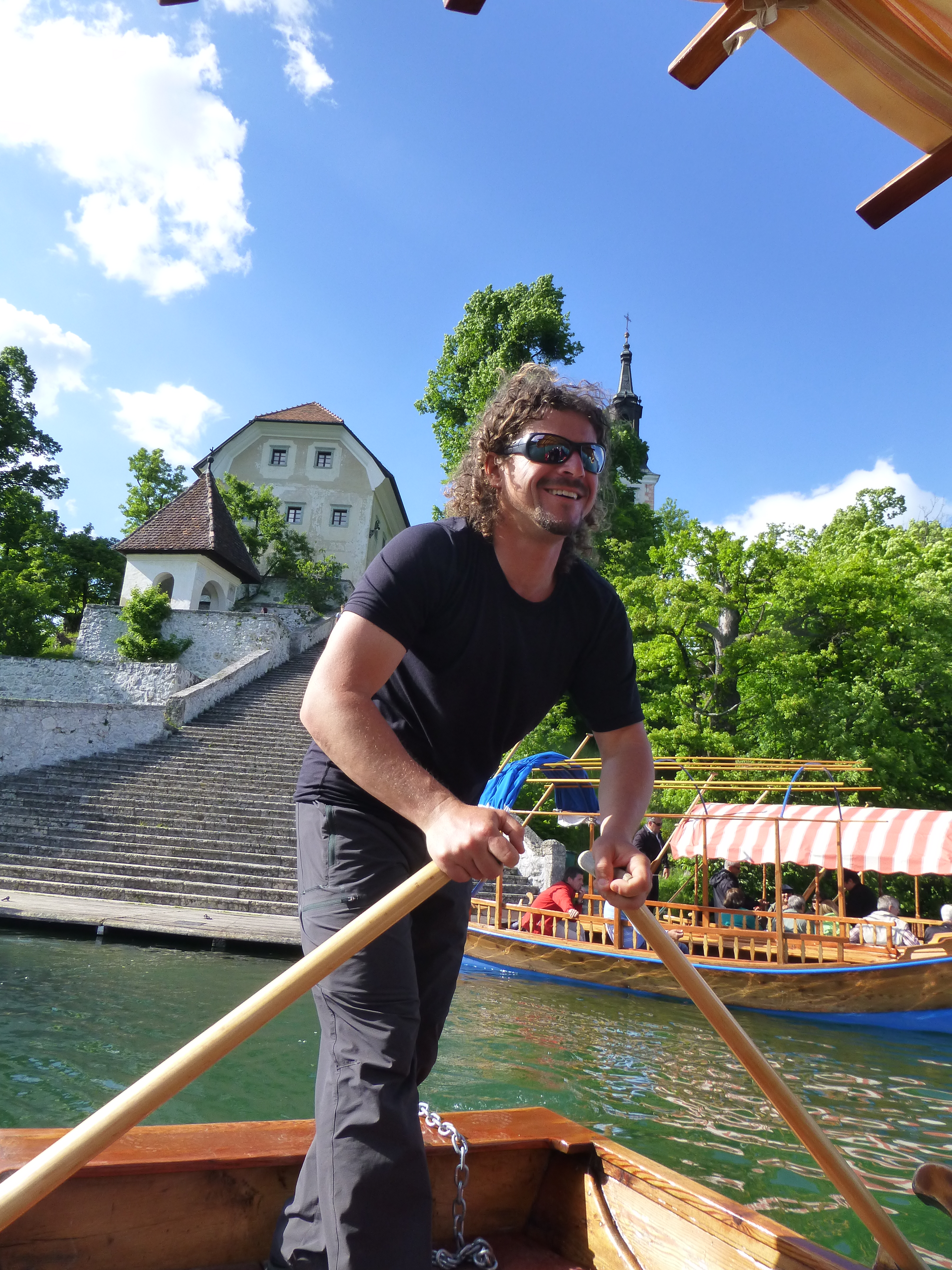
A forward-facing rowing technique used in the Slovenian pletna

Push rowing, also called back-watering if used in a boat not designed for forward motion, uses regular oars with a pushing motion to achieve forward-facing travel, sometimes seated and sometimes standing. This is a convenient method of manoeuvring in a narrow waterway or through a busy harbour.

The Venetian rowing (voga alla veneta) is the traditional technique in Venice, Italy in which the rower stands up, facing forward and resting a single oar in a special oarlock called fórcola.

The pletna of Slovenia is rowed forward in the standing position with two oars.

Another system (also called sculling) involves using a single oar extending from the stern of the boat which is moved side to side underwater somewhat like a fish tail, such as the Chinese yuloh, by which quite large boats can be moved.

Sampans are rowed by foot in Ninh Bình Province of northern Vietnam.

The Intha people of Burma row forwards using their legs.

The "Rantilla" system of frontrowing oars uses inboard mounted oarlocks and a reversing transmission to achieve forward motion of the boat with a pulling motion on the oars.

== Rowing propulsion ==
Rowing is a cyclic (or intermittent) form of propulsion such that in the quasi-steady state the motion of the system (the system comprising the rower, the oars, and the boat), is repeated regularly. In order to maintain the steady-state propulsion of the system without either accelerating or decelerating the system, the sum of all the external forces on the system, averaged over the cycle, must be zero. Thus, the average drag (retarding) force on the system must equal the average propulsion force on the system. The drag forces consist of aerodynamic drag on the superstructure of the system (components of the boat situated above the waterline), as well as the hydrodynamic drag on the submerged portion of the system. The propulsion forces are the forward reaction of the water on the oars while in the water. The oar can be used to provide a drag force (a force acting against the forward motion) when the system is brought to rest.

Although the oar can be conveniently thought of as a lever with a "fixed" pivot point in the water, the blade moves sideways and sternwards through the water, so that the magnitude of the propulsion force developed is the result of a complex interaction between unsteady fluid mechanics (the water flow around the blade) and solid mechanics and dynamics (the handle force applied to the oar, the oar's inertia and bending characteristic, the acceleration of the boat and so on).

== Distinction from other watercraft ==
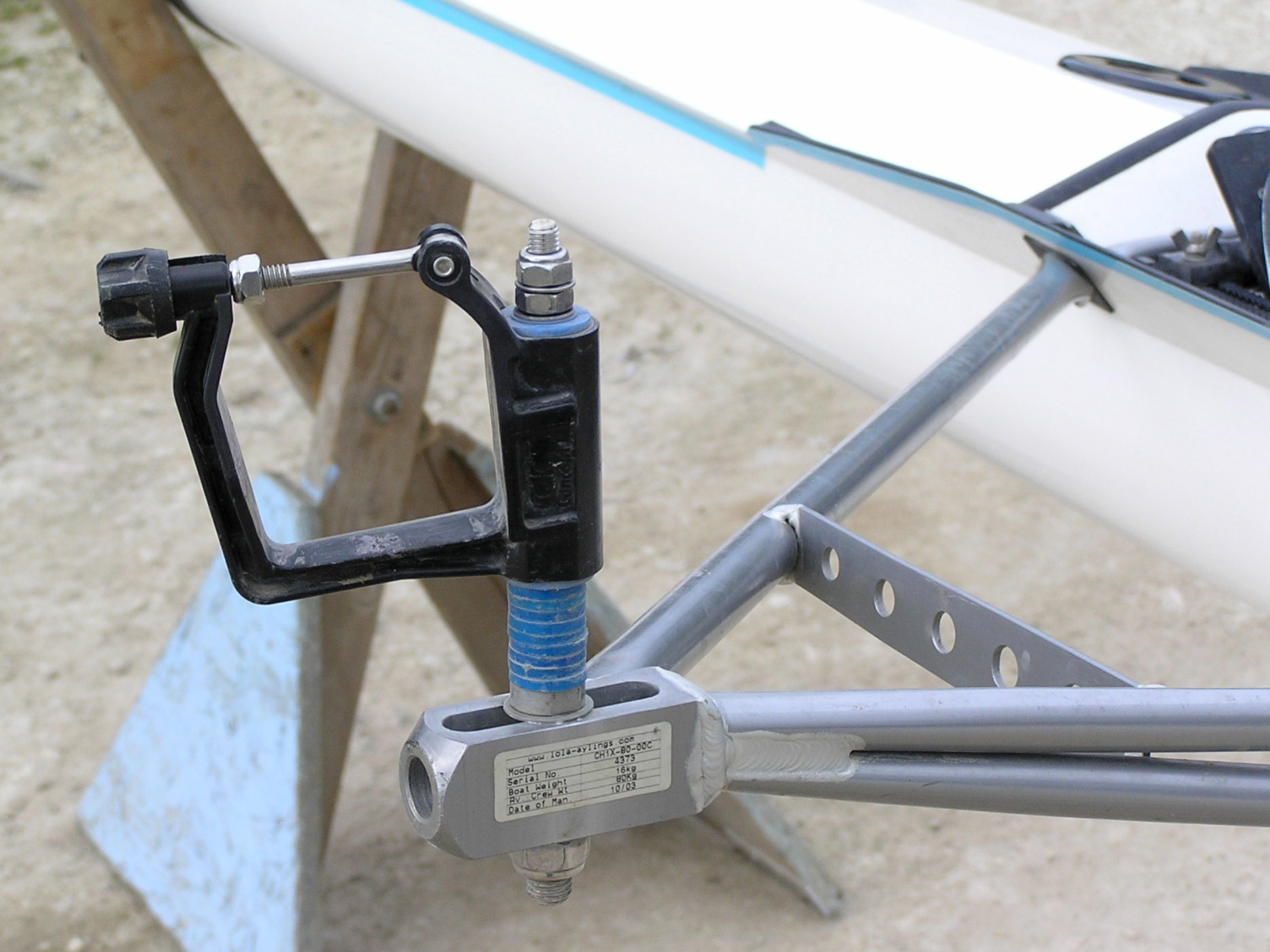
Oars are held in an oarlock at the end of riggers attached to the side of this boat

The distinction between rowing and other forms of water transport, such as canoeing or kayaking, is that in rowing the oars are held in place at a pivot point that is in a fixed position relative to the boat. This point is the load point for the oar to act as a second-class lever (the blade fixed in the water is the fulcrum). In flatwater rowing, the boat (also called a shell or fine boat) is narrow to avoid drag, and the oars are attached to oarlocks (also called gates ) at the end of outriggers extending from the sides of the boat. Racing boats also have sliding seats to allow the use of the legs in addition to the body to apply power to the oar.

== Venetian rowing ==
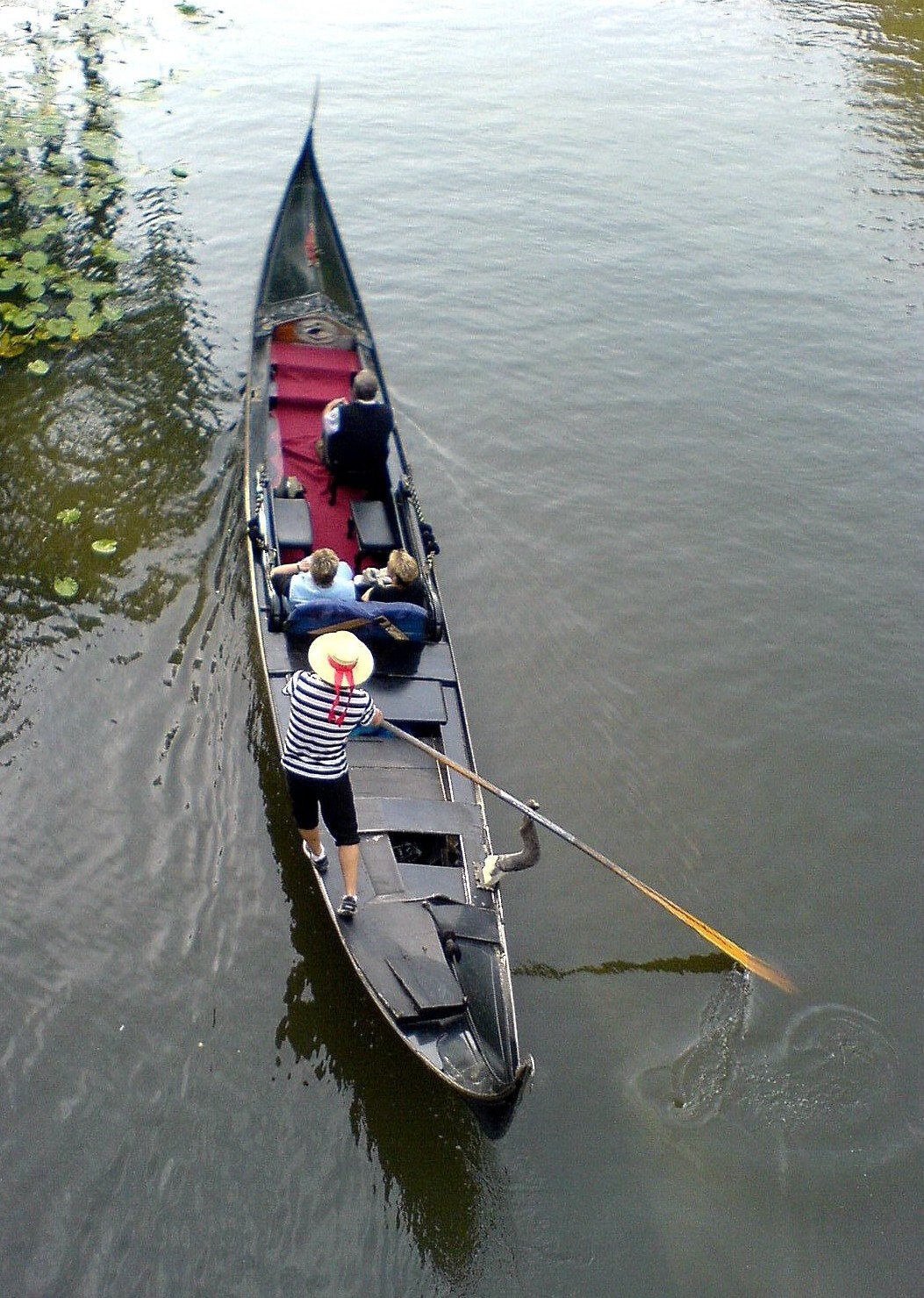
A Gondola in Venice

In Venice, gondolas and other similar flat-bottomed boats are popular forms of transport propelled by oars which are held in place by an open wooden fórcola. The Voga alla Veneta technique of rowing is considerably different from the style used in international sport rowing, due to the oarsman facing forward in a standing position. This allows the boat to maneuver very quickly and with agility - useful in the narrow and busy canals of Venice. Competitive regattas are also held using the Venetian rowing technique by using both gondolas and other types of vessels.

There are three styles of Venetian rowing, each slightly different. The first consists of a single oarsman with one oar, standing near the stern of the boat where the oar also acts as a rudder. The second style consists of one or two oarsmen, each with two crossed oars (known as a la valesàna). The third style has two or more oarsmen, rowing on alternate sides of the boat.

== Design factors ==
The classic shapes of rowing boats reflect an evolution of hundreds of years of trial and error to get a good shape. Some factors to be considered are waterline length, speed, carrying capacity, stability, windage, weight, seaworthiness, cost, waterline beam, the fullness or fineness of the ends, and trim. Design details are a compromise between competing factors.

=== Width and height ===
If the waterline beam (width) is too narrow the boat will be tender and the occupant at risk of falling out, if the beam is too wide the boat will be slow and have more resistance to waves. Overall beam (width) is important. If the rowlocks are too close together the oars will be difficult to use. If the rowlocks are too far apart then the boat will be overly large and rowing will be inefficient, wasting a rower's effort. Sometimes on narrow, faster rowing boats for protected waters outriggers are added to increase rowlock separation.

If the freeboard (height of the gunwale above the waterline) is too high then windage will be high and as a result, the boat will be caught by the wind and the rower will not be able to control the boat in high winds. If the freeboard is too low, water will enter the boat through waves. If the boat is designed for one person then only a single rowing position is required. If the rower is to carry a passenger at the stern than the boat will be stern heavy and trim will be incorrect.

=== Length ===
When it comes to how long the rowing boat should be, it is a compromise between two factors that will affect the speed of the boat. If the boat is too short, the boat will reach a very low maximum speed. If the boat is too long, there will be more friction and more wet surface. Therefore, the minimum recommended length should be around 16 feet. If the boat is longer than that recommended length, the boat is usually narrower and although faster will generally be more difficult to balance.

=== Weight ===
To have good width and the height that ensures the balance of the rowing boat, a weight can be added in the bow, alternatively, the boat can supply a second rowing position further forward for this purpose.

There are some advantages and disadvantages that are attributed to the weight of the rowing boat. A very light boat will most likely start to slow down as soon as the oar stroke has ended. In contrast, a heavier boat will likely continue to move forward.

Most modern style rowing boats are considerably lighter than traditional clinker-built style.

=== Performance ===
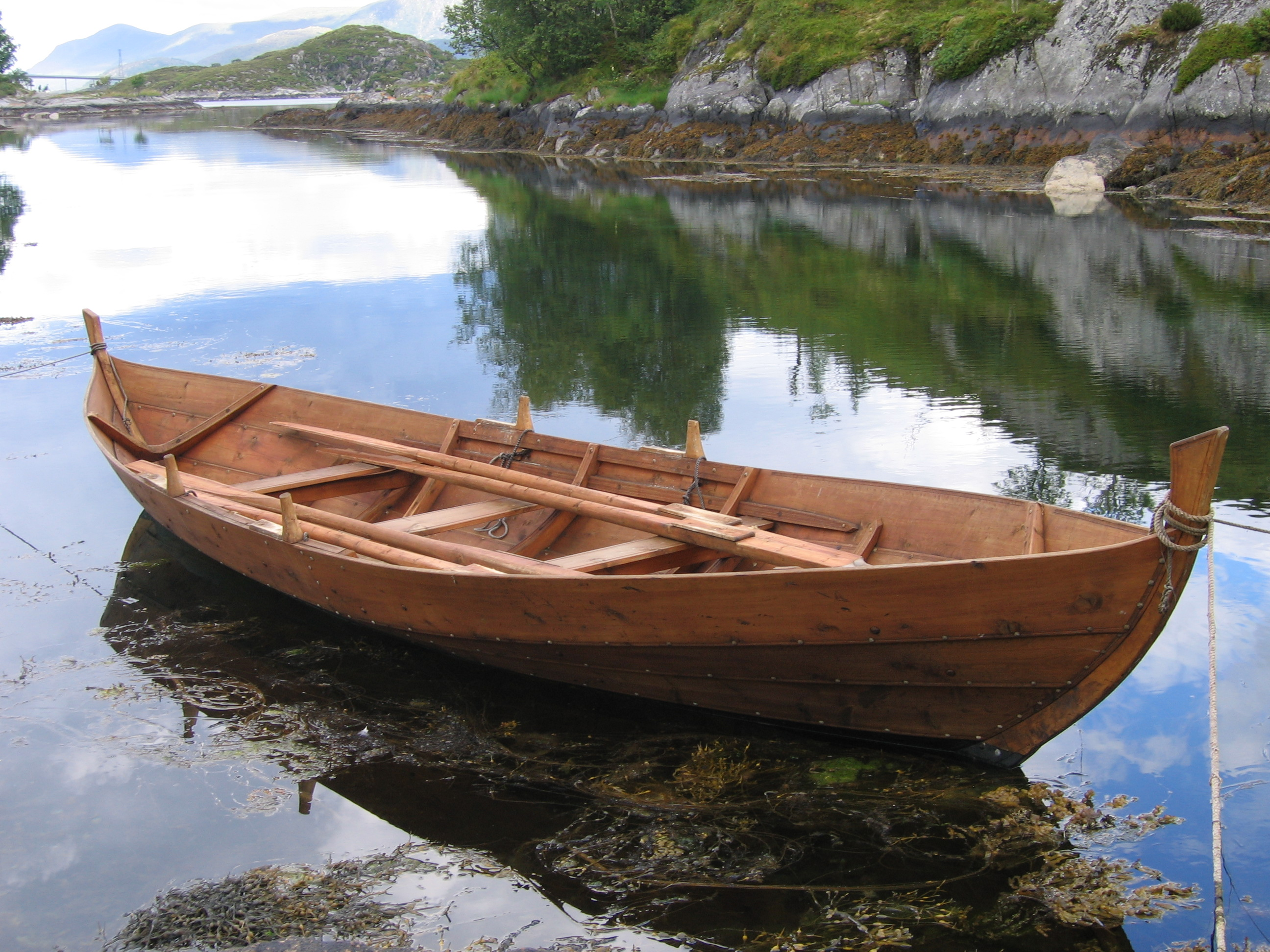
A Sunnmørsfæring; a Norwegian four-oared rowing boat, from the region Sunnmøre (Herøy kystmuseum, Herøy, Møre og Romsdal, Norway)

Spring in the keel or rocker influences how a rowing boat performs. Longer, slender race boats have less rocker of about 7.6 cm (3 in). A short 2.4-meter (8 ft) pram dinghy has a rocker of 15–18 cm (6–7 in). Boats with less rocker are easier to row and faster in flat or nearly flat water. However, in any waves a boat with 13–15 cm (5–6 in) of rocker will be more seaworthy—rising over waves rather than going through them. A boat with more rocker can change direction easily whereas a straight keel boat will track well in a straight line but resist turning. High sided and fine-ended boats, such as dories, are affected by wind. Their trim can be altered by using a plastic container of water attached to a rope that can be moved to the bow or stern as need be. Long-distance rowers can keep up a steady 20 strokes per minute compared to a racing shell which can be rowed at 30–40 strokes per minute or more by fit athletes (depending on distance and racing circumstances).

A rower can maintain high stroke-rates per minute for only a brief period. Longer, narrower rowing boats can reach 7 knots (13 km/h; 8.1 mph) but most rowing boats of 4.3 m (14 ft) can be rowed at 3–4 knots (5.6–7.4 km/h; 3.5–4.6 mph). Many old rowing boats have very full ends (blunt ends); these may appear at first glance to be bad design as it looks slow, not fast. However a full-ended rowing boat will rise to a sea and not dig in as a finer hulled boat might do, thus a compromise needs to be made between the factors of speed and of seaworthiness. This style of rowing boat was designed to carry a bigger load and the full sections gave far more displacement. Also older boats were often very heavily constructed compared to their modern counterpart, hence weighed far more. A rowing boat designed as a tender carrying occupants to a boat on a mooring might tend to be short, whilst a boat for use on rivers and to travel long distances might be long and narrow.

== Oars ==
Over time the design, of both the oars and the blades, has significantly changed. Typically, the part of the oars that are inboard of the rowlock have stayed the same length but the outboard part has gotten shorter. The different lengths of the oars affect both the energy that the rower has to put in as well as the performance, in terms of speed of the rowing boat.

A short oar makes quick but short strokes possible. A short oar is easier to use in a narrow creek or a crowded anchorage. This is important in a small tender which may be heavily laden with passengers, limiting the swing of the oars. A short, quick stroke prevents the bow being driven under in choppy waters while heavily laden. Longer oars can be used to produce longer, slower strokes, which are easier to maintain over long distances. Designers may match oar length to the amount of space provided for oar storage in the boat. Wooden oars are generally made of a light, strong wood, such as fir or ash. The blades can either be flat for general use or spooned for faster propulsion. In modern racing boats, oars are created from a composite of materials such as carbon fiber which makes them lightweight.

== Whitehall rowing boats ==
The origins of this distinctive and practical craft are unclear. In earlier times, however, builders were often sailors or seafaring men. Successful designs for large and small craft alike evolved slowly and as certain desirable qualities were attained and perfected they rarely changed.

Some hold that the Whitehall rowing boat design was introduced from England. However the famed nautical historian Howard I. Chapelle, cites the opinion of the late W. P. Stephens that in New York City there is a Whitehall Street and this was where the Whitehall was first built. Chapelle, Stephens and others agree that the design came into existence some time in the 1820s in New York City, having first been built by navy yard apprentices who had derived their model to some extent from the old naval gig.

== See also ==
- Coastal and offshore rowing
- College rowing
- Ocean rowing
- Racing shell
- Rowing exercise
- Single scull
- Rowing (sport)
- Sculling
