= Alex Hai =

Transgender man

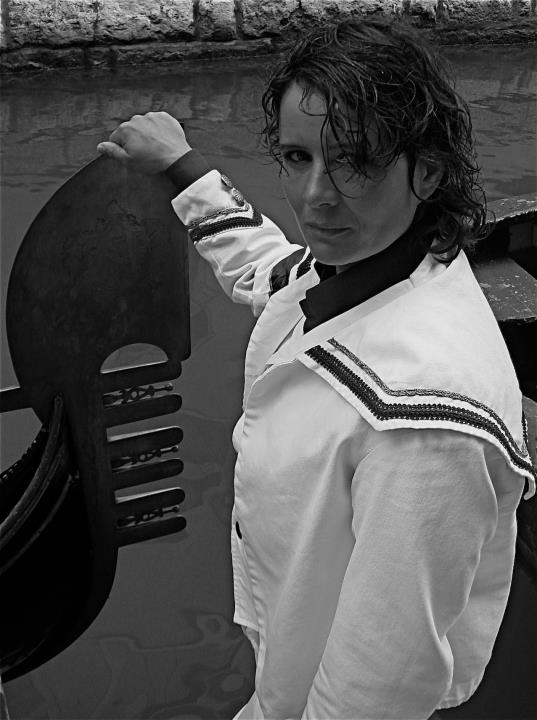
Portrait of gondoliere Alex Hai near the "ferro" of his gondola Pegaso, in Venice, Italy.

Alex Hai (born 1967 in Hamburg) is a transgender man of German and Algerian descent who before coming out as a transgender man was regarded as the first woman to be a gondolier in Venice. He is now the first openly transgender gondolier in Italy.

== Biography ==
As gondoliers have been a traditionally male-dominated industry for centuries, the city of Venice and the gondolier industry refused to grant Hai a license and do not recognize him as a gondolier due to his status as a private gondolier and as someone assigned female-at-birth. Commonly called "la gondoliera" (the feminine form of "gondoliere") or the "prima gondoliera" (first woman gondolier), when he was considered a woman, he operates as a private gondolier for hotels and selected clients as a self-run business. In December 2015, the highest court in Rome recognized Hai as the "first female gondolier to operate in Venice"; this was before he came out as a transgender man.

In 1996, Hai began as an apprentice gondolier working on the “traghetto”, the gondola ferry that carries people from one side to the other of the Grand Canal and back. He attempted and failed the test to apply for one of the coveted and limited (425) public gondolier licenses several times; in 1997, he failed to pass the written exam to become substitute gondolier, a failure largely attributed to the uncommon presence of media and public at his test. Subsequently, he failed the rowing test in 1999, though the result was nullified on the grounds that the commission had been composed exclusively by men, in contradiction of Italian law D.L. 29/1993 citing equal opportunity between men and women. Hai undertook the test again, but was granted a lower score than his previous attempt.

Public attention to Hai's failures resulted in reactions from public figures. Roberto Sussberg, jury member of the test and director of Ente Gondola, the City hall office for the gondola's safeguard, said that the gondoliers were wrong to be hostile to Hai, citing precedents during the war when mothers and grandmothers rowed gondolas. Fulvio Scarpa, gondolier and president of the gondoliers' association from 1992 to 1998, initially encouraged Hai to attempt the test; he said that part of the commission had willfully obstructed him and that it would be better for the gondoliers to give him the public licence.

Unable to obtain an official license, Hai began operating as a private gondolier, in a manner similar to when patrician families kept their own gondolas and their own private gondoliers, known as gondoliers "de casada”;. In recognition of reviving the tradition, Hai dresses in a reproduction of an eighteenth-century gondolier uniform from the private collection of the Venetian Count Girolamo Marcello. He is currently the gondolier de casada in Venice; the previous and last one was the gondolier of Peggy Guggenheim. In July 2005, Hai launched his own gondola, "Pegaso" (Pegasus) after the winged horse in Greek mythology, and dedicated the boat to French revolutionary Anacharsis Cloots, a Prussian aristocrat who was made a French citizen by the Revolution Convention Nationale and was executed in 1794. The “ferro” (the iron ornament on the front of the gondola) is a reproduction from an ancient one, characterized by a patrician family badge and a sea serpent on its tip. The gondola was restored by Gianfranco “Crea” Vianello, a Venetian gondola builder from the island of Giudecca, who has supported Hai in his pursuit to become a gondolier and mentored him in fine-tuning his rowing technique. Hai chose the Venetian language verse as the theme for his gondola: "E la luna nassara’ per sognar un altro di’" (And the moon will be born to dream of another day).

In August 2010, Giorgia Boscolo became Venice's first fully licensed female gondolier.

Before becoming a gondolier, Hai had aspired to be a filmmaker. He resumed his art education in Hamburg and San Francisco and performed in his gondola during the Regata Storica in 1999. He has co-authored an art exhibition in a private gallery in Venice in 2014.

Hai came out as transgender in 2017.
