= Fórcola =

Venetian wooden rowlock

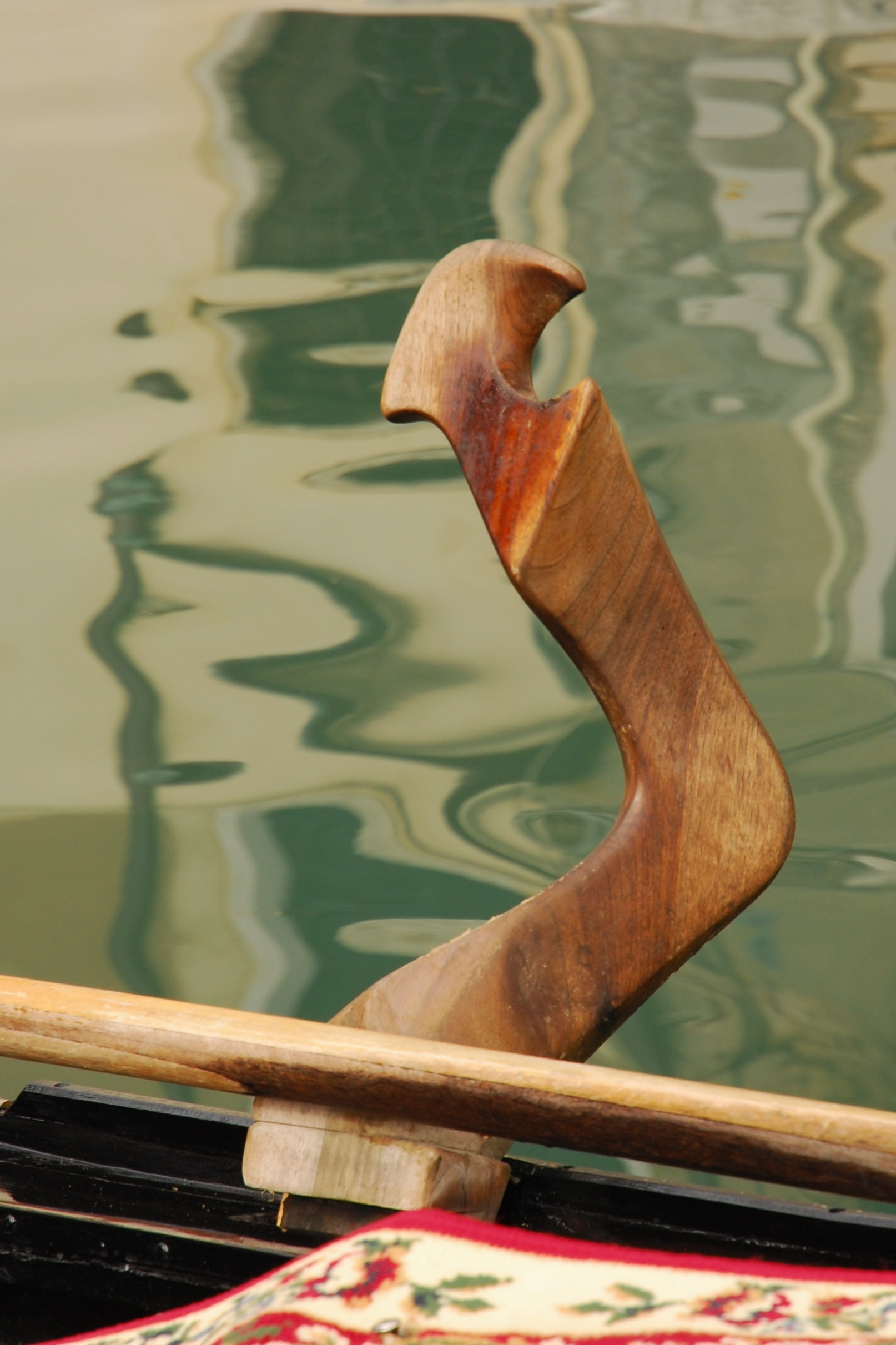
A Venetian fórcola.

Fórcola (Venetian dialect, plural Fórcole) is the typical Venetian rowlock providing a variety of fulcrum positions, each having its own effect on the rower's oar.

== Overview ==
The fórcola is quite a complicated object which developed throughout the centuries in reason of pure functionality. Nowadays only 10 out of 50 traditional Venetian boats are still in use, yet there are about 40 different types of forcolas. Each differs from the others according to both the ship typology and the position of rowing on it.

The modern stern fórcola of a gondola has eight different points of control to change the speed and the direction of the boat. Every single oxbow and elbow are studied to allow the movements of the oar in the water, which move and govern the boat. There are many possible movements of the oar but the main two are prèmer and stalìr.

Each fórcola is a unique piece since it is specifically designed for its personal gondolier (rower of gondolas), according to his height and rowing needs: a rule specifies that the external gondolier's arm must not go over the chin. Voga alla Veneta (Venetian rowing) — the most common, but not the only, type of rowing in Venice main islands — had its relevance in influencing the final shape of the stern fórcola for gondolas.

== Crafting ==
The fórcola is obtained from a quarter of trunk, usually of a walnut tree, but also cherry, pear, apple, or maple tree — 2 or 2.5 meters tall and 60 centimeters wide.

=== Choice of wood ===
The first step is the choice of the piece when still soft and young before the cut into quarters. Usually the centre of the trunk is cut down because of the lymphatic canal, easy to crack, and the external part, next to the bark, gets discarded for its darker colour. The mòrso gets carved from the most internal part of the trunk, while the comio from the most external one.

=== Seasoning ===
The wooden piece is seasoned for a couple of years. Then starts a stage of raw carving — some remèri still use the typical axe of carpenters — after which the piece is left for a year more to season. Without this long seasoning the wood would not acquire those essential qualities to make it endure over the oar friction and atmospheric agents.

=== Carving ===
The piece can then pass through a very meticulous stage of carving, which is still mainly made by hand. By starting from some basic templates, the remèr gives shape to the piece using some traditional tools. - the fero a do maneghi — a two-handled blade — which can have different sizes: the shorter the more appropriate to carve very narrow curves and vice versa. - the raschietto is used to refine the surface before the finishing: it comes in different sizes just like the fero.

=== Finishing ===
The surfaces of the piece are finally refined with sandpaper. The last step is giving two or three coats of a liquid mix composed by oil — olio paglierino — and a type of petrol. The finishing is together with the seasoning the stage that confers the appropriate physical characteristics to the fórcola.

== See also ==
- Watercraft rowing
- Venetian Arsenal

== Bibliography ==
- Caniato, G. (2007). L'Arte Dei Remèri. Verona: Cierre Edizioni. The most recent book on the matter. Text in Italian only.
- Penzo, G. (1997). Fórcole, Remi e Voga alla Veneta. Chioggia: Il Leggio. The most specific book on the specifics and data about themaking of rowlocks and oars. Text in Italian and English.
- Pastor, S. (1999). Fórcole. Venezia: Mare di Carta, Chioggia: Il Leggio. A very complete and artistic book on forcolas full of beautiful pictures. Text in Italian and English.
