= Indira Publishing =

Defunct Indonesian publisher of books and comics

Indira was an Indonesian publisher of books and comic books. They may have been founded in 1953. They closed in 2006.

Indira licensed the Tintin comics in 1975, and continued to print them until 1996. They translated the series into Bahasa Indonesia, basing their translation on the English-language translations. The Indira editions of the Tintin comics are now prized by Indonesian Tintin collectors; many collectors see their editions as being higher quality than the modern editions, citing translation differences, the lack of hand lettered text, and sturdier build quality.

Indira was known for reprinting and translating European comics into Bahasa Indonesia, particularly Belgian comics. They translated and published the Valérian and Laureline comics, the Smurfs comics, and the Asterix comics.

Indira also published some print books, including books in the Nancy Drew series and the Hardy Boys series.

== See also ==
Gramedia
