= Gondola =

Type of boat

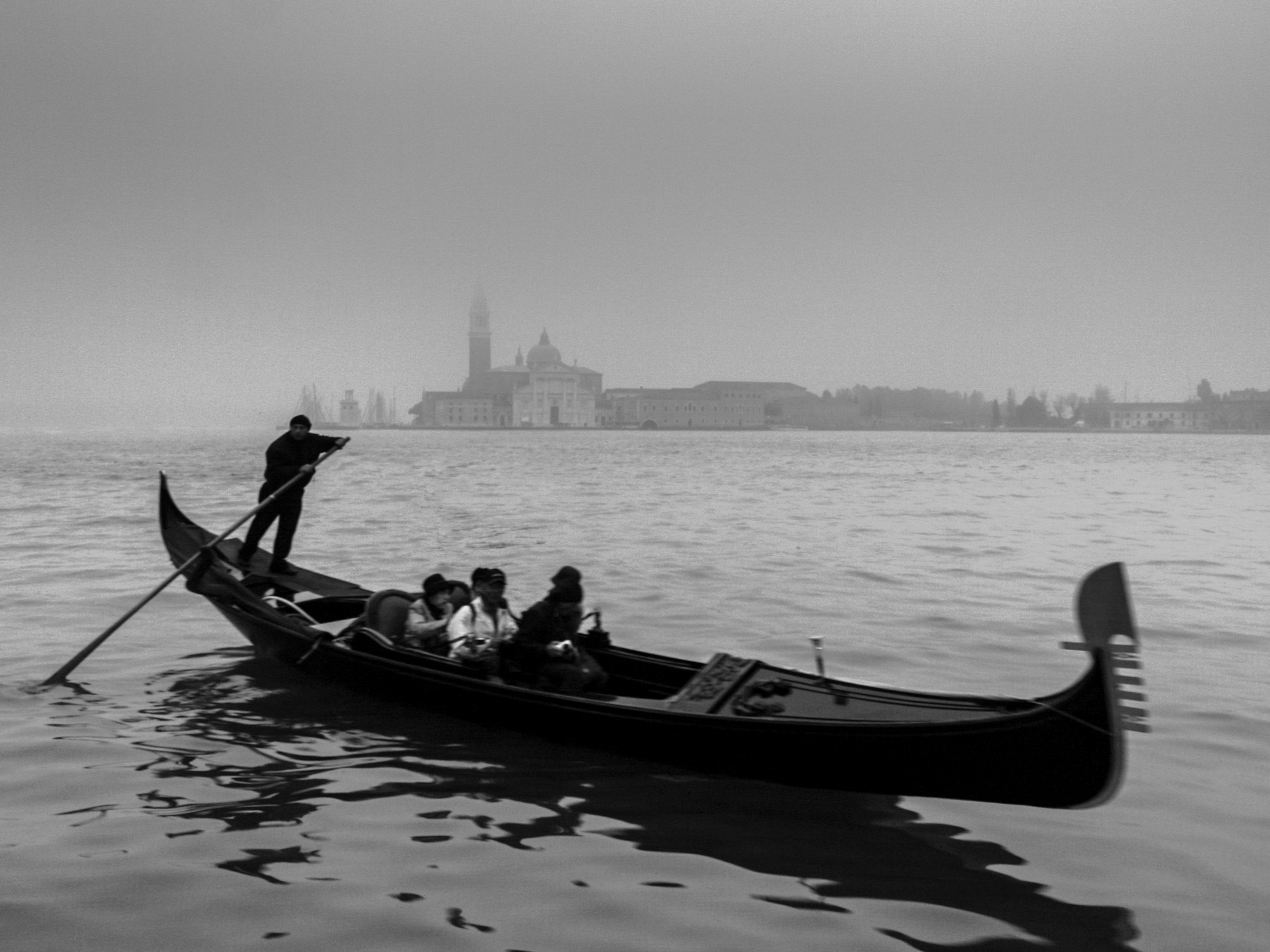
A gondola ride

The gondola (English: /ˈɡɒndələ/, Italian: [ˈɡondola]; Venetian: góndoła, Venetian: [ˈɡoŋdoɰa]) is a traditional, flat-bottomed Venetian rowing boat, well suited to the conditions of the Venetian lagoon in Italy. It is typically propelled by a gondolier, who uses a rowing oar, which is not fastened to the hull, in a sculling manner, and also acts as the rudder. The uniqueness of the gondola includes its being asymmetrical along the length, making the single-oar propulsion more efficient.

For centuries, the gondola was a major means of transportation and the most common watercraft within Venice. In modern times, the boats still do have a role in public transport in the city, serving as traghetti (small ferries) over the Grand Canal operated by two oarsmen.

Various types of gondola boats are also used in special regattas (rowing races) held amongst gondoliers. Their primary role today, however, is to carry tourists on rides at fixed rates. There are approximately 400 licensed gondoliers in Venice and a similar number of boats, down from the thousands that travelled the canals centuries ago. However, they are now elegantly crafted, as opposed to the various types of homemade boats of the past.

== History and usage ==
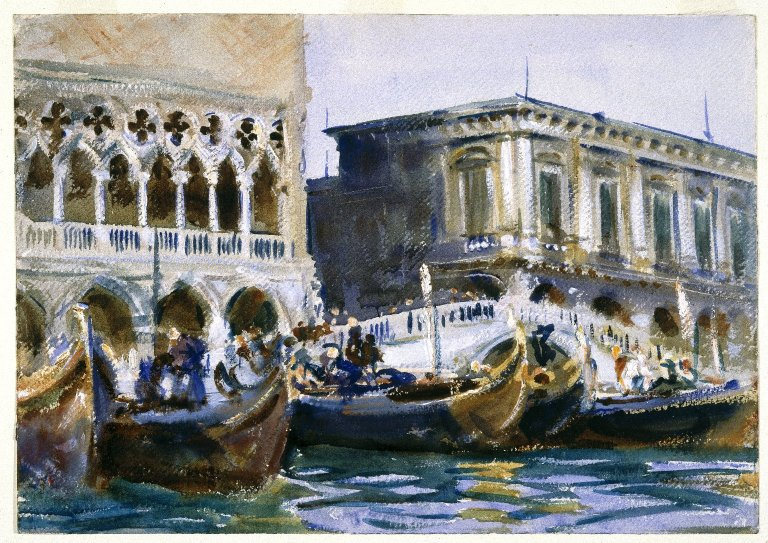
La Riva by John Singer Sargent

The gondola is propelled by a person (the gondolier) who stands on the stern facing the bow and rows with a forward stroke, followed by a compensating backward stroke. The oar rests in an elaborately carved wooden rest (forcola) shaped to project from the side of the craft so as to allow the slight drag of each return stroke to pull the bow back to its forward course. Because of the vessel's flat bottom it may also be "drifted" sideways when required. Contrary to popular belief, the gondola is never poled like a punt as the waters of Venice are too deep. Until the early 20th century, as many photographs attest, gondolas were often fitted with a "felze", a small cabin, to protect the passengers from the weather or from onlookers. Its windows could be closed with louvered shutters—the original "Venetian blinds".

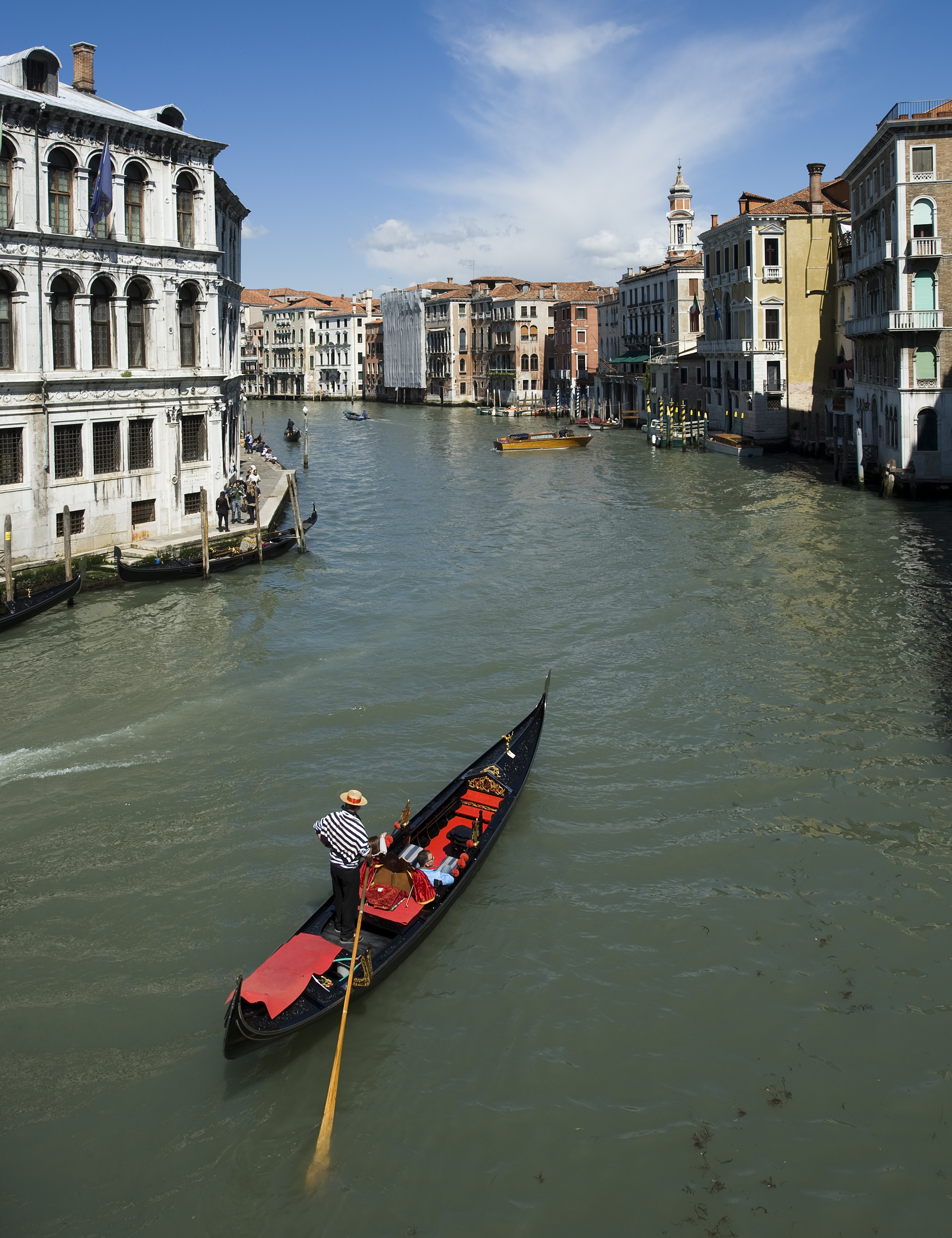
A gondola on the Grand Canal

After the elimination of the traditional felze—possibly in response to tourists' complaining that it blocked the view—there survived for some decades a kind of vestigial summer awning, known as the "tendalin" (these can be seen on gondolas as late as the mid-1950s, in the film Summertime (1955)). While in previous centuries gondolas could be many different colors, a sumptuary law of Venice required that gondolas should be painted black, and they are customarily so painted now.

The gondola has existed in Venice since the 11th century, being first mentioned by name in 1094. It is estimated that there were eight to ten thousand gondolas during the 17th and 18th century, but there are only around four hundred in active service today, with virtually all of them used for hire by tourists. Those few that are in private ownership are either hired out to Venetians for weddings or used for racing. Even though the gondola, by now, has become a widely publicized icon of Venice, in the times of the Republic of Venice it was by no means the only means of transportation; on the map of Venice created by Jacopo de' Barbari in 1500, only a fraction of the boats are gondolas, the majority of boats are batellas, caorlinas, galleys, and other boats. Now, only a handful of batellas survive, and caorlinas are used for racing only.

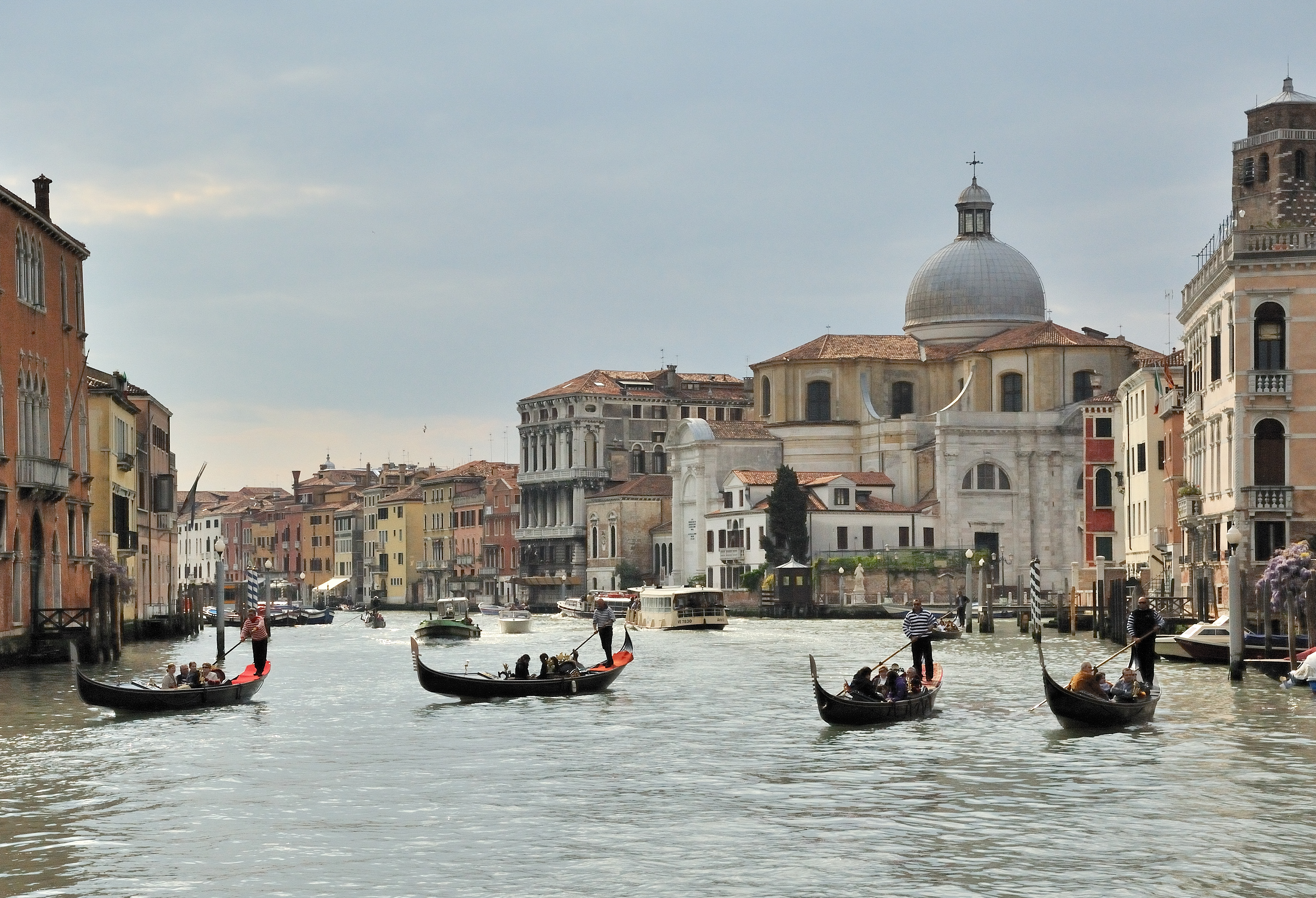
Gondolas on the Grand Canal

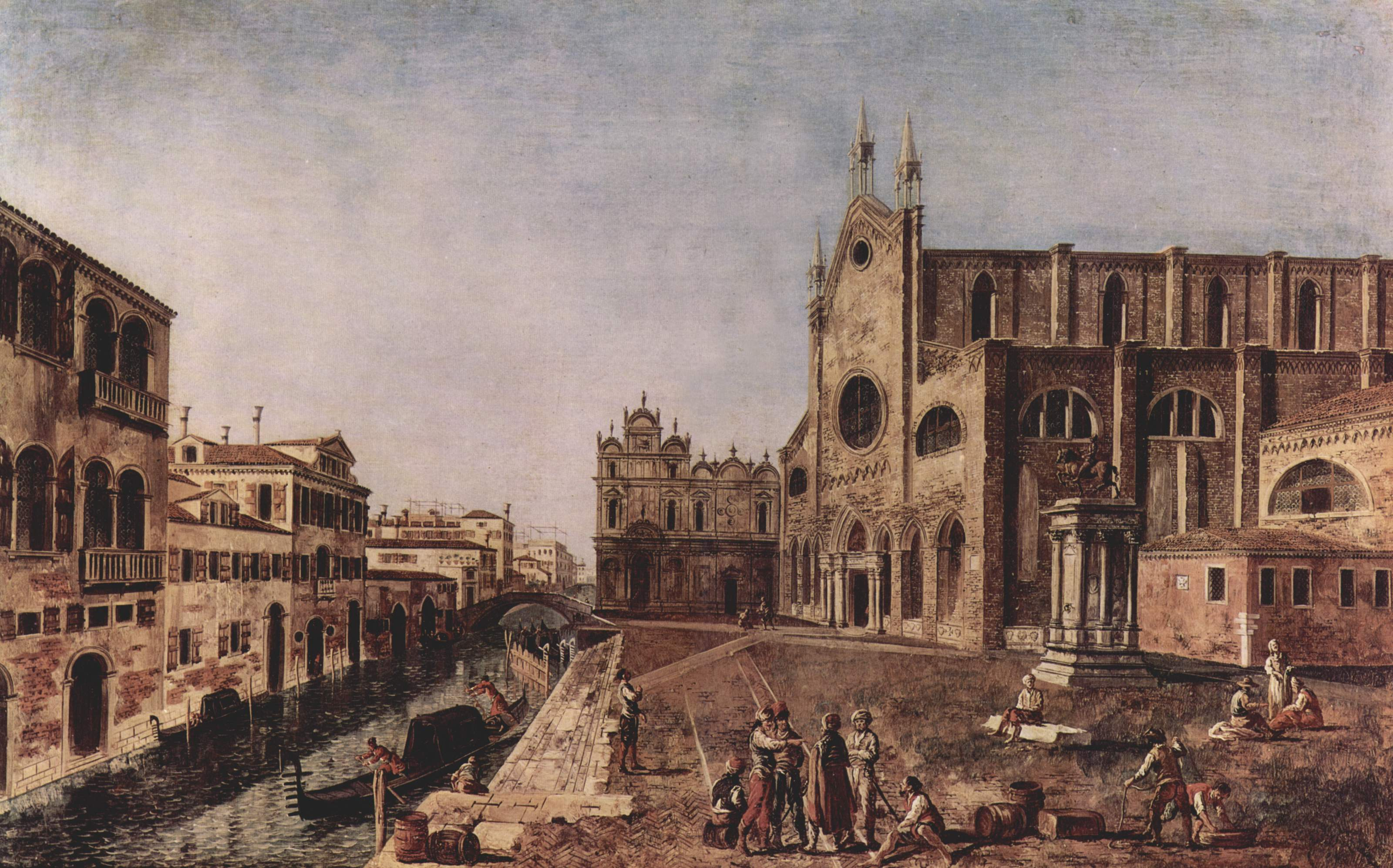
Gondolas at Santi Giovanni e Paolo in a painting by Michele Marieschi

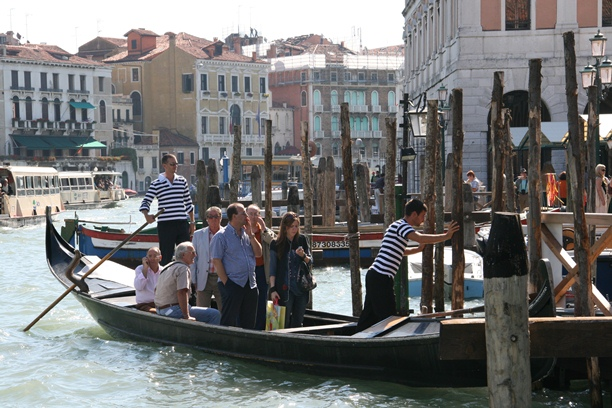
Traghetti; by 2017, only three remained in Venice.

The historical gondola was quite different from its modern evolution; the paintings of Canaletto and others show a much lower prow, a higher "ferro", and usually two rowers. The banana-shaped modern gondola was developed only in the 19th century by the boat-builder Tramontin, whose heirs still run the Tramontin boatyard. The construction of the gondola continued to evolve until the mid-20th century, when the city government prohibited any further modifications.

In the 1500s an estimated 10,000 gondolas of all types were in Venice; in 1878 an estimated 4000 and now approximately 400.

The origin of the word "gondola" has never been satisfactorily established, despite many theories.

=== Current design ===
Today's gondola is up to 11 m long and 1.6 m wide, with a mass of 350 kg. They are made of 280 hand-made pieces using eight types of wood (lime, oak, mahogany, walnut, cherry, fir, larch and elm). The process takes about two months; in 2013, the cost of a gondola was about 38,000 euros. The oar or rèmo is held in an oarlock known as a fórcola. The forcola is of a complicated shape, allowing several positions of the oar for slow forward rowing, powerful forward rowing, turning, slowing down, rowing backwards, and stopping. The ornament on the front of the boat is called the fèrro (meaning iron) and can be made from brass, stainless steel, or aluminium. It serves as decoration and as counterweight for the gondolier standing near the stern.

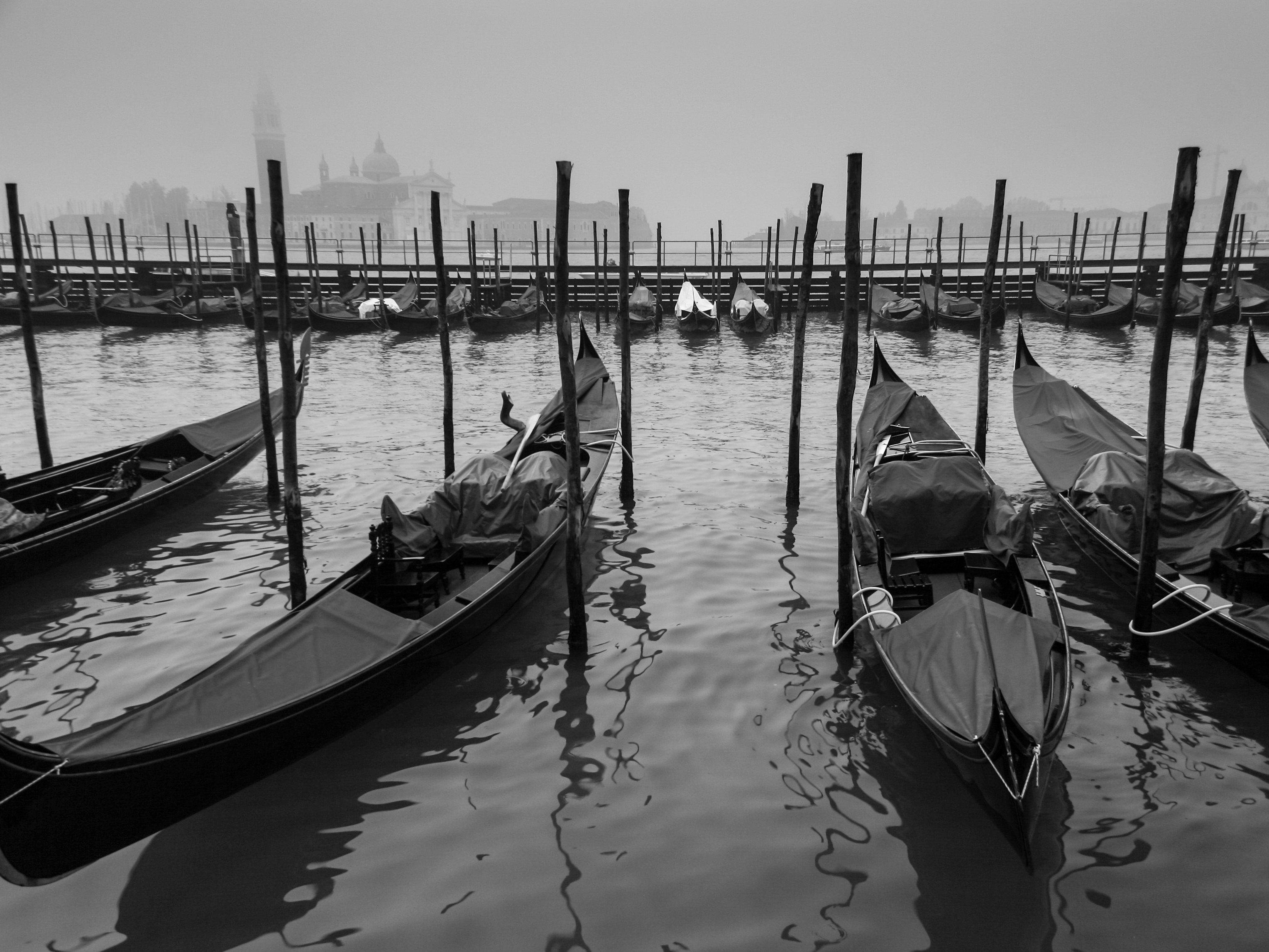
Gondolas at their moorings

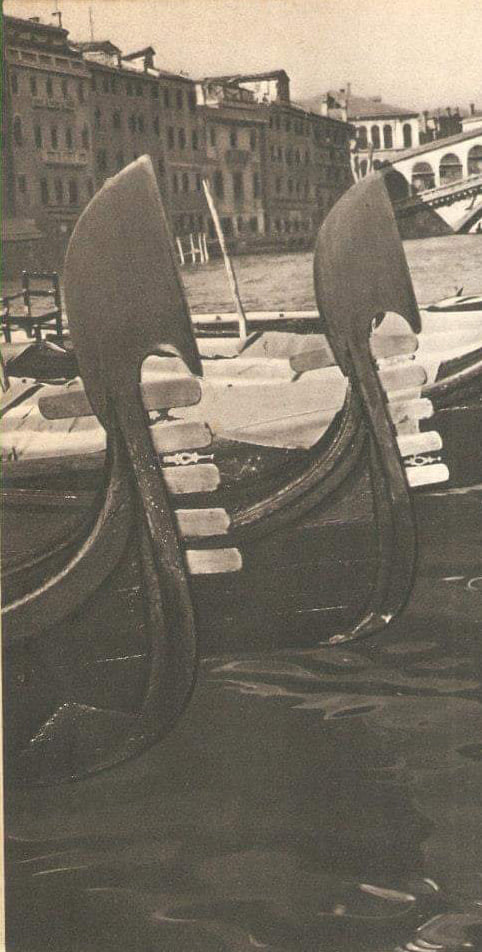
5-toothed fero on old gondolas

According to a popular urban legend with no factual basis, every detail of the gondola has its own symbolism. The iron prow-head of the gondola, called "fero da prorà" or "dolfin", is needed to balance the weight of the gondolier at the stern and has an "Ƨ" shape symbolic of the twists in the Canal Grande. Under the main blade there is a kind of comb with six teeth or prongs ("rebbi") pointing forward standing for the six districts or "sestieri" of Venice (however, this is contradicted by the fact that old photographs and paintings show gondolas with 4 or 5 teeth). A kind of tooth juts out backwards toward the centre of the gondola symbolises the island of Giudecca. The curved top signifies the Doge's cap. The semi-circular break between the curved top and the six teeth is said to represent the Rialto Bridge. Sometimes three friezes can be seen in-between the six prongs, indicating the three main islands of the city: Murano, Burano and Torcello. This symbolism is likely influenced by the need to explain the shape to tourists, rather than the shape being influenced by those symbols, as they are not mentioned in any writings about the gondola prior to the current evolution of the shape of the Fero.

The gondola is also one of the vessels typically used in both ceremonial and competitive regattas, rowing races held amongst gondoliers using the technique of Voga alla Veneta.

== Gondolieri ==
During their heyday as a means of public transports, teams of four men would share ownership of a gondola – three oarsmen (gondoliers) and a fourth person, primarily shore-based and responsible for the booking and administration of the gondola (Il Rosso Riserva).

However, as the gondolas became more of a tourist attraction than a mode of public transport all but one of these cooperatives and their offices have closed. The category is now protected by the Institution for the Protection and Conservation of Gondolas and Gondoliers, headquartered in the historical center of Venice.

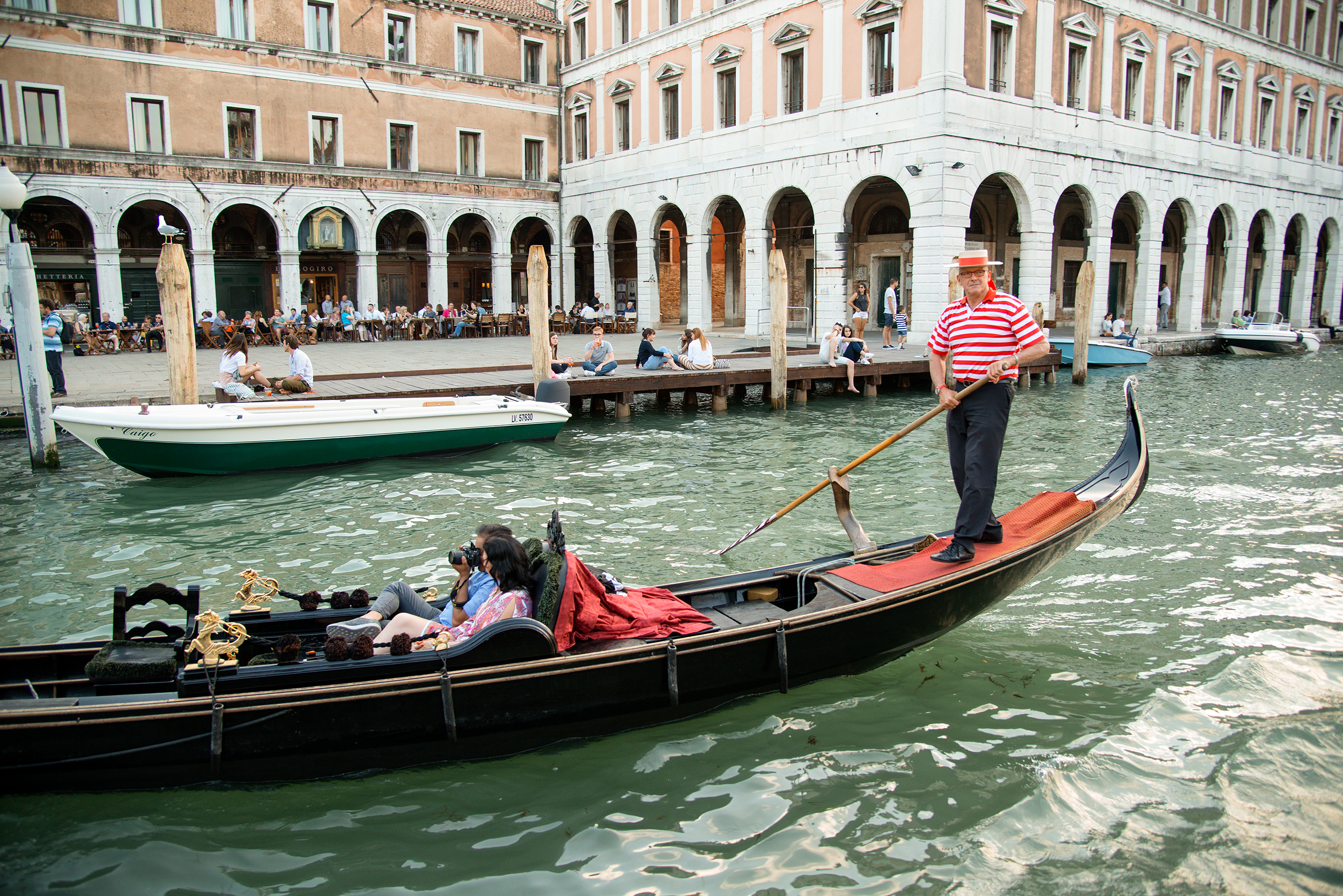
Gondolier

The profession of gondolier is controlled by a guild, which issues a limited number of licenses (approximately 400), granted after periods of training (400 hours over six months) and apprenticeship, and a major comprehensive exam which tests knowledge of Venetian history and landmarks, foreign language skills, and practical skills in handling the gondola. Such skills are necessary in the tight spaces of Venetian canals. Gondoliers dress in a blue or red striped top, red neckerchief, wide-brimmed straw hat and dark pants. A gondolier can earn the equivalent of up to US$150,000 per year.

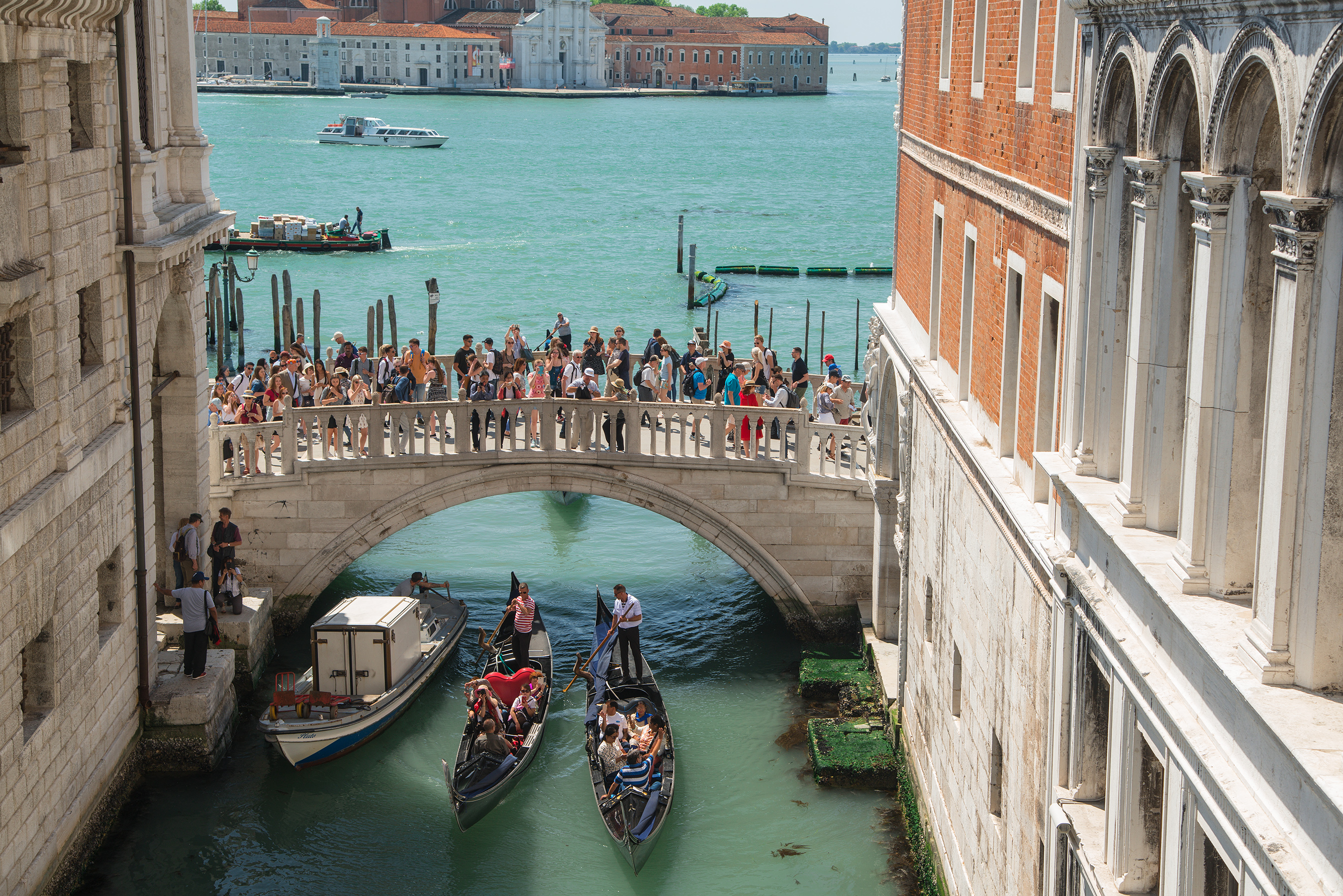
Gondoliers plying their craft in a narrow canal

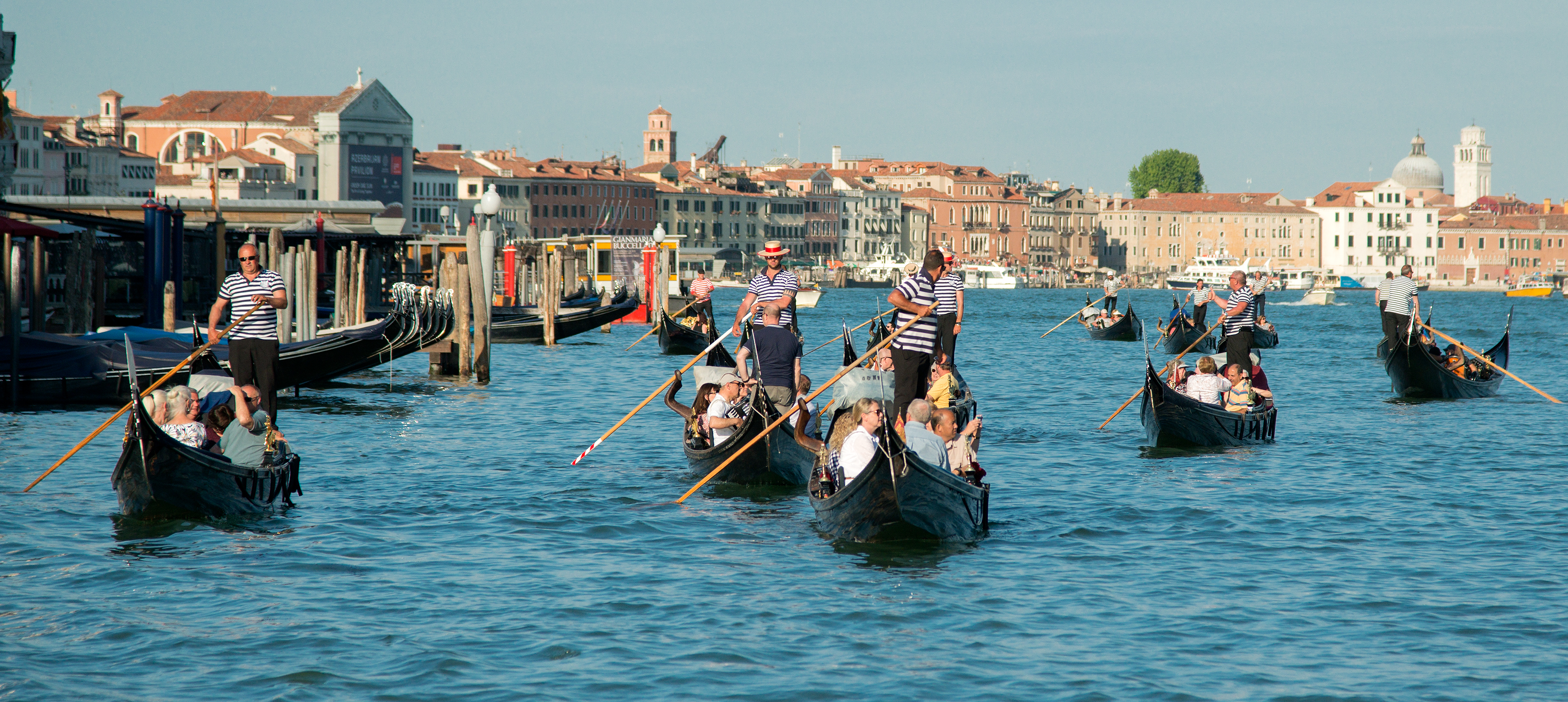
On the Grand Canal

In August 2010, Giorgia Boscolo became Venice's first fully licensed female gondolier.

In 2017, Alex Hai came out as transgender, making him the first openly transgender gondolier in Venice and all Italy.

== Outside of Venice ==
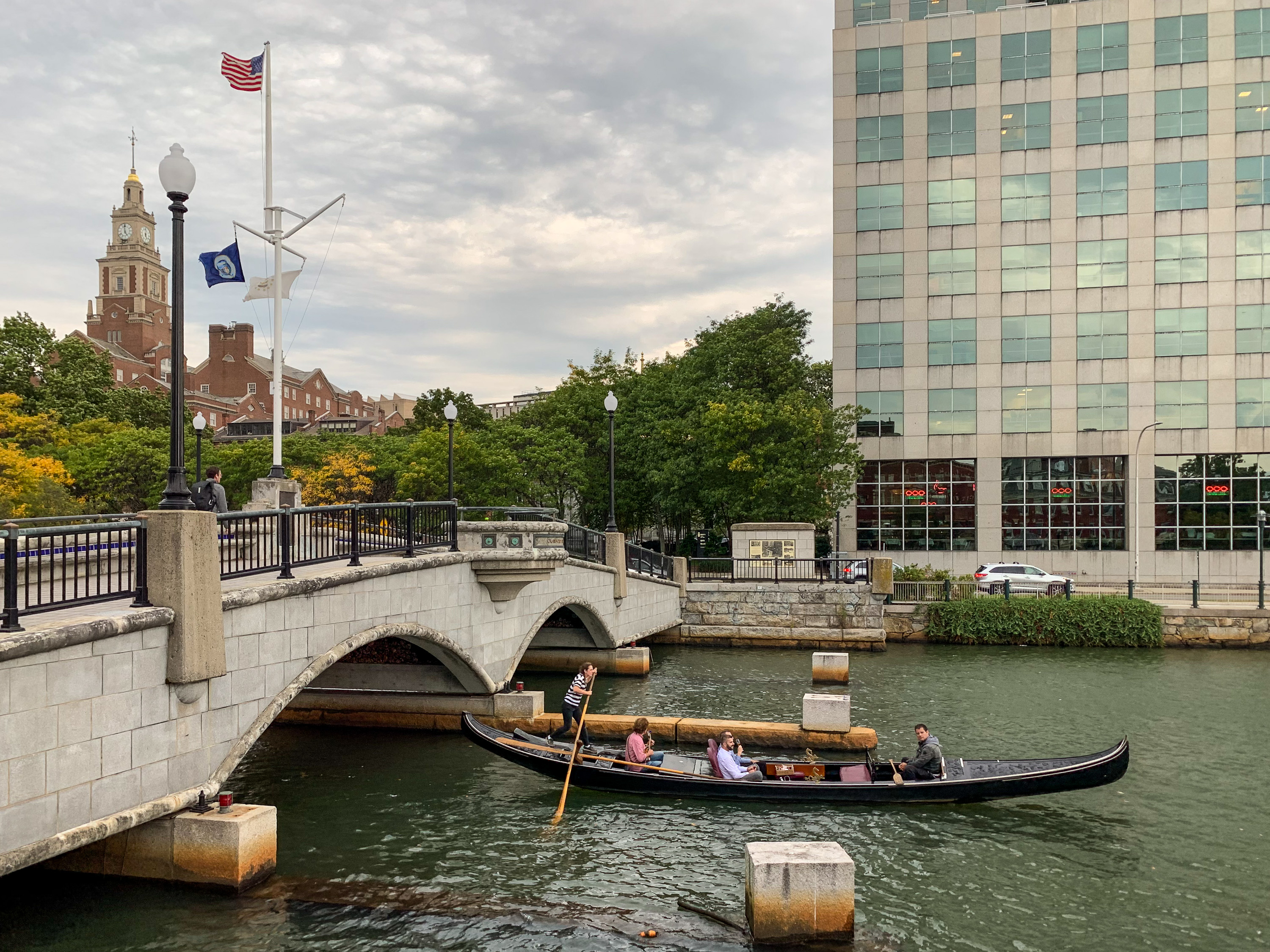
Gondola on the Providence River, Rhode Island

The umbrella organization Comitato Internationale di Voga Veneta (CIVV) networks almost a dozen rowing clubs across Europe and the US which offer Venetian rowing recreationally. Member clubs row on the Main river in Germany, the Thames in Oxford, the Erdre and the Seine in France, and through the canals of Amsterdam. CIVV organizes a yearly regatta, usually raced in a sandalo or a mascaretta.

There are about a half dozen cities in the United States where gondolas are operated as tourist attractions, including New Orleans, the Charles River in Boston, Stillwater (Minnesota), New York's Central Park, and the Providence River in Rhode Island, as well as several in California. The annual U.S. Gondola Nationals competitions have been held since 2011, and feature American Gondoliers competing in sprints and slalom races,

The Venetian casino in Las Vegas has featured “gondolas” as part of its marketing since opening in 1999. The hull is flat-bottomed, made of fibre glass and contains a small electric motor.

== References in literature and history ==
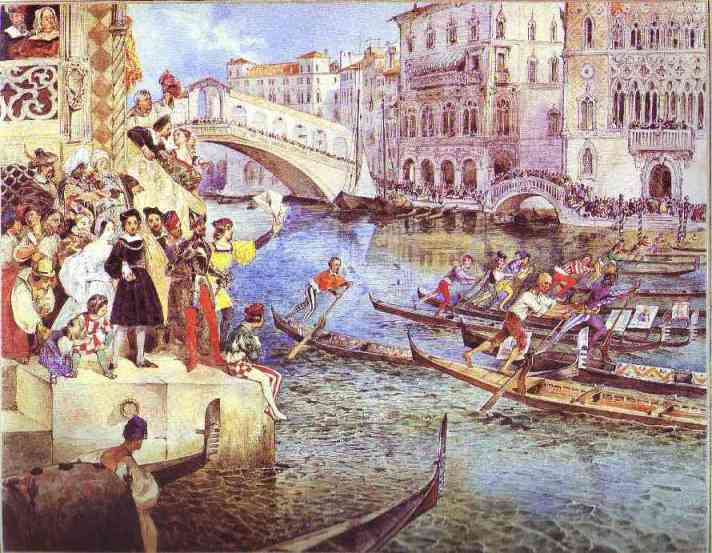
Gondola Races on the Grand Canal of Venice, by Grigory Gagarin (1830s) "Gondolinos, a slimmer and light-weight version of the gondola, were built for racing and elegant outings.

Mark Twain visited Venice in the summer of 1867. He dedicated much of The Innocents Abroad, chapter 23, to describing the curiosity of urban life with gondolas and gondoliers.

The first act of Gilbert and Sullivan's two-act comic operetta The Gondoliers is set in Venice, and its two protagonists (as well as its men's chorus) are of the eponymous profession, even though the political irony that makes up the core of the piece has much more to do with British society than with Venice.

== See also ==
- Rower woman
- Rowing
- Sandolo
- Sculling
- Water taxi
