= Forlagshuset Vigmostad & Bjørke =

Norwegian publishing company

Forlagshuset Vigmostad & Bjørke is the fourth largest publishing house in Norway. The company was started in 1990 by Arno Vigmostad and Arstein Bjørke. It publishes literature and text books, and owns both physical and online book retailers.

In the last 10 years the company has bought a range of competing and complementary businesses, such as Piratforlaget, Akademika Bokhandel, Haugenbok.no Schibsted Forlag and NKI Forlag.

Vigmostad & Bjørke's main office is in Bergen but it also has offices in Oslo, Trondheim, Sopot (Poland) and Delhi (India). It had a revenue of 1 billion Norwegian kroner in 2017.
