= Flipper (anatomy) =

Flattened limb adapted for propulsion and maneuvering in water

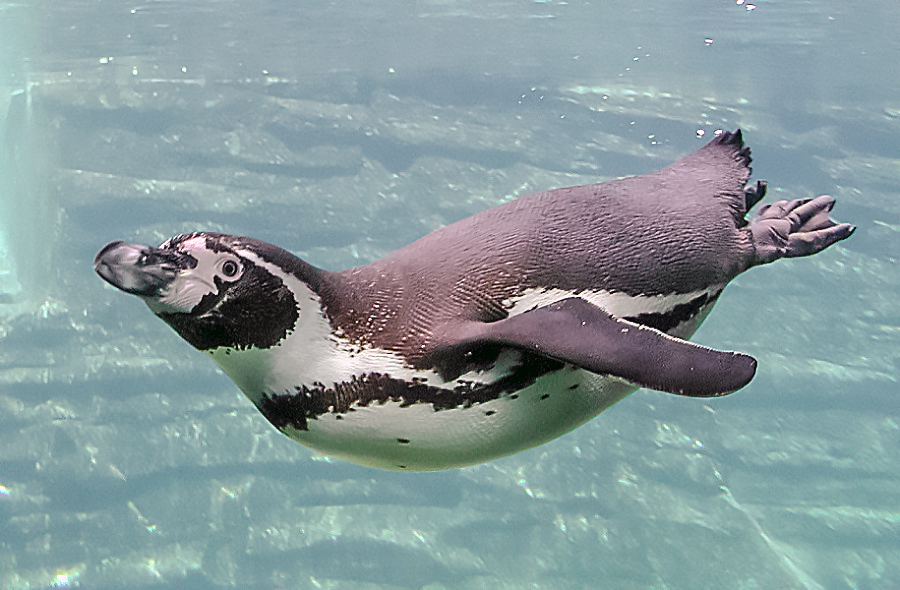
Humboldt penguin swimming. Penguin wings evolved into short, strong flippers after acquiring flightlessness.

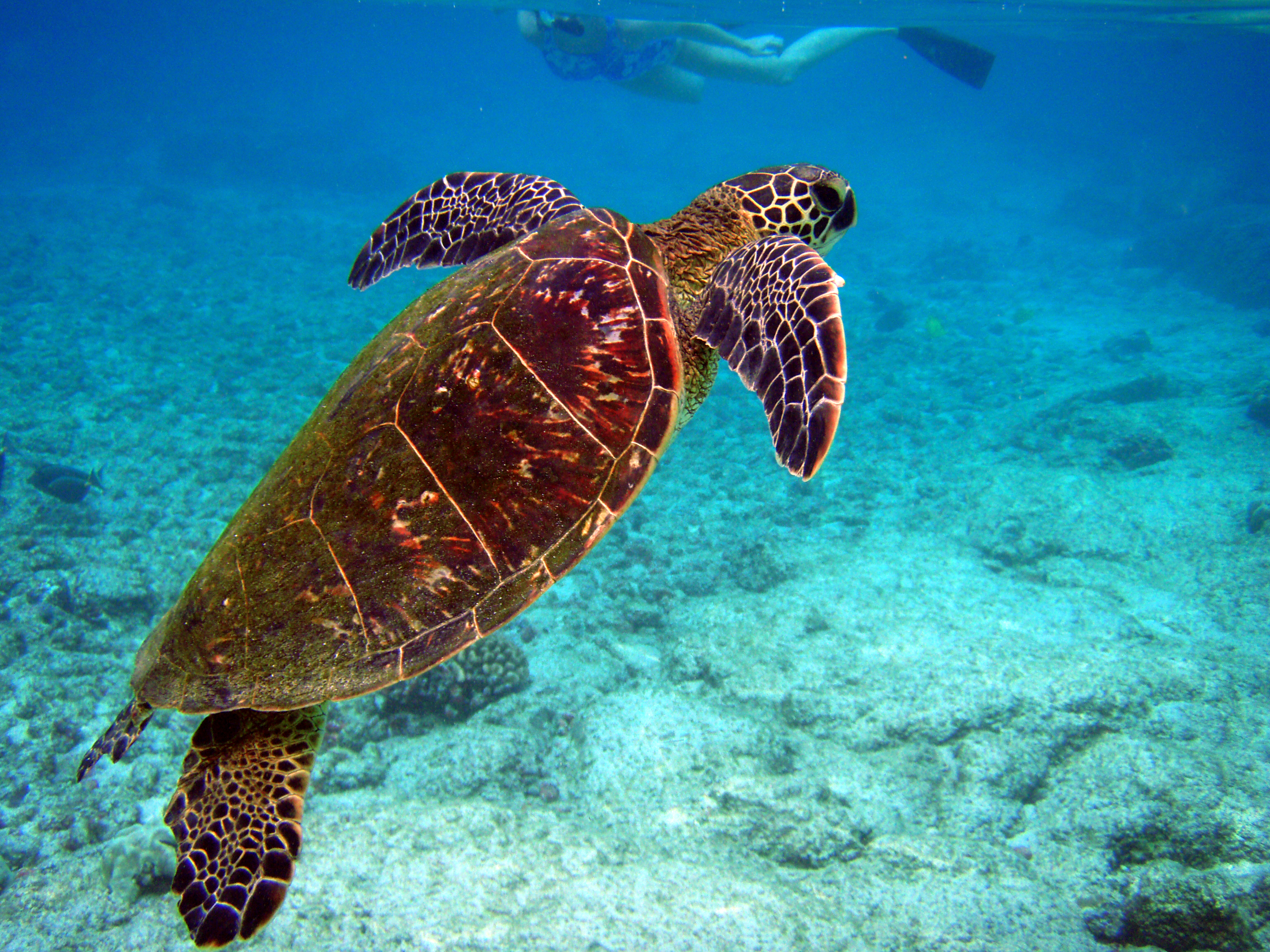
This green turtle is about to break the surface for air at Kona, Hawaii.

A flipper is a broad, flattened limb adapted for aquatic locomotion. It refers to the fully webbed, swimming appendages of aquatic vertebrates that are not fish.

In animals with two flippers, such as whales, the flipper refers solely to the forelimbs. In animals with four flippers, such as pinnipeds and sea turtles, one may distinguish fore- and hind-flippers, or pectoral flippers and pelvic flippers.

Animals with flippers include penguins (whose flippers are also called wings), cetaceans (e.g., dolphins and whales), pinnipeds (e.g., walruses, earless and eared seals), sirenians (e.g., manatees and dugongs), and marine reptiles such as the sea turtles and the now-extinct plesiosaurs, mosasaurs, ichthyosaurs, and metriorhynchids.

Usage of the terms "fin" and "flipper" is sometimes inconsistent, even in the scientific literature. However, the hydrodynamic control surfaces of fish are always referred to as "fins" and never "flippers". Tetrapod limbs which have evolved into fin-like structures are usually (but not always) called "flippers" rather than fins. The dorsal structure on cetaceans is called the "dorsal fin" and the large cetacean tails are referred to primarily as flukes but occasionally as "caudal fins"; neither of these structures are flippers.

Some flippers are very efficient hydrofoils, analogous to wings (airfoils), used to propel and maneuver through the water with great speed and maneuverability (see Foil). Swimming appendages with the digits still apparent, as in the webbed forefeet of amphibious turtles and platypus, are considered paddles rather than flippers.

== Locomotion ==
For all species of aquatic vertebrates, swimming performance depends upon the animal's control surfaces, which include flippers, flukes and fins. Flippers are used for different types of propulsion, control, and rotation. In cetaceans, they are primarily used for control while the fluke is used for propulsion.

The evolution of flippers in penguins was at the expense of their flying capabilities, in spite of evolving from an auk-like ancestor that could 'fly' underwater as well in the air. No penguins capable of flight have been found in the fossil record, so we know very little about what birds preceded the flightless penguin. Form constrains function, and the wings of diving flying species, such as the murre or cormorant have not developed into flippers. However, species such as these that can both fly and dive support the hypothesis that penguins would have evolved from a bird that could fly and dive before losing flight completely. In fact, murres and cormorants have extremely high flight costs and higher dive costs than penguins, showing that there is a tradeoff between efficiency in the air and efficiency in the water.

The flippers of penguins became flatter, denser, and smaller while being modified for hydrodynamic properties. The functionality of the penguin hydrofoil comes from the wing bones themselves as opposed to feathers in a volant bird. Their bones have the thickest cortical bone of any bird, a very small medullary cavity, and are considered largely osteosclerotic. There is also fusing of digits and joints within the penguin wing that prevent most flexion and extension.

=== Hydrodynamics ===
Cetacean flippers may be viewed as being analogous to modern engineered hydrofoils, which have hydrodynamic properties: lift coefficient, drag coefficient and efficiency. Flippers are one of the principal control surfaces of cetaceans (whales, dolphins and porpoises) due to their position in front of the center of mass, and their mobility which provides three degrees of freedom.

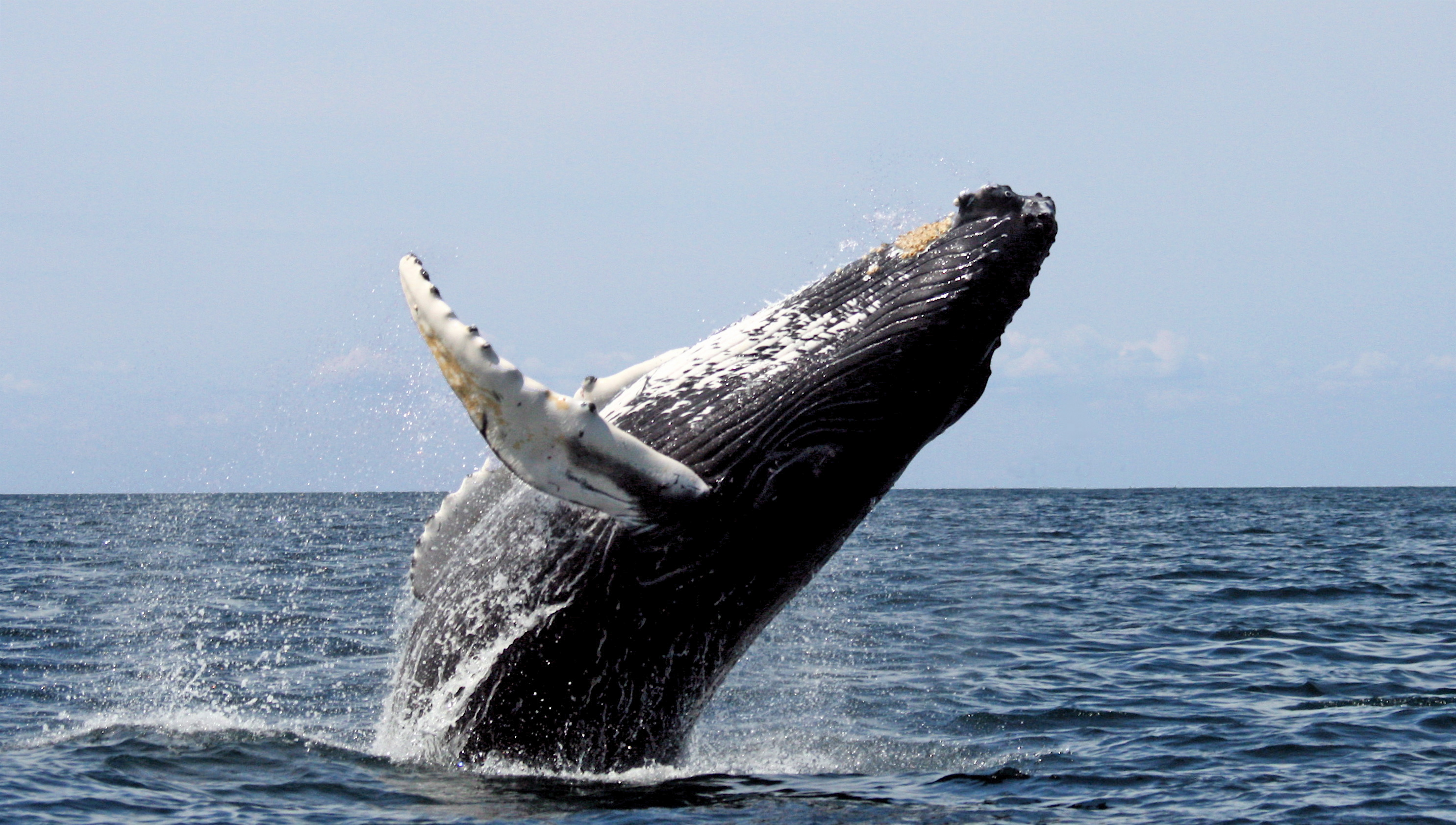
The tubercles on the flippers of humpback whales improve the hydrodynamics of the flipper at their size. Breaking up channels of fast-moving water allows humpbacks to retain their "grip" on the water, and turn at sharper angles even at low velocities.

Flippers on humpback whales (Megaptera novaeangliae) have non-smooth leading edges, yet demonstrate superior fluid dynamics to the characteristically smooth leading edges of artificial wings, turbines and other kinds of blades. The whale's surprising dexterity is due primarily to its non-conventional flippers, which have large, irregular looking bumps called tubercles across their leading edges. The tubercles break up the passage of water, maintaining even channels of the fast-moving water, limiting turbulence and providing greater maneuverability.

The foreflippers used by the pinnipeds act as oscillatory hydrofoils. Both fore and hind flippers are used for turning. A 2007 study of Steller's sea lion found that a majority of thrust was produced during the drive phase of the fore flipper stroke cycle. Although previous findings on eared seals suggested that thrust was generated by the initial outward movement of the fore flippers or the terminal drag-based paddling phase, the 2007 study found that little or no thrust was generated during those phases. Swimming performance in sea lions is modulated by changes in the duration and intensity of movements without changing their sequence. Using criteria based on velocity and the minimum radius of turns, pinnipeds' maneuverability is superior to cetaceans but inferior to many fish.

== Evolution of flippers ==
Marine mammals have evolved several times, developing similar flippers. The forelimbs of cetaceans, pinnipeds, and sirenians presents a classic example of convergent evolution. There is widespread convergence at the gene level. Distinct substitutions in common genes created various aquatic adaptations, most of which constitute parallel evolution because the substitutions in question are not unique to those animals.

=== Digit processes ===
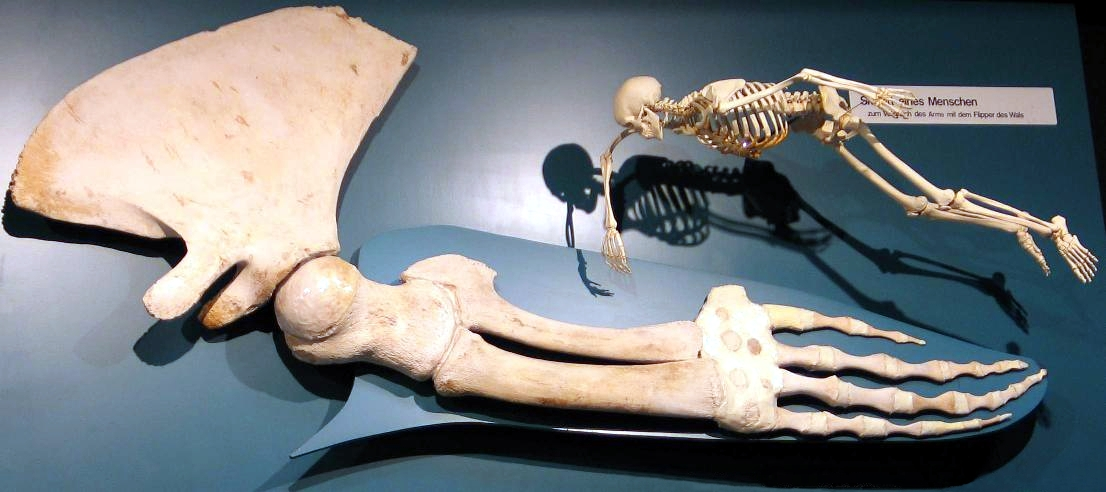
Close up skeletal of fin whale flipper

Whales and their relatives have a soft tissue flipper that encases most of the forelimb, and elongated digits with an increased number of phalanges. Hyperphalangy is an increase in the number of phalanges beyond the plesiomorphic mammal condition of three phalanges-per-digit. This trait is characteristic of secondarily aquatic vertebrates with flippers. Hyperphalangy was present among extinct ichthyosaurs, plesiosaurs, and mosasaurs.

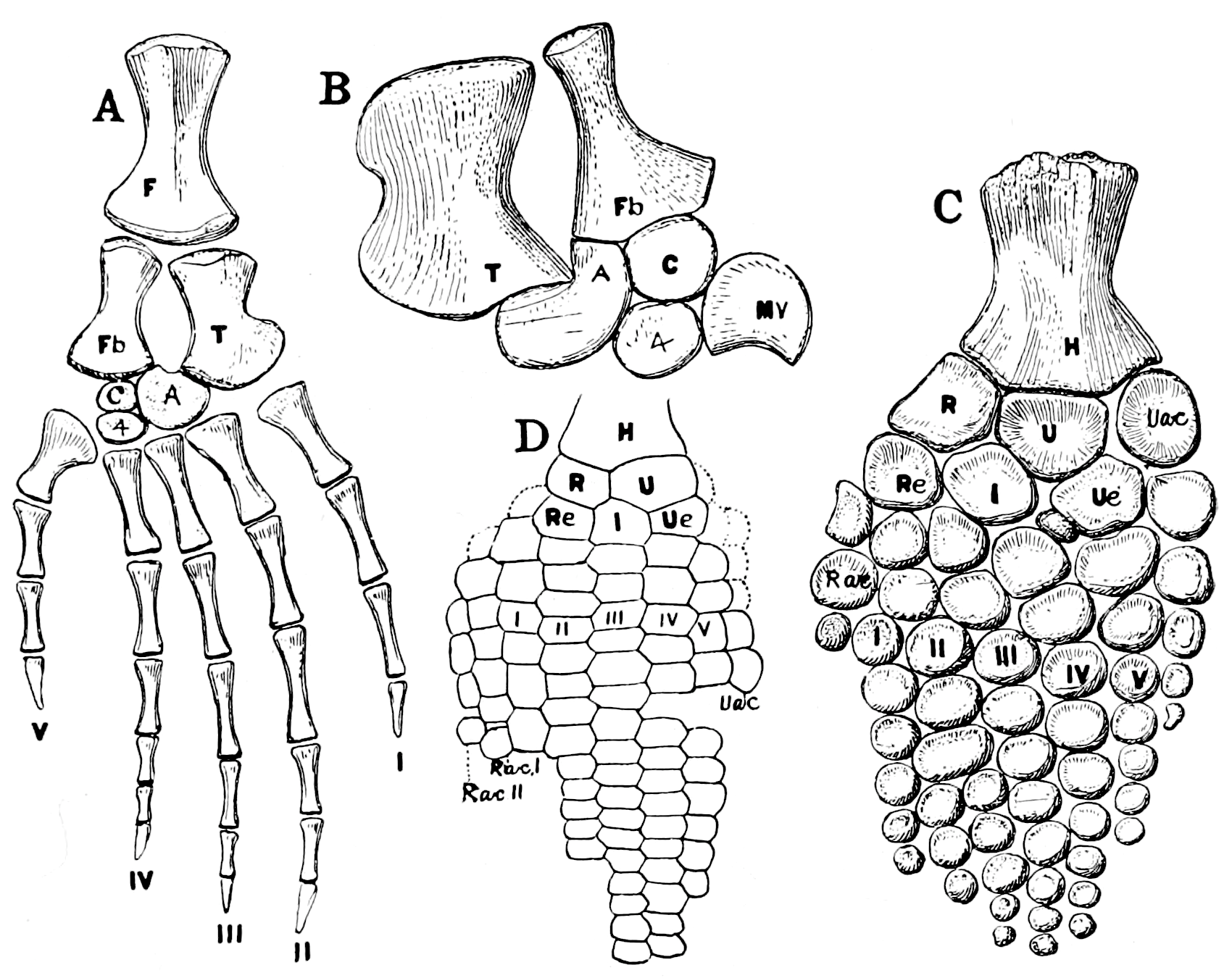
Illustration of limbs of aquatic reptiles: the mosasaurs Platecarpus and Clidastes, and the ichthyosaurs Ophthalmosaurus and Platypterygius. From The Osteology of the Reptiles (1925)

Cetaceans are the sole mammals to have evolved hyperphalangy. Though the flippers of modern cetaceans are not correctly described as webbed feet, the intermediate webbed limbs of ancient semiaquatic cetaceans may be described as such. The presence of interdigital webbing within the fossils of semi-aquatic Eocene cetaceans was probably the result of BMP antagonists counteracting interdigital apoptosis during embryonic limb development. Modifications to signals in these tissues likely contributed to the origin of an early form of hyperphalangy in fully aquatic cetaceans about 35 million years ago. The process continued over time, and a very derived form of hyperphalangy, with six or more phalanges per digit, evolved convergently in rorqual whales and oceanic dolphins, and was likely associated with another wave of signaling within the interdigital tissues.

Although toothed cetaceans have five digits, most baleen whales have four digits and even lack a metacarpal. In the latter (mysticetes), the first digit ray may have been lost as late as 14 million years ago.

=== Flipper evolution in turtles ===
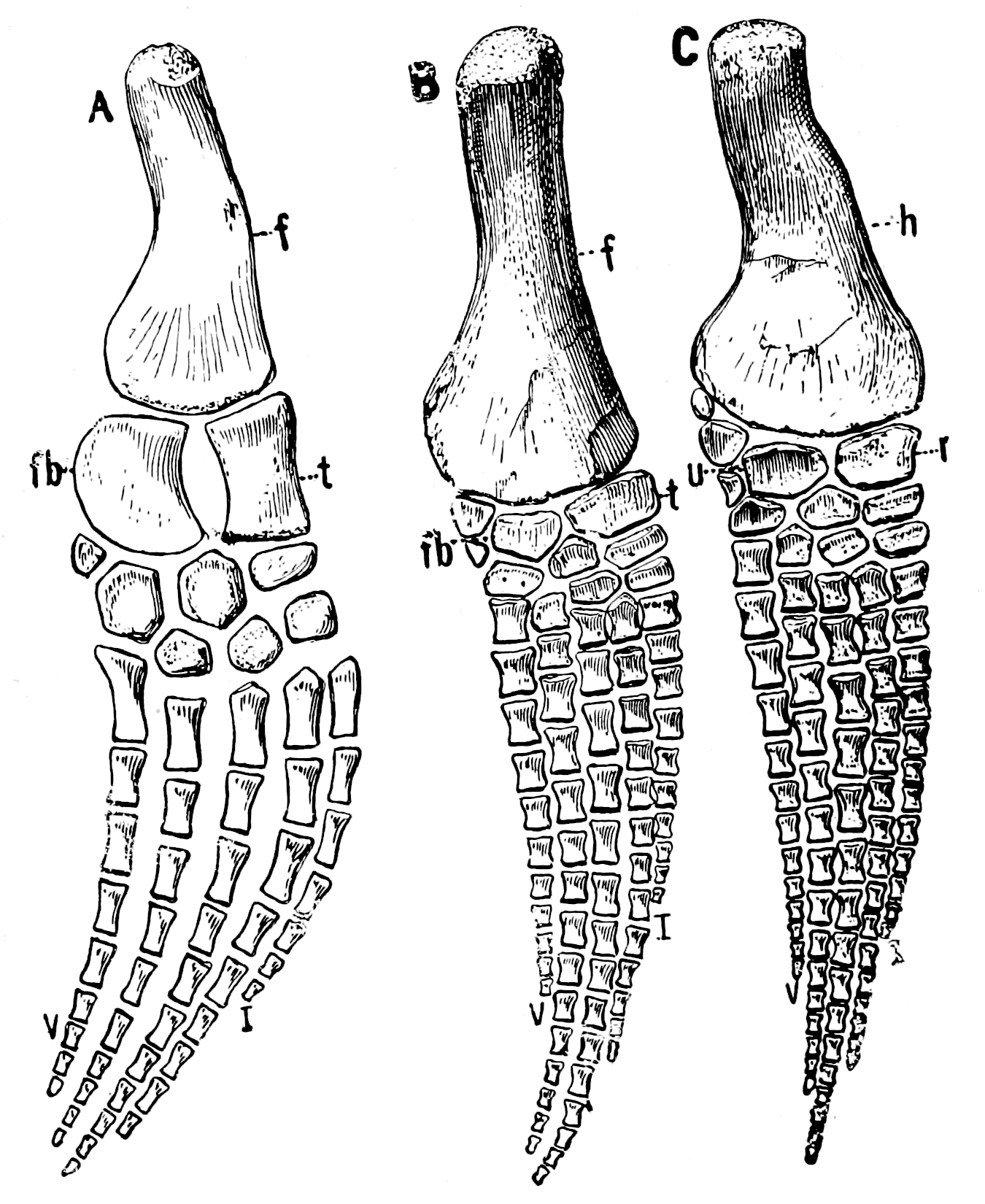
Illustration of plesiosaur flippers. Meyerasaurus and Trinacromerum. From The Osteology of the Reptiles (1925)

Sea turtles evolved in the Cretaceous. Their flippers developed gradually by a series of stepwise adaptations, with the most fundamental traits of flippers appearing in the deepest nodes (the earliest times) in their phylogeny. These initial traits evolved only once among chelonioids, and the bauplan was refined through a secondary process of specialization.

Evers et al. identified characters related to the pectoral girdle and forelimb that are related to the modification of sea turtle arms and hands into flippers.

Key biomechanical features of flippers

- flattening of elements
- lengthening of the humerus
- reduction of mobility between individual flipper elements

Fundamental traits for flipper movement

- lateral position of the humeral process
- change in the angle of the internal scapula

== Foraging behavior ==
Because of the specialization of flippers and their hydrodynamic constraints, it was thought that they were not used to significantly interact with the environment, unlike the legs of terrestrial tetrapods. However, the use of limbs for foraging is documented in marine tetrapods. Use of the flippers for foraging behavior is observed in marine mammals such as walruses, seals, and manatee, and even in reptiles such as sea turtles. Among turtles, observed behaviors include a green turtle holding a jellyfish, a loggerhead rolling a scallop on the sea floor, and a hawksbill turtle pushing against a reef for leverage to rip an anemone loose. Based on presumed limb use in ancestral turtles, these behaviors may have occurred as long ago as 70 million years.

== See also ==
- Fish fin
- Homology (biology)
