= Eight (rowing) =

Boat class used in competitive rowing

Eight icon

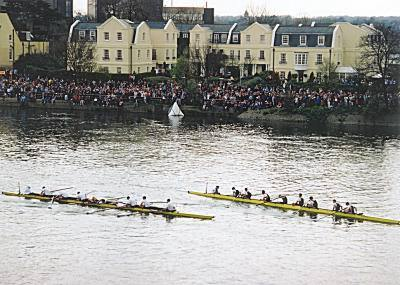
Eights at the end of the 2002 Oxford and Cambridge Boat Race

An eight, abbreviated as an 8+, is a racing shell used in competitive rowing (crew). It is designed for eight rowers, who propel the boat with sweep oars, and is steered by a coxswain, or "cox".

Each of the eight rowers has one oar. The rowers sit in a line in the centre of the boat and face the stern. They are usually placed alternately, with four on the port side (rower's right hand side – also traditionally known as "stroke side") and four on the starboard side (rower's lefthand side – known as "bow side"). The cox steers the boat using a rudder and is normally seated at the stern of the boat. Because of the size, weight, and speed of the boat in comparison to the 4+ and 2+, it is generally considered unsafe to race the 8+ coxless or to have a bowloader cox.

Coxed eight on the River Severn at Worcester

Racing boats (often called "shells") are long, narrow, and broadly semi-circular in cross-section in order to reduce drag to a minimum. Originally made from wood, shells are now almost always made from a composite material (usually carbon-fibre reinforced plastic) for strength and weight advantages. Eights have a fin towards the rear, to help prevent roll and yaw and to help the rudder. The riggers are staggered alternately along the boat so that the forces apply asymmetrically to each side of the boat. If the boat is sculled by rowers each with two oars the combination is referred to as an octuple scull. In a scull boat, the riggers apply forces symmetrically. A sweep oared boat has to be stiffer to handle the unmatched forces, and so requires more bracing, which means it has to be heavier and slower than an equivalent sculling boat. However, octuple sculls are not used in main competitions.

"Eight" is one of the classes recognized by the International Rowing Federation and one of the events in the Olympics. The first Olympic eights race was held in 1900 and won by the United States.

== See also ==
- Rowing at the Summer Olympics
  - List of Olympic medalists in rowing (women)
  - List of Olympic medalists in rowing (men)
- World Rowing Championships
- Grand Challenge Cup
- The Boat Race
