= Coxless four =

Boat class used in competitive rowing

Coxless four icon

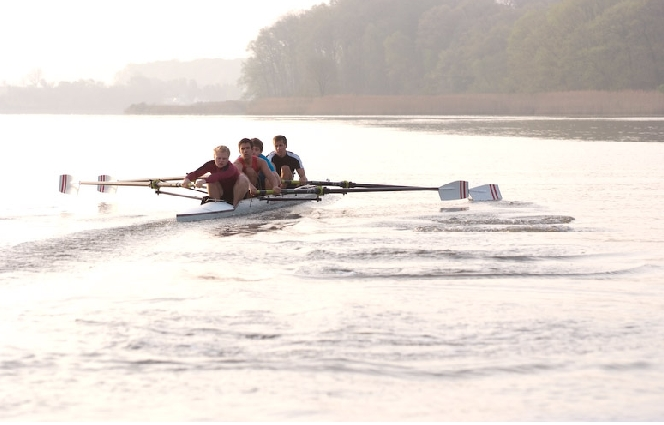
A Washington College crew in a coxless four

A coxless four, abbreviated as a 4- and also called a straight four, is a racing shell used in the sport of competitive rowing. It is designed for four persons who propel the boat with sweep oars, without a coxswain.

The crew consists of four rowers, each having one oar. There are two rowers on the stroke side (rower's right hand side) and two on the bow side (rower's lefthand side). As there is no coxswain, the rudder is controlled by one of the crew, normally with the rudder cable attached to the toe of one of their shoes which can pivot about the ball of the foot, moving the cable left or right. The steersman may row at bow, who has the best vision when looking over their shoulder, or on straighter courses stroke may steer, since they can point the stern of the boat at some landmark at the start of the course. The equivalent boat when it is steered by a coxswain is called a "coxed four".

Racing boats (often called "shells") are long, narrow, and broadly semi-circular in cross-section with gradual tapers, causing little drag. Originally made from wood, shells are now typically made from a composite material, usually carbon fiber reinforced polymer, for strength and weight advantages. Fours have a fin near the stern, to help prevent roll and yaw and to help the rudder. The riggers are staggered alternately along the boat so that the forces apply asymmetrically to each side of the boat. A sweep-oared boat has to be stiffer to handle the unmatched forces, and so requires more bracing, thus slightly heavier, inside, than a boat optimally designed (instead) for sculling.

"Coxless four" is one of the classes recognized by the International Rowing Federation and an Olympic event for men and women. Between 1996 and 2016 it was also an Olympic event for lightweight men.

In 1868, Walter Bradford Woodgate rowing a Brasenose coxed four arranged for his coxswain to jump overboard at the start of the Stewards' Challenge Cup at Henley Royal Regatta to lighten the boat. The unwanted cox narrowly escaped strangulation by the water lilies, but Woodgate and his homemade steering device triumphed by 100 yards and were promptly disqualified. This led to the adoption of Henley Regatta rules specifically prohibiting such conduct and a special prize for four-oared crews without coxswains was offered at the regatta in 1869. However, in 1873 the Steward's cup was changed to coxless fours, supplementing the Wyfold.

== Quad sculls ==
If the boat is sculled by rowers, each with two oars, the combination is called a quad scull. In that boat the riggers apply forces symmetrically. However most rowing clubs cannot afford to have a four-seat quad-only format delicate boat, which might be rarely used and instead generally opt for versatility in their fleet by using stronger "standard, versatile" shells to be rigged as either boat. Aside from the structural strength, crossways, boats rigged for either format or sweep-oar use tend to have larger mountings/fixings for their riggers than classic, sculling-only vessels.

== See also ==
- Rowing at the Summer Olympics
- World Rowing Championships
