= Steller sea lion =

Steller sea lion Temporal range: Early Pleistocene – present (~800,000–0 YBP)
- E. j. monteriensis females Tofino, Vancouver Island

Conservation status
- Near Threatened (IUCN 3.1)

- Vulnerable (NatureServe)

Scientific classification
- Kingdom: Animalia
- Phylum: Chordata
- Class: Mammalia
- Order: Carnivora
- Parvorder: Pinnipedia
- Family: Otariidae
- Genus: Eumetopias; Gill, 1866
- Species: E. jubatus

Binomial name
- Eumetopias jubatus (Schreber, 1776)
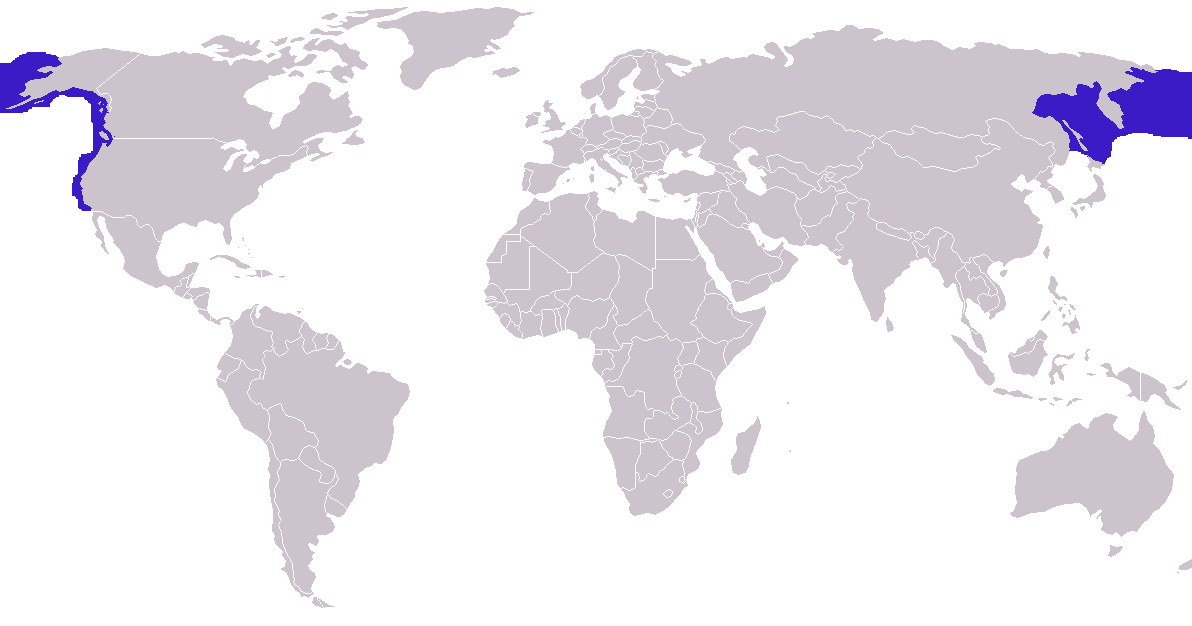
- Global distribution

Species of carnivore

The Steller sea lion (Eumetopias jubatus), also known as Steller's sea lion or the northern sea lion, is a large, near-threatened species of sea lion, predominantly found in the coastal marine habitats of the northeast Pacific Ocean and the Pacific Northwest regions of North America, from north-central California to Oregon, Washington and British Columbia to Alaska. Its range continues across the Northern Pacific and the Aleutian Islands, all the way to Kamchatka, Magadan Oblast, and the Sea of Okhotsk, south to Honshu's northern coastline. It is the sole member of the genus Eumetopias, and the largest of the so-called eared seals (Otariidae). Among pinnipeds, only the walrus and the two species of elephant seal are bigger. The species is named for the naturalist and explorer Georg Wilhelm Steller, who first described them in 1741. Steller sea lions have attracted considerable attention in recent decades, both from scientists and the general public, due to significant (and largely unexplained) declines in their numbers over an extensive portion of their northern range, notably in Alaska.

== Description ==
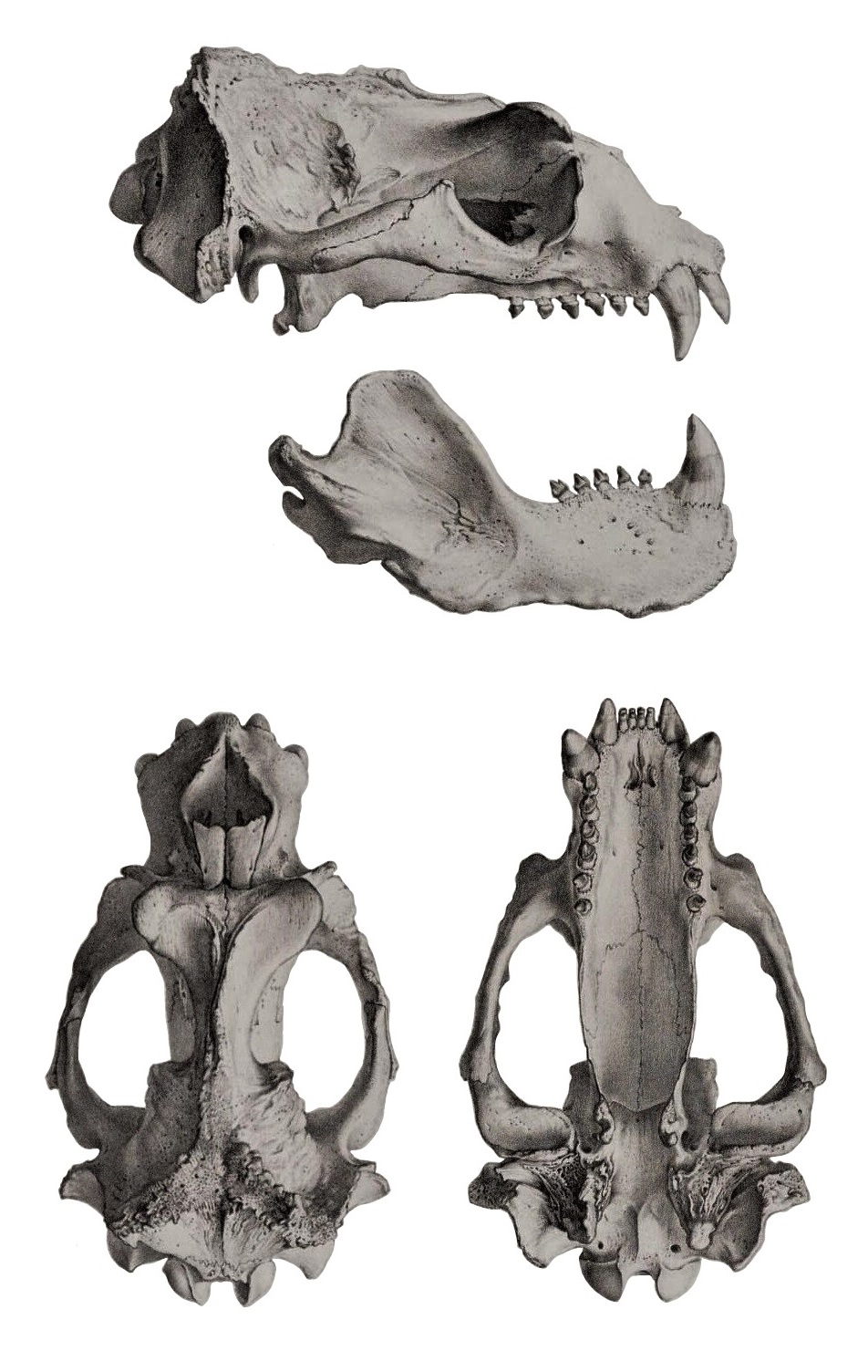
Skull

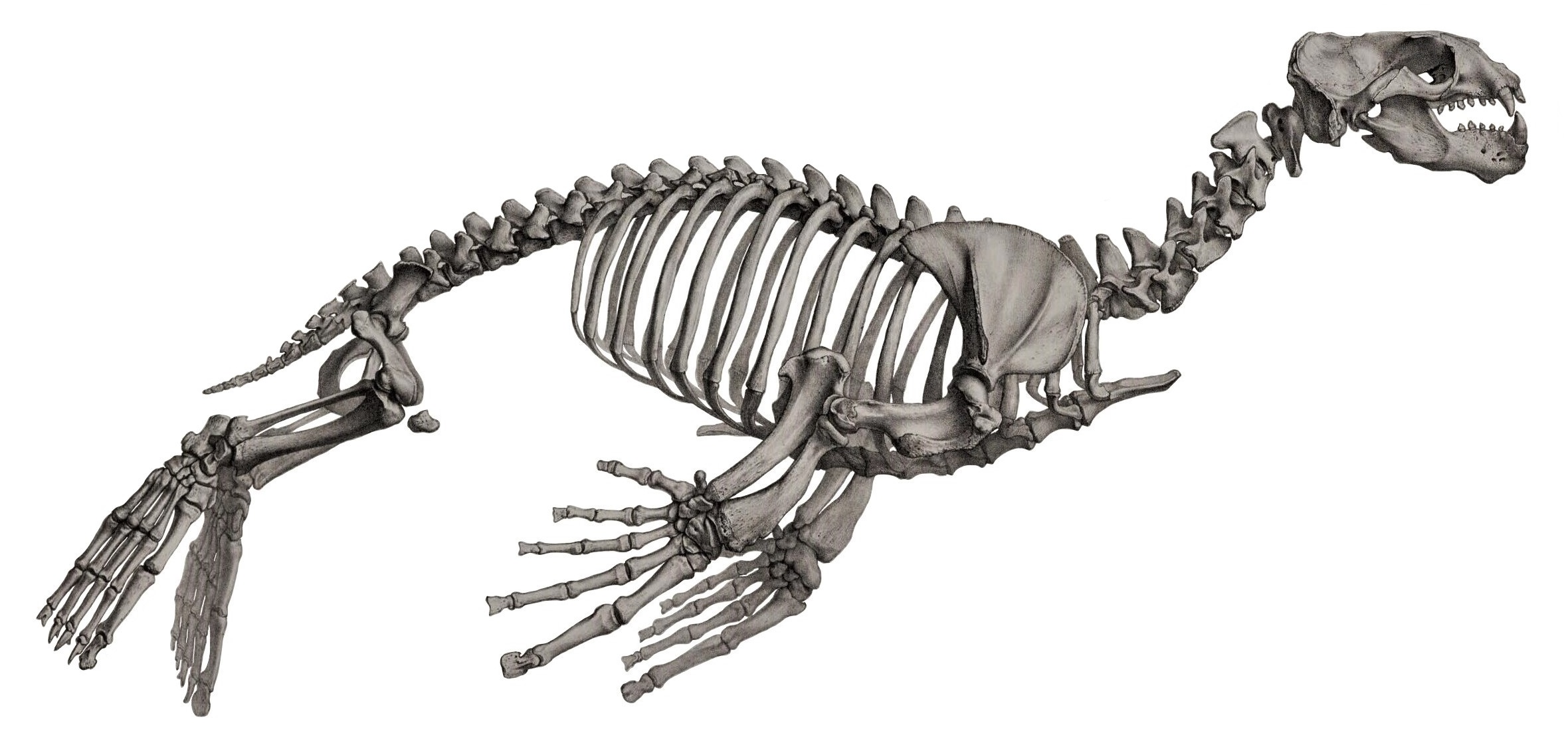
Skeleton

Adult animals are lighter in color than most sea lions, ranging from pale yellow to tawny and occasionally reddish. Steller sea lion pups are born almost black, weighing around 23 kg (51 lb), and remain dark in coloration for several months. Females reach sexual maturity between four and six years of age, while males have a wider window, reaching maturity between three and eight years of age. Females and males both grow rapidly until the fifth year, after which female growth slows considerably. Adult females measure 2.3–2.9 m (7.5–9.5 ft) in length, on average being 2.5 m (8.2 ft), and weigh 240–350 kg (530–770 lb), with an average of 263 kg (580 lb). Males continue to grow until their secondary sexual traits appear in their fifth to eighth year. Males are slightly longer than the females, growing to about 2.82–3.25 m (9.3–10.7 ft) long and averaging 3 m (9.8 ft) in length. Males have much wider chests, necks, and general forebody structure. Males can weigh between 450–1,120 kg (990–2,470 lb), weighing on average 544 kg (1,199 lb). Males are further distinguished from females by broader and higher foreheads, flatter snouts, and a thick mane of coarse hair around their large necks. Their Latin name translates roughly as "maned one with the broad forehead".

== Range ==
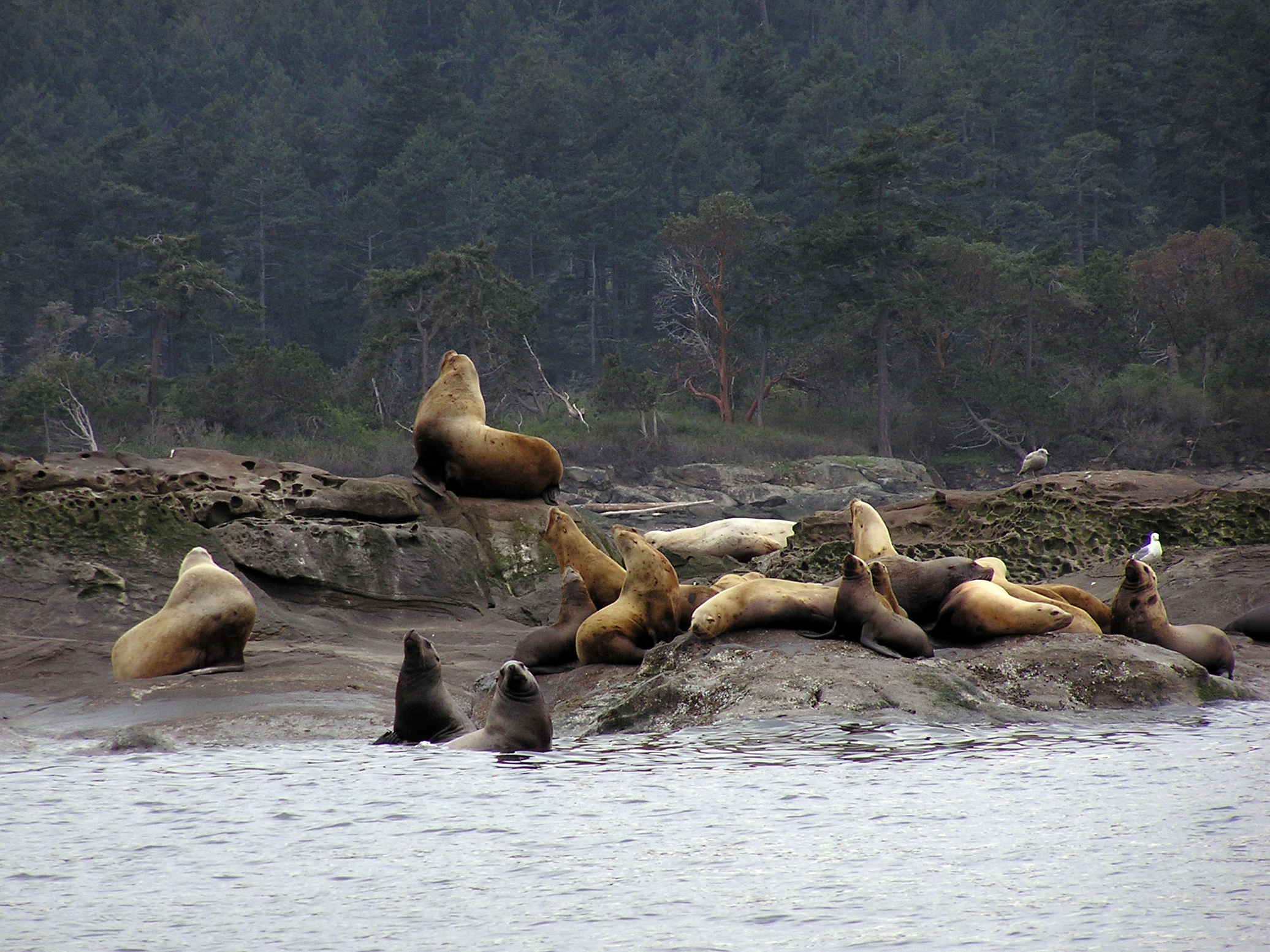
Steller sea lions congregate on rocks in the Gulf Islands of British Columbia, Canada.

The range of the Steller sea lion extends from the north shore of Honshu in Japan to the Gulf of Alaska in the north, down to Año Nuevo Island off the coast of central California and Oregon to the south. They formerly bred as far south as the Channel Islands, but have not been observed there since the 1980s. Based on genetic anаlyses and local migration patterns, the global Steller sea lion population has traditionally been divided into an eastern and western stock at 144°W longitude, roughly through the middle of the Gulf of Alaska. Recent evidence suggests the sea lions in Russia in the Sea of Okhotsk and the Kuril Islands comprise a third Asian stock, while the sea lions on the eastern seaboard of Kamchatka and the Commander Islands belong to the western stock.

In the summer, Steller sea lions tend to shift their range somewhat southward. Therefore, though there are no reproductive rookeries in Japan, several consistent haul-out sites are found around Hokkaidō in the winter and spring. Vagrants have been spotted in the Yellow Sea and Bohai Gulf and along the coast of the Korean Peninsula and China. The oldest fossil known of the species was found near Kanazawa, Japan and dates to the late Early Pleistocene, approximately 800,000 years ago.

== Ecology ==
=== Habitat ===
Steller sea lions tend to live in the coastal waters of the subarctic because of the cooler temperate climate of the area. Like all otariids, Steller sea lions are amphibious and spend some time in water and some on land. Typically, Steller sea lions spend their time in the water feeding but haul-out onto land to reproduce, raise their pups, molt, and rest. Steller sea lions usually congregate on isolated islands because they are the ideal terrestrial habitat. These isolated islands are preferred by Steller sea lions because they can avoid predation from terrestrial predators, easily thermoregulate (by means of cooling winds), and access offshore prey more easily. Some haul-out sites, known as rookeries, are commonly used for reproduction while other haul-out sites are used for other purposes like molting. However, both biotic and abiotic factors can influence the amount of time that Steller sea lions spend on land. Haul-out sites and haul-out abundance of the Steller sea lion can be determined by prey availability, predator abundance, tide levels, weather, etc.

=== Foraging ===
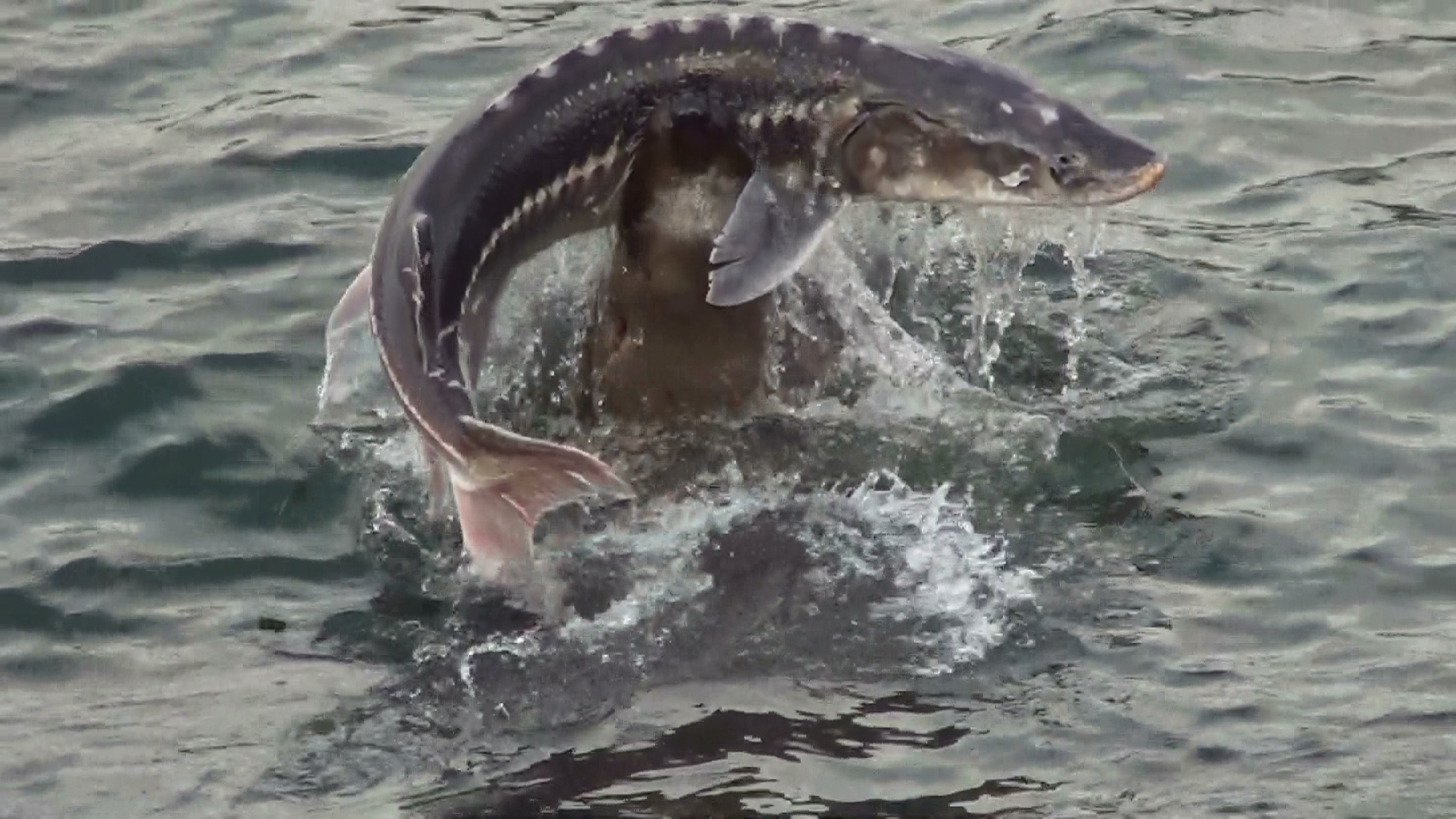
Sea lion with white sturgeon

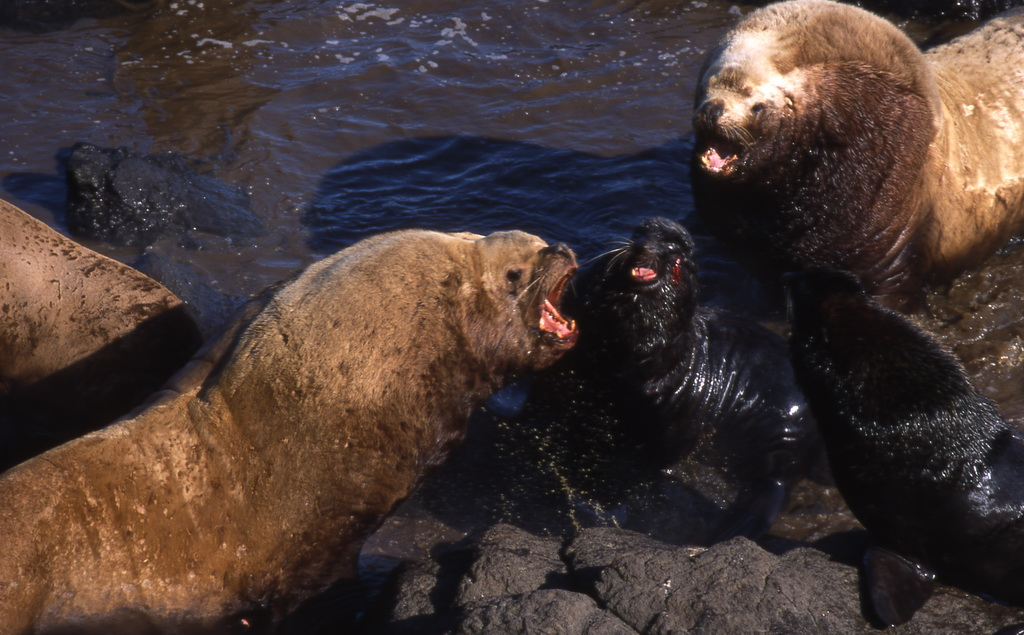
Fighting with Northern fur seals

Steller sea lions are skilled and opportunistic marine predators, feeding on a wide range of fish and cephalopod species. Important diet components include walleye pollock, Atka mackerel, halibut, herring, capelin, flatfish Pacific cod, rockfish, sculpins, Pacific salmon, sand lance, and cephalopods such as various squid and octopus, as well as bivalves and gastropods. They seem to prefer schooling fish and forage primarily between intertidal zones and continental shelves. They usually aggregate in groups of up to twelve in areas of prey abundance. They are known to aggregate near fishing vessels, preying on bycatch discards. Most of the data on their foraging comes from data collected off the coast of Alaska; little is known of their foraging behavior elsewhere.

The composition of the diet of Steller sea lions varies seasonally and geographically; as opportunistic predators, they concentrate on the locally most abundant prey species. In addition to their primary marine environment, they sometimes enter estuaries and feed on brackish-water fish such as sturgeon. Very occasionally, they have been known to prey on northern fur seals, ringed seals, harbor seals, and sea otter pups. Records suggest that the range of their prey species has broadened over time.

=== Predation ===
Steller sea lions are top-tier carnivores, but are susceptible to predation, primarily by killer whales. Shark species are also possible predators: Pacific sleeper sharks, salmon sharks and great white sharks may prey on juvenile sea lions.

== Behavior and life history ==
=== Reproduction ===
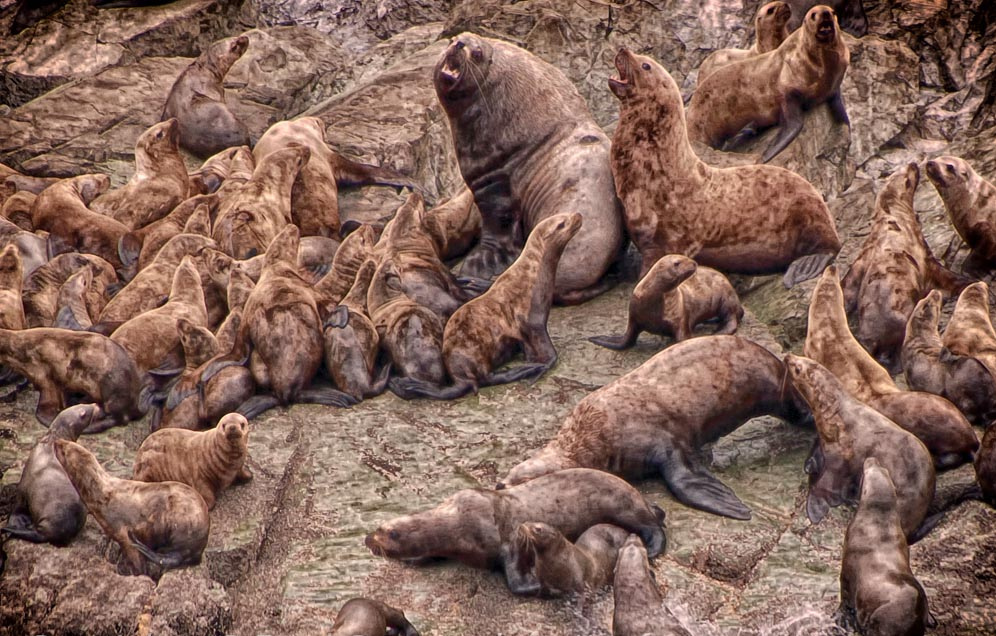
Adult bull, females, and pups near Juneau, Alaska, US

Reproductively mature male sea lions gather together mid-spring on traditional, well-defined reproductive rookeries, usually on beaches on isolated islands. The larger, older males establish and defend distinct territories on the rookery. A week or so later, adult females arrive, accompanied occasionally by sexually immature offspring, and form fluid aggregations throughout the rookery. Like all other otariids, Steller sea lions are polygynous. However, unlike some other species, they do not coerce individual females into harems, but control spatial territories among which females freely move. Steller sea lions have used aquatic, semiaquatic, and terrestrial territories. Males with semiaquatic territories have the most success in defending them. The boundaries are defined by natural features, such as rocks, faults, or ridges in rocks, and territories can remain stable for 60 days. Though Steller sea lion males are generally tolerant of pups, one male filmed on Medny Island in Russia was documented killing and eating several pups in a first-ever recorded incident of cannibalism. Though researchers are uncertain as to the motives or reasons behind said attacks, it is suggested that the bull involved may have an abnormal personality akin to being psychotic.

Pregnant females give birth soon after arriving on a rookery, and copulation generally occurs one to two weeks after giving birth, but the fertilized egg does not become implanted in the uterus until the fall. A fertilized egg may remain in embryonic diapause for up to three months before implanting and beginning to divide. Twins are rare. After a week or so of nursing without leaving the rookery, females begin to take progressively longer and more frequent foraging trips leaving their pups behind until at some point in late summer, when both the mother and pup leave the rookery together. This maternal attendance pattern is common in otariids. As pups get older the amount of time spent by females foraging out at sea increases. This continues until pups obtain the ideal body weight and energy reserves to eat on their own. A study conducted by the University of California, Santa Cruz found that on average male pups consume more milk than females. This may be due to the sexual dimorphism common to otariids. Reproductive males fast throughout the reproductive season, often without entering the water once from mid-May until August, when the structure of the reproductive rookeries begins to fall apart and most animals leave for the open seas and disperse throughout their range.

Steller sea lion pup on Antsiferov Island in the Kuril Islands, Russia

The age at weaning is highly variable; pups may remain with their mothers for as long as four years. Incidents of mothers feeding daughters that are simultaneously feeding their own newborn pups have been documented, which is an extremely rare occurrence among mammals. A study done at Año Nuevo in 1983 found that female attendance and time spent with their pup was shaped by increasing nutritional demands of the pup and the pups suckling efficiency. Females averaged 21 hours ashore and 36 hours at sea. As the pups aged, females began to spend more time at sea again. As the pups matured, specifically at the sixth week past birth, the mother's sea time declined by 30 percent. There was no relationship between the pups' activity or physical excursion and their suckling time, age, or sex. Their suckling time, and age, and sex are unrelated to their use of energy. Labeled water studies showed that the pups' milk intake had a direct relationship to their size. Pups that consumed more milk were heavier than those that did not. These findings show that the amount of time females spend onshore with their pups is based on their pup's suckling efficiency and nutritional demands.

In the past, the low pup production has been tied to an increase in nutritional stress found in females. This was believed to have contributed to the decline in Steller sea lions common to Alaska.

=== Locomotion ===
The largest of the eared seals, Steller sea lions are quick swimmers, about as fast as the smaller California sea lions. Glide velocity of individual Steller sea lions has been measured as 2.9–3.4 meters or 1.2–1.5 body lengths per second, which is close to the optimal swim velocity of 1.4 body lengths per second based on the minimum cost of transport for California sea lions.

A 2007 study of Steller sea lions found that a majority of thrust was produced during the drive phase of the fore flipper stroke cycle. Although previous findings on eared seals suggested that thrust was generated by the initial outward movement of the foreflippers or the terminal drag-based paddling phase, the 2007 study found that little or no thrust was generated during those phases. Swimming performance in sea lions is modulated by changes in the duration and intensity of movements without changing their sequence. Using criteria based on velocity and the minimum radius of turns, Steller sea lions' maneuverability is similar to that of other eared seals, superior to that of cetaceans, and inferior to that of many fish.

=== Diving ===
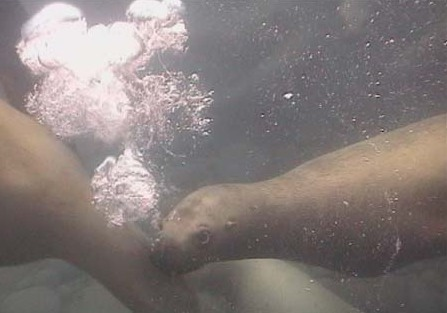
Sea lion releasing air underwater

To be able to dive for a long period of time, Steller sea lions exhibit apnea, bradycardia, and peripheral vasoconstriction. This allows them to maximize their oxygen stores and efficiently forage during their dives. In addition to those adaptations, their thick blubber layer and outer fur layer keep their body insulated during dives.

Trained Steller sea lions from Vancouver Aquarium were placed in the open ocean at the University of British Columbia's Open Water Research Station to study their diving metabolism and behavior. Steller sea lions' dives are more energetically costly if they perform dive bouts. The aerobic diving limit of Steller sea lions was observed to be affected by their nutritional state and feeding.

=== Communication ===
Like most otariids, Steller sea lions are vocal in air. Mature male sea lions have a range of vocalizations as part of their territorial behaviors, including belches, growls, snorts, and hisses that serve as warnings to others. Both males and females also produce underwater noises similar to their above water sounds, described as clicks, barks, and belches. The primary function of their vocalizations is for social behavior. Sonogram readings reported that Steller Sea Lions make discrete, low frequency pulses underwater that resemble the male "belching" territorial noise made in air. These underwater vocalizations have an average of 20–30 pulses per second.

Vocalizations are critical to mother-pup pairs, as the mothers must find their pups in a crowded breeding area when they return from foraging. The mother and pup both use distinctive calls, like names, to help differentiate themselves among the crowd of other sea lions. Their aerial vocalizations have been described as similar to the bleats of sheep, and bellows.

Because Steller sea lions are sexually dimorphic in size, their hearing differs in sensitivity, possibly due to differences in size of the hearing structures. Females have a higher sensitivity than males, perhaps to hear the higher frequency calls of their pups. The Steller sea lion's hearing range also suggests that they are capable of hearing the underwater calls of one of their main predators, the killer whale.

== Interactions with humans ==
Steller sea lion were hunted for meat and other commodities by prehistoric communities everywhere their range intersected with human communities. Aside from food and clothing, their skin was used to cover baidarkas and kayaks. A subsistence harvest on the order of 300 animals or less continues to this day in some native communities in Alaska.

Historically, the sea lion has had only very slight commercial value. For example, in the 19th century their whiskers sold for a penny apiece for use as tobacco-pipe cleaners.

Steller sea lions are sometimes killed intentionally by fishermen, as they are seen as competitors and a threat to fish stocks. Killing sea lions is strictly prohibited in the US and Russia; however, in Japan, a fixed number are still harvested annually, ostensibly to protect their fisheries. In Canada, commercial hunting is prohibited, but limited hunting permits are occasionally granted for First Nations communities, or if local culling is deemed necessary, for example, nuisance animals destroying fish farms.

In recent years, Steller sea lions have been known to enter the Columbia River estuary and feed on white sturgeon, several salmon species, and rainbow trout, some of which are also listed under the U.S. Endangered Species Act. They are found in the Columbia River nearly year round, with the exception of early summer, going as far upstream as Bonneville Dam. Though not as abundant as the California sea lion, there is still concern amongst agencies tasked with managing and monitoring the fish populations; as the Steller sea lions are, themselves, protected under the Marine Mammal Protection Act, managers are implored to use non-harmful, non-lethal deterrence methods (such as rubber bullets, bullhorns and other noisemakers). Interference or deterrence by the general public is unlawful, unregulated, and considered to be stressful (even disruptive) to the animals and their habits. Additionally, the massive size of the Steller sea lion—and potential for aggression—poses a real threat for humans; thus, the interfering with, molestation or frightening of marine mammals is strictly forbidden. Offenders are subject to varying fines, court appearances and even jail time.

In Hokkaido, Japan, its meat is used in curry and is sold as a souvenir (usually canned). In Rausu, its meat is used in dishes.

=== Recent decline and subsequent recovery ===
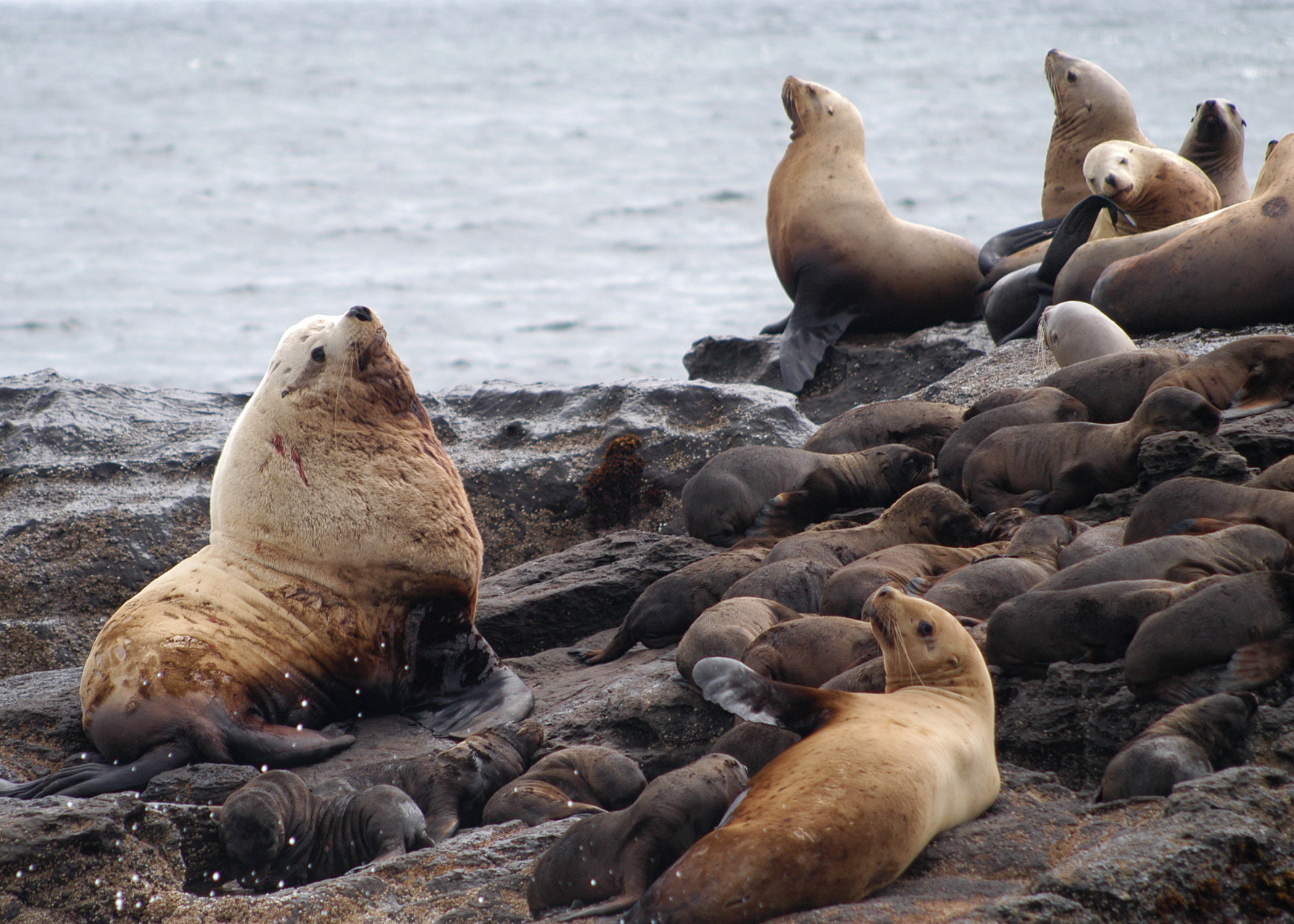
Near Rookery Rogue River

While the populations of the eastern and Asian stocks appear stable, the population of the western stock, particularly along the Aleutian Islands, was estimated to have fallen by 70–80% since the 1970s. As a consequence, in 1997 the western stock of Steller sea lions was listed as endangered and the eastern stock was listed as threatened under the United States Endangered Species Act. They have since been the object of intense study and the focus of much political and scientific debate in Alaska.

One suspected cause of their precipitous decline was the overfishing of Alaska pollock, herring, and other fish stocks in the Gulf of Alaska. This stems largely from the "junk-food hypothesis" representing a shift in their diet from fatty herring and capelin to leaner fare such as pollock and flounder, thereby limiting their ability to consume and store fat. Other hypotheses include increased predation by orcas and sharks, indirect effects of prey species composition shifts due to changes in climate, effects of disease or contaminants, shooting by fishermen, and others. The decline is certainly due to a complex of interrelated factors which have yet to be defined by the research effort.

Another possible reason for decline in this species has been tied to the nutritional stress hypothesis. The lack of prey corresponds to the decrease in population. In females specifically, obtaining an insufficient amount of nutrients has resulted in the failure to complete their pregnancies to full term.

In October 2013, the eastern Steller sea lion was taken off the U.S. Endangered Species List after a major population comeback over the past several years.

== See also ==
- Eared seal
- Chonkers
