= Octuple scull =

Racing shell used in the sport of rowing

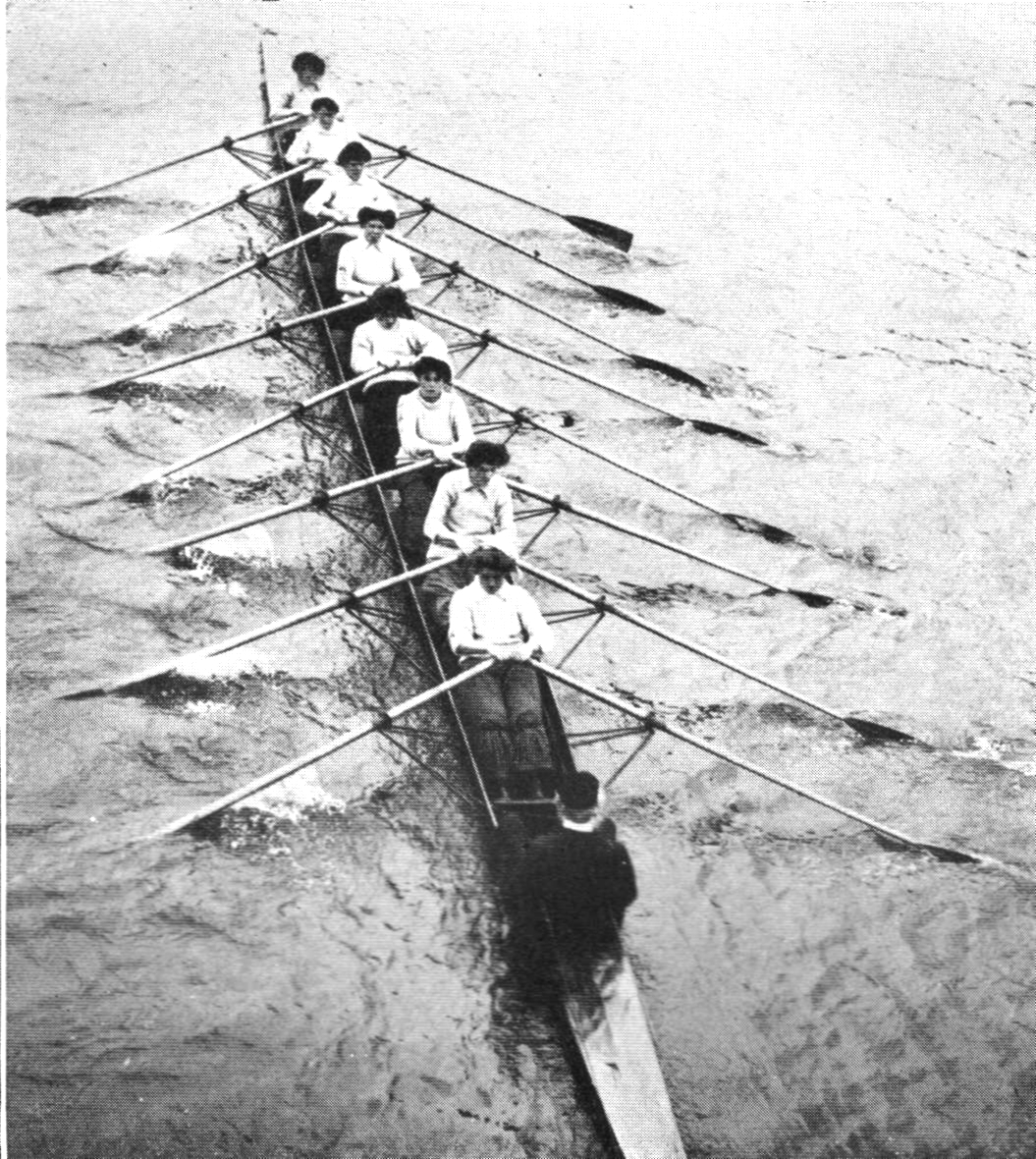
An octuple sculling shell with 16 oars, 8 rowers and a cox in 1907 (Frederick James Furnivall coxing an octuple from the then Hammersmith Sculling Club)

An octuple sculling shell, often simply called an oct and abbreviated as an 8x or 8x+, is a racing shell used in the sport of rowing.

Unlike the eight (8+), a racing shell with a crew of eight rowers and a coxswain (cox) that can be seen at the Olympic Games and the Boat Race, in which each of the eight rowers have one oar (or blade) which they pull with both arms, (Note: Rowers in eights use a rowing technique called 'sweep rowing'.) in the octuple each of the eight rowers has two oars, one in each hand and use a rowing technique called sculling. The size, weight, and speed of the shell means that, like the 8+, the oct must always have a coxswain to steer and direct the crew.

Although the octuple had earlier been used for recreational rowing in Britain, it was used competitively for the first time at the annual regatta of the National Association of Amateur Oarsmen, the predecessor of USRowing, at Baltimore in 1905. According to British Rowing, the octuple is [now] only used by the youngest juniors.

An octuple is typically 65.2 feet (19.9 meters) long and has a minimum weight of 213.85 pounds (97.00 kilograms), excluding oars.

Racing boats (often called "shells") are long, narrow, and broadly semi-circular in cross-section in order to reduce drag to a minimum. They usually have a fin towards the rear, to help prevent roll and yaw. Originally made from wood, shells are now almost always made from a composite material (usually carbon-fibre reinforced plastic) for strength and weight advantages.

The riggers in sculling apply the forces symmetrically to each side of the boat, whereas in the "eight", where each of the eight rowers pull one sweep oar, the forces are staggered alternately along opposite sides of the boat.
