= Tubercle =

Rounded outgrowth found on external or internal organs of plants or animals

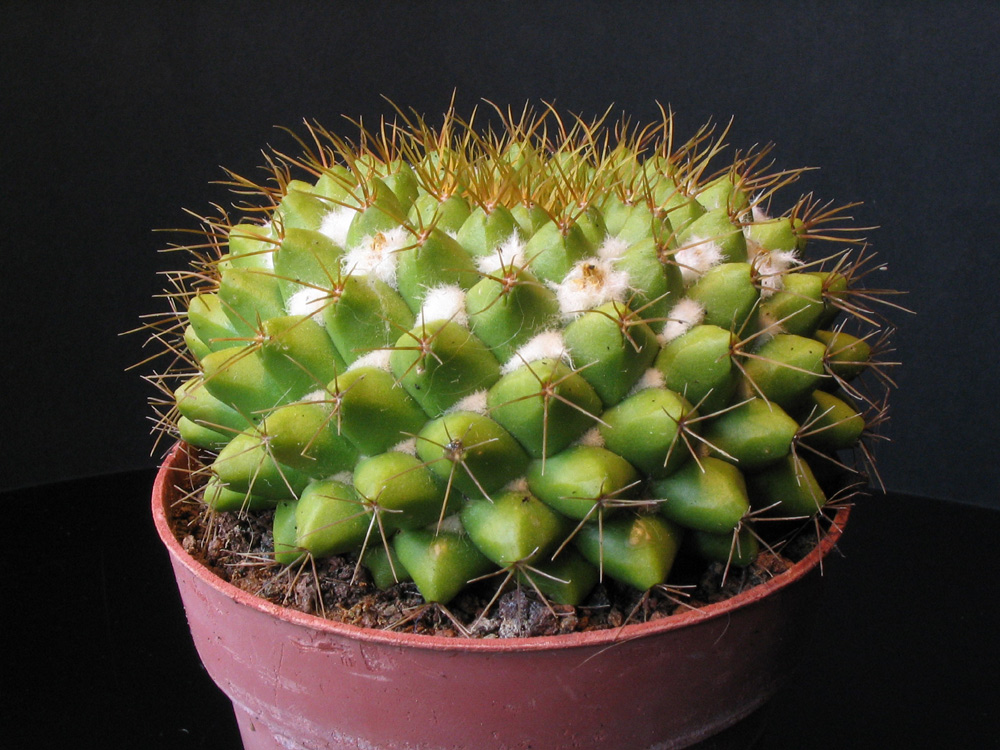
This view of the cactus Mammillaria marksiana shows its pattern of prominent tubercles, with the spines emanating from each tubercle's tip.

In anatomy, a tubercle (literally 'small tuber', Latin for 'lump') is any round nodule, small eminence, or warty outgrowth found on external or internal organs of a plant or an animal.

== In plants ==
A tubercle is generally a wart-like projection, but it has slightly different meaning depending on which family of plants or animals it is used to refer to.

In the case of certain orchids and cacti, it denotes a round nodule, small eminence, or warty outgrowth found on the lip. They are also known as podaria (singular podarium). When referring to some members of the pea family, it is used to refer to the wart-like excrescences that are found on the roots.

== In fungi ==
In mycology, a tubercle is used to refer to a mass of hyphae from which a mushroom is made.

== In animals ==
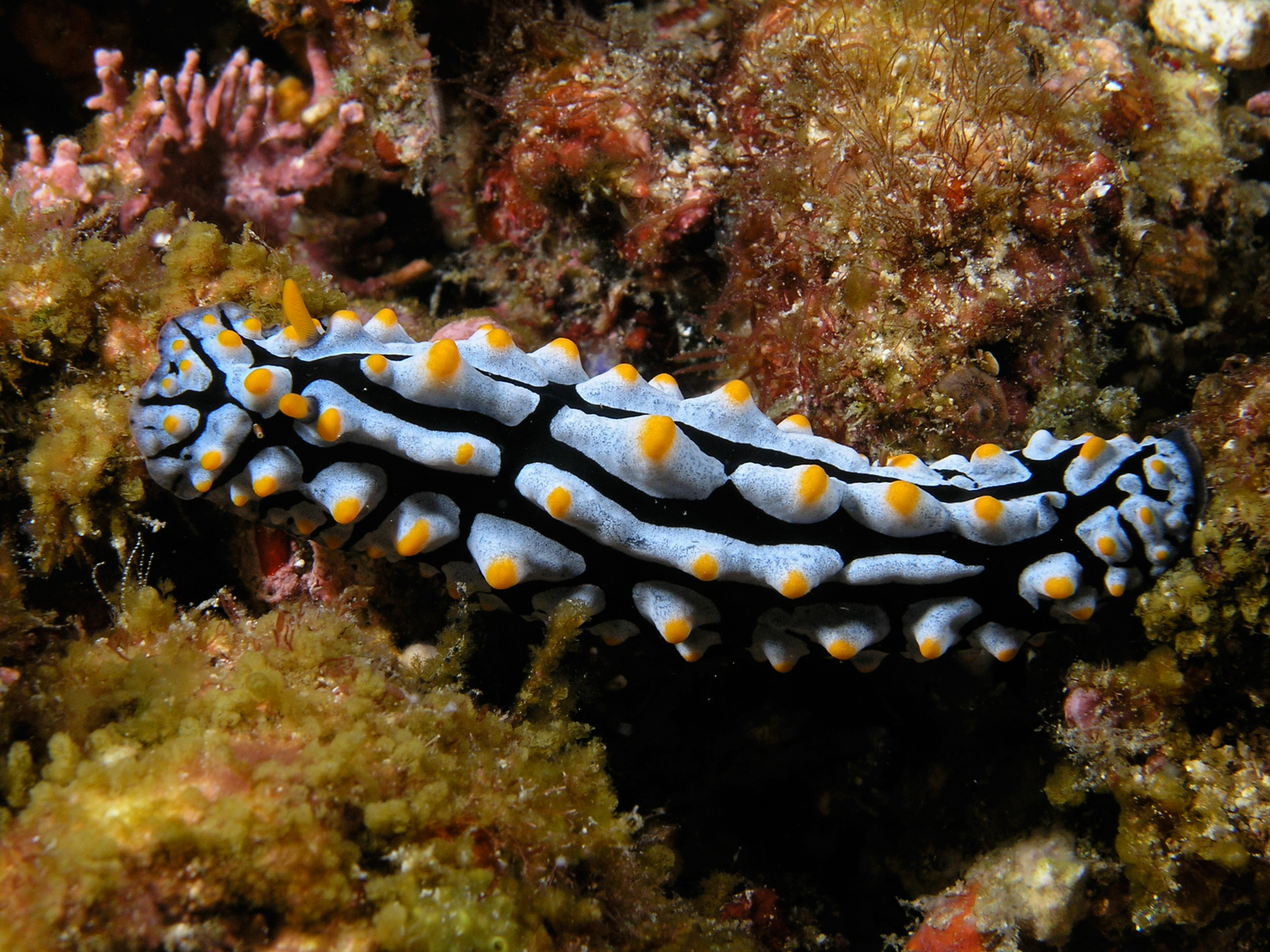
Nudibranch Phyllidia varicosa, clearly showing the yellow tubercles on the dorsum

When it is used in relation to certain dorid nudibranchs such as Peltodoris nobilis, it means the nodules on the dorsum of the animal. The tubercles in nudibranchs can present themselves in different ways: each tubercle in a single, rounded, conical or angular form; in a compound form of two or more levels; tubercles in amalgamated clusters; or as tubercles forming, or joined by a ridge.

Tubercles found on the leading edge of humpback whales' flippers were demonstrated to improve fluid flow over the flipper's surface, exhibiting the tubercle effect of fluid dynamics.

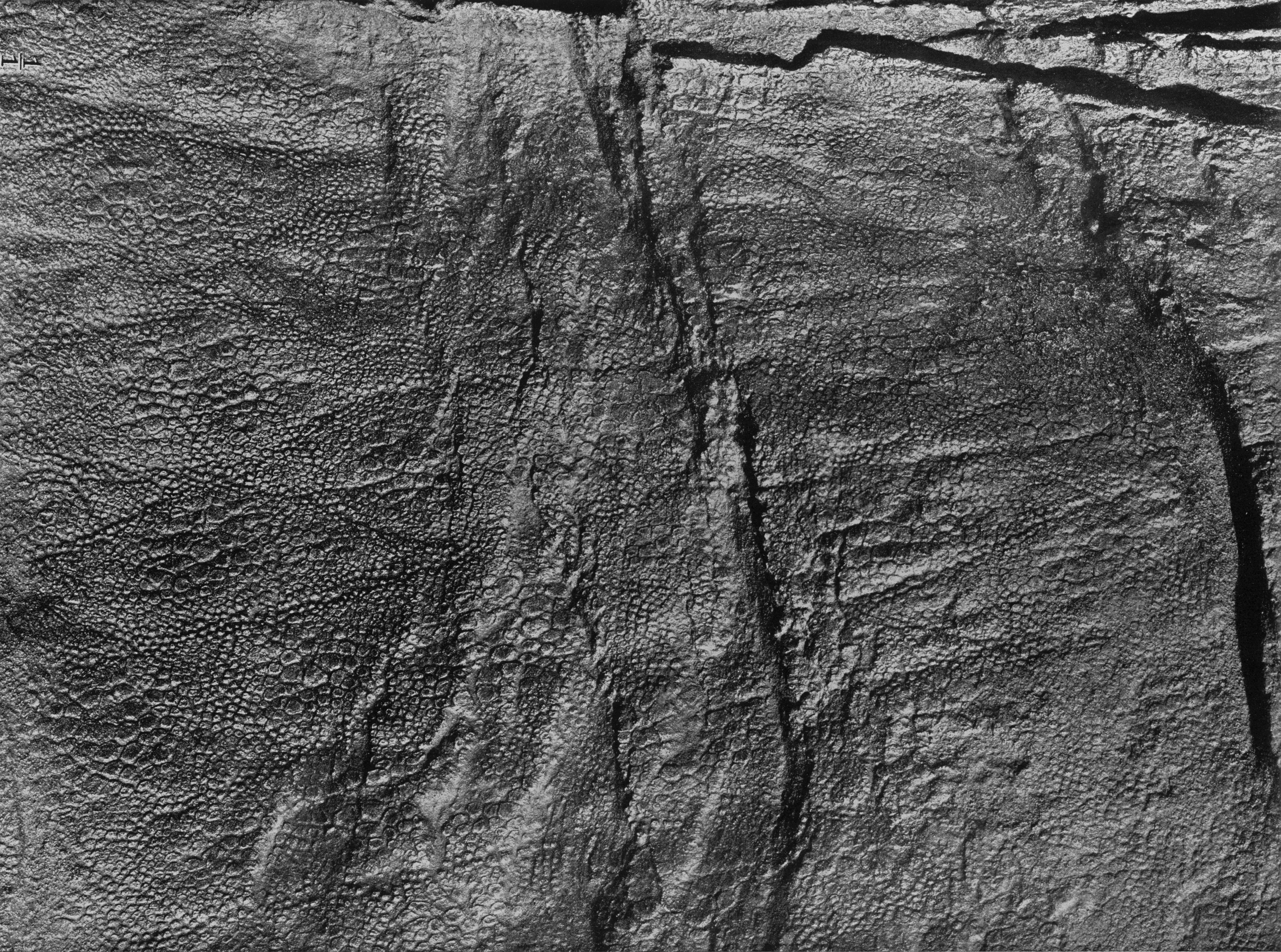
Skin impression from the abdomen of the duck-billed dinosaur Edmontosaurus annectens, showing tubercular scales

In dinosaurs, a tubercle is a general term for the scales seen in skin impressions. In duck-billed dinosaurs, for example, three main types of tubercles are defined: small tubercles with no definite arrangement (ground tubercles); larger, polygonal tubercles (pavement tubercles) up to 1 cm (0.39 in) in diameter, which are grouped into clusters separated by ground tubercles; and limpet-shaped conical scutes.

In fish, nuptial tubercles are formed on males for breeding. Nuptial pads on frogs also comprise keratinised tubercles.

== In humans ==
Within the human body, there are numerous sites where tubercles develop. On bones, they are usually eminences used for muscle connections. Larger tubercles are also known as tuberosities.

=== Mouth ===
Tubercles are usually found behind the last molar in the upper jaw, covered by the gum. Surgery can be done to make tubercles less prominent.

=== Bones ===
In the human skeleton, a tubercle or tuberosity is a protrusion that serves as an attachment for skeletal muscles. The muscles attach by tendons, where the enthesis is the connective tissue between the tendon and bone. For example, the tibial tuberosity creates an attachment point for the ligamentum patellae, or patellar ligament.

=== Lungs ===
Tubercles are nodules that contain caseous necrosis, which form in the lungs as a result of an infection with Mycobacterium tuberculosis in the patients with tuberculosis. Granulomas form in the infected tissue and undergo necrosis in the centre. Tubercles are also known as tuberculous nodules, or tuberculomas. The affected parts develop lesions in the form of small nodules called tubercles, from which the disease gets its name.

=== Ears ===
Around the sixth week of gestation, six swellings of tissue, called the hillocks of His, (Note: Named after Wilhelm His Sr. who first described them in 1855.) arise around the area that will form the ear canal. These eventually coalesce to form the outer ear. Darwin's tubercle is a minor malformation of the junction of the fourth and fifth hillocks of His. It is found in a substantial minority of people and takes the form of a cartilaginous node or bump on the rim of their outer ear, which is thought to be the vestige of a joint that allowed the top part of the ancestral ear to swivel or flop down over the opening to the ear.

=== Genitals ===
The genital tubercle is a small bump that eventually develops into a penis or a clitoris on a human fetus.

=== Brain ===
The septotubercular tract can be found in the human, as well as in the sheep brain. It is found nearby the septohypothalamic tract. Its function to the brain is ambiguous at this point.

Also, the tuberculum sellae is found at the base of the skull, which holds the hypophysis.

== See also ==
- Areolar glands, sebaceous glands surrounding the nipple
