= Chonkers =

Steller sea lion

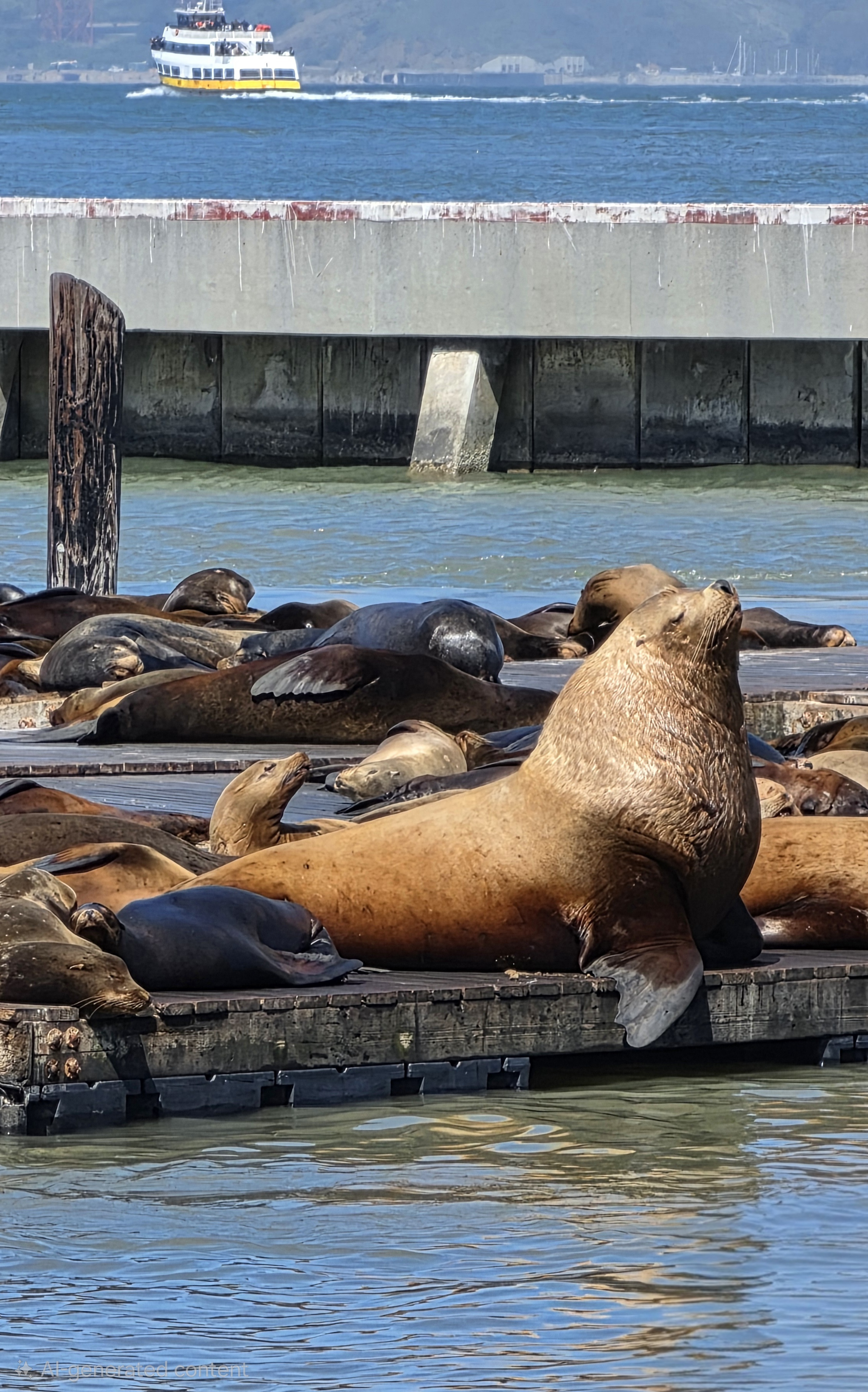
- Chonkers at Pier 39 in April 2026
- Species: Eumetopias jubatus
- Sex: Male
- Weight: approximately 2,000 lb (910 kg)

Chonkers is a Steller sea lion known for his enormous size at 2,000 pounds, as well for his appearance at Pier 39 in San Francisco, California in 2026.

== History ==
The Pier 39 Harbor Master Sheila Chandor said that Chonkers had been an occasional visitor to the pier but his visits usually only lasted a few days, with his last appearance occurring in 2024.

However, in March 2026, he arrived with a juvenile Steller sea lion though the younger one left after a few days. He remained at the pier for over a month and gained more popular attention as people noticed he was "about three times the size of the California sea lions that typically inhabit the San Francisco Bay...when he crashes his mighty frame down on the dock he's chosen to sleep on, it sounds like an oak tree falling down." Chonkers usually makes his appearance at the pier between 7 a.m. and 9 a.m.

The Marine Mammal Center, in nearby Sausalito, California, began tracking his movements from March 13, 2026. On the same day, the Pier 39 Instagram account posted a video of Chonkers lying on a dock, which soon went viral. Laura Gill, a public programs manager for the Marine Mammal Center, stated that while Steller Sea Lions are normally sighted around Washington or Alaska, Chonkers may have come down to the San Francisco Bay Area for food.

Shortly after, a Redditor based in San Francisco nicknamed him "Chonker," a play on the slang chonk, meaning a cutely chubby animal typically a dog or cat. More posts on the internet thereafter began referring to him as "Chonkers." He then became so popular that The Wall Street Journal reported a crowd of over a hundred tourists and locals watching him one day in April.

Steller sea lions have visited Pier 39 in the past for a few days at a time, but the extended stay by Chonkers is unusual. Due to his size, some harbormasters have reported concerns about potential harm to the docks as Chonkers' weight compresses the structure down to water level. Chonkers was last seen at the pier in the beginning of May, and has since left the area. It is possible that he left to pursue resources elsewhere or to find a mate.
