= Tubercle effect =

Aerodynamic phenomenon

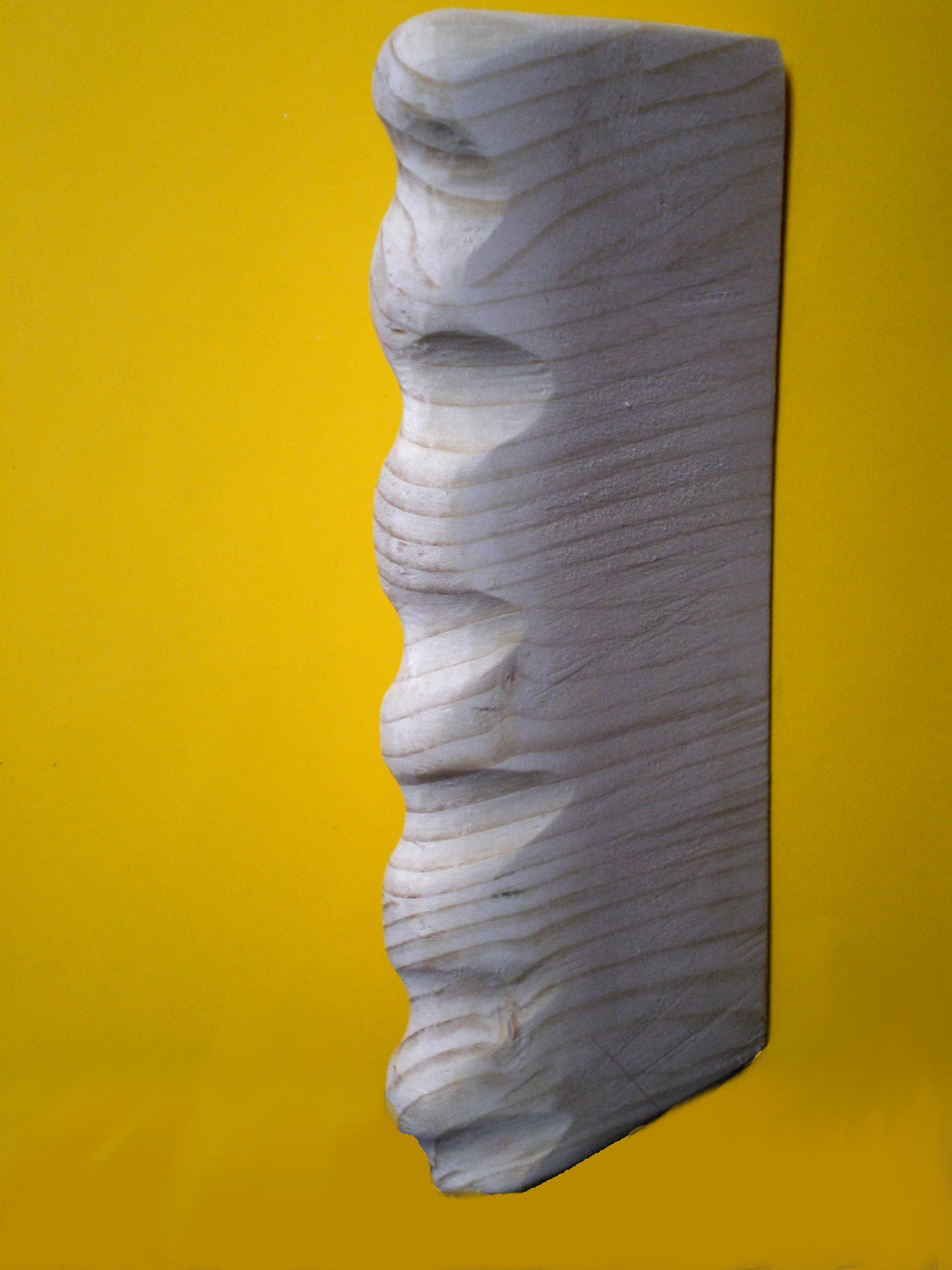
Tubercle model of a humpback whale flipper

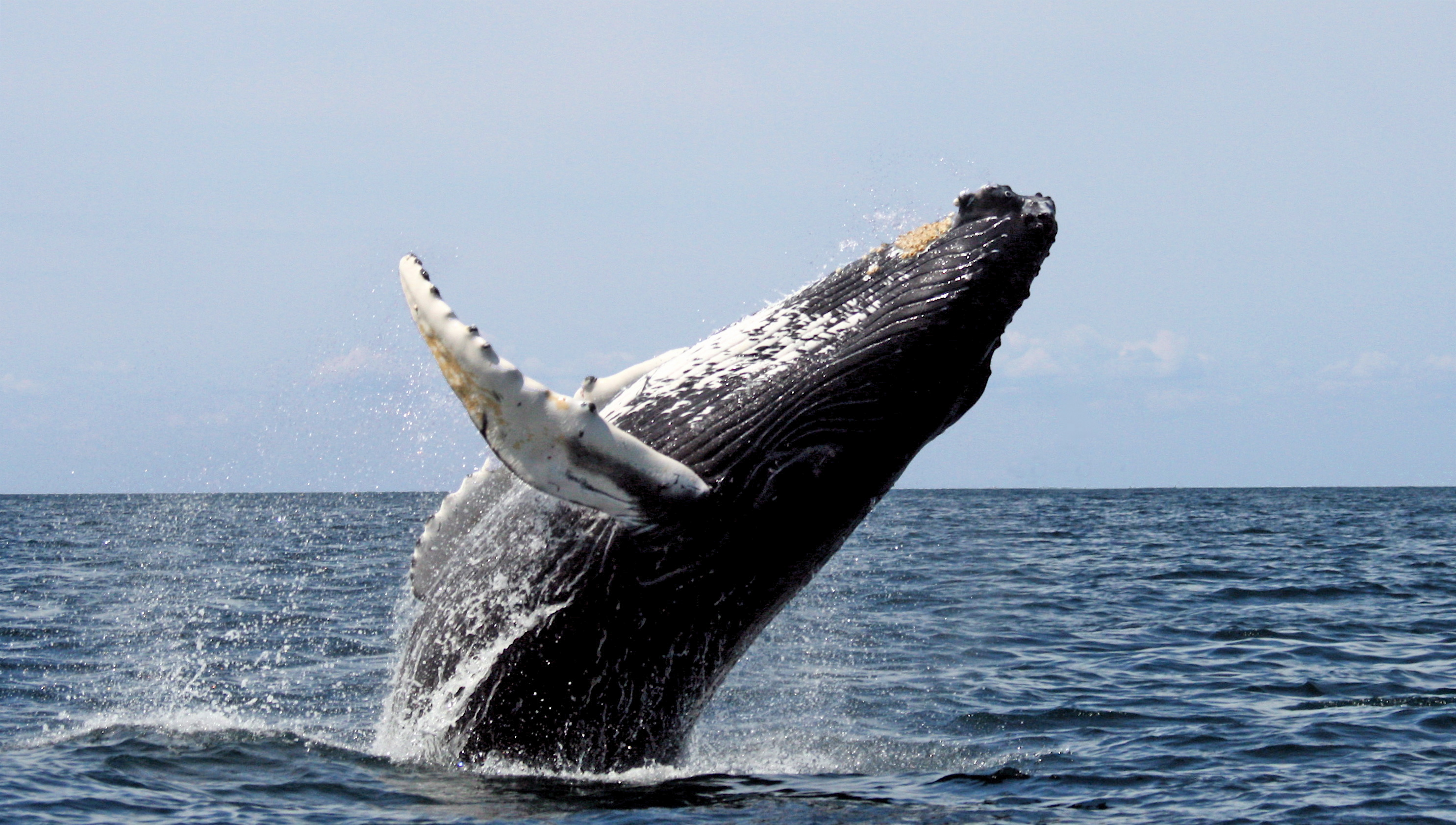
The tubercles on the humpback whale flipper.

The tubercle effect is a phenomenon where tubercles or large 'bumps' on the leading edge of an airfoil can improve its aerodynamics. The tubercle effect works by channeling flow over the airfoil into more narrow streams, creating higher velocities. Another side effect of these channels is the reduction of flow moving over the wingtip and resulting in less induced drag due to wingtip vortices. Using computational modeling, it was determined that the presence of tubercles produces a delay in the angle of attack until stall, thereby increasing maximum lift and decreasing drag. Humpback whales are the only known organisms to take advantage of the tubercle effect. It is believed that this effect allows them to be much more maneuverable in the water, allowing for easier capture of prey. The tubercles on their fins allow them to do aquatic maneuvers to catch their prey.

The tiny hooklets on the fore edge of an owl's wing have a similar effect that contributes to its aerodynamic manoeuvrability and stealth.

== Science behind the effect ==
The tubercle effect is a phenomenon in which tubercles, or large raised bumps on the leading edge of a wing, blade, or sail increase its aerodynamic or hydrodynamic performance. Research on this topic was inspired by the work of marine biologists on the behavior of humpback whales. Despite their large size, these whales are agile and are able to perform rolls and loops underwater. Research on humpback whales indicated that the presence of these tubercles on the leading edge of whale fins reduced stall and increased lift, while reducing noise in the post-stall regime. Researchers were motivated by these positive results to apply these concepts to aircraft wings as well as industrial and wind turbines.

Early research on this topic was performed by Watts & Fish followed by further experiments both in water and wind tunnels. Watts & Fish determined that the presence of tubercles on the leading edge of airfoil increased lift by 4.8%. Further numerical computations confirmed this result, and indicated that the presence of tubercles can decrease the effects of drag by 40%. Leading-edge tubercles have been found to reduce the point of maximum lift and increase the region of post-stall lift. In the post-stall regime, foils with tubercles experienced a gradual loss of lift as opposed to foils without tubercles, which experienced a sudden loss of lift.

The geometry of tubercles must also be considered, as the amplitude and wavelength of tubercles have an effect on flow control. Tubercles can be thought of as small delta wings with a curved apex, since they create a vortex on the upper edge of the tubercle. These vortical structures impose a downward deflection of the airflow (downwash) over the crests of tubercles. This downward deflection delays stall on the airfoil. On the contrary, in the troughs of these structures, there is a net upward deflection of airflow (upwash). Localized upwash is associated with higher angles of attack, which relates to increased lift, as the flow separation occurs in the troughs and stays there. The vortex created by the tubercle delays flow separation toward the trailing edge of the wing, thus reducing the effects of drag. However, in water, due to the crest/trough structure, cavitation is possible, and is undesirable. Cavitation occurs in areas of high flow velocity and low pressure, such as the trough of a tubercled structure. In water, air bubbles or pockets form on the upper side of the tubercle. These bubbles reduce lift and increase drag, while increasing noise in the flow when the bubbles collapse. However, tubercles can be modified to manipulate the location of cavitation.

The effect of amplitude of tubercles has a more significant impact on post-stall performance than wavelength. Higher amplitude of tubercles has been linked to more gradual stall and higher post-stall lift, as well as lower pre-stall lift slope. The wavelength and amplitude can both be optimized to increase the post-stall performance.

Experiments on the effects of leading-edge tubercles have primarily focused on rigid bodies, and more research is needed in order to apply the knowledge of the tubercle effect to industrial, aircraft, or energy applications.

== Biological occurrences of tubercles ==
Tubercles are a material phenomenon that occurs in multiple organisms. These organisms include the humpback whale, hammerhead sharks, scallops, and chondrichthyans, an extinct aquatic organism.

One organism that tubercles are notable in is the humpback whale. The tubercles on humpback whales are located on the leading edge of the flippers. The tubercles allow the very large whales to execute tight turns underwater and swim efficiently; a task imperative for the humpback whales feeding. The tubercles on the flippers help to maintain lift, preventing stall, and decreasing the drag coefficient during turning maneuvers. Tubercles on the humpback whale are considered passive flow control because they are structural.

Tubercles develop in the fetus of the humpback whale. Typically 9-11 tubercles are present on each flipper and decrease in size as they near the tip of the flipper. The largest tubercles are the first and fourth tubercles from the shoulder of the whale. This anatomical structure is common among large fish species, primarily predatory species on their pectoral fins.

== Modern applications in industry ==
Leading edge tubercles are up and coming in the manufacturing area. Wind turbine performances rely on blade aerodynamics where similar flow characteristics are observed (source # 9) modern turbines have twisted blades to account for the angle of attack at specific design conditions. However, in practical application, turbines often operate at off-design conditions where stall occurs, causing a decrease in performance and efficiency. In order to look for possible improvement of the energy efficiency of turbine, the influence of leading edge tubercles must be investigated in more depth.

Tubercles provide a bio-inspired design that offers commercial viability in design of watercraft, aircraft, ventilation fans, and windmills. Control of passive flow through tubercle designs has the advantage of eliminating complex, costly, high-maintenance heavy control mechanisms while improving properties of performance for lifting bodies in air and water. One issue that remains today is the difference in the scale of structure and operation that each of these bio-inspired technologies use. New techniques are being implemented in order to develop methods of delaying stall in flow applications. For example, jet aircraft with leading edge defects can carry greater payloads at faster speeds and higher altitudes, allowing for greater economic efficiency in the aeronautical field. While these effects are found in many aquatic animals and birds, scaling these designs up to industrial application brings forward another set of issues regarding the high stresses associated by machinery. In airplanes for example, designs are much more limited than the complex kinematics and structures of the joints in the wings of birds which produces agile turning maneuvers. This problem can be rectified by further researching into the overlap between size and performance between biological structure and engineering application. It was also observed in turbine design that leading-edge effects have the ability to improve power generation by a factor of up to 20%.

In the aeronautical engineering field, leading-edge tubercles placed on turbine blades can increase generation of energy. Blades with tubercles were also found to be effective at generation of power at both high and low wind speeds, meaning that comparing blades with smooth leading edges to those with leading-edge tubercles, the blades with leading-edge tubercles demonstrated enhanced performance. The utility of tubercle in performance improvement of engineering systems comes directly from examination of biological structures. It is important to realize the versatility that creating designs with bio-enhanced properties offers promise into many flow design applications. As these designs become more and more advanced, the application of biomimetric technologies become crucial to the next development of high-performance machinery and equipment as different methods of efficiency are developed through these methods.

== See also ==
- Biomimicry
