= Rowing stroke =

Man rowing in slow pace typical for long distances

In rowing (sport), the stroke is the action of moving the oar through the water in order to propel the boat forward. The two fundamental reference points in the stroke are the catch where the oar blade is placed in the water, and the extraction (also known as the 'finish', 'release' or 'tapping down') where the oar blade is removed from the water. After the blade is placed in the water at the catch, the rower applies pressure to the oar levering the boat forward which is called the drive phase of the stroke. Once the rower extracts the oar from the water, the recovery phase begins, setting up the rower's body for the next stroke.

== Stages of a stroke ==
=== Drive ===
The drive is the phase from the catch to the extraction.

- As soon as the oar blade is placed in the water at the catch, the rower begins to lever the boat past the blade by straightening the legs while the body remains leaned forward and the arms straight. This is called the leg drive.
- The rower continues pushing with the legs while beginning to apply additional power by opening up their back towards the bow of the boat.
- After the rower completes the leg drive, the rower finishes opening up their back towards the bow while at the same time using their arms to pull the oar(s) to his chest. This is called the draw. First, the shoulders heave, then the elbows bend. Often the shoulder heave is omitted, and power is wasted or lost
- The rower pushes the oar handle down so the oar blade comes out of the water.
- Just as the oar blade is being removed from the water, the rower rotates the oar handle 90 degrees so that the blade is again parallel to the water. This action is referred to as feathering.
- At this point the rower is in the same position as the beginning, torso leaning back, hands drawn in to the body, and legs extended.

Leg muscles are the main source of power in a stroke providing 60%

=== Recovery ===
The recovery follows the drive and returns the oar and the rower from the point of extraction to the catch.

- Just after the extraction (or finish) with the oar out of the water and the face of the blade parallel to the water (the blades are "feathered"). The rower has legs straight, body leaning back, and arms pulled in so that the oar handle is a few inches from the solar plexus. This is the beginning of what is called the recovery or the slide.
- The rower extends the arms fully forward (toward the stern) pushing the oar away from their body while, at the same time, keeping the oar at a constant height with their legs straight, and torso leaning back.
- The rower leans the body forward to around 30 degrees past vertical, continuing to keep the oar level, not bending the knees and keeping the back straight. This stage of the recovery is sometimes referred to as "body prep".
- The rower bends the legs, bringing the sliding seat forward (i.e. toward the stern) on its rollers, while the oar remains level.
- While continuing to slide the seat forward, the rower rotates the oar handle(s), causing the face of the blade to be perpendicular to the water. This is called squaring or rolling up the blade. This, depending on the rower's technique, begins approximately when the oar handle(s) pass over the ankles.
- When the rower reaches the sternmost point of the slide, the end of the recovery, and the shins are vertical, the blade is quickly and smoothly dropped into the water by a slight lifting of the hands. This is called the catch.

== Sweep vs sculling ==
Sweep rowers (one oar per person) and scullers (two oars, one in each hand) have similar stroke styles, with some differences to accommodate the number of oars held by the rower. The most notable difference is that the oar handles overlap in sculling at the midpoint of the drive, and again during the recovery. This requires the sculler to cross one hand over (left over right) and/or in front of the other hand to avoid the oar handles colliding. While sculling is otherwise a fully symmetrical movement, sweep oar rowing is slightly asymmetrical and many rowers strongly prefer one side to the other.

Sweep oar rowers feather and square the oar with the inside hand (the one closer to the rowlock), allowing the handle to turn within the outside hand, whose wrist remains flat throughout. This is not possible in sculling, where feathering and squaring is achieved by holding the oar handle in the extended fingers when feathered, and rolling it into the palm of the hand to square it, the wrist remaining flat throughout.

The average speed of a boat increases with the crew size, and sculling boats are slightly faster than the equivalent sweep boats.

== Local differences ==
The rowing stroke differs slightly depending on location and coaching technique and especially the coach. Differences (especially between experienced rowers) are only marginal and can often only be seen by detailed video-analysis. For example, sometimes the Canadian eight team used a style where the body was swung more during the drive.

== See also ==
- Rowing (sport)
- Rate of striking
