= Sculling =

Type of rowing when a rower has two oars

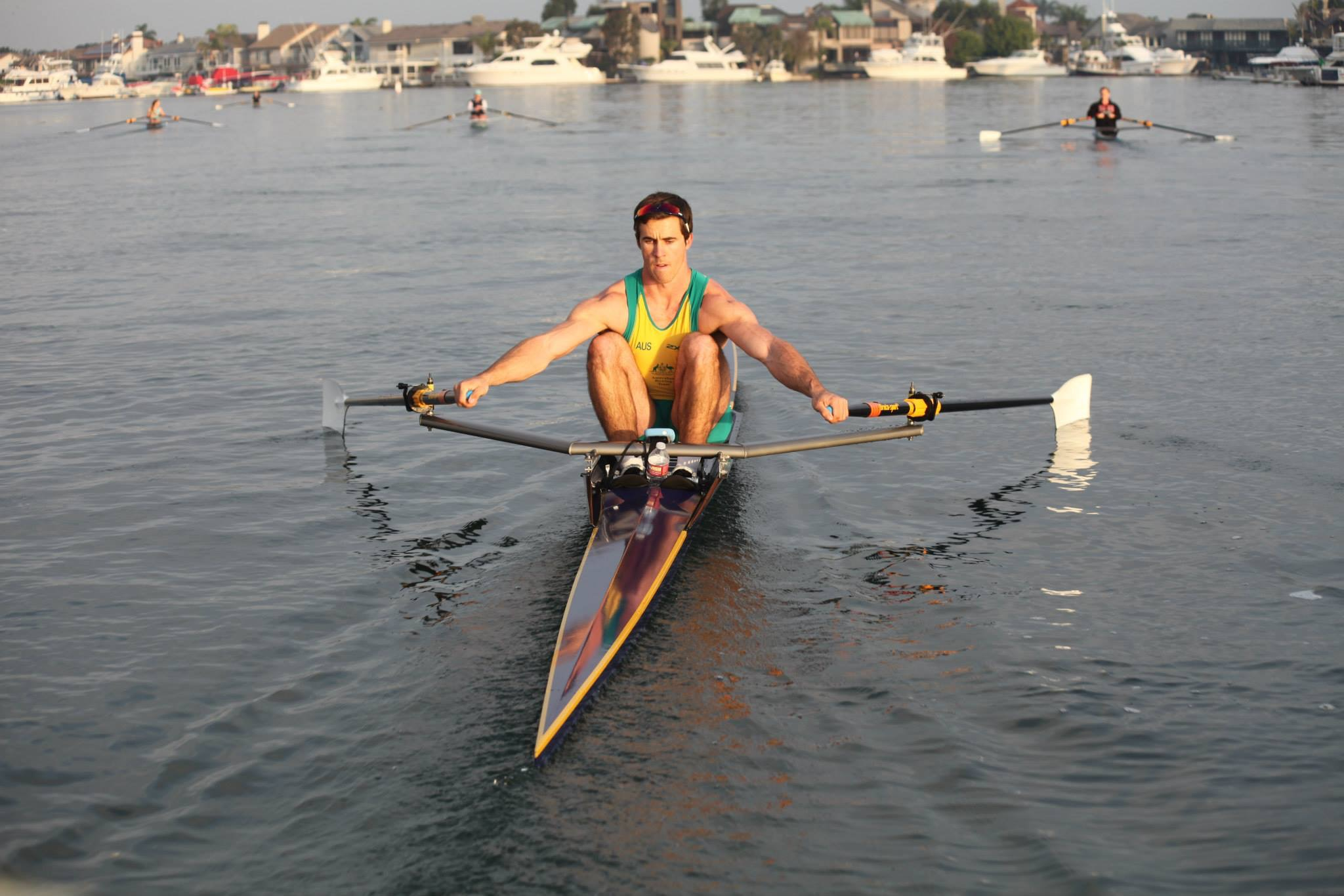
Sculler ready to catch with blades squared

Sculling is the use of oars to propel a boat by moving them through the water on both sides of the craft, or moving one oar over the stern. A long, narrow boat with sliding seats, rigged with two oars per rower may be referred to as a scull, its oars may be referred to as sculls and a person rowing it referred to as a sculler.

Sculling is distinguished from sweep rowing, whereby each boat crew member employs an oar, complemented by another crew member on the opposite side with an oar, usually with each pulling it with two hands and from stern sculling, which uses an oar to propel a vessel with side-to-side movements from the stern.

== Overview ==
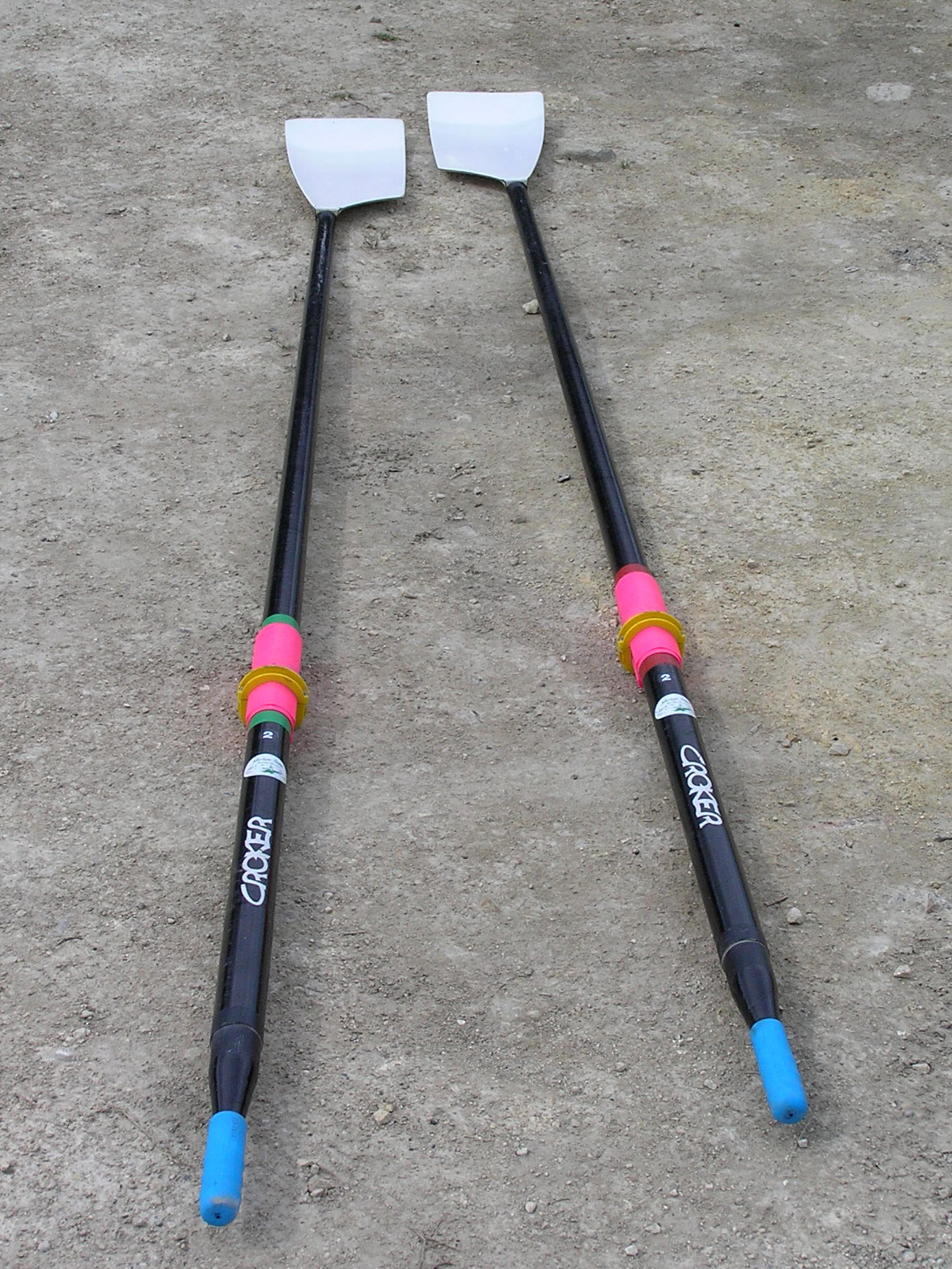
Sculling oars for competitive rowing

Sculling is a form of rowing in which a boat is propelled by one or more rowers, each of whom operates two oars, one held in the fingers and upper palm of each hand. This contrasts with the other common method of rowing, sweep rowing, in which each rower may use both hands to operate a single oar on either the port or starboard side of the boat. Sculling is generally considered the more technically complex of the two disciplines. Sculling can either be competitive or recreational, but the watercraft used will vary between the two as the racing shells of competitive rowing are built for speed rather than stability. Racing shells are also far more expensive and fragile than what is suitable for the recreational rower; a typical racing shell sells for thousands of dollars while recreational sculling boats may cost significantly less.

=== In crew ===
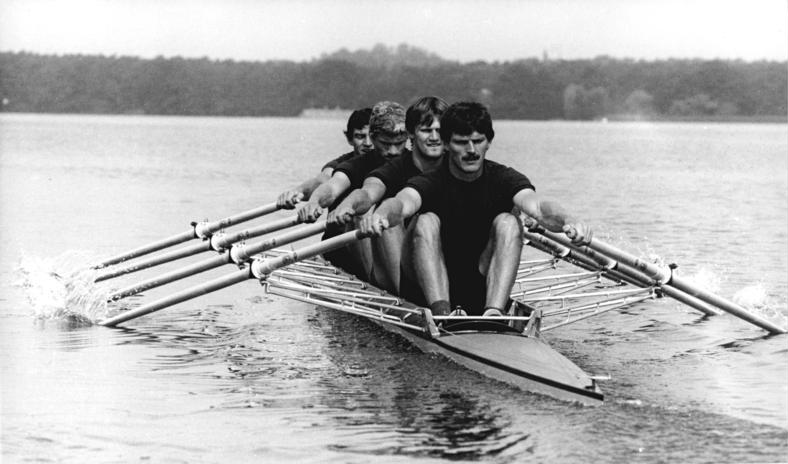
Quad, Germany, 1982. Stroke Seat: Martin Winter. 3 Seat: Uwe Heppner. 2 Seat: Uwe Mund. Bow Seat: Karl-Heinz Bußert.

Sculling, one of the two major divisions of crew (or competitive rowing), is composed of races between small, sculled boats crewed by various numbers of rowers. Generally, one, two, or four athletes row these shells. These shells are classified according to the number of rowers that they can hold: singles have one seat, doubles have two, and quads have four. In keeping with this pattern, quads rowed by three people (due, for instance, to a temporary shortage of rowers) are often colloquially referred to as "triples". The boat manufacturer 'Stampflï' has created a triple with only three seats (rather than using a quad occupied by three people). A rare sculling shell is the octuple, rowed by an eight-man crew, which is sometimes used by large rowing programs to teach novice rowers how to scull in a balanced, coxed boat.

The physical movement of sculling is split into two main parts: the drive and the recovery. These two parts are separated by what is called the "catch" and the "finish". The drive is the section of the rowing stroke where the face of the oars, also known as blades, are firmly placed in the water and the rower is propelling the boat forwards by pulling against the anchor the oars provide. The recovery is the section where the rower's blades are not in the water, but instead gliding above it as the rower prepares for the next stroke. The catch is the moment the blades are dropped into the water at the end of the recovery and the start of the drive, while the finish is when the blades are slipping out after the drive is done and the recovery is beginning. In order to improve balance on the recovery, the blades are feathered, or held parallel to the surface of the water, at the finish, and squared (perpendicular to the water surface) at the catch.

Competitive crew requires an efficient stroke with all rowers matching the cadence and movements of the stroke seat, the rower closest to the shell's stern. The shell may have a coxswain, or "cox", to steer the boat, encourage the crew, and monitor the rate, though coxswains are highly uncommon in competitive sculling shells and the rower in bow seat usually takes on these responsibilities instead. The bow-most rower may have equipment that attaches the skeg of the shell to one of the bow's shoes to aid with the steering; without such equipment, a sculling boat is directed by uneven pressure applied to the opposing blades.

A key technical difference between sculling and sweeping in crew is that the sculling oar handles overlap twice during the stroke cycle (sweep oar handles never overlap during normal rowing because each sweeper usually holds only one oar). The overlap occurs at the midpoint of the drive and again during the recovery; because of this, scullers must hold one hand (conventionally the left hand) higher than the other at the point of overlap. To prevent this from impacting the balance of the boat, one oarlock (conventionally the starboard one, to the rower's lefthand side) is rigged higher than the other prior to rowing. This prevents the oar handles and the sculler's thumbs from colliding with one another and causing a crab or other problems.

== See also ==
- Single scull
- Double scull
- Quad scull
- Octuple scull
- Stern sculling
- Oars
- Rowing (sport)
- Watercraft rowing
