= Sweep rowing =

Type of rowing when a rower has one oar

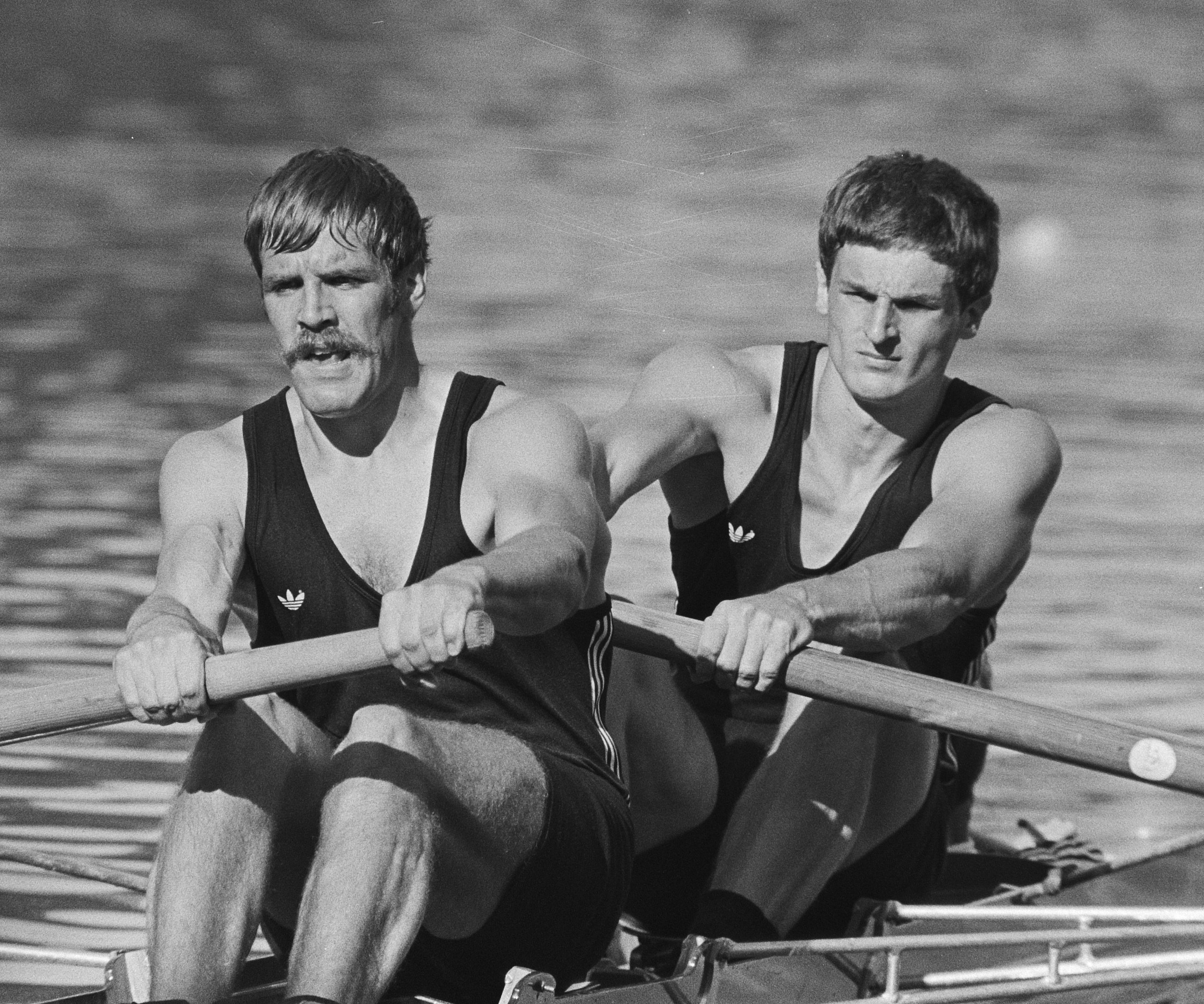
An example of sweep rowing, with Peter van de Pas (left), Evert Kroes (right), 1977

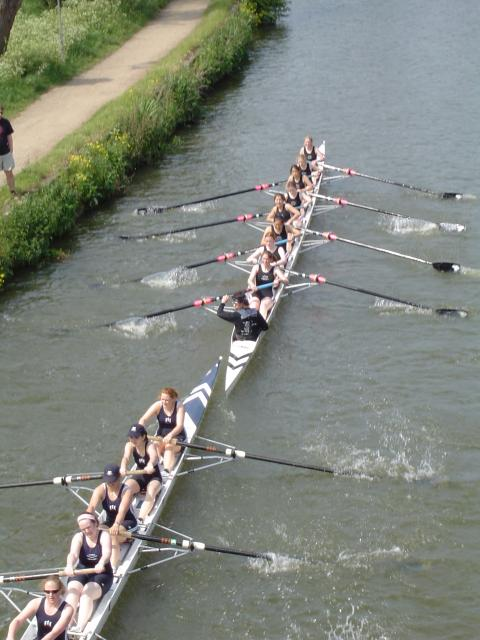
College women's eights during Oxford University Eights Week

Sweep rowing is one of two disciplines of the sport of rowing. In sweep rowing each rower has one oar, usually held with both hands. As each rower has only one oar, the rowers have to be paired so that there are equal numbers of oars on each side of the boat. In the United Kingdom, rowing generally refers to sweep rowing only. The term pulling was also used historically. In the other rowing discipline, sculling, each rower holds two oars, one in each hand.

Sweep or single oar rowing has a long history and was the means of propulsion for Greek triremes and Viking longboats. These boats were wide enough for the pairs of rowers to sit alongside each other. Boats can go faster the narrower they are, because a smaller cross-sectional area reduces drag and wave drag and gives a sharper angle to the bow. The hulls can be kept narrower by attaching riggers to the gunwales, so that the oarlocks can be placed farther out to carry longer oars. A narrower hull means the rowers cannot sit side by side and so they sit one behind another. The riggers are placed alternately along the boat so that the forces are approximately equal to each side of the boat, but they are nevertheless asymmetrical. This means a sweep oared racing shell has to be stiffer in order to handle the unmatched forces, and so requires more bracing, which means it has to be heavier and slower than an equivalent sculling boat.

Sweep rowing has to be done with crews in multiples of two: pairs, fours and eights (sixes and boats longer than eight are not used in competitive racing today). Each rower in a sweep boat is on either stroke side (port) or bow side (starboard), according to which side of the boat the rower's oar extends from. In a sculling boat the oars and riggers apply forces symmetrically to the shell. While sculling boats are also in multiples of two, it is possible to have a single scull or triple scull.

The primary sweep oar racing boats are as follows.

Eight (8+)
A shell with 8 rowers. Always with coxswain because of the size, weight and speed of the boat; bowloader eights exist but are banned from most competitions for safety reasons.
Four (4-) or (4+)
A shell with 4 rowers. Coxless fours (4-) are often referred to as straight fours, and are commonly used by lightweight and elite crews and are raced at the Olympics. In club and school rowing, one more frequently sees a coxed four (4+) which is easier to row, and has a coxswain to steer.
Pair (2-) or (2+)
A shell with 2 rowers. The coxless pair (2-), often called a straight pair, is a demanding but satisfying boat to master. Coxed pairs (2+) are rarely rowed by most club and school programs. It is no longer an Olympic event and was dropped from the World Rowing Championships in 2017.
