= Rowing at the 1984 Summer Olympics – Men's quadruple sculls =

Men's quadruple sculls at the Games of the XXIII Olympiad
- Date: 31 July – 5 August 1984
- Competitors: 40 from 10 nations

Medalists
1st place, gold medalist(s)		Albert Hedderich; Raimund Hörmann; Dieter Wiedenmann; Michael Dürsch	West Germany
2nd place, silver medalist(s)		Paul Reedy; Gary Gullock; Timothy McLaren; Anthony Lovrich	Australia
3rd place, bronze medalist(s)		Doug Hamilton; Mike Hughes; Phil Monckton; Bruce Ford	Canada

The men's quadruple sculls competition at the 1984 Summer Olympics took place at took place at Lake Casitas, California, United States of America.

== Competition format ==
The competition consisted of two main rounds (heats and finals) as well as a repechage. The 10 boats were divided into two heats for the first round, with 5 boats in each heat. The winner of each heat advanced directly to the "A" final (1st through 6th place). The remaining 8 boats were placed in the repechage. The repechage featured two heats, with 4 boats in each heat. The top two boats in each repechage heat went to the "A" final. The remaining 4 boats (3rd and 4th placers in the repechage heats) competed in the "B" final for 7th through 10th place.

All races were over a 2000-metre course.

== Results ==
=== Heats ===
The heats were held on July 31. It was a warm day (23 °C); the wind was calm for the first heat but picked up to a 1.1 m/s southwest wind for the second. The winner of each heat advanced to the A final, with all others going to the repechage. No boats were eliminated in this round.

==== Heat 1 ====
The first heat was a close competition between Australia and Spain for the single direct-advancement spot. Spain led early, by 0.22 seconds at 500 metres and by 0.32 seconds at 1000 metres. But Australia took control in the second half of the race, leading by 0.84 seconds at 1500 metres and finishing with a comfortable 2.42 second margin. The other three boats were static in their positioning, with the Netherlands third, the United States fourth, and Argentina fifth at each of the quarter marks and at the finish.

Rank	Rower	Nation	Time	Notes
1	Gary Gullock; Anthony Lovrich; Timothy McLaren; Paul Reedy	Australia	5:59.38	QA
2	Jesús González; Julio Oliver; Luis Miguel Oliver; Manuel Vera	Spain	6:01.80	R
3	Mark Emke; Frans Göbel; Steven van Groningen; Nico Rienks	Netherlands	6:08.50	R
4	Bruce Beall; Curtis Fleming; Ridgely Johnson; Greg Montesi	United States	6:13.51	R
5	Oscar Bonini; Gustavo Calderón; Omar Ferrari; Federico Lungwitz	Argentina	6:28.80	R

==== Heat 2 ====
The second heat saw another close contest for first place. West Germany led France by a quarter-second at the 500 metre mark. By the halfway point, Italy had jumped from third to first, with France dropping from first to third. That order held through the 1500 metre mark, but the Germans passed Italy (and Canada passed France) over the final stretch. Norway trailed from start to finish.

Rank	Rower	Nation	Time	Notes
1	Michael Dürsch; Albert Hedderich; Raimund Hörmann; Dieter Wiedenmann	West Germany	5:58.73	QA
2	Antonio Dell'Aquila; Renato Gaeta; Stefano Lari; Piero Poli	Italy	6:00.39	R
3	Bruce Ford; Doug Hamilton; Mike Hughes; Phil Monckton	Canada	6:02.08	R
4	Pascal Body; Marc Boudoux; Pascal Dubosquelle; Serge Fornara	France	6:05.18	R
5	Ivan Enstad; Pål Sandli; Espen Thorsen; Vetle Vinje	Norway	6:09.72	R

=== Repechage ===
The repechage was held on August 2. It was another warm day (24 °C); the wind was a .5 m/s southwest wind. The top two boats in each repechage heat advanced to the "A" final, with all others going to the "B" final (out of medal contention).

==== Repechage heat 1 ====
In the first repechage heat, the two European boats started strong while the two boats from North America lagged behind initially. After the halfway mark (at which Spain led Norway by slightly over a second, Canada by two and a quarter seconds, and the United States by two and a half seconds), the Canadian team made their break. The Canadians narrowed the distance by 1500 metres and overtook both Norway and Spain in the final 500 metres. The contest then became between the two European squads for the second advancement place; Norway, however, was never able to close that one-second gap and finished out of the "A" final. The United States, close behind Canada at halfway, was unable to make the same break and fell behind the rest of the field.

Rank	Rower	Nation	Time	Notes
1	Bruce Ford; Doug Hamilton; Mike Hughes; Phil Monckton	Canada	6:07.93	QA
2	Jesús González; Julio Oliver; Luis Miguel Oliver; Manuel Vera	Spain	6:08.65	QA
3	Ivan Enstad; Pål Sandli; Espen Thorsen; Vetle Vinje	Norway	6:09.11	QB
4	Bruce Beall; Curtis Fleming; Ridgely Johnson; Greg Montesi	United States	6:14.32	QB

==== Repechage heat 2 ====
The second repechage heat was another three-way race for the two "A" final spots, with Argentina well out of the running by halfway. The Netherlands took the early lead, maintaining it through the 1000 metre mark. Italy had caught and passed the Dutch team by 1500 metres, with France still running third. Over the last 500 metres, France passed the Netherlands as well to force the latter out of the top two. France also passed Italy during that last quarter of the race, winning the heat.

Rank	Rower	Nation	Time	Notes
1	Pascal Body; Marc Boudoux; Pascal Dubosquelle; Serge Fornara	France	6:08.44	QA
2	Antonio Dell'Aquila; Renato Gaeta; Stefano Lari; Piero Poli	Italy	6:09.28	QA
3	Mark Emke; Frans Göbel; Steven van Groningen; Nico Rienks	Netherlands	6:09.53	QB
4	Oscar Bonini; Gustavo Calderón; Omar Ferrari; Federico Lungwitz	Argentina	6:29.36	QB

=== Finals ===
==== Final B ====
The "B" final, for 7th through 10th place, was held on August 3. It was another warm day (23 °C) with 0.5 m/s east winds. The top three finishers were separated by less than a second, while Argentina was well back (over 20 seconds behind the third-place team) for a final placement of 10th and last. The Dutch boat was the early leader, followed closely by the Americans. By halfway, the United States had taken the lead and Norway was pressing the Netherlands for second. The Americans would not relinquish the lead, taking 7th overall. Norway passed the Netherlands between 1000 and 1500 metres, taking 8th by fighting off a last-quarter push back from the Dutch, who finished 9th overall. Argentina competed well over the first quarter of the course (and was ahead of Norway at the 500 metre mark), but fell 6 seconds behind by halfway and continued to lag.

Rank	Rower	Nation	Time
7	Bruce Beall; Curtis Fleming; Ridgely Johnson; Greg Montesi	United States	6:11.50
8	Ivan Enstad; Pål Sandli; Espen Thorsen; Vetle Vinje	Norway	6:12.18
9	Mark Emke; Frans Göbel; Steven van Groningen; Nico Rienks	Netherlands	6:12.41
10	Oscar Bonini; Gustavo Calderón; Omar Ferrari; Federico Lungwitz	Argentina	6:32.52

==== Final A ====
The "A" final was held on August 5. The temperature was cooler, at 18 °C, and the wind was now 0.5 m/s east-northeast. Australia led from the start, with West Germany consistently second and Canada pushing from a slower beginning (5th at 500 metres and at 1000 metres, 3rd at 1500 metres) to make it a three-way race over the last quarter of the course. Both West Germany and Canada gained on Australia in the final 500 metres, but only the Germans were able to catch the Australians to take the gold medal. Canada settled for bronze. Italy, which had been in third until passed by Canada, fought off a late push from France for fourth place. By contrast, Spain, which had been fourth until Canada's surge, fell behind the French and finished sixth.

Rank	Rower	Nation	Time
1st place, gold medalist(s)	Michael Dürsch; Albert Hedderich; Raimund Hörmann; Dieter Wiedenmann	West Germany	5:57.55
2nd place, silver medalist(s)	Gary Gullock; Anthony Lovrich; Timothy McLaren; Paul Reedy	Australia	5:57.98
3rd place, bronze medalist(s)	Bruce Ford; Doug Hamilton; Mike Hughes; Phil Monckton	Canada	5:59.07
4	Antonio Dell'Aquila; Renato Gaeta; Stefano Lari; Piero Poli	Italy	6:00.94
5	Pascal Body; Marc Boudoux; Pascal Dubosquelle; Serge Fornara	France	6:01.35
6	Jesús González; Julio Oliver; Luis Miguel Oliver; Manuel Vera	Spain	6:04.99

== Final classification ==
Rank	Rowers	Country
1st place, gold medalist(s)	Albert Hedderich; Raimund Hörmann; Dieter Wiedenmann; Michael Dürsch	West Germany
2nd place, silver medalist(s)	Paul Reedy; Gary Gullock; Timothy McLaren; Anthony Lovrich	Australia
3rd place, bronze medalist(s)	Doug Hamilton; Mike Hughes; Phil Monckton; Bruce Ford	Canada
4	Piero Poli; Renato Gaeta; Antonio Dell'Aquila; Stefano Lari	Italy
5	Marc Boudoux; Serge Fornara; Pascal Body; Pascal Dubosquelle	France
6	Luis Miguel Oliver; Jesús González; Manuel Vera; Julio Oliver	Spain
7	Curtis Fleming; Greg Montesi; Ridgely Johnson; Bruce Beall	United States
8	Pål Sandli; Espen Thorsen; Vetle Vinje; Ivan Enstad	Norway
9	Steven van Groningen; Nico Rienks; Frans Göbel; Mark Emke	Netherlands
10	Federico Lungwitz; Oscar Bonini; Omar Ferrari; Gustavo Calderón	Argentina
