= Timothy McLaren =

Australian rower (born 1956)

Medal record

Men's rowing

Representing Australia

Olympic Games
Silver medal – second place	1984 Los Angeles	Quadruple sculls

Timothy George McLaren OAM (born 24 September 1956 in Cootamundra, New South Wales) is an Australian former Olympian rower and high-performance international rowing coach. He was a four-time Australian national champion, a national representative and won a silver medal in the men's quad scull at the 1984 Los Angeles Olympics.

== Club and national rowing career ==
McLaren only took up still water rowing at age 25 in 1981 and joined the St George Rowing Club in Sydney. The following year he competed for the national single, double and quad sculls titles at the Australian Rowing Championships, winning the double scull championship in St George colours with Allan Pollack. At the 1983 Australian Championships he won the double scull and quad sculls national titles. He also contested the single scull that year but capsized in the final when holding a one-length lead at the half mark. In 1984 he again raced for Australian national titles in all three men's sculling boats and again won the double with Pollack.

== International rowing career ==
McLaren was first selected for Australia to row the single scull at the 1983 World Rowing Championships in Duisburg. He won the B final for an overall seventh placing. In 1984 McLaren was the sole New South Welshmen selected in the quad scull to represent at the 1984 Los Angeles Olympics. Coached by Rusty Robertson and building on the experienced bow pairing of Paul Reedy and Gary Gullock, the quad won their heat and took the silver medal in the final being pipped by West Germany in the final sprint.

== Coaching career ==
McLaren joined the UTS Haberfield Rowing Club in Sydney as head coach in 1992 coinciding with the University of Technology's purchase of the old Haberfield Rowing Club, their injection of financial support and development of focused high-performance program. During McLaren's first 15 year stint with UTSHRC from 1992 to 2007, thirteen UTS Haberfield rowers made Australian Olympic rowing selection at three Olympic Games winning eleven medals (ten bronze and one silver)

In 2007 McLaren was head coach and director of the California Rowing Club and took a CRC men's double scull to the Beijing Olympics. From there took his first position as head coach USA Rowing. He headed the US men's team for the Olympiad 2009 through to London 2012. He oversaw the centralisation of the till-then disparate US men's team into facilities for year round training in Chula Vista, California. However at London 2012 despite having men's crews in six events, the US men's team won only a bronze in the men's four with the men's eight struggling to grab a last minute qualifying spot for the regatta and finishing fourth in the final.

Since 2012 he has continued his involvement with the UTS Haberfield Rowing Club in Sydney and in coaching New South Wales selection crews to the Interstate Regatta within the Australian Rowing Championships. He coached a 2018 New South Wales lightweight four and the 2022 New South Wales men's youth eight to national victory at the Interstate Regatta. He took UTS Haberfield crews to national titles including a LWM2X in 2017.

He has had advisory coaching roles in China and at Cambridge University for their Boat Race Program and in 2020 McLaren rekindled his involvement with US men's head coach Mike Teti in preparations of the US men's team for Tokyo 2020.

== Accolades ==
McLaren was awarded the Medal of the Order of Australia in the 1998 Australia Day Honours for "service to rowing, particularly as a coach of Australian crews participating at the 1992 and 1996 Olympic Games and in world rowing championships since 1990, and in on-water coach education".
