= Rondina =

Rondina is a surname. Notable people with the surname include:

- Sisi Rondina (born 1996), Filipina volleyball player
- Sergio Rondina (born 1971), Argentine football manager
- William Rondina, American fashion designer and philanthropist

== See also ==
- Jevgenia Rõndina (born 1989), Estonian rower
