= Scott Timmins =

Canadian ice hockey player (born 1989)

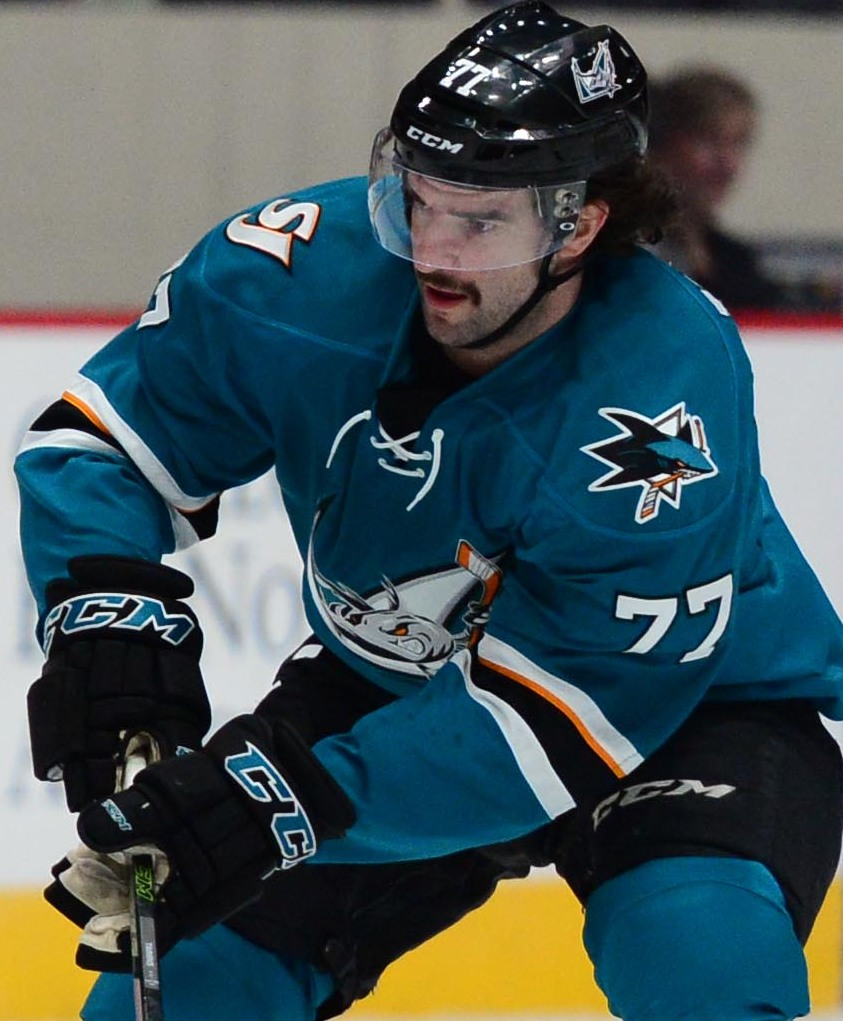
- Timmins with the San Jose Barracuda in 2015
- Born: September 11, 1989 (age 37) Hamilton, Ontario, Canada
- Height: 5 ft 11 in (180 cm)
- Weight: 192 lb (87 kg; 13 st 10 lb)
- Position: Centre
- Shoots: Left
- AIHL team Former teams: Melbourne Mustangs; Florida Panthers; Rochester Americans; San Antonio Rampage; Albany Devils; San Jose Barracuda; Straubing Tigers; Dornbirn Bulldogs; Fehérvár AV19; Eispiraten Crimmitschau
- NHL draft: 165th overall, 2009; Florida Panthers
- Playing career: 2010–present

Scott Timmins (born September 11, 1989) is a Canadian professional ice hockey player who is a centre for the Melbourne Mustangs of the Australian Ice Hockey League (AIHL). He was selected by the Florida Panthers in the sixth round (165th overall) of the 2009 NHL entry draft.

== Playing career ==
Scott grew up in Hamilton, Ontario where he spent most of his minor hockey career playing for the Hamilton Reps of the Alliance Pavilion League. He led his Reps team to an Alliance Championship in Minor Midget in 2004–05 before being a 5th round choice (98th overall) of the Kitchener Rangers in the 2005 OHL Priority Selection.

Timmins was reassigned the following season to the Burlington Cougars Jr.A. club of the Ontario Junior Hockey League (OHA) for the 2005–06 season. The following year, he signed with the Rangers for the 2006–07 season.

On April 24, 2010, Timmins, with the Ontario Hockey League's Windsor Spitfires, scored a natural hat trick against the Kitchener Rangers during game 6 of the OHL Western Conference final. The final score was 6–4, in favour of Windsor.

Timmins made his NHL debut with the Florida Panthers during the 2010–11 season on February 1, 2011, and scored his first NHL goal a day later against Alex Auld of the Montreal Canadiens.

On September 28, 2013, Timmins was traded by the Panthers to the New Jersey Devils in exchange for Krystofer Barch. During his tenure with the Devils, he was primarily assigned to AHL affiliate, the Albany Devils.

Unsigned over the summer leading into the 2015–16 season, Timmins accepted a try-out offer to attend the San Jose Barracuda AHL training camp on September 28, 2015. He made the inaugural opening night roster with the Barracuda.

As a free agent the following off-season, Timmins left North America to sign a one-year contract abroad, agreeing with German club, Straubing Tigers of the Deutsche Eishockey Liga on July 27, 2016. In the 2016–17 season, Timmins contributed offensively with the Tigers, producing 12 goals and 27 points in 46 games.

On August 14, 2017, Timmins left Germany as a free agent, signing to an initial one-year contract in the neighbouring EBEL, with Austrian club, Dornbirn Bulldogs.

After two seasons with Dornbirn, Timmins left the Bulldogs as a free agent and continued in the EBEL, signing with Hungarian competitors, Fehérvár AV19, on April 10, 2019.

Timmins joined the Melbourne Mustangs of the AIHL in 2022, finishing fifth overall in the league for scoring in the 2022 season before re-signing for 2023. Timmins was awarded the AIHL Regular Season Most Valuable Player for 2023, leading the league with 82 points in 26 games during the regular season, before going on to score a further four points in three games during the playoffs, in which the Mustangs won the Goodall Cup as AIHL champions.

== Career statistics ==
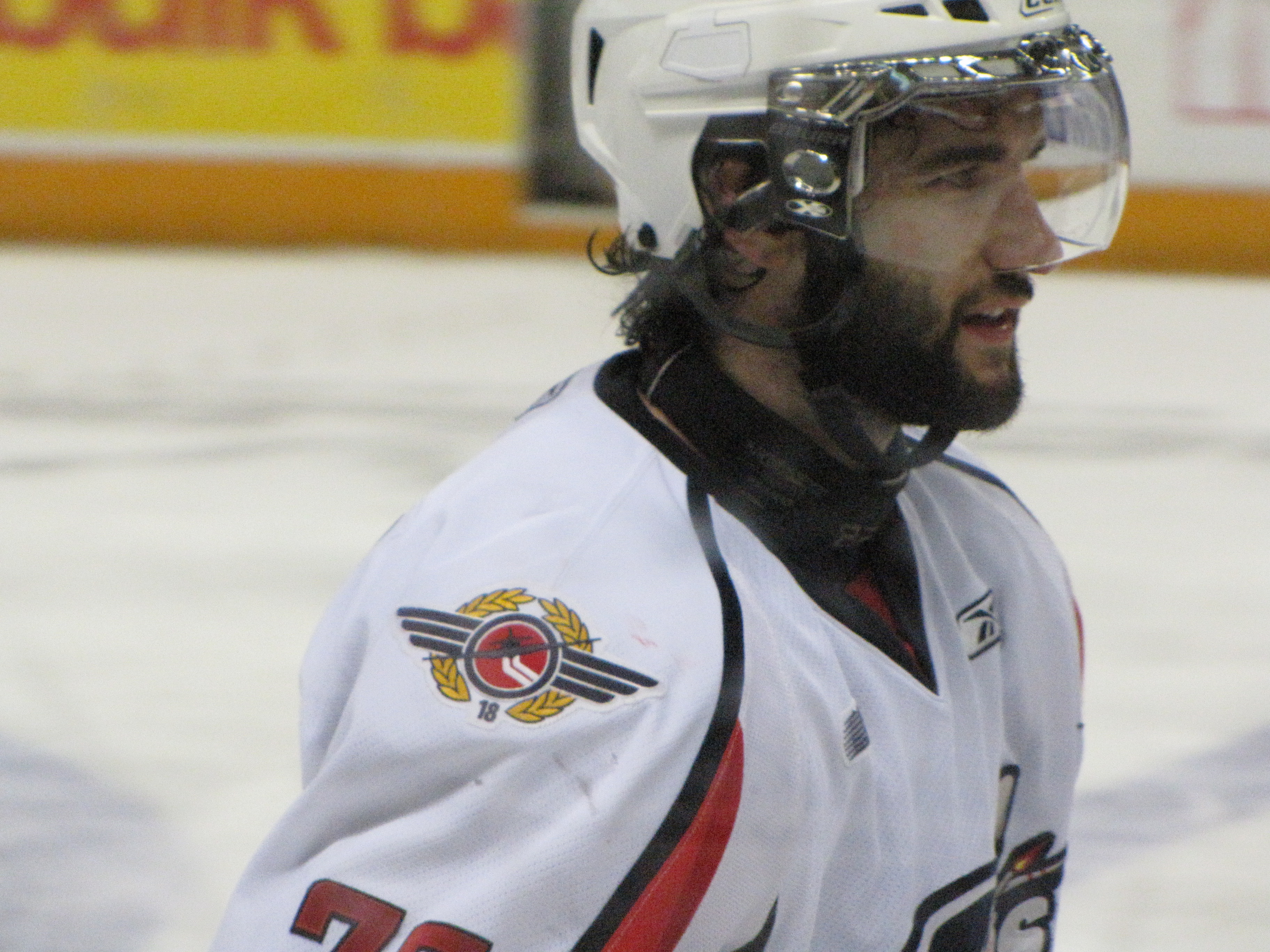
Timmins with the Windsor Spitfires in 2010

			Regular season					Playoffs
Season	Team	League	GP	G	A	Pts	PIM	GP	G	A	Pts	PIM
2004–05	Hamilton Reps	MHAO	68	30	39	69	52	—	—	—	—	—
2005–06	Burlington Cougars	OPJHL	31	8	4	12	8	4	1	1	2	0
2006–07	Kitchener Rangers	OHL	42	2	5	7	8	—	—	—	—	—
2007–08	Kitchener Rangers	OHL	62	17	12	29	46	20	3	5	8	10
2008–09	Kitchener Rangers	OHL	38	25	24	49	28	—	—	—	—	—
2008–09	Windsor Spitfires	OHL	28	10	14	24	33	20	6	10	16	26
2009–10	Windsor Spitfires	OHL	56	30	24	54	47	19	11	11	22	18
2010–11	Rochester Americans	AHL	45	10	12	22	18	—	—	—	—	—
2010–11	Florida Panthers	NHL	19	1	0	1	8	—	—	—	—	—
2011–12	San Antonio Rampage	AHL	70	11	16	27	34	10	1	0	1	8
2012–13	San Antonio Rampage	AHL	65	11	13	24	58	—	—	—	—	—
2012–13	Florida Panthers	NHL	5	0	0	0	4	—	—	—	—	—
2013–14	Albany Devils	AHL	61	13	26	39	26	4	0	0	0	7
2014–15	Albany Devils	AHL	41	10	16	26	8	—	—	—	—	—
2015–16	San Jose Barracuda	AHL	45	4	7	11	14	4	0	0	0	0
2016–17	Straubing Tigers	DEL	46	12	15	27	12	1	1	1	2	8
2017–18	Dornbirn Bulldogs	EBEL	52	18	26	44	18	6	1	1	2	4
2018–19	Dornbirn Bulldogs	EBEL	52	19	19	38	22	—	—	—	—	—
2019–20	Fehérvár AV19	EBEL	47	16	11	27	12	—	—	—	—	—
2020–21	Eispiraten Crimmitschau	DEL2	29	9	17	26	12	—	—	—	—	—
2021–22	Eispiraten Crimmitschau "A"	DEL2	44	17	17	34	10	4	0	0	0	8
2021–22	Melbourne Mustangs	AIHL	16	23	18	41	31	1	0	1	1	2
2022–23	Melbourne Mustangs	AIHL	26	33	49	82	16	3	2	2	4	2
NHL totals			24	1	0	1	12	—	—	—	—	—
