= Kaisa Pajusalu =

Estonian rower

Personal information
- Nationality: Estonian
- Born: 19 February 1989 (age 37) Pärnu, Estonia
- Education: Pärnu Ülejõe School; Estonian University of Life Sciences
- Occupation: Rowing coach

Sport
- Country: Estonia
- Sport: Women's rowing
- Club: Pärnu Sõudekeskus Kalev
- Team: Estonian Rowing Team
- Coached by: Roman Lutoškin; Matti Killing
- Retired: 2015
Medal record
Women's rowing
Representing Estonia
European Championships
Bronze medal – third place	2012 Varese	Single sculls
U23 World Championship
Silver medal – second place	2009 Račice	Single Sculls
Silver medal – second place	2010 Brest	Single Sculls
Bronze medal – third place	2011 Amsterdam	Single Sculls
Junior World Championship
Gold medal – first place	2006 Amsterdam	Double Sculls
Silver medal – second place	2007 Beijing	Double Sculls

Kaisa Pajusalu (born 19 February 1989, in Pärnu, Estonia) is a former Estonian rower.

== Rowing career ==
She has won two medals at the Junior World Championship in the double sculls event with Jevgenia Rõndina. In 2009 and 2010 Pajusalu also won a silver medal at the U23 World Championships in the single sculls event. She is also a four-time World champion and four-time European champion in indoor rowing and a multiple winner of the ALFA indoor rowing competition.

== Achievements ==
- European Championship Medals: 1 Bronze
- U23 World Championship Medals: 2 Silver, 1 Bronze
- Junior World Championship Medals: 1 Gold, 1 Silver

=== World Rowing Championships ===
- 2007 – 14th, Double sculls (with Jevgenia Rõndina)
- 2009 – 11th, Single sculls
- 2011 – 12th, Single sculls
- 2014 – 21st, Double sculls (with Marliis Reinkort)

=== European Rowing Championships ===
- 2008 – 14th, Single sculls
- 2009 – 6th, Double sculls (with Sille Vaiksaar)
- 2010 – 6th, Single sculls
- 2011 – 7th, Single sculls
- 2012 – Bronze, Single sculls
- 2013 – 7th, Single sculls
- 2014 – 14th, Single sculls

=== U23 World Rowing Championships ===
- 2006 – 5th, Double sculls (with Jevgenia Rõndina)
- 2008 – 5th, Single sculls
- 2009 – Silver, Single sculls
- 2010 – Silver, Single sculls
- 2011 – Bronze, Single sculls

=== Junior World Rowing Championships ===
- 2004 – 7th, Single sculls
- 2005 – 8th, Single sculls
- 2006 – Gold, Double sculls (with Jevgenia Rõndina)
- 2007 – Silver, Double sculls (with Jevgenia Rõndina)

=== Rowing World Cup ===
Kaisa Pajusalu Rowing World Cup appearances
#	Date	Venue	Country	Position	Class	Crew
2007
1.	22–24 June 2007	Bosbaan, Amsterdam	Netherlands	FB 8th	Double scull	(b) Kaisa Pajusalu, (s) Jevgenia Rõndina
2008
2.	30 May–1 June 2008	Rotsee, Lucerne	Switzerland	FC 13th	Double scull	(b) Kaisa Pajusalu, (s) Jevgenia Rõndina
2009
3.	10–12 July 2009	Rotsee, Lucerne	Switzerland	FB 10th	Single scull	Kaisa Pajusalu
2010
4.	18–20 June 2010	Oberschleissheim, Munich	Germany	FC 13th	Single scull	Kaisa Pajusalu
5.	9–11 July 2010	Rotsee, Lucerne	Switzerland	FC 14th	Single scull	Kaisa Pajusalu
2011
6.	27–29 May 2011	Oberschleissheim, Munich	Germany	FC 15th	Single scull	Kaisa Pajusalu
7.	17–19 June 2011	Allermöhe, Hamburg	Germany	FB 9th	Single scull	Kaisa Pajusalu
8.	8–10 July 2010	Rotsee, Lucerne	Switzerland	FB 12th	Single scull	Kaisa Pajusalu
2012
9.	4–6 May 2012	Sava, Belgrade	Serbia	FB 9th	Single scull	Kaisa Pajusalu
2013
10.	22–24 March 2013	Penrith, Sydney	Australia	FA 5th	Single scull	Kaisa Pajusalu
11.	21–23 June 2013	Dorney Lake, Eton	(United Kingdom) Great Britain	FB 10th	Single scull	Kaisa Pajusalu
2014
12.	28–30 March 2014	Penrith, Sydney	Australia	FB 8th	Single scull	Kaisa Pajusalu
13.	20–22 June 2014	Lac d'Aiguebelette, Aiguebelette	France	FC 18th	Single scull	Kaisa Pajusalu
14.	11–13 July 2014	Rotsee, Lucerne	Switzerland	FC 14th	Double scull	(b) Kaisa Pajusalu, (s) Marliis Reinkort

== Personal ==
Her older brother Raimo is a former volleyball player who played professionally in Estonia, Austria, Belgium and France. He was a member of the Estonian national team from 2000 to 2014 and represented his country at the 2009 and 2011 European Volleyball Championships.

Awards
Preceded by Liane Pintsaar	Estonian Young Sports Personality of the Year; 2010	Succeeded by Grit Šadeiko
