= Dougie Hamilton =

Canadian ice hockey player (born 1993)

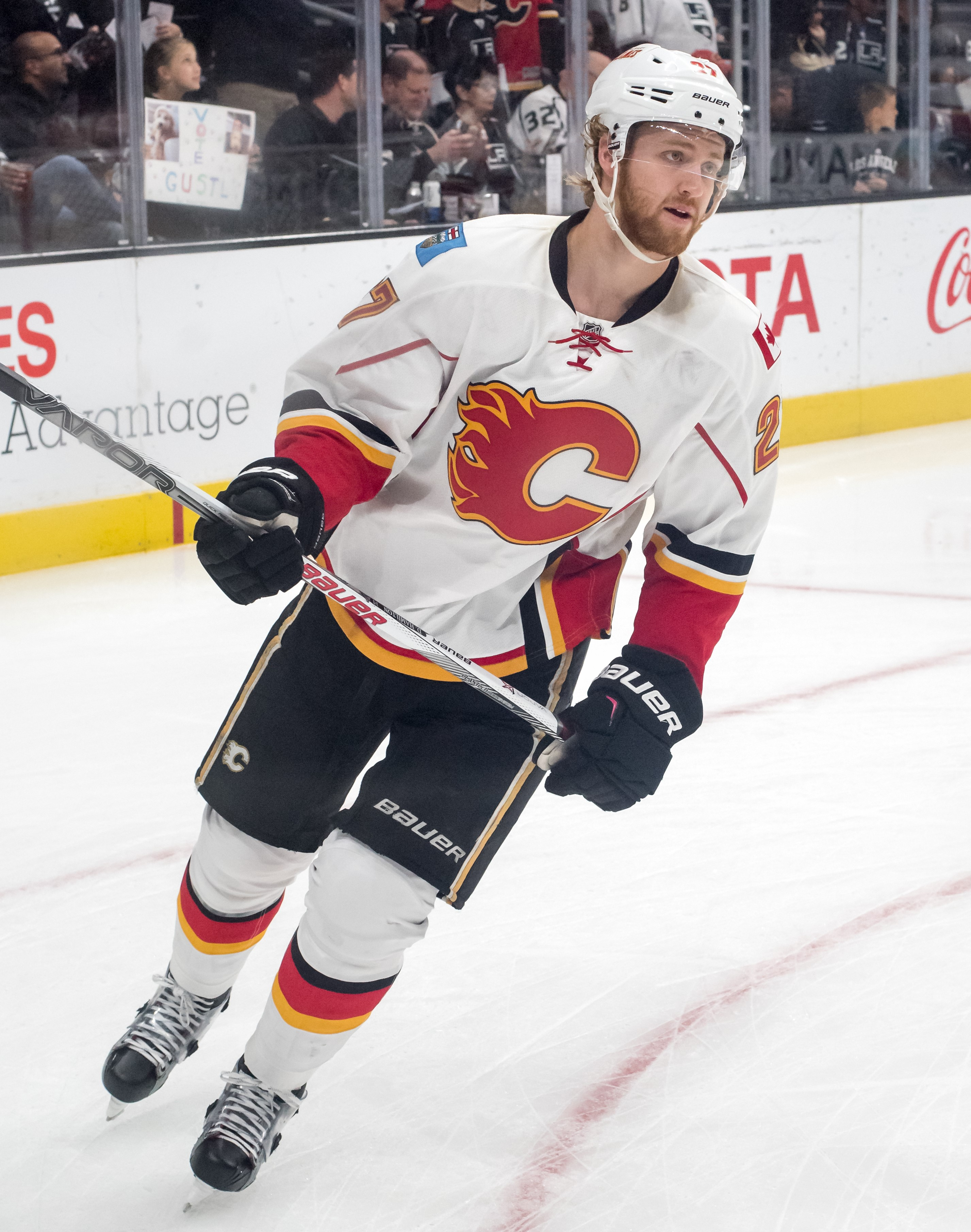
- Hamilton with the Calgary Flames in 2016
- Born: June 17, 1993 (age 33) Toronto, Ontario, Canada
- Height: 6 ft 6 in (198 cm)
- Weight: 229 lb (104 kg; 16 st 5 lb)
- Position: Defence
- Shoots: Right
- NHL team Former teams: New Jersey Devils; Boston Bruins; Calgary Flames; Carolina Hurricanes
- NHL draft: 9th overall, 2011; Boston Bruins
- Playing career: 2013–present

Douglas Jonathan Hamilton (born June 17, 1993) is a Canadian professional ice hockey player who is a defenceman for the New Jersey Devils of the National Hockey League (NHL). He previously played in the NHL for the Boston Bruins, Calgary Flames, and Carolina Hurricanes. The Bruins selected him in the first round, ninth overall, of the 2011 NHL entry draft.

== Early life ==
Hamilton was born on June 17, 1993, in Toronto, Ontario. Both of his parents participated in the 1984 Olympic Games in Los Angeles: his father Doug was a rower in the men's quadruple sculls, while his mother Lynn was a point guard for the Canadian women's basketball team. As a result, Hamilton and his older brother Freddie were exposed to many different sports in their childhoods, from which both developed a passion for ice hockey. He spent three years at Crestwood Preparatory College, after which the Hamiltons moved from Toronto to St. Catharines and he transferred to Governor Simcoe Secondary School. Hamilton played minor ice hockey for the St. Catharines Falcons of the Ontario Minor Hockey Association, where he scored 20 goals and 53 points during the 2008–09 season.

== Playing career ==
=== Amateur ===
He was selected by his hometown Niagara IceDogs of the Ontario Hockey League (OHL) in the second round, 27th overall, of the 2009 OHL Priority Selection.

Hamilton played for the Icedogs for three-and-a-half seasons. During his time, he was teammates with future NHL players such as Ryan Strome, Andrew Shaw and Brett Ritchie. Hamilton was also teammates with his older brother Freddie, who was a fifth-round selection of the San Jose Sharks in the 2010 NHL entry draft.

Hamilton was ranked fourth by the NHL Central Scouting Bureau for North American skaters for the 2011 NHL entry draft. Hamilton was drafted ninth overall by the Boston Bruins.

On December 8, 2011, Hamilton signed a three-year, entry-level contract with the Bruins.

=== Professional ===
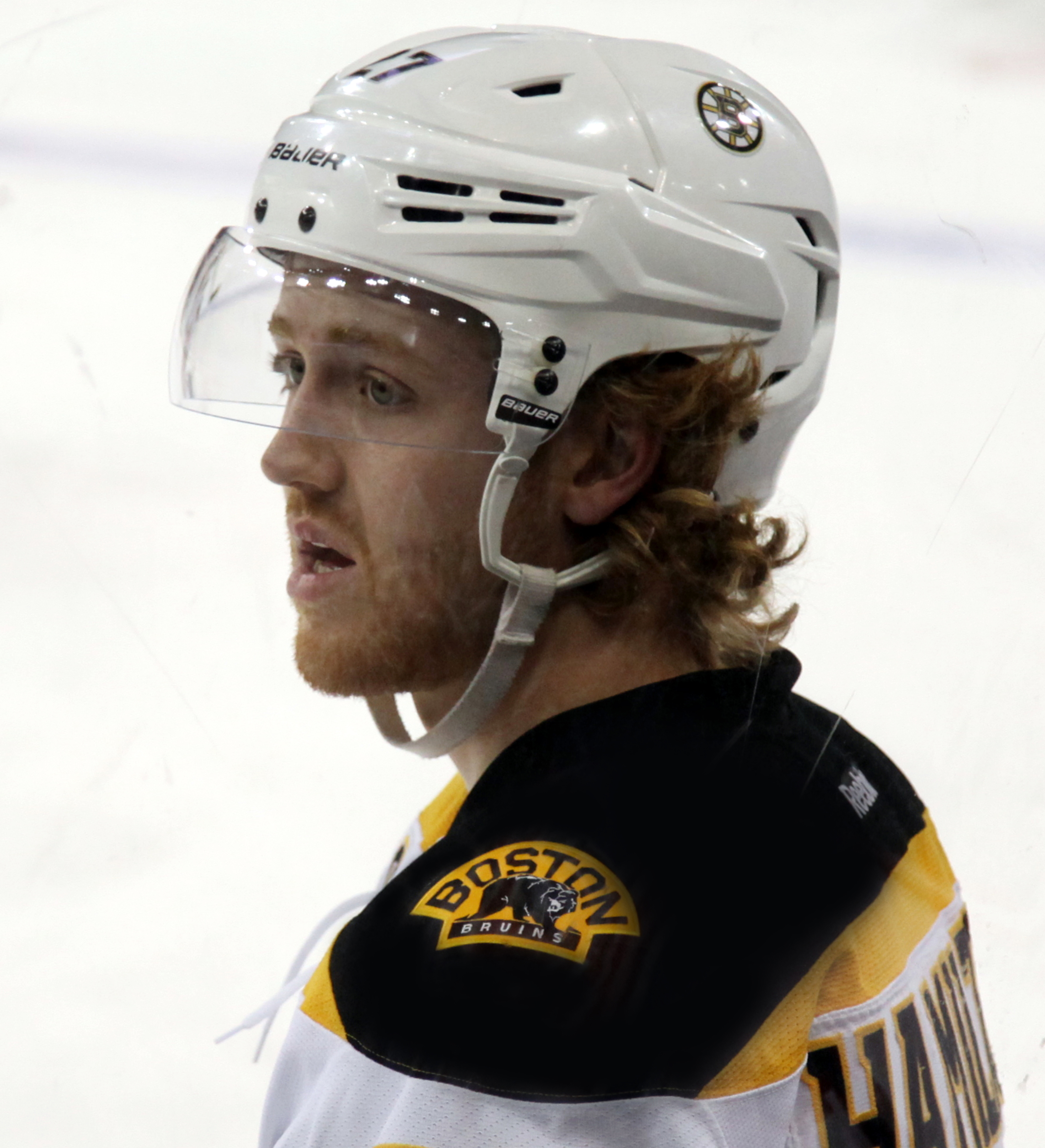
Hamilton as a member of the Boston Bruins.

==== Boston Bruins (2013–2015) ====
Hamilton began the 2012–13 season with the IceDogs. However, he was recalled by the Bruins to play for the club during the NHL's lockout-shortened season. On January 19, 2013, Hamilton made his NHL debut for the Bruins in a 3–1 victory against the New York Rangers, and two games later, on January 23, Hamilton scored his first NHL point for an assist in an overtime loss against the Rangers in Madison Square Garden. On February 15, Hamilton scored his first career NHL goal against Ryan Miller of the Buffalo Sabres. Hamilton made his Stanley Cup playoff debut on May 3, replacing defenceman Andrew Ference, who was serving a one-game suspension for his illegal hit on Toronto Maple Leafs forward Mikhail Grabovski. On April 25, Hamilton was named the 44th Annual NESN 7th Player recipient, an award given to the Bruin who most exceeded all expectations that season, as voted by the team's fans.

==== Calgary Flames (2015–2018) ====
On June 26, 2015, during the 2015 NHL entry draft, as an impending restricted free agent on July 1 and with the Bruins facing salary cap constraints, Hamilton was traded to the Calgary Flames in exchange for a first-round draft pick (used to select Zachary Senyshyn) and two second-round picks (used to select Jakob Forsbacka Karlsson and Jérémy Lauzon), all in the 2015 draft. Four days later, on June 30, Hamilton signed a six-year, $34.5 million contract with the Flames worth $5.75 million annually.

During the 2016–17 season, Hamilton was paired with Mark Giordano, prompting greater defensive play in both players. The pairing helped the Flames make the playoffs for the second time in three years. The playoffs were short-lived for the Flames, who lost to the Anaheim Ducks in four games. On February 17, 2018, Hamilton played in his 400th NHL game during which he recorded his first NHL hat-trick.

==== Carolina Hurricanes (2018–2021) ====
On June 23, 2018, Hamilton was traded to the Carolina Hurricanes (along with teammate Micheal Ferland and prospect Adam Fox) in exchange for Elias Lindholm and Noah Hanifin. After a respectable first season with Carolina, Hamilton began the 2019–20 season playing some of the best hockey of his career before his regular season was cut short when he broke his fibula on January 16, 2020. He finished the regular season scoring 40 points in 47 games played. As a result of the COVID-19 pandemic, the NHL season was paused, and delayed for several months allowing Hamilton to return for Carolina's final five games of the 2020 Stanley Cup playoffs. Despite missing several months of games due to his injury, Hamilton finished seventh in James Norris Memorial Trophy voting. Coming back from injury while playing on an expiring contract, Hamilton had another stellar year, finishing the 2020–21 season fourth in Norris Trophy voting.

==== New Jersey Devils (2021–present) ====
After three productive seasons with the Hurricanes, Hamilton left the club as a free agent and on July 28, 2021, he signed a seven-year, $63 million contract with the New Jersey Devils.

On November 28, 2023, in a game against the New York Islanders, Hamilton suffered a torn left pectoral. Following successful surgery he was placed on injured reserve, expected to be out indefinitely. With another injury in March 2025, Hamilton later came back on April 16 in the last regular season game to face the Detroit Red Wings.

== International play ==
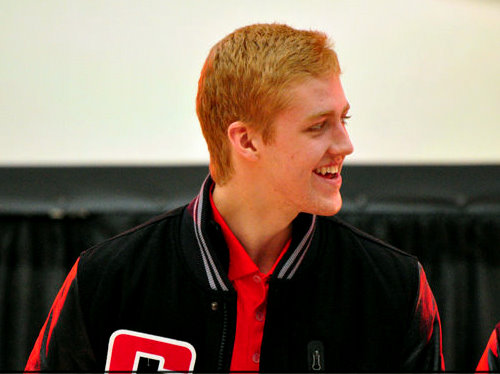
- Hamilton as a member of Canada at the 2012 World Junior Championships

Medal record

Men's ice hockey

Representing Canada

World Junior Championships
Bronze medal – third place	2012 Canada	

Hamilton played for Canada junior team at the 2012 World Junior Championships and won the bronze medal. He then played for the team in the following tournament, where Canada finished fourth.

== Personal life ==
After retiring from professional athletics, Hamilton's father became a lawyer and an athletic executive, serving as chair of the 2022 Canada Summer Games. His older brother Freddie was drafted by the San Jose Sharks in 2010 and played for the Colorado Avalanche, Calgary Flames, and Arizona Coyotes. After his release from the Coyotes in 2018, Freddie retired from hockey and returned to school to pursue his Master of Business Administration from Yale University.

== Career statistics ==
=== Regular season and playoffs ===
			Regular season					Playoffs
Season	Team	League	GP	G	A	Pts	PIM	GP	G	A	Pts	PIM
2008–09	St. Catharines Falcons AAA	SCT U16	67	20	33	53	26	—	—	—	—	—
2009–10	Niagara IceDogs	OHL	64	3	13	16	36	5	0	1	1	4
2010–11	Niagara IceDogs	OHL	67	12	46	58	77	14	4	12	16	16
2011–12	Niagara IceDogs	OHL	50	17	55	72	47	20	5	18	23	16
2012–13	Niagara IceDogs	OHL	32	8	33	41	32	—	—	—	—	—
2012–13	Boston Bruins	NHL	42	5	11	16	14	7	0	3	3	0
2013–14	Boston Bruins	NHL	64	7	18	25	40	12	2	5	7	14
2014–15	Boston Bruins	NHL	72	10	32	42	41	—	—	—	—	—
2015–16	Calgary Flames	NHL	82	12	31	43	46	—	—	—	—	—
2016–17	Calgary Flames	NHL	81	13	37	50	64	4	0	1	1	8
2017–18	Calgary Flames	NHL	82	17	27	44	64	—	—	—	—	—
2018–19	Carolina Hurricanes	NHL	82	18	21	39	54	15	3	4	7	10
2019–20	Carolina Hurricanes	NHL	47	14	26	40	32	5	1	1	2	4
2020–21	Carolina Hurricanes	NHL	55	10	32	42	35	11	2	3	5	12
2021–22	New Jersey Devils	NHL	62	9	21	30	34	—	—	—	—	—
2022–23	New Jersey Devils	NHL	82	22	52	74	50	12	1	3	4	2
2023–24	New Jersey Devils	NHL	20	5	11	16	20	—	—	—	—	—
2024–25	New Jersey Devils	NHL	64	9	31	40	30	5	0	2	2	6
2025–26	New Jersey Devils	NHL	77	12	27	39	50	—	—	—	—	—
NHL totals			912	163	377	540	574	71	9	22	31	56

=== International ===
Year	Team	Event	Result	GP	G	A	Pts	PIM
2010	Canada Ontario	U17	2nd place, silver medalist(s)	6	0	1	1	0
2010	Canada	IH18	1st place, gold medalist(s)	5	1	2	3	2
2012	Canada	WJC	3rd place, bronze medalist(s)	6	2	4	6	6
2013	Canada	WJC	4th	6	1	1	2	0
Junior totals				23	4	8	12	8

== Awards and honours ==
Award	Year	Ref
OHL
Ivan Tennant Memorial Award	2009–10	
OHL Second Team All-Star	2010–11	
Bobby Smith Trophy	2010–11	
CHL Scholastic Player of the Year	2010–11	
OHL First Team All-Star	2011–12	
Max Kaminsky Trophy	2011–12	
CHL Defenceman of the Year	2011–12	
NHL
All-Star Game	2020 (Note: Did not play)	
Second All-Star Team	2021	
Boston Bruins
Seventh Player Award	2012–13	
Calgary Flames
J. R. "Bud" McCaig Award	2016–17	

== Notes ==
Awards and achievements
Preceded by Tyler Seguin	Boston Bruins first-round draft pick 2011	Succeeded by Malcolm Subban
