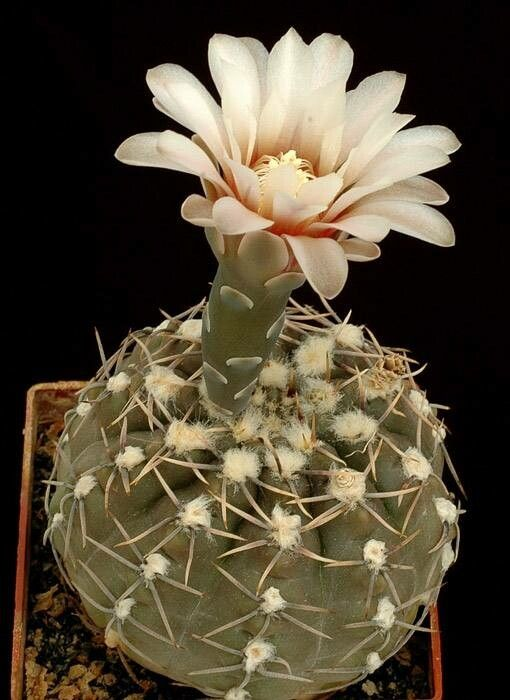
- Gymnocalycium kieslingii

Conservation status
- Least Concern (IUCN 3.1)

Scientific classification
- Kingdom: Plantae
- Clade: Tracheophytes
- Clade: Angiosperms
- Clade: Eudicots
- Order: Caryophyllales
- Family: Cactaceae
- Subfamily: Cactoideae
- Genus: Gymnocalycium
- Species: G. kieslingii

Binomial name
- Gymnocalycium kieslingii O.Ferrari 1985

Synonyms
- Gymnocalycium frankianum Rausch ex H.Till & Amerh. 2007; Gymnocalycium kieslingii f. alboareolatum O.Ferrari 1985; Gymnocalycium kieslingii subsp. castaneum (O.Ferrari) Slaba 2012; Gymnocalycium kieslingii f. castaneum O.Ferrari 1985; Gymnocalycium kieslingii subsp. frankianum (Rausch ex H.Till & Amerh.) Slaba 2012

= Gymnocalycium kieslingii =

Species of cactus

Gymnocalycium kieslingii is a species of cactus in the genus Gymnocalycium, endemic to Argentina.

== Description ==
Gymnocalycium kieslingii is a small, solitary cactus. Its shoots are gray-green, flattened, and slightly depressed spheres, measuring up to 2 centimeters in height and 6 to 9 centimeters in diameter. The cactus has 12 rounded ribs (though it can have between 9 and 13), which are low and separated by distinct furrows. The cactus features five to nine slightly curved spines that are whitish with pink bases. These spines lie flat against the shoots and range from 5 to 8 millimeters in length. The flowers of Gymnocalycium kieslingii are bell- to funnel-shaped, white, and can grow up to 6 centimeters long and 5 to 6 centimeters wide. Its spindle-shaped fruits can reach up to 3.5 centimeters in length and 1 centimeter in diameter.

== Distribution and habitat ==
This cactus is typically found in the mountain foothills and under shrubs in the La Rioja province of Argentina, usually at elevations between 500 and 1700 meters.

== Taxonomy ==
Gymnocalycium kieslingii was first described in 1985 by Omar Ferrari, and its specific name honors Argentine botanist and cactus expert Roberto Kiesling.
