= Montesi =

Montesi is an Italian surname. Notable people with the surname include:

- Greg Montesi (born 1959), American rower
- Maurizio Montesi (born 1952), Italian gymnast
- Wilma Montesi (1932–1953), Italian woman murdered in Rome

== Fictional characters ==
- Victoria Montesi, a character in the Marvel Comics universe
