= Romoli =

Romoli is a surname. Notable people with the surname include:

- Emanuele Romoli (born 1957), Italian indoor rower
- Ettore Romoli (1938–2018), Italian politician
- Francesco Romoli (born 1977), Italian artist
- Pedro Rómoli (born 1971), Argentine football player
