= CRASH-B Sprints =

International indoor rowing championships

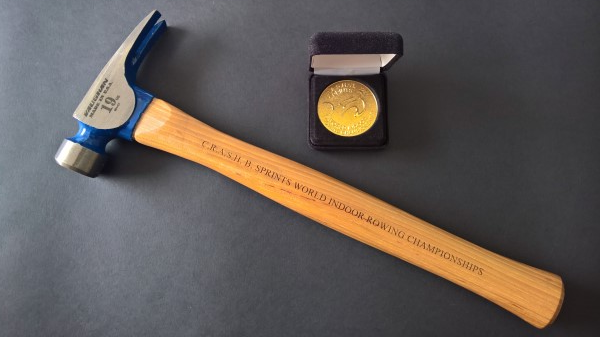
Hammers are awarded as trophies.

The CRASH-B Sprints World Indoor Rowing Championships (CRASH-B Sprints) was the world championship for indoor rowing, raced over a distance of 2,000m. The regatta is sponsored by Concept2, and raced on their C2 rowers. Originally held in Harvard's Newell Boathouse, the regatta moved in turn to the Malkin Athletic Center, the Radcliff Quadrangle Athletic Center, MIT's Rockwell Cage, Harvard's Indoor Track Facility, the Reggie Lewis Track and Athletic Center, Boston University's Agganis Arena, and in 2019, to the Boston University Track and Tennis Center. The regatta is held in late February each year.

Competitors are 12 years old and up, including adaptive categories. In 2019 there was an age group for 90–94 years old.

The race was started in 1980 by a group of US Olympic and World Team rowers. The CRASH-B Sprints are officially sponsored by Concept 2. Originally, the acronym for the race, C.R.A.S.H.-B., stood for the Charles River Association of Sculling Has-Beens. It was later changed to the Charles River All-Star Has-Beens. The racing format has evolved over the history of the event. Now, all athletes race a single distance of 2,000 meters. Previously, the regatta involved multiple heats, finals, and longer distances (2,500 meters, 5 miles, and 6 miles).

== Winners ==
=== Open Men ===
Year	Athlete	Time	Distance
1982	(United States) Phil Stekl/Eric Stevens	7:49.0	2500 m
1983	(United States) Ridgely Johnson	7:44.0	2500 m
1984	(United States) Ridgely Johnson	7:41.9	2500 m
1985	(United States) Andrew Sudduth	7:56.3	2500 m
1986	(United States) Ridgely Johnson	7:35.0	2500 m
1987	(United States) Andrew Sudduth	7:38.8	2500 m
1988	(United States) Andrew Sudduth	7:27.2	2500 m
1989	(West Germany) Matthias Siejkowski	7:15.5	2500 m
1990	(United States) Tom Bohrer	7:22.4	2500 m
1991	(United Kingdom) Steve Redgrave	7:27.1	2500 m
1992	(Germany) Matthias Siejkowski	7:19.2	2500 m
1993	(Germany) Matthias Siejkowski	7:24.0	2500 m
1994	(Germany) Matthias Siejkowski	7:23.1	2500 m
1995	(Germany) Matthias Siejkowski	7:24.3	2500 m
1996	(Finland) Klaus Geiger	5:50.6	2000 m
1997	(Germany) Matthias Siejkowski	5:39.7	2000 m
1998	(New Zealand) Rob Waddell	5:39.5	2000 m
1999	(New Zealand) Rob Waddell	5:40.4	2000 m
2000	(New Zealand) Rob Waddell	5:39.5	2000 m
2001	(Germany) Matthias Siejkowski	5:42.2	2000 m
2002	(United States) Jamie Schroeder	5:50.3	2000 m
2003	(United States) Jamie Schroeder	5:46.7	2000 m
2004	(Belarus) Pavel Shurmei	5:39.6	2000 m
2005	(Belarus) Pavel Shurmei	5:43.2	2000 m
2006	(United Kingdom) Graham Benton	5:46.4	2000 m
2007	(United States) Mark Flickinger	5.46.6	2000 m
2008	(Italy) Paolo Loriato	5:52.4	2000 m
2009	(France) Cedric Berrest	5:48.9	2000 m
2010	(Germany) Tim Grohmann	5:48.7	2000 m
2011	(Canada) Conlin McCabe	5:48.0	2000 m
2012	(Mexico) Juan Carlos Cabrera	5:55.1	2000 m
2013	(United States) Christian Kader	5:52.1	2000 m
2014	(Canada) Andrew Stewart-Jones (rower)	5:47.7	2000 m
2015	(Cuba) Ángel Fournier	5:45.9	2000 m
2016	(United States) James Letten (rower)	5:49.4*	2000 m
2017	(Poland) Bartosz Zablocki	5:45.8	2000 m
2018	(United States) Andrew Raitto	5:54.8	2000 m
2019	(United States) Wesley Vear	5:59.2	2000 m
2020	(United States) Marqus Brown	6:00.2	2000 m
2021	(United States) Isaiah Harrison	5:48.9	2000 m
2022	(United States) Isaiah Harrison	5:53.2	2000 m
2023	(United States) Willem Drescher	6:08.5	2000 m

=== Open Women ===
Year	Athlete	Time	Distance
1982	(United States) Carie Graves	8:52.5	2500 m
1983	(United States) Carie Graves	8:53.2	2500 m
1984	(United States) Carie Graves	8:55.4	2500 m
1985	(United States) Jeannie Flanagan	9:01.1	2500 m
1986	(United States) Barb Kirch	8:52.2	2500 m
1987	(United States) Barb Kirch	8:43.6	2500 m
1988	(United States) S. Carlson	8:36.8	2500 m
1989	(United States) Amy Fuller	8:15.5	2500 m
1990	(East Germany) Kathrin Boron	8:27.2	2500 m
1991	(United States) Amy Fuller	8:31.0	2500 m
1992	(United States) Amy Fuller	8:26.3	2500 m
1993	(France) Helen Cortin	8:32.4	2500 m
1994	(Sweden) Maria Brandin	8:13.6	2500 m
1995	(Sweden) Maria Brandin	8:12.5	2500 m
1996	(United States) Sara Field	6:54.8	2000 m
1997	(Denmark) Sarah Lauritzen	6:36.8	2000 m
1998	(Bulgaria) Ivelina Boteva	6:37.9	2000 m
1999	(United Kingdom) Catherine Bishop	6:37.4	2000 m
2000	(United States) Amy Fuller	6:32.3	2000 m
2001	(Netherlands) Hurnet Dekkers	6:35.4	2000 m
2002	(New Zealand) Georgina Evers-Swindell	6:30.8	2000 m
2003	(Belgium) Irja Ven	6:43.2	2000 m
2004	(United States) Maria Stevens	6:40.9	2000 m
2005	(New Zealand) Georgina Evers-Swindell	6:33.2	2000 m
2006	(South Africa) Rika Geyser	6:40.2	2000 m
2007	(Canada) Anna-Marie DeZwager	6:43.3	2000 m
2008	(Australia) Tess Gerrand	6:43.2	2000 m
2009	(Estonia) Kaisa Pajusalu	6:49.0	2000 m
2010	(Canada) Carolyn Ganes	6:40.4	2000 m
2011	(Estonia) Kaisa Pajusalu	6:41.3	2000 m
2012	(Estonia) Kaisa Pajusalu	6:37.3	2000 m
2013	(Ukraine) Olena Buryak	6:31.6	2000 m
2014	(United States) Madeline Turbes	6:41.8	2000 m
2015	(Estonia) Kaisa Pajusalu	6:43.6	2000 m
2016	(United States) Michelle Lazorchak	6:43.1	2000 m
2017	(Ukraine) Olena Buryak	6:33.0	2000 m
2018	(United States) Kelly Albanir	6:53.2	2000 m
2019	(United States) Caryn Davies	6:53.2	2000 m
2020	(United States) Gabriela Thomas	6:55.9	2000 m
2021	(United States) Bianca Piloseno	6:51.6	2000 m
2022	(United States) Maddy Focht	6:58.5	2000 m
2023	(United States) Elizabeth Gilmore (rower)	6:53.3	2000 m

*The fastest time of the day occurred in the Men's Heavyweight ages 40–49 category, in which Graham Benton won in a world record (for that category) time of 5:48.3.
