= Niagara IceDogs =

Ontario Hockey League team in St. Catharines

- City: St. Catharines, Ontario
- League: Ontario Hockey League
- Conference: Eastern
- Division: Central
- Founded: 1998–99
- Home arena: Meridian Centre
- Colours: Red, black, white
- General manager: Frank Evola
- Head coach: Krys Barch
- Affiliates: St. Catharines Falcons
- Website: www.niagaraicedogs.net

Franchise history
- 1998–2007: Mississauga IceDogs
- 2007–present: Niagara IceDogs

Current uniform

The Niagara IceDogs are a major junior ice hockey team in the Ontario Hockey League based in St. Catharines, Ontario, Canada. The franchise was originally known as the Mississauga IceDogs and founded in 1996. The team was relocated to St. Catharines and played its inaugural season in the Niagara region during the 2007–08 OHL season after nine seasons in Mississauga. In 2022, the team was acquired by majority owner Darren DeDobbelaer and minority owner Wayne Gretzky.

== History ==
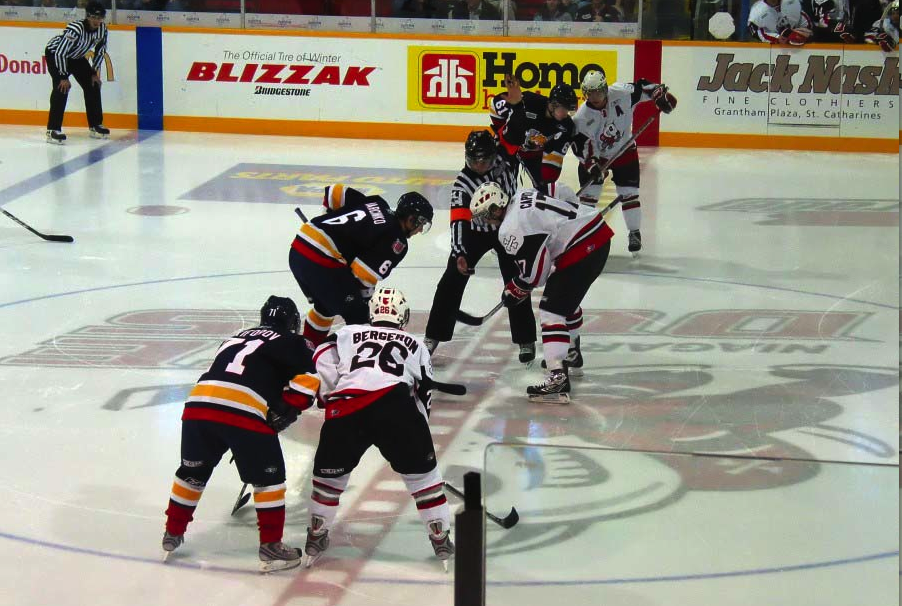
Niagara IceDogs in action at home versus the Barrie Colts.

=== Early years, 1998-2007 ===
The Mississauga IceDogs inaugural season began in 1998–99, and the team struggled, winning only 4 of 68 games. In their first three seasons, the IceDogs won a total of 16 games, in 204 games played. Don Cherry had co-founded the team and coached the team for a season. In 2002 alongside the three other partners they sold all ownership to venture capitalist Joel Albin. The nine season tenure in Mississauga saw the IceDogs finish with a .301 win percentage in 612 regular season games and win one Central Division and Eastern Conference Championship.

==== Relocation ====
On July 12, 2006, Eugene Melnyk, who owned the Toronto St. Michael's Majors, bought the Mississauga IceDogs. After the 2006–07 season, Melnyk sold the IceDogs, and moved the Majors to the Hershey Centre in Mississauga. The team approached the City of St. Catharines about moving the team into Jack Gatecliff Arena. St. Catharines City Council voted on a leasing arrangement on April 23, 2007, which passed. The OHL Board of Governors approved the deal on June 5, 2007.

=== Jack Gatecliff Arena era ===
The Niagara IceDogs spent their first seven seasons in St. Catharines in the Jack Gatecliff arena. In six of the seven years at the Jack Gatecliff arena, the IceDogs led the OHL as the best attended team based on capacity percentage. During this time, the IceDogs qualified for the playoffs in every year, making it to the Eastern Conference finals twice. The IceDogs most successful year was in 2011–12 when they won both the Emms Trophy and Bobby Orr Trophy as Central Division and Eastern Conference Champions. They would ultimately fall in the finals, however, to the London Knights in five games. While playing at the Jack Gatecliff arena, Niagara's line-ups featured a number of eventual high NHL draft picks and NHL alumni. First round draft picks included Alex Pietrangelo, Mark Visentin, Ryan Strome, Dougie Hamilton and Brendan Perlini. Other notable players to play for the IceDogs at the Jack Gatecliff are Stefan Legein, Luca Caputi, Andrew Agozzino, Brett Ritchie, Jamie Oleksiak, Freddie Hamilton and Andrew Shaw, who was the first Niagara IceDogs alumnus to win the Stanley Cup.

=== Meridian Centre era ===
The IceDogs entered a new era when they relocated to the brand new Meridian Centre in St. Catharines. On October 16, 2014, the IceDogs won their first game at the Meridian Centre by a score of 7–4 against the visiting Belleville Bulls. The first goal at the new Meridian Centre was scored by Mikkel Aagaard from Denmark. While the arena's initial season saw the IceDogs go down in five games in the second round to the eventual Memorial Cup champions Oshawa Generals, the organization went all in during the 2015–16 season. While adding key veteran acquisitions as the season went on, including star goaltender Alex Nedeljkovic, a second round pick of the Carolina Hurricanes, the IceDogs once again battled their way to the OHL Finals. Niagara went on to face the London Knights, a rematch of the 2012 OHL Finals, but once again came up short, losing the series in four games. With the organization facing a rebuild after a disappointing finish to the season, the IceDogs parted ways with head coach and general manager Marty Williamson, commencing a new era for the organization after six seasons that featured two conference championships, one division championship, and six consecutive years of playoffs.

The next season saw the IceDogs go into rebuild mode, with younger key future players beginning to make the jump, like Akil Thomas, as most of the vets had moved on, aged out, or had been traded around the trade deadline for picks and prospects. They made the playoffs that year, and lost to the Peterborough Petes in the first round in 4 games. The 2017–2018 season saw them become more competitive, and around the trade deadline added some depth pieces to ensure they could be more competitive than last season's playoffs. They beat the Oshawa Generals in the first round in 5 games, and then faced off against a very good Hamilton Bulldogs team. Despite taking 3 games to overtime, they lost in 5 games.

The 2018–2019 season saw the team go all in. Along with the returning vets from last season, they acquired the likes of (eventual CHL Leading Scorer and Eddie Powers Memorial Trophy recipient) Jason Robertson, Jack Studnicka, and depth pieces like Ivan Lodnia, Jason Paquette, and Matt Brassard. The team also saw the rise of sophomore forward Philip Tomasino. The team would finish first in the OHL Central division, winning the Emms Trophy. In the playoffs, they beat the North Bay Battalion in 5 games. In the second round, they faced the Oshawa Generals. Despite going up 2–0, they proceeded to lose 4 straight ending their season. Stephen Dhillon became the winningest goalie in IceDogs history, setting a franchise record for wins in a season (38), and total wins for his time as an IceDog (98). The IceDogs finished the season with the most goals scored in the league, and in franchise history (326).

In March 2019, the OHL fined the IceDogs $250,000 and two first round draft picks for giving secret side deals to players to pay them above the OHL maximum allowed in the Standard Player Agreement. This was reduced via settlement to $150,000, its 2021 first round draft pick, and an admission that the IceDogs violated the league's player recruitment rules. The OHL had launched an investigation into the IceDogs after receiving complaints from a former player that $40,000 of orally agreed upon payments were not made by the team. Led by Toronto law firm, Lax O’Sullivan Lisus Gottlieb LLP, the report confirmed that the IceDogs made rulebreaking deals to two players and likely had more secret deals with its European players.

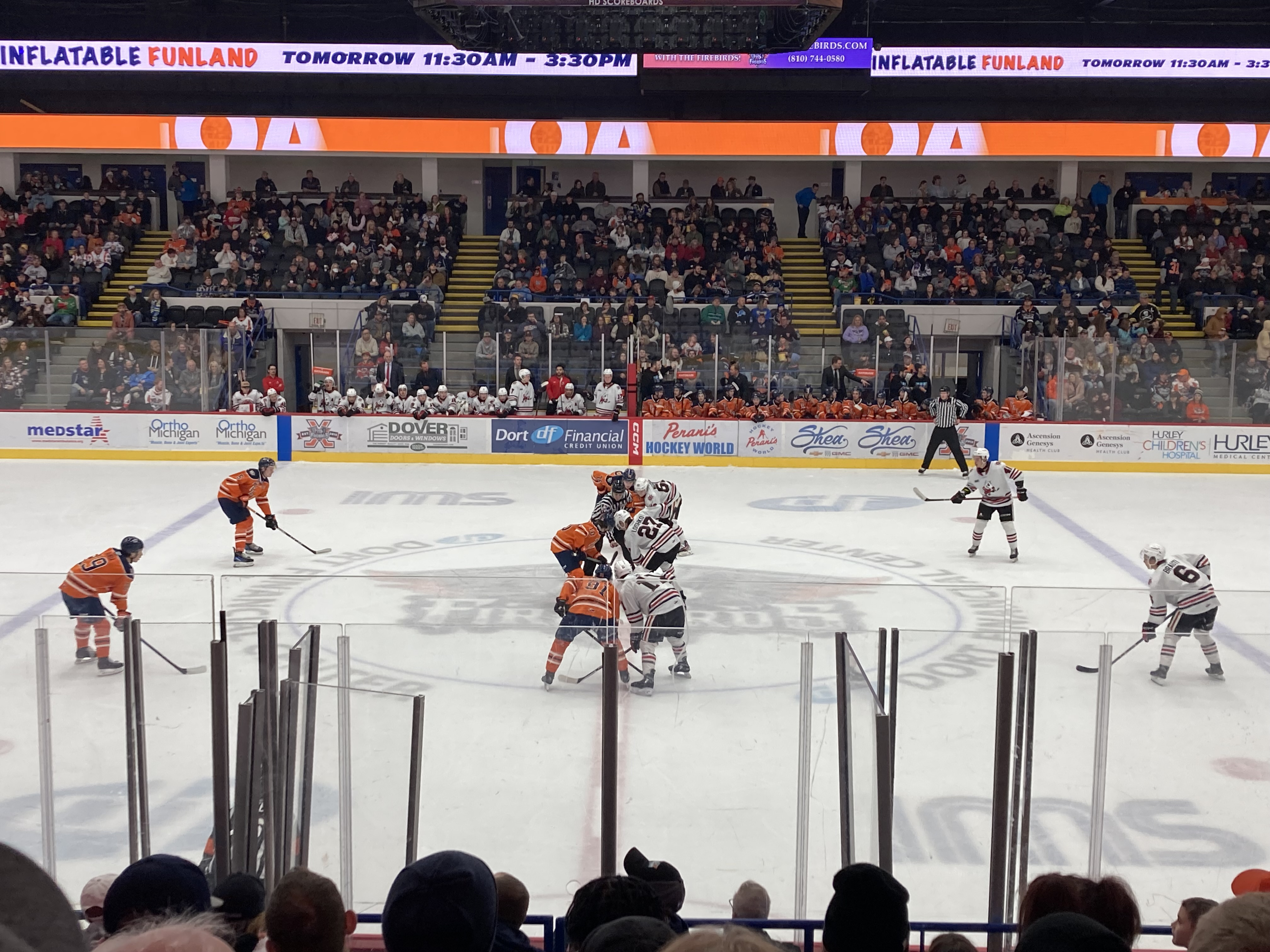
The IceDogs playing at Flint in 2024

The 2019–2020 season saw the team go into rebuild mode once again, losing key players to the NHL or simply age out of the league. At the trade deadline they traded Captain and star forward Akil Thomas and other star forward Philip Tomasino for the purposes of restocking their draft cupboard, which had been depleted the season prior. They would then name Ivan Lodnia captain for the rest of the season. The team had a scary moment when rising young goalie Tucker Tynan was involved in a freak incident during a game against the London Knights, taking a major cut to the thigh when a London Knights player drove into the net and crashed into him. The incident made headlines across Canada and the hockey community. The COVID-19 pandemic would then hit and cause the subsequent cancellation of the rest of the CHL season and then playoffs. The team finished in second last place, and chose 2nd overall in the 2020 OHL draft, where they drafted forward Pano Fimis.

=== OHL investigations and fallouts ===
Following an investigation, OHL commissioner David Branch suspended both the team's general manager Joey Burke and head coach Billy Burke indefinitely, after it was revealed the two made inappropriate comments about a female colleague via WhatsApp. The brothers, along with the IceDogs organization were fined $150,000 CDN in regards to the incident. The brothers, who also serve as minority owners, were eligible to apply for reinstatement on June 1, 2024.

Months after the investigation, Bill and Denise Burke sold the team to Darren DeDobbelaer, who became the majority owner, alongside Wayne Gretzky.

Over a year later, the IceDogs faced another third party investigation in regards to bullying and harassment on the team. As a result, team captain Landon Cato and goaltender Josh Rosenzweig were banned by the Canadian Hockey League and team owner/general manager Darren DeDobbelaer was suspended for two seasons as a result. The team was also fined $100,000 CDN and stripped of their first round pick in the 2024 OHL Priority Selection Draft.

In March 2025, OHL commissioner Bryan Crawford announced a third-party investigation was set to conduct a cultural review of the IceDogs organization, following multiple complaints of inappropriate behaviour involving team staff.

== Championships ==
Emms Trophy
Central Division Championship

- 2011–12
- 2018–19

Bobby Orr Trophy
Eastern Conference Championship

- 2011–12
- 2015–16

J. Ross Robertson Cup
Ontario Hockey League Championship

- 2011–12 : Lost to London Knights
- 2015–16 : Lost to London Knights

== Coaches ==
Mario Cicchillo was promoted from assistant coach in 2006–07 for Mississauga and became the first coach of the Niagara IceDogs after it was announced that head coach Mike Kelly resigned to accept a senior advisory position with the team. In August 2009, Cicchillo was fired and assistant coach Mike McCourt was named interim head coach. In early May 2010, the IceDogs announced that the team would not be renewing the contracts of McCourt and his assistants. Former Barrie Colts coach/general manager Marty Williamson was named coach and general manager of the IceDogs in late May 2010. With a rebuild about to begin, the IceDogs decided to part ways with Williamson in 2016 after six successful years and promoted assistant Dave Bell to head coach. In the summer of 2017, Bell left the organization after just one year as head coach to join the Ontario Reign of the American Hockey League. Billy Burke served as the head coach from 2017, until his suspension in April 2022. Daniel Fitzgerald was named head coach in July 2022.

Coach Ben Boudreau and assistants Dan Paille and Marc Slawson were fired in May 2025, following a review by the league into "complaints of inappropriate behaviour". Following another review, the team revamped their front office by naming Frank Evola general manager. Krys Barch was named head coach in June 2025.

- 2007–2009 – Mario Cicchillo
- 2009–2010 – Mike McCourt (interim)
- 2010–2016 – Marty Williamson
- 2016–2017 – Dave Bell
- 2017–2022 – Billy Burke
- 2022 – Jody Hull (interim)
- 2022 – Daniel Fitzgerald
- 2022 – Jeff Angelidis (interim)
- 2022–2023 – Ryan Kuwabara
- 2023–2025 – Ben Boudreau
- 2025–present – Krys Barch

== Players ==
=== NHL alumni ===
- Andrew Agozzino
- Darren Archibald
- Cameron Butler
- Luca Caputi
- Matt Corrente
- Vince Dunn
- Alex Friesen
- Danil Gushchin
- Dougie Hamilton
- Freddie Hamilton
- Josh Ho-Sang
- Ben Jones
- Tom Kuhnhackl
- Alex Nedeljkovic
- Jamie Oleksiak
- Brendan Perlini
- Alex Pietrangelo
- Brett Ritchie
- Jason Robertson
- Andrew Shaw
- Jeremy Smith
- Ryan Strome
- Jack Studnicka
- Akil Thomas
- Philip Tomasino
- Carter Verhaeghe
- Mark Visentin

=== First round NHL draft picks ===
List of first round NHL draft picks:

- 2008 – Alex Pietrangelo, 1st round (4th overall) St. Louis
- 2010 – Mark Visentin, 1st round (27th overall) Phoenix
- 2011 – Ryan Strome, 1st round (5th overall) New York Islanders
- 2011 – Dougie Hamilton, 1st round (9th overall) Boston
- 2014 – Brendan Perlini, 1st round (12th overall) Arizona
- 2019 – Philip Tomasino, 1st round (24th overall) Nashville

=== Award winners ===
==== Ontario Hockey League ====
Bobby Smith Trophy
Scholastic Player of the Year

- 2010–11 – Dougie Hamilton

Dave Pinkney Trophy
Lowest Team G.A.A.

- 2011–12 – Mark Visentin
  & Christopher Festarini

Eddie Powers Memorial Trophy
Top Scorer in OHL

- 2018–19 – Jason Robertson

Ivan Tennant Memorial Award
Top High School Academic Player

- 2007–08 – Alex Friesen
- 2008–09 – Freddie Hamilton
- 2009–10 – Dougie Hamilton
- 2014–15 – Stephen Dhillon

Leo Lalonde Memorial Trophy
Overage Player of the Year

- 2007–08 – Michael Swift
- 2011–12 – Andrew Agozzino

Max Kaminsky Trophy
Most Outstanding Defenceman

- 2011–12 – Dougie Hamilton

Mickey Renaud Captain's Trophy
Captain of the Year

- 2011–12 – Andrew Agozzino

OHL Executive of the Year

- 2007–08 – Denise Burke

OHL Goaltender of the Year

- 2010–11 – Mark Visentin

==== Canadian Hockey League ====
CHL Defenceman of the Year

- 2011–12 – Dougie Hamilton

CHL Scholastic Player of the Year

- 2010–11 – Dougie Hamilton

CHL Top Scorer Award

- 2018–19 – Jason Robertson

== Season-by-season results ==
Regular season and playoffs results:

Legend: GP = Games played, W = Wins, L = Losses, T = Ties, OTL = Overtime losses, SL = Shoot-out losses, Pts = Points, GF = Goals for, GA = Goals against

Memorial Cup champions	OHL champions	OHL finalists

Season	Regular season										Playoffs
Season	GP	W	L	OTL	SOL	Pts	Pct	GF	GA	Finish	Playoffs
2007–08	68	42	25	0	1	85	0.625	272	214	2nd Central	Won conference quarterfinals (Mississauga St. Michaels Majors) 4–0; Lost conference semifinals (Oshawa Generals) 2–4
2008–09	68	26	31	5	6	63	0.463	213	264	4th Central	Won conference quarterfinals (Ottawa 67's) 4–3; Lost conference semifinals (Belleville Bulls) 1–4
2009–10	68	26	34	2	6	60	0.441	191	233	4th Central	Lost conference quarterfinals (Ottawa 67's) 1–4
2010–11	68	45	17	2	4	96	0.706	273	197	2nd Central	Won conference quarterfinals (Brampton Battalion) 4–0; Won conference semifinals (Oshawa Generals) 4–1; Lost conference finals (Mississauga St. Michael's Majors) 1–4
2011–12	68	47	18	0	3	97	0.713	291	169	1st Central	Won conference quarterfinals 4–2, Oshawa Generals; Won conference semifinals (Brampton Battalion) 4–0; Won conference finals (Ottawa 67s) 4–1; Lost OHL finals (London Knights) 1–4
2012–13	68	30	34	2	2	64	0.471	227	250	4th Central	Lost conference quarterfinals (Oshawa Generals) 1–4
2013–14	68	24	35	3	6	57	0.419	223	284	4th Central	Lost conference quarterfinals (North Bay Battalion) 3–4
2014–15	68	37	27	2	2	78	0.574	274	237	3rd Central	Won conference quarterfinals (Ottawa 67's) 4–2; Lost conference semifinals (Oshawa Generals) 1–4
2015–16	68	35	26	4	3	77	0.566	213	198	3rd Central	Won conference quarterfinals (Ottawa 67's) 4–1; Won conference semifinals (Kingston Frontenacs) 4–0; Won conference finals (Barrie Colts) 4–0; Lost OHL finals (London Knights) 0–4
2016–17	68	23	35	6	4	56	0.412	207	274	3rd Central	Lost conference quarterfinals (Peterborough Petes) 0–4
2017–18	68	35	23	7	3	80	0.588	240	235	2nd Central	Won conference quarterfinals (Oshawa Generals) 4–1; Lost conference semifinals (Hamilton Bulldogs) 1–4
2018–19	68	44	17	7	0	95	0.699	326	209	1st Central	Won conference quarterfinals (North Bay Battalion) 4–1; Lost conference semifinals (Oshawa Generals) 2–4
2019–20	63	18	39	5	1	42	0.333	194	320	4th Central	Playoffs cancelled due to the COVID-19 pandemic
2020–21	Season cancelled due to the COVID-19 pandemic										
2021–22	68	22	42	3	1	48	0.353	218	316	5th Central	Did not qualify
2022–23	68	12	47	8	1	33	0.243	199	357	5th Central	Did not qualify
2023–24	68	17	43	6	2	42	0.309	193	323	5th Central	Did not qualify
2024–25	68	29	31	4	4	66	0.485	247	303	4th Central	Lost conference quarterfinals (Barrie Colts) 1–4
2025–26	68	32	30	4	2	70	0.515	211	253	3rd Central	Lost conference quarterfinals (Barrie Colts) 1–4

== Uniforms and logos ==
The IceDogs colours are red, black and white. The home jersey is black with red, black and white sleeves with two crossed dog bones on each shoulder. The away jersey is white with red, black and white sleeves with two crossed dog bones on each shoulder. The Niagara logo is a Bull Terrier (modelled after former team part-owner Don Cherry's famous dog, "Blue") playing hockey in hockey gear. The team wears red and black CCM gloves and CCM helmets (black or white, depending upon their jersey colour).

== Arenas ==
=== Meridian Centre ===
The IceDogs moved into the Meridian Centre on October 16, 2014. Located at 1 David S. Howes Way in St. Catharines, the Meridian Centre features a combination of 5,300 permanent and retractable seats.

=== Jack Gatecliff Arena ===
The Garden City Arena Complex (formerly known as the Gatorade Garden City Complex, Garden City Arena and the Jack Gatecliff Arena) is a publicly owned and operated facility in St. Catharines. It is located at 8 Gale Crescent and features two ice surfaces (the Rex Stimers Arena and the Jack Gatecliff Arena). The IceDogs played in the Jack Gatecliff Arena of the complex for 7 seasons. The arena's capacity is 3,145 including standing room, making it smaller than most CHL arenas. With an ice surface of 190 x 85 feet, its dimensions are also smaller than the typical CHL ice surface. It is commonly referred to by fans as 'the Jack'.

The original arena was built in 1932 and became the oldest arena currently used in the CHL following the Windsor Spitfires move to the WFCU Centre in 2008–09. It was previously used by the St. Catharines Teepees, St. Catharines Black Hawks, St. Catharines Fincups and the St. Catharines Saints. Renovated in 1996, it was named after local sportswriter Jack Gatecliff.

==== Niagara Falls Memorial Arena ====
On March 1, 2009, the Niagara IceDogs hosted a home game at Niagara Falls Memorial Arena in nearby Niagara Falls, Ontario. The arena, slated to close in 2010, was the former home to both the Niagara Falls Flyers and the Niagara Falls Thunder. The game was billed as the last OHL game in the arena. At that time, the announced crowd of 3,167 was the largest home crowd in franchise history.

== See also ==
- List of ice hockey teams in Ontario
