= Graham Benton =

British indoor rower (born c. 1973)

Personal information
- Nicknames: Big G Erg Daddy
- Nationality: British
- Born: c. 1973
- Years active: 2002-present
- Height: 200 cm (6 ft 7 in)

Sport
- Country: United Kingdom
- Sport: Indoor rowing
- Weight class: Heavyweight
- Team: MAD Team IRC
- Coached by: Eddie Fletcher

Achievements and titles
- World finals: 6x
- National finals: 15x
- Personal best: 5:42.5 for 2000m

Graham Benton is a British indoor rower. He has won the British Rowing Indoor Championships 15 times and the World Indoor Rowing Championships six. While Benton is primarily an indoor rower, he did row on the water, representing England and competing at several Henley Royal Regattas, including reaching the finals of the Thames Challenge Cup (M8+), The Prince of Wales Challenge Cup (M4x) and the Britannia Challenge Cup (M4+), respectively.

== Athletic career ==
Benton competed in his first indoor rowing competition at age 29. In 2004, Graham Benton became the first non-water rower to win the men's open heavyweight event at the British Indoor Rowing Championships at 5:53.5. He went on to win this title again in 2005 (5:46.9), 2006 (5:46.7), 2007, 2008, 2010 (5:50.8), 2011 (5:46), 2012, 2013 (5:52.4), 2014 (5:52.4), 2015 (5:55:6), 2016 (5:55), 2017 (5:55.7), 2018 and 2023. Benton also won the 30-39 year heavyweight class World Indoor Rowing Championships in 2004 (5:51.40), 2005 (5:53.60), the Open Heavyweight class in 2006 (5:46.40) and in the 40-49 heavyweight class in 2016 (5:48.3), 2017 (5:48), and 2018 (5:54).

In 2012, he set a new British record in the 35-39 heavyweight men's class at the British Indoor Rowing Championships (5:50.1), a title previously held by Sir Steve Redgrave since 1998. In 2014, he held the British outright record at 5:42.5 and in 2017, he had the fastest time in the men's heavyweight open 2000m at the Welsh Indoor Rowing Championships. He was a Henley Royal Regatta finalist in outdoor rowing in 2007, 2008, and 2012. He was given a Lifetime Achievement Award by Concept2 in 2010.

Benton is coached by Eddie Fletcher and was previously part of the ARA World Class Start Program. He currently rows for MAD Team IRC, and has previously rowed for Tideway Scullers School, Taurus and Reading University Boat Club.

== Personal life ==
Benton works as an Account Manager for BMC Software. He was formerly an "elite-level" cricket bowler and is an alumnus of King's School, Chester. He is from Wrexham originally and now lives in Southsea, Hampshire.
