= Gustavo Calderón =

Argentine rower (born 1963)

Personal information
- Nationality: Argentine
- Born: 10 May 1963 (age 63)

Sport
- Sport: Rowing

Gustavo Calderón (born 10 May 1963) is an Argentine rower. He competed in the men's quadruple sculls event at the 1984 Summer Olympics.
