= Ivan Enstad =

Norwegian rower

Personal information
- Nationality: Norwegian
- Born: 20 April 1965 (age 59); Tønsberg, Norway

Sport
- Sport: Rowing

Ivan Enstad (born 20 April 1965) is a Norwegian rower. He competed in the men's quadruple sculls event at the 1984 Summer Olympics.
