= Matthias Siejkowski =

Polish / German rower

Maciej Siejkowski (born 12 December 1967) is a Polish/German rower. He formerly held the world record for 2000 m on an indoor rower, which he first set in a time of 5:39.7 at the World Indoor Rowing Championship in 1997, and later reset with a time of 5:37.0 in Warsaw, Poland on 1 December 2001 in Warsaw, Poland.

Siejkowski is the last man to officially hold the record for 2500 m on an indoor rower with a time of 7:10.7, which he set in 1992 in a race in Germany. In 1996, the World Indoor Rowing Championship changing the official distance of record from 2500 m to 2000 m. This brought the event in line with the on the water distance of record. As a result, records for the 2500 m distance are no longer maintained.

He is now a member of "AZS Politechnika Wrocław" rowing club.
