= Pål Sandli =

Norwegian rower

Personal information
- Nationality: Norwegian
- Born: 1 July 1957 (age 67); Drammen, Norway

Sport
- Sport: Rowing

Pål Sandli (born 1 July 1957) is a Norwegian rower. He competed in the men's quadruple sculls event at the 1984 Summer Olympics.
