= British Rowing Indoor Championships =

Indoor rowing competition in the United Kingdom

The British Rowing Indoor Championships (BRIC) is an indoor rowing event previously organised by The Rowing Company under the title British Indoor Rowing Championships (BIRC). It first began in 1991 with the first event held in Henley-on-Thames attracting 200 competitors. Over the years it outgrew all of its venues and from 2000 was held at the National Indoor Arena in Birmingham. The 2005 championships had over 3,000 entrants and is currently the world 's biggest indoor rowing event and Britain's biggest mass-participation indoor sporting event. Olympic rowing gold medalists Steve Redgrave and Matthew Pinsent have won open titles at the event in the past.

The races are separated men, lightweight men, women, and lightweight women – with these further split into age categories. All competitors over 16 race 2,000 m (the Olympic rowing distance) with shorter time-based events for juniors. There are also team races where teams of four race 3,000 m as a relay.

In 2014, it was announced that the event had been taken over by British Rowing and would be rebranded as the British Rowing Indoor Championships. The first event under the new name was held on 8 February 2015 at the Lee Valley VeloPark.

Graham Benton and Emanuele Romoli are two of the main "non-rower" to win the men's open event at the BIRC, an event dominated until that time by Olympic water rowers such as Matthew Pinsent (who won in 2003), James Cracknell (second in 2003), and Jamie Schroeder (who won in 2002).
