= Mark Emke =

Dutch rower

Personal information
- Nationality: Dutch
- Born: 18 July 1959 (age 65); Amsterdam, Netherlands

Sport
- Sport: Rowing

Mark Emke (born 18 July 1959) is a Dutch rower. He competed in the men's quadruple sculls event at the 1984 Summer Olympics. He later became head coach of the Dutch national team.
