= ALFA (rowing) =

Rowing competition in Estonia

ALFA is the biggest indoor rowing competition in the Baltics raced over 1,000 m on Concept2 indoor rowers. The first competition in Estonia on Concept2 rowing ergometers took place at the end of 1993 in the hall of the Lootos sports association. There were 54 participants in the competition, initiated by the Tallinn Rowing Club. In 1995, the second rowing ergometer competition took place in the sports facilities of Flora with the third event occurring at the same venue in 1996.

The competition was international for the first time in 1997 and the venue was then the Kalev gym at Tõnismägi. In 1998, the competition got the symbolic name ALFA and it took place in Pirita in the TOP tennis hall, and was repeated there in 1999. The 2000 Alfa competition was dedicated to the 125th anniversary of Estonian rowing. The venue, for the years 2000 as well s for 2001, was the Tallinn Sports Hall. In years 2002 and 2003, the competition took place in the Tallinn Kalev Sports Hall and since 2004, the International competitions on Concept2 rowing ergometers have been held again in Tallinn Sports Hall.

Between the years 1993–1997, the organizer of the competitions was the Tallinn Rowing Club and since 1998 the Tallinn Rowing Club in collaboration with the Estonian Rowing Association.

Over the years the number of participants in the Alfa competition has grown from fifty to five hundred and thus is one of the biggest indoor sporting events in Estonia. Nowadays, the Alfa has become a fixed calendar event for the rowers. In addition to rowers, representatives of other sports, amateurs, politicians, firms, school children, the representatives of the defence forces and rescue services etc. participate actively in the competition.

== Winners ==
=== Men ===
Year	Athlete	Time
1993	(Estonia) Jüri Jaanson	2:51,8
1995	(Estonia) Jüri Jaanson	2:48,9
1996	(Estonia) Priit Tasane	2:57,4
1997	(Finland) Klaus Geiger	2:45,0
1998	(Finland) Klaus Geiger	2:44,3
1999	(Estonia) Jüri Jaanson	2:46,6
2000	(Estonia) Jüri Jaanson	2:46,3
2001	(Estonia) Tõnu Endrekson	2:45,1
2002	(Estonia) Tõnu Endrekson	2:44,6
2003	(Belarus) Pavel Shurmei	2:39,8
2004	(Belarus) Pavel Shurmei	2:41,9
2005	(Belarus) Pavel Shurmei	2:40,3
2006	(Belarus) Pavel Shurmei	2:40,2
2007	(Estonia) Tõnu Endrekson	2:45,5
2008	(Latvia) Kristaps Bokums	2:41,2
2009	(Belarus) Pavel Shurmei	2:41,9
2010	(Estonia) Tõnu Endrekson	2:45,1
2011	(Estonia) Tõnu Endrekson	2:43,6
2012	(Estonia) Tõnu Endrekson	2:42,5
2013	(Estonia) Tõnu Endrekson	2:45,3
2014	(Estonia) Tõnu Endrekson	2:43,8
2015	(Estonia) Tõnu Endrekson	2:43,2
2016	(Finland) Joel Naukkarinen	2:42,9
2017	(Belarus) Pavel Shurmei	2:42,5
2018	(Belarus) Pavel Shurmei	2:43,3
2019	(Estonia) Tõnu Endrekson	2:45,9
2020	(Estonia) Tõnu Endrekson	2:45,1
2021	(Estonia) Tõnu Endrekson (Estonia) Leo Muiste	2:46,2
2022	(Estonia) Tõnu Endrekson	2:46,4
2023	(Estonia) Martin Milling	2:48,8

=== Women ===
Year	Athlete	Time
1993	(Estonia) Piret Jamnes	3:21,0
1995	(Estonia) Piret Jamnes	3:17,3
1996	(Estonia) Piret Jamnes	3:16,3
1997	(Lithuania) Birutė Šakickienė	3:17,9
1998	(Lithuania) Birutė Šakickienė	3:18,3
1999	(Estonia) Kalli Meriste	3:21,4
2000	(Estonia) Kalli Meriste	3:18,8
2001	(Estonia) Kalli Meriste	3:20,4
2002	(Latvia) Kristiana Rode-Gulova	3:16,7
2003	(Latvia) Kristiana Rode-Gulova	3:15,6
2004	(Latvia) Kristiana Rode-Gulova	3:17,3
2005	(Latvia) Kristiana Rode-Gulova	3:14,3
2006	(Estonia) Kaisa Pajusalu	3:16,6
2007	(Estonia) Jevgenia Rõndina	3:26,8
2008	(Estonia) Kaisa Pajusalu	3:15,0
2009	(Estonia) Kaisa Pajusalu	3:13,7
2010	(Estonia) Kaisa Pajusalu	3:11,6
2011	(Estonia) Kaisa Pajusalu	3:13,3
2012	(Latvia) Elza Gulbe	3:16,5
2013	(Estonia) Kaisa Pajusalu	3:15,1
2014	(Latvia) Elza Gulbe	3:14,7
2015	(Estonia) Kaisa Pajusalu	3:16,4
2016	(Latvia) Lana Bračka	3:17,8
2017	(Estonia) Liisu Mitt	3:21,5
2018	(Ukraine) Olena Buryak	3:04,9
2019	(Estonia) Liisu Mitt	3:19,6
2020	(Estonia) Grete Alttoa	3:18,2
2021	(Finland) Sonja Peltola	3:18,0
2022	(Estonia) Liisu Mitt	3:20,3
2023	(Finland) Anni Keisanen	3:24,1

Bold marks competition record

== Wins by athlete ==
=== Men ===
Rank	Athlete	Wins	Winning Years
1.	(Estonia) Tõnu Endrekson	13	2001, 2002, 2007, 2010, 2011, 2012, 2013, 2014, 2015, 2019, 2020, 2021, 2022
2.	(Belarus) Pavel Shurmei	7	2003, 2004, 2005, 2006, 2009, 2017, 2018
3.	(Estonia) Jüri Jaanson	4	1993, 1995, 1999, 2000
4.	(Finland) Klaus Geiger	2	1997, 1998
5.	(Estonia) Priit Tasane	1	1996
5.	(Latvia) Kristaps Bokums	1	2008
5.	(Finland) Joel Naukkarinen	1	2016
5.	(Estonia) Leo Muiste	1	2021
5.	(Estonia) Martin Milling	1	2023

=== Women ===
Rank	Athlete	Wins	Winning Years
1.	(Estonia) Kaisa Pajusalu	7	2006, 2008, 2009, 2010, 2011, 2013, 2015
2.	(Latvia) Kristiana Rode-Gulova	4	2002, 2003, 2004, 2005
3.	(Estonia) Piret Jamnes	3	1993, 1995, 1996
3.	(Estonia) Kalli Meriste	3	1999, 2000, 2001
3.	(Estonia) Liisu Mitt	3	2017, 2019, 2022
6.	(Lithuania) Birutė Šakickienė	2	1997, 1998
6.	(Latvia) Elza Gulbe	2	2012, 2014
8.	(Estonia) Jevgenia Rõndina	1	2007
8.	(Latvia) Lana Bračka	1	2016
8.	(Ukraine) Olena Buryak	1	2018
8.	(Estonia) Grete Alttoa	1	2020
8.	(Finland) Sonja Peltola	1	2021
8.	(Finland) Anni Keisanen	1	2023
