= Phil Monckton =

Canadian rower

The Right Honourable The Viscount Galway OLY
Personal information
- Born: 8 April 1952 (age 74) St. Boniface, Manitoba
Medal record
Men's rowing
Representing Canada
Olympic Games
Bronze medal – third place	1984 Los Angeles	Quadruple sculls

John Philip Monckton-Arundell, 13th Viscount Galway (born 8 April 1952 in Saint Boniface, Manitoba) is a Canadian rower, as well an Irish peer. He won a bronze medal in the quadruple sculls event at the 1984 Summer Olympics. He also competed in the coxless four event at the 1976 Summer Olympics, finishing in 5th place. He succeeded his father as Viscount Galway on 30 September 2017.

Peerage of Ireland
Preceded by George Monckton-Arundell	Viscount Galway; 2017–present	Incumbent
