= Military Virtue Medal (Belarus) =

Military Virtue Medal Мэдаль за баявыя заслугі
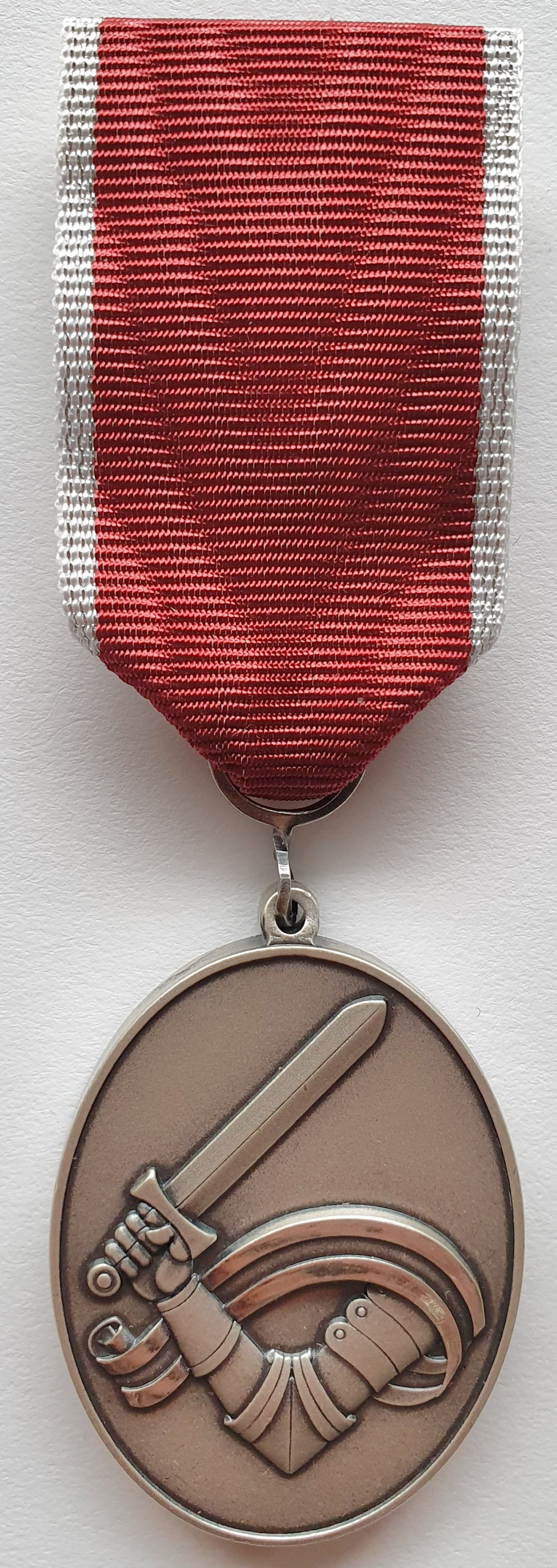
- Abverse of the medal
- Type: Medal
- Awarded for: Personal bravery shown in circumstances involving risk to life and the protection of freedom, independence and the democratic constitutional order of Belarus on the basis of the ideals of the Belarusian Democratic Republic, in particular, while conducting military and official duties, in battle and while conducting special tasks in the national interests of Belarus
- Country: Belarusian Democratic Republic
- Presented by: the Rada of the Belarusian Democratic Republic
- Motto: "Virtute et Gladio"
- Status: Currently awarded
- Established: 2023
- First award: 9 March 2023

Highlights
- Total: 22
- Ribbon bar of the Gold/Yellow Medal (for Officers) Ribbon bar of the Silver/White Medal (for NCOs)

Precedence
- Next (higher): Order of the Iron Knight

The Military Virtue Medal (Belarusian: Мэдаль за баявыя заслугі) is a military decoration awarded by the Rada of the Belarusian Democratic Republic in exile.

== History ==
The medal was established in 2023. Its design is derived from the design of Virtuti Militari, a military award established in 1792 in the Polish-Lithuanian Commonwealth, which is referred to as "the oldest historical Belarusian military award, taking into account the status of Belarus as one of the successor states of the Polish-Lithuanian Commonwealth and of the Grand Duchy of Lithuania".

The phrase Virtute et Gladio (“With courage and sword”) is carved on the reverse of the medal.

== Recipients ==
The first recipients of the medal were 22 soldiers of the Belarusian Kastuś Kalinoŭski Regiment, who demonstrated bravery on the battlefield when fighting on Ukraine's side in the Russo-Ukrainian War, among them former Olympic athlete Pavel Shurmei.
