= Indoor rowing at the 2017 World Games – Men's Open 500 metres =

Men's Open 500 metres at the 2017 World Games
- Venue: Multifunctional Hall
- Location: Jelcz-Laskowice, Poland
- Dates: 27 July
- Competitors: 13 from 13 nations

Medalists
gold medal	Anton Bondarenko	Ukraine
silver medal	Phil Clapp	Great Britain
bronze medal	Pavel Shurmei	Belarus

The men's open 500 metres event in indoor rowing at the 2017 World Games took place on the 27 July 2017 at the Multifunctional Hall in Jelcz-Laskowice.

== Results ==
GR = Games Record

Rank	Athlete	NOC	Time	Notes
1st place, gold medalist(s)	Anton Bonkarenko	Ukraine	1:12.1	GR
2nd place, silver medalist(s)	Phil Clapp	Great Britain	1:12.9	
3rd place, bronze medalist(s)	Pavel Shurmei	Belarus	1:14.1	
4	Vaclav Zitta	Czech Republic	1:14.3	
5	Bartosz Zablocki	Poland	1:14.6	
6	Bendegúz Pétervári-Molnár	Hungary	1:15.8	
7	Ivan Saric	Germany	1:16.4	
8	Jordan Weide	Canada	1:16.6	
9	David Aregger	Switzerland	1:16.9	
10	Antonio Zonta	Italy	1:17.0	
11	Henk Pretorius	South Africa	1:17.5	
12	Georgios Gioupis	Greece	1:18.5	
13	Mario Santer	Austria	1:19.5	
