= Freddie Hamilton =

Canadian ice hockey player (born 1992)

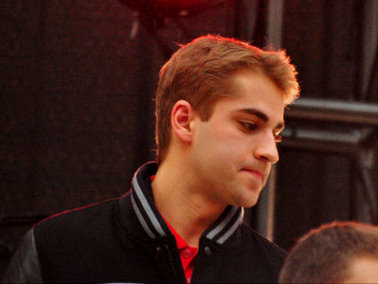
- Hamilton as a member of Team Canada at the 2012 World Junior Ice Hockey Championships
- Born: January 1, 1992 (age 34) Toronto, Ontario, Canada
- Height: 6 ft 1 in (185 cm)
- Weight: 195 lb (88 kg; 13 st 13 lb)
- Position: Centre/Winger
- Shot: Right
- Played for: San Jose Sharks; Colorado Avalanche; Calgary Flames; Arizona Coyotes
- NHL draft: 129th overall, 2010; San Jose Sharks
- Playing career: 2012–2018

Frederick Hamilton (born January 1, 1992) is a Canadian former professional ice hockey forward. He played six seasons in the NHL, split between the San Jose Sharks, Colorado Avalanche, Calgary Flames and Arizona Coyotes, and also played internationally for Canada. Hamilton comes from a talented sports family – his younger brother Dougie plays in the NHL for the New Jersey Devils, and their parents, Doug Hamilton and Lynn Hamilton (née Polson), are former Canadian Olympians.

== Career ==
Hamilton was born and raised in Toronto, Ontario. He grew up playing for the Toronto Marlboros and attended Crestwood Preparatory College until the 2008 Ontario Hockey League (OHL) draft, when he was selected in the first round by the Niagara IceDogs, with their first ever draft pick. Hamilton moved to St. Catharines, Ontario, where he played four seasons for the IceDogs - three of which with his brother. During this time, Hamilton graduated from Governor Simcoe Secondary School with a 99% average (the highest average in the Niagara region), won the Ivan Tennant Memorial Award, and attended Brock University part-time. He also played internationally for Canada at the 2012 World Junior Hockey Championships and at the 2010 Under 18 World Championships, and for Ontario at the 2008 World Under 17 Hockey Championships.

Hamilton was selected by the San Jose Sharks in the fifth round (129th overall) of the 2010 NHL entry draft. He played his first NHL game with the Sharks on October 21, 2013. Hamilton scored his first NHL goal on March 19, 2015, for the Colorado Avalanche. Hamilton played parts of three seasons with his brother for the Calgary Flames. On March 26, 2016, the Hamilton brothers became the first brothers in Flames' history to record a point on the same goal.

== International play ==
Medal record

Representing Canada

Men's Ice Hockey

World Junior Championships
Bronze medal – third place	2012 Canada	

Hamilton represented Team Ontario at the 2008 World Under 17 Hockey Championships in Port Alberni, British Columbia, where they won the gold medal. He then represented Team Canada at the 2010 IIHF World U18 Championships in Minsk, Belarus. Hamilton was named one of the three Top Players of the Tournament for the Canadian Team.

Hamilton, along with his brother, were both named to Team Canada at the 2012 World Junior Ice Hockey Championships in Edmonton and Calgary, Alberta. They were the first brothers to play together for Canada at the World Junior Championships since Mike and Randy Moller in 1982. Team Canada won the bronze medal at the event.

== Career statistics ==
=== Regular season and playoffs ===
			Regular season					Playoffs
Season	Team	League	GP	G	A	Pts	PIM	GP	G	A	Pts	PIM
2008–09	Niagara IceDogs	OHL	65	10	18	28	8	12	2	2	4	4
2009–10	Niagara IceDogs	OHL	64	25	30	55	12	5	1	1	2	6
2010–11	Niagara IceDogs	OHL	68	38	45	83	20	14	4	10	14	4
2011–12	Niagara IceDogs	OHL	60	35	50	85	31	19	7	17	24	9
2012–13	Worcester Sharks	AHL	76	13	13	26	16	—	—	—	—	—
2013–14	Worcester Sharks	AHL	64	22	21	43	6	—	—	—	—	—
2013–14	San Jose Sharks	NHL	11	0	0	0	2	—	—	—	—	—
2014–15	Worcester Sharks	AHL	49	9	21	30	12	—	—	—	—	—
2014–15	San Jose Sharks	NHL	1	0	0	0	0	—	—	—	—	—
2014–15	Lake Erie Monsters	AHL	5	2	2	4	0	—	—	—	—	—
2014–15	Colorado Avalanche	NHL	17	1	0	1	0	—	—	—	—	—
2015–16	Stockton Heat	AHL	62	18	25	43	24	—	—	—	—	—
2015–16	Calgary Flames	NHL	4	1	1	2	0	—	—	—	—	—
2016–17	Calgary Flames	NHL	26	2	0	2	8	1	0	0	0	0
2017–18	Calgary Flames	NHL	8	0	1	1	2	—	—	—	—	—
2017–18	Arizona Coyotes	NHL	8	0	0	0	0	—	—	—	—	—
NHL totals			75	4	2	6	12	1	0	0	0	0

=== International ===
Year	Team	Event	Result	GP	G	A	Pts	PIM
2009	Canada Ontario	U17	1st place, gold medalist(s)	6	2	0	2	0
2010	Canada	WJC18	7th	6	1	5	6	0
2012	Canada	WJC	3rd place, bronze medalist(s)	6	1	6	7	2
Junior totals				18	4	11	15	2

== Awards and honours ==
Award	Year
OHL
Ivan Tennant Memorial Award	2009
