= Curtis Fleming (rower) =

American rower

Personal information
- Nationality: American
- Born: April 25, 1955 (age 71) Morocco

Sport
- Sport: Rowing

Curtis Fleming (born April 25, 1955) is an American rower. He competed in the men's quadruple sculls event at the 1984 Summer Olympics.
