= Oscar Bonini =

Argentine rower (born 1959)

Personal information
- Nationality: Argentine
- Born: 13 July 1959 (age 66)

Sport
- Sport: Rowing

Oscar Bonini (born 13 July 1959) is an Argentine rower. He competed in the men's quadruple sculls event at the 1984 Summer Olympics.
