= Espen Thorsen =

Norwegian rower

Personal information
- Nationality: Norwegian
- Born: 27 March 1962 (age 64) Eidanger, Norway

Sport
- Sport: Rowing

Espen Thorsen (born 27 March 1962) is a Norwegian rower. He competed in the men's quadruple sculls event at the 1984 Summer Olympics.
