= Pascal Dubosquelle =

French rower

Personal information
- Nationality: French
- Born: 2 January 1963 (age 63)

Sport
- Sport: Rowing

Pascal Dubosquelle (born 2 January 1963) is a French rower. He competed in the men's quadruple sculls event at the 1984 Summer Olympics.
