= Stefano Lari =

Italian rower

Personal information
- Nationality: Italian
- Born: 15 April 1961 (age 63)

Sport
- Sport: Rowing

Stefano Lari (born 15 April 1961) is an Italian rower. He competed in the men's quadruple sculls event at the 1984 Summer Olympics.
