= Albert Hedderich =

West German rower

Medal record

Men's rowing

Representing West Germany

Olympic Games
Gold medal – first place	1984 Los Angeles	Quadruple sculls

Albert Hedderich (born 11 December 1957 in Mainz) is a retired German rower who won a gold medal at the 1984 Summer Olympics in Los Angeles.
