= Bruce Beall =

American rower

Personal information
- Born: October 20, 1951 (age 74) Philadelphia, Pennsylvania, U.S.

Sport
- Sport: Rowing

Bruce Beall (born October 20, 1951) is an American rower. He competed in the men's quadruple sculls event at the 1984 Summer Olympics.He coached at Harvard then moved to the west coast and now coaches at Bainbridge Island Rowing in Washington state.
