= Lynn Polson =

Canadian basketball player

Personal information
- Born: April 19, 1962 (age 64) St. Catharines, Ontario, Canada
Medals
FIBA World Championship
Representing Canada
Bronze medal – third place	1986 Soviet Union	Team competition

Lynn Polson Hamilton (born 19 April 1962) is a Canadian former basketball player. She competed for Canada in the women's basketball tournament at the 1984 Summer Olympics in Los Angeles, where the Canadian team finished in fourth place. She then represented Canada at the 1986 FIBA World Championship for Women, where the team finished in third place and won a bronze medal.

== Personal life ==
Polson was born in St. Catharines, Ontario. Polson married rower Doug Hamilton, who also competed at the 1984 Olympics and won a bronze medal. She is the mother of NHL hockey players Dougie and Freddie Hamilton.

== Awards and honors ==
- Top 100 U Sports women's basketball Players of the Century (1920-2020).
- Bishop's Gaiters Wall of Distinction: Inducted in 2004
