= Anthony Lovrich =

Australian rower

Medal record

Men's rowing

Representing Australia

Olympic Games
Silver medal – second place	1984 Los Angeles	Quadruple sculls

Anthony "Tony" Lovrich (born 5 December 1961 in Perth, Western Australia) is an Australian rower. He attended Scotch College (Perth) and raced in the winning crew of the 1978 PSA Head of the River Regatta. He competed in the 1984 Los Angeles Olympic Games, earning a silver medal in the men's Quadruple Scull, before beginning his coaching career. In 1996 he was coach for the Australian Olympic rowing team, and now coaches at Guildford Grammar School in Perth, Western Australia.
