= Krys Barch =

Canadian ice hockey player (born 1980)

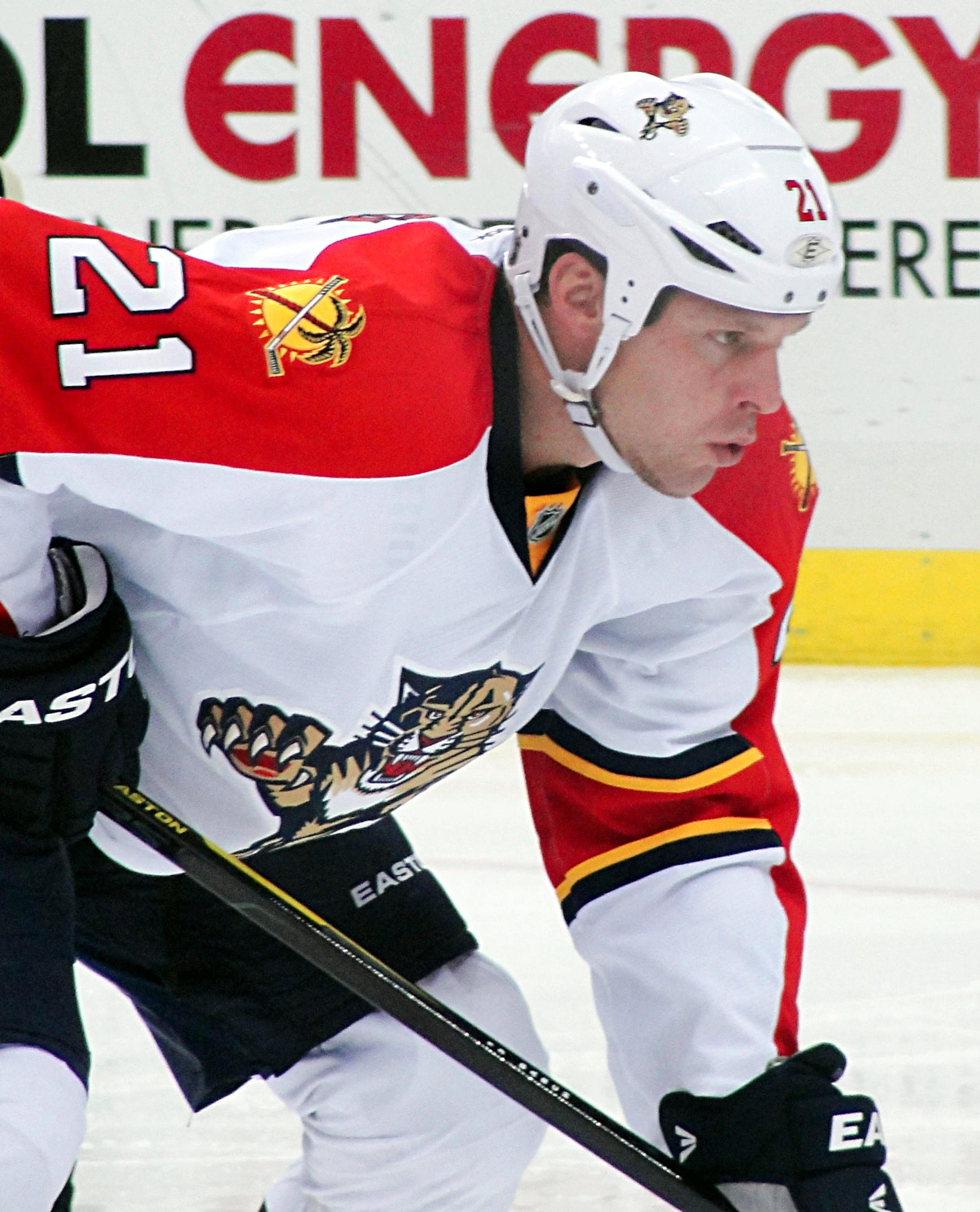
- With the Panthers in 2012.
- Born: March 26, 1980 (age 46) Hamilton, Ontario, Canada
- Height: 6 ft 1 in (185 cm)
- Weight: 237 lb (108 kg; 16 st 13 lb)
- Position: Right wing
- Shot: Left
- Played for: Dallas Stars; Florida Panthers; New Jersey Devils
- NHL draft: 106th overall, 1998; Washington Capitals
- Playing career: 2000–2014

Krystofer Barch (born March 26, 1980) is a Canadian former professional ice hockey forward. He is currently the head coach of the Niagara IceDogs of the Ontario Hockey League.

== Playing career ==
Barch was drafted 106th overall in the 1998 NHL entry draft by the Washington Capitals. Barch played his junior hockey with the London Knights of the Ontario Hockey League. In his three years with London, Barch had 123 points in 187 games while tallying 206 penalty minutes.

Unsigned by the Capitals, Barch signed as a free agent with the Dallas Stars on July 18, 2006. Barch made his NHL debut in the 2006–07 season on January 15, 2007 against the Los Angeles Kings after being called up due to injuries. He remained with the Stars for the remainder of the season, played in 26 of 37 games and scored 3 goals and 2 assists for 5 points. Known as a hard-hitter, Barch had 107 penalty minutes, which included 13 fighting majors.

On January 29, 2009, Barch had eight teeth shattered from a high stick by defenceman Chris Chelios, despite wearing a protective mouthguard, in a game with the Detroit Red Wings.

On December 7, 2011, the Dallas Stars traded Barch and a 6th-round pick in the 2012 draft, to the Florida Panthers in exchange for the minor league forward Jake Hauswirth and a 5th-round pick in 2012.

On December 31, 2011, in a game against the Montreal Canadiens, Barch was given a game misconduct penalty at the end of the first period, following an incident between teammate Erik Gudbranson and P.K. Subban. Hockey Night in Canada on CBC reported that the ejection was due to Barch making a joke that what was incorrectly interpreted to be a racial slur against Subban, who is of Jamaican descent. The incident was witnessed by linesman Darren Gibbs who was standing in front of the players' benches. Barch was suspended one game by the NHL for his comment.

Barch signed a two-year contract with the New Jersey Devils on July 5, 2012. On September 28, 2013, Barch was traded with a seventh round pick to Florida for a sixth round pick and Scott Timmins.

== Personal life ==
Krys and his wife Holly have three children: sons Hayden, born April 14, 2007, Kane, and Kolten.

== Career statistics ==
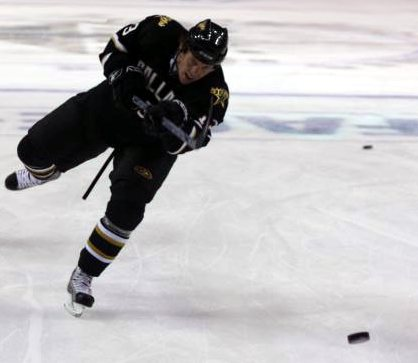
Barch during his time as a Dallas Star

			Regular season					Playoffs
Season	Team	League	GP	G	A	Pts	PIM	GP	G	A	Pts	PIM
1995–96	Georgetown Raiders	OPJHL	41	6	8	14	10	—	—	—	—	—
1996–97	Georgetown Raiders	OPJHL	51	18	26	44	58	—	—	—	—	—
1997–98	London Knights	OHL	65	9	27	36	62	16	4	3	7	16
1998–99	London Knights	OHL	66	18	20	38	66	25	9	17	26	15
1999–00	London Knights	OHL	56	23	26	49	78	—	—	—	—	—
2000–01	Portland Pirates	AHL	76	10	15	25	91	2	0	0	0	0
2001–02	Richmond Renegades	ECHL	25	6	4	10	43	—	—	—	—	—
2001–02	Portland Pirates	AHL	29	3	8	11	28	—	—	—	—	—
2002–03	Portland Pirates	AHL	36	1	7	8	49	—	—	—	—	—
2004–05	Greenville Grrrowl	ECHL	55	11	19	30	154	3	0	0	0	36
2004–05	Norfolk Admirals	AHL	9	1	0	1	37	—	—	—	—	—
2005–06	Greenville Grrrowl	ECHL	14	10	4	14	75	—	—	—	—	—
2005–06	Iowa Stars	AHL	43	7	6	13	129	7	0	1	1	37
2006–07	Iowa Stars	AHL	31	3	5	8	110	—	—	—	—	—
2006–07	Dallas Stars	NHL	26	3	2	5	107	—	—	—	—	—
2007–08	Dallas Stars	NHL	48	1	2	3	105	3	0	0	0	2
2008–09	Dallas Stars	NHL	72	4	5	9	133	—	—	—	—	—
2009–10	Dallas Stars	NHL	63	0	6	6	130	—	—	—	—	—
2010–11	Dallas Stars	NHL	44	2	1	3	80	—	—	—	—	—
2011–12	Dallas Stars	NHL	10	0	0	0	23	—	—	—	—	—
2011–12	Florida Panthers	NHL	41	2	3	5	91	—	—	—	—	—
2012–13	New Jersey Devils	NHL	22	0	0	0	44	—	—	—	—	—
2013–14	Florida Panthers	NHL	55	0	4	4	99	—	—	—	—	—
NHL totals			381	12	23	35	812	3	0	0	0	2
