= Federico Lungwitz =

Argentine rower

Personal information
- Nationality: Argentine
- Born: 8 May 1960 (age 65)

Sport
- Sport: Rowing

Federico Lungwitz (born 8 May 1960) is an Argentine rower. He competed in the men's quadruple sculls event at the 1984 Summer Olympics.
