= Doug Hamilton (rower) =

Canadian Olympic medallist rower

Personal information
- Born: Douglas Turnbull Hamilton; August 19, 1958 (age 67) Toronto, Ontario, Canada
- Height: 186 cm (6 ft 1 in)
- Weight: 83 kg (183 lb)
- Spouse: Lynn Polson
- Relatives: Dougie Hamilton (son); Freddie Hamilton (son)

Sport
- Sport: Rowing
Medal record
Men's rowing
Representing Canada
Olympic Games
Bronze medal – third place	1984 Los Angeles	Quadruple sculls
World Championships
Gold medal – first place	1985 Hazewinkel	Quadruple sculls
Bronze medal – third place	1986 Nottingham	Quadruple sculls
Bronze medal – third place	1987 Copenhagen	Quadruple sculls

Douglas Turnbull Hamilton (born August 19, 1958) is a Canadian Olympic medallist rower.

Hamilton was born in 1958 in Toronto, Ontario, Canada. He won a bronze medal in the men's quadruple sculls event at the 1984 Summer Olympics. He won a gold medal at the 1985 World Rowing Championships in men's quadruple sculls, and bronze medals in the same event at the 1986 World Rowing Championships and 1987 World Rowing Championships He also competed at the 1988 Summer Olympics.

Doug married Lynn Polson (member of Team Canada women's basketball at the 1984 Summer Olympics, placing 4th), and they are parents to NHL hockey players Dougie and Freddie Hamilton.

Hamilton attended high school at University of Toronto Schools, and university at Queen's University and the London School of Economics where he obtained LLB and LLM degrees. He worked as a lawyer in Toronto for 30 years. During his legal career Hamilton volunteered in many capacities in Canadian amateur sport, including as VP of High-Performance of Rowing Canada Aviron, Chair of the Canadian Sport Centre Ontario, and Board Member of the Toronto 2015 Pan/Parapan Am Games. Hamilton now lives in St. Catharines, Ontario and is the Chair of the Niagara 2022 Canada Summer Games.
