= Pavel Shurmei =

Belarusian rower (born 1976)

Personal information
- Full name: Pavel Antonovich Shurmei
- Born: 1 September 1976 (age 49) Lida, Grodno Region, Byelorussian SSR, Soviet Union
- Height: 6 ft 6.5 in (199 cm)
- Weight: 251 lb (114 kg)

Sport
- Country: Belarus
- Sport: Rowing; Indoor rowing
- Club: Sub 7 Indoor Rowing Club
- Team: Belarus Rowing Team
Medal record
Representing Belarus
Men's indoor rowing
World Games
Bronze medal – third place	2017 Wrocław	500 m

Pavel Antonavich Shurmei (Belarusian: Павел Антонавіч Шурмей, born 1 September 1976) is a Belarusian rower who competed at two Olympic Games and holds multiple world records on the Concept2 indoor rowing machine. He is one of the Belarusian volunteers of the Kastuś Kalinoŭski Battalion. From April 2024 to November 2025, he was the commander of the Kastuś Kalinoŭski Regiment. He lives in the United States.

== Rowing career ==
Shurmei's primary discipline is sculling.

=== Olympic Games ===
Shurmei competed at both the 2004 and 2008 Olympic Games with the Belarusian team.

At the 2004 Games, Shurmei competed in the men's quadruple sculls. His team came third in their heat, qualifying for the semi-final, in which they finished third. This qualified them for the A final of the event, where they finished last of the six teams.

At the 2008 Games, Shurmei competed again in the men's quadruple sculls. His team finished third in their heat, qualifying for the semi-final, in which they finished last. This meant that they progressed to the B final, where they finished 5th for a position of 11th overall.

== Indoor rowing career ==
Shurmei has won the CRASH-B Sprints in the open category twice, in 2004 and 2005. He has also come 2nd twice, in 2013 and 2017.

Shurmei has won the international ALFA indoor rowing competition seven times and hold the competition record since 2003 (2:39.8 over 1000m).

He currently holds the world records in the 40–49 heavyweight category for both the 1000m and 2000m distances.

== World rankings ==
Below are the season-end world rankings for Shurmei in various indoor rowing events where he finished in the top 50.

=== 500m ===
Season	Rank	Time	Notes
2017	3	1:13.7	

=== 1000m ===
Season	Rank	Time	Notes
2009	1	2:41.9	

=== 2000m ===
Season	Rank	Time	Notes
2017	6	5:47.8	
2013	11	5:53.5	
2011	5	5:51.2	
2005	1	5:43.2	
2004	1	5:39.6	

== Personal bests ==
Event	Result	ompetition	Date
500 metres	1:13.7	2017 World Games	27 July 2017
1000 metres	2:39.8	2003 ALFA	1 February 2003
2000 metres	5:39.6	2004 CRASH-B Sprints	22 February 2004

== Military career ==
He is serving in the Belarusian Kastuś Kalinoŭski Regiment on the Ukrainian side in the Russian invasion of Ukraine. Shurmei assumed command of the regiment in April 2024.

Shurmei was wounded in action and is among the first recipients of the Military Virtue Medal from the Rada of the Belarusian Democratic Republic.

In March 2023, it became known that a criminal case was opened in Belarus against Pavel Shurmei in absentia. In 2026, he was sentenced in absentia to 25 years in prison and a large fine.
