= Emanuele Romoli =

Italian indoor rower and coach (born 1957)

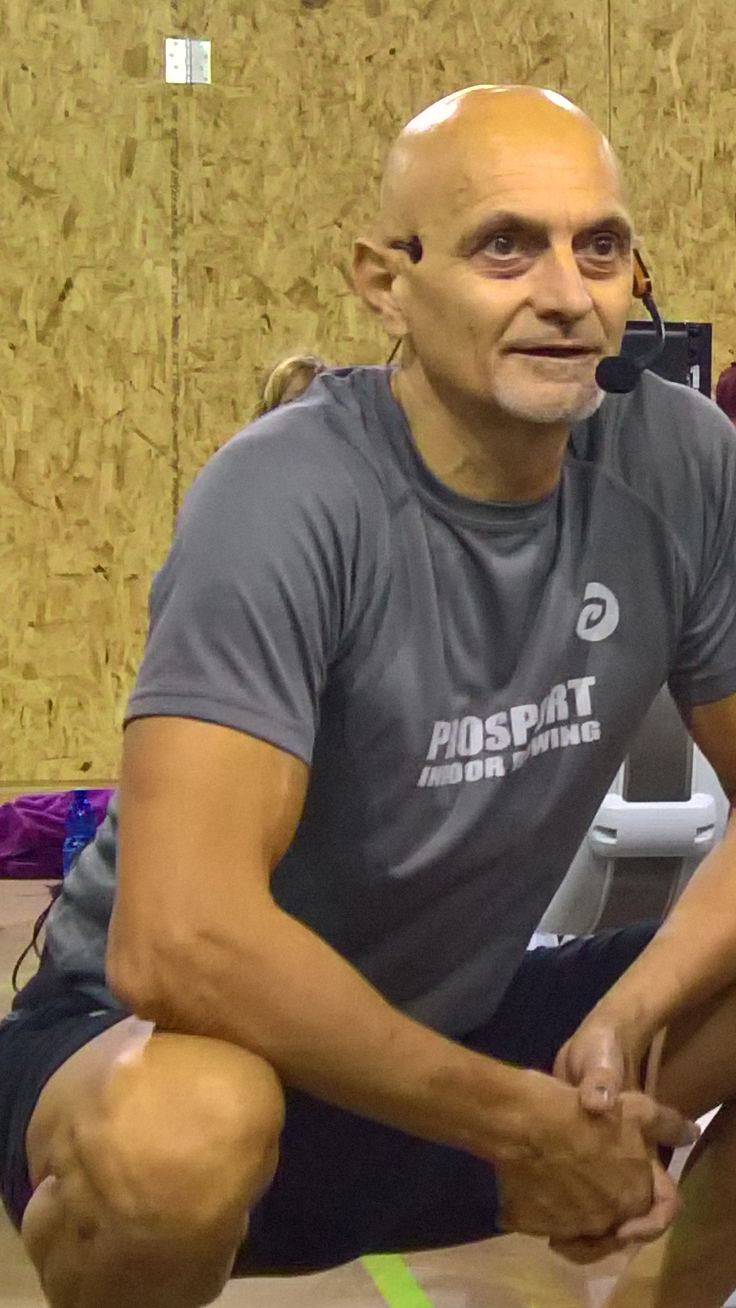
- Emanuele Romoli in 2018

Personal information
- Nationality: Italian
- Born: 20 March 1957 (age 69) Desio, Italy
- Occupation: Indoor rowing coach

Sport
- Country: Italy
- Sport: Indoor rowing
- Team: Prosport, Trento
Medal record
Men's indoor rowing
World Championships
| Gold medal – first place | 2024 | LM 65-69 |
| Gold medal – first place | 2023 | LM 65-69 |
| Silver medal – second place | 2021 | LM 60 |
European Championships
| Gold medal – first place | 2024 | Individual |
| Gold medal – first place | 2023 | Individual |
| Silver medal – second place | 2020 | Individual |
| Bronze medal – third place | 2020 | Relay 4x500 |
| Gold medal – first place | 2014 | Individual |
| Gold medal – first place | 2013 | Individual |
| Gold medal – first place | 2012 | Individual |
| Gold medal – first place | 2012 | Relay 4x500 |
| Silver medal – second place | 2010 | Individual |
| Silver medal – second place | 2009 | Individual |
| Gold medal – first place | 2007 | Individual |
| Gold medal – first place | 2007 | Relay 4x500 |
CRASH-B Sprints
| Gold medal – first place | 2021 | LM 60 |
| Gold medal – first place | 2018 | LM 60 |
| Silver medal – second place | 2013 | LM 55 |
| Silver medal – second place | 2008 | LM 50 |

Emanuele Romoli (born 20 March 1957 in Desio, Italy) is an Italian indoor rower and coach.

== Rowing career ==
The first success in the practice of indoor rowing comes in 2001 with the victory of the gold medal at the Italian championships. In 2005 he returned to winning the national championship, which he will repeat uninterruptedly until 2012. In 2007 he also triumphs abroad with victories in the British Indoor Rowing Championships, in the French one and, above all, in the European championship, in which he conquered both the individual title and the relay title. In 2008 he took part in the CRASH-B Sprints winning the silver medal in the Lightweights Veteran Man 50–54 category.

In the following decade, national champion was reconfirmed (both at individual and team level) and continental, where, besides the European alloro, he also completed his palmares with four affirmations in the German Ergoregatta. Confirmed vice-world champion in 2013, just one tenth of a second from the time established by the Canadian Steve Roedde in the Lightweights Veteran Man 55–59 category. However, the world gold medal came in 2018 in the Lightweights Veteran Man 60–64 category, to which he followed a few days after the 12th individual Italian title.

In the 2018 season he achieved further victories at the BRIC, the 4th win at the Ergoregatta and further individual Italian titles on both distances, while between 2019 and 2020 adds a silver medal to the European championships in Prague, in addition to individual and team victories in the British and Italian championship.

During 2021, the year in which international competitions were held remotely due to the COVID-19 pandemic, the season opens with the third place at the MAIF Open France, the second place at CIRC, the Canadian Indoor rowing Championship and the victory at the new format of the Italian Rowing Championship, organized by the Italian Rowing Federation. The most important victories of the year, however, are the second affirmation at the C.R.A.S.H.-B. Sprints in the lightweight category and above all the silver medal in the first edition of the new world championships.

In 2023, competing in the category "Lightweight Men 65-69", he won the gold medal both in the World and European Championship. This result was confirmed in 2024, when the two competitions were held together during the event in Prague.

== Achievements ==
=== World Rowing Indoor Championships ===
- 2024 – Gold - Lightweight Men 65-69
- 2023 – Gold - Lightweight Men 65-69
- 2021 – Silver - Lightweight Men 60

=== European Indoor Rowing Championships ===
- Gold – Individual: 2007, 2012, 2013, 2014, 2023, 2024
- Silver – Individual: 2009, 2010, 2020
- Gold – Relay 4x500: 2007, 2012
- Bronze – Relay 4x500: 2020

=== CRASH-B Sprints ===
- 2021 – Gold - Lightweight Men 60
- 2018 – Gold - Lightweight Men 60
- 2013 – Silver - Lightweight Men 55
- 2008 – Silver - Lightweight Men 50

=== National competitions ===
- C2 Open Championship:
  - Individual - 2000m: 2001, 2005, 2006, 2007, 2008, 2009, 2010, 2011, 2012, 2017, 2018, 2019, 2020
  - Individual - 500m: 2017, 2018, 2019, 2020
  - Relay 4x500: 2008, 2012, 2014, 2018, 2020
- Italian Rowing Championship:
  - Individual: 2021, 2022, 2023
- British Indoor Rowing Championships:
  - Individual - 2000m: 2007, 2012, 2015, 2017, 2019
  - Individual - 500m: 2016, 2017, 2018, 2019
- Ergoregatta: 2014, 2016, 2017, 2019
- Aviron-Indoor: 2007

=== Other competitions ===
- National circuit Row Race: 2002, 2003, 2004
- World Ergo Head: 2008

== Personal ==
Native of Desio in Lombardy, he grew up professionally in Trentino where he currently carries out his activity as an instructor in a.s.d. Prosport of Trento. He is recognized as an indoor rowing master trainer by Concept 2.

For the results obtained in the season 2007–2008, on 24 June 2008 he was awarded the San Vigilio d'oro per lo sport, an award given by the municipality of Trento for athletes who were able to stand out with their results sports in the national and international field.

On 4 April 4, 2019 he received from the president of the municipal council of Trento the Sporting Merit of the Municipality of Trento for the national and international competitive successes and for the activity of sport promotion in Trento.
