= Marc Boudoux =

French rower

Personal information
- Nationality: French
- Born: 3 July 1959 (age 65)

Sport
- Sport: Rowing

Marc Boudoux (born 3 July 1959) is a French rower. He competed at the 1980 Summer Olympics and the 1984 Summer Olympics.
