= Michael Dürsch =

German rower (born 1957)

Medal record

Men's rowing

Representing West Germany

Olympic Games
Gold medal – first place	1984 Los Angeles	Quadruple sculls

Michael Dürsch (born 28 March 1957 in Herrsching, Bayern) is a retired German rower who won a gold medal at the 1984 Summer Olympics in Los Angeles.
