= Gary Gullock =

Australian rower

Medal record

Men's rowing

Representing Australia

Olympic Games
Silver medal – second place	1984 Los Angeles	Quadruple sculls

World Rowing Championships
Bronze medal – third place	1990 Tasmania	M2x

Gary Gullock (born 1 March 1958) is an Australian Olympic medal winning rower.

In 2010 Gullock was inducted as a member of the Rowing Victoria Hall of Fame.
