= Mike Hughes (rower) =

Canadian rower (born 1959)

Personal information
- Born: August 7, 1959 (age 66) St. Catharines, Ontario, Canada
Medal record
Men's Rowing
Representing Canada
Olympic Games
Bronze medal – third place	1984 Los Angeles	Quadruple Sculls

Michael Hughes (born August 7, 1959) is a Canadian rower. He graduated from Pennsylvania State University.

He won a bronze medal in the Quadruple Sculls event at the 1984 Summer Olympics. Hughes retired from active competition in 1985.
