= Goodall Cup Finals =

Championship of Australian hockey

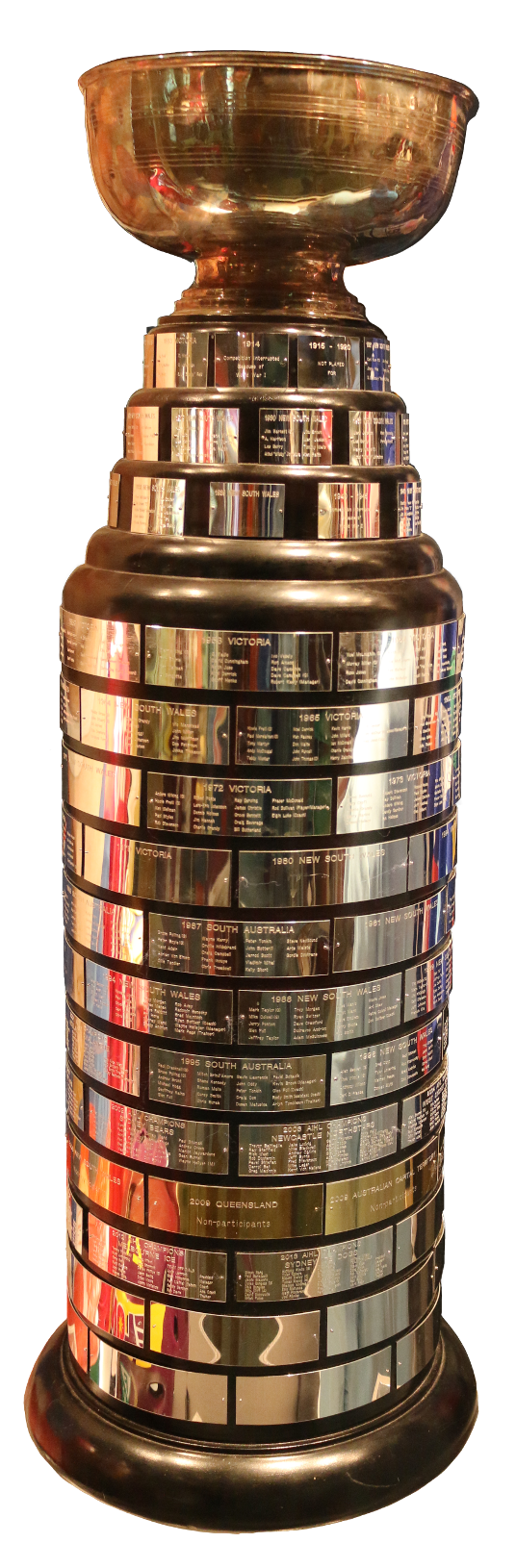
- The Goodall Cup is awarded to the winner of the championship series.
- First awarded: 1911 but possibly earlier
- Most recent: 2015

In ice hockey, the Goodall Cup Final is the championship game to determine the winner of the Goodall Cup, the oldest ice hockey trophy outside of North America and the oldest inside Australia.

The Goodall Cup was originally an annual inter-state challenge in a best-of-three format between state representative teams; the champions would retain the cup if they won the following years championship tournament or if it resulted in a tie.

== History ==
The first inter-state ice hockey championship was held between a state representative team from Victoria and from New South Wales. This tournament was a best-of-3 format and saw Victoria win the series 2 games to 1. New South Wales was represented by a newly formed team in 1909 and traveled to Melbourne on 29 August 1909 which marked the first national interstate competition for senior men's hockey in Australia. The Victoria state team won the inaugural tournament to become the first Interstate Champions, with Robert Jackson as the captain.

The first game of the series had a final score of 2–1 with New South Wales defeating Victoria. Friday 3 September 1909 the Victorian team defeated the New South Wales team 1–0, giving Victorian goaltender Charles Watt the first recorded shutout in the history of the interstate tournaments. In the third game of the series both teams had won a game each. Victoria defeated New South Wales 6-1 and became the first team to win the interstate championship in Australia.

== See also ==
- Goodall Cup
- Australian Ice Hockey League
- Ice Hockey Australia
