= Luis Miguel Oliver =

Spanish rower (born 1959)

Personal information
- Nationality: Spanish
- Born: 4 August 1959 (age 65)

Sport
- Sport: Rowing

Luis Miguel Oliver (born 4 August 1959) is a Spanish rower. He competed at the 1980 Summer Olympics and the 1984 Summer Olympics.
