= Pascal Body =

French rower

Personal information
- Nationality: French
- Born: 30 August 1961 (age 63)

Sport
- Sport: Rowing

Pascal Body (born 30 August 1961) is a French rower. He competed at the 1984 Summer Olympics and the 1988 Summer Olympics.
