= Renato Gaeta =

Italian rower

Personal information
- Nationality: Italian
- Born: 24 April 1959 (age 65)

Sport
- Sport: Rowing

Renato Gaeta (born 24 April 1959) is an Italian rower. He competed at the 1984 Summer Olympics and the 1988 Summer Olympics.
