= Maria Stevens =

English woman (died after 1707)

Maria Stevens (died after 1707) was an English woman who was trialed for witchcraft.

She was accused of having bewitched an acquaintance, Dorothy Reeves. The trial was held at Taunton Castle. Stevens was acquitted and released after judge and jury failed to believe the evidence given against her.

Her trial belonged to the last witch trials in England, where witch trials gradually became fewer after the restoration of 1660, and the last in the south-west. It was followed in 1712 by the trial against Jane Wenham.
