= Omar Ferrari =

Argentine rower

Personal information
- Nationality: Argentine
- Born: 17 October 1959 (age 65)

Sport
- Sport: Rowing

Omar Ferrari (born 17 October 1959) is an Argentine rower. He competed in the men's quadruple sculls event at the 1984 Summer Olympics.
