= Serge Fornara =

French rower

Personal information
- Nationality: French
- Born: 8 January 1955 (age 70)

Sport
- Sport: Rowing

Serge Fornara (born 8 January 1955) is a French rower. He competed at the 1976 Summer Olympics, 1980 Summer Olympics and the 1984 Summer Olympics.
