= Paul Reedy =

Australian rower (born 1961)

Personal information
- Born: 21 January 1961 (age 65)
- Years active: 1980–1997

Sport
- Sport: Rowing
- Club: Melbourne University Boat Club

Achievements and titles
- Olympic finals: 1984 Los Angeles; 1988 Seoul
Medal record
Men's rowing
Representing Australia
Olympic Games
Silver medal – second place	1984 Los Angeles	Quad scull
World Rowing Championships
Bronze medal – third place	1990 Tasmania	Double scull
Commonwealth Games
Silver medal – second place	1986 Edinburgh	Double scull

Paul Reedy (born 21 January 1961 in Robinvale, Victoria) is an Australian former rower. He is a dual Olympian, an Olympic and Commonwealth Games silver medalist who competed over a seventeen-year period at the elite level. He was a fourteen-time Australian national champion across both sculling and sweep-oared boats and then coached six Australian crews to national championship titles. He later coached at the London Rowing Club and was appointed as British national Head Coach from 2009. He took Great Britain's lightweight women's sculling crews to Olympic and World Championship gold medals in 2012 and 2016.

== Club and state rowing ==
Reedy's senior rowing was done from the Melbourne University Boat Club excepting 1986 when he rowed from and raced for the Balmain Rowing Club in Sydney.

He was first selected to state representation in the 1980 Victorian youth eight who won the Noel F Wilkinson Trophy at the Interstate Regatta within the Australian Rowing Championships. In 1981 he was the emergency reserve for the Victorian senior men's eight.

In 1984, from 1987 to 1989 and in 1996 he was selected as the Victorian single sculls representative to contest the President's Cup in the Interstate Regatta. He won that title in 1984 and placed second in 1987 and 1988. In 1986 while living in Sydney and rowing under his national coach Rusty Robertson he raced the President's Cup as the New South Wales state representative. In 1989 he was selected in Victoria's senior eight to contest the King's Cup, although that year's race was cancelled due to a cyclone. He raced in Victorian King's Cup eights in 1993 and 1997 and saw victory in 1993.

In Melbourne University colours he contested and won a number of national championship events at the Australian Rowing Championships. He won the national quad sculls title in 1982. He placed second in the double scull and the quad in 1983. He contested all three men's sculling events in 1984, 1985, 1986, 1987, 1989 and 1990. He won in the quad in 1984, 1985, 1987, 1988, 1989 and 1990. He also won in the double-scull in 1987, 1988, 1990 and 1991. In 1986 he was living in Sydney and represented the Balmain Rowing Club in the three events he raced that year.

== International representative rowing ==
Reedy made his Australian representative debut in the 1983 Trans Tasman series. In a double scull with Tony Lorich he won all of the four matches races in the series against New Zealand.

In 1984 Reedy made his senior representative debut in the senior men's quad scull selected to compete at the 1984 Los Angeles Olympics and coached by Rusty Robertson. The Australians won their heat by a length and led at the first three marks in the final till the experienced West Germans, the current World Champions, slipped under their guard in an outside lane to win by 0.43 seconds. Rowing in the bow seat Reedy won Olympic silver.

Lovrich and Reedy stayed together in 1985 in the quad and still coached by Robertson, were joined by John Bentley and Richard Powell. Reedy stroked that crew at the 1985 World Rowing Championships to an overall eighth-place finish. The following year at the 1986 Commonwealth Games Reedy competed in Australia's double scull with Brenton Terrell and won the silver medal. At the 1987 World Rowing Championships Reedy was again paired with Richard Powell in the double scull. They were eliminated in the repechage.

At the 1988 Seoul Olympics Reedy was back in the Australian quad with Powell, Terrell and the veteran Peter Antonie making his first Olympic appearance. They finished in fifth place. For the next two year at World Championships Reedy raced the double scull with Peter Antonie. They finished fourth at Bled 1989 and then at Lake Barrington 1990 they won the bronze medal.

Reedy made two more appearances for Australia at World Championships. At Vienna 1991 he rowed in the quad scull which finished twelfth. After a four-year break he raced with Rhett Ayliffe at Tampere 1995 to an eleventh placing.

== Coaching career ==
Reedy had enormous success as a coach of Victorian state representative crews at the annual Interstate Regatta. He coached Jason Day who won the single sculls title in 1994, the victorious women's youth eight of 1997, the winning women's coxless four of 1998 and the victorious women's senior eight of 1999. In 2000 he coached both Victorian men's and women's senior eights to their respective victories in the King's and Queen's Cups.

At the Australian representative level he coached Jason Day and Peter Antonie in their double sculls campaign for the 1993 World Rowing Championships and Sam Golding and Tim Hawkins in the lightweight double scull to the 1994 World Championships. In 1999 he coached the Australian men’s quad scull to World Rowing U23 Championships in Hamburg.

In 2001 Reedy moved to the UK to coach at the London Rowing Club and by 2002 he was Head Coach there. In 2009 he was appointed as Head Coach of Great Britain's national rowing team. He coach Sophie Hosking and Katherine Copeland to gold in a lightweight double scull at the London 2012 Olympics; the 2016 World Champion British women's lightweight quad scull; and world championship medalists Hester Goodsell and Charlotte Taylor.
