= Jesús González (rower, born 1959) =

Spanish rower

Personal information
- Nationality: Spanish
- Born: 6 January 1959
- Died: 3 September 2017 (aged 58)

Sport
- Sport: Rowing

Jesús González (6 January 1959 – 3 September 2017) was a Spanish rower. He competed at the 1980 Summer Olympics and the 1984 Summer Olympics.
