= Dieter Wiedenmann =

West German rower

Medal record

Men's rowing

Representing West Germany

Olympic Games
Gold medal – first place	1984 Los Angeles	Quadruple sculls

Dieter Benedikt Wiedenmann (23 April 1957 in Ulm – 11 November 1994 in Langensteinbach) was a German rower who won a gold medal at the 1984 Summer Olympics in Los Angeles.
