= Antonio Dell'Aquila =

Italian rower

Personal information
- Nationality: Italian
- Born: 20 December 1957 (age 67); Ottaviano, Italy

Sport
- Sport: Rowing

Antonio Dell'Aquila (born 20 December 1957) is an Italian rower. He competed at the 1980 Summer Olympics and the 1984 Summer Olympics.
