= Ridgely Johnson =

American rower

Personal information
- Nationality: American
- Born: April 24, 1958 (age 68) New York, New York, United States

Sport
- Sport: Rowing

Ridgely Johnson (born April 24, 1958) is an American rower. He competed in the men's quadruple sculls event at the 1984 Summer Olympics.
