= Julio Oliver =

Spanish rower

Personal information
- Nationality: Spanish
- Born: 13 December 1960 (age 64)

Sport
- Sport: Rowing

Julio Oliver (born 13 December 1960) is a Spanish rower. He competed at the 1980 Summer Olympics and the 1984 Summer Olympics.
