= Greg Montesi =

American rower (born 1959)

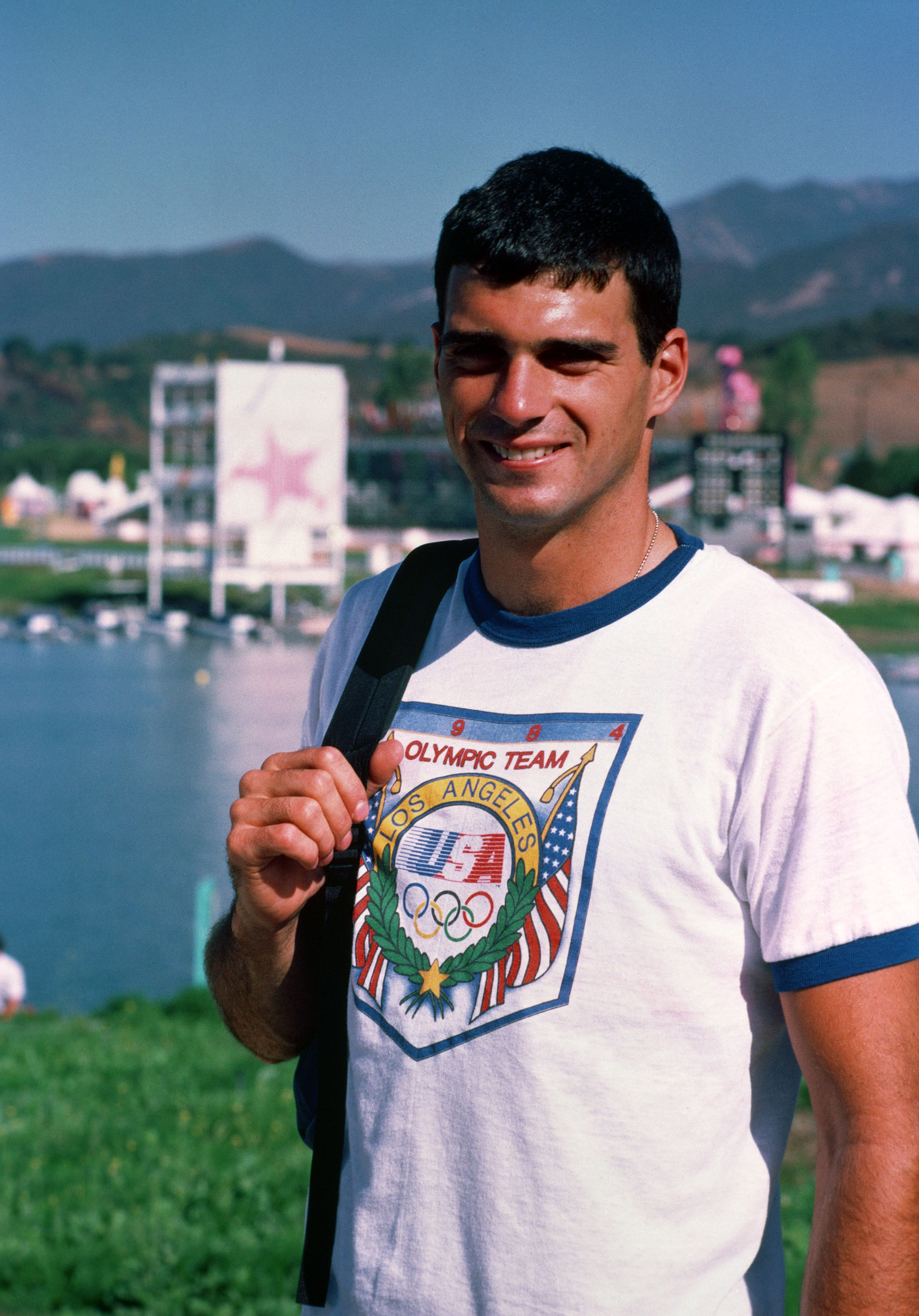
- Montesi in 1984

Personal information
- Nationality: American
- Born: April 15, 1959 (age 67)

Sport
- Sport: Rowing

Greg Montesi (born April 15, 1959) is an American rower. While attending the Salisbury School in Salisbury, CT, he won the US Junior single sculls champion in 1977. Montesi competed at the 1984 Summer Olympics and the 1988 Summer Olympics.
