= Jevgenia Rõndina =

Estonian rower

Jevgenia Rõndina (born 20 May 1989) is an Estonian rower.

She was born in Narva. She has studied at University of Tartu's Institute of Physical Education.

She started her rowing exercising under the guidance of Valeri Osmokesku. She has won medals at Junior World Rowing Championships. She is three-times Estonian champion.

In 2006 and 2007 she was named as Best Junior Rower of Estonian Rowing Association.
