= Rowing at the 1984 Summer Olympics – Women's coxed four =

Women's coxed four at the Games of the XXIII Olympiad
- Date: 30 July – 4 August 1984
- Competitors: 45 from 9 nations

Medalists
1st place, gold medalist(s)		Florica Lavric; Maria Fricioiu; Chira Apostol; Olga Bularda; Viorica Ioja	Romania
2nd place, silver medalist(s)		Marilyn Brain; Angela Schneider; Barbara Armbrust; Jane Tregunno; Lesley Thompson	Canada
3rd place, bronze medalist(s)		Robyn Grey-Gardner; Karen Brancourt; Susan Chapman; Margot Foster; Susan Lee	Australia

The women's coxed four competition at the 1984 Summer Olympics took place at took place at Lake Casitas, California, United States of America.

== Competition format ==
The competition consisted of two main rounds (heats and finals) as well as a repechage. The 9 boats were divided into two heats for the first round, with 5 boats in one heat and 4 in the other. The winner of each heat advanced directly to the "A" final (1st through 6th place). The remaining 7 boats were placed in the repechage. The repechage featured two heats, with 3 boats in one heat and 4 in the other. The top two boats in each of the repechage heats went to the "A" final. The remaining 3 boats (3rd and 4th placers in the repechage heats) competed in the "B" final for 7th through 9th place.

All races were over a 1000 metre course.

== Results ==
=== Heats ===
The heats were held on July 30, during calm winds on a warm day (27 °C). The winner of each advanced to the A final, with all others going to the repechage. No boats were eliminated in this round.

==== Heat 1 ====
There was little drama to this race. The Romanian boat rowed out to an early lead and was never challenged. The Dutch and Americans were close for second place at the halfway mark, but the Dutch pulled away over the second half. The Chinese boat (making the country's Olympic rowing debut) and the South Korean boat (making the country's second Olympic rowing appearance—South Korea had sent a men's eight in 1964) were well behind the other teams.

Rank	Rowers	Coxswain	Nation	Time	Notes
1	Chira Apostol; Olga Bularda; Maria Fricioiu; Florica Lavric	Viorica Ioja	Romania	3:21.61	QA
2	Marieke van Drogenbroek; Catalien Neelissen; Anne-Marie Quist; Wiljon Vaandrager	Marty Laurijsen	Netherlands	3:24.98	R
3	Jan Harville; Liz Miles; Abby Peck; Patricia Spratlen	Valerie McClain-Ward	United States	3:28.02	R
4	Chen Changfeng; Huang Meixia; Shi Meiping; Yang Xiao	Zhang Liming	China	3:37.70	R
5	Kim Jeong-nam; Kim Myeong-jae; Kim Yeong-hui; Park Hye-suk	An Hae-eun	South Korea	3:55.03	R

==== Heat 2 ====
While there was less distance between first and last in the second heat than the first, it was again not a race where any two boats were particularly close to each other. The Canadians won by over 3 seconds, the Australians took second by more than 4 seconds, and the West Germans finished third by over 1.5 seconds.

Rank	Rowers	Coxswain	Nation	Time	Notes
1	Barbara Armbrust; Marilyn Brain; Angela Schneider; Jane Tregunno	Lesley Thompson	Canada	3:23.45	QA
2	Karen Brancourt; Susan Chapman; Margot Foster; Robyn Grey-Gardner	Susan Lee	Australia	3:36.54	R
3	Angelika Beblo; Sabine Hinkelmann; Heike Neu; Kerstin Rehders	Heidrun Barth	West Germany	3:30.69	R
4	Katie Ball; Jean Genchi; Teresa Millar; Joanna Toch	Kathy Talbot	Great Britain	3:32.27	R

=== Repechage ===
The repechage was held on August 1, during calm winds on a cooler day than the heats (16 °C vs. 27 °C). The top two boats in each of the two repechage heats advanced to the A final, with all others going to the B final, out of contention for medals.

==== Repechage heat 1 ====
The Dutch team led early and finished with an easy win, more than 5 seconds ahead. In the competition for the second spot in the "A" final, China could not keep up with West Germany, falling behind by 2 seconds at the halfway mark and unable to close that gap over the last 500 metres.

Rank	Rowers	Coxswain	Nation	Time	Notes
1	Marieke van Drogenbroek; Catalien Neelissen; Anne-Marie Quist; Wiljon Vaandrager	Marty Laurijsen	Netherlands	3:24.62	QA
2	Angelika Beblo; Sabine Hinkelmann; Heike Neu; Kerstin Rehders	Heidrun Barth	West Germany	3:29.73	QA
3	Chen Changfeng; Huang Meixia; Shi Meiping; Yang Xiao	Zhang Liming	China	3:32.07	QB

==== Repechage heat 2 ====
The second repechage heat was another race with little competitiveness. The Americans won by over 3 seconds, with more than 6 seconds separating second and third places.

Rank	Rowers	Coxswain	Nation	Time	Notes
1	Jan Harville; Liz Miles; Abby Peck; Patricia Spratlen	Valerie McClain-Ward	United States	3:23.70	QA
2	Karen Brancourt; Susan Chapman; Margot Foster; Robyn Grey-Gardner	Susan Lee	Australia	3:26.84	QA
3	Katie Ball; Jean Genchi; Teresa Millar; Joanna Toch	Kathy Talbot	Great Britain	3:33.42	QB
4	Kim Jeong-nam; Kim Myeong-jae; Kim Yeong-hui; Park Hye-suk	An Hae-eun	South Korea	3:49.70	QB

=== Finals ===
==== Final B ====
The "B" final for 7th through 9th places was held on August 3. There was an east-northeast wind at 1.2 m/s on a fairly warm day (23 °C). Great Britain took an early lead of 2.5 seconds through the halfway mark. China, however, pushed them hard in the second half, narrowing the distance to only a half-second win by the British boat. South Korea, as was the case throughout the event, was outclassed by the other teams.

Rank	Rowers	Coxswain	Nation	Time
7	Katie Ball; Jean Genchi; Teresa Millar; Joanna Toch	Kathy Talbot	Great Britain	3:33.72
8	Chen Changfeng; Huang Meixia; Shi Meiping; Yang Xiao	Zhang Liming	China	3:34.22
9	Kim Jeong-nam; Kim Myeong-jae; Kim Yeong-hui; Park Hye-suk	An Hae-eun	South Korea	3:51.48

==== Final A ====
The main final was held on August 4. The wind was calm again, and the day was cool (18 °C). The heat winners, Romania and Canada, had little difficulty taking gold and silver, respectively; Canada looked to challenge Romania for gold early but could not keep pace. The two teams that had advanced from the second repechage heat battled for the bronze medal, with the Australians winning a tight race with a "last minute push." The Dutch team had actually been in third at the halfway mark before falling back to fifth. The West Germany boat kept close to the others early but eventually finished 5 seconds out of fifth place.

Rank	Rowers	Coxswain	Nation	Time
1st place, gold medalist(s)	Chira Apostol; Olga Bularda; Maria Fricioiu; Florica Lavric	Viorica Ioja	Romania	3:19.30
2nd place, silver medalist(s)	Barbara Armbrust; Marilyn Brain; Angela Schneider; Jane Tregunno	Lesley Thompson	Canada	3:21.55
3rd place, bronze medalist(s)	Karen Brancourt; Susan Chapman; Margot Foster; Robyn Grey-Gardner	Susan Lee	Australia	3:23.29
4	Jan Harville; Liz Miles; Abby Peck; Patricia Spratlen	Valerie McClain-Ward	United States	3:23.58
5	Marieke van Drogenbroek; Catalien Neelissen; Anne-Marie Quist; Wiljon Vaandrager	Marty Laurijsen	Netherlands	3:23.97
6	Angelika Beblo; Sabine Hinkelmann; Heike Neu; Kerstin Rehders	Heidrun Barth	West Germany	3:29.03

== Final classification ==
Rank	Rowers	Country
1st place, gold medalist(s)	Florica Lavric; Maria Fricioiu; Chira Apostol; Olga Bularda; Viorica Ioja	Romania
2nd place, silver medalist(s)	Marilyn Brain; Angela Schneider; Barbara Armbrust; Jane Tregunno; Lesley Thompson	Canada
3rd place, bronze medalist(s)	Robyn Grey-Gardner; Karen Brancourt; Susan Chapman; Margot Foster; Susan Lee	Australia
4	Abby Peck; Patricia Spratlen; Jan Harville; Liz Miles; Valerie McClain-Ward	United States
5	Marieke van Drogenbroek; Anne-Marie Quist; Catalien Neelissen; Wiljon Vaandrager; Marty Laurijsen	Netherlands
6	Heike Neu; Sabine Hinkelmann; Kerstin Rehders; Angelika Beblo; Heidrun Barth	West Germany
7	Teresa Millar; Jean Genchi; Joanna Toch; Katie Ball; Kathy Talbot	Great Britain
8	Huang Meixia; Yang Xiao; Shi Meiping; Chen Changfeng; Zhang Liming	China
9	Park Hye-suk; Kim Jeong-nam; Kim Myeong-jae; Kim Yeong-hui; An Hae-eun	South Korea
