= Rowing at the 1984 Summer Olympics – Women's eight =

Women's eight at the Games of the XXIII Olympiad
- Date: 4 August 1984
- Competitors: 54 from 6 nations

Medalists
1st place, gold medalist(s)		Kristen Thorsness; Kristine Norelius; Shyril O'Steen; Carie Graves; Kathy Keeler; Harriet Metcalf; Betsy Beard; Carol Bower; Jeanne Flanagan	United States
2nd place, silver medalist(s)		Marioara Trașcă; Lucia Sauca; Doina Liliana Snep-Balan; Aneta Mihaly; Aurora Plesca; Camelia Diaconescu; Viorica Ioja; Mihaela Armășescu; Adriana Chelariu	Romania
3rd place, bronze medalist(s)		Wiljon Vaandrager; Marieke van Drogenbroek; Harriet van Ettekoven; Catharina Neelissen; Anne Quist; Nicolette Hellemans; Martha Laurijsen; Greet Hellemans; Lynda Cornet	Netherlands

The women's eight competition at the 1984 Summer Olympics took place at Lake Casitas, California, United States of America.

With only 6 boats in the competition, a single race was held.

== Results ==
The Romanian women had dominated the 1984 rowing competitions to this point, winning every race in each of the other events (single sculls, double sculls, quadruple sculls, coxless pair, and coxed four). The eight was the last race held, and "turned out to be surprisingly entertaining and competitive." The Romanians held a small lead over the Americans at the halfway mark, crossing at 1:29.28 to the United States' 1:29.62. But the Americans had a strong second half, breaking the finish line under the 3 minute mark—a feat which had not been accomplished before in Olympic history (the Soviets had come closest, with 3:00.19 in the first heat of the 1976 eight competition). The Romanians were not far behind, earning silver. There was also a closely contested race for the bronze medal between the Dutch and the Canadians; the former held off the latter. Great Britain started strong, running third at the halfway mark, before dropping back to fifth. West Germany came in sixth, over 5 seconds behind the Brits.

Rank	Rowers	Coxswain	Nation	Time
1st place, gold medalist(s)	Carol Bower; Jeanne Flanagan; Carie Graves; Kathy Keeler; Harriet Metcalf; Kristine Norelius; Shyril O'Steen; Kristen Thorsness	Betsy Beard	United States	2:59.80
2nd place, silver medalist(s)	Mihaela Armășescu; Adriana Bazon; Camelia Diaconescu; Aneta Mihaly; Aurora Plesca; Lucia Sauca; Doina Liliana Snep-Balan; Marioara Trașcă	Viorica Ioja	Romania	3:00.87
3rd place, bronze medalist(s)	Lynda Cornet; Marieke van Drogenbroek; Harriet van Ettekoven; Greet Hellemans; Nicolette Hellemans; Catharina Neelissen; Anne Quist; Wiljon Vaandrager	Martha Laurijsen	Netherlands	3:02.92
4	Christine Clarke; Carol Colgan; Gail Cort; Joanie Gillingham; Kathey Lichty; Cathy Lund; Lisa Robertson; Kay Worthington	Lesley Anderson-Herweck	Canada	3:03.64
5	Astrid Ayling; Ann Callaway; Alexa Forbes; Gillian Hodges; Kate Holroyd; Belinda Holmes; Sarah Hunter-Jones; Kate McNicol	Sue Bailey	Great Britain	3:04.51
6	Angelika Beblo; Ellen Becker; Sabine Hinkelmann; Klaudia Hornung; Heike Neu; Kerstin Rehders; Elke Riesenkönig; Iris Völkner	Heidrun Barth	West Germany	3:09.92
