= Susan Chapman =

Australian rower

Personal information
- Born: Susan Claire Chapman; 17 September 1962 (age 63)
- Spouse: Ion Popa
- Relatives: Rosemary Popa (daughter) Edward Popa(son)

Sport
- Sport: Rowing
Medal record
Women's rowing
Representing Australia
Olympic Games
Bronze medal – third place	1984 Los Angeles	Coxed four
Commonwealth Games
Gold medal – first place	1986 Edinburgh	Women's eight
Silver medal – second place	1986 Edinburgh	Coxed four

Susan Claire Chapman (also known as Sue Chapman-Popa or Sue Chapman, born 17 September 1962) is an Australian former national representative and Olympic rower. She represented Australia at the World Rowing Championships, winning medals at both the Commonwealth Games and Olympic Games. A national and Commonwealth Games champion, she won a bronze medal in the coxed four at the 1984 Summer Olympics, rowing in the three seat. It was Australia's first Olympic medal in women's rowing.

== Club and state rowing ==
Chapman was educated at Lauriston Girls' School where she took up rowing. Her senior club rowing was from the Melbourne University Ladies Boat Club.

Chapman's first state representative selection for Victoria came in 1983 in the women's four who contested and won the ULVA Trophy in the Interstate Regatta within the Australian Rowing Championships. She rowed in five further Victorian women's fours till 1988, each time to victory at the Interstate Regatta. In 1999 the Australian blue riband women's event switched from coxed fours to eights. At age 36 Chapman made a comeback and rowed in the bow seat of the Victorian women's eight who again won the ULVA Trophy at that year's Interstate Regatta.

== International representative rowing ==
Chapman made her Australian representative debut in the 1983 U23 Trans-Tasman series between Australian and New Zealand. She rowed in the women's coxed four who won all four of the match races at that event.

For the 1984 Los Angeles Olympics the only Australian women's sweep oared boat to qualify and be sent was the coxed four. Selectors chose the relatively inexperienced foursome of Robyn Grey-Gardner, Karen Brancourt, Margot Foster, Chapman and coxswain Susan Lee. They placed second in the heat and qualified for the final through the repechage. Fifth at the 500m the four moved into third place at the 1000m and held that spot in a thrilling finish where less than 1 second separated places three to five. The Australians beat the US to the bronze medal by less than 1/3 of a second.

At the 1985 World Rowing Championships in Hazewinkel, Chapman rowed in a coxless pair with Foster to an eighth placing. The following year at the 1986 World Rowing Championships she raced the coxed four to seventh place. That same year at the 1986 Commonwealth Games in Edinburgh, Chapman won gold in the Australian women's eight. She also doubled-up in a coxed four in which she won a silver medal.

== Personal ==
Chapman studied Physical Education and Health. Since 2007 she has run Rowing School Victoria with her husband.

In 1984 Chapman married fellow Australian Olympian Ion Popa. He had rowed for Romania before defecting to Australia in 1978. Ion was a 1986 world champion, a dual Olympian and won bronze in the Australian men's eight at the 1984 Los Angeles Olympics. Their daughter Rosemary Popa (born 1991) is an Australian national champion rower. A dual American-Australian citizen, she has represented both the US and Australia at World Rowing Championships.
