= Jean Genchi =

British rower

Personal information
- Nationality: British
- Born: 25 September 1956 (age 69) London, England

Sport
- Sport: Rowing
- Club: Stuart Ladies RC; Civil Service Ladies RC; Thames Tradesmen RC; Bradford ARC; Lea RC

Jean Genchi née Jean Guppy (born 25 September 1956) is a former British rower who competed at the 1984 Summer Olympics.

== Rowing career ==
Genchi started rowing in 1973 with the Stuart Ladies Rowing Club and as part of the junior fours the club won a title at the 1973 National Championships. Called up by the Great Britain squad in 1974 at the age of 17, she competed in the eight at the 1975 World Rowing Championships in Nottingham the following year.

She was part of the coxed four that won the national title at the 1978 National Rowing Championships. The following year she was selected by Great Britain at the 1979 World Rowing Championships and a third World Championships appearance ensued in 1983.

In 1984, Genchi was selected for the Great Britain team in the women's coxed four event. The team that consisted of Genchi, Tessa Millar, Katie Ball, Joanna Toch and Kathy Talbot finished in seventh place. The following year Genchi was part of the double sculls crew with Kate Holroyd that won the national title in a dead-heat with Sons of the Thames, rowing for Bradford Amateur Rowing Club, at the 1985 National Rowing Championships. The race was the first dead heat for winners since the start of the Championships.
