= 1985 British Rowing Championships =

- Venue: National Water Sports Centre
- Location: Holme Pierrepont (Nottingham)
- Dates: 20–21 July 1985

The 1985 National Rowing Championships was the 14th edition of the National Championships, held from 20–21 July 1985 at the National Water Sports Centre in Holme Pierrepont, Nottingham.

== Senior ==
=== Medal summary ===
Event	Gold	Silver	Bronze
Men 1x	Marlow; Steve Redgrave		
Men 2+	Vesta		
Men 2x	A.R.A Squad		
Men 2-	Molesey; David Riches & Ewan Pearson		
Men 4-	Tyrian / London University		
Men 4+	Tideway Scullers School		
Men 4x	A.R.A Squad		
Men 8+	London University		
Women 1x	Birmingham; Rhian Davies		
Women 2x	Bradford*; Jean Genchi & Kate Holroyd & Sons of the Thames*; Beryl Crockford & Lin Clark	Not Awarded	
Women 2-	Marlow / Weybridge Ladies; Belinda Holmes & Flo Johnston		
Women 4+	A.R.A Squad; Alison Bonner, Sarah Hunter-Jones, Tish Reid, Ann Callaway, Lesley Clare (cox)		
Women 4x	A.R.A Squad; Gillian Hodges, Gill Bond, Steph Price, Katie Ball		
Women 8+	A.R.A Squad	Cambridge University	

* dead heat for first place

== Lightweight ==
=== Medal summary ===
Event	Gold	Silver	Bronze
Men 1x	NCRA; Chris McManus	Kingston; Maurice Hayes	Lea; Stephen Redwood
Men 2x	A.R.A Squad		
Men 4-	Evesham / Imperial College / Lea / London		
Men 8+	Leander		
Women 1x	Furnivall SC		
Women 2x	Sons of the Thames		Not awarded
Women 4-	Clydesdale / Glasgow		

== Junior ==
=== Medal summary ===
Event	Gold	Silver	Bronze
Men 1x	Liverpool Victoria RC	Poplar, Blackwall & District RC	Derby RC
Men 2-	Hereford / Hereford Cathedral School		
Men 2x	Kingston Grammar School / Maidenhead		
Men 2+	Evesham		
Men 4-	Marlow / Shiplake College		
Men 4+	Eton College		
Men 4x	Latymer Upper		
Men 8+	Royal Shrewsbury School		
Men J16 1x	Evesham		
Men J16 2-	Hampton School		
Men J16 2x	Loughborough		
Men J16 2+	St George's College		
Men J16 4+	St George's College		
Men J16 4-	Forest School		
Men J16 4x	Marlow		
Men J16 8+	St Edward's		
Men J14 1x	Christchurch		
Men J14 2x	Forest School		
Men J14 4x	Forest School		
Women 1x	Burton Leander		
Women 2x	A.R.A Squad		
Women 2-	A.R.A Squad		
Women 4+	A.R.A Squad		
Women 8+	Composite		
Women J16 1x	Marlow		
Women J16 2x	Becket School		
Women J16 2-	Kingston Grammar School		
Women J16 4x+	St Leonard's School		
Women J14 1x	Maidenhead		
Women J14 2x	Kingston Grammar School		

== Coastal ==
=== Medal summary ===
Event	Gold	Silver	Bronze
Men 1x	Westover & Bournemouth		
Men 2-	Deal		
Men 4+	Christchurch		
Women 4+	Herne Bay		

Key

Symbol	meaning
1, 2, 4, 8	crew size
+	coxed
-	coxless
x	sculls
14	Under-14
15	Under-15
16	Under-16
J	Junior
