= Sarah Hunter-Jones =

British rower (born 1959)

Personal information
- Nationality: British
- Born: 1 February 1959 (age 66); Essex, England

Sport
- Sport: Rowing
- Club: Thames Rowing Club

Sarah Hunter-Jones, married name Sarah Daniell (born 1 February 1959), is a former British rower who competed at the 1984 Summer Olympics.

== Rowing career ==
Hunter-Jones was part of the quadruple sculls, that won the national title, rowing for a Kingston and Thames composite, with Caroline Casey, Jane Cross, Bernadette Carroll and Sue Brown (cox), at the 1981 National Championships. This led to selection for the 1981 World Rowing Championships in Munich.

In 1983 she went to her second World Championships when rowing at the 1983 World Rowing Championships at Wedau in Duisburg. The following year she was selected by Great Britain for the women's eight event at the 1984 Olympics in Los Angeles. The crew which consisted of Astrid Ayling, Ann Callaway, Alexa Forbes, Gillian Hodges, Kate Holroyd, Belinda Holmes, Kate McNicol and Sue Bailey (cox) finished in fifth place.

In 1985 she won a second national title, winning the coxed four event at the 1985 National Championships and this was followed by a third World Championship appearance at the 1985 World Rowing Championships in Belgium.
