= 1980 British Rowing Championships =

Championship

- Venue: National Water Sports Centre
- Location: Holme Pierrepont (Nottingham)
- Dates: 18–20 July 1980

The 1980 National Rowing Championships was the ninth edition of the National Championships, held from 18–20 July 1980 at the National Water Sports Centre in Holme Pierrepont, Nottingham.

== Senior ==
=== Medal summary ===
Event	Gold	Silver	Bronze
Men Victor Ludorum	Kingston		
Men 1x	Guildford; Julian Scrivener		
Men 2+	St Neots		
Men 2x	Marlow; Steve Redgrave & Adam Clift		
Men 2-	Maidenhead		
Men 4-	Leander / London		
Men 4+	Kingston		
Men 4x	Guildford / Maidenhead / Marlow		
Men 8+	London University	A.R.A Junior Composite; Kingston Grammar School/Abingdon School/Strode's College/City Orient/Emanuel School/Berkhamsted School/Latymer Upper School; Graham Faultless, Andrew Spalding, Adrian Genziani, Paul Carter, Salih Hassan, Graeme Wells, Dave Skinner, Jeremy Page, Richard Baxell	
Whitbread Sprint	London University		
Women Victor Ludorum	Thames		
Women 1x	Thames; Steph Price		
Women 2x	Oxford University		
Women 2-	Weybridge Ladies; Kate Panter & Belinda Holmes		
Women 4+	Thames		
Women 4x	Thames Tradesmen's		
Women 8+	Cambridge University		

== Lightweight ==
=== Medal summary ===
Event	Gold	Silver	Bronze
Men 1x	Kingston		
Men 2x	Nottingham		
Men 4-	Wallingford		
Men 8+	Leander / Molesey / London / Royal Navy		

== Junior ==
=== Medal summary ===
Event	Gold	Silver	Bronze
Men Victor Ludorum	St Edward's School		
Men 1x	Northwich		
Men 2-	Royal Shrewsbury School		
Men 2x	Marlow		
Men 2+	Wallingford Schools		
Men 4-	St Edward's School		
Men 4+	Abingdon / Belmont Abbey / Marlow / Molesey		
Men 4x	Bewdley / Nottingham / Poplar / Thames Tradesmen's		
Men 8+	A.R.A Composite; Kingston Grammar School/Abingdon School/Strode's College/City Orient/Emanuel School/Berkhamsted School/Latymer Upper School; Graham Faultless, Andrew Spalding, Adrian Genziani, Paul Carter, Salih Hassan, Graeme Wells, Dave Skinner, Jeremy Page, Richard Baxell		
Men J16 1x	City Orient		
Men J16 2-	Hampton School		
Men J16 2x	Kingston / Twickenham		
Men J16 2+	St Edward's School		
Men J16 4+	St Edward's School		
Men J16 4-	Nottingham		
Men J16 8+	Emanuel School		
Women Victor Ludorum	Weybridge Ladies		
Women 1x	Broxbourne		
Women 2x	Oxford University		
Women 2+	Wallingford Schools		
Women 2-	Weybridge Ladies		
Women 4+	Wallingford Schools		
Women 8+	A.R.A Composite		

Key

Symbol	meaning
1, 2, 4, 8	crew size
+	coxed
-	coxless
x	sculls
14	Under-14
15	Under-15
16	Under-16
J	Junior
