= Kate McNicol =

British rower

Personal information
- Nationality: British
- Born: 19 July 1961 (age 64); Barry, Vale of Glamorgan, Wales

Sport
- Sport: Rowing
- Club: Lea

Kate McNicol (born 19 July 1961) is a former British rower who competed at the 1984 Summer Olympics.

== Rowing career ==
McNicol was part of the coxless fours crew, with Tessa Millar, Kareen Marwick, Katie Ball and Sue Bailey, that won the national title rowing for the A.R.A Squad, at the 1983 National Rowing Championships. She was selected to represent Great Britain at the 1984 Olympic Games in the women's eight event. The crew of Ann Callaway, Alexa Forbes, Gill Hodges, Kate Holroyd, Belinda Holmes, Sarah Hunter-Jones and Sue Bailey finished in fifth place.
