= Alexa Forbes =

British rower (born 1961)

Personal information
- Born: 2 April 1961 (age 65) Darlington, England

Sport
- Sport: Rowing
- Club: Nottingham RC
Medal record
Rowing
Representing England
Commonwealth Games
| Gold medal – first place | 1986 Edinburgh | Ltw coxless four |

Alexa Forbes (born 2 April 1961) is a British retired rower who competed at the 1984 Summer Olympics.

== Early life ==
Born in Darlington, she grew up in Newark-on-Trent, the daughter of rower Brian Forbes, and sister of Stuart Forbes (rower).

== Rowing career ==
Forbes was part of the eight, that won the national title rowing for Great Britain senior squad boat, at the 1981 National Championships. This led to selection for the 1981 World Rowing Championships in Munich. The following year she was part of the eight that won the national title, rowing for an A.R.A squad, at the 1982 National Rowing Championships. Subsequently she went to her second World Championships, rowing at the 1982 World Rowing Championships in Lucerne.

In 1984, she was selected to represent Great Britain in the women's eight event at the 1980 Olympics in Moscow. The team which consisted of Astrid Ayling, Ann Callaway, Gillian Hodges, Kate Holroyd, Belinda Holmes, Sarah Hunter-Jones, Kate McNicol and Sue Bailey (cox) finished in fifth place.

She represented England and won a gold medal in the lightweight coxless four, at the 1986 Commonwealth Games in Edinburgh, Scotland.
