= Sue Bailey =

Sue Bailey may refer to:

- Susan Bailey (born 1950), British psychiatrist and academic
- Sue Bailey (rowing) (born 1961), British rowing cox
- Sue Bailey (table tennis) (born 1972), British para table tennis player
- Sue Bailey Thurman (née Sue Elvie Bailey, 1903–1996), American author, lecturer, historian and civil rights activist
