= Teresa Millar =

British rower

Tessa Millar
Personal information
- Nationality: British
- Born: 22 September 1956 (age 68); Northampton, England

Sport
- Sport: Rowing
- Club: St Aidan’s College BC; Durham University Boat Club, Thames; Kingston RC; Tideway Scullers School; Sport Imperial

Teresa Millar also known as Tessa (born 22 September 1956) is a British rower who competed at the 1984 Summer Olympics.

== Rowing career ==
Millar began rowing at the Durham University Boat Club becoming the women's captain of Durham University Athletics Union. In 1979 she joined the Thames Rowing Club after moving to London. She won a bronze medal in the eight, at the 1982 National Rowing Championships.

Millar was part of the coxless fours crew, with Katie Ball, Kareen Marwick, Kate McNicol and Sue Bailey, that won the national title rowing for the A.R.A Squad, at the 1983 National Rowing Championships. Also during 1983 she competed at the 1983 World Rowing Championships in Wedau, Duisburg.

She was selected to represent Great Britain at the 1984 Olympic Games in the women's coxed four event. The crew of Millar, Katie Ball, Jean Genchi, Joanna Toch and Kathy Talbot finished in seventh place. She competed in her third World Championships during 1985 at the 1985 World Rowing Championships in Hazewinkel, Belgium.
