= Lady Redgrave =

Lady Redgrave may refer to:

- Rachel Kempson, wife of Sir Michael Redgrave
- Ann Redgrave, wife of Sir Steve Redgrave
