= Lisa Robertson =

Lisa Robertson may refer to:

- Lisa Robertson (writer) (born 1961), Canadian poet, essayist and translator
- Lisa Robertson (footballer) (born 1992), Scottish footballer
- Lisa Robertson (rower) (born 1961), Canadian rower
