= St Edward's School Boat Club =

British rowing club

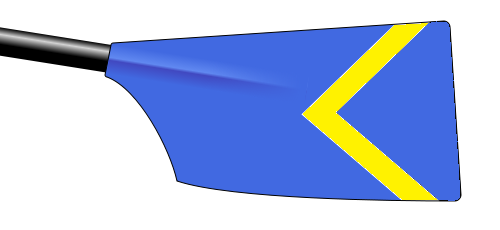
- Location: St Edward's School Boathouse, Godstow Road, Oxford, Oxfordshire
- Coordinates: 51.779729°N 1.297374°W
- Home water: River Thames at Port Meadow
- Founded: 1877
- Affiliations: British Rowing boat code - SES
- Website: www.stedwardsoxford.org/beyond-the-classroom/sports/rowing/

St Edward's School Boat Club is a rowing club on the River Thames based at St Edwards School Boathouse on Godstow Road, Oxford, Oxfordshire. It is the rowing club belonging to St Edward's School, Oxford (also known as Teddies).

== History ==
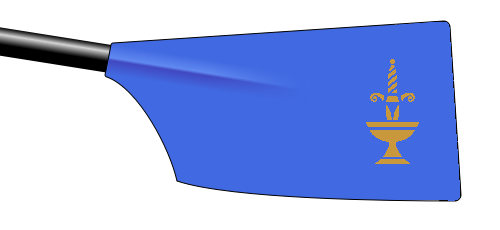
First VIII blade

Rowing is one of the major sport choices available to pupils at the School. The club was founded in 1877, 14 years after the school moved to its current site in Summertown. Initially, there was 'skiffing' and four IVs were raced on the canal. Within two years rowing became a compulsory sport in the Lent Term of 1879, alongside cricket and rugby and it was agreed to stage bumping races on 25th March with two Divisions each of six boats. 'Bumpers' as they were known, continued until the 1970s and are being reintroduced in the Autumn term of 2024. Old St Edwardians or OSE (former pupils) have their own rowing club called the Martyrs Boat Club.

In the early years, rowing was an internal sport with school crews racing each other. The first competitive race against another school took place in 1888 against St Mark's Windsor. The first OSE to row in the Oxford vs Cambridge Boat Race was Percy Underhill who rowed for Oxford in 1904. Since then the club has produced many talented oarsmen and women who have competed internationally and at the Olympic Games.

The club is responsible for the founding of the National Schools' Regatta which was first raced in 1947 as the "Colts and Third Eights Regatta". A teacher named Desmond Hill who at the time was responsible for rowing at the School, invited teams from Shrewsbury, Bedford and Radley to race against St. Edwards in Godstow. The club has won the coveted 'Triple' (Princess Elizabeth Challenge Cup at Henley Royal Regatta, the Queen Mother Cup at the National Schools' Regatta and the Schools' Head of the River Race) on one occasion in 1984. The Club has won The Princess Elizabeth Challenge Cup at Henley Royal Regatta on five occasions. The only British schools to have won the event more than this are Eton College and St Paul's School, London. In 2023, the Boat Club became the first co-educational school to win Gold in Championship events for both boys and girls in the same National School's Regatta, winning the Jim Mason Plate for Girls Coxed Fours (for the second time) and the Queen Mother Challenge Cup for Boys Eights (for the fourth time).

== Honours ==
=== National champions ===
Year	Winning crew
1975	MJ16 2+, MJ16 4+
1976	J Victor Ludorum, MJ18 2-, MJ16 2-, MJ16 2+, MJ16 4+, MJ16 4-
1977	MJ18 4+, MJ16 4-
1978	MJ18 4+ composite, MJ18 8+ composite
1980	J Victor Ludorum, MJ18 4-, MJ16 2+, MJ16 4+
1981	J Victor Ludorum, MJ18 2-, MJ16 2+, MJ18 8+ composite
1983	MJ18 2+
1984	MJ16 8+
1985	MJ16 8+
1993	MJ16 2x composite
1998	MJ16 4+, MJ14 1 x
2000	MJ18 4+ composite
2004	WJ18 4- composite
2005	W4- composite

Key

- M men, O open, W women, +coxed, -coxless, x sculls, J junior, 18 16 age group

=== Schools' Head of the River ===
Year	Winning crew
1983	Championship 8+
1984	Championship 8+
1997	Championship 8+
1998	Championship 8+

=== National Schools' Regatta ===
Year	Winning crew (Championship Boys Eights)	Winning crew (Championship Girls Coxed Fours)
1979	Queen Mother Challenge Cup	
1984	Queen Mother Challenge Cup	
1993	Queen Mother Challenge Cup	
2003		Jim Mason Plate
2023	Queen Mother Challenge Cup	Jim Mason Plate

=== Henley Royal Regatta ===
Year	Winning crew
1958	Princess Elizabeth Challenge Cup
1959	Princess Elizabeth Challenge Cup
1977	Special Race for Schools
1983	Special Race for Schools
1984	Princess Elizabeth Challenge Cup
1986	Special Race for Schools
1999	Princess Elizabeth Challenge Cup
2023	Princess Elizabeth Challenge Cup

== See also ==
- Rowing on the River Thames
