= Joanie Gillingham =

Canadian rower

Personal information
- Nationality: Canadian
- Born: 21 February 1961 (age 64); Twentynine Palms, California, United States

Sport
- Sport: Rowing

Joanie Gillingham (born 21 February 1961) is a Canadian rower. She competed in the women's eight event at the 1984 Summer Olympics.
