= Park Hye-suk =

South Korean rower

Personal information
- Nationality: South Korean
- Born: 15 July 1964 (age 61)

Sport
- Sport: Rowing

Park Hye-suk (Korean: 박혜숙; born 15 July 1964) is a South Korean rower. She competed in the women's coxed four event at the 1984 Summer Olympics.
