= Carol Colgan =

Canadian rower

Personal information
- Born: 12 April 1960 (age 65) St. Catharines, Ontario, Canada

Sport
- Sport: Rowing

Carol Colgan (born 12 April 1960) is a Canadian rower. She competed in the women's eight event at the 1984 Summer Olympics.
