= Lesley Anderson-Herweck =

Canadian rower

Personal information
- Born: 6 April 1961 (age 63); North Bay, Ontario, Canada

Sport
- Sport: Rowing

Lesley Anderson-Herweck (born 6 April 1961) is a Canadian rowing cox. She competed in the women's eight event at the 1984 Summer Olympics.
