= Valerie McClain-Ward =

American rower

Personal information
- Born: February 14, 1956 (age 69); Berkeley, California, United States

Sport
- Sport: Rowing

Valerie McClain-Ward (born February 14, 1956) is an American rowing coxswain. She competed in the women's coxed four event at the 1984 Summer Olympics.
