= Katie Ball =

British rower

Personal information
- Nationality: British
- Born: 8 June 1963 (age 62); Bishop's Stortford, England

Sport
- Sport: Rowing
- Club: Broxbourne RC; Lea Rowing Club; Thames RC; Tideway Scullers School

Kathryn Katie Ball (born 8 June 1963) is a former British rower who competed at the 1984 Summer Olympics. In 2024 Ball was awarded a Lifetime Achievement Award for her exceptional contribution to women's rowing.

== Rowing career ==
Ball began rowing as a teenager at for Broxbourne Rowing Club. She was selected for the 1979 FISA Junior Championships but fell ill and did not compete. However the following year she did row in the 1980 and 1981 FISA Junior Championships.

Ball was part of the coxless fours crew, with Tessa Millar, Kareen Marwick, Kate McNicol and Sue Bailey, that won the national title rowing for the A.R.A Squad, at the 1983 National Rowing Championships which led to selection for the Great Britain team at the 1983 World Rowing Championships.

She was selected to represent Great Britain at the 1984 Olympic Games in the women's coxed four event. The crew of Ball, Millar, Jean Genchi, Joanna Toch and Kathy Talbot finished in seventh place. Another final World Championship appearance ensued in 1985.
