= Kathey Lichty =

Canadian rower

Personal information
- Born: 16 October 1957 (age 67); North Bay, Ontario, Canada

Sport
- Sport: Rowing

Kathey Lichty (born 16 October 1957) is a Canadian rower. She competed in the women's eight event at the 1984 Summer Olympics.
