= Florica Lavric =

Romanian rower (1962–2014)

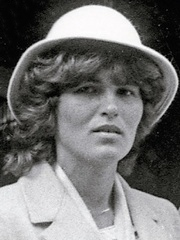

Personal information
- Born: 7 January 1962 Copălău, Romania
- Died: 20 June 2014 (aged 52) Bucharest, Romania
- Height: 181 cm (5 ft 11 in)
- Weight: 80 kg (176 lb)

Sport
- Sport: Rowing
- Club: Steaua Bucharest
Medal record
Representing Romania
Olympic Games
Gold medal – first place	1984 Los Angeles	Coxed four
World Rowing Championships
Silver medal – second place	1983 Dusiburg	Coxed four
Silver medal – second place	1985 Hazewinkel	Coxed four
Bronze medal – third place	1986 Nottingham	Eight

Florica Lavric (7 January 1962 – 20 June 2014) was a Romanian rower. Competing in coxed fours she won an Olympic gold medal in 1984 and world championship silver medals in 1983 and 1985. In 1987, she contracted meningitis and retired from competitions. She died from lung cancer aged 52.
