= Pengwern Boat Club =

British rowing club

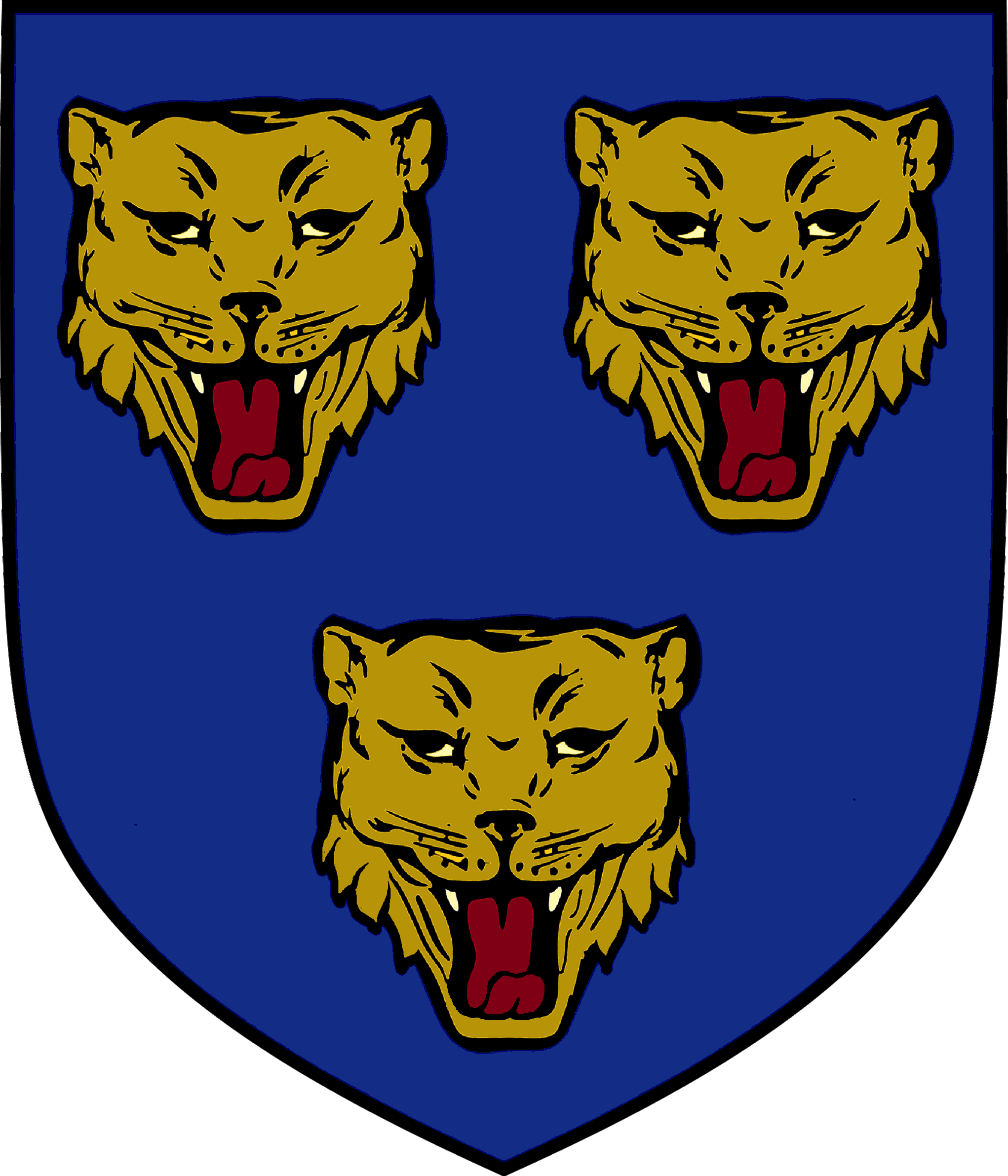

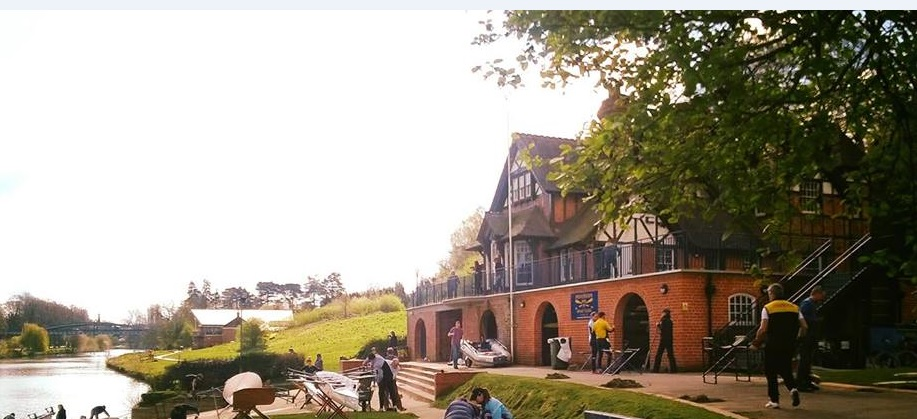

- Motto: Floreat Salopia
- Location: Shrewsbury, Shropshire
- Coordinates: 52°42′19.3″N 2°45′47.1″W
- Home water: Shrewsbury
- Founded: 1871
- Membership: Open
- Affiliations: British Rowing boat code - PGN Harper Adams University RC
- Website: www.pengwern-rowing.co.uk

Events
- Shrewsbury Regatta

Notable members
- Lord Kingsland

Pengwern Boat Club is the community rowing club in Shrewsbury, UK. It was founded in 1871.

The club is affiliated to British Rowing, and its home water is on the River Severn around Shrewsbury, with rowing taking place from the English Bridge in Shrewsbury up to Berwick House, upstream of the town.

The stretch of the River Severn it occupies is shared with Royal Shrewsbury School Boat Club (RSSBC).

== History ==
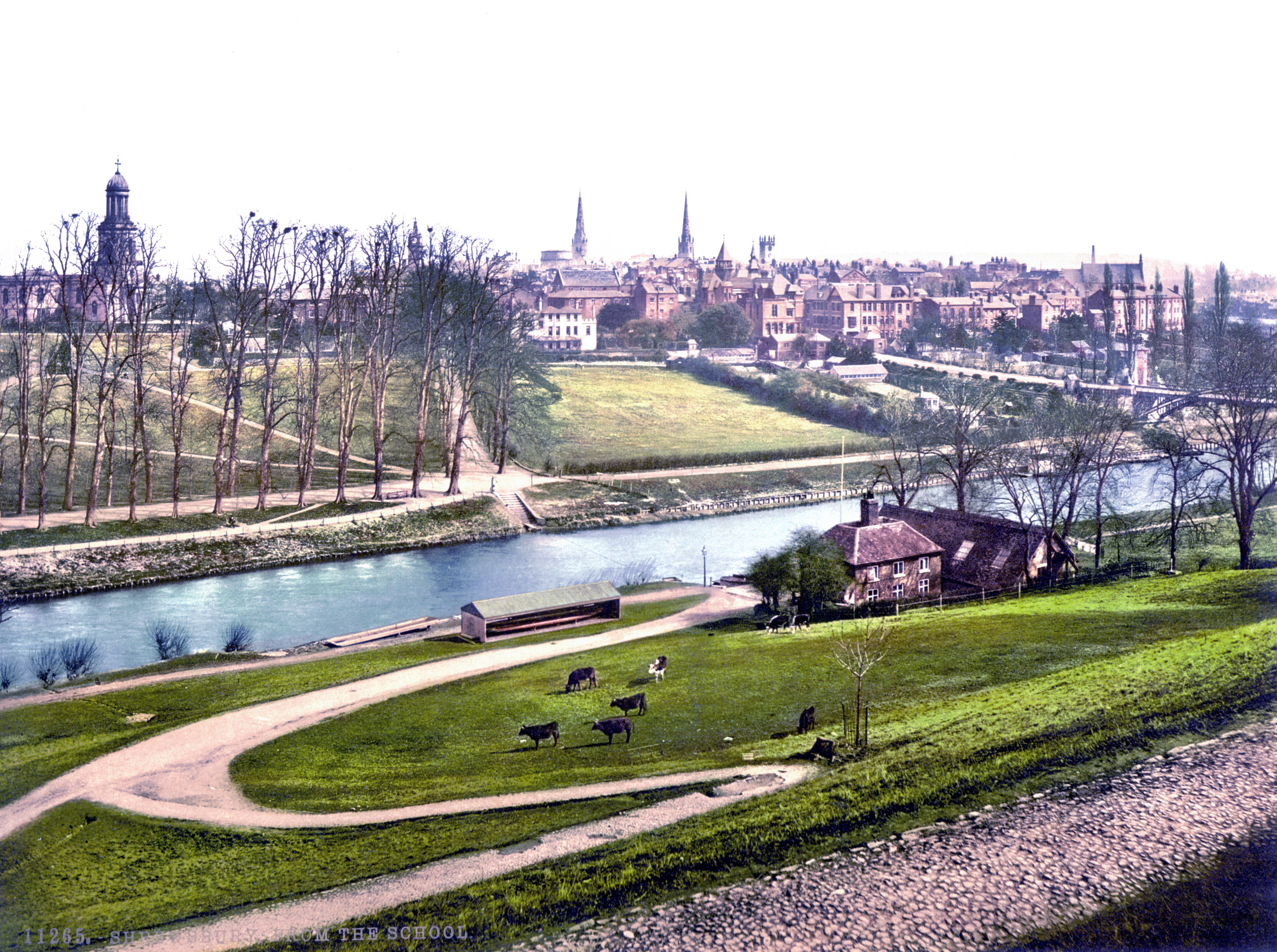
A view of the River Severn in Shrewsbury immediately down stream of the Pengwern Boat House looking over the Shrewsbury School boat house in 1900.

The name "Pengwern" (recalling the lost early seat of the kings of Powys) was chosen because a "Shrewsbury Rowing Club" was already in existence by 1871, when the club was founded; the latter club was found to be so socially and culturally elitist - strictly applying an 'armature ethic' - that a more cosmopolitan club was required to promote an inclusive community for boating enthusiasts in Shrewsbury. Over time, this more diverse club was so successful in attracting and keeping members that the former club was totally supplanted by the turn of the twentieth century.

Over the course of its history the club has maintained close links with the boat club of the RSSBC, which Neil Wigglesworth has noted as being important in recruitment to the club.

The club had been men-only from its foundation. However, the constitution was changed in the early 1970s to enable women to join.

== Events ==
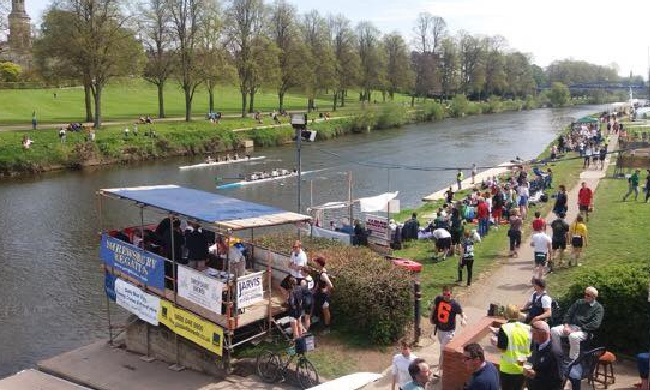
Shrewsbury Regatta happens annually in May, and is arranged by Pengwern Boat Club

=== Shrewsbury Regatta ===
In early May every year the club hosts the Shrewsbury Regatta, attended by thousands of spectators and visitors, which is one of the oldest events in the rowing calendar, having first been held in 1871.

=== Head of the Severn ===
In 1936 the "Head of the Severn", one of the earliest head of the river events, was instigated by the club; it was subsequently discontinued in the 1990s because of frequent floods and other practicalities.

== Club House ==
The first boathouse was jointly rented with Shrewsbury School on the current site.

The current club house of brick and timber was built in 1881. It is now a Grade II listed building.

The club house was expanded around 2013.

Two of the five boat bays have been refurbished through late 2025 and into early 2026.

== Squads ==
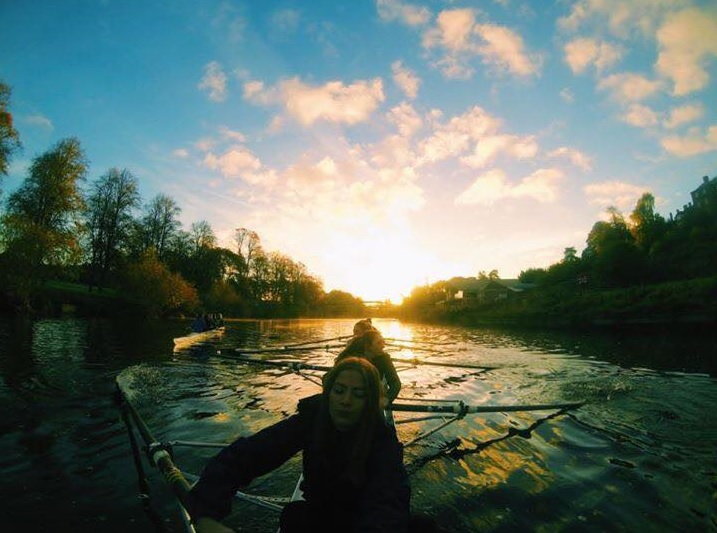
Novice rowers from Harper Adams University learning to row at Pengwern Boat Club

The club operates rowing squads for:

- juniors,
- seniors, and
- masters.

It also provides for adaptive rowing for those with physical disability, sensory, or learning impairment.

In addition, at times agreed with the committee the runs Pengwern some of the lobby clubs (see below) have squads they run semi-autonomously.

== Other events ==
The club hosts an annual pubs and clubs regatta as well as coracle racing from time to time.

== Lobby clubs ==
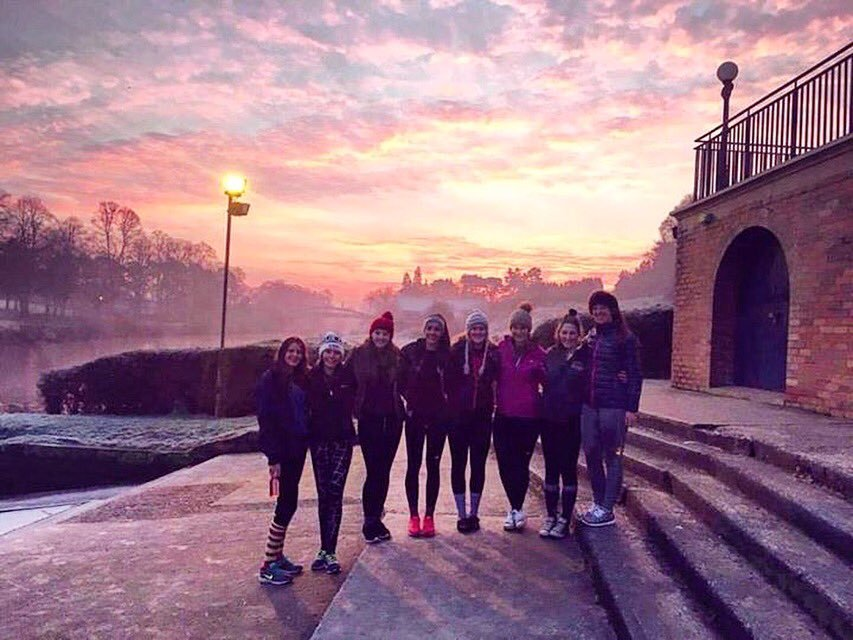
Women members of the Harper Adams University Rowing club at early morning winter training at Pengwern Boat Club

Since 2014, Pengwern has hosted the water facilities for the Harper Adams University Rowing Club, which is a UK rowing university separately affiliated to British Rowing.

The club also hosts the rowing activities of Shrewsbury High School and other local schools.

== Honours ==
=== British champions ===
Year	Winning crew/s
1984	Women 2x composite
1986	Women 2x composite
