= George Acsinteanu =

Romanian prose writer

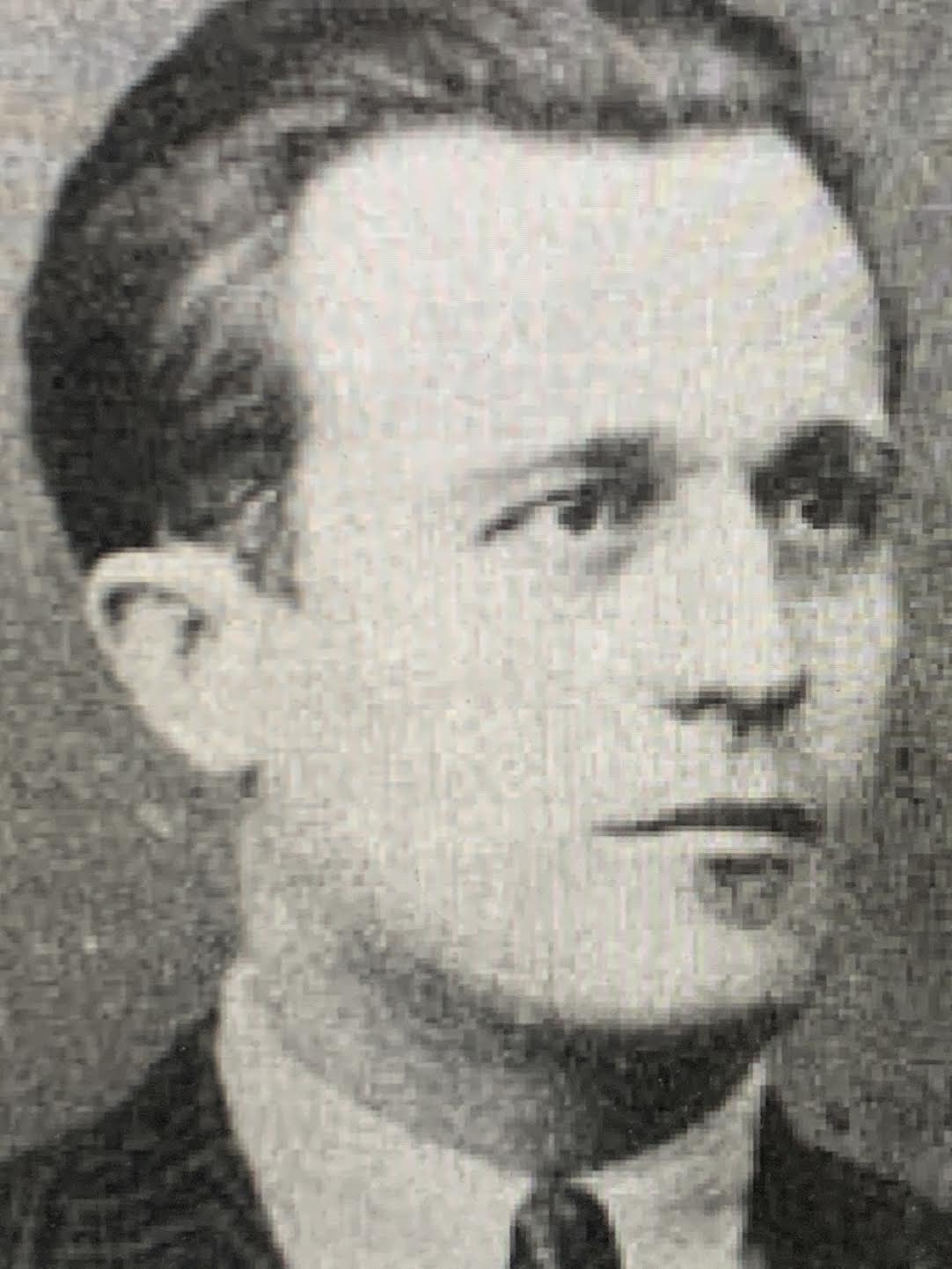
George Acsinteanu

George Acsinteanu (July 13, 1905 – December 13, 1987) was a Romanian prose writer.

Born in Panduri village, Frumușica-Acsintele commune, Ialomița County, his parents were Constantin Acsinteanu, a carpenter, and his wife Elena (née Costache Luca), a peasant. After attending primary school in his native village, he went on to high school in Bucharest, Călărași and Odorhei. Acsinteanu attended the faculties of literature and law at the University of Bucharest and Cernăuți University. His first published work appeared in Ritmul vremii; other contributions were published in Falanga, Universul literar, Gândirea, Vremea, Convorbiri Literare, Clipa, Universul, Dimineața, Cultura Poporului, Țara Noastră, Ecoul and Orizonturi.

He headed Pan magazine and, from 1926 to 1930, was secretary of the literary circle affiliated with the Institute of Literature and Bibliography led by Mihail Dragomirescu. Acsinteanu was a proofreader for Chemarea and Facla and editing secretary at Ilustrațiunea română. His first novel, prefaced by Liviu Rebreanu, was Piatra neagră (1930); there followed Povestiri pentru îngerii pământului, 1932; Convoiul flămânzilor, 1935; Prințul Bărăganului, 1935; Copilul norilor, 1936; and Escadrila albă, 1937.

Acsinteanu led an unsettled life, working jobs that were often completely unrelated: tinker's apprentice, typographer, teacher, librarian, editor at Țara Noastră, literary secretary at Romanian Radio, servant at a tavern in Călărași. The pattern continued after 1944: cowherd, technical adviser at a state collective farm and legal adviser in Tulcea and Cernavodă. He died in Sibiu.
