= Henley discontinued events =

Rowing events

Henley Royal Regatta (discontinued events)
- Venue: Henley Royal Regatta, River Thames
- Location: Henley-on-Thames, Oxfordshire

Henley discontinued events are discontinued rowing events at the annual Henley Royal Regatta on the River Thames at Henley-on-Thames in England.

(A list of current events may be found at the end of the main HRR article, including links to articles with lists of past winners and runners-up).

== Discontinued Events ==
=== Town Challenge Cup ===
for men's club fours, 1839 - 1883; trophy now awarded at the Henley Town & Visitors' Regatta 

=== Prince Philip Challenge Cup ===
the premier event for men's coxed fours (M4+), from 1963 until 2003, when it was withdrawn owing to declining interest in 4+ racing.

=== District Challenge Cup ===
for coxed fours, 1840 – 1845

==== Winners ====
Year	Winner	Runner-Up
1840	Dreadnought Club, Henley	Albion Club, Henley
1841	Dreadnought Club, Henley	Leander Club
1842	Windsor & Eton Club	Dolphin Club, Oxford
1843	Albion Club, Henley	
1844	Windsor & Eton Club	Reading Britannia Club
1845	Henley Aquatic Club	Windsor & Eton Club

=== Public Schools Challenge Cup ===
for coxed fours, 1879 – 1884

(Transferred to Marlow Regatta from 1885 until 1914 when it was won by Monkton Combe School; it was returned to the Henley Royal Regatta programme in 1919.)

==== Winners ====
Year	Winner	Runner-Up
1879	Cheltenham College	Radley College
1880	Bedford Grammar School	Magdalen College School, Oxford
1881	Bedford Grammar School	Bath College
1882	Magdalen College School, Oxford	Christ's Hospital School
1883	Hertford College, Oxford	Bedford Grammar School
1884	Derby School	Hertford School

=== Presentation Cup ===
for Fours without Coxswain, 1869 – 1872

==== Winners ====
Year	Winner	Runner-Up
1869	Oxford Radleian Club	Oscillators Club, Kingston
1872	London Rowing Club	

=== District Goblets ===
for Pair Oars, 1861 – 1867

==== Winners ====
Year	Winner	Runner-Up
1861	JO Hopkins & G Norsworthy	ED Mackenzie & G Hay
1864	H Hunt & FW Pescud, Henley	B Todd & W Crouch, Henley
1865	LW Carter & HL Cripps, Eton & Parmoor	RH Barrett & W Barrett, Eton College
1866	GH Morrell & F Willan, Oxford	Day & G Westfall, Reading
1867	F Pickett & J Plowman, Oxford City Club	

=== Special Race for Schools ===
for school/junior eights, 1976 – 1989; introduced for school crews having particularly difficult examination schedules 

==== Past winners ====
Year	Winner	Runner-Up	ref
1976	Shrewsbury School	Radley College	
1977	St Edward's School	Radley College	
1978	Bedford School	Shrewsbury School	
1979	St. Paul's School	St Edward's School	
1980	Shrewsbury School	Radley College	
1981	Shrewsbury School	St Edward's School	
1982	Shrewsbury School	Radley College	
1983	St Edward's School	Shrewsbury School	
1984	Shrewsbury School	Cheltenham College	
1985	Shrewsbury School	The King's School, Canterbury	
1986	St Edward's School	Shrewsbury School	
1987	Radley College	The King's School, Canterbury	
1988	Radley College	St Edward's School	
1989	Bedford Modern School	St. Paul's School	

=== Silver Wherry ===
 for local amateur scullers, 1846 – 1856

==== Past winners ====
Year	Winner	Runner-Up
1846	Harry Sergeant, Henley	A Ive, Henley
1847	Harry Sergeant, Henley	H Farley
1848	Harry Sergeant, Henley	E Besley, Henley
1849	EJ Giles, Henley	A Ive, Henley
1850	F Williams, Henley	JH Brooks, Henley
1851	A Ive, Henley	W Popjoy, Wallingford
1852	T Piper, Caversham	JH Brooks, Henley
1853	W Popjoy, Wallingford	WH Dormer, Caversham
1856	EJ Giles, Henley	T Piper, Caversham

=== Women's Invitation Coxed Fours ===
1981, 1982

==== Past winners ====
Year	Winner	Runner-Up
1981	1980 Rowing Club, USA	Adanac, Canada
1982	Boston University, USA	Princeton University, USA

=== Women's Invitation Double Sculls ===
1981, 1982

==== Past winners ====
Year	Winner		Runner-Up	
1981	Lisa Roy & Janice Mason	Adanac, Canada	Judy Geer & Charlotte Geer	Dartmouth, USA
1982	Rosie Clugston & Astrid Ayling	Borough Road / Kingston	Haldis Lenes & Solfrid Johansen	Trondheim Roklubb, Norway
