= Klaudia Hornung =

German rower (1962–2022)

Personal information
- Nationality: German
- Born: 23 January 1962; Frankfurt, Germany
- Died: 31 August 2022 (aged 60); Frankfurt am Main, Germany

Sport
- Sport: Rowing

Klaudia Hornung (23 January 1962 – 31 August 2022) was a German rower. She competed in the women's eight event at the 1984 Summer Olympics.
