= Belinda Holmes =

British rower

Personal information
- Nationality: British
- Born: 8 February 1962 (age 63) Watford, England

Sport
- Sport: Rowing
- Club: Weybridge Ladies

Belinda Holmes (born 8 February 1962) is a former British rower who competed at the 1984 Summer Olympics.

== Rowing career ==
Holmes was part of the eight, that won the national title rowing for Great Britain senior squad boat, at the 1981 National Championships. and was part of the eight that won the national title, rowing for an A.R.A squad, at the 1982 National Rowing Championships. The following year she was part of the composite quadruple sculls crew with Bev Jones, Mary Wilson, Alexa Forbes and C Grant, that won the national title, at the 1983 National Rowing Championships.

She was selected to represent Great Britain at the 1984 Olympic Games in the women's eight event. The crew of Ann Callaway, Alexa Forbes, Gill Hodges, Kate Holroyd, Kate McNicol, Sarah Hunter-Jones and Sue Bailey finished in fifth place.

In 1985 she was part of the coxless pairs crew, with Flo Johnston that won the national title rowing for a Marlow and Weybridge Ladies composite, at the 1985 National Rowing Championships.
