= Chen Changfeng =

Chinese rower

Personal information
- Nationality: Chinese
- Born: 7 November 1960 (age 64)

Sport
- Sport: Rowing

Chen Changfeng (born 7 November 1960) is a Chinese rower. She competed in the women's coxed four event at the 1984 Summer Olympics.
