= Axintele =

- Commune
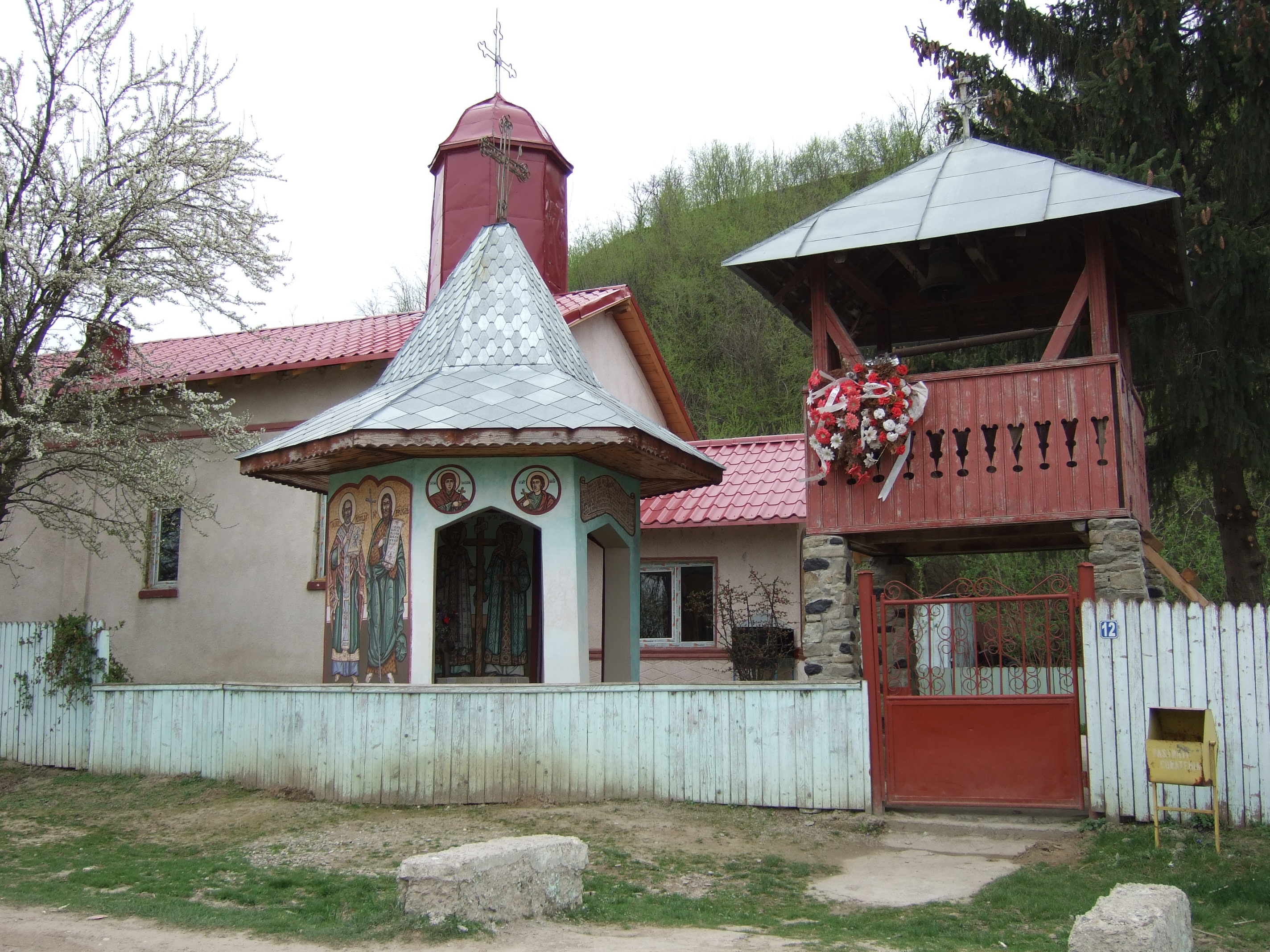
- Church in Bărbătescu

- Location in Ialomița County

- Location in Romania
- Coordinates: 44°36′N 26°47′E
- Country: Romania
- County: Ialomița

Government
  - Mayor (2020–2024): Tudor Grigore (PSD)
- Area: 121.72 km^{2} (47.00 sq mi)
- Elevation: 43 m (141 ft)
- Population (2021-12-01): 2,218
  - Density: 18.22/km^{2} (47.20/sq mi)
- Time zone: UTC+02:00 (EET)
  - Summer (DST): UTC+03:00 (EEST)
- Postal code: 927035
- Area code: +(40) 243
- Vehicle reg.: IL
- Website: www.axintele.ro

Axintele is a commune located in Ialomița County, Muntenia, Romania. It is composed of three villages: Axintele, Bărbătescu, and Horia.

Historical population
Year	Pop.	±%
1899	1,317	—
1925	1,903	+44.5%
2002	2,944	+54.7%
2011	2,657	−9.7%
2021	2,218	−16.5%
Source: Census data

== Notable residents ==
- George Acsinteanu (1905–1987), prose writer
- Aneta Mihaly (born 1957), rower
