= Maria Fricioiu =

Romanian rower (born 1960)

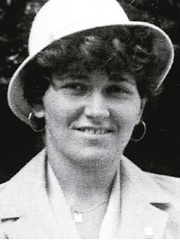

Personal information
- Born: 16 March 1960 (age 66) Grădinari, Romania
- Height: 181 cm (5 ft 11 in)
- Weight: 81 kg (179 lb)

Sport
- Sport: Rowing
- Club: Dinamo Bucharest
Medal record
Representing Romania
Olympic Games
Gold medal – first place	1984 Los Angeles	Coxed four
World Rowing Championships
Bronze medal – third place	1979 Bled	Coxed four
Silver medal – second place	1983 Duisburg	Coxed four
Silver medal – second place	1985 Hazewinkel	Coxed four

Maria Fricioiu (later Simion, born 16 March 1960) is a retired Romanian rower. Competing in coxed fours she won an Olympic gold medal in 1984 and three medals at the world championships in 1979, 1983 and 1985.
