= Sue Bailey (rowing) =

British rower

Personal information
- Nationality: British
- Born: 15 February 1961 (age 64); London, England

Sport
- Sport: Rowing
- Club: Lea Rowing Club

Sue Bailey (born 15 February 1961) is a former British rowing cox who competed at the 1984 Summer Olympics.

== Rowing career ==
At the age of 14, Bailey coxed the four of Jackie Darling, Pauline Bird, Diana Bishop and Gill Webb to victory at the 1975 National Championships. This led to selection as cox for the eight at the 1975 World Rowing Championships in Nottingham, the crew finished 10th overall after a fourth-place finish in the B final.

Bailey was part of the coxless fours crew, with Tessa Millar, Kareen Marwick, Katie Ball and Kate McNicol, that won the national title rowing for the A.R.A Squad, at the 1983 National Rowing Championships.

She was selected to represent Great Britain at the 1984 Olympic Games in the women's eight event. The crew of Astrid Ayling, Ann Callaway, Alexa Forbes, Gill Hodges, Kate Holroyd, Belinda Holmes, Sarah Hunter-Jones and McNicol finished in seventh place.
