= Chira Apostol =

Romanian rower (born 1960)

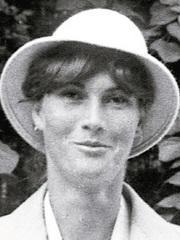

Personal information
- Born: 1 June 1960 (age 66) Alexeni, Romania
- Height: 180 cm (5 ft 11 in)
- Weight: 78 kg (172 lb)

Sport
- Sport: Rowing
Medal record
Representing Romania
Olympic Games
Gold medal – first place	1984 Los Angeles	Coxed four
World Championships
Silver medal – second place	1983 Duisburg	Coxed four
Silver medal – second place	1985 Hazewinkel	Coxed four
Gold medal – first place	1986 Nottingham	Coxed four

Chira Irina Apostol (later Stoean, born 1 June 1960) is a retired Romanian rower who competed in coxed fours. In this event she won an Olympic gold medal in 1984 and silver medals at the world championships in 1983 and 1985. She competed at the 1986 World Rowing Championships under her married name.
