= Elke Riesenkönig =

German rower

Personal information
- Nationality: German
- Born: 9 November 1965 (age 59); Viña del Mar, Chile

Sport
- Sport: Rowing

Elke Riesenkönig (born 9 November 1965) is a German rower. She competed in the women's eight event at the 1984 Summer Olympics.
