= Viorica Ioja =

Romanian rower

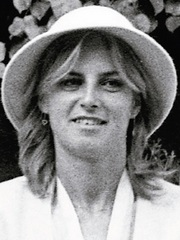

Personal information
- Born: 26 February 1962 (age 64) Uivar, Romania
- Height: 155 cm (5 ft 1 in)
- Weight: 43 kg (95 lb)

Sport
- Sport: Rowing
- Club: Politehnica Timișoara; Nautic ASE; Steaua Bucharest
Medal record
Representing Romania
Olympic Games
Gold medal – first place	1984 Los Angeles	Coxed four
Silver medal – second place	1984 Los Angeles	Eight
World Rowing Championships
Silver medal – second place	1983 Duisburg	Coxed four
Silver medal – second place	1985 Hazewinkel	Coxed four
Gold medal – first place	1986 Nottingham	Coxed four

Viorica Ioja (later Vereş; born 26 February 1962) is a retired Romanian rowing coxswain. Competing in coxed fours she won an Olympic gold medal in 1984 and the world title in 1986, placing second in 1983 and 1985.
