= Liz Miles =

American rower

Personal information
- Born: January 25, 1955 (age 70); Fresno, California, United States

Sport
- Sport: Rowing

Liz Miles (born January 25, 1955) is an American rower. She competed in the women's coxed four event at the 1984 Summer Olympics.
