= An Hae-eun =

South Korean rower

Personal information
- Nationality: South Korean
- Born: 7 May 1963 (age 62)

Sport
- Sport: Rowing

An Hae-eun (Korean: 안해은; born 7 May 1963) is a South Korean rowing coxswain. She competed in the women's coxed four event at the 1984 Summer Olympics.
