= Royal Shrewsbury School Boat Club =

British rowing club

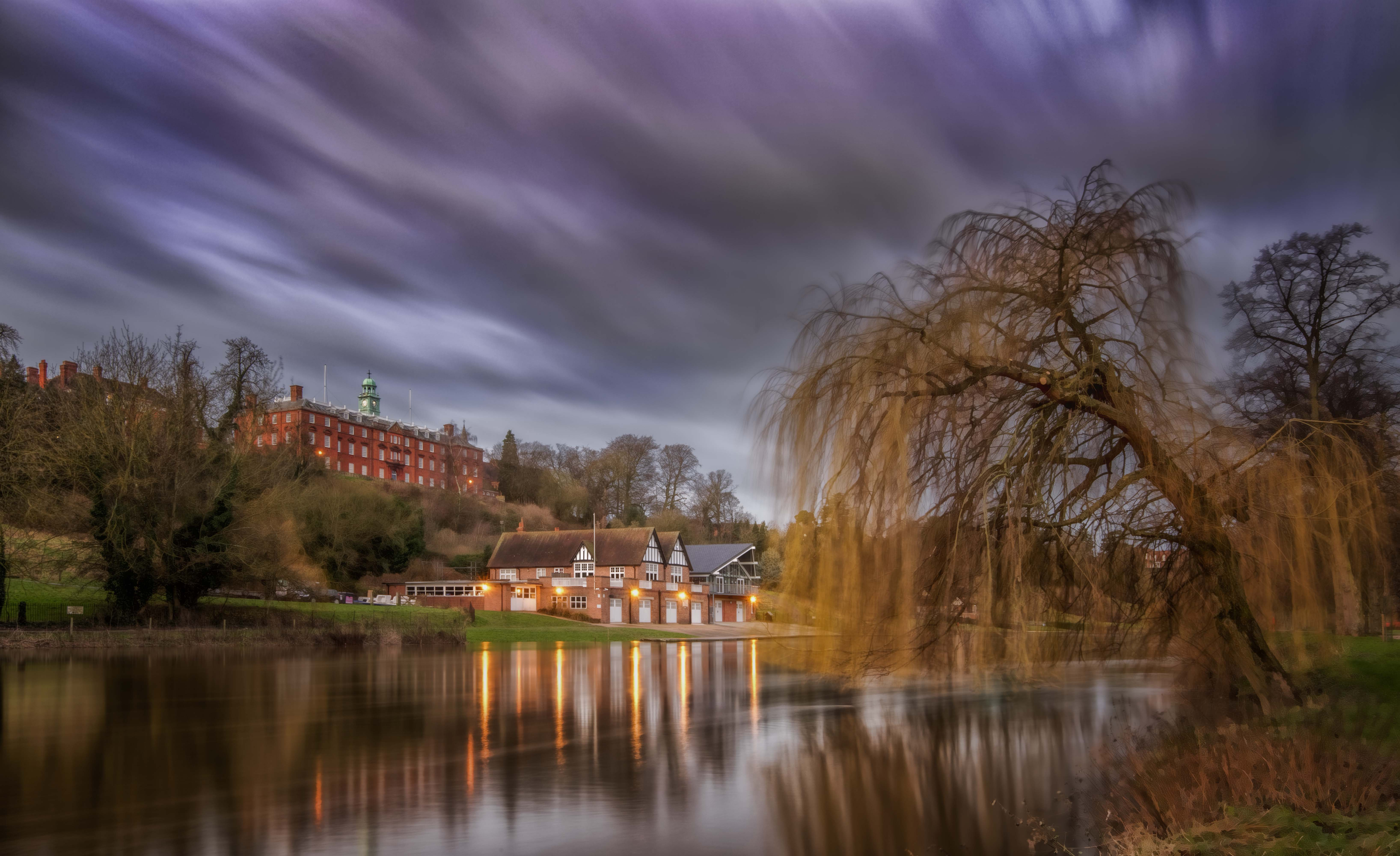

- Location: Shrewsbury School Boathouse, Kingsland, Shrewsbury, Shropshire, West Midlands, England
- Coordinates: 52.704355°N 2.760414°W
- Founded: 1866
- Affiliations: British Rowing boat code - SHR
- Website: www.shrewsbury.org.uk/page/rowing-rssbc

Royal Shrewsbury School Boat Club (RSSBC) is a rowing club based on the River Severn at Shrewsbury School Boathouse, Kingsland, Shrewsbury, Shropshire, West Midlands, England.

== History ==
The Royal Shrewsbury School Boat Club (RSSBC) is one of the oldest school rowing clubs, having begun as an unofficial sport frowned upon by the authorities, in the late 18th or early 19th century and the first official event being known to have happened in 1839, complete with military bands. The boat club was finally officially constituted in 1866.

The club has won the prestigious Princess Elizabeth Challenge Cup at the Henley Royal Regatta on four occasions and has won both the Queen Mother Challenge Cup at the National Schools' Regatta (three times) and the Schools' Head of the River Race eights (four times).

In 1982 the club was the first to be undefeated in Schools rowing in a single season, winning The Schools' Head of The River, Queen Mother Challenge Cup at National Schools' Regatta and Henley Royal Regatta. They won the Special Race For Schools at Henley Royal Regatta but had defeated Eton College, the winners of the Princess Elizabeth Challenge Cup at Henley Royal Regatta in all of their races that year.

== Pengwern Rowing Club ==
The Pengwern Boat Club shares the same stretch of the river and is located immediately to the west of the RSSBC.

== Honours ==
=== National Schools' Regatta ===
Year	Winning crew
1976	Queen Mother Challenge Cup
1982	Queen Mother Challenge Cup
2006	Queen Mother Challenge Cup

=== Henley Royal Regatta ===
Year	Winning crew
1924	Ladies' Challenge Plate
1932	Ladies' Challenge Plate
1955	Princess Elizabeth Challenge Cup
1960	Princess Elizabeth Challenge Cup
1961	Princess Elizabeth Challenge Cup
1976	Special Race for Schools
1980	Special Race for Schools
1981	Special Race for Schools
1982	Special Race for Schools
1984	Special Race for Schools
1985	Special Race for Schools
2007	Princess Elizabeth Challenge Cup

=== Schools' Head of the River Race ===
Year	Winning crew
1980	Eights
1982	Eights
2006	Eights
2007	Eights
2008	Eights

=== British champions ===
Year	Winning crew/s
1973	Men J18 2x, Men J16 8+
1977	Men J18 8+
1978	Men J18 8+
1979	Men J16 2x, Men J16 8+
1980	Men J18 2-
1981	Men J18 4+
1985	Men J18 8+
1986	Men J18 2+
1987	Men J18 2+, Men J16 2-
1989	Men J16 4-
1997	Men J18 2-, Men J18 4-
2009	Open J18 4+
2010	Open J18 4-, Open J18 4+
