= Kristen Thorsness =

American rower (born 1960)

Personal information
- Born: March 10, 1960 (age 66) Anchorage, Alaska, U.S.
Medal record
Women's rowing
Representing the United States
Olympic Games
Gold medal – first place	1984 Los Angeles	Women's eight
World Rowing Championships
Silver medal – second place	1987 Copenhagen	Women's eight
Silver medal – second place	1983 Duisburg	Women’s eight
Silver medal – second place	1982 Lucerne	Women’s eight

Kristen J. Thorsness (born March 10, 1960) is an American rower and Olympic gold medalist who competed on the U.S. National Team between 1982 and 1988. An attorney with Bond, Schoeneck and King in Rochester, N.Y., she specializes in Title IX in athletics. Thorsness is also a member of the Court of Arbitration for Sport (CAS), based in Lausanne, Switzerland, and serves as an arbitrator for the United States Olympic and Paralympic Committee. As a member of the CAS Ad Hoc Division at the 2024 Paris Olympics, she participated in cases brought before the court as both a panel member and Sole Arbitrator.

Thorsness was born in Anchorage, Alaska and is the first Alaskan, male or female, to have won an Olympic medal. She began her rowing career at the University of Wisconsin, winning one national championship and two silver medals. She was named Big Ten Conference Rower of the Decade and was runner up for Big Ten Conference Female Athlete of the Decade. After graduation, Thorsness joined the U.S. National Team, where she won silver medals at World Championships in 1982, 1983, and 1987, and a gold medal at the 1984 Olympic Games, the first U.S. women’s crew to win Olympic gold.

Together with her 1984 teammates, Thorsness was inducted into the U.S. Rowing Hall of Fame in 1984. She was a member of the inaugural class of inductees into the Alaska Sports Hall of Fame in 2007, and was inducted into the University of Wisconsin Athletics Hall of Fame in 2018. Thorsness has served on the U.S. Rowing Board of Directors, has been a U.S. Rowing referee since 2003, and served on U.S. Rowing's Referee Committee. In 2025, U.S. Rowing announced Thorsness’ selection for the Jack Kelly award, given for superior achievements in rowing, service to amateur athletics, and success in her chosen profession. She holds degrees from Boston University (J.D.), the Maxwell School of Citizenship and Public Affairs at Syracuse University (M.A.), and the University of Wisconsin (B.A.).
