= Aneta Mihaly =

Romanian rower (born 1957)

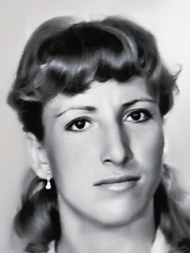

Personal information
- Born: 23 September 1957 (age 68) Axintele, Romania
- Height: 178 cm (5 ft 10 in)
- Weight: 77 kg (170 lb)

Sport
- Sport: Rowing
- Club: CS Dinamo București
Medal record
Representing Romania
Olympic Games
Silver medal – second place	1984 Los Angeles	Eight
World Championships
Silver medal – second place	1977 Amsterdam	Quadruple sculls
Bronze medal – third place	1979 Bled	Quadruple sculls
Bronze medal – third place	1981 Munich	Quadruple sculls

Aneta Mihaly (later Marin; born 23 September 1957) is a retired Romanian rower. She mostly competed in quadruple sculls, winning three medals at the world championships in 1977–1981 and placing fourth at the 1980 Olympics. At the 1984 Olympics she competed in eights and won a silver medal.
