= Harriet Metcalf =

American rower

Medal record

Women's rowing

Representing the United States

Olympic Games
Gold medal – first place	1984 Los Angeles	Eight

World Championships
Silver medal – second place	1987 Copenhagen	Eight

Harriet Morris "Holly" Metcalf (born March 25, 1958) is a six-time USA national/ Olympic team member in women's rowing, who won a gold medal in rowing at the 1984 Summer Olympics for the women's eight.

== Background ==
Metcalf received her B.A. in Music and English from Mount Holyoke College in 1981 and a masters in risk and prevention, along with a certificate of advanced study in human development and psychology from Harvard University.

== Career ==
Between 1981 and 1987, she won three silver and one bronze World Championship medals. She won an Olympic gold medal in the U.S. women's eight in 1984.

Metcalf has founded multiple nonprofit organizations to encourage more women and girls to participate in the sport of rowing. In 1994, she founded the Row As One Institute to serve masters women rowers. While director of Row As One, she founded G-ROW Boston, a rowing program for girls in the Boston public schools. G-ROW, which also incorporates academics and relationship-building, is now a program of Community Rowing, Inc. In 2002, she established WeCanRow (Women Enduring Cancer Row), a program for female breast cancer survivors which now operates around the U.S.

She was a panelist at the 2003 National Gay and Lesbian Athletics Conference in Cambridge, Massachusetts, on a panel of LGBT Olympians that also included swimmer Mark Tewksbury and high jumper Brian Marshall. In 2007, Metcalf was hired as head coach for the MIT women's openweight crew.

In 2024, she received the USRowing Medal of Honor, the highest honor bestowed by the organization, in recognition of her lifetime of service to the sport. She has also been elected into the Athletics Hall of Fame at her alma mater, Mount Holyoke College, as well as the Maine Hall of Fame and the New England Women's Sports Hall of Fame. She was selected as the joint USRowing Woman of the Year in 1999 and 2008, and was the recipient of the 2004 RYKÄ First Women of Fitness Award, the 1999 New England Women's Leadership Award, and was the 1998 Girl Scouts of America Leading Woman.

== Private life ==
Metcalf is openly lesbian. Holly now works as a coach for MIT rowing.
