= Kim Young-hee (rower) =

South Korean rower

Personal information
- Nationality: South Korean
- Born: 5 July 1962 (age 62)

Sport
- Sport: Rowing

Kim Young-hee (Korean: 김영희; RR: Gim Yeonghui; 5 July 1962) is a South Korean rower. She competed in the women's coxed four event at the 1984 Summer Olympics.
