= Margot Foster =

Australian rower (born 1958)

Medal record

Women's rowing

Representing Australia

Olympic Games
Bronze medal – third place	1984 Los Angeles	Coxed four

Commonwealth Games
Gold medal – first place	1986 Edinburgh	Eights

Margot Elizabeth Foster AM (born 3 October 1958) is an Australian Olympic rowing medallist and lawyer.

== Personal ==
Foster attended Presbyterian Ladies' College Melbourne. Foster completed a Bachelor of Law/Arts at the University of Melbourne in 1980 and a Masters of Business Administration at Monash University in 1994.

Foster's father John competed for Australia in water polo at the 1952 and 1956 Summer Olympics, and her brother Peter won the bronze medal in the K-2 1000 m kayaking event at the 1988 Summer Olympics in Seoul.

In 2015, she was awarded an Member of the Order of Australia (AM) for "significant service to sports administration and governance at the state and national level, as an elite athlete, and through support for women in sport'".

== Rowing ==
Foster's rowing career started in 1978 with Trinity College, University of Melbourne. In 1980, she was selected in the University of Melbourne's Women’s Eight to compete at the national championship. She stroked the Women's Coxed Four to a bronze medal at the 1984 Summer Olympics. It was Australia's first Olympic medal in women's rowing. At the 1986 Commonwealth Games, she stroked the Women's Eight to the gold medal. At the World Rowing Championships, in 1985 she stroked the Women's Pair to eighth and in 1986 the Women's Pair finished tenth. In 1988, she retired from international rowing after the Australian Olympic Federation decided not to select any women rowers for the 1988 Summer Olympics.

From 1989 to 1991, Foster was Secretary General of Australian Rowing Council. In 2010, she was admitted to the Rowing Victoria Hall of Fame.

== Lawyer and administrator ==
Foster has been appointed to numerous boards due to her sport and legal background. These include: Australian Sports Commission, Sport and Recreation New Zealand, Rowing Victoria, Australian & New Zealand Sports Law Association, Melbourne University Ladies' Rowing Club, University of Melbourne Sport & Physical Recreation Committee, University's of Melbourne's Blues Board, Australian University Sport, FISA Masters Commission, Womensport Australia, Melbourne & Olympic Parks Trust, Gymnastics Australia, Vicsport, Australian Bobsleigh & Skeleton Association, Motorsport Australia, Equestrian Australia and the Sports Environment Alliance.

In 2021, she was appointed a member of Sport Integrity Australia Advisory Council. She is as member of the Selection Advisory Committee for National Sports Tribunal.

Olympic positions include: Director of the 1996 Melbourne Olympic Bid Committee, inaugural Deputy Chair of Australian Olympic Committee (AOC) Athletes' Commission, Member of the AOC's Education Commission and Member and former President of the Olympians Club of Victoria.
