= Kim Myeong-jae =

South Korean rower

Personal information
- Nationality: South Korean
- Born: 15 October 1962 (age 62)

Sport
- Sport: Rowing

Kim Myeong-jae (born 15 October 1962) is a South Korean rower. She competed in the women's coxed four event at the 1984 Summer Olympics.
