= Broxbourne Rowing Club =

Rowing club in Hertfordshire, England formed in 1847

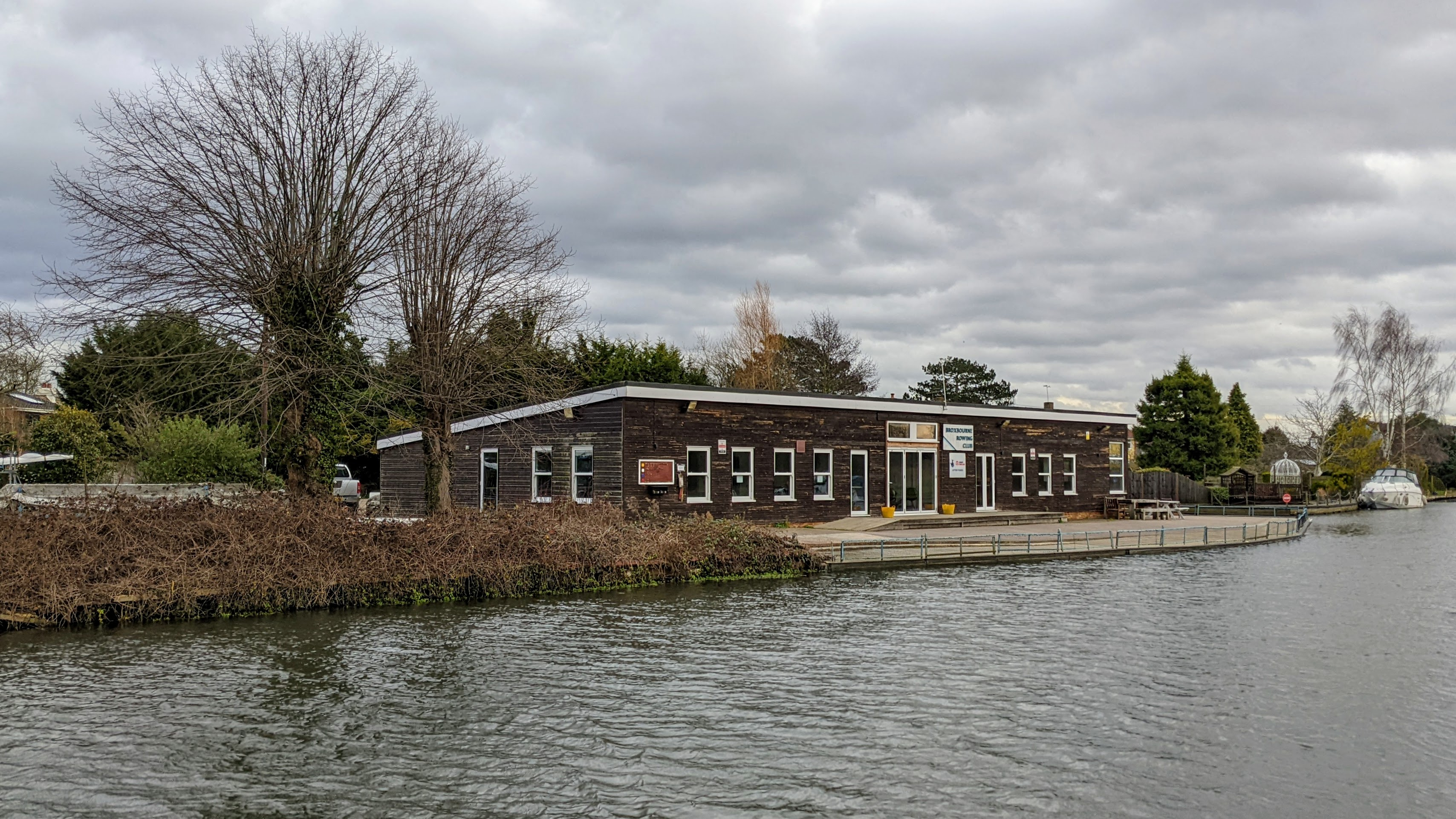

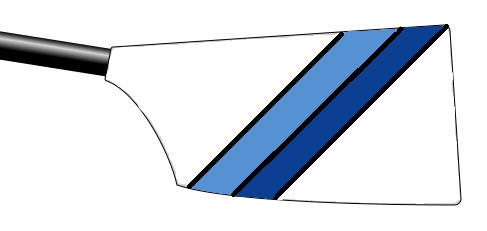
- Location: Old Nazeing Road, Broxbourne, Hertfordshire, England
- Coordinates: 51.740813°N 0.013240°W
- Affiliations: British Rowing (boat code BRX)
- Website: broxbournerowingclub.org

Broxbourne Rowing Club is a rowing club on the River Lea, based at Old Nazeing Road, Broxbourne, Hertfordshire, England. The club is affiliated to British Rowing and the facilities include a gymnasium, club house and bar and run squads for senior rowers, masters and juniors in addition to beginners and recreational rowers. The club has very active junior, senior and masters squads.

== History ==
Formed in 1847 Broxbourne rowing club is one of the oldest rowing clubs in the country. It held its first regatta in 1867.

In 1997, to celebrate its 150th anniversarty, Steve Redgrave planted a tree.

In 2007, Di Ellis opened the new boathouse and in 2011 Tom Aggar a new clubhouse.

== Honours ==
=== British champions ===
Year	Winning crew/s
1980	Women J18 1x
1995	Men J16 2-
2012	Women J18 2-

== Notable rowers ==
- Katie Ball
- Andy Kelly
- Rowan McKellar
- Anthony Stokes
