= Emerson Etem =

American ice hockey player (born 1992)

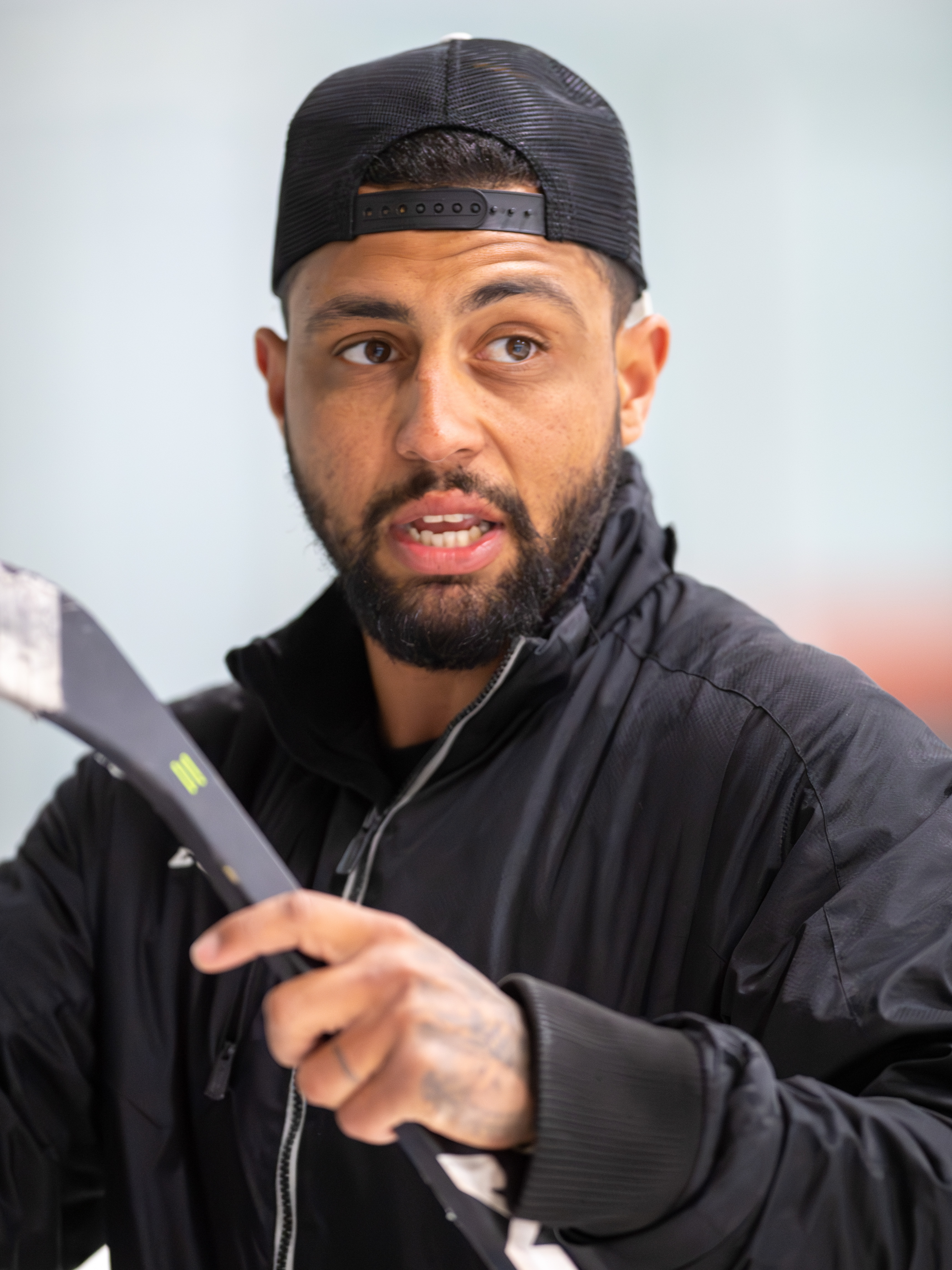
- Etem in 2023
- Born: June 16, 1992 (age 34) Long Beach, California, U.S.
- Height: 6 ft 1 in (185 cm)
- Weight: 210 lb (95 kg; 15 st 0 lb)
- Position: Right wing
- Shot: Left
- Played for: Anaheim Ducks; New York Rangers; Vancouver Canucks; HC Lugano
- NHL draft: 29th overall, 2010; Anaheim Ducks
- Playing career: 2012–2020

Emerson Albert Spratlen Etem (born June 16, 1992) is an American former professional ice hockey right winger and current Color Analyst for the Anaheim Ducks radio broadcast. He is also a co-owner of the Long Beach Shredders of the USPHL. He was originally selected in the first round, 29th overall, by the Anaheim Ducks in the 2010 NHL entry draft. He has also played for the New York Rangers and Vancouver Canucks. He retired in 2020 and became the head coach and general manager of the Missoula Jr. Bruins in the North American 3 Hockey League. In 2021, he purchased a junior team and became the head coach of the Long Beach Shredders in the United States Premier Hockey League.

== Early life and family ==
Etem comes from a family where rowing is very popular, and his African-American mother Patricia made the U.S. Olympic rowing team, though due to the 1980 Summer Olympics boycott, did not participate at the 1980 Games in Moscow. Continuing with his family's rowing tradition, Emerson's elder brother Martin rowed four years for Syracuse University where he was team captain his senior year. After graduation, he became an elite rower who trained to compete for the US National Rowing Team, and he placed third in the men's double in the Olympic trials prior to the London Olympic Games. Emerson has an older sister, Elise, who also has had a successful athletic career. She was nationally ranked in the butterfly from age 10 and was Wilson High School's Most Valuable Swimmer her senior year. She swam for one season at University of California, Berkeley and then walked on to the women's rowing team at the university, ultimately becoming captain of the Pac-12 champion team her senior year.

Etem and his wife, Danette, had a son together in 2016.

== Playing career ==
=== Junior ===
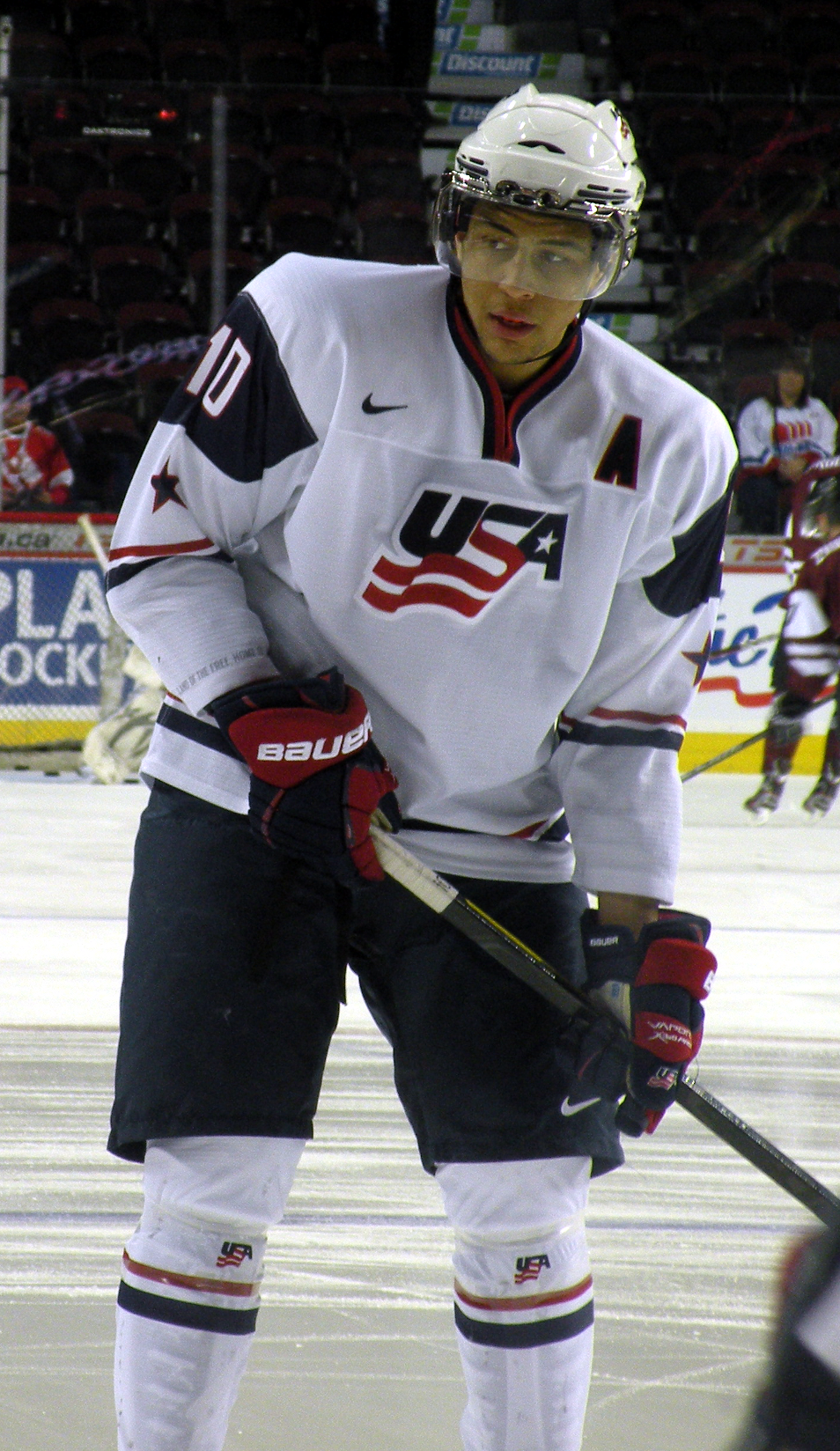
Etem at the 2012 World Junior Ice Hockey Championships

As a youth, Etem played in the 2004 and 2005 Quebec International Pee-Wee Hockey Tournament with a minor ice hockey team from Los Angeles.

Etem followed his older brother Martin into roller then ice hockey. While watching Martin play with the Long Beach Jr. Ice Dogs in the 2003 National Tier II Championship tournament, he saw Sidney Crosby lead the Shattuck-Saint Mary's Sabres to the Tier I 17 under National Championship (held concurrently at The Gardens Ice House in Laurel, Maryland). Inspired by the caliber of players, coaching and winning tradition of Sabres hockey, Etem moved to Faribault, Minnesota, at age 14 to play at Shattuck-Saint Mary's, where he led the Bantam team to a third-place finish at the Tier I 14 & under 2007 National Championship at Amherst, New York, in his freshman year. As the only sophomore on the Shattuck-Saint Mary's 2007–08 Midget Minor AAA team, Etem helped the Sabres win their second consecutive Tier I 17 & under National Title, the first time in the school's history.

In 2008–09, Etem then moved to Ann Arbor, Michigan, to play for USA Hockey's National Team Development Program (NTDP).

Etem was drafted into the Western Hockey League (WHL) 115th overall by the Medicine Hat Tigers in the 2007 Bantam Draft.

=== Professional ===
Despite reaching the eighth spot in the NHL Central Scouting Bureau's rankings ahead of the 2010 NHL entry draft, Etem's draft stock plummeted him down to the 29th overall pick by the Anaheim Ducks. He scored his first career NHL goal on March 18, 2013, against Antti Niemi of the San Jose Sharks.

On June 27, 2015, Etem, along with a second-round draft pick, was traded to the New York Rangers in exchange for Carl Hagelin and two draft picks in the 2015 NHL entry draft. After his first training camp with the Rangers, Etem made the opening night roster for the 2015–16 season. Used as the a depth forward, Etem was unable to cement a role and in 19 games provided 3 assists. On January 8, 2016, Etem was traded by the Rangers to the Vancouver Canucks in exchange for Nicklas Jensen and a 6th round pick in the 2017 draft. As a result, Etem was reunited with his former junior coach with Medicine Hat, Willie Desjardins. He scored his first goal as a Vancouver Canuck on February 6, 2016, against the Calgary Flames. In 39 games with the Canucks, he tallied 7 goals, 5 assists (12 points).

On June 27, 2016, Etem re-signed with the Canucks to a one-year contract worth $775,000. However, he did not make the opening roster for the 2016–17 season and was placed on waivers at the start of the season. Etem was picked up by the Anaheim Ducks off waivers on October 13, 2016, reuniting him with the organisation that drafted him. He played in 3 scoreless games in his return to Anaheim before he was reassigned to AHL affiliate, the San Diego Gulls. In his debut game with the Gulls Etem scored a goal, however suffered a knee injury which later required season ending surgery.

On June 26, 2017, Etem was not tendered a qualifying offer by the Ducks, releasing him as a free agent. On July 5, 2017, Etem agreed to a one-year, two-way contract with his fourth NHL club, the Arizona Coyotes. On January 2, 2018, the Coyotes announced that Etem's contract was terminated after he asked to be released from his contract.

On January 14, 2018, Etem signed with Lugano of the Swiss National League (NL) until the end of the 2017–18 season. He went scoreless in 5 regular season games for Lugano before making 1 post-season appearance.

As a free agent, Etem returned to North America in the summer, agreeing to a professional tryout to attend the Los Angeles Kings 2018 training camp on August 22, 2018. While impressing with the Kings, Etem was among the last cuts from the opening night roster. He accepted a reassignment to join AHL affiliate, the Ontario Reign, on a professional tryout contract on October 3, 2018. Etem failed to seize his opportunity with the Reign, posting 1 goal in 9 games before he was released from his tryout on November 3, 2018. He retired in 2020.

== Career statistics ==
=== Regular season and playoffs ===
			Regular season					Playoffs
Season	Team	League	GP	G	A	Pts	PIM	GP	G	A	Pts	PIM
2007–08	Shattuck-Saint Mary's	HS-Prep	58	13	15	28	20	—	—	—	—	—
2008–09	U.S. NTDP U17	USDP	13	6	7	13	0	—	—	—	—	—
2008–09	U.S. NTDP U18	USDP	4	2	0	2	2	—	—	—	—	—
2008–09	U.S. NTDP U18	NAHL	40	19	14	33	16	9	4	4	8	4
2009–10	Medicine Hat Tigers	WHL	72	37	28	65	26	12	7	3	10	0
2010–11	Medicine Hat Tigers	WHL	65	45	35	80	24	15	10	11	21	7
2011–12	Medicine Hat Tigers	WHL	65	61	46	107	34	7	7	6	13	13
2011–12	Syracuse Crunch	AHL	2	1	0	1	2	4	2	0	2	0
2012–13	Norfolk Admirals	AHL	45	13	3	16	12	—	—	—	—	—
2012–13	Anaheim Ducks	NHL	38	3	7	10	9	7	3	2	5	2
2013–14	Anaheim Ducks	NHL	29	7	4	11	4	4	0	0	0	12
2013–14	Norfolk Admirals	AHL	50	24	30	54	10	4	0	2	2	0
2014–15	Anaheim Ducks	NHL	45	5	5	10	4	12	3	0	3	0
2014–15	Norfolk Admirals	AHL	22	13	8	21	2	—	—	—	—	—
2015–16	New York Rangers	NHL	19	0	3	3	2	—	—	—	—	—
2015–16	Vancouver Canucks	NHL	39	7	5	12	9	—	—	—	—	—
2016–17	Anaheim Ducks	NHL	3	0	0	0	2	—	—	—	—	—
2016–17	San Diego Gulls	AHL	1	1	0	1	0	—	—	—	—	—
2017–18	Tucson Roadrunners	AHL	16	4	1	5	8	—	—	—	—	—
2017–18	HC Lugano	NL	5	0	0	0	0	1	0	0	0	0
2018–19	Ontario Reign	AHL	9	1	0	1	0	—	—	—	—	—
2019–20	Cabri Bulldogs	WMHL	11	14	33	47	0	2	3	10	13	0
AHL totals			145	57	42	99	34	8	2	2	4	0
NHL totals			173	22	24	46	30	23	6	2	8	14

=== International ===
Medal record

Men's ice hockey

Representing the United States

World Junior Championships
Bronze medal – third place	2011 United States	

Year	Team	Event	Result	GP	G	A	Pts	PIM
2009	United States	U17	3rd place, bronze medalist(s)	6	2	4	6	0
2011	United States	WJC	3rd place, bronze medalist(s)	6	1	0	1	0
2012	United States	WJC	7th	6	0	4	4	2
Junior totals				18	3	8	11	2

== Post-playing career ==
After retiring from playing, he became the head coach of the Missoula Jr. Bruins, a junior ice hockey team based in Missoula, Montana, and a member of the North American 3 Hockey League, for the 2020–21 season. The team was sold in 2021 and Etem and his wife Danette purchased their own junior team in the United States Premier Hockey League, relocating the Anaheim Avalanche to become the Long Beach Shredders in his hometown of Long Beach, California. Etem serves as part-owner, head coach, and general manager of the Shredders.

Etem was hired by the Anaheim Ducks on July 20, 2023 as the club's new radio color analyst and content producer for Ducks Stream on TuneIn.

Awards and achievements
Preceded by Cam Fowler	Anaheim Ducks first-round draft pick 2010	Succeeded by Rickard Rakell
