= Huang Meixia =

Chinese rower

Personal information
- Nationality: Chinese
- Born: 16 November 1958 (age 66)

Sport
- Sport: Rowing

Huang Meixia (born 16 November 1958) is a Chinese rower. She competed in the women's coxed four event at the 1984 Summer Olympics.
