= Shi Meiping =

Chinese rower

Personal information
- Nationality: Chinese
- Born: 28 October 1964 (age 60)

Sport
- Sport: Rowing

Shi Meiping (born 28 October 1964) is a Chinese rower. She competed in the women's coxed four event at the 1984 Summer Olympics.
