= Cathy Lund =

Canadian rower (born 1959)

Personal information
- Born: 23 March 1959 (age 66) London, Ontario, Canada

Sport
- Sport: Rowing

Cathy Lund (born 23 March 1959) is a Canadian rower. She competed in the women's eight event at the 1984 Summer Olympics.
