= Kim Jeong-nam (rower) =

South Korean rower

Personal information
- Nationality: South Korean
- Born: 9 May 1963 (age 61)

Sport
- Sport: Rowing

Kim Jeong-nam (born 9 May 1963) is a South Korean rower. She competed in the women's coxed four event at the 1984 Summer Olympics.
