= Jan Harville =

American rower

Biographical details
- Born: February 19, 1952 (age 74); Seattle, Washington

Playing career

Collegiate rowing
- 1970–1973: Washington

Olympic rowing
- 1978–1984: U.S. national team

Coaching career (HC unless noted)

Collegiate rowing
- 1980–1987: Washington (women's) (asst.)
- 1987–2003: Washington (women's)

World Championships
- 1987–1999: United States

Accomplishments and honors

Championships
- NCAA champion (1997, 1998, 2001)

Awards
- AIAW silver medal-pairs (1972); 9x Pac-10 Coach of the Year; National rowing coach of the year (2002)

Janet Christine Harville (born February 19, 1952) is an American rower.

== College and later rowing ==
Harville rowed at the University of Washington from 1970 to 1973, winning an AIAW silver medal in pairs in 1972. She earned a degree in medical technology in 1974.

She was a member of the United States national team from 1978 to 1984 and competed at the World Championships in 1978–1979 and 1982–1983. Harville was also a member of the 1980 US Olympic Team. She competed in the women's coxed four event at the 1984 Summer Olympics.

== Coaching ==
Harville became an assistant coach at Washington in 1980, then became head coach in 1988. She led the Huskies through the 2003 season, winning NCAA titles in 1997, 1998, and 2001. A nine-time Pac-10 Coach of the Year, Harville was also national rowing coach of the year in 2002. Harville coached U.S. teams at the World Championships from 1987 to 1999.
