= Zhang Liming =

Chinese rowing cox

Personal information
- Nationality: Chinese
- Born: 27 November 1957 (age 67)

Sport
- Sport: Rowing

Zhang Liming (born 27 November 1957) is a Chinese rowing coxswain. She competed in the women's coxed four event at the 1984 Summer Olympics.
