= Karen Brancourt =

Australian rower

Medal record

Women's rowing

Representing Australia

Olympic Games
Bronze medal – third place	1984 Los Angeles	Coxed four

Karen Brancourt (born 15 March 1962) is an Australian former national representative and Olympic medal winning rower.

== Career ==
Brancourt's senior rowing was done with the Torrens Rowing Club in South Australia. She won a bronze medal in the coxed four at the 1984 Summer Olympics, rowing in the two seat. It was Australia's first Olympic medal in women's rowing.
