= Kristine Norelius =

American rower (born 1956)

Personal information
- Full name: Kristine Lee Norelius
- Born: December 26, 1956 (age 69) Seattle, Washington, U.S.
Medal record
Women's rowing
Representing the United States
Olympic Games
Gold medal – first place	1984 Los Angeles	Women's eight

Kristine Lee Norelius (born December 26, 1956) is an American former competitive rower and Olympic gold medalist.

== Olympian ==
Norelius qualified for the 1980 U.S. Olympic team, but was unable to compete due to the 1980 Summer Olympics boycott. She did, however, receive one of 461 Congressional Gold Medals created especially for the spurned athletes. Four years later, she was a member of the American women's eights team that won the gold medal at the 1984 Summer Olympics in Los Angeles, California.

== Family ==
Kristine Norelius is the sister of Mark Norelius, who was also a rower and competed at the 1976 Summer Olympics. She is married to Brian Faller and has two children.
