= Rowing Victoria =

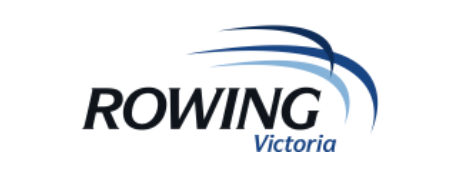
- Sport: Rowing
- Jurisdiction: Australia
- Abbreviation: RV
- Founded: 1876
- Affiliation: Rowing Australia
- Headquarters: Lakeside Stadium, Melbourne, Victoria
- President: Joeseph Joyce

Official website
- www.rowingvictoria.asn.au

Rowing Victoria (RV) is the governing body for the sport of rowing in Victoria, Australia.

== History ==
Rowing Victoria, formerly Victorian Rowing Association, formed on 7 October 1876. The Victorian Ladies' Rowing Association was formed on 31 January 1924. In 1979 the men's and women's associations merged.

== Life Members ==
=== Current Life Members ===
Peter Antonie, Kath Bennett, Peter Fraser, Andrew Guerin, Caroline Judd, James Lowe, Mike McKay, David Pincus, James Tomkins, Eric Waller, Roger Wilson.

=== Past Life Members ===
Robert Aitken, David Boykett, Bill Bradshaw, Norman Cairnes, Jim Hardie, Harvey Nicholson, Brian Vear, Noel Wilkinson, Hubert Frederico, David Deeble, Bill Waterfield, Ray Todd, Jess Stockman, May Laird, Jess Pinkerton, Bob Morell, Ted Woolcock.
