= Susan Lee (rowing) =

Australian rowing cox

Medal record

Women's rowing

Representing Australia

Olympic Games
Bronze medal – third place	1984 Los Angeles	Coxed four

Susan Brosnan (née Lee; born 7 June 1966) is an Australian Olympic medal winning rower, an agricultural businesswoman, and the spouse of the current Administrator of the Northern Territory, David Connolly.

Lee grew up in Castlemaine, Victoria. She became interested in rowing at school in Melbourne and was selected as coxswain for the Australian women's four at the 1984 Summer Olympics. This team won a bronze medal at these Games, which was Australia's first Olympic medal in women's rowing.

She studied accounting at university and developed an interest in pastoral industries and moved first to rural Queensland before settling in the Northern Territory, where she has lived for the past 29 years. With her husband, Brosnan was appointed to oversee the planning and construction of the Northern Territory's first commercial cotton gin. The facility was completed in 2023 and conducted its inaugural ginning season in 2024.
