= Patricia Spratlen =

American rower

Patricia Maria Spratlen-Etem (born March 14, 1956, in Columbus, Ohio) is an American former competitive rower. She rowed at the University of California, Berkeley.

== Early rowing career ==
Spratlen-Etem began her rowing career when she joined the team at UC Berkeley. She excelled and qualified for the Olympic Games twice. In 1977 she became the stroke of the varsity eight and was a vital part winning titles at the Bay Area Rowing Festival, the Western Collegiate, the NWRA Regional, and Pacific Coast Championships.

She took home a gold medal in Switzerland at the Lucerne International Regatta and in the 1979, 1981, and 1983 World Rowing Championships, she took home a bronze and two silver medals.

Etem, a member of the class of 1979, was inducted into the California Athletics Hall of Fame in 1990.

== Olympian ==
Spratlen-Etem qualified for the 1980 U.S. Olympic team but was unable to compete due to the 1980 Summer Olympics boycott. In 2007, she received one of 461 Congressional Gold Medals created especially for the spurned athletes. She was a member of the American women's coxed fours team that finished fourth at the 1984 Summer Olympics in Los Angeles. She is the second Black woman to compete for the US Olympic Rowing team, after Anita DeFrantz.

== Personal ==
Spratlen-Etem has three children, Martin, Elise, and Emerson. Martin became the first African-American on the US Rowing Under-23 National Team in 2008. Elise was initially recruited as a swimmer for UC Berkeley, and later switched to rowing. She eventually received a PAC-12 Athlete of the Year award, as well as earning CRCA All-American honors in her senior year. Her son, Emerson Etem, is a professional ice hockey player.

Spratlen-Etem has a master's degree in public health and behavioral sciences from the University of California, Berkeley.
