= Ann Redgrave =

British rower and physician (born 1960)

Personal information
- Born: Elizabeth-Ann Callaway; February 8, 1960 (age 66)
- Education: Charing Cross Hospital Medical School
- Occupation(s): Sports physician, osteopath
- Spouse: Sir Steve Redgrave

Sport
- Country: Great Britain
- Sport: Rowing
Medal record
Rowing
Representing England
Commonwealth Games
Silver medal – second place	1986 Edinburgh	Eight
Bronze medal – third place	1986 Edinburgh	Coxed Four

Ann, Lady Redgrave (née Elizabeth-Ann Callaway; born 8 March 1960) is a British surgeon and osteopath and former rower.

== Rowing career ==
Having taken up the sport in 1981, Redgrave rowed in the women's eight at the 1984 Los Angeles Olympics. The team which consisted of Astrid Ayling, Alexa Forbes, Gillian Hodges, Kate Holroyd, Belinda Holmes, Sarah Hunter-Jones, Kate McNicol and Sue Bailey (cox) finished in fifth place. She was part of the coxed four with Alison Bonner, Sarah Hunter-Jones, Tish Reid, and Lesley Clare (cox), that won the national title rowing for A.R.A squad, at the 1985 National Championships and represented England and won a silver medal in the eight and a bronze medal in the four, at the 1986 Commonwealth Games in Edinburgh, Scotland.

She was Chief Medical Officer to GB Rowing between 1992 and 2001 in a part-time capacity. She became GB Rowing's first full-time Medical Officer in 2009. She was elected a Steward of Henley Royal Regatta in 2016.

== Medical career ==
Redgrave qualified as a doctor from Charing Cross Hospital Medical School, London in 1984 and entered a career in orthopaedic surgery, with an interest in sports medicine. However, because of her international rowing commitments, she took a sabbatical in 1988 for the Seoul Olympic Games. During her sabbatical, she developed an interest in osteopathy and thus trained at the British School of Osteopathy following her year out, qualifying in 1990. In late 1990, she established The Redgrave Clinic in Bourne End, which has since begun to offer a range of other treatments from physiotherapy to the Alexander Technique.

== Personal life ==
Steven and Ann Redgrave have three children: Natalie, Sophie and Zac. Natalie rowed with the Oxford University Women's Boat Club which won the women's boat race at Henley Boat Races in 2011.

== Awards ==
Redgrave has three Honorary Degrees, from Loughborough University in 2001, from the University of Staffordshire in 2004, and from Exeter University in 2010. Upon her retirement as Chief Medical Officer of GB Rowing in 2001, she was awarded the British Rowing Medal of Honour.

== Styles ==
- Miss Ann Callaway (1960–1984)
- Dr Ann Callaway (1984–1988)
- Dr Ann Redgrave (1988–2001)
- The Honourable Lady Redgrave (2001–)
