= Robyn Grey-Gardner =

Australian rower (born 1964)

Personal information
- Born: 6 September 1964 (age 61) Adelaide, South Australia
- Education: University of Adelaide; Australian National University

Sport
- Club: Adelaide Uni Boat Club; Torrens Rowing Club; Mosman Rowing Club; Australian Institute of Sport
Medal record
Women's rowing
Representing Australia
Olympic Games
Bronze medal – third place	1984 Los Angeles	Coxed four
Commonwealth Games
Gold medal – first place	1986 Edinburgh	Eight
Silver medal – second place	1986 Edinburgh	Coxed four

Robyn Grey-Gardner (born 6 September 1964) is an Australian former eight-time national champion, national representative, Olympic and Commonwealth Games medal winning rower. She won Australian championships in all three sweep-oared women's rowing events - the coxless pair, the coxless four and in the eight.

== Club and state rowing ==
Grey-Gardner's senior rowing was from the Adelaide University Boat Club and the Torrens Rowing Club in South Australia, and later Mosman Rowing Club in Sydney. From 1982 she rowed in South Australian representative senior women's coxless fours contesting the ULVA Trophy at the Interstate Regatta within the Australian Rowing Championships. She competed in that event from 1982 to 1984 and in 1988.

She contested national championship titles at the Australian Rowing Championships on numerous occasions. In Adelaide University colours she competed in the women's coxless four in 1982 and 1983 and in the women's eight championship in 1982. In 1984 she raced in Australian selection trial crews and wearing Torrens Rowing Club colours she won national championships in the Australian women's coxless pair and the eight and competed in the coxless four .

In 1985 Grey-Gardner was living in Sydney and rowing for Mosman Rowing Club when she contested the coxless pair and coxless four at the national championships that year in Australian selection combinations. In 1985 rowing was first included as an AIS scholarship sport and in 1986 Grey-Gardner earned a scholarship to the AIS and that year she won further Australian Championship titles - the coxless pair and at stroke in the women' eight - both raced as all-AIS crews. From 1986 to 1988 she contested all three sweep-oared national championship events each, she won the pair and the coxless four in 1987 and won in the four and eight (at stroke) in 1988.

== International representative rowing ==
Grey-Gardner was selected in the bow seat of the Australian representative women's coxless four for the 1984 Los Angeles Olympics. That crew brought home a bronze medal - Australia's first Olympic medal in women's rowing.

Australia sent women's crews to the 1986 Commonwealth Games and Grey-Gardner raced in the four to a silver medal and in the six seat of the women's eight who won gold. A month later at the 1986 World Rowing Championships in Nottingham, Grey-Gardner stroked the Australian coxless four who finished in seventh place overall.

== Professional career ==
Grey-Gardner is an environmental scientist who works to improve access to and the safety of drinking water in remote regional locations. She has worked with Aboriginal and Torres Strait Islander peoples across Australia implementing risk management approaches and consulting to government and service providers. In 2017 she was the lead author of the World Health Organization's Guidelines for Drinking Water Quality: Small Water Supplies Field Guide and has written Australia's field guide for the risk management of small water supplies in remote communities.
