= Abby Peck =

American rower

Personal information
- Full name: Abigail Knickerbocker Peck
- Born: October 6, 1956 (age 70) Scranton, Pennsylvania, United States

Sport
- Sport: Rowing

Abigail Knickerbocker Peck (born October 6, 1956) is an American rower. She competed at the 1984 Summer Olympics and the 1988 Summer Olympics.

== Early life and education ==
Abby Peck was born Abigail Knickerbocker Peck and is the daughter of James and Rosamond Peck.

She graduated from Skidmore College with a degree in art in 1978. Following her athletic career, she earned a master's degree in exercise and sports science from Smith College.

== Rowing career ==
Peck began rowing during her college years and subsequently became a member of the US National Team, serving from 1980 through 1988. She represented the United States at two Olympic Games: competing in the quad sculls at the 1984 Los Angeles Games and in the eight at the 1988 Seoul Games.

Throughout her international career, Peck competed in five World Championships between 1982 and 1987, winning a silver medal in the eight in 1987. She also earned silver medals in both the quad sculls and the eights at the 1986 Goodwill Games. Nationally, she won twelve gold medals, three silver medals, and one bronze medal at the United States national championships.

== Post-rowing career and PAISBC ==
Following a back injury, Peck transitioned into teaching and sports science. She began working with breast cancer survivors, teaching them the mechanics of rowing and organizing teams to participate in the Head of the Charles Regatta in Cambridge.

In 2010, she founded PAISBC (Physical Activity Intervention Surviving Beyond Cancer), a non-profit organization located in Waverly, Pennsylvania. Through this initiative, she works with oncology patients at the Northeast Radiation Oncology Center. Peck has emphasized that the personal growth and "the journey" of her rowing career were more significant than the medals she achieved.
