= Marilyn Brain =

Canadian rower

Personal information
- Born: April 14, 1959 (age 67) Halifax, Nova Scotia, Canada
Medal record
Women's Rowing
Representing Canada
Olympic Games
| Silver medal – second place | 1984 Los Angeles | Coxed Fours |

Marilyn Brain (born April 14, 1959, in Halifax, Nova Scotia) is a Canadian rower.

She won a silver medal in the Coxed Fours event at the 1984 Summer Olympics. Marilyn represented Canada for six years at the international level competing in five World Championships, 5 Lucerne International Regattas and one Olympic Games. She was a member of the University of Victoria's Women's Eight crew named Team of the Year for the city of Victoria, B.C. in 1981 and named female athlete of the Year for the city of Victoria in 1984. Ranked (47th) in the top 100 Vancouver Island athletes for the 20th Century by the Times Colonist Newspaper. Marilyn married fellow rower Howard Campbell.
