= Angela Schneider =

Canadian rower

Personal information
- Born: October 28, 1959 (age 66) St. Thomas, Ontario, Canada
Medal record
Women's rowing
Representing Canada
Olympic Games
Silver medal – second place	1984 Los Angeles	Coxed Fours

Angela Schneider (born October 28, 1959) is a Canadian rower. She won a silver medal in the Coxed Fours event at the 1984 Summer Olympics. Schneider is currently a professor at the University of Western Ontario. She teaches a kinesiology course about ethics in sport.

Angela is the mother of Loughran (Locky) Butcher, who competed in hurdles and high jump for Western University. He also competed for Team Canada in the 2013 IAAF World Youth Championships, where he came 24th in the 110M hurdles.
