= Shyril O'Steen =

American rower (born 1960)

Personal information
- Born: October 5, 1960 (age 65) Seattle, Washington, U.S.
Medal record
Women's rowing
Representing the United States
Olympic Games
Gold medal – first place	1984 Los Angeles	Women's eight

Shyril O'Steen (born October 5, 1960) is an American former competitive rower and Olympic gold medalist. She was a member of the American women's eights team that won the gold medal at the 1984 Summer Olympics in Los Angeles, California.
