= Barbara Armbrust =

Canadian rower (born 1963)

Personal information
- Born: August 13, 1963 (age 62) St. Catharines, Ontario, Canada
Medal record
Women's rowing
Representing Canada
Olympic Games
Silver medal – second place	1984 Los Angeles	Coxed four
World Rowing Championships
Bronze medal – third place	1985 Hazewinkel	Coxed four

Barbara Armbrust (born August 13, 1963, in St. Catharines, Ontario) is a Canadian rower. She won a silver medal in the coxed four at the 1984 Summer Olympics.

A graduate of the University of Victoria, Barbara Armbrust began representing Canada in 1980, when she came in fourth as a member of an eight crew at the Junior World Championships. The following year, at the same tournament, she was fifth in the coxed four and seventh in the eight. She then moved up to the senior level and, in 1983, placed fourth in the coxed four at that year’s World Championships, alongside Gail Cort, Kathey Lichty, Jane Tregunno, and Lesley Thompson-Willie. She won silver in that event at the 1984 Summer Olympics, with Tregunno, Thompson-Willie, Marilyn Brain, and Angela Schneider, and bronze at the 1985 World Championships, alongside Thompson-Willie, Christine Clarke, Lisa Robertson, and Tricia Smith. After failing to reach the final of the quadruple sculls at the 1986 World Championships, with Brain, Silken Laumann, and Kay Worthington, Armbrust retired from active competition.
