= Carol Bower =

American rower (born 1956)

Personal information
- Born: June 9, 1956 (age 70) Riverside, California, U.S.
Medal record
Women's rowing
Representing the United States
Olympic Games
Gold medal – first place	1984 Los Angeles	Women's eight

Carol Ann Bower (born June 9, 1956) is a former American competitive rower and Olympic gold medalist. She was a member of the American women's eights team that won the gold medal at the 1984 Summer Olympics in Los Angeles, California. She retired from coaching the women's rowing team at Bryn Mawr College after their 2021–2022 season.
