= Jeanne Flanagan =

American rower (born 1957)

Personal information
- Full name: Jeanne Ann Flanagan
- Born: May 8, 1957 (age 69) New Haven, Connecticut, U.S.
Medal record
Women's rowing
Representing the United States
Olympic Games
| Gold medal – first place | 1984 Los Angeles | Women's eight |

Jeanne Ann Flanagan (born May 8, 1957) is an American former competitive rower and Olympic gold medalist.

== Olympic athlete ==
Flanagan competed at the 1979 World Rowing Championships as a member of the woman's coxed-eight crew and won a bronze medal. She qualified for the 1980 U.S. Olympic team but was unable to compete due to the U.S. Olympic Committee's boycott of the 1980 Summer Olympics in Moscow, Russia. She was one of 461 athletes to receive a Congressional Gold Medal instead. Four years later, she was a member of the American women's eights team that won the gold medal at the 1984 Summer Olympics in Los Angeles, California.

== Personal life ==
Flanagan attended The Morgan School in Clinton, Connecticut for High School and Florida Institute of Technology.
