= Lisa Robertson (rower) =

Canadian rower (born 1961)

Personal information
- Nationality: Canadian
- Born: October 13, 1961 (age 64) Victoria, British Columbia, Canada

Sport
- Sport: Rowing

Lisa Robertson (born October 13, 1961) is a Canadian rower. She competed in the women's eight event at the 1984 Summer Olympics.
