= Kathy Keeler =

American rower

Personal information
- Full name: Kathryn Elliott Keeler
- Born: November 3, 1956 (age 69) Galveston, Texas, U.S.
Medal record
Women's rowing
Representing the United States
Olympic Games
Gold medal – first place	1984 Los Angeles	Women's eight

Kathryn Elliott Keeler (born November 3, 1956) is an American former competitive rower and Olympic gold medalist. She was a member of the American women's eights team that won the gold medal at the 1984 Summer Olympics in Los Angeles, California, "the only women's crew in U.S. history to win an Olympic gold medal" until 2008.

== Education ==
Keeler is a 1978 graduate of Wesleyan University.

== Competition ==
Keeler was a member of the U.S. national rowing team in 1982 and the women's four that won a silver medal at the World Rowing Championships in Lucerne, Switzerland that year. Keeler qualified for the 1980 U.S. Olympic team but did not compete due to the U.S. Olympic Committee's boycott of the 1980 Summer Olympics in Moscow, Russia. She was one of 461 athletes to receive a Congressional Gold Medal many years later. Overall, she was a member of four U.S. national rowing teams.

== Coach ==
Subsequent to her competitive rowing career, Keeler was a member of the U.S. national rowing team as a coach on six occasions (in 1987, 89, 91, 93, 94, 95). As U.S. Olympic Team coach in 1996, she directed the U.S. women's lightweight double to a silver medal at the 1996 Olympics in Atlanta, Georgia. She also was a college coach at Smith College, among other institutions.

== Personal life ==
She was married to the late Harry Parker. They have a daughter, Abigail Parker, who rowed at Harvard University and Cambridge University. Kathy currently resides in Cambridge, Massachusetts.
