= Radley College Boat Club =

British rowing club

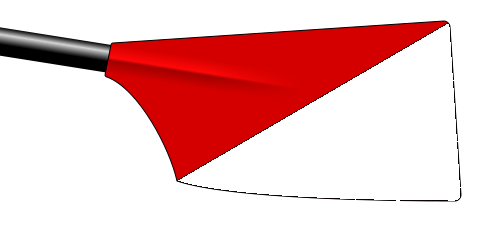

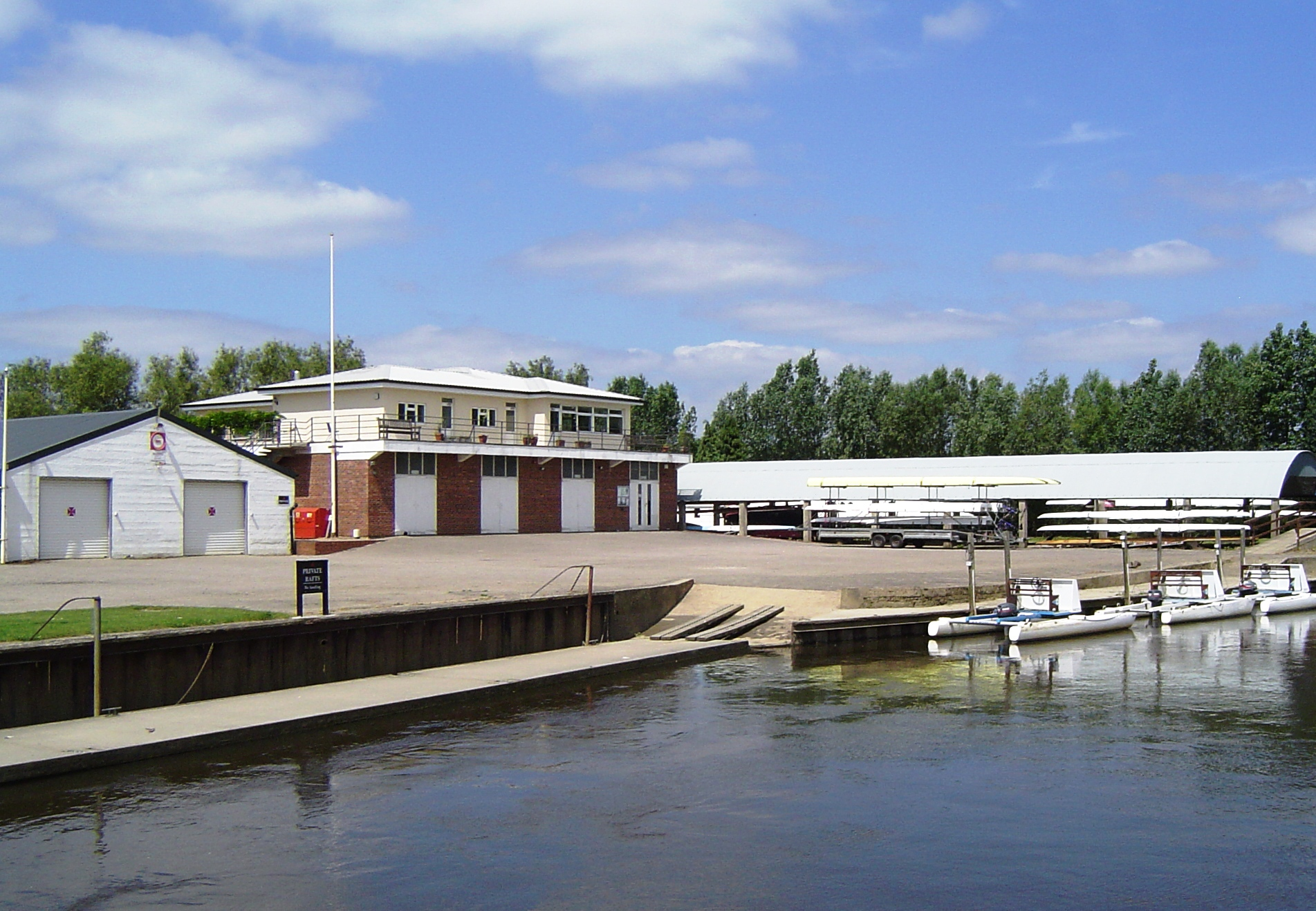
- Location: Lower Radley, Radley, Oxfordshire, England
- Coordinates: 51.685498°N 1.222389°W
- Founded: 1849
- Affiliations: British Rowing boat code - RAD
- Website: www.radley.org.uk/sport/rowing

Radley College Boat Club is a rowing club on the River Thames based in Lower Radley, Radley, Oxfordshire, England and is affiliated to British Rowing.

== History ==
The club was founded in 1849.

The club won the Princess Elizabeth Challenge Cup at the Henley Royal Regatta in 1952, 1962 and 1998.

== Honours ==
=== National champions ===
Year	Winning crew
1972	MJ2- MJ4-
1973	MJ2+, MJ16 2x
1974	MJ4- composite, MJ4x composite, MJ16 2+
1975	MJ16 8+
1978	MJ4x composite
1984	MJ16 4-

Key

- M men, +coxed, -coxless, x sculls, J junior, 16 under-16

=== National Schools' Regatta ===
Year	Winning crew
1975	Queen Mother Challenge Cup
1981	Queen Mother Challenge Cup
1997	Queen Mother Challenge Cup
2000	Queen Mother Challenge Cup
2001	Queen Mother Challenge Cup
2026	Queen Mother Challenge Cup

=== Henley Royal Regatta ===
Year	Winning crew
1938	Ladies' Challenge Plate
1952	Princess Elizabeth Challenge Cup
1962	Princess Elizabeth Challenge Cup
1987	Special Race for Schools
1988	Special Race for Schools
1998	Princess Elizabeth Challenge Cup

== See also ==
- Rowing on the River Thames
