= Jane Tregunno =

Canadian rower

- Tregunno in 2011

Personal information
- Full name: Elizabeth Jane Tregunno (Stamp)
- Nationality: Canada
- Born: July 9, 1962 (age 63) St. Catharines, Ontario, Canada
- Height: 1.85 m (6 ft 1 in)
- Weight: 68 kg (150 lb)

Sport
- Sport: Women's rowing
- Event: Coxed four
Medal record
Women's rowing
Representing Canada
Olympic Games
Silver medal – second place	1984 Los Angeles	Coxed fours
Commonwealth Games
Gold medal – first place	1986 Edinburgh	Coxed fours

Jane Tregunno (born July 9, 1962 in St. Catharines, Ontario) is a Canadian rower. She won a silver medal in the Coxed Fours event at the 1984 Summer Olympics. She also competed in the same event at the 1988 Summer Olympics, finishing in 7th place. She was selected as a member of the 1980 Summer Olympics however did not attend as a result of the 1980 Summer Olympics boycott. Jane was also a part of the winning crew in the coxed fours event at the 1986 Commonwealth Games.
