= 1973 British Rowing Championships =

- Venue: National Water Sports Centre
- Location: Holme Pierrepont (Nottingham)
- Dates: 21–22 July 1973

The 1973 National Rowing Championships was the second edition of the National Championships, held from 21–22 July 1973 at the National Water Sports Centre in Holme Pierrepont, Nottingham.

== Senior ==
=== Medal summary ===
Event	Gold	Silver	Bronze
Victor Ludorum	Leander	London University	Tideway Scullers School
Men 1x	Poplar Blackwall and District; Kenny Dwan	London; David Sturge	Leander; Glyn Locke
Men 2+	Kingston / Leander; Richard Ayling & Mark Hayter	Leander; Summers & John Pemberton	City Orient Curruthers & White
Men 2x	Cambridge University	Furnivall SC / Argosies	Durham
Men 2-	Leander / Thames Tradesmen's; John Yallop & Lenny Robertson	St Ives; Tony Cowley & Nigel Drake	Lady Margaret
Men 4-	London University	Tideway Scullers School	Leander / Wallingford / Oxford University
Men 4+	Leander / London University / Tideway Scullers School	Tideway Scullers School	London University
Men 8+	Quintin; Brian Fentiman, Robert Lee (cox)	London University	Leander
Women 1x	Mercia Scullers; Christine Peer		
Women 2x	Thames		
Women 4+	Civil Service Ladies; Maggie Lambourn, Clare Grove, Chris Grimes, Mary Mackay, Pat Sly (cox)		
Women 4x	Thames / Warwick		

== Junior ==
=== Medal summary ===
Event	Gold	Silver	Bronze
Men 1x	Westminster School		
Men 2-	Eton College		
Men 2x	Royal Shrewsbury School		
Men 2+	Radley College		
Men 4-	Eton College		
Men 4+	Wallingford Schools		
Men 8+	Eton College		
Men J16 1x	Maidenhead		
Men J16 2-	Cardinal Vaughan School		
Men J16 2x	Radley College		
Men J16 2+	Westminster School		
Men J16 4+	Hampton School		
Men J16 4-	Hampton School		
Men J16 8+	Royal Shrewsbury School		
Women 4+	Stuart Ladies		

Key

Symbol	meaning
1, 2, 4, 8	crew size
+	coxed
-	coxless
x	sculls
14	Under-14
15	Under-15
16	Under-16
J	Junior
