= Heidrun Barth =

German rower (born 1961)

Personal information
- Nationality: German
- Born: 16 March 1961 (age 65) Heilbronn, Germany

Sport
- Sport: Rowing

Heidrun Barth (born 16 March 1961) is a German former rowing cox. She competed in two events at the 1984 Summer Olympics.
