= Heike Neu =

German rower

Personal information
- Nationality: German
- Born: 10 February 1965 (age 60); Saarbrücken, Germany

Sport
- Sport: Rowing

Heike Neu (born 10 February 1965) is a German rower. She competed in two events at the 1984 Summer Olympics.
