= Angelika Beblo =

German rower

Personal information
- Nationality: German
- Born: 11 March 1961 (age 64); Saarbrücken, Germany

Sport
- Sport: Rowing

Angelika Beblo (born 11 March 1961) is a German rower. She competed in two events at the 1984 Summer Olympics.
