= Kerstin Rehders =

German rower

Personal information
- Nationality: German
- Born: 18 November 1962 (age 62); Dormagen, Germany

Sport
- Sport: Rowing

Kerstin Rehders (born 18 November 1962) is a German rower. She competed at the 1984 Summer Olympics and the 1988 Summer Olympics.
