= Sabine Hinkelmann =

German rower

Personal information
- Nationality: German
- Born: 19 June 1960 (age 64); Berlin, Germany

Sport
- Sport: Rowing

Sabine Hinkelmann (born 19 June 1960) is a German rower. She competed in two events at the 1984 Summer Olympics.
