= Kathy Talbot =

British coxswain

Personal information
- Nationality: British
- Born: 17 August 1961 (age 63); Woking, England

Sport
- Sport: Rowing

Kathy Talbot (born 17 August 1961) is a British rowing coxswain. She competed in the women's coxed four event at the 1984 Summer Olympics.
