= Bradford Amateur Rowing Club =

British rowing club

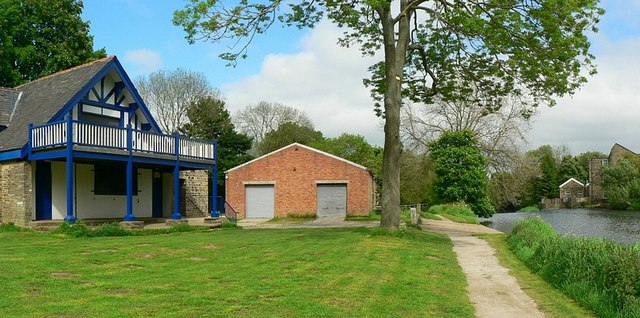

- Location: Saltaire, West Yorkshire, England
- Home water: River Aire
- Founded: 1867
- Colors: Dark blue and white
- Affiliations: British Rowing boat code - BRD
- Website: www.bradfordrowing.co.uk

Bradford Amateur Rowing Club (BARC) is a British Rowing affiliated club in Saltaire, West Yorkshire, England. The club's colours are dark blue and white and the crest features a boar's head with crossed blades.

The club competes in many races each year around the surrounding area and further afield and hosts two annual regattas in spring and autumn.

== History ==
The club was founded in 1867 and the boat house was built in 1893 on land given to the club by Sir Titus Salt.

Since April 2009 the club has hosted an annual scratch regatta for veterans named 'The War of the Roses' alluding to the war between Yorkshire and Lancashire. In October 2009, BARC crews won six events at Ancholme Head in North Lincolnshire, crews from all sections of the club won races. Also in October 2009, BARC secured a grant from Sport England to buy a new coxless quad, to keep up with the growing number of juniors that have joined the club since the beginning of Project Oarsome. The club also bought a new double and single scull for the Project Oarsome juniors.

== Juniors ==
Since BARC became one of 30 clubs to become a member of Project Oarsome in May 2001, the club has had a large juniors group. Project Oarsome gave the club a £50,000 grant to introduce rowing to children from local state schools. The club first forged links with nearby Titus Salt School before expanding the project to other local schools.

== Facilities ==
The club rows on a 600m stretch of the River Aire and has a boat house and a club house next to the two landing stages. On the ground floor of the club house are men’s and women’s changing rooms and a gym with ergos, weight machines, and floor space. Upstairs there is a function room with a bar and a balcony that looks out over the river.
