= Kate Holroyd =

British rower

Personal information
- Born: 5 June 1963 (age 63) Bradford, England

Sport
- Sport: Rowing
- Club: Bradford; Lea
Medal record
Rowing
Representing England
Commonwealth Games
| Silver medal – second place | 1986 Edinburgh | eight |
| Bronze medal – third place | 1986 Edinburgh | coxed four |

Kathryn 'Kate' Holroyd (born 5 June 1963) is a British retired rower.

== Rowing career ==
Holroyd competed in the women's eight event at the 1984 Summer Olympics. The team finished in eighth place. The following year Holroyd was part of the double sculls crew with Jean Genchi that won the national title in a dead-heat with Sons of the Thames, rowing for Bradford Amateur Rowing Club, at the 1985 National Rowing Championships. The race was the first dead heat for winners since the start of the Championships.

She represented England and won a silver medal in the eight and a bronze medal in the coxed four at the 1986 Commonwealth Games in Edinburgh, Scotland.
