= Rowing at the 1988 Summer Olympics – Men's double sculls =

Men's double sculls at the Games of the XXIV Olympiad
- Date: 19–24 September 1988
- Competitors: 34 from 17 nations

Medalists
1st place, gold medalist(s)		Nico Rienks; Ronald Florijn	Netherlands
2nd place, silver medalist(s)		Beat Schwerzmann; Ueli Bodenmann	Switzerland
3rd place, bronze medalist(s)		Oleksandr Marchenko; Vasil Yakusha	Soviet Union

The men's double sculls competition at the 1988 Summer Olympics took place at took place at Han River Regatta Course, South Korea.

== Competition format ==
The competition consisted of three main rounds (heats, semifinals, and finals) as well as a repechage. The 17 boats were divided into three heats for the first round, with 5 or 6 boats in each heat. The winner of each heat (3 boats total) advanced directly to the semifinals. The remaining 14 boats were placed in the repechage. The repechage featured three heats, with 4 or 5 boats in each heat. The top three boats in each repechage heat (9 boats total) advanced to the semifinals. The remaining 5 boats (4th and 5th placers in the repechage heats) were eliminated. The 12 semifinalist boats were divided into two heats of 6 boats each. The top three boats in each semifinal (6 boats total) advanced to the "A" final to compete for medals and 4th through 6th place; the bottom three boats in each semifinal were sent to the "B" final for 7th through 12th.

All races were over a 2000 metre course.

== Results ==
=== Heats ===
The heats were held on September 19. The winner of each heat advanced to the semifinals, with all others going to the repechage. No boats were eliminated in this round (a fact highlighted by the Swiss team, fourth place in their preliminary heat, ultimately winning the silver medal).

==== Heat 1 ====
The first heat featured a warm (21 °C) but rainy day, with 2.3 m/s northwest winds. It was primarily a contest between the Soviets (who led the full way) and the Norwegians (who started slower and were fourth at 500 metres, but pulled into second before the halfway mark), though the Soviet victory was never much in doubt. Spain started out in third, was passed by Norway but passed Chile, and ended in third as well. Canada ran fifth for the first 1500 metres before also passing Chile and finishing fourth. Chile started strong, in second place at 500 metres, but steadily dropped back through the field and finished fifth. The United States trailed the field throughout.

Rank	Rowers	Nation	Time	Notes
1	Oleksandr Marchenko; Vasil Yakusha	Soviet Union	6:16.77	Q
2	Per Sætersdal; Kjell Voll	Norway	6:18.63	R
3	José Manuel Bermúdez; Manuel Vera	Spain	6:26.78	R
4	Bruce Ford; Pat Walter	Canada	6:29.94	R
5	Alejandro Rojas; Marcelo Rojas	Chile	6:33.23	R
6	Glenn Florio; Kevin Still	United States	6:33.75	R

==== Heat 2 ====
The second heat was cooler (now 19 °C) and windier (5 m/s, west-northwest), but still rainy. It turned into a four-way race quickly, with Austria well behind after 500 metres and Mexico falling back as well by 1000 metres. At the halfway point, Bulgaria led followed by East Germany, Switzerland, then Denmark. The Germans and Danes pushed forward over the second half, while the Bulgarians and Swiss slowed. By the 1500 metre mark, the East German boat had overtaken Bulgaria and the Danish boat had passed Switzerland. In the last quarter of the course, Denmark surged past both the Germans and Bulgarians to take the victory.

Rank	Rowers	Nation	Time	Notes
1	Bjarne Eltang; Per Rasmussen	Denmark	6:13.19	Q
2	Uwe Heppner; Uwe Mund	East Germany	6:13.72	R
3	Vasil Radev; Daniel Yordanov	Bulgaria	6:17.92	R
4	Ueli Bodenmann; Beat Schwerzmann	Switzerland	6:22.39	R
5	Luis Miguel García; Joaquín Gómez	Mexico	6:45.16	R
6	Harald Faderbauer; Thomas Musyl	Austria	7:17.11	R

==== Heat 3 ====
The temperature continued to cool (18 °C) and the rain continued to fall for the third heat, though the wind calmed somewhat (3.7 m/s, west). There was little contest to this heat, with the Dutch boat leading from the start and winning by nearly 3 seconds. The West German team started slow, but caught Italy before the halfway mark and separated from the latter squad by over 4 seconds at the end. Finland and Greece brought up the rear at fourth and fifth place, respectively.

Rank	Rowers	Nation	Time	Notes
1	Ronald Florijn; Nico Rienks	Netherlands	6:16.32	Q
2	Christian Händle; Ralf Thienel	West Germany	6:21.95	R
3	Roberto Fusaro; Mauro Jagodnich	Italy	6:26.19	R
4	Reima Karppinen; Jorma Lehtelä	Finland	6:28.22	R
5	Konstantinos Ditsios; Pantelis Papaterpos	Greece	6:35.72	R

=== Repechage ===
The repechage was held on September 21. The top three boats in each of the three repechage heats advanced to the semifinals, with all others eliminated.

==== Repechage heat 1 ====
The repechage was held on a cool (13.9 °C for the first heat) but sunny day, with calmer winds than the heats (1.2 m/s east-northeast for the first heat). East Germany, after its narrow loss in the heats, led this repechage heat from start to finish. Finland and Spain battled back and forth for second and third, with Finland ultimately taking second. A late push by Mexico was insufficient to catch Spain for the last semifinals place. The United States made it to halfway in fourth place and not far behind the lead group, but faltered over the second half and finished fifth.

Rank	Rowers	Nation	Time	Notes
1	Uwe Heppner; Uwe Mund	East Germany	6:40.67	Q
2	Reima Karppinen; Jorma Lehtelä	Finland	6:42.99	Q
3	José Manuel Bermúdez; Manuel Vera	Spain	6:43.67	Q
4	Luis Miguel García; Joaquín Gómez	Mexico	6:45.59	
5	Glenn Florio; Kevin Still	United States	6:56.45	

==== Repechage heat 2 ====
The sunny day continued to warm (now 14.8 °C) and the wind remained steady (1.2 m/s, east-northeast). With all but one boat advancing the semifinals, the question was which team would finish last. Chile was only half a second behind third-place Norway at 500 metres, but fell further behind at each quarter-mark after that; the South Americans were eliminated. Switzerland led at each checkpoint, while Norway passed Italy during the second 500 metres.

Rank	Rowers	Nation	Time	Notes
1	Ueli Bodenmann; Beat Schwerzmann	Switzerland	6:37.86	Q
2	Per Sætersdal; Kjell Voll	Norway	6:41.15	Q
3	Roberto Fusaro; Mauro Jagodnich	Italy	6:43.22	Q
4	Alejandro Rojas; Marcelo Rojas	Chile	6:48.72	

==== Repechage heat 3 ====
The temperature continued to warm (15.3 °C) and the sun continued to shine; the wind shifted slightly (1.8 m/s, east-southeast). It was the second repechage heat of the day won by a German team, with West Germany matching the East German squad's placement from the first repechage heat. It took a second-half push, as the Bulgarian pair led through the halfway mark. The remaining three boats each spent time in the essential third-place position to earn the last spot in the semifinals; Greece had it after the first 500 metres, and Austria was in advancement place after 1000 metres and 1500 metres, but Canada finished in the third spot. Austria fell to fifth with a nearly-three-minute final 500 metres.

Rank	Rowers	Nation	Time	Notes
1	Christian Händle; Ralf Thienel	West Germany	6:37.84	Q
2	Vasil Radev; Daniel Yordanov	Bulgaria	6:41.10	Q
3	Bruce Ford; Pat Walter	Canada	6:46.55	Q
4	Konstantinos Ditsios; Pantelis Papaterpos	Greece	6:59.46	
5	Harald Faderbauer; Thomas Musyl	Austria	7:56.37	

=== Semifinals ===
The semifinals were held on September 22. There were two heats of six boats each; the top half advanced to the "A" final while the bottom half went to the "B" final (out of medal contention).

==== Semifinal 1 ====
The first semifinal featured heat winners the Soviet Union and Denmark, repechage winner West Germany, repechage second-placers Norway and Finland, and repechage third-placer Canada. It was a hot and sunny day, at 31.2 °C, with 1.4 m/s east-northeast wind. The Soviets led wire-to-wire, opening a nearly 3 second lead over the first 500 metres and never looking back. Norway started strong, but Denmark passed them before the halfway mark. West Germany made a late charge from fourth place to overtake both Norway and Denmark. This left third-place, and the last spot in the "A" final, to a battle between the two Scandinavian countries. Norway gained back ground in the last 500 metres, but was unable to catch Denmark, finishing a quarter-second behind. Canada and Finland were clearly behind the others throughout, flipping places between them after the halfway mark as Canada finished fifth and Finland sixth.

Rank	Rowers	Nation	Time	Notes
1	Oleksandr Marchenko; Vasil Yakusha	Soviet Union	6:21.78	QA
2	Christian Händle; Ralf Thienel	West Germany	6:23.55	QA
3	Bjarne Eltang; Per Rasmussen	Denmark	6:24.60	QA
4	Per Sætersdal; Kjell Voll	Norway	6:24.87	QB
5	Bruce Ford; Pat Walter	Canada	6:37.95	QB
6	Reima Karppinen; Jorma Lehtelä	Finland	6:43.31	QB

==== Semifinal 2 ====
The second semifinal featured heat winner the Netherlands, repechage winners East Germany and Switzerland, repechage second-placer Bulgaria, and repechage third-placers Italy and Spain. The temperature had cooled from the first semifinal (now 24.1 °C) and the wind was nearly calm (0.7 m/s, southwest). Bulgaria took the early lead, but was soon passed by East Germany. The top four remained relatively close throughout, with the Germans retaining the lead and winning by 1.68 seconds over the Netherlands. The Dutch, along with the Swiss, had been closing on the Bulgarians since the halfway mark. Switzerland, after a slow second quarter, had the best final 500 metres, passing Bulgaria to move into third by 0.34 seconds (and the "A" final advancement spot) but not quite catching the Netherlands (0.42 seconds behind) for second. Italy had briefly passed Switzerland around the halfway mark, but otherwise was in fifth throughout; Spain was last from the first quarter-mark to the finish.

Rank	Rowers	Nation	Time	Notes
1	Uwe Heppner; Uwe Mund	East Germany	6:17.89	QA
2	Ronald Florijn; Nico Rienks	Netherlands	6:19.57	QA
3	Ueli Bodenmann; Beat Schwerzmann	Switzerland	6:19.99	QA
4	Vasil Radev; Daniel Yordanov	Bulgaria	6:20.33	QB
5	Roberto Fusaro; Mauro Jagodnich	Italy	6:27.60	QB
6	José Manuel Bermúdez; Manuel Vera	Spain	6:31.03	QB

=== Finals ===
==== Final B ====
Final B, for 7th through 12th place, took place on September 23. It was a cool day, at 12.4 °C, but sunny. The winds were 2.6 m/s east-southeast. All three of the boats from the second semifinal beat the boats from the first semifinal. Spain, which had finished last in the semifinal, this time defeated Bulgaria and Italy, as well as the rest, to take 7th place overall. It required a last-to-first drive, however, as Spain was in sixth place in the heat after 500 metres—though only behind leaders Bulgaria by 2.23 seconds. Bulgaria held the lead through 1500 metres before being passed by Spain, finishing second in the race and 8th overall. Italy ended up in 9th overall. The boats from the other semifinal came in fourth/10th (Canada), fifth/11th (Norway), and sixth/12th (Finland).

Rank	Rowers	Nation	Time
7	José Manuel Bermúdez; Manuel Vera	Spain	7:02.34
8	Vasil Radev; Daniel Yordanov	Bulgaria	7:04.39
9	Roberto Fusaro; Mauro Jagodnich	Italy	7:06.01
10	Bruce Ford; Pat Walter	Canada	7:07.31
11	Per Sætersdal; Kjell Voll	Norway	7:09.42
12	Reima Karppinen; Jorma Lehtelä	Finland	7:20.72

==== Final A ====
Final A, for 1st through 6th places, was held on September 24, a temperate (20.7 °C), sunny day with 1.5 m/s northeast wind. The Soviets started with the lead, followed by the East and then West Germans. But none of those three teams finished higher than third; the Netherlands surged first, advancing from fourth place at the quarter-mark to second at the halfway point and then first—where they would finish—three-quarters of the way in. The Swiss also made a late push, charging all the way from fifth at the halfway mark (and fourth at 1500 metres) to edge out the Soviets for the silver medal by 0.28 seconds. The West German team, behind their East German counterparts most of the way, passed them as well in the last quarter as the East team dropped to fifth place. East Germany finished closer to last place Denmark than to fourth place.

Rank	Rowers	Nation	Time
1st place, gold medalist(s)	Ronald Florijn; Nico Rienks	Netherlands	6:21.13
2nd place, silver medalist(s)	Ueli Bodenmann; Beat Schwerzmann	Switzerland	6:22.59
3rd place, bronze medalist(s)	Oleksandr Marchenko; Vasil Yakusha	Soviet Union	6:22.87
4	Christian Händle; Ralf Thienel	West Germany	6:24.97
5	Uwe Heppner; Uwe Mund	East Germany	6:26.20
6	Bjarne Eltang; Per Rasmussen	Denmark	6:26.98

== Final classification ==
Rank	Rowers	Country
1st place, gold medalist(s)	Nico Rienks; Ronald Florijn	Netherlands
2nd place, silver medalist(s)	Beat Schwerzmann; Ueli Bodenmann	Switzerland
3rd place, bronze medalist(s)	Oleksandr Marchenko; Vasil Yakusha	Soviet Union
4	Christian Händle; Ralf Thienel	West Germany
5	Uwe Mund; Uwe Heppner	East Germany
6	Per Rasmussen; Bjarne Eltang	Denmark
7	José Manuel Bermúdez; Manuel Vera	Spain
8	Vasil Radev; Daniel Yordanov	Bulgaria
9	Roberto Fusaro; Mauro Jagodnich	Italy
10	Bruce Ford; Pat Walter	Canada
11	Per Sætersdal; Kjell Voll	Norway
12	Reima Karppinen; Jorma Lehtelä	Finland
13	Luis Miguel García; Joaquín Gómez	Mexico
13	Alejandro Rojas; Marcelo Rojas	Chile
13	Konstantinos Ditsios; Pantelis Papaterpos	Greece
16	Glenn Florio; Kevin Still	United States
16	Harald Faderbauer; Thomas Musyl	Austria
