= Rowing at the 1984 Summer Olympics – Men's coxless pair =

Men's coxless pair at the Games of the XXIII Olympiad
- Venue: Lake Casitas
- Date: 30 July – 5 August 1984
- Competitors: 28 from 14 nations
- Teams: 14
- Winning time: 6:45.39

Medalists
1st place, gold medalist(s)		Petru Iosub; Valer Toma	Romania
2nd place, silver medalist(s)		Fernando Climent; Luis María Lasúrtegui	Spain
3rd place, bronze medalist(s)		Hans Magnus Grepperud; Sverre Løken	Norway

The men's coxless pair (M2-) competition at the 1984 Summer Olympics took place at Lake Casitas in Ventura County, California, United States. It was held from 30 July to 5 August and the outcome was wide open due to the Eastern Bloc boycott and thus the absence of the dominating team from East Germany. The event was won by the team from Romania.

== Background ==
East Germany had won the coxless pair competition at every Summer Olympics since the 1968 Summer Olympics in Mexico, and they were the reigning world champion. The Soviet Union had won silver at the last Summer Olympics in this event, had won the 1981 World Rowing Championships, and had won silver in 1983. With both nations absent due to the Soviet Bloc boycott, the only competing nation that had won recent world championships was Norway, which had won the title in 1982. The competition was thus regarded as wide open.

=== Previous M2- competitions ===
Competition	Gold	Silver	Bronze
1980 Summer Olympics	East Germany	Soviet Union	Great Britain
1981 World Rowing Championships	Soviet Union	Netherlands	Italy
1982 World Rowing Championships	Norway	East Germany	Netherlands
1983 World Rowing Championships	East Germany	Soviet Union	Norway

== Results ==
=== Heats ===
The heats of the opening round were rowed on 31 July. The first three of every heat would progress to the semi-finals, whilst the other teams would go to the repechage.

==== Heat 1 ====
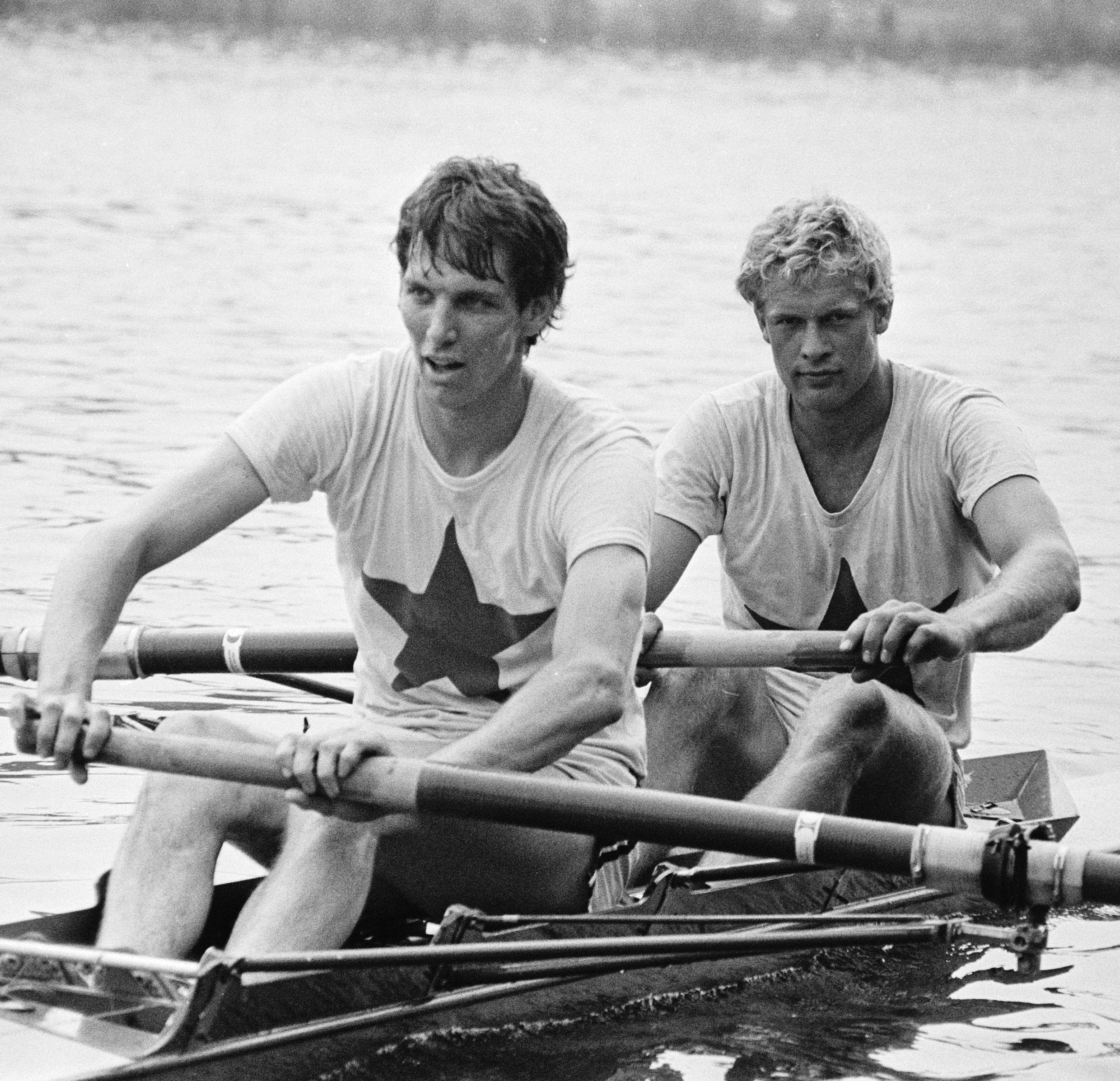
The Dutch competitors, Joost Adema (stroke) and Sjoerd Hoekstra, in 1982

Rank	Rower	Country	Time	Notes
1	Axel Wöstmann; Thomas Möllenkamp	West Germany	6:53.83	SF
2	Fernando Climent; Luis María Lasúrtegui	Spain	6:54.34	SF
3	Joost Adema; Sjoerd Hoekstra	Netherlands	7:01.47	SF
4	John Houlding; Jim Relle	Canada	7:07.70	R
5	Robert Booth; Jim Stride	Australia	7:23.71	R

==== Heat 2 ====
Rank	Rower	Country	Time	Notes
1	Hans Magnus Grepperud; Sverre Løken	Norway	6:56.29	SF
2	Petru Iosub; Valer Toma	Romania	6:56.60	SF
3	Dave De Ruff; John Strotbeck Jr.	United States	7:00.34	SF
4	Rubén D'Andrilli; Claudio Guindón	Argentina	7:00.87	R
5	Alfred Fischer (rower); Markus Wechsler	Switzerland	7:03.28	R

==== Heat 3 ====
Rank	Rower	Country	Time	Notes
1	Marco Romano; Pasquale Aiese	Italy	7:03.06	SF
2	Geoff Horan; Allan Horan	New Zealand	7:05.44	SF
3	John Beattie; Richard Stanhope	Great Britain	7:16.39	SF
4	Ronaldo de Carvalho; Ricardo de Carvalho	Brazil	7:32.69	R

=== Repechage ===
The repechage was rowed on 1 August. The first three would progress to the semi-finals, whilst the other two teams were eliminated.

The Swiss team changed seats in the repechage and then maintained the new configuration for the rest of the competition.

Rank	Rower	Country	Time	Notes
1	Markus Wechsler; Alfred Fischer (rower)	Switzerland	7:02.94	SF
2	Rubén D'Andrilli; Claudio Guindón	Argentina	7:04.33	SF
3	Ronaldo de Carvalho; Ricardo de Carvalho	Brazil	7:05.24	SF
4	John Houlding; Jim Relle	Canada	7:09.92	
5	Robert Booth; Jim Stride	Australia	7:10.12	

=== Semi-finals ===
The semi-finals were rowed on 2 August. The first three would progress to the A final, whilst the other teams would go to the B final.

==== Heat 1 ====
The Germans and the Dutch swapped seats in their semi-final and maintained the new configuration in their finals.

Rank	Rower	Country	Time	Notes
1	Hans Magnus Grepperud; Sverre Løken	Norway	6:53.52	FA
2	Thomas Möllenkamp; Axel Wöstmann	West Germany	6:57.14	FA
3	Dave De Ruff; John Strotbeck Jr.	United States	6:59.10	FA
4	Geoff Horan; Allan Horan	New Zealand	7:02.89	FB
5	Sjoerd Hoekstra; Joost Adema	Netherlands	7:04.61	FB
6	Ronaldo de Carvalho; Ricardo de Carvalho	Brazil	7:05.92	FB

==== Heat 2 ====
Rank	Rower	Country	Time	Notes
1	Petru Iosub; Valer Toma	Romania	6:53.23	FA
2	Fernando Climent; Luis María Lasúrtegui	Spain	6:53.58	FA
3	Marco Romano; Pasquale Aiese	Italy	6:58.38	FA
4	Markus Wechsler; Alfred Fischer (rower)	Switzerland	7:05.81	FB
5	Rubén D'Andrilli; Claudio Guindón	Argentina	7:08.35	FB
6	John Beattie; Richard Stanhope	Great Britain	7:09.17	FB

=== Finals ===
==== B final ====
The B final was rowed on 3 August.

Rank	Rower	Country	Time
7	Sjoerd Hoekstra; Joost Adema	Netherlands	7:02.62
8	Ronaldo de Carvalho; Ricardo de Carvalho	Brazil	7:03.97
9	Geoff Horan; Allan Horan	New Zealand	7:04.00
10	Rubén D'Andrilli; Claudio Guindón	Argentina	7:05.01
11	Markus Wechsler; Alfred Fischer (rower)	Switzerland	7:07.00
12	John Beattie; Richard Stanhope	Great Britain	7:08.07

==== A final ====
The A final was rowed on 5 August. Spain was a surprise medallist, and as of 2021, their silver medal is the only Olympic rowing medal that the nation has ever won.

Rank	Rower	Country	Time
1st place, gold medalist(s)	Petru Iosub; Valer Toma	Romania	6:45.39
2nd place, silver medalist(s)	Fernando Climent; Luis María Lasúrtegui	Spain	6:48.87
3rd place, bronze medalist(s)	Hans Magnus Grepperud; Sverre Løken	Norway	6:51.81
4	Thomas Möllenkamp; Axel Wöstmann	West Germany	6:52.53
5	Marco Romano; Pasquale Aiese	Italy	6:55.88
6	Dave De Ruff; John Strotbeck Jr.	United States	6:58.46
