= Borsini =

Borsini is an Italian surname. Notable people with the surname include:

- Costantino Borsini (1906–1940), Italian naval officer
- Lanfranco Borsini (fl. 1980s), Italian rower
- Renzo Borsini (fl. 1980s), Italian rower
