= Manuel Vázquez =

Manuel Vázquez may refer to:

- Manuel Vázquez Gallego (1930–1995), Spanish cartoonist
- Manuel Vázquez Hueso (born 1981), Spanish cyclist
- Manuel Vázquez Montalbán (1939–2003), Spanish writer
- Manuel Vázquez Portal (born 1951), Cuban poet and journalist
- Manuel Vera Vázquez (born 1962), Spanish rower

== See also ==
- Manuel Vasquez, Salvadoran academic
