= 1982 World Rowing Championships =

International rowing event

- Venue: Rotsee
- Location: Lucerne, Switzerland
- Dates: 28 to 29 August

The 1982 World Rowing Championships were World Rowing Championships that were held from 28 to 29 August 1982 at Rotsee in Lucerne, Switzerland.

== Medal summary ==
=== Men's events ===
Event	Gold	Time	Silver	Time	Bronze	Time
M1x	East Germany; Rüdiger Reiche	7:00.67	Soviet Union; Vasil Yakusha	7:01.15	United States; John Biglow	7:02.08
M2x	Norway; Rolf Thorsen; Alf Hansen	6:23.66	East Germany; Klaus Kröppelien; Joachim Dreifke	6:25.36	Czechoslovakia; Zdeněk Pecka; Václav Vochoska	6:28.08
M4x	East Germany; Karl-Heinz Bußert; Uwe Mund; Uwe Heppner; Martin Winter	5:55.50	West Germany; Albert Hedderich; Raimund Hörmann; Dieter Wiedenmann; Michael Dürsch	5:59.10	Soviet Union; Viktor Rudakovich; Vladimir Koldishkin; Aleksandr Sdramvomislov; Valeriy Kleshnyov	6:00.90
M2+	Italy; Carmine Abbagnale; Giuseppe Abbagnale; Giuseppe Di Capua (c)	6:59.63	East Germany; Jürgen Seyfarth; Karsten Schmeling; Hendrik Reiher (c)	7:01.55	Czechoslovakia; Milan Doleček Sr; Milan Skopek; Oldřich Hejdušek (c)	7:02.07
M2-	Norway; Hans Magnus Grepperud; Sverre Løken	6:41.98	East Germany; Carl Ertel; Ulf Sauerbrey	6:44.88	Netherlands; Sjoerd Hoekstra; Joost Adema	6:45.72
M4+	East Germany; Thomas Greiner; Hans Sennewald; Ulrich Kons; Ullrich Dießner; Andreas Gregor (c)	6:19.04	Czechoslovakia; Vojtech Caska; Josef Neštický; Jan Kabrhel; Karel Neffe; Jiří Pták (c)	6:21.69	United States; Andy Sudduth; Charles Altekruse; John Everett; Fred Borchelt; Robert Jaugstetter (c)	6:25.33
M4-	Switzerland; Bruno Saile; Jürg Weitnauer; Hans-Konrad Trümpler; Stefan Netzle	6:10.41	Soviet Union; Vitaliy Eliseyev; Aleksandr Kulagin; Valeriy Dolinin; Aleksey Kamkin	6:11.82	Romania; Petru Iosub; Valer Toma; Daniel Voiculescu; Constantin Airoaie	6:12.32
M8+	New Zealand; Les O'Connell; Mike Stanley; Andrew Stevenson; George Keys; Roger White-Parsons; Chris White; Tony Brook; Dave Rodger; Andy Hay (c)	5:36.99	East Germany; Jens Doberschütz; Hans-Peter Koppe; Gert Uebeler; Jörg Friedrich; Ralf Brudel; Harald Jährling; Bernd Niesecke; Bernd Höing; Klaus-Dieter Ludwig (c)	5:39.17	Soviet Union; Žoržs Tikmers; Dimants Krišjānis; Dzintars Krišjānis; Viktor Omelyanovich; Viktor Diduk; Vladimir Krilov; Zigmantas Gudauskas; Nikolai Solomakhin; Juris Bērziņš (c)	5:39.52
Lightweight events
LM1x	Austria; Raimund Haberl	7:12.57	United States; Scott Roop	7:14.26	Italy; Luca Migliaccio	7:14.58
LM2x	Italy; Francesco Esposito; Ruggero Verroca	06:34.85	United States; Paul Fuchs; William Belden	6:37.28	Switzerland; Kurt Steiner; Pius Z'rotz	06:38.87
LM4-	Italy; Marco Romano; Daniele Boschin; Paolo Martinelli; Pasquale Aiese	6:17.79	Spain; Guillermo Mueller Gascon; José María de Marco Pérez; Enrique Briones; Luis Marina Moreno Perpina	6:19.68	Denmark; Mikael Espersen; Flemming Jensen; Lars Porneki; Kim Hagsted	6:20.33
LM8+	Italy; Vittorio Valentinis; Mauro Torta; Franco Pantano; Valentino Tontodonati; Renzo Borsini; Lanfranco Borsini; Claudio Castiglioni; Leonardo Salani; Giuseppe Di Capua (c)	5:49.45	Denmark; Michael Djervig; Jørn Jørgensen; Ivar Mølgaard; Arne Højlund; Søren Hansson; Søren Christensen; Jan Christensen; Bent Fransson; Jan Rasmussen (c)	5:50.47	Spain; Fernando Climent; Angel Sáez Bernardos; Francisco Goicoechea García; Antonio Elizalde; Alberto Molina Castillo; Ángel Viana Bravo; Javier Puertas Cabezudo; Dionisio Redondo González; Jose Delgado (c)	5:51.90

=== Women's events ===
Event	Gold	Time	Silver	Time	Bronze	Time
W1x	Soviet Union; Irina Fetisova	3:42.83	Romania; Valeria Răcilă	3:42.92	New Zealand; Stephanie Foster	3:44.61
W2x	Soviet Union; Yelena Bratischko; Antonina Makhina	3:19.47	East Germany; Kerstin Kirst; Martina Schröter	3:23.05	Canada; Janice Mason; Lisa Roy	3:26.49
W4x+	Soviet Union; Larisa Popova; Yelena Khloptseva; Olga Kaspina; Tatiana Bachkatova; Maria Zemskova-Korotkova (c)	3:32.41	East Germany; Jutta Hampe; Heidi Westphal; Cornelia Linse; Jutta Ploch; Elke Rost (c)	3:12.48	Romania; Maria Micșa; Maricica Țăran; Elisabeta Lipă; Sofia Corban; Ecaterina Oancia (c)	3:16.63
W2-	East Germany; Silvia Fröhlich; Marita Sandig	3:32.41	Poland; Małgorzata Dłużewska; Czesława Kościańska	3:34.58	Canada; Elizabeth Craig; Tricia Smith	3:35.93
W4+	Soviet Union; Svetlana Semenova; Valentina Semenova; Galina Stepanova; Larisa Zavarzina; Nina Cheremisina (c)	3:17.16	United States; Kathy Keeler; Carol Bower; Harriet Metcalf; Barbara Kirch; Valerie McClain-Ward (c)	3:19.55	Romania; Rodica Arba; Mihaela Armășescu; Aurora Darko; Elena Horvat; Cristina Dinu (c)	3:19.71
W8+	Soviet Union; Elena Makushkina; Ludmila Konopleva; Nina Umanets; Elena Tereshina; Nataliya Yatsenko; Marina Studneva; Raissa Doligaida; Sarmīte Stone; Nina Frolova (c)	2:57.97	United States; Liz Miles; Shyril O'Steen; Kristine Norelius; Jan Harville; Jennie Marshall; Joline Esparza; Jane McDougall; Kristen Thorsness; Nanette Bernadou (c)	3:01.50	East Germany; Claudia Noack; Ute Steindorf; Sabine Portius; Carola Hornig; Steffi Götzelt; Sigrid Anders; Iris Rudolph; Karin Metze; Kirsten Wenzel (c)	3:02.89

== Medal table ==
Place	Nation	1st place, gold medalist(s)	2nd place, silver medalist(s)	3rd place, bronze medalist(s)	Total
1	Soviet Union	5	2	2	9
2	East Germany	4	6	2	12
3	Italy	4	0	1	5
4	Norway	2	0	0	2
5	New Zealand	1	0	1	2
6	Austria	1	0	0	1
6	Switzerland	1	0	0	1
8	United States	0	4	2	6
9	Czechoslovakia	0	1	2	3
9	Romania	0	1	2	3
10	Denmark	0	1	1	2
10	Spain	0	1	1	2
11	West Germany	0	1	0	1
11	Poland	0	1	0	1
12	Canada	0	0	2	2
13	Netherlands	0	0	1	1
Total		18	18	18	54
