= Fusaro =

Fusaro may refer to:

- Fusaro (surname)
- Fusaro Lake, a lake in Naples, Italy
- Fusaro railway station, a railway station in Naples, Italy
