= Jim Stride =

Australian rower

Personal information
- Nationality: Australian
- Born: 7 April 1955 (age 70)

Sport
- Sport: Rowing

Jim Stride (born 7 April 1955) is an Australian former representative rower. He was a six-time Australian national champion, raced in the Australia men's eight at the 1978 World Rowing Championships and competed in the men's coxless pair event at the 1984 Summer Olympics.

== Club and state rowing ==
Jim Stride's senior rowing was the Sydney Rowing Club where for much of his career he was coached by his father Reg Stride.

Stride made his state representative debut for New South Wales sculling for the President's Cup at the 1977 Interstate Regatta within the Australian Rowing Championships. At the time, states would nominate more than one entrant, and competitors would proceed through heats and eliminations. In 1978 Stride moved in the New South Wales senior men's eight contesting the King's Cup. He made New South Wales King's Cup crews in 1978, 1979 and rowed to victory in those boats in 1978 and 1984.

Between 1977 and 1981 in Sydney Rowing Club colours, Stride contested both the men's double scull and quadruple scull championship events at the Australian Rowing Championships. He won national titles in the quad in 1978 and 1979 and in the double in 1980 and 1981. He contested the national quad sculls event in 1982 and the men's coxless pair title in 1984.

== International representative rowing ==
In 1978, the entire New South Wales King's Cup winning crew was selected to race for Australia at the 1978 World Rowing Championships in Lake Karapiro in New Zealand. That boat finished second in the heat behind West Germany the eventual silver medallists, third place in their repechage and fourth in the final being edged out by New Zealand.

In 1984, Stride made his second and final Australian representative appearance when he was selected with Robert Booth to row Australia's coxless pair at the Los Angeles Olympics. They were eliminated in the repechage.
