= Petru Iosub =

Romanian rower

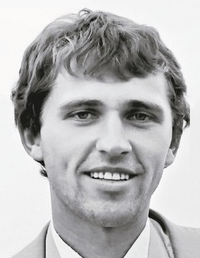

Personal information
- Born: 16 June 1961 (age 65) Fălticeni, Romania
- Height: 191 cm (6 ft 3 in)
- Weight: 93 kg (205 lb)

Sport
- Sport: Rowing
- Club: Dinamo Bucharest
Medal record
Representing Romania
Olympic Games
Gold medal – first place	1984 Los Angeles	Coxless pairs
World Rowing Championships
Bronze medal – third place	1982 Lucerne	Coxless fours

Petru Iosub (born 16 June 1961) is a retired Romanian rower. He first competed in coxless fours, placing fifth at the 1980 Olympics and winning a bronze medal at the 1982 World Championships. Later he changed to coxless pairs and won a gold medal at the 1984 Olympics, together with Valer Toma.
