= John Strotbeck =

American rower

John Strotbeck III (born June 19, 1957) is an American rower, who rowed in the 1984 and 1988 Olympic Games, and was elected the Olympic team captain in the latter. His company, Boathouse Sports, is a manufacturer of custom team athletic apparel made in the United States. Strotbeck currently lives in Montgomery County, Pennsylvania with his wife Stephanie and son Max.

== Biography ==
=== Early life ===
Strotbeck was born in 1957 in Bryn Mawr, Pennsylvania. Growing up on the sandy beaches of the South Jersey Shore certainly had an effect on a young John Strotbeck. Like many who grew up in Margate, New Jersey, Strotbeck immersed himself in the ocean culture; working summers as a life guard when not in school and spending the rest of his time rowing and surfing in big waves provided by the Atlantic Ocean.

Strotbeck started to row competitively in his senior year of high school after spending his first years playing football and wrestling. His talent on the water spoke for itself and earned Strotbeck a spot on Marietta College's rowing team his freshman year. His drive kept him at the top throughout college.

Though small for a world-class rower – standing 6'2" and weighing 180 pounds – Strotbeck cycled through the power seats of the boat. His advantage over the competition was his tremendous efficiency and ability to move a boat fast.

=== Athletic career ===
After taking a brief hiatus, Strotbeck returned to the world of competitive rowing after moving to Philadelphia in 1981. Philadelphia is a haven for rowers as the city offered access to world-class coaches, rowing equipment, and the Schuylkill River, which houses one of the largest regattas in the country and historic Boathouse Row.

After training intensely throughout the winter of 1983, Strotbeck made the 1983 Pan Am team rowing for the Vesper Boat Club. Assuming he would not make it through the first seat race, Pan Am Coach John Bannan consented to allow Strotbeck to try out. After winning the first seat race, and many more after, Bannan relented on his initial position and gave Strotbeck a seat in the Pan Am boat. Strotbeck's crew placed second in the 1983 Pan American Games earning the team a silver medal.

Prior to the 1984 Olympic games, the US Rowing team's coaching philosophy had been focused on recruiting from traditionally established schools for the Olympic and World Games. There was initially no interest in finding a spot on the team for Strotbeck who had few competitive accolades and hailed from Division-III Marietta College. After preliminary testing in Princeton, Strotbeck was told he would not make the 1984 Olympic team. However, US Rowing, the sports governing body, looked outside the United States for the coach of Team 1984, in order to achieve better performance. Kris Korzenowski, a Polish expatriate coaching the Italian team, was hired as the 1984 Olympic Rowing Team's head coach. Because Korzenowski was not predisposed to recruiting from the predominant American rowing schools, Strotbeck found himself in the crew of the 1984 US Olympic Rowing team. Strotbeck competed over the next six years for the US National team at the 1988 Olympics, World Championships, Pan Ams and numerous European regattas.

Strotbeck's boat placed sixth in 1984 in the coxless pair, where he partnered with Dave De Ruff.
