= Robert Booth =

Robert Booth may refer to:

== People ==
=== Politicians ===
- Robert Booth (MP for Bodmin) (c. 1699–1733), English MP
- Robert Booth (MP for New Shoreham) (fl. 1601), English MP
- Robert Booth (Australian politician) (1851–1901)
- Robert Coulter Booth (1846–1918), Australian politician

=== Other people ===
- Robert Booth (actor), British actor in the 1967 TV serial The Lion, the Witch and the Wardrobe
- Robert Booth (priest) (1662–1730), Dean of Bristol
- Robert Booth (judge) (1626–1680), Lord Chief Justice of the King's Bench for Ireland
- Robert Booth (rower) (born 1964), Australian rower
- Robert Booth (tennis), British tennis player
- Bobby Booth (1890–after 1925), English footballer
- Robbie Booth (born 1985), English footballer

== Characters ==
- President Robert L. Booth, in Judge Dredd

== See also ==
- Sir Robert Gore-Booth, 4th Baronet (1805–1876)
- Booth (surname)
