= Vasil Yakusha =

Belarusian rower (1958–2020)

Personal information
- Born: Vasily Fyodorovich Yakusha; 30 June 1958 Kiev, Ukrainian SSR, Soviet Union
- Died: 24 November 2020 (aged 62)
- Height: 193 cm (6 ft 4 in)
- Weight: 93 kg (205 lb)

Sport
- Sport: Rowing
Medal record
Men's rowing
Olympic Games
Silver medal – second place	1980 Moscow	Single sculls
Bronze medal – third place	1988 Seoul	Double sculls
Friendship Games
Gold medal – first place	1984 Moscow	Single sculls
World Championships
Silver medal – second place	1982 Lucerne	Single sculls
Bronze medal – third place	1986 Nottingham	Single sculls

Vasil Fyodaravich Yakusha (Belarusian: Васіль Фёдаравіч Якуша, 30 June 1958 – 24 November 2020) was a Belarusian rower who competed for the Soviet Union in the 1980 Summer Olympics and in the 1988 Summer Olympics. During most of his career, he was a single sculler.

He was born in Kyiv, Ukraine. At the 1980 Summer Olympics, he won the silver medal in the single sculls event. At the 1981 World Rowing Championships, he came eighth. At the 1982 World Rowing Championships, he won the silver medal. At the 1983 World Rowing Championships, he came fourth. He did not attend the 1984 Summer Olympics in California, USA, due to the Eastern Bloc boycott. At the 1985 World Rowing Championships, he came fourth. At the 1986 World Rowing Championships, he won the bronze medal.

At the 1988 Summer Olympics in Seoul, South Korea, he and his partner Oleksandr Marchenko won the bronze medal in the double sculls competition.

Yakusha died on 24 November 2020 at the age of 62.
