= Salani =

Salani may refer to:

- Salani dialect, spoken in India
- Salani, Samoa, a village in Atua District, Samoa
- Salani, an Italian surname; notable people with the name include:
  - Corso Salani (1961–2010), director and actor
  - Leonardo Salani, rower
  - Mario Salani (born 1966), yacht racer
- Salani (publisher), an Italian publisher
