= Fusaro (surname) =

Fusaro is a surname. Notable people with the surname include:

- Chris Fusaro (born 1989), Scottish rugby union player
- Magda Fusaro (born 1970), university professor and academic administrator
- Roberto Fusaro (born 1968), Italian rower
- Veronica Fusaro (born 1997), Swiss singer and songwriter
