= Jan Jensen =

Jan Jensen may refer to:

- Jan Jensen (basketball), American basketball coach and player
- Jan Jensen (ice hockey) (born 1971), Danish ice hockey goaltender
- Jan Jensen (rower), Danish lightweight rower
- Jan Jensen (skiing) (1944–2002), Norwegian sports official
- Jan Krogh Jensen (1958–1996), Danish mobster and member of the Bandidos Motorcycle Club
- Jan Olav Jensen (born 1959), Norwegian architect
