= Pasquale Aiese =

Italian lightweight rower

Personal information
- Born: 27 April 1962 (age 64) Naples, Italy

Sport
- Sport: Rowing
Medal record
Men's rowing
Representing Italy
World Rowing Championships
Gold medal – first place	1982 Lucerne	Lwt men's four
Silver medal – second place	1986 Nottingham	Men's pair
Summer Universiade
Bronze medal – third place	1987 Zagreb	Coxless pairs

Pasquale Aiese (born 27 April 1962) is an Italian lightweight rower. He won a gold medal at the 1982 World Rowing Championships in Lucerne with the lightweight men's four. He competed at the 1984 Summer Olympics in the coxless pair with Marco Romano where they came fifth.
