= Højlund =

Højlund is a Danish surname. Notable people with the surname include:

- Arne Højlund, Danish rower
- Emil Højlund (born 2005), Danish footballer
- Mie Højlund (born 1997), Danish handball player
- Nicklas Højlund (born 1990), Danish footballer
- Ole Højlund Pedersen (born 1943), Danish cyclist
- Oscar Højlund (born 2005), Danish footballer
- Rasmus Højlund (born 2003), Danish footballer
