= Seyfarth =

Seyfarth is a German language surname that stems from the male given name Siegfried. Notable people with the name include:

- Alex Seyfarth (born 1999), Australian professional rugby league footballer
- Andreas Seyfarth (born 1962), German-style board game designer
- Juliane Seyfarth (born 1990), German ski jumper
- Jürgen Seyfarth (fl. 1981–1983), German rower
- Robert Seyfarth (scientist) (born 1948), American primatologist and author
- Robert Seyfarth (1878–1950), American architect
