= Uwe Mund (rower) =

East German rower

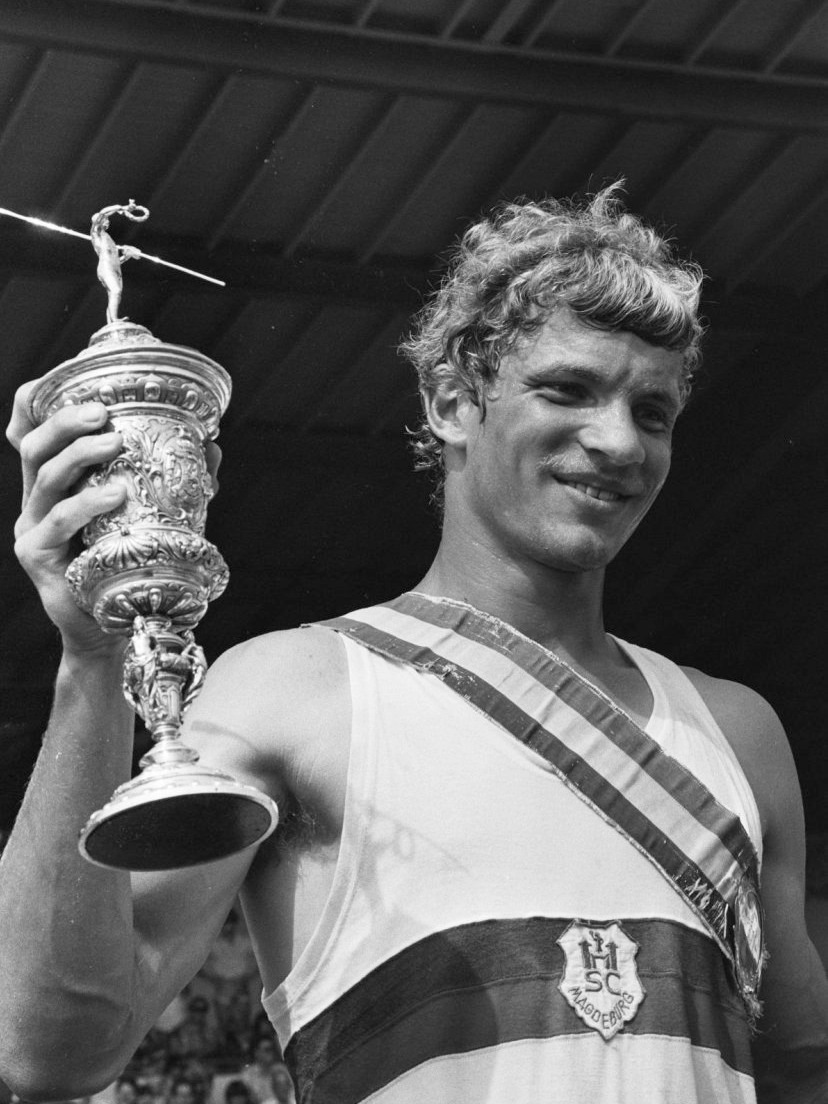
- Uwe Mund in 1982

Personal information
- Born: 26 June 1962 (age 64) Roßla, Saxony-Anhalt, Germany
- Height: 190 cm (6 ft 3 in)
- Weight: 89 kg (196 lb)

Sport
- Sport: Rowing
- Club: SC Magdeburg
Medal record
Representing East Germany
World Rowing Championships
Gold medal – first place	1982 Lucerne	Quadruple sculls
Silver medal – second place	1983 Duisburg	Single sculls
Friendship Games
Gold medal – first place	1984 Moscow	Quadruple sculls

Uwe Mund (born 26 June 1962) is a retired German rower. He competed for East Germany at the 1988 Summer Olympics and finished in fifth place in the double sculls event, together with Uwe Heppner. He won a gold and a silver medal at the senior world championships of 1982 and 1983, respectively; he also won a gold and a silver medal at the junior world championships in 1979 and 1980.
