= Padina, Buzău =

Padina
- Commune
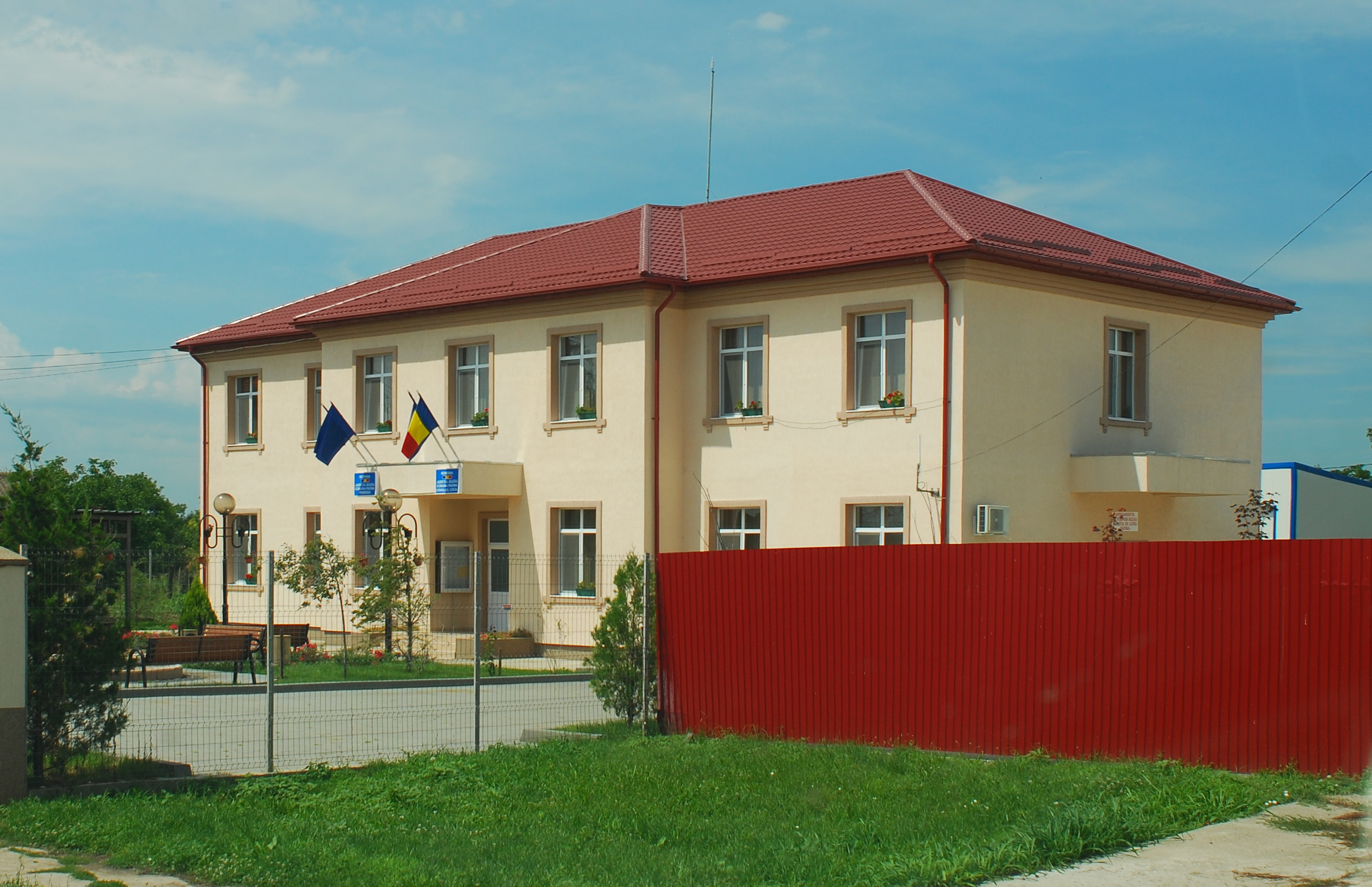
- Padina town hall

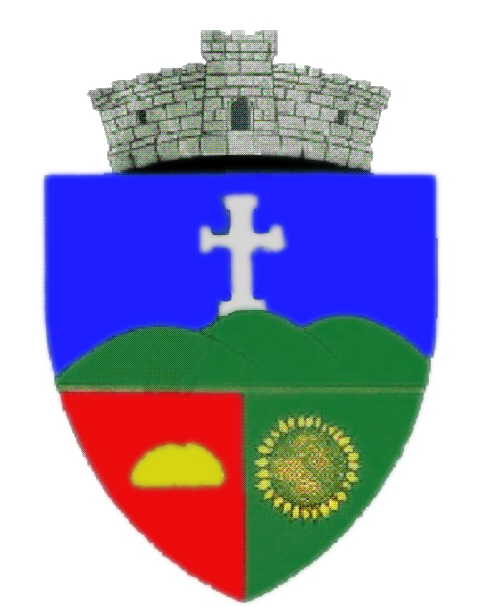
- Coat of arms

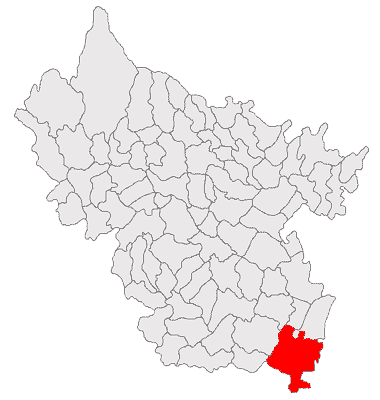
- Location in Buzău County

- Location in Romania
- Coordinates: 44°50′N 27°7′E
- Country: Romania
- County: Buzău

Government
  - Mayor (2020–2024): Ionel Chiriță (PNL)
- Area: 186.8 km^{2} (72.1 sq mi)
- Elevation: 62 m (203 ft)
- Population (2021-12-01): 3,451
  - Density: 18.47/km^{2} (47.85/sq mi)
- Time zone: UTC+02:00 (EET)
  - Summer (DST): UTC+03:00 (EEST)
- Postal code: 127395
- Area code: +(40) 238
- Vehicle reg.: BZ
- Website: www.primariapadina.ro

Padina is a commune in Buzău County, Muntenia, Romania. It is composed of a single village, Padina. It formerly included Tătulești village, now depopulated.

The commune is located in the Bărăgan Plain, in the extreme southeast of the county, on the border with Brăila County and Ialomița County. It is crossed by the national road DN2C that connects Buzău with Slobozia; county road DJ203E branches off from here, connecting Padina with Rușețu.

Historical population
Year	Pop.	±%
2002	4,854	—
2011	4,111	−15.3%
2021	3,451	−16.1%
Source: Census data

== Natives ==
- Valer Toma (born 1957), rower

== Notes ==
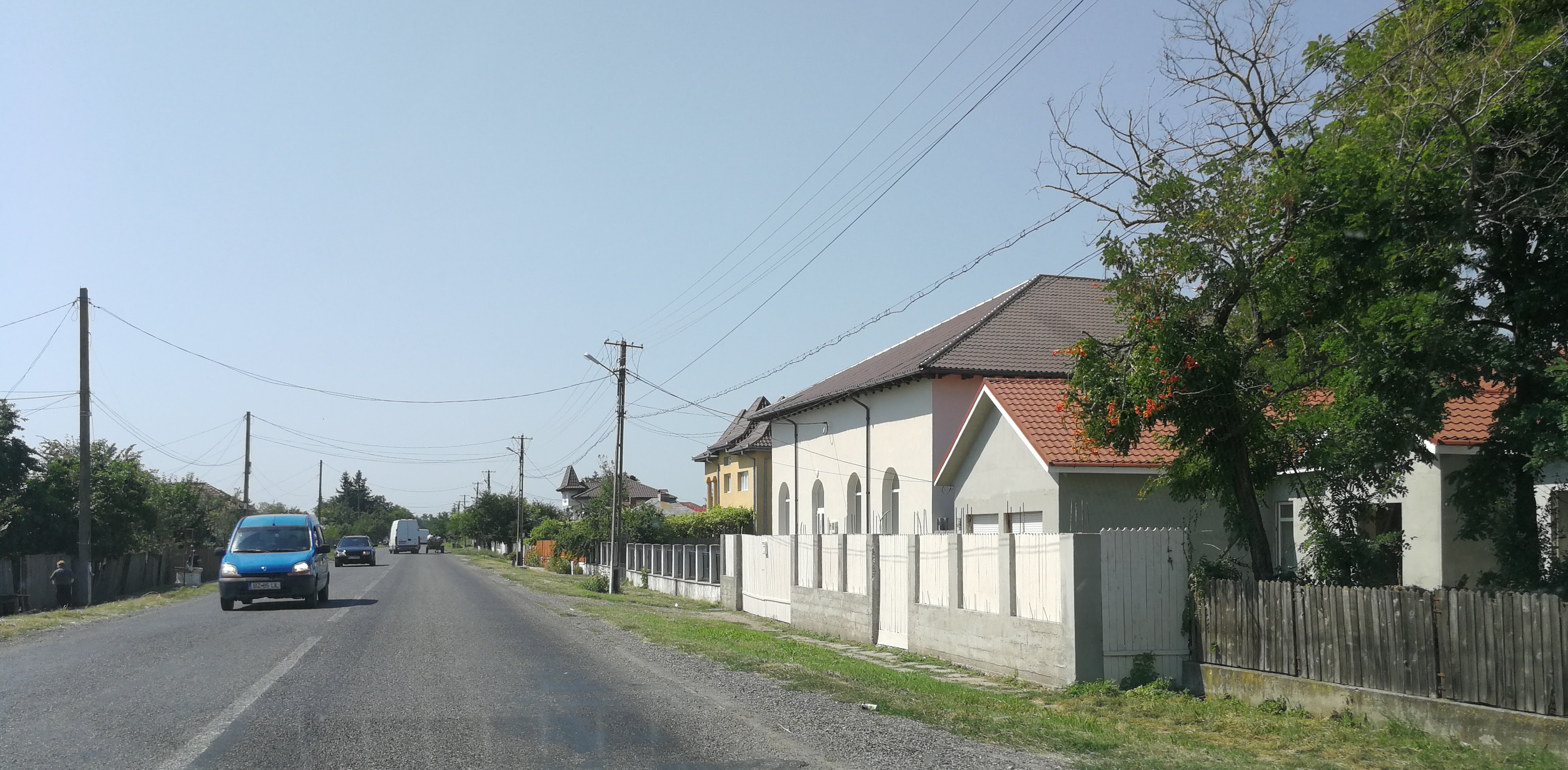
Padina

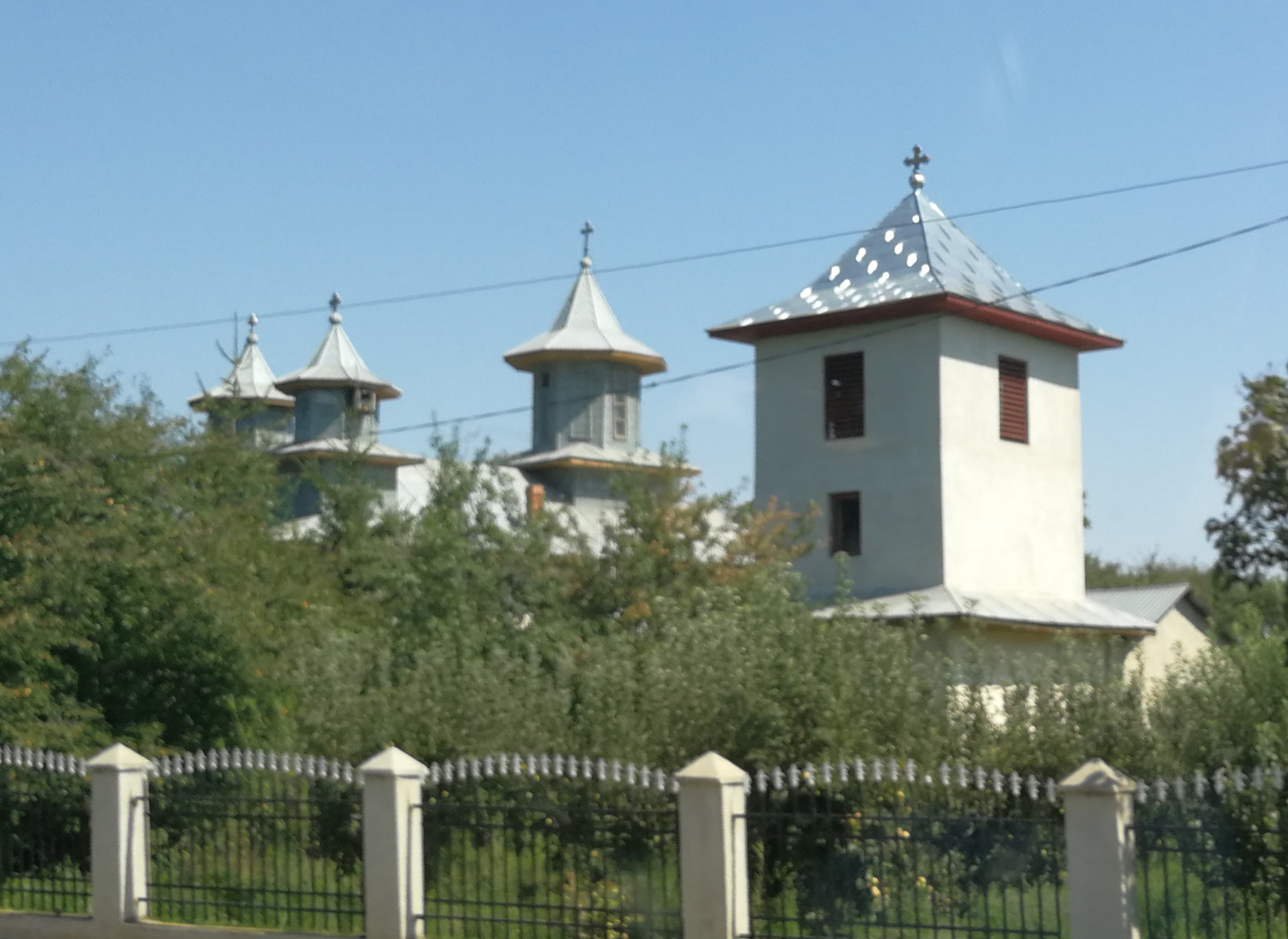
Church in Padina
