= Maria Zemskova-Korotkova =

Russian rowing coxswain

Maria Zemskova-Korotkova (born 7 February 1953) is a Russian rowing coxswain. She won gold medals at World Rowing Championships in the women's coxed quad scull in 1981, 1982, and 1983.
