= Beat Schwerzmann =

Swiss rower

Medal record

Men's rowing

Representing Switzerland

Olympic Games
| Silver medal – second place | 1988 Seoul | Double sculls |

World Rowing Championships
| Silver medal – second place | 1990 Tasmania | M4x |

Beat Schwerzmann (born 28 April 1966) is a Swiss rower. His wife Ingeburg is also a successful rower.
