= Ronald Florijn =

Dutch rower (born 1961)

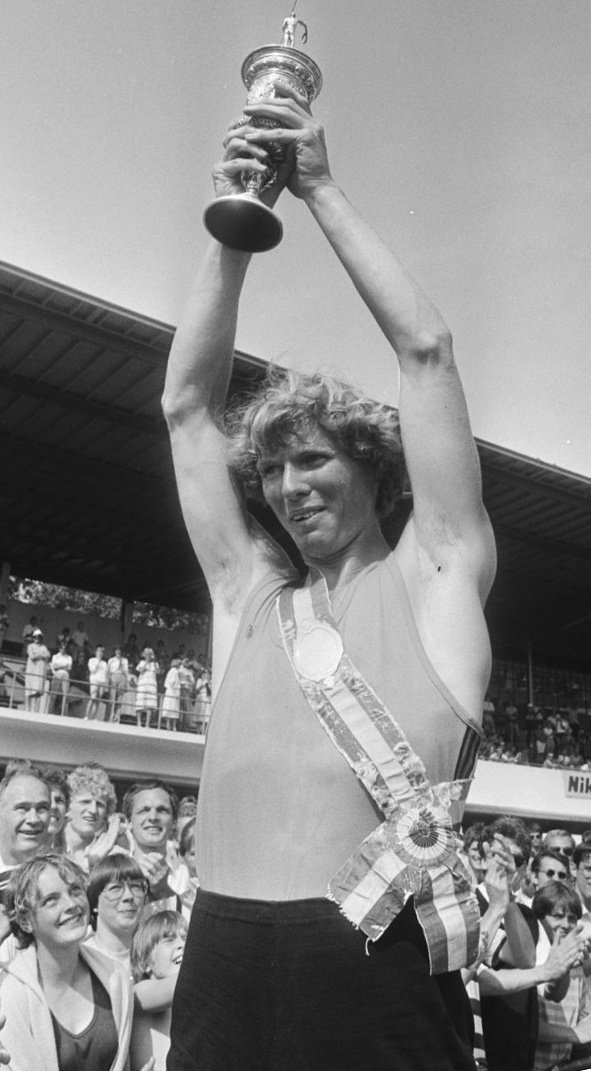
- Ronald Florijn in 1983

Personal information
- Born: 21 April 1961 (age 65) Leiden, the Netherlands
- Education: Leiden University
- Height: 1.91 m (6 ft 3 in)
- Weight: 94 kg (207 lb)
- Children: Karolien Florijn, Finn Florijn, Beer Florijn

Sport
- Sport: Rowing
- Club: R.S.V.U. Okeanos
Medal record
Representing the Netherlands
Olympic Games
Gold medal – first place	1988 Seoul	Double sculls
Gold medal – first place	1996 Atlanta	Eight
World Championships
Silver medal – second place	1989 Lake Bled	Double sculls
Silver medal – second place	1994 Tampere	Eights
Silver medal – second place	1995 Indianapolis	Eights
Bronze medal – third place	1991 Vienna	Four

Ronald Florijn (born 21 April 1961) is a former rower from the Netherlands and two-time Olympic gold medallist.

Florijn won the gold medal in the men's double sculls at the 1988 Summer Olympics, alongside Nico Rienks. At the 1996 Summer Olympics, he repeated his gold medal performance winning the eight with coxswain event with the Holland Acht (Holland Eight). He also won five medals at the world championships in 1978–1995 in double, four and eight-manned boat races.

He studied industrial and organizational psychology at the Leiden University and then worked for Arbo Unie, one of the biggest occupational health organizations in the Netherlands. Since 2004 he runs his own company. He is a knight of the Order of Orange-Nassau.
