= Thomas Musyl =

Austrian rower

Personal information
- Nationality: Austrian
- Born: 13 January 1967 (age 58); Neuilly-sur-Seine, France

Sport
- Sport: Rowing

Thomas Musyl (born 13 January 1967) is an Austrian rower. He competed in the men's double sculls event at the 1988 Summer Olympics.
