= Ueli Bodenmann =

Swiss rower (born 1965)

Personal information
- Born: 14 March 1965 (age 61) St. Gallen, Switzerland
Medal record
Men's rowing
Representing Switzerland
Olympic Games
Silver medal – second place	1988 Seoul	Double sculls
World Rowing Championships
Silver medal – second place	1990 Tasmania	Quad sculls

Ueli Bodenmann (born 14 March 1965 in St. Gallen) is a Swiss rower. He is 191 cm tall and lives in Wilen, Switzerland. Bodenmann is a member of Rorschach SC.
