= Vasil Radev =

Bulgarian rower (born 1961)

Personal information
- Born: Vasil Dimitrov Radev; 13 January 1961 (age 65) Ihtiman, Bulgaria

Sport
- Sport: Rowing
Medal record
Men's rowing
Representing Bulgaria
World Rowing Championships
Gold medal – first place	1987 Copenhagen	Double sculls
Summer Universiade
Silver medal – second place	1987 Zagreb	Single sculls

Vasil Dimitrov Radev (Bulgarian: Васил Димитров Радев; born 13 January 1961) is a Bulgarian rower.

Radev was born in Ihtiman in 1961. He won a gold medal at the 1987 World Rowing Championships in Copenhagen with the men's double sculls. He competed at the 1988 Summer Olympics in Seoul in double sculls partnered with Daniel Yordanov, where they came eighth.
