= Hans Magnus Grepperud =

Norwegian rower (born 1958)

Medal record

Representing Norway

Men's Rowing

Olympic Games
Bronze medal – third place	1984 Los Angeles	Coxless pair

World Rowing Championships
Gold medal – first place	1982 Lucerne	Coxless pair

Hans Magnus Grepperud (born 10 May 1958) is a Norwegian competition rower and Olympic medalist.

He received a bronze medal in coxless pairs at the 1984 Summer Olympics in Los Angeles, together with Sverre Løken.
