= Fernando Climent =

Spanish rower

Personal information
- Born: 27 May 1958 (age 68) Coria del Río
- Height: 179 cm (5 ft 10 in)
- Weight: 72 kg (159 lb)

Sport
- Sport: Rowing
Medal record
Men's rowing
Representing Spain
Olympic Games
Silver medal – second place	1984 Los Angeles	Coxless pair
World Rowing Championships
Silver medal – second place	1977 Amsterdam	Lwt eight
Gold medal – first place	1979 Bled	Lwt eight
Bronze medal – third place	1980 Hazewinkel	Lwt eight
Bronze medal – third place	1981 Munich	Lwt eight
Bronze medal – third place	1982 Lucerne	Lwt eight
Bronze medal – third place	1985 Hazewinkel	Coxless pair
Bronze medal – third place	1991 Vienna	Lwt coxless four
Gold medal – first place	1993 Račice	Lwt coxless pair
Silver medal – second place	1989 Bled	Lwt double sculls

Fernando Climent Huerta (born 27 May 1958 in Coria del Río, Sevilla) is a retired competition rower and Olympic medalist from Spain.

He won a silver medal in the coxless pair event at the 1984 Summer Olympics in Los Angeles, together with Luis María Lasúrtegui. He is now the President of the Spanish Rowing Federation.
