= Mikael Espersen =

Danish rower

Sport
- Sport: Rowing
Medal record
Men's rowing
Representing Denmark
World Rowing Championships
Gold medal – first place	1981 Munich	Lwt eight
Gold medal – first place	1984 Montreal	Lwt eight
Bronze medal – third place	1982 Lucerne	Lwt four
Bronze medal – third place	1983 Duisburg	Lwt eight

Mikael Espersen is a Danish lightweight rower. He won a gold medal at the 1981 World Rowing Championships in Munich with the lightweight men's eight.
