= Kjell Voll =

Norwegian rower

Personal information
- Nationality: Norwegian
- Born: 12 March 1966 (age 59); Stavanger, Norway

Sport
- Sport: Rowing

Kjell Voll (born 12 March 1966) is a Norwegian rower. He competed in the men's double sculls event at the 1988 Summer Olympics.
