= Markus Wechsler =

Swiss rower

Personal information
- Nationality: Swiss
- Born: 9 November 1960 (age 64)

Sport
- Sport: Rowing

Markus Wechsler (born 9 November 1960) is a Swiss rower. He competed in the men's coxless pair event at the 1984 Summer Olympics.
