= Geoff Horan =

New Zealand rower

Personal information
- Born: Geoffrey Raymond Horan; 18 May 1960 (age 66) Hamilton, New Zealand
- Height: 178 cm (5 ft 10 in)
- Weight: 82 kg (181 lb)
- Relative: Allan Horan (brother)

Sport
- Country: New Zealand
- Sport: Rowing

Geoffrey Raymond Horan (born 18 May 1960) is a retired New Zealand rower.

== Early life ==
Horan was born in 1960 in Hamilton, New Zealand. He received his education at Ōtūmoetai College in Tauranga.

== Rowing career ==
Starting his career as a high school and club rower at 15, New Zealand, At the Maadi Cup regatta in 1977, Horan won the New Zealand schoolboy single sculls title, and came second in the U18 coxed four, with his younger brother Allan Horan as a crew member. He joined the Waikato rowing club in 1978 and enjoyed many years of success at New Zealand Championships, firstly in pairs rowing at senior level, then in eights at the Premier "red coat" level. He was first selected for New Zealand as a stroke of the 1979 "Colts" under-21 team coxed eights, against N.S.W. Australia, and won the series. In 1980 Horan was once again selected as stroke for the "Colts" eight, successfully defending the series.

Horan represented New Zealand in the coxless pair, with his brother Allan Horan, at the 1984 Summer Olympics in Los Angeles. They came ninth in the competition. He is listed as New Zealand Olympian number 449. He was once again selected as stroke for the New Zealand eight at the 1985 World Rowing Championships in Hazewinkel, Belgium. The crew missed a medal, beaten by the United States to fourth place. Horan retired from rowing in 1986 after six straight years of New Zealand titles in the eight oar from 1981 to 1986.

== Personal life ==
Horan's wife Gay was a competitive rower, representing Australia 1981 lightweight coxless pair and 1982 lightweight coxed four, and then moved to New Zealand and competed for her husband's country in 1983. Horan has worked as a steel fabricator and they have lived in Papua New Guinea before moving to Thailand in 1996. Gay Horan established a coaching programme for rowing while there. A lightweight women's quad scull team from Thailand competed at the 2010 World Rowing Championships on Lake Karapiro, New Zealand.Gay Horan coached Thailand on and off over 10 years . The Thai team came sixth in their event.
