= Oleksandr Marchenko (rower) =

Ukrainian rower

Medal record

Men's rowing

Representing the Soviet Union

Olympic Games
Bronze medal – third place	1988 Seoul	Double sculls

Representing Ukraine

World Rowing Championships
Silver medal – second place	1993 Račice	M4x
Silver medal – second place	1994 Indianapolis	M4x
Silver medal – second place	1999 St. Catharines	M4x
Bronze medal – third place	1997 Aiguebelette	M4x

Oleksandr Mykolaiovych Marchenko (Ukrainian: Олександр Миколайович Марченко, born 12 January 1968 in Kherson) is a Ukrainian rower. He and his partner Vasil Yakusha won the bronze medal for the Soviet Union in the double sculls competition at the 1988 Summer Olympics.
