= Daniel Yordanov =

Bulgarian rower (born 1967)

Personal information
- Born: Daniel Bonchev Yordanov; 1 January 1967 (age 59) Dupnitsa

Sport
- Sport: Rowing
Medal record
Men's rowing
Representing Bulgaria
World Rowing Championships
| Gold medal – first place | 1987 Copenhagen | Double sculls |

Daniel Bonchev Yordanov (Bulgarian: Даниел Бончев Йорданов) (born 1 January 1967) is a Bulgarian rower.

Yordanov was born in Dupnitsa in 1967. He won a gold medal at the 1987 World Rowing Championships in Copenhagen partnered with Vasil Radev in the men's double sculls. Radev and Yordanov competed at the 1988 Summer Olympics in Seoul in double sculls where they came eighth.
