= Ōtūmoetai College =

Secondary school located in New Zealand

Location
- Windsor Road; Otumoetai; Tauranga; New Zealand; 37.6797°S 176.1295°E

Information
- Funding type: State
- Motto: Doctrina Vitam Illuminet; Let Learning Enlighten Life; He Akonga te Oranga
- Established: 1965
- Ministry of Education Institution no.: 120
- Principal: Russell Gordon
- Years offered: 9–13
- Gender: Co-educational
- Enrolment: 2,002 (July 2026)
- Socio-economic decile: 7O
- Website: www.otc.school.nz

Ōtūmoetai College is a state co-educational secondary school located in Tauranga, New Zealand. The school opened in February 1965 with 206 students from years 9 to 13 (ages 12 to 18) to serve the western suburbs of Tauranga. Ōtūmoetai is claimed to stand for "peaceful waters" implied by the peaceful surroundings and estuary within the Ōtūmoetai area.

In July 2026, Ōtūmoetai College had a roll of 2,002 students, making it the largest school in the Bay of Plenty Region.

== History ==
At the turn of the 20th century, the land on which the school stands was farmed by a young Englishman named Mr. Tollemache.

Ōtūmoetai College opened in February 1965. Like many New Zealand secondary schools of the era, it was designed and constructed to the Nelson Two-Storey standard plan. The plan is distinguished by its two-storey H-shaped classroom blocks, with stairwells at each end of the block and a large ground floor toilet and cloak area on one side. The school has three of these blocks – D, F and G blocks. G block (originally D block), was completed ready for the school opening in 1965; F block was completed in two stages in 1967 and 1968; and D block (originally G block) was completed in two stages in 1969 and 1973. In the early 2000s, the school modified the blocks from their original design by converting the toilet and cloak areas into additional classrooms, and moving the stairs outside the buildings and converting the original stairwells into storage.

Since then, Ōtūmoetai College has undergone many changes in appearance, including the "opening of the swimming pool complex, which was a joint venture with the Tauranga City Council" in 1968 as well as the long-awaited completion of the library block in September 1968. 1977 was seen as a stressful year for Ōtūmoetai College and especially Harold Webber who was apprehensive about the growing number of students at Ōtūmoetai and the fact that the number of temporary on-site classrooms had risen to a deplorable twelve.

Like numerous other schools in New Zealand, 2002 was a big year in the way of changes to the educational standards. National Certificate in Educational Achievement (NCEA) replaced School Certificate which led to a major disturbance with students, teachers and the unfamiliarity of the new concepts.

Today, Ōtūmoetai College can be seen to prosper from the changes it has had in the past to become one of the top leading schools within New Zealand.

== Ōtūmoetai College motto ==
The Ōtūmoetai school motto is detailed within the school emblem which is found on the uniform and in numerous places around the school. "It was designed by Mr F Graham and embodies three concepts." The aphorism "Doctrina Vitam Illuminet" means "let learning enlighten life" and symbolises the idea that education is not only a process of gaining qualifications and going through ones paces day by day in the effort to gain a job or career but "one which should bring us wisdom and so improve the quality of our lives and of the world in which we live". The emblem has three concepts or symbols; the torch with its red flame, the star beneath the torch and the silver waves on the dark blue background, each symbolising and holding its own meaning.

"The silver torch with its red flame standing on a forest green background, depicts the light of learning to be kept burning and handed on from generation to generation. The star beneath the torch is the heraldic recognition of Otumoetai as the third college in the community, and the silver waves on the dark blue background represent the quiet waters of the estuary near the college."

== Enrolment ==
At the August 2013 Education Review Office (ERO) review, Ōtūmoetai College had 1,924 students enrolled, including 71 international students. Forty-five percent of students were male and 55 percent were female. Sixty-three percent of students identified as European (Pākehā), three percent as another European ethnicity, 20 percent as Māori, six percent as Pasifika, four percent as Asian, and four percent as another ethnicity.

As of July 2026, Otumoetai College has roll of 2,002 students, of which 455 (22.7%) identify as Māori.

As of 2026, the school has an Equity Index of 451, placing it amongst schools whose students have average socioeconomic barriers to achievement (roughly equivalent to deciles 5 and 6 under the former socio-economic decile system).

== Principals ==
Harold Webber was the first principal appointed at Ōtūmoetai College in 1964. At that stage Ōtūmoetai College was still a piece of land waiting to become a complete collection of buildings and educational blocks, for the first roll of students arriving and starting in 1965. Previously, Webber had been principal at Paeroa College. Webber remained principal until 1970.

The second principal was Alastair Murray, who took up the position in 1971. Like Webber, Murray had had numerous years' experience as a deputy principal in a city school and as the principal of the Bay of Islands College. Murray left in 1983.

In June 1983, Peter Malcom was elected as the third principal of Ōtūmoetai College. Malcom came from a strong experienced background within schools. Originally from Ashburton College, he was considered a great mathematician. He brought numerous changes and great things to Ōtūmoetai College and retired in July 2000.

In June 2000, Dave Randell was elected as the fourth principal of Ōtūmoetai College. Previously, he had been principal at Taihape College in 1988 as well Melville High School in Hamilton from 1995. In late 2017, Randell announced his retirement. In 2018, he was followed by Russell Gordon who had been principal at Mount Maunganui College.

== Ōtūmoetai musical and drama productions ==
Over the past 45 years Ōtūmoetai College has taken great pride in presenting numerous musical and drama productions to the Tauranga community. Thousands of students and teachers have dedicated many hours and been heavily involved in frequent productions staged by the school. "The first concert took place in the college hall on the evening of 18 August 1965 under the direction of Mrs Bartlett." Since then, the school has flourished and expanded its growing ideas and passions for dance, drama and performing, leading to numerous presentations for the community at Bay Court, the local performance centre in Tauranga.

=== Musical productions ===
- 1992 Oliver
- 1993 Fiddler on the Roof
- 1994 Chess
- 1996 Grease
- 1999 The Sound of Music
- 2000 The Buddy Holly Story
- 2001 Blood Brothers
- 2002 My Fair Lady
- 2004 Return to the Forbidden Planet
- 2005 Fame
- 2007 High School Musical
- 2008 Charlie and the Chocolate Factory
- 2009 Jekyll and Hyde
- 2011 Footloose
- 2012 Alice in Wonderland
- 2014 Guys and Dolls
- 2016 Hairspray
- 2018 Annie
- 2019 High School Musical
- 2021 School Of Rock
- 2023 Spongebob: The Musical
- 2025 Mama Mia!

=== Drama productions ===
- 1984 A Midsummer Night's Dream
- 1992 Whose Life is it Anyway?
- 1993 Teachers
- 1994 The Secret Diary of Adrian Mole
- 1999 The Diary of Anne Frank
- 2001 Cosi
- 2002 An Evening with Molière
- 2006 Stepping Out
- 2008 Charlie and the Chocolate Factory / Our Day Out
- 2010 The Golden Pathway Annual / Daisy's Disastrous Daydreams
- 2012 Footloose
- 2014 Guys and Dolls
- 2016 Hairspray
- 2018 Annie

== Notable alumni ==
- Tim Balme (born 1967), actor, director and screenwriter, known for roles in the long running TV soap Shortland Street, the Peter Jackson movie Braindead and writer of the TV series Brokenwood Mysteries
- Gary Braid (born 1960), rugby union player, member of All Blacks
- Moss Burmester (born 1981), swimmer, Commonwealth games gold medallist
- Samantha Charlton (born 1991), field hockey player, member of Black Sticks Women
- Allan Horan (born 1961), Olympic rower
- Geoff Horan (born 1960), Olympic rower
- Glen Jackson (born 1975), rugby union player and referee
- Tony Lochhead (born 1982), football (soccer) player, member of All Whites
- Peter Stafford (born 1978), field hockey player, member of Black Sticks Men, Commonwealth Games silver medallist
- Trent Boult (born 1989), member of New Zealand national cricket team
- Janika ter Ellen, television broadcaster and news presenter for Prime News
- Augusta Xu-Holland (born 1989), actor, known for her role in the movie On Wings of Eagles.
