= Mauro Jagodnich =

Italian rower

Personal information
- Nationality: Italian
- Born: 11 July 1967 (age 57)

Sport
- Sport: Rowing

Mauro Jagodnich (born 11 July 1967) is an Italian rower. He competed in the men's double sculls event at the 1988 Summer Olympics.
