= Glenn Florio =

American rower (1967–2020)

Personal information
- Nationality: American
- Born: January 26, 1967
- Died: October 26, 2020 (aged 53)

Sport
- Sport: Rowing

Glenn Florio (January 26, 1967 – October 26, 2020) was an American rower. In 1986, he captured a bronze medal in the lightweight single sculls event at the World Rowing Championships in Nottingham, England. In the same year, competing for Fordham University, he won the National Collegiate Championship in the single scull on the Schuylkill River in Philadelphia, Pennsylvania. He later competed in the men's double sculls event at the 1988 Summer Olympics.

He died of an apparent heart attack on October 26, 2020.
