= Peter Klug-Andersen =

Danish rower (born c. 1958)

Sport
- Sport: Rowing
Medal record
Men's rowing
Representing Denmark
World Rowing Championships
Gold medal – first place	1981 Munich	Lwt eight

Peter Klug-Andersen is a Danish coxswain. He won a gold medal at the 1981 World Rowing Championships in Munich with the lightweight men's eight.
