= Pantelis Papaterpos =

Greek rower (born 1968)

Personal information
- Nationality: Greek
- Born: 18 March 1968 (age 58)

Sport
- Sport: Rowing
Medal record
Representing Greece
Summer Universiade
Bronze medal – third place	1989 Duisburg	Double sculls

Pantelis Papaterpos (born 18 March 1968) is a Greek rower. He competed in the men's double sculls event at the 1988 Summer Olympics.
