= Margerita Kokarevitch =

Soviet rower

Medal record
Women's rowing
World Rowing Championships
Representing Soviet Union
Gold medal – first place	1981 Munich	Double sculls

Margerita Kokarevitch is a Soviet rower. Alongside Antonina Zelikovich, she became world champion in the women's double scull at the 1981 World Rowing Championships in Oberschleißheim outside Munich, Germany.
