= Sverre Løken =

Norwegian rower (born 1960)

Medal record

Representing Norway

Men's Rowing

Olympic Games
Bronze medal – third place	1984 Los Angeles	Coxless pair

World Rowing Championships
Gold medal – first place	1982 Lucerne	Coxless pair

Sverre Bertrand Løken (born 27 July 1960) is a former Norwegian competition rower and Olympic medalist.

He received a bronze medal in coxless pairs at the 1984 Summer Olympics in Los Angeles, together with Hans Magnus Grepperud. He also won the coxless pair World Championship gold at the 1982 event in Luzerne, Switzerland.

After his athletic career, he trained as a physician, specializing in both general and orthopedic surgery. He is currently practicing sports medicine and is regarded as one of Norway's premier specialists on sports injuries. He works and researches at the Center of Sports Injury Research at the Oslo University Hospital (formerly Ullevål). Løken defended his PhD thesis on the subject of knee cartilage injuries in 2010.
