= Allan Horan =

New Zealand rower

Personal information
- Born: Allan Douglas Horan; 12 May 1961 (age 65)
- Height: 188 cm (6 ft 2 in)
- Weight: 81 kg (179 lb)
- Relative: Geoff Horan (brother)

Sport
- Sport: Rowing

Allan Douglas "Jack" Horan (born 12 May 1961) is an Olympian oarsman who competed at the 1984 Summer Olympics as a representative of New Zealand.

== Life ==
Horan was born in 1961 in Te Awamutu. His family left Te Awamutu for Tauranga. During attendance at Otumoetai College, he began his rowing career. He had his first podium placement in the Springbok Shield (U18 coxed four), at the Maadi Cup regatta in 1977, where his team came second. At the 1978 Maadi Cup, his coxed four won the competition. After finishing college he returned to live in Te Awamutu and joined the Waikato Rowing Club, based at Lake Karapiro. As of 2003 he lived in Cambridge, New Zealand.

Horan represented New Zealand in the coxless pair, with brother Geoff Horan, at the 1984 Summer Olympics in Los Angeles. They came ninth in the competition.

== Career highlights ==
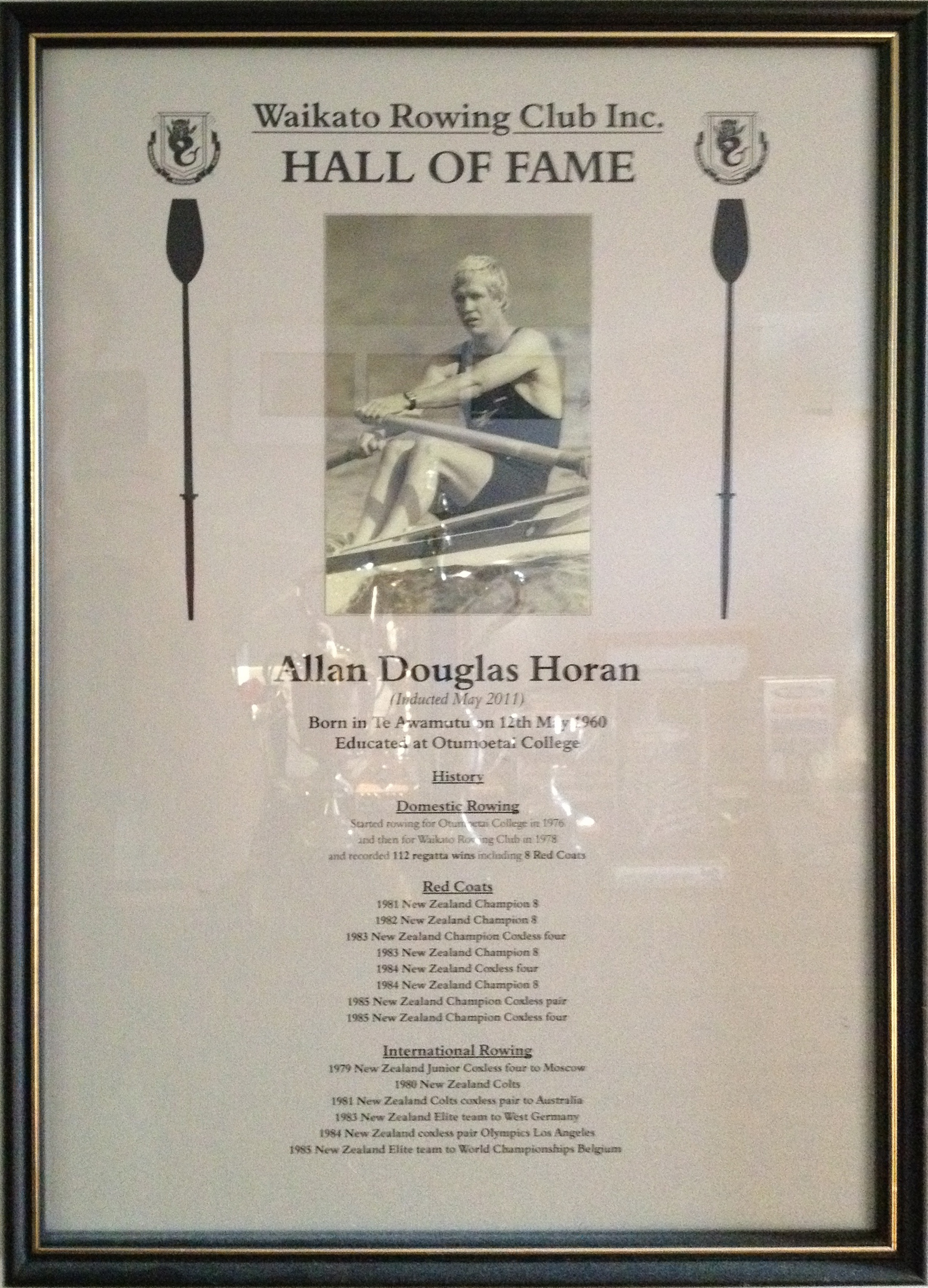

- 1979: After successes at club level, he was selected for the NZ junior team for the World Championships in Moscow. Overall placed 7th in the coxless four event.
- 1980: He gained a first win in a national premier event at age 18. represented NZ in the NZ Colt's team against Australia. They won the series 3 nil.
- 1981: He was selected for the NZ Colt's team again.
- 1982: He gained a trial selection for the world championship NZ men's eight. He was unsuccessful that year; however the men's eight crew went on to win gold in Lucerne, Switzerland.
- 1983: He was selected as reserve for the eight and competed in the men's heavyweight single sculls at the World Championships in Duisburg, West Germany. He gained a world ranking of 11th for that year.
- 1984: He was selected in the men's coxless pair for the Los Angeles Olympic Games, gaining a final placing of 7th.
- 1985: He was selected for the men's elite eight team for the World Championships in Hazewinkel, Belgium. The crew were placed fourth in the final with 5min 36.64 seconds. Only 2.93 seconds behind first place.
- 1986: He retired from active competition, after gaining 8 National elite titles (red coats).
- 2011: He was inducted into the Waikato Rowing Hall of Fame.
- 2022 : Inducted into New Zealand Amateur Rowing Assoc Legacy Medal presentation, Athlete number 148.
