= Alfred Fischer (rower) =

Swiss rower

Personal information
- Nationality: Swiss
- Born: 16 February 1960 (age 65)

Sport
- Sport: Rowing

Alfred Fischer (born 16 February 1960) is a Swiss rower. He competed in the men's coxless pair event at the 1984 Summer Olympics.
