= Jorma Lehtelä =

Finnish rower

Personal information
- Nationality: Finnish
- Born: 14 February 1963 (age 62); Valkeakoski, Finland

Sport
- Sport: Rowing

Jorma Lehtelä (born 14 February 1963) is a Finnish rower. He competed in the men's double sculls event at the 1988 Summer Olympics.
