= Konstantinos Ditsios =

Greek rower (born 1964)

Personal information
- Nationality: Greek
- Born: 1964 (age 61–62)

Sport
- Sport: Rowing
Medal record
Representing Greece
Summer Universiade
Bronze medal – third place	1989 Duisburg	Double sculls

Konstantinos Ditsios (born 1964) is a Greek rower. He competed in the men's double sculls event at the 1988 Summer Olympics.
