= Luis María Lasúrtegui =

Spanish rower

Personal information
- Full name: Luis María Lasúrtegui Berridi
- Born: 28 March 1956 (age 70) Pasaia, Guipúzcoa, Spain
Medal record
Men's rowing
Representing Spain
Olympic Games
Silver medal – second place	1984 Los Angeles	Coxless pair
World Championships
Bronze medal – third place	1985 Hazewinkel	Coxless pair

Luis María Lasúrtegui Berridi (Note: In this Spanish name, the first or paternal surname is Lasúrtegui and the second or maternal family name is Berridi.) (born 28 March 1956 in Pasaia, Guipúzcoa) is a Spanish competition rower and Olympic medalist.

He won a silver medal in the coxless pair event at the 1984 Summer Olympics in Los Angeles, together with Fernando Climent.

== See also ==
- List of Basques
