= Axel Wöstmann =

German rower

Personal information
- Nationality: German
- Born: 12 April 1961 (age 63); Osnabrück, Germany

Sport
- Sport: Rowing

Axel Wöstmann (born 12 April 1961) is a German rower. He competed in the men's coxless pair event at the 1984 Summer Olympics.
