= Valentino Tontodonati =

Italian rower

Personal information
- Born: 14 November 1959 (age 66) Pescara, Italy
- Height: 1.80 m (5 ft 11 in)
- Weight: 71 kg (157 lb)

Sport
- Sport: Rowing
Medal record
Men's rowing
Representing Italy
World Rowing Championships
| Gold medal – first place | 1982 Lucerne | Lwt eight |

Valentino Tontodonati (born 14 November 1959) is an Italian lightweight rower. He won a gold medal at the 1982 World Rowing Championships in Lucerne with the lightweight men's eight.
