= Pat Walter =

Canadian rower

Personal information
- Born: February 16, 1959 (age 66); Calgary, Alberta, Canada

Sport
- Sport: Rowing

Pat Walter (born February 16, 1959) is a Canadian rower. He competed in the men's double sculls event at the 1988 Summer Olympics.
