= Steffi Götzelt =

East German rower

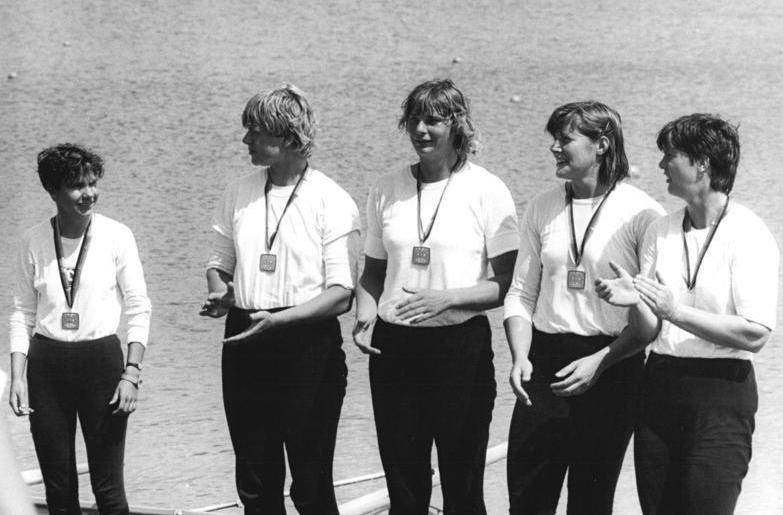
- Götzelt (second from right) in 1985

Personal information
- Born: 19 September 1960 (age 65) Dresden, Germany
- Height: 1.83 m (6 ft 0 in)
- Weight: 84 kg (185 lb)

Sport
- Sport: Rowing
- Club: Einheit Dresden SC
Medal record
Women's rowing
Representing East Germany
World Rowing Championships
Bronze medal – third place	1982 Lucerne	Eight
Bronze medal – third place	1983 Duisburg	Eight
Gold medal – first place	1985 Hazewinkel	Coxed four

Steffi Götzelt (born 19 September 1960) is a retired East German rower. She won a world title in the coxed fours in 1985 and two bronze medals in the women's eight in 1981–1982. In October 1986, she was awarded a Patriotic Order of Merit in gold (first class) for her sporting success.
