= José Manuel Bermúdez =

Spanish rower

Personal information
- Nationality: Spanish
- Born: 22 February 1958 (age 67); Vigo, Spain

Sport
- Sport: Rowing

José Manuel Bermúdez García (born 22 February 1958) is a Spanish rower. He competed at the 1980, 1984, 1988 and the 1992 Summer Olympics.
