= 1981 World Rowing Championships =

International rowing event

- Venue: Oberschleißheim Regatta Course
- Location: Oberschleißheim near Munich, West Germany
- Dates: 30 August to 6 September

The 1981 World Rowing Championships were World Rowing Championships that were held from 30 August to 6 September 1981 at Oberschleißheim Regatta Course in Oberschleißheim near Munich, West Germany.

== Medal summary ==
=== Men's events ===
Event:	Gold:	Time	Silver:	Time	Bronze:	Time
M1x	West Germany; Peter-Michael Kolbe	7:45.32	East Germany; Rüdiger Reiche	7:48.90	United States; John Biglow	7:51.55
M2x	East Germany; Klaus Kröppelien (b); Joachim Dreifke (s)	6:41.99	Finland; Reima Karppinen (b); Pertti Karppinen (s)	6:44.06	Norway; Rolf Thorsen (b); Alf Hansen (s)	6:44.61
M4x	East Germany; Peter Kersten (b); Karl-Heinz Bußert (2); Uwe Heppner (3); Martin Winter (s)	6:11.37	Soviet Union; Igor Yarkov (b); Sergey Shevchenko (2); Vladimir Koldishkin (3); Aleksandr Sdravomislov (s)	6:14.58	France; Denis Gaté (b); Jean-Raymond Peltier (2); Charles Imbert (3); Marc Boudoux (s)	6:17.45
M2+	Italy; Carmine Abbagnale (b); Giuseppe Abbagnale (s); Giuseppe Di Capua (c)	7:43.73	East Germany; Karsten Schmeling (b); Jürgen Seyfarth (s); Hendrik Reiher (c)	7:46.22	Great Britain; Tom Cadoux-Hudson (b); Richard Budgett (s); Adrian Ellison (c)	7:47.03
M2-	Soviet Union; Yuriy Pimenov (b); Nikolay Pimenov (s)	7:15.06	Netherlands; Willem Jan Atsma (b); Ted Bosman (s)	7:20.04	Italy; Antonio Baldacci (b); Ezio Pacovich (s) (s)	7:23.28
M4+	East Germany; Dietmar Schiller (b); Jörg Friedrich (2); Bernd Niesecke (3); Harald Jährling (s); Klaus-Dieter Ludwig (c)	6:36.88	United States; Andrew Sudduth (b); Thomas Woodman (2); John Everett (3); Fred Borchelt (s); Robert Jaugstetter (c)	6:39.68	Soviet Union; Viktor Omelyanovich (b); Dimants Krišjānis (2); Dzintars Krišjānis (3); Dzorzes Tikmers (s); Juris Bērziņš (c)	6:40.52
M4-	Soviet Union; Aleksey Kamkin (b); Valeriy Dolinin (2); Aleksandr Kulagin (3); Vitaliy Eliseyev (s)	6:35.85	Switzerland; Bruno Saile (b); Jürg Weitnauer (2); Hans-Konrad Trümpler (3); Stefan Netzle (s)	6:41.47	East Germany; Klaus Büttner (b); Hans-Peter Koppe (2); Jens Doberschütz (3); Uwe Gasch (s)	6:43.07
M8+	Soviet Union; Zigmas Gudauskas (b); Nikolai Solomakhin (2); Vladimir Krilov (3); Viktor Diduk (4); Stasys Narušaitis (5); Jonas Narmontas (6); Jonas Pinskus (7); Ihar Maystrenka (s); Vladimir Nizhegorodov (c)	6:02.30	Great Britain; Mark Andrews (b); John Bland (2); Colin Seymour (3); Christopher Mahoney (4); Andrew Justice (5); John Pritchard (6); Malcolm McGowan (7); Richard Stanhope (s); Colin Moynihan (c)	6:04.31	United States; Daniel Lyons (b); John Zevenbergen (2); Thomas Kiefer (3); James McDougall (4); John Phinney (5); Dave Clark (6); Charles Clapp (7); Matthew Labine (s); Seth Bauer (c)	6:06.13
Lightweight events
LM1x	United States; Scott Roop	7:22.90	Austria; Raimund Haberl	7:25.30	Canada; Brian Thorne	7:27.16
LM2x	Italy; Francesco Esposito (b); Ruggero Verroca (s)	6:42.17	United States; Paul Fuchs Jr (b); William Belden Sr (s)	6:44.22	Denmark; Leif Kruse (b); Bjarne Eltang (s)	6:48.95
LM4-	Australia; Graham Gardiner (b); Charles Bartlett (2); Clyde Hefer (3); Simon Gillett (s)	6:22.32	Netherlands; Peter Van Berkel (b); Richard Helsloot (2); Willem Appeldoorn (3); Paul Paulsen (s)	6:24.04	Canada; Timothy Turner (b); Edward Gibson (2); Jim Relle (3); Patrick Turner (s)	6:26.60
LM8+	Denmark; Torben Knudsen; Jan Jensen; Ivar Mølgaard; Arne Højlund; Søren Hansson; Søren Eriksen; Mikael Espersen; Bent Fransson; Peter Klug-Andersen (c)	5:58.41	Italy; Franco Pantano; Mauro Torta; Romano Uberti; Lauro Zettin; Renzo Borsini; Lanfranco Borsini; Claudio Castiglioni; Leonardo Salani; Davide Lanza (c)	5:59.05	Spain; Fernando Climent; Luis Arteaga Leon; Carlos Sáez Bernardos; José Antonio Expósito Sánchez; Francisco Goicoechea García; Guillermo Müller Gascón; Alberto Molina Castillo; José Marti Miranda; Fernando Macho (c)	6:01.03

=== Women's events ===
Event:	Gold:	Time	Silver:	Time	Bronze:	Time
W1x	Romania; Sanda Toma	3:54.46	Great Britain; Beryl Mitchell	3:55.58	Soviet Union; Irina Fetisova	3:56.99
W2x	Soviet Union; Margerita Kokarevitch; Antonina Zelikovich	3:40.65	East Germany; Kerstin Kirst; Jutta Hampe	3:30.11	Bulgaria; Iskra Velinova; Anka Bakova	3:30.21
W4x+	Soviet Union; Tatyana Danilova; Olga Kaspina; Yelena Khloptseva; Larisa Popova; Maria Zemskova-Korotkova (c)	3:19.83	East Germany; Heidi Westphal; Birka Brandt-Fengler; Cornelia Linse; Jutta Ploch; Jenny Gerber (c)	3:21.65	Romania; Aneta Mihaly; Valeria Răcilă; Sofia Corban; Olga Homeghi; Ecaterina Oancia (c)	3:22.89
W2-	East Germany; Iris Rudolph; Sigrid Anders	3:45.50	Canada; Elizabeth Craig; Tricia Smith	3:45.77	Romania; Rodica Arba; Elena Horvat	3:50.45
W4+	Soviet Union; Olga Pivovarova; Marina Studneva; Svetlana Semyonova; Raisa Doligoiada; Nina Cheremisina (c)	3:18.75	East Germany; Viola Kestler; Silvia Fröhlich-Arndt; Marita Sandig-Gasch; Romy Saalfeld; Kirsten Wenzel (c)	3:23.95	United States; Susan Tuttle; Hope Barnes; Shyril O'Steen; Harriet Metcalf; Nanette Bernadou (c)	3:27.35
W8+	Soviet Union; Regina Baltutite; Irina Teterina; Elena Tereshina; Nataliya Yatsenko; Elena Makushkina; Tatyana Shvetsova; Nina Umanets; Maria Paziun; Nina Frolova (c)	3:07.58	United States; Carol Bower; Carol Brown; Jeanne Flanagan; Patricia Spratlin; Kristine Norelius; Carie Graves; Elizabeth Hills-O'Leary; Liz Miles; Valerie McClain-Ward (c)	3:10.32	Romania; Rodica Frîntu; Florica Bucur; Luminata Furcila; Maricica Țăran; Cristina Onofrei; Maria Naghiu; Mariana Zaharia; Elena Bondar; Elena Dobrițoiu (c)	3:14.05

== Medal table ==
Platz	Land	Gold	Silber	Bronze	Total
1	Soviet Union	7	1	2	10
2	East Germany	4	5	1	10
3	Italy	2	1	1	4
4	United States	1	3	3	7
5	Romania	1		3	4
6	Denmark	1		1	2
7	Australia	1			1
7	West Germany	1			1
9	Great Britain		2	1	3
10	Netherlands		2		2
11	Canada		1	2	3
12	Austria		1		1
12	Finland		1		1
12	Switzerland		1		1
15	Bulgaria			1	1
15	Spain			1	1
15	France			1	1
15	Norway			1	1
Summe		18	18	18	54
