= Jürgen Seyfarth =

German rower

Medal record

Men's rowing

Representing East Germany

World Rowing Championships
Silver medal – second place	1981 Munich	M2-
Silver medal – second place	1982 Luzern	M2+
Silver medal – second place	1983 Duisburg	M8+

Jürgen Seyfarth (born 20 July 1962) is a German rower, who competed for the SG Dynamo Potsdam / Sportvereinigung (SV) Dynamo. He won the medals at international rowing competitions.
