= Jan Jensen (rower) =

Danish rower

Sport
- Sport: Rowing
Medal record
Men's rowing
Representing Denmark
World Rowing Championships
Gold medal – first place	1981 Munich	Lwt eight

Jan Jensen is a Danish lightweight rower. He won a gold medal at the 1981 World Rowing Championships in Munich with the lightweight men's eight.
