= Roberto Fusaro =

Italian rower

Personal information
- Nationality: Italian
- Born: 7 July 1968 (age 58) Venice, Italy

Sport
- Sport: Rowing
Medal record
Representing Italy
Mediterranean Games
Gold medal – first place	1991 Athens	Single sculls
Summer Universiade
Silver medal – second place	1989 Duisburg	Double sculls

Roberto Fusaro (born 7 July 1968) is an Italian rower. He competed in the men's double sculls event at the 1988 Summer Olympics.
