= Elena Makushkina =

Russian rower

Elena Makushkina is a retired Russian rower. She was world champion in the women's eight for three consecutive seasons starting at the 1981 World Rowing Championships in Munich.
