= Jim Relle =

Canadian rower

Personal information
- Born: 10 June 1961 (age 63); Toronto, Ontario, Canada

Sport
- Sport: Rowing

Jim Relle (born 10 June 1961) is a Canadian rower. He competed in the men's coxless pair event at the 1984 Summer Olympics. He competed at Harvard University.
