= Reima Karppinen =

Finnish rower

Personal information
- Born: 27 January 1958 (age 68) Vehmaa, Finland
- Height: 1.93 m (6 ft 4 in)
- Weight: 88–90 kg (194–198 lb)

Sport
- Sport: Rowing
- Club: Nesteen Soutajat, Naantali
Medal record
Representing Finland
World Rowing Championships
Silver medal – second place	1981 Munich	Double sculls

Reima Juhani Karppinen (born 27 January 1958) is a retired Finnish rower who specialized in the double sculls. In this event, he won a silver medal at the 1981 World Rowing Championships, together with his legendary brother Pertti. He competed at the 1984, 1988 and 1992 Summer Olympics, with other partners, and finished in 8th, 12th and 13th place, respectively.
