= Valer Toma =

Romanian rower

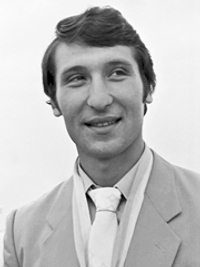

Personal information
- Born: 26 November 1957 (age 68) Padina, Buzău, Romania
- Height: 187 cm (6 ft 2 in)
- Weight: 88 kg (194 lb)

Sport
- Sport: Rowing
Medal record
Representing Romania
Olympic Games
Gold medal – first place	1984 Los Angeles	Coxless pair
World Rowing Championships
Bronze medal – third place	1982 Lucerne	Coxless four

Valeriu "Valer" Toma (born 26 November 1957) is a retired Romanian rower. Competing in coxless pairs he won a gold medal at the 1984 Olympics, placing fourth in 1980. He also won a bronze medal in coxless fours at the 1982 World Championships.
