= Lanfranco Borsini =

Italian lightweight rower

Sport
- Sport: Rowing
Medal record
Men's rowing
Representing Italy
World Championships
Gold medal – first place	1982 Lucerne	Lwt eight
Silver medal – second place	1981 Munich	Lwt men's eight

Lanfranco Borsini is an Italian lightweight rower. He won a gold medal at the 1982 World Rowing Championships in Lucerne with the lightweight men's eight.
