= Leonardo Salani =

Italian rower

Personal information
- Height: 179 cm (5 ft 10 in)
- Weight: 70 kg (154 lb)

Sport
- Sport: Rowing
Medal record
Men's rowing
Representing Italy
World Championships
Gold medal – first place	1982 Lucerne	Lwt eight
Silver medal – second place	1981 Munich	Lwt eight

Leonardo Salani is an Italian lightweight rower. He won a gold medal at the 1982 World Rowing Championships in Lucerne with the lightweight men's eight.
