= Ralf Thienel =

West German rower (1959–1995)

Medal record

Men's rowing

Representing West Germany

World Rowing Championships
Silver medal – second place	1987 Copenhagen	M2x

Ralf Thienel (29 May 1959 – 1 August 1995) was a West German rower. Together with Christian Händle he finished 4th in the double scull at the 1988 Summer Olympics.
