= Christian Händle =

German rower

Medal record

Men's rowing

Representing Germany

World Rowing Championships
| Silver medal – second place | 1994 Indianapolis | M2x |
| Bronze medal – third place | 1993 Račice | M2x |

Christian Händle (born 13 May 1965 in Marburg) is a German rower. Together with Ralf Thienel he finished 4th in the double scull at the 1988 Summer Olympics. He is married to rower Birgit Peter.
