= Nico Rienks =

Dutch rower (born 1962)

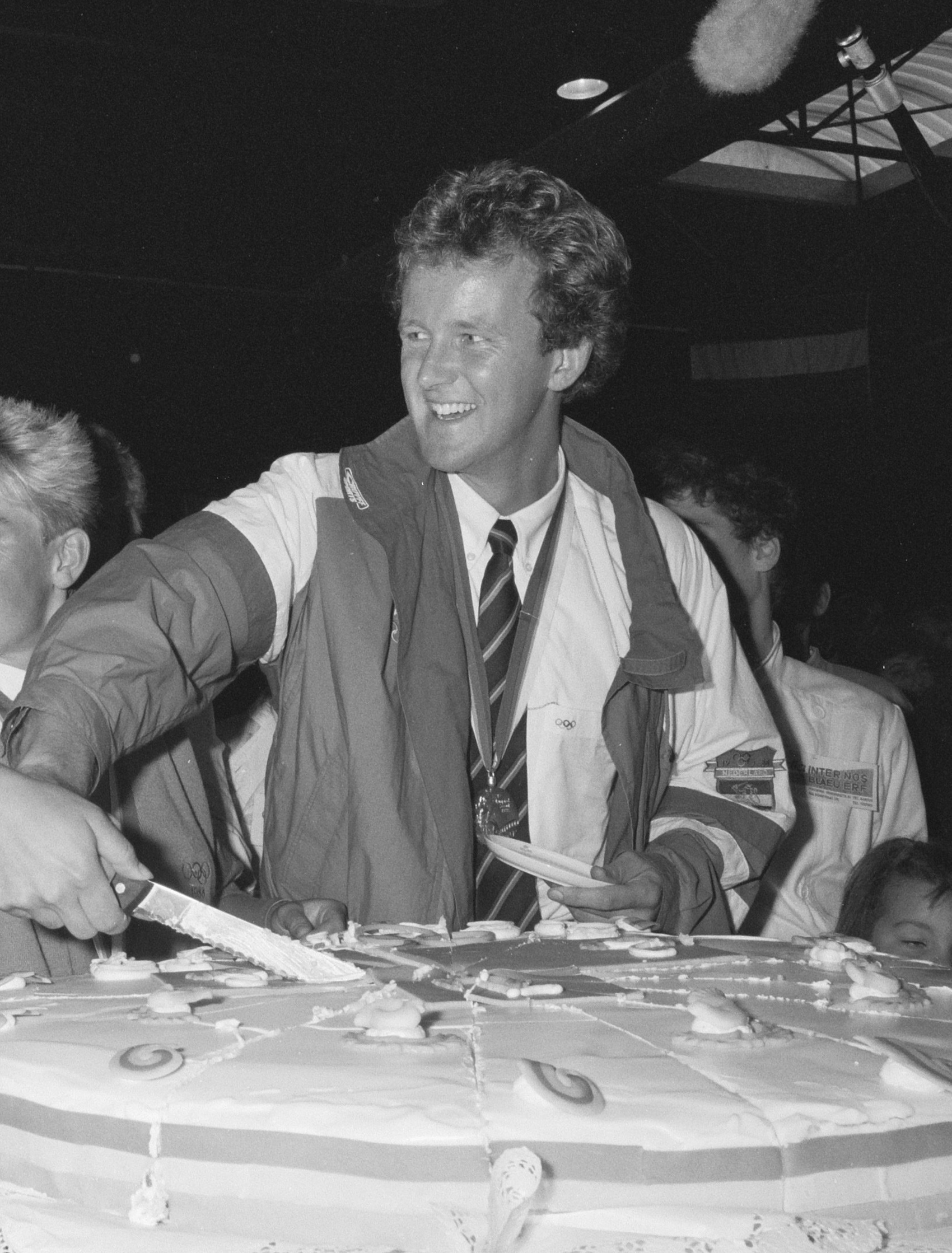
- Rienks in 1988

Personal information
- Born: 1 February 1962 (age 64) Tiel, the Netherlands
- Height: 1.96 m (6 ft 5 in)
- Weight: 96 kg (212 lb)

Sport
- Sport: Rowing
- Club: Okeanos, Amsterdam
Medal record
Representing the Netherlands
Olympic Games
Gold medal – first place	1988 Seoul	Double scull
Gold medal – first place	1996 Atlanta	Eight with coxswain
Bronze medal – third place	1992 Barcelona	Double scull
World Championships
Gold medal – first place	1991 Vienna	Double sculls
Silver medal – second place	1989 Lake Bled	Double sculls
Silver medal – second place	1994 Tampere	Eight
Silver medal – second place	1995 Indianapolis	Eight

Nicolaas "Nico" Hessel Rienks (born 1 February 1962) is a former rower from the Netherlands and two-time Olympic gold medallist.

Rienks won the gold medal in the men's double sculls at the 1988 Summer Olympics, alongside Ronald Florijn. At the 1996 Summer Olympics, he repeated his gold medal performance winning the eight with coxswain event with the Holland Acht (Holland Eight). He also competed at the 1984 and 2000 Olympics but finished outside the podium.

With Henk-Jan Zwolle he won the gold medal in the double sculls competition at the 1991 World Rowing Championships. He also won three silver medals at the world championships in 1989 (double sculls), 1994 and 1995 (eights).

He was named 'Dutch Rower of the Century' and is an honorary member of the Dutch Rowing Federation. In 2004, Rienks was awarded the Thomas Keller Medal by the International Rowing Federation.

For the 2026 World Rowing Championships in Amsterdam, Rienks was appointed Regatta Director in a joint role together with former Olympic champion Ilse Paulis.

Olympic Games
Preceded by Anky van Grunsven	Flagbearer for Netherlands; 2000 Sydney	Succeeded by Mark Huizinga
