= Manuel Vásquez =

Dr. Manuel A. Vásquez
- Education: Georgetown University; Temple University
- Scientific career
- Fields: Religious Studies; Latin American Studies; Immigration; Social and Critical Theory
- Website: mavasquez.com

Manuel A. Vásquez is a prominent Salvadoran scholar of religion and society. As Andrew W. Mellon post-doctoral fellow at Wesleyan University's Center for the Americas and former faculty at the University of Florida, he has focused on the interplay between religion and globalization in the Americas, particularly in Latin America and among U.S. Latinos.

== Biography ==
Manuel A. Vásquez received his B.S. from Georgetown University and his M.A. and Ph.D. from Temple University. Vasquez's dissertation and first book, The Brazilian Popular Church and the Crisis of Modernity (Cambridge University Press 1998), focused on the impact of neo-liberal capitalism on grassroots progressive Catholicism in Brazil. The book received the 1998 award for excellence in the analytical-descriptive study of religion from the American Academy of Religion. More recently, Vasquez has co-directed (with Philip J. Williams) a series of studies, supported by the Pew Charitable Trusts and the Ford Foundation, on the role of religion in the process of migration, settlement, and integration among Latinos in new destinations in the U.S. South. In particular, he has explored how religious congregations grapple with the challenges posed by increasing racial and ethnic diversity and transnational immigration, both authorized and unauthorized. Vasquez has also contributed to the field of method and theory, advancing a "non-reductive materialism" that stresses the centrality of embodiment, emplacement, practice, and material culture in the study of religion. He argues that religions are hybrid and dynamic artifacts produced by complex relations among discursive matrices, and social, neural, and ecological networks.

In 2016, Vásquez pleaded no contest to video voyeurism for, according to an Alachua County Sheriff’s Office arrest report, secretly recording a teenage relative by placing a recording device in her closet. He subsequently resigned from his post as chair of the department of religion at the University of Florida.

== Works ==
- "The Persistence, Ubiquity, and Dynamicity of Materiality: Studying Religion and Materiality Comparatively," in The Wiley Blackwell Companion to Religion and Materiality, edited by V. Narayanan (London: Wiley Blackwell, 2020), 4-80.
- The Diaspora of Brazilian Religions (co-edited with Cristina Rocha) (Leiden: Brill, 2013), with a revised and updated edition in Portuguese by Ideias e Letras (2016)
- Living "Illegal:" The Human Face of Unauthorized Immigration (co-authored with Marie Friedmann Marquardt, Philip J. Williams, and Timothy J. Steigenga) (New Press, 2011), with a second, updated edition (2013)
- More than Belief: A Materialist Theory of Religion (Oxford University Press, 2010)
- A Place to Be: Brazilian, Guatemalan, and Mexican Immigrants in Florida's New Destinations (editor, with Philip J. Williams and Timothy J. Steigenga) (Rutgers University Press, 2009)
- Latin American Religions: Histories and Documents in Context (with Anna L. Peterson) (New York University Press 2008)
- Immigrant Faiths: Transforming Religious Life in America (editor, with Karen I. Leonard, Alex Stepick, and Jennifer Holdaway) (AltaMira Press 2005)
- Globalizing the Sacred: Religion Across the Americas (with Marie Friedmann Marquardt) (Rutgers University Press 2003)
- Christianity, Social Change, and Globalization in the Americas (editor, with Anna L. Peterson, and Philip J. Williams) (Rutgers University Press 2001)
- The Brazilian Popular Church and the Crisis of Modernity (Cambridge University Press 1998)

== Works with References to Manuel Vasquez ==
- Rethinking Religion in the Theatre of Grotowski (Routledge 2017)
- Religious Affects: Animality, Evolution, and Power (Duke 2015)
- Food, Sex, and Strangers: Understanding Religion as Everyday Life (Routledge, 2014)
- Performing Piety: Making Space Sacred with the Virgin of Guadalupe (University of California Press, 2011)
- Word Made Global: Stories of African Christianity in New York City (Eerdmans, 2011)
- Religion at the Corner of Bliss and Nirvana: Politics, Identity, and Faith in New Migrant Communities (Duke University Press, 2009)
- The Transnational Studies Reader: Intersections & Innovations (Rutledge 2008)
- American Religions and the Family: How Faith Traditions Cope with Modernization and Democracy (Columbia University Press 2006)
- The Marketplace of Christianity (MIT Press 2006)
- A Nation of Religions: The Politics of Pluralism in Multireligious America (University of North Carolina Press 2006)
- The Oxford Handbook of Religion and Ecology (Oxford University Press, USA 2006)
- Globalizing Theology: Belief and Practice in an Era of World Christianity (Baker Academic 2006)
- Latinos and the New Immigrant Church (Johns Hopkins University Press 2006)
- Handbook of Latina/o Theologies (Chalice Press 2006)
- Crossing and Dwelling: A Theory of Religion (Harvard University Press 2006)
