= Joost Adema =

Dutch rower (born 1959)

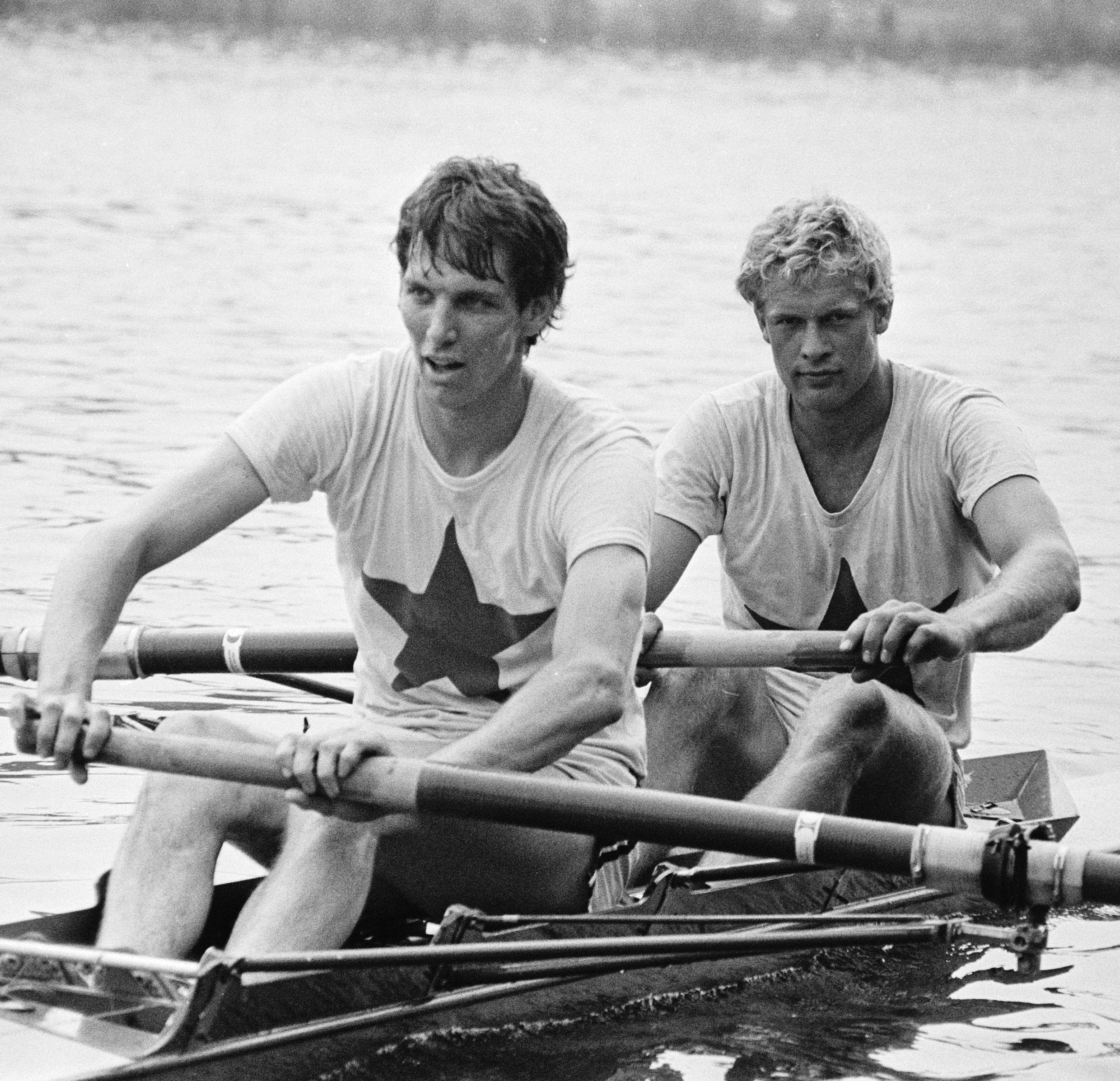
- Joost Adema (left) and Sjoerd Hoekstra in 1982

Personal information
- Born: 28 September 1959 (age 66) The Hague, the Netherlands
- Height: 2.02 m (6 ft 8 in)
- Weight: 91 kg (201 lb)

Sport
- Sport: Rowing
- Club: Aegir, Groningen
Medal record
Men's rowing
Representing the Netherlands
World Rowing Championships
Bronze medal – third place	1982 Lucerne	Coxless pairs

Joost Adema (born 28 September 1959) is a retired Dutch rower who specialized in the coxless pair. In this event, together with Sjoerd Hoekstra, he won a bronze medal at the 1982 World Rowing Championships and finished in seventh place at the 1984 Summer Olympics.
