= Dave De Ruff =

American rower

Personal information
- Born: April 10, 1961 (age 65) Santa Ana, California, United States

Sport
- Sport: Rowing

Dave De Ruff (born April 10, 1961) is an American rower. He competed in the men's coxless pair event at the 1984 Summer Olympics.
