= Magda Fusaro =

Canadian academic administrator

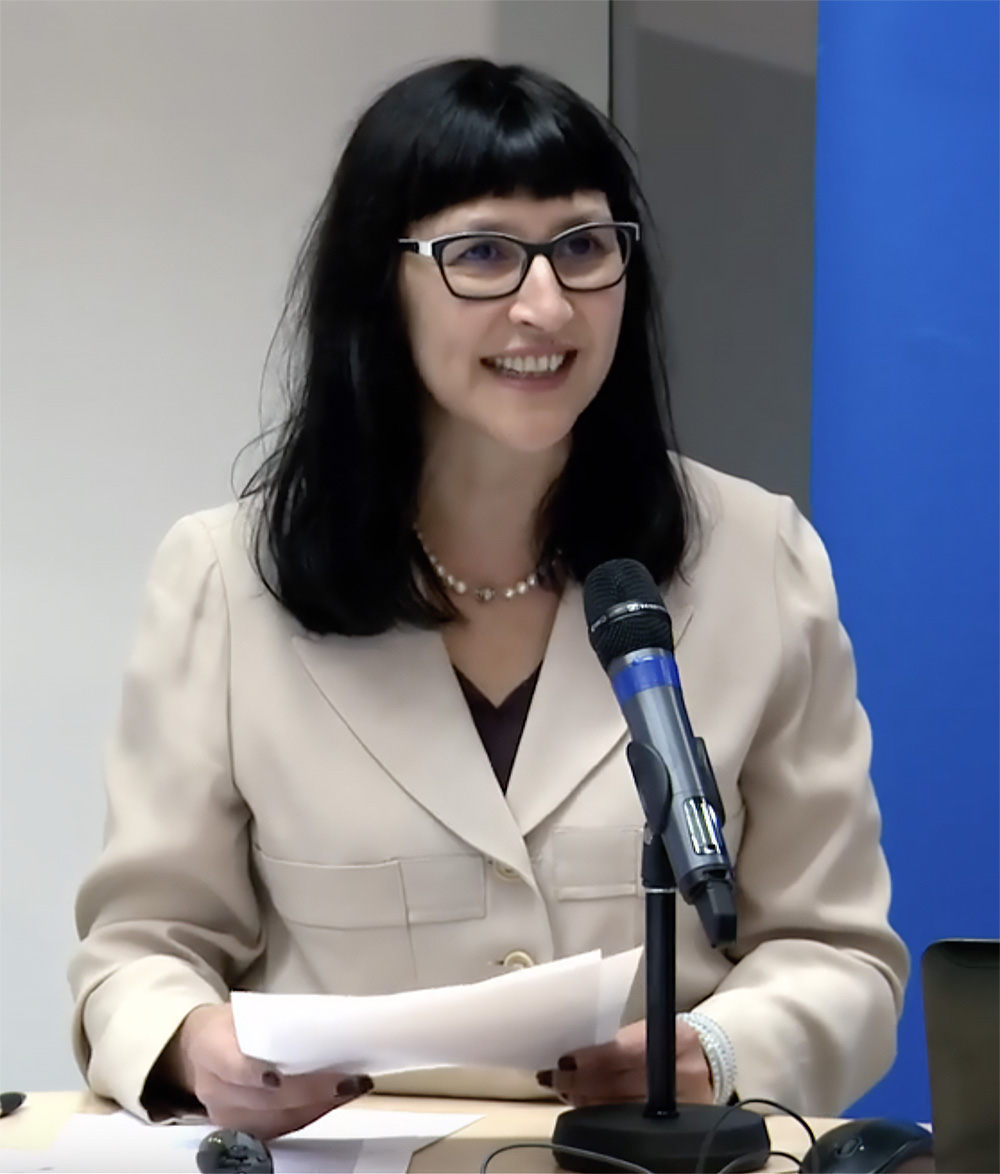
- Education: Université Sorbonne Paris Nord, Université du Québec à Montréal
- Occupation: Professor

Magda Fusaro is a university professor and academic administrator. From December 2006 to March 2018, she held the UNESCO Chair in Communication and Technologies for Development. In January 2018, she was appointed rector of the Université du Québec à Montréal (UQAM).

== Early life and education ==
Fusaro obtained a first master's degree in Communication Sciences and Techniques from the Université Sorbonne Paris Nord in 1992, followed by a second master's degree in communication from UQAM in 1994. One year later, in 1995, she completed a diploma of advanced studies in Cultural Industries and Information and Communication Politics from the Université Sorbonne Paris Nord. In 1999, she obtained her doctorate in Communication and Information Sciences from Université de Paris XIII.

== Career ==
Fusaro's first contact with the Université du Québec à Montréal was in 2001 as a research associate for the Réseau international des chaires UNESCO en communication. Her university teaching career began in 2006 at Université du Québec à Montréal in the Department of Management and Technology. Starting in 2006, she also held the UNESCO Chair in Communication and Technologies for Development. From 2008 to 2015, she directed the information technology programs in the Department of Management and Technology at the École des sciences de la gestion (UQAM's School of Management Sciences). From August 2016 until her appointment as rector in 2018, Fusaro held vice-rectorship of information systems at the Université du Québec à Montréal.
