= Bjarne Eltang =

Danish rower (1960–2023)

Medal record

Men's rowing

Representing Denmark

World Rowing Championships
Gold medal – first place	1983 Duisburg	LM1x
Gold medal – first place	1984 Montreal	LM1x
Silver medal – second place	1986 Nottingham	LM1x
Bronze medal – third place	1981 Munich	LM2x

Bjarne Eltang (27 July 1960 – 17 January 2023) was a Danish rower.

== Biography ==
He was born in Odense. Eltang won the world rowing championships in the lightweight single in 1983 and 1984. In 1986, Eltang won the Diamond Challenge Sculls (the premier singles sculls event) at the Henley Royal Regatta, rowing for the Danske Stud RK and defeating Steve Redgrave in the final.

Later that year Eltang lost by 0.02 seconds to Peter Antonie of Australia in the world championships lightweight singles final, taking Silver. At the 1988 Summer Olympics Eltang qualified for the open men's double sculls final, with Per Rasmussen, but did not medal.
