= Manuel Vera =

Spanish rower

Personal information
- Full name: Manuel Vera Vázquez
- National team: Spain
- Born: 13 October 1962 (age 63) Seville, Spain
- Height: 185 cm (6 ft 1 in)
- Weight: 83 kg (183 lb)

Sport
- Country: Spain
- Sport: Rowing

Manuel Vera Vázquez (Note: In this Spanish name, the first or paternal surname is Vera and the second or maternal family name is Vázquez.) (born 13 October 1962) is a Spanish rower who participated in the 1980, 1984, and 1988 Summer Olympics.

Vera was born in Seville. He participated in the 1980 Olympic Games in Moscow where he came in fifth place in the quad scull. At the 1984 Summer Olympics he came in sixth position in the quad scull. At the 1988 Olympic Games in Seoul, he came in seventh place in the double sculls.
