= Sjoerd Hoekstra =

Dutch rower (born 1959)

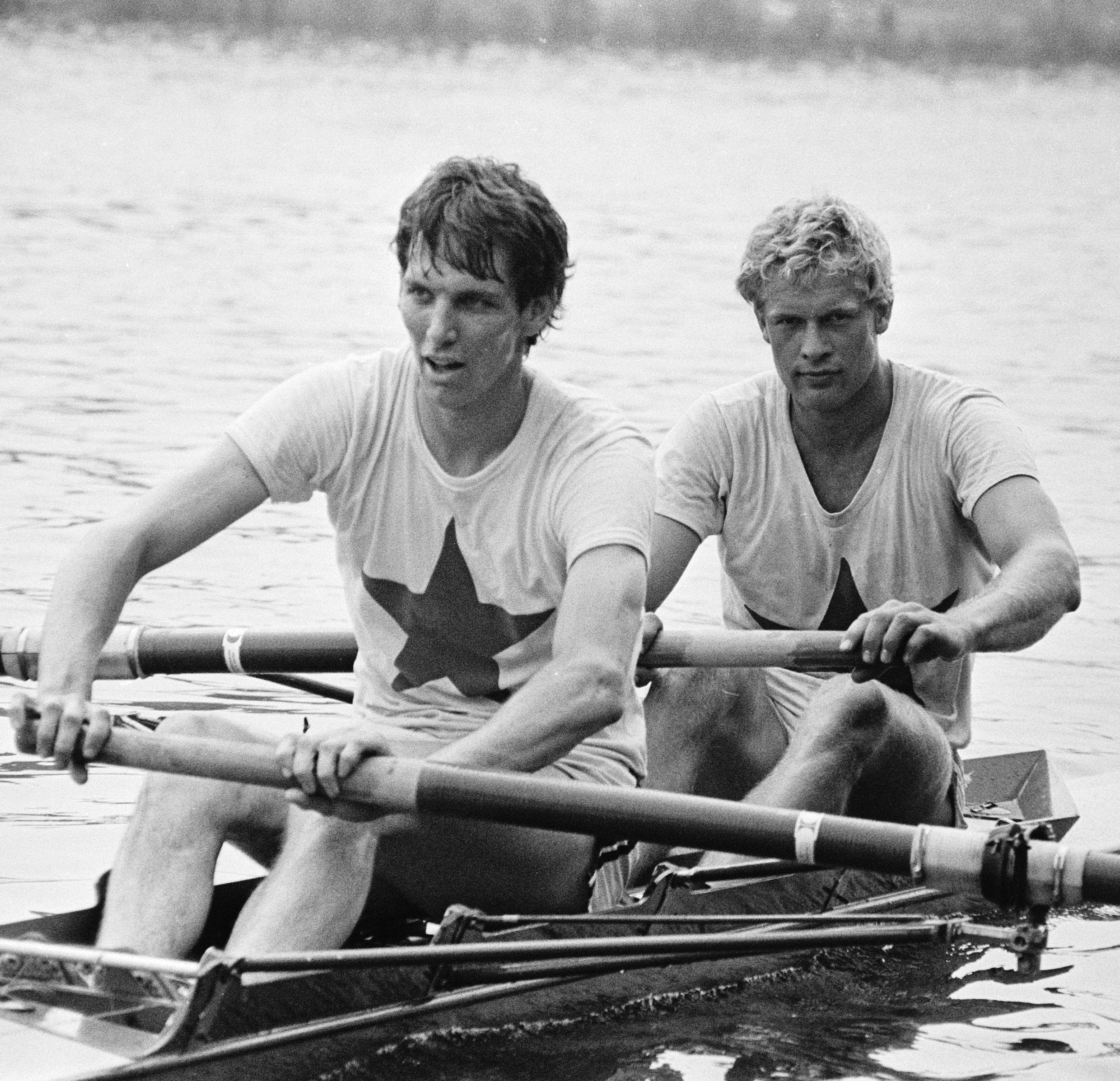
- Joost Adema and Sjoerd Hoekstra (right) in 1982

Personal information
- Born: 27 July 1959 (age 66) Leiden, the Netherlands
- Height: 1.92 m (6 ft 4 in)
- Weight: 86 kg (190 lb)

Sport
- Sport: Rowing
- Club: Aegir, Groningen
Medal record
Men's rowing
Representing the Netherlands
World Rowing Championships
Bronze medal – third place	1982 Lucerne	Coxless pairs

Sjoerd Hoekstra (born 27 July 1959) is a retired Dutch rower who specialized in the coxless pair. In this event, together with Joost Adema, he won a bronze medal at the 1982 World Rowing Championships and finished in seventh place at the 1984 Summer Olympics.
