= Robert Booth (rower) =

Australian rower

Personal information
- Nationality: Australian
- Born: 26 March 1964 (age 61)

Sport
- Sport: Rowing

Robert Booth (born 26 March 1964) is an Australian rower. He competed in the men's coxless pair event at the 1984 Summer Olympics.
