= Marco Romano (rower) =

Italian rower

Personal information
- Born: 14 October 1963 (age 62) Naples, Italy

Sport
- Sport: Rowing
Medal record
Men's rowing
Representing Italy
World Rowing Championships
Gold medal – first place	1982 Lucerne	Lwt men's four
Silver medal – second place	1986 Nottingham	Men's pair
Summer Universiade
Bronze medal – third place	1987 Zagreb	Coxless pairs

Marco Romano (born 14 October 1963) is an Italian lightweight rower. He won a gold medal at the 1982 World Rowing Championships in Lucerne with the lightweight men's four.
