= Uwe Heppner =

East German rower

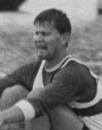
- Heppner in 1985

Personal information
- Born: 26 June 1962 (age 64) Merseburg, East Germany
- Height: 196 cm (6 ft 5 in)
- Weight: 91 kg (201 lb)

Sport
- Sport: Rowing
- Club: SV Halle, Halle an der Saale
Medal record
Representing East Germany
Olympic Games
Gold medal – first place	1980 Moscow	Quadruple sculls
World Rowing Championships
Gold medal – first place	1981 Munich	Quadruple sculls
Gold medal – first place	1982 Lucerne	Quadruple sculls
Gold medal – first place	1983 Duisburg	Double sculls
Gold medal – first place	1985 Hazewinkel	Double sculls
Bronze medal – third place	1979 Bled	Double sculls
Bronze medal – third place	1986 Nottingham	Double sculls
Bronze medal – third place	1987 Copenhagen	Double sculls

Uwe Heppner (born 18 July 1960) is a retired German rower. He competed for East Germany at the 1980 and 1988 Summer Olympics and won a gold medal in the quadruple sculls in 1980. He finished fifth in the double sculls in 1988. Between 1979 and 1987 he won four gold and three bronze medals in these two events at the world championships and finished fourth in 1989. In October 1986, he was awarded a Patriotic Order of Merit in gold (first class) for his sporting success.
