= Rowing at the 1988 Summer Olympics – Men's quadruple sculls =

Men's quadruple sculls at the Games of the XXIV Olympiad
- Date: 20–25 September 1988
- Competitors: 52 from 13 nations

Medalists
1st place, gold medalist(s)		Agostino Abbagnale; Davide Tizzano; Gianluca Farina; Piero Poli	Italy
2nd place, silver medalist(s)		Alf Hansen; Rolf Thorsen; Lars Bjønness; Vetle Vinje	Norway
3rd place, bronze medalist(s)		Jens Köppen; Steffen Zühlke; Steffen Bogs; Heiko Habermann	East Germany

The men's quadruple sculls competition at the 1988 Summer Olympics took place on the Han River Regatta Course, South Korea.

== Competition format ==
The competition consisted of three main rounds (heats, semifinals, and finals) as well as a repechage. The 13 boats were divided into three heats for the first round, with 4 or 5 boats in each heat. The top three boats in each heat (9 boats total) advanced directly to the semifinals. The remaining 4 boats were placed in the repechage. The repechage featured a single heat; the top three boats advanced to the semifinals, while the last place boat was eliminated (13th place overall). The 12 semifinalist boats were divided into two heats of 6 boats each. The top three boats in each semifinal (6 boats total) advanced to the "A" final to compete for medals and 4th through 6th place; the bottom three boats in each semifinal were sent to the "B" final for 7th through 12th.

All races were over a 2000 metre course.

== Results ==
=== Heats ===
The heats were held on 20 September, a sunny day with 17–18 °C temperatures and 0.9–1.1 m/s west to west-northwest winds. The top three boats in each heat advanced to the semifinals, with all others going to the repechage. No boats were eliminated in this round.

==== Heat 1 ====
The first heat saw the Hungarian boat take an early lead, by 0.42 seconds over the East Germans at the 500 metre mark. Hungary, however, had the worst second 500 metres of any team and fell back to fourth place. Australia took the lead by halfway; they and East Germany battled for the top spot, but both had little doubt that they would advance. Poland had taken over the third spot when Hungary fell back, and the contest between those two would decide the last advancement place. Hungary was behind by nearly a second at the 1500 metre point, but was able to successfully overtake Poland in the last quarter. The United States trailed the entire way.

Rank	Rowers	Nation	Time	Notes
1	Steffen Bogs; Heiko Habermann; Jens Köppen; Steffen Zühlke	East Germany	5:48.70	Q
2	Peter Antonie; Richard Powell; Paul Reedy; Brenton Terrell	Australia	5:50.47	Q
3	Ferenc Dózsa; Ferenc Hompóth; Gábor Mitring; Zoltán Molnár	Hungary	5:51.75	Q
4	Sławomir Cieślakowski; Andrzej Krzepiński; Mirosław Mruk; Tomasz Świątek	Poland	5:52.41	R
5	Charlie Altekruse; Jack Frackleton; Greg Montesi; John Strotbeck	United States	5:54.08	R

==== Heat 2 ====
The second heat had the Soviets leading at the halfway mark, followed by the West German team. Italy made a strong push in the second half, however, passing both boats to claim the lead. Czechoslovakia trailed the entire time, becoming the only boat from this heat to be sent to the repechage.

Rank	Rowers	Nation	Time	Notes
1	Agostino Abbagnale; Gianluca Farina; Piero Poli; Davide Tizzano	Italy	5:48.77	Q
2	Sergey Kinyakin; Pavel Krupko; Oleksandr Zaskalko; Yuriy Zelikovich	Soviet Union	5:51.70	Q
3	Georg Agrikola; Christoph Galandi; Oliver Grüner; Andreas Reinke	West Germany	5:52.45	Q
4	Václav Chalupa Jr.; Jiří Jakoubek; Pavel Lůžek; Martin Tichý	Czechoslovakia	5:55.45	R

==== Heat 3 ====
The odd team out in the third heat quickly became clear, as Argentina was behind the third place team by 2 seconds at 500 metres and by 3 seconds at 1000 metres. The gap continued to widen and Argentina finished nearly 11 seconds out of the final advancement spot. Within the lead group, Canada led early but Norway established control by the halfway mark. The Netherlands passed Canada as well in the final quarter stretch.

Rank	Rowers	Nation	Time	Notes
1	Lars Bjønness; Alf Hansen; Rolf Thorsen; Vetle Vinje	Norway	5:51.60	Q
2	Robert Bakker; Herman van den Eerenbeemt; Hans Keldermann; Jürgen Nelis	Netherlands	5:53.42	Q
3	Paul Douma; Doug Hamilton; Mel LaForme; Robert Mills	Canada	5:54.01	Q
4	Rubén D'Andrilli; Marcelo Fernández; Sergio Fernández González; Claudio Guindón	Argentina	6:04.77	R

=== Repechage ===
The single-heat repechage was held on 21 September, a sunny and warm (23.6 °C) day with 1.3 m/s west-northwest winds. The top three boats in the repechage advanced to the semifinals, with the 4th place boat being eliminated at 13th place overall.

Poland started strong and led at the halfway mark, but had the slowest third and fourth quarters of the field and dropped back into second as Czechoslovakia pushed forward into the lead. The battle for third place was between Argentina and the United States; the Americans held a 2.57 lead at halfway, but the Argentine team made up more than a second of that in between 1000 and 1500 metres and finished with a final quarter more than 2 seconds faster than the Americans, passing them and avoiding elimination.

Rank	Rowers	Nation	Time	Notes
1	Václav Chalupa Jr.; Jiří Jakoubek; Pavel Lůžek; Martin Tichý	Czechoslovakia	5:55.80	Q
2	Sławomir Cieślakowski; Andrzej Krzepiński; Mirosław Mruk; Tomasz Świątek	Poland	5:57.61	Q
3	Rubén D'Andrilli; Marcelo Fernández; Sergio Fernández González; Claudio Guindón	Argentina	5:58.27	Q
4	Charlie Altekruse; Jack Frackleton; Greg Montesi; John Strotbeck	United States	5:59.07	

=== Semifinals ===
The semifinals were held on 22 September, a sunny day with roughly 20 °C temperatures. The wind was at 1.3 m/s south for the first heat and picked up to 2.2 m/s for the second. The top three boats in each semifinal advanced to the "A" final, with the bottom three going to the "B" final, out of medal contention.

==== Semifinal 1 ====
The first semifinal featured a strong start from the West German team, leading at 500 metres. Italy, however, claimed the lead by the halfway mark and retained it the rest of the way. The East German team also passed the West squad in the second half. This put the West German team at risk of missing the "A" final; they had to fight off a challenge from the Dutch team, though did so without much difficulty, finishing about 2 seconds ahead. Hungary kept close early, but fell back in the second half. Argentina was never in serious contention, though did manage to pass Hungary in the last quarter.

Rank	Rowers	Nation	Time	Notes
1	Agostino Abbagnale; Gianluca Farina; Piero Poli; Davide Tizzano	Italy	5:47.50	QA
2	Steffen Bogs; Heiko Habermann; Jens Köppen; Steffen Zühlke	East Germany	5:50.48	QA
3	Georg Agrikola; Christoph Galandi; Oliver Grüner; Andreas Reinke	West Germany	5:50.96	QA
4	Robert Bakker; Herman van den Eerenbeemt; Hans Keldermann; Jürgen Nelis	Netherlands	5:52.84	QB
5	Rubén D'Andrilli; Marcelo Fernández; Sergio Fernández González; Claudio Guindón	Argentina	5:57.56	QB
6	Ferenc Dózsa; Ferenc Hompóth; Gábor Mitring; Zoltán Molnár	Hungary	5:58.23	QB

==== Semifinal 2 ====
The second semifinal resulted in numerous changes of order and a tight race for the third and last advancement place. Czechoslovakia had the slowest start, in sixth place at 500 metres. At that point, the Soviets, Poles, and Australians were in the top 3 spots. By halfway, Norway had jumped from fifth to second behind the Soviet Union. Czechoslovakia had caught Canada; Canada would trail the remainder of the way. At 1500 metres, the Soviets and Norwegians had solidified their top two spots and the race for third came down to Czechoslovakia (which had taken that spot), Poland (2 seconds behind), and Australia (2.1 seconds behind). Australia finished strong, overtaking the other two boats to reclaim third place and advancement to the "A" final.

Rank	Rowers	Nation	Time	Notes
1	Lars Bjønness; Alf Hansen; Rolf Thorsen; Vetle Vinje	Norway	5:53.18	QA
2	Sergey Kinyakin; Pavel Krupko; Oleksandr Zaskalko; Yuriy Zelikovich	Soviet Union	5:54.62	QA
3	Peter Antonie; Richard Powell; Paul Reedy; Brenton Terrell	Australia	5:55.41	QA
4	Václav Chalupa Jr.; Jiří Jakoubek; Pavel Lůžek; Martin Tichý	Czechoslovakia	5:55.82	QB
5	Sławomir Cieślakowski; Andrzej Krzepiński; Mirosław Mruk; Tomasz Świątek	Poland	5:57.32	QB
6	Paul Douma; Doug Hamilton; Mel LaForme; Robert Mills	Canada	6:00.55	QB

=== Finals ===
==== Final B ====
The "B" final was held on 23 September, a sunny day with 17.5 °C temperatures and 0.6 m/s west-southwest wind. The six teams in the race competed for 7th through 12th place. Canada led early and maintained the lead through the 1500 metre mark, but faltered in the last quarter and dropped to third (and nearly to fourth). Poland and the Netherlands jockeyed for second and third throughout much of the race, taking advantage of Canada's weak final 500 metres to move into first (Poland) and second (the Netherlands). Hungary and Czechoslovakia made second-half pushes to get by Argentina, but neither could quite catch Canada.

Rank	Rowers	Nation	Time
7	Sławomir Cieślakowski; Andrzej Krzepiński; Mirosław Mruk; Tomasz Świątek	Poland	5:55.39
8	Robert Bakker; Herman van den Eerenbeemt; Hans Keldermann; Jürgen Nelis	Netherlands	5:55.72
9	Paul Douma; Doug Hamilton; Mel LaForme; Robert Mills	Canada	5:58.06
10	Ferenc Dózsa; Ferenc Hompóth; Gábor Mitring; Zoltán Molnár	Hungary	5:58.37
11	Václav Chalupa Jr.; Jiří Jakoubek; Pavel Lůžek; Martin Tichý	Czechoslovakia	5:58.70
12	Rubén D'Andrilli; Marcelo Fernández; Sergio Fernández González; Claudio Guindón	Argentina	6:04.47

==== Final A ====
The "A" final was held on 25 September. The temperature was 18 °C, the weather was sunny, and wind was 2.9 m/s northeast. East Germany led at 500 metres, followed closely by Italy. The East Germans could not keep the pace, however, and by the halfway mark Italy had taken the lead, with the Soviet Union second and East Germany third. This order held through 1500 metres (with Italy widening its lead to 3 seconds), before the Norwegian squad made a strong push to pass the Soviets and East Germans. Norway was far enough behind Italy to not seriously challenge for the gold, but took silver. The East Germans outpaced the Soviets in the last quarter, taking the bronze medal. Australia trailed West Germany slightly for fifth place throughout most of the race, but passed the West Germans near the end.

Rank	Rowers	Nation	Time
1st place, gold medalist(s)	Agostino Abbagnale; Gianluca Farina; Piero Poli; Davide Tizzano	Italy	5:53.37
2nd place, silver medalist(s)	Lars Bjønness; Alf Hansen; Rolf Thorsen; Vetle Vinje	Norway	5:55.08
3rd place, bronze medalist(s)	Steffen Bogs; Heiko Habermann; Jens Köppen; Steffen Zühlke	East Germany	5:56.13
4	Sergey Kinyakin; Pavel Krupko; Oleksandr Zaskalko; Yuriy Zelikovich	Soviet Union	5:57.18
5	Peter Antonie; Richard Powell; Paul Reedy; Brenton Terrell	Australia	5:59.15
6	Georg Agrikola; Christoph Galandi; Oliver Grüner; Andreas Reinke	West Germany	5:59.59

== Final classification ==
Rank	Rowers	Country
1st place, gold medalist(s)	Agostino Abbagnale; Davide Tizzano; Gianluca Farina; Piero Poli	Italy
2nd place, silver medalist(s)	Alf Hansen; Rolf Thorsen; Lars Bjønness; Vetle Vinje	Norway
3rd place, bronze medalist(s)	Jens Köppen; Steffen Zühlke; Steffen Bogs; Heiko Habermann	East Germany
4	Pavel Krupko; Oleksandr Zaskalko; Sergey Kinyakin; Yuriy Zelikovich	Soviet Union
5	Richard Powell; Brenton Terrell; Paul Reedy; Peter Antonie	Australia
6	Christoph Galandi; Oliver Grüner; Georg Agrikola; Andreas Reinke	West Germany
7	Sławomir Cieślakowski; Andrzej Krzepiński; Mirosław Mruk; Tomasz Świątek	Poland
8	Robert Bakker; Hans Keldermann; Jürgen Nelis; Herman van den Eerenbeemt	Netherlands
9	Paul Douma; Doug Hamilton; Mel LaForme; Robert Mills	Canada
10	Ferenc Dózsa; Ferenc Hompóth; Gábor Mitring; Zoltán Molnár	Hungary
11	Václav Chalupa Jr. Jiří Jakoubek; Pavel Lůžek; Martin Tichý	Czechoslovakia
12	Rubén D'Andrilli; Marcelo Fernández; Sergio Fernández; Claudio Guindón	Argentina
13	Charlie Altekruse; Jack Frackleton; Greg Montesi; John Strotbeck	United States
