= Pavel Lůžek =

Czech rower

Personal information
- Nationality: Czech
- Born: 3 April 1964 (age 60); Ústí nad Labem, Czechoslovakia

Sport
- Sport: Rowing

Pavel Lůžek (born 3 April 1964) is a Czech rower. He competed in the men's quadruple sculls event at the 1988 Summer Olympics.

== Biography ==
Pavel Lužek was born April 3, 1964 in Usti nad Labem, Czechoslovakia.

Played in rowing in Prague and trained at the metropolitan rowing club Dukla.

Made his first international appearance in 1986 when he was part of the Czechoslovak national team and competed at the World Championships in Nottingham, where he finished in the top ten in the pairs doubles classification.

In 1987, he placed ninth in the pairs fours at the World Championships in Copenhagen.

Due to successful performances, he won the right to defend the honor of the country at the 1988 Summer Olympics in Seoul. In the crew of four, which also included rowers Václav Chalupa, Jiří Jakoubek and Martin Tichý, he finished fourth in the preliminary qualifying stage, but in the additional qualifying heat, he overcame all his rivals and thus qualified for the semi-final stage, where he finished fourth again. In the repechage finals, B finished fifth and was ranked 11th in the final standings.

After the Seoul Olympics, Lužek did not show any more significant results in rowing on the international scene.
