= Brenton Terrell =

Australian rower (born 1961)

Personal information
- Nationality: Australian
- Born: 26 July 1961 (age 65) Adelaide, Australia

Sport
- Sport: Rowing
- Club: Port Adelaide Rowing Club

Achievements and titles
- Olympic finals: Quad scull Seoul 1988
- National finals: President's Cup 1986-88.
Medal record
Men's rowing
Representing Australia
Commonwealth Games
Silver medal – second place	1986 Edinburgh	Double scull

Brenton Terrell (born 26 July 1961) is an Australian former representative rower. He is an Australian national champion in the single scull, an Olympian and a Commonwealth Games silver medallist.

== Club and state rowing ==
A South Australian, Terrell's senior sculling was from the Port Adelaide Rowing Club.

In Port Adelaide colours Terrell contested a number of national titles at Australian Rowing Championships in the 1980s. He won two silvers and a bronze across the three men's senior sculling events at the 1985 Championships, silver in both the double and quad scull in 1986, bronze in the double-scull in 1987 and silver in all three sculling events at the 1988 Australian Championships.

Terrell first made state selection for South Australia in 1986 when picked to race for the President's Cup - the interstate single scull championship at the Interstate Regatta within the Australian Rowing Championships. He placed fifth that year. He made two further President's Cup appearances for South Australia placing third in 1987, and winning the event and a national title in 1988. He is one of only three South Australians to win the Australian men's interstate single sculling championship.

== International representative rowing ==
Terrell first won national selection for Australia when picked as the single-scull entrant for the 1985 World Rowing Championships on Hazelwinkel. He was knocked out in the repechage and did not made the B final for an overall placing. At the 1986 Commonwealth Games rowing in the men's double sculls with Paul Reedy, Terrell won a silver medal.

Australia qualified a boat for the men's quadruple sculls event at the 1988 Summer Olympics. The former lightweight world champion Peter Antonie stroked the crew, completed by Australia's three top scullers of the mid-1980s Paul Reedy, Richard Powell and Terrell. Their fifth placing in the Olympic A final was impressive given Australia's lack of consistent success in heavyweight sculling in the world regattas of that time.

== Coaching career ==
Following retirement from competitive rowing, Brenton has coached many crews. Notable achievements include:

- 2007 Australian U23 women's Quad scull - 2007 U23 World Championships silver medal
- 2008 Australian U23 women's Quad scull - 2008 U23 World Championships bronze medal
- 2016 Adelaide University Boat Club intervarsity senior 8+ - 2016 Australian University Championships winners Oxford and Cambridge Cup.
