= Gianluca Farina =

Italian rower (born 1962)

Personal information
- Nationality: Italian
- Born: 15 December 1962 (age 63) Casalmaggiore, Italy
Medal record
Men's rowing
Representing Italy
Olympic Games
Gold medal – first place	1988 Seoul	Quadruple sculls
Bronze medal – third place	1992 Barcelona	Quadruple sculls

Gianluca Farina (born 15 December 1962) is an Italian competition rower and Olympic champion.

He received a gold medal in quadruple sculls at the 1988 Summer Olympics in Seoul, together with Agostino Abbagnale, Davide Tizzano, and Piero Poli.

He received a bronze medal in quadruple sculls at the 1992 Summer Olympics in Barcelona.
