= Piero Poli =

Italian rower (born 1960)

Personal information
- Nationality: Italian
- Born: 9 October 1960 (age 65) Cairo Montenotte, Italy
Medal record
Men's rowing
Representing Italy
Olympic Games
Gold medal – first place	1988 Seoul	Quadruple sculls

Piero Poli (born 9 October 1960) is an Italian competition rower and Olympic champion.

He competed in the men's coxed pair event at the 1984 Summer Olympics, finishing fourth. He received a gold medal in quadruple sculls at the 1988 Summer Olympics in Seoul, together with Agostino Abbagnale, Davide Tizzano, and Gianluca Farina.

Poli was honored by the Associazione Azzurri d'Italia, with the award presented by Claudio Gentile.
