= Aftenposten Gold Medal =

Norwegian sports award

The Aftenposten Gold Medal is one of the highest awards that are awarded within Norwegian sport. The Gold Medal was instituted in 1933 by Sport magazine. The following year, in 1934, it was taken over by Morgenbladet, and named Morgenbladet gold medal.

== History ==
From 1993 to 1996, called the price Foundation Morgenbladet gold medal. From 1997, Aftenposten over award, and the award was renamed Aftenposten gold medal.

1. Aftenposten Gold Medal awarded to the best Norwegian sports-person in the calendar year, decided by the committee.
2. The medal can not be assigned team, but to a single team sport athlete if the committee finds it justified.
3. The gold medal can only be distributed once to the same person.
4. If two or more candidates for committee opinion are equal:
5. Shall have regard to the importance of sports achievement has, or can obtain, for the particular sport.
6. The Committee shall as far as possible avoid awarding two medals in the same year.
7. The Committee may, if no candidates are worthy, neglect and distribute gold medal a year.
8. If gold medal one year no dividend shall not for that reason be awarded two Gold Medals in the following year.
9. The Committee shall consist of three or five people with rock-solid knowledge of Norwegian sport.
10. The committee's recommendation to the awarding of Gold Medal is supreme.

The Committee has for several years passed by Aftenposten sports commentator Bertil Valderhaug (Jury Chairman), sports journalist and Per Jorsett and sports leader Hroar Elvenes, both from Norwegian Sports Leader - Veterans.

Cross-country skier Sigurd Vestad became the first recipient of the award in 1933 for its superior victory femmila in Holmenkollen that year. Alpine skier Inger Bjørnbakken was in 1958 the first female recipient of the medal. She got it after here gold in Slalom World Championships in Alpine skiing.

In ten cases the jury have not clearly distinguish between the best and awarded the medal to two achievements. The first time, in 1947, there were performances of Leif Hveem and His Aasnes which could not be separated. Since the price, it has been awarded to two performances in 1955, 1957, 1965, 1987, 1989, 1992, 1993, 1994 and 1997. Four times the price has been awarded achievements made by teams, or couples. Double scull consisting of brothers Alf Hansen and Frank Hansen won in 1975. World Championship title to K2 to Einar Rasmussen and Olaf Søyland K2 won in 1979. The dancers Tone Nyhagen and Knut Saeborg won in 1987 and in 1989 Rolf Thorsen and Lars Bjønness won the goldmedal after their World Cup victory in double scull. In 2012 the medal was (for the first time) awarded to a Paralympic athlete, as Sarah Louise Rung got it after here gold at 200 meters free during the Paralympic Summer Games 2012. [2] The biggest sports by champions are athletics (15), cross country (13) and skating (9). Among clubs are Hamar IL mostwinning with five awards. Three athletes from Bærums Skiklubb has won the medal, while a further eight clubs have two athletes with medal.

== Gallery of some of the winners ==
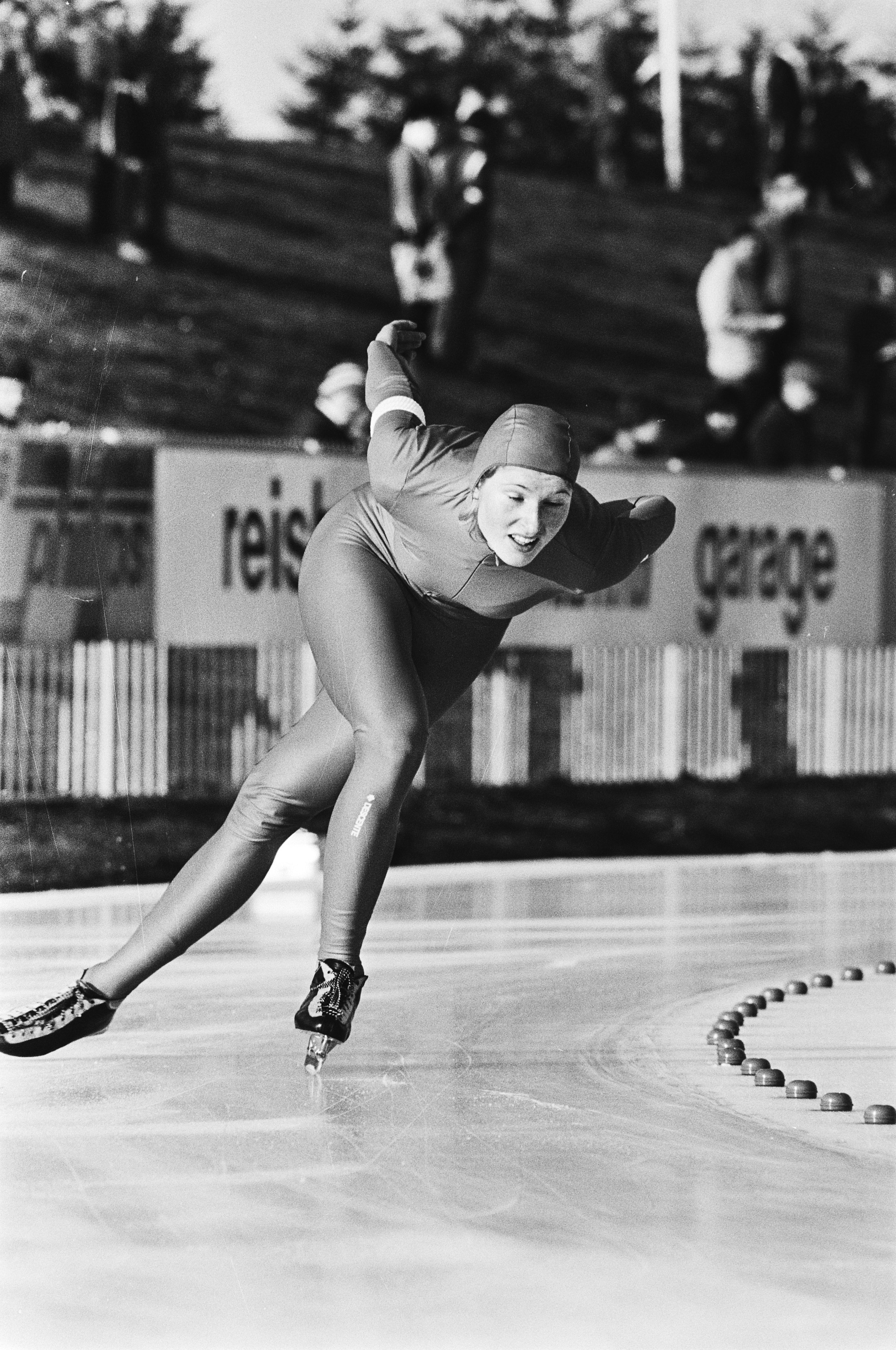
Bjørg Eva Jensen, winner in 1980

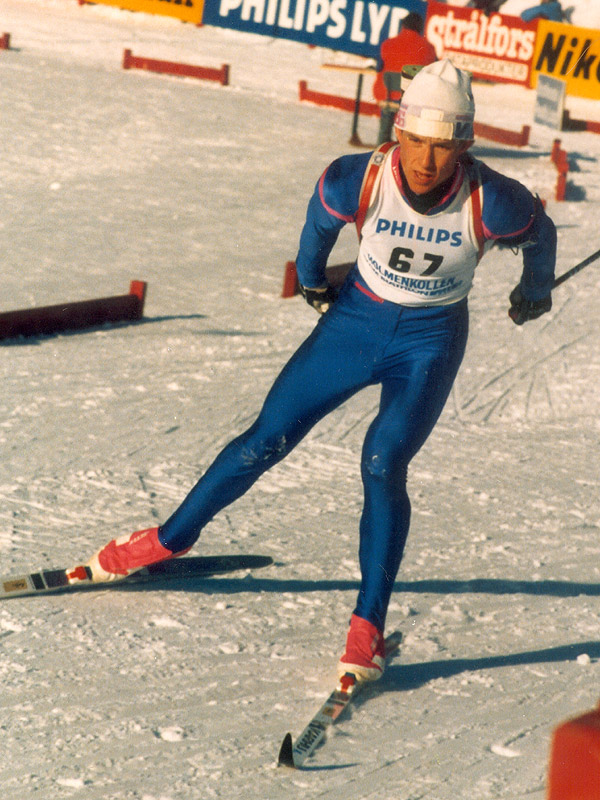
Eirik Kvalfoss, winner in 1983

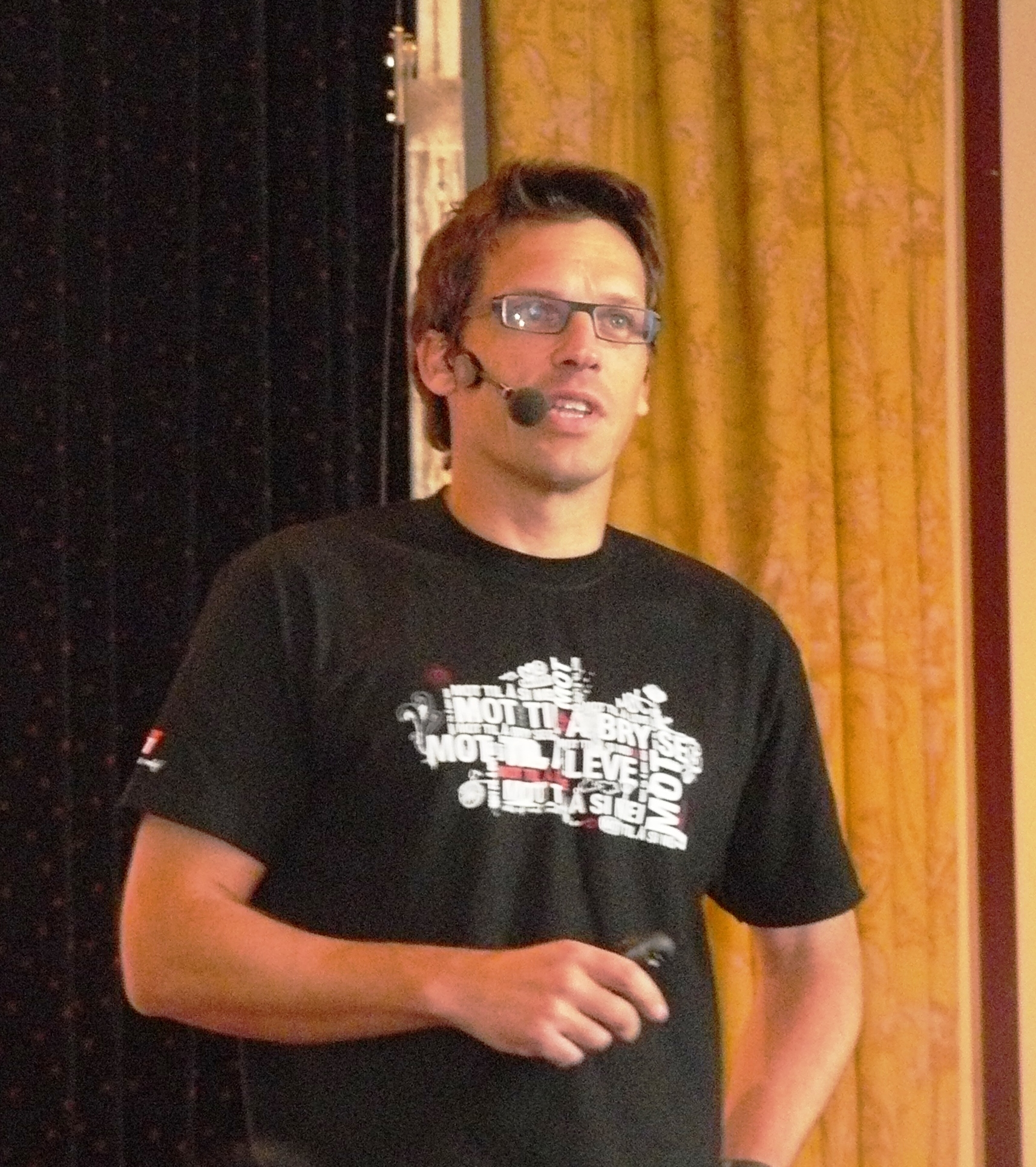
Johann Olav Koss, winner in 1990

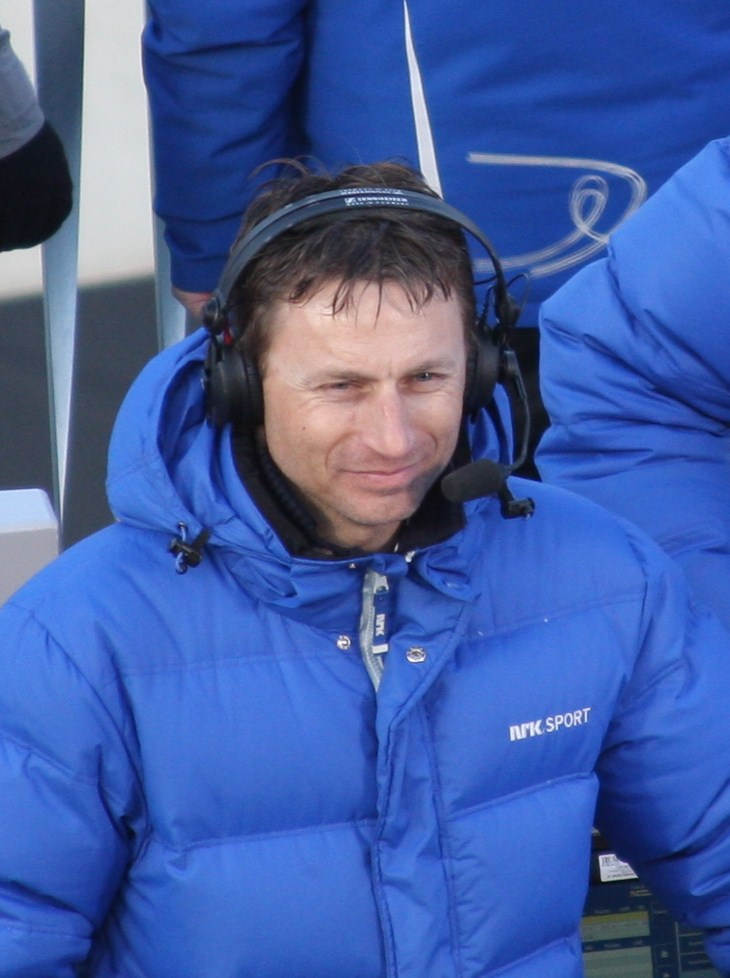
Espen Bredesen, winner in 1993

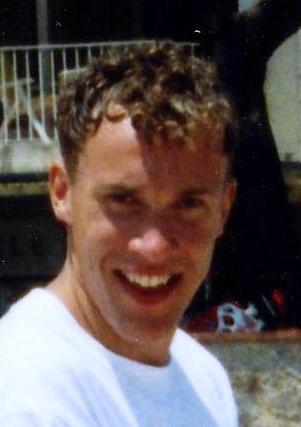
Vebjørn Rodal, winner in 1996

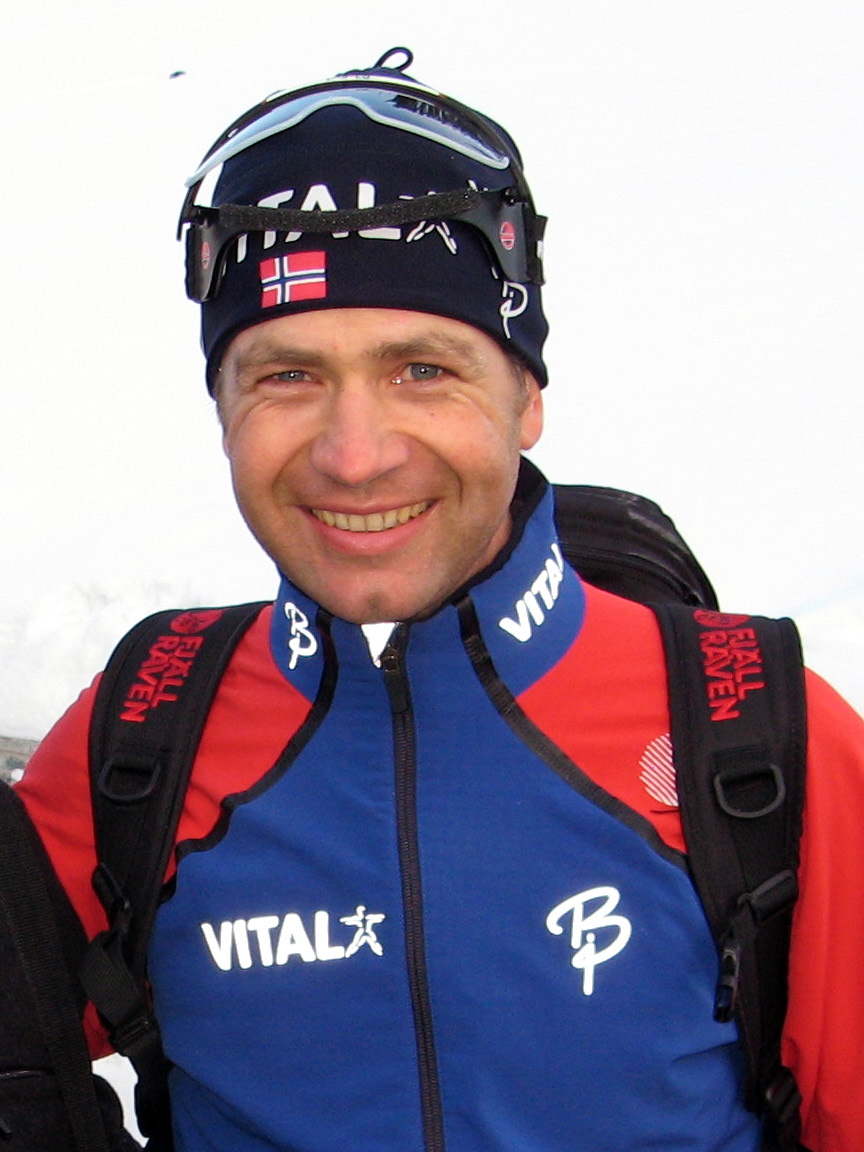
Ole Einar Bjørndalen, winner in 1998

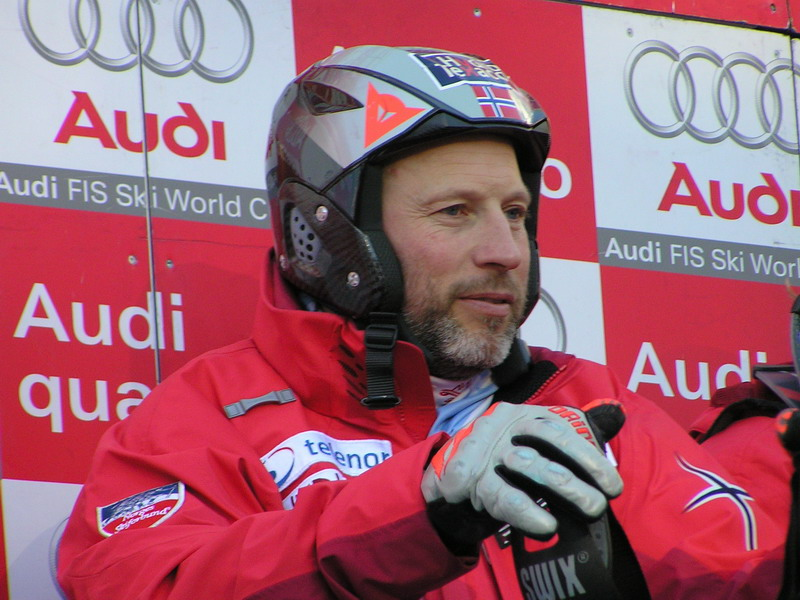
Lasse Kjus, winner in 1999

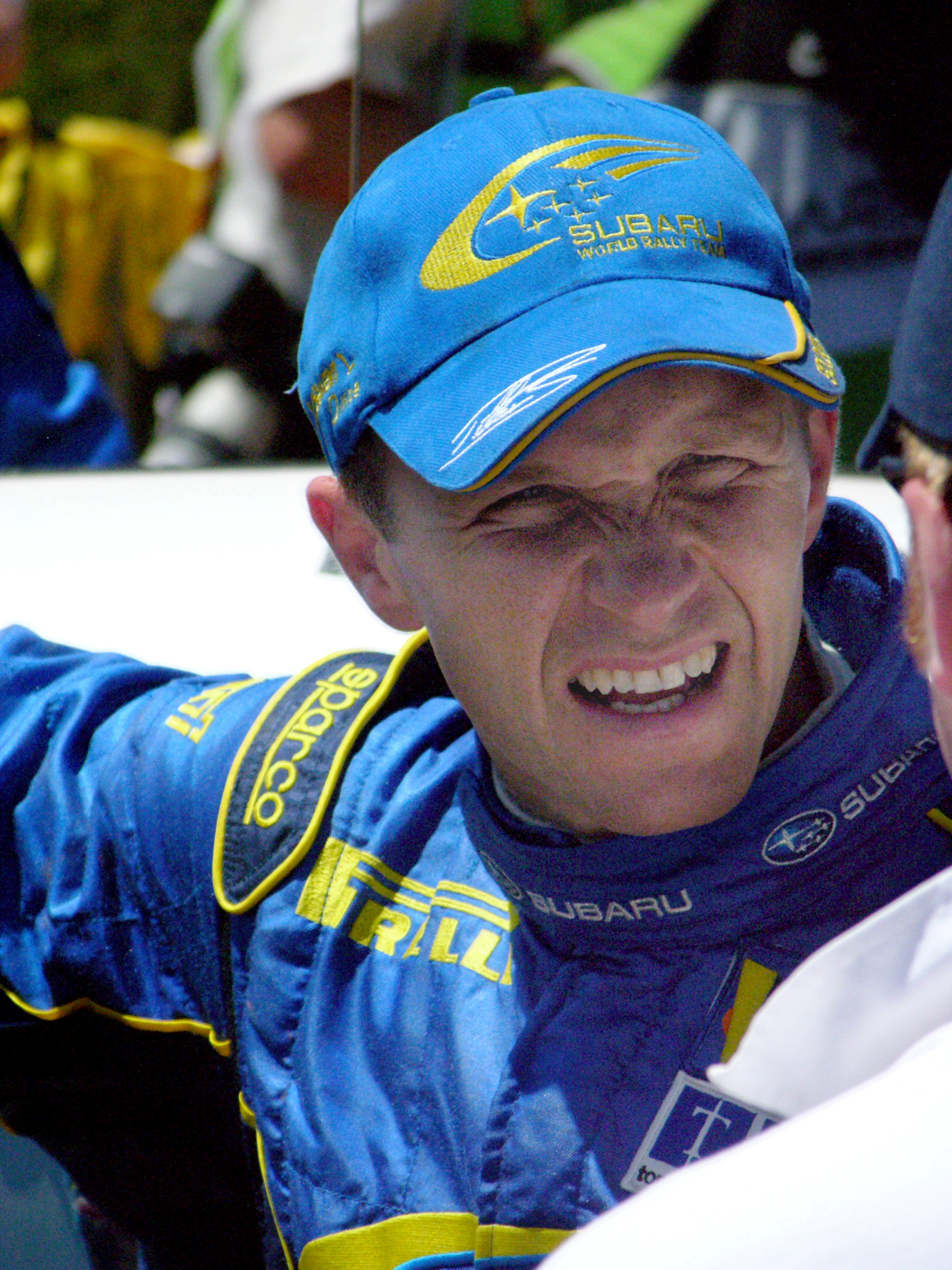
Petter Solberg winner in 2003

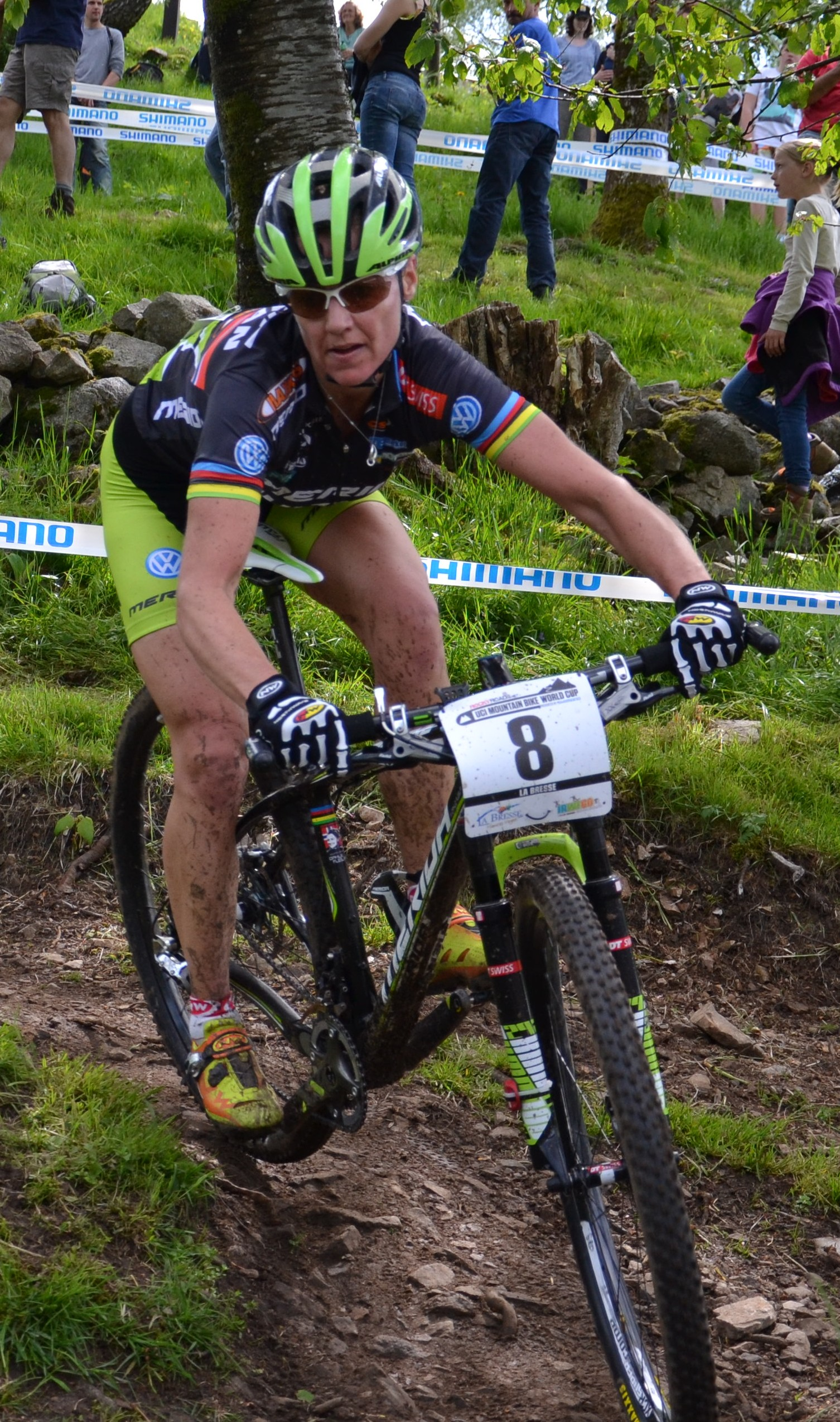
Gunn-Rita Dahle winner in 2004

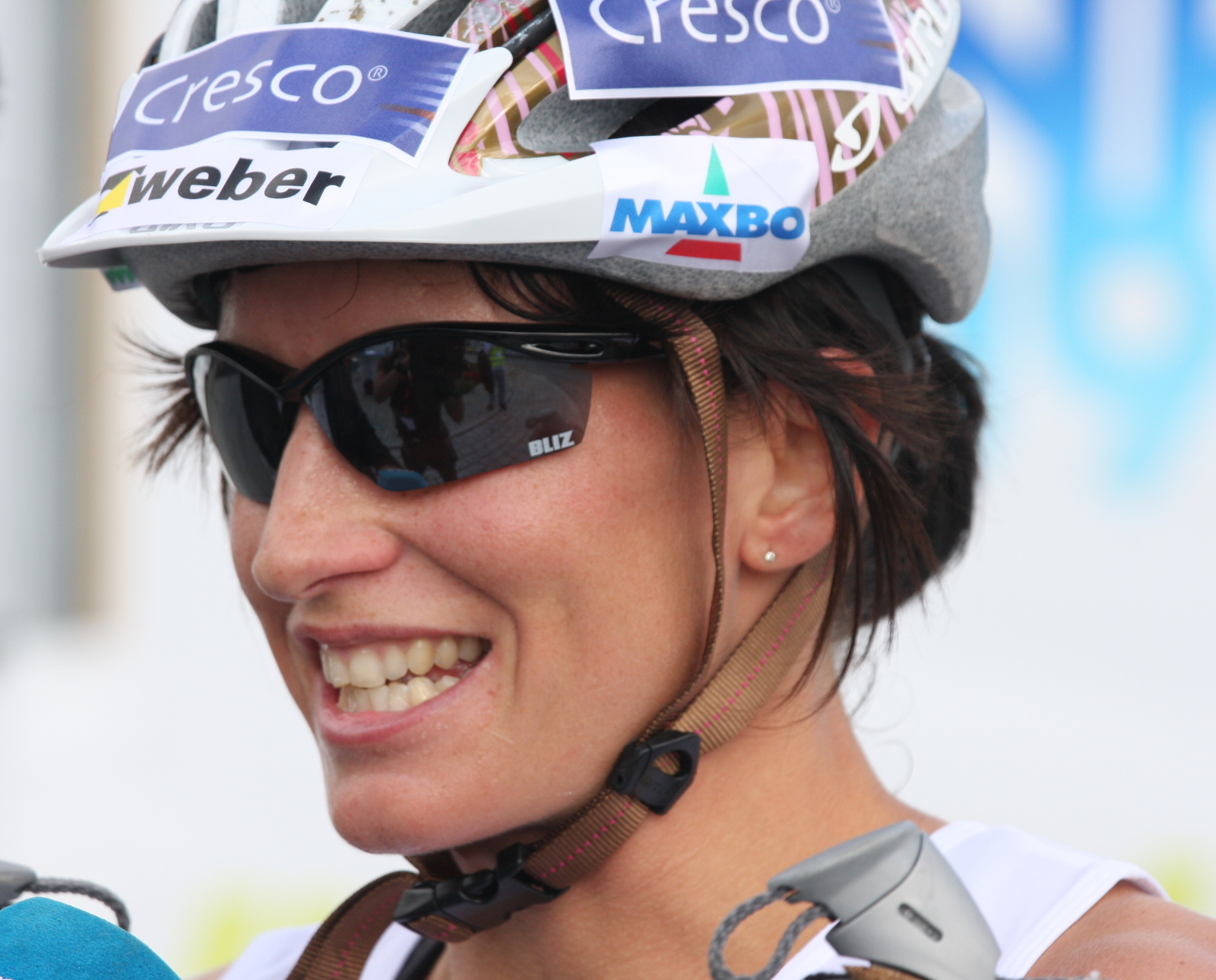
Marit Bjørgen winner in 2005

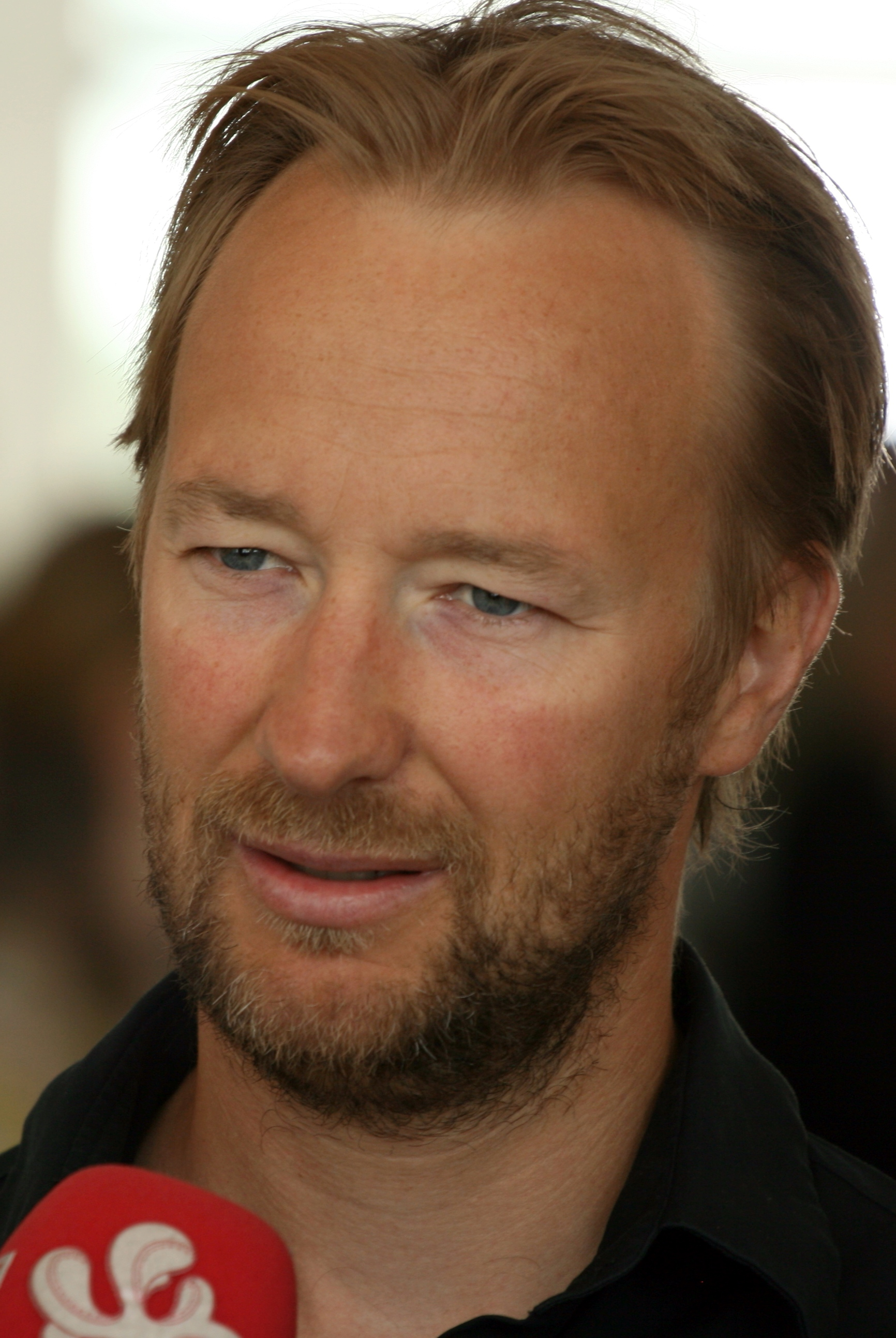
Kjetil André Aamodt, winner in 2006

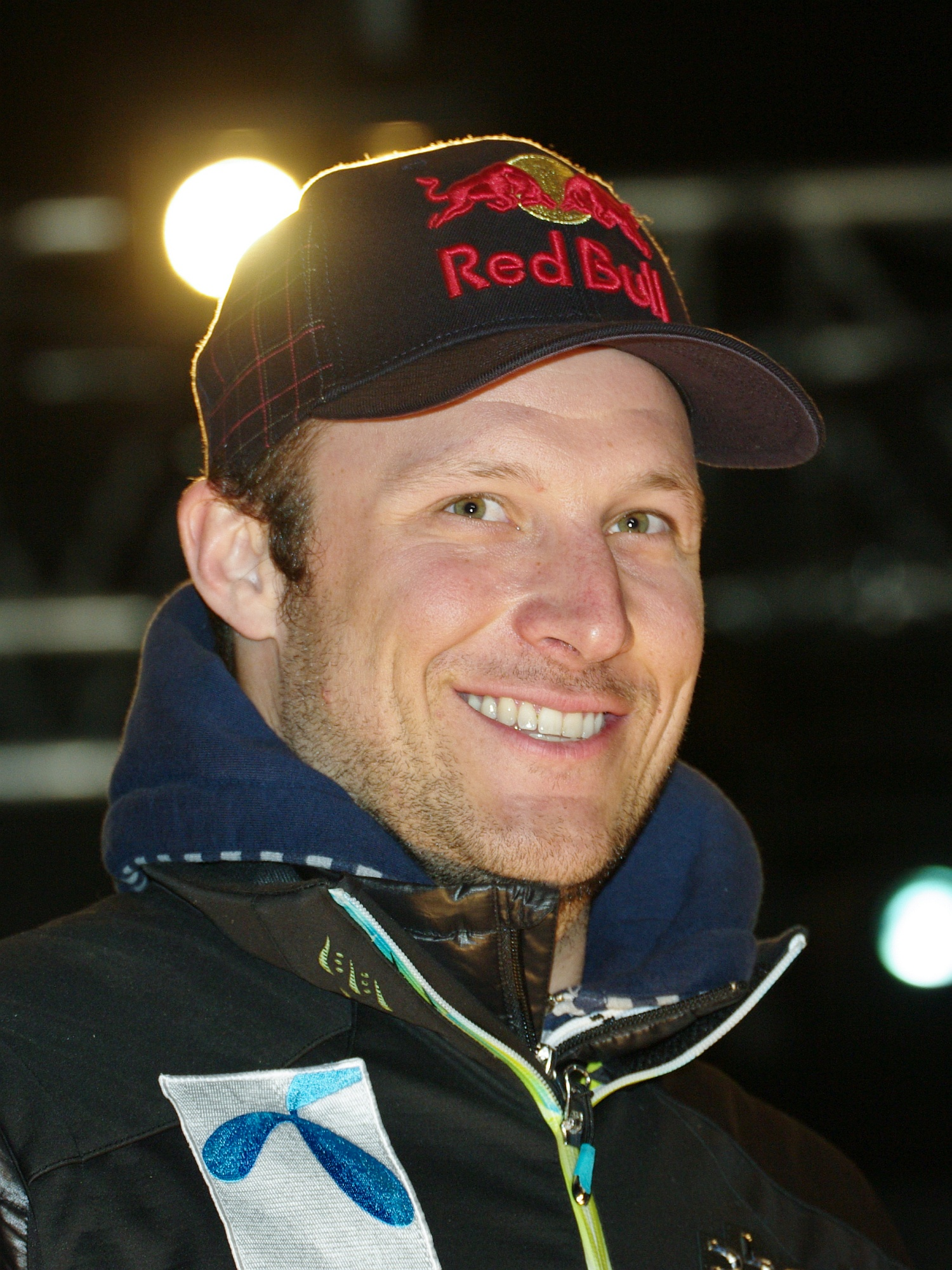
Aksel Lund Svindal, winner in 2007

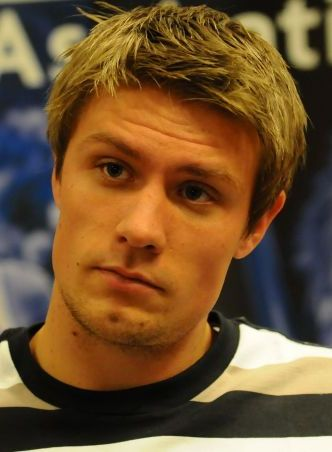
Andreas Thorkildsen winner in 2008

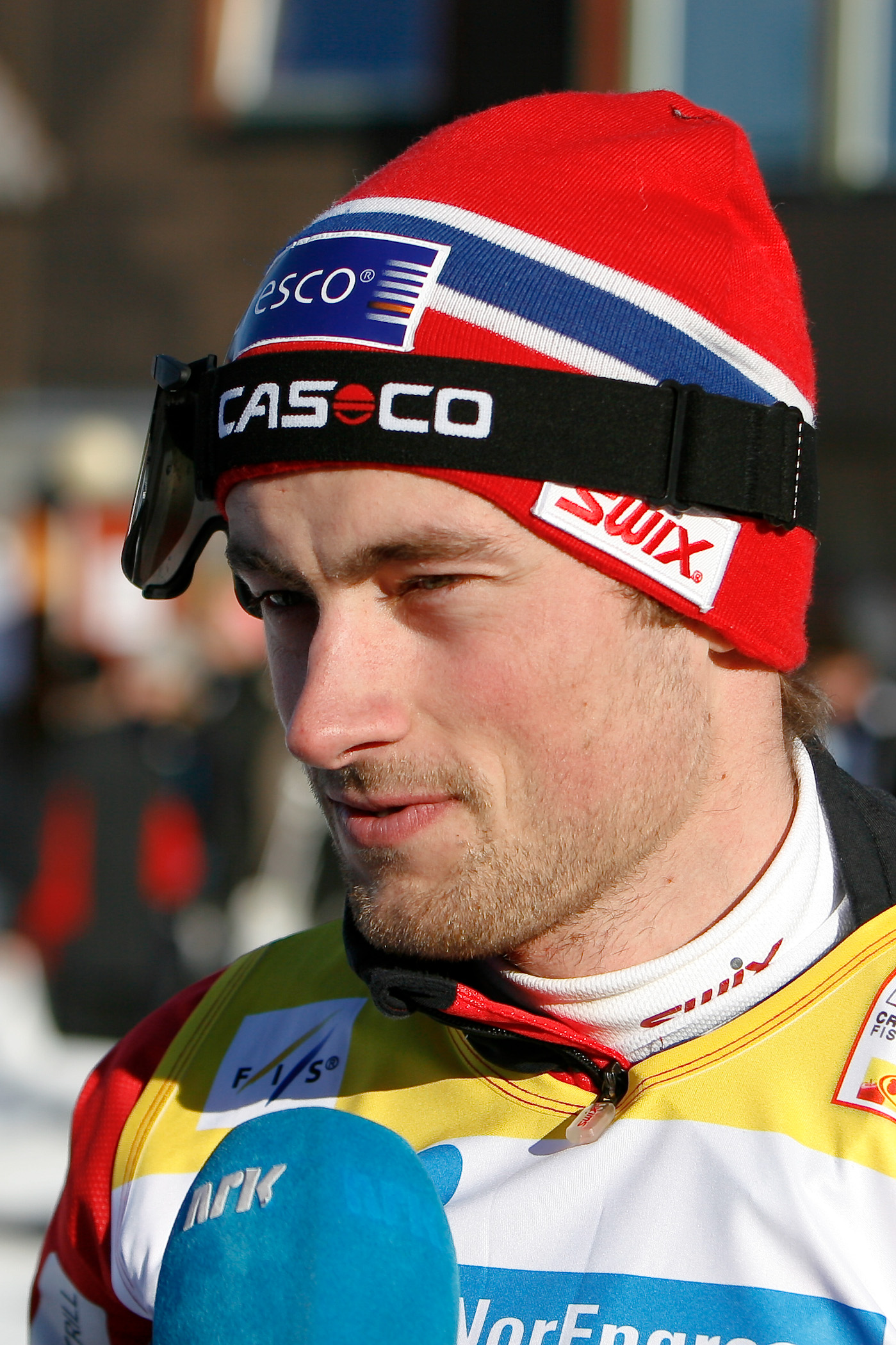
Petter Northug, winner in 2009

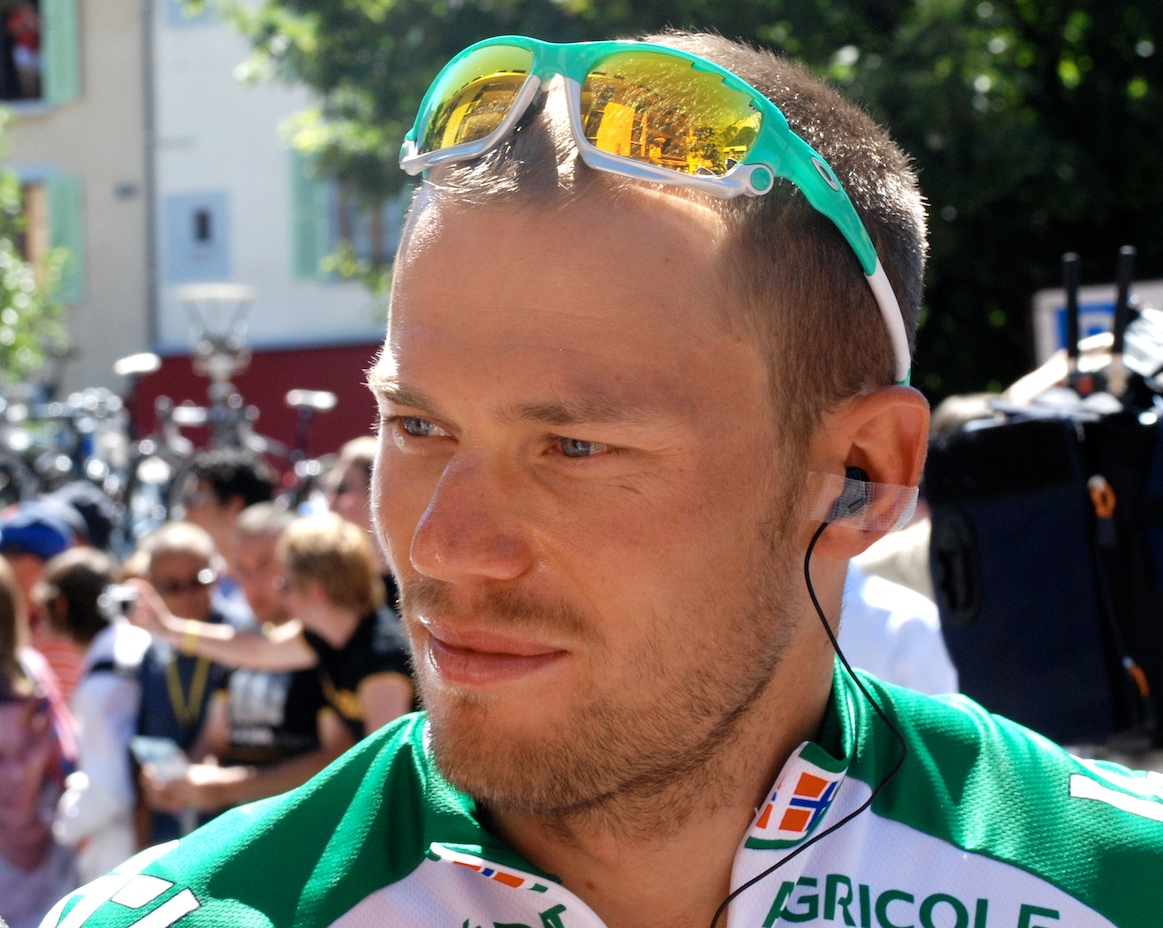
Thor Hushovd, winner in 2010

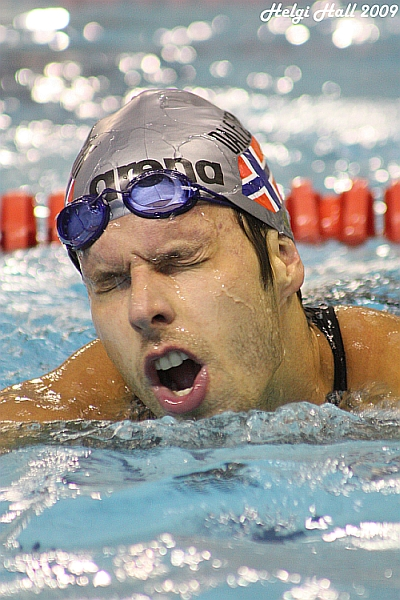
Alexander Dale Oen, winner in 2011

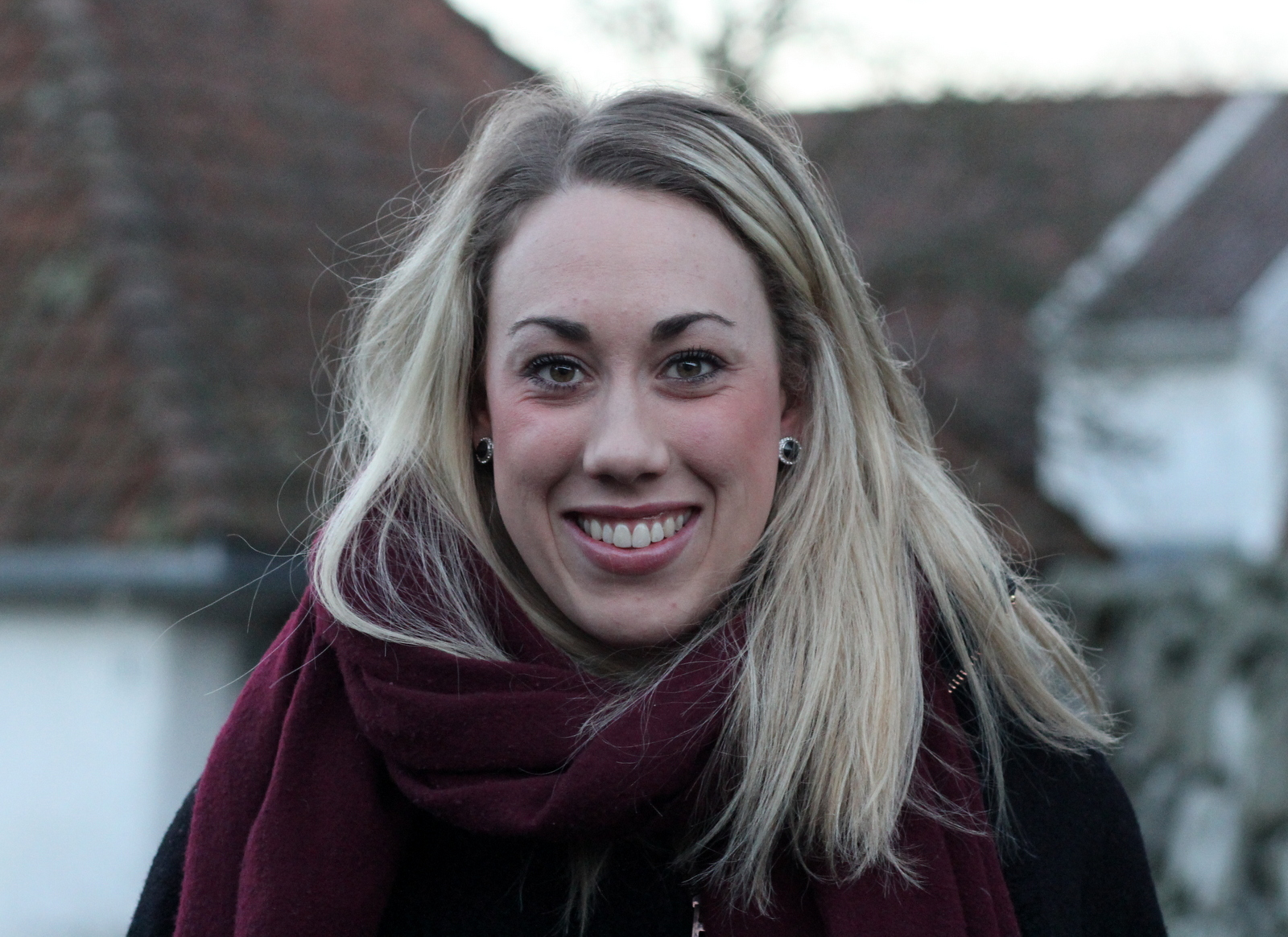
Sarah Louise Rung, winner in 2012

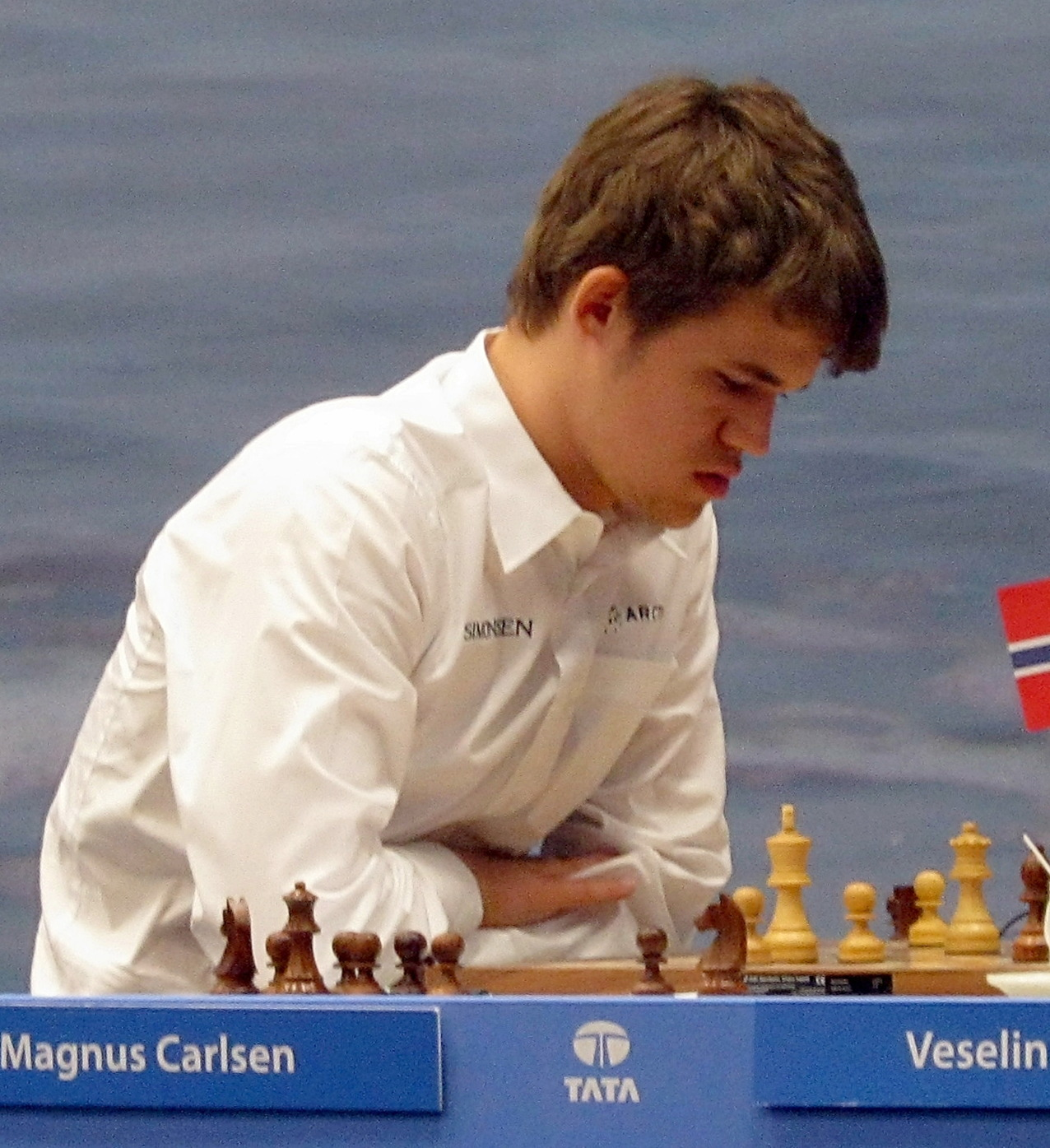
Magnus Carlsen, winner in 2013

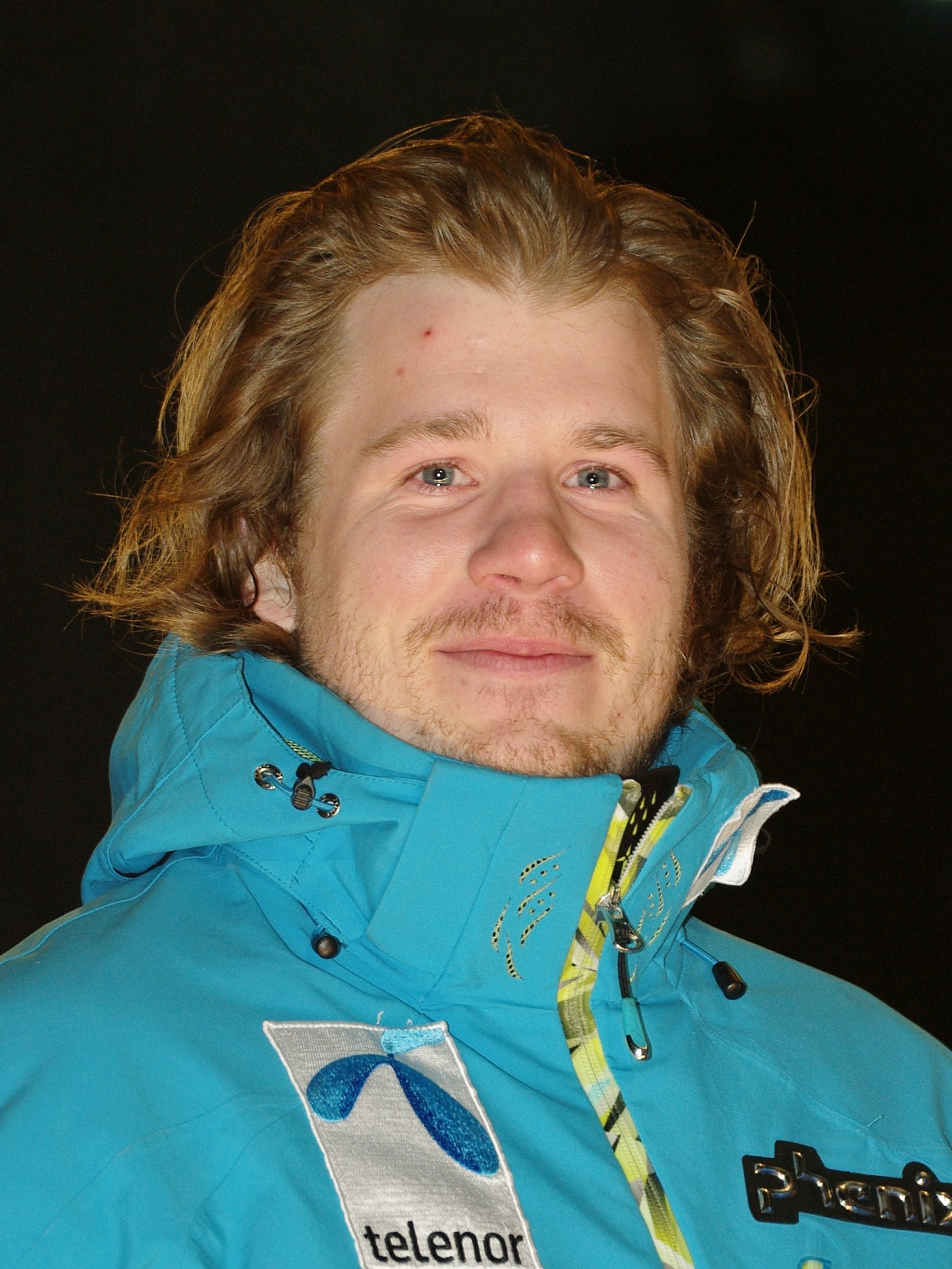
Kjetil Jansrud, winner in 2014

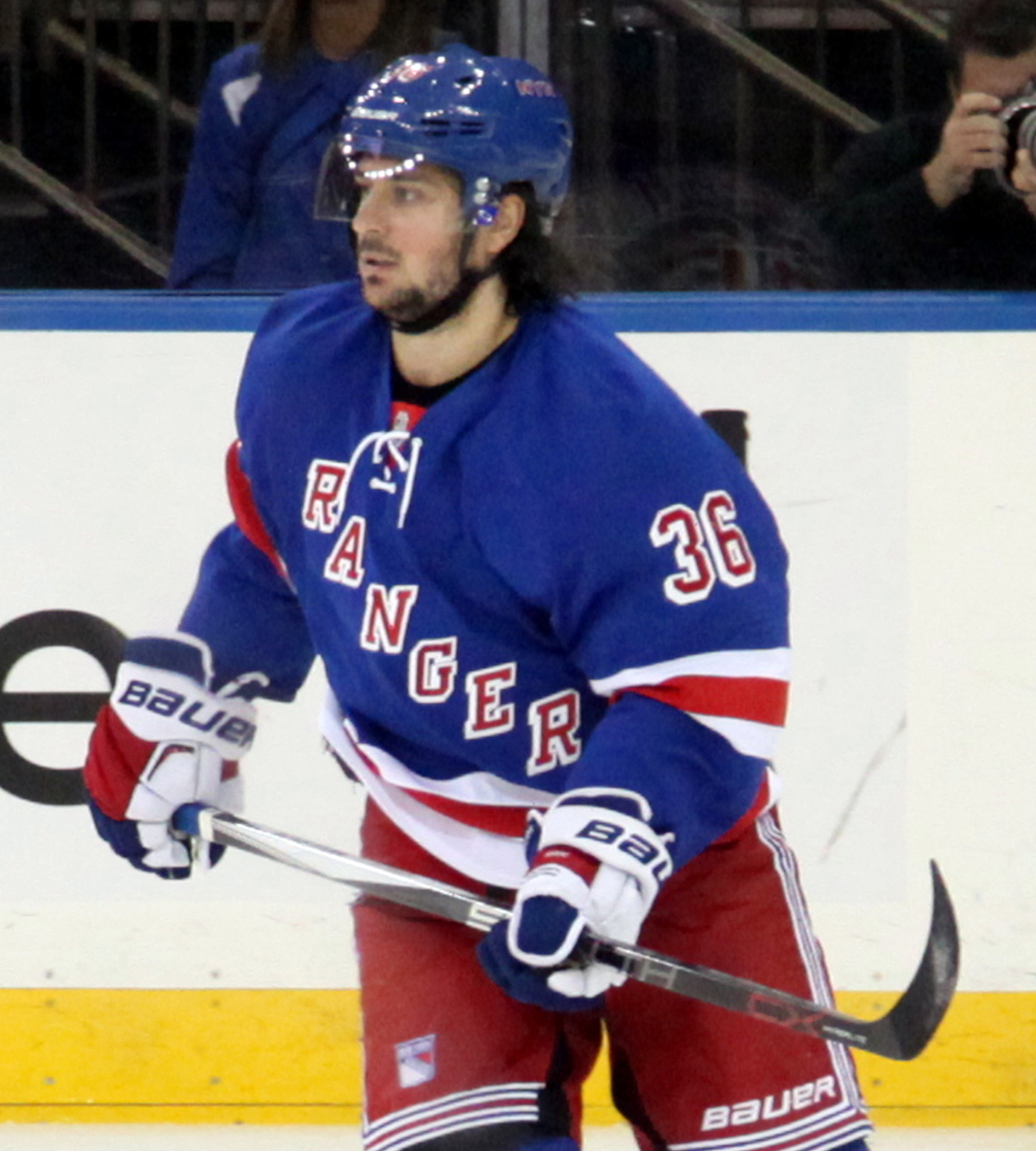
Mats Zuccarello, winner in 2015
