= Marcelo Fernández =

Marcelo Fernández may refer to:

- Marcelo Fernández (footballer) (born 2001), Paraguayan footballer
- Marcelo Fernández (rower) (born 1967), Argentine rower

== See also ==
- Marcelo Fernandes (born 1974), Brazilian footballer and manager
- Marcelo Fernandes (footballer, born 1991), Brazilian footballer
- Marcel Fernandez (born 1929), French cyclist
- Marcela Fernandez Violante (born 1941), Mexican film director
