= Thomas Keller Medal =

World Rowing Federation award

- Description: Highest honor in rowing, awarded for an outstanding international career and exemplary sportsmanship
- Country: International
- Presented by: World Rowing (FISA)
- Website: http://www.worldrowing.com/athletes/thomas-keller-medal

The Thomas Keller Medal is given by the World Rowing Federation (FISA) for an outstanding international career in the sport of rowing. It is the highest honor in rowing and is awarded to any athlete within five years of his/her retirement from the sport. It recognizes an exceptional rowing career as well as exemplary sportsmanship.

It is named after Thomas Keller who was the president of FISA from 1958 until his death in 1989.

== Past recipients ==
Year	Winner	Country	Profile
1990	Alf Hansen	NOR	
1991	Thomas Greiner	GER	
1994	Yuriy Pimenov	RUS	
1996	Francesco Esposito	ITA	
1996	Nikolay Pimenov	RUS	
1996	Rolf Thorsen	NOR	
1997	Giuseppe Abbagnale	ITA	
1997	Carmine Abbagnale	ITA	
1997	Jana Sorgers	GER	
1997	Thomas Lange	GER	
1998	Kerstin Köppen	GER	
1998	Roland Baar	GER	
1999	Silken Laumann	CAN	
1999	Kathleen Heddle	CAN	
2001	Steve Redgrave	GBR	
2002	Marnie McBean	CAN	
2003	Peter Antonie	AUS	
2004	Nico Rienks	NED	
2005	Matthew Pinsent	GBR	
2006	Agostino Abbagnale	ITA	
2007	Mike McKay	AUS	
2008	Elisabeta Lipă	ROM	
2009	Kathrin Boron	GER	
2010	James Tomkins	AUS	
2011	Jüri Jaanson	EST	
2012	Václav Chalupa	TCH	
2013	Eskild Ebbesen	DEN	
2014	Drew Ginn	AUS	
2015	Iztok Čop	SLO	
2016	Caroline Evers-Swindell	NZL	
2016	Georgina Evers-Swindell	NZL	
2017	Katherine Grainger	GBR	
2018	Eric Murray	NZL	
2018	Hamish Bond	NZL	
2019	Kim Brennan	AUS	
2020	Not awarded		
2021	Olaf Tufte	NOR	
2022	Mahe Drysdale	NZL	
2023	Caryn Davies	USA	
2024	Richard Schmidt	GER	
