= Steffen Bogs =

German rower (born 1965)

Medal record

Men's rowing

Representing East Germany

Olympic Games
Bronze medal – third place	1988 Seoul	Quadruple sculls

Steffen Bogs (born 8 October 1965 in Rostock) is a German rower.
