= Tomasz Świątek =

Polish rower

Personal information
- Nationality: Polish
- Born: 26 July 1964 (age 62) Warsaw, Poland

Sport
- Sport: Rowing
Medal record
Representing Poland
Summer Universiade
Gold medal – first place	1987 Zagreb	Quadruple sculls

Tomasz Maciej Świątek (born 26 July 1964) is a Polish rower. He competed in the men's quadruple sculls event at the 1988 Summer Olympics, in which Poland won the "B" Final to finish seventh overall.

== Sports career ==
At the 1987 Universiade, Świątek won the gold medal. Świątek was associated with the Polish university sports club AZS Warsaw. Świątek represented Poland at the men's quadruple sculls event at the 1988 Summer Olympics, where he placed seventh.

== Personal life and awards ==
Świątek is the father of Polish tennis player Iga Świątek, who is the first Polish player ranked world no. 1, and also the first player born in the 2000s to achieve the top ranking. After his daughter won the 2020 French Open women's singles title, they were both awarded Polish honours in a joint ceremony: his daughter received a Gold Cross of Merit and he was conferred an Officer's Cross of the Order of Polonia Restituta "for sports achievements, for promoting Poland in the international arena".
