= Christoph Galandi =

German rower (born 1962)

Personal information
- Nationality: German
- Born: 21 September 1962 (age 63) Berlin, Germany

Sport
- Sport: Rowing

Christoph Galandi (born 21 September 1962) is a German rower. He competed in the men's quadruple sculls event at the 1988 Summer Olympics.
