= Robert Bakker (rower) =

Dutch rower

Personal information
- Nationality: Dutch
- Born: 9 December 1962 (age 63) Mijdrecht, Netherlands

Sport
- Sport: Rowing

Robert Bakker (born 9 December 1962) is a Dutch rower. He competed in the men's quadruple sculls event at the 1988 Summer Olympics, placing eighth. He was born in Mijdrecht.
