= Oliver Grüner =

German rower

Personal information
- Nationality: German
- Born: 12 March 1966 (age 59); Frankfurt, Germany

Sport
- Sport: Rowing

Oliver Grüner (born 12 March 1966) is a German rower. He competed in the men's quadruple sculls event at the 1988 Summer Olympics.
