= Alf Hansen =

Norwegian rower (born 1948)

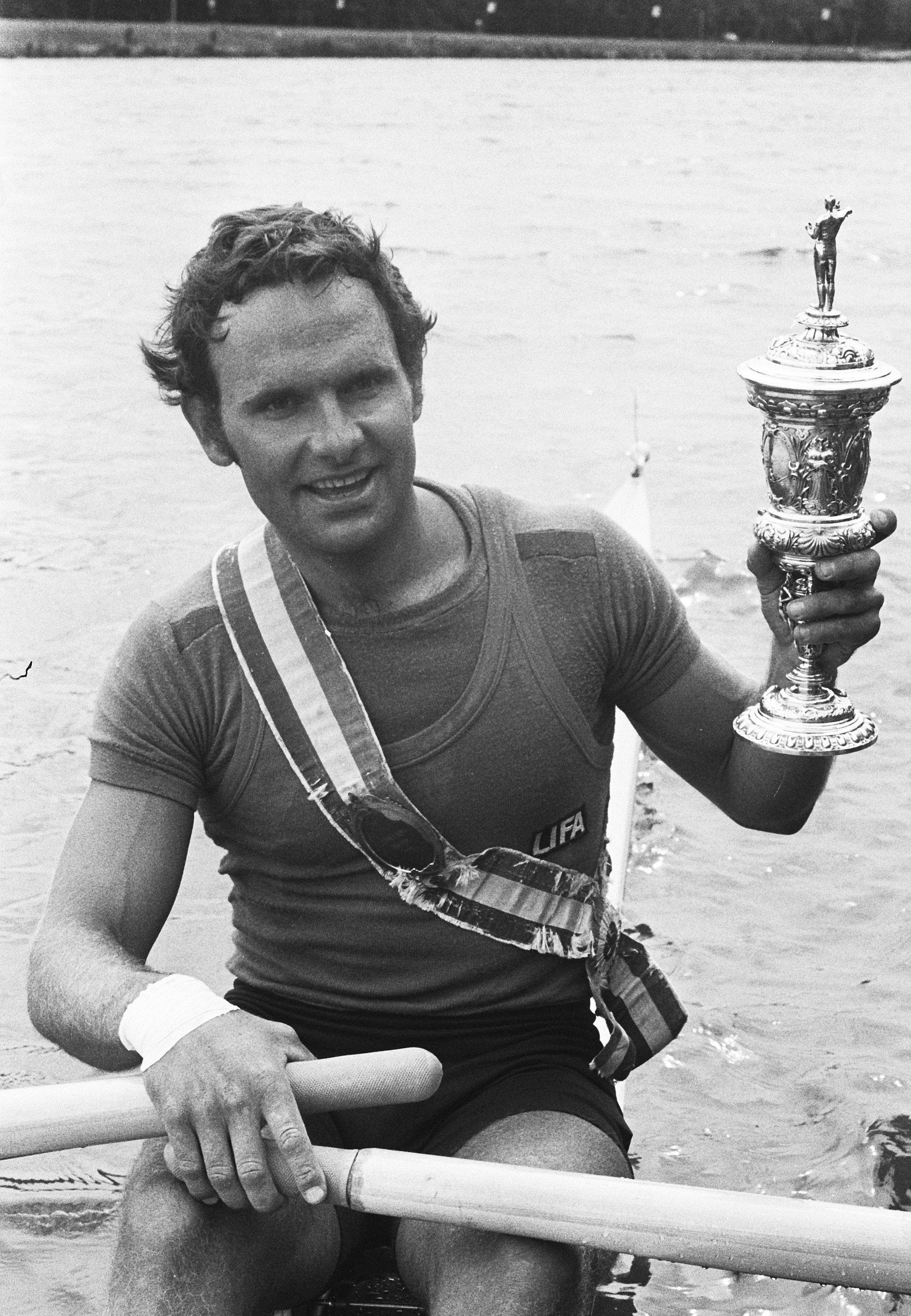
- Hansen with the Holland Beker trophy in 1978

Personal information
- Full name: Alf John Hansen
- Born: 13 July 1948 (age 78) Oslo, Norway
- Height: 1.85 m (6 ft 1 in)
- Weight: 85 kg (187 lb)
- Relatives: Frank Hansen (brother)

Sport
- Sport: Rowing
- Club: Ormsund Roklub, Oslo
Medal record
Representing Norway
Olympic Games
Gold medal – first place	1976 Montreal	Double sculls
Silver medal – second place	1988 Seoul	Quadruple sculls
World Rowing Championships
Gold medal – first place	1975 Nottingham	Double sculls
Gold medal – first place	1978 Hamilton	Double sculls
Gold medal – first place	1979 Bled	Double sculls
Gold medal – first place	1982 Lucerne	Double sculls
Silver medal – second place	1974 Lucerne	Double sculls
Silver medal – second place	1983 Duisburg	Double sculls
Silver medal – second place	1987 Copenhagen	Quadruple sculls
Bronze medal – third place	1970 St. Catharines	Coxless fours
Bronze medal – third place	1981 Munich	Double sculls

Alf John Hansen (born 13 July 1948) is a retired rower from Norway. Early in his career, he received two Norwegian sport awards shared with his brother Frank. Towards the end of his career in 1990, he was the inaugural recipient of the Thomas Keller Medal, the highest honour in rowing. His international rowing career spanned more than two decades.

== Biography ==
Hansen was born in 1948 in Oslo. His first international rowing success came at the 1970 World Rowing Championships in St. Catharines, Canada, where he won a bronze medal with the coxed four. At the 1971 European Rowing Championships, the coxed four team came seventh. He competed at the 1972 Summer Olympics in Munich, Germany, where the coxed four team came ninth. At the 1973 European Rowing Championships, the coxed four team came fifth.

He then changed boats and competed at the 1974 World Rowing Championships in Lucerne, Switzerland, in double sculls with his brother Frank; they won a silver medal beaten by a team from East Germany. At the 1975 World Rowing Championships in Nottingham, the Hansen brothers won the world championship title in the double sculls. In 1976, the brothers won a gold medal at the Montreal Olympic Games in the same boat class. At the 1977 World Rowing Championships, Hansen competed in the single sculls and came tenth. The brothers would then return to double sculls and win the 1978 and 1979 World Championships. Unfortunately the Norwegian Rowing Federation boycotted the Moscow Olympics in 1980, so the brothers were unable to defend their Olympic title. Frank officially retired after the Moscow Olympics.

Alf Hansen continued his career and teamed up with Rolf Thorsen in the double sculls. At the 1981 World Rowing Championships in Munich, Germany, they won a bronze medal. At the 1982 World Rowing Championships in Lucerne, Switzerland, they became world champions. At the 1983 World Rowing Championships in Duisburg, Germany, they won a silver medal. At the 1984 Summer Olympics in Los Angeles they came tenth.

At the 1986 World Rowing Championships, Hansen and Thorsen were both part of the Norwegian quad scull team that came ninth; their team members were Vetle Vinje and Lars Bjønness. At the 1987 World Rowing Championships, the same team won a silver medal. The four stayed together and competed at the 1988 Summer Olympics in Seoul where they won Olympic silver.

At the 1989 World Rowing Championships in Bled, Hansen was part of a newly-composed quad scull team; they came sixth. Hansen ended his professional career after the 1991 World Rowing Championships at the age of 43.

In 1974 Alfs first Child, Kenneth Gavoll Hansen was born and five years later was his sister Bettina Bang-Hansen.

== Awards ==
The Hansen brothers were awarded the Aftenposten Gold Medal after their world championship win in 1975; it is one of the highest awards that are awarded within Norwegian sport. After their 1976 Olympic gold, the Hansen brothers were awarded the Fearnley award. In 1990, Alf Hansen was the inaugural recipient of the Thomas Keller Medal. The medal is given by the International Rowing Federation (FISA) for an outstanding international career in the sport of rowing as well as exemplary sportsmanship. It is the highest honour in rowing.
