= Yuriy Zelikovich =

Soviet rower

Personal information
- Nationality: Soviet
- Born: 7 May 1964 (age 60)

Sport
- Sport: Rowing

Yuriy Zelikovich (born 7 May 1964) is a Soviet rower. He competed in the men's quadruple sculls event at the 1988 Summer Olympics.
