= Jens Köppen =

East German rower (born 1966)

Personal information
- Born: 6 January 1966 (age 60) Kyritz, Bezirk Potsdam, East Germany
- Spouse: Kathrin Boron

Sport
- Sport: Rowing
Medal record
Representing East Germany
Rowing at the Summer Olympics
Bronze medal – third place	1988 Seoul	Quad sculls
World Rowing Championships
Silver medal – second place	Hazewinkel 1985	Quad sculls

Jens Köppen (born 6 January 1966 in Kyritz, East Germany) is a German rower, who competed for the SG Dynamo Potsdam / Sportvereinigung (SV) Dynamo. He won medals at international rowing competitions. He is married to the rower Kathrin Boron.
