= Pavel Krupko =

Soviet rower

Personal information
- Nationality: Soviet
- Born: 24 April 1967 (age 59) Tiraspol, Moldovian SSR, Soviet Union

Sport
- Sport: Rowing
Medal record
Representing Soviet Union
Summer Universiade
Silver medal – second place	1987 Zagreb	Quadruple sculls

Pavel Ivanovich Krupko (born 24 April 1967) is a Soviet rower. He competed in the men's quadruple sculls event at the 1988 Summer Olympics.
