= Mirosław Mruk =

Polish rower

Personal information
- Nationality: Polish
- Born: 11 February 1962 (age 64) Starzyny, Poland

Sport
- Sport: Rowing
Medal record
Representing Poland
World Championships
Silver medal – second place	1986 Nottingham	Quadruple sculls
Summer Universiade
Gold medal – first place	1987 Zagreb	Quadruple sculls

Mirosław Mruk (born 11 February 1962) is a Polish rower. He competed in the men's quadruple sculls event at the 1988 Summer Olympics.
