= Ferenc Dózsa =

Hungarian rower

Personal information
- Nationality: Hungarian
- Born: 6 October 1967 (age 57); Budapest, Hungary

Sport
- Sport: Rowing

Ferenc Dózsa (born 6 October 1967) is a Hungarian rower. He competed in the men's quadruple sculls event at the 1988 Summer Olympics.
