= Charlie Altekruse =

American rower

Personal information
- Nationality: American
- Born: August 28, 1958 (age 67)

Sport
- Sport: Rowing

Charlie Altekruse (born August 28, 1958) is an American rower. He competed in the men's quadruple sculls event at the 1988 Summer Olympics. He graduated from Harvard University.
