= Steffen Zühlke =

German rower and Olympic bronze medalist

Personal information
- Born: 28 April 1965 (age 61) Schwerin, East Germany
- Height: 1.98 m (6 ft 6 in)
- Weight: 98 kg (216 lb)

Sport
- Sport: Rowing
- Club: SC Dynamo Berlin
Medal record
Men's rowing
Representing East Germany
Olympic Games
| Bronze medal – third place | 1988 Seoul | Quadruple sculls |
World Rowing Cup
| Bronze medal – third place | 1990 Mannheim | Single sculls |
Summer Universiade
| Gold medal – first place | 1987 Zagreb | Single sculls |

Steffen Zühlke (born 28 April 1965) is a German rower who won one bronze Olympic medal in the quadriple sculls during the 1988 Summer Olympics in Seoul as well as one more in the World Rowing Cup II in Mannheim.

Furthermore, he participated in the World Rowing Junior Championships in Vichy, France in 1983 where he won a silver medal at the age of 18.

Zühlke is currently living in Unterhaching, Germany.
