= Per Sætersdal =

Norwegian rower (born 1964)

Medal record

Men's rowing

Representing Norway

Olympic Games
Silver medal – second place	1992 Barcelona	Quadruple sculls

World Championships
Bronze medal – third place	1990 Tasmania	Lwt single sculls

Per Albert Sætersdal (born 18 May 1964) is a Norwegian competition rower and Olympic medalist.

He received a silver medal in quadruple sculls at the 1992 Summer Olympics in Barcelona, together with Kjetil Undset, Lars Bjønness, and Rolf Thorsen.
