= Heiko Habermann =

East German rower

Medal record

Men's rowing

Representing East Germany

Olympic Games
Bronze medal – third place	1988 Seoul	Quadruple sculls

Friendship Games
Silver medal – second place	1984 Moscow	Single sculls

Heiko Habermann (born 2 November 1962 in East Berlin, East Germany) is a German rower.
