= Ferenc Hompóth =

Hungarian rower

Personal information
- Nationality: Hungarian
- Born: 22 February 1968 (age 57); Budapest, Hungary

Sport
- Sport: Rowing

Ferenc Hompóth (born 22 February 1968) is a Hungarian rower. He competed in the men's quadruple sculls event at the 1988 Summer Olympics.
