= Sławomir Cieślakowski =

Polish rower

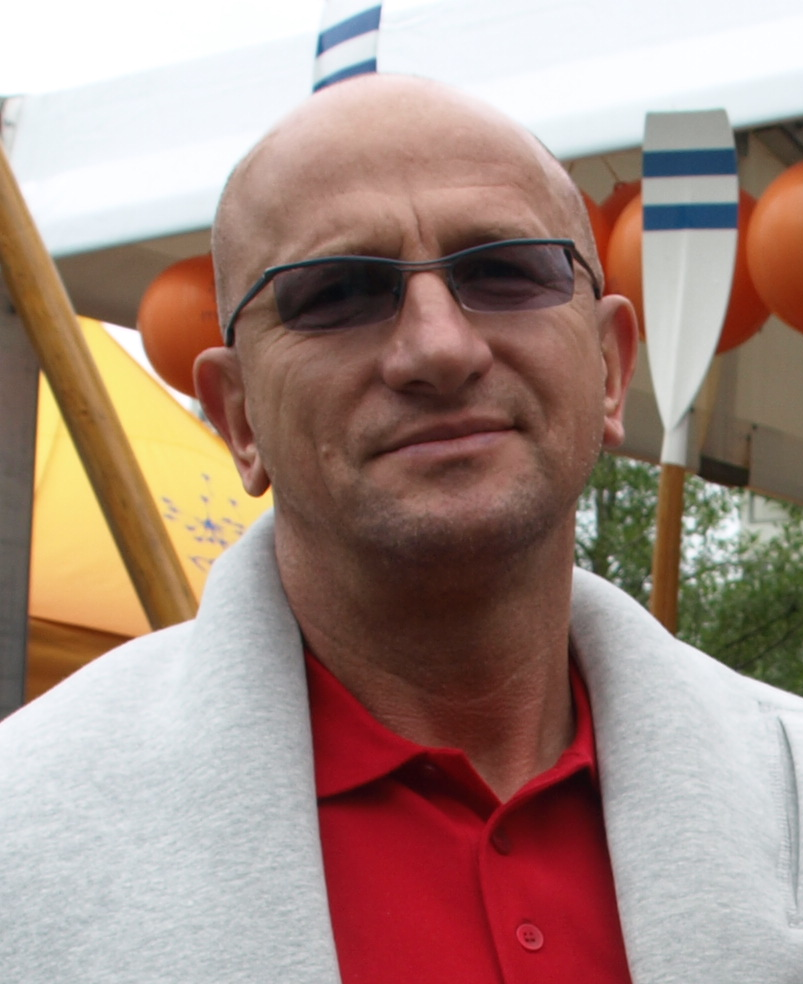
- Sławomir Cieślakowski in 2015

Personal information
- Nationality: Polish
- Born: 2 May 1961 (age 65) Warsaw, Poland

Sport
- Sport: Rowing
Medal record
Representing Poland
World Championships
Silver medal – second place	1986 Nottingham	Quadruple sculls
Summer Universiade
Gold medal – first place	1987 Zagreb	Quadruple sculls

Sławomir Zdzisław Cieślakowski (born 2 May 1961) is a Polish rower. He competed in the men's quadruple sculls event at the 1988 Summer Olympics.
