= Andreas Reinke (rower) =

German rower

Personal information
- Full name: Andreas Matthias Reinke
- Nationality: German
- Born: 3 December 1962 (age 62); Braunschweig, Germany

Sport
- Sport: Rowing

Andreas Matthias Reinke (born 3 December 1962) is a German rower. He competed in the men's quadruple sculls event at the 1988 Summer Olympics.
