= Zoltán Molnár (rower) =

Hungarian rower

Personal information
- Nationality: Hungarian
- Born: 4 April 1961 (age 63); Budapest, Hungary

Sport
- Sport: Rowing

Zoltán Molnár (born 4 April 1961) is a Hungarian rower. He competed in the men's quadruple sculls event at the 1988 Summer Olympics. He coaches his son, Bendegúz Pétervári-Molnár, who is also an Olympic rower. The sprint canoeist Pál Pétervári is his brother-in-law.
