= Jürgen Nelis =

Dutch rower

Personal information
- Nationality: Dutch
- Born: 21 October 1964 (age 60); Eindhoven, Netherlands

Sport
- Sport: Rowing

Jürgen Nelis (born 21 October 1964) is a Dutch rower. He competed in the men's quadruple sculls event at the 1988 Summer Olympics.
