= Jack Frackleton =

American rower

Personal information
- Nationality: American

Sport
- Sport: Rowing

Jack Frackleton is an American rower. He competed in the men's quadruple sculls event at the 1988 Summer Olympics. He is an alumnus of University of Massachusetts Amherst.
