= Hans Kelderman =

Dutch rower (born 1966)

Medal record

Men's rowing

Representing the Netherlands

World Rowing Championships
Gold medal – first place	1989 Bled	M4x
Bronze medal – third place	1991 Vienna	M4x

Hans Kelderman (born 22 March 1966 in Zutphen) is a Dutch rower. He took part in the Olympic Games of 1988 and 1992 in the quadruple sculls, and won the gold medal in the quadruple sculls in the 1989 World Championships, together with Rutger Arisz, Koos Maasdijk and Herman van den Eerenbeemt.
