= Rolf Thorsen =

Norwegian rower (born 1961)

Personal information
- Born: Rolf Bernt Thorsen; 22 February 1961 (age 65) Zürich, Switzerland
- Height: 191 cm (6 ft 3 in)
- Weight: 90 kg (198 lb)

Sport
- Country: Norway
- Sport: Rowing
- Club: Horten RK
Medal record
Men's rowing
Olympic Games
Silver medal – second place	1988 Seoul	Quadruple sculls
Silver medal – second place	1992 Barcelona	Quadruple sculls
World Rowing Championships
Gold medal – first place	1982 Luzern	Double sculls
Gold medal – first place	1989 Bled	Double sculls
Gold medal – first place	1994 Indianapolis	Double sculls
Silver medal – second place	1983 Duisburg	Double sculls
Silver medal – second place	1993 Račice	Double sculls
Bronze medal – third place	1981 Munich	Double sculls

Rolf Bernt Thorsen (born 22 February 1961) is a Norwegian former competition rower, world champion and Olympic medalist. He is a recipient of the Morgenbladet Gold Medal and the Thomas Keller Medal. Outside sports, he has assumed various leading administrative positions in the construction business.

== Personal life ==
Thorsen was born in Zürich, Switzerland, on 22 February 1961, and is a brother of Espen Thorsen.

== Sports career ==
Thorsen received a silver medal in quadruple sculls at the 1988 Summer Olympics in Seoul, together with Alf Hansen, Vetle Vinje, and Lars Bjønness. He also received a silver medal in quadruple sculls at the 1992 Summer Olympics in Barcelona, together with Kjetil Undset, Per Sætersdal, and Lars Bjønness. Thorsen is three times world champion in double sculls. In 1982 together with Alf Hansen, in 1989 with Lars Bjønness, and again in 1994 with Lars Bjønness.

Thorsen has been president for the Norwegian Rowing Federation in the period from 2000 to 2010, and also a board member of Særforbundenes Fellesorganisasjon.

He was awarded the Morgenbladet Gold Medal in 1989, and the Thomas Keller Medal in 1996.

== Business career ==
A construction engineer by education, Thorsen was managing director of NCC Property Development, a major commercial property developer across the Nordics from 2007 to 2014. 2014–2019 he was managing director for Oslo S Utvikling AS, a major developer of commercial and residential property in Norway. 2019–2021 he was CEO for the listed (Oslo Børs) residential developer Selvaag Bolig ASA. Thorsen is CEO of the Norwegian real estate company Polaris Eiendom AS.

Thorsen was one of the founding fathers of The Norwegian Green Building Council, that created and owns a nationised version of the environmental certification scheme BREEAM (BREEAM-NOR), and he headed the organisation as chair of the board of directors for 5 years (2014 - 2019). Thorsen is member of the board of directors at NP Bygg AS, Agaia AS and the Norwegian National Opera and Ballet.
