= Vetle Vinje =

Norwegian rower and geophysicist

Medal record

Men's rowing

Representing Norway

Olympic Games
Silver medal – second place	1988 Seoul	Quadruple sculls

World Championships
Silver medal – second place	1987 Copenhagen	Quadruple sculls

Vetle Vinje (born 14 March 1962) is a Norwegian competition rower and Olympic medalist.

He competed in the men's coxed pair event at the 1984 Summer Olympics. He received a silver medal in quadruple sculls at the 1988 Summer Olympics in Seoul, together with Alf Hansen, Rolf Thorsen, and Lars Bjønness. Vinje received a silver medal in quadruple sculls in the 1987 world championships, with the same team.

He represented the club Bærum RK. He is a son of Finn-Erik Vinje and is married to politician Kristin Vinje.

Vinje has a cand.scient. degree from 1989 and a dr.scient. degree from 1999, both in geophysics, from the University of Oslo.
