= Paul Douma =

Canadian rower

Personal information
- Born: November 21, 1962 (age 63) St. Catharines, Ontario

Sport
- Sport: Rowing
Medal record
Men's rowing
Representing Canada
World Rowing Championships
Gold medal – first place	1985 Hazewinkel	Quad scull

Paul Douma (born November 21, 1962) is a Canadian rower. He won a gold medal at the 1985 World Rowing Championships in Hazewinkel with the men's quadruple sculls.
