= Lars Bjønness =

Norwegian rower (born 1963)

Personal information
- Born: July 27, 1963 (age 62) Oslo, Norway
- Occupation: rower
- Height: 192
Medal record
Men's rowing
Representing Norway
Olympic Games
Silver medal – second place	1988 Seoul	Quadruple sculls
Silver medal – second place	1992 Barcelona	Quadruple sculls
World Championships
Gold medal – first place	1989 Bled	Double sculls
Gold medal – first place	1994 Indianapolis	Double sculls
Silver medal – second place	1987 Copenhagen	Quadruple sculls
Silver medal – second place	1993 Račice	Double sculls

Lars Bjønness (born 27 July 1963) is a former Norwegian competition rower and Olympic medalist.

He received a silver medal in quadruple sculls at the 1988 Summer Olympics in Seoul, together with Alf Hansen, Vetle Vinje, and Rolf Thorsen.

He also received a silver medal in quadruple sculls at the 1992 Summer Olympics in Barcelona, together with Kjetil Undset, Per Sætersdal, and Rolf Thorsen.

== Career ==
In 1983, Bjønness joined the Norwegian quad scull. He participated in several World Rowing Championships, and won gold in 1985, bronze in 1986 and silver 1987. The crew, which also consisted of Alf Hansen, Vetle Vinje and Rolf Thorsen, also participated at the 1988 Olympics in Seoul. In that competition, the Norwegian team won both the opening and the semi-final, lost the final to Italy, and secured the silver medal by winning against the East German team.

After the 1988 Olympics, Bjønness turned to double scull, where he rowed together with Thorsen. They won the World Rowing Championships in 1989. For the 1992 Olympics in Barcelona, the pair returned to quad scull and was joined by Kjetil Undset and Per Sætersdal. The Norwegian team won their opening and qualified for the final with a second placed in the semi-final behind Italy. They finished behind the German team, and thus gained the silver medal.

After the 1992 Olympics, Thorsen and Bjønness turned again to double scull, where they won a silver medal in 1993 World Cup and a gold in 1994. Bjønness ended his international career after winning the gold medal with Thorsen in the 1995 World Cup.
