= Claudio Guindón =

Argentine rower

Personal information
- Nationality: Argentine
- Born: 22 December 1963 (age 61)

Sport
- Sport: Rowing

Claudio Guindón (born 22 December 1963) is an Argentine rower. He competed at the 1984 Summer Olympics and the 1988 Summer Olympics.
