= Mel LaForme =

Canadian rower

Melvin LaForme
Personal information
- Born: February 6, 1953 (age 73) Buffalo, New York

Sport
- Sport: Rowing
Medal record
Men's rowing
Representing Canada
World Rowing Championships
Gold medal – first place	1985 Hazewinkel	Quad sculls
Pan American Games
Gold medal – first place	1983 Caracas	Quad sculls

Melvin LaForme (born February 6, 1953) is a Canadian rower.

== Biography ==
LaForme was born in Buffalo, New York in 1953. He represented Canada in the men's eight at the 1976 Summer Olympics in Montreal, where the team finished eighth. He won a gold medal at the 1985 World Rowing Championships in Hazewinkel with the men's quadruple sculls. He represented Canada in the quad scull at the 1988 Summer Olympics.
