= Rubén D'Andrilli =

Argentine rower

Personal information
- Nationality: Argentine
- Born: 8 October 1962 (age 62)

Sport
- Sport: Rowing

Rubén D'Andrilli (born 8 October 1962) is an Argentine rower. He competed at the 1984 Summer Olympics and the 1988 Summer Olympics.
