= Jiří Jakoubek =

Czech rower

Personal information
- Nationality: Czech
- Born: 25 February 1960 (age 65); Brno, Czechoslovakia

Sport
- Sport: Rowing

Jiří Jakoubek (born 25 February 1960) is a Czech rower. He competed in the men's quadruple sculls event at the 1988 Summer Olympics.
