= Oleksandr Zaskalko =

Ukrainian rower

Medal record

Men's rowing

Representing Ukraine

World Rowing Championships
Silver medal – second place	1993 Račice	M4x
Silver medal – second place	1994 Indianapolis	M4x
Silver medal – second place	1999 St. Catharines	M4x
Bronze medal – third place	1997 Aiguebelette	M4x

Oleksandr Ivanovych Zaskalko (Ukrainian: Олександр Іванович Заскалько; born 15 April 1967 in Dnipropetrovsk) is a Ukrainian rower. He competed in the 1988, 1996 and 2000 Olympics.

== Biography ==
Oleksandr Zaskalko was born in Dniepropetrovsk, where he began to engage in academic rowing during his school years. During his military service, he was a member of the local ASC(Army Sports Club).

At the 1988 Olympic Games, Zaskalko, as part of the Soviet team, finished fourth among quad sculls.

After the dissolution of the Soviet Union, he performed under the flag of Ukraine. In 1993 and 1994, he took silver in quad sculls at the World Championships. In 1995, he was fourth in the quad sculls' competition.

At the 1996 Olympics, he took seventh place as part of the quad sculls' team (including Leonid Shaposhnikov, Mykola Chupryna, Oleksandr Zaskalko and Oleksandr Marchenko).

During 1997–2000, performing as a part of quad scull(including Leonid Shaposhnikov, Oleg Lykov, Oleksandr Zaskalko and Oleksandr Marchenko), Zaskalko was the winner and multiple-time medalist of the World Cup stages: he took bronze medal at the 1997 World Championship, and silver at the 1999 World Championship.

At the 2000 Olympics, Zaskalko's team became sixth among the double sculls. Since then, Zaskalko quit professional sport and started coaching.
