= Agostino Abbagnale =

Italian rower (born 1966)

Personal information
- Nationality: Italian
- Born: 25 August 1966 (age 59) Pompei, Italy
- Height: 1.88 m (6 ft 2 in)
- Weight: 96 kg (212 lb)

Sport
- Country: Italy
- Sport: Rowing
- Club: G.S. Fiamme Gialle
Medal record
Men's rowing
Representing Italy
Olympic Games
Gold medal – first place	1988 Seoul	Quadruple scull
Gold medal – first place	1996 Atlanta	Double scull
Gold medal – first place	2000 Sydney	Quadruple scull
World Championships
Gold medal – first place	1997 Aiguebelette	Quadruple Scull
Gold medal – first place	1998 Cologne	Quadruple Scull
Silver medal – second place	1985 Hazewinkel	Eight
Silver medal – second place	2002 Seville	Double Scull

Agostino Abbagnale (born 25 August 1966) is an Italian rower and triple Olympic gold medalist. He is the younger brother of multiple Olympic medalists Carmine Abbagnale and Giuseppe Abbagnale.

== Early life and family ==
Abbagnale was born in the hamlet of Messigno, Pompei, into the rowing dynasty headed by his elder brothers Giuseppe and Carmine. He began training on the Sarno river under their uncle-coach Giuseppe La Mura and by 19 had stroked the Italian eight to silver at the 1985 World Rowing Championships in Hazewinkel.

== Career ==
=== Breakthrough and Seoul 1988 ===
Selected for the men's quadruple sculls at the 1988 Summer Olympics in Seoul, Abbagnale joined Gianluca Farina, Piero Poli and Davide Tizzano to win Italy's first Olympic sculling title in a time of 5 m 43.40 s, only minutes after his brothers triumphed in the coxed pair.

After the medal ceremony, Abbagnale, who is a poor swimmer, jumped into the rowing lake and landed on one of his partners Davide Tizzano, knocking the gold medal out of his hand. It took scuba divers two days to recover the missing medal.

=== Health setback and comeback ===
Weeks later he was diagnosed with deep-vein thrombosis linked to a congenital protein-C deficiency, forcing a five-year hiatus from competition. In 2000 coach-physician Giuseppe La Mura explained that lifetime anticoagulant therapy made banned substances "a lethal combination" for the rower, rebutting doping rumours.

Abbagnale returned to the Olympic stage at the 1996 Summer Olympics in Atlanta, teaming with Davide Tizzano to win the Gold in the double scull (2x).

=== World titles and Sydney 2000 ===
Switching back to the quad, he claimed consecutive world championships in 1997 (Aiguebelette) and 1998 (Cologne).

At the 2000 Summer Olympics in Sydney he, Rossano Galtarossa, Alessio Sartori and Simone Raineri won in 5 m 45.56 s, the last Italian rowing gold of the 20th century.

Persistent recurrences of thrombosis forced his retirement in 2003.

== Post-competitive career and honours ==
Abbagnale became a national junior coach and technical consultant for the Italian Rowing Federation. In 2006, he was awarded the Thomas Keller Medal, given by FISA, the governing board for international rowing. The Thomas Keller Medal is awarded for an outstanding career in international rowing. Abbagnale's brothers Carmine and Giuseppe had been awarded the Thomas Keller Medal in 1997.

== Achievements ==
- Olympic Medals: 3 Gold
- World Championship Medals: 2 Gold and 2 Silver.
- Thomas Keller Medal Awarded in 2006 for an outstanding career in international rowing.

=== Olympic Games ===
- 2000 – Gold, Quadruple Scull
- 1996 – Gold, Double Scull
- 1988 – Gold, Quadruple Sculls

=== World Championships ===
- 2002 – Silver, Double Scull
- 1999 – 7th, Quadruple Scull
- 1998 – Gold, Quadruple Scull
- 1997 – Gold, Quadruple Scull
- 1995 – 13th, Double Scull
- 1987 – 11th, Quadruple Scull
- 1985 – Silver, Eight

== Legacy ==
Italian media routinely describe him as “il più grande canottiere italiano di tutti i tempi,” the greatest Italian oarsman of all time, citing both his longevity and his pioneering fight against serious illness.

== See also ==
- List of multiple Olympic gold medalists
- Italian men gold medalist at the Olympics and World Championships
