= Martin Tichý =

Czech rower

Personal information
- Nationality: Czech
- Born: 13 July 1968 (age 56); Byškovice (part of Neratovice), Czechoslovakia

Sport
- Sport: Rowing

Martin Tichý (born 13 July 1968) is a Czech rower. He competed in the men's quadruple sculls event at the 1988 Summer Olympics.
