= Davide Tizzano =

Italian rower (1968–2025)

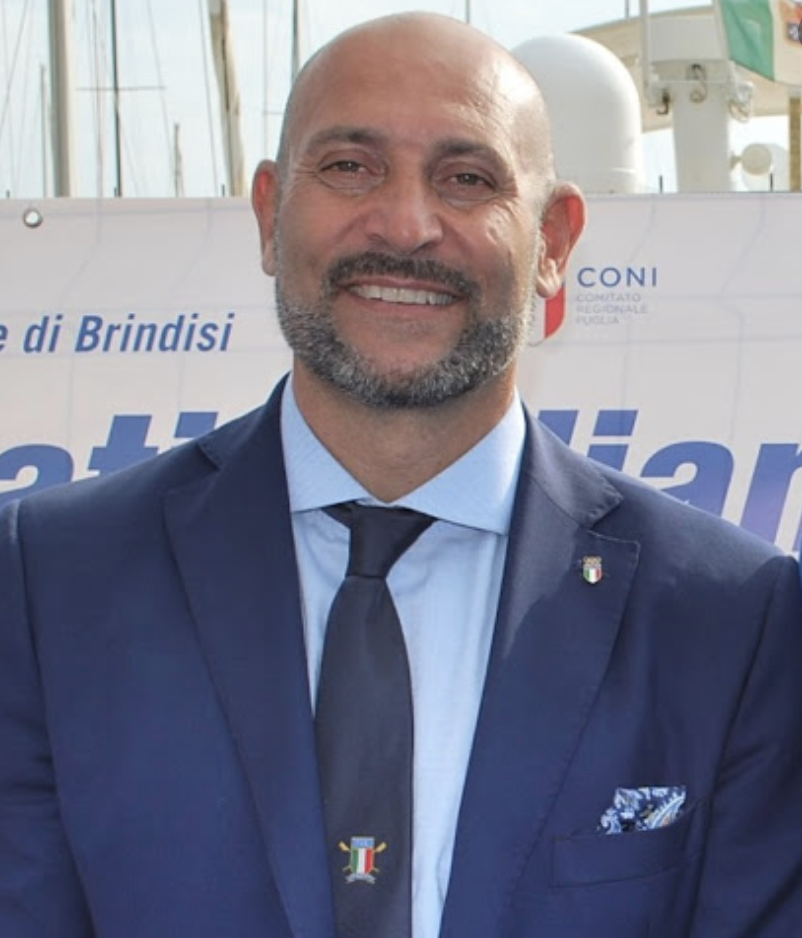
- Tizzano in 2021

Personal information
- Born: 21 May 1968 Naples, Italy
- Died: 29 December 2025 (aged 57) Naples, Italy
Medal record
Men's rowing
Representing Italy
Olympic Games
Gold medal – first place	1988 Seoul	Quadruple sculls
Gold medal – first place	1996 Atlanta	Double sculls

Davide Tizzano (21 May 1968 – 29 December 2025) was an Italian rower and a double Olympic gold medalist. He won his first gold medal at the 1988 Summer Olympics in Seoul, in the quadruple sculls. Eight years later he formed a team with Agostino Abbagnale, with whom he triumphed in the men's double sculls event. He participated in two editions of the America's Cup, competing with Il Moro Challenge in 1992 and Mascalzone Latino in 2007. He served as president of Italian Rowing Federation from November 2024 till his death.

Tizzano died on 29 December 2025, at the age of 57.

== Sources ==
- RAI Profile
