= Andrzej Krzepiński =

Polish rower

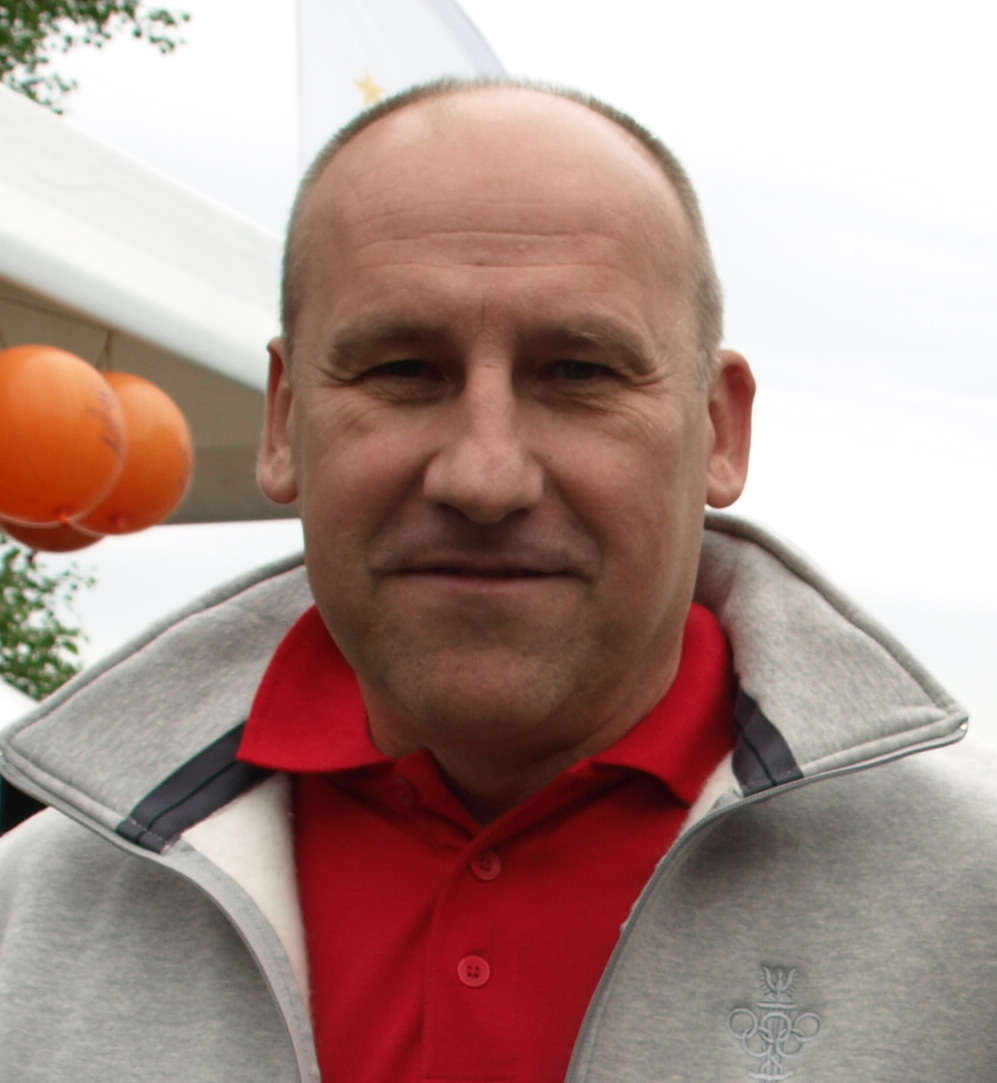
- Andrzej Krzepiński in 2015

Personal information
- Nationality: Polish
- Born: 17 July 1963 (age 63) Warsaw, Poland

Sport
- Sport: Rowing
Medal record
Representing Poland
World Championships
Silver medal – second place	1986 Nottingham	Quadruple sculls
Summer Universiade
Gold medal – first place	1987 Zagreb	Quadruple sculls

Andrzej Bohdan Krzepiński (born 17 July 1963) is a Polish rower. He competed at the 1988 Summer Olympics and the 1992 Summer Olympics.
