= Marcelo Fernández (rower) =

Argentine rower

Personal information
- Nationality: Argentine
- Born: 13 February 1967 (age 58)

Sport
- Sport: Rowing

Marcelo Fernández (born 13 February 1967) is an Argentine rower. He competed in the men's quadruple sculls event at the 1988 Summer Olympics.
