= Herman van den Eerenbeemt =

Dutch rower (born 1962)

Personal information
- Born: 12 August 1962 (age 63) Amsterdam

Sport
- Sport: Rowing
Medal record
Men's rowing
Representing the Netherlands
World Rowing Championships
Gold medal – first place	1989 Bled	Quad scull

Herman van den Eerenbeemt (born 12 August 1962) is a Dutch rower. He won a gold medal at the 1989 World Rowing Championships in Bled with the men's quadruple sculls.
