= Richard Powell (rower) =

Australian rower

Personal information
- Full name: Richard “Sponge” Powell
- Nationality: Australian
- Born: 9 December 1960 (age 65) brisbane
- Children: 4

Sport
- Sport: Rowing
Medal record
Men's rowing
Representing Australia
Commonwealth Games
Silver medal – second place	1986 Edinburgh	Single scull

Richard Powell (born 9 December 1960) is an Australian rower. He competed at the 1988 Summer Olympics and the 1992 Summer Olympics.

Richard attended Brisbane Grammar School, graduating in 1978.

Richard now coaches rowing at Brisbane Grammar School and All Hallows School. He coached the All Hallows’ School 1st VIII to their first victory in 23 years at the 2023 BSRA Head of the River.

Richard is married and is a father of 4 children (Harry, Phoebe, Georgia and Sam).
