= Italian Rowing Federation =

Sports governing body in Italy

Federazione Italiana Canottaggio
- Sport: Rowing
- Jurisdiction: Italy
- Founded: 1888
- Affiliation: World Rowing Federation
- Headquarters: Turin
- Location: Italy
- President: Giuseppe Abbagnale

Official website
- www.canottaggio.org

The Italian Rowing Federation (Italian: Federazione Italiana Canottaggio, FIC) is the national governing body for rowing in Italy. The FIS is currently based in Turin. The FIC was founded in 1888.

Since 2012, the president of the federation is Olympic legend Giuseppe Abbagnale.

== See also ==
- Italy national rowing team
