= Václav Chalupa =

Czech rower

Václav Chalupa Jr.
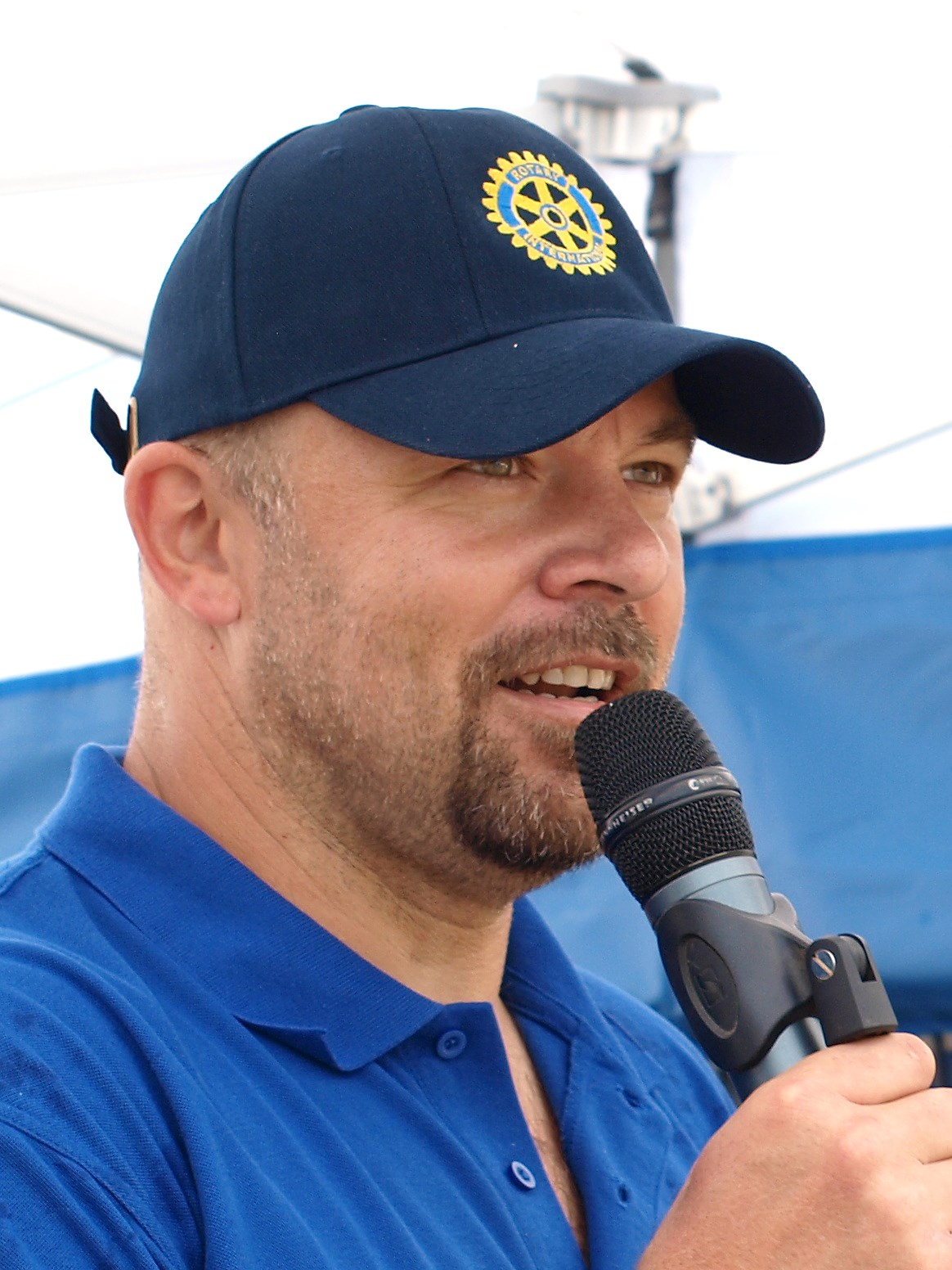

Personal information
- Born: 7 December 1967 (age 58) Jindřichův Hradec, Czechoslovakia
- Height: 194 cm (6 ft 4 in)
- Weight: 96 kg (212 lb)
- Relatives: Václav Chalupa (father)
Medal record
Men's rowing
Representing Czechoslovakia
Olympic Games
| Silver medal – second place | 1992 Barcelona | Single scull |
World Rowing Championships
| Silver medal – second place | 1989 Bled | M1x |
| Silver medal – second place | 1990 Tasmania | M1x |
| Silver medal – second place | 1991 Vienna | M1x |
Representing the Czech Republic
World Rowing Championships
| Silver medal – second place | 1993 Račice | M1x |
| Silver medal – second place | 2009 Poznań | M2+ |
| Bronze medal – third place | 1995 Tampere | M1x |
| Bronze medal – third place | 1998 Cologne | M1x |
| Bronze medal – third place | 2001 Lucerne | M1x |
European Rowing Championships
| Gold medal – first place | 2007 Poznań | M8+ |

Václav Chalupa Jr. (born 7 December 1967) is a Czech rower who competed at six consecutive Olympics from 1988 to 2008, winning a silver medal in 1992 behind Germany's Thomas Lange in the single scull.

== Career ==
His first coach was his father Václav Chalupa Sr., who competed at the 1960 and 1964 Olympics and reestablished the only rowing club in their small town when he was thirteen. From 1989 until 2004 he was coached by Zdeněk Pecka.

He rowed at sixteen world championships. In the single scull, he came second at four consecutive meets from 1989 to 1993, and third in 1995, 1998, and 2001 (when just 0.7 seconds separated the top three rowers). At his final world championships in Poznan, he came second in the coxed pairs.

He came first at the 1990 Goodwill Games in the single sculls, at three World Cup events in 1991, 1993, and 1999, and at the Hackett Thames World Sculling Challenge in 2000.

He is a captain in the Czech army and a skilled repairman of agricultural machinery.

It is estimated that he has rowed 60 000 km in his career. He is a fan of fellow rowers Thomas Lange and Steve Redgrave, and of Mr. Bean.

His oldest son Václav (born 1994) is also a rower.

He set a record time when winning the Diamond Challenge Sculls, rowing for Dukla Praha, at the Henley Royal Regatta in 1989, with a time of 7.23 min.

== See also ==
- List of athletes with the most appearances at Olympic Games

Awards
| Preceded by Jüri Jaanson | Thomas Keller Medal; 2012 | Succeeded by Eskild Ebbesen |
