= Peter Antonie =

Australian rower (born 1958)

Personal information
- Full name: Peter Thomas Antonie
- Born: 11 May 1958 (age 68) Melbourne, Victoria
- Height: 182 cm (6 ft 0 in)
- Weight: 76 kg (168 lb)

Sport
- Country: Australia
- Sport: Rowing
- Event: Sculler
- Club: Melbourne University Boat Club
Medal record
Men's rowing
Representing Australia
Olympic Games
Gold medal – first place	1992 Barcelona	M2X
World Rowing Championships
Gold medal – first place	1986 Nottingham	LM1X
Silver medal – second place	1977 Amsterdam	LM4-
Silver medal – second place	1983 Duisburg	LM8
Bronze medal – third place	1978 Copenhagen	LM4-
Bronze medal – third place	1990 Lake Barrington	M2X
Commonwealth Games
Gold medal – first place	1986 Edinburgh	LM1X
Silver medal – second place	1994 Ontario	M2X

Peter Thomas Antonie OAM (born 11 May 1958) is an Australian former rower. He is an Olympic and Commonwealth games gold medallist and world champion. He is regarded as one of Australia's greatest ever rowers figuring in senior representative squads consistently from 1977 to 1996 and representing Australia on eighteen occasions at three Olympics and fifteen World Rowing Championships. He competed at the highest levels as both a sculler and a sweep oarsman, in both lightweight and open divisions, across all boat classes. He won twenty-nine Australian national championship titles in his career.

== Club and state rowing ==
Born in Melbourne, Victoria, and educated at Xavier College, Antonie's senior rowing was done from the Melbourne University Boat Club. Antonie was a long serving president of the Melbourne University Boat Club.

Starting out as sweep rower Antonie was selected in the Victorian state representative lightweight four to race the Penrith Cup at the Australian Rowing Championships for four consecutive years 1977 to 1980. Those crews won the interstate championship in 1977 and 1978. At the national championships at those same regattas, Antonie raced for the Melbourne University Boat Club in a lightweight four in 1977, 1978 and 1980. They won the national title in 1977 and 78. At each national championship from 1977 to 1980 he backed up to race in an MUBC lightweight eight, winning in 1978 and 1980.

By 1981 Antonie had switched to sculling and representing the MUBC he raced for the national Australian lightweight sculling title at the Australian Rowing Championships for six consecutive years from 1981. He won that national title on four occasions.

While still an eligible lightweight (max 72.5 kg) by the mid 1980s Antonie was racing at Australian Rowing Championships in all sculling boats against lightweight or open competitors. In 1987 he managed to win three national sculling titles – stroking a quad scull, a double scull and solo in the lightweight single scull. He demonstrated his versatility the following year stroking the Victorian heavyweight men's eight to a King's Cup victory. From 1990 to 1992 he was the Victorian state representative picked to race the President's Cup (open heavyweight single scull) at the Australian Rowing Championships. He won the interstate championship for Victoria in 1991.

From 1977 to 1997 but excepting 1996, Antonie raced at every Australian Rowing Championships and won at least one national title every year. In total he won twenty-nine national championship titles in nine different boat classes.

== National representative rowing ==
Between the commencement of his senior rowing career in 1977 and his final Olympic appearance in 1996, Antonie rowed for Australia every year excepting 1980 and 1995 at the top-level world regatta available for his weight division.

=== World championships ===
Antonie was first selected for Australian representative honours in a LM4- for the Amsterdam 1977 which won silver. The following year that crew with bowman Colin Smith replaced by Vaughan Bollen raced at the Copenhagen 1978 and took bronze. He was in an Australian lightweight eight at Bled 1979; a lightweight double scull at Munich 1981; and in lightweight eights at Lucerne 1982, Duisburg 1983 and Montreal 1984.

He was picked to row the lightweight single scull for Hazelwinkel 1985 and the following year in the same event, Antonie finally won gold and a World Championship title at Nottingham 1986. At Copenhagen 1987 he came fifth in that same event.

By Bled 1989 Antonie was racing in a heavyweight double scull with Paul Reedy. They paired again to race the same event at Lake Barrington 1990 winning a bronze medal. He was picked as Australia's heavyweight sculler for Vienna 1991 delivering a credible fourth place. Then at Raoudnice 1993 and Indianapolis 1994 Antonie made his final World Championship appearances for Australia racing a heavyweight double scull.

=== Olympics ===
Antonie's first Olympic appearance was at Seoul 1988 where he stroked the quad to fifth place. In 1992 again competing in the open division he won Olympic gold with Stephen Hawkins in the men's double scull at the Barcelona Olympics. He made a third Olympic appearance at Atlanta 1996 again in a double scull. Antonie was selected as an Olympic games reserve for Sydney 2000.

== Accolades ==
On 26 January 1987, Antonie was awarded the Order of Australia Medal in recognition of services to rowing.

He was inducted into the Sport Australia Hall of Fame in 1998, and in 2000, he was awarded the Australian Sports Medal for rowing achievements.

In 2003 the International Rowing Federation awarded Antonie the Thomas Keller Medal for his outstanding international rowing career. It is the sport's highest honour and is awarded within five years of the athlete's retirement, acknowledging an exceptional rowing career and exemplary sportsmanship.

In 2010 he was inducted as a member of the Rowing Victoria Hall of Fame.
