= Britannia Yacht Club =

Private social club in Ottawa, Ontario, Canada

Coordinates: 45°22′20″N 75°48′01″W

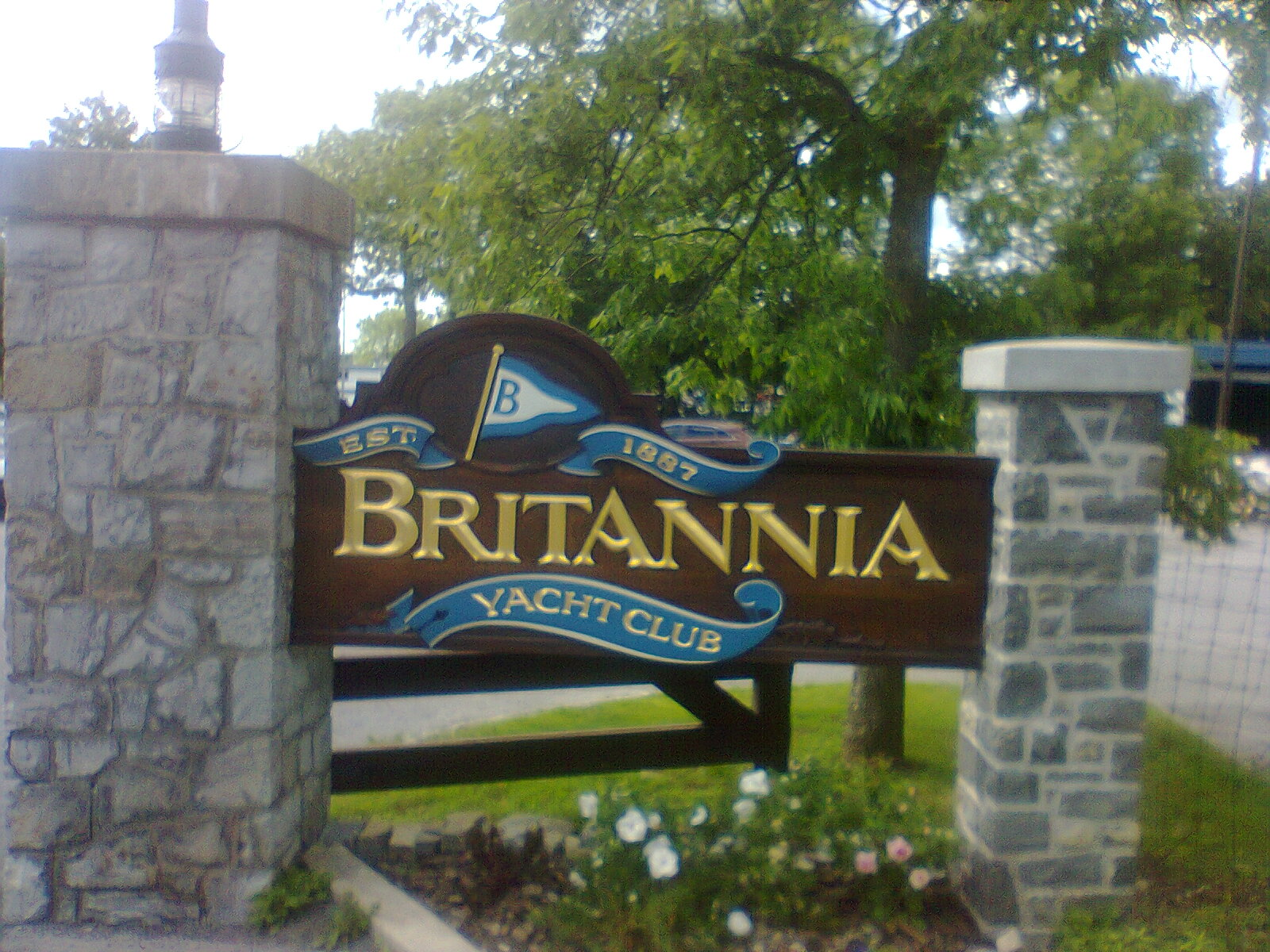
- Britannia Yacht Club gates
- Abbreviation: BYC
- Formation: 1887
- Legal status: active
- Location: 2777 Cassels Street, Ottawa, Ontario, Canada
- Official language: English, French
- Commodore: Rob Braden
- Affiliations: Advantage Boating; Canadian Canoe Association, Canadian Dinghy Association, Canadian Power and Sail Squadrons, Canadian Yachting Association, Armdale Yacht Club, Bay of Quinte Yacht Club, Dartmouth Yacht Club, Dobson Yacht Club, Island Yacht Club, Kingston Yacht Club, National Press Club, Nepean Sailing Club, Oakville Yacht Squadron, Pointe-Claire Yacht Club, Queen City Yacht Club (Toronto), Rockcliffe Yacht Club, Royal Canadian Yacht Club, Royal Hamilton Yacht Club, Royal Lake of the Woods Yacht Club, Royal Nova Scotia Yacht Squadron, Royal St. Lawrence Yacht Club, Royal Vancouver Yacht Club, Tennis Canada
- Website: www.byc.ca%20byc.ca

The Britannia Yacht Club (BYC) is a private social club, yacht club, and tennis club based in Britannia, a neighbourhood in Ottawa, Ontario, Canada. It was founded in 1887 by a group of cottagers.

The BYC is located on an extension of land at the eastern end of Lac Deschênes, near the Deschênes Rapids on the Ottawa River. A land block owned by the National Capital Commission on the south side of the harbor is leased to the BYC. The area immediately south of the property is occupied by residences of Britannia Bay. The harbor was built from an abandoned power canal, which now lays beside the club property, and has been expanded twice since its original development. The harbor's water level is controlled by a system of stop logs at its entrance.

The BYC is a member of the Ontario Sailing Association, Canadian Power and Sail Squadrons, and the Canadian Yachting Association. Its officers include a Commodore, Vice-Commodore, Rear-Commodore, Secretary, and Treasurer.

== Description ==
The BYC is included in the City of Ottawa Inventory of Sports facilities. BYC provides access to 45 kilometers of sailing waters on the Ottawa River. Canadian Hydrographic Service Chart 1550 - Britannia Bay to Chats Falls covers the whole of Lac Deschênes.

The BYC offers Social and boating memberships to close to 1,200 members. BYC has a marina with a main and inner Harbor which accommodate 280 Keelboats. For Dinghy sailing, dry sail facilities are provided. BYC offers Tennis, youth and social programs.

At Sherwood Port, the entry to its harbor, a plaque was erected in honor of Hon. Justice Lilius Anglin Sherwood (1923–2002), magistrate (1960) provincial judge (1968–83) and federal court judge (1988–93), sailor and international sailing judge. The Main Harbor, which opens to the Ottawa River, is surrounded by Mauve Cove, Crimson Cove, and Blue Lagoon. The Inner Harbor is surrounded by Emerald Cay, Mauve Cove and Crimson Cove. Onshore there is a perimeter reserved for the exclusive use of members as well as camping on Baskin's beach. The Clubhouse's dragon sailboat bar, Main Lounge, Bruce Neuk, Sunset Room restaurant and marquis tent provide casual and gourmet dining and social areas. Fuller Park is a popular social area for picnics.

== Gardens ==
The BYC has extensive Perennial gardens, Wildflower gardens, Waterways and Walkways with many plantings reflecting the blue and white club colors.

== History ==
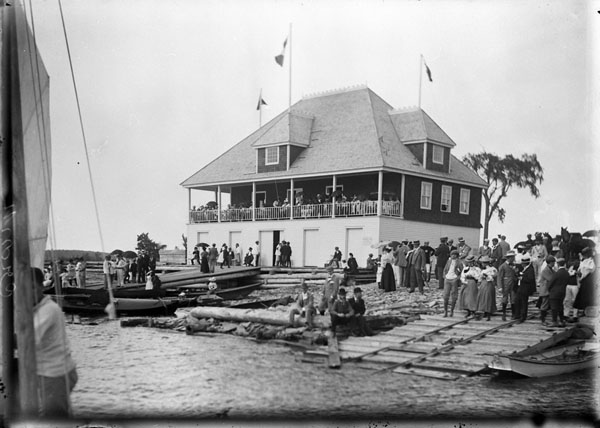
Britannia Boating Club now Britannia Yacht Club 1896 by William James Topley

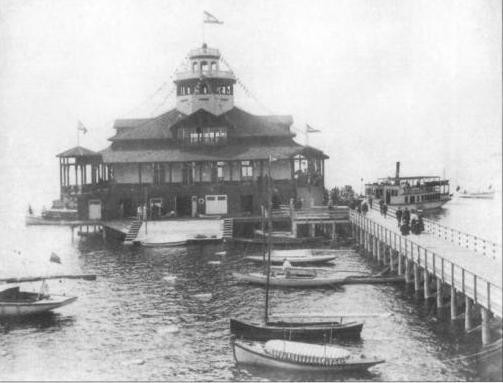
Designed by Charles Kivas Band (architect) the Britannia Boating Club House c 1906–5 on the pier.

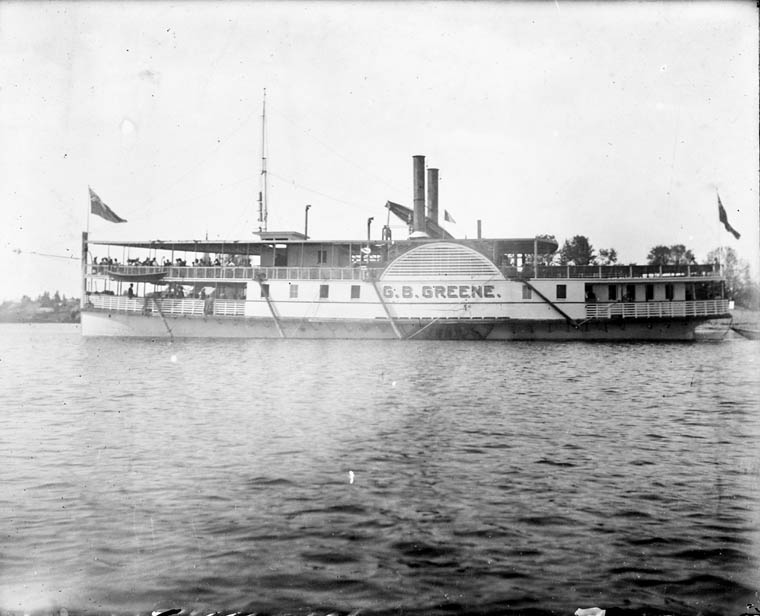
Steamer GB Greene (1896–1945), Ottawa River, by James Ballantyne

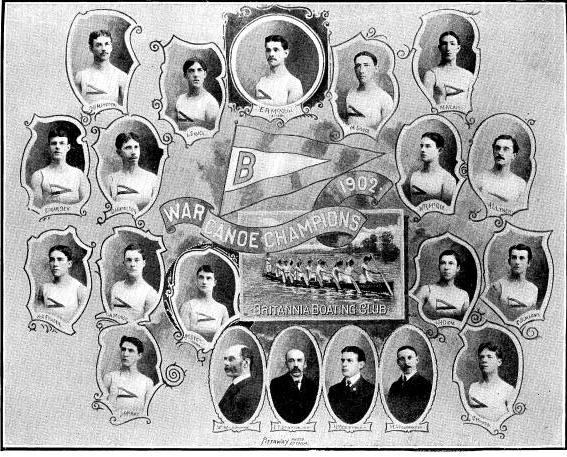
Britannia War Canoe Champions 1902

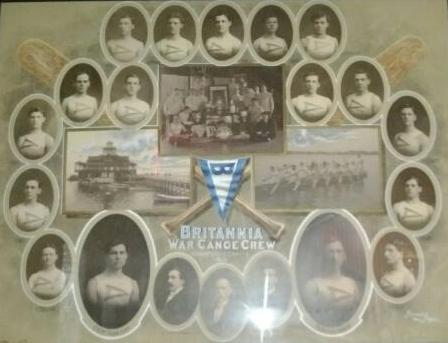
Britannia Boat Club war canoe crew c 1906 at Britannia Yacht Club

By the 1830s, steamboats traveled for 10 or 11 months a year 48 kilometers up the Ottawa River from the Deschênes Rapids to the foot of the Rapids des Chats. The log drives, which resulted in 16-foot logs lying along the waterfront, ended in 1982.

By the 1870s, Britannia Village was a summer resort for people who lived in Ottawa, Ontario. In the 1870s, rails were laid towards the capital, linking the waterfront of Britannia Township, Woodroffe and Westboro. By 1871, Britannia Township consisted of a flag station of the Canadian Central Railway (CCRR), farmland, a few houses, shops, a mill and a Methodist church.

=== Britannia Aquatic Club ===
The Britannia Aquatic Club (BAC) was founded c. 1887 using a converted sawmill, cottages and boat storage built by John Cameron Jamieson, a lumberman, baker, and alderman as its headquarters.

=== Britannia Nautical Club ===
In 1892, the Britannia Aquatic Club (BAC) changed its name to the Britannia Nautical Club (BNC), still using a converted Mill built in 1880–85 by John Cameron Jamieson as its headquarters. On August 29, 1891, the BNC held its first regatta which included sailing, paddling and rowing races. The mandate of the Club was to foster all kinds of water sports, and to hold regattas, sailing races, canoe, rowing and log rolling events.

=== Britannia Boat House Club ===
In 1895 the Britannia Boat House Club was granted an Act of Incorporation by Judge Ross. The board of directors consisted of Thomas H Kirby, C Jackson Booth, E.L. Brittain, Arthur Tache and William Wyld. In 1895, the Club ran its first annual regatta. In 1896 the Britannia Nautical Club changed its name to the Britannia Boat House Club.

The Edward Miall award for Junior Members who show improvement in their ability was founded in memory of three brothers, Alexander (22), Walter (19) and Eddy (16) Brothy and Peter Winfield (10), who drowned on July 26, 1895. Edward Miall, whose son Ray was rescued three hours later still clinging to his father's capsized skiff, sought to stress all-round proficiency in hope of presenting such tragedy in future. The B.Y.C. Photographic Archives' six oldest known pictures show a group of people sailing towing a bun, man in a cockpit, regatta etc. c. 1895 by Charter member, E. L. Brittain.

After the club outgrew the old mill building, the present club house designed by Edgar Lewis Horwood was opened in 1896 on the present site, on a leased property owned by lumber baron J.R. Booth, closer to the Deschênes Rapids. A photo of the Britannia Club House, 1896 by William James Topley is in the Library and Archives Canada collection.

The G.B. Greene, known as 'Queen of the River', a double-decked side-wheeler steamer built by the Upper Ottawa Improvement Company in 1896, took up to 250 passengers up the Ottawa River to Chats Falls on daily pleasure excursions. Although she was dismantled in 1946, her anchor remains at Britannia Beach today.

On August 21, 1897, the Club won the third annual regatta. In 1898, Britannia Boat House Club's War Canoe beat a team crewed by the Ottawa Canoe Club to win the Canadian National Canoe Championship. This race was re-enacted as part of the BYC 125th celebrations on Saturday June 16, 2012.

In 1899, the Ottawa Electric Railway Company privately financed and built a double street-car Britannia line from Holland Avenue, which was in operation from 1900 to 1959 with off-peak service of 5 cars per hour to Britannia. Since the street-car operated on Sundays, its recreational developments at Britannia were profitable. Large numbers of people took the Britannia-on-the Bay street-car each summer from 1900 to the Second World War to a combined waterfront amusement park, summer resort and commuter village. In 1899, the Metropolitan Power Company was formed to construct a powerhouse just north of the Britannia Boathouse Club with a 2000-foot canal to extend to the lower end of the Deschenes Rapids. Although the hydroelectric project was abandoned as unfeasible, the unfinished canal was used in 1951 by Past Commodores Thomas G. Fuller and Reginald G. Bruce with labor provided by volunteer Club members as the basis of the BYC protected harbor. Today, the BYC harbor provides 250 wet moorings, fuel and pump out facilities, for both sail and power boats. In the late 1800s upon the death of a Charter member and custodian of the club records, E. Stockton, the administrators of his affairs sent the documents to the Township dump.

The Britannia Boat House Club was one of nine co-founders of the Canadian Canoe Association (CCA) in 1900. In 1900, Britannia Boathouse Club won the War canoe and the canoe race at the regatta hosted by Britannia. In 1900, the Club logo consisted of cross paddles and a burgee. A photo of the Britannia Bay Club House c. 1900 by Harmer William Morell is in the Library and Archives Canada Collection. The Club hosted the CCA championships in 1902, 1908, 1911 and 1935.

On June 6, 1902, Lewis Skuce, 15, saved the lives of a young man and lady who were rowing across the head of the Deschaines rapids when their oar-lock broke and their craft began drifting towards the rapids. Lewis Skuce paddled out to the drifting boat, transferred the couple into his canoe and conveyed them to shore while Charlie Scott and Wilfrid Harrison rescued the deserted rowboat.

Designed by Charles Penruddocke William Kivas Band, architect and partner in Architectural & Engineering Co., a new clubhouse, known as the Britannia Boating Club House was built on the pier by Thomas Ahearn, head of the Ottawa Electric Railway in 1905–06. The old Club House building was used for storage.

=== Britannia Boating Club ===
In 1905, the Britannia Boathouse Club was renamed the Britannia Boating Club; the activities covered racing and the use of practically all types of boats. In May 1906, the Department of Agriculture registered Industrial Design number 11 folio 2455 by the Britannia Boat House Club, for use in club pins, jewellery, stationery, flags, badges and emblems.

The Edwin L. Brittain Trophy was first presented in 1905; It was originally and is currently awarded for a race from the Britannia Yacht Club to Pinhey's Point and return - Elapsed Time.

In the years before the First World War, the Ottawa Citizen's 'News from Ottawa's Beautiful Resorts' or 'Restful Resorts around the Capital' regularly featured stories about summer life in Britannia; Typical articles described social visits, recreation, fireworks, bonfires, bands, stage performances, singing, storytelling, water sports, regattas, and flotillas of boats and canoes.

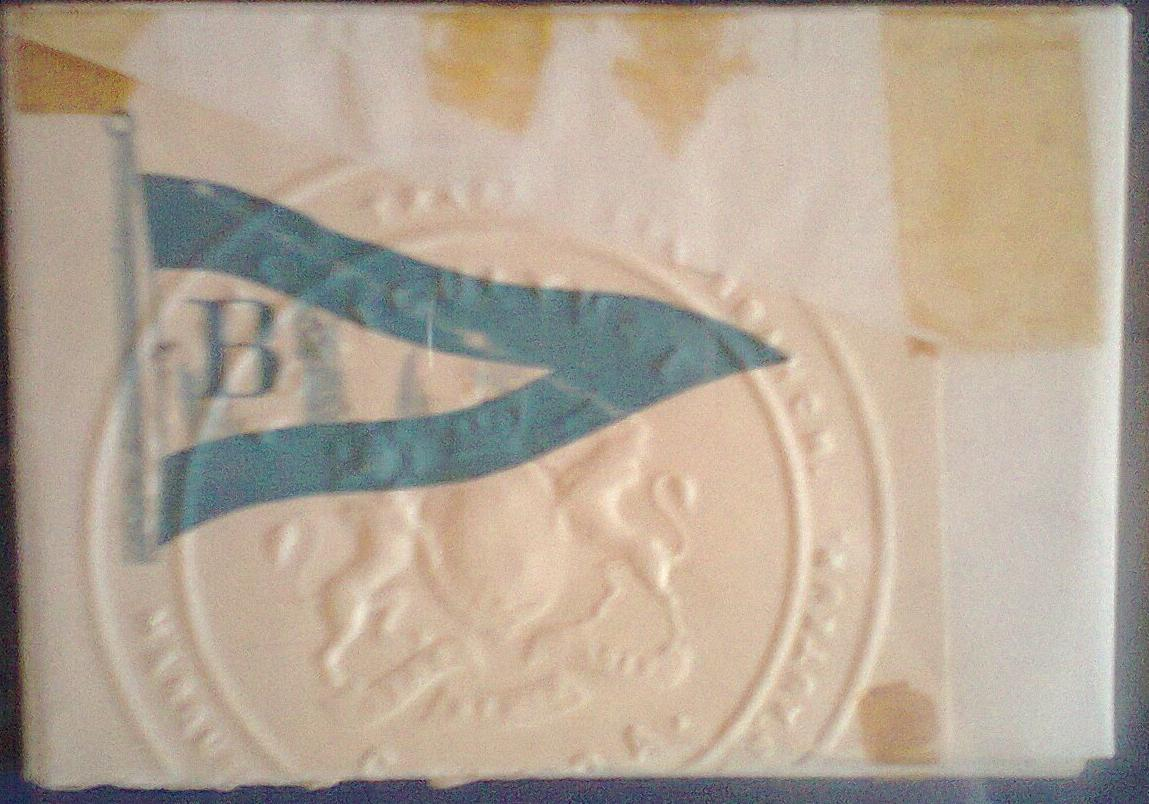
Britannia Boating Club industrial design 1906

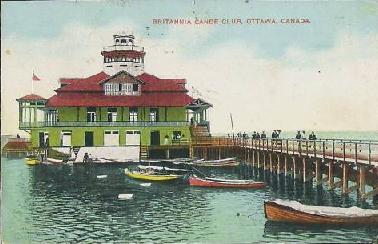
Postcard of the Britannia Boating Club House c 1905–6 on the pier designed by Charles Kivas Band (architect)

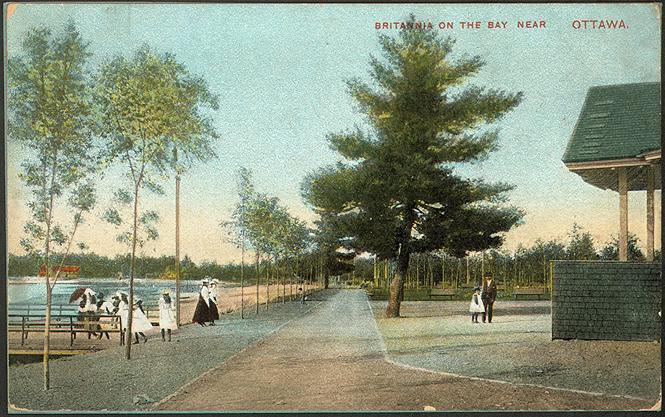
Britannia On The Bay near Ottawa 1910, Britannia Boating Club & pier

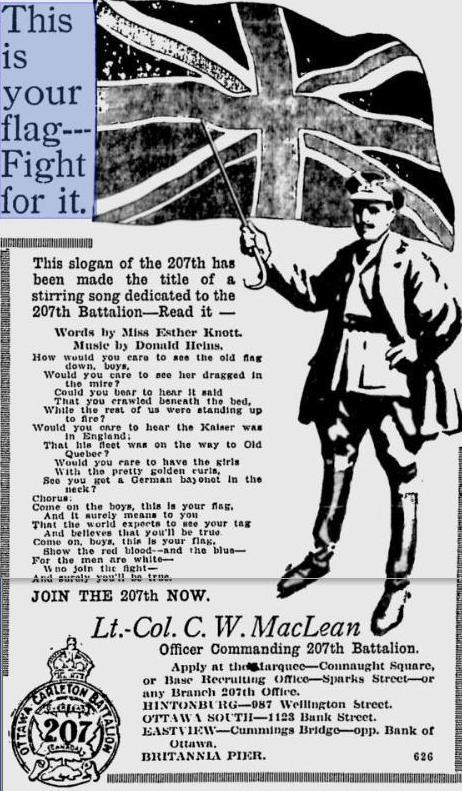
Britannia Boating Club provides recruiting site and entertainment for the 207th (Ottawa-Carleton) Battalion, CEF

A photo by Lawrence Hurt Sitwell dated April 20, 1907, of an ice jam and the wreck of the new club house from the front is in the Library and Archives Canada collection.

In 1908, the Ottawa Association of Aquatic Clubs (OAAC) was founded. Lists of members who were in good standing and lists of members who were suspended were submitted to the OAAC. The executive consisted of Chair E.A. Oliver of the Victoria Yacht Club; Vice Chair Q.A. Lamb of Ottawa Canoe Club and Secretary J.M. Douglas of Britannia Boating Club.

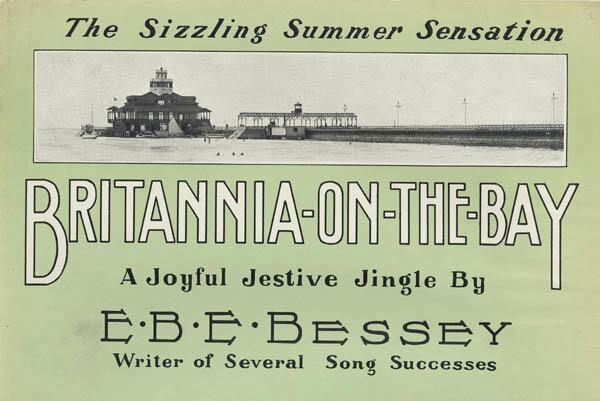
Britannia On The Bay by E B E Bessey 1909, Britannia Boating Club & pier

In July 1910, Jack Fee's Britannia Fours (Fee, McKenzie, Harrison & Carnochan) won the Dickson trophy (Junior 4s rowing -city championships), which was donated by J.P. Dickson at a regatta on Lake Deschenes before a record crowd of 500. Mr Roderick Percy Sparks, then president of the Britannia Boating Club, announced that the four rowers would compete in the Canadian Henley Regatta at St. Catharines, Ontario, in August 1910.

Housing shortages in and around the capital during First World War, Great Depression in Canada and Second World War and in post-war years led to families occupying summer cottages at Britannia year-round.

During the First World War, the 207th (Ottawa-Carleton) Battalion, CEF encouraged locals to enlist at the Britannia Pier. On June 26, 1916, the Soldier's Service Club of Ottawa's programs of music, dancing and in concert attracted crowds to the Britannia Boating Club to raise money to establish amusement places in six Canadian camps that lacked entertainment halls. The crowd of thousands enjoyed musical entertainment in the auditorium, dancing to the Tippins' orchestra in the club house, band concerts in the parks and a spirit of carnival. The ladies made costumes for the minstrel show at the carnival as well as an earlier show held at the Russell Theater earlier in the season. Invitations were sent to convalescent soldiers at the Fleming home, who attended as guests of the club. This was the first carnival of its kind held in any Canadian city.

The new clubhouse, as well as canoes, accessories, boating equipment, records and trophies stored in the boathouse were destroyed by fire in 1918. The Club returned to its present location in 1920.

The J.G. Hickson Memorial Cup was first presented in 1918 to the keelboat champion in the weekly series racing (now Class 5). The Lt. Col. C. E. Long Trophy was first presented in 1919; It was originally and is currently awarded for a race between the Club and Armitage's Wharf (Elapsed Time).

The National Air Photo Library (NAPL) of Natural Resources Canada archives of aerial photographs covers the Britannia Yacht Club area; some of which date back to the 1920s. In the 1920s, Britannia Boating Club racing watercraft fleet included 'Ellen', 'Calleroo', 'Restless', 'Riona' and 'Quicksilver'.

In 1924, the Ladies Auxiliary of the Club was formed under the leadership of Mary Davis. A marine railway was built in 1925 to assist in launching and hauling boats. The BYC's inaugural tennis season was 1926 on clay tennis court. The No 1 and 2 courts on the east side of the Clubhouse were built. In 1927 four rooms were built in the area which is now the Ladies Locker room. The clubhouse was re-shingled in 1927. In 1929, a new lounge in the southwest corner of the cub-house, which is now the manager's Office, was built.

In 1929, Britannia Boating Club's water polo team swam out of the Plante Baths. The Britannia Boating Club's Basketball team were the Eastern Champions in 1928–29.

The Club avoided closure during the dark days of the early 1930s; the club did not have a single unencumbered asset during that period. In 1932, Britannia Boating Club's basketball team, the Ottawa Valley Champions, were scheduled to compete in the Dominion playdowns in Quebec, however they were unable to make the trip to Quebec for financial reasons. In 1931, the Club property was sold for arrears of taxes. A group of members purchased the property on behalf of the Club, receiving clear title from the Crown. In 1931, an addition in the North side of the Clubhouse accommodated a men's locker room and washrooms for men and women. The Club's semi-monthly booklet outlining varied water and land-based activities, known as the 'Amphibian', was founded in 1931.

On August 10, 1933, Frank Amyot rescued Ottawa Rough Riders Dave Sprague and Eddie Bond, when their canoe overturned on Lake Deschenes on June 18, 1933.

During a tempest in the region, on July 26, 1934, the railing on the long Britannia Boating Club pier was blown away and numerous trees on the grounds were felled by the sudden gale.

A photo of Britannia Yacht Club, 1935 by Clifford M. Johnston is in the Library and Archives Canada collection.

In 1936, BBC-sponsored paddler Frank Amyot gives Canada first win (1000-meter paddling) at the Olympics in Berlin. At the time, the population of Britannia Bay was 630 (1936) and 758 (1937). In 1937, the Ladies' Auxiliary presented the play, 'Good Morning Bill' at the Masonic Temple Hall in Westboro. In 1937, wood supports were built for the old pier.

Nepean Township supported plans in 1939 and 1944 for a riverfront parkway from Britannia to downtown Ottawa. In 1939, Fraser Duntile Ltd. supplied a bulldozer to dredge the area behind the Club pier. The materiel dug out was used to fill in the end of Cassels Street where the memorial flower bed is now. A masonry wall was built to retain the fill.

On August 14, 1940, Her Royal Highness Princess Alice, Countess of Athlone and her husband Alexander Cambridge, 1st Earl of Athlone, who served as Governor General of Canada from 1940 to 1946, attended an exhibition tennis match at the Britannia Boating Club.

In 1940–41, the Royal Canadian Navy Reserves scheme for training Yacht Club Members developed the first central registry system. A Royal Canadian Air Force crash launch, a 16-foot motor launch, was stationed at the Britannia Boating Club.

The Britannia Boating Club's Basketball team were the Ottawa Champions in 1941. In 1941, the bridge to the Club pier was built. The Club installed lights on two of the five tennis courts.

In 1942, with Don McDiarmid, Canadian tennis champion serving with the Royal Canadian Air Force, the traditional McDiarmid Family Tennis Tournament was cancelled for duration

Approximately 100 of Malak Karsh's photos of the Britannia Boat Club c 1940s are in the Library and Archives Canada collection. The Karsh photographs depict a race from Britannia 1940, Britannia Beach 1941, Britannia Boat Club in 1942, 1946, and 1948 and the Britannia Boating Club Construction of 1948.

On July 18, 1942, there was a meeting of 17 BBC members, in army and civilian war jobs during World War II, at Holborn Restaurant in London, England.

In 1944, the Princess Alice Barracks Cabin at Britannia Bay provided a summer home for Royal Canadian Air Force Airwomen during World War II close by the BBC's facilities for tennis, dancing and boating. Rented from the King's Daughter's Guild of Ottawa, the cabin featured 60 beds, a separate cookhouse and dining pavilion.

In 1945, the Club hosted a 50th anniversary cabaret with acts such as 'Miss Britannia', Hawaiian dance, Scottish Dances, Sailorettes and Arabs and cabaret dancers.

In 1946, the Britannia Boat Club hosted the first Canadian Dinghy Association Regatta. Exhibition tennis matches featuring tennis stars Don McDiarmid, Edgar Murphy, Eddie O'Hara and Sonia Swift marked the opening of the new lighted tennis courts at Britannia Boating Club on August 14, 1946.

In 1946, the Britannia Boating Club Memorial Park Association was formed to honour Club members killed overseas. For example, Captain Percy Royston Gilman died on June 10, 1944, one of 335 officers and men of the 3rd Canadian Division who were killed in action or died of wounds on that day.

On July 28, 1947, Club members performed 'The Reluctant Mariner', by George Orr, a takeoff of Gilbert and Sullivan's nautical comic operas such as HMS Pinafore for 400 guests at the Club Cabaret, summer social highlight.

The tower was added to the Clubhouse in 1948. In 1948, Club members performed a cabaret with acts such as Chorus Line and Potato Sack number. In 1948, Britannia Boating Club won the Ottawa Tennis Championships.

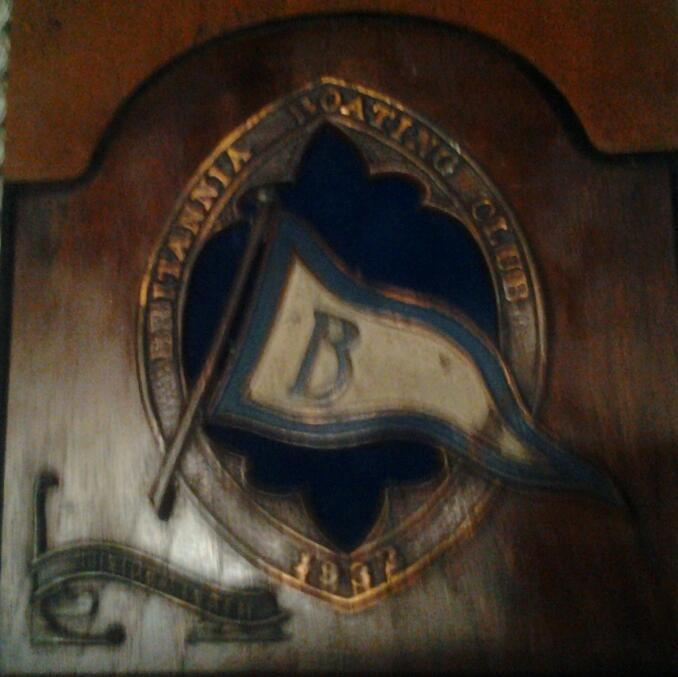
Britannia Boating Club Plaque 1932

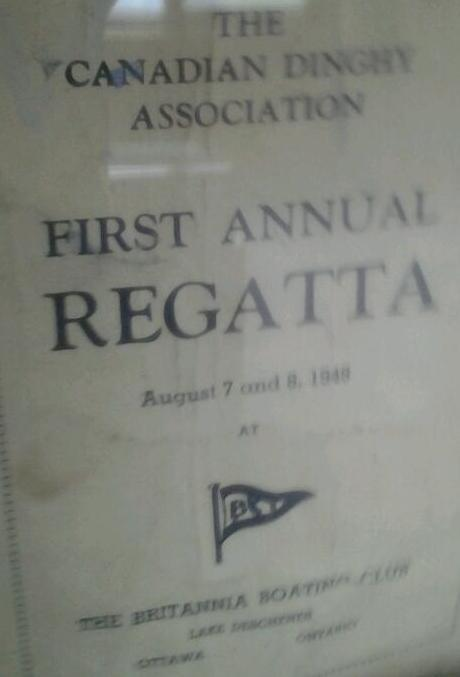
Britannia Boating Club 1st annual Canadian Dinghy Association Regatta 1948

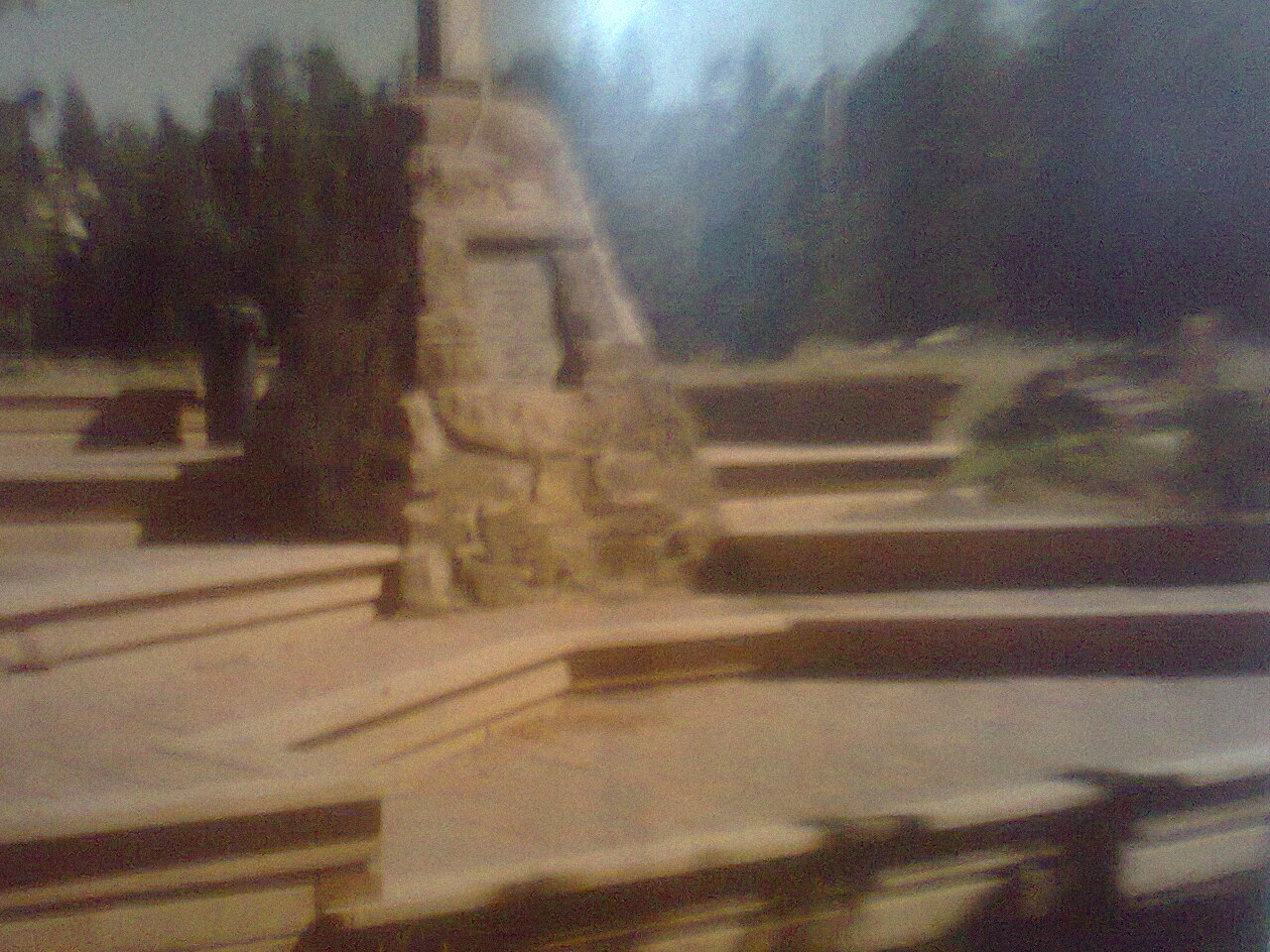
Britannia Boating Club, war memorial cairn, Baskins beach, Ottawa River

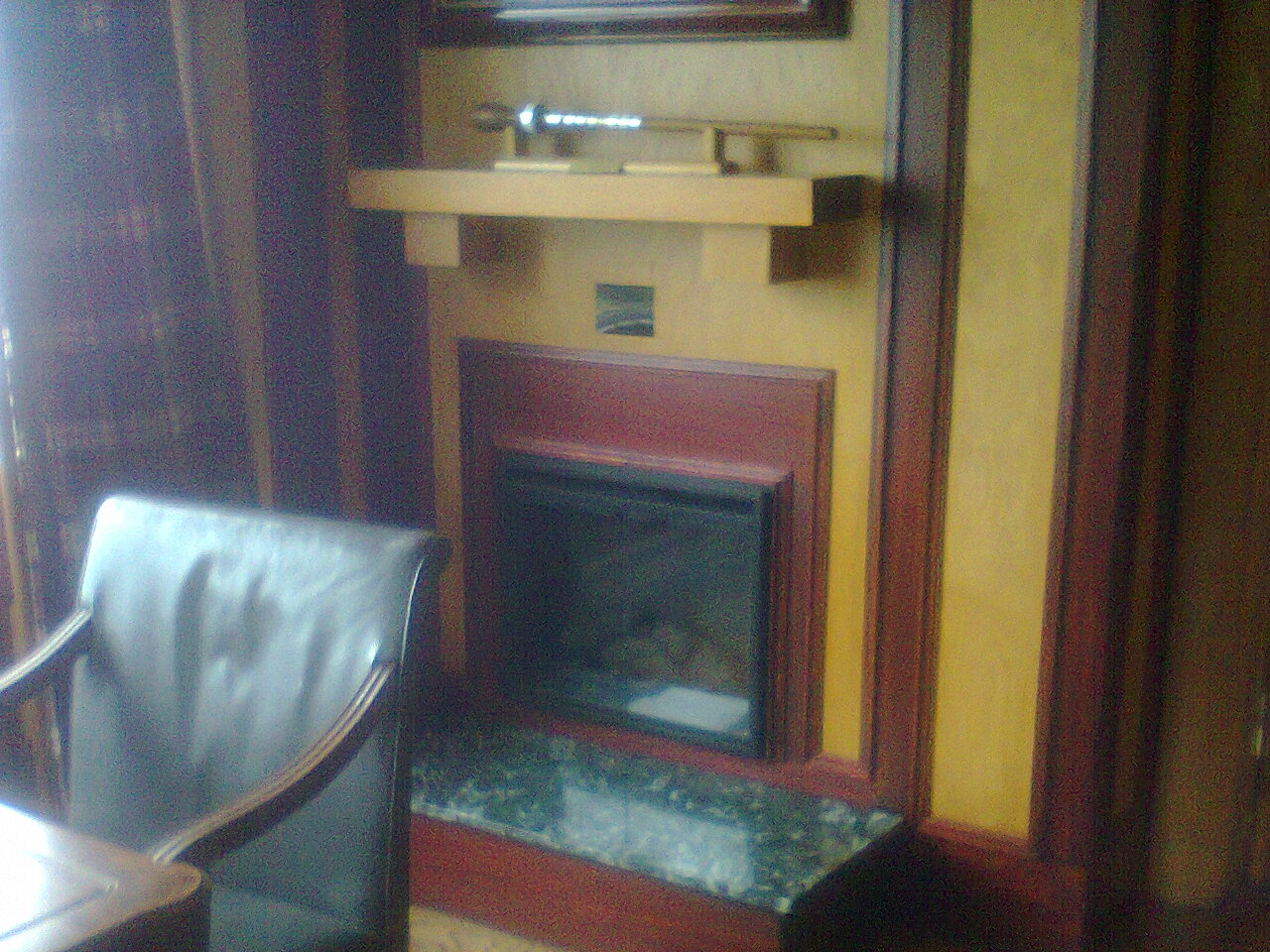
Britannia Boating Club war memorial fireplace in Commodore's Boardroom

A bronze medal ``B / Britannia Boating Club Inc.`` is in the collection of Library and Archives Canada

An acre of land was purchased at Baskin's Beach on the Ottawa River (45 28 46.6 76 00 25.7). A cairn and flagpole were erected and a brass plaque honoring fallen members was attached to the cairn. The brass plaque states, 'the Britannia Boating Club honors its members who gave their lives in his majesty's service during World War I 1914-1918 and World War II 1939-1945.' Landscaping was added in 1997. The memorial park remains a popular camping area for Club members.

The Club joined the newly organized St. Lawrence Valley Yacht Racing Association; the Club won first and second place in the Dinghy Class and won in the 14 foot international class in the first Annual St. Lawrence Valley Yacht Racing Association Regatta, held at the Pointe Claire Yacht Club in 1946.

=== The Britannia Yacht Club Inc. ===
In 1950 Ottawa annexed the western suburbs of Westboro, Woodroffe and Britannia. In 1950, the Britannia Boating Club was renamed to The Britannia Yacht Club Inc.; Competitive paddling and rowing had been abandoned in favor of sailing. The main harbour, which was built in the 1950s, used a canal built by the Ontario Electric Railway Company `s Ontario Electric Hydro Commission. In the 1950s the post of Club historian was filled by John Perdue.

In spring 1951, the water level on Lake Deschênes rose rapidly, causing flooding. The level of the dam was increased by three feet to avert the danger. Members filled sandbags around the Club property and used limestone from the Fraser Duntile Quarry to make temporary repairs.

The G.B. Patee II, (1904) a steam tug which towed booms of logs from Chats Falls to the Deschênes Rapids for 40 years, was acquired as a family brigantine in 1952 by Captain Thomas G. Fuller, known for his wartime escapades as the "Pirate of the Adriatic". The Britannia Yacht Club has used the tug, rigged as a pirate ship as known as STV Black Jack since 1983 to train young people to sail through the Bytown Brigantine Inc. On May 2, 2004, Her Excellency Adrienne Clarkson, then Governor General rechristened the brigantine Black Jack at BYC as part of the ship's centennial celebrations. A watercolor painting of G.B. Patee II, c. 1995 by Thomas Matthews is in the collection of Library and Archives Canada

In 1952, the Junior Sailing Squadron was founded. In 1952, the Club cabaret acts included Cabaret chorus girls.

In 1955, a cottage was repurposed as the Junior Clubhouse. In 1956, the Club hosted a fashion show on the south lawn.

In 1957, the Club hosted the first annual National Capital Regatta. From sailboards to keelboats, classes competing in recent years have included Laser (dinghy), Y flyer, International 14, 5O5 (dinghy), Byte (dinghy), Lightning (dinghy), 420 (dinghy), Cygnus (dinghy), Albacore (dinghy), Catamaran, Shark (keelboat), Kirby 23, etc.

In 1961, the Club cabaret acts included 'the Dearies.'

In 1964, the Britannia Yacht Club presented the Frank Amyot Memorial Trophy awarded to Junior Men C-15 Canoe Kayak Canada Canadian Sprint Canoe Kayak Championships, in loving memory of Frank Amyot, a life member of the club, Olympic Single Blade Singles C-1 Gold Medallist (1936), and distinguished member of Canada's Sports Hall of Fame.

In spring 1967, the water level on Lake Deschênes rose rapidly, causing flooding which destroyed the North side of the Club pier.

On July 3, 1967, as a Canadian Centennial project, Prince Philip, Duke of Edinburgh, Commodore of Britannia Yacht Club Thomas E Appleton, Chairman of Duke of Edinburgh Regatta committee James Craig celebrated Canadian Centennial at the Duke of Edinburgh Regatta hosted by BYC. Prince Philip flew by helicopter to the Britannia Yacht Club, where he presented the Duke of Edinburgh's trophy to the winner of the International Dragon-Class Races. Prince Philip toured the harbor aboard the African Queen.

Don S. Kirby, Club Historian, wrote a 'Historical Sketch of Britannia Yacht Club 1891-1967' as a Canadian Centennial project. The book divides the Club into five eras: the founding days; the big days at the Park pier; the fun-filled twenties; the dark days of the early Twenties; and the rebuilding of the Club to its present status.

During the 1968 North American Shark Class Sailing Championship, BYC sailor John Holmes finished 6th with crew members Dennis Foy & Jack Reeves.

In 1969, a brass plaque on the BYC harbor commemorated All the walls in this harbor were built by the physical efforts of the club members started 1 November 1951 length 1 mile completed 19 October 1968. This stone laid by Captain Thomas G. Fuller.

In 1969, a dining room was added to the clubhouse by Massey & Flanders. The senior lounge, for club members over 21 years of age, was converted into the Commodore's boardroom. In 1970, the clubhouse stairs and dining room were remodeled. In 1971, a sloping ramp was replaced with a terrace.

Ninety two burgees associated with club member's yachts were researched and painted on the perimeter of the second floor dance floor in 1971 by Commodore TE Appleton; the decorations recall this areas' previous use as a sail drying area.

All-weather tennis courts were installed in 1973.

In 1974, club members wrote a book on the history of the Britannia Yacht Club called ``Britannia Yacht Club`` (Ottawa, Britannia Yacht Club, 1974) Call number 797.106071384 B862.

In 1974, the BYC commemorated the 50th anniversary of the ladies' auxiliary.

In 1976, a group of BYC members volunteered to assist in running the 1976 Sailing Olympics in Kingston, Ontario.

In 1977, club members skated in the harbor.

During the spring flood in 1979, BYC members volunteered to line sandbags along the pier, mouth of the harbour, along circle drive, the catwalk, boat storage cradles, and along the front of the Club. The pier and gas pump area were under water.

In 1982, BYC cabaret night acts included 'Sailor girls.'

In 1983, new gates were constructed at the mouth of the BYC harbor.

In 1983, BYC hosted an 18 years and under provincial championship regatta.

In 1984, five courts were resurfaced. BYC has hosted veteran's tournaments, wheelchair tennis and junior championships.

In 1985, Club members hosted a cabaret with acts such as 'Going, Going, Gunks', 'Miss BYC', 'The Commodores', 'The Whistlers', the Tennis Group, the 'Bare Foot Contessas', 'Britannia Ahoy' and 'the Nuns'.

On October 28, 1989, The Harbormaster's Gate was dedicated In memory of Vice-Commodore Lorne E Minogue and in recognition of all members who through their voluntary efforts have contributed to the building of this club. Lorne died while performing his duties as Harbor Master in an unfortunate accident.

In 1991, the Club underwent wall construction and pier repair.

In 1994, the club's Dragon Lounge's bar on the main level of the Clubhouse was fashioned in 1994 out of a dragon sailboat named 'Magic Dragon'. According to a plaque "Magic Dragon KC55 was presented to the Britannia Yacht Club by Commodore Simon A.F. Fuller commemorating the 75th year of membership of past Commodore Thomas G. Fuller DSC, RCNVR (Rtd). Lovingly restored by the crew of Magic Dragon: Werner Thiele, David Manton, Ernest Muus, Allan Muus, James Craig, Lise Chaput, Stan Carson, Osie Blouin, Dennis Foy, David Foy, Maurice Lavoie May 6, 1994." Bruce Neuk opened as a poolroom on the main level of the Clubhouse in 1994.

In 1995, BYC celebrated its centennial weekend (1885–1995). In 1995, BYC hosted its first annual Duct tape challenge, in which boats such as 'Pontiac Pete', 'HMS Anna Nicole' and 'Duck Blind' made of cardboard and duct tape compete for best design, best battleship and seaworthiness.

A clubhouse room decorated in a Scottish tradition, Bruce Neuk, which suffered a fire in 2009, was rededicated in 2011. Rather than reopening as a pool room, which could only serve 2-3 people, it was changed into a room suitable for dining, socializing or sailing training.

In 2004, BYC was awarded the William Abbott Senior Trophy - Sail Training Program of the Year at the Canadian Yachting Association annual awards.

In 2008, the Ontario Sailing Board of Directors selected BYC as one of ten Development Training Centers where members of the Ontario Sailing Team (OST), Ontario Sailing Development Team (OSDT) and Quest for Gold Elite Team sailors train.

In spring 2011, the Club harbor gates were installed in response to the high water levels. A fixed crane, which was installed in September 2011 by the dinghy shed was used to complement the Hydraulic trailer in hauling in and out the club vessels. Harbour emergency ladders were installed at various points in the harbor. Evestrophing and stucco were installed.

A Multiyear harbor maintenance program was enacted in 2011 to cover requirements in the harbour and yard. A 5-year harbour wall repair plan by Buchan Lawton Parent engineers consists of five phases:

- Phase 1 West elevation and podium 2011.
- Phase 2 East elevation tennis court viewing podium and winding stair,
- Phase 3 Clubhouse Tower at manager's office.
- Phase 4 Remainder of north elevation tennis viewing podium and winding stair.
- Phase 5 South elevation and old main entrance.

In 2012, to celebrate the 125th anniversary of BYC, a time capsule to be opened on the Club's 200th anniversary was placed in the wall of the clubhouse, outside Bruce Neuk. A memorial plaque was installed inside the Clubhouse entrance, which was also fitted with new windows and handicapped accessible doors. A commemorative 125th plaque was installed on the Clubhouse's West Wall, which was restored and fitted with new windows, blinds and doors. Joan Yuile, Al Malo and Marc Charbonneau coauthored ``125 Years of the Britannia Yacht Club 1887-2012`` (Ottawa, Britannia Yacht Club pending 2012). Since Ottawa suffered a drought and low water levels in 2012, the BYC Harbourmaster and staff kept a close eye on moorings and the harbor to ensure that no boat was grounded and not able to sail.

The clubhouse was included amongst other architecturally interesting and historically significant buildings in Doors Open Ottawa, in 2011 and 2012.

Britannia Yacht Club Clubhouse & Marquis tent during 125th anniversary celebrations in 2012

STV Blackjack @ Britannia Yacht Club's 125th anniversary celebrations in 2012

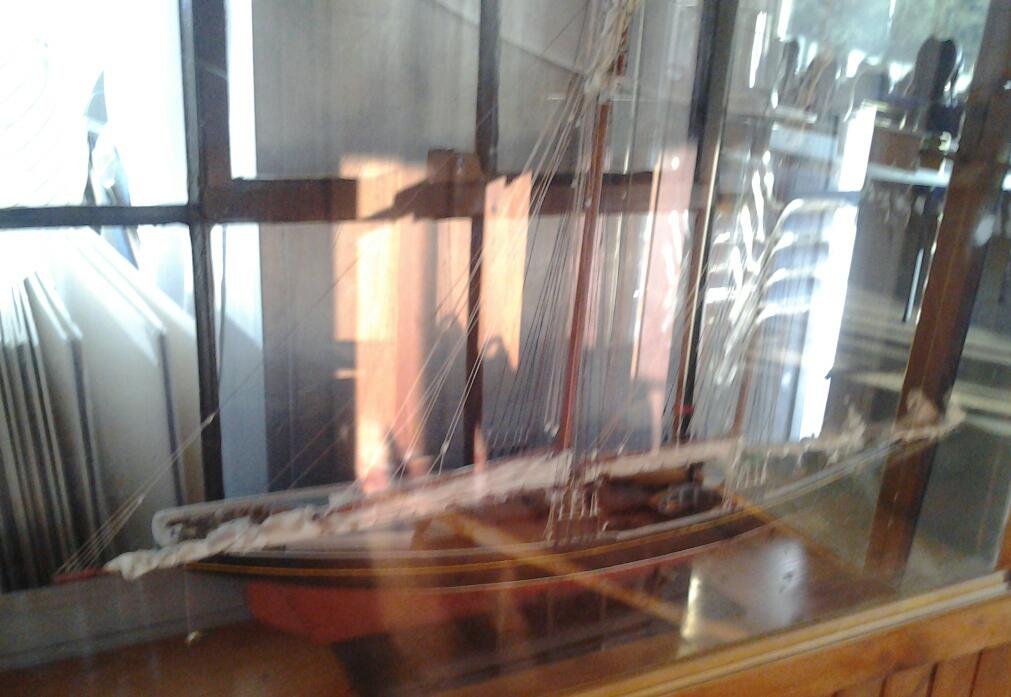
Britannia Yacht Club Model Ship of Bluenose II

== BYC Traditions ==
BYC has a collection of model yachts, including Bluenose II.

BYC Members fly the club's unique flag (triangular), called a burgee.

Annually, club members participate in the Commodore's sail past and the Commodore's ball. On Venetian night, boats in the harbor are covered in lights.

Members sing a BYC version of Rule, Britannia!

BYC club colors of Blue & White are used in the walls of the Clubhouse and outbuildings, plantings, and clothing worn by members.

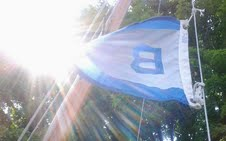
Britannia Yacht Club burgee on mast

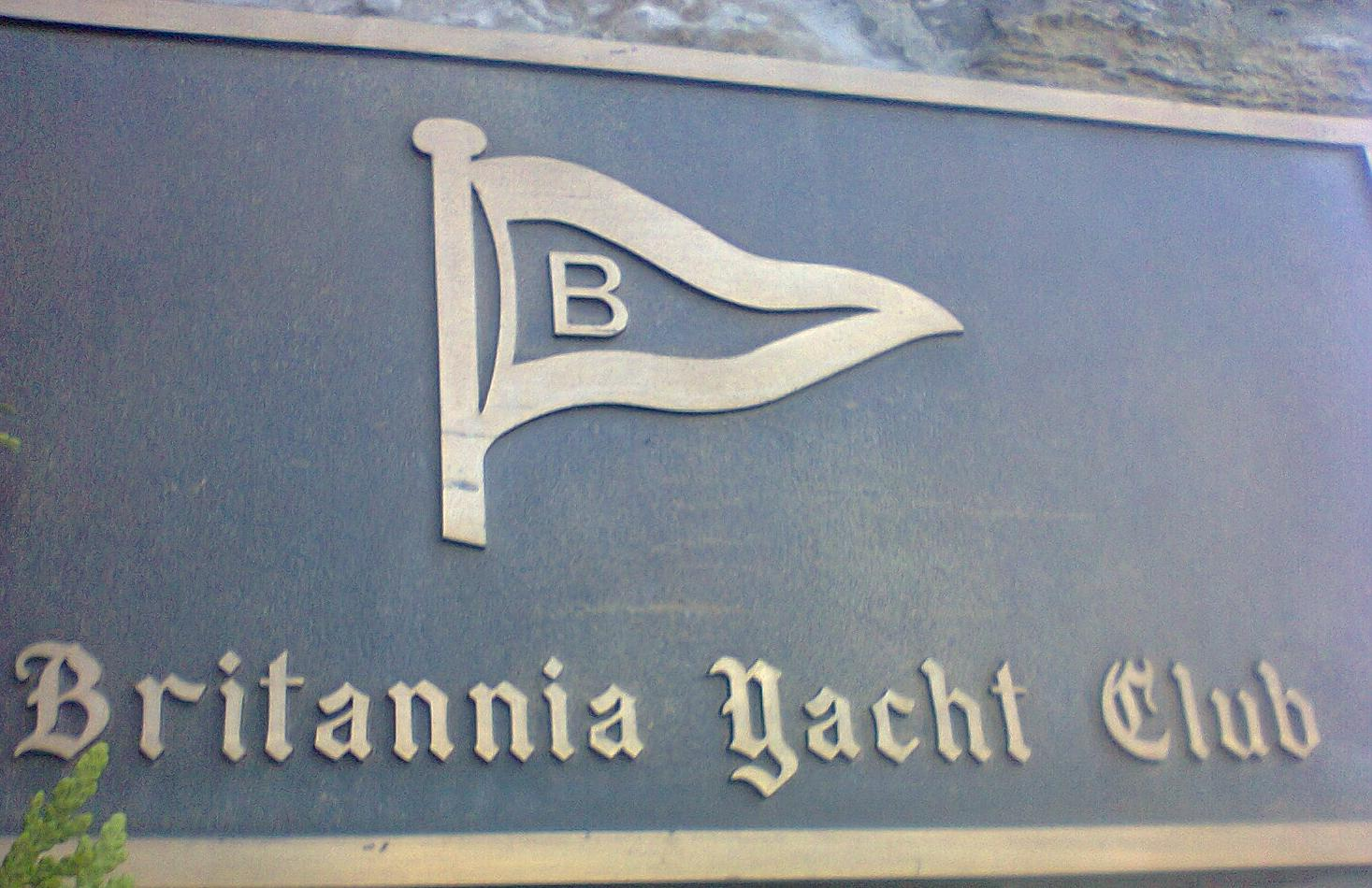
Britannia Yacht Club sign and burgee

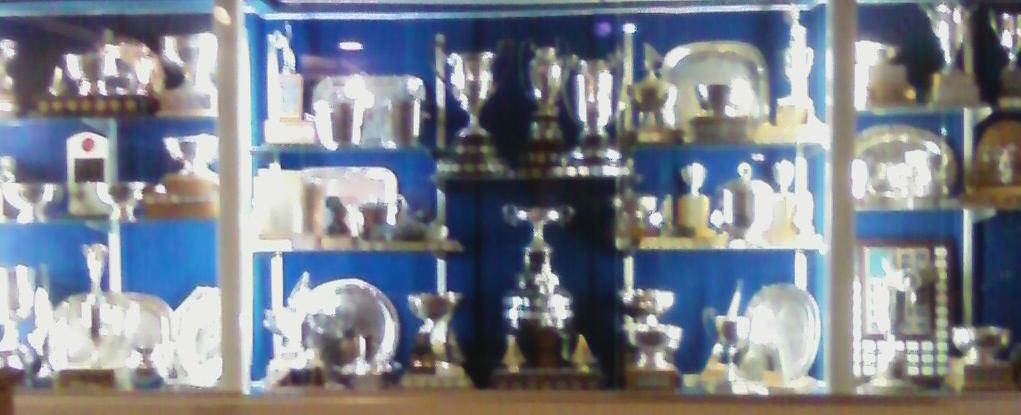
Britannia Yacht Club main lounge trophy cases

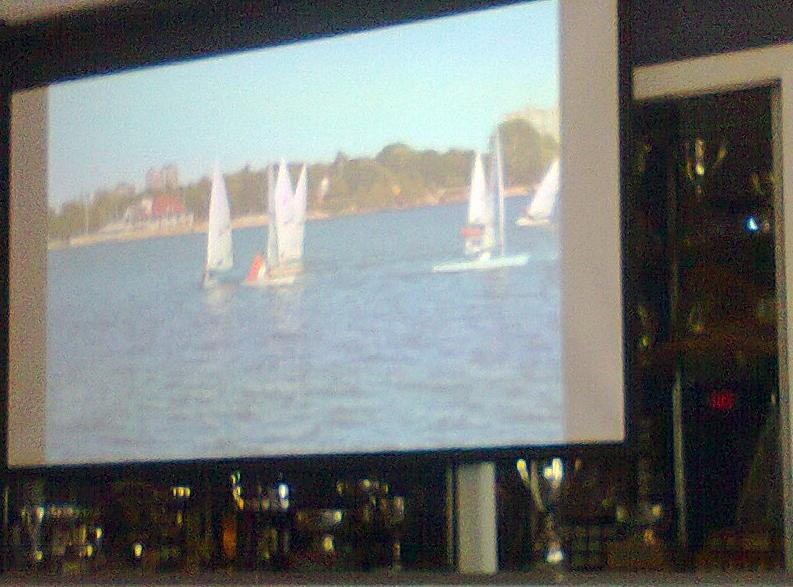
Britannia Yacht Club main lounge screen and trophy case

The clubhouse and gardens feature memorials to members who have contributed to the BYC. For example, the Harbourmaster's Gate (at Britannia Yacht Club) was dedicated 28 October 1989 ``in memory of Vice-Commodore Lorne E Minogue and in recognition of all members who through their voluntary efforts have contributed to the building of this club. ``

Ringing the temptation bell indicates that you have bought a round of drinks for everyone around the dragon bar.

The Nepean Sailing Club donated a trophy case to the Britannia Yacht Club during her centennial celebrations.

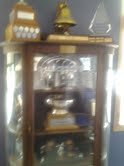
Britannia Yacht Club centennial trophy case donated by Nepean Sailing Club

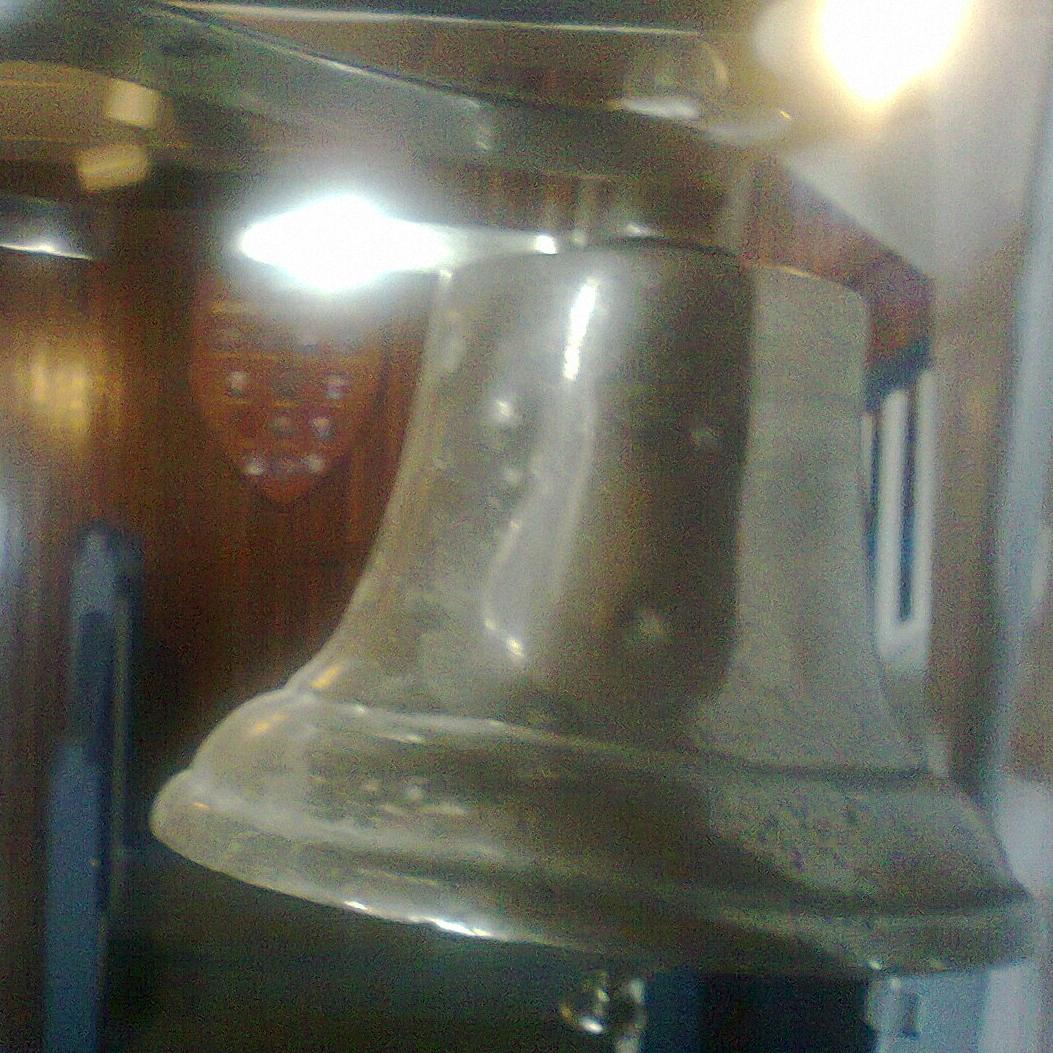
Britannia Yacht Club Temptation Bell

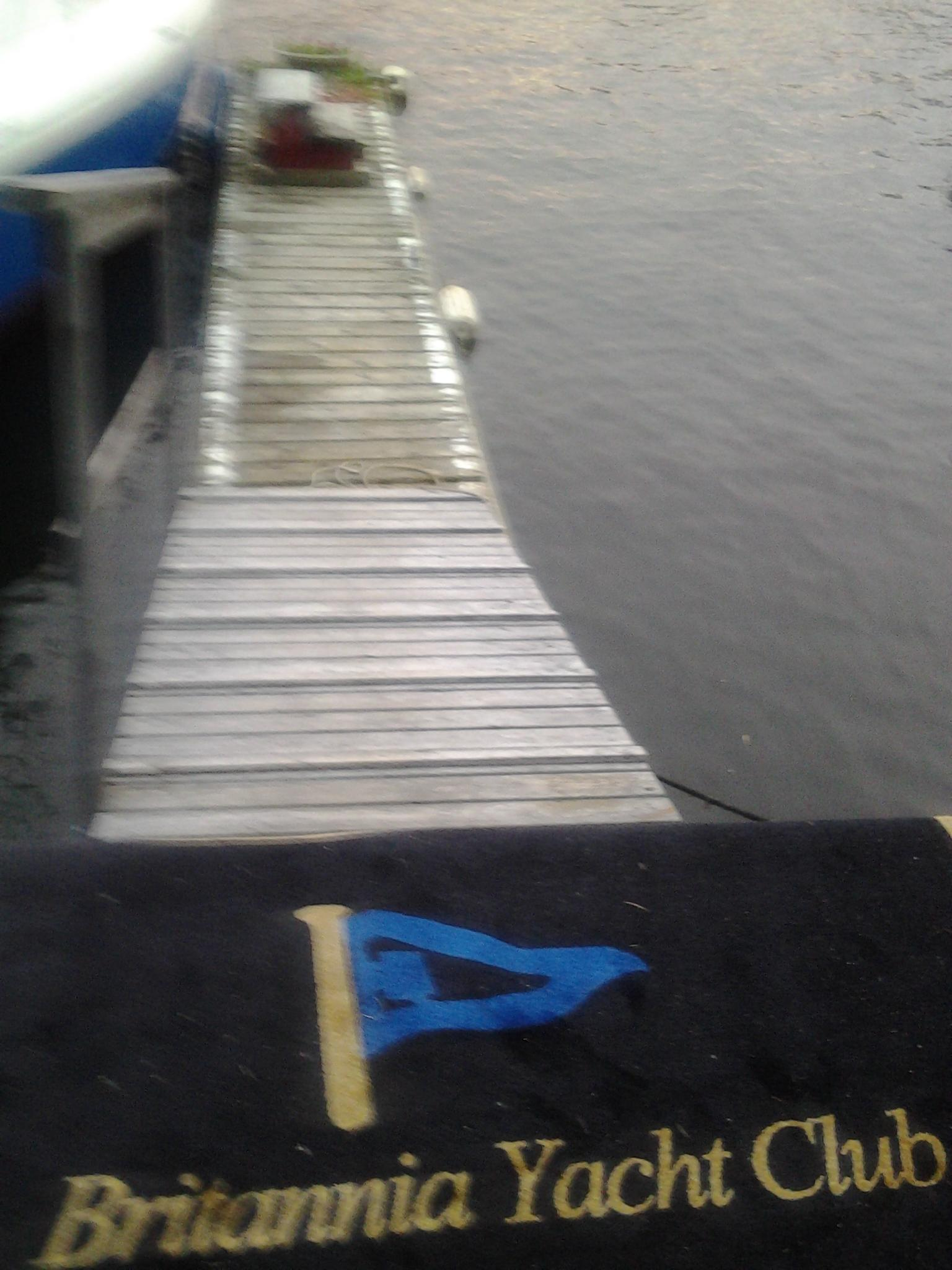
Britannia Yacht Club main harbour floating finger dock with BYC welcome mat

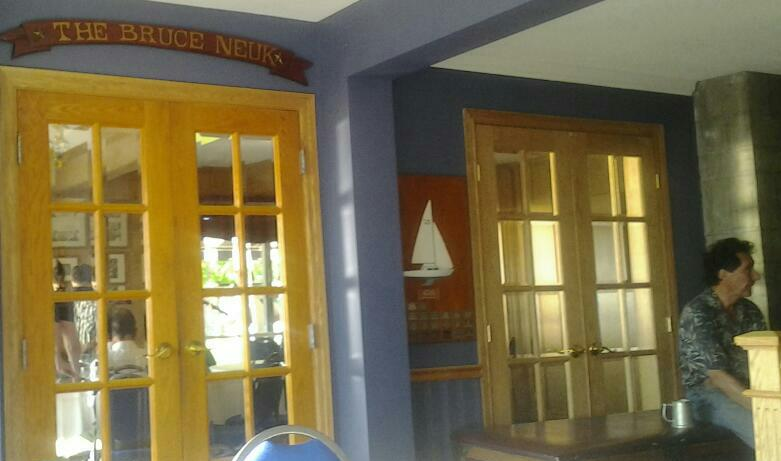
Britannia yacht club The Bruce Neuk's trophies

== Library and archives ==
The Joan Hickman Memorial Library collection consists of books, audio-visual items and periodicals related to sailing. The BYC archives collection includes Regatta programs and posters, Souvenirs, photographs, portraits, Scrapbooks, Diary, letters, newspaper stories, Organization/Event and Sports memorabilia related to the Britannia Yacht Club, and its predecessors Britannia Boating Club and Britannia Nautical Club. The BYC photo archives includes digital and print photographs dating from the 1880s to the present. The Britannia Yacht Club art collection includes Robert Stewart Hyndman's portraits of former Club Commodores, such as the late Reg Bruce and his wife displayed in Bruce Neuk.

== Racing, sailing, canoeing and tennis activities ==
BYC organizes sailboat races in the Ottawa area. Boating consists of a combination of Rowing (sport), Paddling, Sailing, Windsurfing, Fishing, Luxury yachting and a few motorboats involved in Water-skiing, Wakeboarding, in racing, Cruising (maritime), and Day sailing for recreation. There is the occasional Sea-doo, Jet-ski or remote control watercraft.

=== Watercraft (historic and modern) ===
Depending on the event, BYC watercraft include Brigantine • Canoes • Catamarans • Cruisers • Dinghies • Dragon (keelboat) • Fishing boat • Frigate • Jam • Keelboats • Lobster fishing Fishing trawler • raceboards • Sailboats • Sailboard • sailing Sloop • Shark (keelboat) • War Canoes, and/or Yacht. In addition, there are displays of Radio-controlled boats.

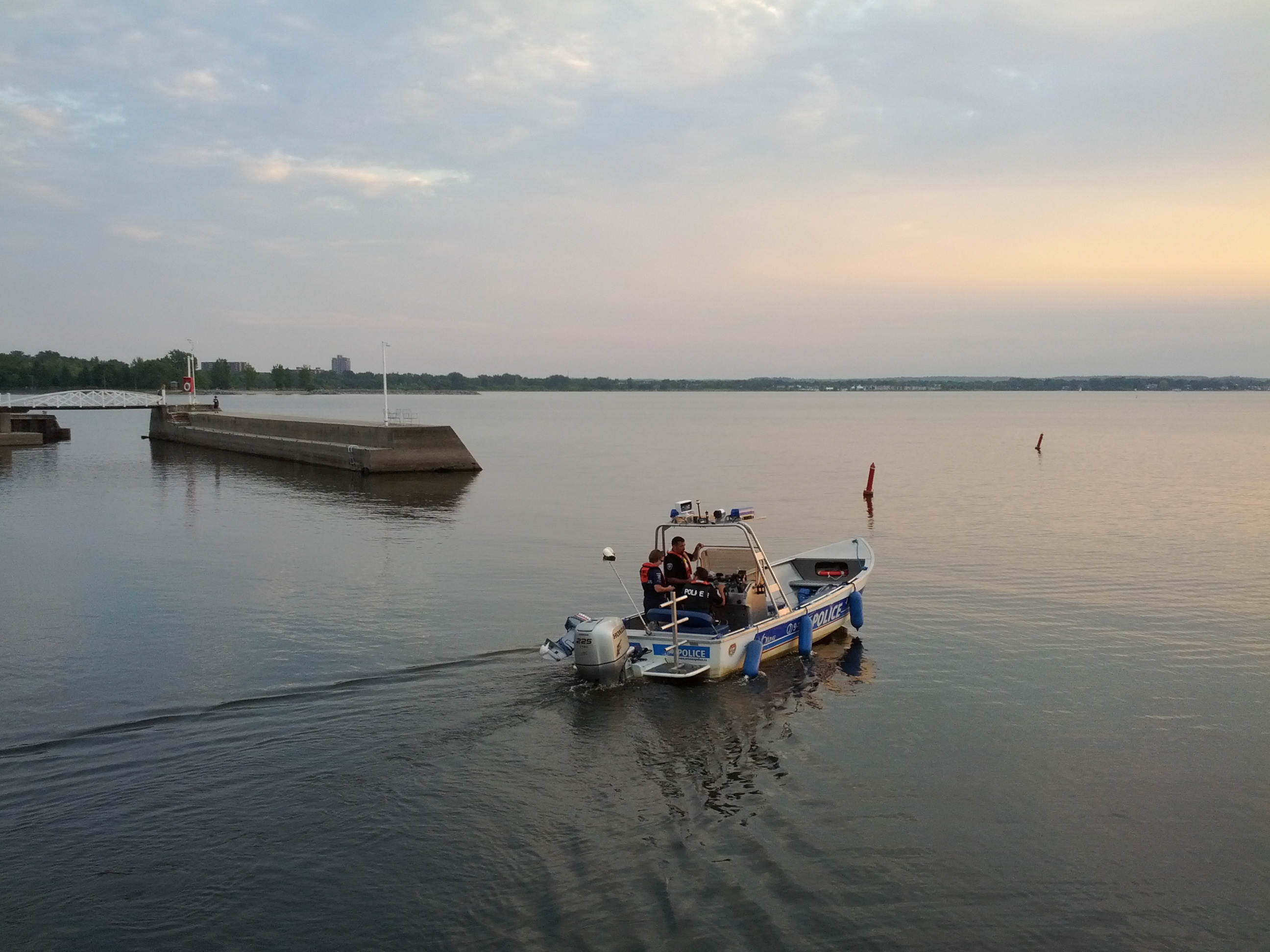
Ottawa Police Service Underwater Search and Recovery Unit at Britannia Yacht Club

Club members own and operate a wide variety of watercraft such as: 420 (dinghy) • Access 2.3 • Albacore (dinghy) • Alberg 35 • Aloha • Bayliner recreational boats • Bluenose 23 (schooner) • Bristol Yachts • Beneteau yachts • Bombardier Recreational Products • Byte CII • C&C Yachts • Cal Yachts • Carver Yachts • Catalina Yachts • Catalina 22 • Catalina 30 • Chris-Craft Commander • Columbia Yachts • Contessa 26 • Contessa 32 • Cygnus (dinghy), Dragon • Ericson Yachts • Etchells • Glastron • Shark • Hobie cat • Kirby 23 • Laser (dinghy) • Mistral One Design Class • Nonsuch (sailboat) • O'Day Mariner • Optimist (dinghy) • Ariel • Ensign • Pearson Triton • Ranger (yacht) • Reinell • Sandpiper 565 • Sea Sprite Sailing Yachts • Sea Ray • Shark • Shark 24 • Soling • Sunfish (sailboat) • Tempest • Thunderbird 26 • and Whaler. In addition, the Ottawa Police Service' Underwater Search and Recovery Unit and Marine Unit serve out of the BYC.

=== Training fleet ===
The International 14 (dinghy)`s K1, introduced to BYC by Doug Carmen in 1943; K1-K6 designs of racing dinghies were involved in racing, training and pleasure until the 1980s.

The Lightning (keelboat) was introduced to BYC by Victor Pinard in the 1950s.

The Y flyer, introduced to BYC by Harvey Fenton was used as a racing, training and pleasure sloop rigged racing dinghy from 1955 to 1970.

The Wayfarer (dinghy) was introduced to BYC by Douglas Arrol from 1963-present. In 1963, a single Wayfarer sailed in a mixed BYC Day Sailer (dinghy) fleet of 15 including an Enterprise (dinghy), two Snipe (dinghy), a Grew Dinghy, an Albacore (dinghy), a Jolly boat, a Firefly, and an H.R. 20. In 1964, a tradition developed of naming B.Y.C.'s Wayfarers starting with "W's", for example, Watusi (W.826); Whisky, Windigo, Windlass, Wihuri and Wirrinda (W.827); BYC Wayfarers competed in the St. Lawrence Valley Y.R.A. Regatta and the Canadian Wayfarer Championships. W 1257 Peter Jefferson of BYC won the Wayfarer racing North American Championship in 1964.

The Shark (keelboat), introduced by past BYC commodore Livius Sherwood, was used as a racing, training & pleasure sailboat from the 1970 to the present.

Designed in 1969 by former BYC member, Bruce Kirby (yachts), the Laser (sailboat) has been used at the Olympic Games from 1996 to the present.

=== Races ===
Competitive sailing takes place in or with many different types of boats including dinghies, windsurfers, multihulls, yachts, kitesurfing and radio controlled sailing boats. There are then the further disciplines of fleet racing, match racing and team racing. A PHRF boat races with a Flying Sails (FS) PHRF-LO rating and a JAM boat is racing with a Non-Flying Sails (NFS) PHRF-LO rating.

BYC has several one-design racing fleets associated with it. Its members are active competitors in 420, International 505, International Class, J/24, Laser, Optimist, Star, Sunfish, Thunderbird, and PHRF class events, many of which it hosts. A Performance Handicap Racing Fleet (PHRF) fleet races in club-sponsored events. The club organizes weeknight racing from April through September and holds several weekend regattas each year. The club also has an active cruising program.

The sailing season extends from mid April to late October. Sail training programs are active during the summer months for both youth and adults.

Every year the club hosts regattas that attract sailors from across Canada and internationally. The local racing scene consists of fleet, PY and PHRF races on an almost daily basis along with special racing events on weekends throughout the season. Many racing events are held in cooperation with the nearby Nepean Sailing Club and Club de Voile Grande-Rivière. The BYC & NSC have a schedule of cruising and day sailing events organized by the membership for fun, as memorials for members who serve in the Canadian Forces, and as fundraisers for local charities.

=== Tennis ===
The BYC tennis program includes the BYC 125th anniversary Junior Tennis Tournament on June 9, 2012, which is a part of the National Capital Tennis Association's initiative to promote tennis for junior players 14 and under. Group lessons are free for BYC Members. Beginner lessons are held on Wednesdays from 6:30 to 7:30 pm.

== Partnerships ==
While the Britannia Yacht Club installed and maintains the lights and buoys on the Britannia Yacht Club and Baskins Beach Ranges; Parks Canada, Ontario Ministry of Transport, municipalities, clubs and private sailors have installed and maintain a number of other lights, Buoys and Fog signals on the Ottawa River. Port-hand buoys are green, and starboard-hand buoys are red.

In addition to BYC, other yacht clubs on both the Ontario and Quebec sides of Lac Deschênes include Nepean Sailing Club, Lac Deschênes Sailing Club, Kanata Sailing Club, and the Club de Voile Grande Riviere.

The BYC has reciprocal agreements with other yacht clubs. The BYC is developing a joint marketing campaign with the Nepean Sailing Club to increase awareness of recreational and competitive sailing in Ottawa. The BYC has partnered with the Britannia Village Community to deliver fireworks presentations on Victoria Day and Canada Day.

Ottawa Power and Sail Squadron (OPSS) is a member of the Canadian Power and Sail Squadrons's Britannia-Rideau District which provides Boating Education to the National Capital Region & the Upper Rideau Waterway. On June 27, 2012, BYC is hosting the OPSS graduation ceremonies in the BYC's Sunset Room.

The BYC is active within the Canadian Yachting Association and the Ontario Sailing Association's Eastern Ontario Region.

As a Development Training Centre for 2012, BYC supports the training of athletes from the grassroots to the national team level and supports the development of coaches from Level 1 (CANSail 1&2) to Level 4-5.

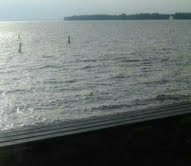
Britannia Yacht Club range Buoys

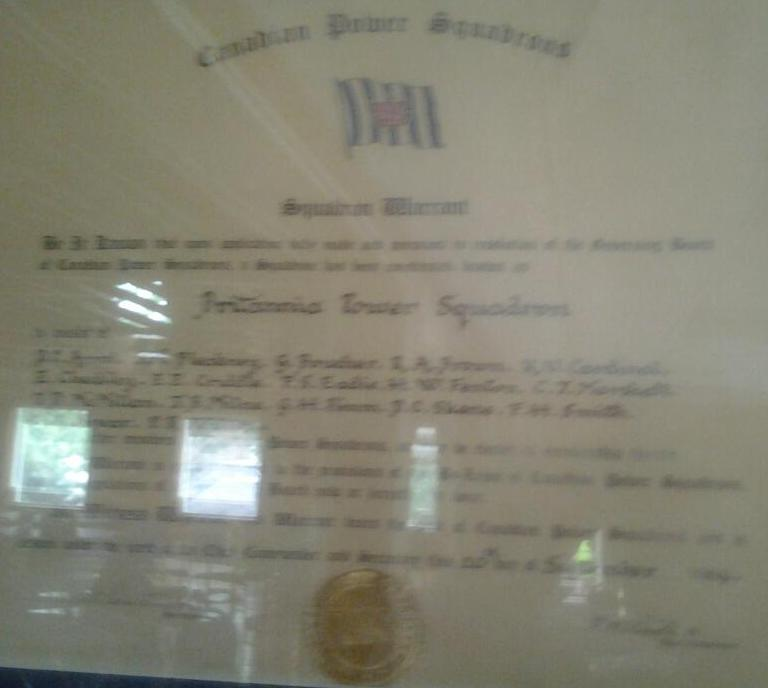
Britannia Yacht Club Canadian Power Squadron Warrant for Britannia Power Squadron

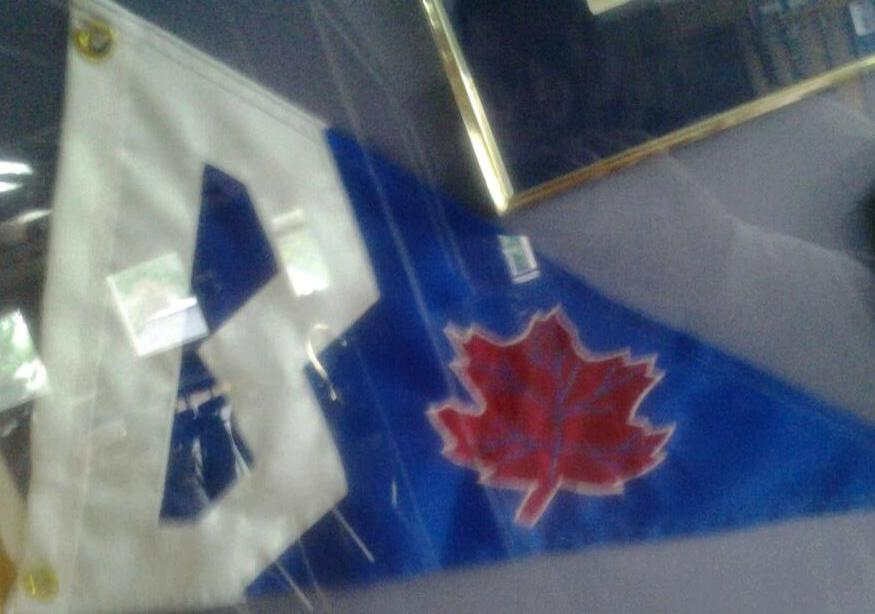
Britannia Yacht Club Britannia Power & Sail Squadron burgee

== Organization ==
The BYC is a provincially incorporated Not for profit corporation with key documents such as Letters patent, By-laws, Regulations, policy and procedures manuals. The BYC is organized like any other club or organization with committees, chairperson, directors, etc. Due to the connection with the sea and hence the Royal Canadian Navy, the various posts use naval terminology for the Flag Officers. For example, the chairperson/Chief Executive Officer is the Commodore while the former chairman/CEO is the Past Commodore. Under the Commodore there are also the Vice Commodore (Projects - in charge of land-based activities), the Rear Commodore (Harbourmaster - in charge of water-based activities) and a Fleet Captain. The board of directions includes the Directors in charge of House (House and Grounds), Tennis, Membership & Marketing, Information Technology and Communications, Youth, Social, Public Relations and an Immediate Past Commodore.

The Sailing committee consists of Fleet Captain, Monday Night Rep, Alpha Course PHRF Rep, Bravo Course PHRF Rep, Wednesday Night Rep, One-Design Rep, JAM Rep, Equipment Manager, Youth Sailing, Up-River Race Rep, PHRF-LO Co-Handicapper, Scorer, Protest Chair & PHRF-LO Co-Handicapper, Trophy Keeper & Sailing Instructions and Recording Secretary. The Sailing sub-committees include: National Capital Regatta, Hinterhieller Regatta, Stan Carson Memorial C&C Regatta, and Britannia High Performance.

There is a BYC historian, counsel, honorary treasurer and honorary secretary. The staff positions include a Manager, Accountant and Harbour Manager. As the Chief Operating Officer of the club, the Club Manager is responsible to the Board of Directors and under the supervision and authority of the Commodore. The Club Manager is responsible for the general and daily operation of the BYC within the policies and procedures established by the Board of Directors and through the By-law and Regulations the club. The Club Manager is responsible for the implementation of Club policy, and for the management of the yacht club operation. The Club Manager, together with the Commodore, represents the BYC internally and externally in community activities.

The Britannia Yacht Club Foundation was created at the 2010 Annual general Meeting of the Britannia Yacht Club.

The Commodore's boardroom table features a Ship's wheel from the G.B. Patee II. The boardroom houses an extensive library of nautical books, known as the Joan Hickman Memorial Library.

The official newsletter of the BYC is the Full and By, which means to sail as close to the wind as possible with every sail full.

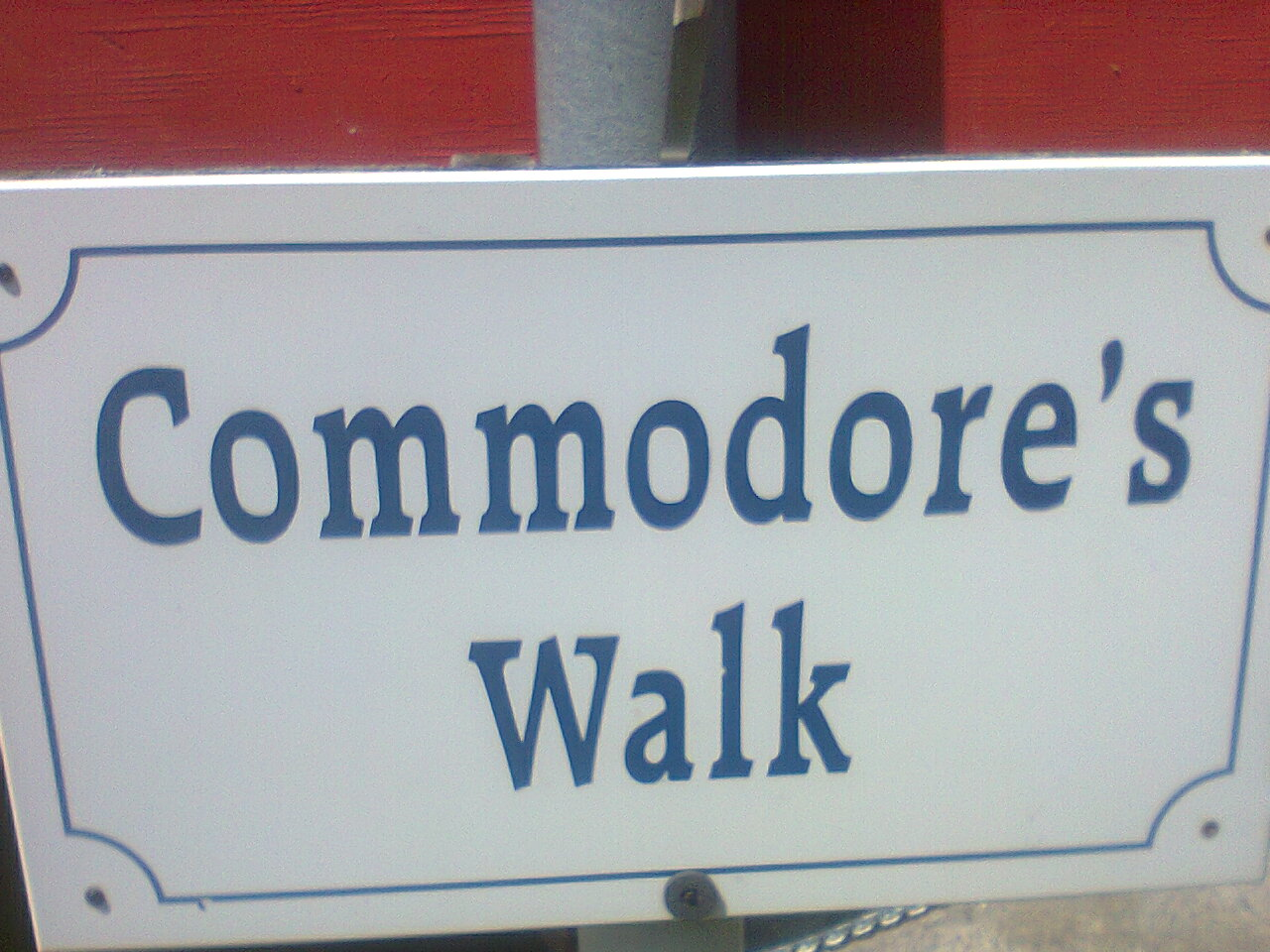
Britannia Yacht Club Commodore's Walk

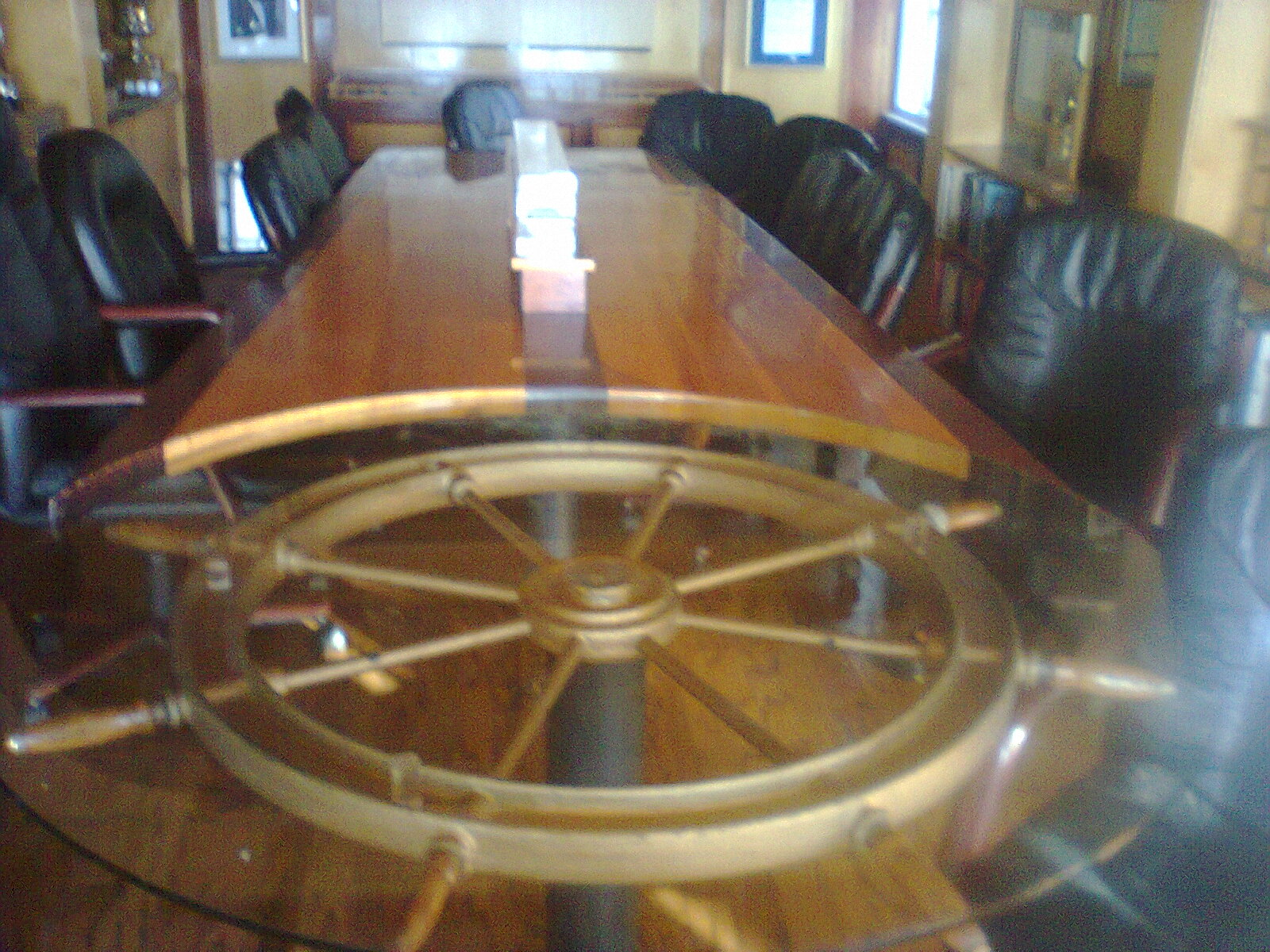
Britannia Yacht Club Commodore Boardroom

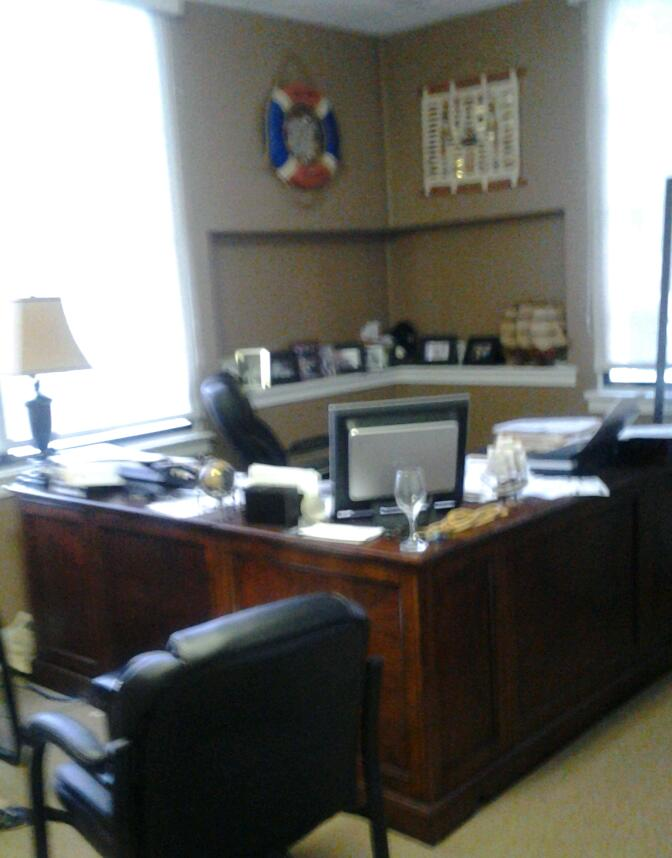
Britannia Yacht Club manager's office

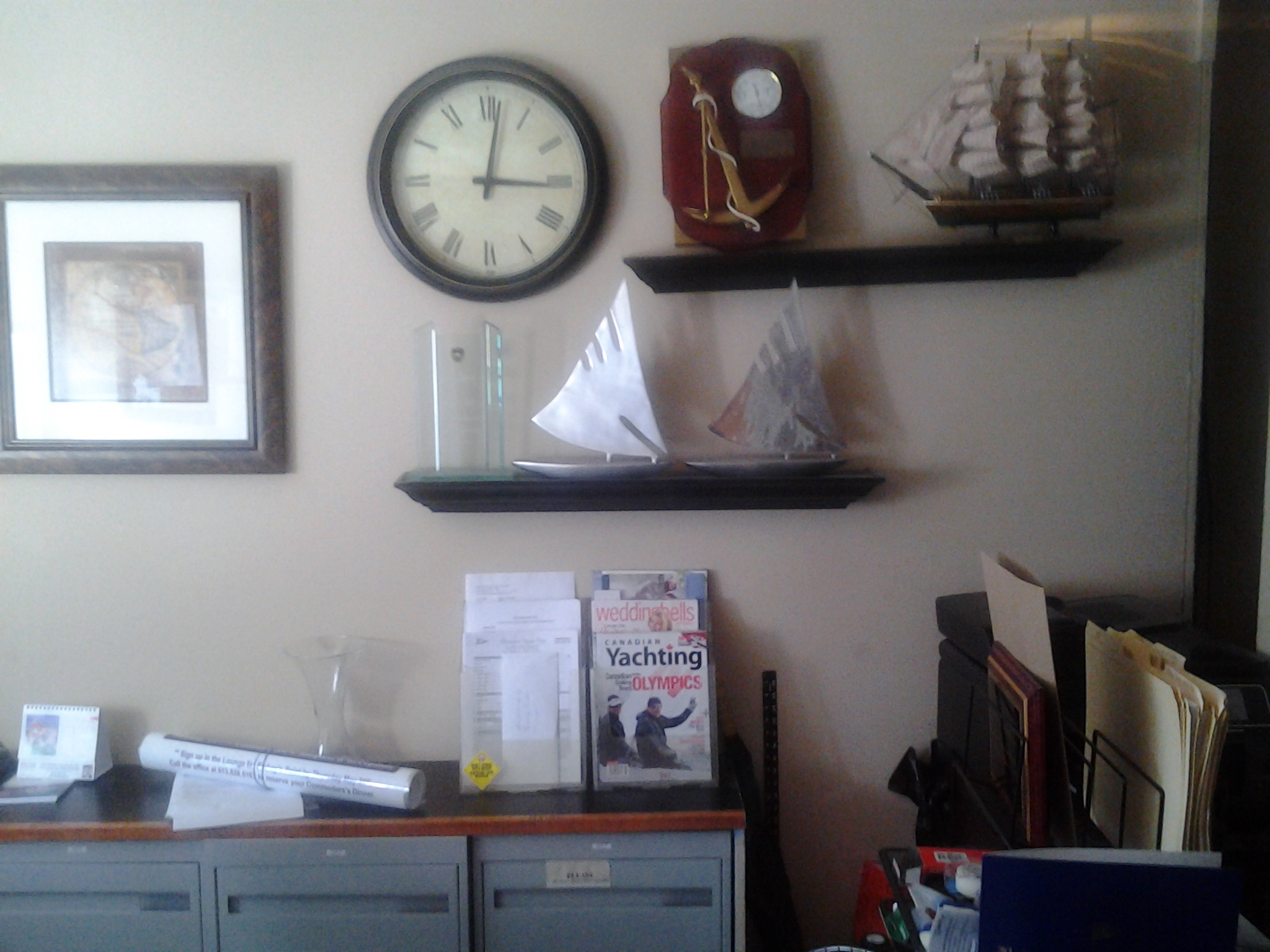
Britannia Yacht Club office, Britannia, Ottawa

== Notable members ==
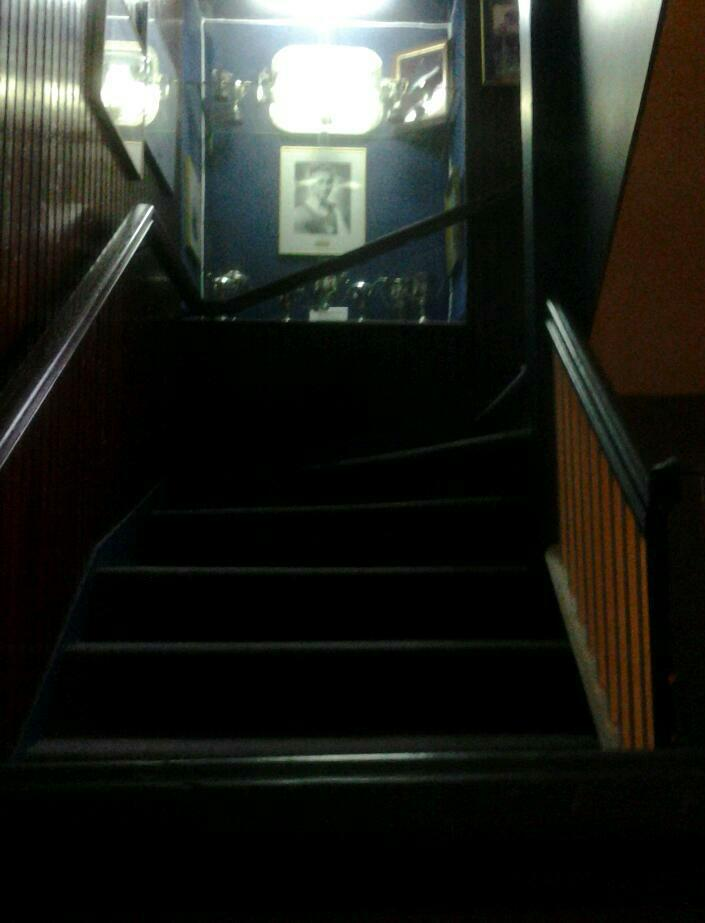
Britannia Yacht Club display cabinet in stairwell features Frank Amyot's photo and trophies

- Frank Amyot, Canada's only gold medal winner from the 1936 Summer Olympics, paddled these waters in the 1920s and 1930s as a member of the Britannia Boating Club.
- Josle Braden, the first female Commodore at BYC, served from 1992–1993.
- Ian Bruce of BYC competed in Sailing at the 1960 Summer Olympics, Finn (dinghy) class,
- Thomas G. Fuller (1908 - 1994). War hero (Pirate of the Adriatic); Founder, Thomas Fuller Construction
- Bruce Kirby (yachts), sailor and designer
- Halder Kirby, hockey player, son of charter member Thomas H Kirby
- J.E. Stanley Lewis, a member of the Britannia Boating Club war canoe team in 1915, when it won the Dominion championship; later mayor of Ottawa, 1936–1948
- Don McDiarmid - Canada's number one singles player 1930s
- Harvey Pulford achieved national success as a paddler with the Britannia Boating Club 1905-11
- Hon. Justice Livius Anglin Sherwood (1923–2002), BYC Commodore (1964–65), Founder of BYC's junior sailing program, magistrate (1960) provincial judge (1968–83), federal court judge (1988–93), sailor, international sailing judge of 3 Olympic regattas, 7 America's Cups and 26 world championships of the International Sailing Federation (ISAF). Sherwood Port, which is the entry to BYC harbour and the Livius Sherwood Detention and Custody Centre were named in his honour.
- Roderick Percy Sparks BBC Commodore 1910–13, environmentalist, known as 'father of' Gatineau Park
- Ezekiel Stone Wiggins BBBC Commodore 1899, teacher, amateur meteorologist and his wife, writer Susie Anna Wiggins built 'Arbour House', a Designated Heritage Property 1994, as their Queen Anne Revival-style summer home in Britanna

== Commodores ==
=== Britannia Yacht Club ===
Phil Moorman 2012-2011 • Konrad Lewinski 2011-2012 • George Clayburn 2008-9 • John Irvin 2006-7 • Lynn DeL'orme 2004 • John Vines 2002 • Paul Dalahay 2000-1 • Kirk Robertson 1998-9 • Rosemary MacKillop 1996-97 • Simon Fuller 1995 • Josle Braden 1993 • Larry Bradley 1991 • Dennis Foy 1989 • Ian Anderson 1987 • Commodore Denny 1986 • David Brown 1983 • William Wright 1982 • Philip Brule 1980 • A.R. Vanderbelt 1978 • Blair Cooke 1976 • Walter Blandy 1974 • Osie Blouin 1971 • John Killick 1970 • Thomas E. Appleton 1966-67 • Livius A. Sherwood 1964-65 • James A.S. Milne 1962-63 • Lorne Smith 1961 • Gordon Foy 1959-60 • Grover Book 1957-8 • Earl Checkley 1956 • Reg A.S. Bruce 1954-55 • A.N. Hudleson 1953 • Earl Checkley 1951-2 • Cameron Jones 1950 •

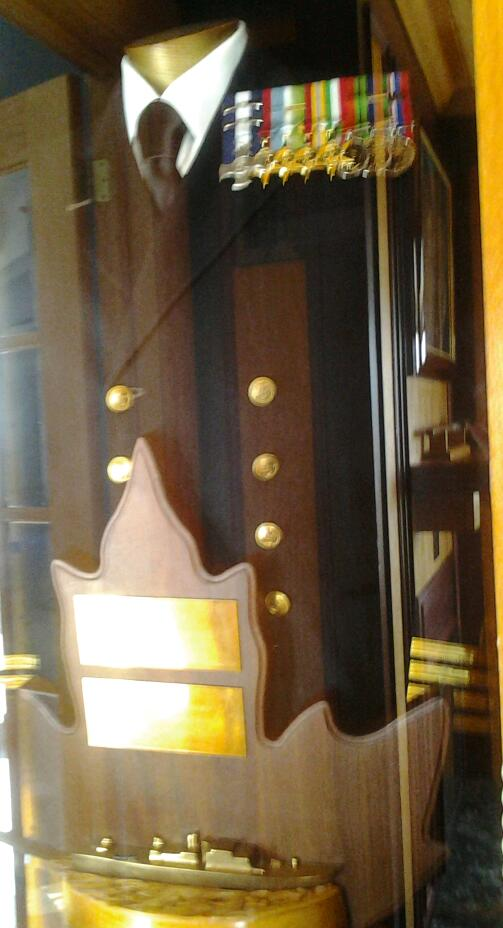
Britannia Yacht Club display cabinet in Commodore's boardroom features Thomas G. Fuller's uniform, sword and a memorial trophy awarded annually to the Canadian Forces Naval Reserve achieving the topmost state of combat readiness

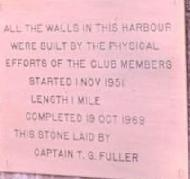
Brass plaque Building Harbour, Britannia Yacht Club 1 November 1951 – 19 October 1969 stone laid by Captain Thomas G. Fuller, former Commodore at BYC

=== Britannia Boating Club ===
Thomas G. Fuller 1948-49 • Allan Jacques 1947 • Don Kirby 1946 • Reg A.S. Bruce (in whose honour Bruce Neuk was named) 1945 • L.P.R. Cook 1938-44 • F.A. Skuce 1935-37 • D.L. Fenton 1933-34 • David P Kirby 1930-32 • A.J. Fraser 1928-9 • T.D. Higginson 1928 • T.A. Burgess 1927 • T.S. Kirby 1920-26 • T.A. Burgess 1918-19 • Guy Boyce 1916-17 • E.R. McNeil 1914-15 • Roderick Percy Sparks 1910-13 • E.L. Donnelly 1906-9 • William Rowatt 1905 •

=== Britannia Bay Boathouse Club ===
E.L. Brittain 1904 • William Wyld 1902-3 • Arthur Tache 1901 • William Percival 1900 • Ezekiel Stone Wiggins 1899 • William Wyld 1896-8 •

=== Britannia Nautilus Club ===
E.D. Parlow 1894 • Geo Howe 1892-3 •

== Awards and recognition ==
BYC has been a leader in teaching sailing over the years.

The Britannia–Rideau Power & Sail Squadron remains committed to safer boating through education. Run by member volunteers, the Squadron handles the administration, organizes social functions, teaches and proctors courses in Boating and Navigation. From 1964–2011, the Britannia Power & Sail Squadron (BPSS), was one of 3 squadrons in the National Capital Region affiliated with the Canadian Power & Sail Squadron. In 2011, the BPSS was renamed the Britannia–Rideau Power & Sail Squadron (BRPSS)to reflect having absorbed the area served by the former Rideau Lakes Power & Sail Squadron (RLPSS).

In 2004, BYC was awarded the William Abbott Senior Trophy - Sail Training Program of the Year at the Canadian Yachting Association annual awards.

BYC has been a leader in the development of competitive sailors. In 2008, the Ontario Sailing Board of Directors selected BYC as one of ten Development Training Centers where members of the Ontario Sailing Team (OST), Ontario Sailing Development Team (OSDT) and Quest for Gold Elite Team sailors train.

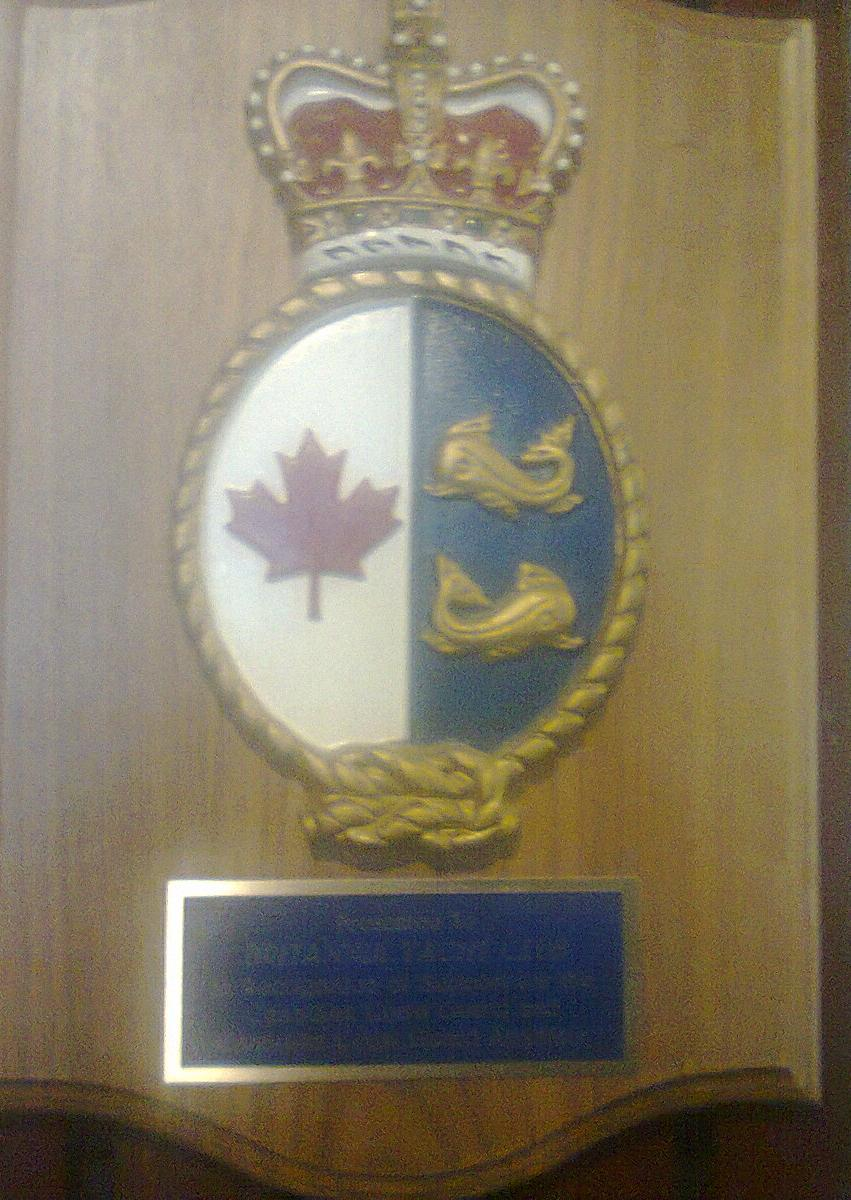
Presented to Britannia Yacht Club in recognition of support for the Canadian Coast Guard and Canadian Coast Guard Auxiliary

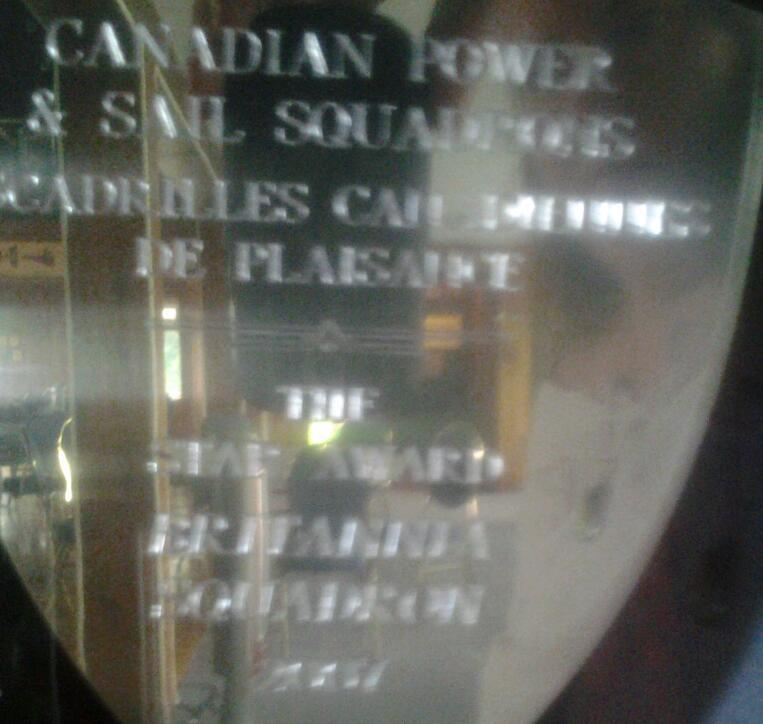
Presented to Britannia Yacht Club in recognition of support for the Canadian Power & Sail Squadron
