= Ottawa River Canoe Club =

Ottawa River Canoe Club (ORCC) is a non-profit paddling organization in operation since 2002 and located in the west-end of Ottawa, Ontario, Canada. The organization offers a variety of recreational and competitive paddling programs for everyone, including:

- summer camps for kids 5 to 14
- stand-up paddleboarding (SUP)
- canoe and kayak introductory courses
- competitive sprint canoe/kayak racing
- "Paddle All" and para paddling - for our disabled athletes
- adventure racing instruction
- outrigger
- dragon boat

The club is a member of the Eastern Ontario Division (EOD) of Canoe Kayak Canada (Canoe Kayak Eastern Ontario Division). The sport of flat water sprint racing is represented by the Ontario Canoe Sprint Racing Affiliation (OCSRA) of Canoe Ontario.
