= Mic Mac AAC =

- Type: Organizations based in Canada
- Legal status: active
- Purpose: advocate and public voice, educator and network
- Headquarters: Lake Banook in Dartmouth, Nova Scotia, Canada
- Region served: Lake Banook in Dartmouth, Nova Scotia, Canada
- Official language: English, French
- Parent organization: Canoe Kayak Canada. Rowing Canada
- Website: http://www.micmacaac.com/

Mic Mac Amateur Aquatic Club (MMAAC) is located on Lake Banook in Dartmouth, Nova Scotia, Canada. It provides structured recreational and competitive boating, and swimming programs to the local community, and summer day camp programs for children ages 6-12.

The club is part of Canoe Kayak Canada and Rowing Canada.
