= Frank Amyot =

Canadian Olympic sprint canoeist

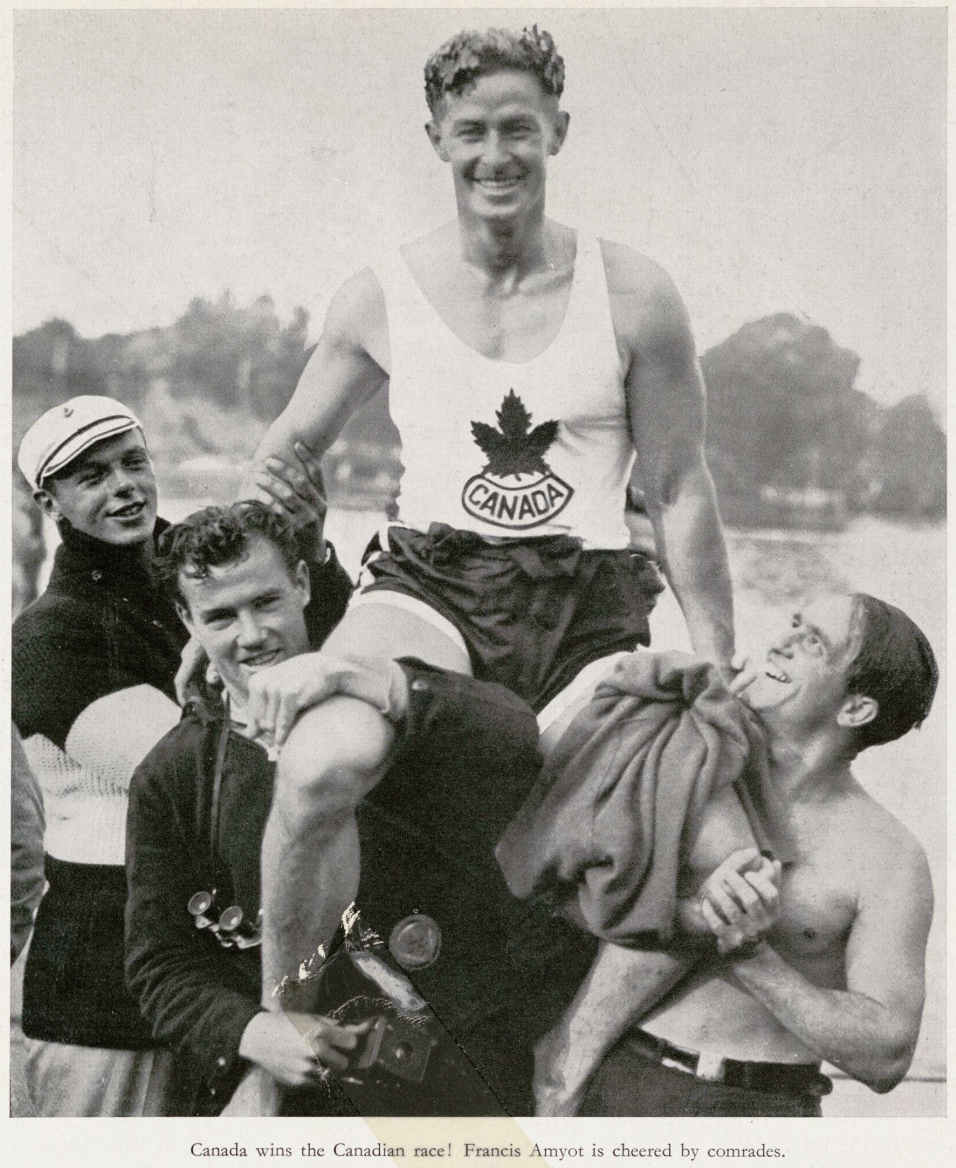
- Amyot after winning Canadian Canoe race at 1936 Olympics

Personal information
- Born: Francis Amyot; September 14, 1904 Thornhill, Ontario, Canada
- Died: November 21, 1962 (aged 58) Ottawa, Ontario
- Height: 6 ft 2 in (188 cm)
- Weight: 185 lb (84 kg)

Sport
- Country: Canada
- Sport: Canoe racing
- Club: Britannia Yacht Club

Achievements and titles
- Olympic finals: 1938
Medal record
Men's canoe sprint
Representing Canada
Olympic Games
Gold medal – first place	1936 Berlin	C-1 1000 m

Francis Amyot (September 14, 1904 – November 21, 1962) was a Canadian sprint canoeist who competed in the 1930s. He won Canada's only gold medal at the 1936 Summer Olympics.

== Biography ==
Amyot was born in Thornhill, Ontario. On June 18, 1933 he saved Ottawa Rough Riders Dave Sprague and Eddie Bond from drowning, when their canoe overturned on Lake Deschenes.

Amyot won Canada's only gold medal at the 1936 Summer Olympics in the C-1 1000m canoeing event. This proved embarrassing to Canadian officials who had refused to pay his way. In 1936, Britannia Boating Club raised money for Frank Amyot's Olympic Fund campaign. When he won the 1000 meter championship in the 1936 Olympic Games, Frank Amyot of BYC raced the Canadian canoe, which is different from the type of canoe he had raced in Canadian Canoe Association meets. Although he had seen blueprints, Amyot paddled the Canadian canoe for the first time during the final training stages in Germany. On July 18, 1942, Lieutenant Frank Amyot attended a meeting of 17 Britannia Boating Club members, in army and civilian war jobs during World War II, at Holborn Restaurant in London, England.

When his body was examined by medical personnel during an autopsy, they found cancer all over his body, which they believe is the cause of his death.

== Legacy ==
Amyot was inducted into the Canadian Olympic Hall of Fame in 1949 and Canada's Sports Hall of Fame in 1955.

In 1964, the Britannia Yacht Club presented the Frank Amyot Memorial Trophy awarded to Junior Men C-15 Canoe Kayak Canada Canadian Sprint Canoe Kayak Championships, in loving memory of Frank Amyot, a life member of the club, Olympic Single Blade Singles C-1 Gold Medallist (1936), and distinguished member of Canada's Sports Hall of Fame.

In 2012, the Britannia Yacht Club stairwell featured a display with a photo of Frank Amyot and a collection of his trophies.

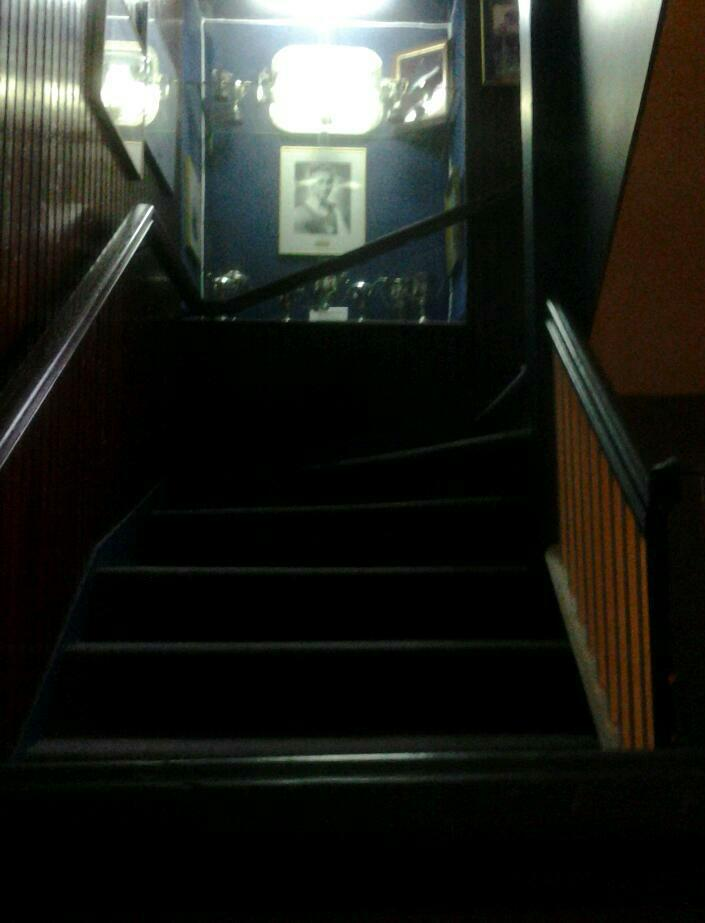
Britannia Yacht Club stairwell features photo of Frank Amyot and trophies
