= Canoe Kayak Canada =

Governing body of competitive canoeing and kayaking disciplines in Canada

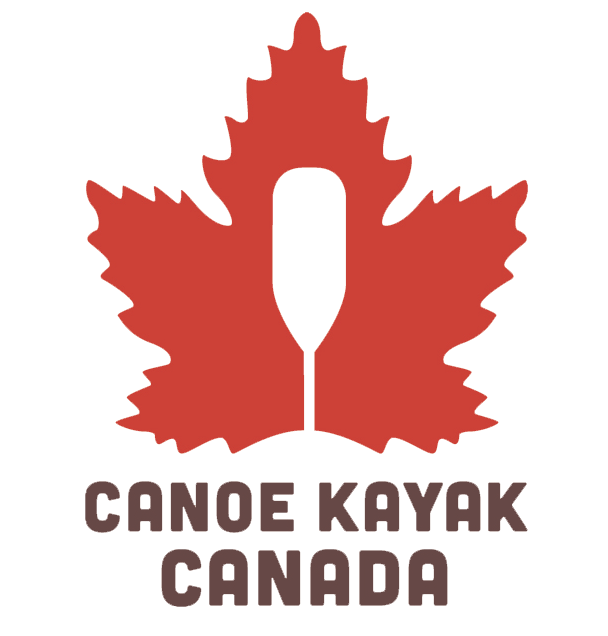
- Formation: 1900
- Type: Organizations based in Canada
- Legal status: active
- Headquarters: Ottawa, Ontario, Canada
- Region served: Canada
- Official language: English, French
- Website: canoekayak.ca

Canoe Kayak Canada (French: Canot Kayak Canada) is the governing body of competitive canoeing and kayaking disciplines in Canada. The three specific disciplines represented are flatwater, whitewater and marathon. Canoe Kayak Canada officially replaced the name "Canadian Canoe Association" in 2005, although the former title is still used by the organization. The name change came about from a desire to include the kayaking discipline in the organization's name.

CKC head offices are located in Ottawa, Ontario although divisional and provincial offices as well as high performance centres are maintained throughout the country.

== History ==
The Canadian Canoe Association was founded in 1900 in Brockville, Ontario. There were nine initial charter clubs: Carleton Place Canoe Club (Carleton Place), Brockville Rowing Club (Brockville), Brockville Y.M.C.A. (Brockville), Bohemian Amateur Athletic Association (Brockville), Lachine Boat & Canoe Club (Montreal), Grand Trunk Boating Club (Montreal), Britannia Boat House Club (Ottawa), Ottawa Canoe Club (Ottawa), Kingston Yacht Club (Kingston). Carleton Place Canoe Club is the only surviving charter member within the organization although the Lachine club has survived through revival. Brockville Rowing, Ottawa, Britannia Yacht Club and Kingston still operate but outside the organization.

The Association was founded in an effort to coordinate Canadian canoe clubs into a national competition separate from that of the American Canoe Association (to which these clubs belonged until 1900). The national championship was initiated in 1900 although no club champion was designated until 1904, the Ottawa Canoe Club becoming the first official Canadian Champion at that time.

National Championships were cancelled during the years 1916-1918 and 1942-1945 due to the two world wars and also in 2020 due to the COVID-19 Coronavirus Global Pandemic. While the national championship continues to this day and is considered the premier national regatta, provincial divisions and regions have organized a variety of events to fill out the seasonal schedule of events for competitors. Canoe Kayak Canada also runs annual selection trials to determine their national team squad - athletes chosen to compete in international events including Pan American Games, Junior and Senior World Championships, and the Olympic Games.

=== Today ===
Canoe Kayak Canada now boasts the largest membership it has ever had. Club membership has risen to over 60 member clubs across the country and individual membership continues to grow. The organization has initiated three recent programs to assist with domestic development: Canoe Kids, a program aimed at introducing more young people to the sport of canoe-kayak; the Aboriginal Paddling Initiative, a program aimed at incorporating more ancient clubs into the organization's membership; Paddle-All, a program designed to include all athletes of varying disabilities.

== Disciplines ==
=== Flatwater ===
Club Members

| Atlantic | Quebec | Eastern Ontario | Western Ontario | Prairie | Pacific |
|---|---|---|---|---|---|
| Abegweit | Cartierville | Carleton Place | Aka:we | Calgary | Burnaby |
| Abenaki | Cascades | Gananoque | Ak-O-Mak | Greater Edmonton | Chinook |
| Banook | Deux Rives | North Bay | Balmy Beach | Leduc | Creekside |
| Cheema | Lac Beauport | Ottawa River | Burloak Canoe Club | St. Albert | False Creek |
| Kennebecasis | Lac Sergent | Rideau Canoe Club | Collingwood | Saskatoon | Fort |
| Kinap | Lachine | Sydenham Lake | Lakehead | Selkirk | Kamloops |
| Maskwa | Onake | Petrie Island | London | Toba | Nanaimo |
| Mic Mac AAC | Otterburn | Cobourg | Mississauga | Wascana | Nelson |
| Milo | Pointe Claire | Peterborough | Pickering Rouge | Yorkton | Pemberton |
| Orenda | Shawinigan | | Richmond Hill | Flatwater North | Pitt Meadows |
| Pisiquid | Sherbrooke | | South Niagara | | Ridge |
| Sack-A-Wa | Trois Rivières | | Sudbury | | Victoria Youth |
| Senobe | Viking | | Toronto Island | | |

Champions

The following clubs have won the Canadian Canoe Championships:

| Wins | Club |
|---|---|
| 19 | **Mississauga** |
| 10 | **Burloak**, **Cartierville**, **Lachine**, **Rideau** |
| 9 | Toronto (Sailing) |
| 7 | **Cheema** |
| 6 | Grand Trunk |
| 5 | **Balmy Beach**, Island |
| 3 | **Orenda**, **Gananoque** |
| 2 | **Maskwa**, **Banook**, Quebec, Radisson, Humber Bay, Ottawa (New Edinburgh) |
| 1 | **Lac Beauport**, Winnipeg, Parkdale, Parkdale-Swansea |

Bold indicates a currently active club within the CKC.

Athletes

Canoe Kayak Canada is responsible for athlete selection for international canoeing events including the Olympic Games. Notable athletes produced by Canoe Kayak Canada and its precursor, the Canadian Canoe Association, include the following Olympic medallists:

- Adam van Koeverden (Oakville, ON) - Olympics 2004 - Gold and Bronze medallist; 2008 - Silver medallist; 2012 - Silver medallist
- Caroline Brunet (Lac Beauport, QC) - Olympics 1996, 2000 - Silver medallist; 2004 - Bronze medallist
- Larry Cain (Oakville, ON) - Olympics 1984 - Gold and Silver medallist
- Laurence Vincent-Lapointe (Trois Rivières, QC) - Olympics 2021 - Silver and Bronze medallist
- Alwyn Morris (Kahnawake, QC) - Olympics 1984 - Gold and Bronze medallist
- Hugh Fisher (Burnaby, BC) - Olympics 1984: Gold and Bronze medallist
- Sue Holloway (Ottawa, ON) - Olympics 1984 - Silver and Bronze medallist
- Mark Oldershaw (Burlington, ON) - Olympics 2012 - Bronze medallist
- Mark de Jonge (Halifax, NS) - Olympics 2012 - Bronze medallist
- Thomas Hall (Pointe-Claire, QC) - Olympics 2008 - Bronze medallist
- Stephen Giles (Lake Echo, NS) - Olympics 2000 - Bronze medallist
- John Wood (Toronto, ON) - Olympics 1976 - Silver medallist
- Frank Amyot (Ottawa, ON) - Olympics 1936 - Gold Medallist

=== Whitewater ===
Canoe Kayak Canada maintains a whitewater canoe and kayak discipline in much the same manner as flatwater in that both disciplines are contested at the Summer Olympic Games.

Several whitewater disciplines are supported: Whitewater Slalom (Canoe & Kayak), Freestyle Kayaking (Playboating) and Canoe polo.

Member clubs of the CKC are located in British Columbia, Alberta, Ontario and Quebec.Club List by Province

Notable athletes developed by CanoeKayak Canada who have qualified to compete at the Olympic Games include David Ford (1992, 1996, 2004, 2008) and Margaret Langford (1992, 1996, 2000).

=== Marathon ===
CanoeKayak Canada maintains a marathon racing paddle discipline along with the flatwater and whitewater.
