= Thunderbird 26 =

Sailboat designed 1958 by Ben Seaborn

Development
- Designer: Ben Seaborn
- Year: 1958

Boat
- Draft: 5 ft (1.5 m)

Hull
- Type: Monohull
- Hull weight: 3,850 lb (1,750 kg)
- LOA: 25 ft 11 in (7.90 m)
- LWL: 20 ft 3 in (6.17 m)
- Beam: 7 ft 8 in (2.34 m)

Hull appendages
- Keel: Fixed - 1,534 lb (696 kg)

Rig
- Mast height: 37 ft (11 m)

Sails
- Total sail area: 308 ft^{2} (28.6 m^{2})

The Thunderbird class sailboat was designed in 1958 by Seattle Washington naval architect Ben Seaborn, in response to a request from the Douglas Fir Plywood Association (now APA - The Engineered Wood Association) of Tacoma, Washington for design proposals for a sailboat that would "... be both a racing and cruising boat; provide sleeping accommodations for four crew; be capable of being built by reasonably skilled amateurs; provide auxiliary power by an outboard motor that could be easily removed and stowed; and out-perform other sailboats in its class."

== Design and construction ==
T-Birds can be built of marine plywood, usually fiberglass-covered for minimum maintenance, or with a fiberglass hull and deck. The International Thunderbird Class Association (ITCA) maintains specifications of what dimensions and specifications fit the definition of the Thunderbird class. Many plywood T-Birds have been built by amateur builders, while fiberglass T-Birds usually are built by professional boatbuilders, although plans also are available for "one-off" construction of fiberglass T-Birds by amateur builders.

In North America, professional builders of fiberglass T-Birds are located in Canada (Victoria, British Columbia and Toronto, Ontario). In Australia, where T-Birds also are popular, fiberglass T-Birds are built using hull and deck molds owned by the Australian Thunderbird Class Association. Fiberglass boat parts—such as a complete deck, cabin and cockpit; hatches for the main cabin and forward and aft decks, and a lightweight, foam-filled fiberglass spade rudder—are available from fiberglass boat builders, to modernize or restore older T-Birds.

The 37 ft (11 m) mast, 13.50-foot (4.11 m) boom and 8-foot (2.44 m) spinnaker pole can be built of wood, but most boatbuilders and owners now choose ready-made aluminum spars from a source that meets ITCA specifications, for low maintenance and high performance. Dacron sailcloth is used for the mainsail, genoa and working jib, and nylon for the spinnaker. An alternate dacron/mylar film sailcloth laminate also is approved for the genoa. Only one size of mainsail, genoa, working jib and spinnaker are authorized by ITCA for racing. In keeping with ITCA policy of maintaining the affordability of the T-Bird, only one set of new sails is permitted in a two-year period.

Used T-Birds of plywood or fiberglass construction are often available for sale in many regions where T-Bird fleets have been organized (see below). These boats offer an economical choice for the sailor interested in becoming a T-Bird owner. Prices can range from under $2,000 for older wood boats that may need restoration or repair in various degrees, up to about $20,000 for a completely equipped newer fiberglass boat in championship form. Average prices for boats in good cruising or racing condition in the U.S. and Canada are typically in the range of $5,000 to $13,000, depending on local market conditions. Compared to other sailboats in this size range, such boats can be considered bargains in terms of racing and cruising performance, and cost.

== Plan and specifications ==
Schematic

Mainsail Dimensions:

P	31.0 ft
E	13.0 ft
I	26.75 ft
J	8.0 ft

== Adaptability ==
Its 7.54 foot (2.30 m) beam makes it possible to haul the boat by trailer, without special permits, for launching, winter storage and for traveling to long-distance racing or cruising destinations.
