= Dobson Yacht Club =

Yacht club in Nova Scotia, Canada

Coordinates: 46°08′14″N 60°12′16″W

- Burgee of the Dobson Yacht Club
- Abbreviation: DYC
- Formation: 1953
- Legal status: Active
- Purpose: Advocate and public voice, educator and network for recreational and competitive sailors, coaches, volunteers and events
- Location: 600 Westmount Road, Westmount, Nova Scotia, Canada B1R 1A6
- Official language: English, French
- Commodore: Dave Ingraham
- Website: dobsonyachtclub.org

Dobson Yacht Club (DYC) is a private yacht club based in Westmount, Nova Scotia, Canada. The Dobson Yacht Club sits on the western shore of the South Arm of Sydney Harbour, directly opposite the Sydney downtown area, part of the Cape Breton Regional Municipality. Its location on the chart (4266 Sydney Harbour) is shown as Dobson's Point, formerly known as Shingle Point.

== History ==
The Dobson Yacht Club came to be in the year 1953, a time of relative prosperity in Cape Breton. Sydney Steel was booming and coal was still "King". It was a time of rebuilding and hard work following the war, but it was also a time when recreation was important as a diversion from the everyday realities of life.

One such diversion was Snipe racing. These small sailing vessels provided an inexpensive form of entertainment. Sydney Harbour's only yacht club, the Royal Cape Breton was reaping the benefits of the increase in the number of Snipe racing enthusiasts. However, several members of the Royal Cape Breton's Snipe Sailing Fleet had become disillusioned with some of the restrictive practices of that club so they began to consider starting their own yacht club.

They didn't have any property, but they were drawn to a piece of land known as Shingle Point, located opposite the harbour. This land offered a secure mooring spot on its southwest side, perfect for the Snipe fleet. Shingle Point was part of the "Dobson Estate," which was situated across from the Westmount Highway. This estate, originally granted by the Crown to the Dobson family, included all the waterfront rights adjacent to it.

By 1953, the estate was owned by Mr. Sidney Dobson and some of his sisters. Among those working to set up a second yacht club in Sydney Harbour was a young man named Roy Mac Keen. His mother, Myrtle Mac Keen (born Dobson), was one of the sisters managing the Dobson Estate. She also strongly supported the initiative that had captivated her son.

Negotiations began between the sailors and the Dobson family and a price of $3,000 was placed on the property. Twelve original members paid $100 each, plus a membership fee of $20. Some of the members fronted a loan for the balance and, in late 1953, adopting the name of its benefactor, The Dobson Yacht Club was born.

The original clubhouse was a shack from the construction site of the then-new Federal Building on Dorchester Street. In the spring of 1954, the water's edge in the southwest cove was only 9–12 metres from the clubhouse itself. The next order of business was to purchase a new clubhouse.

At this time the old military barracks on Royal Avenue, near the Sydney City Hospital, were being sold for one dollar each with the condition that they be removed from the site. After purchasing one of these buildings the members hired Mr. W. Carson to move the building. This was done by separating the building in two and moving it through the streets of Sydney down to the Cape Breton Dairy on the waterfront and then floating the structures across the harbour on a barge in September 1955.

During the mid-fifties to mid-sixties, the Snipe Sailing Team from Dobson became a force to be reckoned within maritime racing circles. The team won the Provincial Snipe Championships three times, the Maritime Championship three times and the Dominion Championship once. Many other trophies, including the McCurdy Cup (emblematic of the Championship of the Bras d'Or Lakes) took their place at Dobson.

== Facilities ==
The club is open year-round, navigation is limited by ice January through April.

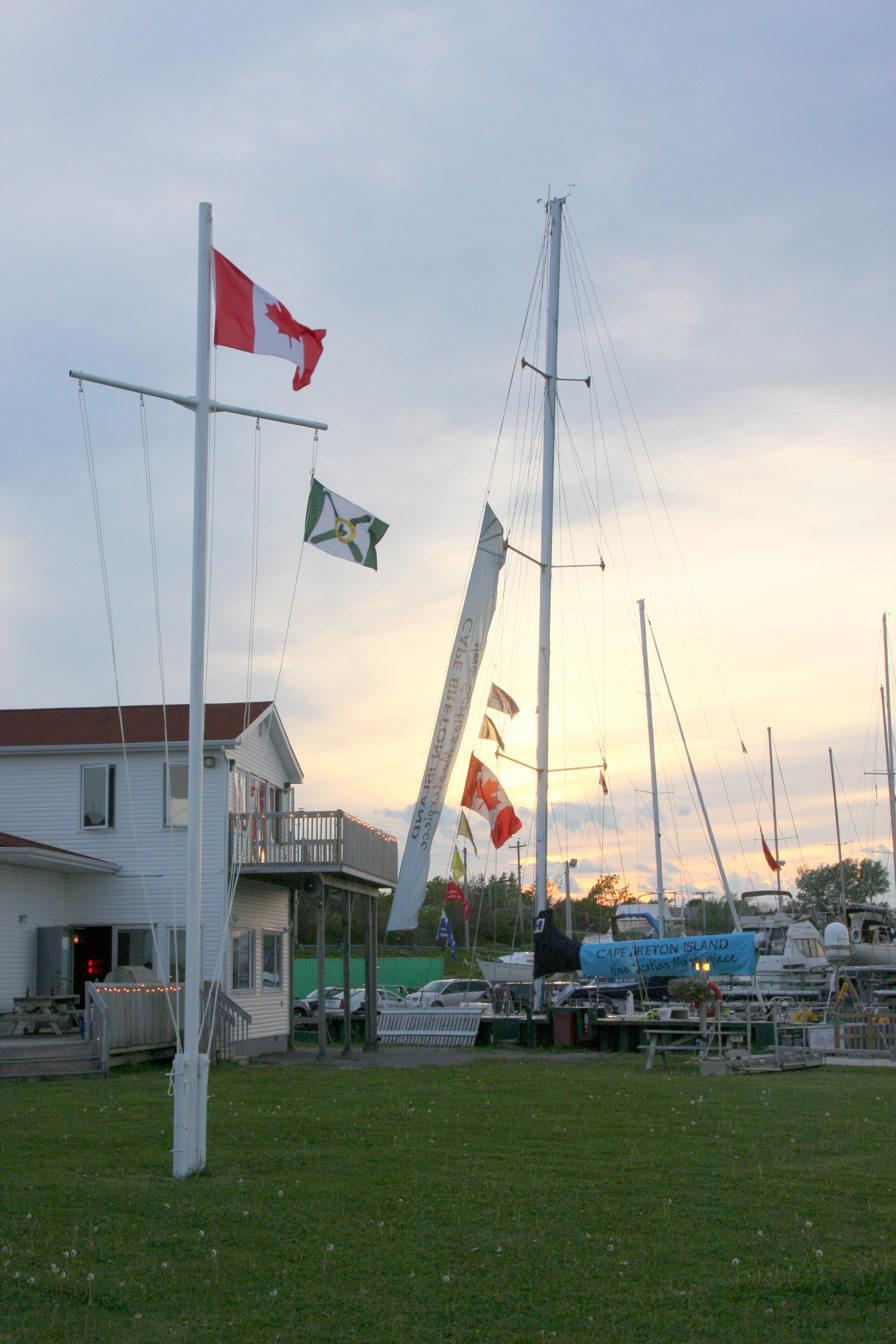
The harbour side lawn of the Dobson Yacht Club during a visit by the Clipper Round the World Yacht Race Clipper 68 Cape Breton Island.

=== Formalities ===
- Vessels arriving from another country must report to Canada Border Services Agency at 1 888 226 7277.

=== Marina facilities ===
- Protection/shelter - good from all directions. Yacht club is 10 nautical miles (12 mi; 19 km) from open sea.
- Approach and entrance - safe, easy, used by largest cruise ships
- Slips & Moorings - club wharves provide over 500 feet (150 m) of dockage, and a well-protected basin holds an additional forty-nine boats at floating docks.
- Maximum length - 100 feet (30 m)
- Depths at slips - 9 feet (2.7 m)
- Water - dockside water, chlorine and fluoride free from the club's own wells
- Electric - 15 amp power available at floating docks, wharves and camber
- Fuel - gas and diesel (Dobson Yacht Club has the only dockside fueling facility in Sydney Harbour)
- Weather forecast - VHF
- Security - unfenced, security not an issue in this low-crime area.
- Internet access - free wireless internet covers the club grounds and a computer terminal in the clubhouse is available for guests (password available at bar)
- Other marina facilities, services and supplies - washrooms, showers, laundromat are available to visiting yachts (0700 - 2400).

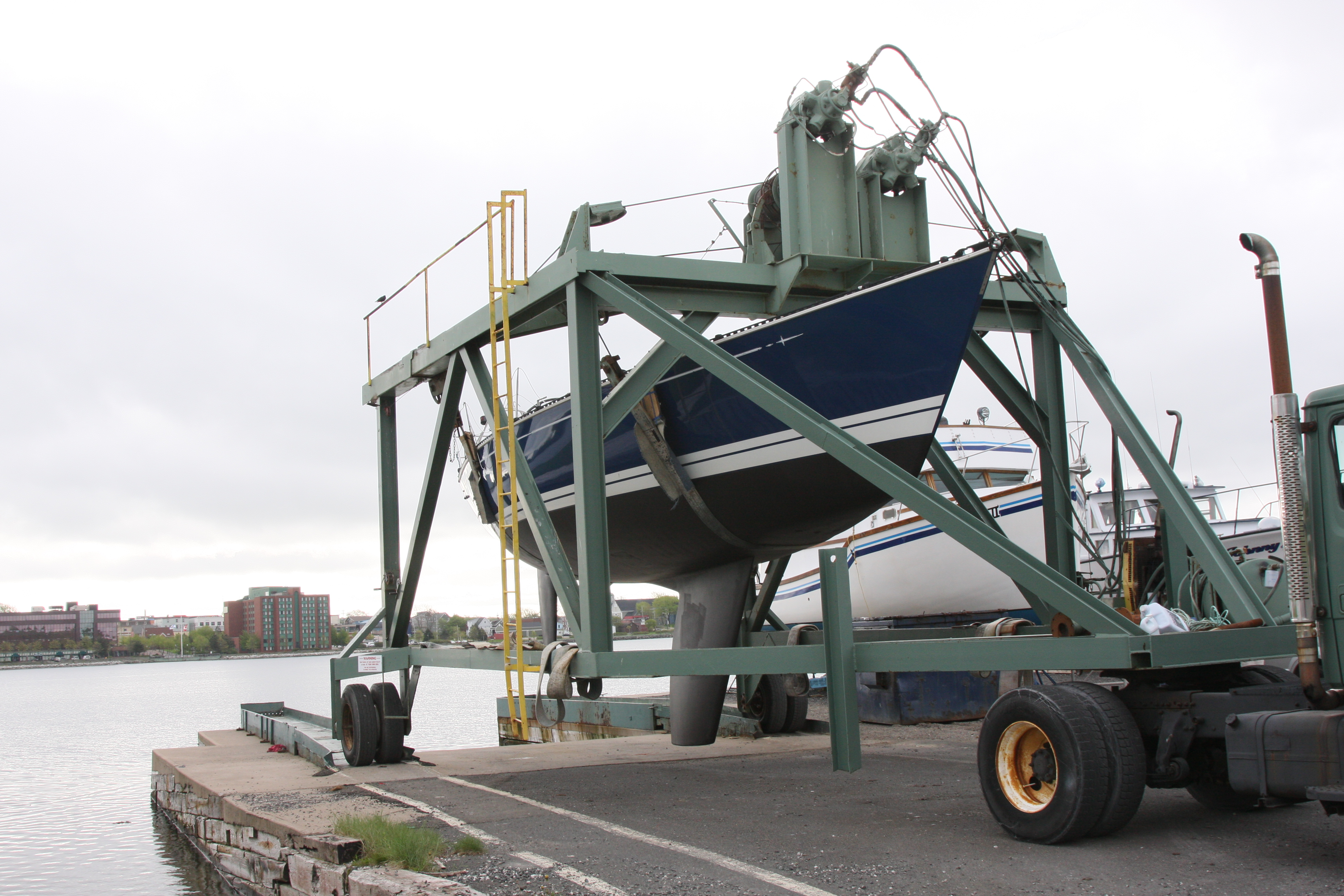
The 18-tonne (20-ton) travel lift of the Dobson Yacht Club. It can lift boats with length to 50 feet (15 m), beam to 15 feet (4.6 m), draft to 8 feet (2.4 m). The boat shown in the slings is 40 feet (12 m) long and draws 8 feet 2 inches (2.49 m)

=== Boatyard facilities and services ===
- 18-tonne (20-ton) travel lift can lift boats with length to 50 feet (15 m), beam to 15 feet (4.6 m), draft to 8 feet (2.4 m).
- Launch ramp for trailers or commercial lift
- Mast crane dockside at camber
- Boat storage is available throughout the year.

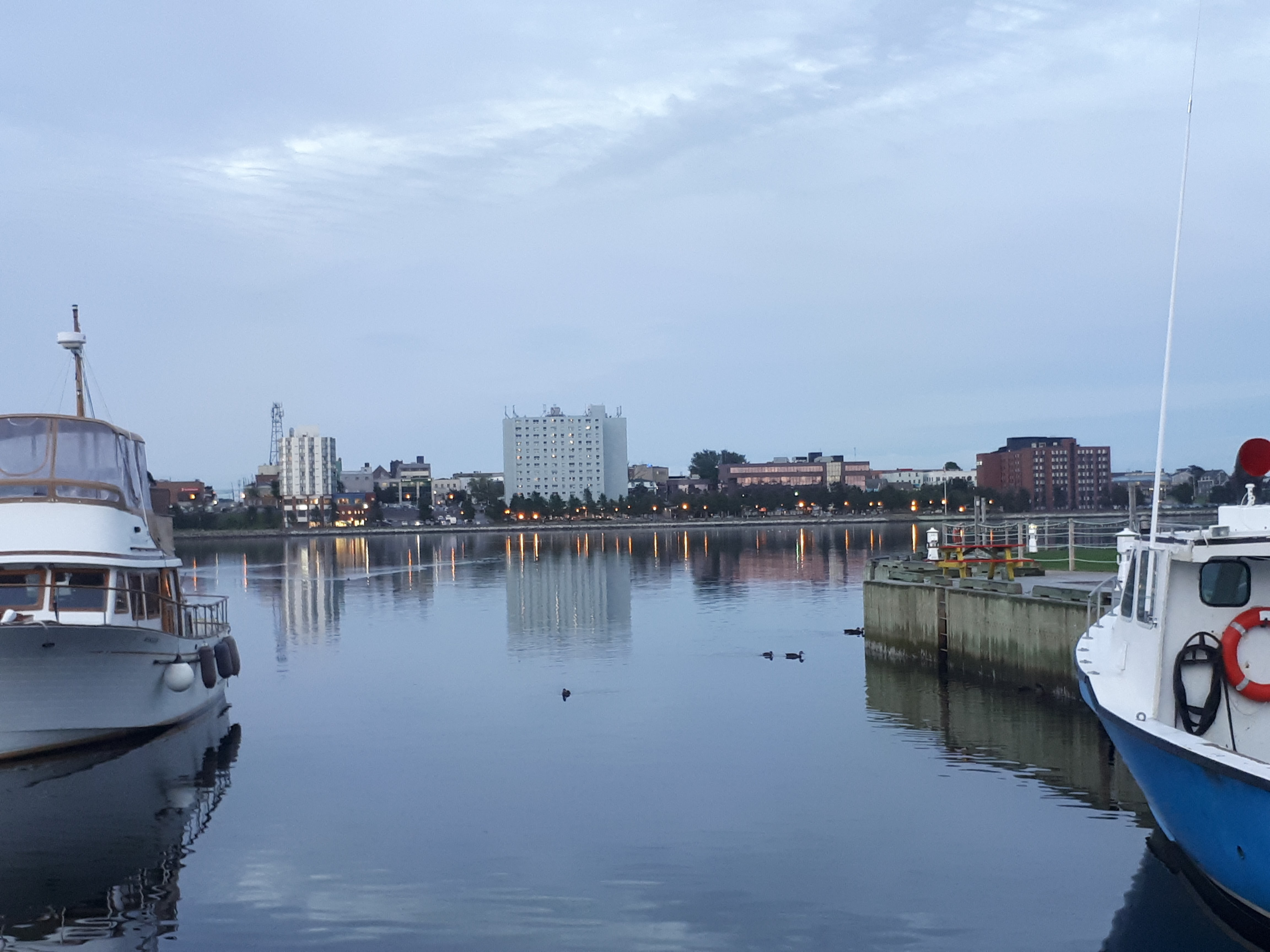
The Sydney waterfront as seen from the Dobson Yacht Club

=== Clubhouse facilities ===
- Members and guests lounge and bar open 7 days a week, noon to 11:00pm
- Full kitchen facilities in clubhouse (self serve only, no restaurant on-site)
- Decks overlooking the harbour and marina
- Picnic tables on club's waterside lawn
- Washrooms and showers: 7:00am to 11:00pm. Washrooms and showers are available to members and visitors paying dockage. There is no additional charge for showers.
- Coin-operated washer and dryer in clubhouse
- Ice available at the clubhouse Bar
- ATM located in clubhouse
- Short and long term on-site parking for members and guests' vehicles
- VHF access-club monitors channels 16 and 68

=== Local services ===
- Shopping and dining at area merchants approximately 2 miles (3.2 km)

== Regattas ==
Dobson Splash Fest - The Dobson YC Fishing Boat Races and Sailing Regatta is usually held the first weekend after Labour Day. This end-of-season event is a party for working fishing vessels and crews, with exhibits by marine equipment and service suppliers. Two days of sailboat and fishing boat racing, dances, poker runs, fun events, and entertainment for the children.

== Traditions ==
A 5-foot model of Bluenose has been on display in Dobson Yacht Club's main entrance showcase since 2009.
