= Britannia, Ottawa =

Britannia
- Neighbourhood
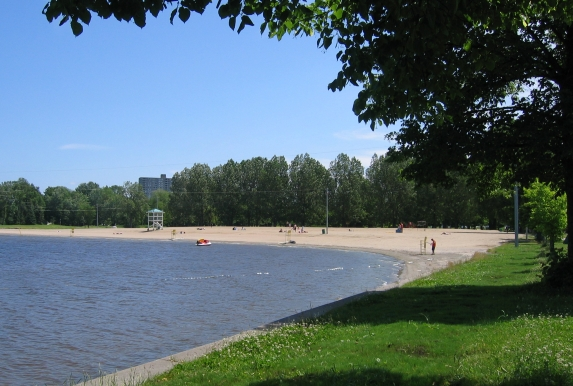
- Britannia Beach
- Nickname: Britannia
- Location in Ottawa
- Coordinates: 45°21′54″N 75°48′07″W
- Country: Canada
- Province: Ontario
- City: Ottawa
- City Ward: Bay
- Established: 1818

Government
  - MPs: Anita Vandenbeld
  - MPPs: Chandra Pasma
  - Councillors: Theresa Kavanagh
  - Governing body: Britannia Village Community Association
  - President: Karen Patzer

Area
  - Land: 2.121 km^{2} (0.819 sq mi)
- Elevation: 70 m (230 ft)

Population (2016)
  - Total: 6,692
  - Density: 3,155/km^{2} (8,172/sq mi)
- Canada 2016 Census
- Time zone: UTC−5 (Eastern (EST))
  - Summer (DST): UTC−4 (EDT)

Britannia is a group of neighbourhoods in Bay Ward in the west end of Ottawa, Ontario, Canada. It is located on the Ottawa River across from Aylmer, Quebec, adjacent to its namesake, Britannia Bay, north of Richmond Road, west of the Kichi Zibi Mikan and east of Boyce Avenue. The total population of this area was 6,692 as of the 2016 census. The area constituted a municipal ward from 1973 to 1994 (Britannia Ward).

The area has a mix of low and high income housing. The lower income areas of the area are closer to Richmond Road in the south, and the more affluent areas are located in the community of Britannia Village in the north, which includes the Britannia Yacht Club at the north end of Britannia Road.

Many of Britannia's old cottages live on as bungalows. It is surrounded by water, forest, and hills.

The Ottawa River Pathway is a very long segment of Capital Pathway along the south bank of almost the entire length Ottawa's portion of the Ottawa River. A bike path extends from Britannia some 12 kilometres to the Parliament buildings downtown. Today, there is probably no neighbourhood in Ottawa more mixed than Britannia forming a contrast with many of the homogenized satellite communities that have become Ottawa.

== History ==
This land where Britannia stands was once a part of a large estate, owned by Captain John LeBreton in 1818. John LeBreton advertised the sale of real estate in the village area in 1828. LCol Joseph Bouchette referred to Lac Deschênes as Chaudiere Lake in 1832. Around 1876, an apple orchard near the head of the rapids was undermined and washed away during a big flood.

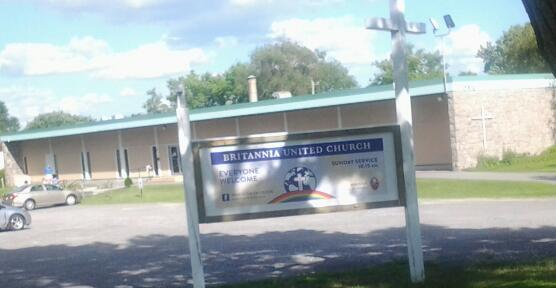
Britannia United Church

The Britannia Methodist Church formed in 1873 and celebrated its 140th anniversary in 2013. The Church grew out of services held in the home of Ira Honeywell, the first settler in Nepean Township. Members had been meeting in homes since 1869. In 1911, the Neogothic Britannia Heights Methodist Church was erected at Carling & Richmond. Renamed the Britannia United Church in 1925 after the amalgamation of the United Church of Canada. After her congregation moved to Britannia United on Pinecrest Road in 1961, the building was used to sell Macintosh & Watts china, to sell paintings and as a construction shack until it burned down in 1975.

It was once a small mill owned by Mr John Jamieson to the west of Ottawa. A cottage town and boating club developed around the site of the old mill; Mr. John Jamieson made a pretty resort out of what was once a sand beach.

The Britannia Bay post office was established in 1889, under the community's first postmistress Mrs C Hand.

The "G.B. Greene", known as 'Queen of the River,' a double-decked side wheeler steamer built by the Upper Ottawa Improvement Company in 1896, took up to 250 passengers up the Ottawa River to Chats Falls on daily pleasure excursions. Although she was dismantled in 1946, her anchor remains at Britannia Beach today.

In 1899, the Ottawa Electric Railway Company built a street-car line to Britannia. In 1899, the Metropolitan Power Company was formed to construct a power house just north of the Britannia Boathouse Club with a 2000-foot canal to extend to the lower end of the Lac Deschênes Rapids. The area became popular at the turn of the century because the Ottawa Gas and Electric company extended the trolley line and created an amusement park at Britannia beach to encourage users of the trolley system to use the system on weekends. A cottage and beach community resulted.

The first trip of the Ottawa Electric Railway Car 202 Britannia-on-the-Bay on the Britannia Line was January 13, 1900. The electric line to the village on Britannia Bay was open for regular traffic in the spring 1900.

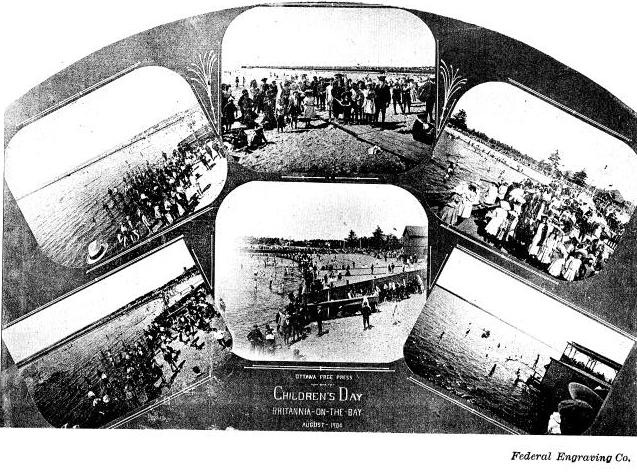
Children's Day 1904 Britannia-On-The-Bay

By 1904, the trolley company had built a wide pier 1,000 feet long out into the river. Along the east side, there were cottages, and the Boat club house. Along the south side, the land between the road and the lake has been turned into a park, with pavilions and bath houses. The beach was ideal for bathing, since people could wade out almost to the end of the pier without danger. The village, with its two churches and neat cottages, was one of Ottawa's most fashionable suburbs in 1904. Justice Mosgrove had a 35-acre grape farm, not far from Britannia Park, on the river.

Albert Bedingfield's stencil designs, now in the Library and Archives Canada collection, were published by Britannia-Bay, Ottawa, Ont.

During World War I, men were encouraged to join the 207th (Ottawa-Carleton) Battalion, CEF at the Britannia Pier.

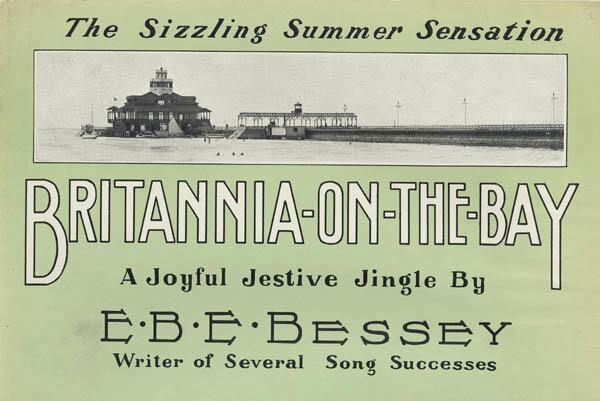
Britannia On The Bay by E B E Bessey 1909

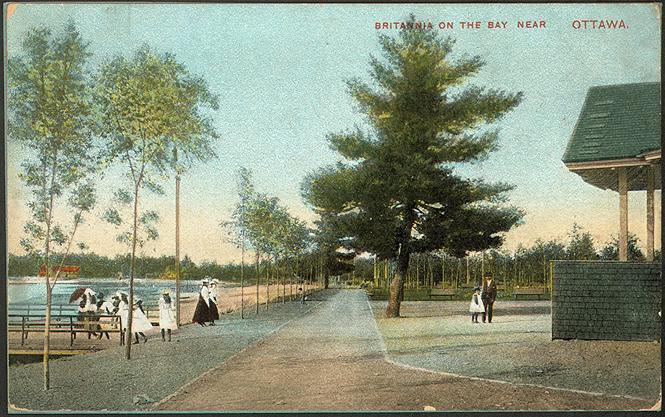
Britannia-on-the-Bay near Ottawa 1910 Postcard

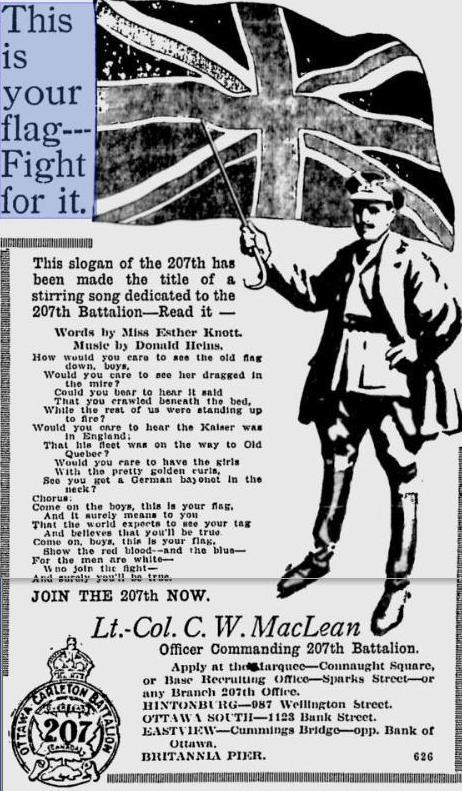
World War I recruitment ad 207th Ottawa Carleton Battalion -join at the Britannia Pier

During World War II, the Princess Alice Barracks Cabin at Britannia Bay provided a summer home for Royal Canadian Air Force (Women's Division) personnel near the Britannia Boating Club's facilities for tennis, dancing and boating. Rented from the King's Daughter's Guild of Ottawa, the cabin featured 60 beds, a separate cookhouse and dining pavilion. The cabin had served the King's Daughter's Guild of Ottawa since 1913 as a Fresh Air Cottage for mothers and undernourished children. After the war, the Fresh Air Cottages were rented to families as year round apartments. During a kitchen fire at the Fresh Air Cottage on December 11, 1952, Roger Murphy, aged 2 died and 26 residents were left temporarily homeless. The Fresh Air Cottage on Cassels Street, was expropriated and demolished, and is now part of the conservation area around Mud Lake.

Rapid growth in all directions during the 20th century meant that it was soon surrounded by the western suburb of Nepean. Larger, modern houses were built in between cottages. Nowadays it is simply an out-of-the-way part of west end of Ottawa, featuring among other things Barks and Bubbles dog-washing business, Regina Street Public School, a movie theatre complex, Britannia Baptist Church, a Britannia Conservation area centred on the National Capital Commission's (Mud Lake), and Britannia beach.

Although Thomas Ahearn's hydroelectric project was abandoned as unfeasible, the unfinished canal was used in 1951 by Past Commodores Thomas G. Fuller and Reginald G. Bruce with volunteer labour provided by Club members as the basis of the Britannia Yacht Club protected harbour. Today, the BYC harbour provides 250 wet moorings, fuel and pump out facilities, for both sail and power boats.

The Britannia Water Purification Plant, commissioned and constructed between 1958 and 1961, is one of two water purification plants that serve the City of Ottawa's residents. The 23,000 m2 plant, which is situated on 18.7 hectares of city property draws from the Ottawa River and treats an average of about 175 megalitres of water a day.

The neighbourhood has a perhaps one of its kind 1967 EXPO style dome covering a local children's hockey rink that made it to the top 500 architecturally significant buildings in Canada in 2002 as voted by CIRA.

In 1976, an article in the Ottawa Citizen described real estate prices in Britannia and in the older Britannia Bay area: semi detached houses ($48,000), duplexes ($65–70,000), 3 & 4 story apartment buildings and is surrounded by highrises; 15 three story townhouses on Kehoe ($95–100,000); older converted cottages ($38–45,000); and two story townhouses on Bradford rented for $250–300 a month. In 1976, schools in the neighbourhood included Regina Public School, Grant School (now closed) and St. Leonard's School.

The neighbourhood and, is the former home of the Ottawa Folk Festival at Britannia Park.

In 2003, Canadian Hydrographic Service published "1550, Britannia Bay to Chat Falls", which was 4 maps on 1 sheet; Previous editions of the cartographic material were produced in 1961, '62, '69, '73, '77, '82, '86, and '96.

In 2003, the City of Ottawa erected a Heritage Designation plaque for William Murphy House, 127 Britannia Road. The house sustained major damage during a fire in April 2020, killing all three residents.

In 2010, the City of Ottawa erected a Heritage Designation plaque for Old St. Stephen's Church, 181 Britannia Road. "Built in 1892, Old St. Stephen's Church was one of two churches built to serve the fashionable 19th century resort community of Britannia, and is the only one remaining today. A vernacular interpretation of the Gothic Revival style, it features the pointed-arch windows and door, simple rectangular form and tower commonly associated with the style. Old St. Stephen's Church is now a private residence."

== Sports ==
The Britannia Yacht Club was established in 1887. The Club house still retains its historic appearance. Members of the club have won many championships and Olympic gold medals. Canada's only Gold medal winner from the 1936 Summer Olympics, Frank Amyot, paddled these waters in the 1920s and 1930s. The Club's Dragon Lounge's bar was fashioned out of a dragon sail boat.

The Britannia Football Club began playing in 1882. Being one of the first Canadian football teams ever, they played the Montreal Football Club to a 0-0 tie on May 13, 1882. They competed in almost every Quebec Rugby Football Union season from 1882 to 1903

== Sub-neighbourhoods ==
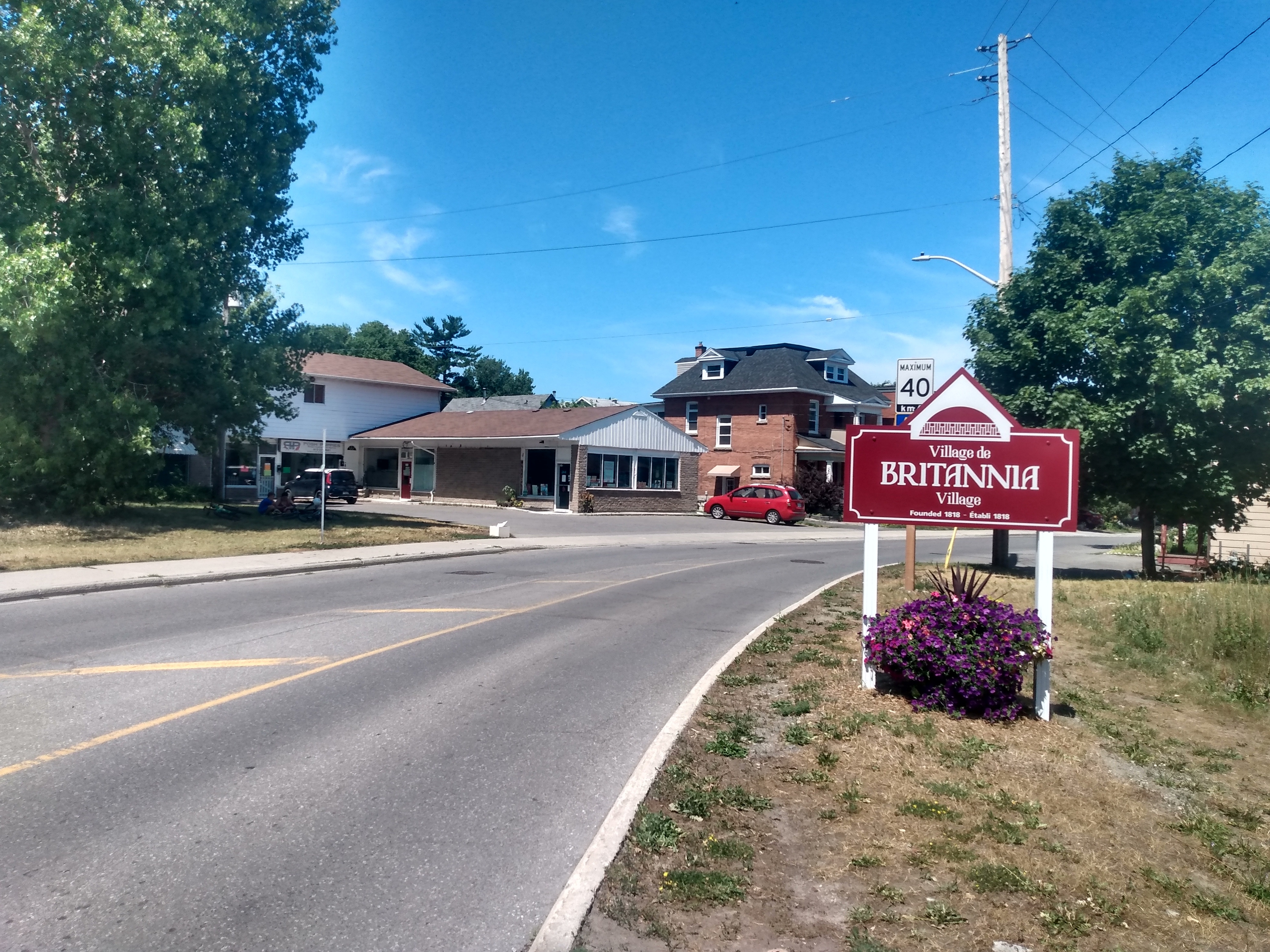
Entrance to Britannia Village

- Belltown
- Britannia Bay
- Britannia Heights
- Britannia Village
- Britannia Woods
- Lincoln Heights
- Loma Park
- Michele Heights

== Gallery ==
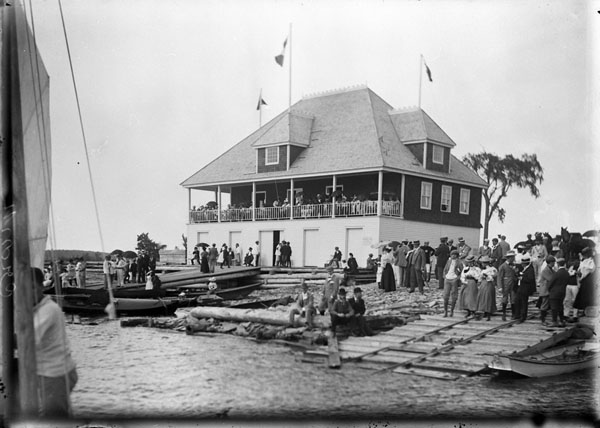
Britannia Boating Club 1896 by William James Topley

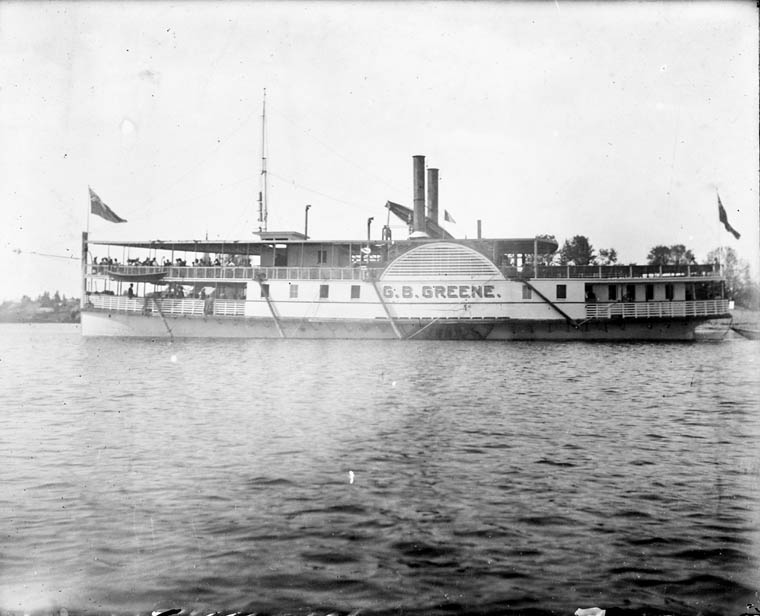
Steamer GB Greene

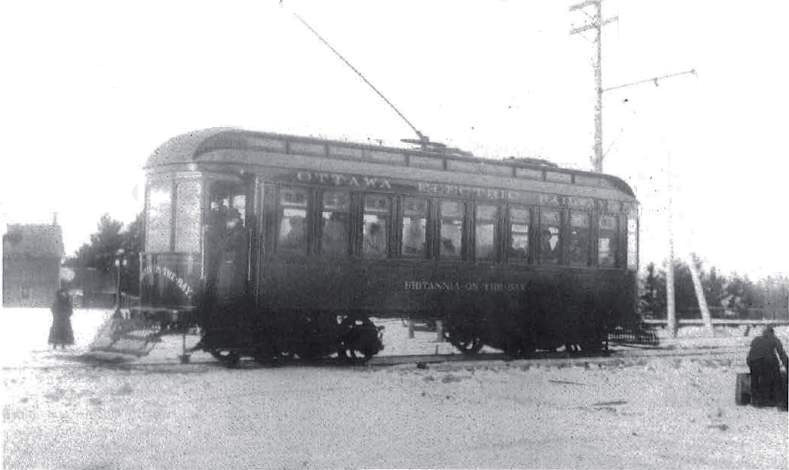
Ottawa Electric Railway Car Britannia on the Bay 1900 by Andrew Merrilees
Britannia yacht club est 1887 in Britannia, Ottawa, Ontario

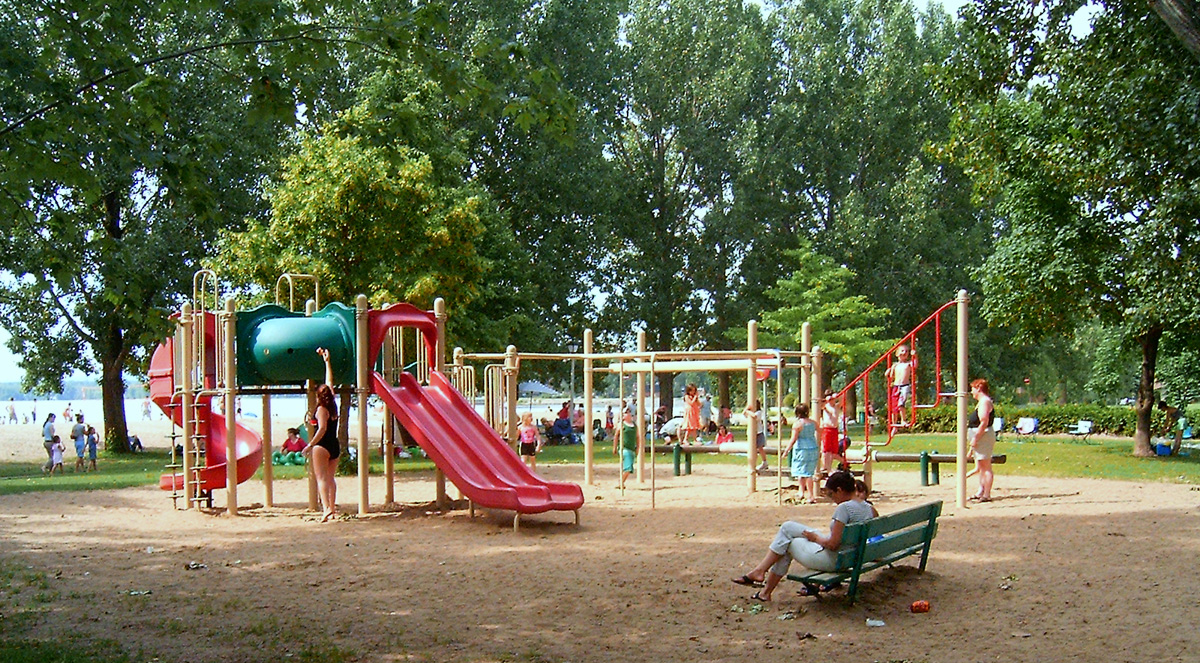
Relaxing summer day at Brittania Beach

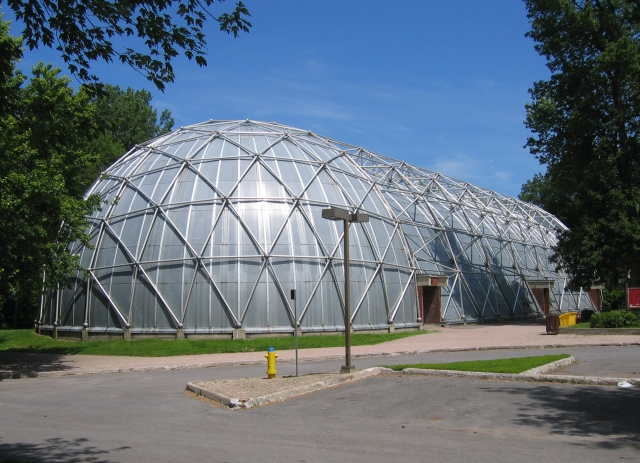
Belltown Dome

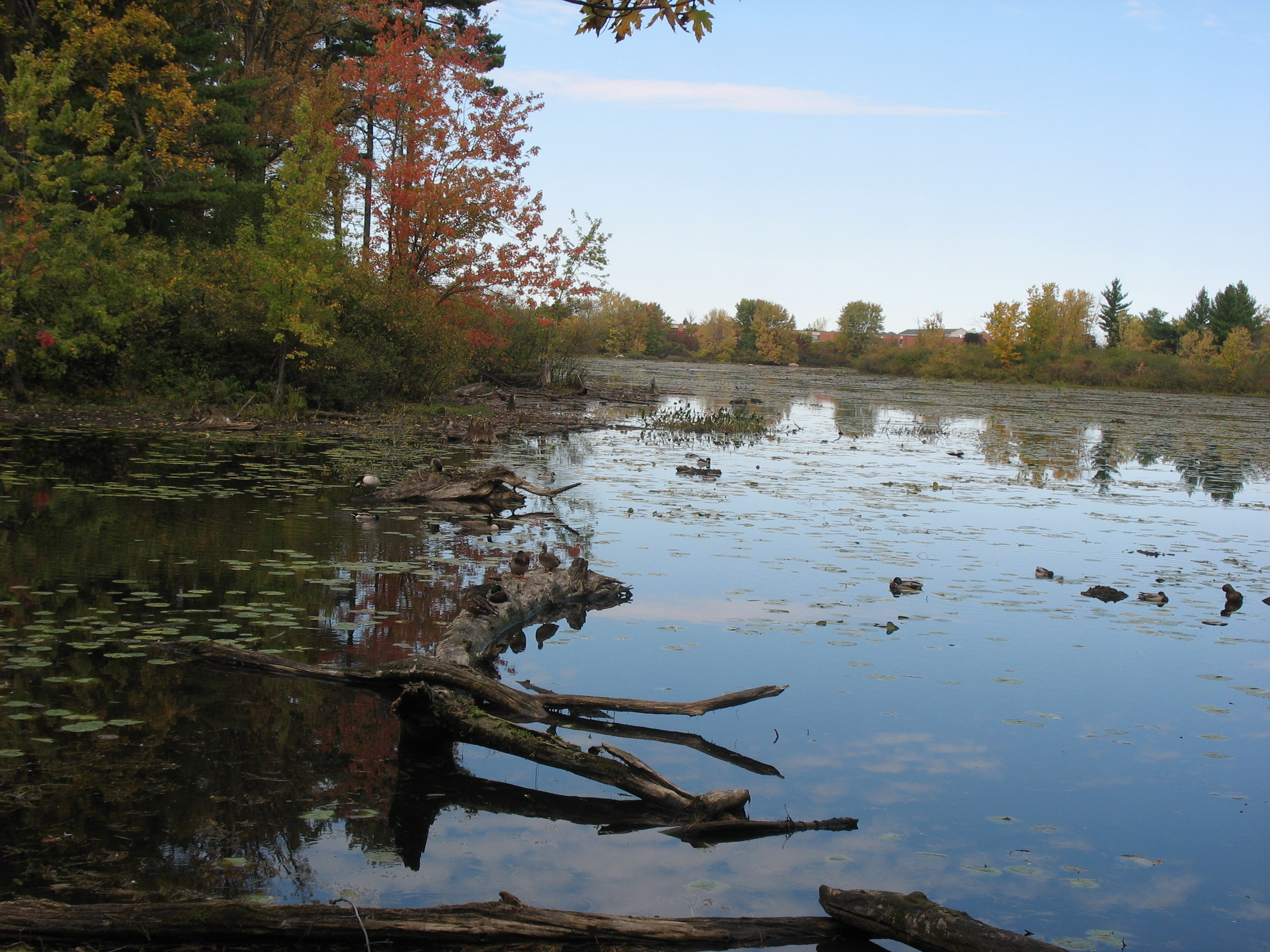
Mud Lake, Britannia, Ottawa

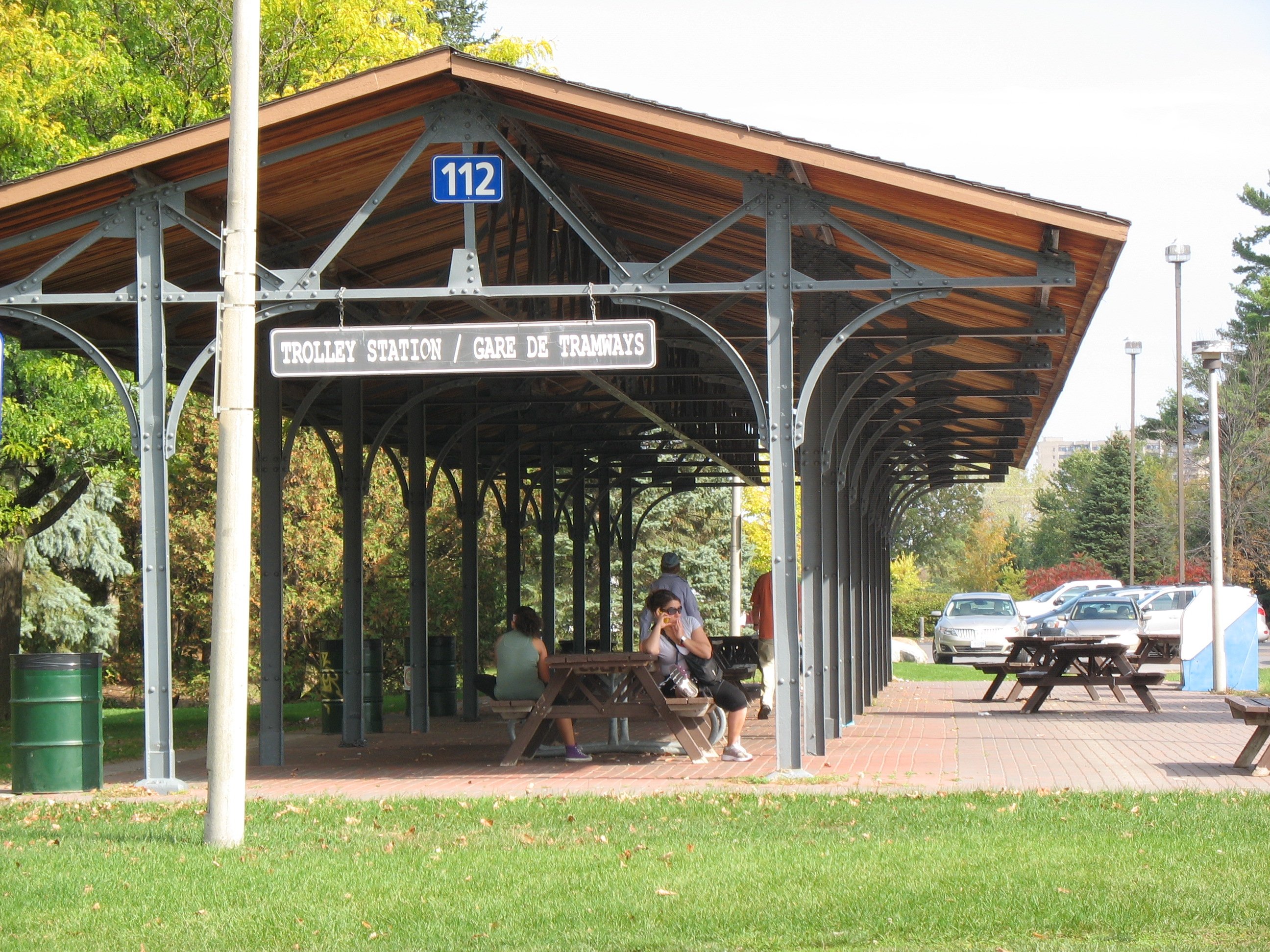
An old streetcar station, Britannia, Ottawa

== Notable residents ==
- Adam Acres, a member of the House of Commons of Canada, owned a farm situated on Britannia Bay on the Ottawa River
- Thomas Ahearn, was instrumental in the development of a 2000-foot canal just north of the Britannia Boathouse Club to generate electricity; The canal is now used by the Britannia Yacht Club as a sheltered harbour.
- Dick Bell, a member of the Canadian House of Commons owned a farm "Fairfields", situated on Britannia Bay. The Dick Bell Park, which houses the Nepean Sailing Club was named in his honour.
- Captain Thomas G. Fuller was a Canadian naval officer who earned renown in the Second World War for his actions as a member of the Coastal Forces of the Royal Navy. His estate was the Moorings across the street from the Britannia Yacht Club. He converted a former tugboat, G.B. Patee II, (1904), into a brigantine tall ship, the STV Black Jack. In the 1980s, he designed and built a brigantine, the STV Fair Jeanne, which was named in honour of his wife. Today, the ships are flagships of the Bytown Brigantine sail training program.
- Ezekiel Stone Wiggins, a teacher, amateur meteorologist and his wife, writer Susie Anna Wiggins built Arbour House, a Designated Heritage Property 1994, as their summer home. Currently housing the Arbour House Studios, 105 Britannia Road, the corner tower, shingled gables and irregular plan are typical of the Queen Anne Revival-style.
- Paul Wyczynski, Ottawa University Professor. In 1968 he was named Professor of the year. From 1963 to 1969 he was a member of the Royal Commission on Bilingualism and Biculturalism. In 1988 he was knighted by the French government, was named Officer of the Order of Canada in 1993, was awarded the Commander's Cross of the Order of Merit by the government of Poland in 2001 and was awarded the Lorne Pearce Award by the Royal Society of Canada in 2006. Over his career he authored and co-authored more than 65 books and numerous articles. He was a proud and dedicated resident of Britannia for almost 50 years until his death in 2008.
- Alex Cullen and Theresa Kavanagh, former and current city councillors for the local ward.
- Bruce Kirby 3 time Olympian in sailing. Designer of the single-handed Laser dinghy to the 12-meter class Louis Vuitton Cup yacht, Canada One. Member of the order of Canada and sailing hall of fame.
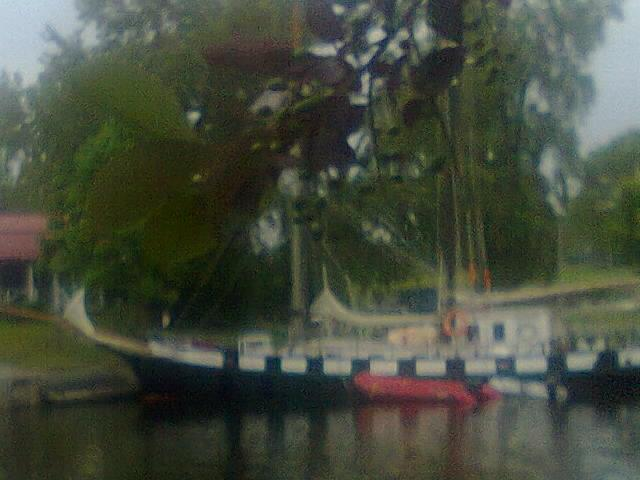
STV Black Jack, brigantine tall ship at Britannia Yacht Club

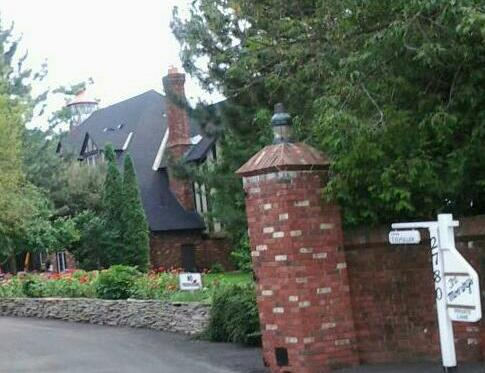
The Moorings, Fuller home, Britannia, Ottawa

== Notable architecture ==
Property	Address	Ward	Construction Date	Architect	Photo
Arbour House	84 Bradford Road	Bay	1892		|
Britannia Yacht Club	Castle Road	Bay	1896	Edgar Lewis Horwood	
Britannia Yacht Club	Castle Road	Bay	1906–1918	Charles Penruddocke William Kivas Band	
Old St. Stephen's Church	181 Britannia Road	Bay	1892		
William Murphy House	127 Britannia Road	Bay	18..		
Rowatt House	Britannia Road	Bay	18..		|
The TreeHouse	109 Britannia Road	Bay	2012	Clea and Colin Lipsett	|

== See also ==
- List of Ottawa neighbourhoods
- Geography of Ottawa
