= Crystal Beach, Ottawa =

Neighbourhood in Ottawa, Ontario, Canada

Coordinates: 45°21′N 75°50′W

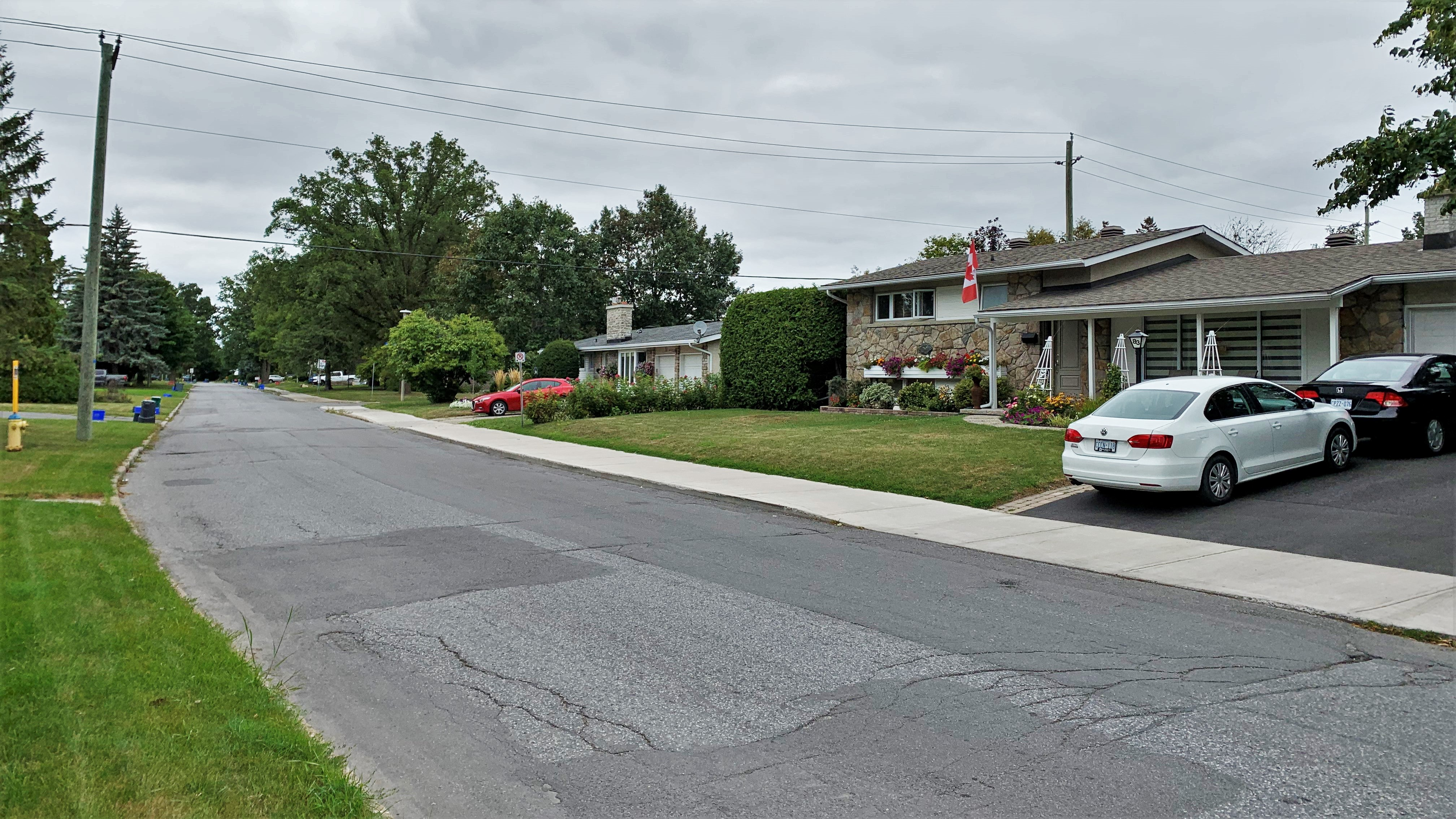
Crystal Beach Drive

Crystal Beach is a neighbourhood in Ottawa, Ontario, Canada. It is located in the west end of Ottawa, in Bay Ward. The neighbourhood is triangular in shape, and its boundaries can broadly be described as Carling Avenue to the northeast, Moodie Drive to the west, and Corkstown Road to the south. According to the Canada 2021 Census, the total population of the neighbourhood was 9,531.

== History ==
Crystal Beach was established in the 1960s, when the area was within Nepean Township. Primarily developed by Minto Developments Inc., many of the residences in Crystal Beach are modified versions of the five original models of homes originally built in the neighbourhood. The neighbourhood was later extended in 1974 around Carling via Corkstown Road with townhomes and in 1988 with Maki Park. Some newer portions of the neighbourhood were built by Garand Homes.

Together with the Lakeview neighbourhood south of Corkstown and the Stonehedge and Creeks End neighbourhoods east of Holly Acres Road, the area is covered by the Crystal Beach Lakeview Community Association (CBLCA). The area north of Carling is the neighbourhood of Rocky Point, Ottawa, where the CBLCA hosts the facilities of Maki House and Maki Park, which include community activities such as a variety of youth sports, as well as yoga, with many more events scheduled throughout each year as outlined on the CBLCA's website calendar.

== Schools ==
(schools within Crystal Beach boundaries)

- Lakeview Public School (Early French Immersion) JK to Grade 6
- Crystal Beach Public School for Special Education

(schools outside Crystal Beach, but which have Crystal Beach as a part of their catchment zone)

- Collège catholique Franco-Ouest (Grade 7 to 12)
- Our Lady of Peace Catholic Elementary, Bells Corners (JK to Grade 6)
- Bells Corners Public, Bells Corners (JK to Grade 6)
- St. Paul High School, 2675 Draper Avenue (Grades 7 and 8, Grades 9 to 12)
- Bell High School, Bells Corners (Grades 7 and 8, 9 to 12) community's high school

== Parks ==
- Andrew Haydon Park
- Corkstown Park - Features tennis courts a swimming pool and small sledding hill in the winter.
- Maki Park - In the winter months, Maki Park has a full skating rink and 'puddle'. This facility is supervised, lit at night, has on-site washrooms available, and full hockey boards on the main surface.
- Lakeview Park - In the winter months, Lakeview Park has two ice surfaces, a full size ice rink for hockey and a separate sheet for skating. This outdoor ice surface has been sought after by NHL teams like the Florida Panthers.
- Winthrop Park
- Dick Bell Park - The Nepean Sailing Club is located in Dick Bell Park.

== Transportation ==
Crystal Beach is a 15-minute drive from downtown, and about five minutes from Kanata. From this neighbourhood there are easy ways to access both the west end and centre of Ottawa, as Crystal Beach is served by two major arteries (Highway 417, Carling avenue).

Public transportation is provided by OC Transpo, with Route 58 as the primary route for the community as of 2021. Bayshore and Moodie station are within walking distance from certain parts of the community.

== Adjacent neighbourhoods ==
- Lakeview, Ottawa - Corkstown Road and Carling to the north, NCC Bike path to the west, Holly Acres Road to the east and Highway 417 to the south.
- Crystal Bay, Ottawa - Established in early 1900s
- Rocky Point, Ottawa - Rocky Point Established in early 1900s
