= Lac Deschênes =

Lake in Canada

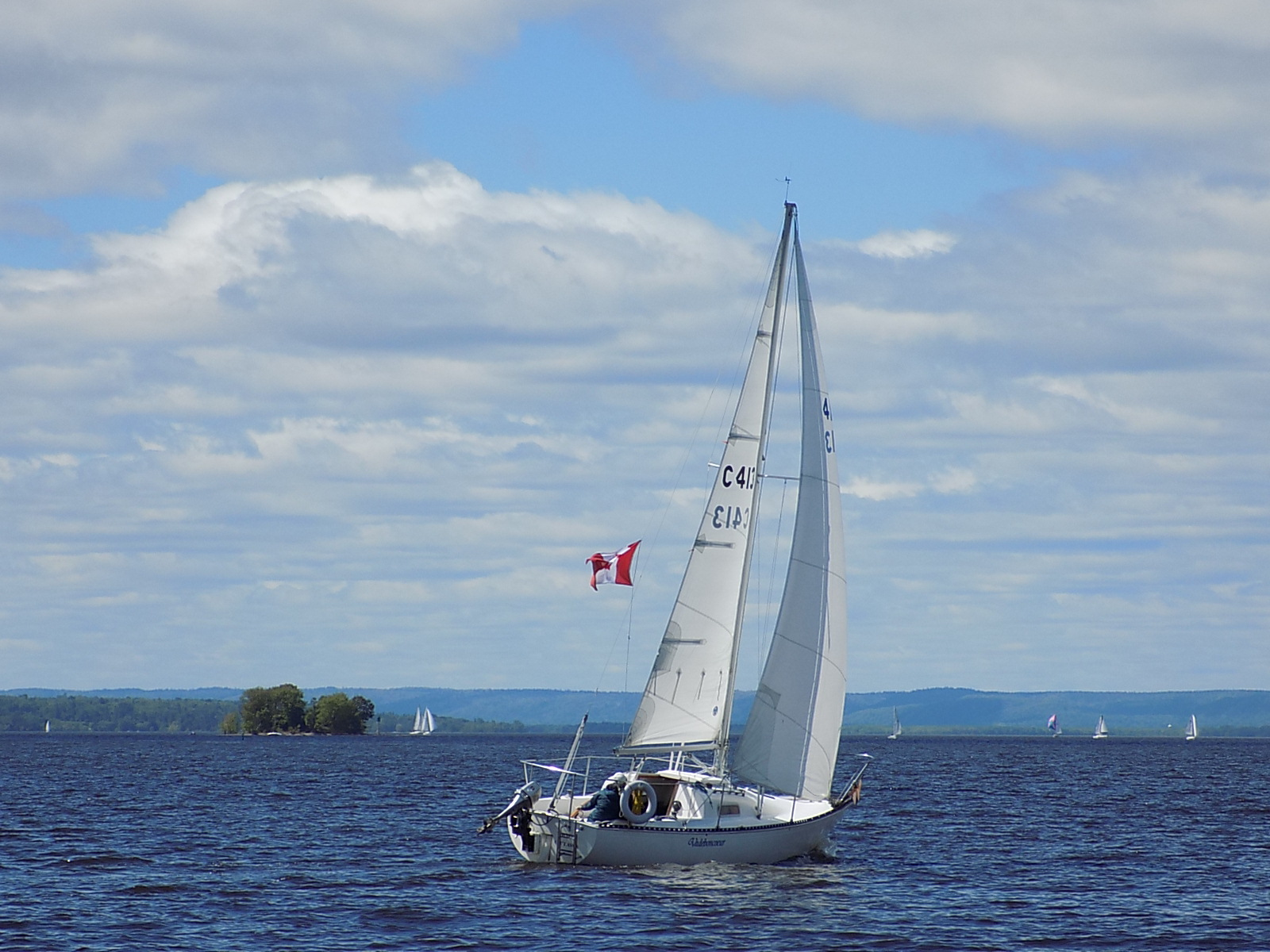

- Location within Ottawa
- Location: Ottawa, Ontario and Gatineau / Pontiac, Quebec
- Coordinates: 45°23′N 75°52′W
- Primary inflows: Ottawa River, Carp River, Constance Creek, Shirley's Brook, Watts Creek, Still Water Creek, Graham Creek
- Primary outflows: Ottawa River
- Catchment area: 90,900 km^{2} (35,100 sq mi)
- Basin countries: Canada
- Max. length: 44 km (27 mi)
- Max. width: 3.2 km (2.0 mi)
- Average depth: 9.0 m (29.5 ft)
- Max. depth: 49 m (161 ft)
- Surface elevation: 57.9 m (190 ft)
- Islands: Kedey's Island (ON), Île O'Connor (QC), Alexandra Island (ON), Île Mohr (QC), Île Allen (QC) (Twelve Mile Island), Alymer Island (ON)
- Settlements: Ottawa (ON), Gatineau (QC)

Lac Deschênes (French pronunciation: [lak deʃɛn]) is a 44-kilometre-long (27-mile) lake on the Ottawa River that runs from the Chats Falls Dam near Fitzroy Harbour in the west to the Deschênes Rapids at Britannia in the east. It is a little over 3.2 kilometres (2.0 miles) wide at its widest point and little more than a few hundred metres at its narrowest. The provincial border between Ontario and Quebec runs through the length of the lake with the City of Ottawa on its southern shore and the city of Gatineau on much of its northern shore.

The shoreline is mostly gently sloped and composed of broken limestone interspersed with smaller sections of aquatic shoreline vegetation or mudflats. Above the Chats Falls Dam is Lac des Chats. Below Britannia is a series of rapids and waterfalls culminating with the Chaudière Falls. Between the rapids and the falls, the river is not navigable.

== History ==
The lake was first known as Chaudière Lake by the first colonial settlers in the early 1800s. The original name of the village that became Aylmer was the Chaudière Farm Village, for the Chaudière Lake Farm created by Philemon Wright Jr.

As the Francophone population of the area increased, it became more commonly known as lac-Deschênes. It is now officially known by the French name only.

== Recreation ==
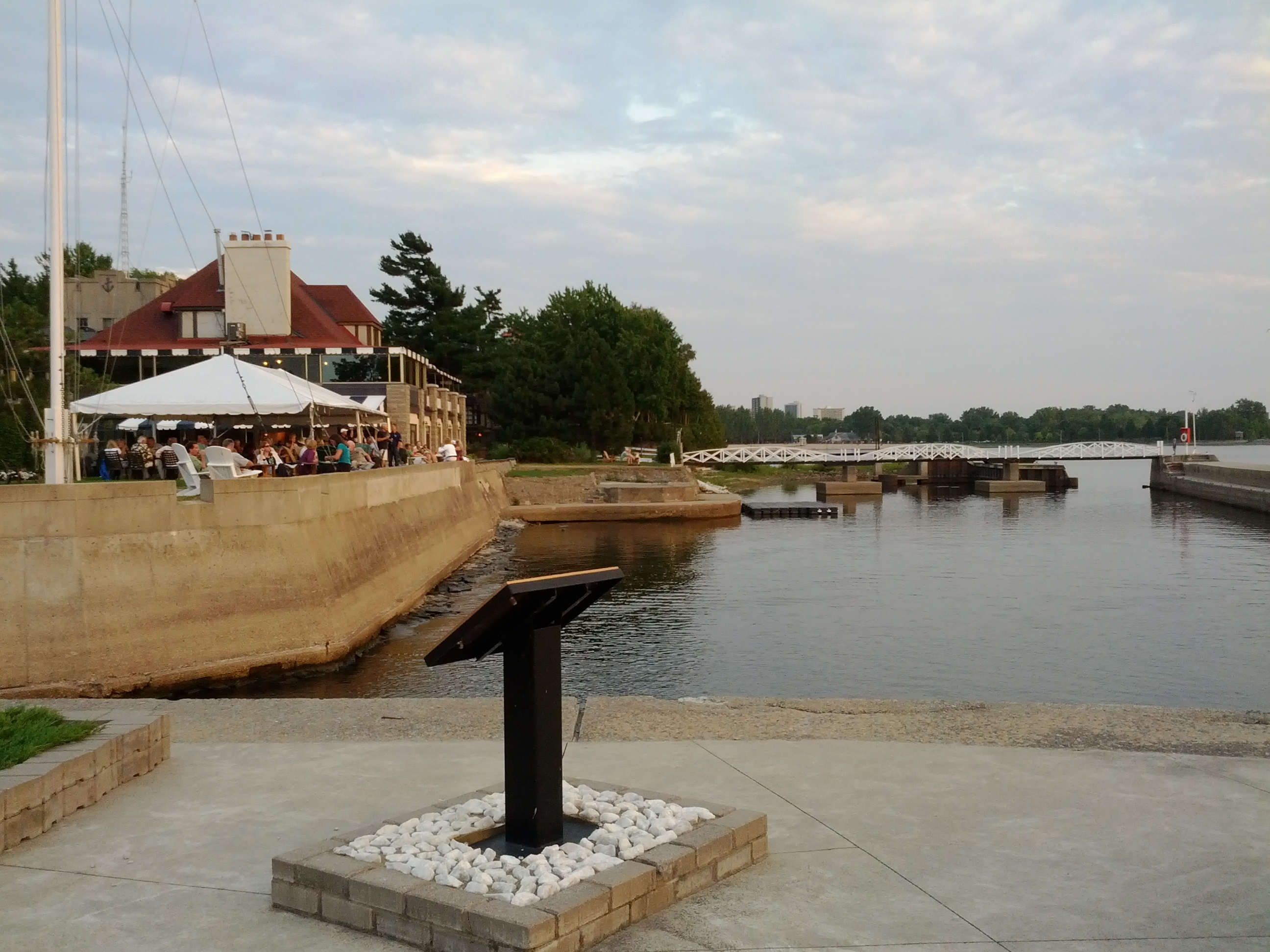
Britannia Yacht Club, established 1887 in Ottawa, Ontario

=== Boating and sailing ===
Lac Deschênes is used for recreational boating and sailing. It is home to five sailing clubs and one commercial marina. Britannia Yacht Club is the oldest, established in 1887. It is located at the eastern end of the lake near the Deschênes Rapids. Next is the Nepean Sailing Club established in 1979 but now the largest of the Ottawa area sailing clubs. It is located in Dick Bell Park on Carling Avenue in the former City of Nepean.

The Lac Deschênes Sailing Club and the Kanata Sailing Club are the two smaller clubs consisting primarily of dinghy fleets. On the Quebec side of the lake is the Club de Voile Grande-Rivière located at the Aylmer Marina.

Further upstream on the Ontario side is the Port of Call Marina. Numerous launch ramps exist on both sides of the lake. On the Ontario side, these are located at Fitzroy Harbour, Buckham's Bay, Port of Call Marina, Shirleys Bay, and the Nepean Sailing Club. A small public dock exists at Pinhey's Point while the village of Quyon maintains much larger public dock facilities near the western end of the lake.

Access between Ontario and Quebec across Lac Deschênes is provided by a ferry service between West Carleton and Quyon. Although a bridge has been proposed, it has not yet received approval.

Canadian Hydrographic Service Chart 1550 - Britannia Bay to Chats Falls covers the whole of Lac Deschênes. The Canadian Coast Guard maintains lights and buoys on the lake, however local emergency services in Ottawa and Gatineau are responsible for providing search and rescue services within their respective city boundaries. The nearest Coast Guard radio is in Prescott (VHF Ch. 16 or cellular telephone *16) however dialling 911 is the most effective means of reaching local emergency services.

Chart datum is 57.9 metres above sea level. Current water levels can be found on the Ottawa River Levels website. Water levels fluctuate on Lac Deschênes approximately 0.9 m annually, with the high on average of 58.8 m occurring during the spring freshet and the low on average of 57.9 m occurring during September. Water levels are affected strictly by the flows being passed from upstream. Waters are slow flowing except immediately below the dam at Chats Falls and again at Britannia Rapids. Although much of Lac Deschênes is relatively shallow, generally less than 9.0 m, there is a deep trough between Twelve Mile Island and Aylmer Island that reaches depths of 49 m.

=== Fishing ===
Numerous species of sport fish can be found in Lac Deschênes including black crappie, pickerel (walleye), muskie, and pike. Catfish abound in many of the bays.

=== Birds ===
Ring-billed, herring and great black-backed gulls are abundant as well as various other waterfowl species. Large numbers of Canada geese and other waterbirds stop at the lake during their fall migration. Mallards have been seen particularly in the Shirleys Bay area. Red-throated loons, Arctic terns, and common terns have also been spotted. Moderate numbers of shorebirds concentrate in the muddier parts of the shoreline such as at Shirleys Bay and Andrew Hayden Park. A colony of purple martins makes their home at the Nepean Sailing Club.

=== Possible pedestrian bridge ===
In August 2023, Jean-Pierre Caron, a resident of Aylmer, proposed the creation of a pedestrian bridge connecting Deschênes to Britannia. The bridge would be approximately 795 meters long and seven meters wide. The cost of a potential bridge would be in the range of $45 to $70 million. An online survey received over 1,000 responses within the first couple weeks. Hull-Aylmer MP Greg Fergus stated the federal government is not close to funding the project, while residents in Ottawa have expressed environmental and traffic concerns. The National Capital Commission (NCC) stated they would consider the bridge plan in their 2024 evaluation of the circulation and interprovincial travel needs of the region.
