= Belltown, Ottawa =

Belltown
- Neighbourhood
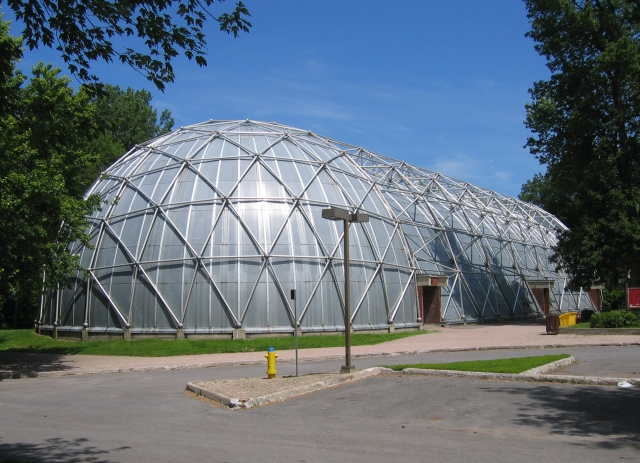
- Belltown Dome

- Location within Ottawa
- Coordinates: 45°21′38″N 75°48′08″W
- Country: Canada
- Province: Ontario
- City: Ottawa

Government
  - MPs: Anita Vandenbeld
  - MPPs: Chandra Pasma
  - Councillors: Theresa Kavanagh
  - Governing body: Belltown Neighbourhood Association
  - President: Alex Cullen

Area
  - Total: 0.777 km^{2} (0.300 sq mi)
- Elevation: 60 m (200 ft)

Population (2016)
  - Total: 2,089
  - Density: 2,690/km^{2} (6,960/sq mi)
- Canada 2016 Census
- Time zone: UTC-5 (Eastern (EST))

Belltown is a neighbourhood in the Britannia area of Bay Ward, in the west end of Ottawa. It is bounded on the east by Britannia Park, on the north by the Ottawa River, on the west by Andrew Haydon Park and the south by Carling Avenue. Prior to Ottawa's amalgamation in 2001, the neighbourhood spanned the Ottawa-Nepean municipal boundary. The neighbourhood's population is 2089 (2016 Census), with 294 people living in the Nepean portion.

== History ==
The neighbourhood began to be built in the early 1920s with additions in the late 1940s. It was part of Nepean Township until most of the area was annexed by Ottawa in 1950. In its early years, the neighbourhood was a "cottage community".

In 1963, the eastern part of the neighbourhood received sewers for the first time, replacing the use of septic tanks. At the same time, parts of the neighbourhood faced expropriation to make room for the proposed "Pinecrest-Deschenes Freeway" which was never built.

In 1968, the Britannia Woods housing development was completed in the neighbourhood for placement of families in to rent-to-income units. Britannia Woods is owned by Ottawa Community Housing. It was built by Catkey Construction and financed by the Ontario Housing Corporation.

In 1975, residents approved a grant of over $2 million as part of the Neighbourhood Improvement Program (NIP) to "rehabilitate and preserve" the neighbourhood. The NIP was a federal-provincial-municipal plan to improve and preserve old neighbourhoods and encourage development of the community's environment. The money mostly went toward storm sewer and road construction, and a multi-use recreation facility, plus street lighting, water-front development, playgrounds, tree planting and traffic light installation. The grant would pay for the Belltown Dome hockey arena, a geodesic dome-shaped building, which officially opened in 1979. In 1979, Nepean City Council approved a $250,000 for improvements in the Nepean section of the neighbourhood, for the creation of a park, an additional sewer and street upgrades.

One issue that continued to threaten the community's character was the proposed "Britannia Parkway", which would have run along the Ottawa River connecting the Kichi Zibi Mikan to the Queensway. The parkway was never built. Today, the neighbourhood is threatened by being within the Ottawa River's floodplain.

== Amenities ==
In addition to Britannia Park, which forms the neighbourhood's eastern border, and Andrew Haydon Park which forms the western border, Belltown also contains Grandeur Park. Municipal facilities include the Belltown Dome Arena, the Ron Kolbus Lakeside Centre and Briannia Trolley Park. The neighbourhood contains one school, Dr. F.J. McDonald Catholic. The Briannia Woods project includes a community garden.

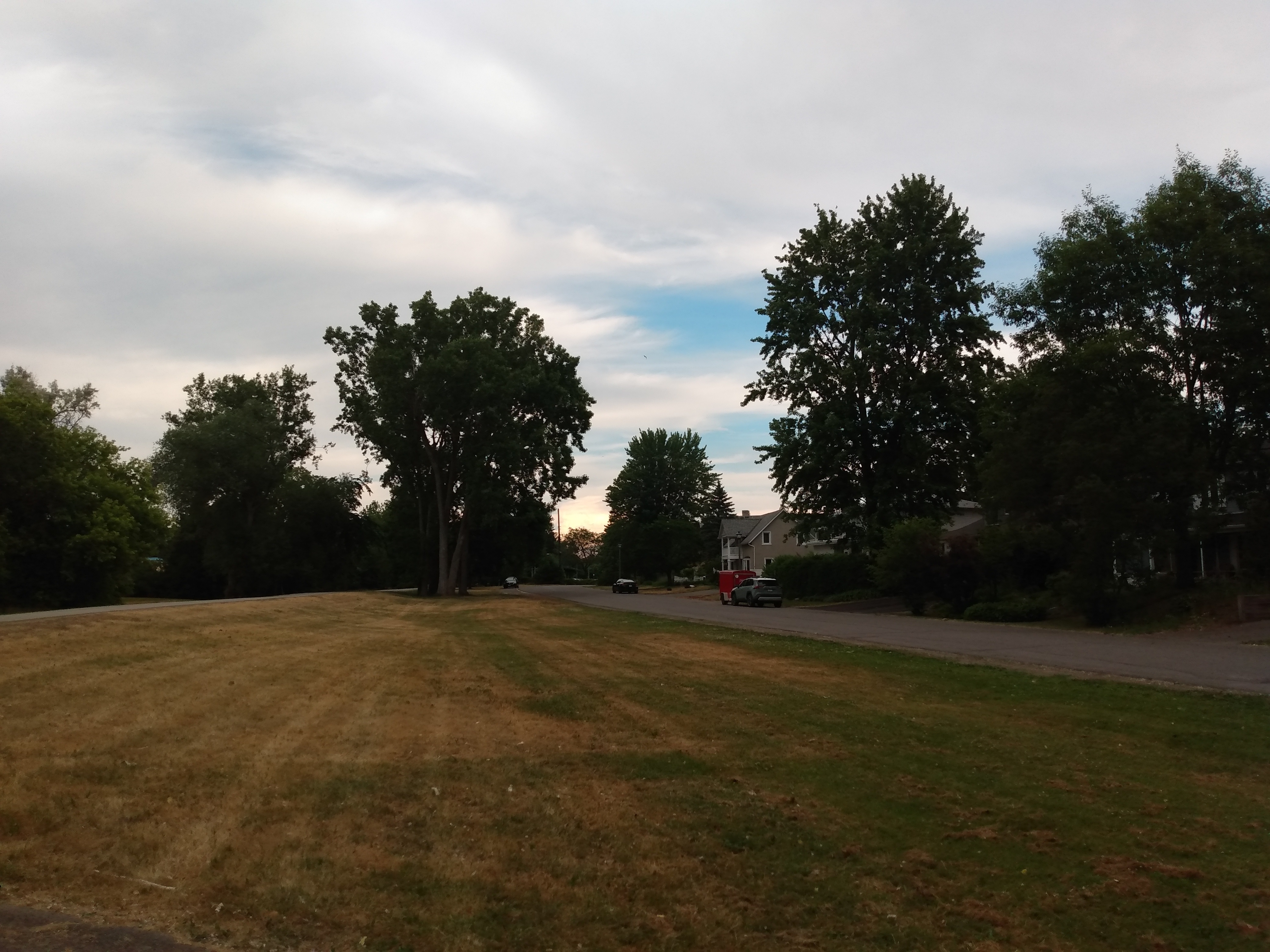
The Trans Canada Trail (left) and Grandeur Avenue (right) in Belltown
