= Brittania Beach =

Brittania Beach may refer to:

- Britannia Beach, British Columbia - a small west coast Canadian community
- Britannia, Ottawa - a westend suburban community of Ottawa, Ontario
