= Bell High School (Ottawa) =

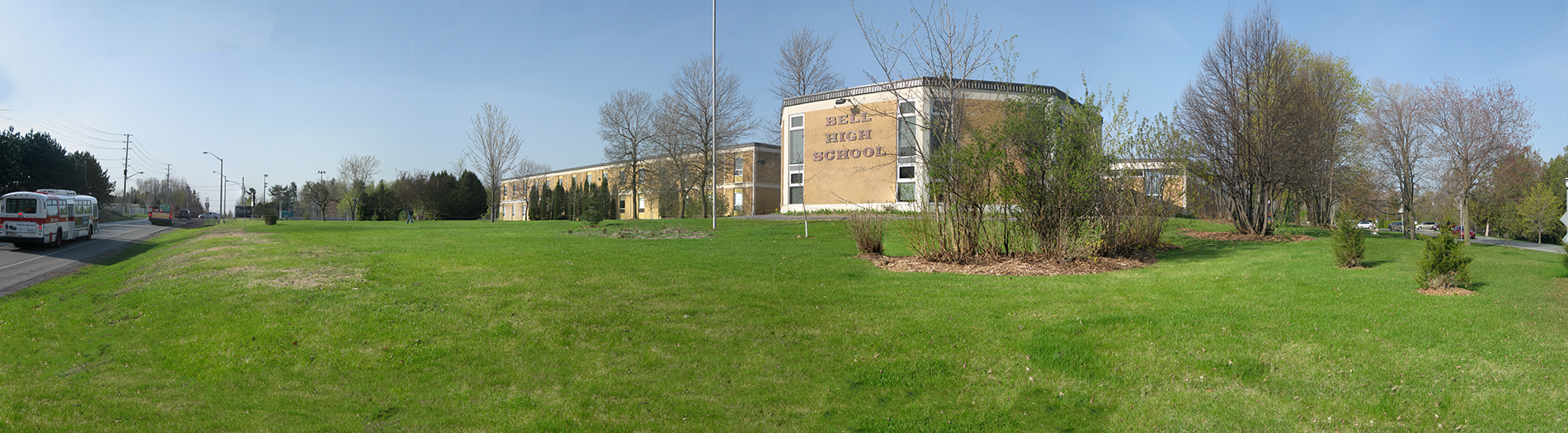

Location
- 40 Cassidy Road; Ottawa, Ontario, K2H 6K1; Canada; 45°19′33″N 75°48′35″W

Information
- Motto: Vitam Impendere Vero (Seek truth in life)
- Founded: 1962
- School board: Ottawa Carleton District School Board
- Principal: Jane Conrod
- Staff: ~90
- Grades: 7–12
- Enrollment: 707 (2022)
- Language: English, French
- Campus type: Suburban
- Colours: Red, black and white
- Team name: Bruins
- Newspaper: The Bell Roar
- Communities served: Bells Corners, Nepean, Bayshore, Crystal Beach, Kanata, Barrhaven
- Public transit access: OC Transpo: 88, 658, 660, 661, 665, 669, 675, 681
- Website: bellhs.ocdsb.ca

Bell High School is a high school located in the Bells Corners neighbourhood of Ottawa, Ontario, Canada.

The school was established by the Carleton Board of Education in 1962 as a public high school for grades 9–13. In 2018, Bell High School became a 7–12 school after the nearby D. Aubrey Moodie Intermediate School closed down.

== Facilities and infrastructure ==
Bell High School is located on a 10 hectare (25 acre) campus. The school building itself is in the shape of the letter "E" and divided into several wings. Each wing contains a different educational discipline, one each for science, mathematics, English, Technology and social studies. The school also has a cafeteria, a library, two music rooms, an art studio, a drama studio, a dance studio, a drafting studio, two full-sized gyms, a greenhouse, an automotive garage, two construction workshops, a soccer/football field with a 400-meter gravel track, and indoor weight training and exercise facilities. In 2021, the building was expanded to accommodate the newly-integrated intermediate students from the former D. A. Moodie Intermediate School. The school is adjacent to two baseball diamonds, a soccer/football field, an indoor ice rink (Bell Centennial Arena), and a forested section of the Greenbelt.

OC Transpo routes buses serving Bayshore, Crystal Beach, Kanata, and Barrhaven to the school.

== Student activities ==
Bell High School offers programs in gifted education, advanced placement, enrichment studies, student exchange, French immersion, and an ESL in addition to the normal academic program. Approximately 50% of the school's student population are transfers from other districts who attend Bell High School for these specialized programs.

Bell High School engages extensively in fundraising efforts. Through these efforts, Bell has contributed significantly to the local community and even managed to construct a sister school in Kenya which it maintains as an ongoing humanitarian project. Other than its fundraisers and humanitarian projects, Bell High School also hosts a plethora of events to actively promote arts and culture, though performances, banquets, and shows.

The school also has a large roster of sports teams which in many sports under the Bell Bruins name. The teams offered by Bell High School include: tennis, soccer, football, basketball, volleyball, badminton, field hockey, rugby, cross country running, Nordic skiing, Alpine skiing, Cricket, Hockey, Track and field, Curling, Baseball, Wrestling, and Swimming.

== Incidents ==
In spring 2016, two former Bell students separately filed complaints with the Ottawa Police Service that Tim Stanutz, their former music teacher had groomed and then sexual assaulted them. In May 2017, Stanutz died before trial. The two complainants filed civil lawsuits against the deceased's estate and the Ottawa-Carleton District School Board (OCDSB), each seeking $1.95 million in damages.

By 2018, the OCDSB was sued by victims and alleged victims of sexual abuse by three former teachers at the school, with the total amount of damages sought between all lawsuits being over $25 million. The lawsuits claimed that the OCDSB was negligent over the periods of historical abuse from the 1970s to the 2000s.

The OCDSB's defense in the Stanutz case denied that any students were groomed or abused, but that if they did occur, such activity was not authorized by the board.

In 2022, a disciplinary panel with the Ontario College of Teachers found a former Bell High School teacher, Peter Des Brisay, guilty of professional misconduct after sexually abusing a student in the late 1990s.

== Notable alumni ==
- John Baird, politician
- Gordon Fraser, cyclist
- Bruce Cockburn, musician
- Alison Korn, rower
- Hamza Haq, actor
- John Manley, politician
- Eliza Reid, writer
- Doug Smith, hockey player
- Sonja Smits, actress
- Tina Takahashi, judoka
- Phil Takahashi, judoka
- Ray Takahashi, judoka
- Teddy Wilson, TV personality
- Steve Yzerman, hockey player

== See also ==
- Education in Ontario
- List of secondary schools in Ontario
