= STV Fair Jeanne =

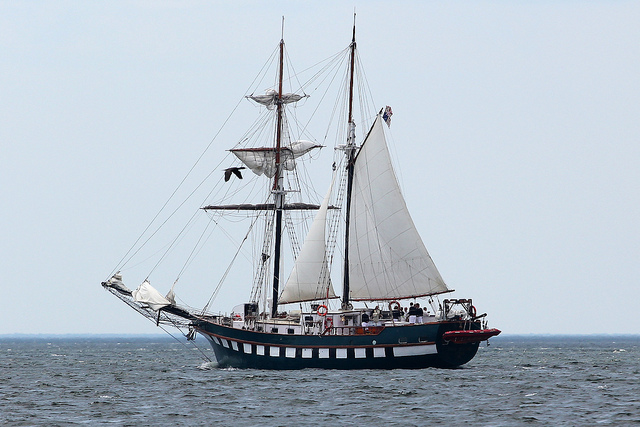
- Fair Jeanne

History

Canada
- Name: Fair Jeanne
- Builder: Capt. Thomas George Fuller
- Laid down: 1978
- Launched: 1980
- Identification: MMSI number: 913160255; Callsign: VA5303
- Status: In service
- Notes: Donated by Mrs. Jeanne Fuller to Bytown Brigantine for use in youth sail training programs on the Great Lakes and St. Lawrence Seaway.

General characteristics
- Type: Brigantine
- Tonnage: 138.36 GRT
- Length: 110 ft (34 m) (sparred length); 82 ft (25 m) (length on deck)
- Beam: 24.5 ft (7.5 m)
- Draft: 5.5 ft (1.7 m) or 12 ft (3.7 m) (with hydraulically operated drop keel down)
- Depth: 11.80 ft (3.60 m)
- Propulsion: GM671 - 140 hp (100 kW) diesel engine
- Sail plan: 4,500 sq ft (420 m^{2}), 10 sails in a brigantine rig
- Complement: Crew: 6, Trainees: 18–24
- Armament: Replica 4-pounder cannons for saluting.
- Notes: Fiberglass over steel frame construction.

STV Fair Jeanne is a Canadian sail training ship built and registered in Ottawa, Ontario. She is operated by the Ottawa-based youth charity, Bytown Brigantine Inc. Fair Jeanne is a 110 ft (34 m) traditionally-rigged brigantine of composite construction, outfitted with a Detroit Diesel auxiliary propulsion system. Fair Jeanne sails mostly on the Great Lakes, particularly Lake Ontario, and is berthed in Kingston, Ontario during the summer months.

While Fair Jeanne's summer port is Kingston, she was built by the Fuller family in the backyard of their Ottawa home. Fair Jeanne began life as the family's private yacht, cruising the world's oceans for more than ten years. Fair Jeanne is leased to the not-for-profit youth charity Bytown Brigantine, which uses her and her sister ship STV Black Jack for youth sail training. In addition to summer youth voyages, Fair Jeanne also does fall and spring group trips for organizations such as the Royal Canadian Sea Cadets, Girl Guides of Canada and corporate groups. Fair Jeanne also offers trips for people who are working towards The Duke of Edinburgh's Awards.

The length overall of the ship is 110 feet (34 m), length on deck 82 feet (25 m), and length at the waterline 72 feet (22 m). The beam width of the ship is 24.6 feet (7.5 m). The mast height is 80 feet (24 m) carrying approximately 4,500 square feet (420 m^{2}) of sail. Her hull is constructed of a steel frame with a thick fiber glass overlay. She draws 5.5 feet (1.7 m), or 12 feet (3.7 m) with the centreboard down, which allows her access to shallow docks.

== History ==
Fair Jeanne began her life in the backyard of the former Royal Canadian Navy officer Thomas G. Fuller. She was designed and built by Captain Fuller at his home in Britannia-on-the-Bay in Ottawa, Ontario. The keel was laid in 1978 and she was launched in 1980. Fair Jeanne was sailed by Capt. Fuller and his wife, Jeanne (now patron of Bytown Brigantine Inc.) in the Caribbean and to his old haunts in the European seas. During the past 15 years, the ship has logged over 150,000 miles (240,000 km) in service.

The Fuller family founded Bytown Brigantine Foundation in 1984 utilizing Fair Jeanne's sister ship, Black Jack, whose port is the Britannia Yacht Club. After 14 years of service to the family as a yacht, Fair Jeanne was brought into sail-training service as well, allowing Bytown Brigantine Inc. to expand its program and offer offshore sail training for youth between the ages of 15–18.

Fair Jeanne took part in the Tall Ships 1812 Tour, a pan-provincial event that traveled throughout Ontario during the summer of 2013, commemorating the bicentennial for the War of 1812. Sixteen ports participated in this event which was produced in partnership with the Tall Ships Challenge Great Lakes 2013 series. The first port of call for the tour was in Brockville, Ontario, Canada from June 14–16, 2013.

On the morning of July 26, 2013 Fair Jeanne was struck by a fishing tug while at anchor near Port Stanley, Ontario. The impact left a 30 by 30 cm (12 by 12 in) hole in the hull, approximately 1 m (3.3 ft) above the water line. She was repaired in Port Stanley.
