= 1882 in Canadian football =

The following is an overview of the events of 1882 in Canadian football, primarily focusing on the senior teams that played in this era. This includes news, playoff games, and championships.

In Quebec, the season of 1882 opened on May 13 with the Britannia Football Club and Montreal Football Club playing to a 0–0 tie.

On October 4, the Britannia Football Club and Royal Military College Foot-Ball Club scored a goal but it was another 1–1 tie and the Brits were undefeated. On October 21, they defeated their cross-town rivals, Montreal one goal to nil, and then defeated McGill two goals to nil to again capture the city championship.
