= Bell Centennial Arena =

Multi-purpose arena in Canada

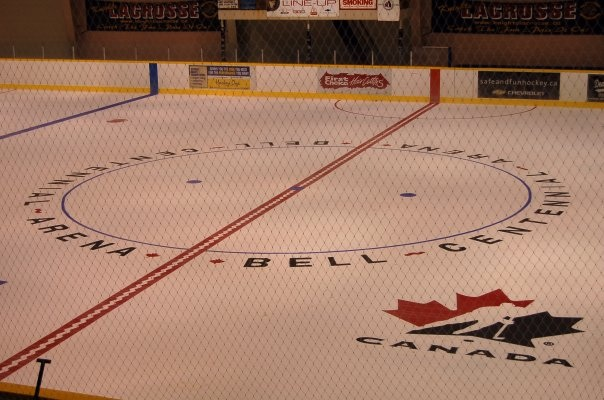
- Interactive map of Bell Centennial Arena
- Address: 50 Cassidy Drive
- Location: Ottawa, Ontario, Canada
- Coordinates: 45°19′30″N 75°48′39″W
- Owner: City of Ottawa
- Operator: City of Ottawa
- Capacity: 1000
- Surface: Multi-surface
- Field size: 24.384 metres (80.00 ft) x 57.912 metres (190.00 ft)

Construction
- Opened: October 9, 1965
- Renovated: 2010

Bell Centennial Arena, also known as Bell Arena for short, is a multi-purpose arena in Bells Corners in Nepean, Ottawa, Ontario, Canada that is located behind Bell High School at 50 Cassidy Drive former Cedarview Road before the new Veterans Memorial Highway (Ontario Highway 416) was built.

== History ==
On the Thanksgiving weekend of 1965, township officials opened the first two centennial projects in Canada; the Merivale and Bell Centennial Arenas. The first declared open was Merivale adjacent of Merivale High School on Merivale road, and in a ceremony held 30 minutes away, the Bell Centennial Arena was then officially opened. Both projects had a combined cost in excess of $584,000.

== Notable events ==
- 1968, October 9 – Ottawa M and W Rangers expansion franchise of the Central Junior A Hockey League begin their training camp for their inaugural season which will be held at the Bell Centennial Arena.
- 1968, December 28 – First International Tournament In High School Hockey (eight teams participate, four from Ottawa, one from North Bay, Ontario and three from the United States)
