= Nepean Sailing Club =

Marina and sailing club in Ottawa, Ontario

Coordinates: 45.353936°N 75.824078°W

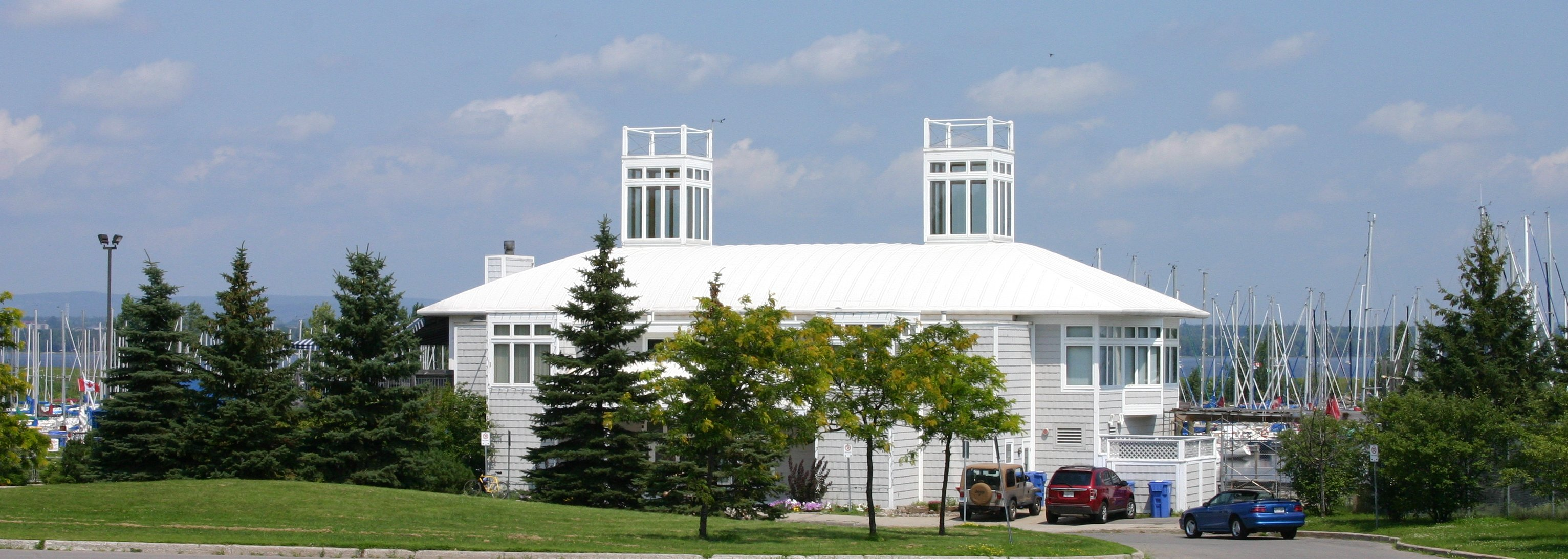
- Nepean Sailing Club Clubhouse in Ottawa, Ontario
- Abbreviation: NSC
- Formation: 1979
- Legal status: active
- Purpose: advocate and public voice, educator and network for recreational and competitive sailors, coaches, volunteers and events
- Location(s): 3259 Carling Avenue Ottawa, Ontario K2H 1A6
- Official language: English, French
- Affiliations: Canadian Canoe Association, Advantage Boating; Britannia Yacht Club.
- Website: www.nsc.ca

The Nepean Sailing Club (NSC) is a sailing club located on Lac Deschênes in Ottawa, Ontario, Canada. The club is based in Dick Bell Park, along Carling Avenue, adjacent to Andrew Haydon Park in the former city of Nepean.

== History ==
The club was officially opened on July 29, 1979, with an initial membership of 350. Construction on the original 300 metre breakwater was completed by 1983. Griffiths Rankin Cook Architects won an architectural award in 1990 for the design of the main clubhouse.

== Features ==
The main areas include hand and vehicle launch ramps; green and blue gazebos; Clubhouse, Registration, Office and Washrooms; youth sailing pavilion, first aid, washrooms, changing facility; wheelchair pathway; parking and dock access.

== Life at the Club ==
=== Enrolment ===
Membership today is almost 1900 members. The club maintains its emphasis on sailing. The club has floating dock facilities for over 500 boats. The club also maintains an active dry sail program for day-sailing.

=== Programs ===
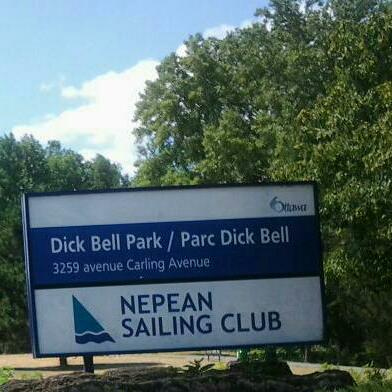
Nepean Sailing Club Dick Bell Park Sign

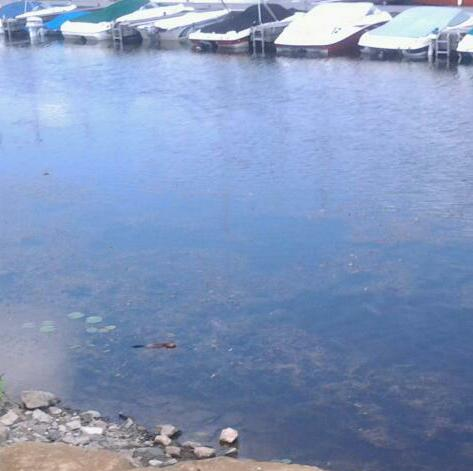
Nepean Sailing Club beaver and boats in harbour

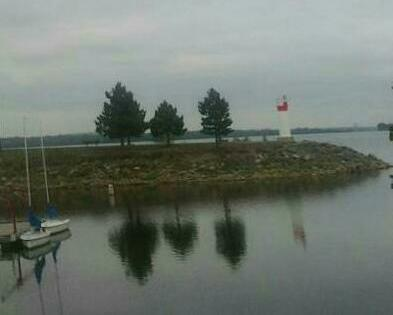
Nepean Sailing Club lighthouse and Martin 16 sailboats

The sailing season extends from mid-April to late October. Sail training programs are active during the summer months for both youth and adults.

Every year the club hosts sailing regattas that attract sailors from across Canada and internationally. The local racing scene consists of fleet, PY and PHRF races on an almost daily basis along with special racing events on weekends throughout the season. Many racing events are held in cooperation with the nearby Britannia Yacht Club (BYC) and Club de Voile Grande-Rivière (CVGR).

Mondays typically see the women's racing. Tuesdays are PHRF. Wednesdays see 5o5s, Lasers racing one design, catamarans, and Albacores and Fireballs combining for handicap racing. Thursdays see C&C27s, Tanzer 22s, and Sharks race one design, J24s and Kirby 25s racing level, with three fleets of JAM (jib and main) racing PHRF. A distance race or regatta can be observed almost every weekend.

The Nepean Sailing Club also maintains an active Able Sail program with a fleet of Martin 16 boats, wheel-chair access, and an active team of volunteers who escort the boats.

A number of trophies and awards are presented for evening and series events in addition to the trophies listed in Special events. The aggregate trophies awarded on basis of points earned in evening and weekend events include the Nautilus Trophy, Journal Trophy, Kelpie Cup, C&C 27 Overall Champion, and Jam Dish. Interclub awards are scored for series racing: The Chandlery Cup, Kirby 25 Best Performance Trophy, Authentic Yachts Trophy, NSC Beagle Bown, and Keepers.

=== Evening Series Calendar ===
Mondays typically see the women's PHRF racing and the skiffs and Lasers racing. Tuesdays are PHRF keelboats. Wednesdays see 5o5s, Lasers racing one design, catamarans, and Albacores and Fireballs combining for handicap racing. Thursdays see C&C27s, Tanzer 22s, Sharks, Mirage 24s race one design with three fleets of jib and main (JAM) racing PHRF. NSC has a racing program involving both (PHRF and JAM fleets). NSC fields teams to compete against other clubs in team racing. BYC has a regular weekday evening racing schedule and a weekend racing schedule organized by the membership. Members of the NSC High Performance Team have the opportunity to learn what it is like to compete against the best in the world, and the experience they gain at races and regattas will certainly help them as they progress in their sailing careers.

Day	Description	Series	Awards
Mondays	Women's PHRF (skippered & crewed by women)	Series I (8 Races) & II (8 Races)	The Chandlery Cup, keepers
Tuesdays	PHRF Keelboats	Spring Series (7 race nights), Summer Series (7 race nights), Fall series (7 race nights)	Keepers, Sugar Bowl, J.G. Hickson Memorial, B Fleet Trophy,
Wednesdays	BYC One-design Dinghy and Sailboard	Spring Series (7 race nights), Summer Series (7 race nights), Fall series (7 race nights)	The Don Martin Trophy, Nautilus Trophy, Keepers
Wednesdays	NSC One-Design Dinghy, Catamaran, Handicap Dinghy	Spring Series (7 race nights), Summer Series (7 race nights), Fall series (7 race nights)	Keepers
Thursdays	One-design Keelboats	Spring Series (7 race nights), Summer Series (7 race nights), Fall series (7 race nights)	Keepers
Thursdays	PHRF JAM Fleets	Spring Series (7 race nights), Summer Series (7 race nights), Fall series (7 race nights)	Spring/Summer Series Trophy, Sugar Bowl, Shark Aggregate Trophy, Yuile Around the Buoys, Keepers
Sundays	Frostbite Series - PHRF Keelboat & PFRF Keelboat & PHRF JAM & Skiffs	October (6 races, 2 per day)	Keepers

=== Weekend and Special Events ===
A distance race or regatta can be observed almost every weekend. Some events are open to any member of a club of the Canadian Yachting Association. Some events are interclub, which means that boats from all sailing clubs on Lac Deschênes may participate. Many racing events are held in cooperation with the nearby Britannia Yacht Club and Club de voile Grande-Rivière. BYC & NSC have a schedule of cruising and day sailing events organized by the membership for fun, as memorials for members who serve in the Canadian Forces, and as fundraisers for local charities.

Month	Event	Host	Awards
May	Singlehanded Regatta - PRF & Sharks	BYC	The Great BYC Challenge Cup & Ragtime Trophy
May	Shorey Race	BYC	Constance Shorey Memorial Trophy, Corinthian Trophy, Marina Trophy, Victoria Trophy, Keepers
May	Spring 50 Mile Race	BYC	Artemis Trophy, Blue-Bell Trophy, Keepers
June	Commodore's Sailpast	BYC/NSC	N/A
June	Pinhey's Point Race -ILD Race	BYC	BYC Fleet Trophy, Edwin L. Brittain Trophy, Vice Commodore's Trophy, L.S. Sherwood Tray, Forrest Tray, Evening Citizen Trophy, Director's Trophy, Keepers
June	MacGregor Venture Rendezvous (fun)	NSC	N/A
June	Jefferson Pursuit Race	BYC	pursuit race where the slowest boats start before the fastests boats
June	NSC One-Design Regatta, Capital City Sharp Regatta	NSC	Keepers
July	Canada Day Cup & Saucer Race (fun)	BYC	N/A
July	Hinterhoeller Regatta	BYC	Hinterhoeller Trophy
July	Pinhey's Point Race -ILD Race	NSC	Nautilus Trophy, Keepers
July	Up-river Sail & Raft-up	NSC	N/A
July	Quyon Race	BYC	Quyon Cup, Eun Na Mara, Oldest Boat, Quyon Open, W.L. Donnelly Memorial Trophy, Shark Trophy, B.B.C. Trophy, Quyon Trophy
July	Homeward Bound Race	BYC	Homeward Bound Trophy, The Tony Lawson Trophy, Keepers
July	BYC Cruise Week	BYC	N/A
July	National Capital Cup (Martins)	NSC	restricted to sailors with disabilities
July	Easter Seal Regatta (fun)	BYC/NSC	charity regatta to raise funds for Easter Seals (Canada) Easter Seals Society of Ottawa-Carleton
July	Don Hewett Memorial Regatta (juniors)	BYC	Don Hewitt Memorial Trophy
July	Joint Mohr Island Race - ILD Race	BYC	Craig Trophy, Negark Handicap Trophy, Shark Trophy, Thunderbird Trophy, Cook Trophy, Keepers, Scott's Restaurant Co Trophy, Lone Ranger Cup, MacDonald Plaque, Keepers
July	Ian Meller Memorial Regatta	BYC	The Ian Meller Memorial Trophy
July	Baskin's Odd Couple Race	BYC	Brule Bucket, Corrected Time Trophy, Karisa Trophy, Aston Jug
August	Baskin's Weekend & Baskin's Beach BBQ	BYC	N/A
August	Stan Carsons Memorial C&C Regatta	BYC	Special instructions issued
August	O'Pen Bic UNregatta	NSC	For junior racers.
August	National Capital Regatta	BYC	Reid & Pattee Trophy, Caveat Cup, Molson Award, Skene Trophy, The Bucket, Carl Strike Memorial Trophy, Yuile Award, BYC Y-Flyer NCR Trophy, Keepers
August	Joint Stony Point Race- ILD Race	NSC	Evans and Kert Trophy, Shark Trophy, SK Trophy, Keepers
August	Midnight Madness (fun)	NSC	After Hours Bowl, Keepers
August	NSC Harbourmaster's Race/BBQ (Fun)	NSC	Harbour Master's Bowl, Keepers
September	Armitage Race / Baskin's Weekend/Cornboil	BYC	Lt. Col C.E. Long Trophy, Hanseat Trophy, M. Norman Trophy, Calypso Bucket, Keepers
September	100 Mile Race	BYC	Firecracker Cup, Stage 1 trophy, Keepers
September	BYC Sailboard Open Regatta	BYC	Keepers
September	Fanfare Regatta - 505 Fleet 4 Regatta	NSC	505 Fleet 4 Trophy, Keepers
September	Single-handed Keelboat Race	NSC	Whippet Cup, Ottobahn Trophy, Keepers
September	Queen's Park Race -ILD Race	BYC	D.P. Wadell Trophy, Pritchard & Andrews Co. Trophy, Queen's Park Trophy, Shark Trophy, T. Appleton Trophy, Queen's Park Race Trophy, Keepers
September	Fall 50 Mile Race	BYC	Miss Peggy Trophy, Robin Hood Trophy, The Rhodes Cup, The Joan W Woods Memorial, Keepers
September	Nepean Cup Match Race	NSC	Special instructions will be issued
October	20 Mile Trophy Race -ILD Race	NSC	Brule Bowl, Keepers
October	BYC Club Championships	BYC	
October	Turkey Trot (fun)	NSC	Leon's TV Trophy, Keepers
October	Frostbite Race (fun)	BYC	Molson Frostbite Trophy
November	Remembrance Day Regatta (fun)	BYC	Remembrance Day Regatta Trophy

=== The Galley ===
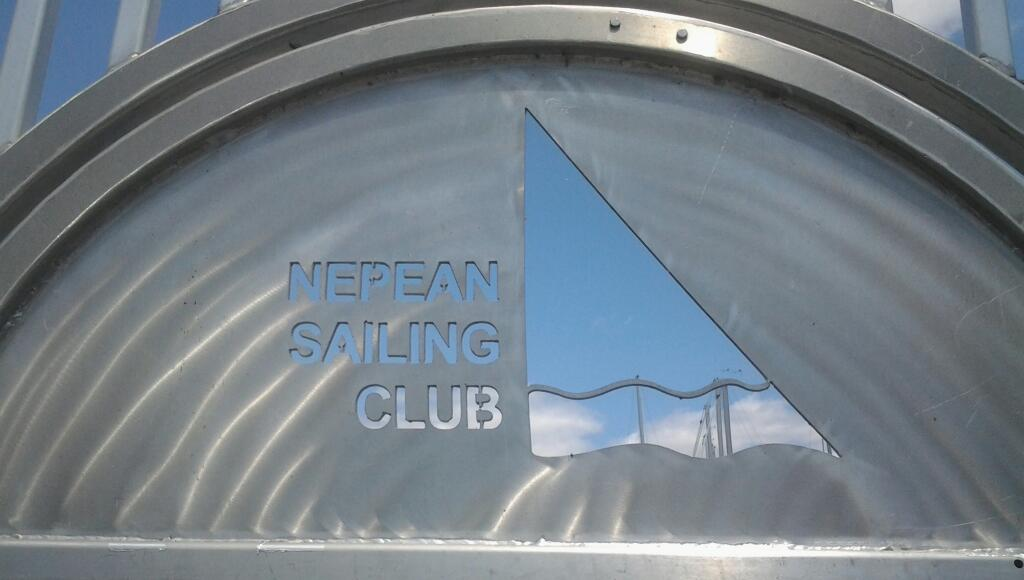
Nepean Sailing Club metal sign

Nepean Sailing Club also features a restaurant named "The Galley". It is open to the public, and features a patio overlooking the harbour. The Galley can be found on the upper floor of the clubhouse, and has a large room that can be rented for events.

== Wildlife ==
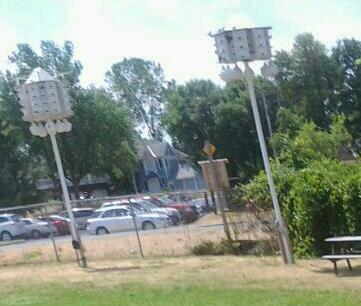
Nepean Sailing Club purple martin houses

For birdwatchers, species in or passing through the area include Arctic tern, black tern, New World blackbirds, black brant, Canada geese, common goldeneye, common merganser, common tern, double-crested cormorants, great blue heron, green-winged teal, gulls, killdeer, northern pintails, rails, red-throated loon, ring-billed gull, songbirds, spotted sandpiper, swallows, loggerhead shrike, least bittern, and wood ducks. The fish species in the Ottawa River near BYC include brown trout, small mouth bass and walleye. The reptiles, amphibians, and salamanders include American eels, American ginseng, American bullfrog, green frog, mudpuppy, painted turtles, snapping turtles, spotted turtle, and spring peeper. The mammals in the area include beaver, coyotes, eastern chipmunks, mink, muskrat, otter, porcupine, raccoons, red foxes, red squirrels, and woodchucks.

== Partnerships ==
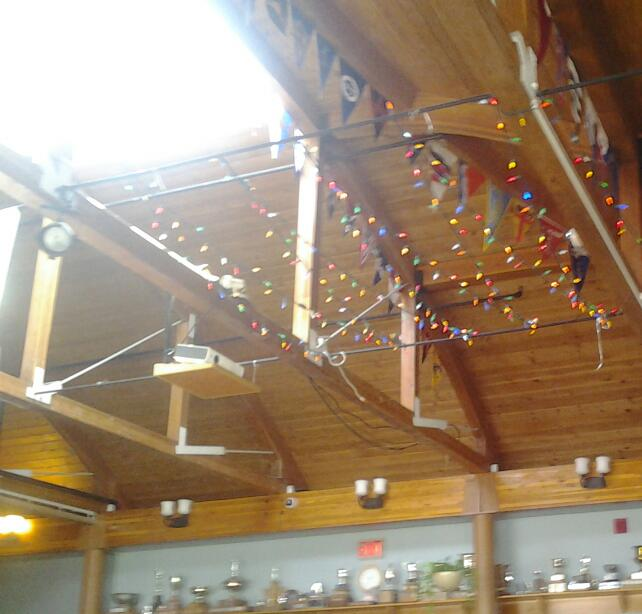
Nepean Sailing Club main lounge roof trophies and burgees

As a Provincial Training Centre for 2012, NSC supports the training of Athletes at the Olympic level. As a Development Training Centre for 2012, NSC supports the training of Athletes from the Grassroots to the National Team Level and supports the development of Coaches from Level 1 (CANSail 1&2) to Level 4–5.

The Britannia Yacht Club is developing a joint marketing campaign with the Nepean Sailing Club to increase awareness of recreational and competitive sailing in Ottawa.

Through Advantage Boating, there are adult and children's Learn to Sail Programs.
