= Thomas G. Fuller =

Canadian Navy officer (1908–1994)

Thomas George Fuller
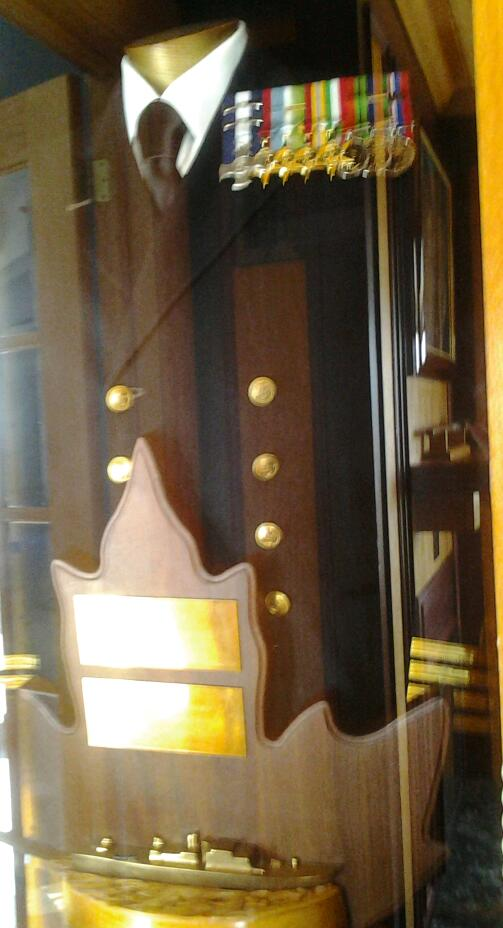
- Thomas G Fuller display case and trophy, Britannia Yacht Club, Commodore's Boardroom
- Born: December 13, 1908; Ottawa, Ontario
- Died: May 9, 1994 (aged 85); Ottawa, Ontario
- Relatives: Thomas Fuller – grandfather Thomas W. Fuller – father William, Mark, Antony and Simon – sons
- Military career
- Allegiance: Canada
- Branch: (Canada) Royal Canadian Naval Volunteer Reserve
- Service years: 1939–1951
- Rank: Captain
- Nickname: Pirate of the Adriatic
- Commands: 61st MGB flotilla; HMCS Naden; HMCS Carleton
- Conflicts: World War II: English Channel and North Sea; Battle of the Mediterranean; Adriatic Campaign

Thomas George Fuller DSC (1908–1994) was a Canadian captain of the Royal Canadian Naval Volunteer Reserve who earned renown in the Second World War for his actions as a member of the Coastal Forces of the Royal Navy in European waters. Born in Ottawa, Fuller joined the Royal Canadian Naval Volunteer Reserve in 1939 and was seconded to the British Royal Navy. During his service with the Royal Navy he commanded motor torpedo boat flotillas in European waters, serving with distinction in the Adriatic Sea where he earned a Distinguished Service Cross and two bars along with the nickname "Pirate of the Adriatic." Following the war, Fuller commanded two Canadian Naval Reserve Divisions before retiring in 1952. Following his military service, Fuller ran Thomas Fuller Construction which was instrumental in the construction of several landmark buildings in Ottawa. He was also a member of Ottawa's Britannia Yacht Club and converted and built two brigantines that would later be used for sail training. Fuller died in Ottawa at the age of 85.

== Early life and naval service ==
Born in Ottawa, he was a 32-year-old contractor when he joined the Royal Canadian Naval Volunteer Reserve in 1939. He was seconded to the British Royal Navy where he commanded flotillas of motor torpedo boats in the Mediterranean Sea and the Adriatic Sea.

He was awarded the Distinguished Service Cross (DSC) for an action off Dover on 12 May 1942 before being transferred to Alexandria and HMS Mosquito in 1943. While there he won a bar to his DSC for actions in the Aegean Sea.

In 1944 he took command of the 61st MGB flotilla, eight torpedo gunboats, based on Vis Island, Yugoslavia. It was here, while conducting raids on Axis shipping to provide supplies to Josip Broz Tito's partisans, that he earned a second bar to his DSC and a Mention in Despatches, as well as the nickname "The Pirate of the Adriatic." He earned the nickname because he carried commandos and captured dozens of ships intact seizing useful cargo such as tons of goulash and Danish butter. For example, he sank or captured 25 ships in ten days. He had 105 firefights at sea as well as 30 actions in which he did not fire a shot. Nevertheless, he decommissioned 13 boats during his war service; the ships were no longer serviceable and were stripped for parts.

After being imprisoned in Greece, he escaped in a German Admiral's Barge.

After the war he commanded HMCS Naden and HMCS Carleton before retiring in 1952.

== Post-war career ==
Fuller ran Thomas Fuller Construction, which built the Ottawa Police Service headquarters, Ottawa General Hospital, Ottawa Congress Centre, the Varette Building (1982) on Albert Street, and Standard Life's twin towers on Laurier Avenue. He was still working in the family business when he died at 85 years of age.

Thomas Fuller converted a former tugboat into a brigantine, STV Black Jack. In the 1980s, he designed and built a brigantine, STV Fair Jeanne, which was named in honour of his wife. After launching Fair Jeanne in 1982, he and his wife cruised around the world six and a half times. Today, the ships are flagships of the Bytown Brigantine sail training program. He died at 85 years of age at the Ottawa Civic Hospital on May 9, 1994.

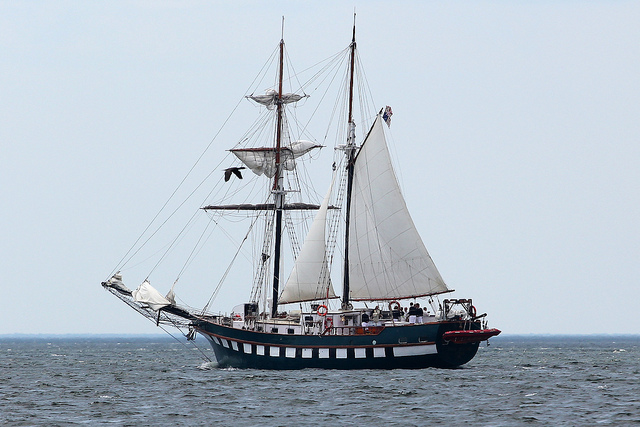
STV Fair Jeanne

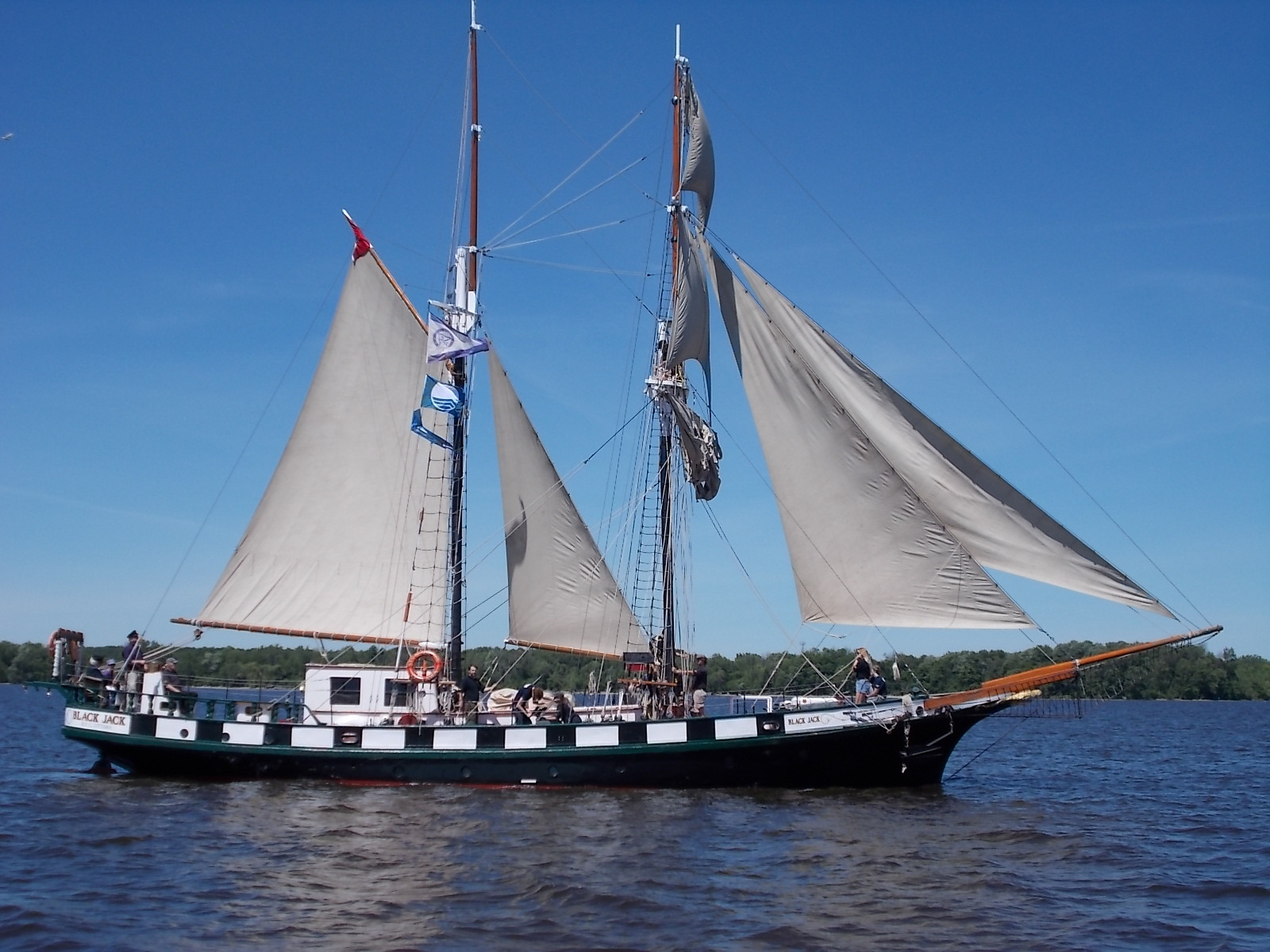
STV Black Jack

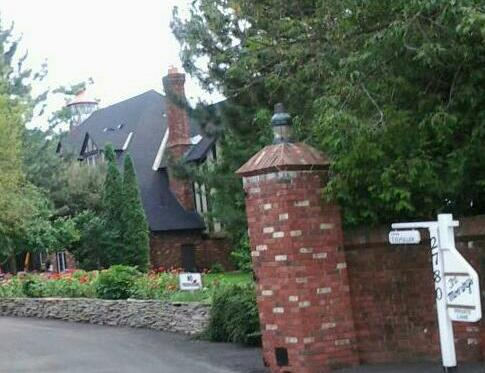
The Moorings, Fuller home, Britannia, Ottawa

== Family ==
Thomas and his second wife Jeanne had four sons plus a daughter who died in infancy. Their estate was the Moorings across the street from the Britannia Yacht Club. He turned over Thomas Fuller and Son Heavy Equipment to their son Simon, when he was 23 years old. Their son Bill serves as vice president of the Fuller family construction company and Antony is President of the Fuller real estate arm, Metcalfe Realty Company Limited. His daughter from his first marriage to Penelope Sherwood, Victoria Fuller, is a former British actress now living in Ottawa and his eldest son Tom, a retired teacher, lives in New Zealand.

== Legacy ==
Thomas G. Fuller's sons, William, Mark, Antony and Simon are active in the Fuller Group of Companies, whose projects include: Rideau Place Retirement Home; Shoppers Drug Mart; The Glebe Centre; City Centre Self Storage Facility; Carleton University Master Plan Phase 1; St. Lawrence College, Ontario, Student Residence; Alfred Lefaivre Water Treatment Plant; Renfrew Water Treatment Plant; The Library of Parliament heritage restoration; Civic Hospital Heart Research and an office building on 90 Murray St.

The Thomas G Fuller Trophy is awarded annually to the Canadian Forces Naval Reserve achieving the topmost state of combat readiness. Captain Thomas G Fuller served as Commodore to the Britannia Boating Club, Ottawa, Ontario 1948–49. The Fuller Trophy, his uniform and his sword are in a display cabinet in the Commodore's Boardroom at the Britannia Yacht Club. In 1969, a brass plaque on the harbour at Britannia Yacht Club commemorated All the walls in this harbour were built by the physical efforts of the club members started 1 nov 1951 length 1 mile completed 19 October 1968. This stone laid by Captain Thomas G. Fuller.

The Commodore's boardroom table features a ship's wheel from G.B. Patee II (1904), a steam tug acquired as a family brigantine in 1952 by Captain Thomas Fuller. The Britannia Yacht Club has used the tug, rigged as a pirate ship known as Black Jack since 1983 to train new recruits to sail through the Bytown Brigantine Inc.

The Canadian War Museum erected a memorial passageway plaque in his honour: "The name of this passageway honours the late Captain Thomas G. Fuller, D.S.C.**, M.I.D., R.C.N.V.R., whose operational exploits on loan to the Royal navy during the Second World War, serving in and commanding flotillas of Motor Torpedo Boats and Gun Boats, earned him great distinction as "The Pirate of the Adriatic". His "Nelson-like" tactics of thwarting, sinking, boarding and capturing enemy shipping revolutionized coastal forces small boat warfare, insufficiently recognized as R.C.N.V.R. operations that deserve a better place in Canadian military history. Acknowledged by Marshal Tito as an "Hon. Commandant National Army of Liberation" for his strategic support of the Partisans in liberation of Yugoslavia, Thomas George Fuller is fondly remembered as a genuine Canadian hero, a wonderful husband and father, "master builder" and philanthropist.

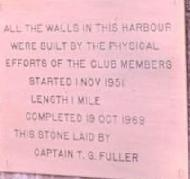
Brass plaque Building Harbour, Britannia Yacht Club 1 Nov 1951–19 Oct 1969 stone laid by Captain Thomas G. Fuller

== See also ==
- Adriatic Campaign of World War II
