= STV Black Jack =

1904 Canadian brigantine sailing ship

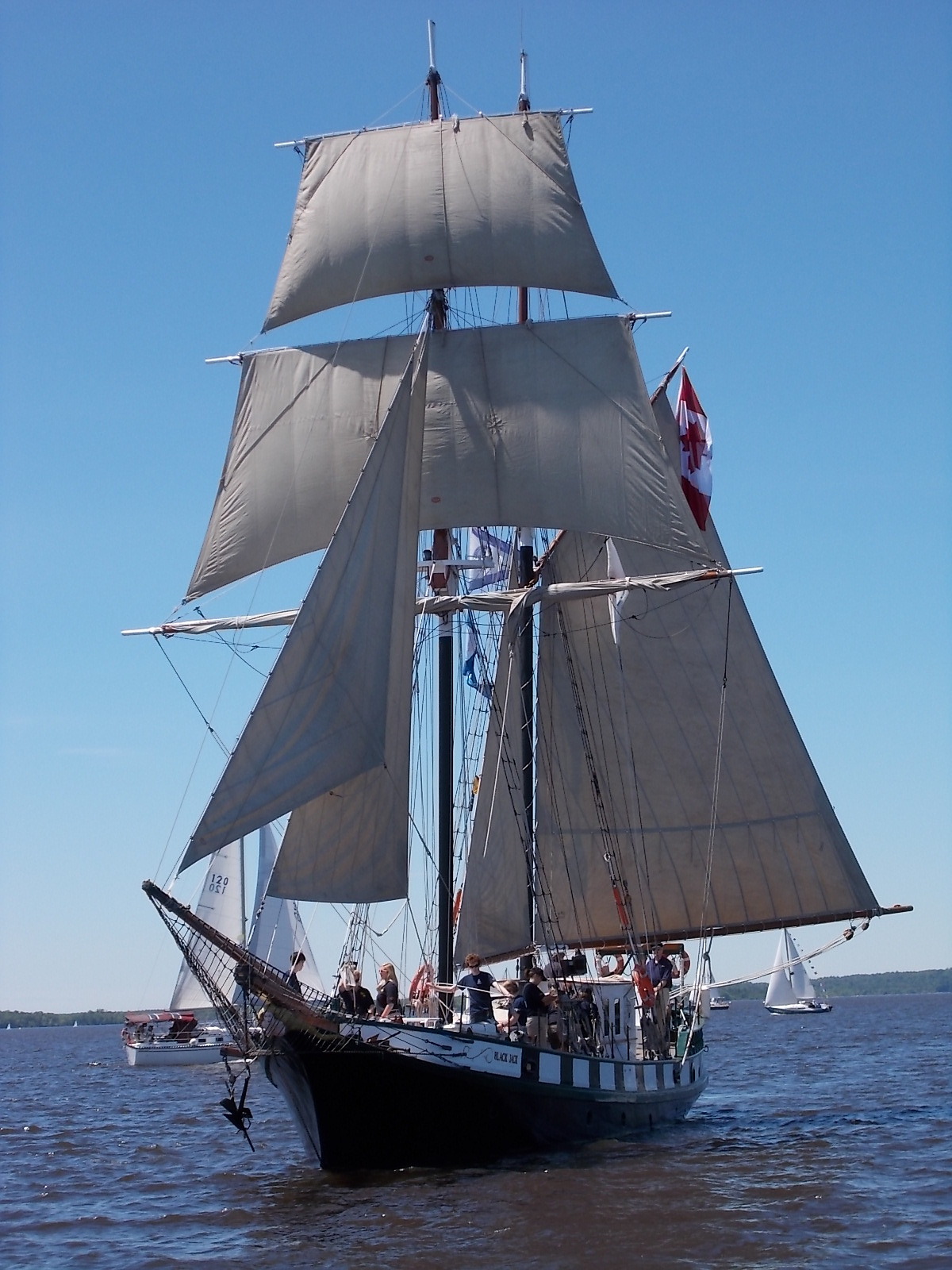
- Black Jack on the Britannia Yacht Club's Commodore's Sail Past 2014

History

Canada
- Name: G.B. Pattee II
- Launched: May 2, 1904
- Acquired: the Upper Ottawa Improvement Company
- Fate: Driven ashore and abandoned after World War II

Canada
- Builder: Thomas G. Fuller, Ottowa
- Recommissioned: May 2, 2004
- Renamed: Black Jack
- Status: In service
- Notes: Hulk rescued in the 1950s. Converted into a brigantine rig as a family yacht. Later donated to Bytown Brigantine

General characteristics
- Type: Brigantine
- Length: 87 ft (27 m) (spared length); 62 ft (19 m) (length on deck)
- Beam: 14 ft (4.3 m)
- Draught: 6 ft (1.8 m)
- Propulsion: GM671 diesel engine
- Sail plan: 3,000 ft^{2} (280 m^{2}) 9 sails in a brigantine rig
- Complement: Crew: 5, Trainees: 12–15.
- Armament: 10 gauge saluting cannon.
- Notes: 5 kW generator

STV Black Jack is a brigantine operated by the Ottawa-based youth charity Bytown Brigantine, Inc. Black Jack sails on the Ottawa River between Brittania Yacht Club and Quyon, Quebec. On May 2, 2004, Black Jack was designated "Ottawa's Signature Tall Ship".

Black Jack was the first ship in service with Bytown Brigantine, Inc., a charitable organization devoted to providing sail training adventure for youth. This 87-foot (27 m) brigantine is home to 15 youth between the ages of 12 and 15 during the summer months. The program is designed to develop character and foster leadership, confidence and self-reliance in youth through the medium of sail training. Her sister ship, STV Fair Jeanne, is also in use by Bytown Brigantine on the Great Lakes and Canada's east coast.

Black Jack is steel-hulled with wooden bilge keels. Her sparred length is 87 feet (27 m), length on deck 62 feet (19 m), and beam 14 feet (4.3 m). She draws 6 feet (1.8 m), which allows her to go almost anywhere a keelboat can, which is very useful when maneuvering the Ottawa River and docking at her berth in Britannia Yacht Club. She can be seen at the yacht club but is not open to the public except on special occasions. Her mast height is 80 feet (24 m) and she carries a total of 3,000 square feet (280 m^{2}) of sail area on nine sails.

== History ==
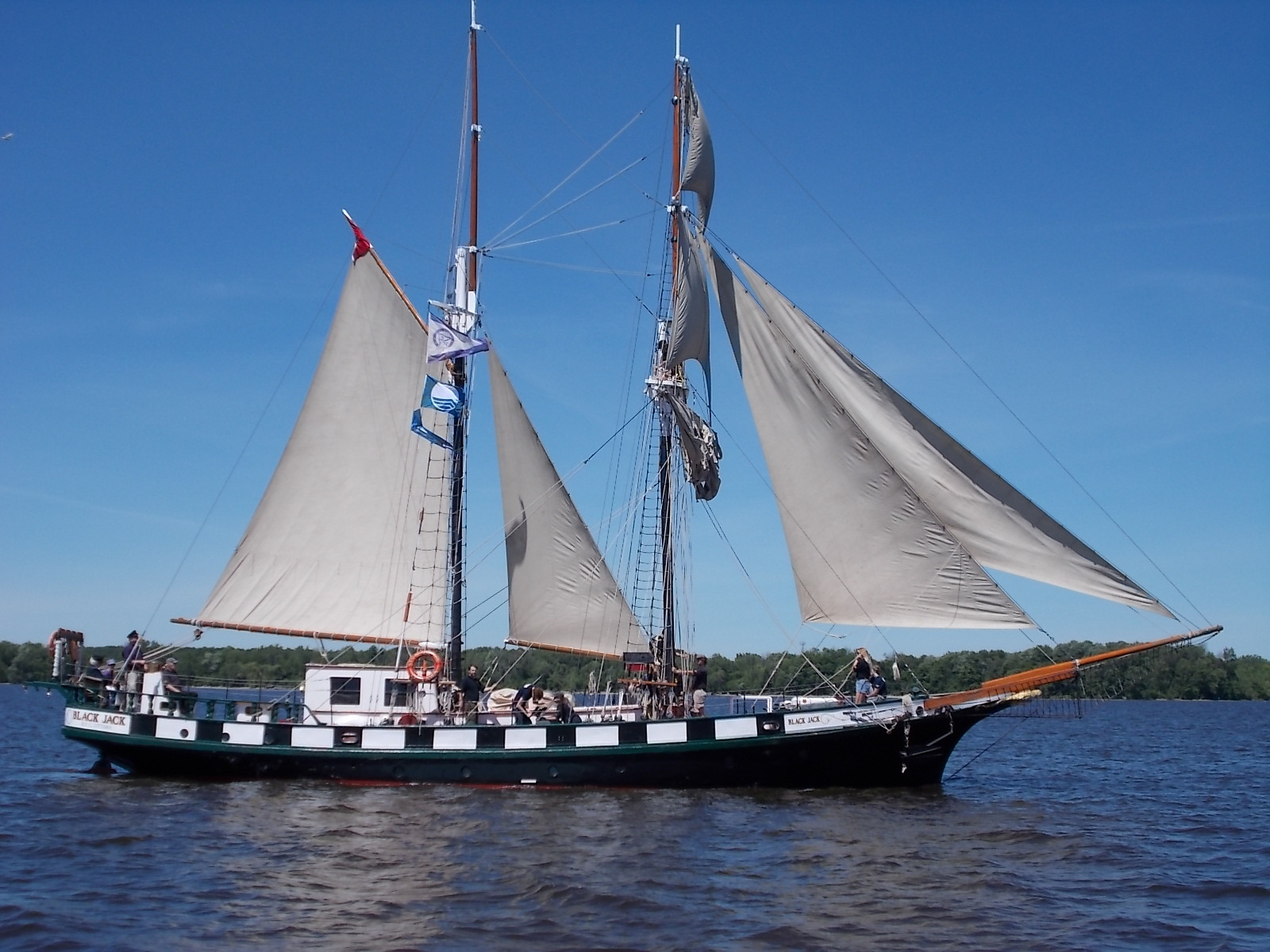
Black Jack

Black Jack was originally a logging tug on the Upper Ottawa River and was based in Quyon, Quebec. She was built in Scotland in 1904 and made her way to Canada that same year. In 1952, the ship was converted by the late Captain Thomas G. Fuller into a brigantine. She operated as the Fuller family yacht for several years until her sister ship STV Fair Jeanne was built in 1982. Rather than see the ship fall into disuse, Captain Fuller's son, Simon Fuller, refitted the ship with the intention of using her as a sail training vessel. She made her sail training debut in 1983 and in the summer of 1984 attended the 450th Anniversary of Jacques Cartier's Landing in Quebec City with many other international tall ships. Since then, Black Jack has remained on the Ottawa River where she is the focal point of the Black Jack Island Adventure Camp for youth.

In 2004, Black Jack celebrated her centennial birthday. Adrienne Clarkson, then Governor General of Canada, re-christened Black Jack at Britannia Yacht Club and helped Bytown Brigantine wish the ship well on her next 100 years of service in the Ottawa area.

In 2012, Black Jack helped Britannia Yacht Club celebrate her 125th anniversary.

== Black Jack Island Adventure Camp ==
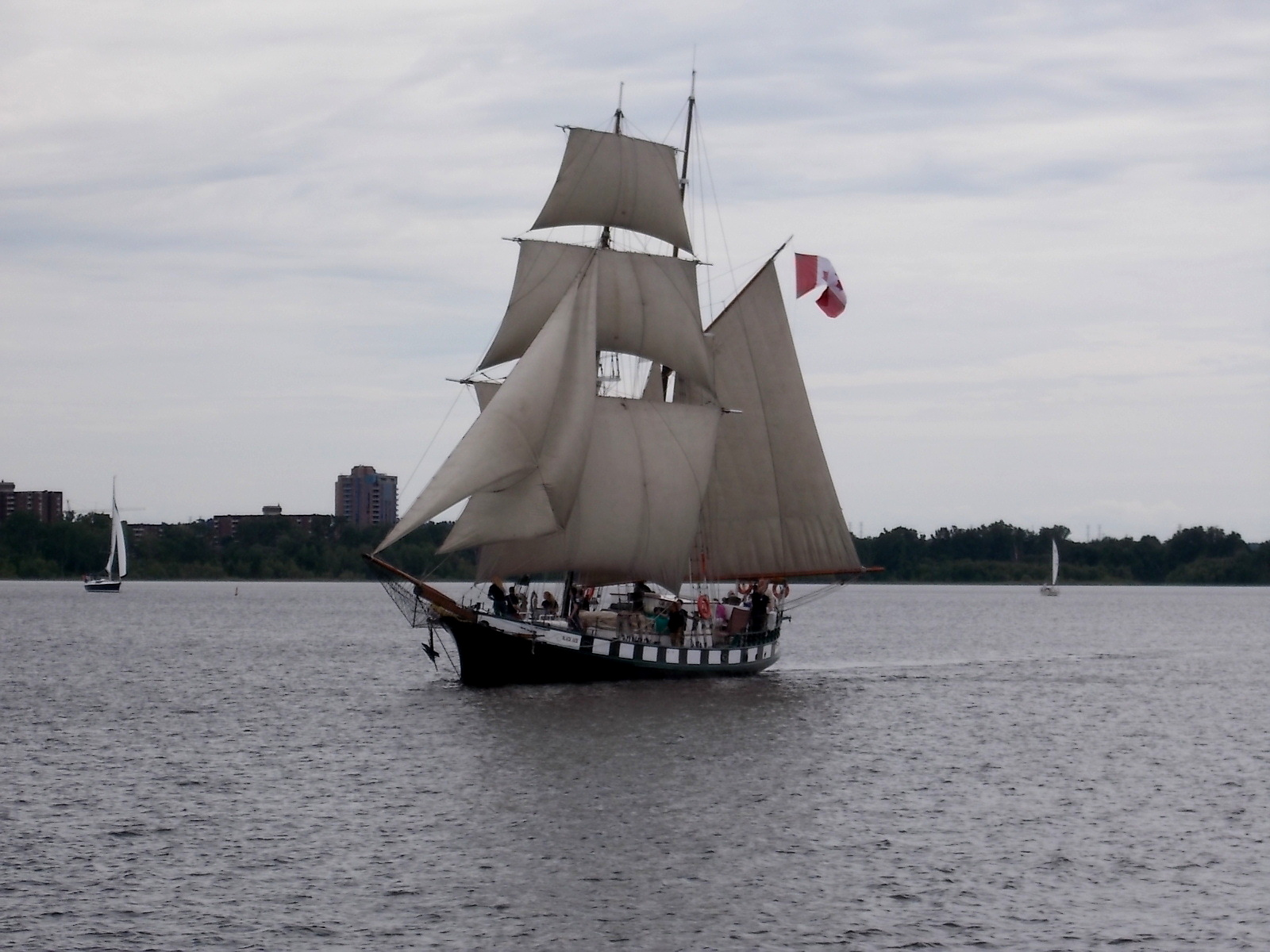
STV Black Jack on the Britannia Yacht Club's Commodore's Sail Past 2015

Black Jack is now part of a sail-training summer camp for youth 12–15 years olds on the Ottawa River. Based on a private 15-acre (61,000 m^{2}) island near Fitzroy Harbour, Ontario, participants work closely with crew to learn all aspects of seamanship, from hoisting sails and learning basic navigation to tying knots and steering.

The island is used to teach campers other aspects of sailing, navigation and teamwork. Participants sleep either aboard Black Jack (on deck or down below depending on weather), or on a floating bunkhouse moored at the island.

== Black Jack's Fleet ==
Black Jack is supported by two navy whalers and two barges. The two whalers, Agnes Irving and Alan E. Jacques, are 27-foot (8.2 m)-long traditional navy boats that can be sailed or rowed with sweeps. They have two masts, a lug-rigged main mast and a driving mizzen, as well as being equipped with 20 hp (15 kW) diesel outboard engines. They were traditionally used as training boats by the Royal Canadian Navy.

Two barges are kept moored at the island during the summer months. The Stanley Carson Bunk Barge is an authentic logging bunkhouse that was used by loggers on the Ottawa River. The two-story barge provides accommodation and cooking facilities for up to 30 people. The second barge is equipped as a well-stocked supply barge, large enough to carry vehicles and equipment.
