= Andrew Haydon Park =

Park in Ottawa, Ontario

Coordinates: 45.352266°N 75.820513°W

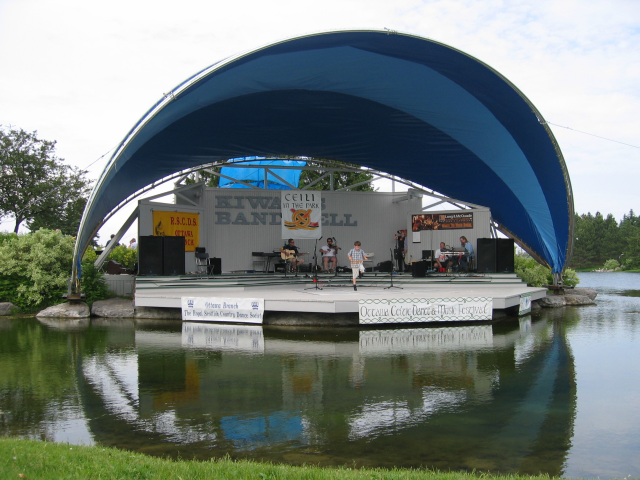
Bandshell at Andrew Haydon Park

Andrew Haydon Park is a park on the Ottawa River that is managed by the City of Ottawa, Ontario, Canada. It is situated on Carling Avenue at Holly Acres Road. The park was named after Andrew Haydon, former Reeve of Nepean. The landscape-architect, Donald W. Graham worked on this project.

There is a bandshell for outdoor concerts and a picnic area. The Nepean Sailing Club is located nearby at adjacent Dick Bell Park. The park features walking trails, play structures, and picnicking.

Migrating Canada geese, brants, ducks, and shorebirds stop over along the marshy edges of the river near the park. Resident Canada geese and mallards also inhabit the park's two ponds.

== Dogs ==
Historically, dogs have not been allowed in the park, nor in neighbouring Dick Bell park. In 2009, the city allowed dogs on a leash as a one-year pilot project. This was to try and solve the "geese problem", which was caused by too many Canada geese in the summer that excrete all over the grass and paths. This rule has since been extended indefinitely. Currently, dogs are allowed on a leash, but "are prohibited from being within five metres of all children's play areas and pools".

== Gallery ==
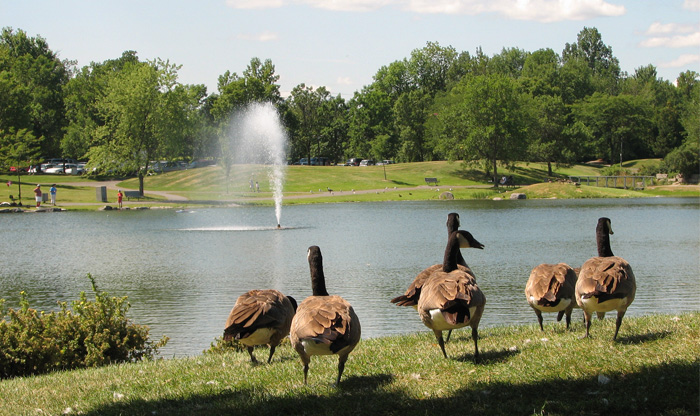
Geese have made the park their own

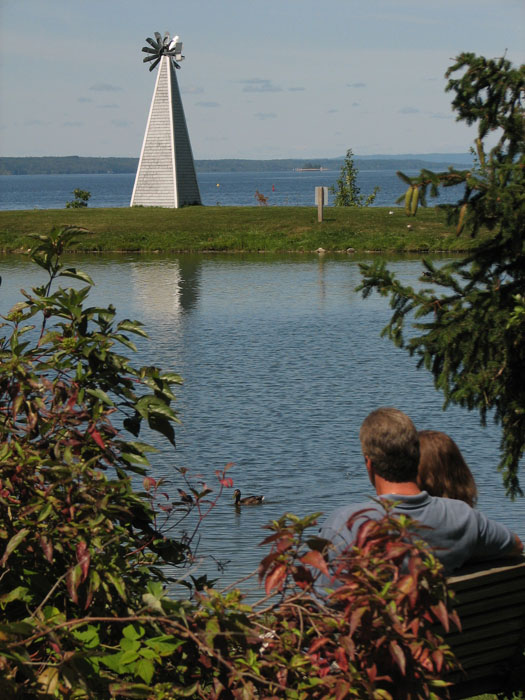
Small windmill stands between the park and the Ottawa river

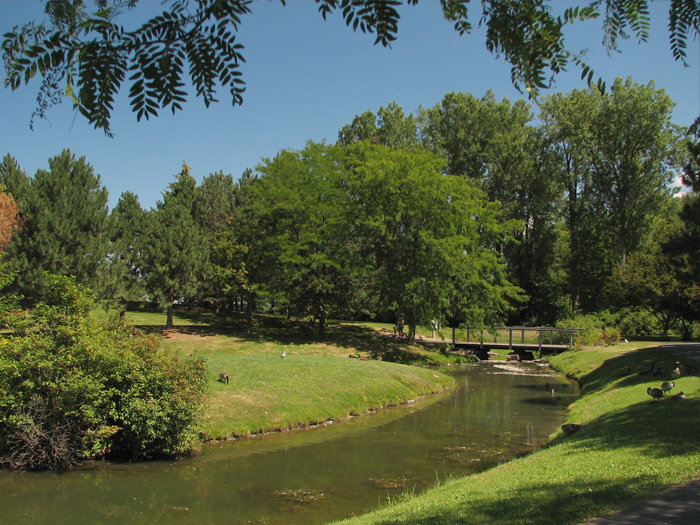
Landscaping in the park

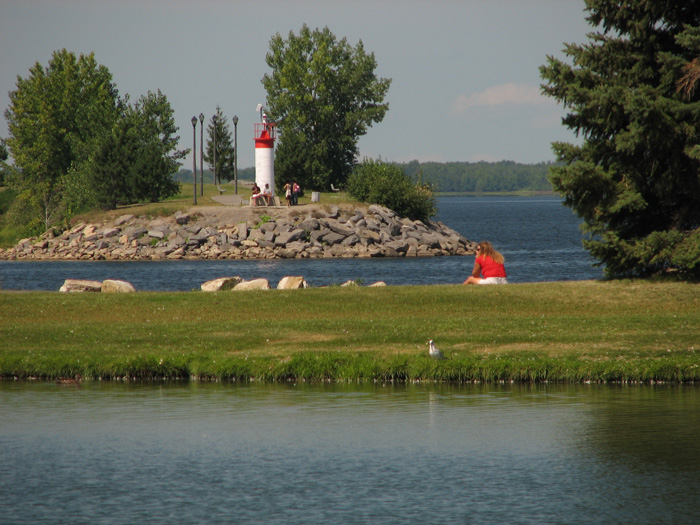
Entrance to the marina
