= Dick Bell Park =

Public park and marina in Ottawa, Ontario

Coordinates: 45°21′05″N 75°49′40″W

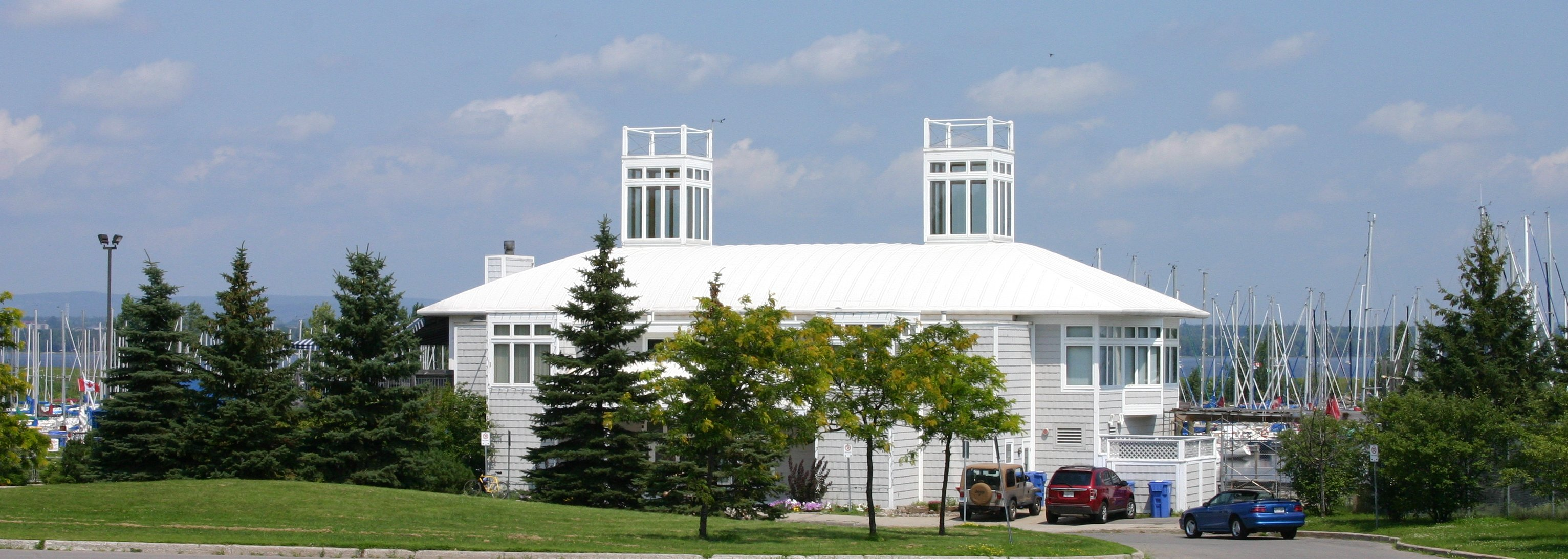
Photo of the south side of the Nepean Sailing Club, in Dick Bell Park

Dick Bell Park is a public park in Ottawa, Ontario, Canada, on the southern shore of the Ottawa River. Admission and parking are free. The park is home to the Nepean Sailing Club. The park's area, according to the city, is 18 ha; 45 acres. The official address of the park is 3259 Carling Avenue, Nepean.

== Geographical location ==
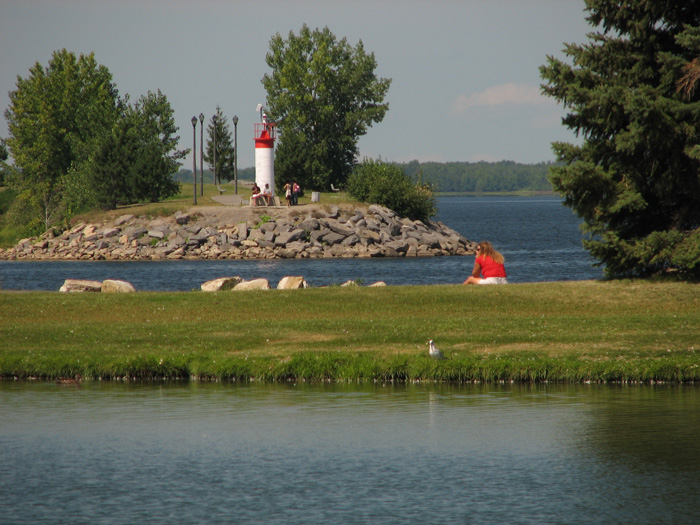
Photo taken from neighboring Andrew Haydon park. Note that the lake in the foreground and the area with the woman in red are part of Andrew Haydon park, while the lighthouse is part of Dick Bell Park.

Dick Bell Park is bordered by Carling Avenue to the south, Rocky Point to the west, and Andrew Haydon Park to the east. The border between the two parks is a small stream with a wood and metal bridge.

== Naming ==
The park was named after Dick Bell, a member of the Canadian House of Commons from 1957 to 1963, and again from 1965 to 1968. He served in the Conservative cabinet of Prime Minister John Diefenbaker as Minister of Citizenship and Immigration from 1962 to 1963.

== Rules of the park ==
=== Cyclists ===
Cyclists must dismount and must walk their bikes throughout the park.

=== Curfew ===
The city bylaw bans activity in the park after 11 pm. That includes leaving your car parked in the lot.

=== Dogs ===
Historically, dogs have not been allowed in the park, nor in neighboring Andrew Haydon park. In 2009, the city allowed dogs on a leash as a one-year pilot project. This was to try and solve the "geese problem", which was caused by too many Canada geese in the summer that excrete all over the grass and paths. This rule has since been extended indefinitely. Currently, dogs are allowed on a leash, but "are prohibited from being within five meters of all children's play areas and pools".
