= Britannia Village, Ottawa =

- Neighbourhood
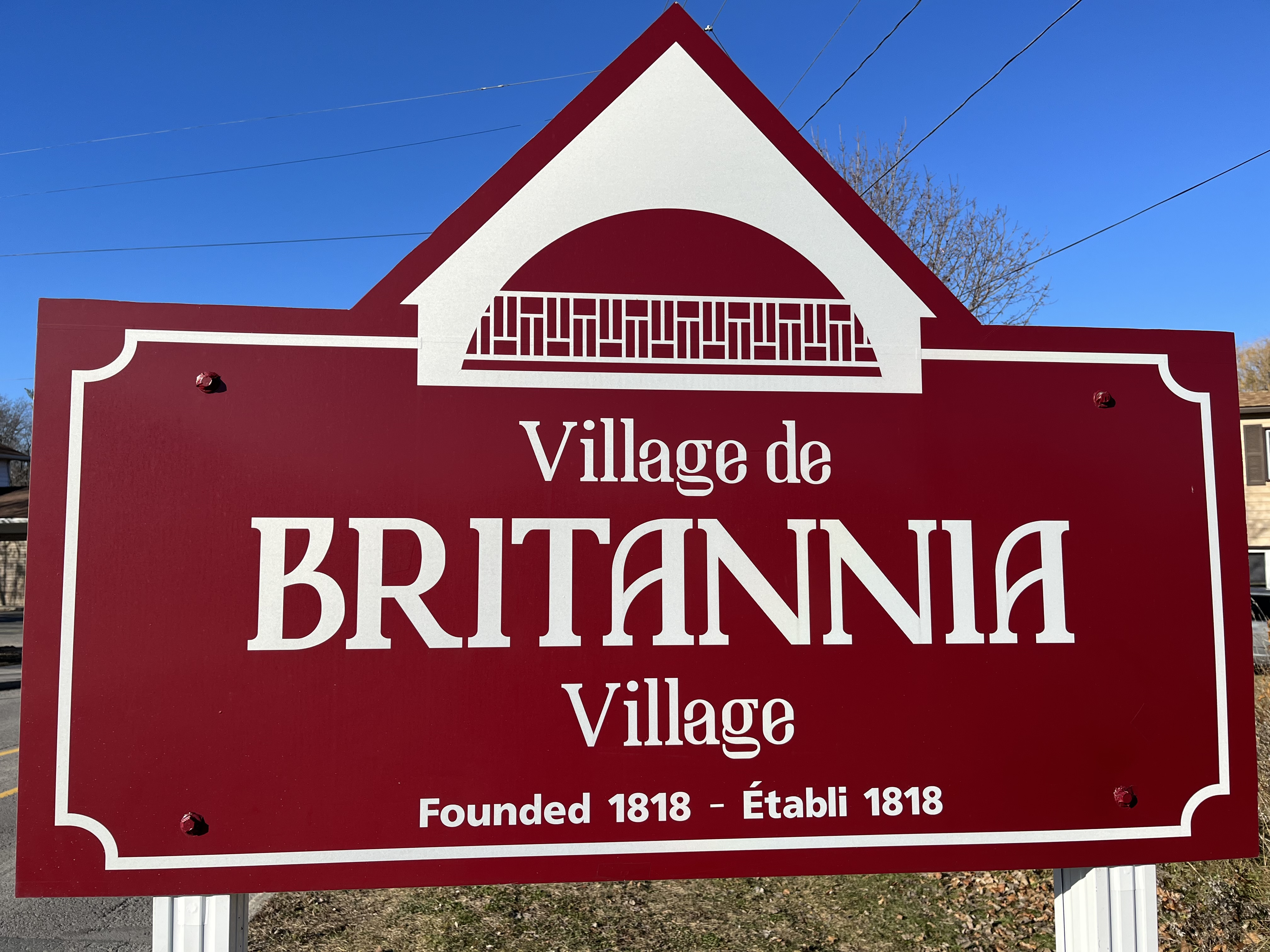
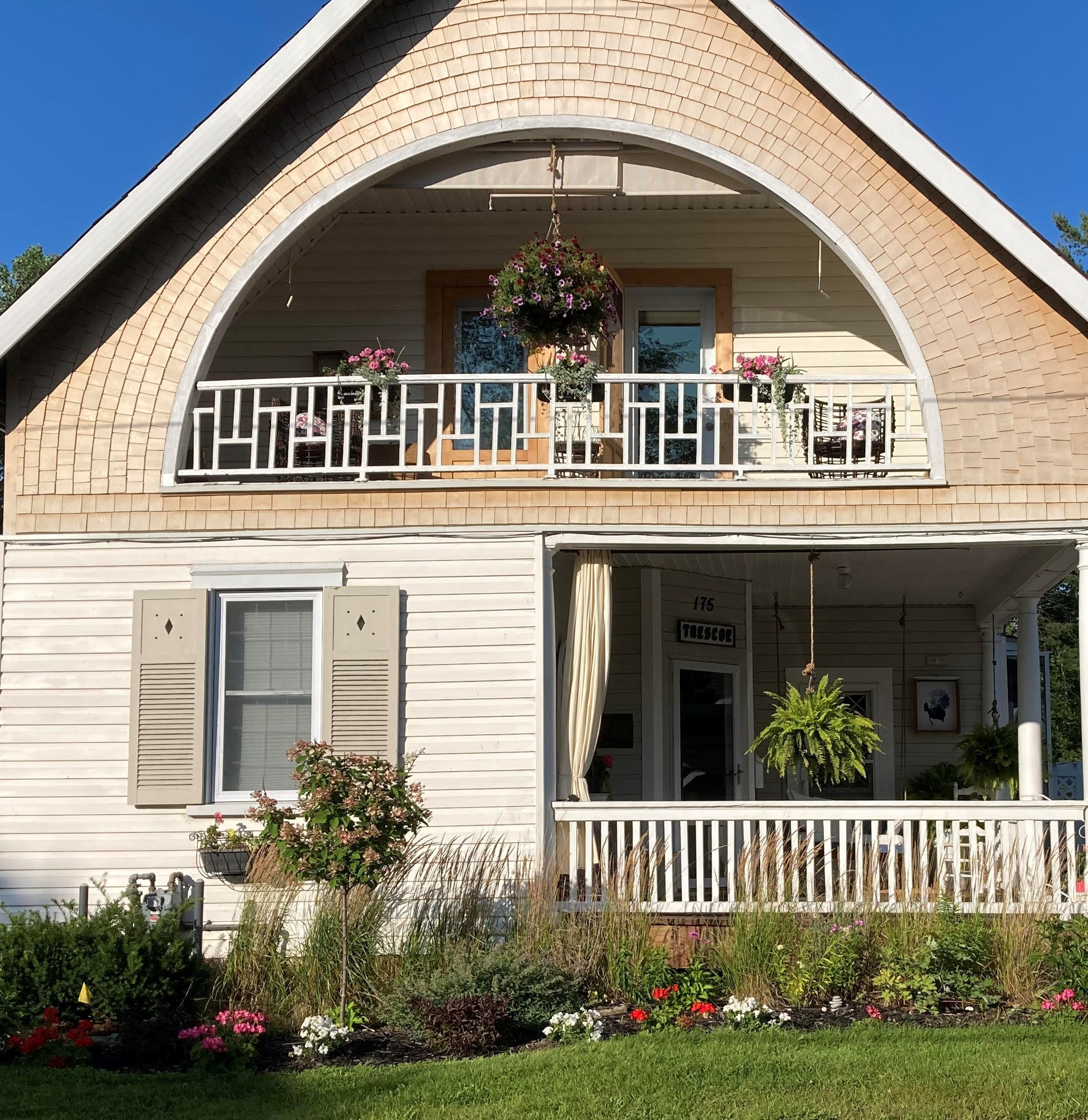
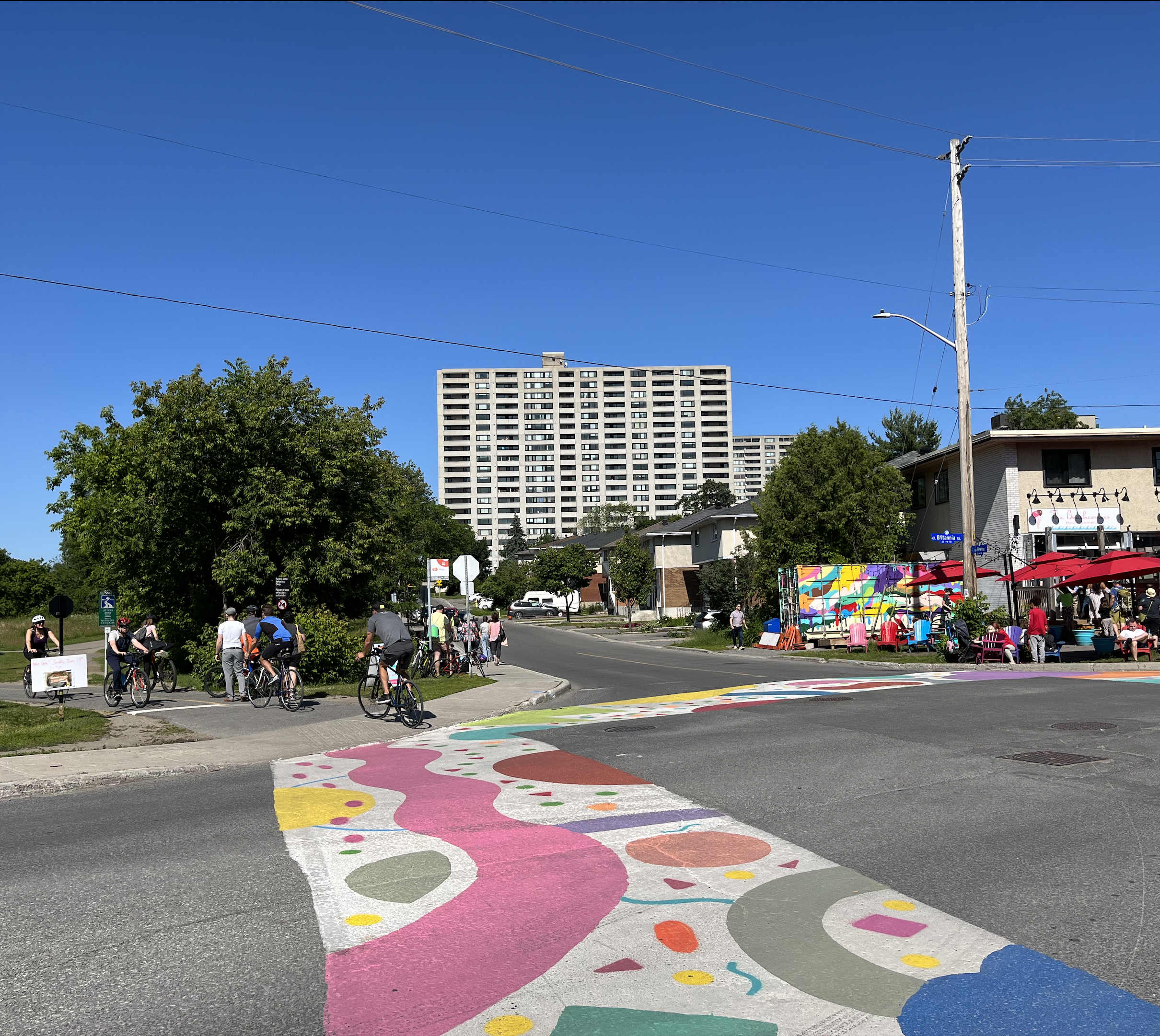
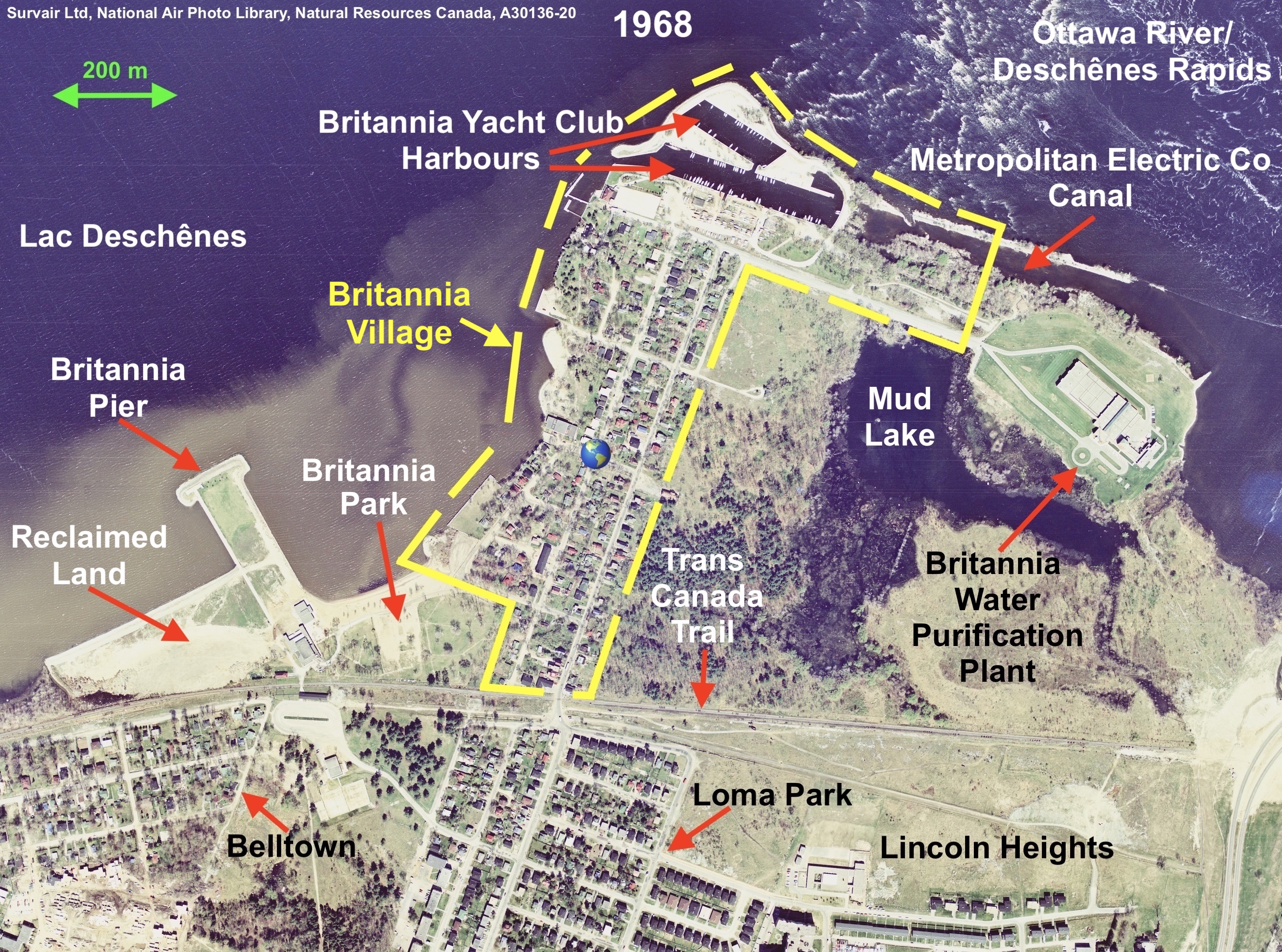
- Village Sign with Heritage Motif (top) Semi-Circular, Inset Upper Balcony, 1908 Village Entrance and the Trans Canada Trail Map of Britannia Village, Ottawa (Note: The map was photographed in 1968 from an altitude of approximately 2,400 metres. The current village boundaries are the same as they were in 1968.) (Note: In 1900, the beach was on both sides of Britannia Pier. During the 1960s, Britannia Park was expanded through land reclamation on both the east and west side of the pier; in the process, the beach on the west side was obliterated and replaced with grass. On the map, the retaining wall on the left side of the pier shows the extent of the reclamation.) (Note: The original Britannia Pier (30 ft wide) built in 1900 was widened by the City of Ottawa to approximately 260 ft in the 1950/60s. The original, T-shaped pier can be seen on the map embedded on the left side of the widened pier. During the 70s, a beach and three breakwaters were added to the end of the pier. Consult the GeoOttawa aerial photo timeline slider for more detailed photos of this development.)
- Interactive map of Britannia Village, Ottawa
- Coordinates: 45°22′07.7″N 75°47′59.2″W
- Country: Canada
- Province: Ontario
- City: Ottawa

Government
  - MPs: Anita Vandenbeld
  - MPPs: Chandra Pasma
  - Councillors: Theresa Kavanagh
  - Governing body: Britannia Village Community Association
  - President: Jonathan Morris
- Elevation: 60 m (200 ft)

Population
  - Total: 610
- Canada 2021 Census
- Website: bvcaottawa.wordpress.com/Britannia

Britannia Village is a neighbourhood in the greater Britannia area, part of Bay Ward in the west end of Ottawa, Ontario, Canada, about 13 km from the Canadian Parliament Buildings.

Britannia Village has a rich history and architecture, having been founded some eight years before Bytown (est. 1826), the former name of Ottawa, Ontario, Canada. The history of the village is interwoven with the creation of the adjacent Britannia Amusement Park, once known as Coney Island of the north, and today simply known as Britannia Park. The character of villagers is significantly influenced by its natural surroundings.

Geographically, the village is located on a broad peninsula and is largely defined by natural boundaries. According to the Ottawa Neighbourhood Study, the village is bordered by the Ottawa River to the North, Lac Deschênes and Britannia Park to the west, the Trans Canada Trail to the south, and Mud Lake (Britannia Conservation Area, 79 hectares) to the east. Lac Deschênes is home to 4 sailing clubs including the Britannia Yacht Club which is located in the village. The village also borders on Britannia Beach, one of four beaches in Ottawa. Britannia Road is the only road into and out of the village and the only access to the Britannia Water Purification Plant.

The village has a total population of 610 people in 270 private households. The village has an active association (Britannia Village Community Association or BVCA) and a community Facebook page (Friends of Britannia Village).

== History ==
Self-guided, audio walking tour of Britannia Village (May 1, 2020)
History and geography, Michael M. Kaulbars (Note: Michael M. Kaulbars (1956 - 2026) was the creator of the blog “Britannia: A History”)

The archaeological record from the early 1900s provides ample evidence of Indigenous peoples on the beaches of Lac Deschênes, and hence in and around the village; the evidence is largely in the form of indigenous beach workshops where the Algonquin Anishinaabe would chip out flint arrowheads or laboriously grind an edge into a stone tomahawk. Archaeological artifacts were discovered at Chartrand Island and other locations on the Ontario side of Lac Deschênes. In a subsequent publication, the same author postulates that the flint for toolmaking was likely picked up or quarried in Gatineau and Ottawa (current names) and subsequently transported to the beach workshops.

The neighbourhood was established in 1818.

=== Mill town (1826–1887) ===
In 1826, Captain John Le Breton, a seriously injured soldier in the War of 1812, first established a flour mill and then a successful lumber mill in the village, then part of the Nepean Township. At the time, as part of the Ottawa River timber trade, logs were floated down the river in timber rafts (bundled logs) to get to the burgeoning construction market in Bytown (Ottawa), some 14 km away. However, the Deschênes Rapids, with its vertical drop of about 9 ft, presented a formidable challenge. The timber rafts had to be disassembled, guided through the rapids one log at-a-time by 2 or 3 raftsmen, and subsequently reassembled. By creating a mill at the head of the Deschênes Rapids, Le Breton was able to convince logging companies to cut their logs at his sawmill to avoid the cost of both reassembling the timber rafts and floating them to Bytown. LeBreton transported the cut lumber overland by horse and cart to Bytown along Richmond Rd that had been created a few years earlier. Mill workers included labourers and carpenters, and most lived in the village.

The mill changed owners (Nelson G. Robinson, 1846; John McAmmond Jr., 1873), eventually producing up to 100,000 boards per year (1860), and also including a carding mill, carpenter shop and a forge. In the process, a second sawmill was established in the village along the bay near the foot of Rowatt St. The last owner of the mills (John C. Jamieson) could not make the business profitable because of a stock market crash and competition from larger mills. By 1875, a post office (48 Britannia Rd) had been established in the village on the basis of 25 residences.

=== Summer-cottage resort (1887–1960) ===
In 1887, rather than converting the mills into pulp and paper factories, which some of his competitors were doing, Jamieson chose to convert them into summer-rental residences with ample storage space underneath for boats. This new tourist destination was served by the Canada Central Railway line (est. 1870) that brought tourists from Ottawa to the village. Summer tourists included the Confederation Poet Archibald Lampman who would rent out his Ottawa residence and live in the village for the summer. Lampman’s sonnets, particularly those on the subject of nature, are among the best in the English language.

Cottage-building in the village flourished at the beginning of this era because of the creation of a major amusement park adjacent to the village and the establishment of a boat club also in 1887. The main tourist attraction in the amusement park was a long, thin, wooden pier which was built on the rubble from a canal intended for generating power.

==== Engineering feats ====
===== The Metropolitan Electric Co canal =====
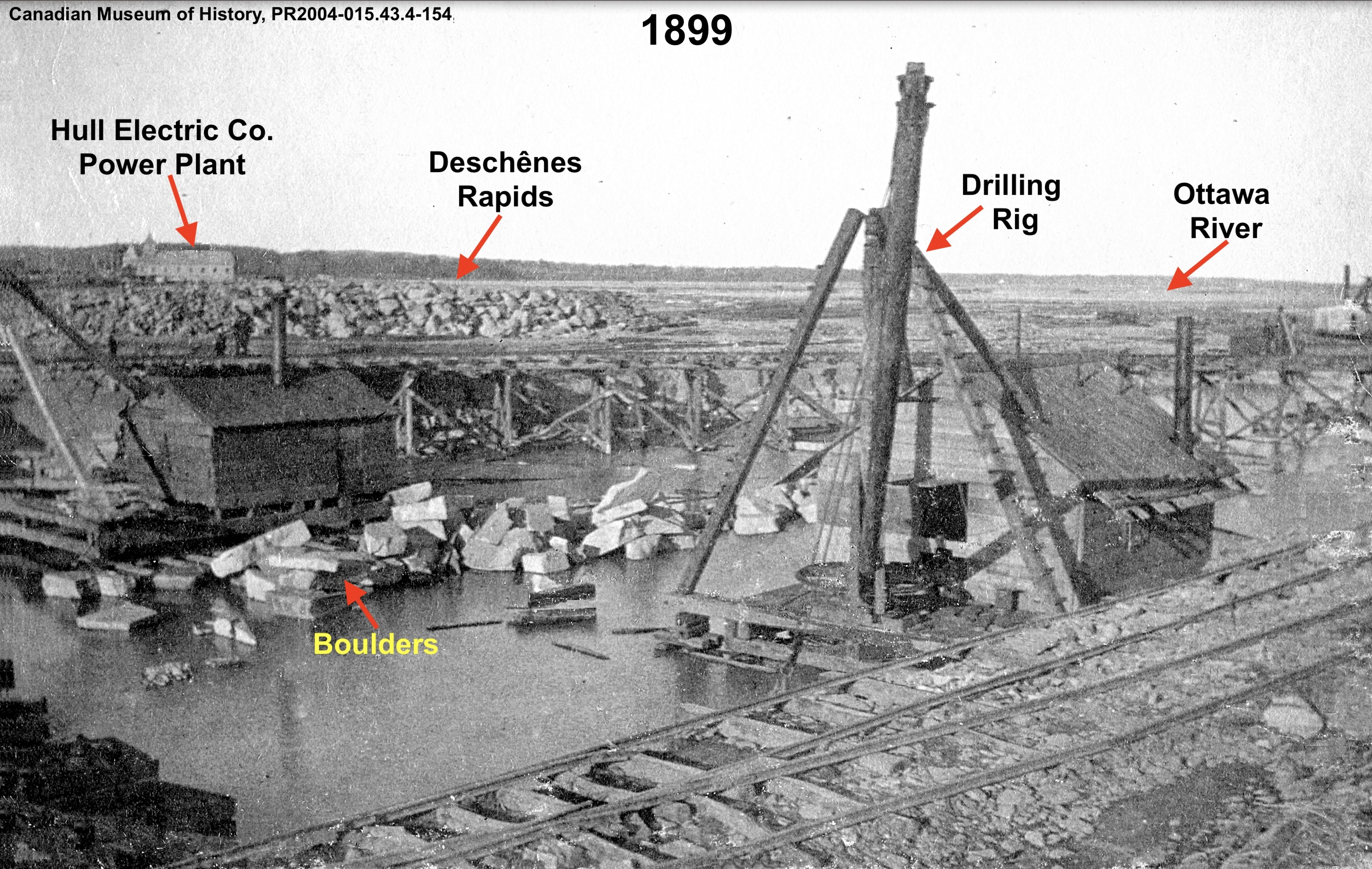
Metropolitan Electric Co. excavated (1898–1900) a canal intended to generate power. As a byproduct, large boulders were hauled about 1 km by horse/cart to provide the foundation of the Britannia Pier (1899).

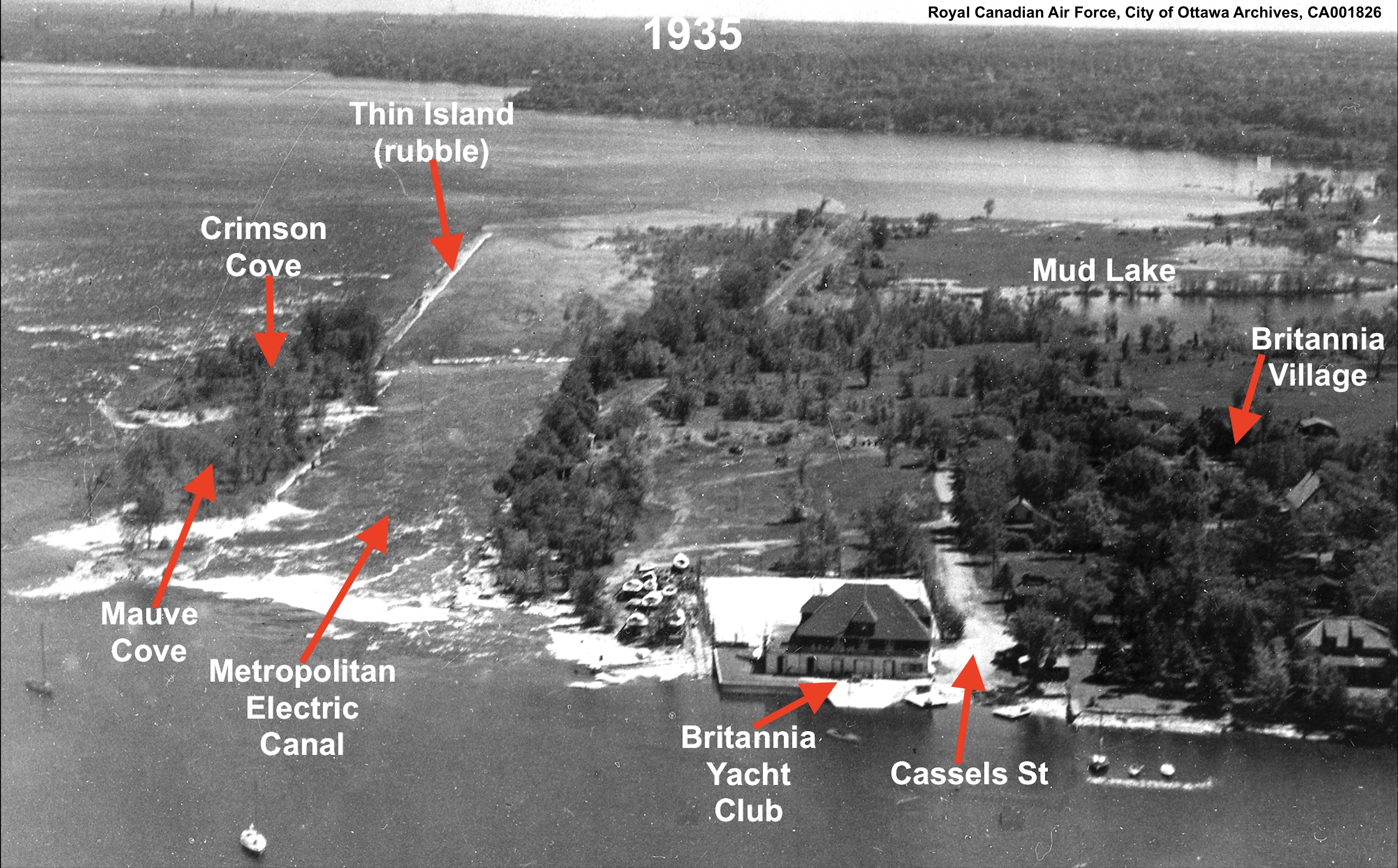
Near completion of the canal, the hydroelectric project was deemed unfeasible and the powerhouse was never installed. However, the Britannia Yacht Club used the canal to create two protected harbours in two phases (1935).

Following the invention of dynamite in 1867, the Metropolitan Electric Co. (Peoria, Illinois) excavated a canal [(12 ft deep × 150 ft wide) × 2,500 ft long (approx.)] on the north shore of the village to generate electricity. The Hull Electric Company had already successfully used the Deschênes Rapids to generate electricity on the other side of the Ottawa River. Between 1898 and 1900, Metropolitan Electric employed up to 350 workers at one time and spent nearly half a million dollars (about $17M in 2022 dollars). The company ran out of money and the project was abandoned before the powerhouse could be installed. Most of the excavated rubble was piled alongside the canal; on the north side, this resulted in the formation of a thin island that is easily visible when standing on the shore of the river at the Britannia Water Purification Plant. Rubble piled on the south side resulted in a large breakwater that now has a hiking trail on top of it.

At the time, the canal construction project was very newsworthy and a timeline compilation of 46 archived newspaper articles is available, as are online photographs. Even though the hydroelectric project failed, the Metropolitan Electric canal made possible two highly innovative projects: the Britannia Pier and the harbours of the Britannia Yacht Club.

===== The Britannia Pier =====
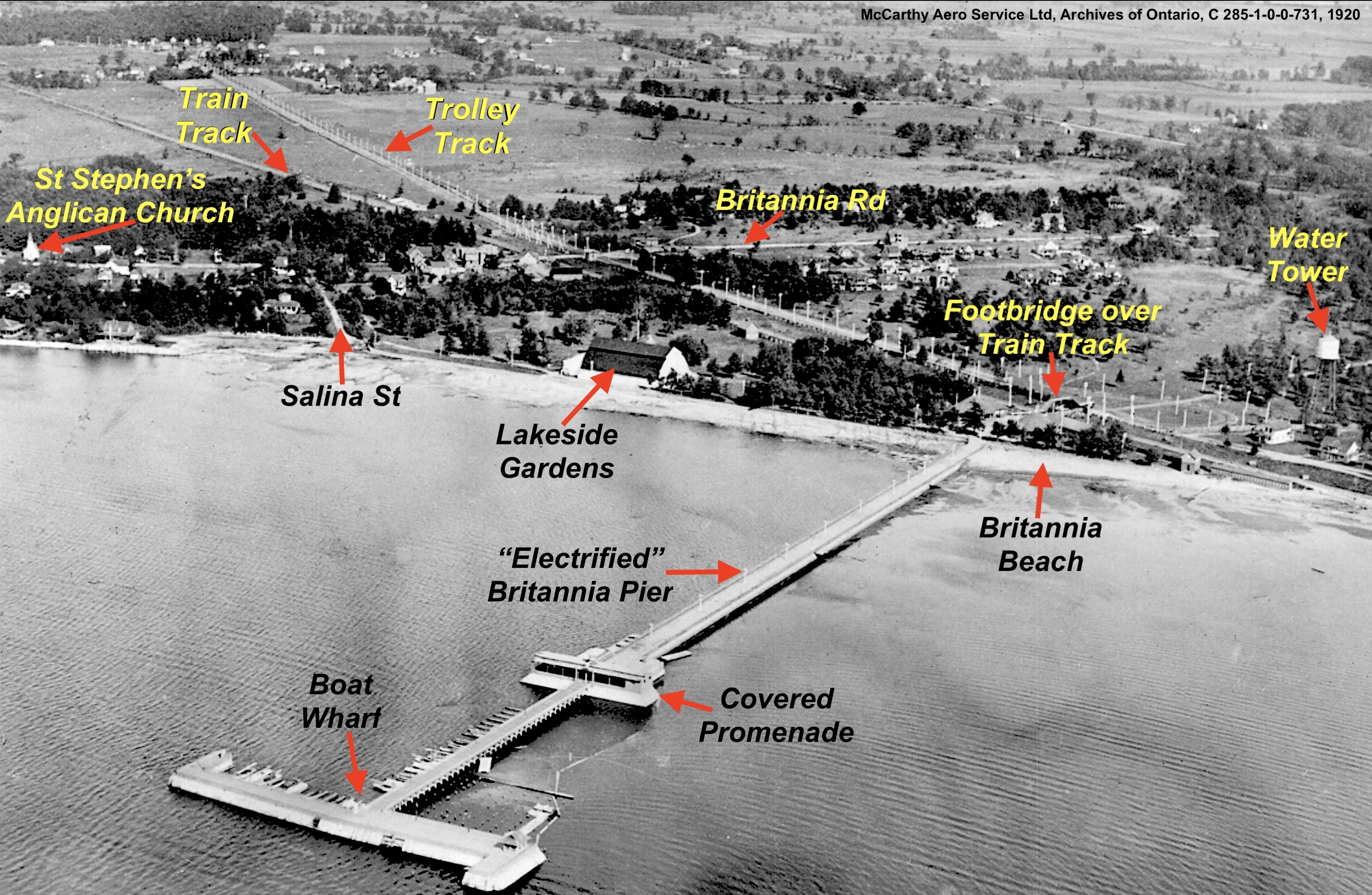
The wooden, 1,450 ft-long Britannia Pier built on boulders from the failed Metropolitan Electric hydro project. During the 1960s, the pier was widened from 30 ft to about 245 ft. The village is to the left of Lakeside Gardens (1920).

Large boulders from the excavated Metropolitan Electric canal were used as the foundation for the wood-surfaced Britannia Pier. By February 22, 1900, men had cut a huge hole in the ice to the bottom of Lac Deschênes in the shape/dimensions of the pier (i.e. approximately 30 ft by 1,050 ft, later extended to 1,450 ft); the ice was at least 20 inches thick, but considerably less thick than the prior year. Large boulders were then carted by 25 teams of horses/men from the south shore of the Metropolitan Electric canal and dumped/layered into the hole. According to one report, the stone work was 32 ft wide at the bottom and 20 ft wide at the top, with the depth varying up to 11 ft in height. This operation was carried out during a mild spell when the temperature hovered between −1 °C and −4 °C (four days later on February 26 it was −28 °C). Later when the ice melted, the top of the layered stones was covered with concrete and the wooden pier was built on top. The building method of the Britannia Pier is relatively unique for its scale and the direct use of ice openings for foundational work. However, in the era from 1893 to 1930, there were other examples of piers being built using ice. However, these involved using a wooden crib on the surface of the ice, loading boulders into the crib, and waiting for the ice to melt to sink the boulders onto the river bottom.

By June 5, 1900, only some fifteen weeks after starting the work, the pier was largely finished except for completion of wooden benches running along both sides. Lighting on telephone poles was accomplished by using electric lamps, each containing two sealed globes. This patented technology was said to be superior to lighting technology used in downtown Ottawa. The Britannia Pier was the only pier of its kind in Canada.

===== Harbours of the Britannia Yacht Club (BYC) =====
Some 50 years after the Metropolitan Electric project, the Britannia Yacht Club (BYC) used the abandoned canal to create two highly protected harbours. In 1949, a year before the harbour construction began, the BYC fleet only had about 45 boats (3 schooners, more than a dozen larger cruising-class boats and 30 dinghies) with a membership of about 200. The harbours replaced the wave-lashed moorings which in previous years had been responsible for damaging and sinking of many of BYC's fleet. To expand the club, clearly BYC needed more and better mooring facilities. The initiative was led by Captain Thomas Fuller and Reginald Bruce. Hundreds of volunteers, over many years, were recruited by the Ladies Auxiliary. By the end of the 1960s, the BYC had 340 sail boats, not including power crafts, and a membership of 1,250. The harbours were created from 1950 to 1969 in two phases.

Construction of the Main (Phase 1) and Inner Harbours (Phase 2) - 1950 to 1969
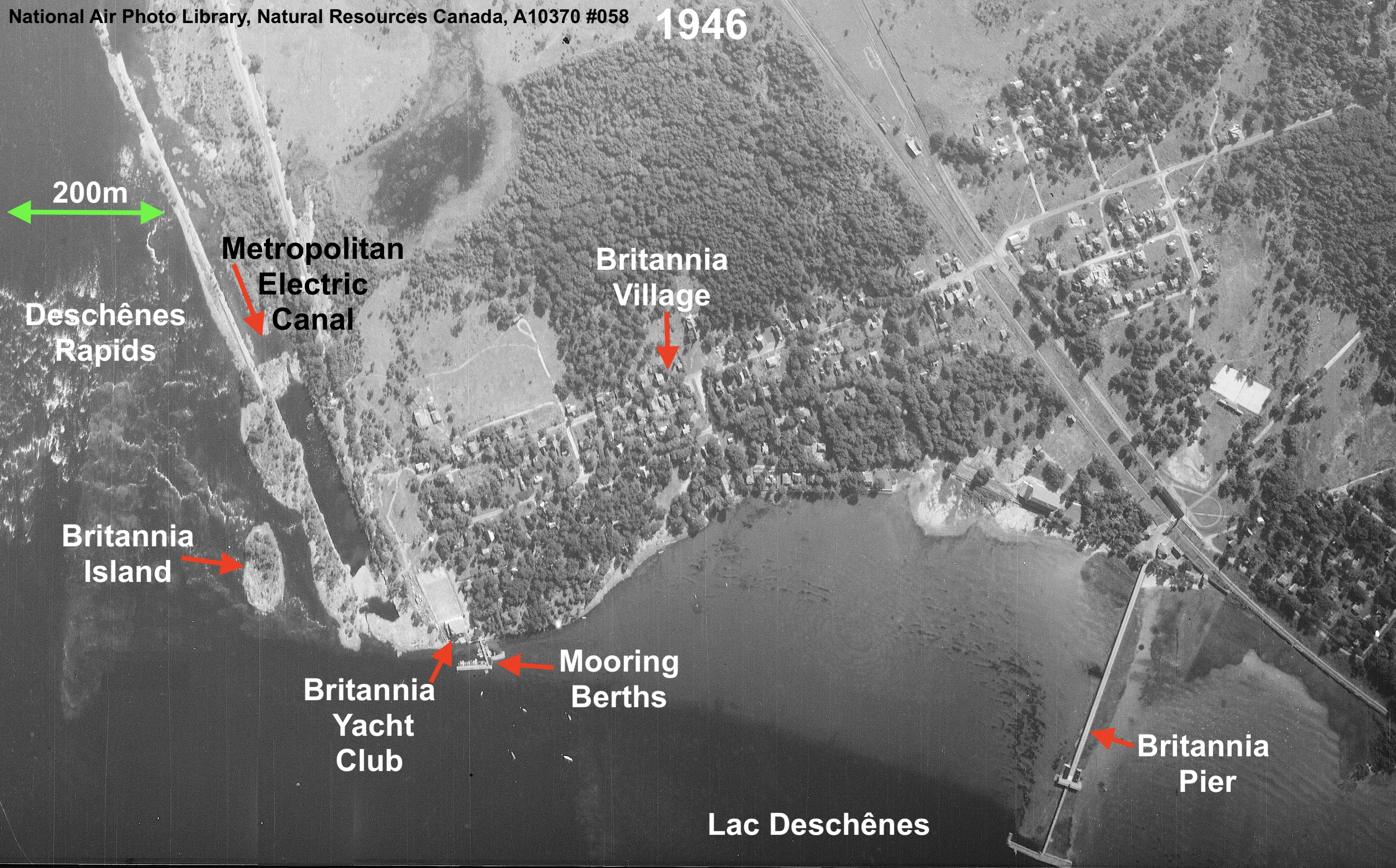
Vertical aerial view of the landscape when Captain Tom Fuller and Reg Bruce contemplated creating two new boat harbours for the BYC whose mooring berths were at full capacity (1946).

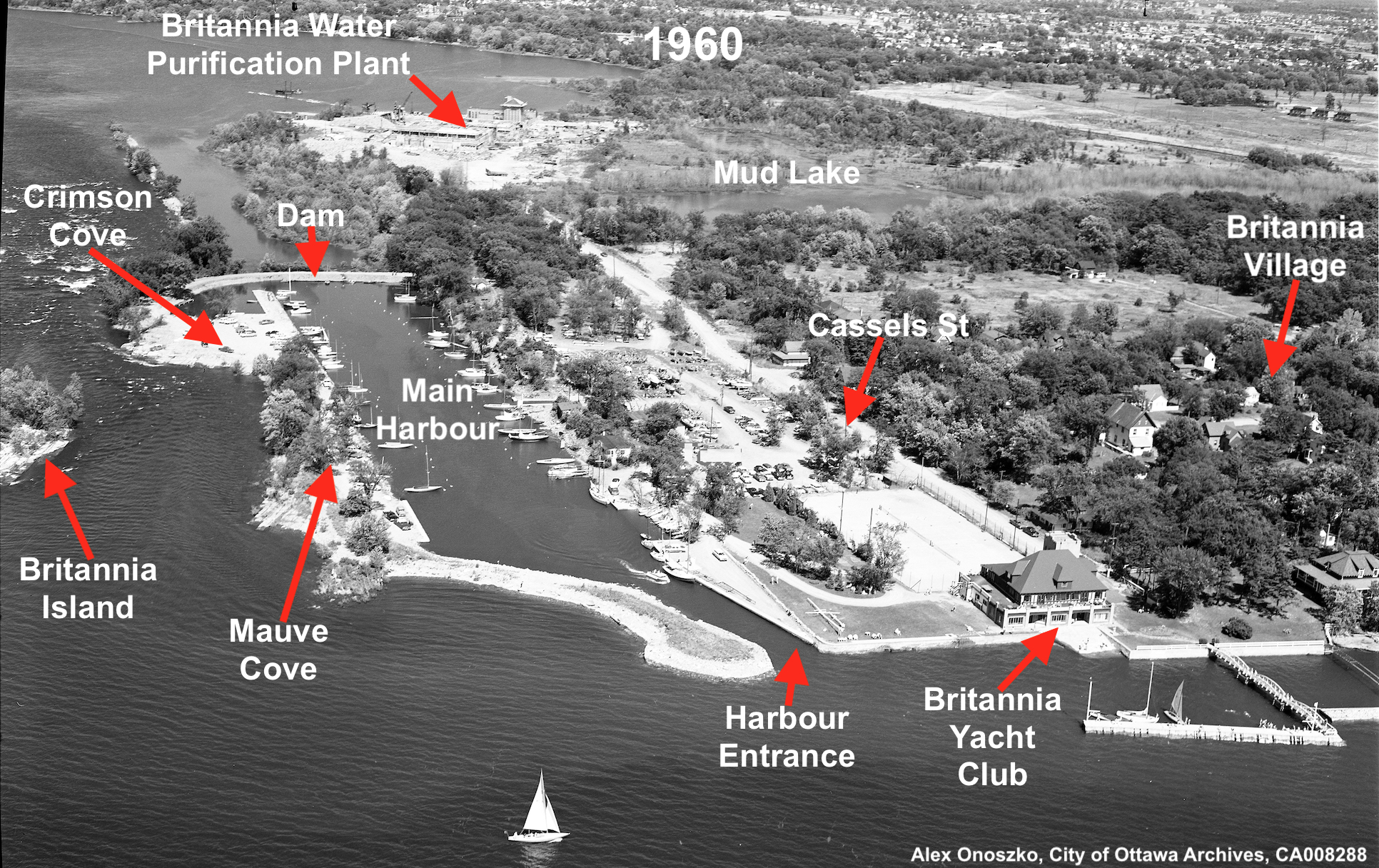
Oblique aerial view after Phase 1 (1950–1951) showing Crimson Cove and Mauve Cove now incorporated into the property of the BYC. Fill was used to dam the canal and to create the harbour entrance (1960).

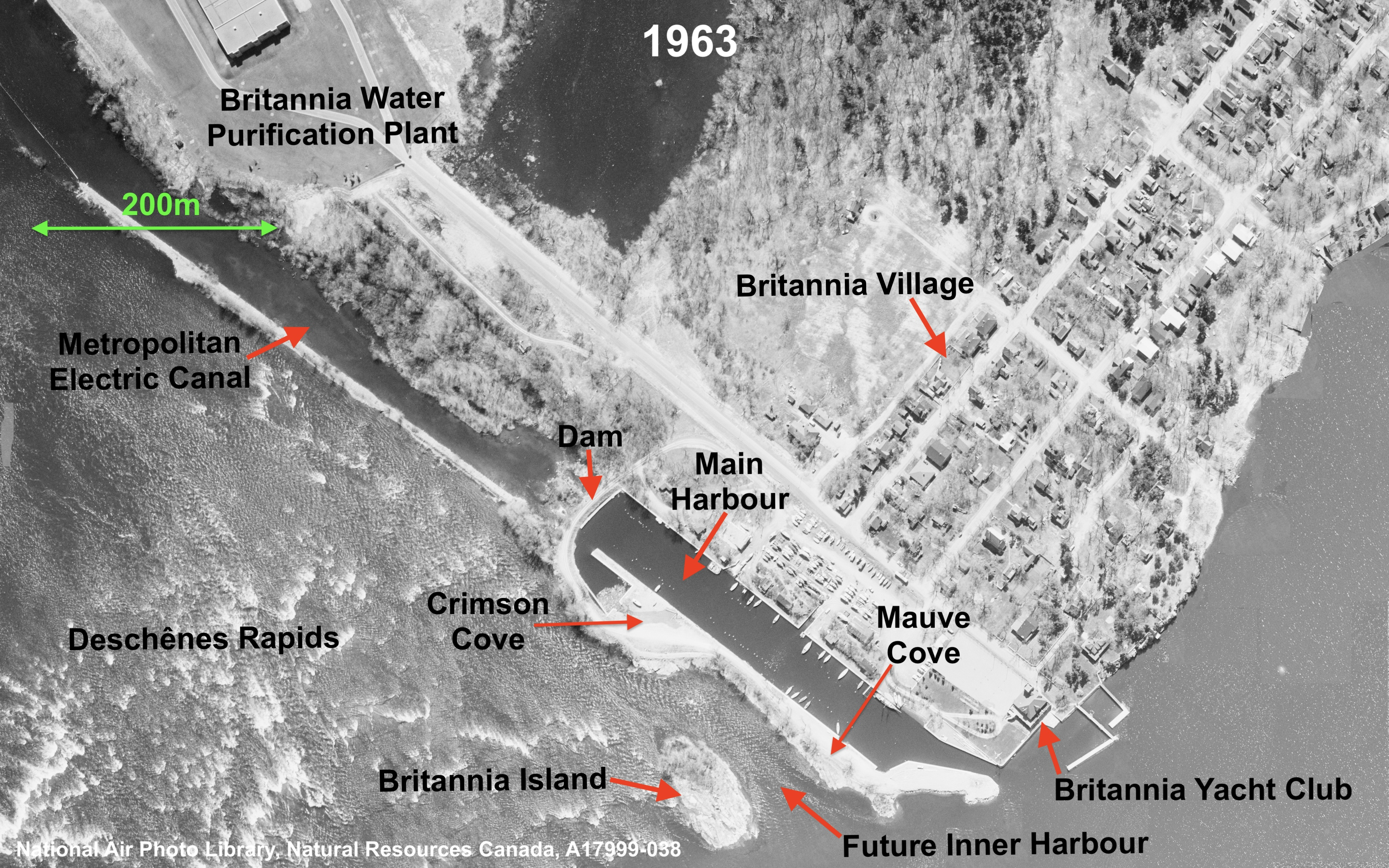
Vertical aerial view after Phase 1 (1950–1951) construction highlighting how Britannia Island would facilitate the creation of the inner harbour in Phase 2 (May 6,1963).

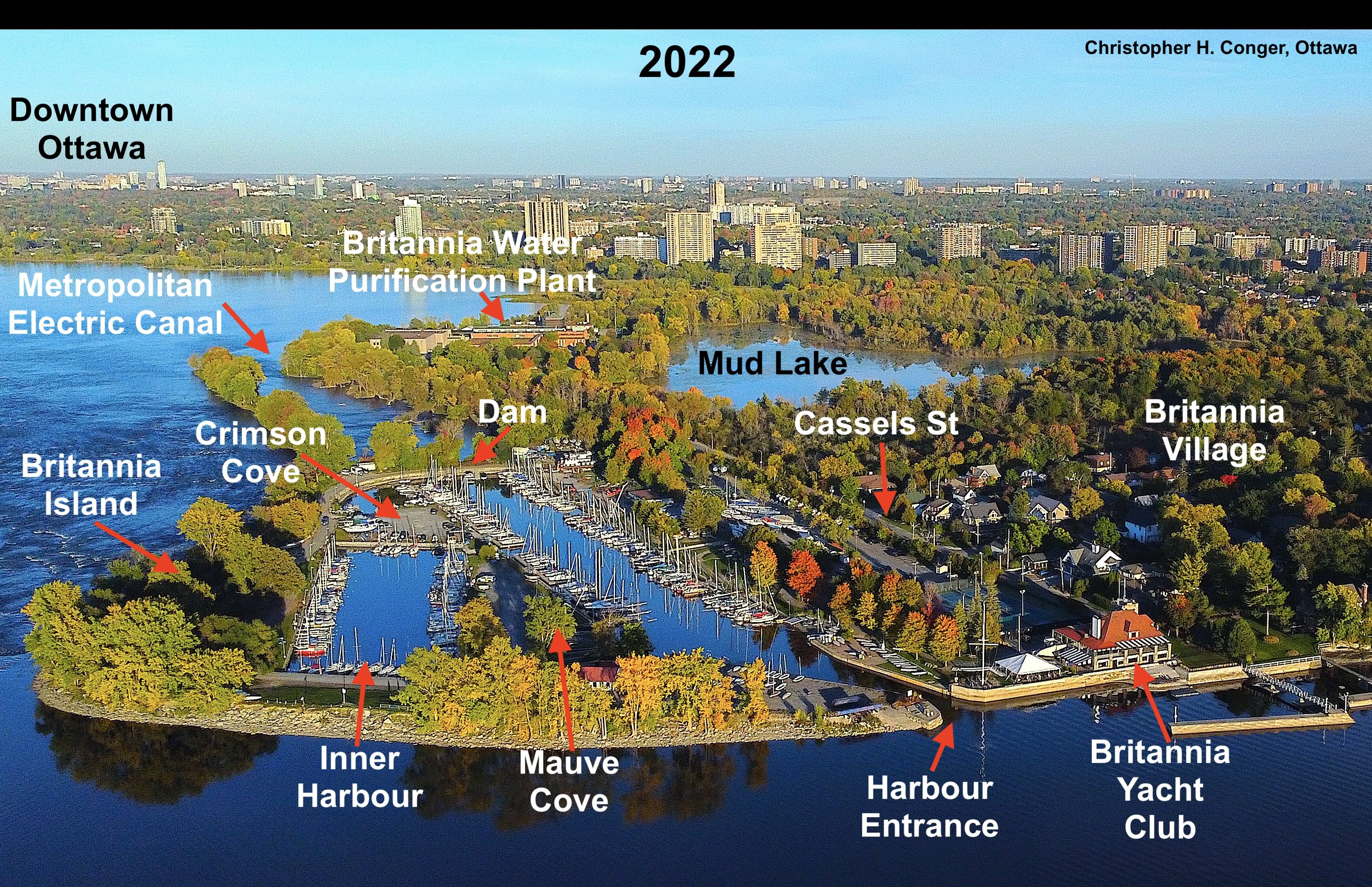
Oblique aerial view after Phase 2 (1963–1969). Britannia Island is now part of the property of the BYC, and the inner harbour is one of the best-sheltered yacht harbours in North America (2022).

In the first phase, 1950 – 1951, tonnes of rock and shale were first removed from the bottom of the Metropolitan canal and used to build a retaining wall between the canal and the Deschênes Rapids. The floor of the canal was graded to provide a constant depth throughout. Necessary permits were obtained to allow the BYC to utilize the islands (Crimson Cove and Mauve Cove) resulting from the creation of the canal. A giant dam across the canal (about 200 ft long, 15 ft high and 30 ft thick) was built. The harbour entrance was created by blasting out a 50 ft bedrock ledge separating the canal from Lac Deschênes.

In the second phase, 1963 – 1969, the channel between Britannia Island (Note: Although Britannia Island is still officially named in the Ontario Geographic Names database, the Britannia Yacht Club has renamed it Emerald Cove.) and the mainland was dammed to create the inner harbour, which was subsequently dug out. Boat traffic between the inner and main harbours was facilitated by blasting a channel between them. The inner harbour is one of the best-sheltered yacht harbours in North America.

==== Britannia Amusement Park ====
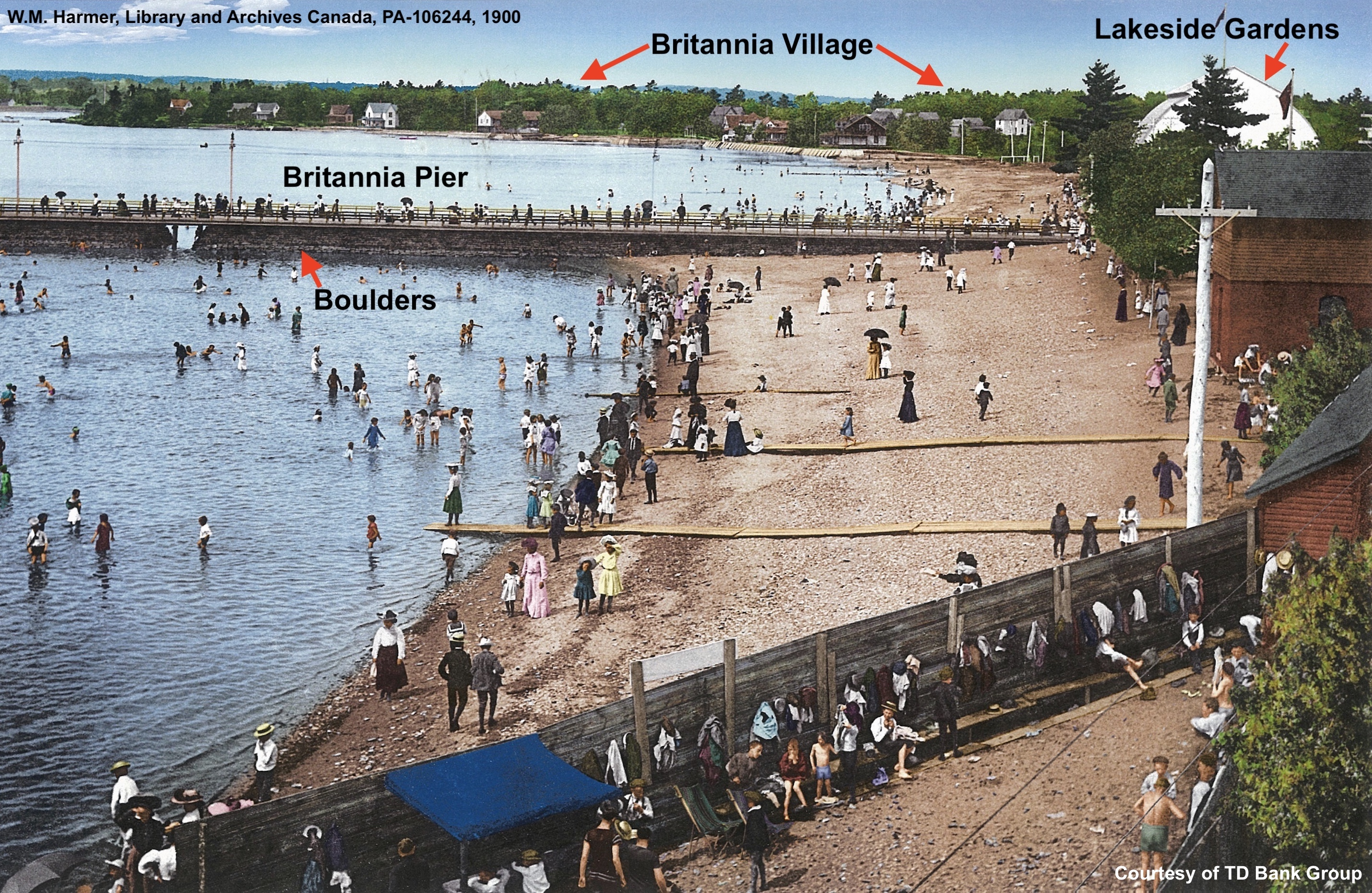
Colourized photo of Britannia Pier and beaches. The pier was built on boulders from the failed Metropolitan Electric canal. The large beach in the foreground has since been replaced by grass (see notes on village map) (1900).

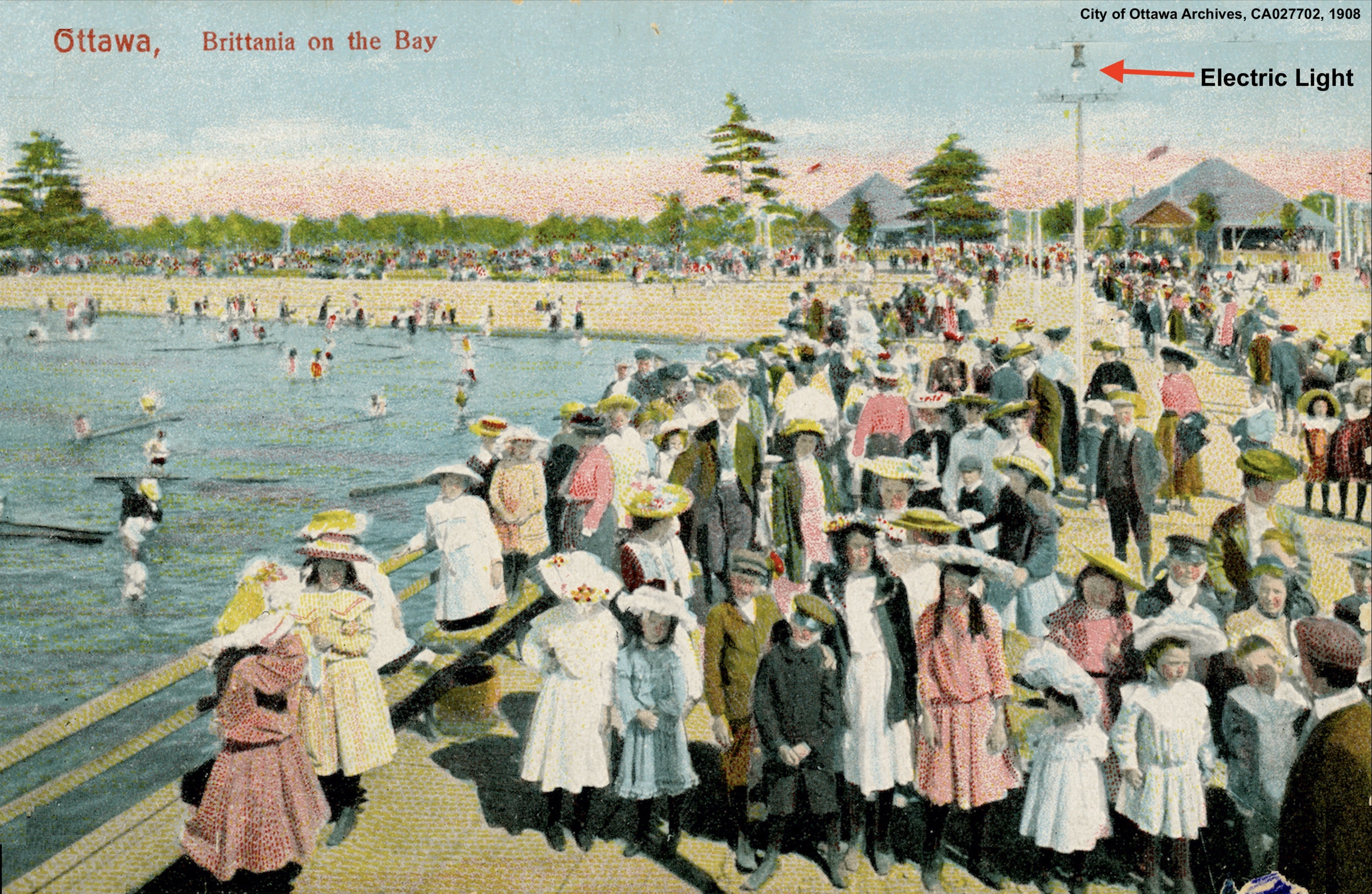
Colourized postcard illustrating throngs on the wooden, electrified Britannia Pier. Modesty was emphasized with day dresses covering the body and long sleeves covering the arms (1908).

In 1900, the Ottawa Electric Railway (OER) company opened an 18-acre amusement park which was expanded to 53 acres in 1904; the firm purchased the land from Britannia Village landowners. The amusement park, with its pier that was considered an architectural wonder at the time, was often compared to the amusement park at Coney Island, NY. An estimated 12,000 to 15,000 visitors attended the opening (May 24, 1900) of the park. Like other transportation companies of the era, OER electric trolleys were busy during the workweek but under utilized during the weekend. In an era without cars, the OER built the park as a fresh-air, weekend escape from polluted Bytown, thereby increasing their trolley use and income. The park was also serviced by a Canadian Pacific Railway line.

The park became one of Canada's top tourist attractions at the time, and facilitated a rapid residential housing/cottage boom in the village. In 1890, 1900 and 1910, the combined number of cottages and permanent residences in the village was 38, 83 and 166, respectively. During this era, the village also became quite fashionable when several prominent Ottawa figures began to reside there. The park had a reputation as the People's Playground.

Britannia Amusement Park Infrastructure
(based on a 1910 map from the Ottawa Electric Railway company)
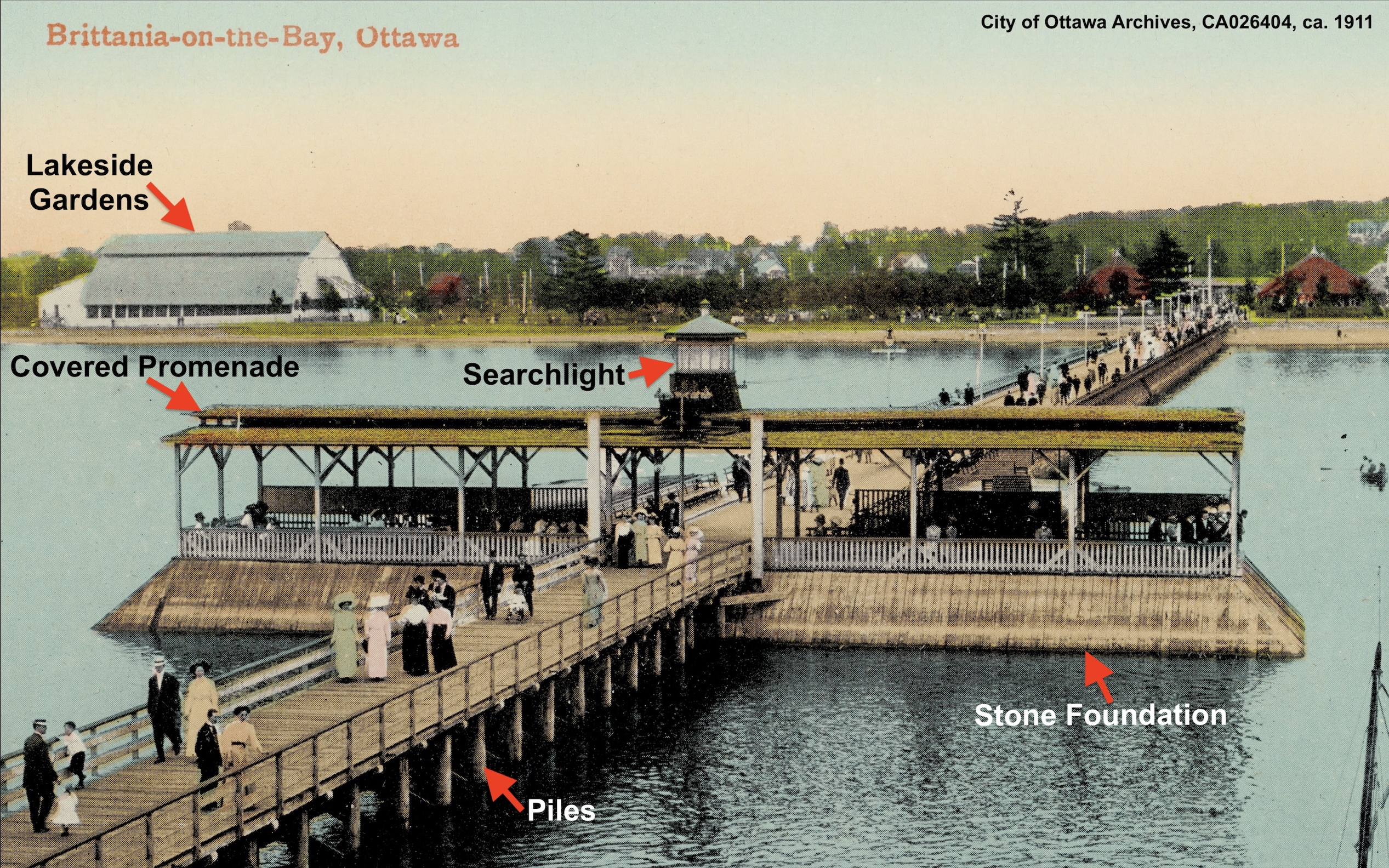
Colourized postcard focussing on the covered promenade on the Britannia Pier, the only one of its kind in Canada. A searchlight provided a spectacular night view (1911).

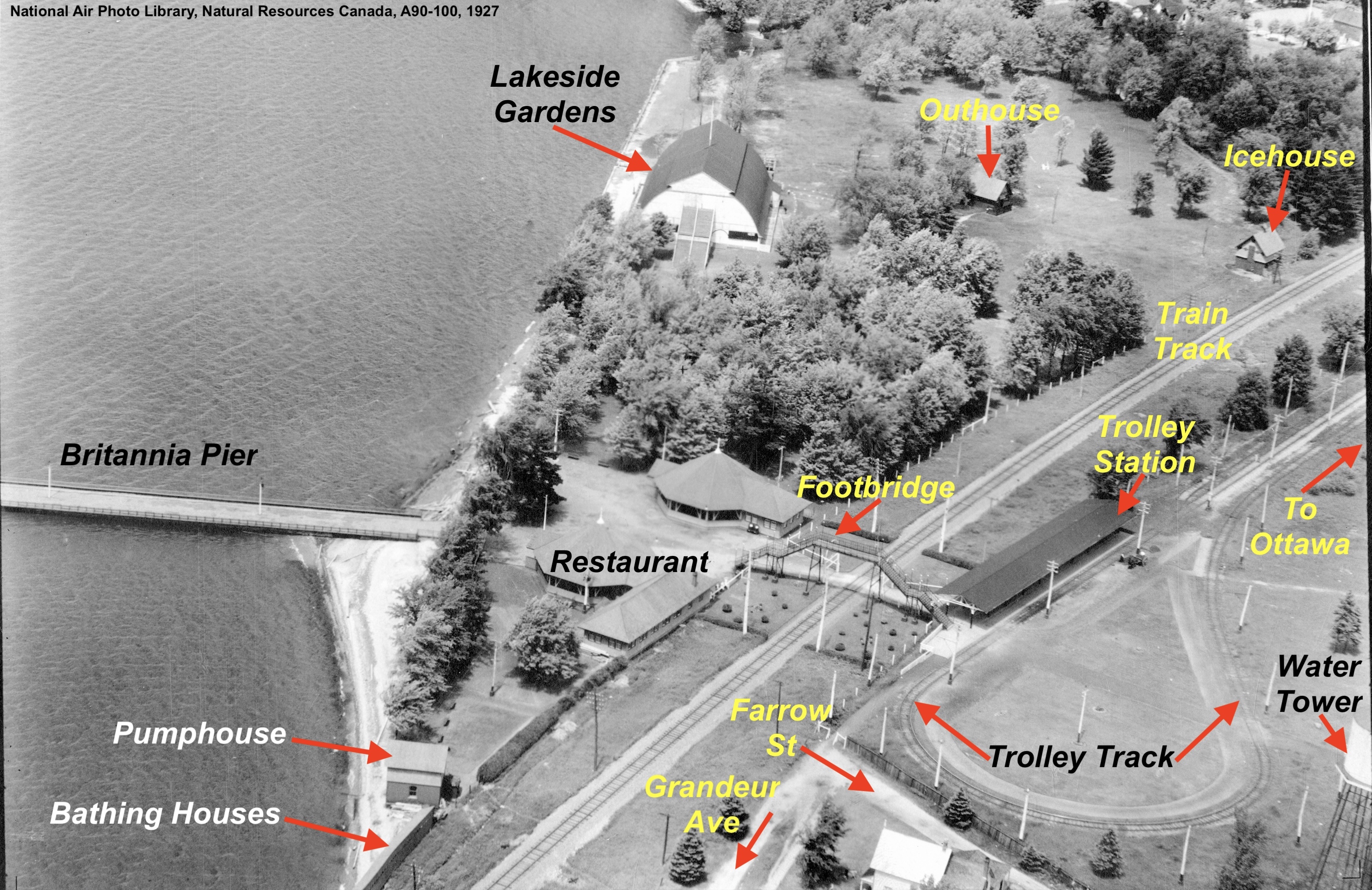
Both the train and the trolley brought visitors to the park. The Britannia trolley station was the last stop before the trolley entered the roundabout to return to Ottawa (1927).

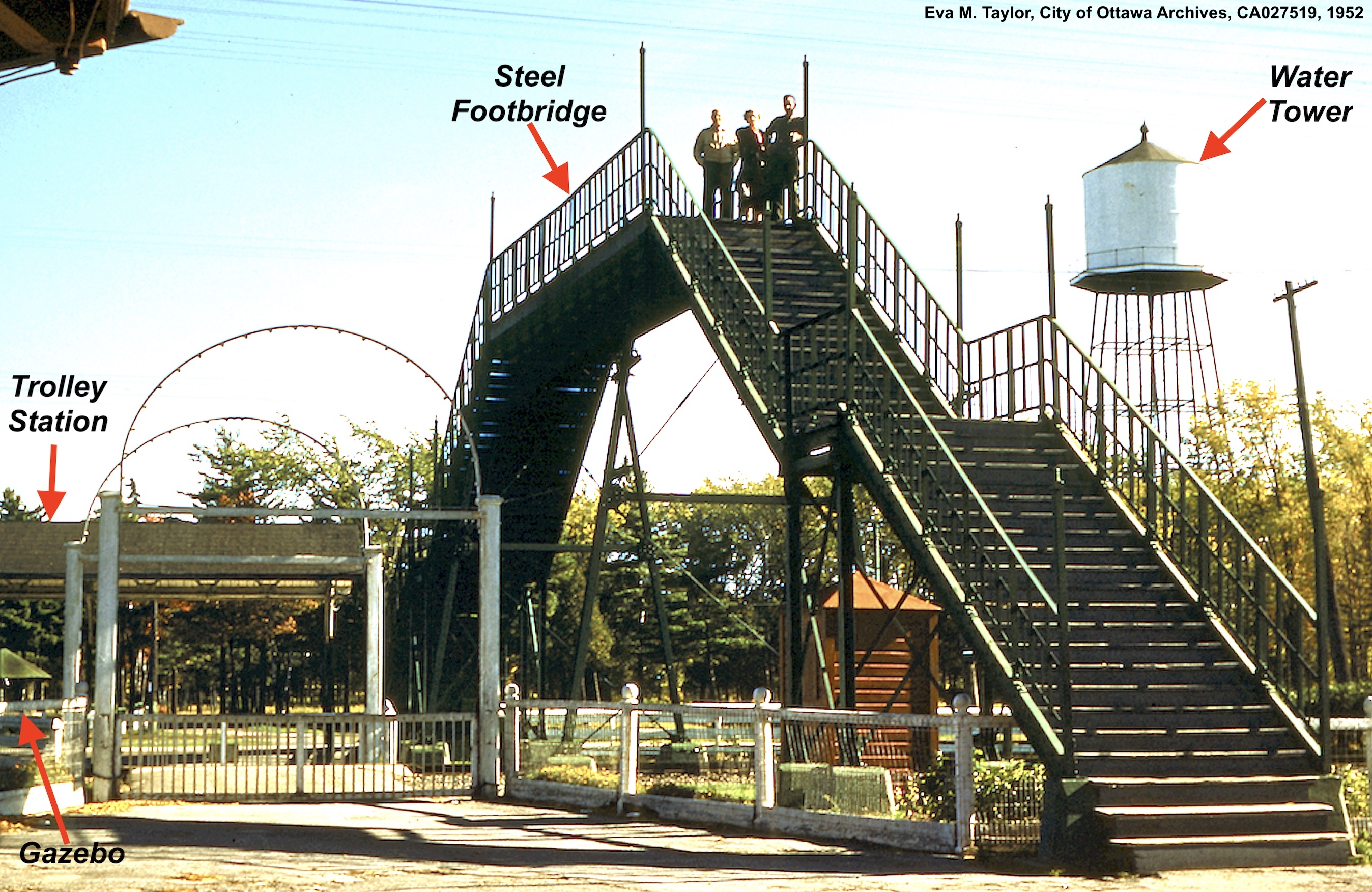
The footbridge allowed trolley passengers to safely cross the train tracks into the park; it was a major attraction for youngsters who ascended to view the approaching smoke-billowing trains (1952).

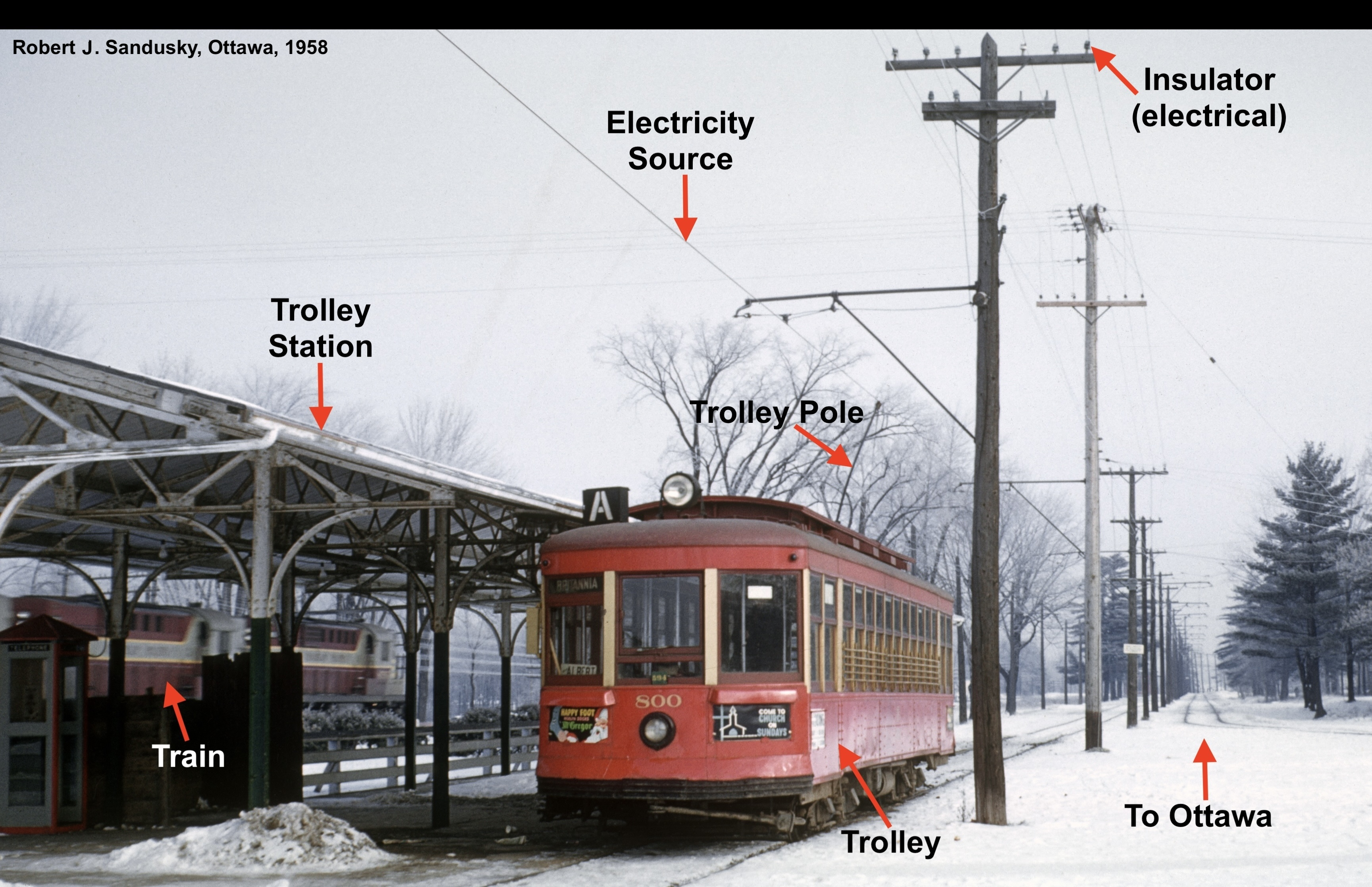
Trolley waiting at the Britannia trolley station alongside a locomotive. The train track evolved into the Trans Canada Trail. The park also had a mini train for children (1958).

The popularity of the Britannia Pier was due, in part, to changing norms regarding courtship. Promenading on the pier provided young women and men an acceptable venue for courtship, which at the time was conducted under strict social conventions. In the early 1900s, interactions between young people were often confined to more chaperoned settings such as the family home. Promenading often naturally led to more structured social interaction, such as attending dances at Lakeside Gardens. Jungfernstieg (maiden’s walk), an urban promenade in Hamburg, Germany, was another example of a socially acceptable venue for courtship.

Over time, the park facilities included the trolley station, a tall footbridge over the CPR railway tracks, 65 dressing rooms for swimmers in 2 pavilions, a merry-go-round, a miniature train, donkey rides, a 700-person auditorium (Lakeside Gardens), the wooden Britannia Pier complete with a wharf and three-story boating clubhouse, and a summer hotel at the intersection of Bradford and Rowatt. Moonlight excursions on the G.B. Greene, a 255 tonne/250 passenger riverboat were in high demand. Easily-accessible electric trolley service from Ottawa to Britannia Park at 7 cents a ride brought thousands of tourists per day during the summer months. Lakeside Gardens featured Sunday night concerts, drama night, films and dancing on Fridays and Saturdays supervised by the Kiwanis Club. As many as 8,000 per season attended these dances. Society's fascination with trains and trolleys during this era was evidenced by three separate rail systems operating in the park, whereas today there are none.

The slow demise of the "electric park" began when the G.B. Greene riverboat and the boat clubhouse on Britannia Pier burned in 1916 and 1918, respectively. The demise accelerated in the mid-1940s when widespread availability of automobiles allowed people to reach other entertainment destinations. The park was annexed by the City of Ottawa in 1951, and by 1955, much of its original infrastructure, including the long pier and Lakeside Gardens, had either rotted, burned or been demolished. The trolley line to the park was decommissioned in 1959. The train track was removed in 1967 and replaced in the early 70s by a bicycle path (i.e. the Trans Canada Trail). In a bygone era lasting some 60 years, the park had been the playground of eastern Ontario. Today, the park is simply known as Britannia Park, whereas the Britannia Amusement Park is listed in Closed Canadian Parks as one of 9 closed amusement parks that were built or nurtured by transportation companies.

=== Rural commuter town (1960–2000) ===
During this era, Britannia, and by association the village, garnered a reputation of being a rural commuter town. Although the village had been established in 1818, it was only annexed by the City of Ottawa in 1950, and therefore, did not receive city services until after that date. Even though the installation of sewers in Ottawa had begun in 1875, Britannia was only serviced in 1960; at that time, Britannia was notorious at Ottawa City Hall for sporting most of Ottawa's remaining 185 outhouses. Prior to the installation of water mains in the village, water had been provided for park facilities and for some paying village residences by two water towers, one installed privately by Gerald Jamieson (son of John Jamieson), and by wells and rain barrels. In 1959, a City of Ottawa survey showed that nearly half of the dwellings in the village were deemed to be in poor or very poor condition.

The long delay in the installation of sewers and water soiled the reputation of Britannia, including the village, and lowered land/house prices and taxes. This reduced living costs in the village and made it attractive to families that could not afford to live in Ottawa. Cheap fares on the trolley and later buses, allowed workers to readily commute from the village to Ottawa for work.

=== Revitalization (since 2000) ===
==== Flood proofing ====
From 2007 to 2018, the Britannia Village Community Association worked with the City of Ottawa and the Rideau Valley Conservation Authority to reduce the risk of flooding in the village. This involved the construction of berms, gates and a pump station designed to regulatory standards for flood proofing in Eastern Ontario (i.e. 1-in-100 year flood event). Even in the case of an extreme climate change event (i.e. 1-in-350 year flood), flood plain maps show that many residences in the village would not get floodwaters on their property.

==== Gentrification ====
Since about 2000, rapid gentrification has resulted in considerable renovation, demolition and construction of many elaborate residences in the village.

== Heritage buildings and architectural style ==
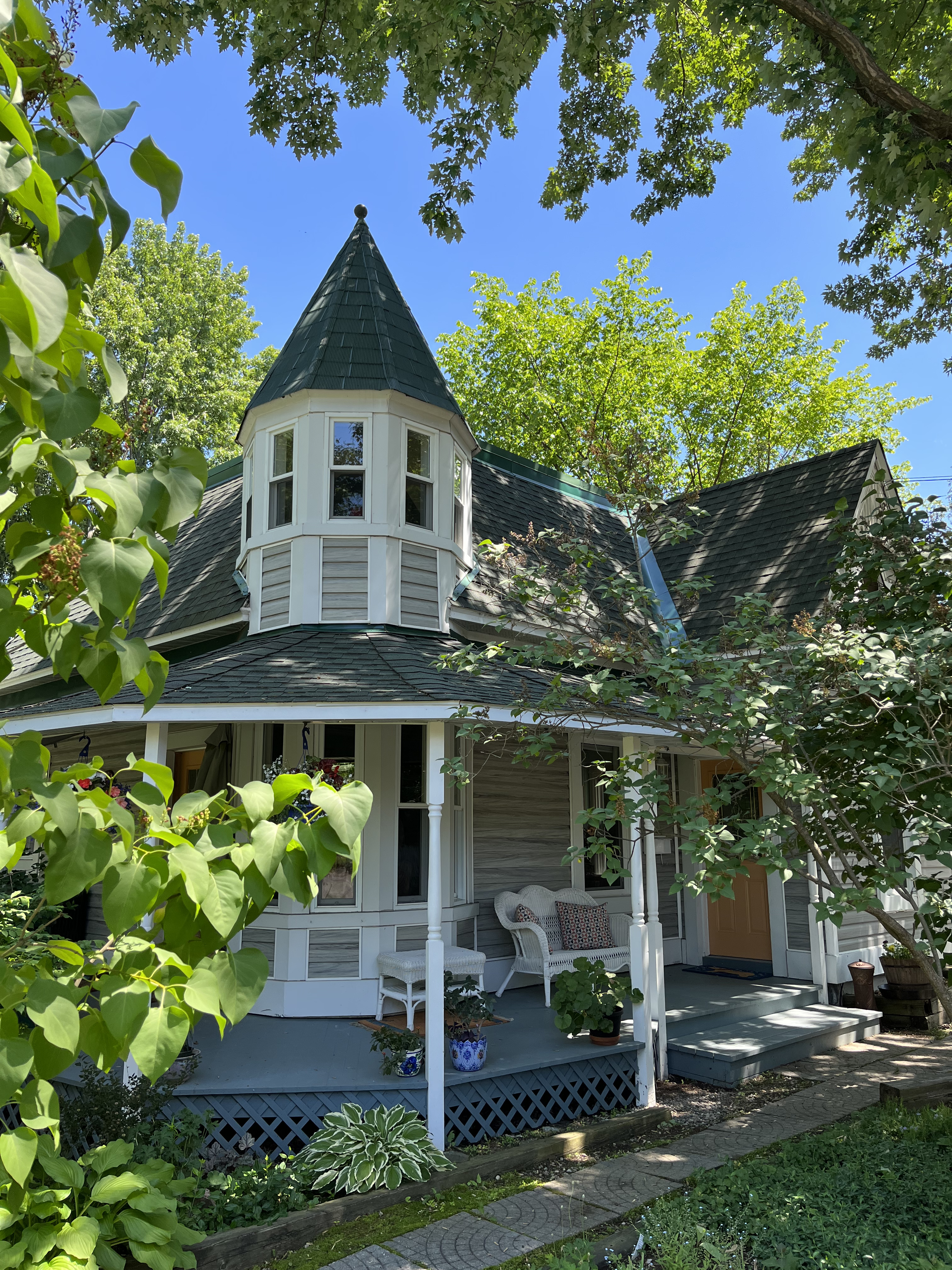
Heritage home built in 1907 showing large turret with conical roof, and large wrap-around verandah (Protected by Bylaw 2024–252)

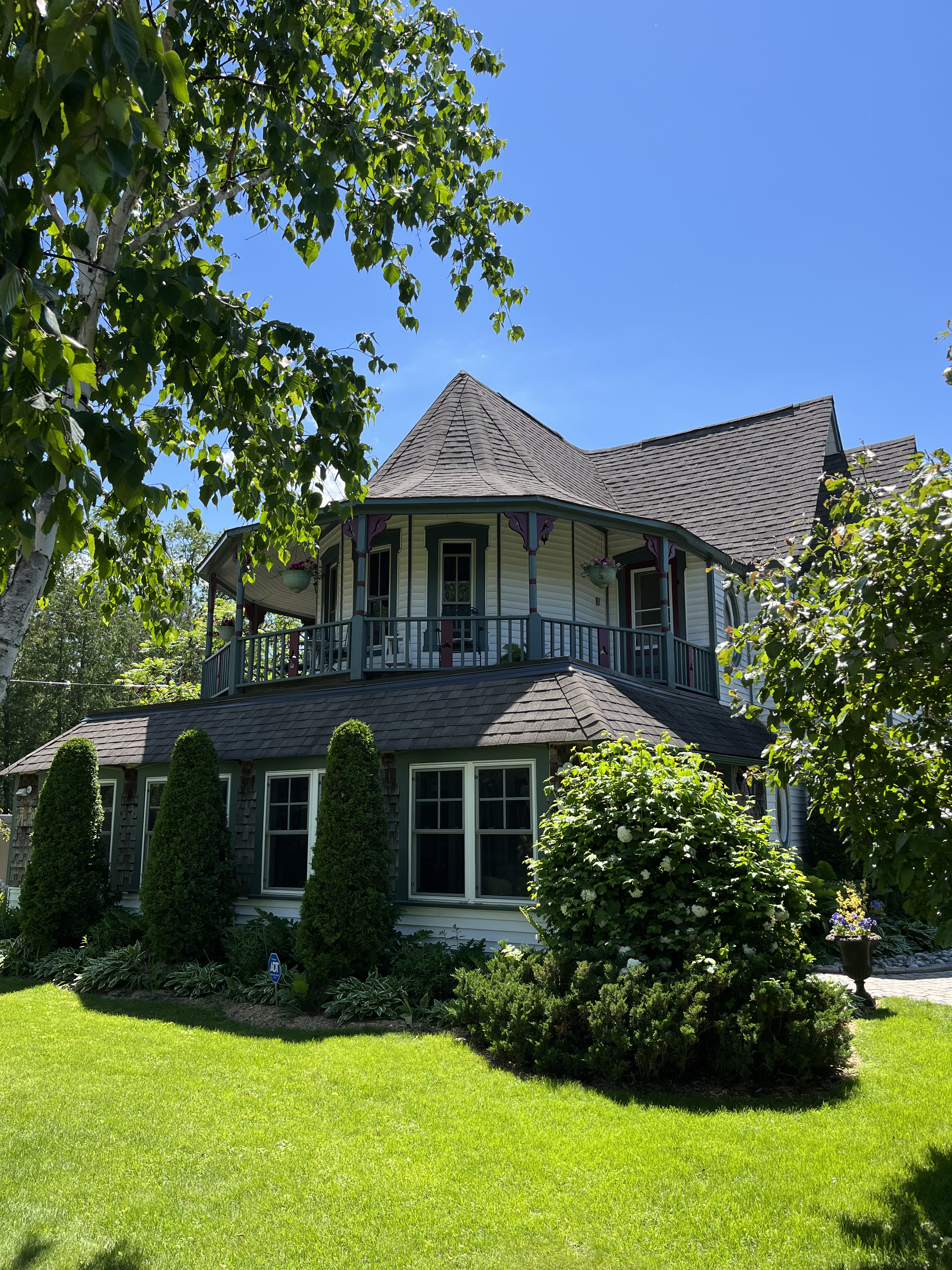
Heritage home built in 1895 showing 7-sided second storey porch with conical roof (Protected by Bylaw 237-95)

The village exhibits a large diversity of architectural styles since residences were built in a variety of eras; it was not developed as a planned community but rather as a cottage district which grew and developed over time. "Historic" Britannia Village is well represented by 31 buildings that the City of Ottawa has deemed to have heritage status, a designation applied to buildings of significant cultural heritage value; by comparison, Lincoln Heights and Belltown, which border the village, have a total of three combined. These heritage houses, often in vernacular architecture, usually have brick or wood siding including board-and-batten, clapboard or shiplap, and most were constructed in the late 1800s (14) and in the first decade of the 1900s (14). Many exhibit Queen Anne style architecture characterized by eclecticism, asymmetry, contrast and even excess.

During the 1960s and 1970s, the main architectural style of new housing was the flat-roofed duplex and some row housing. Many village duplexes were originally built in areas that were subsequently re-zoned to R10 (detached dwelling residential area) with the intent of preserving the heritage of the neighbourhood. Recently, in response to new Ontario legislation (Bill 23, More Homes Built Faster Act, 2022), the City of Ottawa has released (May 31, 2024) a discussion document regarding new zoning by-law provisions, and an address-searchable zoning map.

=== Addresses of buildings with heritage status ===
Since 1975, the Ontario Heritage Act, has enabled the City of Ottawa to protect heritage sites, districts, marine heritage sites and archaeological resources. Until recently, only seven heritage properties had been designated in the village. However, in 2024, prompted by Ontario's Bill 23, seven more properties in the village were designated as heritage properties, including the Britannia Yacht Club. This action created some controversy when some owners objected claiming that their properties were dilapidated beyond repair or that the heritage designation limited their options in the future. The justification (cultural and architectural) for heritage designation of these seven properties is included in a 15-min-video presentation to the city's Built Heritage Committee.

The village has two types of heritage buildings that are protected under the Ontario Heritage Act:

A) Protected by "Individual Designation under Part IV of the Ontario Heritage Act (Ontario Regulation 9/06)". Alterations, additions or partial demolition of these properties require a heritage permit from the City of Ottawa. In corresponding order, the following 14 properties are protected individually by Bylaws# 20–97, 2024–311, 2024–252, 169–94, 09–94, 2024–253, 20–97, 237–95, 20–97, 196–01, 2024–254, 2024–255, 2024–256, 2024–257:

- Bradford St: 66 (Rowatt House), 84 (Arbour House) 119, 205
- Britannia Rd: 48 (1st post office), 73, 127 (William Murphy House), 154, 175 (a Murphy Brothers' Cottage), 181 (St. Stephen's Anglican Church)
- Kirby Rd: 95 (The Gables)
- Rowatt St: 2764 (Jamieson House), 2775
- Cassels St: 2777 (Britannia Yacht Club)

Statements of the cultural and architectural heritage value of these protected properties are available. Additionally, the BVCA has created a follow-along walking tour of all designated heritage properties in the village. The tour includes a description of cultural attributes of each property in addition to photographs highlighting architectural attributes. The lexicon describing architectural attributes was adopted from Ontario and American sources.

B) Interim Protection under Section 27 (1.2) of the Ontario Heritage Act. There are no restrictions on alterations to properties listed on the Heritage Register. Owners must provide the City of Ottawa with 60 days' notice of intent to demolish or remove a building.

- Britannia Rd: 63, 90, 141, 190–192, 195, 220, 229, 230, 236, 240, 238A-238B
- Bradford St: 54, 64, 155, 195
- Cassels St: 2780
- Rowatt St: 2748

=== Heritage attributes in modern residences ===
The BVCA, architects like John Riordan, and previously the Britannia Village Advocacy (1996), have tried to preserve the eclectic character of the village by encouraging the incorporation of heritage attributes into new structures and renovations, as shown below.

Village Heritage Attributes
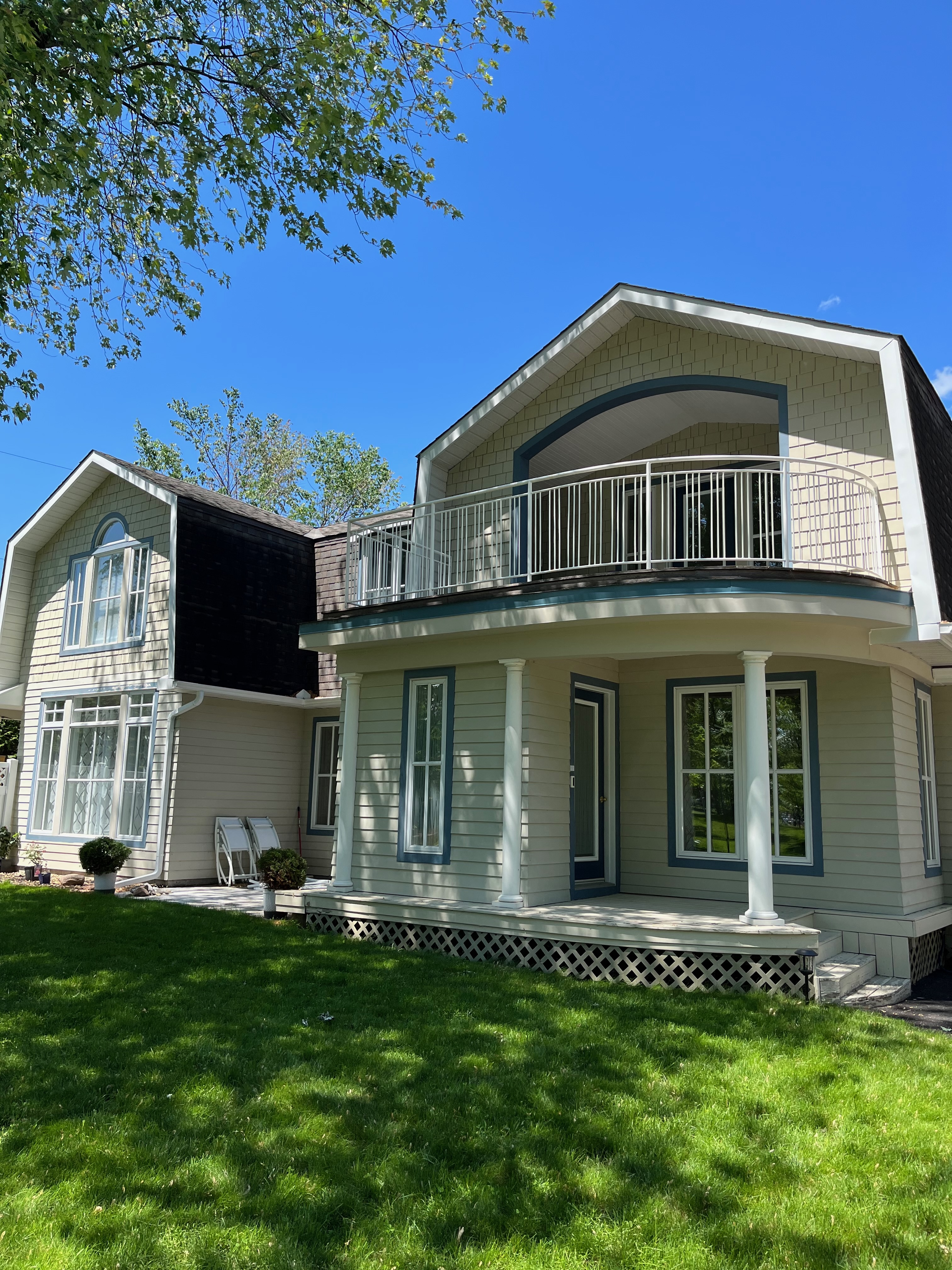
a) Arched, inset upper balcony, b) Front verandah (built, 1982)

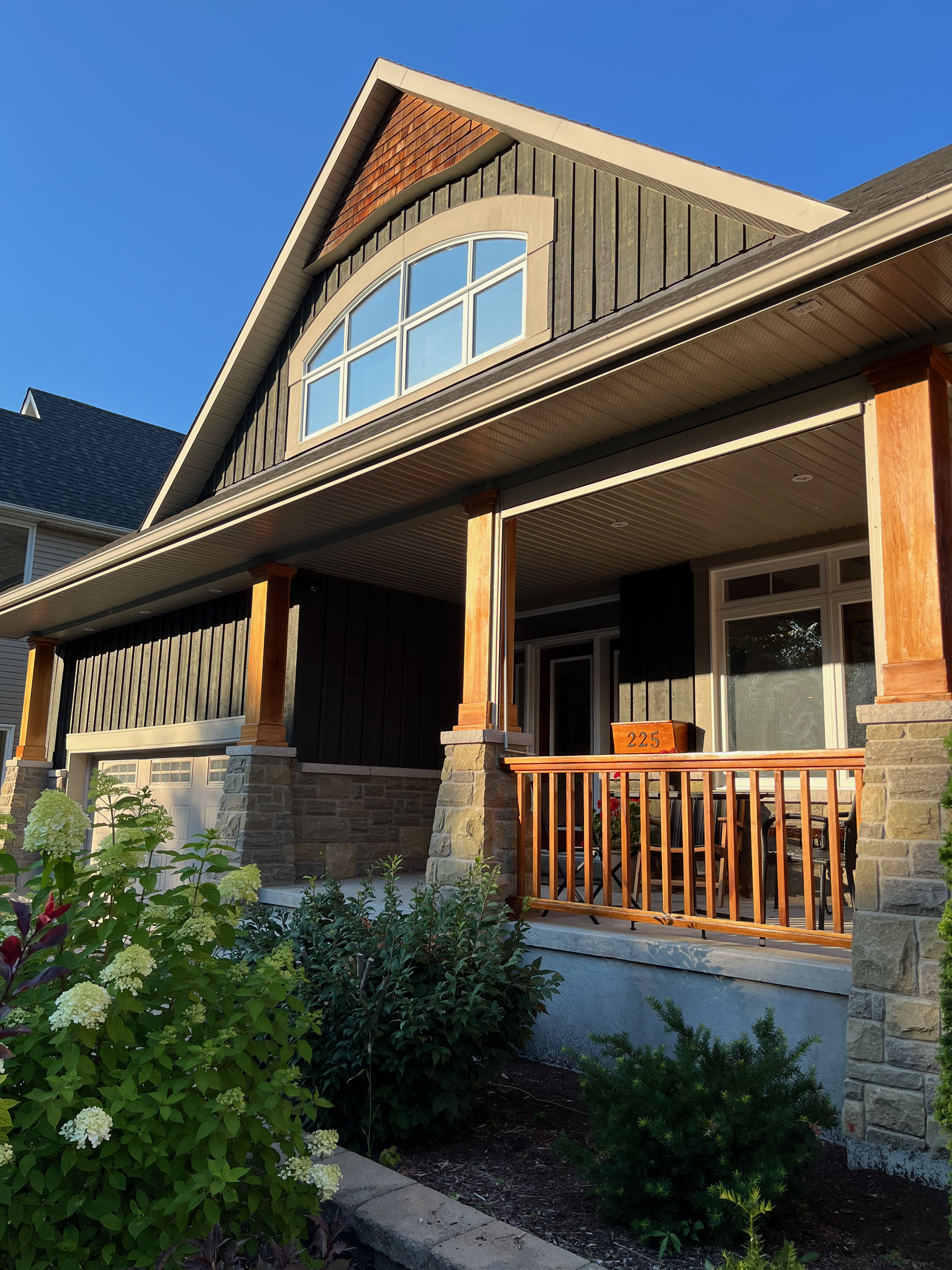
a) Board-and-Batten siding, b) Square-post ornamentation, c) Shingle-style, gable apex ornamentation, d) Front verandah (built, 2006)

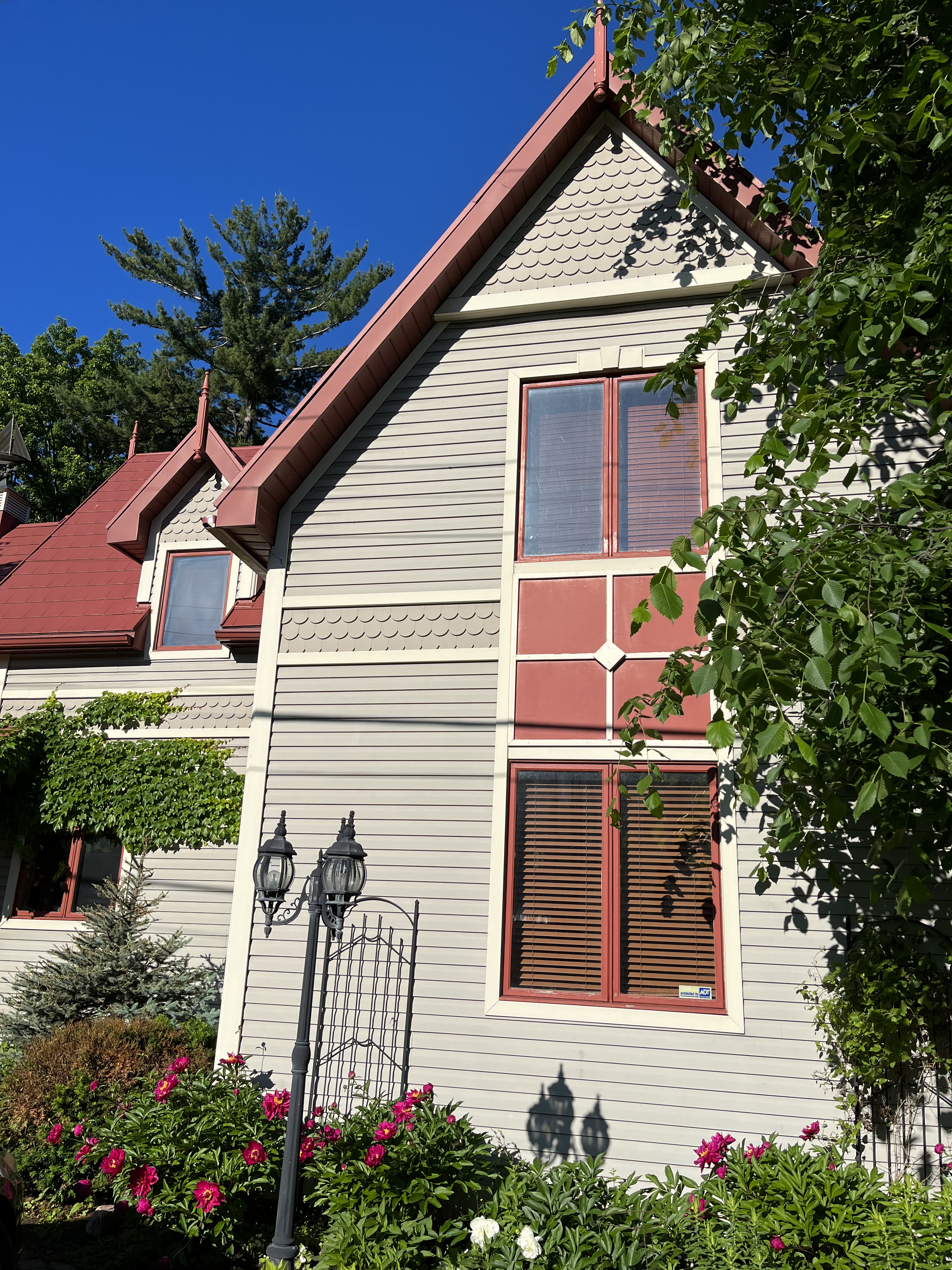
a) Scalloped ornamentation on gable apex, b) Vertical windows, c) Steep roofs, d) Spires

The most iconic village heritage attribute featured in several village residences is probably the semi-circular, inset upper balcony which is also featured on the top of the Britannia Village sign. Although this heritage attribute is relatively uncommon, it does exist elsewhere. The City of Ottawa heritage plaque at 175 Britannia Road describes this architectural style as a Murphy Brothers' Cottage. Access to fresh air through the incorporation of verandas and balconies featured prominently in late 1800 and early 1900 architecture.

== Character ==
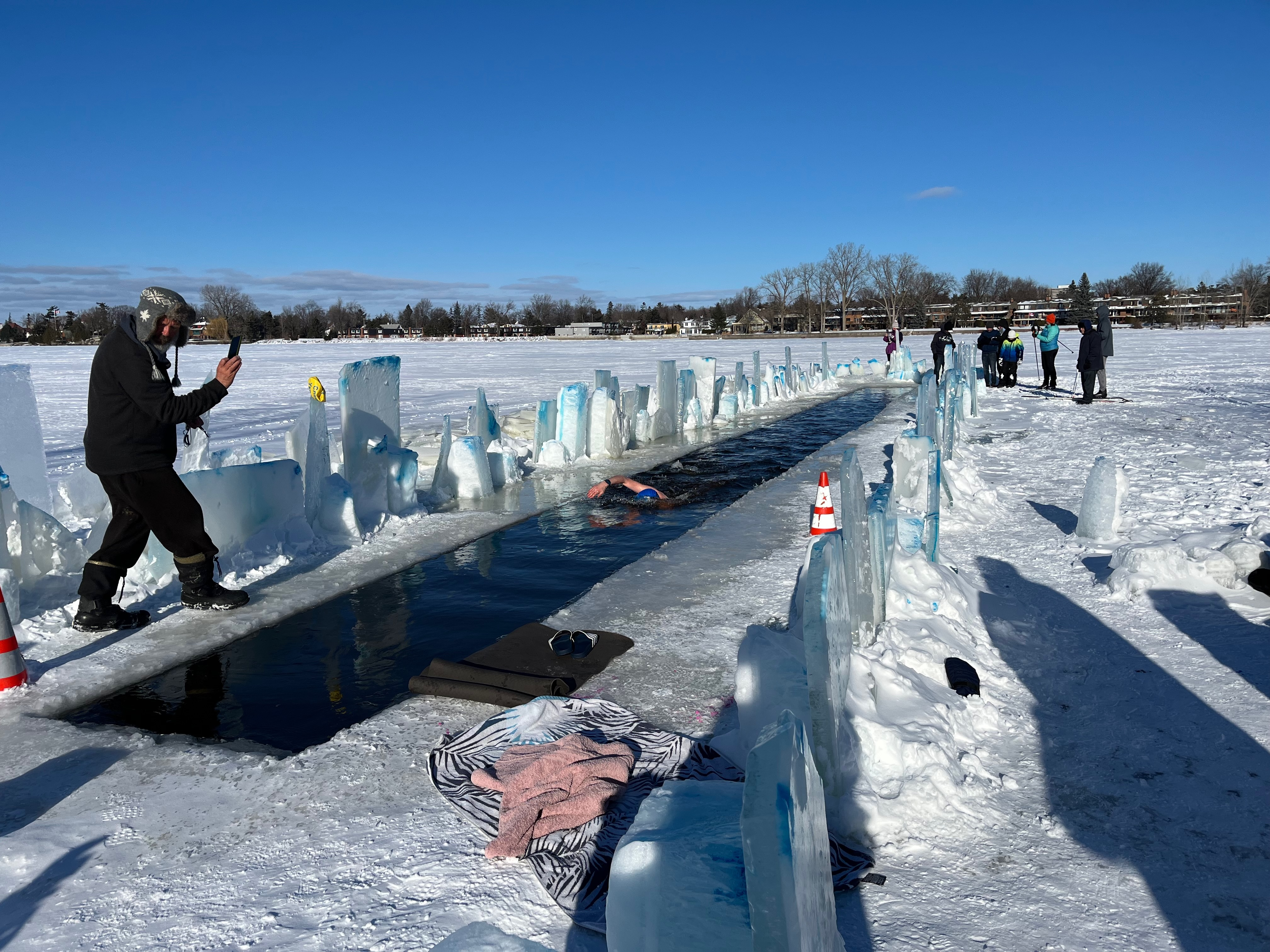
Ice swimmer in a 25-metre ice pool with the village in the background. Blue-dyed sheets of ice around the perimeter alert passers-by of danger.

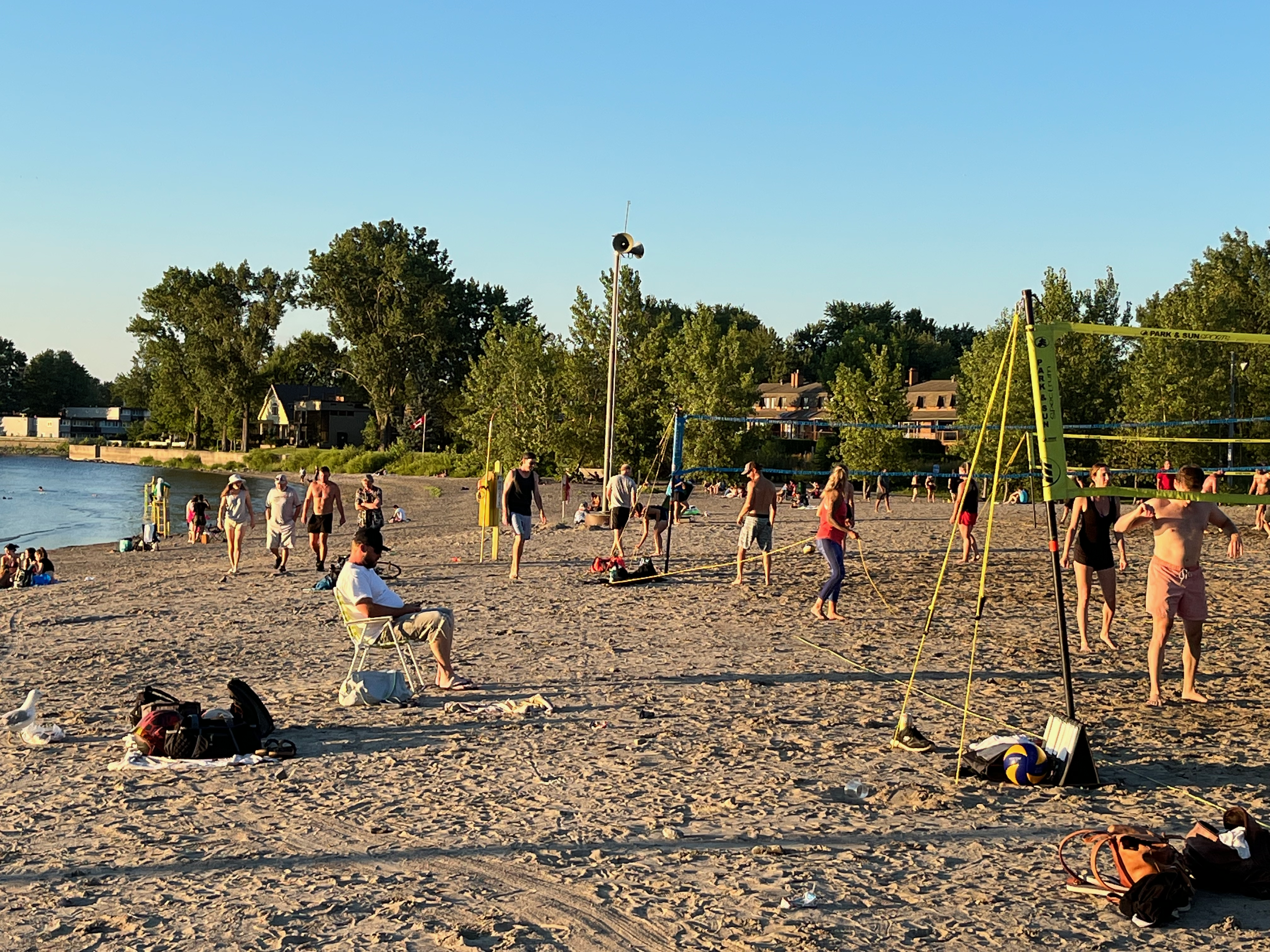
Summer view of the village from Britannia Beach

The village is at the centre of a recreational hub with boating at the Britannia Yacht Club, hiking in Mud Lake, cycling on the Trans Canada Trail, beach volleyball, summer and winter swimming, kitesurfing, fishing and picnicking at Britannia Park. Consequently, many villagers are focused on the outdoors. In the winter, villagers are increasingly using the recently created (2019) Britannia Winter Trail for cross-country skiing, walking and winter biking. Bird watching is also popular in the village because adjacent Mud Lake is in a major migratory corridor that is recognized as one of the most popular urban sites for bird watching in Canada.

Annual village events include the Britannia Village Community Arts Crawl celebrating local artists and musicians, a fall fundraising/social event, garage sale, Jane's Walk of the historic area and regular house potluck dinners. The Bring-on-the-Bay 3 km and 1.5 km open-water swim from the Nepean Sailing Club to the Britannia Yacht Club hosts some 800 swimmers annually. Ottawa’s 2026 New Year’s Day plunge into a 25-meter lane carved out of the ice at Britannia beach attracted some 250 participants.

The annual Ironman Canada event will be held in Ottawa in 2026 and 2027, with the 3.8 km swim loop running parallel to the village in Lac Deschênes.

== Notables in the community ==
- Captain John Le Breton (1779–1848). War hero; lumber baron; land developer (Lebreton Flats)
- Ezekiel Stone Wiggins (1839–1910). Controversial international weather and earthquake predictor; author and professor
- Thomas Ahearn (1855–1938). Founder of Ottawa Electric Railway Co and Britannia Amusement Park; inventor and office holder
- Captain Thomas G. Fuller (1908–1994). War hero (Pirate of the Adriatic); founder of Thomas Fuller Construction
- Bruce Kirby CM (1929–2021). Sailboat designer including the Laser, and an Olympian
- Larry O’Brien (born 1949). 58th mayor of Ottawa (2006–2010); founder/CEO Calian Technologies Ltd.
- Sheila Copps CM (born 1952). First woman Deputy Prime Minister of Canada, 1993–1997
- Kevin Page (born 1957). First Parliamentary Budget Officer for Canada, 2008–2013
- Richard Reed Parry (born 1977). Core member of the Grammy Award-winning indie rock band Arcade Fire

== Databases (address-searchable) ==
=== City of Ottawa (Google Chrome recommended) ===
- 1-in-100 year flood plain map
- 1-in-350 year flood plain map (extreme climate event)
- Description of designated heritage properties
- Properties on the heritage register
- Zoning Bylaw - Interactive Map
