= CGY =

CGY may refer to:

- Calgary, Alberta, Canada
- Laguindingan Airport, serving Cagayan de Oro, Mindanao, Philippines, IATA airport code CGY
- Changanasseri railway station, in Kottayam District, Kerala, India, station code CGY
- Centigray (cGy), a derived unit of ionizing radiation dose
- Calian, a Canadian company traded on the Toronto Stock Exchange
