= Larry O'Brien (Canadian politician) =

Canadian politician

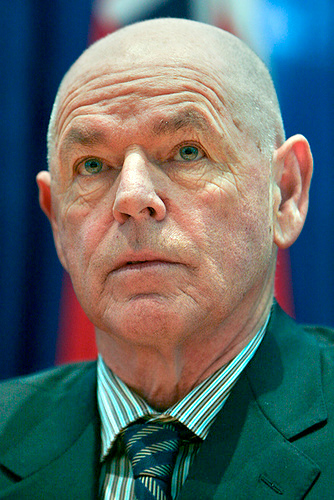
- O'Brien in 2007

58th Mayor of Ottawa
- In office December 1, 2006 – November 30, 2010
- Preceded by: Bob Chiarelli
- Succeeded by: Jim Watson

Personal details
- Born: Lawrence Robert O'Brien; July 19, 1949 (age 76) Ottawa, Ontario, Canada
- Party: Liberal; Canadian Alliance; Conservative (by 2006)
- Spouses: Debbie Green (m. 1983–1995) Colleen McBride (m. 2008)
- Children: Michael O'Brien; Matthew O'Brien

Lawrence Robert O'Brien (born July 19, 1949) is a Canadian businessman and former politician. O'Brien served as the 58th mayor of Ottawa from 2006 until 2010. He ran for re-election in the Ottawa mayoral election in 2010 but was defeated by then former mayor Jim Watson. O'Brien was the founder and former Chair and CEO of Calian Technologies Ltd.

== Background ==
O'Brien attended Elmdale Public School and Fisher Park High School, and graduated from Merivale High School in 1968. He studied at Algonquin College and graduated with a diploma in Technology in 1972. After graduating, O'Brien worked in the high technology sector, where he met Terry Matthews and Michael Cowpland. He then joined Microsystems International Ltd. In 1975 he worked for the Communications Research Centre and Motorola Communications. O'Brien then launched his first company, Insta-Call Ltd., which went bankrupt in 1979. From then to 1982, he was the general manager of reliability-testing firm Reltek Inc. in Kanata, subsequently leaving to open Calian Technologies Ltd., a staffing (outsourcing) and engineering service provider.

O'Brien left Calian as CEO and chairman in 2006 when he was elected mayor of Ottawa. He remained a director of the firm until stepping down in 2012.

== 2006 Ottawa mayoral race ==
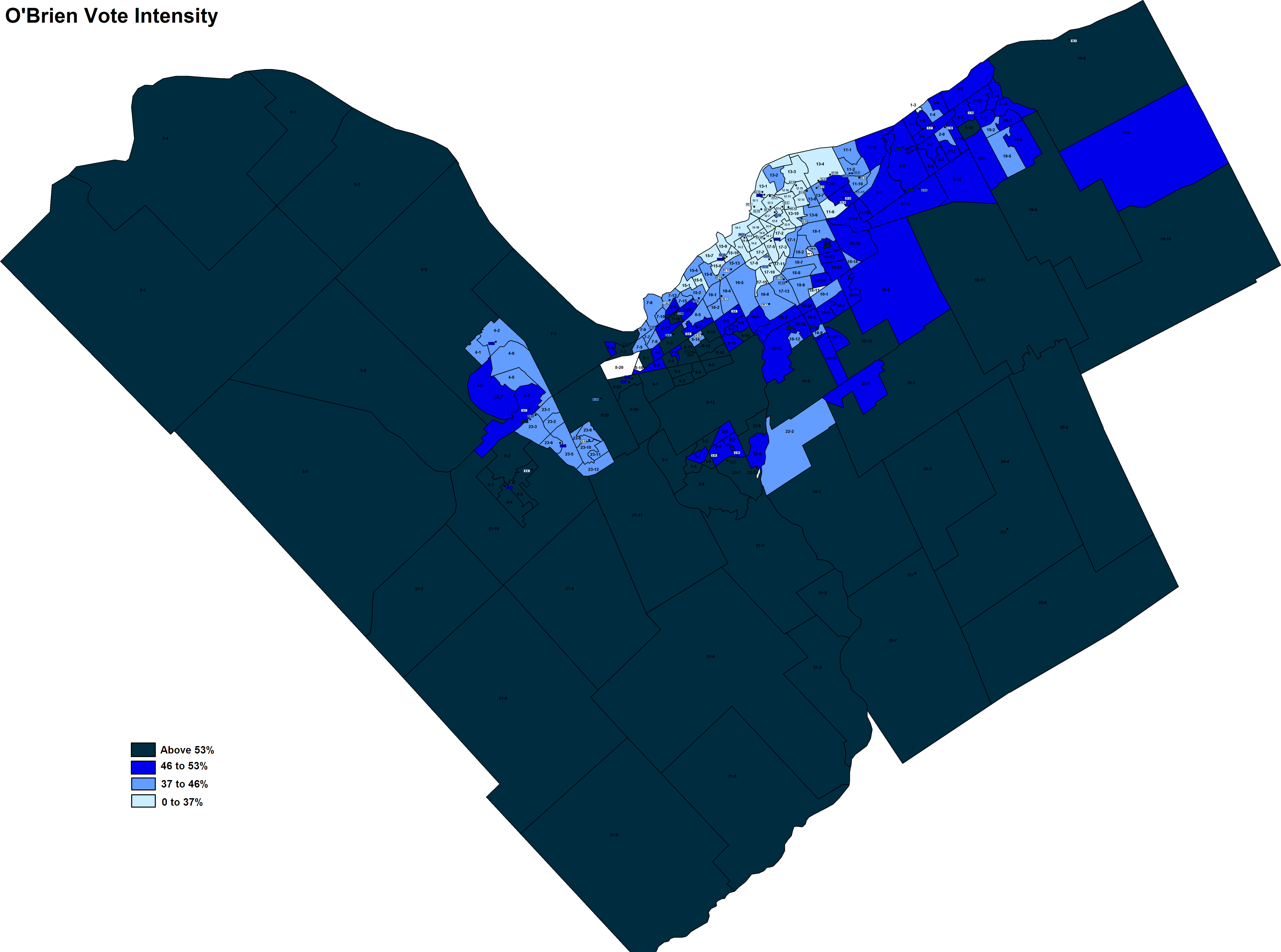
The distribution of O'Brien vote in the 2006 election. He did best in the rural areas and the outer suburbs.

In July 2006, O'Brien announced he would be running for the office of mayor of Ottawa in the 2006 municipal election, calling himself a centrist candidate.

One of the central points of his platform was a review of Ottawa's O-Train light rail expansion plans, with a plan to delay or even eliminate the full contract. He was critical of what he saw as secrecy of some of the elements of the project, as well as the effects the construction would have in areas such as the Albert and Slater street corridors, and the removal of some of the existing express bus services. In September 2006, O'Brien wrote a letter to the federal President of the Treasury Board, John Baird, requesting a formal review of the project. Baird then withheld the $200 million federal funding for the expansion plans until after the 2006 election in November.

During a candidates' debate on September 13, O'Brien stated that one solution to the problem of homeless youth sleeping under a bridge was to replace them with a tourist kiosk. He also said homelessness could be solved through a "business-like look." These statements led to criticism from other candidates for mayor, including Alex Munter and Jane Scharf.

O'Brien promised to freeze municipal taxes over the next four years and make the city's finances more fiscally responsible. However, it was expected that the budget would rise close to $95 million over the next year, sparking debate as to which public services would experience a rise in user-fees and which services would be cancelled. O'Brien also promised tougher policy on safety issues such as violent crime and drug issues, and promised to increase the number of police officers. O'Brien's other campaign commitments on law and order included his promise to eliminate the city's free crack pipe program. He also proposed introducing a by-law preventing people from sleeping in public places based on the Montreal by-law introduced in September 2006.

O'Brien said that he was in favour of the planned expansion of the Ottawa Congress Centre, which was halted by the City of Ottawa and the Ontario Government. The Congress Centre project was fully funded in the first three months of his term as Mayor.

He proposed making Ottawa a green leader in waste-to-energy production by generating 5% of the city's electricity from waste and diverting 100% of the city's non-recycled waste from landfills; for example, Carp Road landfill site, which Waste Management had planned to double in size, would be replaced by three waste-to-energy facilities.

Before officially entering the mayoral race, O'Brien was polling in third place with little support. However, when Terry Kilrea dropped out of the race in order to pursue a council spot, most of Kilrea's supporters began to support O'Brien. He climbed to second place in the polls, ahead of incumbent Bob Chiarelli, then moved to first place ahead of challenger Alex Munter in an Ottawa Citizen poll a few days before the election. In the municipal election on November 13, 2006, O'Brien won 47% of the vote and became mayor-elect of Ottawa with a margin of 30,000 votes ahead of Munter. He subsequently stepped down as CEO and chairman of Calian while remaining a director for the company.

== Mayoral term (2006–2010) ==
=== Municipal budgets ===
==== 2007 budget ====
During the week of December 18, the City of Ottawa reported that it could face a 105-million dollar shortfall on the 2007 budget, equivalent to an 11% tax increase. During the Ottawa mayoral campaign, O'Brien had promised a no-tax hike policy; however, due to a larger shortfall than anticipated, he said that he could not guarantee no tax increases.

During the 2007 budget discussions from January 8 to 12, 2007, O'Brien voted against a passed motion that would have required city staff to implement two draft budgets, including one with a tax freeze and another with a tax increase within the rate of inflation. After several budget meetings, O'Brien criticized several councillors for supporting a tax increase within the rate of inflation and for not taking the procedures seriously. Councillors later replied that O'Brien's comments do not improve the relations between the mayor and the City Council. On February 26, 2007, news sources reported that the City, while recuperating surplus and reserve funds and raising various user fees, would not increase property taxes that year.

==== 2008 budget ====
In August 2007, the City was facing a significant budget shortfall of over $80 million for the year 2008. Despite his previous support for a tax freeze, O'Brien proposed a 2% tax-levy until 2010 for infrastructure projects, which would give an additional $180 million in revenues to the City. He also presented a motion by which he would acquire more municipal responsibilities, such as city contracts and hiring, in an attempt to improve control of city expenses, which had increased rapidly since the 2001 amalgamation, and later presented a financial plan including measures proposed to make the city more cost-effective by finding administrative cost savings and by selling Hydro Ottawa. City staff mentioned that a tax freeze would have resulted in the closing of several community centres, 9 public libraries, fire stations, daycare centers, skating arenas and swimming pools as well as major cuts to transit service and a significant transit fare increase.

The budget was approved unanimously by the Council and resulted in a 4.9% tax increase, including 1.4% for the police force budget, 2% for the infrastructure levy and 1.5% for capital and operation costs. The budget also included a 7.5% OC Transpo fare increase until 2010, user fee increases such as rents and parking spaces, and cost cuts. O'Brien and much of the Council had stated prior to the budget talks that cuts to essential services such as community centers, libraries and transit were unacceptable.

==== 2009 budget ====
For the 2009 budget, the City faced a $35 million budget shortfall. Proposals to combat the shortfall included a 4.9% tax increase and cuts to as many as 230 jobs, 700 daycare spaces, $4 million in arts program, and transit service. Following budget discussions, the budget was passed on December 9 on an omnibus motion from councillor Rick Chiarelli. The budget resulted in a 4.9% tax increase and the deferral of some spending items, without the proposed arts and transit cuts. O'Brien had criticized the budget, calling it a "travesty" and saying, "What I saw this afternoon was simply disgusting. They acted out of fear, not leadership". The budget process occurred at the same time a 52-day transit strike at OC Transpo began.

=== Transformation campaign ===
On April 18, 2007, O'Brien launched a 1,000-day transformation campaign in which he reviewed how the city's services were made, along with how the decisions were made at City Hall. "Transformation" was the fourth part of his "T-plan," which also included taxes, transit and trash. He also planned several meetings in the following weeks outside City Hall. His strategy was met with concern by several councilors, organizations, and other prominent political figures, with former mayor Marion Dewar insisting on a degree of public consultation.

=== Snow removal debate ===
During the 2007–08 winter season, the city received 437 centimetres of snow, making it the second snowiest winter on record. The heavy snowfall caused a major budget shortfall for snow removal operations, with some cost estimates as high as $23 million. Following snow storms which caused one metre of snow in one week in early March, O'Brien proposed a one-time tax levy of $50 per household in order to balance the budget. As it opted for eliminating the deficit by using provincial infrastructure funding announced in the 2008 budget and money from the sale of Telecom Ottawa, the proposal was met with heavy opposition from many citizens and councillors, and it was defeated during a City Council meeting on March 26, 2008 .

=== Transit ===
==== Light-rail expansion debate ====
In his first week in office, O'Brien changed his position concerning the O-Train project due to an Ottawa Sun report that, were the project cancelled, there could be lawsuits from Siemens totaling up to $1 billion. O'Brien said that he preferred to cancel only the downtown section, not the entire. On December 6, Ottawa Council voted 12–11 in favour of expanding the O-Train, except the section that would travel through downtown, while adding an environmental assessment that would study the possibility of building tunnels beneath Albert and Slater streets. O'Brien added that the money saved on the north-south line would be invested on developing the Transitway in suburban areas. On December 13, he withdrew his support for the revised plan because the $400 million funding by both the provincial and federal governments would not be returned before the contract deadline of December 15. O'Brien added that the City's signing the contract would be a risk. A new vote was held on December 14 in which the Council voted to cancel the project by a margin of 13–11, with O'Brien and Rainer Bloess, who had been absent in the previous vote, casting the additional votes against the project.

==== Transportation Task Force ====
On January 19, 2007, O'Brien created a new Transportation Task Force committee, led by former Liberal Cabinet Minister David Collenette, which was commissioned to review the city's transit issues and issue recommendations.

==== New transit plan ====
On November 28, 2007, while facing a $280 million lawsuit from Siemens, the contractor for the original north-south project, the City Council approved a new transit plan worth just under $2 billion. The transit plan included completion of the current Transitway, expansion of light rail service to Riverside South, a new transit corridor for Cumberland, and a new downtown tunnel; an environmental assessment study would determine whether the tunnel would be used for light-rail or buses. It has not yet been determined how this plan will be funded. A first phase with light-rail from Tunney's Pasture to Blair Station via a downtown tunnel was approved in November 2008. A future section near Westboro requires more studies due to concerns by the National Capital Commission and area residents on using light-rail on the Kichi Zibi Mikan.

==== OC Transpo strike ====
On December 10, 2008, OC Transpo drivers and mechanics started a 52-day strike. The strike ended on January 31, 2009, after federal Labour Minister Rona Ambrose announced her intention to introduce back-to-work-legislation following several breakdowns of talks between the Amalgamated Transit Union, the City of Ottawa, and a federal mediator. The strike happened during the 2008–2009 Canadian parliamentary dispute, which may have prolonged the strike without risk of federally mandated resolution. The parties agreed to send the dispute issues, such as sick days, work-rest rules and other benefits, to binding arbitration.

=== Controversies ===
In his first week of office, O'Brien came under attack for supporting a raise in his salary from $140,000 to $172,000, despite O'Brien's campaign platform of strict fiscal prudence. After controversy, O'Brien reversed his position on the matter and declined the pay raise two days later.

On February 10, 2007, the Ottawa Citizen reported sworn allegations from Terry Kilrea, who had dropped out of the mayoral race on August 30, 2006, that O'Brien had met with Kilrea twice and offered him a financial inducement of up to $30,000 and a political appointment on the condition that Kilrea withdraw from the race and support O'Brien. O'Brien had been under investigation for bribery by the OPP since March 27, 2008, in connection with the allegations. The Ottawa Citizen reported that Terry Kilrea sent correspondence to the federal Minister of the Environment John Baird, concerning a possible appointment if Kilrea dropped out of the mayoral race. On December 10, 2007, the OPP charged O'Brien for two offenses under the Criminal Code of Canada. O'Brien temporarily stepped down during the trial; councillor Michel Bellemare served as acting mayor for two months. O'Brien contested the charges in court and on August 5, 2009, both charges against him were dismissed by Justice Douglas Cunningham, associate chief justice of Ontario’s Superior Court.

== 2010 Ottawa mayoral race ==
In March 2010, O'Brien stated reluctance to run in Ottawa's 2010 mayoral election, citing that he accomplished most of his mayoral objectives in his first term. However, on June 30, 2010, he officially announced his intention to run for mayor in the 2010 election.

O'Brien officially launched his campaign on September 8, 2010. O'Brien's campaign slogan was "Action over Politics", a deliberate contrast of O'Brien to main rival Jim Watson's extensive political career. O'Brien's campaign also announced that they would forgo the traditional lawn-signs in the campaign for a more "modern" approach. Another campaign theme for the O'Brien re-election bid was that the mayor has only one vote (on city council) while citizens have two (one for mayor and one for their local councillor). The Ottawa Sun reported that O'Brien noted that in order to implement his agenda, he needs "councillors who think like him around the [council] table"

O'Brien was largely critical of the Council for tax increases during his tenure as mayor. O'Brien's platform stated that he wanted to "give the Mayor, rather than staff, the authority to bring forward the city’s budget plan for debate." O'Brien continued to set "zero" as a target for annual property tax increases.

O'Brien finished second to Watson in the election, garnering 24.06% of the vote.

== Personal life ==
O'Brien married Debbie Green in 1983. They had two sons, Michael and Matthew. In 1995, O'Brien and Green divorced. In 2008, O'Brien married real estate agent Colleen McBride.
