= Calian =

Ottawa-based consulting firm

Calian Group Ltd.
- Formerly: Calian Technologies Ltd. (until 2016)
- Type: Public company
- Traded as: TSX: CGY
- Industry: Technology Services, Health Services, Training Services, Systems Engineering and Manufacturing
- Founded: September 27, 1982
- Founder: Larry O'Brien
- Headquarters: 770 Palladium Drive; Ottawa, Ontario; K2V 1C8
- Key people: Kevin Ford, President and CEO; Patrick Houston, CFO
- Revenue: 571 millions $ US (2025)
- Operating income: 78 millions $ US (2025)
- Net income: 52 millions $ US (2025)
- Number of employees: 6 100 employees (2025)

Calian Group Ltd. is a Canadian company that was founded in 1982 as an Ottawa-based consulting firm. The company went public in 1993 and is traded on the Toronto Stock Exchange (TSX) under the symbol CGY (formerly CTY).

The company's capabilities include the provision of health, training, engineering and IT services to private and public sector organizations as well as the design, manufacturing and maintenance of complex systems for the communications and defence sectors.

== History ==
Calian Technologies Ltd. was founded by Larry O'Brien in 1982. It has since grown from a one-person, Ottawa-based consulting firm focused on providing quality-assurance technology consulting services, to a $659M (2023) public and private-sector professional services provider.

The company went public in 1993 after the acquisition of SED Systems of Saskatoon.

Ray Basler took over the position of CEO of the company when Larry O'Brien retired from the company in February 2005. O'Brien became Mayor of Ottawa in 2006 but remained on Calian's Board of Directors until 2012.

Kevin Ford succeeded Ray Basler as Calian's President and CEO in 2015. Ford was named CEO of the Year by the Ottawa Business Journal and Ottawa Chamber of Commerce in 2017.

== Acquisitions ==
- Miller Communications Systems Ltd., 1988
- Incorporation of Calian (U.S.) Ltd., 1989
- Acquisition of SED Systems Inc., 1990
- Acquisition of Skywave, 1993
- Acquisition of Pricon Staffing Services, 1996
- Acquisition of HST, 1998
- Acquisition of Why Interactive (JetForm), 1998
- Acquisition of PermaTemp/PTI, 1999
- Acquisition of PPI, 1999
- Acquisition of MacDonald Brisson, 2000
- Acquisition of Titan Consulting Group Ltd., 2004
- Acquisition of Primacy Management Inc., 2012
- Acquisition of Amtek Engineering Services Ltd., 2014
- Acquisition of Med-Team, 2014
- Acquisition of DWP, 2014
- Acquisition of International Safety Research (ISR), 2017
- Acquisition of Secure Technologies International, 2018
- Acquisition of IntraGrain Technologies Inc., 2018
- Acquisition of Tallysman Wireless Inc., 2020
- Acquisition of EMSEC Solutions Inc., 2020
- Acquisition of SimFront Simulation Systems Corporation, 2021
- Acquisition of Decisive Group Inc., 2023
- Acquisition of MDA Ltd. Nuclear assets, 2024
- Acquisition of Mabway, 2024

== Business of the company ==
Calian currently operates five distinct service lines:

=== Health ===
Calian Health provides project services and consulting in the management of health care professionals and health programs, as well as the operation and management of primary care and occupational health clinics. They have a network of more than 1,800 health care professionals, who attend to over six million patient visits per year at over 180 clinic locations across Canada.

Calian also provides health support services for the Canadian Armed Forces at all bases across the country. In September 2017, the company re-won its health services contract with DND, and at the same time was awarded new health support services contracts for the RCMP and Veterans Affairs Canada. These contracts are scheduled to begin April 1, 2018, and in aggregate have a value of up to $1 billion over the full 12-year period.

Calian also provides on-site health services to corrections institutions, detention centres and large organizations operating in Canada's oil sands.

=== Training ===
Calian provides specialized training to both public and private sector organizations. The company's training programs and exercises prepare civilians, police and military personnel designated for operation deployment. Calian offers emergency management and military training exercises as part of their service offerings.

In 2017 Calian acquired International Safety Research Inc. The acquisition of this Ottawa-based firm expanded Calian's training service expertise into nuclear safety and nuclear power emergency preparedness and established a presence in Dubai and the Netherlands.

=== IT and professional services ===
Calian's IT & Professional Services line offers cyber security, SAP consulting, IT support, and cloud consulting.

In 2017 Calian formed partnerships with security vendors including Fortinet Technologies, Cylance, Gemalto, Terranova and Forcepoint. This "Cyber Resilience Office" offers solutions to help organizations protect, detect, respond to and recover from cyber attacks and breaches.

=== Systems engineering ===
Calian offers services for communication gateways and planning systems, communication ground systems and communication products. One of Calian's largest customers in this service line is SiriusXM, the satellite radio provider.

The Systems Engineering line provided the deep-space antennas supporting the European Space Agency's (ESA) Rosetta spacecraft landing on comet 67P/Churyumov–Gerasimenko in 2014. These three antennas, located in Australia, Spain and Argentina, are some of the largest in the world, spanning 35 meters.

=== Contract manufacturing ===
Calian provides contract manufacturing services to both commercial and defence customers. These may be electronic assemblies used in vehicle electronics and surveillance applications.

Calian's services are delivered through two divisions:

- Business and Technology Services (BTS): which is headquartered in Ottawa, with offices in Toronto, Montreal, Kingston, Halifax, Oromocto, and Edmonton. BTS' capabilities include the provision of business and technology services to industry, public and government in the health, training, engineering and IT services domains.
- Systems Engineering Division (SED): SED, located in Saskatoon, plans, designs and implements complex communication systems for space agencies and satellite manufacturers and operators. SED also provides contract manufacturing services for both private sector and military customers in North America.

== Corporate governance ==
Current members of the Calian board of directors are:

- George Weber (Chairman)
- Valerie Sorbie
- Ray Basler
- Jo-Anne Poirier
- Young Park
- Ronald Richardson
- Kevin Ford
