= Michael A. Chambers =

Canadian lawyer (born 1946)

- Born: July 21, 1949 (age 76); Old Ottawa East, Ottawa, Canada
- Occupation: Lawyer
- Known for: President of the Canadian Olympic Committee
- Honours: Olympic Order (2010); Canadian Olympic Order (2012) Honorary Doctorate University of Ottawa (2013)

Michael A. Chambers (born July 21, 1946) is the former president of the Canadian Olympic Committee and senior partner at Maclaren Corlett LLP. As of 2021, Chambers serves as chair of the Association of National Olympic Committees Legal Commission, chair of the Panam Sports Legal Commission, and chair of the Ethics Commission of the International Canoe Federation.

A former athlete, Chambers served as president of Canoe Kayak Canada (CKC) between 1986 and 1988 after having been appointed by the CKC in 1984 to be its representative on the Canadian Olympic Committee. From 2001 to 2010, Chambers served as president of the Canadian Olympic Committee before serving on the executive board and various Commission positions with Association of National Olympic Committees and with the Pan American Sports Organization now known as Panam Sports.

In 2010, he was honoured with the Olympic Order for his services to the Olympic Movement in Canada.

== Personal life ==
Chambers came from a family of paddlers. His father, a 1936 Canadian Canoe Racing National Champion, volunteered with the Rideau Canoe Club which is where his parents met. It was through his history of paddling that Chambers became one of the founding directors of the Ottawa Dragon Boat Festival and served as its chairman from 1999 to 2001.

Chambers earned his commerce law degree at the University of Ottawa. In 2010, he was inducted into the Common Law Honour Society of the University of Ottawa. In 2013, he was awarded an Honorary Doctorate by the University of Ottawa.

== Career ==
As a teenager in the 1960s, Chambers competed with the Rideau Canoe Club and later served on its board of directors before becoming president of the Canoe Kayak Canada. Through his presidency with Canoe Kayak Canada, he served on the board of the Canadian Olympic Association, now the Canadian Olympic Committee. In 2001, Chambers was elected president of the association (later renamed Canadian Olympic Committee) after running against fellow lawyer Doug Hamilton. Chambers had been previously involved with the Olympic Games by serving as Chef de Mission of the Canadian Olympic Team at the 1996 Summer Olympics.

Immediately following the 2002 Winter Olympics, Chambers initiated and spearheaded an appeal on behalf of cross country skier Beckie Scott which ultimately led to Beckie Scott having her bronze medal won at the Games upgraded to gold in accord with the Order of the Court of Arbitration for Sport.

He was re-elected as president in 2005 and in October 2008, became the first Canadian to be elected vice-president of the Pan American Sports Organization. That same year, the Canadian Olympic Committee began the Athlete Excellence Fund for Beijing 2008, which provides athletes with monetary rewards for placements in the top five and above during the Olympic games. The Athlete Excellence Fund was the first of its kind from the Canadian Olympic Committee for Canadian athletes.

He then served as vice chair of Vancouver's 2010 Olympic and Paralympic bid and on VANOC's Governance and Ethics committee. In 2010, he was replaced as president of the Canadian Olympic Committee by Marcel Aubut and assumed the role of president of the Pan American Sport Organization Legislative Commission. On 1 March 2010, Chambers was awarded the Olympic Order for his contributions to Canadian sport and the Olympics globalization.

In 2012, the president of the Association of National Olympic Committees (ANOC) announced he would like to create a Legal Commission consisting of Chambers, Gilbert Grésenguet, and Marc Theisen. In 2013, ANOC created the Juridical Commission which Chambers was elected chairman of. The same year, he was inducted into the Ottawa Sports Hall of Fame and awarded an honorary doctorate from the University of Ottawa.

Due to his Olympic Games experience, he was selected for the International Olympic Committee (IOC) 2014 Olympic Winter Games Working Group. The IOC working group is composed of experts from the International Federations, National Olympic Committees, and the IOC Athletes’ Commission to evaluate country bids. He also served on the Toronto 2015 PanAm Games Organizing Committee board with Chris Rudge, Marcel Aubut, and Roger Garland and in 2016 joined an organizing committee headed by John Furlong to encourage another Canadian Olympic bid.

In 2016, Chambers served as chair of the ANOC Legal Commission, and was re-selected as chairman for the 2018–2022 commission.
