= Rowing at the 1984 Summer Olympics – Women's coxless pair =

Women's coxless pair at the Games of the XXIII Olympiad
- Date: 4 August 1984
- Competitors: 12 from 6 nations

Medalists
1st place, gold medalist(s)		Rodica Arba; Elena Horvat	Romania
2nd place, silver medalist(s)		Elizabeth Craig; Tricia Smith	Canada
3rd place, bronze medalist(s)		Ellen Becker; Iris Völkner	West Germany

The women's coxless pair competition at the 1984 Summer Olympics took place at took place at Lake Casitas, California, United States.

With only 6 boats in the competition, a single race was held.

== Results ==
The final was held on 4 August, with calm winds and 18 °C temperatures. At the halfway mark, the Romanian boat had opened a 2.6 second lead, which stretched to 3.5 seconds by the end. The Canadians and West Germans were relatively close for second and third halfway through, but the Canadians pulled away to take the silver medal relatively easily. The Dutch, American, and British boats were well behind the leaders; the Americans had a slight lead over the Dutch for 4th, but the Dutch team overtook them in the second half. The British team finished 6th, well behind the rest of the field.

Rank	Rowers	Nation	Time
1st place, gold medalist(s)	Rodica Arba; Elena Horvat	Romania	3:32.60
2nd place, silver medalist(s)	Elizabeth Craig; Tricia Smith	Canada	3:36.06
3rd place, bronze medalist(s)	Ellen Becker; Iris Völkner	West Germany	3:40.50
4	Lynda Cornet; Harriet van Ettekoven	Netherlands	3:44.01
5	Barbara Kirch; Chari Towne	United States	3:44.35
6	Ruth Howe; Kate Panter	Great Britain	3:48.53
