= Tricia Smith =

Canadian rower

Tricia Smith OC OBC OLY
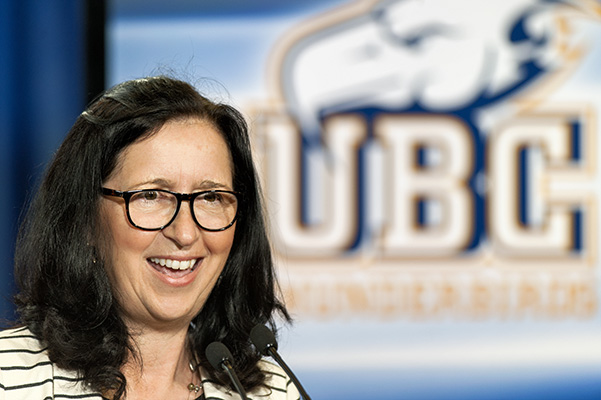

Personal information
- Full name: Tricia Catherine Marjorie Smith
- Born: April 14, 1957 (age 69) Vancouver, British Columbia, Canada

Sport
- Sport: Rowing
- Club: Burnaby Lake Rowing Club / UBC Thunderbirds
Medal record
Women's rowing
Representing Canada
Olympic Games
Silver medal – second place	1984 Los Angeles	Coxless pair
World Rowing Championships
Bronze medal – third place	1977 Amsterdam	Eight
Silver medal – second place	1981 Munich	Coxless pair
Bronze medal – third place	1982 Lucerne	Coxless pair
Bronze medal – third place	1983 Duisburg	Coxless pair
Bronze medal – third place	1985 Hazewinkel	Coxed four
Commonwealth Games
Gold medal – first place	1986 Edinburgh	Coxed four

Tricia Catherine Marjorie Smith (born April 14, 1957) is a Canadian lawyer and Olympic rower who was elected president of the Canadian Olympic Committee. She sits on the International Council of Arbitration for Sport.

== Biography ==
Smith was born in Vancouver, British Columbia. She graduated from the University of British Columbia (UBC) with a B.A. in 1981 and from UBC law school in 1985. She practised law in Vancouver, B.C. She received an honorary doctorate of laws degree from UBC in 2001 for her career in sport and her work in international sport and the law.

Smith won a silver medal in the coxless pair event with Betty Craig at the 1984 Summer Olympics. She also finished fifth in the same event at the 1976 Summer Olympics and seventh in coxed four at the 1988 Summer Olympics. Her participation in the Olympics grants her the OLY post-nominal letters.

Smith won seven World Championship medals and a Commonwealth Games gold medal in her career on the Canadian team that spanned from 1976 to 1988.

In 2010, she was made a member of the Order of Canada. In 2012, she was made a member of the Order of British Columbia. In 2024, she was promoted to an Officer of the Order of Canada.

In September 2013 she was elected to succeed Anita DeFrantz as Vice-President of FISA, the International Rowing Federation.

Smith was elected a vice president of the Canadian Olympic Committee in 2009. On October 3, 2015 she became the interim president after Marcel Aubut resigned his position. She was subsequently elected president at the COC Session in November 2015, and in June 2016 was nominated for membership of the International Olympic Committee.

In 2022, Smith was awarded the Order of Sport, marking her induction into Canada's Sports Hall of Fame. She was inducted as a builder for the sport of rowing. She Was appointed to the Order of Canada in 2024, with the rank of Officer.

Smith is also a member of the Board of the International Council of Arbitration for Sport, the organization that runs the Court of Arbitration for Sport, headquartered in Lausanne, Switzerland.
