= Kirk Wipper =

Canadian academic (1923–2011)

- Born: Kirk Albert Walter Wipper; December 6, 1923; Grahamdale, Manitoba
- Died: March 18, 2011 (aged 87); Peterborough, Ontario
- Occupation: Academic
- Known for: founder of the Canadian Canoe Museum

Kirk Albert Walter Wipper, CM (December 6, 1923 – March 18, 2011) was a Canadian academic and founder of the Canadian Canoe Museum, which is located in Peterborough, Ontario. He has been called a "pioneer in the development of outdoor education in Canada."

== Biography ==
Wipper was born December 6, 1923, in Grahamdale, Manitoba.

=== Canadian Canoe Museum ===
Wipper formed the Kanawa International Collection of Canoes, Kayaks and Rowing Craft. His collection, which consisted of more than six hundred individual watercraft, including kayaks and canoes, became the basis for what would become the Canadian Canoe Museum. In 1957, Wipper was gifted a dugout canoe, which is believed to have been crafted in 1890. Wipper soon began collecting other watercraft, which grew to approximately one hundred fifty pieces by the late 1960s. Wipper constructed a facility to house his collection at Camp Kandalore, a summer camp he owned in the vicinity of Dorset, Ontario. However, his growing collection outgrew this building, necessitating a search for a new facility. Wipper was contacted by a group of individuals, including several affiliated with the Trent University, who were interested in moving his collection to a permanent exhibition space in Peterborough, Ontario. Wipper agreed to the proposal and a board of directors was formed for the project in 1989. In 1994, Wipper donated his entire collection to the new Canadian Canoe Museum in Peterborough. He remained active in the museum as a volunteer and consultant.

=== Academic career ===
Wipper became a faculty member of the University of Toronto's School of Physical and Health Education in 1950. He worked as an assistant professor at the University of Toronto until his retirement in 1987. Wipper then served as the director of The Duke of Edinburgh's Award of Canada and the President of the Royal Life Saving Society of Canada following his retirement from academia. Wipper also founded Camp Kandalore in Ontario and co-founded the Canadian Recreational Canoeing Association.

=== Camp Kandalore ===
From the early 1950s through the 1980s, Wipper owned and led Camp Kandalore, one of Canada's leading camps that offered canoeing and camping experiences for boys. Throughout his years at Kandalore, Wipper led an extensive canoe tripping strategy. Under new leadership in the late 1990s, the camp became co-educational, and began to focus on expanding in-camp residential experiences and activities.

=== Honors ===
In 2002, Wipper was named to the Order of Canada and the Order of St. John. He was also a recipient of the Ontario Bicentennial Medal and the Government of Canada Centenary Medal.

Kirk Wipper died from a choking accident related to Parkinson's disease while eating dinner with friends and family near Peterborough on March 18, 2011, at the age of 87. He was survived by his wife, Ann.
