= Kate Panter =

British rower

Personal information
- Full name: Katerine Ruth Panter
- Nationality: British
- Born: 3 May 1962 (age 63) Great Barr, England

Sport
- Sport: Rowing
- Club: Weybridge Ladies ARC; Cambridge University WBC; Downing College BC

Katerine Ruth Panter (born 3 May 1962) is a former British rower. She competed in the women's coxless pair event at the 1984 Summer Olympics.

== Rowing career ==
As a teenager Panter joined the Weybridge Ladies ARC before Dan Topolski brought her into the British training squad along with teammates Jane Cross, Belinda Holmes and Joanna Toch in 1979.

She was part of the eight that won the national title, rowing for an A.R.A Composite, at the 1982 National Rowing Championships. She competed at the 1983 World Rowing Championships before being selected to represent Great Britain at the 1984 Olympic Games, where she was part of the women's coxless pair with Ruth Howe. The pair finished in sixth place.

== Medical career ==
She went to Downing College, Cambridge where she won three boat races and studied medicine, graduating in 1984. She qualified as a doctor at St Thomas's in 1987 and specialised in gynaecology. She became a fellow of the Royal College of Obstetricians and Gynaecologists in 2008 and was an accredited gynaecologist to the 2012 London Olympics.

== International rowing ==
- 1979 Fisa Youth Championships 8th Coxed fours
- 1980 Fisa Youth Championships 6th Coxless pair
- 1983 World Championships 8th Eight
- 1984 Olympics 6th Coxless pair
