= Elena Florea =

Elena Florea may refer to

- Elena Horvat (born 1958), Romanian rower
- Elena Murgoci (1960–1999), Romanian long-distance runner
