= Bruce Ford (rower) =

Canadian rower

Personal information
- Nationality: Canada
- Born: September 18, 1954 (age 71)

Sport
- Sport: Rowing
- Club: Burnaby Lake Rowing Club
Medal record
Bruce Ford
Medal record
Men's rowing
Representing Canada
Olympic Games
Bronze medal – third place	1984 Los Angeles	Quadruple sculls
Commonwealth Games
Gold medal – first place	1986 Edinburgh	Double sculls

Bruce Ford was a member of the Canadian Rowing team in the 1984 and 1988 Olympics, winning a bronze medal in the 1984 Men's Quadruple Sculls. Alongside Pat Walter, he won Gold in the Double Sculls at the 1986 Commonwealth Games.

Educated at Brentwood College School, Vancouver Island and the University of British Columbia, he now works as an Environmental Biologist in Vancouver. Ford lives in North Vancouver as of May 2017.
