= List of paddlesports organizations in Canada =

This is a list of paddlesports organizations in Canada. These paddle sport organizations and clubs oversee various competitive sports involving watercraft propelled using a paddle. Some paddle sports include dragonboat racing, swanboat racing, canoe racing and kayak racing.

== Competitive associations ==
- Canoe Kayak Canada (Canadian Canoe Association)
- Go Rowing and Paddling Association of Canada operated from 1996 to 2014

== Recreational associations ==
- Paddle Canada
  Formerly the Canadian Recreational Canoeing Association. Founded by John Eberhard and Ron Johnstone (1971). Affiliated organizations:
  - Paddle Alberta
  - Canoe Kayak New Brunswick
  - Paddle Newfoundland and Labrador
  - Canoe Kayak Nova Scotia
  - Eau Vive Québec
  - Paddle Manitoba
  - Canoe Kayak Saskatchewan
- Canot Kayak Québec
- Ontario Recreational Canoeing and Kayaking Association (ORCKA)
- Recreational Canoeing Association of British Columbia (RCABC)
- BC Whitewater
- Sea Kayak Association of BC (SKABC)

== Clubs ==
=== British Columbia ===
- Kelowna Canoe and Kayak Club
- Kelowna Dragon Boat Club
- Kelowna Outrigger Canoe Club
- Kelowna Rowing Club
- Vancouver Kayak Club (VKC)
- Beaver Canoe Club (BCC)

=== Ontario ===
- Burloak Canoe Club
- Rideau Canoe Club

=== Nova Scotia ===
- Mic Mac AAC
