= Burnaby Lake Rowing Club =

Canadian rowing club

- Location: Burnaby, British Columbia
- Founded: 1966
- Affiliations: Rowing Canada
- Website: www.blrc.ca

The Burnaby Lake Rowing Club (BLRC) is a rowing club located at Burnaby Lake in the City of Burnaby, British Columbia, Canada.

== History ==
The Burnaby Lake Aquatic Club (BLAC) was founded in 1966. In 1989, the club changed its name to the Burnaby Lake Rowing Club (BLRC). The club has helped produce many world-class rowers. For the list of Burnaby Lake Rowers at the Olympics, see below.

Early Years

In 1966, rowers Max Wieczorek, Daryl Sturdy, Roger Jackson and Robert Stubbs decided to train at Burnaby Lake. They lacked a coach, equipment and facilities. They approached Lawrence West who agreed to coach them. The crew loaned a coxed four rowing shell from the Lake Washington Rowing Club in Seattle, US, as well as four oars from the Shawnigan Lake School (SLS) in Vancouver Island. In addition, SLS's coxswain Billy Wheaton came from the city of Victoria to train with the crew during the summer. The Burnaby Lake Boosters Association (Note: The Burnaby Lake Boosters Association (BLBA) was incorporated in 1936 under the BC Societies Act with an aim to create a recreational area around the lake for water sports, nature trails and bird watching, as well as to improve the quality of the lake.) enlisted the Reeve (Mayor) of Burnaby, Allan Emmott to be part of the group to support the oarsmen under the name Burnaby Lake Aquatic Club. Through the generosity of the Municipality, the club was able to operate out of an abandoned house at the bottom of Piper Avenue. The Vancouver Sun newspaper published an article about the crew: "Oar deep in lily pads, the crew of the Burnaby Lake Aquatic Club starts looking into open water. That's 18-year-old coxswain Bill Wheaton looking forlornly over his shoulder as Daryl Sturdy, Max Wieczorek, Roger Jackson and Bob Stubbs heave to in an effort to escape the green jungle." Ken Oakes, a Vancouver Sun photographer, took a picture of the crew out in the lily pads. The photo and story were featured in newspapers across the country, in the magazines Life and Paris Match.

In 1968, Daryl Sturdy and Robert Stubbs rowed in the 2x for Canada at the Mexico City Olympics. Both of them personally contributed $500.00 to be on the team to Mexico while the rowers from eastern Canada didn't have to. Harry Jerome suggested setting up a provincial association to get a more equitable distribution of funds forthcoming from the province. After the Olympics, the British Columbia Rowing Association (BCRA) was founded in 1969.

The Burnaby Lake rowing course was dredged in 1971–1972, in preparation for the 1973 Canada Summer Games.

In 1973, Rowing Canada Aviron (RCA) established the first national training centre at Burnaby Lake. At that time, the organization was called the Canadian Association of Amateur Oarsmen (CAAO). Alan Roaf was the RCA's first professional coach. Initially, Allan was the only national coach at the lake. As the buildup to the Montreal Olympics in 1976 continued, more male rowers were training at the lake. Then the female rowers under Lawrence West emerged. The Canadian national rowing team transitioned from a club to a composite crew development program conceived by Martin Bielz, who was the Technical Director of the RCA at that time. Burnaby Lake was the center of this transition. After the Montreal Olympics, in the 1977–78 season, Patrick Sweeney joined the Burnaby Lake club to coach the women.

Later Years

Robert Stubbs invited Richard (Dick) McClure to join the club in 1976. Initially, Dick engaged in boat maintenance and fundraising. In 1978, Dick started coaching junior rowers. From 1980 to 2010, he was the club's volunteer head coach. During his tenure, 58 Burnaby Lake rowers become members of the Canadian national rowing team.

Over the years, the lake deteriorated as a result of natural infilling and sedimentation. The rowing course was dredged again in 2010-2012 to rejuvenate the lake's precious open-water quality.

The club works closely with Rowing Canada and BC Rowing, and continues to run programs for all levels of rowing and has strong Novice, Junior, Senior and Masters programs.

As of 2017, the City of Burnaby has invested in a weed cutter to cut the weeds on the lake that were interfering with Summer Rowing.

In early 2021, the City of Burnaby installed a brand-new dock to replace the old wooden one. The new dock is anti-slip and features an accessible ramp entry for para-rowing.

== Facilities ==
The club uses a 2,000 metre long water course along Burnaby Lake. The course has an east–west orientation. For regattas, the course is buoyed with a six-lane albano system. The course is one of three FISA standard courses in Canada. It provides ideal racing conditions with calm waters and minimal wind.

== Membership ==
The club's membership includes around 90 members.

Lifetime Membership

The club bestows a Life membership to an individual who has given an outstanding contribution to the sport of rowing. Life members include: Kathleen Heddle, Richard (Dick) McClure, Charles Edward (Ned) Pratt., Frank Read, Glen Smith, Tricia Smith and Robert Stubbs

== Burnaby Lake Rowers at the Olympics ==
The club members rowing for Canada at the Olympic games include:

Burnaby Lake Rowing Club

Tokyo 2020
Madison Mailey W8+ (Gold)

Stephanie Grauer W4-

Rio 2016
Lauren Wilkinson W8+

London 2012
Lauren Wilkinson W8+ (Silver)
Michael Wilkinson M4-

Beijing 2008
Sabrina Kolker W2-

Athina 2004
Sabrina Kolker W8+

Sydney 2000
Theresa Luke W2-, W8+ (Bronze)
Laryssa Biesenthal W8+ (Bronze)

Atlanta 1996
Theresa Luke W8+ (Silver)
Jessica Monroe W8+ (Silver)
Laryssa Biesenthal W4x (Bronze)
Kathleen Heddle W2x (Gold), W4x (Bronze)
Richard (Dick) McClure (Boatman, Coach M2x)

Barcelona 1992
Kathleen Heddle W2- (Gold), W8+ (Gold)
Jessica Monroe W4-(Gold), W8+ (Gold)
Megan Delehanty W8+ (Gold)
Michael Rascher M8+ (Gold)

Burnaby Lake Aquatic Club

Seoul 1988
Tricia Smith W4-
Bruce Ford M2x
Pat Walter M2x

Los Angeles 1984
Tricia Smith W2- (Silver)
Bruce Ford M4x (Bronze)

Montreal 1976
Tricia Smith W2-
Ian Gordon M4-
Robert Bergen M4+

Munich 1972
Ian Gordon M4-

Mexico City 1968
Daryl Sturdy M8+, M2x
Robert Stubbs M2x
