= Elizabeth Craig (rower) =

Canadian rower (born 1957)

Personal information
- Born: Marion Elizabeth Craig; September 26, 1957 (age 68) Brockville, Ontario
- Height: 170 cm (5 ft 7 in)
- Weight: 61 kg (134 lb)

Sport
- Sport: Rowing
- Club: Brockville RC
Medal record
Women's rowing
Representing Canada
Olympic Games
Silver medal – second place	1984 Los Angeles	Coxless pair
World Rowing Championships
Bronze medal – third place	1977 Amsterdam	Coxless pair
Silver medal – second place	1978 Karapiro	Coxless pair
Silver medal – second place	1981 Munich	Coxless pair
Bronze medal – third place	1982 Lucerne	Coxless pair
Bronze medal – third place	1983 Duisburg	Coxless pair

Marion Elizabeth "Betty" Craig (later Eaton, born September 26, 1957, in Brockville, Ontario) is a Canadian rower. She won a silver medal in the coxless pair event with Patricia Smith at the 1984 Summer Olympics. She also finished fifth in the same event at the 1976 Summer Olympics.
