= Canadian Canoe Museum =

Museum in Ontario, Canada

The Canadian Canoe Museum
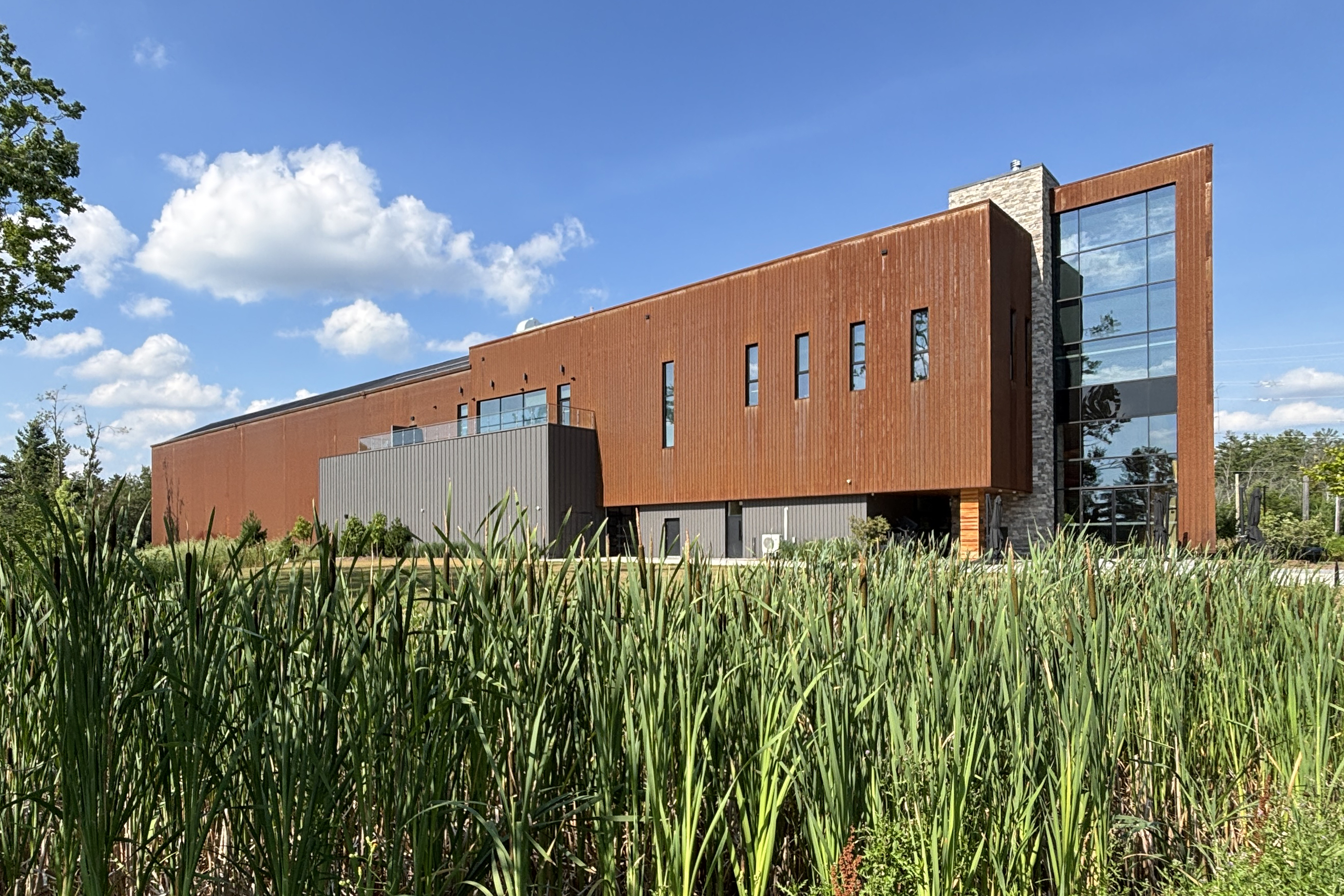
- The Canadian Canoe Museum new building (2024)
- Established: 1997
- Location: Peterborough, Ontario, Canada
- Coordinates: 44.2982°N 78.3013°W
- Type: sport museum
- Founder: Kirk Wipper
- General Manager: Carolyn Hyslop
- Curator: Jeremy Ward
- Website: www.canoemuseum.ca

The Canadian Canoe Museum, located in Peterborough, Ontario, Canada, is a museum dedicated to canoes. The museum's mission is to preserve and share the culture and history of the canoe's enduring significance to the peoples of Canada through an exceptional collection of canoes, kayaks, and paddled watercraft."

== History ==
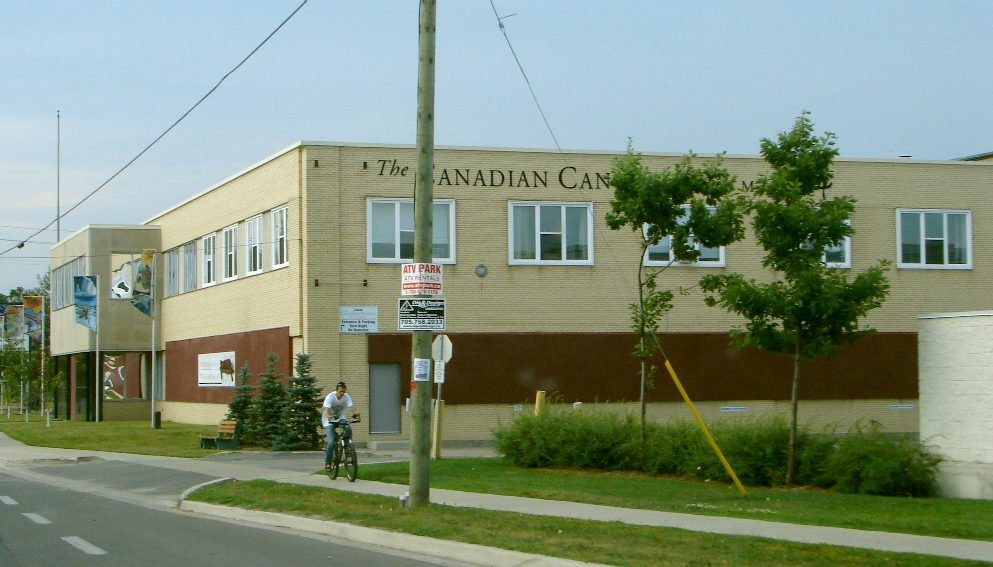
The Canadian Canoe Museum Building before relocation

It was founded as the Kanawa Museum, which was also called the Kanawa International Collection of Canoes, Kayaks and Rowing Craft, in 1957 by Kirk Wipper at Camp Kandalore, north of Minden, Ontario, when a friend presented Professor Wipper with a dugout made circa 1890. Over the years, the collection grew. It was housed inadequately in wooden buildings at Kandalore, and by the late 1980s it was becoming clear that a new home would be needed. Wipper transferred control of his historic collection in 1994 to the organization now called the Canadian Canoe Museum. The museum now holds the largest collection of its kind, with more than 600 canoes and kayaks, and a thousand related artifacts. The museum opened its doors to the public at its new location, a former outboard motor factory in Peterborough, on Canada Day in 1997.

In May 2006, Prince Andrew, as a member of the Canadian Royal Family, accepted the invitation to become the royal patron of the museum, and visited on May 11 to celebrate its 10th anniversary. He also donated three canoes, originally built in the area of Peterborough, and gifted to the Royal Family between 1947 and 1981, on long-term loan.

Transport of the collection to a new facility still under construction began in July 2023. The new building is located on the edge of Little Lake near the Trent–Severn Waterway canal lock. The new facility opened to the public 11th May, 2024, with dignitaries present and a video message from the Prime Minister of Canada.

== Exhibits ==
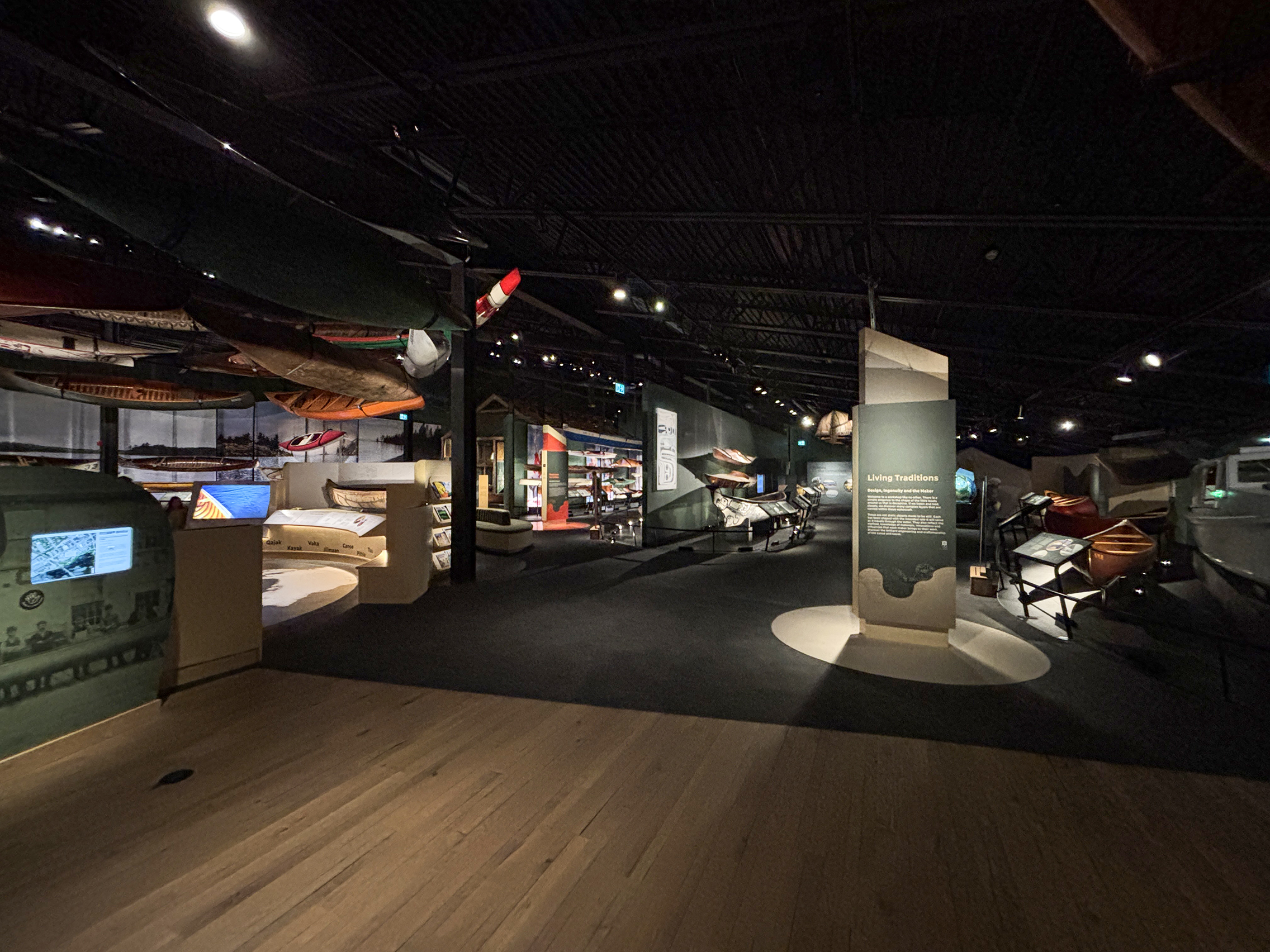
Exhibition at the Canadian Canoe Museum

The Canadian Canoe Museum features exhibits that examine the significance of the canoe in shaping Canadian identity and culture. In addition to its extensive canoe collection, the museum includes interactive displays such as a recreated waterfall and a traditional Mi'kmaq wigwam, where visitors can listen to creation stories. The Preserving Skills Gallery allows visitors to experience hands-on activities like birchbark canoe construction. Other exhibits offer opportunities to plan a prospecting expedition inspired by the gold rush era, explore the life of a voyageur during the fur trade period, and learn about cottaging traditions in early 20th-century Canada.

A notable exhibition was introduced in October 2001, when the museum launched Reflections: The Land, the People and the Canoe. This exhibit brought increased attention to the museum by displaying Pierre Trudeau's iconic buckskin jacket and birchbark canoe to the public for the first time, along with personal items belonging to other notable paddlers, including Bill Mason, Victoria Jason, and Eric Morse.

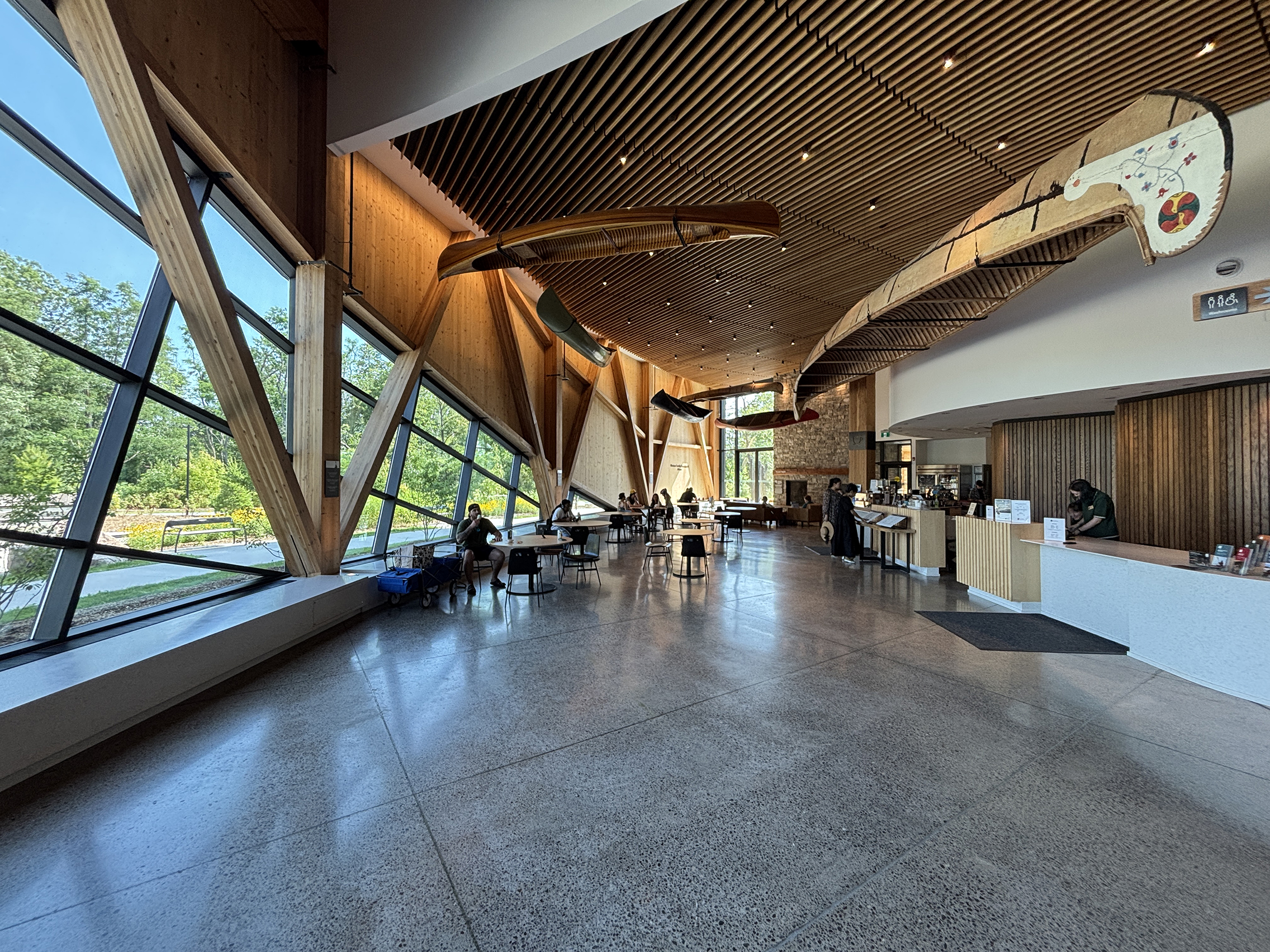
Lobby

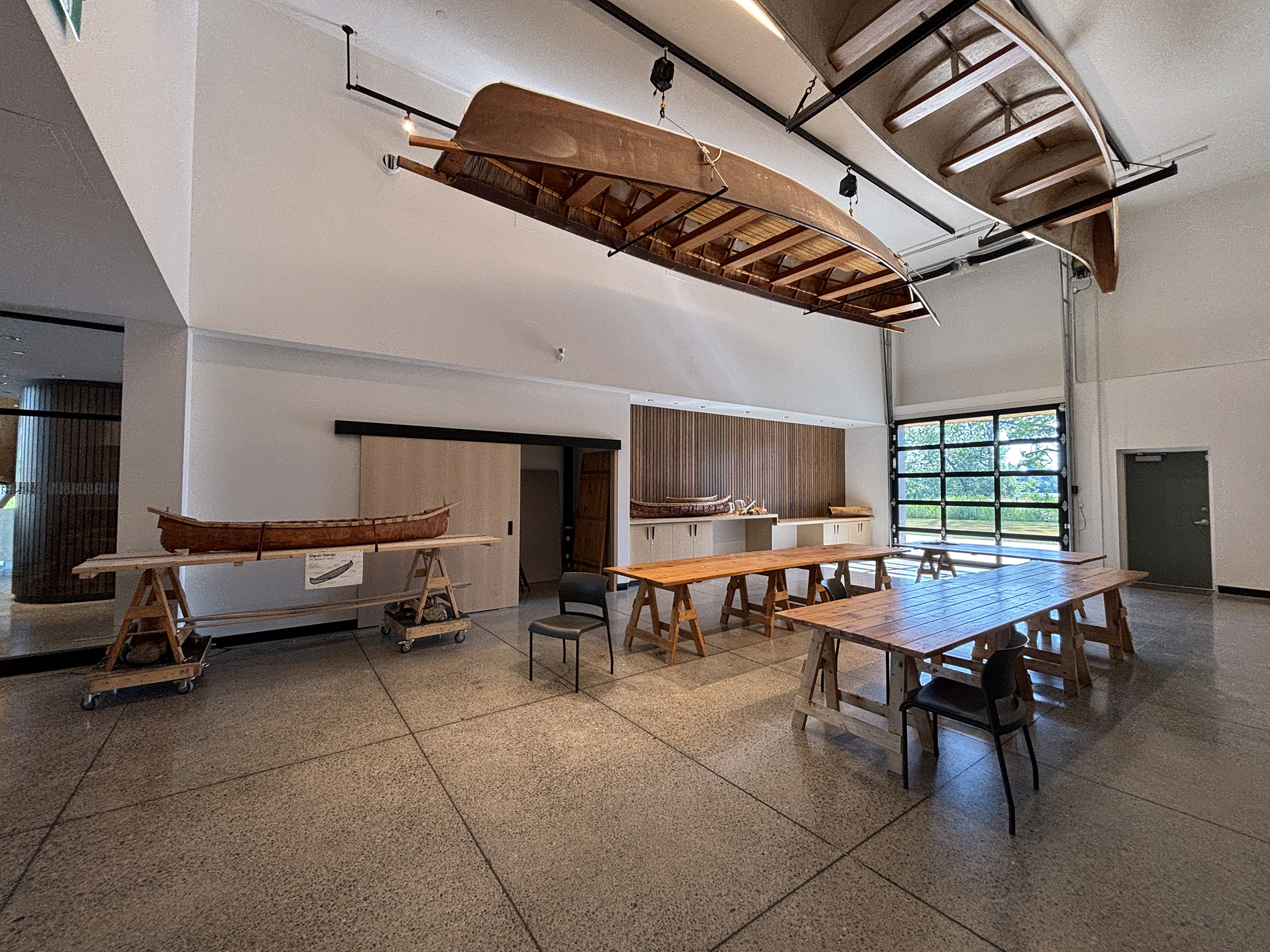
Workshops

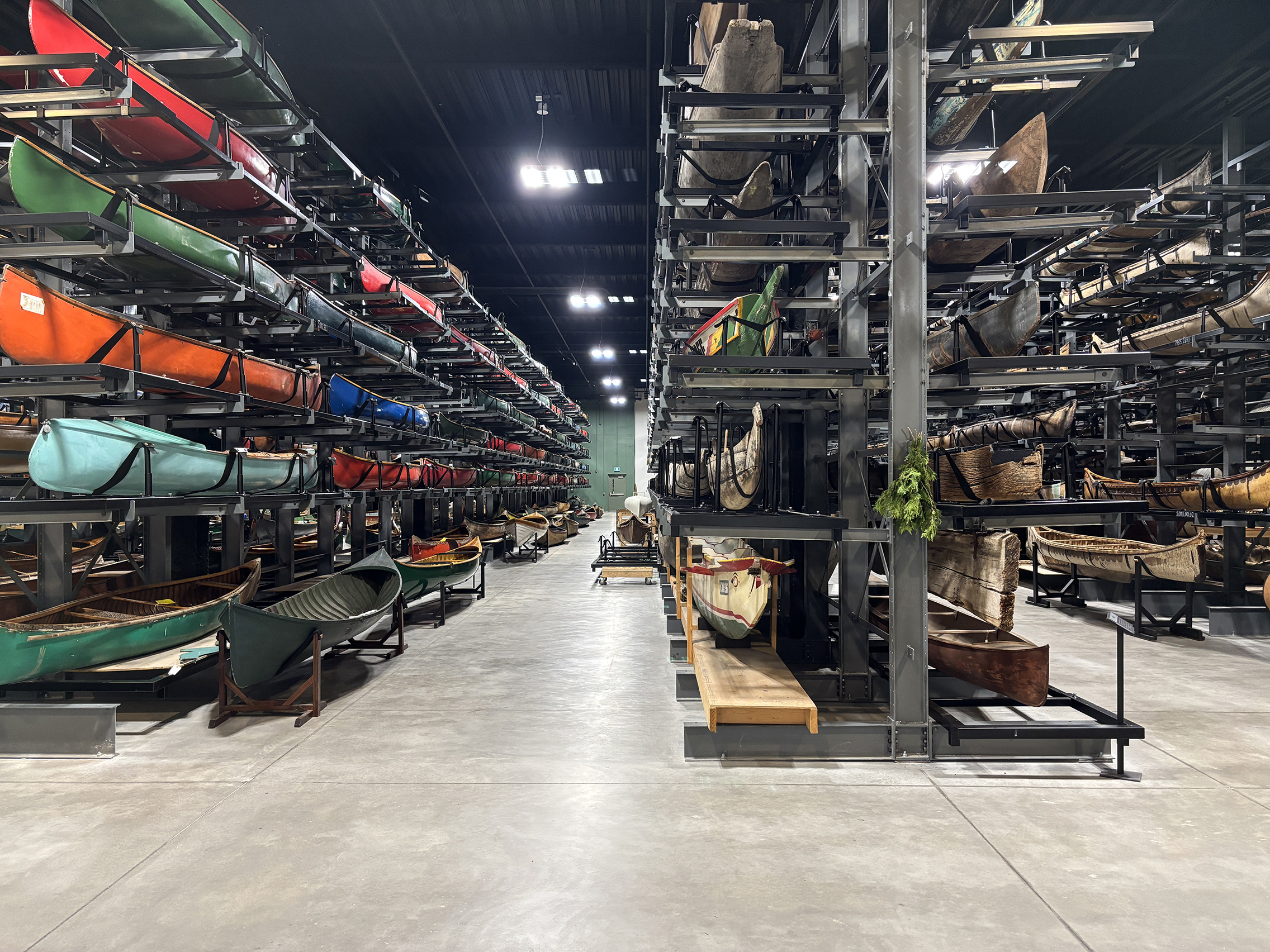
Collection Hall

== Visiting information ==
The Canadian Canoe Museum, located on 2077 Ashburnham Drive, Peterborough, Ontario, is open daily from 10 am until 5 pm.

== Affiliations ==
The museum is affiliated with: Canadian Museums Association, Canadian Heritage Information Network, and Virtual Museum of Canada.
