= Chari Towne =

American rower

Personal information
- Born: July 26, 1960 (age 64); Wild Rose, Wisconsin, United States

Sport
- Sport: Rowing

Chari Towne (born July 26, 1960) is an American rower. She competed in the women's coxless pair event at the 1984 Summer Olympics.
