= Peter Šťastný =

Slovak-Canadian ice hockey player (born 1956)

- Hockey Hall of Fame, 1998
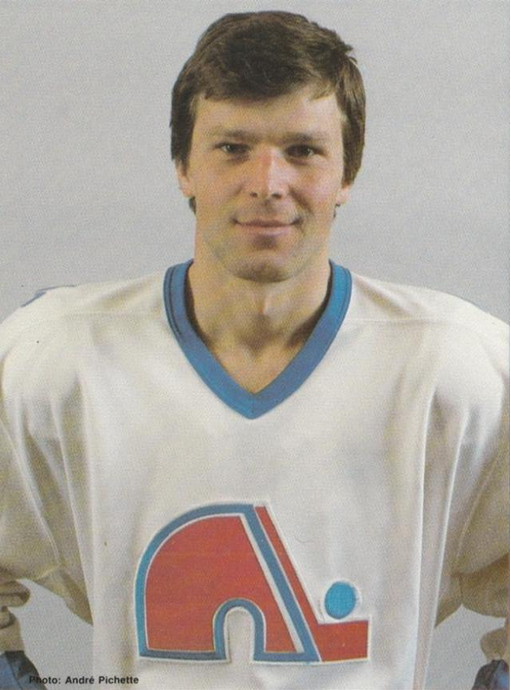
- Šťastný with the Quebec Nordiques in 1985
- Born: 18 September 1956 (age 70) Bratislava, Czechoslovakia
- Height: 6 ft 1 in (185 cm)
- Weight: 200 lb (91 kg; 14 st 4 lb)
- Position: Centre
- Shot: Left
- Played for: Slovan Bratislava; Quebec Nordiques; New Jersey Devils; St. Louis Blues
- National team: Czechoslovakia, Canada and Slovakia
- NHL draft: Undrafted
- Playing career: 1975–1995

Member of the European Parliament for Slovakia
- In office 20 July 2004 – 1 July 2014

Personal details
- Party: Slovak Democratic and Christian Union - Democratic Party, (EPP-ED)
- Spouse: Darina Šťastná
- Children: Yan; Paul

Peter Šťastný (Slovak pronunciation: [ˈpeter ˈʂcastniː]; born 18 September 1956), also known colloquially as "Peter the Great" and "Stosh", is a Slovak Canadian former professional ice hockey player and politician who played in the National Hockey League (NHL) from 1980 to 1995. He played 16 seasons in the NHL for the Quebec Nordiques, New Jersey Devils, and St. Louis Blues.

A consistent scorer in his day, Šťastný initially played hockey with HC Slovan Bratislava in his native Czechoslovakia, which he represented in international play that saw him win the Ice Hockey World Championships in 1976 and 1977. However, fears over the regime led to him taking a chance to defect alongside his wife and his brother Anton, doing so in August 1980 after a club tournament in Austria provided the opportunity. The defection was successful and he would play with his brother for the Nordiques and quickly became one of the major stars of Eastern bloc hockey to join the league. In his very first season with the Nordiques, he won the Calder Memorial Trophy for his play as a rookie, which saw him set history as the first rookie to record 70 assists and 100 total points in their first season in the NHL; it was the first of six consecutive 100-point seasons. The following year saw him play with his older brother Marián to become the third trio of brothers to play on the same team in NHL history. In the decade of the 1980s, Šťastný recorded the second most points for all players in the NHL, behind only Wayne Gretzky. He became a Canadian citizen in 1984 just in time for the Canada Cup, who won the tournament with Šťastný on the roster.

The 1989–90 season saw him record his 1,000th point as a player before he was traded to the Devils late in the season. Upon the breakup of Czechoslovakia, he represented the Slovakia national team for their first appearance in an elite ice hockey competition in the 1994 Winter Olympics, serving as the captain. He retired from the NHL in 1995. In 977 games, he recorded 450 goals and 789 assists for 1,239 points, which was seventeenth most in NHL history when he retired; currently, he ranks 34th all time in NHL points and second overall for players born in Slovakia. He was inducted into the Hockey Hall of Fame in 1998 and was inducted into the IIHF Hall of Fame in 2000.

He served as general manager for the Slovak team for the 2002 IIHF World Championship, which won the gold medal for the country's first championship. He served as a member of the European Parliament for Slovakia from 2004 to 2014. In 2017, Šťastný was named one of the '100 Greatest NHL Players' in history. He is also the father of former NHL center Paul Stastny.

== Early life ==
Šťastný was born in Bratislava, Czechoslovakia as the fourth son of Stanislav and Frantiska Šťastný. His two older brothers, Vladimir (born 1945) and Bohumil (born 1947), were born when the family still lived in the village of Pružina, about 170 kilometres northeast of Bratislava. They moved to Bratislava before the birth of Marián (1953), Peter (1956), Anton (1959), and Eva (1966). Stanislav worked for a state-run company that built hydro-electric dams until 1980 when he retired, and mainly dealt with managing inventory. Frantiska stayed at home and raised the children. Vladimir would later serve as an assistant coach of the Slovak national ice hockey team and was the only coach with all three medals in Slovak ice hockey history.

Šťastný recalled the memories as an eleven-year-old when the Soviet Union invaded Czechoslovakia in 1968:

I understood what was going on. I knew enough. Going through the emotions. I had a conflict with my dad because he was worried about my older brothers, who were back in Bratislava, and there were people getting killed in the main square in Bratislava by Soviet soldiers, tanks rolling everywhere. There were young students protesting and they were victims. My dad was worried about it. I told him, ‘Dad, if I was there, I would be there (protesting), too.’ He started screaming at me. Because he was worried about us. I still have very strong memories.

He played with Slovan ChZJD Bratislava beginning in 1974 when he was eighteen years old. One particular cherished memory came with the 1976 Canada Cup tournament that saw him enjoy the sights of the host city in Quebec City. He represented the national team for the World Junior Ice Hockey Championships in 1975 and 1976 before playing for the Ice Hockey World Championships from 1976 to 1979, which saw them win in 1976 and 1977. He played for the national team in the 1980 Winter Olympics, recording seven goals and assists each but already felt the pressure of the Communist regime due to his outspoken nature. With his wife Darina being pregnant, his fears over what could happen with his family led to him deciding to defect at the first chance he could. A European tournament in August 1980 in Innsbruck, Austria gave him a chance he was waiting for, he fled with his wife and brother Anton.

== NHL career ==
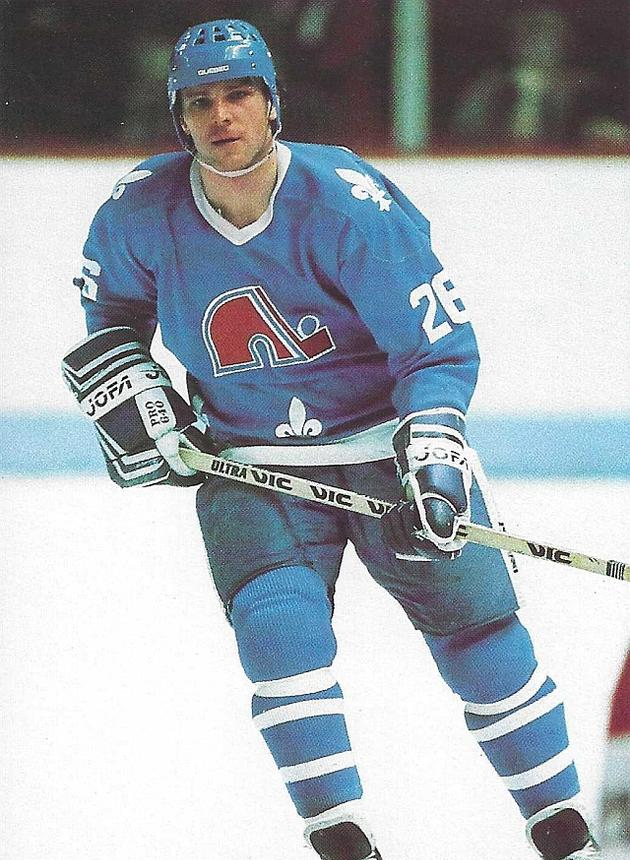
Peter Stastny in 1985.

When Šťastný made the decision to defect, he got a directory with available NHL phone numbers. He made his call to the Quebec Nordiques for a couple of reasons, noting that he liked his Canada Cup experiences in the city a few years earlier and also wanting to play with his brother Anton, who had been drafted by the team in 1979. Front office executive Gilles Leger agreed to help and got on a flight with team president Marcel Aubut to fly to Austria and aided the Šťastný family board a car to Vienna on 25 August, where they sought political asylum at the Canadian embassy before flying to Canada. They signed with the Nordiques the following day. In his first season of play in the 1980–81 season, he recorded 39 goals with 70 assists for a total of 109 points. It was the first time a player had recorded 100 points in their first season in the NHL.

Šťastný was a prolific scorer in the NHL in the 1980s. He started his career in the NHL with the Quebec Nordiques in 1980 and was traded in 1990 to the New Jersey Devils. As a star member of a team playing in an almost monolingual francophone city, Šťastný endeared himself to the Quebec fans by learning to speak French, and later learned to speak English. He retired as a member of the St. Louis Blues in 1995.

When the startling news broke in 1980 that Czechoslovakia player of the year, Šťastný, and his brother, Anton, had defected to Canada to play with the Quebec Nordiques, it represented a watershed moment in professional ice hockey as one of the first major stars of Eastern bloc hockey to join the NHL. The following year, his brother, Marián, joined them and they became the third trio of brothers to play on the same professional ice hockey team (the first being the Bentley brothers of the Chicago Blackhawks in the 1940s and the second being the Plager brothers of the St. Louis Blues in the 1970s). Peter and Anton share the rookie record for points in a game, with 8, which they accomplished in the same game against the Washington Capitals on February 22, 1981. Two days earlier, they each recorded six points against the Vancouver Canucks. These two games, played two days apart, are four out of the eleven total instances in which rookies have recorded at least 6 points in a game.

The trickle of Czechoslovak and Soviet hockey players rapidly became a flood following his footsteps. According to Peter, his defection "was the best decision I ever made. It has given my family the choices and options that people behind the Iron Curtain could only dream of. Then, to play pro hockey with my two brothers was like icing on the cake."

On the ice, Peter proved to be both consistent and productive. He scored 450 goals and added 789 assists for a total of 1239 points in the regular season. At the end of his career, he captained the Slovak national team in various international tournaments and still enjoys huge popularity among Slovaks.

The 1994–95 season saw him play in just six games while being plagued by a serious knee injury. He missed games in April to play in the World Championships. He returned to play one more game on 28 April, recording one shot on goal in what ended up as his final NHL game.

Peter was inducted into the Hockey Hall of Fame in 1998 alongside his former linemate, Michel Goulet. They were the first Hall of Famers to earn their credentials primarily with the Nordiques and their successors, the Colorado Avalanche.

== NHL milestones and records ==
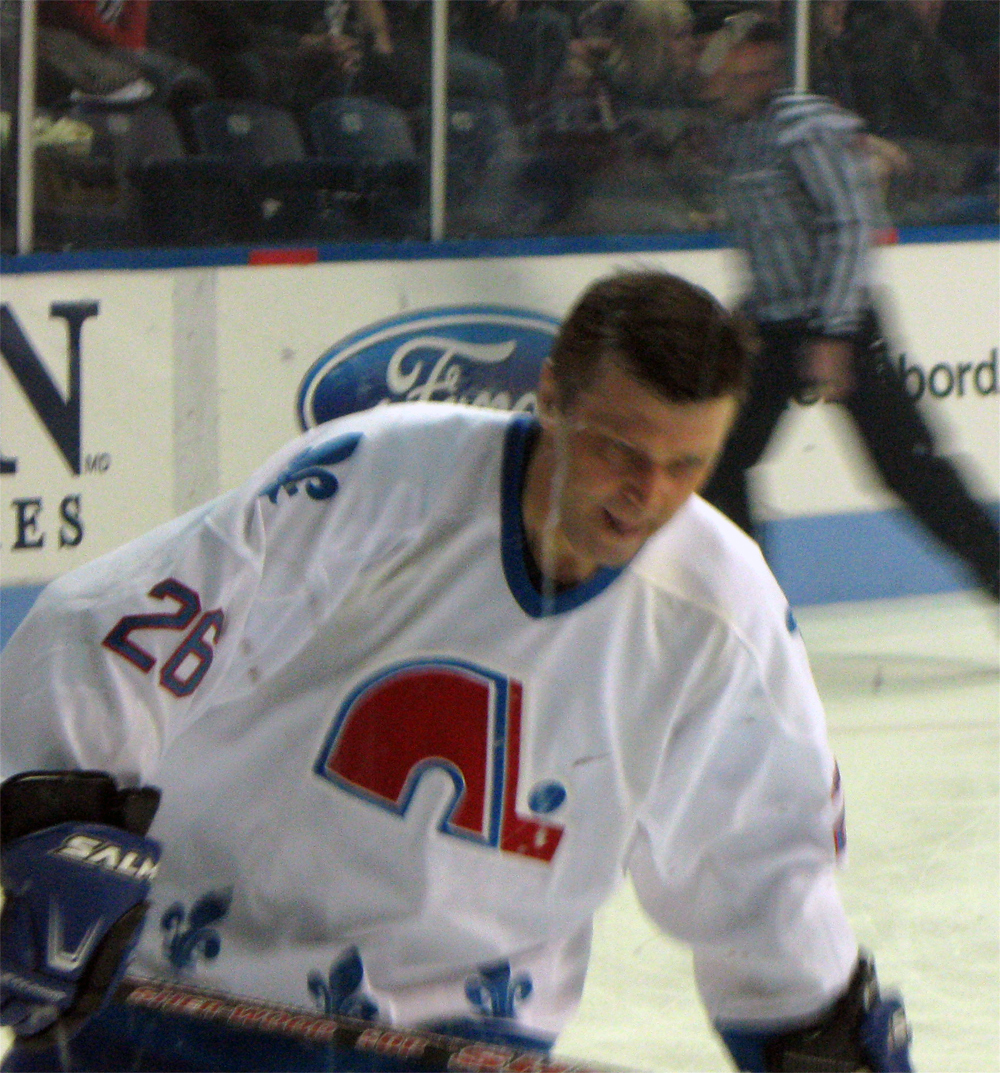
Šťastný during an alumni game in 2010

- 1st player in NHL history to collect over 100 points in rookie year (109) (Note: Wayne Gretzky had 137 points (51 goals, 86 assists) in his first year in the NHL (1979–80), but was not considered a "rookie", due to his time spent with the World Hockey Association's Indianapolis Racers and Edmonton Oilers, where he won the rookie of the year award in that league during the 1978–79 season with 110 points.)
- Shares NHL record for most assists in a season by a rookie with Joe Juneau (70).
- Holds NHL record for points in a game by a rookie with 8 (four goals and four assists on 22 February 1981 against Washington Capitals).
- Holds NHL record for points in a road game with 8 (four goals and four assists on 22 February 1981 against Washington Capitals).
- Holds NHL record for points in two consecutive games with 14 (3 goals and 3 assists on 20 February 1981 against Vancouver Canucks and 4 goals and 4 assists on 22 February 1981 against Washington Capitals).
- Holds Nordiques/Avalanche franchise record for hat tricks with 16.

== Personal life ==
Peter is the father of Yan Stastny and Paul Stastny. Paul began his career with the Colorado Avalanche (the same franchise as the Quebec Nordiques, Peter's first NHL team) in the 2006–07 season, followed by the St. Louis Blues, for whom Peter also played. Paul also played for the Vegas Golden Knights, Winnipeg Jets and Carolina Hurricanes, before retiring in 2023. Yan made his NHL debut in the 2005–06 season with the Edmonton Oilers and last played professionally for the EHC Lustenau in 2018. Born in Quebec City but raised in St. Louis, Yan played for Team USA in the 2005 and 2006 World Championships. Paul would represent Team USA in the 2010 Winter Olympics and 2014 Winter Olympics. The family is the first ice hockey family known to have represented four countries in international play (Czechoslovakia, Canada, Slovakia, United States). Paul broke the record for a scoring streak in a rookie season in the NHL and was a finalist for the Calder Memorial Trophy in 2007, which his father had won over two decades prior.

== Post-playing career ==
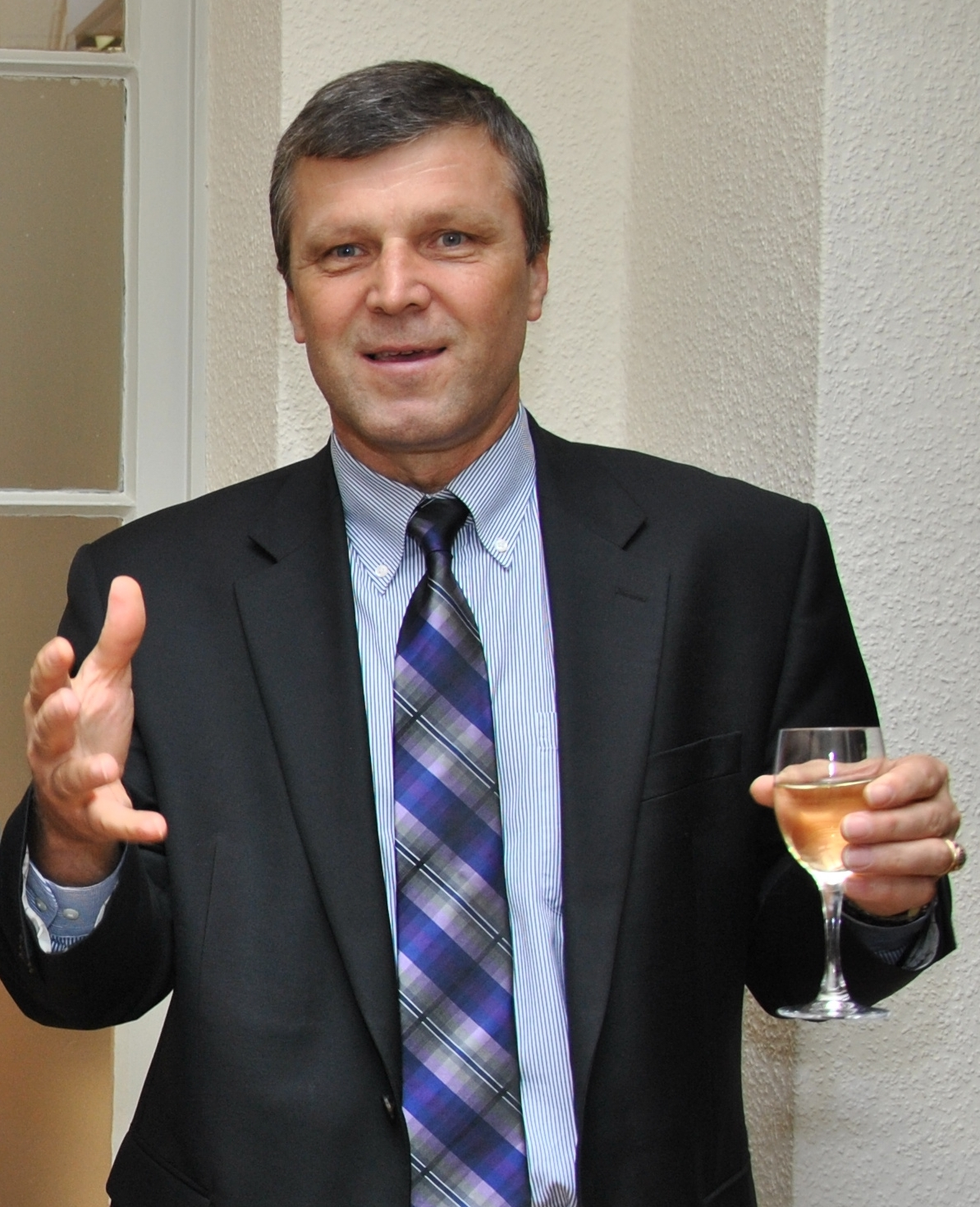
Šťastný in 2011

Šťastný served as general manager for the Slovak national team from 2002 to 2005. The team won their first major championship with the 2002 IIHF World Championship, which won the gold medal.

Šťastný has always been known for his resentment of the Communist regime in Czechoslovakia. He joined the party SDKÚ-DS of the former Prime-minister Mikuláš Dzurinda to pursue a career in the European Parliament since he is fluent in both English and French. He was elected as leader of the 2004 European Parliament candidate list for the SDKU.

In the June 2009 election he was re-elected as the second of his party's MEPs. His campaign slogan was "With Courage and Determination for a Strong Slovakia" (Slovak: S odvahou a nasadením pre silné Slovensko). He was MEP until 2014.

He is a signatory of the Prague Declaration on European Conscience and Communism.

=== Široký controversy ===
Šťastný has called for Juraj Široký to step-down as the President of Slovak Ice Hockey Federation, stating poor performance, pursuing own financial interests over the welfare of Slovak Hockey as well as moral incredibility after it was revealed that Mr Široký was former ŠtB officer and he still has not sufficiently explained his friendship and involvement with Viktor Kožený and his fraudulent financial manoeuvres regarding so-called Harvard Funds. These grievances were penned in a letter to René Fasel in a letter describing Široký as a threat to democracy and integrity of the game in March 2008, as a result of Široký's actions in the 1980s (during which time Peter and two of his brothers had defected to Canada). Three months later, with Široký having not resigned from HC Slovan Bratislava, for whom Šťastný had played prior to his defection to Canada, or the Slovak Ice Hockey Federation, Šťastný resigned from the Slovak Hockey Hall of Fame as a result, and had all references to him pulled from Samsung Arena, the home arena of Slovan at the time.

== International play ==
Šťastný joined the Czechoslovakia national team in 1976, often playing with his brothers Marian and Anton on the same line. He played with the team once in the Olympics, where the team finished fifth at the 1980 Winter Olympics in Lake Placid. In April 1984, Peter and Anton, alongside their wives, became Canadian citizens. He subsequently played for the Canadian team at the Canada Cup months later, where they defeated Sweden in the finals.

When Czechoslovakia broke up into the Czech Republic and Slovakia, Šťastný played for the Slovakia men's national ice hockey team. Serving as team captain, they quickly qualified for the 1994 Winter Olympics in Lillehammer. He served as the national flag bearer during the opening ceremony. They won their group and made it to the quarterfinals but lost to Russia in that round.

Medal record

Ice hockey

Representing Czechoslovakia

World Championships
Gold medal – first place	1976 Poland	
Gold medal – first place	1977 Austria	
Silver medal – second place	1978 Czechoslovakia	
Silver medal – second place	1979 Soviet Union	

Representing Canada

Canada Cup
Gold medal – first place	1984 Canada	

== Awards and achievements ==
- Calder Memorial Trophy – 1981
- NHL All-Star Game – 1981, 1982, 1983, 1984, 1986, 1988
- World Championships Best Forward Award – 1995
- Inducted into Hockey Hall of Fame in 1998
- Inducted into the IIHF Hall of Fame in 2000

== Legacy ==
A stellar player that was beloved in Quebec City by the fans, when Šťastný retired, he was one of only nineteen players to record 400 goals and 700 assists in NHL history and one of only four players with seven 100-point seasons. His 70 assists as a rookie is still an NHL record. Šťastný was the first player in ice hockey history to represent three countries in three international tournaments. He was inducted into the Hockey Hall of Fame in 1998 alongside former linemate Michel Goulet in a ceremony held on November 16, 1998. They were the first Hall of Famers to earn their credentials primarily with the Nordiques, prior to the franchise relocating to become the Colorado Avalanche.

He was ranked number 56 on The Hockey News' list of the 100 Greatest Hockey Players, the highest-ranking Slovak-trained (or Czechoslovak-trained) player in 1998. He was inducted into both the Slovak Hockey Hall of Fame (2002) and the Czech Ice Hockey Hall of Fame (2010), although he voluntarily quit the former under protest of Slovak management of the hockey team. In 2022, he was named by the The Athletic as the 56th best player of the NHL modern era.

== Career statistics ==
=== Regular season and playoffs ===
			Regular season					Playoffs
Season	Team	League	GP	G	A	Pts	PIM	GP	G	A	Pts	PIM
1974–75	Slovan ChZJD Bratislava	TCH Jr	—	—	—	—	—	—	—	—	—	—
1975–76	Slovan ChZJD Bratislava	TCH	32	19	9	28	—	—	—	—	—	—
1976–77	Slovan ChZJD Bratislava	TCH	44	25	27	52	—	—	—	—	—	—
1977–78	Slovan ChZJD Bratislava	TCH	42	29	24	53	28	—	—	—	—	—
1978–79	Slovan ChZJD Bratislava	TCH	39	32	23	55	21	—	—	—	—	—
1979–80	Slovan ChZJD Bratislava	TCH	41	26	26	52	58	—	—	—	—	—
1980–81	Quebec Nordiques	NHL	77	39	70	109	37	5	2	8	10	7
1981–82	Quebec Nordiques	NHL	80	46	93	139	91	12	7	11	18	10
1982–83	Quebec Nordiques	NHL	75	47	77	124	78	4	3	2	5	10
1983–84	Quebec Nordiques	NHL	80	46	73	119	73	9	2	7	9	31
1984–85	Quebec Nordiques	NHL	75	32	68	100	95	18	4	19	23	24
1985–86	Quebec Nordiques	NHL	76	41	81	122	60	3	0	1	1	2
1986–87	Quebec Nordiques	NHL	64	24	53	77	43	13	6	9	15	12
1987–88	Quebec Nordiques	NHL	76	46	65	111	69	—	—	—	—	—
1988–89	Quebec Nordiques	NHL	72	35	50	85	117	—	—	—	—	—
1989–90	Quebec Nordiques	NHL	62	24	38	62	24	—	—	—	—	—
1989–90	New Jersey Devils	NHL	12	5	6	11	16	6	3	2	5	4
1990–91	New Jersey Devils	NHL	77	18	42	60	53	7	3	4	7	2
1991–92	New Jersey Devils	NHL	66	24	38	62	42	7	3	7	10	19
1992–93	New Jersey Devils	NHL	62	17	23	40	22	5	0	2	2	2
1993–94	St. Louis Blues	NHL	17	5	11	16	4	4	0	0	0	2
1993–94	HC Slovan Bratislava	SVK	4	0	4	4	0	—	—	—	—	—
1994–95	St. Louis Blues	NHL	6	1	1	2	0	—	—	—	—	—
TCH totals			198	131	109	240	107	—	—	—	—	—
NHL totals			977	450	789	1,239	824	93	33	72	105	125

=== International ===
Year	Team	Event	GP	G	A	Pts	PIM
1975	Czechoslovakia	WJC	5	3	2	5	—
1975	Czechoslovakia	EJC	5	3	1	4	4
1976	Czechoslovakia	WJC	4	1	1	2	0
1976	Czechoslovakia	WC	9	8	4	12	0
1976	Czechoslovakia	CC	7	0	4	4	2
1977	Czechoslovakia	WC	10	3	5	8	0
1978	Czechoslovakia	WC	10	5	6	11	7
1979	Czechoslovakia	WC	8	2	3	5	6
1980	Czechoslovakia	OLY	6	7	7	14	6
1984	Canada	CC	8	1	2	3	0
1994	Slovakia	OLY	8	5	4	9	9
1995	Slovakia	WC B	6	8	8	16	0
Junior totals			14	7	4	11	—
Senior totals			66	31	35	66	30

== See also ==
- List of NHL statistical leaders
- Notable families in the NHL
- List of NHL players with 1,000 points

== Bibliography ==
- 2003 NHL Official Guide & Record Book, pages 167, 196, 200. Dan Diamond and Associates, Inc. ISBN 0-920445-79-9 (Canada), ISBN 1-57243-500-3 (United States)
- Laflamme, Robert (2012), Les Stastny: Le Coup de Génie de Gilles Léger (in French), Montreal: Hurtubise, ISBN 978-2-89647-873-6

Awards and achievements
Preceded by Vladimír Martinec	Golden Hockey Stick; 1980	Succeeded by Milan Nový
Preceded by Ray Bourque	Winner of the Calder Memorial Trophy; 1981	Succeeded by Dale Hawerchuk
Sporting positions
Preceded by Mario Marois	Quebec Nordiques captain 1985–1990	Succeeded by Steven Finn; Joe Sakic
