= Luizi-Călugăra =

- Commune
- Exaltation of the Holy Cross Catholic Church in Luizi-Călugăra

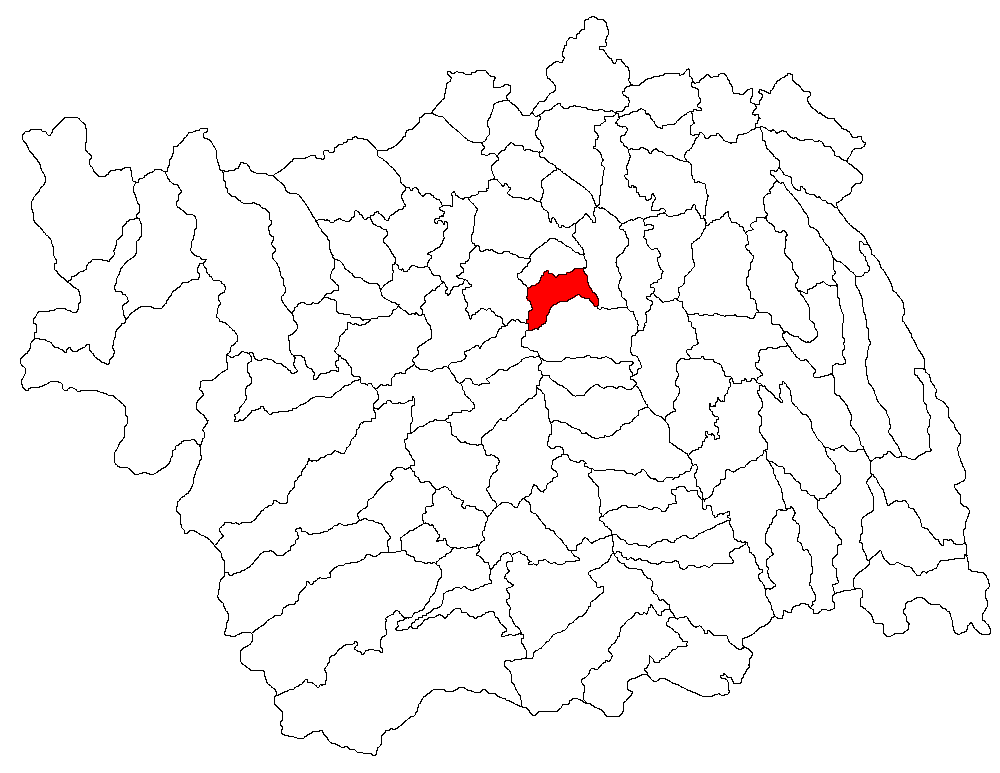
- Location in Bacău County

- Location in Romania
- Coordinates: 46°31′54″N 26°50′35″E
- Country: Romania
- County: Bacău

Government
  - Mayor (2024–2028): Edmond Leonard David (PSD)
- Area: 31.67 km^{2} (12.23 sq mi)
- Elevation: 330 m (1,080 ft)
- Population (2021-12-01): 4,802
  - Density: 151.6/km^{2} (392.7/sq mi)
- Time zone: UTC+02:00 (EET)
  - Summer (DST): UTC+03:00 (EEST)
- Postal code: 607295
- Area code: +(40) 0234
- Vehicle reg.: BC
- Website: comunaluizicalugara.ro

Luizi-Călugăra (Hungarian: Lujzikalagor) is a commune in Bacău County, Western Moldavia, Romania. It is composed of two villages, Luizi-Călugăra and Osebiți.

== History and demographics ==
Luizi-Călugăra was established in the 18th century by Hungarian Catholic settlers. During the 20th century, Romanianization linguistically assimilated the Hungarian population. At the 2002 census, 99.7% of inhabitants declared themselves as ethnic Romanians, 0.2% as Csángós, and 0.1% as Hungarians; 98.6% were Roman Catholic, 1.1% Romanian Orthodox, and 0.2% Seventh-day Adventist.

== Historical population ==
- 1898 – 1,878 (1,802 Hungarians), Gheorghe I. Lahovary, Marele Dicționar Geografic al României
- 1930 – 1,879 (1,800 Hungarians), Romanian census
- 2002 – 4,590 (5 Hungarians), Romanian census

== Natives ==
- Elena Horvat (born 1958), Olympic rower
