= Lauren Wilkinson (rower) =

Canadian rower (born 1989)

Personal information
- Nationality: Canadian
- Born: October 17, 1989 (age 36) Vancouver, British Columbia, Canada

Sport
- Sport: Rowing
- Club: Burnaby Lake Rowing Club
Medal record
Women's Rowing
Representing Canada
Olympic Games
Silver medal – second place	2012 London	Women's eights
World Championships
Gold medal – first place	2011 Amsterdam	W8+
Silver medal – second place	2014 Amsterdam	W8+
Bronze medal – third place	2015 Aiguebelette	W8+

Lauren Wilkinson (born October 17, 1989) is a Canadian rower. She is a 2 time Olympian. She graduated from Princeton University in 2011 with a degree in Ecology and Evolutionary Biology. During her senior year at Princeton, Wilkinson stroked the crew that won the I Eight event at the 2011 NCAA Championships. Wilkinson attended Crofton House School, graduating in 2007. She was awarded the Alumnae Association's Achievement Award of Crofton House School in 2013.

In 2012, Wilkinson won a silver medal at the London Olympics with her coxed women's eight, and in June 2016, she was officially named to Canada's 2016 Olympic team. At the Rio 2016 Olympic Games, Wilkinson placed 5th in the A Final for the coxed women's eight.

== Personal life ==
Lauren Wilkinson is a younger sister to Jerome and Michael Wilkinson. Jerome Wilkinson rowed at the collegiate and provincial level. Michael Wilkinson also rowed at the 2012 Summer Olympics, who was a member of the Olympic rowing team with Lauren. Parents David and Susan Wilkinson were both national team rowers as well. Lauren first got into rowing at the age of 11, following her brothers into the sport. Wilkinson enjoys photography, reading, and hiking.

== See also ==
- List of Princeton University Olympians
