= Canadian Olympic Committee =

- Country: Canada
- Code: CAN
- Created: 1904
- Recognized: 1907
- Continental Association: PASO
- Headquarters: Toronto, Ontario, Canada
- President: Tricia Smith
- Website: www.olympic.ca

The Canadian Olympic Committee (COC; French: Comité olympique canadien), also known as Team Canada, is a private nonprofit organization that represents Canada at the International Olympic Committee. It is also a member of the Pan American Sports Organization.

== History ==
Canadian athletes first competed at the Olympic Games at Paris 1900 followed by St. Louis 1904, it was not until 1907 that the International Olympic Committee (IOC) officially recognized a National Olympic Committee (NOC) for Canada. The next year, Colonel John Hanbury-Williams was recognized as the chairman of the Canadian Olympic Committee (COC) for the 1908 Summer Olympics in London. Hanbury-Williams became Canada's first IOC member in 1911.

The COC was established to select athletes for the 1908 Summer Olympics, when the Canadian Amateur Athletic Union and the Amateur Athletic Federation of Canada had unsettled differences. J. Howard Crocker was appointed manager of the national team for Canada at the 1908 Summer Olympics, which was first national team organized.

After another Canadian Olympic Committee was created with the purpose of organizing a team for the 1912 Summer Olympics in Stockholm, it was reported that the IOC wanted permanent NOCs. In 1913, the Amateur Athletic Union of Canada (AAU of C) created the Canadian Olympic Association with James Merrick as chairman, a position he held until 1921 when he succeeded Hanbury-Williams as IOC member.

At the 1922 AAU of C general meeting, J. Howard Crocker motioned to establish a standing COC, instead of forming a temporary committee prior to each Olympic Games. The permanent COC was to collaborate with provincial organizations to secure funding, chose athletes to represent Canada, and oversee travel and accommodations for the athletes. Patrick J. Mulqueen was elected president, while Crocker served as the secretary, and Fred Marples as the treasurer. During early years of fundraising, Marples felt that it was the duty of all Canadian citizens to ensure the strongest possible national team was sent the Olympics, and urged contributions from individuals, organizations, and provincial governments.

The COC asked athletic clubs across Canada to arrange competitions to celebrate the 60th anniversary of Canadian Confederation, using the events as trials for the national championships in Toronto in August 1927, and as a selection process of athletes for Canada at the 1928 Summer Olympics.

In November 1936, the AAU of C discussed multiple resolutions for reorganizing the COC. After Crocker and Mulqueen motioned to dissolve the current COC, the AAU of C agreed to establish a special committee to prepare for the next Olympic Games, including the president, secretary, one representative from each AAU of C branch, and one representative from each allied sports governing body in Canada.

In 1937, the organization was renamed the Canadian Olympic Association (COA), but remained within the AAU of C. In 1948, the COC executive was enlarged to have representation from all provinces in Canada. The Canadian Olympic Association replaced the COC by 1952, as a body independent of the AAU of C.

Team Canada has competed at every edition of the Games of the Olympiad since then, with the exception of 1980 Summer Olympics in Moscow. Team Canada has competed at every edition of the Winter Olympic Games, beginning with the first at 1924 Winter Olympics in Chamonix. Team Canada has participated at every edition of the Youth Olympic Games, beginning with the first at 2010 Summer Youth Olympics in Singapore. Team Canada has competed at every edition of the Pan American Games, with the exception of the first at Buenos Aires 1951 because, at the time, countries of the Commonwealth did not participate in the Pan American Sports Congress.

Flag of the Canadian Olympic Committee

In April 2002, the organization was once again renamed the Canadian Olympic Committee, bringing it in line with most other NOCs and making the acronym the same in English and French.

On May 29, 2009, the COC and Barbados Olympic Association signed a memorandum of understanding for co-operation between both bodies. Under the deal, the president of the Canadian Olympic Committee remarked that "Signing this Memorandum of Understanding helps us work even more closely with our colleagues in Barbados to improve sport development for both Barbadian and Canadian athletes and coaches". Prior to the 2010 Winter Olympics, hosted in Vancouver, the COC, Canadian Paralympic Committee, and Sport Canada launched the Own the Podium program.

The deal covers a pledge of both national Olympic committees to develop stronger partnerships between sport federations of Canada and Barbados with athlete development an area of focus. This includes the free exchange of coaches, officials, trainers, judges, experts and scientists for participation in seminars, courses and counselling.

In December 2014, the COC partnered with Egale Canada and the international You Can Play foundation, announcing a program to combat homophobia in sport by addressing LGBT issues as part of its mandate.

In the 2026 Winter Olympics, Canadian athletes did not win a gold medal through the first eight days of competition, the longest span without one since 1988, attracting increasing national consternation and discussions over funding for high-performance sports. As part of the 2026 spring economic statement, Mark Carney's government announced more than $750 million in sports-related funding in response to a decline in investment.

== List of presidents ==
- John Hanbury-Williams, 1907–1911
- James Merrick, 1911–1921
- Patrick J. Mulqueen, 1922–1946
- Andrew Sidney Dawes, 1946–1953
- Kenneth Farmer, 1953–1961
- James Worrall, 1961–1968
- Howard Radford, 1968–1969
- Harold Wright, 1969–1977
- Dick Pound, 1977–1982
- Roger Jackson, 1982–1990
- Carol Anne Letheren, 1990–1994
- Wayne Hellquist, 1994
- William J. Warren, 1994–2001
- Michael A. Chambers, 2001–2010
- Marcel Aubut, 2010–2015
- Tricia Smith, 2015–present

== See also ==
- Canada at the Olympics
- Canadian Paralympic Committee
- Commonwealth Sport Canada
- Canada at the Commonwealth Games
- Canada at the Pan American Games

== Sources ==
- Keyes, Mary Eleanor (October 1964). John Howard Crocker LL. D., 1870–1959 (Thesis). London, Ontario: University of Western Ontario. OCLC 61578234.
