= Crofton House School =

Private school in Vancouver, British Columbia

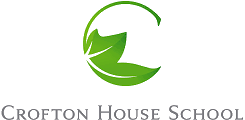

Location
- 3200 West 41st Avenue; Vancouver, British Columbia, V6N 3E1; Canada; 49.2345°N 123.1770°W

Information
- School type: Independent
- Motto: "Servabo Fidem" ("Keep the Faith")
- Founded: 1898
- Head of School: Ena Harrop
- Grades: K–12
- Enrollment: 708
- Language: English
- Colours: Navy, Green and White
- Mascot: Falcon
- Team name: Crofton Falcons
- Symbol: Ivy leaf
- Website: www.croftonhouse.ca
- Last updated: October 9, 2018

Crofton House School, in the neighbourhood of Kerrisdale in Vancouver, British Columbia, Canada, is a private university-preparatory school for girls that is tied for first place in the Fraser Institute's rankings of schools in British Columbia.

== History ==
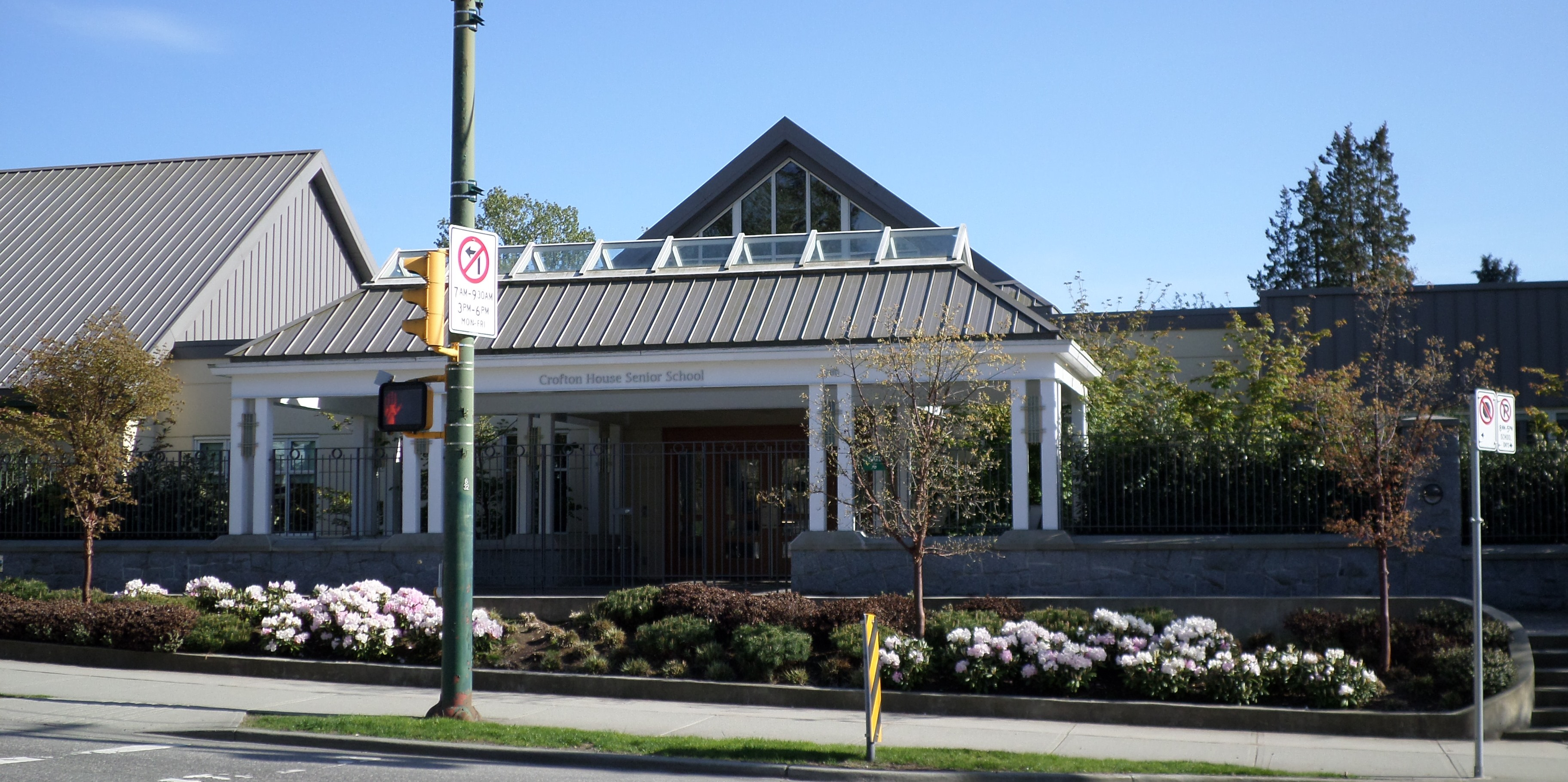
Crofton House Senior School in May 2017

Crofton House School was founded in 1898 by the Gordon sisters, Jessie Fisher Gordon LL.D. and Mary Elizabeth Gordon, in the Gordons' family home on Georgia Street, Vancouver, with four girls. Three years later, in 1901, the school moved to the corner of Jervis and Nelson in the West End.

The ivy leaf, the emblem of the Gordon clan, was chosen as the school emblem, and the motto became "servabo fidem" (I shall keep faith). Crofton was a boarding school until 1990. The old boarding house is now used as the main administrative building, called "The Old Residence".

In 1937, the Misses Gordon retired and Crofton House School became an educational trust. Sara E.G. Macdonald became Headmistress and in 1942, the school moved to the present 10-acre (4 ha) site on West 41st Avenue in Kerrisdale. On the day of its 90th birthday, the school received its own coat of arms, granted by the Lord Lyon. To mark this occasion the Rev. Dr. T. Herbert O'Driscoll wrote a hymn for the school, "We Thank You Lord For all the Years".

== Senior school ==
In mathematics, French, English, Spanish, Mandarin and the sciences, students who demonstrate high ability are given the opportunity to accelerate their programs, finishing grade 12 in their eleventh year. This allows them to pursue an enriched board authority/authorized course designed to meet students' interests in economics, world history, calculus, European history, English language, literature, physics, chemistry, French, Spanish, Chinese, and human geography. The Senior School also offers Advanced Placement courses to grade 11 and 12 students.

Until the 2010-2011 school year, the Senior School year was divided into three terms. The school has since shifted to an accumulative marking system. Report cards and student profiles are sent home at the end of each term. Electives - including art, drama, music, food studies, IT and textiles - at the grade 8 level are compulsory quarter courses, while electives at the grade 9 and 10 levels are student-chosen half-year courses.

== Junior school ==
The junior school housed students from grades 1 through 6 until the 2004–2005 school year. Grade 7 was then transitioned down to join the junior school.

== ECE Centre ==
The ECE Centre (Early Childhood Education Centre) houses students aged 4 and 5 in junior kindergarten and senior kindergarten.

== Student Life ==
=== Student Leadership ===
Crofton House offers several leadership opportunities throughout all grades, but are especially prevalent in the Senior School. Similar to other independent schools, Crofton House maintains a group of prefects and a Head Girl, dubbed the "Student Executive." The Student Executive is re-elected yearly via vote from the Senior School and are responsible for planning key events, representing their peers in discussion with administration, and bring new initiatives forward.

House Council is made up of 6 captains in total and two House Council representatives per grade for each house. Every student within the Senior School is sorted into one of these six houses — Douglas (Green), Fraser (Purple), Gordon (Yellow), McDougall (Navy), Stuart (Red), and Wallace (light blue). The House Council helps foster school spirit by organizing house activities such as Winter Games, House Plays, and Sports Day.

Students in the Senior School elect two Student Council representatives for their grade level each year. These representatives have the responsibility of discussing student issues and concerns, bringing forward initiatives, and coordinating events.

=== Clubs ===
Students in both the Junior and Senior schools have the opportunity to participate in a large variety of clubs and co-curricular programs.

Junior School

Some of the clubs and programs offered in the Junior School include:

- Fun in French
- Science Club
- Crofton Chronicle Reporters
- Improv Club
- Nature Explorers
- Debate
- Primary and Intermediate Concert Choirs
- Middle School Musical/Theatre Production
- Watercolour Wonders
- Clay Creations
- Photography
- Cooking Club

Senior School

Some of the clubs and programs offered in the Senior School include:

- STEM Club
- Tech Crew
- Robotics
- Ambassadors Program
- Junior Peer Tutoring
- GSA (Gender and Sexuality Awareness)
- Model United Nations
- Social Responsibility Club
- Business Club
- Debate
- Concert Choir
- Stage Band
- House Plays
- Drama Club
- Senior School Musical/Theatre Production
- Creative Writing
- Studio 65 (Art Club)
- Sew What's Cooking

=== Arts ===
Students in the Senior School experience both curriculum-based and co-curricular arts education. Students are offered the opportunity to participate in various musical ensembles, such as the school's choir, stage band, concert band, and orchestra. Additionally, grades 8-9 and grades 10-12 each stage an annual production.

== Uniform ==
Crofton students wear the Gordon tartan, in honour of the school's founders, the Misses Jessie and Mary Gordon.

== Athletics ==
Crofton House offers a variety of recreational and competitive athletics programs.

Junior School Athletics (Grades 3-7)

Beginning in Grade 3, Junior School students have the opportunity to join athletics teams, including regularly scheduled practices and games. Students in Grade 6 and above are offered the opportunity to join Lunch League, an in-house league with solely games and a championship game at the end of the term.

The Junior School athletics teams include:

- Fall Season Sports: Field Hockey, Cross Country, and Volleyball
- Winter Season Sports: Basketball, Fitness Challenge
- Spring Season Sports: Track & Field

Senior School Athletics (Grades 8-12)

In the Senior School, there is an greater emphasis on competition and athletic ability than in the Junior School. More than half of Senior School girls participate in at least one sport.

The Senior School athletics teams include:

- Fall Season Sports: Cross Country, Field Hockey, and Volleyball
- Winter Season Sports: Basketball
- Spring Season Sports: Badminton, Track & Field, Soccer, Rowing, and Tennis

== Notable alumnae ==
- Joyce Cheng, singer and actress
- Dolores Claman, composer of the theme song to Hockey Night in Canada
- Kit Pearson, Canadian children's and young adult author
- Emily Perkins, actress
- Patricia Taylor, wife of William F. Buckley
- Lycia Trouton artist
- Samantha Lam, 2008 Beijing Olympian, Equestrian Show Jumper
- Rebecca Marino, professional tennis player
- Lauren Wilkinson, Olympic medalist, Rowing
- Alexandra Oliver, poet
- Kerry-Lynne Findlay, politician

== Arms ==
Coat of arms of Crofton House School

Notes
Granted 22 December 1987 by the Lord Lyon King of Arms.
Crest
A chaplet composed of thistle flowers and dogwood flowers Proper environing the dexter forearm of a young woman paleways Proper grasping a torch Or enflamed Gules.
Escutcheon
Argent on a fess Azure between two ivy leaves Vert a boar’s head couped Or armed Argent langued Gules between two open books Or.
Motto
Servabo Fidem (I Will Keep The Faith)
