= Gilles Leger =

Canadian ice hockey coach (1941–2024)

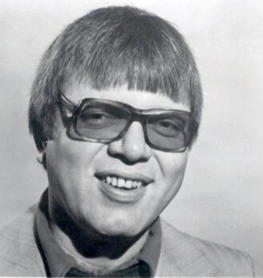
- Leger in 1978 photo
- Born: July 16, 1941; Cornwall, Ontario, Canada
- Died: August 6, 2024 (aged 83); Mississauga, Ontario, Canada
- Occupations: Ice hockey coach, scout, and executive
- Years active: 1967–2020
- Employer(s): Ottawa Nationals; Toronto Toros; Birmingham Bulls; Quebec Nordiques; Edmonton Oilers; New York Rangers

Gilles Leger (July 16, 1941 – August 6, 2024) was a Canadian ice hockey coach, scout, and executive. Although a talented Canadian football player, Leger chose to dedicate his life to hockey. From 1967 to 1972, he coached the St. Francis Xavier University squad before he was hired as an assistant coach with the Ottawa Nationals. He had brief head coaching stints Toronto Toros and Birmingham Bulls, then moved on to serve as general manager of the latter club.

Following his coaching roles, Leger held a series of front-office jobs. From 1979 until 1983, he was the director of player development for the Quebec Nordiques. In August 1980, Leger was unexpectedly contacted by telephone through his NHL office phone number by Slovak hockey player Peter Šťastný, who was attending a European tournament in Innsbruck, Austria. Šťastný and his pregnant wife Darina wished to defect, along with his brother Anton, and Šťastný specifically wished to play for the Nordiques, as they had drafted Anton the year before. Leger agreed to help the Šťastný family, and immediately flew to Austria with team president Marcel Aubut. They instructed the Šťastný family make their way from Innsbruck to Vienna, where they sought political asylum at the Canadian embassy before flying to Canada. Peter Šťastný then signed with the Nordiques the following day, and went on to win the Calder Trophy for Rookie of the Year and have a long and successful NHL career, and a year later Šťastný's older brother Marián followed them to Quebec, also successfully defecting. Leger's work with the Nordiques marked the first time during the Cold War that an NHL team's front office had chosen to aid Eastern Bloc players in defecting to Canada and the United States to come play in the West for NHL teams. Later notable defections would include NHL stars such as Alexander Mogilny and Sergei Fedorov.

He then became president of the Fredericton Express and Halifax Citadels American Hockey League teams and the QMJHL Quebec Remparts. He later served as a scout for several NHL clubs, including the Edmonton Oilers and New York Rangers. Leger died on August 6, 2024, in Mississauga at the age of 83.

== WHA coaching record ==
Team	Year	Regular season						Postseason
Team	Year	G	W	L	T	Pts	Division rank	Result
Toronto Toros	1975-76	26	9	17	0	(18)	5th in Canadian	Missed playoffs
Birmingham Bulls	1976-77	24	7	16	1	(14)	5th in East	(Moved to GM's role)
WHA totals	1975-1977	50	16	33	1	33		0-0 (0.000)
