= Marcel Aubut =

Canadian ice hockey team owner

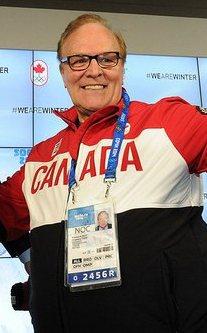
- Born: January 5, 1948 (age 78); Saint-Hubert-de-Rivière-du-Loup, Quebec, Canada
- Occupation: Lawyer
- Known for: President and Chief Executive Officer of the Quebec Nordiques

Marcel Aubut, OC OQ KC (born January 5, 1948) is a Canadian lawyer, former president of the Canadian Olympic Committee and former president and chief executive officer of the Quebec Nordiques of the National Hockey League (NHL). He was a board member of many businesses and organizations.

He is currently a Quebec City-based lawyer at M.A. Droit & Stratégie d'affaires inc. He previously worked at Heenan Blaikie and BCF.

== Personal life ==
Born in Saint-Hubert-de-Rivière-du-Loup in Rivière-du-Loup Regional County Municipality, Quebec, the son of Roland Aubut and Omérine Proulx, Aubut received a Bachelor of Arts degree from the Académie de Québec in 1968, a Bachelor of Law degree from Université Laval in 1970, and a Master of Law degree in 1975 from Université Laval. He was called to the Quebec Bar in 1972 and was created a Queen's Counsel in 1987. In 1970, he married Francine Vallée. They had three children: Mélanie, Julie and Catherine.

== Honours ==
In 1986, he was made a Member of the Order of Canada and was promoted to Officer in 1993. In 2006, he was made an Officer of the National Order of Quebec. In 1999, he was inducted into Canada's Sports Hall of Fame.

== Quebec Nordiques and hockey ==
He was a member of the National Hockey League's Board of Governors. He is the former president of the Canadian Olympic Committee.

Along with the Quebec Nordiques' director of player development Gilles Leger, Aubut was also instrumental in the defections of the Slovak skaters Anton, Marian and Peter Šťastný from communist Czechoslovakia to play for the Nordiques. It was the first time during the Cold War that an NHL team's front office had chosen to aid Eastern Bloc players in defecting to Canada and the United States to come play in the West for NHL teams.

When the Nordiques drafted future NHL superstar Eric Lindros in the 1991 NHL entry draft as their first overall selection, Lindros refused to play for the team, eventually leading to an unusual holdout and resolution known as the Eric Lindros trade. In a 2016 interview, it was later revealed by Lindros that his decision was based entirely on Aubut's behavior, explaining, "The decision to not play for Quebec was based solely on the owner. It had nothing to do with language, culture, [or] city. Keep in mind, my wife is French [from Quebec]. I was not going to play for that individual – period." One particular meeting between Aubut and the Lindros family only led to more cold feelings between the two sides when Aubut reportedly made a rude and sexually charged comment in French about Lindros' mother Bonnie, not realizing that she was bilingual and knew the language.

Aubut was president of the Nordiques when the team was sold to an American communications company and moved to Denver in 1995, becoming the Colorado Avalanche. Maclean's magazine reported that Aubut personally made $15 million from the sale and that T-shirts reading "Marcel Aubut: Wanted Dead or Alive" were not an uncommon sight in Quebec City at the time.

Recently, he proposed Quebec City as home of a new NHL team. Aubut argued that with the new NHL collective bargaining agreement and the coming 400th anniversary of Quebec City in 2008, the city could build a new arena or a stadium.

On October 9, 2009, Aubut met with NHL commissioner Gary Bettman. The meeting reportedly dealt with plans for a new Quebec arena. The unofficial details were that the city of Quebec was a leading candidate for a new franchise or one for relocation. However, no NHL team has come back to Quebec as of 2026.

== Canadian Olympic Committee ==
Aubut was named a member at large of the Canadian Olympic Committee (COC) in 2000, and was elected to the Board of Governors and executive committee in 2005. In 2009, he was voted in as President-elect of the COC, taking over from Michael A. Chambers following the 2010 Winter Olympics in the spring of 2010. Aubut was the first francophone ever elected President of the COC.

During his time as president, Aubut greatly raised the profile of Canada's Olympic athletes and expanded the COC's operations, with corresponding increases in revenues and expenditures supporting amateur sport. In 2014 Aubut was acclaimed to a second four-year term as president. He served as a member of the Board of the organizing committee for the 2010 Winter Olympic Games in Vancouver and the 2015 Pan American Games in Toronto, and was appointed to the International Relations Commission of the International Olympic Committee.

On September 25, 2015, the COC received a complaint from a staff member at the Canadian Olympic Foundation alleging sexual harassment by Aubut. One week later, two other women came forward with allegations and the investigation was expanded. The Foundation, a charitable organization that raises money for Olympic sport, shares office space with the COC in Toronto. On September 30, 2015, Aubut and the COC announced that he would step aside as President of the COC and Chair of the Foundation while the COC investigation into the matter was conducted. The COC engaged retired Quebec Superior Court justice François Rolland as an independent investigator. After more allegations against Aubut appeared in the press, Aubut resigned as President of the COC on October 3, 2015.

== See also ==
- Eric Lindros trade
- Misogyny in ice hockey
