= Ottawa Dragon Boat Festival =

Annual boating festive, Canada

The Ottawa Dragon Boat Festival is an annual festival of dragon boat races in Ottawa, Ontario, Canada. Begun in 1994, the festival attracts 5,500 paddlers, 200 teams and over 75,000 spectators from all around the world. It is one of the largest dragon boat festivals in North America. The event is held in Mooney's Bay, where the Rideau River and Rideau Canal split. Mooney's Bay is where many of the Ottawa-based teams train, using the Rideau Canoe Club facilities. The festival was most recently held in 2019. The 2020 and 2021 festivals were cancelled due to the COVID-19 pandemic. 2022 saw the return of the festival but the number of participants was less than pre pandemic years.

In 1998, the Charity Cup Challenge was added as a fundraising component for the Ottawa Dragon Boat Foundation. Founded in 2004 as a way to raise funds for local charities. The challenge has raised over CA$4 million in support of 41 charities. The festival has also initiated a number of eco-friendly projects, making it both the first carbon-neutral festival in North America and the first Ecologo-certified festival in the world.

== Races ==
Races take place over the Saturday and Sunday with teams divided into three categories, Mixed, Women and Open. They may involve 16-20 paddlers, one drummer, one steersperson and up to six spares. Teams race a minimum of two 500m races on Saturday and the top 75 mixed, 32 women's and eight open teams will advance to Sunday where they will compete in three additional - 100m, 200m and 500m races.

=== Challenge cups ===
The festival also has 25 Challenge Cups divided into four categories. These are designed to increase competition between teams from different corporate and community groups.

- Corporate Challenge Cup
- Community Challenge Cup
- Women's Challenge Cup
- DBC/Sport Division Cup

Some notable races within these divisions include:

- Breast Cancer Survivors Cup - Breast Cancer Survivor teams compete in a ceremonial race followed by the Flower Ceremony, a tradition that provides a moment to remember and honour those who have been lost to breast cancer and those who are still fighting. Friends, families and supporters are all welcome to join us this special evening, followed by a Breast Cancer Survivor Reception.
- Charity Challenge Cup - Top fundraising teams from each category compete for the Charity Challenge Cup. Designed to promote fundraising for the Ottawa Dragon Boat Foundation.
- Sue Holloway Cup - Named after four-time Olympian and Canada Sports Hall of Famer Sue Holloway. Teams registered with Dragon Boat Canada compete to earn DBC qualifying points.

== Festival events ==
The Ottawa Dragon Boat Festival is part of a larger Chinese cultural tradition that goes back 2,400 years. It began on the life-sustaining riverbanks in the valleys of southern China as a fertility rite performed to ensure bountiful crops. The first participants held their celebration on the fifth day of the lunar month of the Chinese calendar. The race was held to avert misfortune and encourage the rains needed for prosperity. The object of their worship was the dragon.

Cultural and heritage performers are featured at the festival and are included prominently during the opening and closing festivities. Select performances are designed to honour the traditions and cultural roots of dragon boating as well as the cultural diversity that makes up the National Capital Region.

=== Opening ceremony ===
The opening ceremony is presented on the Friday of each festival weekend with cultural tourist attractions like the Royal Canadian Mounted Police Pipe and Drum band. The Parade of Champions is similar in concept to the Olympics' Parade of Nations. Numerous dignitaries attend, including the mayor of Ottawa. Other special guests include CTV Ottawa media personalities and other prominent members of the Ottawa community. Past performers include The Success Lion Dance Troupe, which celebrates a 3000-year-old tradition that symbolizes prosperity, luck and happiness, and The Oto-Wa Taiko Japanese drummers.

=== Eye dotting ===
An essential dragon boat tradition, the eye dotting ceremony consists of painting the eyes onto a dragon head to awaken it from sleep and symbolizes the start of the festival.

=== Entertainment ===
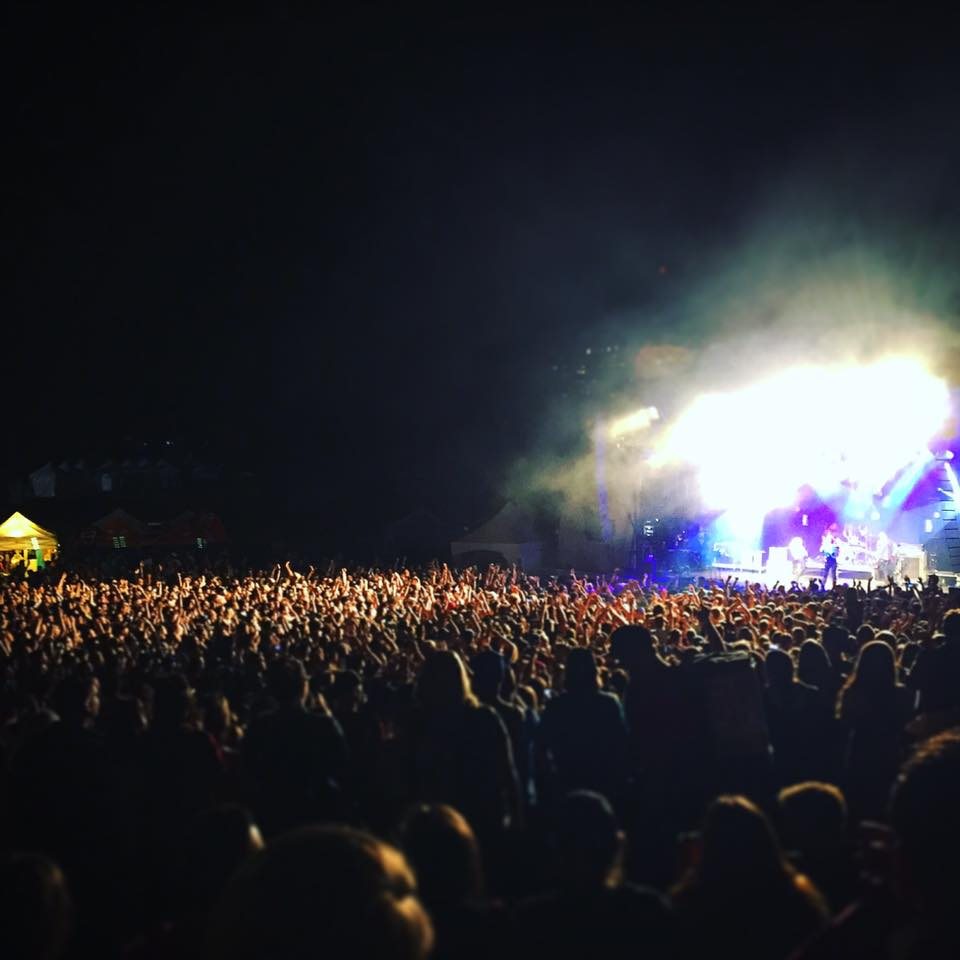
Concert spectators at the 2016 festival

Each year, the festival provides a series of free concerts with a focus on showcasing talent local to the Ottawa region and Canada. Notable acts have included Sam Roberts, Broken Social Scene, Matt Mays and The Sheepdogs. The festival also has strolling performers, food vendors, artisans, exhibitors and cultural performances.
