= Iris Völkner =

German rower (born 1960)

Medal record

Women's rowing

Representing West Germany

Olympic Games
Bronze medal – third place	1984 Los Angeles	Coxless pairs

Iris Völkner (born 16 October 1960 in Hamburg) is a German rower.
