= Ruth Howe =

British rower

Personal information
- Nationality: British
- Born: 14 May 1959 (age 65); Tavistock, England

Sport
- Sport: Rowing
- Club: Lea Rowing Club

Ruth Howe (born 14 May 1959) is a British rower. She competed in the women's coxless pair event at the 1984 Summer Olympics. She was part of the coxless pairs with Jackie Prout that won the national title rowing for a Lea Rowing Club and Sons of the Thames composite at the 1986 National Championships. She was a member of the eight that won the national title rowing for a A.R.A squad at the 1987 National Championships.
