= Elena Horvat =

Romanian rower (born 1958)

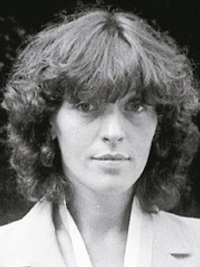
- Horvat in the 1980s

Personal information
- Born: 4 July 1958 (age 67) Luizi-Călugăra, Romania
- Height: 179 cm (5 ft 10 in)
- Weight: 74 kg (163 lb)

Sport
- Sport: Rowing
- Club: CSA Steaua București
Medal record
Representing Romania
Olympic Games
Gold medal – first place	1984 Los Angeles	Coxless pair
World Rowing Championships
Bronze medal – third place	1981 Munich	Coxless pair
Bronze medal – third place	1982 Lucerne	Coxed four
Silver medal – second place	1983 Duisburg	Coxless pair
Gold medal – first place	1985 Hazewinkel	Coxless pair

Elena Horvat (Hungarian: Ilona Horváth, later Florea, born 4 July 1958) is a retired Romanian rower. She is a world champion and Olympic gold medallist in the coxless pair.

Horvat was born in Luizi-Călugăra in Bacău County in 1958. She moved to Bucharest at a young age but two sisters still live in her home village. Initially a member of Viitorul București, she later joined CSA Steaua București. She went to the 1980 Summer Olympics in Moscow as a reserve rower but did not get to compete.

Horvat competed at the 1984 Olympics and won a gold medal in the coxless pair. At world championships, she won one gold, one silver and two bronze medals between 1981 and 1985.
