= Ellen Becker =

German rower (born 1960)

Personal information
- Born: 3 August 1960 (age 66) Duisburg, North Rhine-Westphalia
Medal record
Women's rowing
Representing West Germany
Olympic Games
Bronze medal – third place	1984 Los Angeles	Coxless pairs

Ellen Becker (born 3 August 1960 in Duisburg) is a German rower.
