= Rideau Canoe Club =

Canoe club in Ottawa, Ontario, Canada

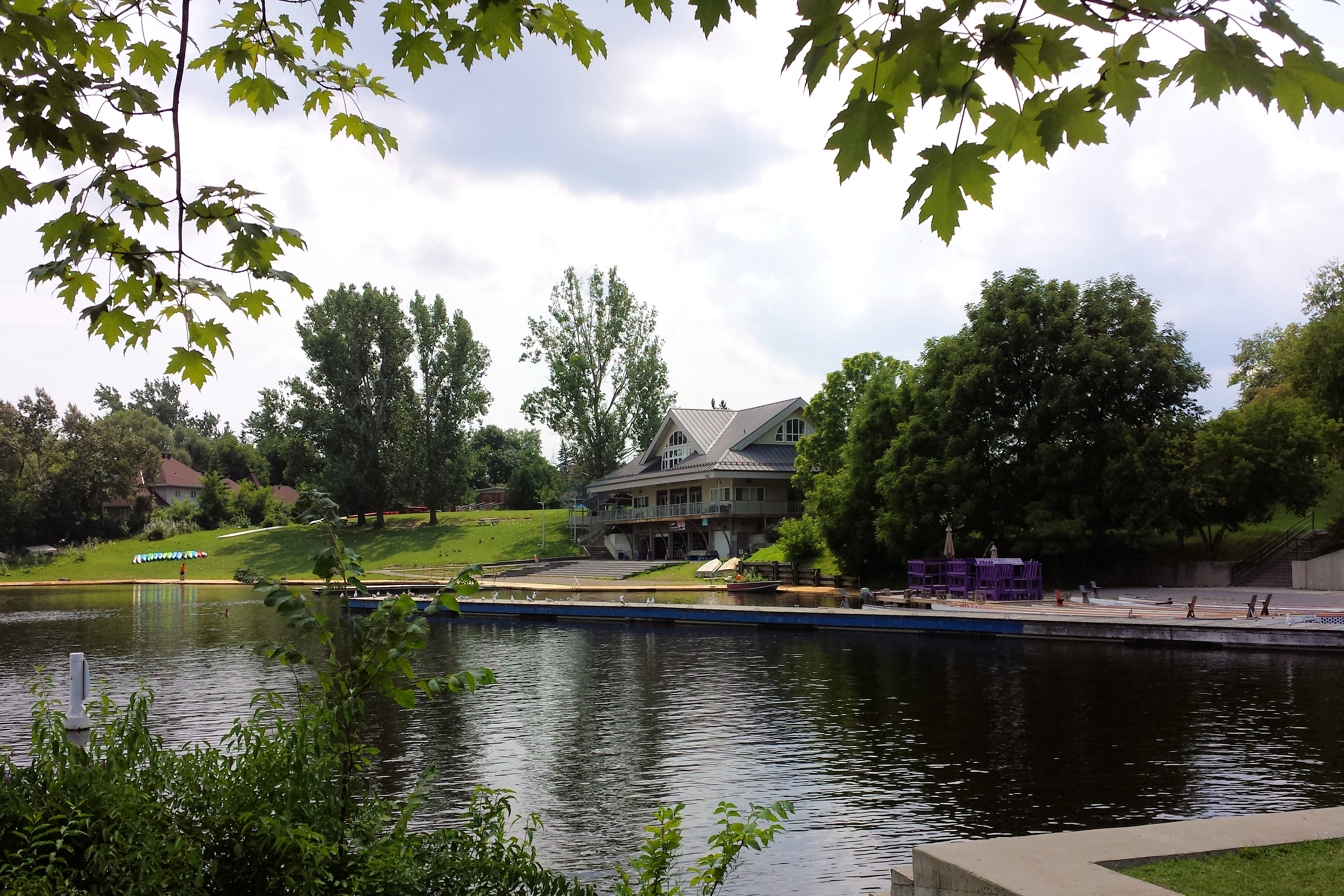
- Rideau Canoe Club facility on the Rideau River
- Abbreviation: RCC
- Formation: 1902
- Legal status: active
- Location: Ottawa, Ontario, Canada
- Coordinates: 45.36895°N 75.69893°W
- Official language: English, French
- Commodore: Fiona Smith-Bradley
- Website: www.rideaucanoeclub.ca
- Formerly called: Rideau Aquatic Club

The Rideau Canoe Club (RCC) is a canoe club located on the Rideau River in Ottawa, Ontario, Canada. The club is located at Mooney's Bay, where the Rideau Canal splits away from the river prior to joining up with the Ottawa River.

== History ==
The club was founded in 1902 as the Rideau Aquatic Club with a clubhouse on the Rideau Canal near the Exhibition Grounds designed by Moses Chamberlain Edey in 1904–5.

A memorial brass plaque on a flag pole is dedicated to the memory of the members who fell during the First World War. In 1981, this memorial was rededicated to include the members of the Club who fell during the Second World War.

The clubhouse was on the canal at Fifth Avenue in the Glebe until the 1940s, when it was destroyed by winter ice. In 1946, the club reorganized as the Rideau Canoe Club and in the following year, relocated to its current location at Mooney's Bay. Club facilities include a clubhouse with five boat bays and a repair shop, and two 'annex' boat storage buildings set somewhat back from the water. The club is directly adjacent to a set of locks on the Rideau Canal. A book on the history of the club has been written by lifetime member Mike Scott.

In June 2009, it was announced that the RCC was to receive funding for an expansion project. The governments of Canada, Ontario and Ottawa each contributed up to $594,000. Additional funding was raised by the club for a total project cost of more than $2.3 million. The current facility officially opened on September 3, 2010, accommodating more programming for educational and day-camp operations and training for athletes from beginners to Olympians. The facility is also fully accessible to visitors and athletes with disabilities. The new lounge in the club house was named the Mike Scott Lounge after his extensive community service and extraordinary community service record.

== Programs ==
Traditional events include K-1, K-2, K-4, C-1, C-2, C-4 (Canadian and International) and C-15 (War Canoe), where a K-2 is a 2-person kayak and C-4 is a 4-person canoe, etc. Several programs are offered, encompassing children and teenagers of varying experience and skill levels, high-performance paddlers, and Masters paddlers (age 25 and up). Rideau traditionally hosts a Canada Day regatta, drawing high-performance athletes from across Canada and the United States. Dragon Boat practices are frequently held at the club and the Ottawa Dragon Boat Race Festival is held on the club's course, with visiting teams setting up across the river. The club also offers courses in more conventional recreational canoes, kayaks and stand up paddle boards, and is the venue for the Head of the Rideau rowing regatta, held annually in late September by the Ottawa Rowing Club.

== Notable successes ==
The club has won the overall Canadian Championship eleven times: 1923, 1925, 1927, 1973, 1985, 2002, 2015, 2018, 2019, 2021 and 2022.

10 Olympians have originated from Rideau, including Frank Amyot, Claudia Hunt, Sue Holloway, Karen Tippett, Renn Crichlow, Angus Mortimer, Rhys Hill, Kristin Gauthier, Madeline Schmidt, and Toshka Besharah-Hrebacka.

The Rideau Canoe Club has seen much success on the international stage, including at the Olympic Games, the ICF Junior and U23 World Championships, ICF Senior World Championships, World Cups, and Olympic Hopes regattas.
