= Oliver (given name) =

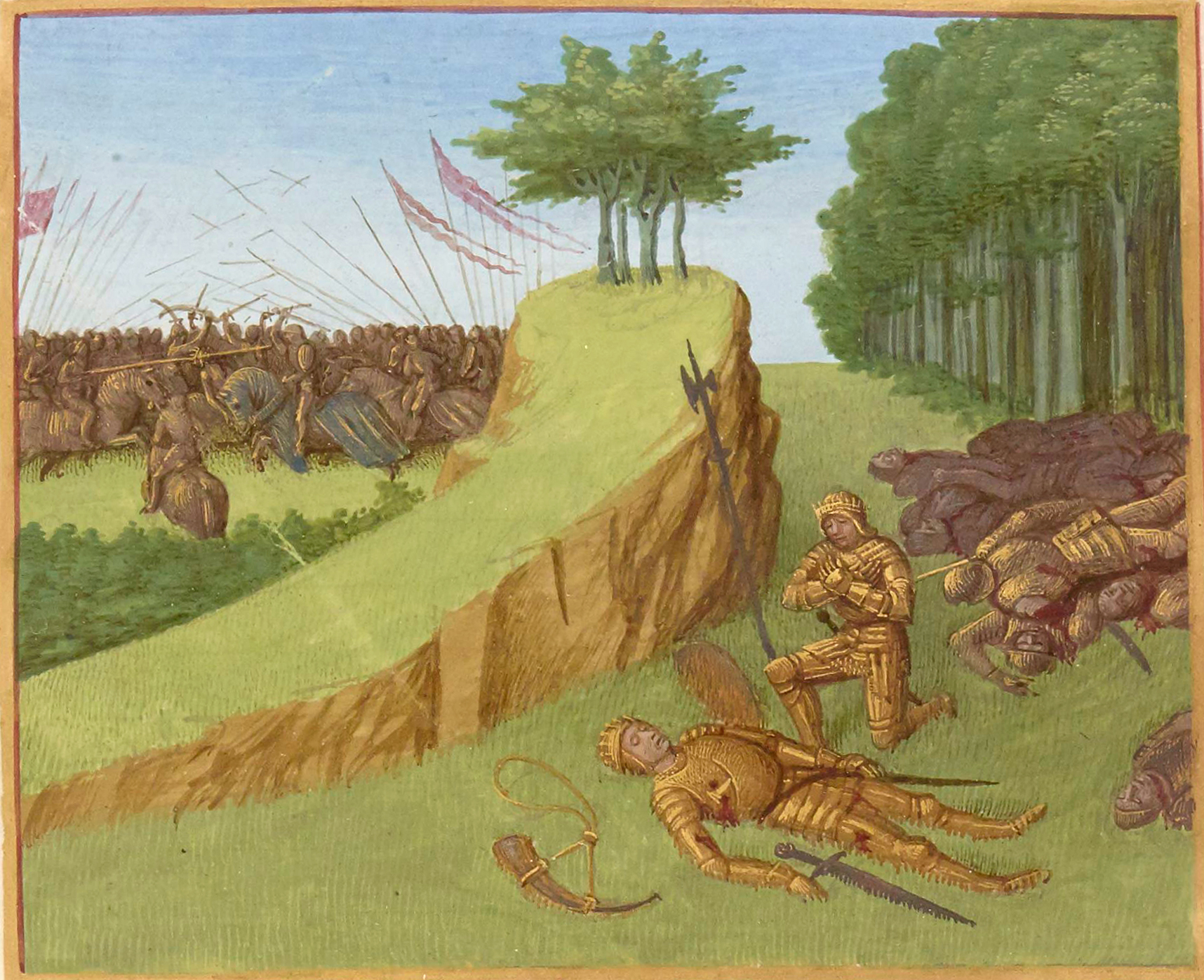
- Mort de Roland, depicting the death of Roland in The Song of Roland. One part of the story tells how Roland's best friend Oliver died with him.
- Pronunciation: US: /ˈɑl.ɪ.vəɹ/, UK: /ˈɒl.ɪ.və/, German: [ˈoː.li.vɐ], Finnish: [ˈo.li.ʋer], Catalan: [u.ɫi.ˈβe], Czech: [ˈo.lɪ.vɛr], Slovak: [ˈɔ.li.vɛr]
- Gender: masculine
- Language: English
- Name day: July 11 (Austria), July 1 (Croatia), October 2 (Czech Republic), May 22 (Estonia), May 29 (Finland), August 3 (Norway), July 7 (Slovakia), April 15 (Sweden)

Other gender
- Feminine: Olivera, Olivette, Oliviera

Origin
- Languages: Old French and English
- Meaning: From Olivier, an Old French form of the Germanic name Alfher (literally "elf army/warrior")
- Region of origin: Medieval France, Medieval England

Other names
- Nicknames: Moll, Noll, Ollie, Olli, Olly, Oli
- Usage: English, German, Swedish, Norwegian, Danish, Finnish, Estonian, Catalan, Serbian, Croatian, Macedonian, Czech, Slovak
- Related names: Olivier, Olivér, Oliwer, Oliwier, Oliviero, Óliver, Oliverio
- Popularity: see popular names

Oliver (Serbian Cyrillic and Macedonian Cyrillic: Оливер) is a masculine given name of Old French and Medieval British origin. The name has been generally associated with the Latin term olivarius, meaning "olive tree planter", or "olive branch bearer". Other proposed origins include the Germanic names *wulfa- "wolf" and *harja- "army", the Old Norse Óleifr (a genuinely West Germanic name, perhaps from ala "all" & wēra "true"—possibly cognate with Álvaro) and the Anglo-Saxon Alfhere.

Oliver is one of Charlemagne's retainers in the 11th-century Song of Roland. The name was introduced to England by the Normans, where its form was possibly influenced again by its Anglo-Saxon cognate Alfhere. It was commonly used in medieval England, but became rare after the Restoration because of the unpopularity of Oliver Cromwell. The name was revived in the 19th century, possibly inspired by the title character of Charles Dickens' Oliver Twist (1838). Pet forms of the English given name include Ollie and, in medieval times, Noll.

Modern variants include French Olivier, Hungarian Olivér, Indonesian Oliver, Irish Oilibhéar or Oilibhéir, Scottish Gaelic Oilbhreis, Portuguese Olivério, Italian Oliviero, Spanish Oliverio, and Polish Oliwier or Oliwer.

In 2015, Oliver was the most popular given name for boys in Australia. From 2013 to 2017, Oliver was the most popular given name for baby boys born in England.

In 2022, in the United States, the name Oliver was given to 15,076 boys, making it the third most popular name. Also in 2022, it was the sixth most popular name given to boys in Canada.

The name Oliver is on the list of the 50 most common male names in Croatia. In 2023, 116 Olivers were born in Croatia, and according to the latest census, there are currently 1,719 people living in Croatia with that name.

== Variants ==
- American English: Ollyver
- Amharic: ኦሊቨር
- Breton: Olier
- Corsican: Ulivieru
- Danish: Olliver
- Dutch: Olivijer, Olivier
- English: Olliver, Olyver
- Faroese: Ólivar, Olivur
- French: Olivier
- Galician: Oliveiros
- Gascon: Oliber, Oliu, Olivièr
- Greek: Ολιβέριος
- Hawaiian: Oliwele
- Hungarian: Olivér
- Icelandic: Óliver, Ólíver
- Indonesian: Oliver
- Irish: Oileabhéar, Oilibhéar
- Italian: Auliver, Oliviero, Olivero, Oliverotto
- Languedocien: Oliu, Olivièr
- Latin: Oliverius
- Latvian: Olifer, Olivers
- Lithuanian: Oliveris
- Maltese: Ulivier
- Māori: Ōriwa
- Norwegian: Olliver
- Old Catalan: Holiver
- Old French: Olivers
- Polish: Oliwier, Oliwer
- Portuguese: Olivério, Oliveiros
- Quebec French: Olier
- Russian: Оливер
- Samoan: Oliva
- Sardinian: Alaverru
- Scottish Gaelic: Oilbhreis
- Spanish: Oliverio, Óliver
- Swedish: Olliver
- Swiss German: Ölu
- Tongan: Oliva
- Ukrainian: Олівер
- Welsh: Olifer

== People ==
=== A ===
- Oliver Abildgaard (born 1996), Danish footballer
- Oliver Acii (born 1970), Ugandan sprinter
- Oliver Ackermann (born 1976), American musician
- Oliver Ackland (born 1979), Australian actor
- Oliver Acquah (born 1946), Ghanaian footballer
- Oliver Adler (born 1967), German footballer
- Oliver Agapito (born 1973), Filipino basketball player
- Oliver Batali Albino (1935–2020), South Sudanese politician
- Oliver Alke (born 1970), German table tennis player
- Oliver Allen (disambiguation)
- Oliver Allison (1908–1989), English missionary
- Oliver Almadro, Filipino volleyball coach
- Oliver Almond, English priest
- Oliver Ames (disambiguation)
- Oliver Anderson (born 1998), Australian tennis player and coach
- Oliver Anketell, Irish politician
- Oliver Anthony (born 1992), American musician
- Oliver Antman (born 2001), Finnish footballer
- Oliver Cromwell Applegate (1845–1938), American politician
- Oliver Aquino (born 1989), Filipino actor
- Oliver Vernon Aplin (1858–1940), British ornithologist
- Oliver Arblaster (born 2004), English footballer
- Oliver Arms (born 1970), American painter
- Oliver Rendell Arton (1916–2011), Bermudian banker
- Oliver Askew (born 1996), Swedish-American race car driver
- Oliver F. Atkins (1917–1977), American photographer
- Oliver August, English corporate executive
- Oliver Augustini (born 1990), Slovak footballer
- Oliver L. Austin (1903–1988), American ornithologist
- Oliver R. Avison (1860–1959), Canadian doctor
- Oliver Axnick (born 1970), German curler

=== B ===
- Oliver Babic (born 1994), Danish badminton player
- Oliver Backhouse (1875–1943), English naval officer
- Oliver Badman (1885–1977), Australian politician
- Oliver Bailey (born 1982), English cricketer
- Oliver Baker (1856–1939), English painter
- Oliver Keith Baker (born 1959), American physicist
- Oliver Balch, British author
- Oliver Baldwin (1899–1958), British politician
- Oliver Barbosa (born 1986), Filipino chess grandmaster
- Oliver Barclay (1919–2013), British academic
- Oliver Barnett (born 1966), American football player
- Oliver Barrett (disambiguation)
- Oliver Barth (born 1979), German footballer
- Oliver Batchelor (born 1996), English cricketer
- Oliver Bäte (born 1965), German corporate executive
- Oliver Bateman (1923–2012), American politician
- Oliver Battcock (1903–1970), English cricketer
- Oliver Bauchau, American aerospace engineer
- Oliver Baumann (born 1990), German footballer
- Oliver Roberto Bazzani (1941-2016), Brazilian footballer
- Oliver Bearman (born 2005), British racing driver
- Oliver Beer (disambiguation)
- Oliver Bekker (born 1984), South African golfer
- Oliver Bell (born 2004), American actor
- Oliver Belmont (1858–1908), American socialite
- Oliver Baez Bendorf (born 1987), American poet
- Oliver Bendt (born 1946), German singer
- Oliver Bengough (born 1975), British entrepreneur
- Oliver Benítez (born 1991), Argentinian footballer
- Oliver Bennett (born 1992), British racing driver
- Oliver Bennett (cricketer) (1889–1977), Trinidadian cricketer
- Oliver Berg (born 1993), Norwegian footballer
- Oliver Bernard (1925–2013), English poet
- Oliver Percy Bernard (1881–1939), English architect
- Oliver Berntzon (born 1993), Swedish racing driver
- Oliver F. Berry (1908–1991), American military officer
- Oliver Bertram (1910–1975), English racing driver
- Oliver Bevan (born 1941), English artist
- Oliver Bias (born 2001), German footballer
- Oliver Bierhoff (born 1968), German footballer
- Oliver Mowat Biggar (1876–1948), Canadian lawyer
- Oliver Biles (born 1990), British actor
- Oliver Bimber (born 1973), German computer scientist
- Oliver Bjerrehuus (born 1975), Danish model
- Oliver Bjerrum Jensen (born 2002), Danish footballer
- Oliver Bjorkstrand (born 1995), Danish ice hockey player
- Oliver Blake (1802–1873), Canadian businessman
- Oliver Blanco (born 1991), Venezuelan politician
- Oliver Blume (born 1968), German corporate executive
- Oliver Boberg (born 1965), German artist
- Oliver Bocking (born 1996), English cricketer
- Óliver Bocos (born 1982), Spanish footballer
- Oliver Bodington (1859–1936), English barrister
- Oliver Bogatinov (born 1978), Slovenian football manager
- Oliver Bohm (born 1992), Swedish ice hockey player
- Oliver Bond (1760–1798), Irish merchant
- Oliver James Bond (1865–1933), American educator
- Oliver Bone (born 1981), Canadian sailor
- Oliver Bonk (born 2005), Canadian ice hockey player
- Oliver Boot (born 1979), English actor
- Oliver Bosbyshell (1839–1921), American military officer and superintendent of the United States Mint in Philadelphia
- Oliver Bowen (1942–2000), Canadian engineer
- Oliver Bowles (??–1646), English minister
- Oliver Bozanic (born 1989), Australian footballer
- Oliver Braddick (1944–2022), British psychologist
- Oliver Bradwell (born 1992), American sprinter
- Oliver Ernesto Branch (1847–1916), American politician
- Oliver Winslow Branch (1879–1956), American judge
- Oliver Braude (born 2004), Norwegian footballer
- Oliver Brennand (born 1986), English rugby union footballer
- Oliver Sylvain Baliol Brett (1881–1963), British politician
- Oliver Bright Jr., Liberian politician
- Oliver Bromby (born 1998), English sprinter
- Oliver Bronson (1799–1875), American physician
- Oliver Brooks (1889–1940), English soldier
- Oliver Broome (born 1937), Barbadian cricketer
- Oliver Broumis (born 1964), German actor
- Oliver Brown (disambiguation)
- Oliver Browne, English furniture maker
- Oliver Brownson (1746–1815), American composer
- Oliver Bryant (born 1995), English rugby union footballer
- Oliver Bryson (1896–1977), English air force officer
- Oliver Bub (born 1998), American rower
- Oliver Buchmueller, English scientist
- Oliver Ellsworth Buckley (1887–1959), American electrical engineer
- Oliver Prince Buel (1838–1899), American lawyer
- Oliver Buff (born 1992), Swiss footballer
- Oliver Bulleid (1882–1970), British engineer
- Oliver Bullough (born 1977), British writer
- Oliver Bulman (1902–1974), British paleontologist
- Oliver Bell Bunce (1828–1890), American author
- Oliver Bundgaard (born 2001), Danish footballer
- Oliver D. Burden (1873–1947), American lawyer
- Oliver Burgess (born 1981), English footballer
- Oliver Burke (disambiguation)
- Oliver Burkeman (born 1976), British journalist
- Oliver Burton (1879–1929), English footballer
- Oliver Robert Hawke Bury (1861–1946), English engineer
- Oliver Butterworth (disambiguation)
- Oliver Byerly (1840–1929), American politician
- Oliver Byrne (disambiguation)
- Oliver Doud Byron (1842–1920), American actor

=== C ===
- Oliver Callan (born 1980), Irish vocalist
- Oliver Camenzind (born 1972), Swiss footballer
- Oliver Campbell (1871–1953), American tennis player
- Oliver Carlson (1899–1991), American activist
- Oliver Carmichael (1891–1966), American academic administrator
- Oliver Carminow (??–1597), English politician
- Oliver Carter (disambiguation)
- Oliver Caruso (born 1974), German weightlifter
- Oliver Cary (1752–1846), Irish priest
- Oliver Casey (born 2000), English footballer
- Oliver A. Caswell (1826–1885), American politician
- Oliver Celestin (born 1981), American football player
- Oliver Chace (1769–1852), American businessman
- Oliver Newberry Chaffee (1881–1944), American painter
- Oliver P. Chandler (1807–1895), American politician
- Oliver Chapoy, American musician
- Oliver Cheatham (1948–2013), American singer
- Oliver Cheshire (born 1988), English fashion model
- Oliver Chesler (born 1970), American music artist
- Oliver Chesterton (1913–2007), British businessman
- Oliver Chinganya, Zambian statistician
- Oliver Chirhart (1875–1962), American businessman and politician
- Oliver Chris (born 1978), English actor
- Oliver Christensen (born 1999), Danish footballer
- Oliver Christianson, American cartoonist
- Oliver Churchill (1914–1997), British military officer
- Oliver Clark (born 1939), American actor
- Oliver Clark (rugby league) (born 1996), Australian rugby league footballer
- Oliver L. Clark (1836–1908), American politician
- Oliver B. Clason (1850–??), American politician
- Oliver Clayson (born 1980), English cricketer
- Oliver Clifton (1847–1905), American politician
- Oliver Edmund Clubb (1901–1989), American diplomat
- Oliver Clue (born 1952), Jamaican politician
- Oliver Coates (born 1982), English musician
- Oliver Coleman (born 1983), British actor
- Oliver J. Coleman (1844–1926), American politician
- Oliver Colina (born 1982), Filipino footballer
- Oliver Colloty (born 2003), New Zealand footballer
- Oliver Colvile (born 1959), British politician
- Oliver Colwell (1834–1872), American soldier
- Oliver C. Comstock (1780–1860), American politician
- Oliver Cook (born 1990), British rower
- Oliver Cookson, British entrepreneur
- Oliver Cooper (disambiguation)
- Oliver Cope (1902–1994), American surgeon
- Oliver Copestake (1921–1953), English footballer
- Oliver Coppard (born 1981), British politician
- Oliver P. Coshow (1863–1937), American politician
- Oliver Cotton (born 1944), English actor
- Oliver Cowdery (1806–1850), American religious leader
- Oliver Cox (1901–1974), Trinidadian-American sociologist
- Oliver Crane (born 1998), American rower
- Oliver Crane (clergy) (1822–1896), American clergyman
- Oliver Crawford (1917–2008), American screenwriter
- Oliver Crewe (1947–2020), Irish Gaelic footballer
- Oliver D. Crisp (born 1972), English theologian
- Oliver Cromwell (disambiguation)
- Oliver S. Crosby (1920–2014), American diplomat
- Oliver Crosthwaite-Eyre (1913–1978), British politician
- Oliver H. Cross (1868–1960), American politician
- Oliver Cuadrado (born 1977), Spanish footballer
- Oliver Currill (born 1997), English cricketer
- Oliver Cutts (1873–1939), American football player

=== D ===
- Oliver Daedlow (born 2000), German footballer
- Oliver Daemen (born 2002), Dutch space tourist
- Oliver Dahler (born 1969), German water polo player
- Oliver Dahl-Goli (1897–1976), Norwegian politician
- Oliver Ellsworth Daggett (1810–1880), American minister
- Oliver Dalrymple (1830–1908), American farmer
- Oliver Daniel (1911–1990), American composer
- Oliver Daniels (born 1964), Liberian sprinter
- Oliver Darcy (born 1990), American journalist
- Oliver Darley, American singer
- Oliver Davidson (born 2004), Scottish cricketer
- Oliver Davies (disambiguation)
- Oliver Davis (disambiguation)
- Oliver Dawnay (1920–1988), British civil servant
- Oliver C. Dawson (1910–1989), American athlete
- Oliver Dean (1783–1871), American physician
- Oliver De Coque (1947–2008), Nigerian guitarist
- Oliver de Critz (1626–1651), English painter
- Oliver De Lancey (disambiguation)
- Oliver de la Paz, Filipino-American poet
- Oliver DeMille (born 1968), American author
- Oliver Dempsey (born 2003), Australian rules footballer
- Oliver Denham (born 2002), Welsh footballer
- Oliver de Vaux (??–1244), English nobleman
- Oliver E. Diaz Jr., American judge
- Oliver Morton Dickerson (1875–1966), American historian
- Oliver James Dickey (1823–1876), American politician
- Oliver Booth Dickinson (1857–1939), American judge
- Oliver W. Dillard (1926–2015), American general
- Oliver Dillon (born 1998), English actor
- Oliver Dimitrioski (born 1972), Macedonian handball coach
- Oliver Dimsdale (born 1972), English actor
- Oliver Dingley (born 1992), Irish diver
- Oliver Ditson (1811–1888), American businessman
- Oliver Dlouhý (born 1988), Czech entrepreneur
- Oliver H. Dockery (1830–1906), American politician
- Oliver Đokić (born 1981), Serbian footballer
- Oliver Dolan (1894–1985), English rugby league footballer
- Oliver D. Doleski (born 1967), German economist
- Oliver Domke (born 1976), German field hockey player
- Oliver Double (born 1965), British comedian
- Oliver Dovin (born 2002), Swedish footballer
- Oliver Dowden (born 1978), British politician
- Oliver Drachta (born 1977), Austrian football referee
- Oliver Dragicevic (born 2007), Australian footballer
- Oliver Dragojević (1947–2018), Croatian singer
- Oliver Drake (disambiguation)
- Oliver Drechsel (born 1973), German pianist
- Oliver Driver (born 1974), New Zealand actor
- Oliver Drost (born 1995), Danish footballer
- Oliver Duff (disambiguation)
- Oliver Dulić (born 1975), Serbian politician
- Oliver Dunn (born 1997), American baseball player
- Oliver Dunne (born 1977), Irish chef
- Oliver Dupont (born 1990), Danish curler
- Oliver Dustin (born 2000), British runner
- Oliver Dvojakovski (born 1997), Macedonian basketball player
- Oliver Dyer (1824–1907), American journalist
- Oliver Dynham (??–1500), English priest
- Oliver Dziubak (born 1982), German-born Australian javelin thrower

=== E ===
- Oliver P. Echols (1892–1954), American military officer
- Oliver Tarbell Eddy (1799–1868), American painter
- Oliver Eden (born 1953), British politician
- Oliver Valaker Edvardsen (born 1999), Norwegian footballer
- Oliver Edwards (1835–1904), American army officer
- Oliver Edwards (United States Army officer) (1871–1921), American army officer
- Oliver Effersøe (1863–1933), Faroese politician
- Oliver Eggimann (1919–2002), Swiss footballer
- Oliver Ekman-Larsson (born 1991), Swedish ice hockey player
- Oliver Ekroth (born 1992), Swedish footballer
- Oliver Elliot (born 1987), Chilean swimmer
- Oliver Ellsworth (1745–1807), American lawyer and politician
- Oliver Elmes (1934–2011), British graphic designer
- Oliver Elton (1861–1945), English literary scholar
- Oliver Emanuel (1980–2023), British playwright
- Oliver Emert (1902–1975), American set decorator
- Oliver Farrar Emerson (1860–1927), American educator
- Oliver Enkamp (born 1991), Swedish mixed martial artist
- Oliver Enwonwu, Nigerian artist
- Oliver Eronen (1865–1939), Finnish politician
- Oliver Evans (1755–1819), American inventor
- Oliver Everett, British diplomat

=== F ===
- Oliver Farnworth (born 1982), English actor
- Oliver Farr (born 1988), Welsh golfer
- Oliver Farrer (1904–1954), English politician
- Oliver C. Farrington (1864–1933), American geologist
- Oliver Fartach-Naini (born 1964), German guitarist
- Oliver Atkins Farwell (1867–1944), American botanist
- Oliver Lanard Fassig (1860–1936), American meteorologist
- Oliver Feldballe (born 1990), Dutch footballer
- Oliver Feltham, Australian philosopher
- Oliver Ferenc (born 1969), Serbian darts player
- Oliver Fernández (disambiguation)
- Oliver Fiechter (born 1972), Swiss philosopher
- Oliver Fiennes (1926–2011), English priest
- Oliver Filip (born 1998), Austrian footballer
- Oliver Filley (1806–1881), American businessman
- Oliver Fink (born 1982), German footballer
- Oliver Finney (born 1997), English footballer
- Oliver Fisher (born 1988), English golfer
- Oliver FitzEustace (died 1491), Irish judge
- Oliver FitzWilliam, 1st Earl of Tyrconnell (died 1667), Irish nobleman
- Oliver Fix (born 1973), German canoeist
- Oliver J. Flanagan (1920–1987), Irish politician
- Oliver Fletcher (1923–1994), American football player
- Oliver Florent (born 1998), Australian rules footballer
- Oliver Fobassam (born 2003), German footballer
- Oliver W. Fontaine (1900–??), American architect
- Oliver Foot (1946–2008), British actor
- Oliver Ford (sprinter) (born 1947), American sprinter
- Oliver Frederick Ford (1925–1992), English interior designer
- Oliver Forster (1925–1999), British diplomat
- Oliver Fortuin, South African businessman
- Oliver Forward (1781–1834), American politician
- Oliver Fox (disambiguation)
- Oliver Frank (1963–2022), German singer
- Oliver Franks (1905–1992), English civil servant
- Oliver Frazer (1808–1864), American painter
- Oliver Freelove (born 1977), British tennis player
- Oliver Óge French (??–1666), Irish merchant
- Oliver Frey (1948–2022), Swiss-British artist
- Oliver W. Frey (1887–1939), American politician
- Oliver Fricker (born 1978/1979), Swiss criminal
- Oliver Friedmann, German computer scientist
- Oliver Friggieri (1947–2020), Maltese poet
- Oliver Parker Fritchle (1874–1951), American chemist
- Oliver H. Fritz (1905–1985), American politician
- Oliver Froning (born 1963), German musician
- Oliver Fuchs (born 1971), Austrian tennis player
- Oliver Clyde Fuller (1860–1942), American banker
- Oliver Furley (1927–2015), English historian

=== G ===
- Oliver Gagliani (1917–2002), American photographer
- Oliver M. Gale (1910–2006), American pioneer
- Oliver Gannon (born 1943), Irish-Canadian guitarist
- Oliver Max Gardner (1882–1947), American politician
- Oliver Garrett (1895–1979), American police officer
- Oliver H. P. Garrett (1894–1952), American film director
- Oliver Gasch (1906–1999), American judge
- Oliver Gatty (1907–1940), British chemist
- Oliver Gavin (born 1972), British racing driver
- Oliver Geis (born 1991), German sports shooter
- Oliver Geissen (born 1969), German television presenter
- Oliver Geissmann (born 1978), Liechtensteiner sports shooter
- Oliver Genausch (born 1991), German footballer
- Oliver Gerbig (born 1998), Hong Kong footballer
- Oliver Wolcott Gibbs (1822–1908), American chemist
- Oliver Gibson (politician) (1934–2018), Northern Irish politician
- Oliver Gibson (American football) (1972–2025), American football player
- Oliver Gilbert (born 1972), American politician
- Oliver Gilbert (lichenologist) (1936–2005), English lichenologist
- Oliver Gildart (born 1996), English rugby league footballer
- Oliver Gill (born 1990), English footballer
- Oliver Gillie (1937–2021), British journalist
- Oliver Gilmour (born 1953), British conductor
- Oliver Holmes Gish (1883–1987), American geophysicist
- Oliver Glasgow (born 1972), English barrister
- Oliver Glasner (born 1974), Austrian football coach
- Oliver Gledhill (born 1966), English cellist
- Oliver Edmunds Glenn (1878–??), American mathematician
- Oliver S. Glisson (1809–1890), American naval officer
- Oliver Goethe (born 2004), Danish-German racing driver
- Oliver St. John Gogarty (1878–1957), Irish poet
- Oliver Golding (born 1993), British tennis player and actor
- Oliver Goldsmith (1730–1774), Irish novelist
- Oliver Goldstick (born 1961), American screenwriter
- Oliver Goodall (1922–2010), American military aviator
- Oliver Paul Gooding (1835–1909), American army officer
- Oliver Goodwill (born 1982), British actor
- Oliver Ernest Goonetilleke (1892–1978), Sri Lankan politician
- Oliver Gordon (disambiguation)
- Oliver Goss (born 1994), Australian golfer
- Oliver Gottwald (born 1978), German singer
- Oliver Gough (1935–2020), Irish hurler
- Oliver Robert Gould (1874–1951), Canadian farmer
- Oliver Grace, Irish politician
- Oliver Dowell John Grace (1791–1871), Irish politician
- Oliver Graham (born 1995), English cricketer
- Oliver Granger (1794–1841), an early leader in the Church of Jesus Christ of Latter Day Saints
- Oliver Grant (disambiguation)
- Oliver Grau (born 1965), German art historian
- Oliver Green (born 1951), English author
- Oliver B. Greene (1915–1976), American religious figure
- Oliver Duff Greene (1833–1904), American army officer
- Oliver Green-Wilkinson (1913–1970), English bishop
- Oliver Gregory (1917–2001), Australian politician
- Oliver Griffin (born 1983), British visual artist
- Oliver Grimm (born 1969), Swiss gymnast
- Oliver Gross (born 1973), German tennis player
- Oliver Dennett Grover (1861–1927), American painter
- Oliver Grün (born 1969), German engineer
- Oliver Grundmann (born 1971), German politician
- Oliver Grüner (born 1966), German rower
- Oliver Günes (born 2002), Finnish footballer
- Oliver Gunning (born 1996), Irish cricketer
- Oliver Günther (born 1961), German academic administrator
- Oliver Gurney (1911–2001), English historian
- Oliver Gussenberg (born 1976), German judoka
- Oliver Gustafsson (born 1993), Swedish footballer
- Oliver Gutfleisch, German volleyball player
- Oliver Guy-Watkins (born 1979), British film director
- Oliver Gwilt (born 1993), Welsh badminton player

=== H ===
- Oliver Haarmann (born 1967), German financier
- Oliver Haden, British actor
- Oliver Haig (born 2002), New Zealand rugby union footballer
- Oliver Hailey (1932–1993), American screenwriter
- Oliver Hald (born 1999), Danish cricketer
- Oliver Hall (disambiguation)
- Oliver Spencer Halstead (1792–1877), American politician
- Oliver Deveta Hamlin Jr. (1892–1973), American judge
- Oliver Hammond (born 2002), Welsh footballer
- Oliver Hampel (born 1985), German footballer
- Oliver Hannon-Dalby (born 1989), English cricketer
- Oliver Hanrahan (born 1998), Australian rules footballer
- Oliver Hardy (1892–1957), American comic actor
- Oliver Harms (1901–1980), American religious figure, president of the Lutheran Church–Missouri Synod
- Oliver Harriman (1829–1904), American businessman
- Oliver Harriman Jr. (1862–1940), American stockbroker
- Oliver Harris (academic), British academic
- Oliver Harris (trade unionist) (1873–1944), Welsh trade unionist
- Oliver Harrison, English filmmaker
- Oliver Hart (disambiguation)
- Oliver C. Hartley (1823–1859), American lawyer
- Oliver Hartmann (born 1970), German musician
- Oliver Marc Hartwich (born 1975), German economist
- Oliver Harvey (disambiguation)
- Oliver Hassencamp (1921–1988), German writer
- Oliver Hawkins (born 1992), English footballer
- Oliver Perry Hay (1846–1930), American paleontologist
- Oliver Hayes-Brown (born 2000), Australian basketball player
- Oliver Haywood (1911–2002), American army officer
- Oliver Haze, Canadian singer-songwriter
- Oliver Heald (born 1954), British politician
- Oliver Heaviside (1850–1925), English electrical engineer
- Oliver Hegi (born 1993), Swiss gymnast
- Oliver Heil (born 1988), German footballer
- Oliver Helander (born 1997), Finnish javelin thrower
- Oliver Held (born 1972), German footballer
- Oliver Heldens (born 1995), Dutch disc jockey
- Oliver T Hellriegel (born 1965), German-American author
- Oliver Hemsley (born 1962), English businessman
- Olivier Hendriks (born 2003), Dutch Paralympic athlete
- Oliver Henry (disambiguation)
- Oliver Herber (born 1981), German footballer
- Oliver Herbrich (born 1961), German filmmaker
- Oliver Herford (1860–1935), English-American writer
- Oliver Hermanus (born 1983), South African film director
- Oliver Herring (born 1964), German artist
- Oliver Heyward (1926–2003), Australian bishop
- Oliver Heywood (1825–1892), English banker and philanthropist
- Oliver Heywood (minister) (1630–1702), British minister
- Oliver Hill (disambiguation)
- Oliver Hilmes (born 1971), German author
- Oliver Hirschbiegel (born 1957), German film director
- Oliver Hoare (1945–2018), English art dealer
- Oliver Hobgood (born 2004), West Indian footballer
- Oliver Hogue (1880–1919), Australian soldier
- Oliver Holden (1765–1844), American composer
- Oliver Hollands (born 2004), Australian rules footballer
- Oliver Holmes (rugby league) (born 1992), English rugby league footballer
- Oliver Wendell Holmes Jr. (1841–1935), American jurist
- Oliver Wendell Holmes Sr. (1809–1894), American physician and poet
- Oliver Holt (born 1966), English sports journalist
- Oliver J. Holtan (1891–1971), American businessman and politician
- Oliver Holzbecher (born 1970), German footballer
- Oliver Höner (born 1966), Swiss figure skater
- Oliver Horn (1901–1960), American water polo player
- Oliver Horsbrugh (1937–2009), British television director
- Oliver Otis Howard (1830–1909), American army officer
- Oliver Aiken Howland (1847–1905), Canadian politician
- Oliver Hoyt (1823–1887), American politician
- Oliver Hoyte (born 1984), American football player
- Oliver Hudson (born 1976), American actor
- Oliver Madox Hueffer (1877–1931), English author
- Oliver Hughes (1844–1911), American soldier
- Oliver Huie (1878–1951), American football player
- Oliver Humperdink (1949–2011), American professional wrestler
- Oliver Hundebøll (born 1999), Danish golfer
- Oliver M. Hungerford (1827–1888), American politician
- Oliver Huntemann (born 1968), German disc jockey
- Oliver Hunter (born 1934), Guyanese sprinter
- Oliver Hüsing (born 1993), German footballer
- Oliver Hutton (born 1979), South African cricketer
- Oliver Huyshe (1885–1960), English cricketer
- Oliver Moulton Hyde (1804–1870), American businessman
- Oliver Hynd (born 1994), British swimmer

=== I ===
- Oliver Ibielski (1971–2017), German rower
- Oliver Igel (born 1978), German politician
- Oliver Ingham (1287–1344), English knight
- Oliver Ingrosso (born 1989), Swedish disc jockey
- Oliver Irving, British film director
- Oliver Ivanović (1953–2018), Serbian politician

=== J ===
- Oliver Jackson (disambiguation)
- Oliver Jackson-Cohen (born 1986), English actor and model
- Oliver James (disambiguation)
- Oliver Jandrić (born 1972), Bosnian footballer
- Oliver Janich (born 1969), German conspiracy theorist
- Oliver Janso (born 1993), Slovak footballer
- Oliver Erichson Janson (1850–1925), English entomologist
- Oliver Jarvis (born 1984), English racing driver
- Oliver Jeffers (born 1977), Northern Irish artist
- Oliver Peebles Jenkins (1850–1935), American psychologist
- Oliver Jennings (disambiguation)
- Oliver Jessel (1929–2017), New Zealand-British businessman
- Oliver John (born 1959), American psychologist
- Oliver Johnson (disambiguation)
- Oliver Johnston (actor) (1888–1966), English actor
- Oliver Jokeľ (born 1991), Slovak ice hockey player
- Oliver Jones (disambiguation)
- Oliver Joseph, Grenadian politician
- Oliver Jovanovic (born 1966), American microbiologist
- Oliver Jürgens (born 2003), Estonian footballer

=== K ===
- Oliver Kaczmarek (born 1970), German politician
- Oliver Kahn (born 1969), German footballer
- Oliver Kalkofe (born 1965), German columnist
- Oliver Källbom (born 1995), Swedish ice hockey player
- Oliver Kamm (born 1963), British writer and journalist
- Oliver Kangaslahti (born 2000), Finnish footballer
- Oliver Kapanen (born 2003), Finnish ice hockey player
- Oliver Kass Kawo (born 2001), Syrian footballer
- Oliver Kaul, German professor
- Oliver Kayser (born 1973), Austrian fencer
- Oliver Kegel (born 1961), German canoeist
- Oliver Kelley (disambiguation)
- Oliver Dimon Kellogg (1878–1932), American mathematician
- Oliver Kelly (1777–1834), Irish clergyman
- Oliver Kentish (born 1954), British cellist
- Oliver D. Kessel (1901–1992), justice of the Supreme Court of Appeals of West Virginia
- Oliver Kessing (1890–1963), American naval officer
- Oliver Kieffer (born 1979), French volleyball player
- Oliver Kilbourn (1904–1993), British painter
- Oliver Killeen (born 1937), Irish fraudster
- Oliver Kimberley, English priest
- Oliver King (disambiguation)
- Oliver Kirch (born 1982), German footballer
- Oliver Kirk (1884–1960), American boxer
- Oliver Kite (1920–1968), English naturalist
- Oliver Kitson (1915–1996), British politician
- Oliver Kizito (born 1988), Kenyan rugby union footballer
- Oliver Klaus (born 1990), Swiss footballer
- Oliver Klemet (born 2002), German swimmer
- Oliver Klitten (born 2000), Danish footballer
- Oliver Knight (born 1969), British singer-songwriter
- Oliver Knight (cyclist) (born 2001), British cyclist
- Oliver Knussen (1952–2018), English composer
- Oliver Koenig (born 1981), German sprinter
- Oliver Kohlenberg (born 1957), German composer
- Oliver Köhrmann (born 1976), German handball player
- Oliver Koletzki (born 1974), German disc jockey
- Oliver Konsa (born 1985), Estonian footballer
- Oliver Koppell (born 1940), American politician and lawyer
- Oliver Korittke (born 1968), German actor
- Oliver Korn (born 1984), German field hockey player
- Oliver Korte (born 1969), German composer
- Oliver Kostić (born 1973), Serbian basketball coach
- Oliver Kosturanov (1968–2014), Macedonian businessman
- Oliver Kovačević (born 1974), Serbian footballer
- Oliver Katwesigye Koyekyenga (born 1974), Ugandan businesswoman
- Oliver Knussen (1952–2018), British composer and conductor
- Oliver Kraas (born 1975), South African skier
- Oliver Kragl (born 1990), German footballer
- Oliver Kraus (born 1970), English musician
- Oliver Kreuzer (born 1965), German footballer
- Oliver Krischer (born 1969), German politician
- Oliver Krüger (born 1973), German professor
- Oliver Kruuda (born 1967), Estonian entrepreneur
- Oliver Kuhn (1898–1968), American athlete and businessman
- Oliver Kumbartzky (born 1981), German politician
- Oliver Kurtz (born 1971), German field hockey player
- Oliver Kuusik (born 1980), Estonian musician
- Oliver Kylington (born 1997), Swedish ice hockey player

=== L ===
- Oliver La Farge (1901–1963), American anthropologist
- Oliver Lafayette (born 1984), American basketball player
- Oliver LaGrone (1906–1995), American sculptor
- Oliver Lake (born 1942), American musician
- Oliver Lambart (??–1618), Irish military commander
- Oliver Lamoreux (1924–1891), American politician
- Oliver Lampe (born 1974), German swimmer
- Oliver Lam-Watson (born 1992), British fencer
- Oliver Lang, American paintball player
- Oliver Langdon, Canadian politician
- Oliver Lange (1927–2013), American author
- Oliver H. Langeland (1887–1958), Norwegian military officer
- Oliver Langford, English football referee
- Oliver Langton (1905–1978), English motorcyclist
- Oliver Lansley (born 1981), British actor
- Oliver Waterman Larkin (1896–1970), American art historian
- Oliver Larraz (born 2001), American soccer player
- Oliver Larsen (born 1998), Danish ice hockey player
- Oliver Lauridsen (born 1989), Danish ice hockey player
- Oliver Laux (born 1990), German footballer
- Oliver Lavigilante, Mauritanian boxer
- Oliver Law (1900–1937), American labor organizer
- Oliver Lawrence (1507–1559), English politician
- Oliver Laxe (born 1982), French-Spanish film director
- Oliver Laxton (born 1999), Hong Kong footballer
- Oliver Ingraham Lay (1845–1890), American painter
- Oliver Layne (1876–1932), West Indian cricketer
- Oliver Leaman (born 1950), American professor
- Oliver LeBoutillier (1894–1983), American aviator
- Oliver Lederer (born 1978), Austrian football manager
- Oliver Lee (disambiguation)
- Oliver Leese (1894–1978), British army officer
- Oliver Leggett (1876–1946), English naval officer
- Oliver Legipont (1698–1758), German bibliographer
- Oliver Leith (born 1990), British composer
- Oliver Le Neve (1662–1711), English land owner
- Oliver Lepsius (born 1964), German professor
- Oliver Letwin (born 1956), British politician
- Oliver Levick (1899–1965), English footballer
- Oliver Lewis (1856–1924), American jockey
- Oliver Lewis (violinist) (born 1971), British violinist
- Oliver Leydon-Davis (born 1990), New Zealand badminton player
- Oliver Leyland (born 2001), English rugby league footballer
- Oliver Lieb (born 1969), German disc jockey
- Oliver Lines (born 1995), English snooker player
- Oliver Linton, English professor
- Oliver Lis (born 1984), Colombian editor
- Oliver Lloyd (1570/1571–1625), Welsh priest
- Oliver Lloyd (MP) (1527–1589), Welsh politician
- Oliver Locker-Lampson (1880–1954), British politician
- Oliver Lodge (1851–1940), British physicist and writer
- Oliver W. F. Lodge (1878–1955), English poet and author
- Oliver Loftéen (1979–2021), Swedish actor
- Oliver Loode (born 1974), Estonian activist
- Oliver Leland Loring (1904–1979), American bishop
- Oliver Loving (1812–1867), American rancher
- Oliver H. Lowry (1910–1996), American biochemist
- Oliver Lozano (1940–2018), Filipino lawyer
- Oliver Luck (born 1960), American football player
- Oliver Luckett (born 1974), American entrepreneur
- Oliver Luke (1574–1651), English politician
- Oliver Lukić (born 2006), Croatian footballer
- Oliver Luksic (born 1979), German politician
- Oliver Lund (born 1990), Danish footballer
- Oliver Lincoln Lundquist (1916–2008), American architect
- Oliver Luterán (born 2001), Slovak footballer
- Oliver Lyle (1891–1961), British inventor
- Oliver Lyne (1944–2005), British academic
- Oliver Lynn (1926–1996), American talent manager
- Oliver Lyttelton (1893–1972), British businessman and politician

=== M ===
- Oliver Ogedengbe Macaulay (1918–1972), Nigerian politician
- Oliver MacDonagh (1924–2002), Irish professor
- Oliver Macdonald (1904–1973), American athlete
- Oliver MacGreevy (1928–1981), Irish actor
- Oliver Mack (born 1957), American basketball player
- Oliver Maillard (1430–1502), Breton preacher
- Oliver Makor (born 1973), Liberian footballer
- Oliver Maltman (born 1976), English actor
- Oliver Mandić (born 1953), Serbian musician
- Oliver Mann, Australian singer-songwriter
- Oliver D. Mann (1877–1956), American football player
- Oliver Manners (1581–1613), English politician
- Oliver Månsson (born 2009), Swedish footballer
- Oliver Marach (born 1980), Austrian tennis player
- Oliver Marcell (1895–1949), American baseball player
- Oliver Marcy (1820–1899), American academic administrator
- Oliver Maric (born 1981), Croatian-Swiss footballer
- Oliver Mark (born 1963), German photographer
- Oliver Markoutz (born 1995), Austrian footballer
- Oliver Marks (1866–1940), English cricketer
- Oliver Marmol (born 1986), American baseball manager
- Oliver Maron (born 1983), Slovak ice hockey player
- Oliver T. Marsh (1892–1941), American cinematographer
- Oliver S. Marshall (1850–1934), American politician
- Oliver Marti (born 1970), Canadian-American investor
- Oliver Martin (disambiguation)
- Oliver Albert Farres Martins (born 1943), Mexican diplomat
- Oliver Martini (born 1971), Italian racing driver
- Oliver Martinov (born 1975), Croatian rower
- Oliver Mathews (1520–1618), Welsh chronicler
- Oliver Matuschek, German author
- Oliver Mason (born 1979), British actor
- Oliver Massmann (born 1966), German lawyer
- Oliver Masucci (born 1968), German actor
- Oliver Mayer, American playwright
- Oliver Mbekeka (born 1979), Ugandan football manager
- Oliver McCall (born 1965), American boxer
- Oliver McGee (1957–2020), American political analyst
- Oliver McGowan (1907-1971), American actor
- Oliver McGrath (born 1938), Irish sportsman
- Oliver McGregor (1921–1997), British sociologist
- Oliver McMullan (born 1952), Irish politician
- Oliver McQuaid (born 1954), Irish cyclist
- Oliver Mears, English opera director
- Oliver Batista Meier (born 2001), German footballer
- Oliver Mellor (born 1981), British actor
- Oliver Messel (1904–1978), English artist
- Oliver Milburn (born 1973), English actor
- Oliver Milburn (1883-1932), Canadian painter
- Oliver Miles (1936–2019), British diplomat
- Oliver Miller (1970–2025), American basketball player
- Oliver Minatel (born 1992), Brazilian footballer
- Oliver Mintzlaff (born 1975), German football referee
- Oliver Mlakar (born 1935), Croatian television presenter
- Oliver Mobisson (1943–2010), Nigerian entrepreneur
- Oliver Mohr (born 1992), Austrian footballer
- Oliver Monksfield, English footballer
- Oliver Montagu (1655–1689), English politician
- Oliver Moore (disambiguation)
- Oliver Moors (born 1996), British cyclist
- Oliver Morgan (1933–2007), American singer
- Oliver Morgan (swimmer) (born 2003), English swimmer
- Oliver Morosco (1875–1945), American theatrical producer
- Oliver Morris (1916–1944), Welsh rugby league footballer
- Oliver Morris (gymnast) (1886–1971), British gymnast
- Oliver A. Morse (1815–1870), American politician
- Oliver Morton (science writer), British science writer
- Oliver P. Morton (1823–1877), American politician
- Oliver Mowat (1820–1903), Canadian politician
- Oliver Moxon (1922–1989), British politician
- Oliver Møystad (1892–1956), Norwegian engineer
- Oliver Mtukudzi (1952–2019), Zimbabwean musician
- Oliver Mueller, German volleyball player
- Oliver Muirhead (born 1957), English actor
- Oliver Mundell (born 1989), Scottish politician
- Oliver B. Munroe (1856–1916), American politician

=== N ===
- Oliver Naesen (born 1990), Belgian cyclist
- Oliver Napier (1935–2011), Northern Irish politician
- Oliver F. Naquin (1904–1989), American naval officer
- Oliver Nash (1931–2013), American politician
- Oliver Neighbour (1923–2015), British librarian
- Oliver Nelson (1932–1975), American musician
- Oliver Neuville (born 1973), German footballer
- Oliver Newby (born 1984), English cricketer
- Oliver Newey (born 1986), Guernsey cricketer
- Oliver Newman (disambiguation)
- Oliver Newmarch (1834–1920), British Indian Army major-general
- Oliver N'Goma (1959–2010), Gabonese musician
- Oliver Nicolls (1740–1829), British army officer
- Oliver Nightingale (born 1995), Guernsey cricketer
- Oliver John Nilsen (1884–1977), Australian businessman and politician
- Oliver W. Nixon (1825–1905), American teacher
- Oliver Njego (born 1959), Serbian musician
- Oliver Noonan (1939–1969), American photographer
- Oliver Norburn (born 1992), English footballer
- Oliver Norman (1911–1983), English cricketer
- Oliver North (born 1943), American colonel and political commentator
- Oliver Danson North (1887–1968), British engineer
- Oliver Norwood (born 1991), English footballer
- Oliver Nugent (1860–1926), British army officer

=== O ===
- Oliver Oakes (born 1988), British racing driver
- Oliver H. Oates, American politician
- Oliver O'Brien (1839–1894), American naval officer
- Oliver Ocasek (1925–1999), American politician
- Oliver O'Donovan (born 1945), British priest
- Oliver Oetke (born 1968), German beach volleyball player
- Oliver O'Gara, Irish politician
- Oliver O'Grady (born 1945), Irish priest
- Oliver O'Halloran (born 2000), Australian aviator
- Oliver Ojakäär (born 2005), Estonian tennis player
- Oliver Olsen (born 2000), Danish footballer
- Oliver Ongtawco (1941–2020), Filipino bowler
- Oliver Onions (1873–1961), English writer
- Oliver Orav (born 1995), Estonian volleyball player
- Oliver Ormsby (1767–1832), American businessman
- Oliver Orok (born 1963), Nigerian weightlifter
- Oliver Ortega (born 1996), Dominican baseball player
- Oliver Ortíz (born 1993), Mexican footballer
- Oliver Ortmann (born 1967), German pool player
- Oliver Otto (born 1972), German footballer

=== P ===
- Oliver Paasch (born 1971), Belgian politician
- Oliver Padel (born 1948), English historian
- Oliver Pagé (born 1971), German footballer
- Oliver Palotai (born 1974), German musician
- Oliver Park (born 1986), British writer
- Oliver Parker (born 1960), English film director
- Oliver Parks (1899–1985), American aviator
- Oliver Partington (born 1998), English rugby league footballer
- Oliver Partridge (1712–1792), American military officer
- Oliver Patrick (born 2003), English footballer
- Oliver Hazard Payne (1839–1917), American businessman
- Oliver Payne Pearson (1915–2003), American zoologist
- Oliver Peck (born 1971), American tattoo artist
- Oliver Pendlebury (born 2002), English footballer
- Oliver Penrose (born 1929), British physicist
- Óliver Pérez (born 1981), Mexican baseball player
- Oliver Perry (disambiguation)
- Oliver Perry-Smith (1884–1969), American mountaineer
- Oliver Petersch (born 1989), German footballer
- Oliver Petersen (born 2001), Norwegian footballer
- Oliver Peterson (born 1976), American artist
- Oliver Petrak (born 1991), Croatian footballer
- Oliver Petrucciani (born 1969), Swiss motorcycle racer
- Oliver Petszokat (born 1978), German singer
- Oliver Pett (born 1988), English squash player
- Oliver Pettersson (born 2003), Finnish footballer
- Oliver Peyton (born 1961), Irish restaurateur
- Oliver Phelps (disambiguation)
- Oliver Phillips (ecologist), British ecologist
- Oliver Philpot (1913–1993), Canadian-English air force officer
- Oliver S. Picher (1905–1984), American lieutenant general
- Oliver Pigg, English clergyman
- Oliver Pikati (born 1973), Botswanan footballer
- Oliver Pike (disambiguation)
- Oliver Piper (1884–1933), Welsh rugby union footballer
- Oliver Pitcher (born 1983), Bermudian cricketer
- Oliver Platt (born 1960), American actor
- Oliver Plunkett (disambiguation)
- Oliver Pocher (born 1978), German comedian
- Oliver Podhorín (born 1992), Slovak footballer
- Oliver Pollock (1737–1823), American merchant
- Oliver Pongratz (born 1973), German badminton player
- Oliver Poole (disambiguation)
- Oliver Popović (born 1970), Serbian basketball coach
- Oliver Popplewell (born 1927), British judge
- Oliver Postgate (1925–2008), English writer
- Oliver Pötschke (born 1987), German footballer
- Oliver Pötzsch (born 1970), German author
- Oliver Pough, American football coach
- Oliver Powell (disambiguation)
- Oliver Pranjic (born 1994), Austrian footballer
- Oliver Práznovský (born 1991), Slovak footballer
- Oliver Pratt (born 2004), English rugby league player
- Oliver Prescott (1731–1804), English physician
- Oliver Sherman Prescott (1924–1903), American priest
- Oliver Press (1952–2017), American physician
- Oliver Preston (born 1962), British cartoonist
- Oliver H. Prince (1782–1837), American politician
- Oliver Proske (born 1971), German stage designer
- Oliver Provstgaard (born 2003), Danish footballer
- Oliver Puflett (born 1999), Australian footballer
- Oliver Purnell (born 1953), American basketball coach

=== Q ===
- Oliver Chase Quick (1885–1944), English theologian

=== R ===
- Oliver Rackham (1939–2015), English professor
- Oliver Henry Radkey (1909–2000), American historian
- Oliver Ranasinghe, Sri Lankan military officer
- Oliver Randolph (1877–1951), American lawyer and politician
- Oliver Rasmussen (born 2000), Danish racing driver
- Oliver Rathbone (born 1996), English footballer
- Oliver Rathkolb (born 1955), Austrian historian
- Oliver Rau (born 1968), German rower
- Oliver Raymond (1605–1679), English politician
- Oliver Ready (born 1976), British translator
- Oliver Reck (born 1965), German footballer
- Oliver Redgate (1898–1929), British pilot
- Oliver Redgate (cricketer) (1863–1913), English cricketer
- Oliver Reed (1938–1999), English actor
- Oliver Reitala (born 1994), Finnish football referee
- Oliver Ressler (born 1970), Austrian artist
- Oliver Reynolds (born 1957), British poet
- Oliver Reynolds (cricketer) (1921–2014), South African cricketer
- Oliver G. Richard (born 1952), American businessman
- Oliver Riedel (born 1971), German musician
- Oliver Rifai (born 1993), Dutch footballer
- Oliver Ringelhahn (born 1969), Austrian opera singer
- Oliver Risser (born 1980), Namibian footballer
- Oliver Rix (born 1985), English actor
- Oliver Roberts (born 1994), Irish rugby league footballer
- Oliver Roberts (footballer) (born 1996), English footballer
- Oliver Robins (born 1971), American writer and actor
- Oliver Robinson (born 1960), American basketball player
- Oliver Roggisch (born 1978), German handball player
- Oliver Rohrbeck (born 1965), German actor
- Oliver P. Rood (1844–1885), American soldier
- Oliver Roome (1921–2009), British army officer
- Oliver Rosengren (born 1992), Swedish politician
- Oliver Ross (disambiguation)
- Oliver Rossiter (born 1991), English footballer
- Oliver Roth (disambiguation)
- Oliver Roup, Canadian entrepreneur
- Oliver Rousseau (1891–1977), American developer
- Oliver Rowland (born 1992), British racing driver
- Oliver Russell (born 1998), English rugby league footballer
- Oliver Russell, 2nd Baron Ampthill (1869–1935), British politician
- Oliver Ryan (footballer) (born 1985), English footballer

=== S ===
- Oliver Sacks (1933–2015), British-American neurologist and writer
- Oliver Sadler (born 1987), English cricketer
- Oliver Saffell (born 1986), English cricketer
- Oliver Sail (born 1996), New Zealand footballer
- Oliver Sain (1932–2003), American songwriter
- Oliver Saksak (born 1960), Vanuatuan judge
- Oliver Samuel (1849–1925), New Zealand politician
- Oliver Samuels (born 1948), Jamaican comedian
- Oliver Decesary Santos (born 1994), Brazilian recording artist, singer, footballer and mixed martial artist
- Oliver Sarkic (born 1997), English footballer
- Oliver Sartor, American oncologist
- Oliver Saunders (born 1986), Australian-Filipino rugby union footballer
- Oliver Saunyama (??–1980), Botswanan teacher
- Oliver Savell (born 2009), child actor
- Oliver Sayler (1887–1958), American writer
- Oliver Scarles (born 2005), English footballer
- Oliver Schaller (born 1994), Swiss badminton player
- Oliver Schmidhauser (born 2004), German footballer
- Oliver Schmidt (disambiguation)
- Oliver Schmitt (born 1973), Austrian professor
- Oliver Schmitt (footballer) (born 2000), German footballer
- Oliver Schmitz (born 1960), South African film director
- Oliver Schneller (born 1966), German composer
- Oliver Schnitzler (born 1995), German footballer
- Oliver Schnyder (born 1973), Swiss pianist
- Oliver Scholfield (born 1993), Canadian field hockey player
- Oliver Schöpf (born 1990), Austrian footballer
- Oliver Schreiner (1890–1980), South African judge
- Oliver Schröder (born 1980), German footballer
- Oliver Schroer (1956–2008), Canadian musician
- Oliver Schröm (born 1964), German investigative journalist
- Oliver Schweißing (born 1971), German footballer
- Oliver Schwerdt (born 1979), German musicologist
- Oliver Scott (1922–2016), English biologist
- Oliver Seack (born 1962), German canoeist
- Oliver Seibert (1881–1944), Canadian ice hockey player
- Oliver Selfridge (1926–2008), English businessman
- Oliver John Semmes (1839–1918), American admiral
- Oliver Semmle (born 1998), German footballer
- Oliver Sensen, German philosopher
- Oliver Seraphin (born 1943), Dominican politician
- Oliver Seth (1915–1996), American judge
- Oliver Setzinger (born 1983), Austrian ice hockey player
- Oliver B. Shallenberger (1860–1898), American engineer
- Oliver Shanks (1915–1970), Canadian boxer
- Oliver Shannon (born 1995), English footballer
- Oliver Shanti (born 1948), German musician
- Oliver Shaw (1779–1848), American composer
- Oliver Sheldon (1894–1951), English business administrator
- Oliver Shepard (born 1946), British explorer
- Oliver Sheppard (1865–1941), Irish sculptor
- Oliver Sherraden (1814–1881), American politician
- Oliver Sherwood (born 1955), British hunter
- Oliver Henry Shoup (1869–1940), American politician
- Oliver Sigurjónsson (born 1995), Icelandic footballer
- Oliver Silverholt (born 1994), Swedish footballer
- Oliver Simmonds (1897–1985), British aviator
- Oliver Simmons (disambiguation)
- Oliver Simon (born 1945), English priest
- Oliver Sims (1943–2015), British computer scientist
- Oliver Sinclair (disambiguation)
- Oliver Sipple (1941–1989), gay US Marine who foiled Sara Jane Moore's assassination attempt on President Gerald Ford
- Oliver Skeete (born 1956), British showjumper
- Oliver Skipp (born 2000), English footballer
- Oliver Slipper (born 1976), English cricketer
- Oliver Solberg (born 2001), Swedish-Norwegian racing driver
- Oliver Sollitt (1860–1945), American politician
- Oliver Sonne (born 2000), Danish footballer
- Oliver Sørensen (born 2002), Danish footballer
- Oliver Sorg (born 1990), German footballer
- Oliver Southern (born 2002), English footballer
- Oliver Smedley (1911–1989), English businessman
- Oliver Smith (disambiguation)
- Oliver Smithies (1925–2017), British-American geneticist
- Oliver R. Smoot (born 1940), American technology consultant
- Oliver G. Snow (1849–1931), American politician
- Oliver P. Snyder (1833–1882), American politician
- Oliver P. Snyder (Maryland politician) (??–1874), American politician
- Oliver Spasovski (born 1976), Macedonian politician
- Oliver L. Spaulding (1833–1922), American soldier and politician
- Oliver Lyman Spaulding (1875–1947), American army general
- Oliver Spencer (1736–1811), American military officer
- Oliver M. Spencer (1829–1895), American academic administrator
- Oliver Spencer-Wortley (born 1984), English composer
- Oliver Spiteri (born 1970), Maltese footballer
- Oliver M. W. Sprague (1873–1953), American economist
- Oliver Stamm (born 1966), Austrian beach volleyball player
- Oliver Stang (born 1988), German footballer
- Oliver Stanhope (born 1998), British Paralympic rower
- Oliver Stanisic (born 1994), Swiss footballer
- Oliver Stanley (1896–1950), British politician
- Oliver Stapleton (born 1948), English cinematographer
- Oliver Stark (born 1991), British actor
- Oliver Starkey (1523–1583/1586), English knight
- Oliver Starr (1883–1961), American judge
- Oliver St Clair (??–1523), Scottish noble
- Oliver Steurer (born 1995), German footballer
- Oliver Stevens (1825–1905), American attorney and politician
- Oliver Stević (born 1984), Serbian basketball player
- Oliver Stewart (1896–1976), English pilot ace
- Oliver W. Stewart (1867–1937), American politician
- Oliver Stierle (born 1983), German footballer
- Oliver St John (disambiguation)
- Oliver Stöckli (born 1976), Swiss footballer
- Oliver Stokes (born 1998), English actor
- Oliver Stokowski (born 1962), German actor
- Oliver Stone (born 1946), American film director
- Oliver Stonor (1903–1987), English novelist
- Oliver E. Story (1885–1961), American composer
- Oliver Strachey (1874–1960), British civil servant
- Oliver Stritzel (born 1957), German actor
- Oliver Strunk (1901–1980), American musicologist
- Oliver Strunz (born 2000), Austrian footballer
- Oliver Stuenkel (born 1982), German-Brazilian political scientist
- Oliver Stummvoll (born 1995), Austrian fashion model
- Oliver Stutchbury (1927–2011), British politician
- Oliver Sundberg (born 1982), Danish speedskater
- Oliver Sutton (disambiguation)
- Oliver Swann (1878–1948), British military officer
- Oliver Sykes (born 1986), English singer-songwriter

=== T ===
- Oliver Tambo (1917–1993), South African politician
- Oliver Tank, Australian musician
- Oliver Taplin (born 1943), British academic
- Oliver Tappin (1893–1945), American politician
- Oliver Tarney (born 1970), British sound engineer
- Oliver Tärnström (born 2002), Swedish ice hockey player
- Oliver Taylor (disambiguation)
- Oliver Perry Temple (1820–1907), American attorney
- Oliver Thomas (born 1957), American politician
- Oliver Thompson (born 1988), English musician
- Oliver Thornton (born 1979), Welsh singer
- Oliver Thychosen (born 1993), Danish footballer
- Oliver Tichy (born 1975), Austrian racing driver
- Oliver Tickell, British journalist
- Oliver Tipton (born 2003), English footballer
- Oliver Tobias (born 1947), English actor
- Oliver Todd (1916–2001), American musician
- Oliver Toledo (born 1987), Chilean footballer
- Oliver Tomaszczyk (born 1986), English rugby union footballer
- Oliver Tomkins (1908–1992), English bishop
- Oliver Fellows Tomkins (1873–1901), English missionary
- Oliver Tomlinson (born 2002), English footballer
- Oliver Tompsett (born 1981), British actor
- Oliver Samuel Tonks (1874–1953), American historian
- Óliver Torres (born 1994), Spanish footballer
- Oliver Townend (born 1982), British jockey
- Oliver G. Traphagen (1854–1932), American architect
- Oliver Tree (1993–2026), American singer-songwriter
- Oliver Tress (born 1967), British businessman
- Oliver Treyz (1918–1998), American television executive
- Oliver Trinder (1907–1981), British fencer
- Oliver Tummon (1884–1955), English footballer
- Oliver Turnbull (1919–2009), Scottish rugby union footballer
- Oliver Turvey (born 1987), British racing driver

=== U ===
- Oliver Ulloth (born 1983), German politician
- Oliver A. Unger (1914–1981), American film producer
- Oliver Unsöld (born 1973), German footballer
- Oliver Uppill (1876–1946), Australian politician
- Oliver Urso (born 1999), Danish footballer

=== V ===
- Oliver Vachell (1518–1564), English politician
- Oliver deGray Vanderbilt (1884–1960), American basketball player
- Oliver Vardy (1906–1980), Canadian broadcaster
- Oliver Vaquer, American actor
- Oliver Venno (born 1990), Estonian volleyball player
- Oliver Villadsen (born 2001), Danish footballer
- Oliver Vitouch (born 1971), Austrian psychologist
- Oliver Vogt (born 1977), German politician
- Oliver von Dohnányi (born 1955), Slovak conductor
- Oliver Vujović (born 1969), German-Austrian journalist

=== W ===
- Oliver Wähling (born 1999), German footballer
- Oliver Wahlstrom (born 2000), Swedish-American ice hockey player
- Oliver Wainwright (born 1984), British architecture critic
- Oliver Wakefield (1909–1956), British actor
- Oliver Wakeman (born 1972), English musician
- Oliver Walker (disambiguation)
- Oliver Wallace (1887–1963), British composer and conductor
- Oliver Wallop, 8th Earl of Portsmouth (1861–1943), British politician
- Oliver Walther (born 1972), German gymnast
- Oliver Winston Wanger (born 1940), American judge
- Oliver Wardrop (1864–1948), British diplomat
- Oliver Warner (1903–1976), British historian
- Oliver Warner (politician) (1818–1885), American politician
- Oliver Watts, Australian artist
- Oliver Patterson Watts (1865–1953), American chemical engineer
- Oliver Webb (born 1991), British auto racing driver
- Oliver Weber (born 1970), German photographer
- Oliver Weeks, English composer
- Oliver Weerasinghe (1907–1980), Sri Lankan architect
- Oliver Weindling (born 1955), British jazz promoter
- Oliver Weiss, German-American soccer coach
- Oliver Welden (1946–2021), Chilean poet
- Oliver Welke (born 1966), German television presenter
- Oliver Elwin Wells (1853–1922), American educator
- Oliver Westerbeek (born 1966), German footballer
- Oliver Wheeler (1890–1962), Canadian surveyor
- Oliver Whiddon, English archdeacon
- Oliver Whitby (1602–1679), English priest
- Oliver White (disambiguation)
- Oliver Whitehead (born 1948), English musician
- Oliver John Whitley (1912–2005), English broadcasting administrator
- Oliver Whyte (born 2000), New Zealand footballer
- Oliver Wickes (1757–1855), American officer in the Revolutionary War
- Oliver Widmann (born 2001), German cyclist
- Oliver Widmer (born 1965), Swiss musician
- Oliver James Wilcox (1869–1917), Canadian politician
- Oliver Wilde (born 1988), English musician
- Oliver C. Wiley (1851–1917), American politician
- Oliver Wilkes (born 1980), Scottish rugby league footballer
- Oliver Wilkes (rower) (born 1995), British rower
- Oliver Williams (disambiguation)
- Oliver E. Williamson (1932–2020), American economist
- Oliver Wilson (born 1980), English golfer
- Oliver Wilson (rugby league) (born 2000), English rugby league footballer
- Oliver Winchester (1810–1880), American businessman
- Oliver Windholz, German corporate executive
- Oliver Winterbottom (1944–2020), British automotive designer
- Oliver Wittke (born 1966), German politician
- Oliver Wolcott (1726–1797), American politician
- Oliver Wolcott Jr. (1760–1833), American politician and judge
- Oliver Wonekha (born 1951), Ugandan politician
- Oliver Wood (disambiguation)
- Oliver Woodward (1885–1966), Australian metallurgist
- Oliver Wright (disambiguation)
- Oliver Wrong (1925–2012), English academic
- Oliver Reynolds Wulf (1897–1987), American chemist
- Oliver Wyman (actor), American voice actor
- Oliver Wynne-Griffith (born 1994), British rower
- Oliver Wyss (born 1974), Swiss football manager

=== Y ===
- Oliver Yantis (1869–1892), American outlaw
- Oliver Youll (born 1970), English cricketer
- Oliver Young (1855–1908), English naval officer

=== Z ===
- Oliver Zahn, German-American astrophysicist
- Oliver Zandén (born 2001), Swedish footballer
- Oliver Zangwill (1913–1987), British neuropsychologist
- Oliver Zapel (born 1968), German footballer
- Oliver Zaugg (born 1981), Swiss cyclist
- Oliver Zeidler (born 1996), German rower
- Oliver Zelenika (born 1993), Croatian footballer
- Oliver Zhang (born 1997), Canadian-Japanese ice dancer
- Oliver Zipse (born 1964), German corporate executive
- Oliver Zompro, German biologist
- Oliver Zono (born 1991), South African rugby union footballer

== Fictional characters ==
- Oliver Babish, in the political drama series The West Wing
- Oliver Barnes, in the soap opera Neighbours
- Oliver Beene, a main titular character series on the same name
- Oliver de Boys, a character in William Shakespeare's play As You Like It
- Oliver "Ladykiller" Biscuit, a character in the video game Grand Theft Auto: Vice City
- Oliver B. Bumble, in a comic book series by Marten Toonder
- Oliver Carswell, in the video game Far Cry 3
- Oliver Wendell Douglas, in the sitcom Green Acres
- Oliver Fish, in the drama series One Life to Live
- Oliver Grayson, in the comic book series Invincible
- Oliver Haddo, in W. Somerset Maugham's novel The Magician
- Oliver Hampton, in the American television series How to Get Away with Murder
- Oliver Jones (The Bold and the Beautiful), on the American soap opera The Bold and the Beautiful
- Oliver Wendell Jones, in the comic strip Bloom County
- Oliver Lightload, in the movie Cars
- Oliver Mace, in the spy drama series Spooks
- Sir Oliver Martex, in the William Shakespeare's play As You Like It
- Oliver Oken, in the television series Hannah Montana
- Oliver Osnick, the Marvel Comics superhero Steel Spider
- Oliver Pook, in the television series Henry Danger
- Oliver Putnam, in the television series Only Murders in the Building
- Oliver Queen, alter ego of DC Comics character Green Arrow
  - Oliver Queen (Arrowverse), a television adaptation of the character
- Oliver Queenan, in the 2006 film The Departed
- Oliver Sabel, in the soap opera Verbotene Liebe
- Oliver Surface, in Richard Brinsley Sheridan's play The School for Scandal
- Oliver Trask, in the television series The O.C.
- Oliver Twist (character), the main character of Charles Dickens' novel Oliver Twist
- Oliver Valentine, in the drama television series Holby City
- Oliver Van Rossum, in the animated television series Rocket Power
- Oliver "Daddy" Warbucks, ir on the comic strip Little Orphan Annie
- Oliver Wilkerson, in the animated series The Cleveland Show
- Oliver Wood (Harry Potter), in the Harry Potter fantasy franchise
- Oliver Wright, in the 1981 musical satire film Shock Treatment
- Oliver (paladin), a paladin featured in the Matter of France
- Oliver, an engine in The Railway Series books
- Oliver (Thomas and Friends character), a locomotive in the Thomas and Friends franchise
- Oliver, the title character of the Disney animated film Oliver & Company

== See also ==
- Oliver (chimpanzee)
- Oliver (surname)
- Oliver (disambiguation)
- Olivier (surname)
- Olivier (given name)
- Olivier (disambiguation)
