= Bobby Haarms =

Dutch footballer (1934–2009)

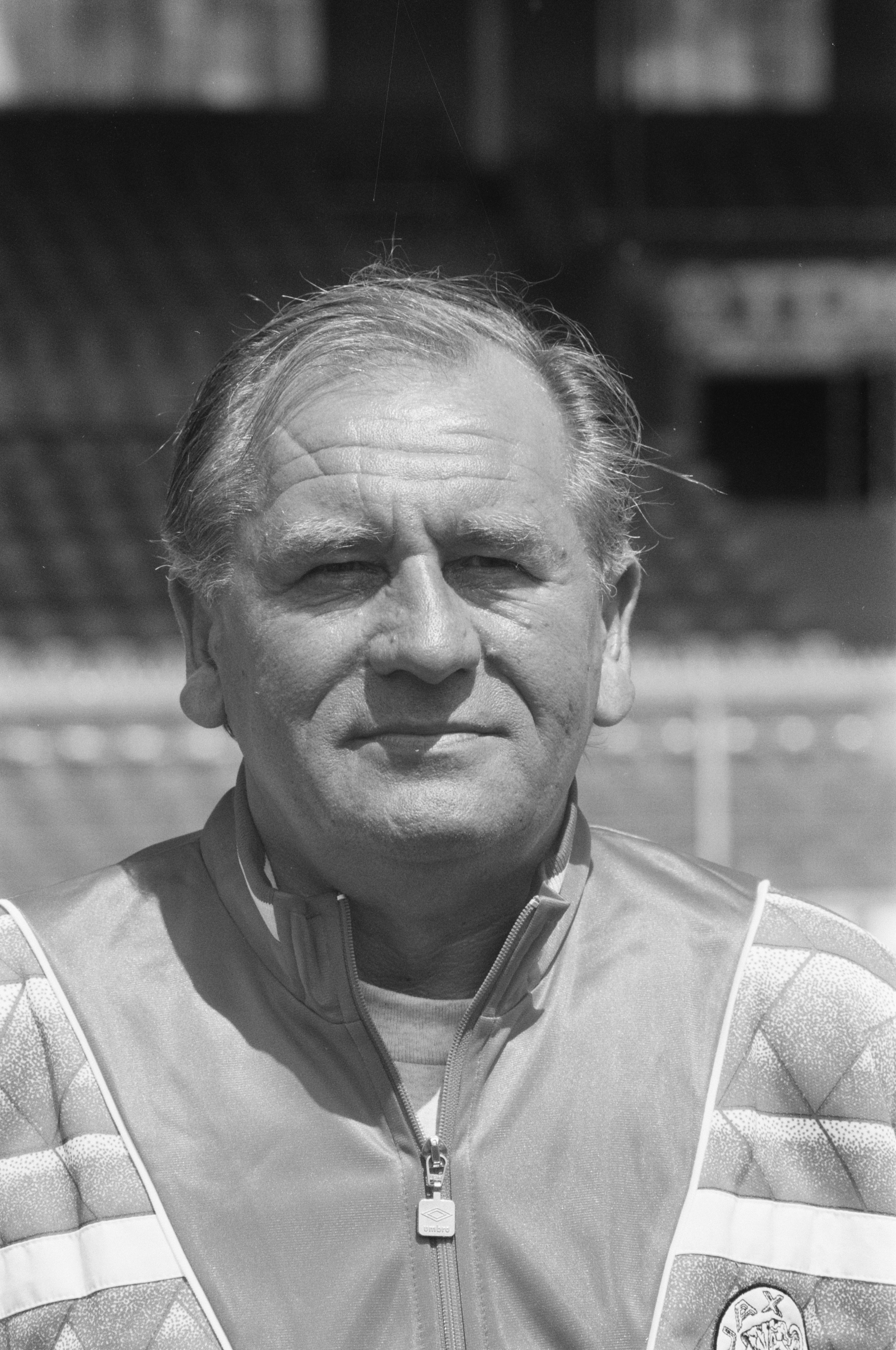
- Haarms in 1989

Personal information
- Date of birth: 8 March 1934
- Place of birth: Amsterdam, Netherlands
- Date of death: 6 June 2009 (aged 75)
- Place of death: Amsterdam, Netherlands
- Position: Midfielder

Youth career
- 1947–1952: Ajax

Senior career*
Years	Team	Apps	(Gls)
1952–1960	Ajax	58	(1)

Managerial career
- 1967–1981: Ajax (assistant manager)
- 1974: Ajax (interim)
- 1981–1982: Ajax (Scout)
- 1982–1984: VV Aalsmeer
- 1984–1986: FC Volendam (assistant manager)
- 1986–2000: Ajax (assistant manager)
- 1988–1989: Ajax (interim)
- * Club domestic league appearances and goals

Bobby Haarms (8 March 1934 – 6 June 2009) was a Dutch professional football player and coach.

== Playing career ==
A midfielder, Haarms joined the youth team of Ajax in 1947 and made his senior debut in 1952. Between 1952 and 1960, Haarms made 58 appearances for Ajax, scoring once, before he had to retire due to a knee injury.

== Coaching career ==
Haarms was an assistant manager at Ajax from 1967 to 1981, and was interim manager briefly in 1974. He scouted for Ajax between 1981 and 1982, before leaving to become Manager of VV Aalsmeer. He became assistant at Volendam from 1984 to 1986, before returning to Ajax, where he was once again an assistant manager from 1986 to 2000 (minus a second spell as Interim Manager from 1988 to 1989). Born opposite of Ajax' former De Meer Stadion, he worked as a rehabilitation coach for the club and was therefore nicknamed De Goede Beul (the Good Executioner).

== Later life and death ==
Haarms died on 6 June 2009, aged 75.
