= Bauchau =

Bauchau is a surname. Notable people with the surname include:

- Henry Bauchau (1913–2012), Belgian psychoanalyst, lawyer, and author
- Oliver Bauchau, American aerospace engineer
- Patrick Bauchau (born 1938), Belgian actor
