= Huyshe =

Huyshe is both a surname and a given name. Notable people with the name include:

- Oliver Huyshe (1885–1960), English cricketer
- Huyshe Yeatman-Biggs (1845–1922), English Anglican bishop
