= Oliveiros =

Masculine given name

- Pronunciation: Galician: [oh-lee-VEH-rohs], European Portuguese: [oh-lee-VAY-roosh], Brazilian Portuguese: [oh-lee-VAY-rohs]
- Gender: masculine

Other names
- Derived: olive tree
- Usage: Galician, Portuguese
- Related names: Oliver

Oliveiros is a masculine given name form of Oliver.

Notable people with the name include:

- Oliveiros Ferreira (1929-2017), Brazilian writer
- Oliveiros Guanais (1936-2010), Brazilian anesthesiologist
