= Oliver Poole =

Oliver Poole may refer to:

- Oliver Poole, 1st Baron Poole (1911–1993), British Conservative politician, soldier and businessman
- Oliver Poole (journalist) (born 1972), British journalist and author
- Oliver Poole (musician) (born 1991), British pianist and composer
- Ollie Poole (1922–2009), American football player
