= Oliver Burke (disambiguation) =

Oliver Burke (born 1997) is a Scottish footballer.

Oliver Burke may also refer to:

- Oliver Burke (priest) (1598–1672), Welsh priest
- Oliver J. Burke (1825–1889), Irish barrister
