= Oliver Rifai =

Dutch footballer (born 1993)

Personal information
- Full name: Oliver Sucipto Rifai
- Date of birth: 15 June 1993 (age 33)
- Place of birth: Amsterdam, Netherlands
- Height: 1.83 m (6 ft 0 in)
- Positions: Defensive midfielder; centre back

Team information
- Current team: FC Aalsmeer
- Number: 15

Youth career
- HFC
- EDO
- AZ

Senior career*
Years	Team	Apps	(Gls)
2012–2015	Telstar	67	(0)
2015–2017	FC Lisse	21	(0)
2017–2018	FC Rijnvogels	0	(0)
2018–2019	SV Zandvoort	0	(0)
2019–2021	VV HBOK	0	(0)
2021–2022	SV Hoofddorp	0	(0)
2022–	FC Aalsmeer	0	(0)

International career
2009	Netherlands U16	1	(0)
2010	Netherlands U17	1	(0)
- * Club domestic league appearances and goals as of 11 May 2015 (UTC)

Oliver Sucipto Rifai (born 15 June 1993) is a Dutch professional footballer who plays as a defensive midfielder or centre back for Vierde Klasse club FC Aalsmeer.

== Personal life ==
Born in the Netherlands, Rifai is of Indonesian descent.
