= Oliver Plunkett (disambiguation) =

Oliver Plunkett (1625–1681) was an Irish archbishop.

Oliver Plunkett may also refer to:

- Oliver Plunkett, 1st Baron Louth (??–1555), Irish politician
- Oliver Plunkett (judge) (1884–1971), British judge
