= Oliver Duff =

Oliver Duff may refer to:

- Oliver Duff (New Zealand editor) (1883–1967), New Zealand writer and editor
- Oliver Duff (British editor) (born 1983), British journalist and newspaper editor

== See also ==
- Oliver Duff Greene (1833–1904), American Union Army officer
