= Oliver Buchmueller =

German particle physicist

- Born: Oliver L. Buchmueller
- Education: Heidelberg University
- Known for: The standard model Supersymmetry (SUSY); The Higgs Boson; The Dark Matter; Gravitational wave detection
- Scientific career
- Fields: Particle physics
- Workplaces: Imperial College London; CERN; SLAC National Accelerator Laboratory

Oliver Buchmueller is a scientist and professor of physics at the Faculty of Natural Science, Imperial College London. Buchmueller is presently serving as one of the lead scientists on the Compact Muon Solenoid experiment at CERN’s Large Hadron Collider, the principal investigator of the Atom Interferometer Observatory and Network and also one of the lead authors at Atomic Experiment for Dark Matter and Gravity Exploration in Space (AEDGE). Previously he has been associated with the ALEPH experiment at CERN’s LEP collider and the BaBar experiment at SLAC. Buchmueller was among the group of scientists responsible for the discovery of Higgs Boson particle at the LHC, CERN and later in the scientific exploration to find the traces of dark matter through the LHC.

== Biography ==
Following support from the Landesgraduiertenförderung, Baden-Württemberg (Scholarship) and Graduiertenkolleg Heidelberg (Scholarship), Buchmueller received his doctorate from Heidelberg University in 1999. From 1999 to 2001 he was a CERN fellow at the ALEPH Experiment studying properties of the Z and W Bosons and in 2001 he joined SLAC as a research associate to work on the BABAR experiment. He returned to CERN in 2004 as research staff member of the organization making important contributions to the construction, commissioning, and physics exploitation of the CMS experiment. He has been associated with Imperial College of London since 2009 as a professor.

=== CMS Experimentation at CERN ===
Buchmueller joined Compact Muon Solenoid experiment at CERN in 2003. During 2004-2005 he served as the convener of the Tracker alignment group. During 2005-2007 he has been the co-convenor of Calibration and Alignment group. In 2007, he initiated The MasterCode Project along with theoreticians and other scientists with the aim to interpret the data related to LHC results in better fashion. In 2008-2009 he was in charge of the Physics group as co-leader and taking care of researches regarding supersymmetry (SUSY) and later he became the member of the Physics Management Office. He was the chair of CMS analysis review committee while examining the data analysis for developing and overseeing the scientific validity of the key ‘diphoton’ discovery and subsequent characterization channel. In September 2016, Buchmueller was nominated as the convener of the EXOTICA search group in CMS. He is presently serving as the editor of Supersymmetry (SUSY) related topics at Particle Physics Data Group.

=== Atom Interferometer Observatory and Network ===
Buchmueller is presently serving as the Principal Investigator of The Atom Interferometer Observatory and Network where he was appointed in 2018. The network is an inter-university collaborative effort involving King's College London, the University of Liverpool, the University of Oxford, University of Birmingham, the University of Cambridge and STFC Rutherford Appleton Laboratory while being led by Imperial College of London. The aim of the project is the exploration of the dark matter and gravitational waves and to ascertain viable options for applying and implementing quantum technology in commercial domain. As Buchmueller said, the network is designed to "harness cold atom technologies" in order to explore fundamental concerns of fundamental physics, astrophysics and cosmology. The project received £7.2m funding from UK Research and Innovation and £2.5m for the involved institutions in January 2021 for developing the first large-scale atom interferometer in the UK.

== Notable works and publications ==
- Bertoldi, A., Bongs, K., Bouyer, P. et al. AEDGE: Atomic experiment for dark matter and gravity exploration in space. Exp Astron (2021). doi:10.1007/s10686-021-09701-3
- Zyla PA, Barnett RM, Beringer J, et al., 2020, Review of Particle Physics, Progress of Theoretical and Experimental Physics, Vol:2020, ISSN 2050-3911
- El-Neaj YA, Alpigiani C, Amairi-Pyka S, et al., 2020, AEDGE: Atomic Experiment for Dark Matter and Gravity Exploration in Space, Epj Quantum Technology, Vol:7, ISSN 2662-4400
- Badurina L, Bentine E, Blas D, et al., 2020, AION: an atom interferometer observatory and network, Journal of Cosmology and Astroparticle Physics, ISSN 1475-7516
- Boveia A, Buchmueller O, Busoni G, et al., 2020, Recommendations on presenting LHC searches for missing transverse energy signals using simplified s-channel models of dark matter, Physics of the Dark Universe, Vol:27, ISSN 2212-6864
- Khachatryan V, Sirunyan AM, Tumasyan A, et al., 2014, Observation of the diphoton decay of the Higgs boson and measurement of its properties, European Physical Journal C, Vol:74, ISSN 1434-6044
- Buchmueller O, Dolan MJ, Malik SA, et al., 2015, Characterising dark matter searches at colliders and direct detection experiments: vector mediators, The Journal of High Energy Physics, Vol:2015, ISSN 1029-8479
- Buchmueller O, Dolan MJ, McCabe C, 2014, Beyond effective field theory for dark matter searches at the LHC, The Journal of High Energy Physics, Vol:2014, ISSN 1029-8479
- Chatrchyan S, Khachatryan V, Sirunyan AM, et al., 2012, Search for the standard model Higgs boson decaying into two photons in pp collisions at root s=7 TeV, Physics Letters B, Vol:710, ISSN 0370-2693, Pages:403-425
- Buchmueller O, Cavanaugh R, De Roeck A, et al., 2007, Prediction for the lightest Higgs boson mass in the CMSSM using indirect experimental constraints, Physics Letters B, Vol:657, ISSN 0370-2693, Pages:87-94
- Buchmüller OL, Flächer HU, 2006, Fit to moments of inclusive B→Xcν̄ and B→Xsγ decay distributions using heavy quark expansions in the kinetic scheme, Physical Review D, Vol:73, ISSN 1550-7998
