= Oliver Monksfield =

English footballer

Oliver John Monksfield (born 1981) is an international footballer. He represented Great Britain at the 20th Deaflympic Games held in Melbourne in 2005, winning a gold medal. He competed again in the 2009 Deaflympic Games in Taipei.
