= Oliver J. Burke =

Irish historian and barrister

Oliver Joseph Burke (1825-1889) was an Irish barrister and historian.

Born at Ower, Headford, County Galway, he was educated at Trinity College, Dublin from 1841, graduating with a B.A. in 1854, the same year he was called to the Irish Bar.

== Bibliography ==
- The Abbey of Ross, Co. Galway - its history and details, E. Ponsonby, Dublin, 1868.
- The History of the Lord Chancellors of Ireland from A.D. 1186 to A.D. 1874, E. Ponsonby, Dublin, 1879.
- The History of the Catholic Archbishops of Tuam, from the foundation of the See to the death of the Most Rev. John MacHale, D.D., A.D. 1881, Hodges Figgis, Dublin, 1882.
- Anecdotes of the Connaught Circuit from its foundation in 1604 to close upon the present time, Hodges Figges, Dublin, 1885.
- The South Isles of Aran, Co. Galway, Kegan, Paul, Trench & Co., London, 1887.
