= Oliver Jackson =

Oliver Jackson may refer to:

- Oliver Jackson (musician) (1933–1994), American jazz drummer
- Oliver David Jackson (1919–2004), Australian Army officer
- Oliver Lee Jackson (born 1935), American painter, printmaker, sculptor, and educator
- Oliver Toussaint Jackson (1862–1948), American businessman and entrepreneur
- Ollie Jackson (born 1984), British racing driver

== See also ==
- Oliver Jackson-Cohen (born 1986), English actor and model
