= Oliver Hart =

Oliver Hart may refer to:

- Oliver Hart (economist) (born 1948), British-born American economist at Harvard University
- Oliver Hart (musician) (1981–2010), pseudonym of the American musician Eyedea
- Oliver Hart (speedway rider) (1912–1983), English international speedway rider
- Oliver J. Hart (1892–1978), bishop of the Episcopal Diocese of Pennsylvania
