= Oliver Hill =

Oliver Hill may refer to:

- Oliver Hill (architect) (1887–1968), British architect
- Oliver Hill (attorney) (1907–2007), American attorney
- Oliver Hill (baseball) (1909–1970), American baseball player
- Oliver Hill (musician) (born 1990), American musician with the band Pavo Pavo
- Oliver Hill Railway on Rottnest Island, Australia

== See also ==
- Oliver Hill (Peak District), a hill in Staffordshire, England
