= Oliver Kelley =

Oliver Kelley may refer to:

- Oliver Hudson Kelley (1826–1913), co-founders of the National Grange of the Order of Patrons of Husbandry
- Oliver K. Kelley (1904–1987), American automotive engineer

== See also ==
- Oliver Kelly (c. 1777–1834), Roman Catholic archbishop
