= Oliver G. Richard =

American businessman (born 1952)

Oliver G. "Rick" Richard, III (born 1952) is an American businessman. He is currently the president of Empire of the Seed, a Louisianan consulting firm, and chairman of CleanFuel USA. He achieved national prominence for his work in the changing northeast energy sector.

He was chairman, president and chief executive of the Fortune 500 company Columbia Energy Group; chairman, president and chief executive of the Fortune 1000 company New Jersey Resources; president and chief executive of Northern Natural Gas Pipeline; and vice president of Tenngasco.

He served on the Federal Energy Regulatory Commission as a commissioner from 1982 to 1985.

== Early life ==
Richard was born (1952) and raised in Lake Charles, Louisiana. He married Donna Guzman July 6, 1974. They have one son.

== Education ==
Richard earned a Bachelor of Arts in journalism from Louisiana State University in 1974. He went on to earn a Juris Doctor from the Paul M. Hebert Law Center in 1977, and a Master of Law in taxation from Georgetown University in 1981.

He was awarded the LSU Foundation's President's Award in 2003.

== Career ==
Richard was made CEO of the Herndon-based Columbia Energy Group in April 1995. He ran the company until its merger with NiSource in November 2000.
