= Oliver Plunkett (judge) =

British judge (1884–1971)

Oliver Plunkett (1884 – 1971) was a British judge in Palestine and Egypt.

== Biography ==
Oliver Plunkett was born in 1884 in Dublin, Ireland. In 1909 became a member of the Irish bar. During World War I he served in the British Army, in the frontiers of France and Flanders, and was wounded twice. After the war he joined the Colonial Service, and became Chief Justice of Saint Lucia in 1923.

In 1928, he became government advocate in Palestine. He was relieving President of the District Court in 1929 and became President of the District Court in 1934. He was one of the judges in the Assassination of Haim Arlosoroff trial.

During World War II, two of his sons were killed while serving in the British Army: Oliver Peter Plunkett, a pilot in the RAF killed in 1941, and lieutenant Gw Plunkett, of the light Anti-Aircraft Royal Artillery, killed in 1943.

In April 1945, Plunkett was appointed president of the Mixed Courts of Egypt.
