= Oliver Cary =

Irish Anglican priest

Oliver Cary (1752 - 1846) was an Irish Anglican priest.

Cary was born in County Roscommon and educated at Trinity College, Dublin. He was appointed Archdeacon of Elphin in 1798. He resigned in 1809 for the Prebendal Stall of Kilcooley in Elphin Cathedral.
