= Oliver Kaul =

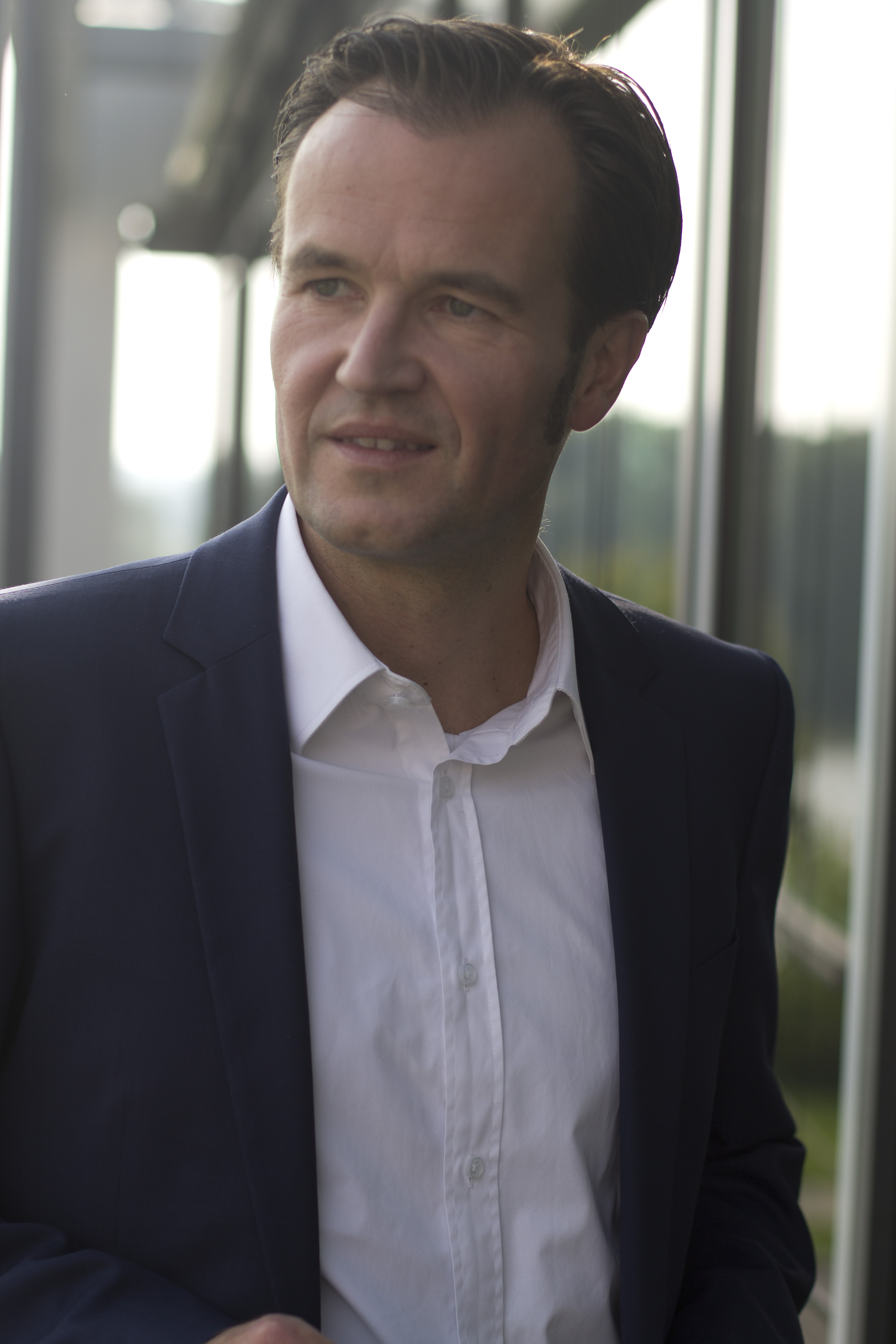
Oliver Kaul

Oliver Kaul is a Professor of Marketing and International Management at University of Applied Sciences, Mainz.

== Background ==
Oliver Kaul studied Economics at the University of Giessen, graduating in 1994. He subsequently obtained his doctorate in Business Administration and Marketing at the Johannes Gutenberg University Mainz and at the Columbia University New York. His post-doctoral thesis was on the subject of “Competitors’ reputation for aggressiveness – A key construct in marketing competition”. Since 2003 he has held the chair of International Business and Management in the Economics department at University of Applied Sciences, Mainz. His subject areas include Marketing and Strategic Management. He has spent time on research projects at the Columbia Business School (USA) and the Hong Kong University of Science and Technology (China). He has also presented the results of his research to leading Business Schools in Europe, the USA and Asia, including UC Berkeley (USA), New York University (USA), Columbia University (USA), University of California, Los Angeles (USA), INSEAD (France) and Humboldt University of Berlin (Germany).

== Key areas of research and consultancy ==
The key areas of Oliver Kaul’s research include competition-orientated marketing strategies, as well as qualitative and quantitative market research projects. As an expert in Pricing and Innovation he undertakes research projects on data-based recommendations for maximum risk reduction in innovation and pricing decisions. His activities extend to Shopper and Consumer Research and Consumer-Centric marketing strategies. His other research and consultancy activities lie in the areas of new product launches, product variation and the development of corresponding simulation models for forecasting expected market share and/or volume changes on the basis of conjoint analyses. Kaul is a co-founder of the m3-Forum. M3 stands for Marketing, Management, Mainz and offers a platform for top business decision-makers to present current issues to students based on practical experience.

== Company founder ==
In 1998 Kaul founded the consultancy company smartcon GmbH and is still today Chairman of the Academic Board. This Marketing Research Institute with its headquarters in Mainz is a Research and Consultancy company with close links to academia, which is active across diverse sectors in over 40 countries. The key areas in which smartcon GmbH works include shopper and consumer research, as well as volume forecasting to support decision-making on innovation and pricing. Smartcon’s other areas of activity include the measurement and monitoring of image and customer satisfaction. Under the academic leadership of Prof. Kaul, smartcon GmbH advises leading companies in the B2C and B2B sectors.
