= Oliver Simmons =

Oliver Simmons may refer to:

- Oliver George Simmons (1878–1948), Wright brothers aviator
- Oliver Simmons (Canadian politician) (1835–1903)

== See also ==
- Oliver Simmonds (1897–1985), British aviation pioneer and politician.
