= Oliver Byrne =

Oliver Byrne may refer to:

- Oliver Byrne (football chairman) (1944–2007), CEO of Irish soccer club Shelbourne F.C.
- Oliver Byrne (mathematician) (1810–1880), Irish mathematician, engineer and writer
