= Oliver Proske =

German designer, producer and managing director

Oliver Proske (born 21 September 1971 in Johannesburg) is a German stage designer, industrial designer, exhibition designer, producer and managing director. In 1998 he founded the Berlin-based independent theatre company Nico and the Navigators together with his partner Nicola Hümpel.

== Stage designs ==
- 1998 Ich war auch schon einmal in Amerika
- 1999 Lucky Days, Fremder!
- 2000 Eggs on Earth
- 2001 Lilli in Putgarden
- 2002 Der Fammileinrat
- 2003 Kain, Wenn & Aber
- 2004 HELden & KleinMUT
- 2006 Wo Du nicht bist
- 2007 Niels Arms and Songs
- 2008 Obwohl ich dich kenne
- 2009 Anæsthesia
- 2009 Ombra & Luce
- 2010 Orlando
- 2011 Cantatatanz
- 2011 Petite messe solennelle
- 2012 Angels’ Share
- 2012 Mahlermania
- 2013 Shakespeare's Sonnets – Hate me when thou wilt
- 2014 Die Befristeten
- 2015 Die Stunde da wir zu viel voneinander wussten
- 2016 Reigen
- 2017 Silent Songs into the wild

== Exhibitions ==
- 2008 Dinge der Welt
- 2012 Cicadas

== Product design ==
- 2001 Leuchte Melampos at ClassiCon

== Bibliography ==
- Laura Berman, Madlene Therese Feyrer: Klang zu Gang – Gedanken zur Musik in heutigen Theaterformen. Theater der Zeit Verlag, Berlin, 2009, ISBN 978-3-940737-65-6.
- Nico and the Navigators: An der Erde hängt der Mensch und an ihm der Himmel. Theater der Zeit Verlag, Berlin, 2013, ISBN 978-3-943881-60-8.
- Babette Kraus: Die Berliner Performance/Theater-Gruppe Nico and The Navigators: Werkzyklus 'Menschenbilder' – Auf der Suche nach der verlorenen Identität. GRIN Verlag, München, 2002, ISBN 978-3-656-76010-8
- Torsten Maß, Christoph Werner: Theater der Welt: Komm! Ins Offene. Mitteldeutscher Verlag, Halle, 2008, ISBN 978-3-898125-67-3.
