= Oliver Jennings =

Oliver Jennings may refer to:

- Oliver Burr Jennings (1825–1893), Standard Oil businessman
- Oliver Gould Jennings (1865–1936), son of the Standard Oil businessman

== See also ==
- Oliver Gould Jennings House
