= Oliver Perry =

Oliver Perry may refer to:

- Oliver Hazard Perry (1785–1819), American naval commander
- Oliver Henry Perry (1815–1882), American politician

== See also ==
- Oliver Perry Hay (1846–1930), American paleontologist
- Oliver Perry Temple (1820–1907), American attorney
- Oliver Perry-Smith (1884–1969), American mountaineer
