= Oliver Cooper (disambiguation) =

Oliver Cooper (born 1989), is an American actor.

Oliver Cooper may also refer to:

- Oliver Cooper (politician) (born 1987), English politician
- Ollie Cooper (born 1999), Welsh footballer

== See also ==
- Olive Cooper (1892–1987), American screenwriter
