= Oliver Noonan =

American photographer (1939–1969)

- Born: 1 November 1939; Norwell, Massachusetts, United States
- Died: 16 August 1969 (aged 29); South Vietnam
- Cause of death: Shot down in helicopter
- Occupation: Freelance photographer
- Employer: Associated Press

Oliver Noonan (November 1, 1939 – August 19, 1969) was a free-lance photographer for The Boston Globe. He was killed when the helicopter he was aboard was shot down over the jungle about 30 miles (48 km) south of Da Nang, South Vietnam. He was taking photos of the Vietnam War for The Globe.

== Death ==
On 12 August 1969, People's Army of Vietnam (PAVN) forces attacked a remote American fire base overlooking the Song Chang Valley some 30 miles south of Da Nang. In the battle that followed, a helicopter carrying a battalion commander and seven other persons including Noonan, went down with the loss of all on board. A major effort ensued to reach the site of the crash and to recover the bodies. Over five days of fighting, the 196th Infantry Brigade (Light) accounted for an estimated 524 PAVN killed while losing 34 of its own men.

The day he died he took exclusive photos of fierce fighting but the helicopter he flew in to get them to Da Nang was shot down. The film survived.
