= Oliver King (disambiguation) =

Oliver King may refer to:

- Oliver King (c. 1432–1503), Bishop of Exeter, Bath and Wells, and restorer of Bath Abbey
- Oliver King (composer) (1855–1923), British composer, pianist, organist, and conductor
- Oliver King (snooker player) (born 1970), English snooker player

== See also ==
- King Oliver (1881–1938), American jazz player and bandleader
- Olive Kelso King (1885–1958), Australian adventurer and mountain climber who served in World War I as an ambulance driver, volunteer, and aircraft examiner
- Leroy Oliver King (1921–2004), American basketball player
