= Oliver T. Hellriegel =

German–American author and consultant (born 1965)

Oliver T Hellriegel
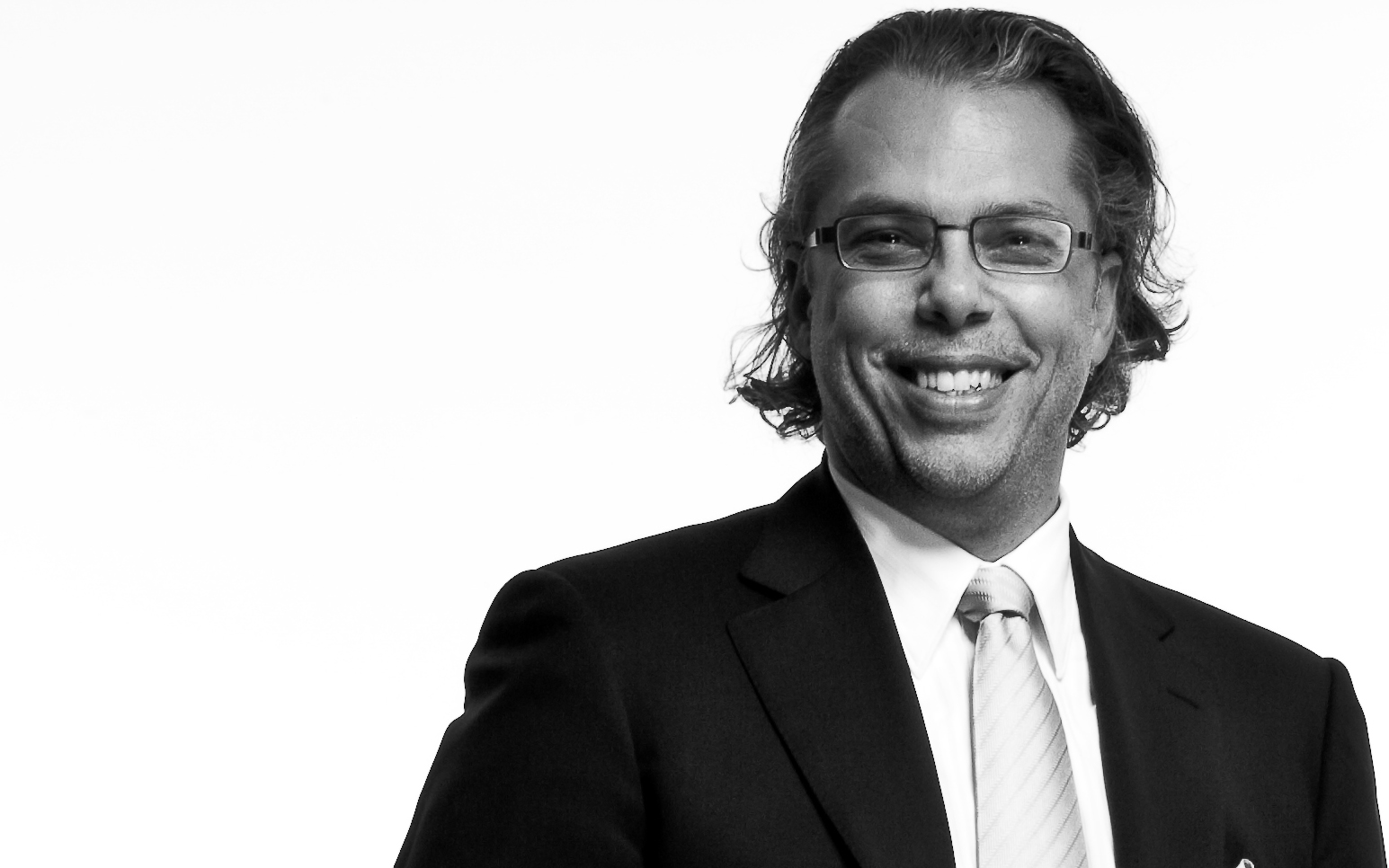
- Hellriegel, 2008
- Born: July 30, 1965 (age 61); Kaiserslautern, Germany
- Education: Kaiserslautern University of Technology; University of Applied Sciences, Mainz
- Occupations: Author, Marketing Professor and Consultant
- Website: www.hellriegel.net

Oliver T. Hellriegel (born July 30, 1965) is a German–American author and consultant.

== Career ==
Hellriegel heads the international MBA program at Macromedia University in Germany, where he is also teaching Foresight, Innovation and Leadership classes. He has been part of a digital learning initiative on Design Thinking. Before joining Macromedia, he has been a faculty member in various universities since 2007, and held a position as Dean of Studies in Visual and Corporate Communications at Fresenius University's School of Design.

Oliver T. Hellriegel co-authored a book on Social Media (Social Media Compass) and is considered a researcher in the field of effects on interpersonal relationships as well as using social media for news purposes. He is a frequent author in of Germany's leading magazines on digital transformation: iBusiness as well as in various magazines and books. He has been speaking at several research conferences all over Europe (Glocal: Inside Social Media, New York University Skopje, Macedonia; IDEA:Exchange, Goldsmiths, University of London, UK; Munich Science Days, FOM University of Applied Sciences, Munich, Germany; Digital Marketing Congress, University of Hamburg, Germany).

Hellriegel is also a partner in a business consulting company, specializing in digital transformation. In his role as professor and consultant, he is a frequent member of a delegation to the Federal Ministry for Economic Affairs and Energy in Germany.

== Bibliography ==
- Hellriegel, Oliver T.; Kolo, Castulus (2022). CEO Communication in Social Media: Application of the ABC Social Media Impact Analysis and a New Communication Typology of Company Leaders (Technical report). macromedia University of Applied Sciences. doi:10.6084/m9.figshare.24212832. sr-2022-01.
- Hellriegel, Oliver T.; Kolo, Castulus (2020). CEO Communication in Social Media: Derivation and Pilot Application of a Methodology Based on "Audience", "Buzz", and "Commitment" ("Social Media ABC Analysis") (Technical report). macromedia University of Applied Sciences. doi:10.6084/m9.figshare.12164313. sr-2020-01.
- Coskun, Anil; Hellriegel, Oliver T. (August 18–20, 2020). "The Potential of Voice Commerce: Attitudes and Behaviors in Ordering via Voice Assistant" (PDF). 2020 AMA Summer Academic Conference: Bridging Gaps Marketing in an Age of Disruption. Vol. 31. San Francisco, CA, USA: American Marketing Association. pp. 162–165. ISBN 978-0-87757-008-0.
- Hellriegel, Oliver T.; Panknin, Sabrina (2010). "Social Media in Bezug zu anderen Medien und heutigem Kommunikationsverhalten". Social Media Kompass 2010/2011 (in German). BVDW. pp. 12–15. ISBN 978-3-94226-208-8.
