= Oliver Massmann =

German lawyer (born 1966)

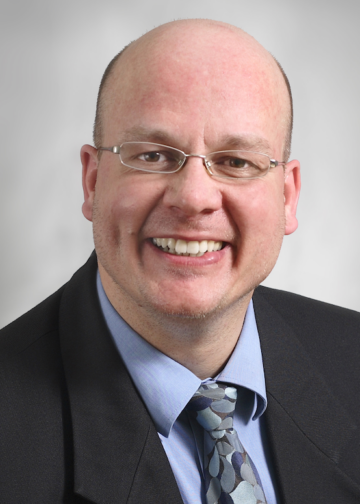
- Born: 1966 (age 59–60); Germany
- Education: Bochum Law University; St. Thomas University, Florida
- Occupation: Lawyer

Oliver Massmann (born 1966), son of Prof. Dietmar Willhelm Massmann, is a German lawyer who is a partner at Duane Morris LLP and general director at Duane Morris LLC Vietnam.

From 2021 to 2023, the European Commission in Brussels and the EU Delegation in Hanoi designated Massmann as the lead advisor for the enactment of the EU-Vietnam Free Trade Agreement (EVFTA).

== Early life and education ==
Born in 1966 in Germany, Massmann was raised in Oberhausen. He obtained his first state exam in 1994 along with his law degree from Bochum Law University. In 1997, he obtained the second state exam from the Ministry of Justice, Düsseldorf, Germany. He earned his LLM in international taxation from St. Thomas University, Florida, and received certification as an International Financial Accountant and Auditor from the College of Birmingham. He also holds a PhD in international business law.

Massmann acquired Vietnamese language skills when he was a student through a language program designed by a former South Vietnamese general. In 1999, he relocated to Vietnam permanently, furthering his studies in the language at the University of Hanoi. He is now fluent in Vietnamese.

Massmann is married and has two children.

== Career ==
Massmann came to Vietnam for the first time in 1991 and began his legal career in 1999 with an American law firm, Baker & McKenzie, in Vietnam. He served as an associate and later as a partner until 2007.

In 2007, Massmann joined another American law firm, Duane Morris LLP in Vietnam, as a partner. He also holds the position of general director for Duane Morris LLC in Vietnam.

Massmann has been active in Vietnam's commercial law sector for over twenty years. "He wrote Vietnam's commercial code and is a member of the Vietnamese bar. His specializations include foreign direct investment, international corporate taxation, energy projects, telecommunications, and M&A.

Massmann has advised the Vietnamese government on WTO negotiations and contributed to U.S. bilateral trade agreements. He collaborates with Myanmar's Ministry of Electrical Power and is affiliated with the Vietnam International Arbitration Centre (VIAC). In 2016, he addressed Vietnam's National Assembly in Vietnamese.

From 2021 to 2023, the European Commission in Brussels and the EU Delegation in Hanoi designated Massmann as the lead advisor for the enactment of the EU-Vietnam Free Trade Agreement (EVFTA). He has played a significant role in aligning Vietnamese laws with the stipulations of the EVFTA.

Massmann also serves on the board of the German Business Association.
