= Oliver Fortuin =

South African businessman and corporate executive

- Born: South Africa
- Education: Open University
- Occupations: Businessman, Executive Coach & Corporate Executive
- Years active: 2001 — present

Oliver Fortuin is a South African businessman and corporate executive who served as the Group Chief Executive Officer of SEACOM, from January 2021 to March 2023. Before that, he was the group chief enterprise officer at MTN Group.

== Background and education ==
Fortuin is a South African national. He holds a Master of Business Administration, obtained from the Open University, in the United Kingdom.

== Career ==
Fortuin has a business career going back over 20 years. He spent several years in various managerial and executive positions at International Business Machines (IBM), responsible for Sub-Saharan Africa in one position and for the entire African continent in another role.

He also spent three years at BT Global Services, managing their business in Sub-Saharan Africa. He joined MTN Group in 2007, serving there for nearly four years as the Group Chief Enterprise Officer.

At SEACOM, Oliver Fortuin replaced Byron Clatterbuck, who resigned for personal reasons. As Group CEO, Fortuin oversaw the acquisition of 100 percent of Hirani Telecom cable network in Nairobi, Kenya, where Hirani provides last mile connections for SEACOM customers. Also, under his watch, SEACOM acquired the office space and other selected assets in Uganda previously owned by the now defunct Africell Uganda.

== Other considerations ==
Fortuin is a Fellow of the Africa Leadership Initiative–South Africa, being a member of the sixth class. He is also a member of the Aspen Global Leadership Network. In addition, he is a mentor for aspiring business executives in the community where he lives and works.

== See also ==
- Economy of South Africa
- Ralph Mupita
