= Oliver Frank =

German singer (1963–2022)

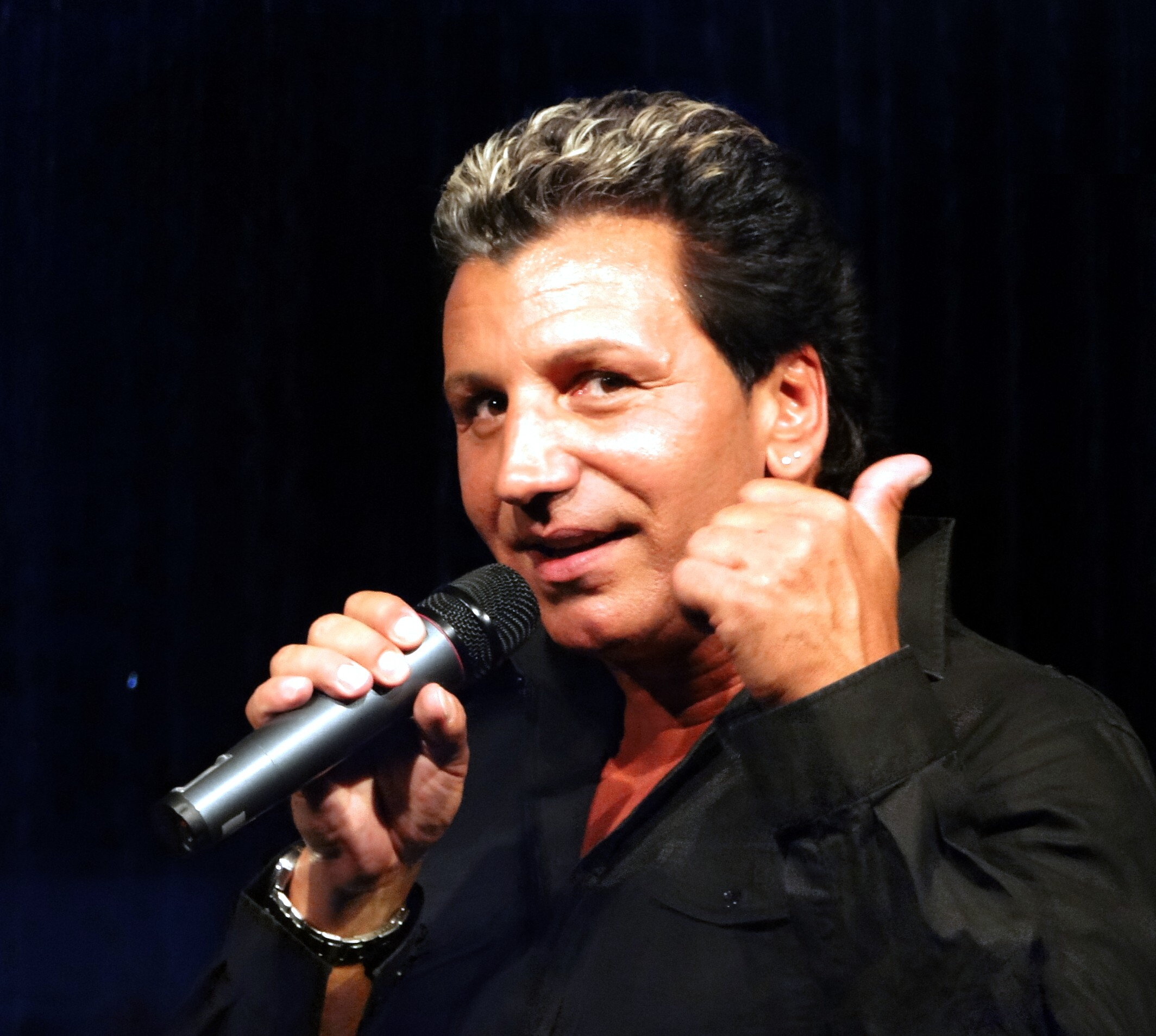
- Born: Oliver Kruck; 1 September 1963; Göttingen, Lower Saxony, West Germany
- Died: 25 February 2022 (aged 58); Göttingen, Lower Saxony, Germany
- Occupation: Schlager singer
- Years active: 1985–2022

Oliver Frank (born Oliver Kruck; 1 September 1963 – 25 February 2022) was a German Schlager singer.

Active from 1985, he became particularly associated with the 1996 song "Italienische Sehnsucht", which marked his breakthrough and became his signature song. His 2005 single "Nichts als die Wahrheit (La verità)" reached number 93 on the German singles charts.

== Life and career ==
Frank was born in Göttingen on 1 September 1963 as Oliver Kruck. He grew up in Augsburg and later lived in Erlangen and Kassel before returning to the Göttingen area. By 2010 he was living in the Nikolausberg neighborhood in Göttingen.

His professional career began in 1985 after he participated in a Schlager competition and was discovered by a talent scout. His first single, "Abschied von Fernando", was released that year. His first album, Santa Barbara, followed in 1990.

During the 1990s Frank increasingly performed music in a style combining German Schlager with themes from Italian popular music. He later described his own style as "German-Italian discofox". Songs from this period included "Samstag Nacht", "Weit, weit von hier" and "Ciao, Bella Italia".

Frank's breakthrough came in 1996 when he performed the song "Italienische Sehnsucht" on the television programme ZDF-Hitparade. Other television appearances during his career included Immer wieder Sonntags, ARD-Wunschbox and ZDF-Fernsehgarten.

In 2005 Frank released "Nichts als die Wahrheit (La verità)". The single entered the German singles charts on 18 July 2005, reaching number 93 and remaining in the chart for one week. It was his only single to enter the official German Top 100.

Frank continued to release Schlager singles, albums and compilations during the following decade. The album Saitenblicke was released in 2015 and included, among others, "Alles nur Fassade", "Briefe von Sarah", "Sommer in San Marino", "Drama Queen" and "Die Frau für's Leben".

In 2019 Frank appeared as one of the singers seeking a partner in the RTL reality dating programme Schlager sucht Liebe, presented by Beatrice Egli. Later that year he released the album Herz oder gar nichts.

Frank died in Göttingen on 25 February 2022 at the age of 58, following what his management described as a short and serious illness.

== Discography ==
=== Selected singles ===
- "Abschied von Fernando" (1985)
- "Im Hafen von Piräus" (1985)
- "Palermo bei Nacht" (1986)
- "Santa Barbara" (1988)
- "Rendezvous im Paradies" (1989)
- "Liza Maria" (1990)
- "Es ist wieder Sommer in der Stadt" (1992)
- "Samstag Nacht" (1995)
- "Weit, weit von hier" (1995)
- "Italienische Sehnsucht" (1996)
- "Ich bin wieder frei" (1998)
- "Schwerelos" (2001)
- "7 Wochen (Italienische Sehnsucht, Part 2)" (2001)
- "Nichts als die Wahrheit (La verità)" (2005)
- "Nur ein Spiel (Solamente un gioco)" (2006)
- "Amore per sempre – Jetzt oder nie" (2008)
- "Unser Sommer der Liebe" (2009)
- "Wir war'n mehr" (2011)
- "Alles nur Fassade" (2013)
- "Briefe von Sarah" (2014)
- "Sommer in San Marino" (2014)
- "Drama Queen" (2015)
- "Die Frau für's Leben" (2015)
- "Herz gefunden" (2016)
- "A domani (Bis morgen, mein Leben!)" (2018)
- "Herz oder gar nichts" (2019)
- "Was geht hier ab?" (2019)
- "Angezählt" (2020)

=== Albums and compilations ===
- Santa Barbara (1990)
- Samstag Nacht (1993)
- Rendez-vous im Paradies (1994)
- Alles klar! (1996)
- Alles klar! – Die 2te (1997)
- Alles klar! – Die Maxis (1998)
- Das Beste von Oliver Frank (1998)
- Knall auf Fall (1999)
- Hautnah (2001)
- Italienische Sehnsucht – Die Fanedition! (2002)
- XXL – Die Remixe (2002)
- Land in Sicht (2003)
- Best of – Die Italo-Sommer-Edition (2004)
- Küsse und mehr (2007)
- Mega-Mix (2007)
- Gold-Collection (2007)
- Unverbesserlich (2009)
- Ich wette auf Dich und mich – Das Beste aus 25 Jahren Oliver Frank! (2010)
- Jetzt oder nie (2011)
- Saitenblicke (2015)
- My Star – Oliver Frank (2017)
- Herz oder gar nichts (2019)
- Lieblingsschlager (2019)

== Awards ==
- 1994 – voted most popular Schlager singer by readers of the Westdeutsche Allgemeine Zeitung.
- 2005 – named "artist of the year" in the Partyschlager category by the Deutsches Künstlermagazin.
