= Oliver Beer =

Oliver Beer may refer to:

- Oliver Beer (footballer) (born 1979), German football coach
- Oliver Beer (artist) (born 1985), British artist

== See also ==
- Olivier Beer (born 1990), Swiss cyclist
