= Oliver Butterworth =

Oliver Butterworth may refer to:

- Oliver Butterworth (writer), American children's author and educator
- Oliver Butterworth (violinist), British violinist, music educator, and arts administrator
