= Oliver Poole (journalist) =

British journalist and author

- Born: 30 May 1972
- Education: Eton College; St. Anne's College, Oxford
- Occupation: Journalist
- Relatives: Oliver Poole, 1st Baron Poole, (paternal grandfather), Norman Fowler, (stepfather)

Oliver Poole is a British journalist and author who has had articles published by The Independent, The Guardian, BBC News and The Observer. He has also published two books detailing his experiences of the war in Iraq; Black Knights: On the Bloody Road to Baghdad and Red Zone: Five Bloody Years in Baghdad. In Black Knights, Oliver details his experiences embedded in a US tank corps known as the Black Knights as they spearheaded the push into Baghdad in spring 2003. Following on from this experience, Red Zone provides an account of daily life for Iraqis, as well as the British and American soldiers sent to Iraq. It is also the story of Ahmed Ali, tourist guide turned Telegraph interpreter, a job that made him an insurgent target.

== Articles ==
- 'Oliver Poole: What the war taught me' The Independent 16 March 2008
