= Oliver Kosturanov =

Oliver Kosturanov (1968–2014) was a Macedonian businessman, president of the board of directors of Makedonski Telekom, and SEAF's Director General for Macedonia.

== Personal life ==
Kosturanov was born in Skopje, Republic of Macedonia. Besides his native Macedonian language, Kosturanov is fluent in English and the Slavic languages spoken in the Balkans.

== Professional career ==
- 2010– Makedonski Telekom AD Skopje, President of board of directors
- 2010– T-Mobile Makedonija AD Skopje, Chairman of the Assembly of Sahreholders
- 2009– SEAF, Director General for Macedonia
- 2007– SIF (Small Investment Fund), Director General
- 2006– Macedonian Bank for Development Promotion, President of the Supervisory Board
- 2004– SPMG, managing director
- 1999–2004, SEAF Macedonia, Senior Investment Officer
- 1997–99, Macedonian Banking Operations Center (MBOC), Senior Banking Advisor
- 1994–97, TTK Banka AD Skopje, Head of the Treasury department

== Publications ==
- Investment Reform Index for South East Europe 2006, OECD
- SME Policy Index 2009, OECD
- Activities for Small and Medium Enterprises in Macedonia, 2002, NEPA

== Interviews and newspapers publications ==
- Kapital, 2 October 2003
- Kapital, 21 October 2003
- Kapital, 27 November 2003
- Kapital, 11 December 2003
- Kapital, 19 January 2004
- Vreme, 10 September 2007

== Awards ==
- University of Sheffield, alumnus of the month, January 2011
