= Oliver Sutton =

Oliver Sutton may refer to:

- Oliver Sutton (bishop) (died 1299), medieval Bishop of Lincoln, England
- Oliver Sutton (RAF officer) (1896–1921), British World War I flying ace
- Sir Oliver Graham Sutton (1903–1977), British mathematician and meteorologist
