= Oliver Peterson =

American artist (born 1976)

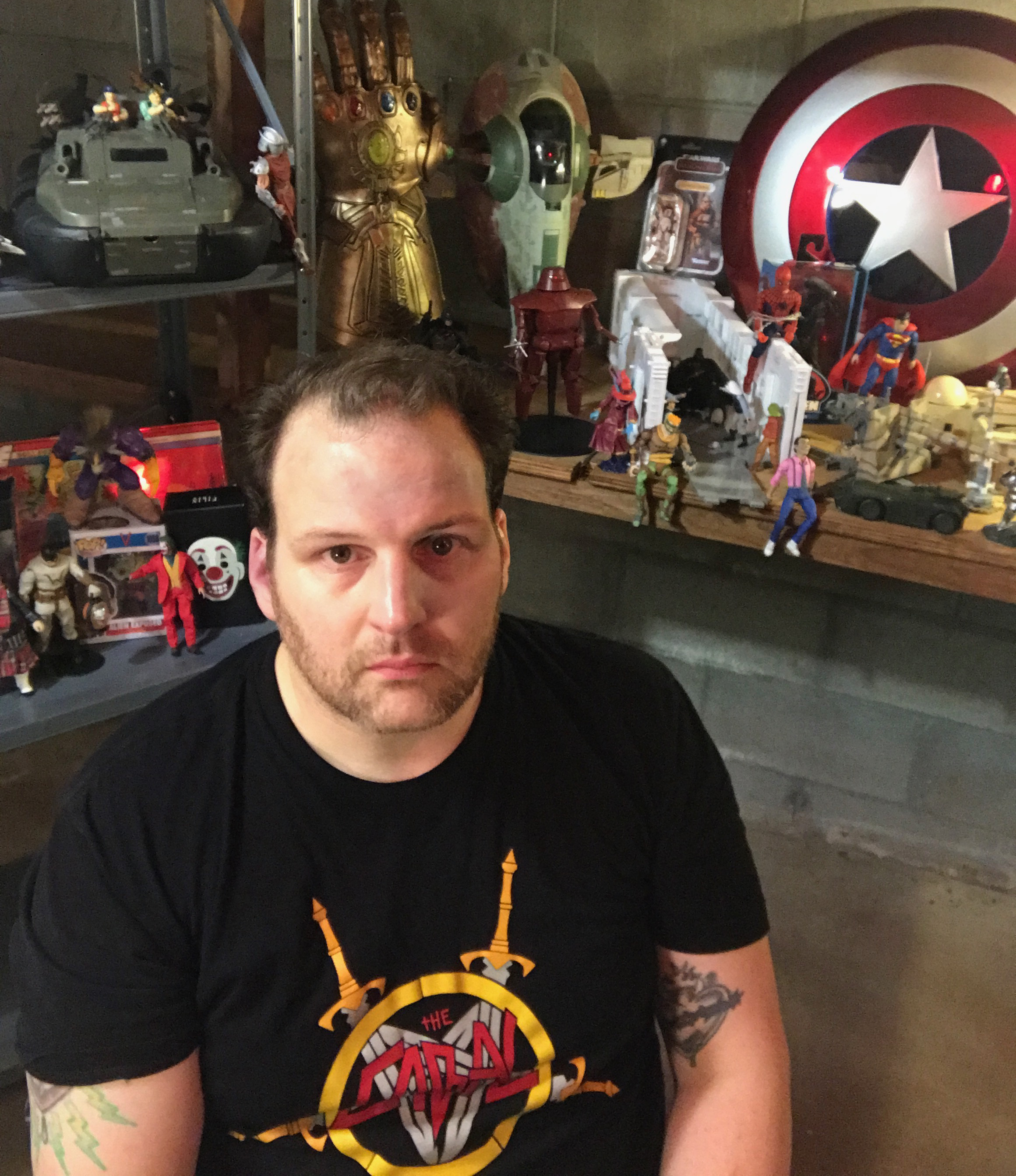
- Artist and toy photographer Oliver Peterson (aka @oliversees)
- Born: Oliver Weymouth Peterson; September 14, 1976 (age 49); New York City, USA
- Education: School of Visual Arts, BFA; Southampton College, MFA
- Occupation: Artist
- Years active: 1999–present
- Website: https://olliep.deviantart.com

Oliver Peterson (born September 14, 1976) is an American artist based in the Hamptons, Long Island, New York, US.

== Art ==
Peterson is a multimedia and collage artist whose work has been displayed at Southampton Arts Center in Southampton Village, New York, with the art collective Fresh Art Long Island; at Ashawagh Hall in Springs, New York; and Elisa Contemporary in Riverdale, New York, among many more galleries.

In 2014, Peterson began practicing toy photography, the art of arranging and photographing action figures and other toys using dioramas or real-world landscapes as backgrounds, creating the illusion that the toys are life-size. He joined the burgeoning community of toy photographers on Instagram using the handle @oliversees. In 2016, toy company Hasbro chose one of Peterson's photographs of Star Wars figures to display at San Diego Comic-Con. Peterson creates his own dioramas and makes his own props, and says, "I look at the world from 6-inch standpoint and make it work."
