= Oliver Ross =

Oliver Ross may refer to:

- Oliver Ross (footballer) (born 2004), Danish footballer
- Oliver Ross (offensive lineman) (born 1974), American football player
- Oliver Ross (running back) (born 1949), American football player
