= Oliver Williams =

Oliver Williams may refer to:

- Oliver Williams (cricketer) (born 1983)
- Oliver Williams (American football) (born 1960)
