= Oliver Newman =

Oliver Newman may refer to:

- Oliver Peck Newman (1877–1956), president of the Board of Commissioners of the District of Columbia
- Oliver Michael Griffiths Newman (born 1941), Australian metallurgist, administrator and amateur ornithologist
