= Oliver Schmidt =

Oliver Schmidt may refer to:

- Oliver Schmidt (footballer) (born 1973), German footballer
- Oliver Schmidt (engineer) (born 1969), German engineer
