= Oliver Roth =

Oliver Roth may refer to:

- Oliver Roth (badminton) (born 1986)
- Oliver Roth (footballer) (born 1968)
