= Oliver Byerly =

American politician

Member of the Washington House of Representatives for the 24th district
- In office 1905–1913

Personal details
- Born: April 20, 1840 Westmoreland County, Pennsylvania, United States
- Died: January 6, 1929 (aged 88) Longview, Washington, United States
- Party: Republican

Oliver L. Byerly (April 20, 1840 – January 6, 1929) was an American politician in the state of Washington. He served in the Washington House of Representatives.
