= Oliver Walker (disambiguation) =

Oliver Walker (born 1985) is a British actor.

Oliver Walker may also refer to:

- Oliver Ormerod Walker (1833–1914), British politician
- Oliver Walker (journalist) (1906–1965), South African journalist
- Henry Oliver Walker (1843–1929), American painter
