= Oliver St Clair =

Oliver St Clair or Sinclair may refer to:

- Oliver St Clair, 12th Baron of Roslin (died 1523), Scottish noble
- Sir Oliver St Clair de Pitcairnis or Oliver Sinclair (died circa 1576), favourite courtier of James V of Scotland
- Olave Sinclair (died 1573), Scottish official in Orkney and Shetland
- Oliver Sinclair, character in Strike Back: Project Dawn
