= Oliver Fox =

Oliver Fox may refer to:

- Oliver Fox (writer) (1885–1949)
- Oliver Fox (rugby union) (born 1999)
