= Oliver J. Coleman =

American politician

Member of the Florida House of Representatives from the Madison County district
- In office 1871–1872

Personal details
- Born: c. 1844
- Died: May 29, 1926 (aged 81–82)

Oliver J. Coleman (c. 1844 – May 29, 1926) was a state legislator representing Madison County, Florida, during the Reconstruction era. In 1873 he was elected in a special election to represent the 10th Senatorial District.

He served in the Florida House of Representatives in 1871 and 1872 and won a special election to represent the 10th District in the Florida Senate in December 1873.
