= Oliver Harvey =

Oliver Harvey may refer to:

- Oliver Harvey, 1st Baron Harvey of Tasburgh (1893–1968), British civil servant and diplomat
- Oliver Harvey (footballer) (born 1993), Bermudian football player
- Oliver Harvey (labor organizer) (1909–?), African American janitor and labor organizer
