= Oliver Chinganya =

Zambian Chartered statistician

- Born: Livingstone, Zambia
- Education: University of Dar es Salaam; University of Southampton; Jomo Kenyatta University of Agriculture and Technology
- Scientific career
- Fields: Statistics
- Workplaces: Royal Statistical Society; United Nations Economic Commission for Africa

Oliver John Munakoozuma Chinganya is a Zambian chartered statistician (since 1999), chartered Scientist of the Science Council (UK), a fellow of the Royal Statistical Society and an Elected Member of the International Statistical Institute (ISI), with over 35 years of experience in statistical development in Africa at national, regional and international levels, more than 25 of those in public and international organizations. His career spans the design and management of substantial financial resources, capacity building and strategic systems leadership. He has strong analytical, intellectual, interpersonal and leadership skills with proven success in multicultural environments and in building effective partnerships across Africa and globally. He believes in coordinated, partnership-based approaches as the foundation for sustainable development outcomes.

He was the director of African Centre for Statistics at UN Economic Commission for Africa (UNECA). between 2016 - 2025, and also served as the Vice President of the International Statistical Institute. Currently, he is the chair person of the Zambia Statistical Agency Board, co-chair of the Digital Earth Africa and senior advisor (Data & AI) at the International Growth Centre, London School of Economics. He will be the President-Elect of International Statistical Institute between 2027 - 2029 and the President between 2029 - 2031.

== Education ==
He was born in Livingstone, Zambia. After graduating from secondary school, he joined the Zambian Statistics Agency. In 1984, he enrolled in a training program sponsored by the UN Population Fund. He earned the equivalent of a bachelor's degree from the Eastern Africa Statistical Training Centre at the University of Dar es Salaam. He earned an M.Sc in Statistics from Southampton University in 1991, and later an MBA in Strategic Management from Jomo Kenyatta University of Agriculture and Technology in 2008.

== Career ==
His career involved in the field of statistics and statistical development in Africa. He served as UNECA's Officer in Charge for the Climate Change, Environment and Natural Resources Management Division, and also set up the Digital Centre of Excellence.

Currently, Chinganya serves as the director of the African Centre for Statistics at the UN Economic Commission for Africa.

Chinganya emphasized the importance of integrated civil registration and ID management and also highlighted the significance of civil registration as the foundation for collecting data from birth to death.

In 2020, he bemoaned the negative impact of the COVID-19 pandemic on civil registration and vital statistics systems, particularly in Africa, leading to the absence of vital data.

== Selected publications ==
- Chinganya, Oliver; Adam, Abdoulaye; Kouakou, Marc (31 March 2017). "Comparative analysis of costs of some selected infrastructure components across Africa". Infrastructure in Africa: 569–582. doi:10.46692/9781447326656.015. ISBN 9781447326656.
- Chikamata, Davy M.; Chinganya, Oliver; Jones, Heidi; RamaRao, Saumya (June 2002). "Dual Needs: Contraceptive and Sexually Transmitted Infection Protection in Lusaka, Zambia". International Family Planning Perspectives. 28 (2): 96. doi:10.2307/3088241. JSTOR 3088241.
- MacKeith, N; Chinganya, OJ; Ahmed, Y; Murray, SF (April 2003). "Zambian women's experiences of urban maternity care: results from a community survey in Lusaka". African Journal of Reproductive Health. 7 (1): 92–102. doi:10.2307/3583349. hdl:1807/2589. JSTOR 3583349. PMID 12828141.
- Setel, P; AbouZahr, C; Atuheire, EB; Bratschi, M; Cercone, E; Chinganya, O; Clapham, B; Clark, SJ; Congdon, C; de Savigny, D; Karpati, A; Nichols, E; Jakob, R; Mwanza, J; Muhwava, W; Nahmias, P; Ortiz, EM; Tshangela, A (1 June 2020). "Mortality surveillance during the COVID-19 pandemic". Bulletin of the World Health Organization. 98 (6): 374. doi:10.2471/BLT.20.263194. PMC 7265935. PMID 32514207.
- Chinganya, Oliver (25 December 2020). "Special Issue: Official statistics in Africa". Statistical Journal of the IAOS. 36: 3–5. doi:10.3233/SJI-200767. S2CID 228856186.
