= Oliver Carter =

Oliver Carter may refer to:

- Oli Carter (born 2001), English cricketer
- Oliver Jesse Carter (1911–1976), American judge
- Oliver Carter (priest), Church of England clergyman and divine
- Oro Mensah (born 1995), Swiss professional wrestler formerly wrestled as Oliver Carter
- Ollie Carter, a character from the soap opera EastEnders
