= Oliver Pike =

Oliver Pike may refer to:

- Oliver Pike (cricketer) (born 1998), Welsh cricketer
- Oliver Pike, a minor Buffy the Vampire Slayer character
- Oliver G. Pike (1877–1963), wildlife photographer and film maker
- Oliver Pike, former member of SHVPES.

== See also ==
- Olive Pike (1888–1962), English artist
