= Oliver Barrett =

Oliver Barrett may refer to:

- Oliver Barrett IV, a character in the 1970 film Love Story
- Oliver R. Barrett (1873–1950), American lawyer, author, and collector of Abraham Lincoln artifacts
- Oliver L. Barrett (1892–1943), American sculptor
- Oliver O'Connor Barrett (1908–1989), British sculptor, poet and composer

== See also ==
- Oliver Barrett House, North East, New York, United States
