= Oliver Ulloth =

German politician (born 1983)

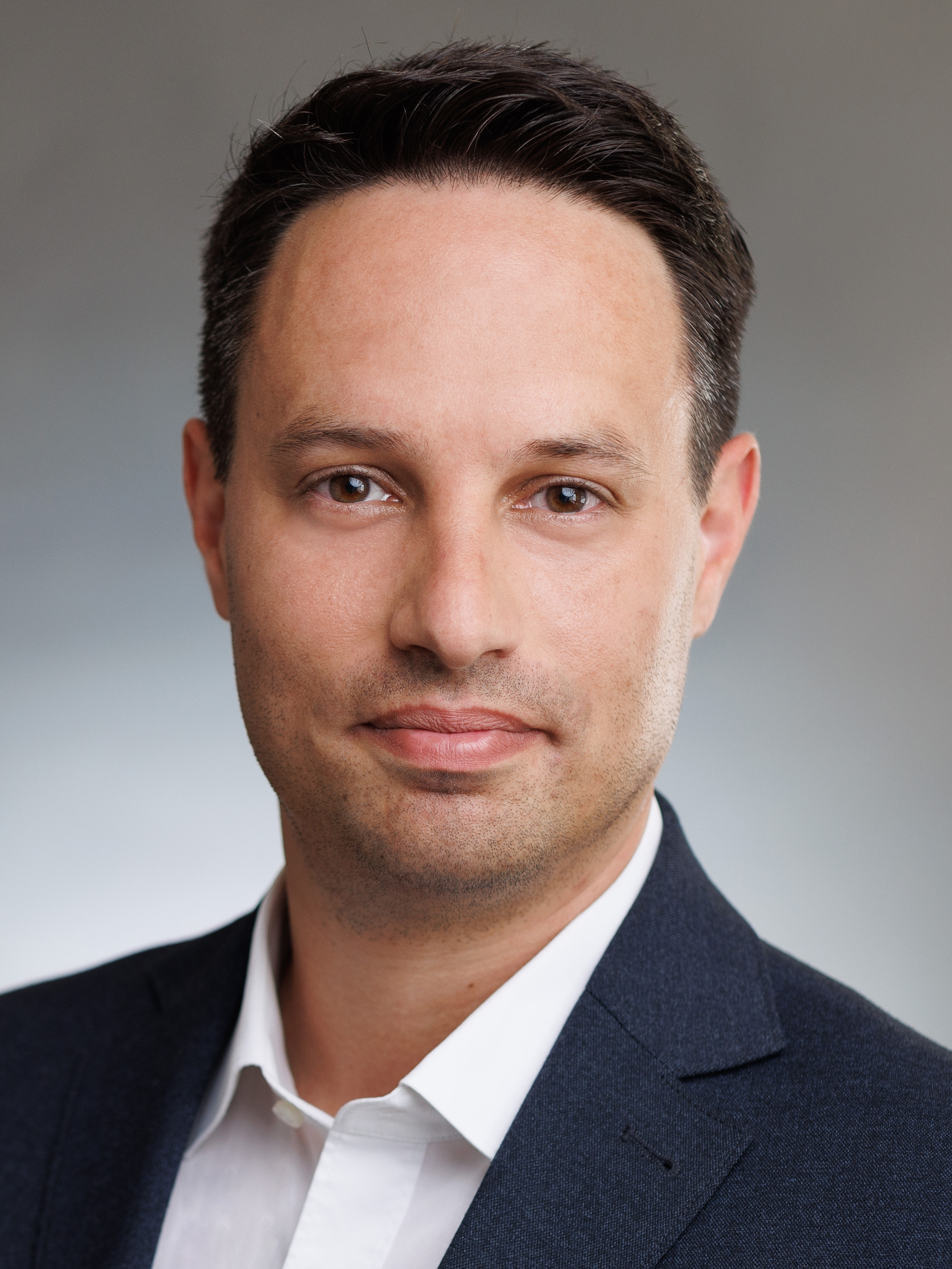
- Ulloth in 2022

Member of the Landtag of Hesse
- Incumbent
- Assumed office 18 January 2019
- Preceded by: Brigitte Hofmeyer
- Constituency: Kassel-Land I

Personal details
- Born: 1 December 1983 (age 42)
- Party: Social Democratic Party (since 2005)

Oliver Ulloth (born 1 December 1983) is a German politician serving as a member of the Landtag of Hesse since 2019. He has served as chairman of the Petitions Committee since 2024.
