= Oliver Phelps =

Oliver Phelps may refer to:

- Oliver Phelps (actor) (born 1986), English actor
- Oliver Phelps (politician) (1749–1809), American politician
