= Oliver Powell =

Oliver Powell may refer to:

- Oliver S. Powell (banker) (1896–1963)
- Oliver S. Powell (politician) (1830–1888)
