= Oliver St John (disambiguation) =

Oliver St John (c. 1598–1673) was an English statesman and judge.

Oliver St John may also refer to:

- Oliver St John, 1st Baron St John of Bletso (1522–1582), English peer
- Oliver St John, 3rd Baron St John of Bletso (1540–1618), English politician
- Oliver St John, 1st Viscount Grandison (1559–1630), English soldier and Lord Deputy of Ireland
- Oliver St John, 1st Earl of Bolingbroke (c. 1580–1646), English nobleman and politician
- Oliver St John, 5th Baron St John of Bletso (1603–1642), his son, English politician
- Oliver St John (civil servant) (1837–1891), administrator in British India
- Oliver St John, Viscount Kirkwall (born 1969), member of the Scottish aristocracy
- Oliver St John, 2nd Earl of Bolingbroke (before 1634–1688), British peer and landowner

== See also ==
- Peter St John, 9th Earl of Orkney (born Oliver Peter St John, 1938), Canadian academic and Scottish peer
