= Oliver White =

Oliver White may refer to:

- Oliver White (cricketer) (1880–1956), English cricketer
- Oliver White (soccer) (born 1994), American soccer player

== See also ==
- Oliver White Tavern, a historic former tavern in Bolton, Connecticut
