= Oliver Zahn =

German-American Scientist and Entrepreneur

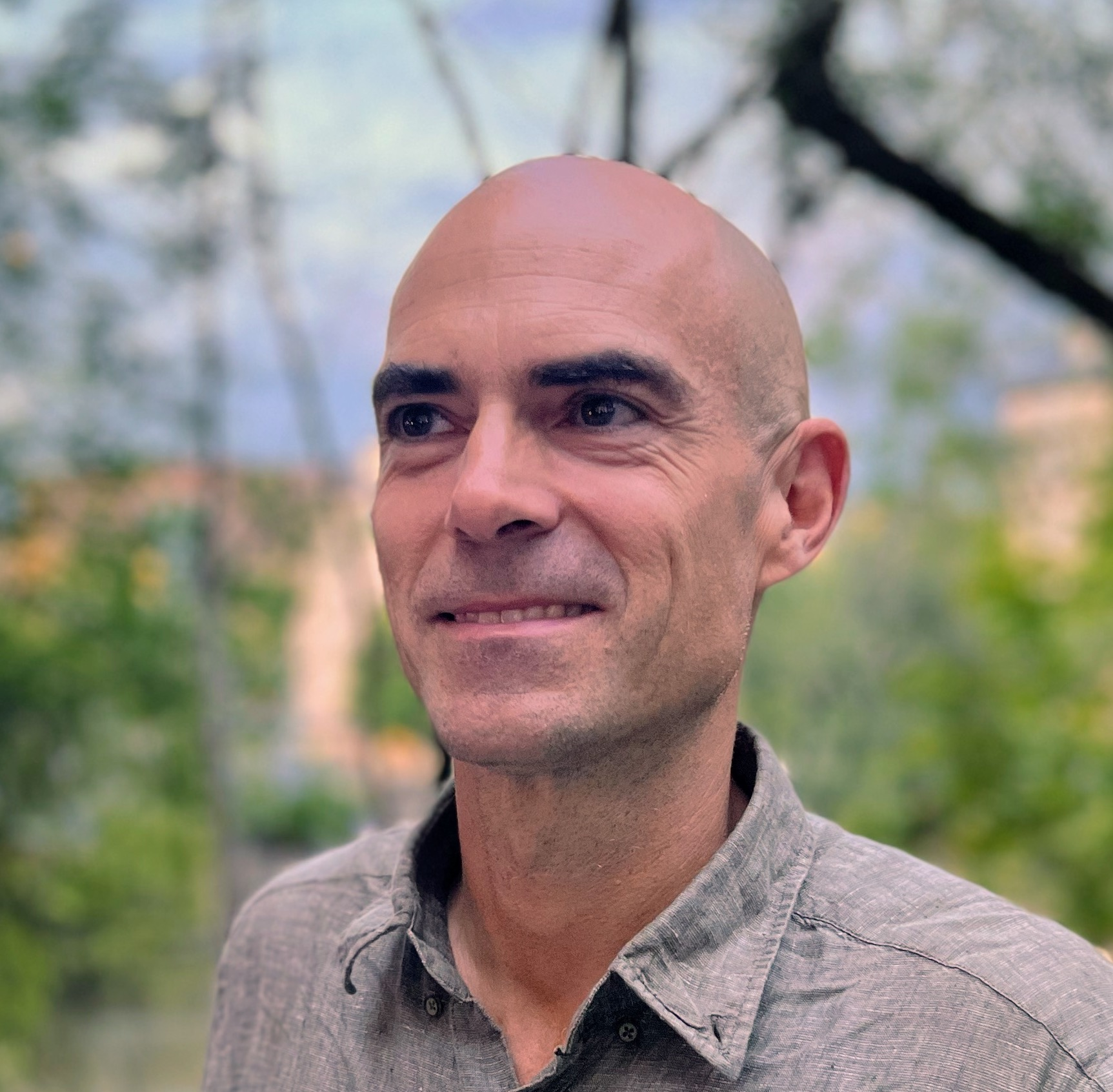
- Education: LMU Munich (Diploma in Physics, 2003); Harvard-Smithsonian Center for Astrophysics and Heidelberg University (Ph.D., 2007)
- Occupation: Scientist Physics Data Scientist
- Website: www.climaxfoods.com

Oliver Zahn is US/German theoretical astrophysicist, data scientist, and entrepreneur, best known for developing algorithms for astrophysical data analysis and widely cited discoveries of phenomena in the history of the Universe. He is also known for his more recent work as founder and CEO of Climax Foods, a California-based biotechnology company modeling dairy and other animal products directly from plant ingredients. Prior to becoming an entrepreneur, Zahn directed UC Berkeley's Center for Cosmological Physics alongside George Smoot and Saul Perlmutter and was Head of Data Science at Google

== Early life and education ==
Zahn was born in Munich and studied physics and philosophy at LMU Munich, doing his Diploma thesis in theoretical astrophysics jointly at Max Planck Institute for Astrophysics and New York University, graduating summa cum laude. He went on to do his dissertation work in cosmology at Harvard University, before winning the inaugural prize fellowship at UC Berkeley's Center for Cosmological Physics, funded directly by the 2006 Nobel Prize in Physics.

== Career ==
=== Industry career ===
In 2019, Oliver founded Climax Foods to replace animal foods with dairy and meat directly produced from plants, circumventing the animals' complex metabolisms and thereby reducing greenhouse gases and water use caused by animal agriculture. Climax aims to outcompete animal products by offering zero-compromise alternatives that are purely plant-based, yet indistinguishable in terms of taste and texture, and better than their animal-based competitors in terms of nutrition and price.

=== Academic career ===
Zahn has worked on a broad range of topics in theoretical, computational, and observational astrophysics and cosmology. Working with multiple multinational collaborations, he has co-authored more than 100 peer-reviewed journal articles with more than 14,000 citations and a h-index of 68.

As an undergraduate at Max Planck Institute for Astrophysics, Zahn studied the early Universe and constrained deviations from the laws of gravity and electro-magnetism during the Big Bang.

While a doctoral student at Harvard University, Zahn and co-authors Smith and Dore detected, for the first time, gravitational lensing in the cosmic microwave background. The finding has since been confirmed by teams analyzing data from the Planck, Polarbear, and SPT telescopes

In a separate series of papers Zahn introduced statistical measures to use redshifted 21 cm radiation to study otherwise inaccessible periods of the Universe's structure formation. He invented a novel simulation framework to study galaxy formation in the cosmic web, yielding orders of magnitude performance gains compared to previous ray tracing frameworks, enabling exploration of much larger parameter spaces.

While leading analyses for the University of Chicago and University of California, Berkeley, based South Pole Telescope collaboration, Zahn and his team showed that the first galaxies formed more explosively than previously thought.
