= Oliver Huyshe =

English cricketer (1885–1960)

Personal information
- Full name: Oliver Francis Huyshe
- Born: 26 July 1885; Wimborne Minster, Dorset, England
- Died: 23 August 1960 (aged 75); Exeter, Devon, England
- Batting: Unknown
- Role: Wicket-keeper

Domestic team information
- Years: Team
- 1907: Oxford University
- 1904–1907: Dorset

Career statistics
Competition	First-class
Matches	1
Runs scored	0
Batting average	0.00
100s/50s	–/–
Top score	0
Balls bowled	–
Wickets	–
Bowling average	–
5 wickets in innings	–
10 wickets in match	–
Best bowling	–
Catches/stumpings	–/–
- Source: Cricinfo, 29 October 2011

Oliver Francis Huyshe MC (26 July 1885 – 23 August 1960) was an English cricketer. Huyshe's batting style is not known, but it is known he fielded as a wicket-keeper. The son of the Reverend John Huyshe and Amy Niven, he was born at Wimborne Minster, Dorset where his father was the Vicar and was educated at King's School, Canterbury.

Huyshe made his debut for Dorset in the 1904 Minor Counties Championship against Devon. He played Minor counties cricket for Dorset from 1904 to 1907, making nineteen Minor Counties Championship appearances. While studying at the University of Oxford, Huyshe made a single first-class appearance for Oxford University against the touring South Africans in 1907. He batted once in this match and was dismissed for a duck by Reggie Schwarz.

He later served in World War I, entering the Royal Army Service Corps in June 1916 with the rank of second lieutenant. By May 1918 he was still serving in the Royal Service Corps, this time as an acting captain. He was again mentioned in dispatches as having relinquished the rank of acting captain and reverted to temporary lieutenant. At some point he had also been awarded the Military Cross. He was later the Headmaster of Ravenswood School, Tiverton, Devon, during World War II. He died at Exeter, Devon on 23 August 1960.
