= Oliver Duff Greene =

United States Army Medal of Honor recipient

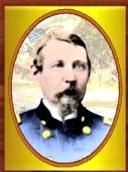
- Born: January 25, 1833; Scott, New York, US
- Died: March 19, 1904 (aged 71); San Francisco, California, US
- Burial place: San Francisco National Cemetery
- Military career
- Allegiance: United States of America
- Branch: United States Army; Union Army
- Service years: 1854 - 1897
- Rank: Colonel; Brevet Brigadier General
- Units: (United States) 2nd Artillery Regiment (United States) VI Corps (United States) Adjutant General's Department
- Awards: Medal of Honor

Oliver Duff (or Davis) Greene (January 25, 1833 – March 19, 1904) was a Union officer who received the Medal of Honor on December 13, 1893, for his action at the Battle of Antietam on September 16, 1862.

Born in Scott, New York, Greene graduated from West Point in 1854, receiving his commission in the artillery. A staff officer for most of his career, he served as Adjutant-General of VI Corps during the Maryland Campaign. A Major at war's end, he was brevetted to brigadier general in March 1865. He received promotions to lieutenant colonel in February 1887, to colonel in July 1892, and retired in January 1897.

Greene was a companion of the California Commandery of the Military Order of the Loyal Legion of the United States.

== Medal of Honor citation ==
"Formed the columns under heavy fire and put them into position."

== See also ==
- List of American Civil War Medal of Honor recipients: G–L
