= Oliver Bauchau =

American aerospace engineer

Olivier Bauchau is an American aerospace engineer who, as of 2020, holds the position of the Igor Sikorsky Distinguished Professor in Rotorcraft at the University of Maryland, College Park, and is a published author. He is a member of several professional organizations, including the American Institute of Aeronautics and Astronautics, American Society of Mechanical Engineers and American Helicopter Society.
