= FC Aalsmeer =

Dutch football club

- Founded: 2014
- Ground: Sportpark Hornmeer
- Coordinates: 52.25488°N 4.77166°E
- Coach: Cor van Garderen
- League: West 1, 1e klasse B
- Website: fcaalsmeer.nl

FC Aalsmeer is an association football club from Aalsmeer, Netherlands. The club was founded on August 1, 2014 through a merger of VV Aalsmeer and RKAV Aalsmeer. The two clubs had already partially merged in 2010 combining their youth football departments as Young Aalsmeer United.

FC Aalsmeer has leading Saturday and Sunday squads and a total of 6 Saturday teams, 6 Sunday teams, 1 women's football team, 1 seniors team, and many youth teams. It plays at Sportpark Hornmeer.

== History ==
The Saturday first squad started in 2014 in the Tweede Klasse, finishing 7th in 2015, and 2nd in 2016. The team qualified for promotion on 17 May 2016 after beating SV Ouderkerk 7–6 in penalties (2–2 in the game plus extension). In the Eerste Klasse it finished 7th, and continued into its second season. The team is coached by Cor van Garderen.

The Sunday first squad started in 2014 in the Vierde Klasse, finishing 7th in 2015, 4th in 2016, and promoting to the Derde Klasse through playoffs. In it ended the first Derde Klasse season in 3rd position and continuous in the same league into in 2017–18 season.
