= Oliver (surname) =

Origin
- Language: English
- Meaning: "Oliver's son"
- Region of origin: England, Wales, Scotland

Oliver is a surname derived from the personal name Oliver. The Scottish Oliver family was a sept of the Scotland Highlands' powerful Clan Fraser of Lovat. There are many different Oliver families in North America.

== People ==
=== A ===
- Adam Oliver (disambiguation)
- Adrian Oliver (born 1988), American basketball player
- Al Oliver (born 1946), American baseball player
- Albert Oliver (born 1978), Spanish basketball player
- Alexandra Oliver (born 1970), Canadian poet
- Alfred Oliver (1882–??), Welsh footballer
- Alison Oliver (born 1997), Irish actress
- Allan Roy Oliver (1936–2021), Canadian politician
- Allen Oliver (1924–2024), English footballer
- Allen J. Oliver (1903–1953), American politician
- Amy Oliver (born 1987), British archer
- Andi Oliver, British chef
- Andrew Oliver (disambiguation)
- Andy Oliver (born 1987), American baseball player
- Anna Oliver (1840–1892), American preacher
- Anthony Oliver (1922–1995), Welsh actor
- Anton Oliver (born 1975), New Zealand rugby league footballer
- Antonio Oliver (1903–1968), Spanish writer
- Archer James Oliver (1774–1842), British painter
- Arnie Oliver (1907–1993), American soccer player
- Arnold Oliver (born 1954), Trinidadian cricketer
- Art Oliver (1911–1944), American boxer
- Arthur Oliver (disambiguation)

=== B ===
- Barret Oliver (born 1973), American actor
- Ben Oliver (disambiguation)
- Bernard M. Oliver (1919–1995), American scientist
- Beryl Oliver (1882–1972), British charity administrator
- Bill Oliver (disambiguation)
- Bob Oliver (1943–2020), American baseball player
- Bobbie Oliver (born 1943), Canadian painter
- Branden Oliver (born 1991), American football player
- Brian Oliver (disambiguation)
- Bronwyn Oliver (1959–2006), Australian sculptor
- Bryce Oliver (born 2000), American football player

=== C ===
- Cameron Oliver (born 1996), American basketball player
- Carl Oliver (born 1969), Bahamian sprinter
- Cary Oliver, Cuban-Puerto Rican actress
- Catriona Oliver (born 1980), Australian rower
- Célestin Oliver (1930–2011), French footballer
- Chad Oliver (1928–1993), American novelist
- Charlane Oliver, American politician
- Charles Oliver (disambiguation)
- Chase Oliver (born 1985), American politician
- C. Herbert Oliver (1925–2021), American activist
- Chip Oliver (born 1944), American football player
- Chris Oliver (disambiguation)
- Christian Oliver (1972–2024), German actor
- Clancy Oliver (born 1947), American football player
- Clare Oliver (1981–2007), Australian activist
- Clarence Paul Oliver (1898–1991), American geneticist
- Clayton Oliver (born 1997), Australian rules footballer
- Codie Elaine Oliver, American television producer
- Collin Oliver (born 2002), American football player
- Concepción Blasco Oliver (1858–1938), Spanish philanthropist
- Conor Oliver (born 1995), Irish rugby union footballer
- Covey T. Oliver (1913–2007), American diplomat
- Craig Oliver (disambiguation)

=== D ===
- Dale Oliver (born 1970), American composer
- Damien Oliver (born 1972), Australian jockey
- Daniel Oliver (disambiguation)
- Darren Oliver (born 1970), American baseball player
- Darren Oliver (footballer) (born 1971), English footballer
- Dave Oliver (born 1951), American baseball coach
- David Oliver (disambiguation)
- Dawn Oliver (born 1942), British legal scholar
- Dean Oliver (disambiguation)
- Deanna Oliver (born 1952), American actress
- Demetrius Oliver (born 1975), American artist
- Dent Oliver (1918–1973), English racing driver
- Derek Oliver (born 1984), Scottish lawn bowler
- Des Oliver (1930–1997), New Zealand rugby union player
- Desmond Oliver (basketball) (born 1969), American basketball coach
- Devin Oliver (born 1992), American basketball player
- Diane Oliver (1943–1966), American activist
- Dick Oliver (1939–2016), American television reporter
- Donald Oliver (1938–2025), Canadian politician
- Donald F. Oliver (1954–2018), American politician
- Don Oliver (1937–1996), New Zealand weightlifter
- Don Oliver (rugby union) (1909–1990), New Zealand rugby union player
- Dougie Oliver (1906–1992), English footballer
- Douglas Oliver (1937–2000), American poet

=== E ===
- Ed Oliver (disambiguation)
- Edward Oliver (disambiguation)
- Edna May Oliver (1883–1942), American actress
- Eileen I. Oliver, American professor
- Emma Oliver (1819–1885), English artist
- Eric Oliver (disambiguation)

=== F ===
- Farquhar Oliver (1904–1989), Canadian politician
- Francesc Tomàs Oliver (1850–1903), Spanish anarchist
- Francis Oliver (disambiguation)
- Francisco Oliver (born 1995), Argentinian footballer
- Francisco Torres Oliver (born 1935), Spanish translator
- Frank Oliver (disambiguation)

=== G ===
- Garrett Oliver (born 1962), American brewer
- Gary Oliver (footballer) (born 1995), Scottish footballer
- Gary Oliver (actor) (born 1966), English actor
- Gavin Oliver (born 1962), English footballer
- Gene Oliver (1913–2007), American baseball player
- Gene Oliver (American football), American football player
- Geoffrey Oliver (1898–1980), British admiral
- George Oliver (disambiguation)
- Georgina Oliver (born 1992), English track and field athlete
- Gillian Oliver (born 1943), British nursing administrator
- Glynis Oliver, Welsh comic book artist
- Gordon Oliver (1910–1995), American film producer
- Grace A. Oliver (1844–1899), American author
- Greg Oliver (born 1971), Canadian sports writer
- Greig Oliver (1964–2023), Scottish rugby union footballer
- Guillermo Oliver (born 1955), Uruguayan-American scientist
- Guy Oliver (1889–1932), American actor

=== H ===
- Harry Oliver (disambiguation)
- Helen Elizabeth Oliver (1896–1934), American singer
- Henry Oliver (disambiguation)
- Hubie Oliver (born 1957), American football player

=== I ===
- Ian Oliver (1940–2022), British police officer
- Ilrey Oliver (1962–2002), Jamaican sprinter
- Ingrid Oliver (born 1977), British actress
- Isaac Oliver (1565–1617) French-English painter
- Isaac Oliver (writer), American author
- Isabel Jolís Oliver (1682–1770), Spanish printer
- Isaiah Oliver (born 1996), American football player

=== J ===
- Jack Oliver (disambiguation)
- Jackie Oliver (born 1942), British auto racing driver
- Jaime Oliver (1927–1998), Spanish boxer
- James Oliver (disambiguation)
- Jamie Oliver, (born 1975), British chef
- Jana Oliver, American author
- Javianne Oliver (born 1994), American sprinter
- Jay Oliver (born 1959), American musician
- Jeff Oliver (born 1965), American football player
- Jennie Harris Oliver (1864–1942), American author
- Jeremy Oliver (born 1961), Australian wine educator
- Jerry Oliver (1930–2020), American basketball coach
- Jerry Oliver (racing driver) (1944–2004), American racing driver
- Jess Oliver (1926–2011), American musician
- Jetti A. Oliver (born 1931), Indian academic administrator
- Jimmy Oliver (disambiguation)
- Joan Miquel Oliver (born 1974), Majorcan musician
- Joe Oliver (disambiguation)
- John Oliver (disambiguation)
- Jonathan Oliver, British writer
- Jordan Oliver (disambiguation)
- Jorge Oliver (born 1981), Puerto Rican swimmer
- José Oliver (born 1954), Puerto Rican archaeologist
- Josefina Oliver (1875–1965), Argentinian photographer
- Joseph Oliver (disambiguation)
- Josh Oliver (born 1997), American football player
- Jovan Oliver (1310–1356), Serbian nobleman
- Juan Oliver (disambiguation)
- Julio Oliver (born 1960), Spanish rower

=== K ===
- Karin Oliver, American singer
- Karl Oliver (born 1963), American politician
- Keith Oliver, British logistician
- Keith Oliver (biathlete) (born 1947), British biathlete
- Kelly Oliver (born 1958), American philosopher
- Kelly Oliver (boxer) (born 1973), English boxer
- Kenneth Oliver (1945–2024), American politician
- Kermit Oliver (born 1943), American painter
- Kim Oliver, British actress
- Kim Oliver (rugby union) (born 1983), English rugby union footballer
- King Oliver (1881–1938), American musician

=== L ===
- Laureen Oliver, American politician
- Lauren Oliver (born 1982), American author
- Lekeaka Oliver (1968–2022), Cameroonian soldier
- Leonard Oliver (disambiguation)
- Lesley Oliver (born 1948), British canoeist
- Lidoro Oliver (1915–?), Argentinian boxer
- Lloyd Oliver (1926–2011), American army officer
- Louis Oliver (born 1966), American football player
- Louis Oliver (poet) (1904–1991), American poet
- Lucy Oliver (born 1988), New Zealand runner
- Luis Miguel Oliver (born 1959), Spanish rower
- Luke Oliver (born 1984), English footballer
- Lunsford E. Oliver (1889–1978), American army officer

=== M ===
- Madge Oliver (1875–1924), British artist
- Maggie Oliver (disambiguation)
- Marcus Oliver (born 1995), American football player
- Margo Oliver (1923–2010), Canadian food editor
- María Rosa Oliver (1898–1977), Argentine writer and activist
- Mariano Puigdollers Oliver (1896–1984), Spanish academic
- Marie Watkins Oliver (1854–1944), American graphic designer
- Marilene Oliver (born 1977), British sculptor
- Martha Oliver (disambiguation)
- Martin Oliver (disambiguation)
- Martyn Oliver (born 1972), English civil servant
- Marvin Oliver (disambiguation)
- Mary Oliver (disambiguation)
- Mayan Oliver (born 1993), Mexican pentathlete
- M. C. Oliver (1886–1958), British calligrapher
- Meg Oliver (born 1970), American news anchor
- Melanie Oliver, New Zealand film editor
- Melvin Oliver (disambiguation)
- Michael Oliver (disambiguation)
- Michel Oliver (born 1932), French chef
- Mickey Oliver, American musician
- Miquita Oliver (born 1984), British television personality
- Montserrat Oliver (born 1966), Mexican fashion model
- Muhammad Oliver (born 1969), American football player

=== N ===
- N. D. T. Oliver (1886–1948), Brazilian cricketer
- Nancy Oliver (born 1955), American playwright and screenwriter
- Narelle Oliver (1960–2016), Australian artist
- Nate Oliver (1940–2025), American baseball player
- Nate Oliver (ice hockey) (born 1980), American ice hockey executive
- Neil Oliver (disambiguation)
- Neville Oliver (born 1944), Australian politician
- Nicole Oliver (born 1970), Canadian actress
- Nick Oliver (born 1991), American ice hockey coach
- Nikkita Oliver, American politician and lawyer
- Noreen Oliver (born 1960), British businesswoman
- Norm Oliver (disambiguation)
- Norman Oliver (rugby league), English rugby league footballer
- Norman Oliver (greyhound trainer) (1927–2012), English greyhound trainer
- Nuria Oliver, Spanish computer scientist

=== P ===
- Pam Oliver (born 1961), American sportscaster
- Pamela E. Oliver, American sociologist
- Paul Oliver (disambiguation)
- Pearleen Oliver (1917–2008), Canadian priest
- Percy Oliver (1919–2011), Australian swimmer
- Percy Lane Oliver (1878–1944), English charity organizer
- Peter Oliver (disambiguation)
- Philip Oliver (disambiguation)
- Pom Oliver (born 1952), British explorer

=== R ===
- Rachel Oliver (disambiguation)
- Ralph A. Oliver (1886–1968), American judge
- Raymond Oliver (1909–1990), French restaurateur
- Reece Oliver, British conservationist
- Reed Oliver (born 1958), Micronesian politician
- Reggie Oliver (disambiguation)
- Reinaldo Oliver (1932–2015), Puerto Rican javelin thrower
- Revilo P. Oliver (1908–1994), American professor
- Richard Oliver (disambiguation)
- Rob Oliver (born 1977), American artist
- Robert Oliver (disambiguation)
- Rochelle Oliver (born 1937), American actress
- Rod Oliver (1922–2005), Australian politician
- Roland Oliver (1923–2014), British historian of Africa
- Roland Oliver (judge) (1882–1967), English judge
- Ron Oliver, Canadian writer
- Russell D. Oliver (1910–1974), American athlete
- Ruth Law Oliver (1887–1970), American aviator
- Ryan Scott Oliver (born 1984), American composer

=== S ===
- S. Addison Oliver (1833–1912), American pioneer
- Sally Oliver (born 1983), English actress
- Samuel Pasfield Oliver (1838–1907), English army officer
- Sara Oliver (born 1996), Canadian curler
- Sean Harris Oliver, Canadian actor
- Shayne Oliver (born 1988), American fashion designer
- Sheila Oliver (1952–2023), American politician
- Simon Oliver, British comic book writer
- Simon Oliver (priest) (born 1971), British priest
- Solomon Oliver Jr. (born 1947), American judge
- Spencer Oliver (disambiguation)
- Stephen Oliver (disambiguation)
- Steve Oliver (born 1962), American musician
- Steven Oliver (footballer) (born 1971), Australian rules footballer
- Stuart Oliver (disambiguation)
- Susan Oliver (1932–1990), American actress
- Sy Oliver (1910–1988), American musician
- Sylvester Oliver (1929–1999), Trinidadian cricketer

=== T ===
- Terry Oliver (born 1963), Australian cricket coach
- Tex Oliver (1899–1988), American football coach
- Toby Oliver, Australian cinematographer
- Tom Oliver (born 1938), Australian actor
- Thomas Oliver (disambiguation)
- Tony Oliver (born 1958), American voice actor
- Tony Oliver (footballer) (born 1967), English footballer
- Tony Oliver (referee) (born 1931), English football referee
- Tracey Oliver (born 1975), Australian Paralympic swimmer
- Tracy Oliver, American film writer
- Travis Oliver, British actor
- Trei Oliver (born 1976), American football coach
- Troy Oliver, American musician
- True Oliver (1881–1957), Canadian sports shooter

=== V ===
- Vadaine Oliver (born 1991), English footballer
- Valerie Cassel Oliver, American curator
- Vaughan Oliver (1957–2019), British graphic designer
- Vaughn Oliver, Canadian record producer and DJ
- Vere Langford Oliver (1861–1942), British surgeon
- Vernon D. Oliver (born 1971), American lawyer
- Vic Oliver (1898–1964), Austrian comedian
- Vince Oliver (1915–1985), American athlete
- Virginia Oliver (1920–2026), American lobster fisherwoman

=== W ===
- Walter Oliver (1883–1957), New Zealander ornithologist
- Walter Tansill Oliver (1873–1932), American politician
- Webster Oliver (1888–1969), American judge
- W. H. Oliver (1925–2015), New Zealand poet-historian
- Willard Varnell Oliver (1921–2009), American soldier
- William Oliver (disambiguation)
- Winslow Oliver (born 1973), American football player

=== X ===
- Xiomara De Oliver (born 1967), Canadian painter

=== Unknown first name ===
- Oliver (Middlesex cricketer) (fl. 1787), English cricketer
- Oliver (Surrey cricketer) (fl. 1824–1828), English cricketer

== Fictional characters ==
- Ariadne Oliver, in the novels of Agatha Christie
- Maxxie Oliver, in the television series Skins
- Reid Oliver, in the television series As the World Turns
- Tommy Oliver, in the live-action series Power Rangers

== See also ==
- Admiral Oliver (disambiguation)
- General Oliver (disambiguation)
- Judge Oliver (disambiguation)
- Senator Oliver (disambiguation)
- Oliver (given name)
- Oliver (disambiguation)
- Olivier (surname)
- Olivier (given name)
- Olivier (disambiguation)
