= Trevor Bayliss =

Australian cricketer and coach

Trevor Bayliss OBE
Personal information
- Full name: Trevor Harley Bayliss
- Born: 21 December 1962 (age 63); Goulburn, New South Wales, Australia
- Batting: Right-handed
- Bowling: Right-arm off spin
- Role: Batsman

Domestic team information
- Years: Team
- 1985/86–1996/97: New South Wales

Head coaching information
- Years: Team
- 2004–2007: New South Wales
- 2007–2011: Sri Lanka
- 2011–2015: Sydney Sixers
- 2012–2014: Kolkata Knight Riders
- 2015–2019: England
- 2020–2021: Sunrisers Hyderabad
- 2021–2026: Sydney Thunder
- 2022–2024: London Spirit
- 2023–2024: Punjab Kings

Career statistics
Competition	First class	List A
Matches	58	50
Runs scored	3,060	1,196
Batting average	35.58	29.90
100s/50s	5/15	1/6
Top score	163	104*
Balls bowled	538	239
Wickets	8	5
Bowling average	26.50	33.60
5 wickets in innings	0	0
10 wickets in match	0	0
Best bowling	4/64	2/13
Catches/stumpings	41/–	15/–
Medal record
Men's Cricket
Representing England as Coach
ICC Cricket World Cup
Winner	2019 England and Wales
Representing Sri Lanka as Coach
ICC Cricket World Cup
Runner-up	2011 India–Bangladesh–Sri Lanka
- Source: Cricinfo, 7 January 2012

Trevor Harley Bayliss OBE (born 21 December 1962) is an Australian cricket coach and former first class cricketer. He played for New South Wales between 1985 and 1997 before becoming a coach.

Bayliss was coach of England from 2015 to 2019. He coached Sri Lanka between 2007 and 2011, a period which culminated in his team finishing as runners-up in the 2011 World Cup. He has also coached the Sydney Sixers in Australia's Big Bash League and the Kolkata Knight Riders in the Indian Premier League. Under his management, the Knight Riders became IPL champions, twice, in 2012 and 2014. He also led the Sixers to a BBL title in the 2011–12 season and a CLT20 title the same year. He has also served as the Head coach for Sunrisers Hyderabad in the Indian Premier League for two seasons- 2020 and 2021. Under his coaching stint, the English Cricket Team won the 2019 Cricket World Cup.

== Playing career ==
Bayliss was born and grew up in the country town of Goulburn, New South Wales, before moving to Sydney to play for the NSW state team. A middle order batsman, he played in 58 first class matches, scoring 3,060 runs at an average of 35.58, and 50 List A limited overs matches. He was NSW's player of the season for 1989–90, scoring 992 runs including two centuries.

== Coaching career ==
=== 2004–2007: New South Wales ===
After the end of his playing career, Bayliss became a development officer for the New South Wales Cricket Association and coached the NSW second XI for a number of years.

He replaced Steve Rixon as NSW coach in 2004–05 and led the state to the Pura Cup final where they defeated Queensland by 1 wicket. Despite their success in the competition, they finished in last place in the 50 over competition.

In the 2005–06 season their defense of the title had them finishing at league bottom although winning three games. However, they did win the ING Cup. After finishing second in the group and winning the final of the competition.

In the 2006–07 season saw improvement as they finished second in the league. However, they lost the final against the Tasmanian Tigers. Their performance in the ING cup worsened as they finished sixth in the competition, winning just three of their ten games.

=== 2007–2011: Sri Lanka ===
==== 2007 ====
Trevor Bayliss succeeded Tom Moody as the coach of the Sri Lankan national team in August 2007. He was selected ahead of Queensland Bulls coach Terry Oliver by a selection committee comprising former Sri Lanka Cricket officials and captains including Aravinda de Silva, Ranjan Madugalle, Michael Tissera, Sidath Wettimuny and Bandula Warnapura.

His first tournament in charge after being appointed was the 2007 T20 World Cup. Sri Lanka won both of their group stage games but were eliminated in the super eight stage of the competition after winning just one of their three matches. Following this Sri Lanka toured Australia for two Test matches series they lost, 2–0. Bayliss won his first series in charge of the team after beating England 1–0 in a three match Test series in Sri Lanka. However, they went on to lose the ODI series 3–2.

==== 2008 ====
In the Commonwealth Bank series with Australia and India, Sri Lanka finished bottom of the group, 2-5 (one game was abandoned). They drew the Test series against the West Indies 1–1 but lost the three match ODI series 2–0. Sri Lanka's one day fortunes improved when they competed in the 2008 Asia Cup. After winning both their group stage games, they qualified for the super eights where they won two matches and won one. They were crowned champions after winning the final. They then beat India 2–1 in a three match Test series but lost the limited overs series 3–2. Sri Lanka won every game of their 5 match ODI series against Zimbabwe. They finished the year with two Test against Bangladesh, with Sri Lanka winning both of them.

==== 2009 ====
In 2009 they beat Pakistan 2–1 in a three match limited overs series and drew the Test series 0–0. He was initially thought to have been injured in an attack on the Sri Lankan team during the tour, however this later turned out to be false. In the 2009 T20 World Cup, they won both of their group games and continued their 100% winning record as they won all three games at the super eights stage of the competition. After winning their semi-final they lost the final to finish as runners-up. In a return series against Pakistan at home they won the Test series 2–0 and the ODI series 3–2. However, they lost the only T20 international between the two teams. They won both Tests against New Zealand at home to win the series 2–0. In the group stage of the Tri-series against New Zealand and India they won one and lost of year group games to qualify for the final, which they went on to lose. They failed to qualify from the Group Stage of the 2009 Champions Trophy, winning one game and losing two. In the tour of India they lost the 3 match Test series 2–0 and the ODI series 3–1. They did however manage to draw the T20 series 1–1.

==== 2010 ====
In 2010 they won three of their four group games in the Tri-series with Bangladesh and India, and then went on to win the final. They won all three of their 2010 Asia Cup group games but lost the final. In a three test home series India, they drew 1–1. In the 2010 Tri-series against New Zealand and India they won two group stage games, losing just one after one game was abandoned. They went on to win the final. They won a three match ODI series against Australia 2–1. They finished the year drawing a three match Test series against West Indies 0–0 but won the ODI series 2–0.

==== 2011 ====
In the 2011 World Cup they qualified from their group after winning four games and losing one. They beat England in the quarter-final and then beat New Zealand in the semi-final to set up a decider against India. However, they lost the match to finish as runners up. Following the tournament, Bayliss left his position as head coach.

=== 2011–2015: Sydney Sixers ===
Following his spell as Sri Lanka coach, he joined the Sydney Sixers as coach for the Big Bash. In the 2011/12 season, Sydney won five of their seven matches to finish third in the league in the regular season. They beat the Hobart Hurricanes in the semi-final stage of the competition to qualify for the final, where they met the Perth Scorchers. Here, they secured a seven wicket victory to be crowned champions of the first Big Bash.

Their victory in the competition saw them qualify for the 2012 Champions league. After winning their group, Sydney qualified for the semi-finals of the competition. After winning the semi-final, they took on South African team Highveld Lions in the final. They won the final by ten wickets to be crowned champions.

Despite this success, Sydney performed poorly in the 2012/13 season of the Big Bash. They finished with just three wins in the league stage of the competition, meaning they did not qualify for the knock out stage of the competition and could not defend their title.

In the 2013/14 season, Sydney finished second in the league after winning six of their eight games, meaning they qualified for the knock out stage of the competition. However, they lost a rain affected semi final and missed out in a place in the final of the competition.

In the 2014/15 season, Sydney finished fourth in the league stage of the competition, qualifying for the knock out stages for the third time in four seasons. They won their semi final against the Melbourne Stars, but lost the final against the Perth Scorchers, meaning they finished the competition as runners up.

=== 2012–2014: Kolkata Knight Riders ===
Following his success with Sydney, he was appointed Kolkata Knight Riders head coach for the 2012 IPL. The team won twelve matches and lost just five to finish in second place in the league stage and qualify for the knock out rounds of the competition. They beat the Delhi Daredevils in the semi-final to set up a final against the defending champions, the Chennai Super Kings, which they won to be crowned champions.

After winning the IPL, Kolkata qualified for the Champions league but were knocked out in the group stage of the competition after winning just one match.

In the 2013 edition of the tournament. Kolkata were unable to qualify for the semi-finals after they lost ten matches, winning only six. The team ended up finishing seventh.

In 2014, Kolkata underwent major changes to their playing staff in a bid to get back to winning ways. They won their final seven games of the league to qualify for the semi-final stage of the competition. They beat Kings XI Punjab to qualify for the final of the competition. In the final they met Kings XI Punjab again and won the game, chasing down a total of 200, to secure their second title in three years.

=== 2015–2019: England ===
On 26 May 2015, Trevor Bayliss was named England cricket team's head coach. He was also reunited with assistant coach Paul Farbrace, who was also the assistant coach during Bayliss' stint as head coach for Sri Lanka.

In 2019 Trevor Bayliss took the England cricket team to win the Cricket World Cup with a Super Over against New Zealand.

==== 2015: Australia ====
Bayliss took charge of England for the first time in the 2015 Ashes series. Going into the series, England were underdogs. Ahead of the first Test, there were no changes to the England squad and the same team was selected that played in the New Zealand Test series. England won the first Test by 169 runs, with Joe Root in particular impressing. In the second Test England named an unchanged team but suffered a heavy defeat by 405 runs after a batting collapse in the second innings. England made two changes for the third Test, with Jonny Bairstow replacing the out of form Gary Ballance and Steven Finn replacing the injured Mark Wood. England went on to win the game by eight wickets after dismissing Australia for 136 in their first innings. James Anderson took 6–47 in the Australian first innings, while Steven Finn took 6–79 in their second innings. Ahead of the fourth Test James Anderson was ruled out through injury and replaced by Mark Wood. England bowled Australia out for just 60 in their first innings, with Stuart Broad taking 8–15. After Joe Root scored a century in England's reply, Ben Stokes took six Australian second innings wickets as England won by an innings and 78 runs. With the Ashes already won, England named an unchanged team, with Anderson still injured. Australia made a big total in their first innings, and England were dismissed cheaply in theirs. Although England batted better when following on, Australia won the game by an innings and 48 runs. Despite this, England won the Ashes 3–2 and regained the urn. In the limited overs series, England won the first T20 match between the teams. Joe Root was rested for the ODI series and James Taylor replaced him at three. The ODI series got off to a bad start for England, with them losing the first two games. However, they won the third match by 93 runs and won the fourth by three wickets. England lost the final match of the series and won the series 3–2.

==== 2015: Pakistan ====
Adam Lyth was replaced as opener for the series against Pakistan, with Moeen Ali being moved up the order to replace him. England drew the first game with debutant Adil Rashid helping to almost force a result for England. England lost the next two games of the series, by 178 runs and 127 runs. The decision to move Moeen Ali up the order did work out, and England's spinners didn't offer a genuine threat throughout the series. Despite the setback, England continued their progression under Bayliss in limited overs cricket. Despite losing the opening match of the ODI series, they recovered to win it 3–1, winning the last three games by a margin of 95 runs, 6 wickets and 84 runs respectively. While England had modified their approach on the sub continent, they still played an aggressive brand of cricket, scoring 355 in the final game of the series. With the T20 World Cup approaching, England experimented in their selections for the three T20 internationals. Sam Billings and James Vince both came into the team and impressed, with Vince being named man of the series, while Chris Jordan returned to the team and demonstrated his credentials as a death bowler, bowling the Super Over in the final game of the series to help England win it 3–0, and make it six victories on the bounce.

==== 2015–16: South Africa ====
England again changed opener for their series against South Africa, with Alex Hales opening and Moeen Ali moving back down the order. Nick Compton also returned to the team. England won the first game by 241 runs, after passing 300 in both innings, before a fit again Steven Finn helped bowl South Africa out for 174 in their second innings. After a high scoring second match, in which Ben Stokes and Jonny Bairstow both hit centuries, England won the third game of the series thanks to a superb bowling display from Stuart Broad. The victory gave England an unassailable 2–0 series lead with one game left to play. England lost the final game of the series after a batting collapse in the second innings, which meant that Bayliss had lost all three of the final game in the Test series he had taken charge of. Despite winning the first two ODIs in convincing fashion, England lost the final three games of the series to lose the ODI series 3–2. However, Alex Hales' form with the bat was a major positive for England as was the emergence of Reece Topley in the bowling unit. England lost both of the T20 games they played to mean they ended the tour with five straight defeats. They were thrashed by nine wickets in the final game of the series, and their last game before the T20 World Cup, with England's seam bowlers being unable to cope with AB de Villiers, Quintin de Kock or Hashim Amla.

==== 2016: T20 World Cup ====
This was the first major tournament he had led England into. They lost the first game against the West Indies, and looked to be heading for defeat against South Africa, but Jason Roy and Joe Root ensured they chased down 230 for victory. It looked like a collapse would be on the cards against Afghanistan, but Moeen Ali and David Willey lead the recovery to help England to a 15 run victory. After beating Sri Lanka, England qualified for the semi-finals against New Zealand. Good death bowling from David Willey and Chris Jordan saw England restrict their opponents to 153–8, and they went on to win the match by seven wickets. England lost the final after Ben Stokes was hit for four consecutive sixes, although it was still a big improvement from England and their exciting brand of cricket was generally praised.

==== 2016: Sri Lanka ====
Following their win over South Africa, England went into the series against Sri Lanka on a high. The only change to the Test team was enforced, with James Vince replacing James Taylor, who had retired for health reasons. England won the first Test by an innings and 88 runs, with James Anderson taking ten wickets in the match. England followed this up with another convincing victory, this time winning by 9 wickets after a Moeen Ali century and further impressive bowling performances from James Anderson and Stuart Broad. The final game was rain affected an ended in a draw, with England winning the series 2–0. England continued their attacking brand of cricket in the ODI series, with the first game of the series ending in a tie after both teams scored 286 from their 50 overs. England won the next match by 10 wickets after a record breaking opening stand from Alex Hales and Jason Roy, before the third game finished in a draw due to rain. England won the fourth game by six wickets, with Jason Roy scoring yet another century, before England won the final game of the series after a strong bowling performance, which included four wickets for David Willey, meaning they won the series 3–0. The only T20I between the two teams saw Bayliss hand England debuts to Liam Dawson and Tymal Mills. Dawson was particularly impressive, tasking figures of 3–27, before an unbeaten 73 from Jos Buttler saw England record an eight wicket victory, and meant they had not lost in their nine matches against Bayliss' former team.

==== 2016: Pakistan ====
Going into the Test series against Pakistan, England made no major changes to their Test team, although Jake Ball was given a debut to replace the injured James Anderson, while Gary Ballance was bought back into the team. England lost the first game of the series by 75 runs. However, they performed much better in the next game and secured a convincing 330 run win over the tourists after strong performances from Joe Root and Alistair Cook. A good rear-guard action saw England win the third Test despite being over 100 runs behind after the first innings. England were 2–1 up going into the final Test, but lost the final game of the series after Pakistan scored 542 and then dismissed England for 253 in the second innings, and went on to secure a 10 wicket victory to level the series at 2–2. England missed out on moving to number one in the rankings after losing the game. In the ODI series England again kept a similar squad, and secured comfortable victories over Pakistan in the first two matches. In the third match, England set a world record score of 444/3 thanks to a record high score from Alex Hales and strong contributions from Eoin Morgan, Joe Root and Jos Buttler. England won the fourth ODI but lost the final match of the series, meaning they won the series 4–1. England lost the only T20I between the teams by nine wickets after struggling with both bat and ball.

==== 2016: Bangladesh ====
Several new players were called up to the team for the tour of Bangladesh. Ben Duckett and Haseeb Hameed both received their first call-ups, with Zafar Ansari, Gareth Batty and Adil Rashid also included. Eoin Morgan and Alex Hales both pulled out of the tour due to safety concerns. England started off the tour well, beating the hosts by 21 runs in the first ODI, with Jake Ball taking five wickets on his ODI debut. However, they lost the next game by 34 runs. In the final match of the series, England won by four wickets to seal a 2–1 series win. The first Test match was close, with England narrowly winning by 22 runs, with Ben Stokes impressing for England. In the second match, England built a lead of 24 in the first innings, but a collapse saw them lose the match by 108 runs to mean the series finished 1–1.

==== 2016–17: India ====
England kept the same squad that faced Bangladesh ahead of the Test series against India. England performed well in the first Test, falling four wickets short of winning the game have played well with the bat. Four players, Alistair Cook, Joe Root, Ben Stokes and Moeen Ali scored centuries for England in the match. However, they were beaten soundly by 246 in the second game, despite James Anderson and Stuart Broad chipping in with wickets. Due to the poor form of both Ben Duckett and Gary Balance, Jos Buttler played in the third Test as the only other reserve batsman in the squad. England again struggled, having been dismissed for 283 in the first innings before India scored 417. Haseeb Hameed batted well for England in their second innings, although India chased down their small target to win by eight wickets. Following the game, Hameed was ruled out for the rest of the series through injury along with Zafar Ansari. This resulted in Keaton Jennings and Liam Dawson being called up to the squad. Jennings scored a century on his debut in the next Test, but England's bowlers again struggled, with India scoring 631 to win the match by an innings and 36 runs. In the final Test, England posted 477 in their first innings, but India again dominated with the bat, scoring 759/7. England collapsed on the final day, and India won by an innings and 75 runs to win the series 4–0.

England did not hand out any debuts for the ODI series, as they selected a similar squad to the one that was selected for Bangladesh. They lost the first match by 3 wickets despite scoring 350/7. They lost the second game by 15 runs after India scored 381/6. They won the final match of the series, their first on tour as they secured a five run victory after scoring 321/8, to put an end to six consecutive defeats, although they lost the series 2–1. England changed their bowling line up for the T20I series, bringing in Chris Jordan and Tymal Mills. They won the first match by seven wickets. However, they lost the second match narrowly by five runs. In the final match of the series England collapsed and were bowled out for 127 as India won by 75 to win the series 2–1, meaning England had lost all three series between the teams.

==== 2017: West Indies ====
England toured the West Indies for a three match ODI series. England kept the same squad for the tour as the series against India. They won the first game by 45 runs after making 296–6 before dismissing the West Indies for 251. The second game proved closer, but an impressive partnership between Joe Root and Chris Woakes saw England chase down their target of 226 to win by four wickets. The final game of the series was more convincing for England, with them making a score of 328 following centuries from Joe Root and Alex Hales, before bowling the West Indies out for 142 to win the game by 186 runs and the series 3–0.

==== 2017: South Africa ====
Despite crushing South Africa in the first test at Lord's by 211 runs England suffered a heavy defeat at the hands of the Proteas in the second test at Trent Bridge by 340 Runs. England went on to recover and to defeat South Africa by 239 and 177 runs respectively in the final two test matches to secure the 4 test series 3–1.

== Honours ==
Bayliss was appointed Officer of the Order of the British Empire (OBE) in the 2020 New Year Honours for services to cricket.

Preceded by Tom Moody	Head coach of Sri Lanka; 2007–2011	Succeeded by Geoff Marsh
Preceded by Peter Moores	Head coach of England; 2015-2019	Succeeded by Chris Silverwood
