= William Oliver =

William Oliver may refer to:

== Arts ==
- William Oliver (artist, born 1804) (1804–1853), English landscape painter
- William Oliver (artist, born 1823) (1823–1901), English figurative and genre painter
- William Oliver (songwriter) (1800–1848), Newcastle upon Tyne–born songwriter
- W. H. Oliver (William Hosking Oliver, 1925–2015), New Zealand writer and poet

== Politics ==
- William Oliver (Alberta politician) (1860–1951), mayor of Lethbridge, Alberta, Canada
- William Oliver (Northern Ireland politician) (1912–1973), MP in the Northern Ireland Parliament for Belfast Dock
- William Olyver, 15th-century MP for Gloucester
- William B. Oliver (1867–1948), American congressman
- William M. Oliver (1792–1863), American lawyer and politician
- Bill Oliver (politician), Canadian politician
- William Oliver (MP for City of London) (died 1432/3)

== Other ==
- Sir William Oliver (British Army officer) (1901–1981), British general
- Sir William Oliver (businessman) (1885–1962), Scottish business advisor
- William Oliver (footballer) (1892–?), English footballer
- William Oliver (physician, 1659–1716), English physician.
- William Oliver (physician, 1695–1764), British physician, philanthropist, and inventor of the Bath Oliver biscuit
- William J. Oliver (1774–1827), 19th-century informer and supposed agent provocateur
- William J. Oliver (industrialist) (1867–1925), early 20th century American contractor
- William Pearly Oliver (1912–1989), instrumental in developing organizations to support Black Nova Scotians
- William Silver Oliver (1836–1908), Irish-born Canadian military surgeon
- Bill Oliver (American football) (born 1939), college football coach
