= Bill Oliver =

Bill Oliver may refer to:

- Bill Oliver (American football) (1939–2025), American football player and coach
- Bill Oliver (politician), Canadian politician
- Bill Oliver (snooker player) (born 1948), English snooker player

== See also ==
- William Oliver (disambiguation)
