= Norm Oliver =

Norm or Norman Oliver may refer to:

- Norm Oliver (footballer, born 1885) (1885–1938), Australian rules footballer for Collingwood
- Norm Oliver (footballer, born 1922) (1922–1944), Australian rules footballer for Collingwood
- Norman Oliver (rugby league) (fl. 1965–1970), rugby league player
- Norman Oliver (greyhound trainer) (1927–2012), English greyhound trainer
