= Stuart Oliver =

Stuart Oliver may refer to:

- Stuart Oliver (cricketer) (born 1972), Australian cricketer
- Stuart Oliver (racing driver) (born 1963), British auto racing driver
