= Eric Oliver (disambiguation) =

Eric Oliver (1911–1980) was an English motorcycle racer.

Eric Oliver may also refer to:

- Eric Oliver (footballer) (born 1940), English former amateur footballer
- Eric Oliver (1914–1995), lover of Denton Welch
