= Joseph Olivier =

Joseph Olivier may refer to:

- Joseph Olivier (rugby union) (1874–1901), French rugby union player
- Joseph Olivier (politician), mayor of Longueuil, Quebec; commonly known as Jacques

== See also ==
- Joseph Oliver (disambiguation)
