= Oliver Henry =

Oliver Henry may refer to:

- Oliver Henry, a pen name, along with O. Henry, of American author William Sydney Porter (1862–1910)
- Oliver Henry (USCG) (1921–1987), African-American United States Coast Guard sailor, the first black sailor to transfer from the Mess Steward occupational class
- Oliver Henry (footballer) (born 2002), Australian rules football player
- USCGC Oliver Henry (WPC-1140), a Sentinel-class cutter

== See also ==
- Henry Oliver (disambiguation)
