= Joseph Oliver =

Joseph or Joe Oliver may refer to:

- Joseph Oliver (politician) (1852–1922), Canadian politician, mayor of Toronto in 1908 and 1909
- Joseph D. Oliver (1850–1933), American businessman
- Joe Oliver (baseball) (born 1965), American professional baseball player
- Joe Oliver (cricketer) (born 1946), English cricketer
- Joe Oliver (politician) (born 1940), Canadian politician and Minister of Finance
- Joe Oliver (rugby league) (fl. 1920–1940), English rugby league footballer of the 1920s, 1930s, and 1940s
- King Oliver (Joseph Nathan Oliver, 1885–1938), American bandleader and jazz musician

== See also ==
- Joseph Olivier (disambiguation)
