= Chris Oliver =

Chris Oliver may refer to:

- Chris Oliver (American football), American college football coach, head football coach at Lindsey Wilson College
- Chris Oliver (footballer) (born 1982), Kangaroos AFL footballer
- Chris Oliver (surgeon) (1960-2023), British surgeon and professor

== See also ==
- Criss Oliva (1963–1993), guitarist
- Oliver (surname)
