= Daniel Oliver =

Daniel Oliver may refer to:

- Daniel Oliver (botanist) (1830–1916), British botanist
- Daniel Oliver (physician) (1787–1842), American physician
- Daniel Oliver (policymaker) (1939–2026), chairman of US Federal Trade Commission
- Daniel C. Oliver (1865–1924), American U.S. Representative for New York
- Daniel T. Oliver (born 1945), United States Navy officer
- Dan Oliver, Australian visual effects supervisor
