= David Oliver =

David Oliver may refer to:

- David Oliver (actor) (1962–1992), American actor
- David Oliver (doctor) (born 1966), British geriatrician
- David Oliver (flautist) (1972–2012), Scottish musician and professor
- David Oliver (hurdler) (born 1982), American athlete
- David Oliver (ice hockey) (born 1971), Canadian ice hockey player in the NHL
- David Oliver (singer) (1942–1982), R&B singer
- Dave Oliver (trade unionist) (born 1963)
- David R. Oliver Jr. (born 1941), executive of the European Aeronautic Defense and Space Company for North America
- David W. Oliver (1819–1905), American politician
- Dave Oliver (born 1951), infielder and coach in Major League Baseball
- David "Ollie" Oliver, member of defunct British pop band Point Break
- David C. Oliver, computer scientist and founder of Cambridge Systems Technology
- David Oliver, American former police officer and radio personality: See WNIR (FM) § Current programming
