= William Oliver (artist, born 1823) =

English Victorian painter

- Born: 1823; Worcester, England
- Died: 1901 (aged 77–78); Kensington, London, England
- Occupation: Artist
- Spouse: Jane Elizabeth (Hughes) Williams
- Parent(s): William Williams, Jane (Oliver) Williams

William Oliver Williams (1823–1901) was an English figurative and genre artist based in London who specialised in paintings of young women. He used the professional name William Oliver. He has sometimes been mistakenly referred to as 'William Oliver the Younger' or 'William Oliver II'. He was, however, not (as implied) related to the artist William Oliver (1804–1853).

== Life and family ==
Oliver was born in Worcester in 1823, the son of the surgeon William Williams and his wife Jane Williams (née Oliver). He married Jane Elizabeth née Hughes in the district of St Pancras in London in 1852. Two of their sons, Oliver 'Rhys' Williams and Reginald Arthur Williams, also became established artists, with the professional names of Oliver Rhys and Reginald Arthur respectively. William Oliver died in Kensington on 16 April 1901. His obituary notice appeared in the Evening Standard the following day. It was stated as follows. 'OLIVER WILLIAMS, on the 16th inst., 41 Queensgate Gardens, South Kensington, William Oliver Williams ('William Oliver', artist) aged 77'.

== Career ==
Oliver was enrolled (as William Oliver Williams) as a Probationer at the Royal Academy Schools of the Royal Academy of Arts on 18 July 1848 (recommended by Thomas Clark (sic) from Birmingham) and as a student on 16 December 1848. The Schools' register, and other sources, indicate that he also worked at the Government School of Design, Birmingham (see Birmingham School of Art), where he was the assistant master (1849–1851) and the headmaster was Thomas Clarke (1846–1851). Whilst a student at the Royal Academy, he won 1st prize for his drawing from the antique in 1851 in the annual Premiums.

During the early part of Oliver's career he added his surname when signing his works. This was seen with his two works exhibited at the British Institution in 1851 and 1852. He also used the name William Oliver Williams when he exhibited six paintings between 1858 and 1863 at the Royal Academy of Arts. In 1858 the first of two paintings was titled Portrait of a gentleman while the second was Rev. B.H. Kennedy, President of the School of Art, Shrewsbury. At this time Oliver had a Shrewsbury address, possibly suggesting that he worked at the local school of art. The final painting in 1863 was titled Crossing the ford.

In the early 1850s, Oliver received a commission from the Arundel Society to tour Northern Italy and make drawings and watercolours of the classical masterpieces in the churches and galleries. His full name was first mentioned (as 'a young artist from the Royal Academy Schools') in the Society's fourth annual report in 1853. His task was to make drawings of Giotto's fresco in the Arena Chapel in Padua (see Scrovegni Chapel). Engravings were then made from these drawings. He therefore played a key role in producing one of the Arundel Society's most important early publications. Copies of the book of the engravings are in both the collections of the Royal Academy and the Royal Collection Trust

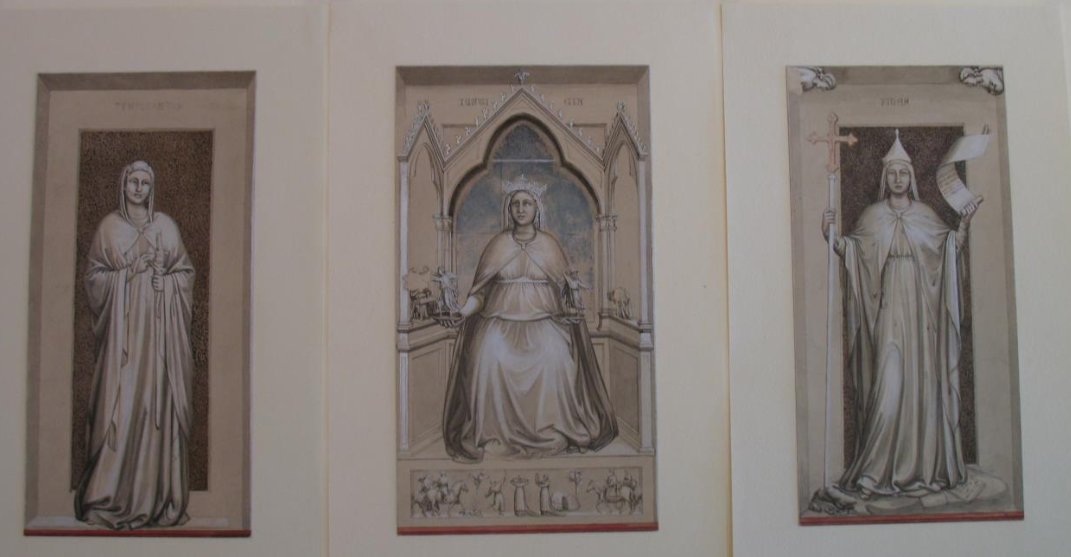
Giotto’s Virtues. Temperance, Justice and Faith from the Arena Chapel, Padua. Watercolours by William Oliver Williams (1823–1901).

Sixteen watercolours which Oliver is thought to have painted for the Arundel Society are recorded to have survived. In 1978, they were held in the Fine Art Department of the University of Leeds. More recently, three examples of these chiaroscuro watercolours have been reported to be held by the Victoria and Albert Museum Oliver also painted a number of additional watercolours derived from the Padua frescos, which he sold and which were owned privately in 1978. They have been described as 'highly finished and beautifully executed' and Oliver was described as 'a careful draughtsman and skilful water-colourist'. His watercolours were displayed by the Arundel Society at the Crystal Palace, Sydenham in 1855–6, and were praised by Dante Gabriel Rossetti.

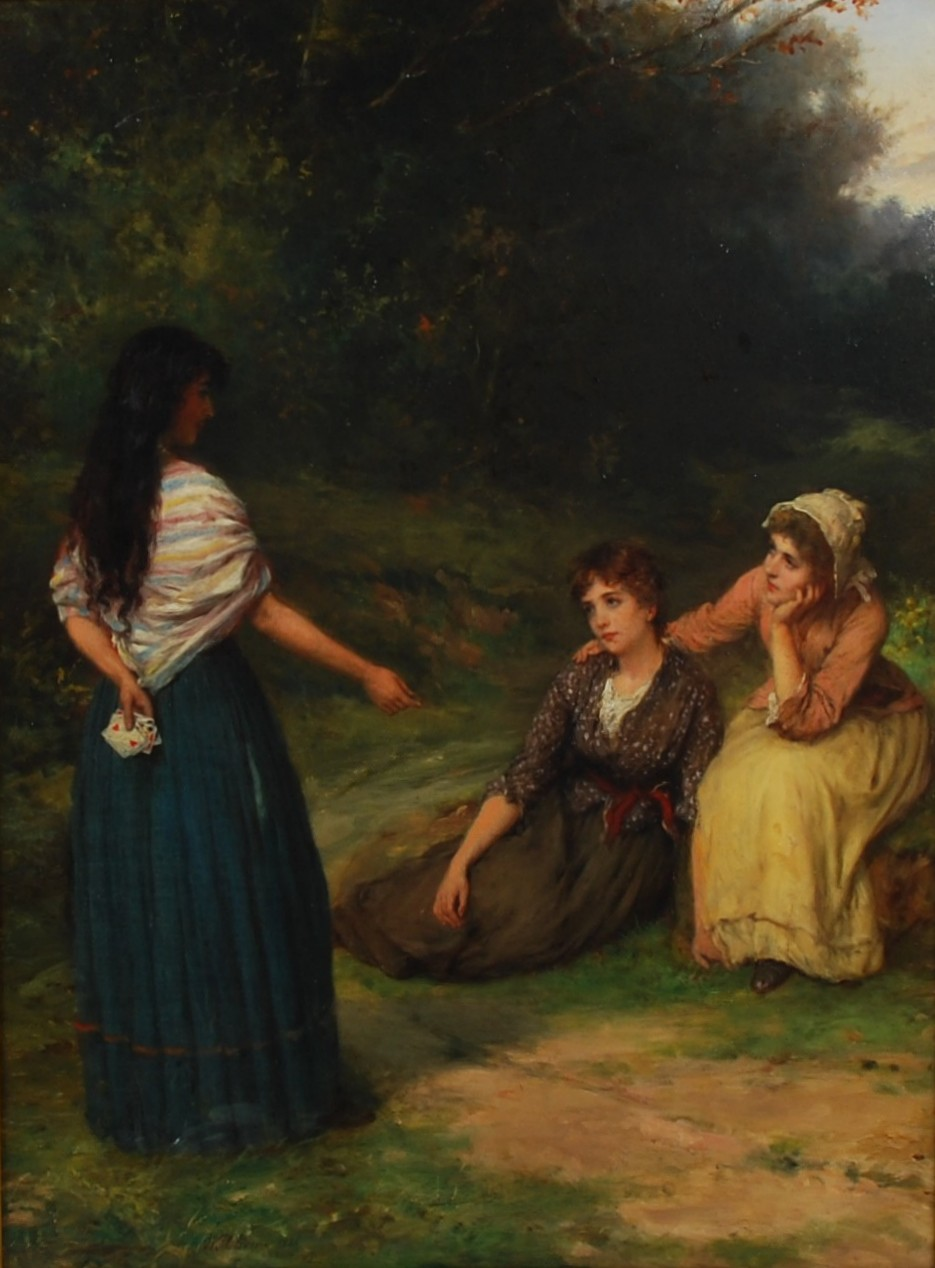
The fortune teller. Oil on canvas. Signed W. Oliver and dated 1886.

After recovering from bankruptcy in 1863, by the late 1860s he was based in London and had adopted his more well-known professional name which he used thereafter. He continued to exhibit at the Royal Academy of Arts and British Institution (Tryste) in 1867, and at the Society of British Artists (The First Letter) in 1868. Subsequently, he also exhibited at the Walker Art Gallery Liverpool, Manchester Art Gallery, Royal Birmingham Society of Artists and Royal Glasgow Institute of the Fine Arts. His favoured exhibition venue was the Royal Academy of Arts. He exhibited 15 more works there starting with A thing of beauty is a joy for ever and Forget me not in 1867, and finishing with Mrs Oliver Williams in 1897. It is recorded that at least one of his paintings had sold in one of the major auction galleries for more than £100 during the 1970–1975 period.

His works mainly depicted figures of young women and pretty girls, or an attractive woman sometimes in Greek or Roman costume. Oliver's paintings were popular at the time and prints were made in response to demand. This popularity is reflected in the fact that 33 of his paintings are exhibited in public museums and galleries throughout the United Kingdom, as seen on the Art UK web site. There is one of Oliver's oil paintings in the Royal Collection. It is titled Jack's Letter and is signed and dated 1881. It was presented by Mr and Mrs E. Johnson as a wedding present to the Duke and Duchess of York, 6 July 1893.

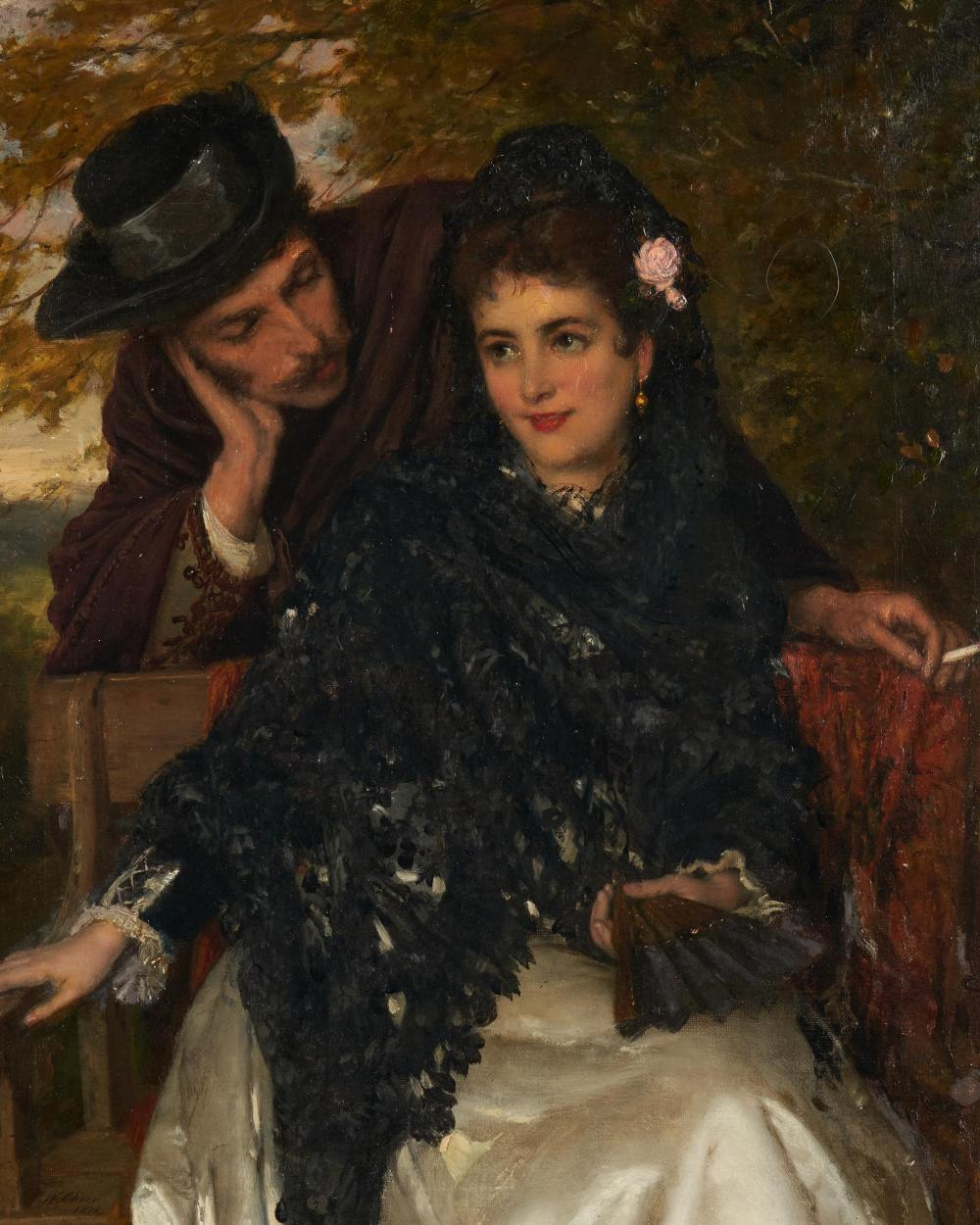
Spanish lovers. Oil on canvas. Signed W Oliver and dated 1878.

Oliver's paintings are still available from dealers and at auctions. Examples of high recent auction prices for his paintings are £4,320 for The letter at Bonhams on 21 June 2011, £5000 for Reclining Beauty at Christie's on 11 March 2015 and, remarkably, $40,960 (about £37,000) for Spanish Lovers at Case Auctions, Knoxville, Tennessee on 30 January 2021.
