= Judge Oliver =

Judge Oliver may refer to:

- John Watkins Oliver (1914–1990), judge of the United States District Court for the Western District of Missouri
- Solomon Oliver Jr. (born 1947), judge of the United States District Court for the Northern District of Ohio
- Vernon D. Oliver (born 1971), judge of the United States District Court for the District of Connecticut
- Webster Oliver (1888–1969), chief judge of the United States Customs Court
