= Mariano Puigdollers Oliver =

Spanish academic, politician, and civil servant

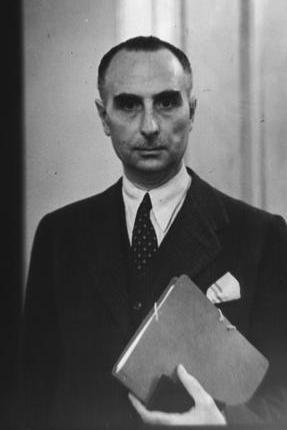
- Born: Mariano Puigdollers Oliver; 1896; Madrid, Spain
- Died: 1984 (aged 87–88); Madrid, Spain
- Occupations: academic, civil servant

Mariano Puigdollers Oliver (1896–1984) was a Spanish academic, politician and civil servant.

Between 1920 and 1966 he held various jurisprudence chairs in numerous Spanish universities, mostly in Valencia (1924-1936) and in Madrid (1940-1966); he is known among key representatives of Spanish Natural law of the 1940s and 1950s. Initially a conservative monarchist, in the mid-1930s he joined Carlism and briefly served as its regional Valencian jefe. Since the late 1930s he identified with the Franco regime. During early and mid-Francoism he was employed at key posts at Dirección General de Asuntos Ecclesiásticos department within the Ministry of Justice, at Consejo Superior de Protección de Menores and at Consejo Superior de Investigaciones Científicas. Between 1943 and 1965 he served in the Francoist Cortes. He is considered one of key officials implementing post-civil-war purges among the academics.

== Family and youth ==
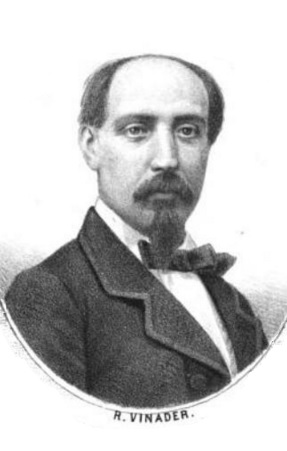
great-grandfather

Mariano was descendant to an old Catalan family; the Puigdollers were of noble origins and got very much branched throughout the centuries. Some of his distant ancestors and relatives distinguished themselves locally as writers, lawyers or astronomers. His paternal grandfather Mariano Puigdollers, the native of Vich, was a craftsman and member of the local petty bourgeoisie. He married a local girl, María Vinader; she was the daughter of Ramón Vinader, a conservative Cortes deputy during the late Isabelline period and the minister of justice in the Estella-based Carlist government during the Third Carlist War. Their son and Mariano's father, Mariano Puigdollers Vinader (died 1928), moved from Catalonia to Madrid, where he initially worked in a jewelry studio and specialized in diamonds; it is not clear whether he was its owner. At unspecified time he married Remedios Oliver Ceniceros, originating from La Mancha but partially Catalan herself; nothing closer is known about her family. In 1903 Mariano Puigdollers Vinader and his brother Luciano purchased a defunct watermill La Moneda in Segovia; they re-launched it in 1907 and operated afterwards. After death of her husband Remedios Oliver sold the business.

The couple had numerous children; Mariano was the oldest son. They lived in the Madrid district of Buenavista, raised in a very pious ambience marked by Catholic zeal and multiple religious engagements of Puigdollers Vinader. It is not clear where Puigdollers Oliver received his early education. Then he joined the Madrid Instituto General y Técnico de San Isidro and obtained baccalaureate with excellent marks in 1911. At unspecified time though probably in the early 1910s Puigdollers enrolled at Facultad de Derecho y Ciencias Sociales at Universidad Central in Madrid; he graduated in 1916. Initially he intended to join Cuerpo de Letrados del Consejo de Estado, an elite group of lawyers working for a governmental consultative body; however, as recruitment was adjourned, he opted for doctoral research in law. In 1919 he got his PhD laurels thanks to a thesis on Christian German philosophy of law. The same year Puigdollers applied for a post at Universidad de Murcia, but eventually he switched to Galicia and having defeated 33 counter-candidates in 1920 he assumed the chair of Elementos de Derecho Natural at the faculty of law of Universidad de Santiago.

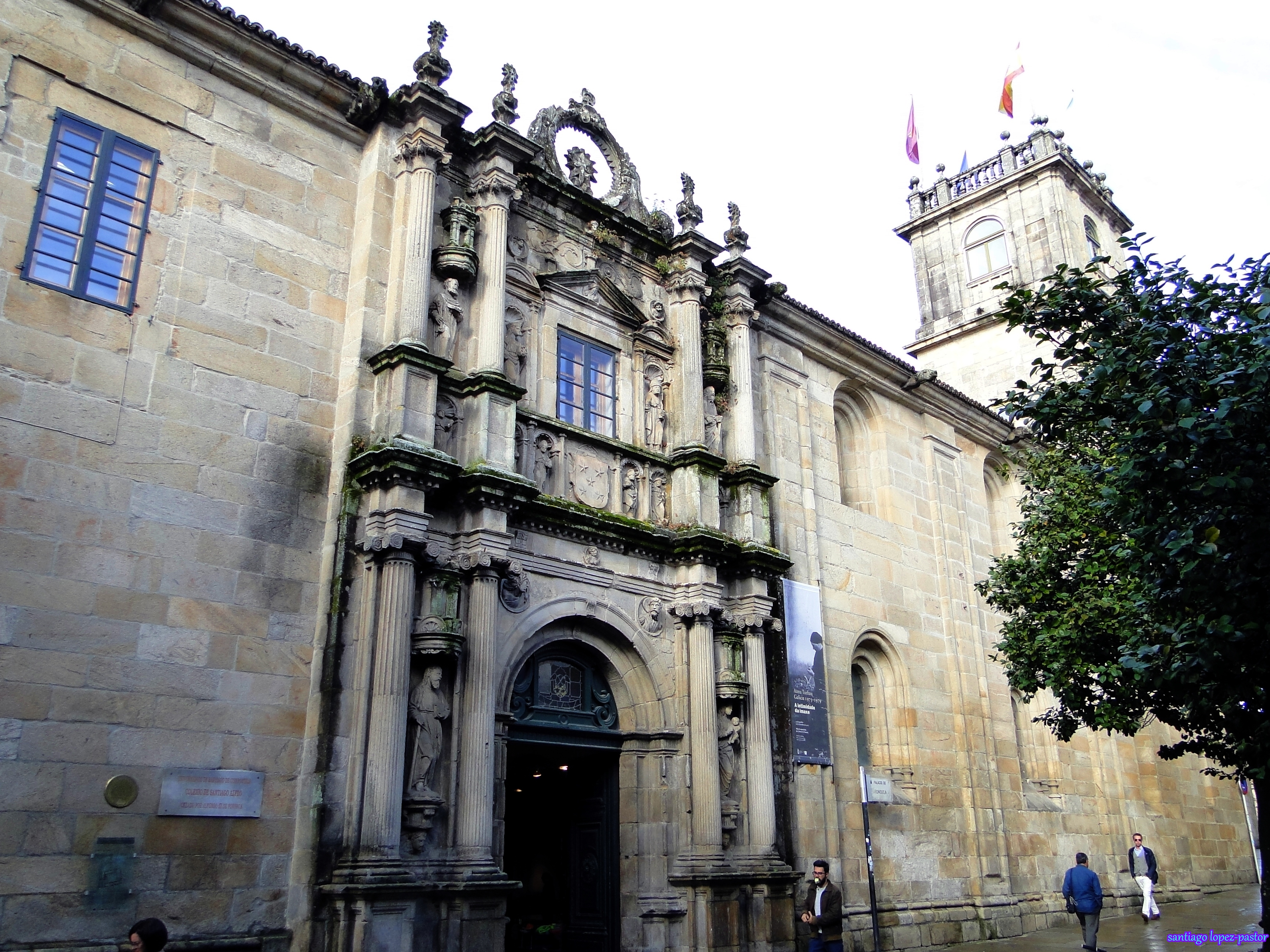
University of Santiago

In 1922 Puigdollers married María Isabel del Rio y Pérez-Caballero (died 1982); she was daughter to José del Río y Paternina, an engineer and head of Negociado de Montes department in Dirección General de Agricultura, Industria y Comercio, itself the section of Ministerio de Fomento. The couple had no children; until outbreak of the Civil War they lived mostly in Valencia, afterwards in Madrid. Among more distant Puigdollers’ relatives the one which gained nationwide notoriety was his paternal cousin, Josep Dencas Puigdollers, an Estat Català politician, Cortes deputy during the Republic days and member of the Catalan self-government in 1932-1934. The younger brother of Mariano, Luciano, also an ACNdP activist, was killed by Republican militiamen when trying to flee to Andorra in 1938.

== Academic career ==
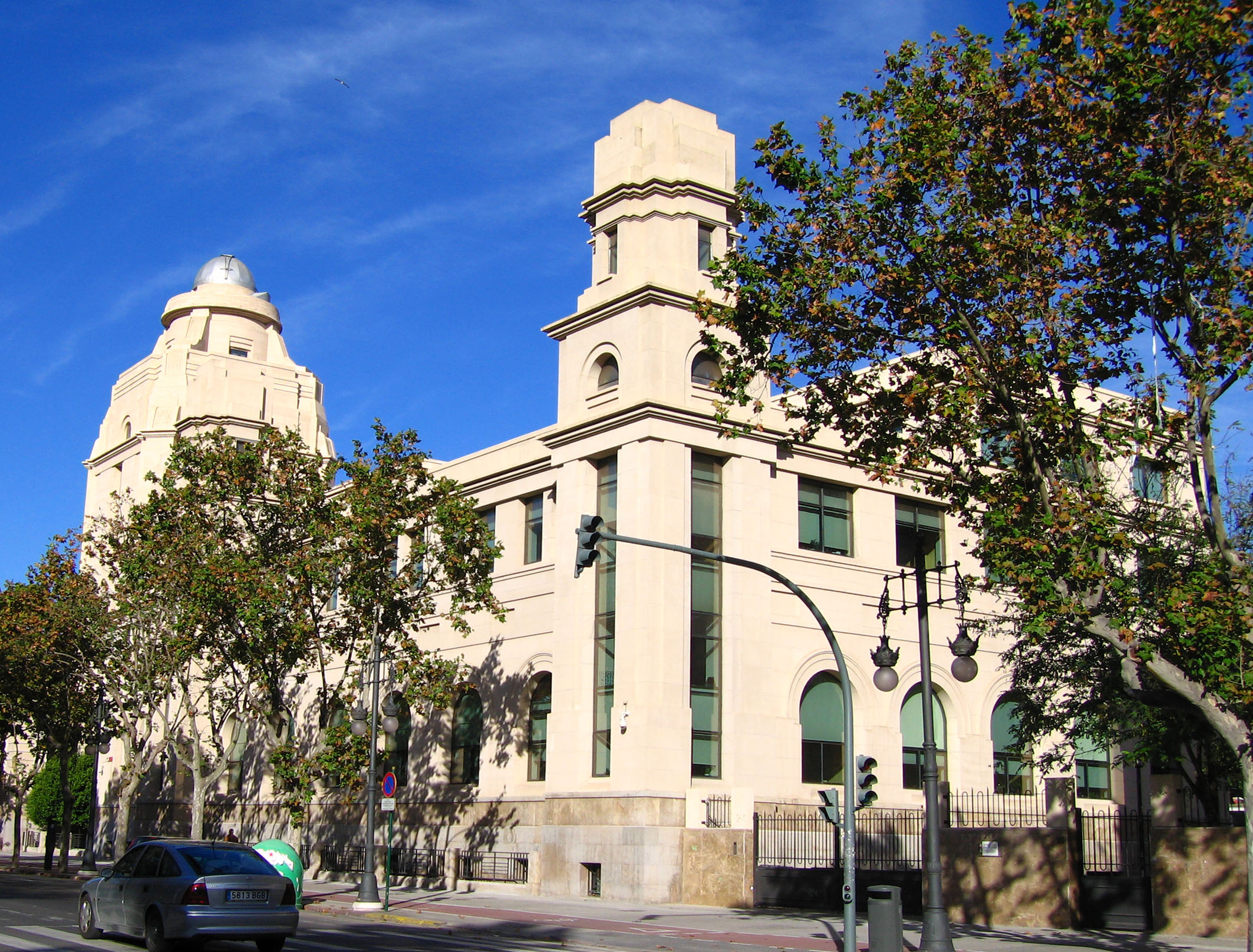
University of Valencia

When assuming Elementos de Derecho Natural in Santiago in 1920 Puigdollers took over an auxiliary post and according to his later account, as a hardline Catholic he was constantly harassed by academics of Institución Libre de Enseñanza. In 1922 he was listed at position 488 at the national ranking of academics; the same year he took over the same chair in Seville. In 1924 he moved to Valencia, still chairing Elementos de Derecho Natural. Initially he was among the youngest catedráticos, in constant pursuit of permanent employment. Over time his position grew; apart from supervising secondary education in the late 1920s he was also taking part in internal assignment procedures. He was also appointed to internal bodies investigating disciplinary cases. The one which gained particular attention was a 1929 investigation related to a secondary school professor, charged with antipatriotic and antireligious propaganda. Puigdollers was nominated juez instructor; he found the defendant guilty and recommended most severe measures, which indeed led to the person in question being fired.

According to some historians, in the early 1930s Puigdollers started to count among “profesores más brillantes” of law in Valencia; on the other hand, he published relatively few works and trailed behind many of his Valencian academic peers. In 1931 he was listed at position 331 in the national academic ranking. According to his own account, the new Republican authorities targeted him for ideological purges. Puigdollers was reportedly blacklisted by Fernando de los Ríos, minister of high education and the liberal militant pundit; it was the right-wing electoral victory of 1933 which prevented Puigdollers’ dismissal. He continued at his Valencian post until outbreak of the Civil War; in 1935 he was listed at position 263 in the academic ranking.

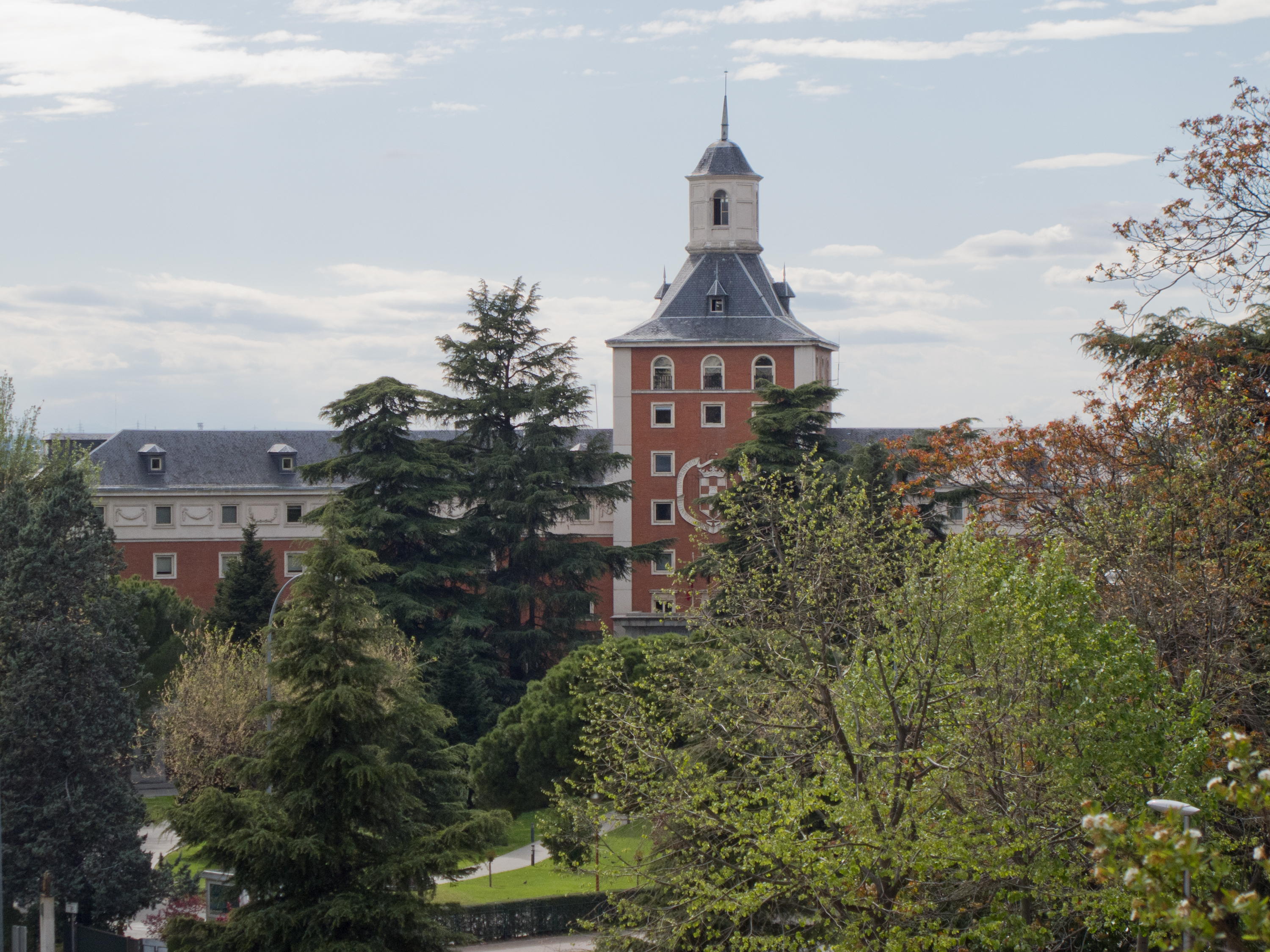
Complutense University, Madrid

The years of 1936-1939 mark the pause in Puigdollers’ academic career; at one point he was fired by the Valencian University, but got reinstated once the Nationalists took over the city and formally was employed there until 1940. However, since 1939 he was already related to Universidad de Madrid, e.g. when sitting in the jury assessing PhD thesis of Josemaría Escriva. His initial 1940 bid for the chair of philosophy of law in Madrid failed, but during another recruitment later the same year he was successful; his spell at the chair of filosofía de derecho would last 25 years. Between 1947 and 1951 he headed an internal committee enforcing discipline at the faculties of law and letters; he directed purges aimed at staff deemed non-compliant with the Francoist regime. He kept climbing the official academic ranking and in 1954 entered its sección primera; in 1958 he was ranked at position 19. In the late 1950s and early 1960s he was among the most distinguished academics of the capital, not infrequently delivering lectures at inauguration of academic courses at the University. In the mid-1960s and with 46 years of teaching he counted among the longest serving law professors, in escalafón ranked as nr 1; he retired in 1966.

== Thought and works ==
Already during his doctoral research Puigdollers focused on philosophy of law, the discipline he pursued for the rest of his life; in his choice he was inspired mostly by Fernando Pérez Bueno. Initially Puigdollers was particularly impressed by a Thomist Viktor Cathrein, to whom he dedicated the doctoral dissertation and whose thought contributed to Puigdoller's own view on law, ethics and society. In the 1920s he turned towards the heritage of Luis Vives, presented in terms of “most pure” Spanish and Catholic orthodoxy. Works of Antonio Rosmini and Luigi Taparelli directed Puigdollers towards Christian social thought, while his concept of natural law was worked out thanks to influence of contemporary iusnaturalists from the older generation, Mendizábal Martín, Rodríguez de Cepeda and González Castejon Elio.

Puigdollers is considered a representative of “filosofía jurídica neotimista”, a firm neo-Thomist and even “best Spanish expert on St. Thomas”. Within broader perspective he is usually categorized as neo-Scholastic Natural Law thinker; some name him an example of “iusnaturalismo neoscolástico” vs. “iusnaturalismo neokantiano”, “iusnaturalismo de los valores” and “iusnaturalismo renovador”, other prefer to count him among “filosofía tomista y neotomista” vs. “filosofía neokantina” and “filosofía de los valores”. In more specific typologies Puigdollers is deemed to be a member of Catholic/scholastic school vs. Falangist/ortegian school, the two competing for domination in Spanish philosophy of law of the 1940s. General accounts present him among key scholars of “pensamiento reaccionario y conservador” or thinkers within “una corriente precisamente tradicional, … habitualmente conservadora y hasta reaccionaria en lo político”. Some historians claim that he endorsed Fascist thought as related to this of St. Thomas, others maintain that he defended Christian philosophy against 20th-century theories. His understanding of human rights was reportedly derived from Christian theology and opposed to heritage of the French Revolution.

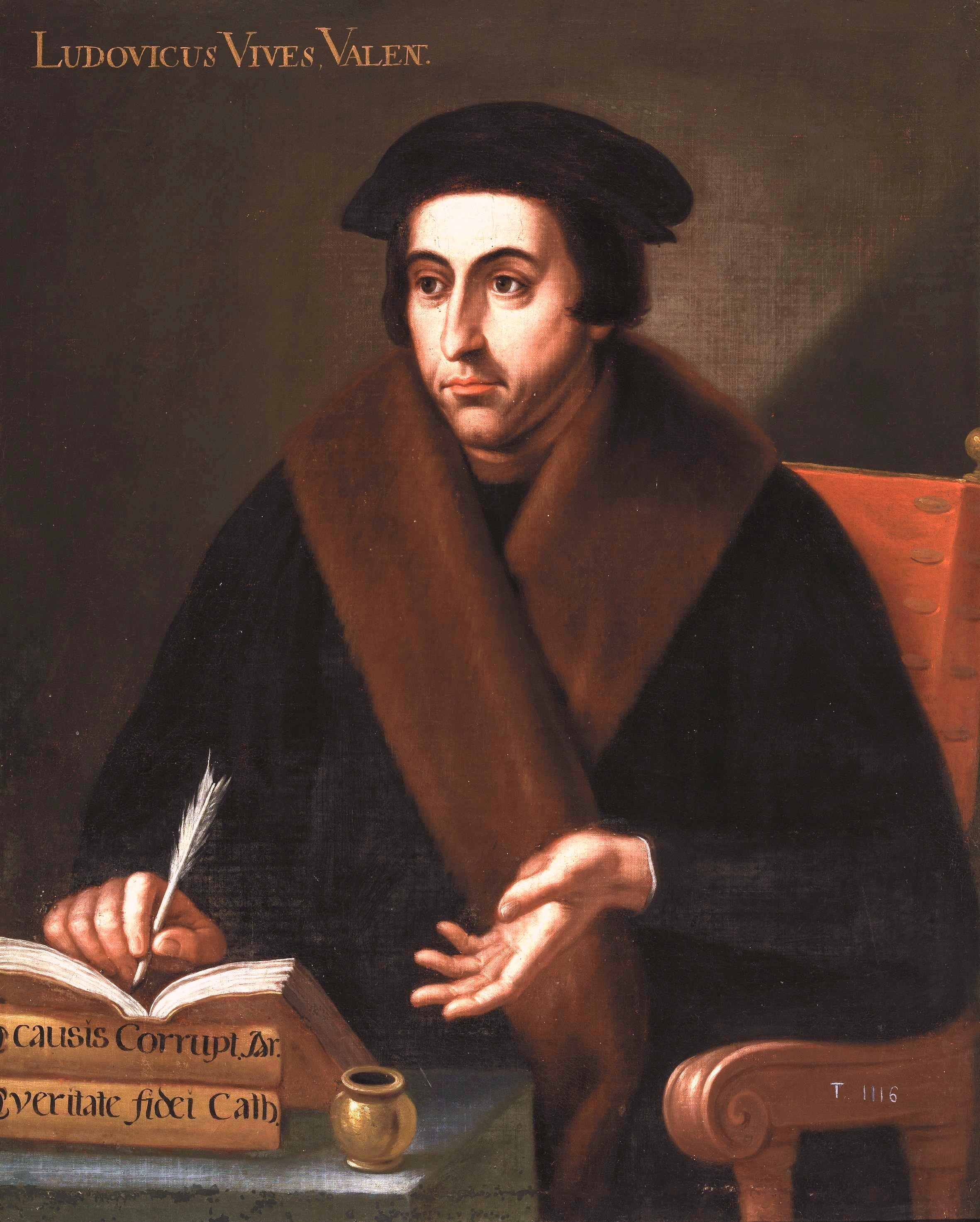
Luis Vives

All scholars agree that Puigdollers contributed to supremacy of iusnaturalismo in the Spanish philosophy of law of early and mid-Francoism; some refer to “escuela de Mariano Puigdollers”, which in the 1940s and 1950s inspired Agustín de Asis Garrote or Traditionalist thinkers like Francisco Elías de Tejada and Francisco Puy Muñoz. However, Puigdollers’ own thought is not counted as part of Traditionalism; if named “traditionalist” it is rather because of his political engagements and not because of his theoretical vision. His key work is the in-depth study La filosofía española de Luis Vives (1940); other major works are philosophy of law course-books Programa para un curso de Elementos de Derecho Natural (1920) and Lecciones de Filosofía del Derecho (1947) and his PhD dissertation, La filosofía del Derecho de Victor Catherein (1920). A theoretical study, La justicia. Estudio filosófico-jurídico, remained unedited. Other Puigdollers’ writings are booklets with his earlier lectures, articles in specialized periodicals or prologues to juridical works.

== Conservative monarchist ==
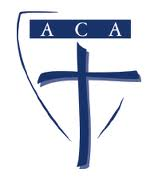
Acción Católica logotype

Puigdollers’ great-grandfather was a Carlist minister and his own father was as Carlist as well, though possibly he later adhered to the breakaway Integrist branch; however, there is no evidence of Puigdollers’ Carlist engagements during his youth. He was rather noted as involved in lay Catholic organizations; the first one was Los Luises, where he delivered lectures and where he grew to Junta Directiva of the Madrid branch in 1918. The same year he entered ACNdP and in 1919 was active among Los Terciarios Franciscanos. At the turn of the decade and like many ACNdP militants he turned towards social issues and was attracted to an emerging grouping of likewise minded Christian activists. During his Galician spell Puigdollers was supporting emergence of related syndicates, named Acción Social Popular; during his Andalusian spell in the early 1920s he joined the newly established Partido Social Popular and was member of its comisión organizadora in Seville; he also presided over its Sección de Estudios Político-Sociales and tried to animate Catholic syndicalism.

Upon the advent of Primo de Rivera's dictatorship PSP dissolved itself and readily contributed to institutionalization of the regime. Also Puigdollers personally welcomed the dictatorship as “awakening of the Spanish conscience and joint communitarian effort of the nation”. There is no confirmation of his membership in Primo's structures like Unión Patriótica or Somatén, yet it is clear that at his university position he enthusiastically promoted “patriarchal society of the primoriverrista dictatorship” and was noted as one of the most conservative professors at the already right-wing-dominated University. In 1928 Puigdollers got engaged in peculiar arbitration labor structures of the regime and was appointed member of the local Comité Paritario; the same year he was nominated consejal to the city ayuntamiento. Growing to secretary of the Valencian ACNdP branch, he kept publishing booklets and delivering lectures at Catholic organizations like Centro Escolar y Mercantil, Asociación de Amigos de Luis Vives or Acción Católica.

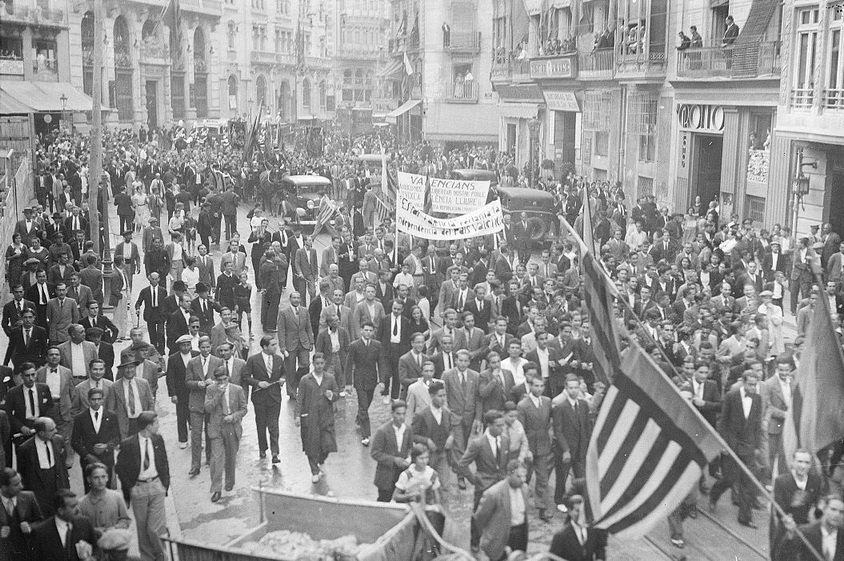
street demonstration in Valencia, early 1930s

Following the fall of Primo Puigdollers engaged in the emerging Valencian branch of Unión Monárquica Nacional, a broad Alfonsist conservative party which disintegrated shortly upon advent of the Spanish Republic. Though he viewed the new regime as national disaster, Puigdollers did not join any of the mushrooming new political parties. Instead, in the early 1930s he neared a monarchist circle related to the review Acción Española and from its pages sniped against the Republic; his last contribution identified is from 1935. He continued as conservative Catholic pundit delivering lectures, e.g. at Legión Católica Española Acción Católica or Asociación Universitaria Católica de Derecho. One more thread of his public activity was teaching at private Catholic education establishments; apart from Centro Escolar y Mercantil they included Escuela de Formacion Social de Valencia, founded by the Valencian branch of AC, and in Instituto Social Obrero of Valencia; since 1934 he was its director. Continuously viewed as member of the “most conservative” sector in Valencia University during the so-called bienio negro he protested university nominations considered subversive.

== Carlist ==
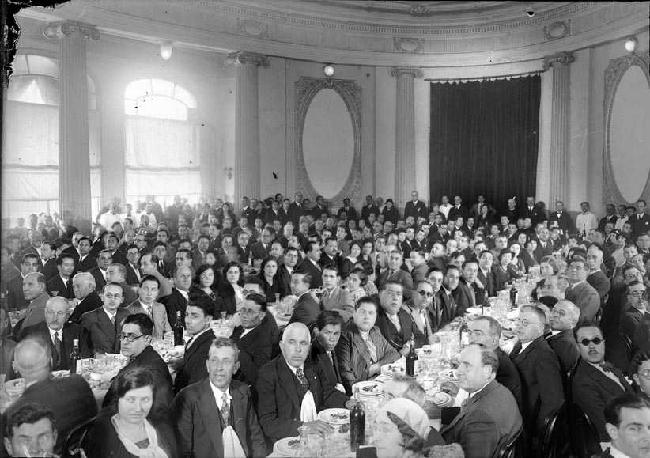
Carlist banquet, early 1930s

Despite his family Carlist antecedents Puigdollers is not known for any legitimist engagements prior to 1936. It is not clear when exactly and why he approached Comunión Tradicionalista, though some press notes suggest that his commitment to the cause lasted at least since the mid-1930s. During the 1936 electoral campaign to the Cortes he stood in Valencia province as a Traditionalist candidate within a broad right-wing alliance. Some 125,000 votes gathered were not enough to ensure triumph, but Puigdollers continued his political bid. In March 1936 the Carlist leader Manuel Fal Conde nominated him the regional party jefe, a fairly important position given relatively important role of Valencia in the nationwide Carlist network. None of the sources consulted provides details of the nomination and clarifies what mechanism elevated a well-known, but previously unrelated academic to the post of regional leader. Puigdollers assumed an active stance and was soon noted speaking at public Carlist rallies.

In late spring of 1936 Puigdollers was among key civilians engaged in anti-Republican conspiracy in the Valencian region; as one of 3 members of Comité de Alzamiento he held talks with the military from UME when arranging preparations for the rising. His exact whereabouts during the July Coup are unknown, except that he remained in Valencia; following the loyalist triumph Puigdollers went into hiding, in unclear circumstances managed to leave the Republican zone and in early September 1936 he was already in the Nationalist headquarters in Burgos. He was integrated within the wartime Carlist national executive, Junta Suprema Militar, and within Sección de Asuntos Generales he assumed jefatura of the newly created Delegación General de Enseñanza. Nothing is known of Puigdollers’ activity at this post. Instead, in early 1937 he was recorded among Carlist heavyweights discussing potential merger with Falange Española; in February in the Portuguese Insua he was undecided, but during later talks with Falangist leaders he seemed favorably disposed towards some sort of alliance.

Carlist standard

Puigdollers was among the Carlists who complied with terms of the unification, imposed by Franco on both the Falangists and the Carlists. In late April 1937 he was nominated to Comisión de Cultura y Enseñanza, one of 6 departments in the Francoist quasi-government, Junta Técnica de Estado; within the commission he headed the sub-section of primary education. Within the body, largely busy with purges among the teaching staff, Puigdollers was one of the hardliners. However, Puigdollers demonstrated some unease about Carlist marginalization within the new Francoist structures. In October 1937 he did not appear – though he was supposed to attend – at an official academic rally in Burgos, intended to demonstrate unity of the Falangist and Carlist youth. Moreover, he was also suspected of instigating the Carlist participants and hence being co-responsible for cries “¡muera Franco, traidor!”, heard at the assembly. In response, the FET secretary Joaquín Miranda fined Puigdollers, suspended his party membership and deposed him from all functions, including the state ones; Puigdollers was also barred from re-assuming any official post until October 1939.

== Francoist: Asuntos Ecclesiásticos ==
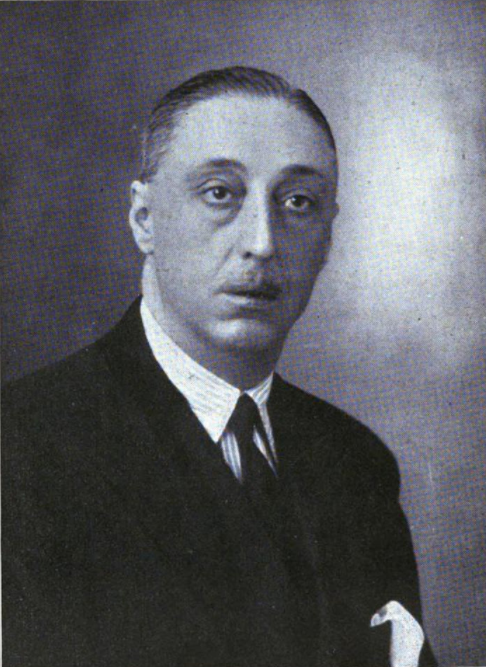
Rodezno

Despite Puigdollers’ ban on holding official posts, in early 1938 his fellow Carlist conde Rodezno, the minister of justice in the first Francoist government, appointed Puigdollers the head of Dirección General de Asuntos Eclesiásticos; the department was responsible for relations with the Catholic Church. Since March 1938 he talked to Vatican on derogation of Republican divorce regulations and marriages concluded by the divorcees. Another thread of his activity was channeling state funds for reconstruction of churches and convents destroyed in what used to be the Republican zone. Corresponding with the primate and local hierarchs, Puigdollers arranged massive administrative assistance for the Church, including concessions, tax exemptions, registration of various organizations or financial assistance to families of the religious killed by the Republicans. He also encouraged depuration in religious ranks, especially with regard to priests harboring nationalist Basque or Catalan ideas.

Puigdollers’ relations with the hierarchy were excellent. A member of executive bodies of various lay Catholic organizations, in 1938 he entered Consejo Nacional of ACNdP and attended its congress in Budapest; in 1940 he was nominated by cardinal Goma to Consejo Superior de Acción Católica. Some scholars present him as a man of the Church who infiltrated official administration and tried to counter religiously lukewarm Falangist designs. In 1943 as director of Asuntos Ecclesiásticos and unofficial Carlist representative Puigdollers spoke to the US ambassador Hayes; during the conversation he tried to dissociate the Francoist system from Nazism and kept underling its Catholic profile. In historiography his efforts are considered successful, though he is not listed among key architects of the alliance between the Francoist state and the hierarchy.

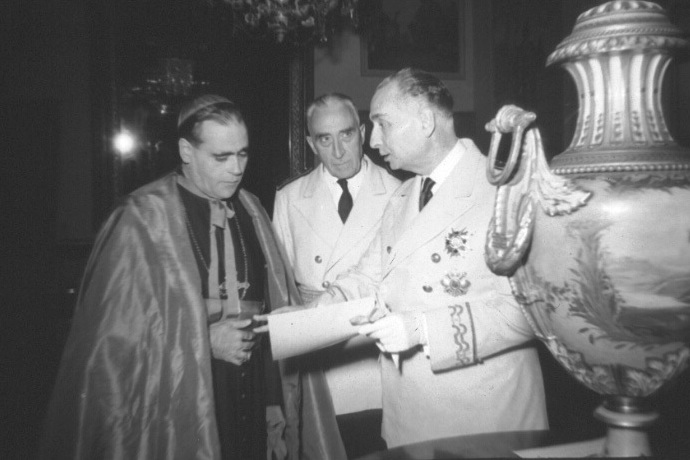
Puigdollers (1fR) at official recognition of bishopric investiture of José Bascuñana i López, 1955

Puigdollers kept channeling funds for reconstruction of religious buildings until the early 1950s. At that time he was also engaged in thorny concordat negotiations with Vatican; it is not clear what position he took. Once the document was signed, in the mid-1950s he was busy with its application; in public lectures he hailed the agreement as expression of perfect understanding between the Francoist state and the Holy See. He was hardly missing on most high-profile religious events of the time, opening institutions and exhibitions, attending conferences and commemorative events or taking part in Semana Santa; he usually represented the minister of justice. He was within the Spanish contingent present during the funeral of Pius XII in 1958 and this of John XXIII in 1963. However, it is unclear what position he took towards deteriorating relations between the state and the Church, as in the early 1960s the latter started to distance itself from the regime; nothing is known of his opinion about the first draft of the law on religious liberty, promoted by Fernando Castiella and Manuel Fraga in 1964. His public statements, like the 1964 lecture opening the academic course in Madrid, were perfectly aligned with the official policy; Puigdollers defended the so-called “derecho de presentación” and spoke against revision of the concordat. He ceased as director general de Asuntos Eclesiásticos in 1965, after 27 years in office.

== Francoist: in CSIC ==
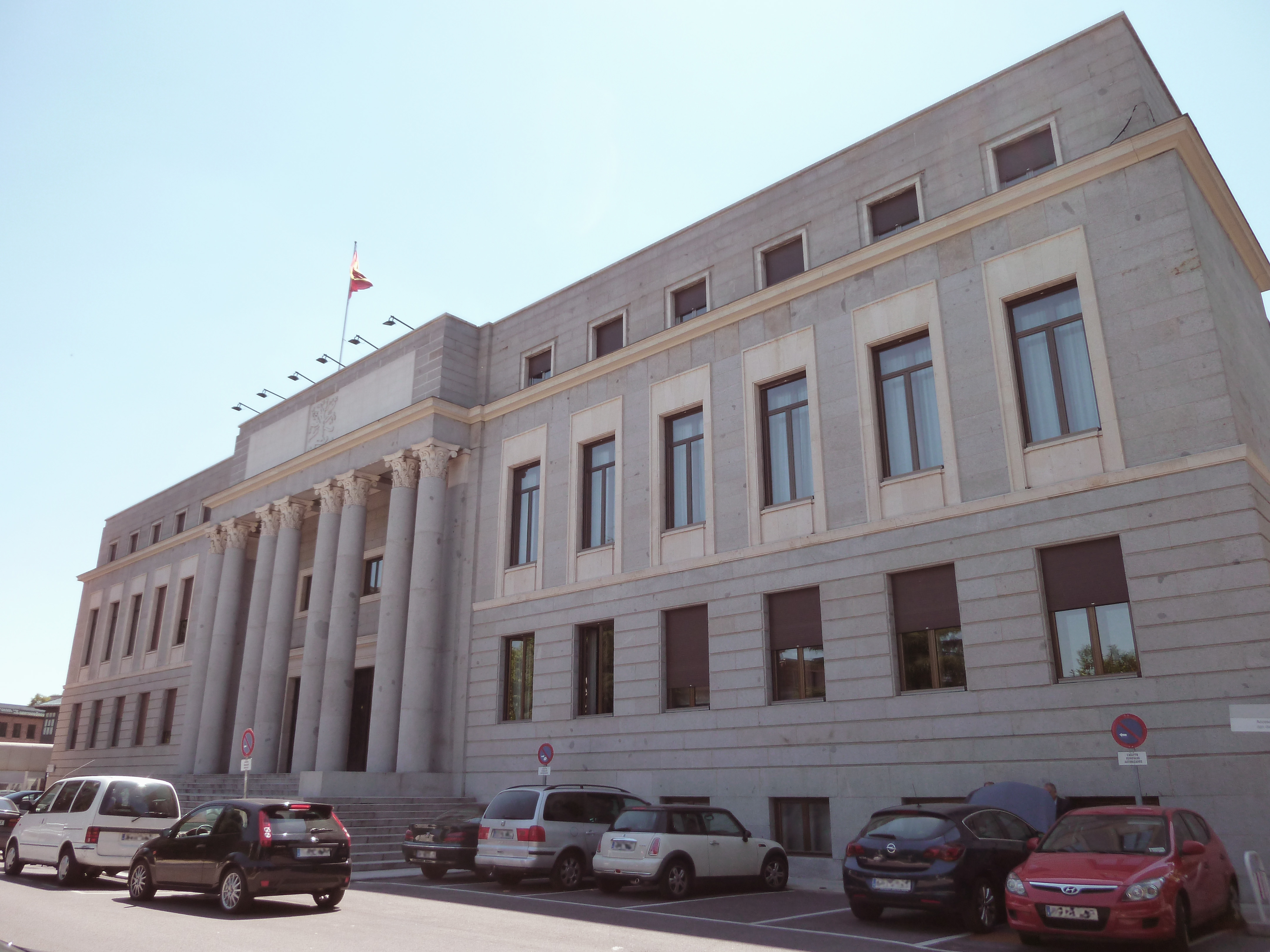
CSIC headquarters, Madrid

In 1938 Puigdollers was re-admitted to official education structures; some scholars claim he kept working in Comisión de Cultura y Enseñanza, the body which was dissolved following formation of the first regular Francoist government. Others focus rather on Consejo Superior de Investigaciones Científicas, a newly created board supposed to co-ordinate scientific research and subordinated to the newly created Ministry of Education; since 1940 he headed a CSIC section focused on philosophy, theology, juridical and economic sciences. Most authors agree, however, that once in 1939 he had successfully passed the formal purge procedure himself, Puigdollers started to co-ordinate the process of purging universities of unaligned professors. Within a triumvirate formed jointly with Eugenio Vegas Latapié and Enrique Suñer Ordóñez he reportedly controlled access to academic posts in the period of the late 1930s and the early 1940; some scholars speak about “terror intellectual” they inflicted upon the academic world.

In historiography there are slightly different opinions on Puigdollers’ role in CSIC of the 1940s and 1950s. In most works the stress is on his role in repressive measures against academics considered not sufficiently committed to the regime and on implementation of the Francoist orthodoxy. Some scholars, however, prefer rather to note his stand in confronting the Falangist influence. They claim that CSIC was “principal cover for Opus Dei's assault on higher education”, a vehicle of imposing Catholic doctrine within the Spanish academic structures. Within this perspective, Puigdollers along scholars like Miguel Sancho Izquierdo, Enrique Luño Peña, José Corts Grau, Francisco Elías de Tejada and Joaquín Ruiz-Gimenez served as a bulwark against the Falangist, Ortega-oriented current in philosophy of law. Puigdollers was also involved in controversy which seems to be of personal origin.

Opus Dei logotype

According to some authors, by means of his presence in CSIC Puigdollers controlled access to professorships in the philosophy of law until the 1960s. However, other historians claim that in the mid-1950s he was gradually losing ground in the scientific board. As a scholar of traditionalist leaning he was increasingly at odds with a group of officials representing the Opus Dei clique, dominating in CSIC. They were reportedly bent on getting Don Juan Carlos declared as the future Spanish king and determined not to allow control of the body by another monarchist grouping. Perturbed by proliferation of books of “un-spoilt Traditionalist thought” and resolute to counter Carlist cultural policy, in 1957 they allegedly blocked Puigdollers’ access to presidency of the Consejo. In the late 1950s the opusdeistas, led by Laureano López Rodó, prevented also Puigdollers’ rise to president of Insituto de Estudios Jurídicos, where he was promoted by the Carlists. According to some scholars, his failure to land the job was detrimental to Traditionalist offensive in media, culture and science; they “perdieron las armas para hacer en estos cinco años una docena de catedráticos, que el carlismo necesita”.

== Francoist: penitentiary system official ==
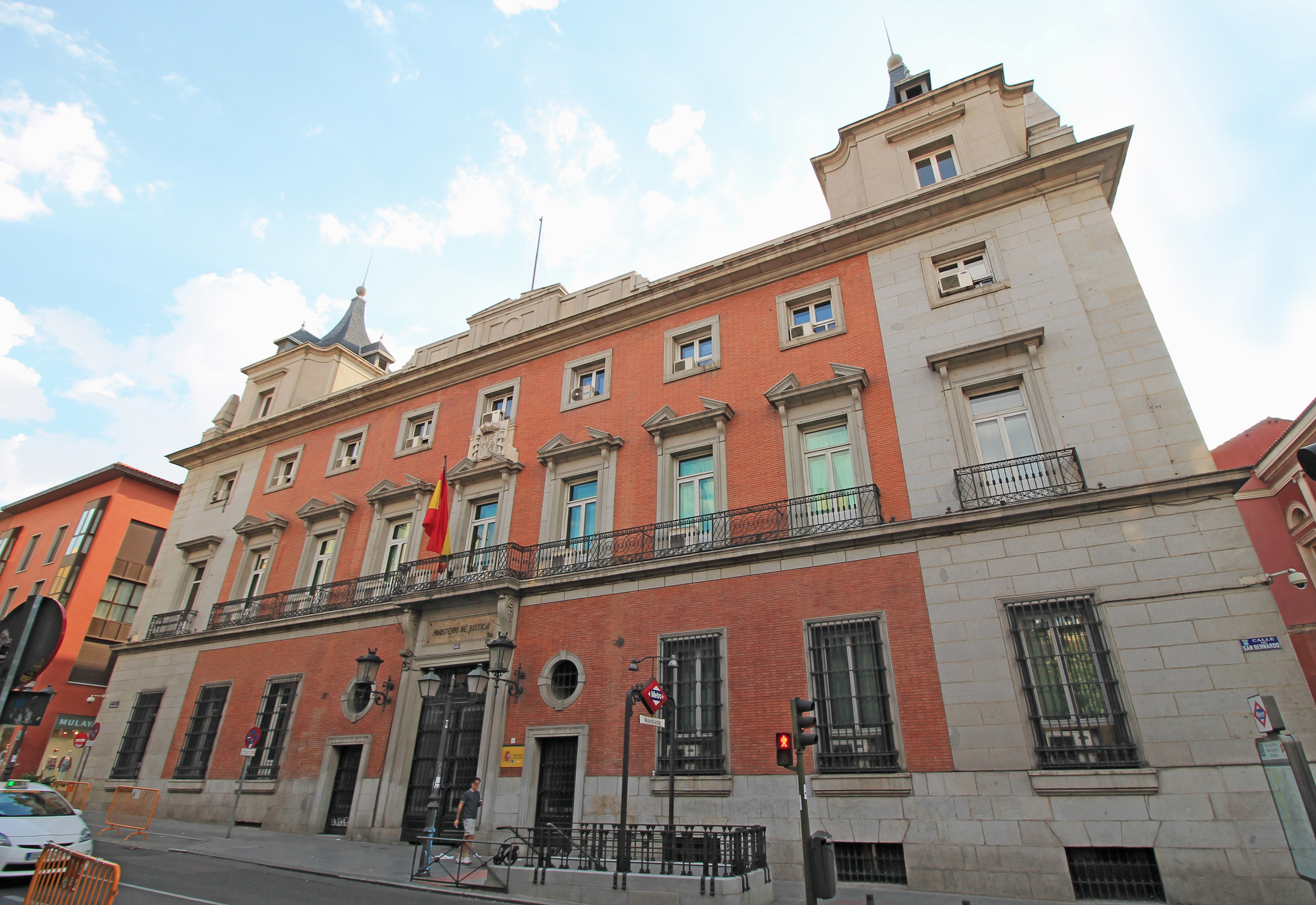
Ministry of Justice, Madrid

In mid-1938 Puigdollers was appointed to Consejo Superior de Protección de Menores, a body controlled by the Ministry of Justice and entrusted with management of redemption program for juvenile offenders. Initially nominated its vice-president, in 1941 he was already referred to as president of the body. It is not clear how long he headed the Consejo, as in the early 1950s he was again noted as its vice-president. In addition, since 1941 Puigdollers served as president of Tribunal de Apelación de Menores and as member of Patronato de Protección a la Mujer, one more Ministry of Justice dependent body bent on preventing female crime; it dealt chiefly with prostitution, though was also engaged in ideology-driven repressive measures. Last but not least, since the early 1940s Puigdollers was also director and professor of Ética y Derecho Natural at Escuela de Estudios Penitenciarios in Madrid. Like in case of education, also as prominent official within the Francoist penitentiary system Puigdollers is viewed as an ACNdP man, who together with conde Rodezno, José Agustín Perez del Pulgar and Maximo Cuervo Radigales worked on particular state and Church synergy. During early Francoism they were the men who “legislaron todo lo relative a la organización de prisiones y además escribieron sobre ello”.

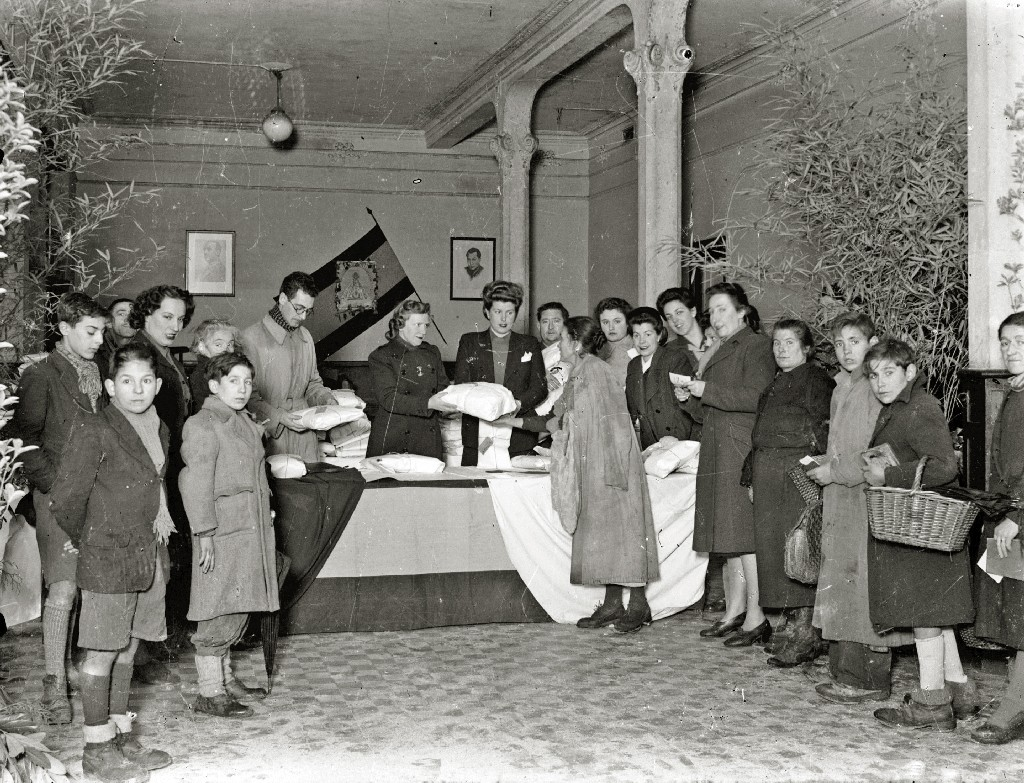
Francoist campaign to aid poor women and youngsters, Spain, mid-1940s

It is not clear how long Puigdollers served in Tribunal de Apelación and the women's Patronato; last press notes on his engagement come from the early 1940s. It is not the case of Consejo Superior de Protección de Menores; in 1948 Puigdollers has already received corporate homages for 10 years of his engagement in juvenile redemption system. He kept serving as vice-president throughout the 1950s and entered Junta Nacional contra el Analfabetismo. Puigdollers believed that juvenile crime was not the product of social or economic conditions, but resulted mostly from deficiencies in family life; hence, his focus was on enhancing traditional values in the Spanish society. His views on dynamics of juvenile crime are not clear; during a closed session in 1960 he expressed concern about growing crime among the youth, principally car theft, vandalism and sex-related offences; however, in a widely publicized statement of 1961 he declared that in principle, there was no such thing as juvenile crime in Spain. Upon achieving the regular retirement age in 1965 Puigdollers resigned from his scholarship at Escuela de Estudios Penitenciarios, but his duties at Patronato continued. The same year he was again appointed its acting president and performed this role until 1968, when he was nominated the honorary president. However, he retained some influence within the organization, as at the turn of the 1960s and 1970s he was still recorded as engaged in some of its activities. Like 30 years earlies, his focus was on co-operation with the Church and role of religious re-education institutions, like the ones ran by the Jesuits.

== Francoist: procurador and afterwards ==
CoA of Francoist Spain

Because of his official assignments Puigdollers exercised tangible influence in various areas of public life during early and mid-Francoism. His positions first in Comisión de Cultura y Enseñanza and then in Consejo Superior de Investigaciones Científicas were related to education and science; his role in Asuntos Eclesiásticos department rendered him an important man in relations between the state and the Church; his presence in Consejo Superior de Protección de Menores and other similar boards allowed him to shape penitentiary and redemption system. However, when implementing and shaping the Francoist order he was an administrator and a propagandist rather than a key decision-maker; he has never hold major posts and one scholar named him a “second-row politician”.

Upon the 1943 emergence of the Francoist quasi-parliament, Cortes Españolas, Franco included Puigdollers in the pool of his personal nominees. He kept re-appointing Puigdollers every time the new chamber was assembled, which translated into 8 successive nominations in 1943, 1946, 1949, 1952, 1955, 1958, 1961 and 1964. The last term expired in 1967, yet upon reaching the regular retirement age Puigdollers decided to vacate most positions and in 1965 resigned also his Cortes ticket; he turned out to be one of the longest serving members of the Francoist parliament, with 32 successive years in the chamber. However, little is known of his labors. They were usually related to juridical system, e.g. in 1943 he was noted working on draft of a law on “jurisdicción contencioso-administrativa”, in 1957 on legislative projects related to criminal law, in 1958 on governmental amendments to civil code and in 1963 on setting up Tribunal de Orden Publico.

Order of Isabella the Catholic

Puigdollers enjoyed limited personal access to Franco and a few times was officially reported as admitted by the dictator, e.g. in 1943, 1963 or 1966. Apart from various corporate homages he received throughout his service, Puigdollers was also awarded numerous state honors. In 1942 he received Commander with Plaque of Orden de Isabel La Católica, in 1946 he got Gran Cruz de la Orden del Mérito Civíl, and in 1963 he was honored with Gran Cruz de la Orden de San Raimundo de Peñafort, apart from minor medals and titles like a Medal of Merit from Diputación de Barcelona. When retired he held honorary membership or presidency in various bodies or gatherings, e.g. in 1972 he presided over Jornadas Hispánicas de Derecho Natural. After the Civil War he distanced himself from independent Carlist politics and was not noted as engaged in party structures, though in private he cultivated the Traditionalist link; in the late 1950s he joined Ediciones Montejurra, a newly set Seville-based Carlist publishing house, and at least until the 1960s along with Manuel Senante, Francisco Elías de Tejada, Rafael Gambra and Agustín de Asís Garrote was in its Consejo Asesor. From Traditionalist positions he protested the constitution draft of 1977; as one of 61 academics he called to reject the draft in the referendum. There is no information on his public activity after the date.

== See also ==
- Carlism
- Traditionalism (Spain)
- Carlo-francoism
