= Richard Oliver =

Richard Oliver may refer to:

- Richard Oliver (cricketer) (born 1989), British cricket player
- Richard Oliver (field hockey) (born 1944), British Olympic hockey player
- Richard Oliver (New Zealand politician) (1830–1910), New Zealand politician who represented Dunedin
- Richard Oliver (Paralympian) (born 1955), Australian Paralympic athlete and wheelchair basketball player
- Richard Oliver (priest) (died 1689), Anglican priest
- Richard Oliver (radical) (1735–1784), British merchant, plantation owner and politician
- Richard Philip Oliver (1763–1843), Irish MP for County Limerick
- Richard J Oliver (born 1975), Welsh rock musician, formerly known as Jamie Oliver
- Dick Oliver (1939–2016), American television news reporter
