= Melvin Oliver =

Melvin Oliver may refer to:

- Melvin Oliver (American football), American football defensive end
- Melvin L. Oliver, American academic administrator and professor
- Sy Oliver (Melvin James Oliver), American jazz arranger, trumpeter and bandleader
