= Arthur Oliver =

Arthur Oliver may refer to:

- Arthur Olliver (1916–1988), Australian rules footballer
- Arthur Robert Oliver, New Zealand politician

== See also ==
- Arthur Ollivier (1851–1897), New Zealand businessman
