= Francis Oliver =

Francis Oliver may refer to:

- Francis Oliver (Medal of Honor) (1832–1880), U.S. Army soldier
- Francis Wall Oliver (1864–1951), English botanist
