= Harry Oliver (disambiguation) =

Harry Oliver (1888–1973) was an American humorist, artist and art director.

Harry or Harold Oliver may also refer to:

- Harry Oliver (footballer) (1921–1994), English footballer
- Harry Oliver (ice hockey) (1898–1985), Canadian ice hockey player
- Harold Oliver (Australian footballer) (1891-1958), Australian rules footballer
- Harold Oliver (footballer, born 1863) (1863–?), English footballer

== See also ==
- Henry Oliver (disambiguation)
