= Spencer Oliver =

Spencer Oliver may refer to:

- Spencer Oliver (boxer) (born 1975), English boxer
- R. Spencer Oliver (born 1938), American government staffer and diplomat

== See also ==
- Spencer Oliver Fisher (1843–1919), American politician
