= Alfred Oliver =

Welsh footballer

Personal information
- Date of birth: 15 September 1882
- Place of birth: Wales

International career
Years	Team	Apps	(Gls)
1905	Wales	2	(0)

Alfred Oliver (15 September 1882 – unknown) was a Welsh international footballer. He was part of the Wales national football team, for which he only played two matches. His first match on 6 March 1905 was against Scotland and his last match on 27 March 1905 against England.

== See also ==
- List of Wales international footballers (alphabetical)
