= George Oliver =

George Oliver may refer to:

- George Oliver (footballer) (1883–1964), Australian footballer
- George Oliver (freemason) (1782–1867), English cleric, schoolmaster, topographer and writer on Freemasonry
- George Oliver (golfer) (1883–1965), American Olympic golfer
- George Oliver (historian) (1781–1861), Roman Catholic priest and historian
- George Oliver (physician) (1841–1915), English physician
- George Oliver (politician) (1888–1984), British politician
- George Oliver (rugby) (1891–1977), dual-code international rugby union and rugby league footballer of the 1910s and 1920s
- George K. Oliver, American polo player
- George T. Oliver (1848–1917), U.S. Senator from Pennsylvania
- George Oliver Onions (1873–1961), British writer better known as Oliver Onions
- George Oliver, chairman and CEO of Johnson Controls
