= Adam Oliver =

Adam Oliver may refer to:

- Adam Oliver (footballer) (born 1980), English footballer
- Adam Oliver (politician) (1823–1882), Canadian politician
