= Philip Oliver =

Philip Oliver is the name of:

- Philip Oliver (British politician) (1884–1954), British politician
- Philip Oliver (cricketer) (born 1956), English cricketer
- Philip Oliver (Irish politician) (c. 1720–1768), MP for Kilmallock
- Philip Oliver, one of the Oliver Twins (born 1969), developer of computer games

== See also ==
- Philip Olivier (born 1980), English actor and model
