= Charles Oliver =

Charles or Charlie Oliver may refer to:

- Charles Oliver (died 1706), Irish landowner and MP
- Charles Oliver (actor) (fl. 1936–1941), British actor
- Charles Nicholson Jewel Oliver (1848–1920), Australian sportsman and public servant
- Charles Silver Oliver, Irish landowner and MP
- Charlie Oliver (rugby union) (1905–1977), New Zealand rugby union player and cricketer
- Charlie Oliver (trade unionist) (1901–1990), Australian trade unionist and politician
- Charlie Oliver (English footballer) (born 1997), English footballer
- Charlie Oliver (Australian footballer) (1874–1917), Australian rules footballer
- Charlie Oliver (athlete) (born 1955), middle-distance athlete from the Solomon Islands
