= Ed Oliver =

Ed Oliver may refer to:

- Ed Oliver (American football) (born 1997), American football defensive tackle
- Ed Oliver (golfer) (1915–1961), American golfer
- Ed Oliver (politician), member of the Alabama House of Representatives

== See also ==
- Edward Oliver (disambiguation)
- Edmund Oliver
