= Martin Oliver =

Martin Oliver may refer to:

- Martin Oliver (author), British author of children's books
- Martin Oliver (baseball), American baseball player
- Martin Oliver (captain), captain of the brig, St. John, fl. 1849
- Martin Oliver (Claddagh), sailor and King of the Claddagh, c. 1961–1972

== See also ==
- Martyn Oliver, British education administrator
