= Reggie Oliver =

Reggie Oliver may refer to:

- Reggie Oliver (American football) (1951–2018), American football quarterback and coach
- Reggie Oliver (writer) (born 1952), English playwright, biographer, and writer of ghost stories
