= Admiral Oliver =

Admiral Oliver may refer to:

- David R. Oliver Jr. (born 1941), U.S. Navy rear admiral
- Daniel T. Oliver (born 1945), U.S. Navy vice admiral
- Geoffrey Oliver (1898–1980), British Royal Navy admiral
- Henry Oliver (1865–1965), British Royal Navy admiral
- James Harrison Oliver (1857–1928), British Royal Navy rear admiral
- Robert Don Oliver (1895–1980), British Royal Navy vice admiral
- Robert Dudley Oliver (1766–1850), British Royal Navy admiral

== See also ==
- Manuel Villar Olivera (1801–1889), Peruvian Navy rear admiral
