= William Oliver (physician, 1659–1716) =

English physician

- Born: 1659
- Died: 4 April 1716 (aged 56–57)
- Occupation: Physician

William Oliver (1659 – 4 April 1716) was an English physician.

== Biography ==
Oliver was born in 1659. He belonged to the family of Oliver dwelling at Trevarnoe, in Sithney, Cornwall. He was entered in the physic line at Leyden University on 17 December 1683, when aged 24, but his medical studies were interrupted by his joining the Duke of Monmouth's expedition to England, and serving with the troops as one of their three surgeons (Roberrts, Life of Monmouth, i. 253). After its defeat, he rode off the field with the duke, Lord Grey, and a few others. When they had ridden about twenty miles he proposed to the duke to turn off to the sea-coast of Somerset, seize a passage-boat at Uphill, and cross to Wales. This advice was not adopted, and Oliver rode away to Bristol, about twelve miles distant (Oldmixion, History under the Stuarts, p. 704). There he concealed himself with his friends, and, after the ‘bloody assizes,’ travelled to London with the clerk of Judge Jeffreys, to whom he had been recommended by a tory friend. He then escaped to the continent, and made his way to Holland. In 1685 he was at Königsberg in Prussia, and he spent one winter in the most northern part of Poland; but his name appears again in the list of the students at Leyden on 17 February 1688. He accompanied William III to England in 1688 as an officer in his army, and was soon rewarded for his services. On 30 September 1692 Oliver qualified as a licentiate of the College of Physicians at London, and he held from 27 April 1698 to 1702 the post of physician to the red squadron. This cause him to he with the fleet at Cadiz in 1694, and to spend two summers in the Mediterranean, during which period he eagerly prosecuted his inquiries in medicine and science. Extracts from two letters written by Oliver when with the fleet were communicated by Walter Moyle to the ‘Philosophical Transactions,' xvii. 908-12, and a third letter, written at the same period, was published in the same 'Transactions,’ xxiv. 562–4. A letter ‘on his late journey into Denmark and Holland' about 1701, also appeared in the ‘Philosophical Transactions,’ xxiii. 1400–10. These communications led to his election as F.R.S. on 5 January 1703–4. From 1702 to 1709 he dwelt in London and Bath, his ‘Practical Essay' being dated from ‘Red Lion Court in Fleet Street, July 10, 1704;’ ‘but it is doubtful whether he ever practised at Bath’ (Falconer, Bath Hospital, ed. 1888, p. 11). From 1709 to 1714 he was a physician to the hospital at Chatham for sick and wounded seamen, and from 1714 to 1716 he was physician to the Royal Hospital at Greenwich. He died unmarried at Greenwich on 4 April 1716, and was buried in the abbey church at Bath, where a monument was erected to his memory.

Oliver published in 1704 ‘A practical Essay en Fevers, containing Remarks on the hot and cold Methods of their Cure,' at 202 of which begins ‘a Dissertation on the hot waters of Bathe,' the first draft of his subsequent work. The essay, through its author's references to Dr. Radcliffe, was attacked in ‘A Letter to Dr. Oliver, during him to reconcile some few of the contradictory assertions in his has on Feavers,’ dated from Tunbridge, 25 July 1704. The treatise on Bath was expanded into ‘A Practical Dissertation on Bath Waters; to which is added a Relation of a very extraordinary Sleeper near Bath,’ 1707, 1719; 5th edit. 1764. This account of the sleeper, Samuel Chilton, a labourer at Timsbury, and twenty-five years old, is also in the ‘Philosophical Transactions,' xxiv. 2177-82, and was issued separately in 1707 and 1719. A further communication by him is in the same ‘Transactions,' xxiv. 1596. His rules for health, written for the use of John Smalley of Plymouth, his cousin, and a discourse of ‘Christian and Politike Reasons’ why England and Holland should not war with each other, with other manuscripts, are in the Sloane NS. No. 1770 at the British Museum, and a letter from him to Sir Hans Sloane is in the same collection, No. 4054.
