= Andrew Oliver (disambiguation) =

Andrew Oliver (1706–1774) was a Massachusetts politician.

Andrew Oliver may also refer to:

- Andrew Oliver (1731–1799), jurist and scientist
- Andrew Oliver (New York politician) (1815–1889), U.S. Representative from New York
- Andrew C. Oliver, software developer
- Andy Oliver (Andrew Allen Oliver, born 1987), pitcher for the Pittsburgh Pirates
- Andrew Oliver, one of the Oliver Twins
- Andrew Oliver, the drummer of post-hardcore band I See Stars
- Andrew Oliver (New Zealander) (c. 1984–2025)
- Andrew P. Oliver, American music producer, filmmaker, and entrepreneur
