= Joe Oliver (cricketer) =

English cricketer

Personal information
- Full name: Richard Michael Oliver
- Born: 16 December 1946 (age 79); Exeter, Devon, England
- Nickname: Joe
- Batting: Right-handed
- Role: Wicket-keeper

Domestic team information
- Years: Team
- 1967–1986: Devon

Career statistics
Competition	List A
Matches	3
Runs scored	57
Batting average	–
100s/50s	–/–
Top score	33*
Balls bowled	–
Wickets	–
Bowling average	–
5 wickets in innings	–
10 wickets in match	–
Best bowling	–
Catches/stumpings	2/–
- Source: Cricinfo, 12 February 2011

Richard Michael Oliver also known as Joe (born 16 December 1946) is a former English cricketer. Oliver was a right-handed batsman who fielded primarily as a wicket-keeper. He was born in Exeter, Devon.

Oliver made his debut for Devon in the 1967 Minor Counties Championship against Cornwall. From 1967 to 1985, he represented the county in 43 Championship matches, the last of which came against Buckinghamshire. He made his MCCA Knockout Trophy debut for the county in 1983 against Buckinghamshire. From 1983 to 1986, he represented the county in 4 Trophy matches, the last of which came against Cornwall. Oliver also played List A cricket for Devon at a time when they were permitted to take part in the domestic one-day competition, making his debut in that format against Leicestershire in the 1983 NatWest Trophy. He played 2 further List A matches against Sussex in the 1984 NatWest Trophy and Warwickshire in the 1985 NatWest Trophy. In his 3 List A matches, he scored 55 runs in three unbeaten innings, with a high score of 33*.
