= David Oliver (flautist) =

David Bain Oliver (born 21 July 1972 in Edinburgh – died December 2012 in Gloucestershire) was a Scottish flautist and teacher of flute at Trinity Laban Conservatoire of Music and Dance, formerly Trinity College of Music, London.

Discography includes Sound and Substance and Time Entwined on the Amalie record label and Complete Bolling! on the Claudio record label. In 2011, he was a finalist in The People's Music Awards.
