= Brian Oliver =

Brian Oliver is the name of:

- Brian Oliver (athlete) (1929–2015), Australian 1956 Olympic Games competitor
- Brian Oliver (basketball, born 1968), American former professional basketball player; played college ball at Georgia Tech
- Brian Oliver (basketball, born 1990), American professional basketball player; played college ball at Georgia Tech and Seton Hall (no relation to above)
- Brian Oliver (producer) (born 1971), American film producer
