= General Oliver =

General Oliver may refer to:

- John Morrison Oliver (1828–1872), Union Army brigadier general and brevet major general
- Jovan Oliver (ca. 1310–1356), magnate of the Serbian Emperor Dušan the Mighty
- Lunsford E. Oliver (1889–1978), U.S. Army major general
- Stephen W. Oliver (fl. 1980s–2020s), U.S. Air Force major general
- William Oliver (British Army officer) (1901–1981), British Army lieutenant general
