= Lloyd Oliver =

US Marine Corps Navajo Code Talker (1923–2011)

- Born: April 23, 1923; Shiprock, New Mexico
- Died: March 16, 2011 (aged 87) Avondale, Arizona
- Allegiance: United States
- Branch: United States Marine Corps
- Service years: 1942–1945
- Rank: Corporal
- Awards: Congressional Gold Medal

Lloyd Oliver (April 23, 1923 – March 16, 2011) was an American veteran of the United States Marine Corps and one of the original 29 members of the Navajo Code Talkers during World War II, and the brother of fellow Code Talker Willard Varnell Oliver.

Oliver served from 1942 to 1945, eventually attaining the rank of corporal. His parents were Howard and Olive (Lee) Oliver.

Oliver was awarded the Congressional Gold Medal.
