= Senator Oliver =

Senator Oliver may refer to:

- Allen J. Oliver (1903–1953), New York State Senate
- Charlane Oliver (born 1982), Tennessee State Senate
- Edward C. Oliver (1930–2022), Minnesota State Senate
- George T. Oliver (1848–1917), U.S. Senator from Pennsylvania
- Mary Margaret Oliver (born 1948), Georgia State Senate
- S. Addison Oliver (1833–1912), Iowa State Senate
- William M. Oliver (1792–1863), New York State Senate
