= Rachel Oliver =

Rachel Oliver may refer to:

- Rachel Oliver (footballer) (born 1971), New Zealand footballer
- Rachel Oliver (scientist), British materials scientist
- Rachel Gilmour, British politician, formerly known as Rachel Oliver
