= Robert Oliver =

Robert Oliver may refer to:

- Robert Oliver (canoeist) (born 1988), British Paralympic canoeist
- Robert Oliver (chef), New Zealand chef, raised in Fiji and Samoa
- Robert Oliver (cyclist) (born 1950), New Zealand road and track cyclist
- Robert Oliver (priest) (1710–1784), archdeacon of the East Riding
- Robert Oliver (soldier) (1738–1810), American Revolutionary War lieutenant colonel and politician
- Robert C. Oliver (1902–1966), United States Air Force general
- Robert Don Oliver (1895–1980), British Royal Navy officer
- Robert Dudley Oliver (1766–1850), British Royal Navy officer
- Robert Shaw Oliver (1847–1935), United States assistant secretary of war
- Robert T. Oliver (1909–2000), American author, lecturer, and authority on public speaking
- Robert W. Oliver (1815–1899), first chancellor of the University of Kansas
- Robert Oliver, founding director of Baltimore and Ohio Railroad
- Bob Oliver (Robert Lee Oliver, 1943-2020), American baseball player
- Bob Oliver (American football) (Robert Lee Oliver, 1947–2013), American football player
