= Edward Oliver =

Edward Oliver may refer to:

- Edward C. Oliver (1930–2022), member of the Minnesota Senate
- Edward George Hudson Oliver (born 1938), South African botanist and author
- Ed Oliver (golfer) (1915–1961, Edward Stewart Oliver Jr.), American golfer

== See also ==
- Ed Oliver (disambiguation)
