= Reece Oliver =

British zookeeper

- Other names: Lion King
- Occupations: Animal conservationist, Former show jumper
- Known for: Animal conservation Founder of Strelley Wildlife Conservation Facility

Reece Oliver is a British animal conservationist and former show jumper. He is the founder and operator of the Strelley Wildlife Conservation Facility, based in Nottingham, which provides a home for rescued animals, including lions, squirrel monkeys, wallabies, puma, and various other wildlife species.

In 2021, Oliver was featured in British TV documentaries, Britain's Tiger Kings - On The Trail With Ross Kemp, which aired on ITV and Stacey Dooley Sleeps Over, which aired on W.

== Career and work ==
Reece Oliver is engaged in wildlife conservation work and has collaborated with the Department for Environment, Food and Rural Affairs (Defra) in his efforts. He also provides care for rescued animals. In 2019, Oliver rescued two stolen Humboldt penguins, Pablo and Penny, originally taken from South Lakes Safari Zoo in Cumbria. He assisted the Nottinghamshire Police in returning stolen penguins.

In February 2019, Oliver rescued lion cubs named Rocky and Rora from a circus in the Czech Republic, housing them in a big cat enclosure alongside his Canadian puma named Rogue, who was rescued from the illegal pet trade in Lincolnshire. In June 2019, Broxtowe Borough Council permitted him to maintain custody of these animals, despite initial objections from some councilors and residents of Strelley. The charity Born Free Foundation, which had offered to oversee the care of the lions, expressed criticism of the decision.

He rescued a Canadian puma as a cub from the illegal pet trade in Lincolnshire and he also houses 27 monkeys in his private collection. He also owns a South American tapir named Mr. T, who he rescued from Germany after the animal was abandoned by its family.

Reece Oliver expanded his enclosure to 1,000 square meters after obtaining approval from Broxtowe Borough Council in March 2021. The enclosure in Strelley is currently considered to be on par with some of the largest lion enclosures found in British zoos. Subsequently, in September 2021, the council granted permission for the construction of a new lion's den, an enclosure extension and the addition of a stable extension.

Multiple petitions have been filed against Oliver, advocating for a ban on the ownership of wild and dangerous animals as pets. In response to one such petition, Oliver stated, "He does not keep his lions because he wants cuddly lions as pets; he rescued them. He meets zoo-standard requirements and holds DEFRA approval. Privately keeping animals is permissible and they are no different from a zoo."

In March 2023, Freedom for Animals submitted a petition on Change.org, urging Broxtowe Council to reject Reece Oliver's plan for a new zoo on greenbelt land in Trowell, Nottinghamshire, citing concerns about potential adverse effects on animals, the environment and the local community if the project proceeds.

== Personal life ==
He lives in Strelley, Nottingham. In an interview with the Nottingham Post, he attributed his love for animals to his childhood experience of watching David Attenborough.

== Controversies ==
In May 2019, a 16-year-old girl was attacked by Oliver's Canadian puma, when she entered the enclosure without adequate protection. This incident raised concerns about safety and security among the residents. The video footage of the incident went viral on the internet, leading to an investigation by Broxtowe Borough Council's environmental health team.

In February 2023, members of the University of Nottingham's Vegetarian and Vegan Society, known as VegSoc, joined Animal Rebellion campaigners protested against Reece Oliver's proposed Broxtowe Retreat, an animal sanctuary project located in Trowell. The demonstration occurred outside the offices of Broxtowe Borough Council in Beeston, with the intent of urging the councilors to reject the project.

== In popular culture ==
In March 2021, he was featured in Ross Kemp's television documentary Britain's Tiger Kings - On The Trail With Ross Kemp, a series inspired by Netflix's true crime documentary Tiger King. It aired on ITV.

In 2021, Reece Oliver and his story were featured in the second season of the documentary television series, Stacey Dooley Sleeps Over, hosted by Stacey Dooley, which aired on W.
