= William Oliver (artist, born 1804) =

English Victorian landscape painter

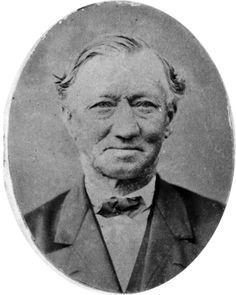
- Born: 1804; Sudbury, Suffolk, England
- Died: 2 November 1853 (aged 48–49); Langley Mill House, Halstead, Essex, England
- Occupation: Artist

William Oliver (1804–1853) was an English landscape artist who painted in oils but chiefly in watercolours, painting views in England, France, Spain, Italy, Switzerland, Germany and the Tyrol, being especially fond of the Pyrenees. He was not related to William Oliver Williams (1823–1901) who also used the professional name of William Oliver.

== Life and family ==
Oliver was born about 1804 in Sudbury, Suffolk. In 1840 he married his former student Emma Sophia Eburne (1820–1885) and they had two children: William Redivious Oliver (1843–1908) and Emma Caroline Oliver (1844–1903). Oliver died on 2 November 1853 at Langley Mill House, Halstead, Essex. The death certificate gave the cause of death as 'hypertrophy of the heart'.

== Career ==
Oliver began to exhibit in 1829 when he sent to the Society of British Artists (now the Royal Society of British Artists) A Beach Scene in Kent and Fish Boat. During the period 1829–1852 he exhibited over 30 works at this venue, with finally, in 1852, the three paintings On the Lahn near Oberlahnstein near the Rhine; View of the Environs of Perugia, Tiber in the Distance, Papal States, Italy; and Lahneck Castle, from Oberlahnstein on the Lahn, Duchy of Nassau.

In 1834 he was elected a full member of the New Society (now the Royal Institute) of Painters in Water-Colours. His drawings appeared annually until 1854.

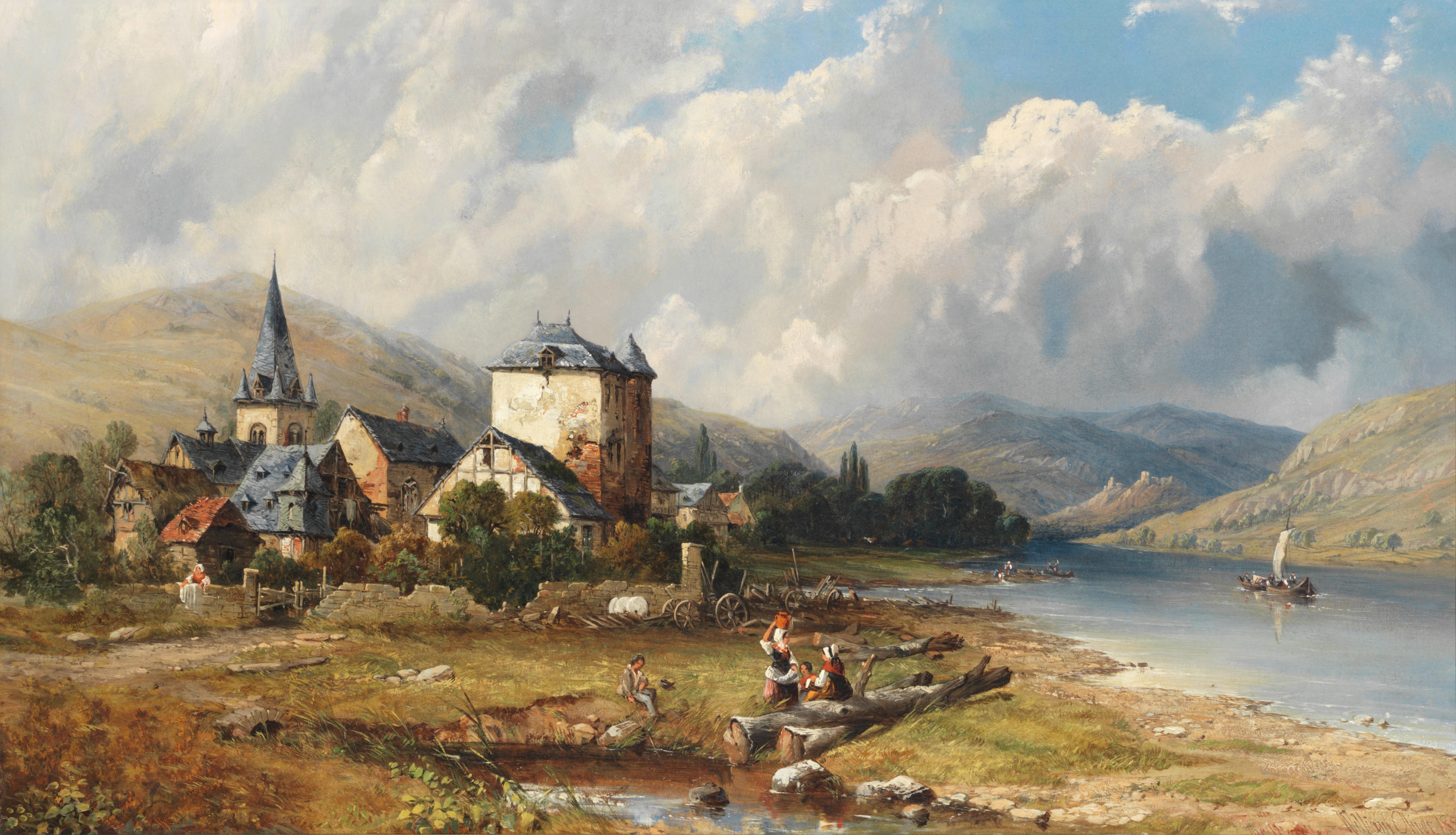
The Moselle. Oil on canvas. Signed, dated and inscribed 'William Oliver 1852, The Moselle' (lower right).

Oliver exhibited 54 works at the British Institution during the period 1835–1855.In 1853 he exhibited a painting 'Two Convents on the outskirts of the town of Narni, Papal States, L'Ospitale de Buoni Fratelli and Conventuale di Cappoinari priced at £66 13s 6d (equivalent to about £9000 in 2022). At the Royal Academy he exhibited 32 paintings starting with View on the Saône France and At Perigeux France in 1835, and concluding with Bridge over the torrent of the Passeyer Bach at Meray, Tyrol and View of the River Moselle near Pommera in 1853. It is possible that the titles of the exhibited paintings of views in countries with different languages may have contained some translation errors.

In 1842 he published a portfolio volume of Scenery of the Pyrenees lithographed by George Barnard, Thomas Shotter Boys, Carl Hughe, and others.

William Oliver's views of foreign places were popular at the time. The Victoria and Albert Museum possesses his oil painting of the Italian town of Foligno, the Tate Museum has four of his pencil drawings of locations in France and Germany and the Royal Collection Trust has his oil painting A view of Remagen which was purchased by Prince Albert.

In 1853, The Art Journal published the following obituary:

The New Society of Painters in Watercolours lost one of its most industrious members in this artist, who died on November the 2nd, in his forty-ninth year. His landscapes, chiefly of foreign scenery both in oil and watercolours, found many admirers, and not undeservedly so, but he painted too much to rise to the highest position in his art, although possessed of talent, which, had it been nurtured, would have elevated him far above the rank that his pictures now hold.

This suggested that a high productivity, putting quantity before quality, may have limited the potential prices he could have achieved for his work. Surprisingly this contrasted with the following praise The Art Journal gave to one of his last two paintings that he exhibited at the Royal Academy in 1853.

No. 1280. 'Bridge over the Torrent of the Passeyer Bach at Merar-Tyrol,' W. OLIVER. This picture contains some masterly manipulation, it is a striking subject carried out with very fine feeling; the best production we remember to have exhibited under this name.

The local press tended to be more consistently positive in their comments. The Liverpool Mercury reported on Oliver's submissions to the Liverpool Academy Exhibition that was held in December 1853, just a month after his death: "William Oliver, lately deceased, has several pictures in his spirited and lively style, which are now, we suppose, considerably increased in value." In the previous year the Bristol Mercury gave a detailed, almost poetic, description of Oliver's painting titled Carden on the Moselle that he submitted to the Bristol Academy of Fine Arts. Exhibition of Works of Living Masters:

A charming little picture, full of subject, fresh as the face of Nature itself. A portion of a village, backed by a range of hills, is seen skirting the 'blue Moselle'. Some buildings and trees give strength to the foreground, while stretching out into the aerial perspective is a chain of those lofty mountains which grace the banks of that beautiful river. The arrangement of the subject is artistic, the colouring rich and brilliant, and the objects are manipulated with the skill of a master.

Oliver's wife was also an artist and, like her husband, exhibited at the British Institution, the Society of British Artists and the Royal Academy. After Oliver's death she travelled further afield than when he was alive, often painting in foreign locations that he had previously visited. She remarried, in about 1856, to John Sedgewick, a solicitor of Watford, Hertfordshire, but continued to follow her profession in her first husband's name until her death at the Brewer's House, Berkhamstead, on 5 March 1885. She was elected an associate member of the New Society of Painters in Water-Colours in 1849 but was not made a full member until the year of her death.

Their son William Redivious Oliver exhibited two watercolours at the Society of British Artists. They were Rydal Water, Westmorland-Sunshine through the mist after rain in 1861 and Ben Voilich from Rob Roy's cave, Loch Lomond in 1862. William Redivious Oliver, however, did not pursue a possible career as an artist. Instead he established himself as a remarkable and colourful minor celebrity and socialite. During this process he seemed to change his middle name to Redivivus and eventually called himself "The Marquis de Leuville".
