= Henry Oliver (disambiguation) =

Henry Oliver (1865–1965) was a British naval officer.

Henry Oliver may also refer to:

- Henry Oliver (athlete) (1902–1995), British middle-distance runner
- Harry Oliver (footballer) (Henry Spoors Oliver, 1921–1994), English footballer
- Henry Oliver (MP), MP for Bedford
- Henry K. Oliver (1800–1885), Massachusetts politician
- Henry W. Oliver (1840–1904), American industrialist
- Henry Oliver, New Zealand journalist and former member of Die! Die! Die!

== See also ==
- Harry Oliver (disambiguation)
- Oliver Henry (disambiguation)
