= Frank Oliver =

Frank Oliver may refer to:

- Frank Oliver (American football) (born 1952), American football player
- Frank Oliver (footballer) (1882–?), English footballer
- Frank Oliver (politician) (1853–1933), Canadian politician
- Frank Oliver (rugby union) (1948–2014), New Zealand rugby player
- Frank A. Oliver (1883–1968), U.S. Representative from New York
- Frank L. Oliver (1922–2018), Pennsylvania State House Representative
- One of the two fictional comic book characters to use the name Kangaroo
