= Daniel Oliver (physician) =

American physician

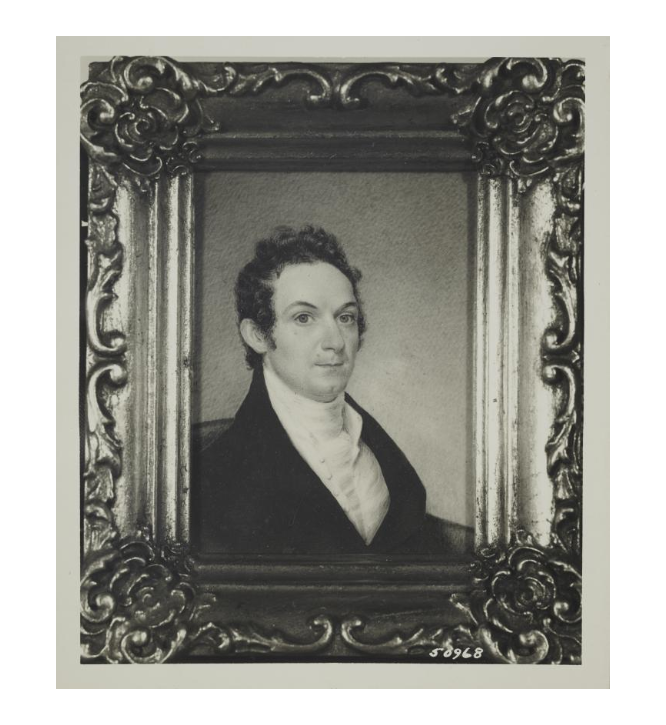
- Born: 1787; Marblehead
- Died: 1 June 1842 (aged 54–55)

Daniel Oliver (9 September 1787 – 1 June 1842) was an American medical doctor.

Oliver was born in Marblehead, Massachusetts, 9 September 1787; died in Cambridge, Massachusetts, 1 June 1842, was the son of Reverend Thomas Fitch Oliver and the great grandson of Andrew Oliver. He was graduated at Harvard in 1806, and at the medical department of the University of Pennsylvania in 1810. He practiced for many years at Salem, Massachusetts, lectured on chemistry at Dartmouth in 1815–16, and in 1820 removed to Hanover, New Hampshire, having been appointed professor of the theory and practice of medicine, and of materia medica and therapeutics. In 1827–28 he lectured on the theory and practice of medicine at Bowdoin. In 1828 he took the chair also of intellectual philosophy at Dartmouth. He resigned his professorships in that college in 1837, and in 1841–42 was a professor in the medical college at Cincinnati, Ohio. Dr. Oliver was a man of varied erudition, familiar with French and German, as well as the classical languages. He received the degree of LL.D. from Hobart in 1838. His only important publication was First Lines of Physiology (Boston, 1835).
