= Maggie Oliver =

Maggie Oliver can mean:

- Maggie Oliver (actor) (1844–1892), Australian actress and comedian
- Maggie Toulouse Oliver (born c. 1976), American politician
- Margaret Oliver, former British police officer and whistleblower
