= Willard Varnell Oliver =

Navajo code talker (1921–2009)

- Born: May 2, 1921; New Mexico, U.S.
- Died: October 14, 2009 (aged 88); Prescott, Arizona, U.S.
- Relatives: Lloyd Oliver (brother)
- Military career
- Allegiance: United States
- Branch: United States Marine Corps
- Service years: 1943–1945
- Units: Navajo Code Talkers, 2nd Marine Division
- Conflicts: World War II

Willard Varnell Oliver (May 2, 1921 – October 14, 2009) was an American veteran of the United States Marine Corps and a member of the Navajo Code Talkers during World War II. Oliver was part of a unit of Navajos who worked to confuse Japanese forces in the Pacific during World War II through the transmission of messages in the Navajo language. His younger brother, Lloyd Oliver, was also a member of the Navajo Code Talkers. Their parents were Howard and Olive (Lee) Oliver.

Oliver grew up in a rural area between Shiprock and Farmington, New Mexico, and graduated from the Shiprock Agricultural High School in 1940. He enlisted in the United States Marine Corps on March 23, 1943, and served with the 2nd Marine Division. He was honorably discharged on December 11, 1945.

Willard Oliver died on October 14, 2009, at the Northern Arizona Veterans Affairs Health Care System Hospital in Prescott, Arizona, at the age of 88. He was the fifth member of the Navajo Code Talkers to die since May 2009.

Navajo President Joe Shirley Jr. ordered that American flags on the Navajo Nation be lowered to half staff in Oliver's honor. His funeral was held on October 17, 2009, in his hometown of Lukachukai, Arizona.
