= Paul Oliver (disambiguation) =

Paul Oliver (1927–2017) was an English architectural historian.

Paul Oliver may also refer to:

- Paul Oliver (American football) (1984–2013), American football player
- Paul Ambrose Oliver (1831–1912), American explosives inventor
- Paul M. Oliver, Australian herpetologist
