= Juan Oliver =

Juan Oliver may refer to:

- Juan Fremiot Torres Oliver (1925–2012), Puerto Rican bishop
- Juan García Oliver (1901–1980), Spanish revolutionary
- Juan Martínez Oliver (born 1962), Spanish cyclist
