= Eric Oliver (footballer) =

English footballer

Personal information
- Full name: Eric Oliver
- Date of birth: 8 July 1940 (age 86)
- Place of birth: Spennymoor, England
- Position: Goalkeeper

Senior career*
Years	Team	Apps	(Gls)
- West Auckland Town
1963–1964	Darlington	2	(0)
- West Auckland Town
- * Club domestic league appearances and goals

Eric Oliver (born 8 July 1940) is an English former amateur footballer who played as a goalkeeper in the Football League for Darlington and in non-league football for West Auckland Town.
