= Stuart Oliver (cricketer) =

Australian cricketer (born 1972)

Stuart Bradley Oliver (born 20 March 1972 in Launceston, Tasmania) is an Australian former cricketer who played for the Tasmanian Tigers.

He attended the Australian Cricket Academy in 1990, and played both first-class and List A cricket for the Tigers from 1991, until 1996, but never managed to get a permanent spot in the side.
