= Leonard Oliver =

Leonard Oliver or Len Oliver may refer to:

- Leonard Oliver (cricketer) (1886–1948), English cricketer
- Len Oliver (footballer) (1905–67), English international footballer
- Len Oliver (soccer), U.S. soccer half back

== See also ==
- Leonard Olivier (born 1923), American bishop
- Len Olivier (born 1986), South African rugby union player
