= Josefina Oliver =

Argentine diarist and photographer

Josefina Oliver (1875–1956) was an Argentine diarist and photographer. She was born in the town of Caballito, to a family of Spanish immigrants from Mallorca. Leaving school at 14, she started keeping a diary from the age of 16. She kept it up for more than 60 years, leaving behind 20 volumes of her journals. She was also a self-taught photographer and took more than 2,600 photographs. These have been exhibited posthumously in her native Argentina.

She was married to Pepe Salas, with whom she had several children. She died in Buenos Aires in 1956.
