= Peter Oliver =

Peter Oliver may refer to:

- Peter Oliver, Baron Oliver of Aylmerton (1921–2007), British judge
- Peter Oliver (footballer) (born 1948), Scottish footballer
- Peter Oliver (loyalist) (1713–1791), justice in the Colony of Massachusetts and loyalist during the American Revolution
- Peter Oliver (painter) (1594–1648), English miniaturist
- Peter Oliver (theatre director) (1926–2007), British actor and theatre director
- Peter Oliver, former member of pop group The New Seekers

== See also ==
- Peter Oliva, Canadian novelist
