= Ben Oliver (disambiguation) =

Ben Oliver is a British comics artist.

Ben Oliver may also refer to:

- Ben Oliver (athlete) (born 1995), English athlete in wheelchair racing
- Ben Oliver (cricketer) (born 1979), Australian cricketer
- Ben Oliver (cyclist), New Zealand racing cyclist
- Ben Oliver (criminal), English criminal and first person to have a televised sentencing hearing in England
