= Neil Oliver (disambiguation) =

Neil Oliver (born 1967) is a Scottish historian.

Neil Oliver may also refer to:

- Neil Oliver (footballer) (born 1967), English footballer
- Neil Oliver (politician) (1933–2019), Australian politician
