= Norman Oliver (rugby league) =

English rugby league footballer

Playing information
Club
Years	Team	Pld	T	G	FG	P
1965–70	Hull FC	105	35	0	0	105
1968–68/69	Featherstone Rovers	3	0	0	0	0
	Total	108	35	0	0	105

Norman "Nobby" Oliver is a former professional rugby league footballer who played in the 1960s and 1970s. He played at club level for Hull FC and Featherstone Rovers.

== Club career ==
Norman Oliver made his début for Hull F.C. on Saturday 11 September 1965 and for Featherstone Rovers on Saturday 26 October 1968.
