= Terry Oliver =

Australian cricketer and coach (born 1963)

Terrence Glenn Oliver (born 16 March 1963 in Maryborough) is an Australian cricket coach.

Before becoming a coach, Oliver had represented Queensland Country at the National Country Championships on 5 occasions. He was part of the Australia Country team in 1989-90 and 1992–93 and played for the Gold Coast District Cricket Club in its inaugural season in Queensland Premier Cricket in 1990-91.

His first post playing role was as Queensland's Cricket Development Officer for Central Queensland. In the 1997–98 season he coached the Queensland Country team in the National Championships and did so until 2000 when he was appointed coach of the Australia Country team. After moving to Brisbane in 2000 he became assistant coach of the Queensland Bulls, behind Bennett King.

He became coach of Queensland in 2002, leading them to victory in the 2005-06 Pura Cup after being runners up the previous 3 seasons.
