= Liviero =

Liverani
Origin
- Meaning: from French surname, Olivier. Livièro and Liviero themselves are the variants of Olivièri and Olivieri. Olivier was derived from oliva (olive).
- Region of origin: Italy

Other names
- Variant forms: Olivièri, Olivieri, (and other variants of Olivieri: Livièri, Liverani, Ulivieri, Vièri, Vieri etc.)

Liviero is an Italian surname. Notable people with the surname include:

- Dino Liviero (1938–1970), Italian cyclist
- Matteo Liviero (born 1993), Italian footballer
