= Oliver =

Oliver may refer to:

== Arts and entertainment ==
=== Music ===
- Oliver (singer) (1945–2000), American pop singer best known for the hit song "Good Morning Starshine"
- Oliver (DJs), an electronic music production and DJ duo based in Los Angeles
- Oliver!, a 1960 musical by Lionel Bart based on Dickens' novel Oliver Twist
  - Oliver! (original Broadway cast recording), a 1962 album containing a recording of the above musical
- Oliver! (film), a 1968 musical by Carol Reed based on the stage musical
  - Oliver! (soundtrack), the soundtrack to the film
- Oliver EP, released by Irish singer-songwriter Gemma Hayes in 2008
- Oliver (software), an English-speaking Vocaloid by PowerFX who was released for Vocaloid 3
- "Oliver!" (song), a 1960 song from the stage musical Oliver!
- "Oliver" (song), a 1979 song by Anita Skorgan

=== Other uses in arts and entertainment ===
- "Oliver", an episode of The Good Doctor
- Oliver (Top Gear), nickname for a car in Top Gear: Botswana Special

== Businesses ==
- Oliver Farm Equipment Company, an American farm equipment manufacturer (1929–1960)
- Oliver Typewriter Company, an American typewriter manufacturer (1895–1926)
- Oliver Winery, Bloomington, Indiana, United States

== People and fictional characters ==
- Oliver (given name), including a list of people and fictional characters
- Oliver (surname), including a list of people and fictional characters
- Oliver (Scottish surname), associated with a Scottish sept

== Places ==
=== Canada ===
- Oliver, Edmonton, Alberta, an urban neighborhood west of downtown Edmonton, now known as Wîhkwêntôwin
- Oliver, British Columbia, a small town
- Oliver, Nova Scotia, a town
- Oliver, Essex County, Ontario, a town
- Oliver Glacier, Baffin Island, Nunavut

=== United States ===
- Oliver, Arkansas, an unincorporated community
- Oliver, Georgia, a city
- Oliver, Edgar County, Illinois, an unincorporated community
- Oliver, Indiana, an unincorporated community
- Oliver, Baltimore, Maryland, a neighborhood
- Oliver, Nebraska, an unincorporated community
- Oliver, Pennsylvania, a census-designated place
- Oliver, Wisconsin, a village
- Oliver County, North Dakota
- Oliver Street, Baltimore, Maryland
- Oliver Township (disambiguation)
- Lake Oliver, a reservoir in Georgia and Alabama
- Lake Oliver (South Dakota)

=== Elsewhere ===
- Oliver Island (Antarctica)
- Oliver Island (Western Australia)

== Schools ==
- Oliver High School, Pittsburgh, Pennsylvania, United States
- Oliver School (1892–1969), Winchester, Kentucky, United States
- Oliver Elementary School (disambiguation)

== Other uses ==
- Oliver (chimpanzee), former performing ape
- Oliver Bridge, a railroad bridge that connects Oliver, Wisconsin, with Duluth, Minnesota

== See also ==
- Olivier (disambiguation)
