= Liverani =

Origin
- Meaning: from French surname, Olivier. Liverani itself is the variant of Olivièri and Olivieri. Olivier was derived from oliva (olive).
- Region of origin: Italy

Other names
- Variant forms: Olivièri, Olivieri, (and other variants of Olivieri: Livièri, Livièro, Ulivieri, Vièri, Vieri etc.)

Liverani is an Italian surname, may refer to:

- Andrea Liverani (born 1990), Italian paralympic shooter
- Augusto Liverani (1895–1945), Italian politician
- Fabio Liverani (born 1976), Italian football player and coach
- Luca Liverani (born 1989), Italian football player
- Mario Liverani (born 1939), Italian historian
- Massimo Liverani (born 1961), Italian rally driver
- Maurizio Liverani (1928–2021), Italian journalist, filmmaker, and writer
