= Olivier =

Olivier is the French form of the given name Oliver. It may refer to:

== People and characters ==
- Olivier (given name), a list of people and fictional characters
- Olivier (surname), a list of people
- Baron Olivier (disambiguation)
- Baroness Olivier
- Lady Olivier
- Lord Olivier
- Olivier (comics), a Marvel Comics character, a foe of the Punisher

== Places ==
- Château Olivier, a Bordeaux winery
- Olivier, Louisiana, a rural populated place in the United States
- Olivier (crater), on the Moon
- The Olivier Theatre (named after the actor Laurence Olivier), one of three auditoria at the Royal National Theatre, London, England, UK
- Villa des Oliviers, el Biar, Algeria

== Other uses ==
- Olivier salad, a popular dish of Russian cuisine
- Olivier (novel), the first published novel by French author Claire de Duras
- The Laurence Olivier Awards, a British theatrical award

== See also ==
- Olivier, Olivier, a 1992 drama film
- Claude-Marie-Louis-Emmanuel Carbon de Flins Des Oliviers (1757–1806), French playwright
- Oliver (disambiguation)
- Olive (disambiguation)
- Oliveri (surname)
- Oliveri
