= Lady Olivier =

Lady Olivier may refer to:

- Vivien Leigh, second wife of Laurence Olivier, Baron Olivier
- Joan Plowright, third wife of Laurence Olivier, Baron Olivier
- Margaret Cox, wife of Sydney Olivier, 1st Baron Olivier

== See also ==
- Lord Olivier
- Baron Olivier (disambiguation)
- Olivier (disambiguation)
