= Magic & Bird: A Courtship of Rivals =

- Written by: Charles Olivier
- Directed by: Ezra Edelman
- Starring: Magic Johnson; Larry Bird
- Narrated by: Liev Schreiber
- Theme music composer: Gary Lionelli
- Country of origin: United States
- Original language: English

Production
- Producers: Ezra Edelman; Rick Bernstein; Ross Greenburg; Joe Lavine; Rahul Rohatgi
- Editor: Charles Olivier
- Running time: 85 minutes

Original release
- Network: HBO
- Release: March 10, 2010

Magic & Bird: A Courtship of Rivals is a 2010 television documentary film broadcast on HBO. The film chronicles the rivalry between Magic Johnson and Larry Bird that began with the 1979 NCAA Basketball Championship Game and lasted throughout their Hall of Fame careers in the NBA. The film makes an argument that without the massive media attention that was placed on the rivalry that Johnson and Bird had, the NBA might not have made it through the 1980s following the merger with the ABA, among other things.

HBO Sports President Ross Greenburg stated that the documentary was partly inspired by the book When the Game Was Ours by Jackie MacMullan.

== Synopsis ==
Earvin "Magic" Johnson and Larry Bird were rivals on the basketball court but unlikely friends off of it. After Johnson's Michigan State Spartans defeated Bird's Indiana State Sycamores in the 1979 NCAA championship game, Johnson would be drafted first in the 1979 NBA draft by the Los Angeles Lakers. Bird had been selected as an underclassman by the Boston Celtics at the #6 spot in the 1978 draft, but opted to play his senior season at Indiana State before signing the richest rookie contract to that time in a team sport. Bird captured "Rookie of the Year" in 1980, while Johnson's Lakers won the NBA Championship and Johnson was named NBA Finals MVP. The Celtics took the championship in 1981, the Lakers took it back in 1982. The Celtics would win again in 1984 and 1986, while the Lakers would win the title in 1985, 1987, and 1988. The careers of both men were cut short, Johnson by his diagnosis with HIV and Bird by a debilitating back injury.

This HBO Films documentary follows the two men from the early days of their rivalry up through their present day friendship. Ezra Edelman captures a variety of interviews ranging from family members such as Johnson's sister Evelyn and Bird's brother Mark, sportscasters such as Steve Springer and Charlie Pierce to NBA players such as Kevin McHale, Cedric Maxwell, Michael Cooper and coach Pat Riley.

The film also explores the deep racial issues as a major part of the rivalry between both Magic and Bird and the Lakers and Celtics generally. Bird was often nicknamed "The Great White Hope," which he despised.

== Awards ==
- 2010: Peabody Award Winner

== See also ==
- Magic/Bird
- Celtics/Lakers: Best of Enemies
- Celtics-Lakers rivalry
