= Vieri (name) =

Origin
- Meaning: From French patronymic surname Olivier or directly as the short form of Olivieri; both derived from oliva (olive)
- Region of origin: Italy

Other names
- Variant forms: Olivieri, Liverani, Ulivieri, etc.

Vieri is an Italian surname and male given name. Notable people with the name include:

- Christian Vieri (born 1973), Italian footballer, son of Roberto
- Francesco de Vieri (1524–1591), also called Verino the Second, Italian philosopher
- Lido Vieri (born 1939), Italian football player and manager
- Max Vieri (born 1978), Australian footballer, son of Roberto
- Roberto Vieri (born 1946), Italian footballer
- Ugolino di Vieri (poet) (1438–1516), Italian poet and notary
- Ugolino di Vieri (sculptor) (fl. 1328–1380), Italian sculptor and goldsmith
- Vieri Benci (born 1949), Italian mathematician
- Vieri de' Medici (1323–1395), Italian banker
- Vieri Tosatti (1920–1999), Italian composer

== See also ==
- Viera
- Vieira
- Oliveira (surname)
- Oliver (given name)
