= Brooklyn Dodgers: Ghosts of Flatbush =

Brooklyn Dodgers: The Ghosts of Flatbush
- Written by: Aaron Cohen; Charles Olivier
- Produced by: Ezra Edelman; Amani Martin
- Narrated by: Liev Schreiber
- Cinematography: Samuel Painter
- Edited by: Charles Olivier; Jason Schmidt
- Music by: Gary Lionelli
- Distributed by: HBO
- Release date: July 11, 2007
- Running time: 120 min.
- Country: United States
- Language: English

Brooklyn Dodgers: Ghosts of Flatbush is a 2007 documentary film produced by HBO Sports chronicling the last ten years of the Brooklyn Dodgers' tenure in the borough of churches. The film documents how in 1947 Jackie Robinson broke the baseball racial barrier in previously segregated major league, the struggles to win what seemed an unreachable World Series title in 1955, and the issues and community feelings involved in the team's sudden departure to Los Angeles after the 1957 campaign.

The documentary focuses on the Brooklyn community's identification with the ball club, and with the perennial "wait till next year" attitude of both players and fans associated with the Dodgers' repeated inability to defeat the "upper class" New York Yankees for the World Series title, despite winning several pennants. The Brooklyn players, many of whom lived within and held off-season jobs in the community, were identified with the working-class people. The film portrays the countless agonies, defeats, prayers and tension leading to the World Series title in 1955.

President and general manager Branch Rickey is attributed with the development of the club through his baseball acumen and experience, and several of his innovations, such as the farm system, pitching machines, batting cages, and his decision to integrate the team. Rickey manages some Brooklyn players' resistance to integration and prepares Jackie Robinson for the portrayed shocking reactions from other teams and fans. Jackie's widow Rachel Robinson also discusses these trying times from the Robinsons' point of view. Robinson must pass through a period of isolation prior to being accepted.

Walter O'Malley gains majority ownership of the team and then, following Rickey's departure, total control. With the mass movement of paying fans to the suburbs, inadequate parking and the outdated and dilapidated Ebbets Field leads to O'Malley's failed attempts to convince the power broker Robert Moses, New York City Construction Coordinator, to condemn an O'Malley's chosen Brooklyn property, nearer to transportation infrastructure, for the purpose of building a new geodesic domed stadium. During their last two years in Brooklyn, O'Malley even had the Dodgers play several games each year at Roosevelt Stadium in Jersey City, New Jersey to force Moses to acquiesce and allow a new stadium to be built.

Moses planned to build a stadium at an alternative location in Queens, that eventually came to fruition in the form of Shea Stadium. The failure to reach an agreement, and offers from the municipality of Los Angeles, leads to New York's loss not only of the Dodgers. O'Malley convinces majority owner, Horace Stoneham of their perennial rival New York Giants, to also move to the west coast. The film records several of Brooklyn's old fans demonizing O'Malley, whose decision to move the team gains him a free grant of 350 acres within the city of Los Angeles, where he builds his dream stadium & prospers.

The documentary omits Don Larson's Perfect Game in the 1956 World Series, as well as Roy Camapanella's automobile accident in 1958, which left him paralyzed from the shoulders down.

Former players, front office personnel and Brooklyn residents (including Larry King and Louis Gossett Jr.) provide commentary on the times and what it was like to be alive in the borough during New York's "Golden Age" of baseball. The film was dedicated to former Dodgers pitcher Clem Labine, who died shortly after production of the film was completed.

== Individuals who appeared during the documentary ==
Former Dodgers: Carl Erskine, Duke Snider, Johnny Podres, Clem Labine, Ralph Branca, Buzzie Bavasi (General Manager), Peter O'Malley (former president and son of Walter O'Malley), Joan Hodges (widow of Gil Hodges), Rachel Robinson (widow of Jackie Robinson).
