= Oliver Elementary School =

Oliver Elementary School may refer to:

- Oliver Elementary School (Kentucky), Winchester, Kentucky
- EE Oliver School, Fairview, Alberta, Canada
- School District 53 Okanagan Similkameen, a school district with its board office located in Oliver, British Columbia, Canada
