= Nicolas Thomas Barthe =

French poet and playwright (1734–1785)

Nicolas-Thomas Barthe (1734, Marseille – 17 June 1785, Paris) was an 18th-century French poet and playwright.

== Works ==
Theatre

- 1764: L'Amateur, one-act comedy in verse, Paris, Hôtel de Richelieu, 1 March
- 1768: Les Fausses Infidélités, one-act comedy in verse, Paris, Théâtre de la rue des Fossés Saint-Germain, 25 January, Text online
- 1771: La Mêre jalouse, three-act comedy in verse, Paris, Salle des machines, 23 December, Text online
- 1778: L'Homme personnel, five-act comedy in verse, Paris, Comédie-Française, 21 February

Varia

- 1762: Épîtres sur divers sujets, Text online
- 1766: Lettre de l'abbé de Rancé à un ami, écrite de son abbaye de la Trappe, par M. Barthe, Text online
- 1769: La Jolie femme, ou la Femme du jour, Text online
- 1779: Théâtre complet et œuvres diverses, Text online
- 1810: Choix de poésies by Nicolas Thomas Barthe and Claude-Marie-Louis-Emmanuel Carbon de Flins Des Oliviers
- 1811: Œuvres choisies, Text online

== Sources ==
- Notice sur la vie et les ouvrages de Barthe in Œuvres choisies de Barthe, Firmin Didot, Paris, 1811, (p. 15-13)
- Philippe Le Bas, L'Univers. France : dictionnaire encyclopédique, Firmin Didot, Paris, 1840-1845, t. 2, (p. 159)
