= Celtics/Lakers: Best of Enemies =

2017 documentary film about the NBA rivalry

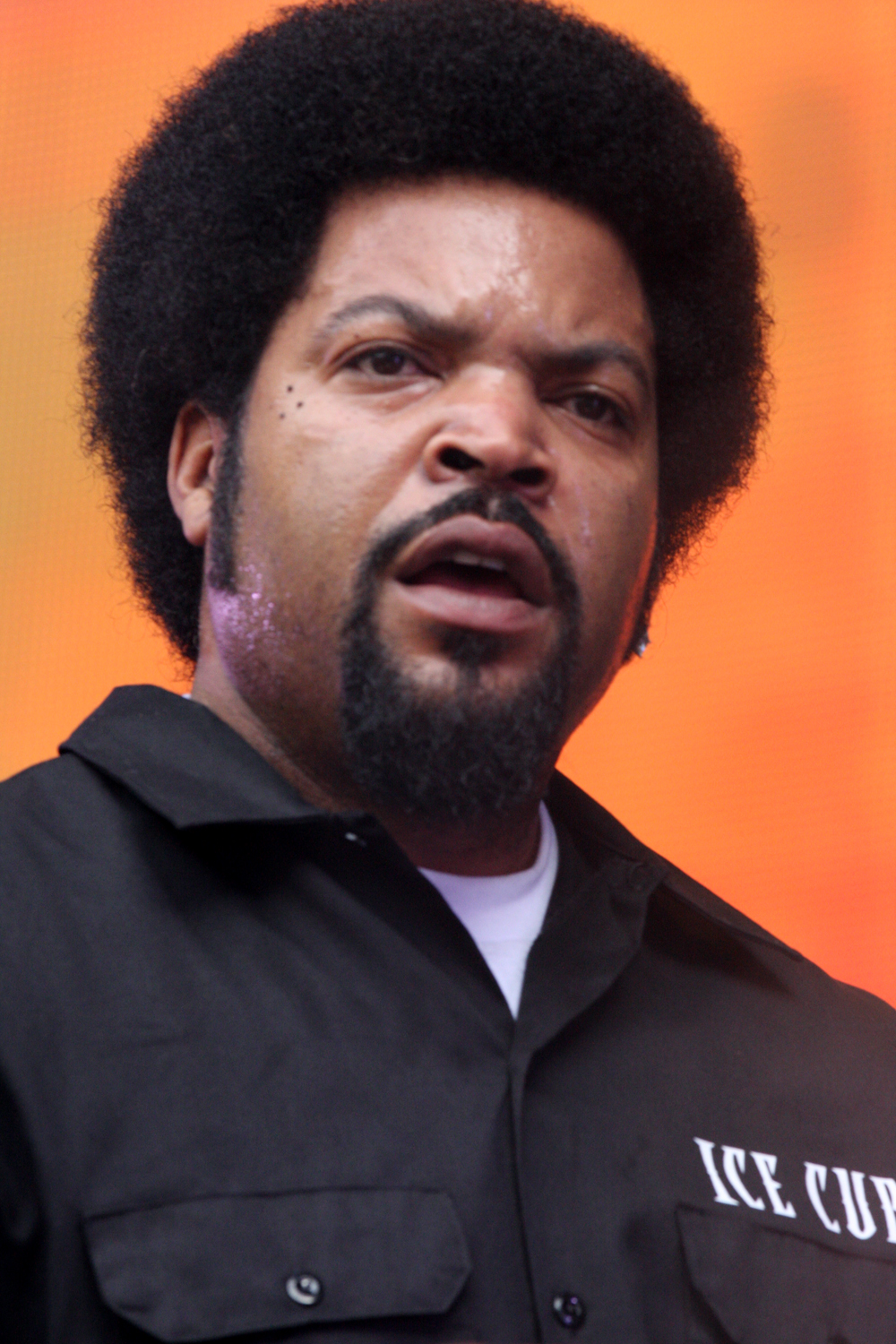
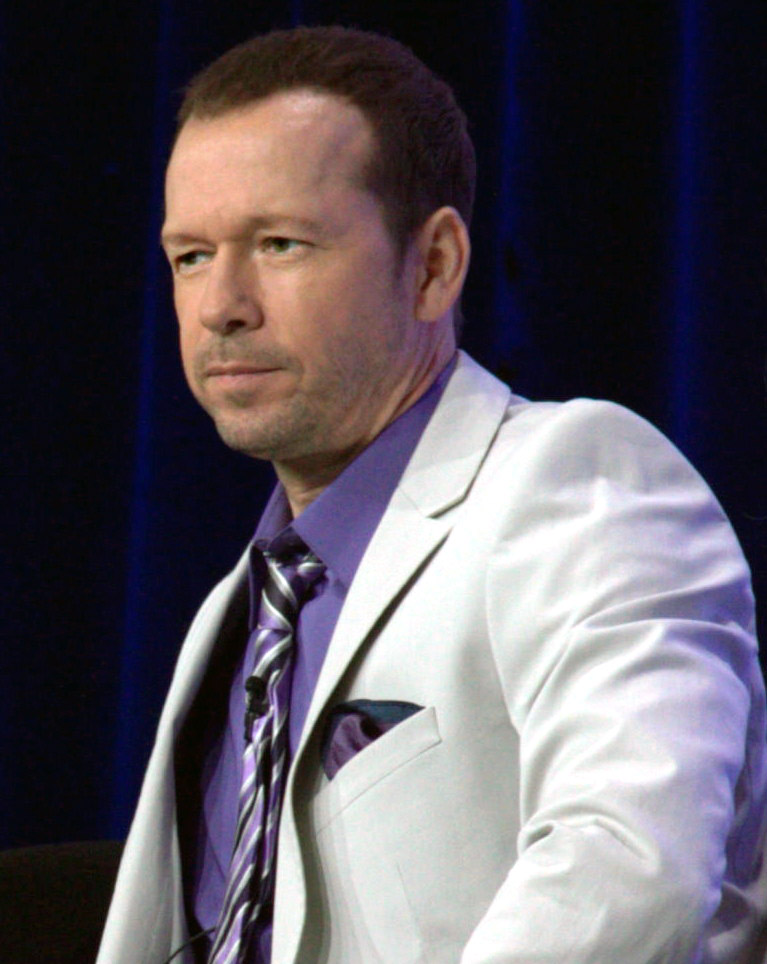
Ice Cube and Donnie Wahlberg

Celtics/Lakers: Best of Enemies is a 2017 documentary film about the history of the National Basketball Association (NBA) rivalry between the Boston Celtics and the Los Angeles Lakers. Directed by Jim Podhoretz and executive-produced by Jonathan Hock, the five-hour documentary is split into three parts: two hours, one hour, and two hours. It premiered on June 13, 2017, on ESPN as part of its 30 for 30 series.

The documentary opens by talking about the teams in the 1950s and 1960s, when the Lakers won five championships but lost all seven times they met the Celtics in the NBA Finals. Much of the documentary focuses on the teams' dominant performances during the 1980s, when the teams combined for eight titles and 13 NBA Finals appearances, including three head-to-head meetings in the NBA Finals (Lakers won in 1985 and 1987 and the Celtics in 1984).

The film is narrated by Donnie Wahlberg (born August 1969), who grew up a Celtics fan in the Dorchester section of Boston; and Ice Cube (born June 1969), who grew up a Lakers fan in South Central Los Angeles. Both were teenagers during their home teams' head-to-head meetups in the 1980s. Wahlberg narrates the parts about the Celtics; Ice Cube, the Lakers. Director Podhoretz said Hock proposed the idea of two narrators, each providing a clearly partisan perspective of the bi-coastal story.

Lakers players featured in the film include Magic Johnson, Kareem Abdul-Jabbar, Jamaal Wilkes, Byron Scott, James Worthy, Kurt Rambis, and Bob McAdoo, along with the team's longtime former general manager Jerry West and former coaches Paul Westhead and Pat Riley. Celtics include Bill Russell, Larry Bird, Kevin McHale, Danny Ainge, Cedric Maxwell, M. L. Carr, Quinn Buckner, and former coach K. C. Jones and others.

== See also ==
- Winning Time: The Rise of the Lakers Dynasty
- Magic & Bird: A Courtship of Rivals
- Magic/Bird
- Celtics–Lakers rivalry
- List of basketball films
