= Viera =

Viera may refer to:

== Places ==
- Viera, Florida, a community in the United States
- Viera, Piedmont, a subdivision in the municipality of Coggiola, province of Biella, Italy
- The Dolmen de Viera or Dolmen de los Hermanos Viera, a type of single-chamber megalithic tomb in Antequera, Spain
- Viera, a historical name of what now tends to be called Wyre, an island of the Orkney Islands, Scotland

== People ==
- Viera (given name)
- Anthony Viera, Trinidad and Tobago politician
- Barbara Viera (1941–2026), American volleyball coach
- Feliciano Viera (1872–1927), former president of Uruguay
- Gustavo Viera (Paraguayan footballer) (born 1995), Paraguayan football midfielder
- Gustavo Viera (Uruguayan footballer) (born 2000), Uruguayan football forward
- Helvecia Viera (1928–2009), Chilean actress and comedian
- Jonathan Viera (born 1989), Spanish footballer
- José de Viera y Clavijo (1731–1813), Spanish historian
- Luis Viera, American politician from Florida
- Meredith Vieira (1953), United States broadcast journalist
- Ricardo Viera (1945–2020), Cuban visual artist, curator, educator
- Santiago Viera (born 1998), Uruguayan footballer
- Sebastián Viera (born 1983), Uruguayan-born footballer
- Tabaré Viera (born 1955), Uruguayan politician

== Technology ==
- VIERA, line of Panasonic LCD and plasma television sets
- Ivanov ZJ-Viera, a Czech ultralight aircraft design
- Viera Cast, multimedia technology by Panasonic

== Other uses ==
- Viera, a leporine race in the Final Fantasy video games franchise, first appearing in games set in the Ivalice universe, and later being added to the playable races in Final Fantasy XIV.

== See also ==
- Vieira
- Vieri (surname)
