= Oliveri (surname) =

Oliveri is an Italian surname.

== Notable people ==
- Mario Oliveri (born 1944), an Italian Catholic bishop
- Nick Oliveri (born 1971), an American musician from Palm Desert, California
- Robert Oliveri (born 1978), a former American actor

== See also ==
- Olivieri
