= Vieyra =

Vieyra is a surname. Notable people with the surname include:

- Federico Matías Vieyra (born 1988), Argentine handball player
- Manuel Antonio Rojo del Río y Vieyra (1708–1764), Mexican friar
- Paulin Soumanou Vieyra (1925–1987), Beninese/Senegalese film director and historian

== See also ==
- Vieira
