= Oliver Township =

Oliver Township may refer to:

- Oliver Township, Scott County, Arkansas, in Scott County, Arkansas
- Oliver Township, Huron County, Michigan
- Oliver Township, Kalkaska County, Michigan
- Oliver Township, Taney County, Missouri
- Oliver Township, Williams County, North Dakota, in Williams County, North Dakota
- Oliver Township, Adams County, Ohio
- Oliver Township, Perry County, Pennsylvania
- Oliver Township, Mifflin County, Pennsylvania
- Oliver Township, Jefferson County, Pennsylvania
