= Olivieri =

Olivieri is a surname of Italian and Corsican origins. The name refers to:

- Aldo Olivieri (1910–2001), Italian football player
- Andrew Olivieri (born 1981), Canadian football player
- Annibale degli Abati Olivieri, Italian aristocrat, writer & amateur archeologist
- Chiara Olivieri (born 1979), Italian curler
- Dawn Olivieri (contemporary), actress and model
- Dennis Olivieri (1947–2006), American former actor and singer known professionally in his early years as Dennis Joel
- Federico Olivieri (born 2001), known as Olly, Italian singer-songwriter and rapper
- Emanuele Olivieri (born 2008), Italian racing driver
- Genaro Alberto Olivieri (born 1998), Argentinian tennis player
- Giorgio Olivieri (born 2000), Italian hammer thrower
- Harry Olivieri (1916–2006), Italian-American restaurateur; co-inventor of the Philly cheesesteak
- Isabelle Olivieri (1957–2016), French biologist, specialising in evolutionary sciences, genetics and population biology
- Nancy Olivieri (born 1953/54), Canadian haematologist and researcher
- Nikola Olivieri (born 1987), Italian football player
- Pat Olivieri (died 1974), Italian-American restaurateur; co-inventor of the Philly cheesesteak
- Renato Olivieri (1925–2013), Italian novelist

== See also ==
- Olivier (surname)
- Vieri (surname)
- Vieira
