= Celtics–Lakers rivalry =

NBA rivalry

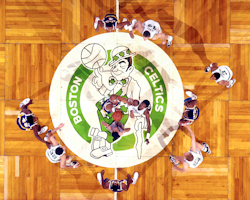
- Jump ball between the Boston Celtics and Los Angeles Lakers at the Boston Garden in 1988

- Boston Celtics Los Angeles Lakers
- First meeting: November 9, 1948; Celtics 77, Lakers 55
- Latest meeting: February 22, 2026; Celtics 111, Lakers 89
- Next meeting: January 7, 2027

Statistics
- Total meetings: 378
- All-time series: 212–166 (BOS)
- Regular season series: 169–135 (BOS)
- Postseason results: 43–31 (BOS)
- Longest win streak: BOS W18
- Current win streak: BOS W2

Postseason history
- 1959 NBA Finals: Celtics won, 4–0; 1962 NBA Finals: Celtics won, 4–3; 1963 NBA Finals: Celtics won, 4–2; 1965 NBA Finals: Celtics won, 4–1; 1966 NBA Finals: Celtics won, 4–3; 1968 NBA Finals: Celtics won, 4–2; 1969 NBA Finals: Celtics won, 4–3; 1984 NBA Finals: Celtics won, 4–3; 1985 NBA Finals: Lakers won, 4–2; 1987 NBA Finals: Lakers won, 4–2; 2008 NBA Finals: Celtics won, 4–2; 2010 NBA Finals: Lakers won, 4–3

Locations of the Boston Celtics and Los Angeles Lakers

The Celtics–Lakers rivalry is a National Basketball Association (NBA) rivalry between the Boston Celtics and the Los Angeles Lakers. The Celtics and the Lakers are the two most storied franchises in the NBA, and the rivalry has been called the greatest in the league. The teams have met a record 12 times in the NBA Finals, with their first such meeting being in 1959. They would both go on to dominate the league in the 1960s and 1980s, facing each other in the Finals six times in the 1960s (with the Celtics winning all six) , three times in the 1980s (with the Lakers winning two out of three), and, more recently, in 2008 (Celtics victory) and 2010 (Lakers victory). The teams also won 3 of the ten 10 titles of the 1970s, (the Lakers in 1972, the Celtics in 1974 and 1976), but they did not face each other in the NBA Finals during that decade.

The two teams have won the two highest numbers of championships in the NBA: the Celtics have won 18, and the Lakers have won 17 (12 in Los Angeles and 5 in Minneapolis). Together, they account for 35 of the 78 championships (or 45%) in NBA history, and were tied for the most titles with 17 apiece from 2020 until 2024. As of the 2023 offseason, the Celtics and Lakers have a .5918 and .5915 all-time winning records respectively. As of the end of the 2023–24 season, Boston is the only team with a winning overall record against the Lakers.

The rivalry became slightly less intense when Larry Bird and Magic Johnson both retired in the early 1990s. However, the intensity picked up again in 2008, when the two teams met in the NBA Finals for the first time since 1987, with the Celtics winning the series 4–2. They met again in the 2010 NBA Finals, which the Lakers won in 7 games. Although the rivalry is primarily known for the Finals meetings of the past, the two teams remain strong rivals to this day.

== History ==
=== 1950s: Boston Celtics and Minneapolis Lakers dynasty ===
During the first decade of the NBA in the 1950s, the Minneapolis Lakers had the first NBA dynasty. Minneapolis would win the first ever Championship Series of the newly formed NBA in 1950 (three BAA Finals were played between 1947–1949 and retroactively counted as NBA Championships, one of which was won by the Lakers in 1949). Under Hall of Fame head coach John Kundla, and with the NBA's first superstar in George Mikan, they would win three more titles in 1952, 1953, and 1954. The Celtics would emerge behind early NBA star Bob Cousy by winning the 1957 NBA Finals and losing in 1958.

The first NBA Finals match-up between the two teams was in 1959 when on April 9, the Boston Celtics swept the Minneapolis Lakers 4–0 for the first sweep in the history of the NBA Finals. This would mark the first Finals loss for the previously dominant Lakers, and the first of eight straight titles for Boston.

=== 1960s: Los Angeles Lakers and Boston Celtics dynasty ===
The Lakers relocated to Los Angeles in 1960. It was after this move, and during this decade, that the rivalry would truly escalate. The two teams emerged as the strongest in the NBA, featuring greats such as Bill Russell, Tom Heinsohn, John Havlicek, Sam Jones and head coach Red Auerbach for Boston and Elgin Baylor, Jerry West, Gail Goodrich, and coach/GM Fred Schaus for Los Angeles. However, it would ultimately prove to be the decade of the Celtics, who won the finals every year in the 1960s except for 1967. The Lakers would be the Celtics opponent in six of those series: 1962, 1963, 1965, 1966, 1968, and 1969. The Celtics won all of those match-ups. Three of those series (1962, 1966, and 1969) went seven games. The Celtics win over the Lakers in 1966 marked an unprecedented eight consecutive championships, the longest streak of any North American professional sports team.

The Lakers acquired Wilt Chamberlain in 1968, which brought the personal rivalry between him and Bill Russell, previously a feature of the 76ers–Celtics rivalry, to Celtics–Lakers. The Lakers posted the best record in the West during the 1968–1969 season. By contrast, the aging Celtics struggled to obtain the fourth seed, with Russell and Jones playing in their final seasons. Despite this, the Celtics upset the Philadelphia 76ers and the New York Knicks and made it to the Finals. The Lakers had home court advantage for the first time and won the first two games, but the Celtics rebounded to force and win a dramatic Game 7 at the Los Angeles Forum, defying Laker's owner Jack Kent Cooke's infamous prediction of a Lakers celebration. West was named Finals MVP despite being on the losing team, but it was small consolation in a decade where the Lakers went without a championship, every one of their Finals' losses in that decade coming at the hands of the Celtics.

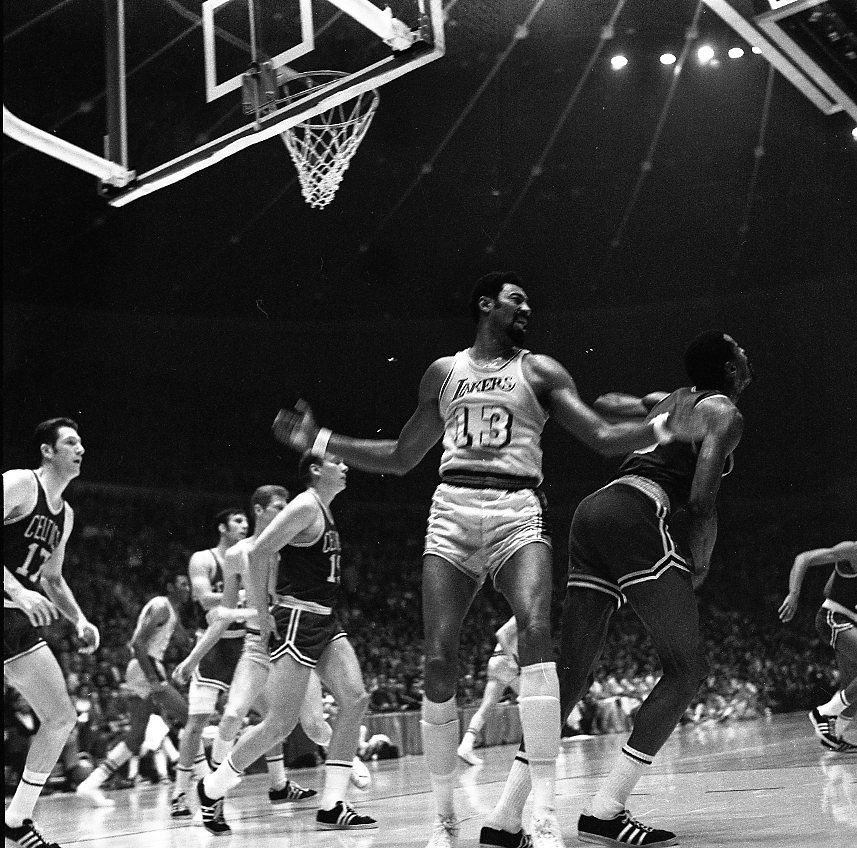
Wilt Chamberlain (#13) of the Los Angeles Lakers in the 1969 NBA Finals vs. the Boston Celtics

The 1969 Finals also caused a deterioration in the relationship between Russell and Chamberlain, who had previously been friends despite their rivalry, into one of intense loathing, when Chamberlain took himself out of the decisive Game 7 with six minutes left, and Russell thereafter accused Chamberlain of being a malingerer and of "copping out" of the game when it seemed that the Lakers would lose. Chamberlain (whose knee was so bad that he could not play the entire offseason and ruptured it in the next season) was livid at Russell and saw him as a backstabber. The two men did not talk to each other for over 20 years until Russell attempted to patch things up, although he never uttered a genuine apology. When Chamberlain died in 1999, Chamberlain's nephew stated that Russell was the second person he was ordered to break the news to.

=== 1970s: Championships but no rematch ===
The Celtics and Lakers both found success in the 1970s, but there would be no rematch between the two teams.

The start of the decade saw the Lakers' woes in the NBA Finals continue, with a loss to the New York Knicks in 1970. However, the Lakers rebounded two years later with a 33-game win streak in the regular season—a record which still stands. And to win the 1972 NBA Finals and their first championship in Los Angeles, also against the Knicks. This would also prove to be Laker great Jerry West's only NBA title. The following year, the Lakers again faced the Knicks in the 1973 NBA Finals and lost. They would not make it to the Finals again in this decade, but in 1975 they acquired Kareem Abdul-Jabbar.

The Celtics won the NBA Finals in 1974, and won again in 1976, under the leadership of coach Tom Heinsohn and players Dave Cowens, Paul Silas and Jo Jo White.

Neither team won another championship until the 1980s. However, the foundation for the renewed Celtics–Lakers rivalry of the 1980s was actually laid down in college basketball of the late 1970s. During the 1978–79 NCAA season, Michigan State was led by Magic Johnson to the championship game of the NCAA Tournament, where they faced Indiana State University, which was led by senior Larry Bird. In what was the most-watched college basketball game ever, Michigan State defeated Indiana State 75–64, and Johnson was voted Most Outstanding Player of the Final Four. Johnson would go on to be drafted by the Lakers, and Bird by the Celtics. The personal rivalry formed by these two basketball greats during college would transfer to their NBA careers, and reignite the rivalry between the two storied franchises that they came to represent.

=== 1980s: Showtime Lakers dynasty and Larry Bird ===
The Celtics–Lakers rivalry was renewed in the 1980s, in large part due to the personal rivalry between Bird and Johnson. Magic said of the games against the Celtics, "when the new schedule would come out each year, I'd grab it and circle the Boston games. To me, it was The Two and the other 80." Similarly, Bird said that, "the first thing I would do every morning was look at the box scores to see what Magic did. I didn't care about anything else."

The Showtime Lakers struck the first blow, winning the 1980 NBA Finals against the Philadelphia 76ers. The following year, behind the "Big Three" of future Hall of Famers Bird, Kevin McHale, and Robert Parish, the Celtics won the 1981 NBA Finals against the Houston Rockets.

The Celtics lost the 1982 Eastern Conference Finals to the 76ers, and along with it the possibility of a rematch with the Lakers. However, the final game of that series is memorable to the rivalry because Boston fans chanted for the 76ers, who were just about to eliminate their Celtics, to "Beat L.A.!" Despite the encouragement, the 76ers lost the 1982 NBA Finals to the Lakers, who were led by new head coach Pat Riley. However, the 76ers defeated the Lakers the following year in the 1983 NBA Finals. The 1982–1983 season would also be the rookie year of Laker James Worthy, another Hall of Famer in the storied rivalry.

The Celtics would get a new head coach in K.C. Jones, who was also a former Celtics player, and two teams finally had their long-awaited rematch in the 1984 NBA Finals, a seven-game series that had many moments, including a 137–104 blowout in Game 3 that led Bird to call his Celtic teammates "sissies", the Kevin McHale takedown of Laker forward Kurt Rambis which led to increased physical aggression by both teams, the heat of the infamously un-airconditioned Boston Garden in Game 5, and Cedric Maxwell's 24-point performance in Game 7. The Celtics went on to win in seven games, increasing their record of Finals' series victories against the Lakers to 8–0.

The following year, the Lakers finally had their revenge, winning the 1985 NBA Finals by taking Game 6 in Boston Garden, becoming the first visiting team to win an NBA championship in that arena before Golden State Warriors repeated it in 2022. They did this despite a game 1 34-point loss, dubbed the Memorial Day Massacre, in which Kareem Abdul-Jabbar apologized to Laker fans for their performance after the game. Nevertheless, they rebounded to win four of the next five games. Lakers owner Jerry Buss famously remarked that "this has removed the most odious sentence in the English language. It can never again be said that 'the Lakers have never beaten the Celtics'".

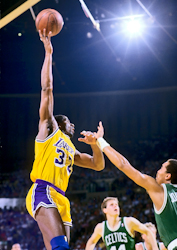
Magic Johnson against the Celtics in the 1987 NBA Finals

The Celtics rebounded the following year to win the 1986 NBA Finals against the Rockets. In the 1987 NBA Finals, the two teams met for a tie-breaker of their 1980s Finals matches, and the Lakers once again emerged victorious in six games, with the iconic image of Johnson's junior skyhook. This series marked the end of an era for the Celtics. They did not reach the Finals again until 2008. The Lakers, meanwhile, went on to win the 1988 NBA Finals against the Detroit Pistons, before losing to the Pistons the following year in 1989, and win titles again in 2000, 2001 and 2002, all while the Celtics wallowed in mediocrity.

Several journalists hypothesized that the Johnson–Bird rivalry was so appealing because it represented many other contrasts, such as the clash between the Lakers and Celtics, between Hollywood flashiness ("Lakers Showtime") and Boston blue collar grit ("Celtic Pride") and between black and white fans. Race was a determining factor for many fans in the 80's, with a surge of white fans cheering for the predominately white Celtics team and black fans appreciating the more athletic style of the Lakers. The city of Boston itself was split, as in an anecdote said by Magic Johnson, he mentioned a black fan that came up to him to tell him that the majority of Black Bostonians cheered for the Lakers whenever they played Celtics. Deemed the "Great White Hope" Larry Bird was seen by Boston as a means to represent their views, “to be their final stronghold to a game that in less than 20 years had turned almost completely black demographically”. But, Bird never bought into the narrative, rejecting the label and focusing purely on wanting to, as teammate Maxwell would say, “kick some ass and win”. Magic and Bird held the highest respect for each other, demonstrating on a national platform, “how people of different races and backgrounds can compete, be rivals even, and still coexist”. A 1984 Converse commercial for its "Weapon" line of basketball shoes (endorsed by both Bird and Johnson) reflected the perceived dichotomy between the two players. In the commercial, Bird is practicing alone on a rural basketball court when Johnson pulls up in a sleek limousine and challenges him to a one-on-one match. Despite their on the court rivalry, the two became friends after filming the commercial together.

Amidst a time when the NBA saw diminishing views, the Celtics–Lakers rivalry, led by Bird and Johnson, helped bring national attention to the NBA. In just their first Finals matchup, game 7 drew in a record breaking 40 million views on CBS. As a result, CBS started to shift their focus on the Celtics and the Lakers, showcasing a double header with both teams playing every weekend. With the two future Hall of Famers, the league won a whole generation of new fans. The rivalry between Bird, Johnson, and their teams contributed greatly to the success of the league during the decade; according to Bryant Gumbel, "Magic and Larry saved the NBA." Sports journalist Larry Schwartz of ESPN asserted that Johnson and Bird saved the NBA from bankruptcy. In every single NBA Finals series during the 1980s, either the Lakers or the Celtics were present.

Many basketball experts also mention how Bird and Magic changed the way the game was played. They gave people different perspectives on the game, like making that extra pass on the fast break or going up hard for a layup. They were basketball geniuses and played a game that required fundamentals and hard work; something that can be replicated by the fans watching their games. Jerry West, when talking about Bird and Magic, said that, “They definitely had a positive impact on the league”.

Playing off their rivalry in the NCAA and NBA, Johnson and Bird reunited to promote Game 5 of the 2018 World Series between the Los Angeles Dodgers (of which Johnson is a part-owner) and Boston Red Sox. In contrast to the frequent Lakers–Celtics championship match-ups, the Dodgers and Red Sox were meeting in the World Series for the first time (since the Dodgers franchise relocated to Los Angeles).

=== 1990s: Lull and rebuilding ===
During the 1990s, only the Lakers made an appearance in the NBA Finals, losing to Michael Jordan and the Chicago Bulls in 1991, the first championship in the Bulls' dynasty. This would prove to be a defining moment of the NBA, a changing of the old guard as the Lakers and Celtics fell into mediocrity, while the Bulls won six titles led by Jordan and coach Phil Jackson, who would cement their respective reputations as the greatest player and coach in NBA history. Both teams also faced setbacks in the form of personal misfortune. On November 7, 1991, Johnson announced he had tested positive for HIV and would retire immediately. Celtics star Reggie Lewis died of a heart attack in his prime in 1993, further marring the team in tragedy since second overall pick Len Bias died of a drug overdose two days after he was drafted in 1986. In 1994, neither the Lakers nor the Celtics made the playoffs, marking the first time in the history of the NBA that both teams missed the playoffs in the same season.

One of the more notable moments during this period came on January 20, 1995, when Lakers guard Nick Van Exel hit a game-winning three-point shot at the buzzer to defeat the Celtics 120–118 in the two teams' final meeting at the Boston Garden.

However, the Lakers began the rebuilding process in 1996 by trading for Kobe Bryant, who was drafted from high school that year by the Charlotte Hornets. That same year, the Lakers signed Shaquille O'Neal. En route to a franchise-worst 15–67 season, one of the Celtics' rare victories on the season came on November 27, 1996, when they defeated the Lakers 110–94 at the new FleetCenter. Bryant scored two points off the bench in his first visit to Boston.

In 1998, the Celtics drafted Paul Pierce, a native of Inglewood, California who had grown up as a Lakers fan. The following year, in 1999, Phil Jackson joined the Lakers as head coach.

=== 2000–2007: Lakers championships ===
The Lakers returned to prominence in the early 2000s. Under Jackson's guidance, and with O'Neal and Bryant leading the way, the Lakers won three straight championships in 2000, 2001, and 2002. The Lakers' title in 2000 came against the Indiana Pacers who were coached by Celtic legend Bird. Paul Pierce's nickname, "The Truth", was accorded to him by Shaquille O'Neal after a 112–107 Lakers' victory over the Celtics on March 13, 2001 in which Pierce scored 42 points on 13 of 19 shooting. O'Neal pulled a Boston reporter over and gestured toward his notepad. "Take this down", said O'Neal. "My name is Shaquille O'Neal and Paul Pierce is the [expletive] truth. Quote me on that and don't take nothing out. I knew he could play, but I didn't know he could play like this. Paul Pierce is the truth." In 2002, the Celtics, with Pierce and Antoine Walker, made an impressive run for the Finals and the two teams narrowly missed each other. However, the Celtics eventually fell in six games to the New Jersey Nets in that year's Eastern Conference Finals.

The Lakers returned to the Finals in 2004 but lost at the hands of the Detroit Pistons. Thereafter, O'Neal was traded to the Miami Heat. Without O'Neal, the Lakers missed the playoffs the following year and failed to advance to the Finals for the next three years.

The Celtics likewise made little playoff progress after their near Finals run in 2002. In 2004, they hired head coach Doc Rivers. In 2007, they made blockbuster trades for All-Stars Kevin Garnett and Ray Allen, who complemented career-long Celtics star Paul Pierce and emerging star Rajon Rondo.

=== 2008–2010: Rivalry renewed ===
With the addition of Allen and Garnett alongside Pierce to become the new "Big Three", along with the emergence of Rajon Rondo, the Celtics returned to the top of the NBA in the 2007–2008 season by posting the best record in the league and reaching the Finals. The Lakers also returned to the Finals with the help of the mid-season acquisition of Pau Gasol, and the two teams finally met again in the 2008 NBA Finals. The Celtics won in six games with an impressive come-from-behind victory in Game 4 and a blow-out of the Lakers in Game 6. The next season, the Lakers and Celtics played a regular season game on Christmas Day. The Lakers won that game, making Phil Jackson the fastest coach to win 1,000 games. They went on to win the 2009 NBA Finals that season, but the Celtics were eliminated by eventual Eastern Conference champions Orlando Magic. In 2009, the Lakers signed Ron Artest (now Metta World Peace).

The summer before the 2009–2010 season, Phil Jackson ran into Paul Pierce and told him, "Get it back, we want to meet you in the Finals." The Lakers ended the season with the West's best record, while the Celtics would enter the playoffs as the number four seed. Build up for a rematch began with the Lakers taking a 2–0 lead over the Phoenix Suns in the Western Conference Finals, with chants of "We Want Boston!" erupting in the Staples Center. Likewise, chants of "Beat L.A.!" erupted up in TD Garden as the Celtics took a commanding 3–0 lead over the Magic in the Eastern Conference Finals. Both teams fended off late series surges from their opponents, but won their respective series 4–2, setting up a rematch in the 2010 NBA Finals.

The 2010 series had memorable moments, including performances from Bryant who led in points for six of the seven games, Ray Allen's Finals' record eight 3-pointers in Game 2, Derek Fisher carrying his team to victory and then crying in Game 3, a hard-fought Game 4 where Glen Davis screamed so loud he drooled while Nate Robinson rode on his back, a dominant Lakers performance in Game 6, and a close Game 7 that became the highest rated NBA game since Michael Jordan's second retirement in Game 6 of the 1998 NBA Finals. The Lakers won Game 7 against the Celtics for their very first time, bringing their total number of NBA championships to sixteen (they have one NBL championship in 1948), just one fewer than the Celtics' seventeen.

The Celtics signed Shaquille O'Neal for the 2010–2011 season to replace the injured Kendrick Perkins, adding to the rivalry by bringing the Shaq–Kobe feud to the Celtics–Lakers. During a game against the Lakers on February 11, 2011, Ray Allen became the all-time NBA leader in total 3-point field goals made. However, both the Lakers and Celtics would be eliminated in the second round of the playoffs that year by the 2011 NBA Finals participants, the Dallas Mavericks and Miami Heat, respectively. The following year they would again both be eliminated by the eventual 2012 NBA Finals participants, the Oklahoma City Thunder and Miami Heat, respectively. With the disbanding of Boston's Big Three, and anticipated changes to the Lakers' roster, some believe that the 2011–12 NBA season was the last chapter of the current Celtics–Lakers rivalry.

On February 20, 2013, the Lakers played their first game since the death of long time owner Jerry Buss who had died two days earlier, paying tribute to him at the Staples Center before facing off against the Celtics. The Lakers won 113–99 in a game that saw Steve Nash pass former Lakers star Johnson for fourth on the all-time NBA assist list.

=== 2010s: Roles reversed ===
Both the Celtics and Lakers missed the playoffs in the 2013–14 season, marking only the second time it has happened in the rivalry's history. With the New York Knicks also failing to make the playoffs that season, it marked the first time in NBA history that neither the Celtics, Lakers nor the Knicks qualified for the playoffs in the same season.

But while the Celtics were able to return to the playoffs over the next three seasons and even made the Eastern Conference Finals in 2017 and 2018, the Lakers found themselves in a lengthy rebuilding process. Prior to 2014, the Lakers only missed the playoffs four times since moving to Los Angeles, and five times in franchise history. However, the Lakers proceeded to miss the playoffs a record six consecutive seasons, highlighted by four straight seasons with over 50 losses and a franchise-low 17–65 mark during the 2015–16 season.

On December 30, 2015, the Boston Celtics honored the Los Angeles Lakers' star Kobe Bryant in his final game in TD Garden. The Lakers would beat the Celtics 112–104.

Nevertheless, the rivalry between the Celtics and the Lakers remained fairly even during this recent period, with the two teams managing a split in the season series four of the last six times. However, battles between the Celtics and the Lakers took a back seat to the emerging rivalry between the Cleveland Cavaliers and the Golden State Warriors, who met in four consecutive NBA Finals between 2015 and 2018, where the Cavaliers were led by a big three of LeBron James, Kyrie Irving, and Kevin Love, while the Warriors were led by a big four of Stephen Curry, Kevin Durant, Klay Thompson, and Draymond Green.

Notwithstanding the Celtics' success and the Lakers' struggles during this period, both teams would make their presence felt in subsequent offseasons. The Lakers' run of futility rewarded them with several high first-round picks (D'Angelo Russell, Brandon Ingram and Lonzo Ball were selected second overall), while the Celtics benefited from the Brooklyn Nets' ill-fated 2013 trade for Paul Pierce and Kevin Garnett with their top-three selections of Jaylen Brown and Jayson Tatum. In addition, the Celtics went on to sign All-Star free agents Al Horford and Gordon Hayward in addition to acquiring Kyrie Irving from the Cavaliers. The Lakers would counter by signing LeBron James in the 2018 offseason. The two teams continued to retool in the 2019 offseason; the Lakers acquired Anthony Davis from the New Orleans Pelicans while the Celtics brought in Kemba Walker after Irving left to join the Nets.

=== 2020s: Celtics break championship record ===
In the 2020 playoffs, the Celtics reached the Eastern Conference Finals against the Miami Heat, losing in 6 games with Miami denying a Lakers–Celtics matchup, which would have been their first match since the 2010 NBA Finals, while the Lakers defeated the Heat in the 2020 NBA Finals to become NBA champions and tie the Celtics for most championships at 17 each. Rondo, who was a part of the 2020 Lakers championship team, became the second player in NBA history, after Clyde Lovellette, to win titles with the Celtics and Lakers.

Two seasons later, both teams have a combined 35 players on the NBA 75th Anniversary Team. However, the Lakers were eliminated from playoff contention for the seventh time in nine seasons, while the Celtics advanced to the NBA Finals for the first time in 12 years after defeating the Brooklyn Nets in the Conference First Round (a rematch from last year's), the defending champion Milwaukee Bucks in the Conference Semifinals (a rematch from 2019), and finally the Miami Heat in the Conference Finals (a rematch from 2020). Attempting to win their 18th title to break a tie with the Lakers for the most titles, the Celtics lost to the Golden State Warriors in six games. In the 2022–23 season, both teams reached the conference finals, but a potential finals matchup was again thwarted when the eventual NBA champion Denver Nuggets swept the Lakers and the Celtics fell to the Miami Heat in seven games. In the following year, the Celtics beat the Mavericks to win their 18th championship while also breaking the tie with the Lakers.

== Finals summaries ==
=== 1959 NBA Finals ===
This was the first NBA Finals series between the Lakers and the Celtics, and the only such meeting to occur while the Lakers were still in Minneapolis. Minneapolis hadn't made an appearance in the Finals since winning four of the first five NBA Championships between 1950 and 1954, while Boston was making its third straight Finals appearance after winning in 1957 and losing in 1958. Minneapolis, led by rookie sensation Elgin Baylor, made the Finals by defeating the defending World Champion St. Louis Hawks. Boston would face a tough seven-game series against the Syracuse Nationals but would eventually emerge victorious, leading Celtic star Bob Cousy to predict that Boston would sweep Minneapolis. Cousy would prove his prediction correct, leading his team with 51 total assists (still a record for a four-game NBA Finals series) to defeat the Minneapolis Lakers in the first 4–0 sweep ever in the NBA Finals. This marked the first of Boston's record eight straight titles.

=== 1962 NBA Finals ===
This was the first NBA Finals series between the Lakers and Celtics after the Lakers moved to Los Angeles.

Boston would win game one. However, the Lakers would edge out for close victories in Game 2 and Game 3. The Celtics would win Game 4 before the Lakers would come back and win another close victory in Game 5. In the Game 5 victory, Baylor grabbed 22 rebounds and set the still-standing NBA record for points in a finals game with 61, despite fouling out of the game. The Celtics won Game 6 to set up the first Game 7 between the two franchises.

In Game 7, Laker Frank Selvy, after making two jumpers in the final 40 seconds to tie the game, missed a potential title-winning 18 foot jump shot in regulation, a miss which he said in June 2010 still haunted him more than 40 years later. Instead, the game went into overtime and the Celtics won by three points.

=== 1963 NBA Finals ===
The Lakers and Celtics would meet the following year in 1963. The Celtics would again defeat the Lakers.

The Celtics took the first two games, but the Lakers would blow the Celtics out with a 20-point differential in Game 3. Although the Celtics would take Game 4, the Lakers would win Game 5 and fuel speculation that the young Lakers were about to surge past the older Celtics. A defiant Bill Russell denied that any such thing was going to happen. Sure enough, despite several close games, including the decisive game only having a three-point differential once again, the Celtics would only require six games to close out the Lakers this time.

This series would also be notable for its future implications in NBA telecasts. When angry crowds showed up in Los Angeles to buy playoff tickets that were not available, the Lakers quieted the crowd by offering closed circuit TV viewing for $2.50 a head. "We were aware we were testing the future of pay television", Lakers general manager Lou Mohs told reporters.

=== 1965 NBA Finals ===
The Celtics would make their ninth straight appearance in the NBA Finals and face the Lakers for the fourth time. Celtics founder Walter A. Brown died during the season, and Red Auerbach led the team back to the Finals with his first Coach of the Year award. The Celtics defeated the Philadelphia 76ers to enter the Finals, marked by Johnny Most's famous call of "Havlicek stole the ball!"

Unlike their previous two encounters, the Celtics dominated the Lakers, who were playing without an injured Elgin Baylor, and only Game 2 had a close score. The Celtics would win the series in Game 5 with a 129–96 victory over the Lakers. This was the largest margin of victory in a deciding Finals game, and would not be broken until 2008, when the Celtics defeated the Lakers once again by a score of 131–92.

=== 1966 NBA Finals ===
This was the Boston Celtics' eighth consecutive NBA Championship, a feat unrivaled in North American professional sports. Despite finishing second in the division standings for the first time in a decade, Boston would return to the Finals for a record tenth straight time .

After the Los Angeles Lakers' comeback overtime win in Game 1, Red Auerbach, who had challenged the entire league to topple the Celtics from their reign by announcing he would retire after 1965–1966 before the season had started (thus giving his detractors "one last shot" at him), announced Bill Russell as the Celtics coach for 1966–1967 and beyond, the first African-American coach in the NBA. Laker coach Fred Schaus privately fumed that Red's hiring had taken away all of the accolades his Lakers should have received following their tremendous Game 1 win.

The Celtics won the next three games and looked ready to close out L.A. in Game 5. However, behind the efforts of Elgin Baylor, Jerry West, and Gail Goodrich, the Lakers won the next two games, setting the stage for another classic Game 7 in the Boston Garden. The Celtics raced out to a huge lead, but down by 16 entering the fourth quarter, and 10 with a minute and a half to go, the Lakers mounted a furious rally in the closing moments which fell just short. The Celtics fended off the late Los Angeles rally to capture the NBA title and send Red Auerbach out a champion.

=== 1968 NBA Finals ===
After they both missed the NBA Finals in 1967, the Lakers and the Celtics would meet again in 1968. Boston's streak of 10 consecutive Finals appearances had been snapped in 1967 by the 76ers The 1968 Eastern Division Finals rematch between the Celtics and the 76ers, which started on April 21, was marred by the April 4 assassination of Martin Luther King Jr., but the decision was made not to delay the series.

The Lakers, led by new head coach Butch van Breda Kolff, would actually root for the Celtics to win the series, thinking that Bill Russell would be easier to defeat than 76er Wilt Chamberlain (Chamberlain would become a Laker the following season). The Lakers would get what they wished for and face the Celtics, but ultimately to the same result. The Celtics won Game 1, and the two teams would alternate victories through Game 5. Game 5 was notable for an impressive Lakers' comeback sending it into overtime, but the Celtics would ultimately win that game. In Game 6, the Celtics closed out the Lakers in convincing fashion with a 124–109 victory.

=== 1969 NBA Finals ===
With Bill Russell and Sam Jones in their final season, and plagued with injuries, the Celtics struggled to make the NBA playoffs as the fourth and final seed in the Eastern Conference. They upset the 76ers in the first round and postponed New York's finals appearance for another year. Awaiting the Celtics were the powerful Los Angeles Lakers who had a nucleus of Jerry West, Elgin Baylor and newly acquired Wilt Chamberlain.

After losing the first two games in the Forum in L.A., no one thought Boston would even pull out a victory. However, they won Game 3 and a buzzer-beater by Sam Jones tied the series up at two games apiece. The home team won Games 5 and 6 which set up a dramatic seventh game. Before the game started, Laker's owner Jack Kent Cooke placed flyers in every seat stating "When, not if, the Lakers win the title, balloons will be released from the raftors, the USC marching band will play "Happy Days Are Here Again" and broadcaster Chick Hearn will interview Elgin Baylor, Jerry West and Wilt Chamberlain in that order." Before the game, the Celtics circulated in their locker room a memo about the Lakers' celebration plans. Russell noted the giant net hanging from the ceiling during pregame warmups and said to West, "Those [expletive deleted] balloons are staying up there." West was furious at the balloons for providing the Celtics extra motivation.

Boston played tough through the first half and would keep the game close, with a score of 60–60. Remarkably, Boston would pull away and entered the fourth quarter up by 18. It seemed to be over when Lakers center Wilt Chamberlain was injured and replaced by reserve Mel Counts. The Celtics, however, would begin to show their age when they began missing shots and turning the ball over and Laker Jerry West pulled L.A. to within one. Despite having numerous opportunities, the Lakers couldn't get over the hump and Don Nelson would make an incredible foul-line jump-shot which bounced off the back iron and fell in. During this, another battle was heating up off the court between Jack Kent Cooke and Lakers coach Butch Van Breda Kolff. Chamberlain was pleading for Breda Kolff to put him back in, but he refused. Cooke then came down to personally order the defiant coach to insert Wilt, but to no avail. This would prove critical as the Celtics held on and triumphed 108–106.

The first ever Finals MVP award was given to Jerry West, despite being on the losing team (thus far the only time this has happened). Despite this, West was inconsolable. In a show of good sportsmanship, Bill Russell held West's hand and John Havlicek said: "I love you, Jerry!"

=== 1984 NBA Finals ===
By virtue of a 62–20 record, the Celtics had homecourt advantage over the Lakers who finished the regular season with a 54–28 mark. The Celtics defeated the Lakers four games to three.

The Lakers opened the series with a 115–109 victory at the Boston Garden. In Game 2, the Lakers led 113–111 with 18 seconds left when Gerald Henderson stole a James Worthy pass to score a game tying layup and the Celtics eventually prevailed in overtime 124–121. In Game 3, the Lakers raced to an easy 137–104 victory as Johnson dished out 21 assists. After the game, Bird said his team played like "sissies" in an attempt to light a fire under his teammates. In Game 4, the Lakers had a five-point game lead with less than a minute to play, but made several execution errors as the Celtics tied the game and then came away with a 129–125 victory in overtime. The game was also marked by Celtic forward Kevin McHale's takedown of Laker forward Kurt Rambis on a breakaway layup which triggered the physical aspect of the rivalry. Kareem Abdul-Jabbar would go after Bird later on in the third quarter, and 1981 Finals MVP Cedric Maxwell further antagonized the Lakers by following a missed James Worthy free throw by crossing the lane with his hands around his own neck, symbolizing that Worthy was "choking" under pressure. In Game 5, the Celtics took a 3–2 series lead as Bird scored 34 points. The game was known as the "Heat Game", as it was played under 97 °F-heat, and without any air conditioning at the infamous Boston Garden. In Game 6, the Lakers evened the series with a 119–108 victory. In the game, the Lakers answered the Celtics rough tactics when Worthy shoved Cedric Maxwell into a basket support. After the game, a Laker fan threw a beer at Celtics guard M.L. Carr as he left the floor, causing him to label the series "all-out-war." In Game 7, the Celtics were led by Cedric Maxwell, who had 24 points, eight rebounds, and eight assists as they came away with a 111–102 victory. In the game the Lakers rallied from a 14-point deficit to three points down with one minute remaining, when Maxwell knocked the ball away from Magic Johnson. Dennis Johnson responded by sinking two free throws to seal the Celtics' victory. Bird was named MVP of the series.

=== 1985 NBA Finals ===
The Celtics, looking to repeat as NBA Champions, had homecourt advantage for the second year in a row as they finished the regular season with a 63–19 record while the Lakers compiled a 62–20 record. For the first time, the Finals went to a 2–3–2 format with games one and two in Boston while the next three games were in Los Angeles.

The Los Angeles Lakers defeated the Celtics four games to two. Game 1 became known as the "Memorial Day Massacre" as the Celtics soundly beat the Lakers 148–114. Celtic reserve forward Scott Wedman made all 11 out of 11 field goal attempts. The Lakers responded in Game 2 with a 109–102 victory as Kareem Abdul-Jabbar had 30 points, 17 rebounds, eight assists, and three blocks. Michael Cooper had 22 points, making 8 out of 9 field goals attempted. In Game 3, the Celtics had a 48–38 lead in the second quarter before the Lakers, led by James Worthy, took a 65–59 lead at halftime and then pulled away in the second half to come away with a 136–111 victory. Worthy had 29 points while Kareem had 26 points and 14 rebounds. The Celtics tied the series in Game 4, 107–105 as Dennis Johnson hit a jumper at the buzzer. In Game 5, the Lakers raced out to a 64–51 lead and stretched it to 89–72 before the Celtics cut the deficit to 101–97 with six minutes remaining. However, Magic Johnson made three shots while Kareem added four more shots, and the Lakers came away with a 120–111 victory to take a 3–2 series lead. Kareem led the Lakers with 36 points. The series shifted to Boston with only one full day off for both teams. In Game 6, the Lakers were led by Kareem who scored 29 points as the Lakers defeated the Celtics 111–100. Magic had a triple-double with 15 points, 14 assists, and 10 rebounds; Worthy had 28 points on 11 for 15 shooting. It was the first time the road team clinched their NBA championship in Boston, the Golden State Warriors would later do this in 2022. Kareem Abdul-Jabbar was named MVP of the series, making him the oldest player (38 years, 1 month, 24 days) ever to win the MVP of an NBA Finals series.

=== 1987 NBA Finals ===
After being eliminated in the Western Conference Finals a year earlier, the Lakers returned to the NBA Finals and were awarded homecourt advantage as they accumulated a 65–17 record while the Celtics finished the season with a 59–23 record.

The Los Angeles Lakers once again defeated the Celtics four games to two. In Game 1, the Los Angeles Lakers came away with a 126–113 victory. Magic Johnson had 29 points, 13 assists, and 8 rebounds, while James Worthy had 33 points, 10 assists, and 9 rebounds. In Game 2, the Lakers took a 2–0 series lead with a 141–122 victory. Magic had 22 points and 20 assists, while Michael Cooper made six three-point shots, then a record for most three-pointers made in a single NBA Finals game. In Game 3, the Celtics posted a 109–103 win, led by Bird, who had 30 points and 12 rebounds. In Game 4, the Celtics had a 16-point lead in the third quarter before the Lakers stormed back into the game. Bird had hit a three-point bomb with 12 seconds remaining to give the Celtics the lead, however, with two seconds remaining, Magic Johnson sank a "junior sky hook" to give the Lakers a 107–106 lead, then Bird missed a 20-foot jumper as time expired, allowing Los Angeles to gain a three games to one lead. In Game 5, the Celtics prevented the Lakers from celebrating in the Boston Garden by coming away with a 123–108 win. Boston guard Danny Ainge made 5 out of 6 three-pointers attempted, including a 45-footer as the first half expired. In Game 6, the Lakers trailed the Celtics 56–51 at halftime, but thanks to an 18–2 run, they regained control of the game with a 30–12 third quarter to cruise to a 106–93 victory and their fourth championship in the decade. Magic Johnson was named unanimous MVP of the series, averaging 26.2 points, 13.0 assists, 8.0 rebounds, and 2.3 steals, leading the Lakers in all four categories.

=== 2008 NBA Finals ===
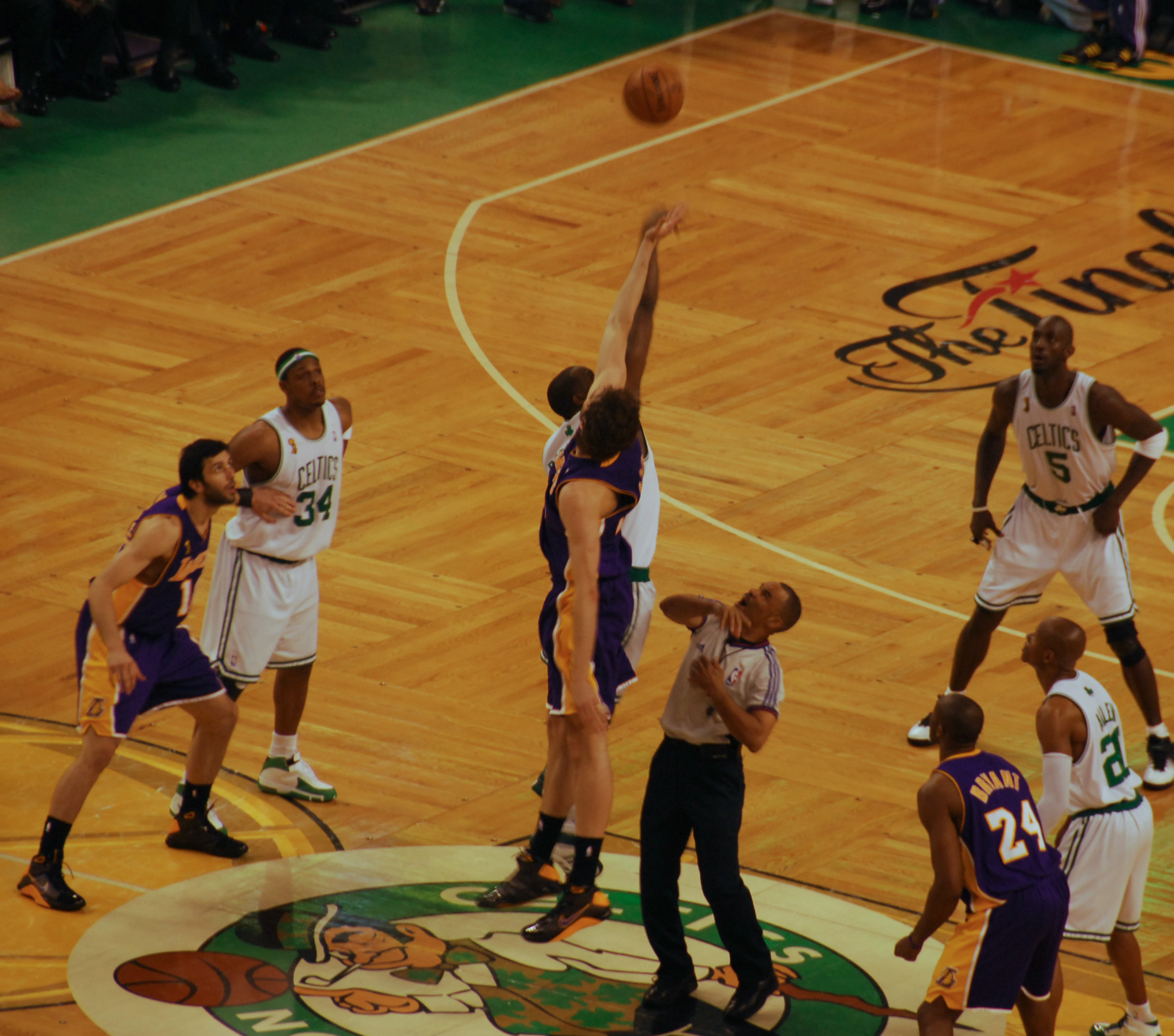
In 2008, the Lakers and the Celtics met in the NBA Finals for the first time in 21 years.

This was the first time the Celtics made the Finals since 1987, while the Lakers' last appearance had been in 2004. Boston was led by their 'Big Three' of Paul Pierce, Kevin Garnett, and Ray Allen. Los Angeles was led by MVP Kobe Bryant and All-Star Pau Gasol.

The Celtics' 66–16 record gave them home court advantage over Los Angeles (57–25). The Celtics won Game 1 98–88, highlighted by a dramatic comeback by Paul Pierce after a third quarter knee injury. In Game 2, the Celtics had a comfortable 24-point lead in the fourth quarter, before Kobe Bryant led a furious Lakers run that cut the lead to two. However the Celtics would hold on to win 108–102, taking the commanding 2–0 series lead.

As the series shifted to Los Angeles, the Lakers stifled Pierce and Garnett in Game 3, winning 87–81. They also looked to be in control of Game 4, holding their ground for most of the third quarter, leading by as many as 24 points. However, the Celtics went on a 21–3 run to end the third quarter, closing the deficit to only two points (73–71). With 4:07 remaining in the fourth quarter, the Celtics took their first lead in the game when Celtics' reserve Eddie House made an 18-foot (5.5 m) jumper. With House's shot, the Celtics were in the lead for good, winning 97–91. The Celtics' victory in Game 4 was the largest comeback in the NBA Finals until it was surpassed 18 years later by the New York Knicks in Game 4 of the 2026 Finals.

The Lakers would win Game 5 103–98, despite blowing another large lead, and the series shifted back to Boston. However, the Celtics would close out the series in Game 6 with a dominant 131–92 win. The 39-point margin of victory was the largest ever in an NBA championship-clinching game, breaking the old record of 33, also set by the Celtics over the Lakers in Game Five of the 1965 NBA Finals, 129–96. Paul Pierce was named Finals MVP.

This was the Celtics' 17th championship, their first one since 1986, extending their record for most NBA championships won by a single team. Their win in Game 6 was also a sense of relief. Entering the game, they set a record of most playoff games played in one season, with 26, breaking the previous record of 25 set by both the 1994 New York Knicks, whom Celtics Coach Doc Rivers played for, and the 2005 Detroit Pistons, both of whom lost in their respective finals in seven games (Knicks in 1994, Pistons in 2005). However, for the 1994 Knicks, the first round was a best-of-five. They also set an NBA record for most playoff games ever needed to win a championship, with 26, surpassing the previous record of 24 by the Lakers in 1988.

=== 2010 NBA Finals ===
This was the third straight year in which the Lakers advanced to the NBA Finals. Much of both rosters had been kept intact since the teams last meeting in 2008 and the Celtics' veterans Paul Pierce, Kevin Garnett, Ray Allen, and Rasheed Wallace looked to add to their championship résumés, while Kobe Bryant and the Lakers looked to even the score against the Celtics. The Lakers were the defending champions, having beaten the Orlando Magic 4–1 in the 2009 NBA Finals.

This was the first NBA Finals to go the full seven games since 2005, and only the fourth since the NBA switched the Finals to a 2–3–2 format in 1985. (Note: The 2013 NBA Finals were the last Finals to go the full seven game series while under the 2–3–2 format.)

The Lakers won Game 1 102–89, led by Kobe Bryant's 30-point performance. However, Ray Allen would respond in Game 2 by scoring 32-points and sinking a record eight 3-pointers, leading the Celtics to a 103–94 victory.

Game 3 returned to Boston, where the Lakers took a 2–1 series lead by winning 91–84, again led by Bryant but with strong support from Derek Fisher. Game 4 would prove to be a close and hard-fought game, with the Lakers up by two at the end of the third quarter. However, Boston's bench would prove to be the deciding factor, outscoring the Lakers 13–2 for nearly half the quarter, en route to a 96–89 victory. The Celtics won the game and evened the series.

Despite an impressive 38-point performance from Bryant in Game 5, the Celtics would win 92–86 led by Paul Pierce's 27 points, and would take a 3–2 lead heading back to L.A. However, the Lakers opened up a massive lead in Game 6, peaking at 27. The Lakers' bench had outscored Boston's bench 24–0 entering the fourth quarter. The Lakers would win the game 89–67 and set up an epic Game 7. Both Kendrick Perkins of Boston and Andrew Bynum of Los Angeles were injured in this game. However, while Perkins was ruled out because of his injury, Bynum was cleared to play in Game 7.

This was the fifth Game 7 between the Lakers and Celtics. Boston had won all previous Game 7 match-ups between the two teams. Bryant exhibited difficulties for much of the game, shooting only 6-for-24 from the field. However, he grabbed 15 rebounds and scored 10 of his game-high 23 points in the fourth quarter, including 8 out of 9 free throws. After the Celtics had built a 13-point lead late in the third quarter, the game was tied at 64 after a Fisher 3-pointer. Bryant hit two free throws and a jumper with 5:22 remaining to give the Lakers a lead they would never relinquish. Still nursing a 4-point lead with 1:46 remaining, Gasol blocked Pierce then converted a tough layup over three Celtics. After Wallace responded with a 3-pointer to make the score 76–73, Ron Artest sank a key 3-pointer for the Lakers to double the lead to 6 with 1:01 left. Artest's 20 points and all-around contributions led Phil Jackson to call him the MVP of Game 7. Ten seconds later, Allen hit another 3-pointer to cut the lead to 3. On the penultimate Lakers possession, Bryant missed, but Gasol snagged a crucial offensive rebound and found Bryant, who sank two more free throws. The Celtics would not give up, and Rondo grabbed his own offensive rebound and hit a 3-pointer to make the game 81–79. The Celtics were forced to foul Sasha Vujačić, he went to the line and made both free throws to give the Lakers a definitive 83–79 lead. Rondo would miss his final 3-pointer, Gasol grabbed his 18th rebound to go along with 19 points, and the Lakers won Game 7 against the Celtics for the first time in franchise history. They clinched their 16th NBA title, and repeated as NBA champions for the first time since their three-peat from 2000 to 2002 during the "Shaq and Kobe" era.

Game 7 was the third most-watched game in NBA history, with 28.2 million viewers (No. 1 being Game 7 of the 2016 NBA Finals, No. 2 being Game 6 of the 1998 NBA Finals). Game 7 was watched by an average audience of 1.1 million viewers on TSN, making it the largest Canadian audience ever recorded for an NBA game. This was also the first time since 2002 that a team has won back-to-back championships; that team was also the Lakers, led by Bryant and Shaquille O'Neal.

Kobe Bryant was named Finals MVP for the second straight year.

== "Beat L.A.!" ==
One of the lasting effects on the Lakers–Celtics rivalry was the usage of the famous "Beat L.A.!" chant, used by fans in opposing arenas whenever a Los Angeles–based team plays in their home venue. The chant originated during Game 7 of the 1982 Eastern Conference Championships at Boston Garden when the Boston fans urged the victorious Philadelphia 76ers to "Beat L.A.!"

In January 2011 before an upcoming Celtics–Lakers regular season matchup, Celtics forward Kevin Garnett with shoe company Anta released a "Beat L.A." green shoe which featured on the tongue the numbers "152–120", which was at the time the Celtics all-time record against the Lakers. The Celtics won the game, 109–96.

== Season-by-season results ==
Boston Celtics vs. Minneapolis Lakers/Los Angeles Lakers Season-by-Season Results
1940s (Lakers, 8–3)

Season	Season series		at Boston Celtics	at Minneapolis Lakers	at Neutral Site	Overall series	Notes
1948–49	Lakers	3–2	Tie, 1–1	Tie, 1–1	Lakers, 1–0	Lakers, 3–2	Neutral site game was played at Chicago Stadium, Chicago, Illinois. Lakers join the Basketball Association of America (BAA) from the National Basketball League (NBL) and are placed in the Western Division. Lakers win 1949 BAA Finals.
1949–50	Lakers	5–1	Lakers, 2–1	Lakers, 3–0		Lakers, 8–3	Basketball Association of America and National Basketball League merge to become the National Basketball Association (NBA). Lakers briefly join the Central Division. Lakers win 1950 NBA Finals.

1950s (Celtics, 55–29)

Season	Season series		at Boston Celtics	at Minneapolis Lakers	at Neutral Site	Overall series	Notes
1950–51	Tie	3–3	Celtics, 3–0	Lakers, 3–0		Lakers, 11–6	Lakers move back to the Western Division. Bob Cousy makes his debut for the Celtics. Lakers finish with the best record in the league (44–24).
1951–52	Tie	3–3	Celtics, 2–1	Lakers, 2–0	Celtics, 1–0	Lakers, 14–9	Neutral site Game was played at St. Paul Auditorium, St. Paul, Minnesota. Lakers win 1952 NBA Finals.
1952–53	Lakers	5–1	Lakers, 2–1	Lakers, 3–0		Lakers, 19–10	Lakers finish with the best record in the league (48–22). Lakers win 1953 NBA Finals.
1953–54	Lakers	5–3	Celtics, 2–1	Lakers, 3–1	Lakers, 1–0	Lakers, 24–13	Neutral site game was played at Madison Square Garden (III), New York City, New York. Lakers finish with the best record in the league (46–26). Lakers win 1954 NBA Finals.
1954–55	Lakers	6–3	Lakers, 2–1	Lakers, 3–0	Celtics, 2–1	Lakers, 30–16	Neutral site games were played at: Madison Square Garden (III); Hibbing Memorial Building, Hibbing, Minnesota; Concordia Fieldhouse, Moorhead, Minnesota.
1955–56	Celtics	7–2	Celtics, 3–0	Celtics, 2–1	Celtics, 2–1	Lakers, 32–23	Last season Celtics played at Boston Arena as secondary home arena. Neutral site games were played at: Madison Square Garden (III); St. Paul Auditorium; Kiel Auditorium, St. Louis, Missouri.; On November 11, 1955, Celtics beat the Lakers 119–75, their largest victory over the Lakers with a 44-point differential.
1956–57	Celtics	5–4	Celtics, 3–0	Lakers, 3–0	Celtics, 2–1	Lakers, 36–28	Neutral site games were played at: Rochester Community War Memorial, Rochester, New York; Kentucky State Fairgrounds, Louisville, Kentucky; Madison Square Garden (III).; Last time the Lakers held the lead in the overall series. Bill Russell makes his debut for the Celtics. Celtics finish with the best record in the league (44–28). Celtics win 1957 NBA Finals.
1957–58	Celtics	9–0	Celtics, 3–0	Celtics, 4–0	Celtics, 2–0	Celtics, 37–36	Neutral site games were played at: Detroit Olympia, Detroit, Michigan; Rhode Island Auditorium, Providence, Rhode Island.; Celtics sweep Lakers for the first time. Celtics finish with the best record in the league (49–23). Celtics lose 1958 NBA Finals.
1958–59	Celtics	9–0	Celtics, 3–0	Celtics, 1–0	Celtics, 5–0	Celtics, 46–36	Neutral site games were played at: Charlotte Coliseum, Charlotte, North Carolina; Detroit Olympia; Cow Palace, Daly City, California; Hec Edmundson Pavilion, Seattle, Washington; Rhode Island Auditorium; Elgin Baylor makes his debut for the Lakers. On February 27, 1959, Celtics beat the Lakers 173–139, repeating the record 44 point differential and setting a record for most points scored against the Lakers in a game and a franchise record for most points scored in a game. Celtics finish with the best record in the league (52–20).
1959 NBA Finals	Celtics	4–0	Celtics, 2–0	Celtics, 2–0		Celtics, 50–36	1st NBA Finals series. First sweep in NBA Finals history. Celtics win 22 games in a row against the Lakers.
1959–60	Celtics	8–1	Celtics, 3–0	Celtics, 2–1	Celtics, 3–0	Celtics, 58–37	Neutral site games were played at: Kiel Auditorium; Madison Square Garden (III); Cole Field House, College Park, Maryland; Last season Lakers played as a Minneapolis team. Celtics finish with the best record in the league (59–16). Celtics win 1960 NBA Finals.

1960s (Celtics, 75–48)

Season	Season series		at Boston Celtics	at Los Angeles Lakers	at Neutral site	Overall series	Notes
1960–61	Celtics	8–2	Tie, 1–1	Celtics, 3–1	Celtics, 4–0	Celtics, 66–39	Neutral site games were played at: Rhode Island Auditorium; Convention Hall, Philadelphia, Pennsylvania; Madison Square Garden (III); Kiel Auditorium; Lakers relocate to Los Angeles. Jerry West makes his debut for the Lakers. Celtics finish with the best record in the league (57–22). Celtics win 1961 NBA Finals.
1961–62	Celtics	6–3	Celtics, 2–1	Tie, 2–2	Celtics, 2–0	Celtics, 72–42	Neutral site games were played at: Madison Square Garden (III); Cole Field House; Celtics finish with the best record in the league (60–20).
1962 NBA Finals	Celtics	4–3	Tie, 2–2	Celtics, 2–1		Celtics, 76–45	2nd NBA Finals series. First NBA Finals in the rivalry to go to game seven. Most recent Finals in which the series was decided by overtime in Game seven.
1962–63	Lakers	5–4	Tie, 2–2	Lakers, 3–1	Celtics, 1–0	Celtics, 80–50	John Havlicek makes his debut for the Celtics. Neutral site game was played at Cobo Arena, Detroit, Michigan. Celtics finish with the best record in the league (58–22).
1963 NBA Finals	Celtics	4–2	Celtics, 2–1	Celtics, 2–1		Celtics, 84–52	3rd NBA Finals series. Bob Cousy plays his final game for the Celtics.
1963–64	Celtics	6–3	Celtics, 3–1	Tie, 2–2	Celtics, 1–0	Celtics, 90–55	Neutral game played at Madison Square Garden (III). Last season the rivalry is played at a neutral site. Celtics finish with the best record in the league (59–21). Celtics win 1964 NBA Finals.
1964–65	Celtics	7–3	Celtics, 3–2	Celtics, 4–1		Celtics, 97–58	Celtics finish with the best record in the league (62–18).
1965 NBA Finals	Celtics	4–1	Celtics, 3–0	Tie, 1–1		Celtics, 101–59	4th NBA Finals series. Celtics record their 100th win over the Lakers.
1965–66	Celtics	7–3	Celtics, 4–1	Celtics, 3–2		Celtics, 108–62	
1966 NBA Finals	Celtics	4–3	Tie, 2–2	Celtics, 2–1		Celtics, 112–65	5th NBA Finals series. Lakers force a game seven after trailing 3–1 in the series. Celtics appear in ten consecutive NBA Finals, an NBA record and tying a North American professional sports record with the NHL's Montreal Canadiens (1951–1960) and NFL's Cleveland Browns (1946–1955). Celtics win eight consecutive NBA Finals championships, a record in all North American professional sports.
1966–67	Celtics	5–4	Celtics, 4–0	Lakers, 4–1		Celtics, 117–69	Bill Russell becomes the player-coach for the Celtics.
1967–68	Celtics	4–3	Tie, 2–2	Celtics, 2–1		Celtics, 121–72	Last season Lakers played at Los Angeles Memorial Sports Arena. On December 31, 1967, Lakers open The Forum. On February 11, 1968, Lakers beat the Celtics 141–104, their largest victory over the Celtics with a 37-point differential and their most points scored in a game against the Celtics.
1968 NBA Finals	Celtics	4–2	Celtics, 2–1	Celtics, 2–1		Celtics, 125–74	6th NBA Finals series.
1968–69	Lakers	4–2	Lakers, 2–1	Lakers, 2–1		Celtics, 127–78	Final season for Bill Russell.
1969 NBA Finals	Celtics	4–3	Celtics, 3–0	Lakers, 3–1		Celtics, 131–81	7th NBA Finals series. Celtics and Lakers meet in seven NBA Finals in ten years. Celtics win eleven NBA Finals championships in thirteen years. Celtics become the first team in NBA Finals history to overcome a 2–0 series deficit and the first road team to win game 7. Jerry West wins the inaugural NBA Finals MVP despite being on the losing team, the first and only time this has happened. Last series for Bill Russell as he retires the next season.
1969–70	Lakers	4–2	Lakers, 2–1	Lakers, 2–1		Celtics, 133–85	Lakers lose 1970 NBA Finals. Elgin Baylor played his final game in this rivalry on March 3, 1970. He missed all ten meetings across the next two seasons before retiring.

1970s (Celtics, 22–16)

Season	Season series		at Boston Celtics	at Los Angeles Lakers	Overall series	Notes
1970–71	Celtics	3–2	Celtics, 3–0	Lakers, 2–0	Celtics, 136–87	Celtics are placed in the Eastern Conference and the Atlantic Division. Lakers are placed in the Western Conference and the Pacific Division.
1971–72	Lakers	4–1	Tie, 1–1	Lakers, 3–0	Celtics, 137–91	Lakers finish with the best record in the league (69–13). Lakers win 1972 NBA Finals.
1972–73	Celtics	4–0	Celtics, 2–0	Celtics, 2–0	Celtics, 141–91	Celtics finish with the best record in the league (68–14). Jerry West played his final game in this rivalry on March 9, 1973. He missed all four meetings the following season before retiring. Lakers lose 1973 NBA Finals.
1973–74	Tie	2–2	Tie, 1–1	Tie, 1–1	Celtics, 143–93	Celtics win 1974 NBA Finals.
1974–75	Celtics	4–0	Celtics, 2–0	Celtics, 2–0	Celtics, 147–93	Celtics finish with the best record in the league (60–22).
1975–76	Celtics	4–0	Celtics, 2–0	Celtics, 2–0	Celtics, 151–93	Celtics win 1976 NBA Finals. Kareem Abdul-Jabbar makes his debut for the Lakers.
1976–77	Celtics	2–1	Celtics, 2–0	Lakers, 1–0	Celtics, 153–94	Lakers finish with the best record in the league (53–29).
1977–78	Lakers	2–1	Celtics, 1–0	Lakers, 2–0	Celtics, 154–96	
1978–79	Lakers	3–1	Tie, 1–1	Lakers, 2–0	Celtics, 155–99	Last season where the Celtics and Lakers faced each other more than two games per season.
1979–80	Lakers	2–0	Lakers; 100–98	Lakers; 123–105	Celtics, 155–101	Larry Bird and Magic Johnson make their debut for the Celtics and Lakers respectively, beginning their rivalry. Lakers record their 100th win over the Celtics. Celtics finish with the best record in the league (61–21). Lakers win 1980 NBA Finals.

1980s (Lakers, 22–17)

Season	Season series		at Boston Celtics	at Los Angeles Lakers	Overall series	Notes
1980–81	Celtics	2–0	Celtics; 98–96	Celtics; 105–91	Celtics, 157–101	Celtics finish with the best record in the league (62–20). Celtics win 1981 NBA Finals.
1981–82	Tie	1–1	Lakers; 119–113	Celtics; 108–103	Celtics, 158–102	Celtics finish with the best record in the league (63–19). Lakers win 1982 NBA Finals.
1982–83	Celtics	2–0	Celtics; 110–95	Celtics; 113–104	Celtics, 160–102	Lakers lose 1983 NBA Finals.
1983–84	Lakers	2–0	Lakers; 111–109	Lakers; 116–108	Celtics, 160–104	Celtics finish with the best record in the league (62–20).
1984 NBA Finals	Celtics	4–3	Celtics, 3–1	Lakers, 2–1	Celtics, 164–107	8th NBA Finals series. First NBA Finals series between Larry Bird and Magic Johnson. Celtics beat the Lakers eight consecutive times in the NBA Finals.
1984–85	Tie	1–1	Celtics; 104–102	Lakers; 117–111	Celtics, 165–108	Celtics finish with the best record in the league (63–19).
1985 NBA Finals	Lakers	4–2	Lakers, 2–1	Lakers, 2–1	Celtics, 167–112	9th NBA Finals series. Lakers win their first NBA Finals matchup over the Celtics. Lakers become the first team to clinch the NBA Championship at Boston against the Celtics and the only time they've done so.
1985–86	Celtics	2–0	Celtics; 110–95	Celtics; 105–99	Celtics, 169–112	Celtics finish with the best record in the league (67–15). Celtics win 1986 NBA Finals.
1986–87	Lakers	2–0	Lakers; 117–110	Lakers; 106–103	Celtics, 169–114	Lakers finish with the best record in the league (65–17).
1987 NBA Finals	Lakers	4–2	Lakers, 2–1	Lakers, 2–1	Celtics, 171–118	10th NBA Finals series. First NBA Finals series to reach 10 occurrences.
1987–88	Lakers	2–0	Lakers; 115–114	Lakers; 115–106	Celtics, 171–120	Lakers finish with the best record in the league (62–20). Lakers win 1988 NBA Finals.
1988–89	Tie	1–1	Celtics; 110–96	Lakers; 119–110	Celtics, 172–121	Lakers lose 1989 NBA Finals. Final season for Kareem Abdul-Jabbar.
1989–90	Lakers	2–0	Lakers; 119–110	Lakers; 116–110	Celtics, 172–123	Lakers finish with the best record in the league (63–19).

1990s (Lakers, 10–8)

Season	Season series		at Boston Celtics	at Los Angeles Lakers	Overall series	Notes
1990–91	Tie	1–1	Lakers; 104–87	Celtics; 98–85	Celtics, 173–124	Lakers lose 1991 NBA Finals.
1991–92	Celtics	2–0	Celtics; 114–91	Celtics; 114–107	Celtics, 175–124	Final season for Larry Bird.
1992–93	Tie	1–1	Lakers; 96–87	Celtics; 129–119	Celtics, 176–125	
1993–94	Tie	1–1	Celtics; 109–99	Lakers; 100–97	Celtics, 177–126	Both the Celtics and Lakers miss the playoffs in the same season for the first time in NBA history.
1994–95	Tie	1–1	Lakers; 120–118	Celtics; 118–92	Celtics, 178–127	Final season Celtics played at Boston Garden.
1995–96	Lakers	2–0	Lakers; 124–107	Lakers; 102–91	Celtics, 178–129	Celtics open up Fleet Center (now known as TD Garden). Final season for Magic Johnson.
1996–97	Tie	1–1	Celtics; 110–94	Lakers; 109–102	Celtics, 179–130	Kobe Bryant makes his debut for the Lakers.
1997–98	Tie	1–1	Lakers; 118–103	Celtics; 108–102	Celtics, 180–131	
1999–2000	Lakers	2–0	Lakers; 99–90	Lakers; 109–96	Celtics, 180–133	Due to a delayed Collective Bargaining Agreement, Celtics and Lakers did not play in the 1998 NBA season; Paul Pierce debuted for the Celtics that season. Lakers open up Staples Center (now known as Crypto.com Arena). Lakers finish with the best record in the league (67–15). Lakers win 2000 NBA Finals.

2000s (Lakers, 14–12)

Season	Season series		at Boston Celtics	at Los Angeles Lakers	Overall series	Notes
2000–01	Lakers	2–0	Lakers; 100–96	Lakers; 112–107	Celtics, 180–135	Lakers win 2001 NBA Finals.
2001–02	Celtics	2–0	Celtics; 99–81	Celtics; 109–108	Celtics, 182–135	Lakers win 2002 NBA Finals.
2002–03	Tie	1–1	Celtics; 98–95(OT)	Lakers; 104–96	Celtics, 183–136	
2003–04	Lakers	2–0	Lakers; 117–109	Lakers; 105–82	Celtics, 183–138	Lakers lose 2004 NBA Finals.
2004–05	Tie	1–1	Celtics; 104–101	Lakers; 104–95	Celtics, 184–139	
2005–06	Tie	1–1	Lakers; 105–97	Celtics; 112–111	Celtics, 185–140	
2006–07	Lakers	2–0	Lakers; 111–98	Lakers; 122–96	Celtics, 185–142	
2007–08	Celtics	2–0	Celtics; 107–94	Celtics; 110–91	Celtics, 187–142	Celtics finish with the best record in the league (66–16).
2008 NBA Finals	Celtics	4–2	Celtics, 3–0	Lakers, 2–1	Celtics, 191–144	11th NBA Finals series. First NBA Finals series in the rivalry to take place in the 21st century. With their last NBA Finals series being in 1987, this remains the longest gap of the Celtics and Lakers not facing each other in the NBA finals at 21 years.
2008–09	Lakers	2–0	Lakers; 110–109(OT)	Lakers; 92–83	Celtics, 191–146	Lakers win 2009 NBA Finals.
2009–10	Tie	1–1	Lakers; 90–89	Celtics; 87–86	Celtics, 192–147	

2010s (Lakers, 15–12)

Season	Season series		at Boston Celtics	at Los Angeles Lakers	Overall series	Notes
2010 NBA Finals	Lakers	4–3	Celtics, 2–1	Lakers, 3–1	Celtics, 195–151	12th NBA Finals series. Latest NBA Finals matchup in the rivalry.
2010–11	Tie	1–1	Lakers; 92–86	Celtics; 109–96	Celtics, 196–152	
2011–12	Lakers	2–0	Lakers; 88–87(OT)	Lakers; 97–94	Celtics, 196–154	
2012–13	Tie	1–1	Celtics; 116–95	Lakers; 113–99	Celtics, 197–155	Paul Pierce traded to the Brooklyn Nets after the season.
2013–14	Lakers	2–0	Lakers; 107–104	Lakers; 101–92	Celtics, 197–157	Both the Celtics and Lakers miss the playoffs in the same season for the second time.
2014–15	Tie	1–1	Celtics; 113–96	Lakers; 118–111(OT)	Celtics, 198–158	
2015–16	Tie	1–1	Lakers; 112–104	Celtics; 107–100	Celtics, 199–159	Final season for Kobe Bryant.
2016–17	Celtics	2–0	Celtics; 113–107	Celtics; 115–95	Celtics, 201–159	Jaylen Brown makes his debut for the Celtics. Celtics record their 200th win over the Lakers.
2017–18	Tie	1–1	Celtics; 107–96	Lakers; 108–107	Celtics, 202–160	Jayson Tatum makes his debut for the Celtics.
2018–19	Tie	1–1	Lakers; 129–128	Celtics; 120–107	Celtics, 203–161	LeBron James signs with the Lakers.
2019–20	Tie	1–1	Celtics; 139–107	Lakers; 114–112	Celtics, 204–162	Game in Boston was played on Martin Luther King Jr. Day. Lakers win 2020 NBA Finals, tying the Celtics for most NBA Titles won.

2020s (Celtics, 8–4)

Season	Season series		at Boston Celtics	at Los Angeles Lakers	Overall series	Notes
2020–21	Tie	1–1	Lakers; 96–95	Celtics; 121–113	Celtics, 205–163	
2021–22	Tie	1–1	Celtics; 130–108	Lakers; 117–102	Celtics, 206–164	Celtics lose 2022 NBA Finals.
2022–23	Celtics	2–0	Celtics; 125–121(OT)	Celtics; 122–118(OT)	Celtics, 208–164	
2023–24	Tie	1–1	Lakers; 114–105	Celtics; 126–115	Celtics, 209–165	Game in Los Angeles was played on Christmas. Celtics win 2024 NBA Finals, once again holding the record for most NBA championships won with 18.
2024–25	Tie	1–1	Celtics; 111–101	Lakers; 117–96	Celtics, 210–166	First season with Luka Doncic as a Laker.
2025–26	Celtics	2–0	Celtics; 126–105	Celtics; 111–89	Celtics, 212–166	Final season for Jaylen Brown as a Celtic. Final season for LeBron James as a Laker.
2026–27	Tie	0-0	February 2nd, 2027	January 7th, 2027	Celtics, 212–166	

Summary of Results

Season	Season series		at Boston Celtics	at Minneapolis Lakers/Los Angeles Lakers	at Neutral Site	Notes
Regular season games	Celtics	169–135	Celtics, 85–51	Lakers, 79–59	Celtics, 25–5	
Postseason games	Celtics	43–31	Celtics, 27–11	Lakers, 20–16		
Postseason series	Celtics	9–3	Celtics, 5–1	Celtics, 4–2		NBA Finals: 1959, 1962, 1963, 1965, 1966, 1968, 1969, 1984, 1985, 1987, 2008, 2010
Regular and postseason	Celtics	212–166	Celtics, 113–62	Lakers, 99–75	Celtics, 25–5	There were 30 total Neutral site games played.: 8 games at Madison Square Garden (III).; 3 games at Kiel Auditorium and Rhode Island Auditorium; 2 games at St. Paul Auditorium, Detroit Olympia, and Cole Field House; 1 game at Chicago Stadium, Hibbing Memorial Building, Concordia Fieldhouse, Rochester Community War Memorial, Kentucky State Fairgrounds, Charlotte Coliseum, Cow Palace, Hec Edmundson Pavilion, Convention Hall and Cobo Arena.

== Individual records ==
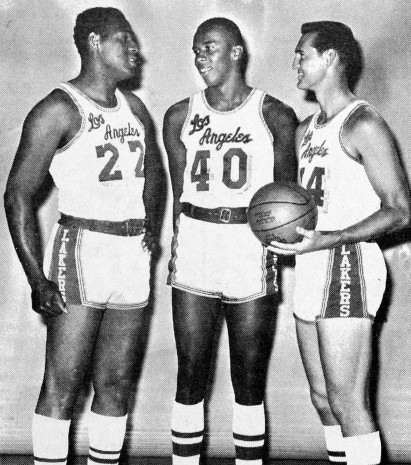
Elgin Baylor (left) and Jerry West (right) scored the most points in this rivalry. Baylor holds the regular season record, and West holds the postseason record in both total points and points per game.

=== Top scorers (regular season) ===
Rank	Player	Team	Points	GP	PPG
1	Elgin Baylor	Lakers	2,338	92	25.4
2	Jerry West	Lakers	2,171	85	25.5
3	John Havlicek	Celtics	1,954	96	20.4
4	Bob Cousy	Celtics	1,802	106	17.0
5	Bill Russell	Celtics	1,682	110	15.3
6	Sam Jones	Celtics	1,617	99	16.3
7	Tom Heinsohn	Celtics	1,487	80	18.6
8	Bill Sharman	Celtics	1,450	81	17.9
9	Vern Mikkelsen	Lakers	1,161	77	15.1
10	Frank Ramsey	Celtics	1,099	77	14.3

=== Per game (regular season, min. 10 GP and 24 PPG) ===
1. Shaquille O'Neal (LAL/BOS) – 27.2 (Note: Shaquille O'Neal scored 299 points in 10 games for the Lakers against the Celtics, and 0 points in 1 game for the Celtics against the Lakers.) (11 GP)
2. LeBron James (LAL) – 25.7 (12 GP)
3. Jerry West (LAL) – 25.5 (85 GP)
4. Elgin Baylor (LAL) – 25.4 (92 GP)
5. Kobe Bryant (LAL) – 25.1 (31 GP)
6. Jayson Tatum (BOS) – 24.9 (16 GP)
7. Paul Pierce (BOS) – 24.7 (26 GP)

=== Top scorers (NBA Finals) ===
Rank	Player	Team	Points	GP	PPG
1	Jerry West	Lakers	1,254	38	33.0
2	Elgin Baylor	Lakers	1,036	37	28.0
3	Sam Jones	Celtics	877	42	20.9
4	Bill Russell	Celtics	739	42	17.6
5	John Havlicek	Celtics	650	29	22.4
6	Larry Bird	Celtics	480	19	25.3
7	Kareem Abdul-Jabbar	Lakers	470	19	24.7
8	Tom Heinsohn	Celtics	429	22	19.5
9	James Worthy	Lakers	421	19	22.2
10	Magic Johnson	Lakers	393	19	20.7

=== Per game (Finals) ===
1. Jerry West (LAL) – 33.0 (38 GP)
2. Elgin Baylor (LAL) – 28.0 (37 GP)
3. Kobe Bryant (LAL) – 27.2 (13 GP)
4. Larry Bird (BOS) – 25.3 (19 GP)
5. Kareem Abdul-Jabbar (LAL) – 24.7 (19 GP)

== See also ==
- National Basketball Association rivalries
- History of the Boston Celtics
- History of the Los Angeles Lakers
- Lakers versus Celtics and the NBA Playoffs, a videogame inspired by the rivalry
- Celtics/Lakers: Best of Enemies, a 2017 documentary about the rivalry made by ESPN for its 30 for 30 series
- Cavaliers–Warriors rivalry, a rivalry between the Cleveland Cavaliers and Golden State Warriors spanning from 2015 to 2018, during which both teams were the only ones to reach the NBA Finals, the most consecutive times in any major North American sport.
