= Nikola Olivieri =

Italian footballer

Personal information
- Date of birth: 11 January 1987 (age 39)
- Place of birth: Martinsicuro, Italy
- Position: Attacking midfielder

Senior career*
Years	Team	Apps	(Gls)
2005–2006	Fermana	11	(0)
2006–2009	Sambenedettese	67	(5)
2008	→ Pescara (loan)	3	(0)
2009–2011	Cosenza	11	(0)
2011	Casale	10	(2)
2011–2012	Maceratese	4	(0)
2012	Vigevano	10	(7)
2012	Giulianova		
2012	Vigevano		
2013–2014	Montegiorgio Calcio	13	(5)
2014–2015	Sestri Levante	17	(0)
2015–2016	Grosseto	26	(3)
2016–2017	Imolese	24	(1)
2017	Sanremese	8	(0)
2017–2019	Recanatese	52	(2)
2019	Tuttocuoio	8	(2)
2020	Tolentino	7	(0)

International career
2006–2008	Italy U20 Serie C	4	(1)
- * Club domestic league appearances and goals as of 01:05, 3 March 2020 (UTC)

Nikola Olivieri (born 11 January 1987) is an Italian footballer.

== Biography ==
Olivieri spent his entire professional career in Italian Lega Pro. After the bankruptcy of Fermana, he left for Sambenedettese. In January 2008, Olivieri was swapped with Axel Vicentini. After the bankruptcy of Sambenedettese, Olivieri left for Cosenza. On 31 January 2011 his contract was terminated, and Olivieri left for Casale.

=== Amateur ===
In November 2011 Olivieri left for Maceratese of Eccellenza Marche.

=== International career ===
Olivieri was selected to 2006 Trofeo Dossena at the end of 2005–06 season for Italy U20 Serie C team. He scored a goal as a substitute against Hungary in 2006–07 Mirop Cup on 15 November 2006, a 1–1 draw. He also played against Belgium in November 2006. He was in the losing finalists in 2007 Serie C Quadrangular Tournament for U20 Serie C. Olivieri also played the match against Wales and England C in 2007–09 International Challenge Trophy. Olivieri was also selected for the 2008 Trofeo Dossena in June 2008. Olivieri represented Serie C1/B in the 2008 Serie C under-21 Tournament in January 2008. Olivieri also played the match 2–2 draw with Italy under-21 Serie B representative team.
