= Baron Olivier =

Baron Olivier may refer to:

- Sydney Olivier, 1st Baron Olivier (1859–1943), British Labour politician
- Laurence Olivier, Baron Olivier (1907–1989), British actor and director

== See also ==
- Peter Oliver, Baron Oliver of Aylmerton (1921–2007), British judge and barrister
- Baroness Olivier
- Olivier (disambiguation)
