= Claude-Marie-Louis-Emmanuel Carbon de Flins Des Oliviers =

French man of letters and playwright

Claude-Marie-Louis-Emmanuel Carbon de Flins Des Oliviers (1757, Reims – July 1806, Vervins) was an 18th-century French man of letters and playwright.

== Publications ==
Theatre

- 1790: Le Réveil d'Épiménide à Paris, one-act comedy in verse, Paris, Théâtre de la Nation, 1 January Text online
- 1791: Le Mari directeur, ou le Déménagement du couvent, one-act comedy, in free verse, Paris, Théâtre de la Nation, 25 February, Text online
- 1791: La Jeune hôtesse, three-act comedy in verse, imitated from Goldoni, Paris, Théâtre de la République, 24 December, Text online

Varia

- 1779: Voltaire, poem, Text online: 1st edition 2nd edition revue et corrigée
- 1789: Les Voyages de l'opinion dans les quatre parties du monde
- 179?: Dialogue entre l'auteur et un frondeur, sur les ennemis des lettres & les faiseurs de libelles anonymes, suivi d'un Préservatif, Text online
- 1810: Choix de poésies by Nicolas Thomas Barthe and Carbon de Flins

== Sources ==
- Pierre Larousse, Grand Dictionnaire universel du XIXe, vol. VIII, 1872, (p. 485).
