= Charles Olivier =

American writer, producer, journalist and editor

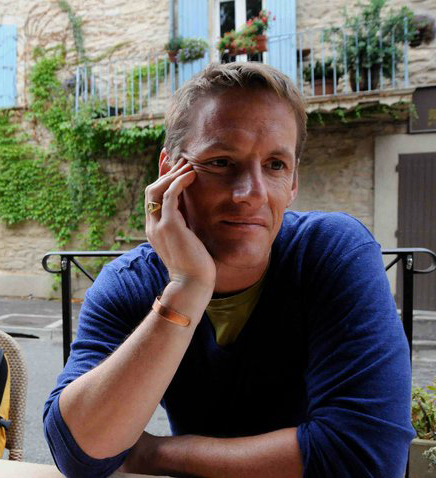
- Born: London, England, United Kingdom
- Occupations: Screenwriter, Playwright, Editor

Charles Olivier is an American film and television writer, producer, playwright, journalist and editor. His work has won several Emmys, a Peabody award, a Thurgood Marshall Humanitarian Award for Excellence in Journalism, as well as many other accolades. He and his films have taken top awards or been nominated at the Sundance Film Festival, the Berlin Film Festival, the Tribeca Film Festival, and many more.

== Early life and education ==
Olivier was born in London, England, growing up there as well as in Belgium, France and the United States. He attended the St. Mark's School of Texas in Dallas, Texas. In college, he was a Plan II honors student at the University of Texas at Austin, concentrating on languages and comparative politics. He later attended New York University's Tisch School of the Arts where he studied screenwriting and film production.

== Career ==
While at NYU, he co-founded the New York theatre company Argo with Circle in the Square actors, working as playwright and director.

Following NYU he moved to France to work as a print journalist for Agence France Presse working the West Africa and English desk while also developing teleplays for France's TF1. He was introduced to and began working alongside theatre director Robert Wilson in France, Germany and the UK, and developing works with Herbert Grönemeyer for the Berliner Ensemble theatre.

Returning to New York, he began writing and editing for videogame developer Rockstar Games while developing a stretch of documentary work sourced from stringer pieces he had done with Associated Press and Reuters. Two main documentaries, Deadline about controversial Illinois Governor George Ryan and The Nine Lives of Marion Barry came from this period. Deadline would go on to be nominated for a Grand Jury Award at Sundance where it was purchased by Dateline. The Nine Lives of Marion Barry was acquired and televised on HBO.

He wrote and produced for PBS's Frontline and Wide Angle as well as several civil rights documentaries, notably the Emmy Award-winning series 10 Days That Unexpectedly Changed America.

He has also worked with friend and collaborator Ezra Edelman on numerous sports-themed documentaries for HBO including the Ghosts of Flatbush (2008), about the Brooklyn Dodgers and New York in the 1950s which won an Emmy; Magic & Bird: a Courtship of Rivals (2009) about Magic Johnson and Larry Bird and race politics in the 1980s which was nominated for an Emmy and won a Peabody Award.

In 2014, Amazon.com produced and released his audio drama, Christmas Eve, 1914, to commemorate the centennial of the World War I Christmas Truce. The piece stars actors Damon Herriman, James Scott, Xander Berkeley, Lance Guest, Cameron Daddo and Nate Jones.

In 2023, he won an Emmy for the documentary The Redeem Team along with Jon Weinbach. The feature film centered around the 2008 American Men's Olympic basketball team which comprised LeBron James, Kobe Bryant and Dwyane Wade. It was produced by Netflix, James' production company, Springhill Company and Wade's 59th and Prairie.

In 2024, Olivier was nominated for an Emmy for the series, The Jinx, Season 2, along with Andrew Jarecki and Zac Stuart-Pontier.

In 2025, he wrote and edited Eva Orner's documentary Surviving Ohio State, with George Clooney and HBO producing, that premiered in June of that year at the Tribeca Film Festival. It was subsequently released on HBO.

He and actor Owen Wilson often collaborate with writing and producing, developing news-based stories for both television and film.

He currently divides his time between Los Angeles, New York and France with his wife and two sons.

== Awards ==
While in school at NYU, he won the Wasserman award for Best Screenwriting. He also won Arista's Clive Davis award for his film scores and music composition.

Nominated for Grand Jury Prize at the Sundance Film Festival in 2004 for documentary Deadline about Governor George Ryan. A long time Republican, Ryan broke with his party and helped to renew the national debate on capital punishment when, as governor, he declared a moratorium on his state's death penalty in 2000.

Won Emmy in 2006 for Nonfiction Programming for the television series the 10 Days that Unexpectedly Changed America. An investigation into Civil Rights workers James Chaney, Andrew Goodman, and Michael Schwerner who were murdered in Philadelphia, Mississippi during 1964's Freedom Summer.

Won Emmy again in 2008 for Nonfiction Programming for the film Brooklyn Dodgers: Ghosts of Flatbush. The story of the Brooklyn Dodgers, their fans and the turbulent race relations of the 1950s.

In 2011, he was nominated for an Emmy for Nonfiction Programming for the film Magic & Bird: A Courtship of Rivals as well as a nomination for the television series The Season. In 2011, he also won a George Foster Peabody award for Magic & Bird.

Won Emmy in 2023 for Best Long Form Documentary for the film The Redeem Team along with producers Jon Weinbach, Frank Marshall, Mike Tollin and Dwyane Wade.

Nominated for Emmy in 2024 for Outstanding Documentary Series as well as for Picture Editing for the series The Jinx along with director Andrew Jarecki and producer Zac Stuart-Pontier.

In 2025, Olivier was nominated by the American Cinema Editors society for their annual Eddie Award for best editor of a documentary series.

== See also ==
- Notable alumni of St. Mark's School of Texas
- University of Texas at Austin
