= Oliver School =

American school in Winchester, Kentucky (1892–1969)

- U.S. National Register of Historic Places
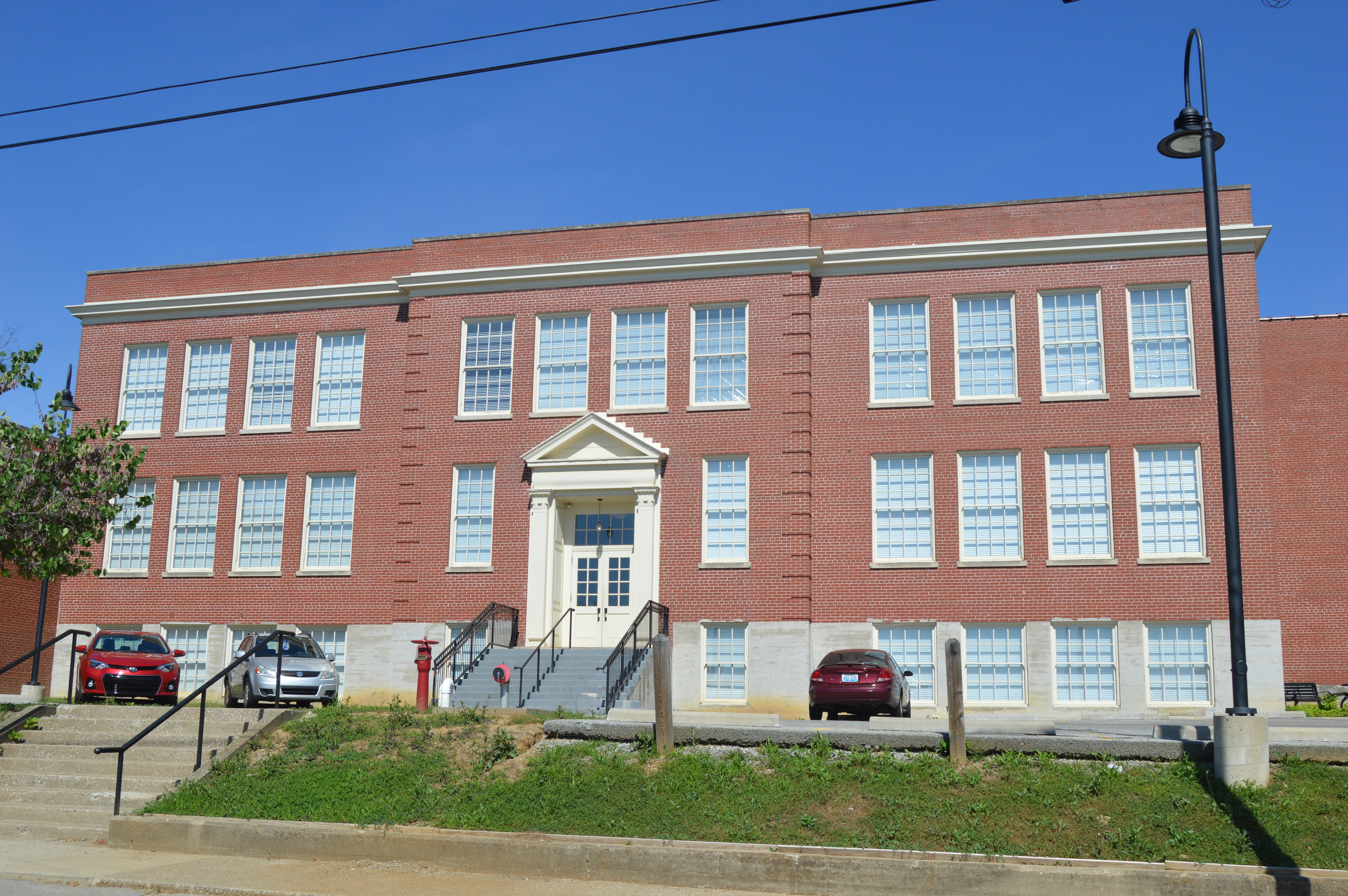

- Location within Kentucky
- Location: 30 Oliver Street, Winchester, Kentucky, U.S.
- Coordinates: 37°59′44″N 84°10′47″W
- Area: 0.7 acres (0.28 ha)
- Built: 1938
- Architect: M. Gibson Taylor (1956 expansion)
- Architectural style: Late 19th and Early 20th Century American Movements
- NRHP reference No.: 04000795
- Added to NRHP: August 4, 2004

The Oliver School (1892–1969), is a historic former elementary school and high school building that served African American students at 30 Oliver Street in Winchester, Kentucky, United States. The 1938 building was added to the National Register of Historic Places on August 4, 2004, for its contributions to Black and educational history. It has also been known as Oliver Street School, Oliver High School (from 1928 to 1954), and Oliver Elementary School (from 1956 to 1969).

== History ==
=== 19th century ===
The first Black schools in Clark County, Kentucky, opened in 1866, and 11 were active that year; with one of the earliest being the First Winchester School. Starting in the 1860s, G. S. Benton (also written as G. A. Benton), a graduate of Berea College, served as the first principal of the Black Clark County school system.

This Winchester, Kentucky, school site has a history of use beginning in 1892, as a 6-room unfinished school building for Black students. In 1897, the school held its first graduation, of a class of 11 students.

=== 20th century ===
In 1928, E. E. Reed became principal, and the Oliver School became a four year high school program. Reed expanded the campus by adding a gymnasium and a playground. Reed resigned in 1932, and was replaced by principal Scott V. Mitchell. In 1937, Mitchell was replaced by principal G. W. Adams.

The current three-story brick building was completed in 1938–1939 under principal G. W. Adams, and was expanded in 1956 with a multipurpose addition designed by M. Gibson Taylor Jr.

The Oliver School bobcats football team won a championship in 1954, with Joe Gilliam Sr. as coach.

In September 1956, the campus became the Oliver Elementary School for grades 1st–8th, and the high school students were bussed to Winchester High School (formerly an all-White high school) under the racial integration plan.

== Closure and legacy ==
The school closed in 1969. The Oliver Torch Foundation hosts alumni reunions.

== List of principals ==
- G. S. Benton, 1892
- J. H. Minge, 1893
- J. H. Garvin, 1894–1919
- E. S. Taylor, 1919–1927
- E. E. Reed, 1928–1932
- S. V. Mitchell, 1932–1937
- G. W. Adams, 1937–1956
- George A. Frazier, 1956–1969

== See also ==
- National Register of Historic Places listings in Clark County, Kentucky
