= Vieira =

- Pronunciation: [vj'ejra]

Origin
- Meaning: Scallop
- Region of origin: Galicia; Portugal

Other names
- Variant form: Vieyra

Vieira is a Portuguese and Galician term which in Portuguese and Galician stands for the Great Pilgrim Mussel from the scallop family (Pectinidae). The term leads to its use as a place and family name.

== History ==
The use of the term can be traced to the beginning of the 13th century in northwestern Portugal. The historical written form of the term Vieira was Vyeyra. It is assumed that the usage as a name originated independently in different places (e.g. Vieira do Minho and Vieira de Leiria). As a surname, the term is first found in northwestern Portugal in the province of Minho in the era of Kings D. Afonso II and D. Sancho II of Portugal around 1220 A.D.

The historically common spelling Vyeyra is found at least until the end of the Middle Ages in the mid-16th century. The modern Portuguese alphabet does not recognise the letter Y. At least until the end of the Middle Ages, the use of the letter Y was common in Portuguese written language, as illustrated, for example, by the following text from the 16th century:

... toda junta a quinze dyas de aguosto hou se o tempo que lhe pareçese bem he menos pryguo se espera se lhe fezese faroll da sua naao he pelo pomto do seu pyloto vyese demandar guoa he ele com hos guoleons que fiquavam hatravesase a jmdea pare-. ceu a todos bem he cheguado a naao do fejtor perto do gualeom do gouernador foy hele la em hũ esquyfe a quem deu ho Regymento da maneyra que comprya mais a servyço d ell rej noso senhor he alem deste mandado ha que as fustas provese dese fresquo ho mais que lhe fose necesaryo a quall despedyo de sy ho mesmo dya ja noyte he sy a nau de jorge vyeyra merquador em que levaram consyguo da jmdea quareguada de manty- mentos ha armada com lycença ha hurmuz he hũs na vollta da serra he outros na vollta do mar desapareçerom ...

Regarding the term Vieira, the writing with the letter I (i) instead of the Y (y) has become established. However, the term written as Vyeyra is still frequently found today using the letter Y (y), in names such as Vieyra, Vyeira and Vyeyra.

== Vieira as place name ==
The place name Vieira may refer to:

- Vieira do Minho
- Vieira de Leiria
- Praia da Vieira
- A Vieira, Galicia

== Vieira as surname ==
Notable people with the surname include:

- Adelino André Vieira de Freitas (Vieirinha, born 1986), Portuguese footballer
- Alessandro Rosa Vieira (Falcão, born 1977), Brazilian futsal player
- Alexandra Vieira (born 1966), Portuguese teacher and politician
- Alice Vieira (born 1943), Portuguese writer
- Álvaro Siza Vieira (born 1933), Portuguese architect
- Ângela Vieira (born 1952), Brazilian actress
- Anton de Vieira (1682?–1745), Russian administrator
- António Vieira (1608–1697), Portuguese diplomat
- Armando Mário O. Vieira, philatelist
- Asia Vieira (born 1982), Canadian actress
- Cláudia Vieira (born 1978), Portuguese actress
- Carlos Adriano de Souza Vieira (Adriano Gabiru, born 1977), Brazilian footballer
- Fábio Vieira (footballer, born 1991), Portuguese footballer
- Fábio Vieira (footballer, born 2000), Portuguese footballer
- Francisco de Matos Vieira (Vieira Lusitano, 1699–1783), Portuguese royal painter, illustrator and engraver
- Jelon Vieira, Brazilian choreographer
- João Bernardo Vieira (1939–2009), Guinea-Bissau politician
- Joey D. Vieira (1944–2025), American film and television actor
- Jorvan Vieira (born 1953), Brazilian-Portuguese football coach
- José Luandino Vieira (born 1935), Angolan writer
- Jussiê Ferreira Vieira (Jussiê, born 1983), Brazilian footballer
- Leonardo Vieira (born 1968), Brazilian actor
- Leonel Vieira (born 1969), Portuguese film director
- Leandro Ricardo Vieira (born 1979), Brazilian footballer
- Luís Filipe Vieira (born 1949), president of S.L. Benfica
- Marcelo Vieira da Silva Júnior (Marcelo, born 1988), Brazilian footballer
- Mauro Vieira (born 1951), Brazilian diplomat
- Meredith Vieira (born 1953), American journalist and TV host
- Milton Vieira (born 1978), Brazilian martial artist
- Patrick Vieira (born 1976), French footballer and coach
- Paulo Vieira (born 1992), Brazilian comedian, actor and TV presenter
- Paulo Afonso Evangelista Vieira (born 1958), Brazilian politician
- Ronaldo Vieira (footballer, born 1998), Bissau-Guinean footballer
- Ronaldo Vieira (footballer, born 1990), Brazilian footballer
- Rubens Vieira (born 1977), Brazilian politician
- Sérgio Vieira de Mello (1948–2003), Brazilian diplomat
- Susana Vieira (born 1942), Brazilian actress
- Thyago Vieira (born 1993), Brazilian professional baseball pitcher
- Valdeir Vieira (born 1944), Brazilian football manager
- Vasco Joaquim Rocha Vieira (1939–2025), last Portuguese Governor of Macau
- Waldo Vieira (1932–2015), Brazilian spiritual author, medium, physician and dentist

== See also ==
- Viera (disambiguation)
- Vieyra
- Vyeyra (pt)
