= Olivier (surname) =

The surname Olivier may refer to:

- The Olivier brothers René, Aimé, and Marius, French pioneering bicycle manufacturers
- Aída Olivier (1911–1998), Argentine dancer, vedette and actress
- Aimé Olivier de Sanderval (1840–1919), French explorer, entrepreneur and writer
- André Olivier (born 1989), South African middle-distance runner
- Art Olivier (born 1957), American politician
- Charles Olivier, American screenwriter
- Charles Pollard Olivier (1884–1975), American astronomer
- Chris Olivier (born 1984), American professional basketball player
- Christopher Olivier (born 2006), Austrian football player
- Claire Olivier (1892–1974), French actress
- David Olivier (born 1956), French and British philosopher and anti-speciesist activist
- Edith Olivier (1872–1948), English writer, mayor and hostess
- Eric Olivier (1888–1925), British South African cricketer and military pilot
- Ernest Olivier (1844–1914), French entomologist and botanist
- Fernande Olivier (1881–1966), French model
- George Olivier, count of Wallis (1671–1743), Austrian field marshal
- George Borg Olivier (1911–1980), Prime Minister of Malta from 1950 to 1955 and from 1962 to 1971
- Géraldine Olivier (born 1967), Swiss singer
- Gerhard Olivier (born 1993), South African rugby union player
- Guillaume-Antoine Olivier (1756–1814), French entomologist
- Herbert Arnould Olivier (1861–1952), English painter
- Jacques Olivier (born 1944), Canadian politician
- Jan Hendrik Olivier (1848–1930), Boer War general
- Jean-Baptiste Olivier (1765–1813), French general
- Juste Olivier (1807–1876), Swiss poet
- Laurence Olivier (1907–1989), English actor
- Louis Auguste Olivier (1816–1881), Canadian lawyer, judge and politician
- Louis-Éphrem Olivier (1848–1882), Canadian physician and politician
- Mathieu Olivier (born 1997), American ice hockey player
- Maud Olivier (born 1953), French politician
- Noël Olivier (1892–1969), daughter of Sydney Haldane Olivier, friend of Rupert Brooke
- Sidney Olivier (1870–1932), English cricketer
- Sydney Olivier, 1st Baron Olivier (1859–1943), British civil servant
- Théodore Olivier (1793–1853), French mathematician
- Veronica Olivier (born 1990), Italian actress
- Wynand Olivier (born 1983), South African rugby union player

== See also ==
- Olivieri
- Oliver (surname)
