= Oliviero (given name) =

- Pronunciation: Italian: [oliˈvjɛːro]
- Gender: Male
- Language: Italian

Origin
- Languages: Latin, Germanic
- Meaning: '"Elf army", "Olive tree"

Other names
- Variant forms: Olivero, Uliviero
- Nicknames: Oliverotto, Vieri,
- Anglicisation: Oliver
- Related names: Olivér, Olivier, Oliverio, Oliwer, Oliwier

Oliviero is an Italian masculine given name form of Oliver. Notable people with the name include:

- Oliviero Angeli (born 1973), Italian political scientist
- Oliviero Beha (1949–2017), Italian journalist, writer, essayist, TV and radio host
- Oliviero Belcastro (1928-1996), Italian footballer
- Oliviero Bergamini (born 1962), Italian journalist
- Oliviero Carafa (1430–1511), Italian cardinal and diplomat of the Renaissance
- Oliviero Cappellini (born 1983), Italian voice actor
- Oliviero Conti (1933-1973), Italian footballer
- Oliviero Corbetta (born 1952), Italian voice actor
- Oliviero Dalceri (born 1950), Italian rink hockey player
- Oliviero Diliberto (born 1956), Italian politician
- Oliviero Dinelli (born 1947), Italian actor
- Oliviero De Fabritiis (1902–1982), Italian conductor and composer
- Oliviero de Quintajé (1959-2007), Italian singer-songwriter and musician
- Oliviero Di Stefano (born 1964), Italian footballer
- Oliviero Edelli (1913 - death unknown), Italian footballer
- Oliviero Fabiani (born 1990), Italian rugby union player
- Oliviero Forzetta (1335-1373), Italian physician and notary
- Oliviero Garlini (1957-2025), Italian footballer
- Oliviero Gatti (1579-1648), Italian painter and engraver
- Francesco D'Macho (Oliviero Mori) (born 1979), Italian pornographic actor
- Oliviero Icardi (1912 - death unknown), Uruguayan footballer
- Oliviero Leonardi (1921-2019), Italian painter and sculptor
- Oliviero Lacagnina (born 1951), Italian composer
- Oliviero La Stella (born 1949), Italian journalist
- Oliviero Malaspina (1962-2025), Italian singer-songwriter, poet and writer
- Oliviero Mascheroni (1914-1987), Italian footballer
- Holly One (Oliviero Migliore) (1965-2006), Italian pornographic actor
- Oliviero Mario Olivo (1896-1981), Italian military personnel and physician
- Oliviero Pillon (born 1945), Italian politician
- Oliviero Pigini (1922-1967), Italian entrepreneur
- Oliviero Prunas (1940-2014), Italian actor
- Oliviero Riva (born 1974), Italian singer and record producer
- Oliviero Serdoz (1907-1978), Italian footballer
- Oliviero Toscani (1942–2025), Italian photographer, worked for Benetton from 1982 to 2000
- Oliviero Troia (born 1994), Italian cyclist
- Oliviero Visentin (1936-2020), Italian footballer
- Oliviero Vojak (1911-1932), Italian footballer
- Oliviero Zega (1924-2012), Italian footballer
- Oliviero Zuccarini (1883-1971), Italian politician

== Fictional characters ==
- Oliviero Pisani, character in Francesco Mastriani's 1852 novel The Blind Woman of Sorrento.
- Oliviero Rouvigny, character in the 1972 film Your Vice Is a Locked Room and Only I Have the Key.
- Oliviero Moroni, character in the 1972 film My Dear Killer.

== See also ==
- Oliver
