= Óliver =

Given name

- Pronunciation: Spanish: [/ˈo.li.βeɾ/]
- Gender: Male
- Language: Spanish, Icelandic

Origin
- Languages: Latin, Germanic
- Meaning: '"Elf army", "Olive tree"

Other names
- Variant forms: Olivér, Olivier, Oliwer, Oliwier, Olivério, Olivers, Oliva, Oilibhéar, Oilbhreis
- Anglicisation: Oliver
- Related names: Oliver

Óliver is an Icelandic and Spanish masculine given name form of Oliver. Notable people with the name include:

- Óliver Arteaga (born 1983), Spanish basketball player
- Óliver Bocos (born 1982), Spanish association football player
- Óliver Díaz (born 1972), Spanish conductor
- Óliver Escobar (born 1979), Spanish poet and political scientist
- Óliver Fula (born 1988), Colombian association football player
- Óliver Laxe (born 1982), Spanish film director, screenwriter and actor
- Óliver Morazán (born 1988), Honduran association football player
- Óliver Ortiz (born 1993), Mexican association football player
- Óliver Pérez (born 1981), Mexican former baseball player
- Óliver Rojas (born 2000), Chilean association football player
- Óliver Torres (born 1994), Spanish association football player

== See also ==
- Oliver (given name)
