= Coriolano =

Coriolano is both an Italian surname and a masculine Italian given name. Notable people with the name include:

- Bartolomeo Coriolano, Italian Baroque engraver
- Cristoforo Coriolano, German Renaissance engraver
- Giovanni Battista Coriolano (1590–1649), Italian Baroque engraver
- Theresa Maria Coriolano (1620–1671), Italian Baroque engraver
- Coriolano Cippico (1425–1493), Dalmatian nobleman
- Coriolano Garzadori (or Garzadoro), Roman Catholic prelate who served as Bishop of Ossero (1575–1614)
- Coriolano Ponza di San Martino (1842–1926), Italian general and politician
- Coriolano Vighi (1846–1905), Italian painter
