= Oliviero =

Oliviero is a given name and a surname. Notable people with the name include:

== Persons with the given name ==
Oliviero
- Pronunciation: Italian: [/o.li.ˈvjɛː.ro/]
- Gender: Male
- Language: Italian

Origin
- Languages: Latin, Germanic
- Meaning: '"Elf army", "Olive tree"

Other names
- Variant form: Olivero
- Nicknames: Oliverotto, Vieri,
- Anglicisation: Oliver
- Related names: Olivér, Olivier, Oliverio,

- Oliviero Beha (1949–2017), Italian journalist, writer, essayist, TV and radio host
- Oliviero Carafa (1430–1511), Italian cardinal and diplomat of the Renaissance
- Oliviero Diliberto (born 1956), Italian politician
- Oliviero De Fabritiis (1902–1982), Italian conductor and composer
- Oliviero Forzetta (1335–1373), notary and physician of Treviso from a family of self-confessed usurers
- Oliviero Garlini (1957–2025), Italian football player
- Oliviero Gatti (1579–1648), an Italian painter and engraver, native of Parma
- Oliviero Mascheroni (1914–1987), Italian professional football player
- Angelo Oliviero Olivetti (1874–1931), Italian lawyer, journalist, and political activist
- Oliviero Toscani (1942–2025), Italian photographer, worked for Benetton from 1982 to 2000
- Oliviero Troia (born 1994), Italian cyclist
- Oliviero Vojak (1911–1932), professional football player in Italy
- Oliviero Zega (1924–2012), retired Italian professional football player

== Persons with the surname ==
- Antonio Oliviero (born 1943), sailor from Italy
- Giuliano Oliviero (born 1974), former Canadian soccer midfielder, head coach of the Milwaukee Wave
- Leonardo Oliviero (1689–1752), Italian painter of the late-Baroque
- Nino Oliviero (1918–1980), Italian composer

== See also ==
- Oliver (disambiguation)
- Olivier (disambiguation)
- Olivio (disambiguation)
