= Olivier (given name) =

- Pronunciation: French: [/ɔ.li.vje/], Dutch pronunciation: [/ˈoː.li.viːr/]
- Gender: Male
- Language: French, Dutch
- Name day: July 12

Origin
- Languages: Latin and Germanic
- Meaning: "Olive tree" and "Elf army"

Other names
- Variant forms: Livî (Walloon), Oliuier (Medieval Dutch), Olivyi (Jèrriais), Ollivier (European French, Belgian French, Flemish), Olyuier (Medieval Dutch), Oulivié (Provençal)
- Cognate: Olivey (Gascon)
- Anglicisation: Oliver
- Related names: Olivér, Oliverio, Oliviero

Olivier
- Pronunciation: French: [/ɔ.li.vje/], Dutch: [/ˈoː.li.viːr/]
- Gender: Male
- Language: French, Dutch

Origin
- Meaning: "Olive tree" and "Elf army"

Other names
- See also: Oliver, Olivér, Oliviero, Oliverio

Olivier is a French and Dutch masculine given name form of Oliver which may refer to:

== Variants ==
- Flemish: Ollivier
- French: Ollivier
- Walloon: Livî
- Middle Dutch: Oliuer, Olyuier
- Jèrriais: Olivyi
- Provençal: Oulivié

== People ==
- Olivier, Baron de Brandois (1870–1916), French Olympic sailor
- Olivier, Count of Penthièvre (died 1433), French noble
- Olivier Amrane (born 1978), French politician
- Olivier Adam (born 1974), French author and screenwriter
- Olivier Aertssen (born 2004), Dutch footballer
- Olivier Alain (1918–1994), French organist, pianist, musicologist and composer
- Olivier Alary (born 1975), French-Canadian musician
- Olivier Allamand (born 1969), French freestyle skier
- Olivier Ameisen (1953–2013), French-American cardiologist
- Olivier Amrane (born 1978), French politician
- Olivier Anken (born 1957), Swiss ice hockey player
- Olivier Donat Andriamahefaparany, Malagasy politician
- Olivier Anquier (born 1959), French-Brazilian chef
- Olivier Antonny José Randrianantenaina, Malagasy politician
- Olivier Arnaud (born 1987), French rugby union player
- Olivier Asselin, Canadian film director and screenwriter
- Olivier Asmaker (born 1973), French cyclist
- Olivier Assayas (born 1955), French film director, screenwriter and film critic
- Olivier Auber (born 1960), French independent artist
- Olivier Aubin-Mercier (born 1989), Canadian retired mixed martial artist
- Olivier Auroy (born 1969), French writer and entrepreneur
- Olivier Aurenche, French archaeologist
- Olivier Auriac (born 1983), French footballer
- Olivier Ayache-Vidal (born 1969), French film director and screenwriter
- Olivier Azam (born 1974), French rugby union footballer
- Olivier Backes (born 1973), French sailor
- Olivier Bahati (born 1985), Burundian footballer
- Olivier Barbarant (born 1966), French poet
- Olivier Baroux (born 1964), French actor and comedian
- Olivier Barthélémy (born 1979), French actor
- Olivier Barlet (born 1952), French journalist
- Olivier Bardoux, French spearfisher
- Olivier Beauchet, Canadian neurologist
- Olivier Becht (born 1976), French politician
- Olivier Berggruen (born 1963), German-American art historian
- Olivier Bériot, French costume designer
- Olivier Besancenot (born 1974), French politician and trade unionist
- Olivier Beaudoin (born 1984), Canadian drummer
- Olivier Bianchi (born 1970), French politician
- Olivier Biaggi (born 1971), Swiss footballer
- Olivier Bilé (born 1967), Cameroonian politician
- Olivier Bitz (born 1975), French politician
- Olivier Blanchard (born 1948), chief economist at the International Monetary Fund
- Olivier Blondel (born 1979), French footballer
- Olivier Bobineau (born 1972), French sociologist
- Olivier Bochu (born 1971), French footballer
- Olivier Bohuon (born 1959), French businessperson
- Olivier Boissy (born 1999), Senegalese footballer
- Olivier Boivin (born 1965), French canoeist
- Olivier Boissiere (1939 - death unknown), French writer and commentator
- Olivier Bonnaire (born 1983), French cyclist
- Olivier Bonnes (born 1990), Nigerien footballer
- Olivier Borios (born 1959), French swimmer
- Olivier Boscagli (born 1997), French footballer
- Olivier Boulay (born 1957), French automobile engineer
- Olivier Bouygues (born 1950), French businessperson
- Olivier Bourdeaut (born 1980), French novelist
- Olivier Boumal (born 1989), Cameroonian footballer
- Olivier Boumelaha (born 1981), French footballer
- Olivier Bouillère (born 1970), French novelist
- Olivier Busquet (born 1981), American poker player
- Olivier Brandicourt (born 1956), French businessperson
- Olivier Brunel (c. 1552–1585), Dutch explorer
- Olivier Cadic (born 1962), French politician
- Olivier Carré (born 1961), French politician
- Olivier Charbonneau (1613-1687), Canadian frontiersman
- Olivier Chastel (born 1964), Belgian government minister
- Olivier Choinière (born 1973), Canadian playwright
- Olivier IV de Clisson (c. 1300–1343), Breton lord, father of Olivier V
- Olivier V de Clisson (1336–1407), Breton soldier and Constable of France
- Olivier Coipel, French comic book artist
- Olivier Cresp (born 1955), French perfumer
- Olivier Dacourt (born 1974), French former footballer
- Olivier Dahan (born 1967), French director and screenwriter
- Olivier le Daim (c. 1428–1484), born Olivier de Neckere, Flemish valet to King Louis XI of France
- Olivier Damaisin (born 1966), French politician
- Olivier Dame-Malka (born 1990), Canadian-French ice hockey player
- Olivier Dassault (1951–2021), French politician
- Olivier De Schutter (born 1968), Belgian legal scholar
- Olivier Debarre (born 1959), French mathematician
- Olivier Delaître (born 1967), French tennis player
- Olivier Deschacht (born 1981), Belgian footballer
- Olivier Desmarais, Canadian businessperson
- Olivier van Deuren (1666–1714), Dutch painter
- Olivier Dion (born 1991), Canadian singer
- Olivier Doleuze (born 1972), French jockey
- Olivier Dubois (born 1972), French choreographer
- Olivier Ducastel (born 1962), French film director
- Olivier Durocher (1844-1931), Canadian politician
- Olivier Elzer (born 1979), French chef
- Olivier Falorni (born 1972), French politician
- Olivier Faure (born 1968), French politician
- Olivier Ferrand (1969-2012), French politician
- Olivier Gaillard (born 1967), French politician
- Olivier Ganthier (born 1992), Haitian artist
- Olivier Gendebien (1924–1998), Belgian racing driver
- Olivier Giroud (born 1986), French footballer
- Olivier Giscard d'Estaing (1927-2021), French politician
- Olivier Goulet-Veilleux (born 1990), Canadian football player
- Olivier Gourmet (born 1963), Belgian actor
- Olivier Grouillard (born 1958), French racing driver
- Olivier Guichard (1920-2004), French politician
- Olivier Guimond (1914-1971), Canadian actor
- Olivier Guimond (1893-1954), Canadian comedian
- Olivier Guyon (born 1975), French-American astronomer
- Olivier Hanlan (born 1993), Canadian basketball player
- Olivier Henno (born 1962), French politician
- Olivier Higgins (born 1979), Canadian filmmaker
- Olivier Hoarau (born 1975), French politician
- Olivier Jacque (born 1973), French motorcycle racer
- Olivier Jardé (born 1953), French politician
- Olivier Jean (born 1984), Canadian speed skater
- Olivier Kamanda, American journalist
- Olivier Kamitatu Etsu (born 1964), Congolese politician
- Olivier Kapo (born 1980), Côte d'Ivoire-born French footballer
- Olivier Knox, American journalist
- Olivier Labelle (born 1985), Canadian ice hockey player
- Olivier Lacoste-Lebuis (born 1990), Canadian soccer player
- Olivier Latry (born 1962), French organist and improviser
- Olivier J. Leblanc (1830-1919), Canadian politician
- Olivier Le Jeune (died 1654), first recorded slave purchased in New France
- Olivier Le Peuch (born 1963/1964), French businessman, CEO of Schlumberger
- Olivier de la Marche (1425–1502), Burgundian courtier, soldier, chronicler and poet
- Olivier Levasseur (c. 1680–1730), French pirate
- Olivier Léveillé (born 2001), Canadian cross-country skier
- Olivier Lontchi (born 1983), Canadian boxer
- Olivier Magnan (born 1986), Canadian ice hockey player
- Olivier Mambwa (born 2008), Swiss footballer
- Olivier Marleix (1971-2025), French politician
- Olivier Martinez (born 1966), French actor
- Olivier Maurault (1886-1968), Canadian historian
- Olivier Megaton (born 1965), French film director, writer and editor born Olivier Fontana
- Olivier Messiaen (1908–1992), French composer, organist and ornithologist
- Olivier Michaud (born 1983), Canadian ice hockey player
- Olivier Morel, French-American documentary filmmaker
- Olivier Muembi (born 1999), Canadian football player
- Olivier Nduhungirehe (born 1975), Rwandan diplomat
- Olivier Nkamhoua (born 2000), Finnish basketball player
- Olivier van Noort (1558–1627), Dutch merchant captain who circumnavigated the world in 1600-01
- Olivier Occéan (born 1981), Canadian soccer player
- Olivier Panis (born 1966), French Formula One driver
- Olivier Peter (born 1986), Swiss lawyer, university teacher and legal activist
- Olivier Patience (born 1980), French tennis player
- Olivier Perrault (1773–1827), seigneur, lawyer, judge and political figure in Lower Canada
- Olivier Pfister, French-American physicist
- Olivier Philippaerts (born 1993), Belgian show jumping rider
- Olivier Pla (born 1981), French racing driver
- Olivier O. Provosty (1852-1924), American jurist
- Olivier Rioux (born 2006), Canadian basketball player
- Olivier Robitaille (1811-1896), Canadian politician
- Olivier Rochon (born 1989), Canadian freestyle skier
- Olivier Rochus (born 1981), Belgian tennis player
- Olivier Rodrigue (born 2000), Canadian ice hockey player
- Olivier Rolin (born 1947), French writer
- Olivier Roy (professor) (born 1949), French political scientist
- Olivier Roy (born 1991), Canadian ice hockey player
- Olivier Sajous (born 1987), Haitian tennis player
- Olivier Sarkozy (born 1969), French banker, half-brother of Nicolas Sarkozy
- Olivier Sedra, Canadian sports announcer
- Olivier Serva (born 1974), French politician
- Olivier Schoenfelder (born 1977), French ice dancer
- Olivier Siegelaar (born 1986), Dutch rower
- Olivier Mahafaly Solonandrasana (born 1964), Malagasy politician, former of the Prime Minister of Madagascar
- Olivier Strebelle (1927–2017), Belgian sculptor
- Olivier Sylvestre (born 1982), Canadian playwright
- Olivier Theyskens (born 1977), Belgian fashion designer
- Olivier Thouin, Canadian violinst
- Olivier Tielemans (born 1984), Dutch race car driver
- Olivier Trudel (1781-1859), Canadian politician
- Olivier Véran (born 1980), French neurologist and politician
- Olivier Vernon (born 1990), American football player
- Olivier Weber (born 1958), French writer, novelist and reporter

== Fictional characters ==
- Oliver (paladin) or Olivier, in the French epic The Song of Roland
- Olivier (comics), a demonic Marvel Comics villain
- Olivier Armstrong, in the Japanese manga series Fullmetal Alchemist
- Oliver B. Bumble, Olivier B. Bommel in Dutch, protagonist in the Dutch comic book series Tom Puss

== See also ==
- Oliver (given name)
