= Oliverio (given name) =

- Pronunciation: Spanish: [/o.li.ˈβe.ɾjo/]
- Gender: Male
- Language: Spanish
- Name day: July 1 (Spain)

Other gender
- Feminine: Oliveria

Origin
- Languages: Latin, Germanic
- Meaning: '"Elf army", "Olive tree"

Other names
- Variant forms: Olivér, Olivier, Oliwer, Oliwier, Olivério, Olivers, Óliver, Oilibhéar, Oilbhreis
- Anglicisation: Oliver
- Related names: Oliver

Oliverio is a Spanish masculine given name form of Oliver. Notable people with the name include:

- Oliverio Lara Borrero (1905-1965), Colombian politician
- Oliverio Castañeda (1955-1978), Guatemalan student activist
- Oliverio Coelho (born 1977), Argentine writer and critic
- Oliverio Jesús Álvarez González (born 1972), Spanish former footballer
- Oliverio Girondo (1891-1967), Argentine poet
- Oliverio Cárdenas (born 1955), Colombian cyclist
- Oliverio Isaza Gómez (1974-2025), Colombian paramilitary and drug trafficker
- Oliverio Martínez (1901-1938), Mexican sculptor
- Oliverio Martínez y Mier (1861-1925), Spanish politician
- Oliverio Muñoz Cabrera, Peruvian politician
- Oliverio Najmias (born 1975), Argentine architect
- Baby Ortiz (Oliverio Ortiz) (1919-1984), Cuban baseball player
- Oliverio Rincón (born 1968), Colombian cyclist
- Oliverio García Rodas (born 1947), Guatemalan politician
- Oliverio Russell (died 1815), Argentine sailor of Scottish descent

== Fictional characters ==
- Oliverio Grajales, a character in the 1952 film Mexican Bus Ride
- Oliverio Rubenales, also known as 'Kid Fideo', a character in the El Chavo de Ocho's spin-off television series El Chapulín Colorado

== See also ==
- Oliver
