= Pittner =

Pittner is a surname. Notable people with the surname include:

- Kurt Pittner (born 1943), Austrian weightlifter
- Marek Pittner (born 1997), Slovak footballer
- Markus Pittner (born 1967), Austrian wrestler
- Olivér Pittner (1911–1971), Hungarian painter

== See also ==
- Pitter (disambiguation)
