= Olivér =

- Pronunciation: Hungarian: [/ˈo.li.veːr/]
- Gender: Male
- Language: Hungarian
- Name day: November 21

Origin
- Languages: Latin, Germanic
- Meaning: '"Elf army", "Olive tree"

Other names
- Variant forms: Auliver (Medieval Italian), Holiver (Medieval Catalan), Oilbhreis (Scottish Gaelic), Oilibhéar (Irish), Oli (Bengali), Oliber (Gascon), Olier (Breton, Canadian French), Olifer (Medieval Latvian, Welsh), Oliu (Languedocian, Gascon), Oliva (Samoan, Tongan), Olivar (Medieval Catalan, Brazilian Portuguese), Ólivar (Faroese), Olivarius (Ancient Germanic), Oliveiros (Galician, Portuguese), Ólíver (Icelandic), Óliver (Icelandic, Spanish), Olīveri (Amharic), Oliverio (Spanish), Olivério (Brazilian Portuguese), Oliveris (Lithuanian), Oliverius (Latin), Olivero (Italian, Spanish), Olivers (Old French, Latvian), Olivier (French, Dutch), Olivièr (Languedocian, Gascon), Olivijer (Dutch), Oliviero (Italian), Olivur (Faroese), Oliwer (Polish), Oliwier (Polish), Olliver (Swedish, Norwegian, Danish, English), Ollyver (American English), Ölu (Bernese German), Olyver (English), Ōriwa (Māori), Ulivieru (Corscian)
- Nicknames: Oli, Olika, Olcsi, Olcsika, Olivérke
- Anglicisation: Oliver
- Popularity: see popular names

Olivér
- Pronunciation: Hungarian: [/ˈo.li.veːr/]
- Gender: Male
- Language: Hungarian

Origin
- Meaning: "Elf army", "Olive tree"

Other names
- See also: Oliver, Olivier, Oliviero, Oliverio, Olivério

Olivér is a Hungarian masculine given name form of Oliver. Notable people with the name include:

- Olivér (died after December 1262), Hungarian prelate
- Olivér Ágh (born 1975), former Hungarian swimmer
- Olivér Almay (1875-1936), Hungarian politician
- Olivér Balázs (born 2004), Hungarian ice hockey player
- Olivér Bánhidi (born 1951), Hungarian chemist
- Olivér Berkes (born 1992), German-born Hungarian singer-songwriter
- Olivér Bethlen (1825-1894), Hungarian soldier and journalist
- Olivér Börcsök (born 1999), Hungarian actor
- Olivér Brachfeld (1908-1967), Hungarian psychologist, historian and translator
- Olivér Csendes (1963-2001), Hungarian actor
- Olivér Dely (1927-2003), Hungarian herpetologist, zoologist and museologist
- Olivér Eöttevényi (1871-1945), Hungarian lawyer and political writer
- Olivér Fenyvesi (born 1992), Hungarian footballer
- Olivér Gaál (1899-1955), Hungarian politician and military personnel
- Olivér Gáspár (born 1973), Hungarian sports shooter
- Olivér Halassy (1909-1946), Hungarian swimmer and water polo player
- Olivér Hollós (born 1946), Hungarian cinematographer
- Olivér Horváth (born 2000), Hungarian footballer
- Olivér Kaposi (1930-1990), Hungarian chemist
- Olivér Kovács (born 1990), Hungarian footballer
- Olivér Kovács (born 1992), Hungarian actor
- Olivér Lábszky (born 1967), Slovak singer and song-writer
- Olivér Láner (1927-1985), Hungarian speleologist
- Olivér Lantos (1917-1981), Hungarian singer
- Olivér Markos (1888-1966), Hungarian lawyer and politician
- Olivér Michl (born 2005), Hungarian racing driver
- Olivér Mihók (born 1993), Hungarian chess grandmaster
- Olivér Mink (born 1970), Hungarian football coach and former player
- Olivér Nagy (1912-2000), Hungarian composer and conductor
- Olivér Nagy (born 1989), Hungarian footballer
- Olivér Nagy (born 2003), Hungarian footballer
- Olivér Narcsa (born 1979), Hungarian comedian, actor and television presenter
- Olivér Nechay (1913-1979), Hungarian chemist and pharmacist
- Olivér Paksi (circa 1300-circa 1366), Hungarian politician and nobleman
- Olivér Pálmás (1902-1968), Hungarian film score composer
- Olivér Papp (born 1975), Hungarian journalist
- Olivér Perge (born 1988), Hungarian speedcuber
- Olivér Pittner (1911-1971), Hungarian painter and newspaper editor
- Olivér Pusztai (born 1981), Hungarian football coach and former player
- Olivér Rácz (1918-1997), Czechoslovak poet, educator, politician, translator and writer
- Olivér Rákos (born 2000), Hungarian actor
- Olivér Rátót (died after 1272), Hungarian nobleman
- Olivér Rupprecht (1858-1942), Hungarian politician
- Olivér Sigmond (1917-1995), Hungarian sculptor and military personnel
- Olivér Sin (born 1985), Hungarian artist
- Olivér Solymossy (1914-1986), Hungarian poet
- Olivér Szlávy (1851-1890), Hungarian politician and lawyer
- Olivér Szőke (born 1995), Hungarian actor
- Olivér Szolnoki (born 1997), Hungarian professional pool player
- Olivér Tamás (born 2001), Hungarian footballer
- Olivér Téchy (1908-1983), Hungarian lawyer and judge
- Olivér Turchányi (1900-1956), Hungarian cinematographer and inventor
- Olivér Turman (1841-1899), Hungarian politician
- Olivér Csaba Varga (born 1988), Hungarian former child voice actor and actor
- Olivér Várhelyi (born 1972), Hungarian lawyer and diplomat
- Olivér Varga (born 1952), former Czechoslovak politician
- Olivér Woracziczky (1885-1965), Hungarian diplomat and aristocrat

== Fictional characters ==
- Olivér Abafi, main protagonist in the Miklós Jósika's 1836 novel Abafi.
- Olivér Császár, character in the Hungarian soap opera series For Better or Worse.
- Olivér Cukor, minor character in the Hungarian soap opera series Barátok közt.
- Olivér Guba, main character in the 2025 Hungarian telenovela series Relatives of Hell.
- Olivér Szarka, minor character in the Hungarian soap opera series Barátok közt.
- Olivér Szendrö, minor character in the Hungarian soap opera series Barátok közt.
- Olivér Várhegyi, character in the Hungarian soap opera series Barátok közt.
- Olivér Zámori, character in the Hungarian soap opera series For Better or Worse.

== See also ==
- Oliver
