= Mirchev =

Mirchev (Bulgarian: Мирчев) is a Bulgarian masculine surname, its feminine counterpart is Mircheva. It may refer to

- Konstantin Mirchev (born 1978), Bulgarian footballer
- Militsa Mircheva (born 1994), Bulgarian long-distance runner
- Svetlana Mircheva (born 1976), Bulgarian artist
- Vasil Mirchev (1927–2003), Bulgarian film director
- Videlina Mircheva (born 1978), Bulgarian singer-songwriter
- Vladislav Mirchev (born 1987), Bulgarian footballer
