= Olivério =

- Pronunciation: Brazilian Portuguese: [/o.liˈvɛ.ɾi.u/], European Portuguese: [/ɔ.liˈvɛ.ɾju/]
- Gender: Male
- Language: Portuguese

Other gender
- Feminine: Olivéria

Origin
- Meaning: "Elf army" and "Olive tree"

Other names
- Variant forms: Oliverio (Spanish), Oliviero (Italian), Olivér (Hungarian)
- Anglicisation: Oliver
- Related names: Olivér, Olivier

Olivério is a Portuguese masculine given name form of Oliver. Notable people with the name include:

- Olivério Bazzani Filho (1935–2007), known as Bazzani, Brazilian footballer and football coach
- Olivério Ferreira (1923–2009), known as Xangô da Mangueira, Brazilian singer and songwriter
- Olivério Ortiz (1789–1869), Brazilian politician and military personnel
- Olivério Pinto (1896–1981), Brazilian zoologist and physician
- Olivério Popovitch (1911–1973), Brazilian rower

== See also ==
- Oliverio
- Olivér
- Oliver
- Oliviero
