= Vighi =

Vighi is a surname. Notable people with the surname include:

- Coriolano Vighi (1846–1905), Italian painter
- Giacomo Vighi(1510–1570), Italian painter
