= Bartolomeo Coriolano =

Italian engraver

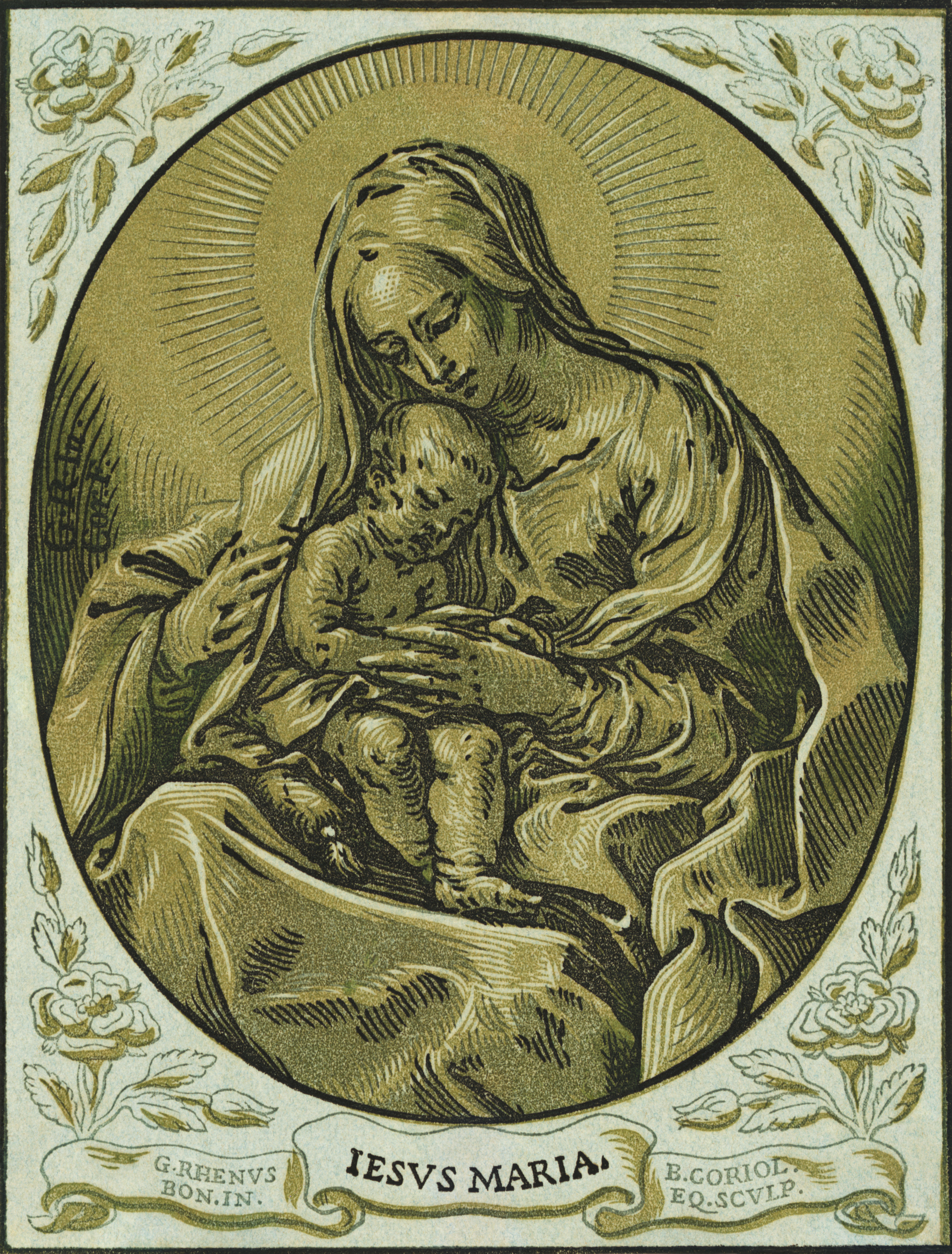
Chiaroscuro woodcut of the Virgin and Child by Bartolommeo Coriolano, between 1630 and 1655. Digitally restored.

Bartolommeo Coriolano (1590 or 1599–1676, pronunciation ko-ree-o-lă'no and sometimes spelled Coriolanus) was an Italian printmaker during the Baroque period, mainly in colour woodcuts. His father, Cristoforo Coriolano, and brother, Giovanni Battista Coriolano were also woodcut printmakers, although there is some doubt over the actual relationship between Cristoforo and Bartolommeo Coriolano. Coriolano had a daughter, Teresa Maria Coriolano, who later became a painter and engraver.

Coriolano trained under the painter Guido Reni and based many of his woodcuts on the work of his teacher as reproductive prints, as was common. He was successful and popular, though not an innovator in the technique. Eventually, he came to the attention of Pope Urban VII who granted Coriolano knighthood, as a "Roman count", and a pension. Coriolano's works are the most celebrated of the works produced by the Coriolano family.

== Biography ==
Coriolano was born in Bologna in either 1590 or 1599, the son of Cristoforo Coriolano. He, like his brother Giambattista (born 1595 or 1589 and died 8 January 1649) became wood engravers like their father. Originally from Nuremberg, their father had moved to Venice and changed the family name to Lederer. His father died at Venice in 1600. With such a distance between Coriolano's first work, 1627, and the death of his father, the relationship of father and son is questionable. This is compounded by his father's career with Giorgio Vasari in 1568, making his father of a considerable age when Coriolano was born.

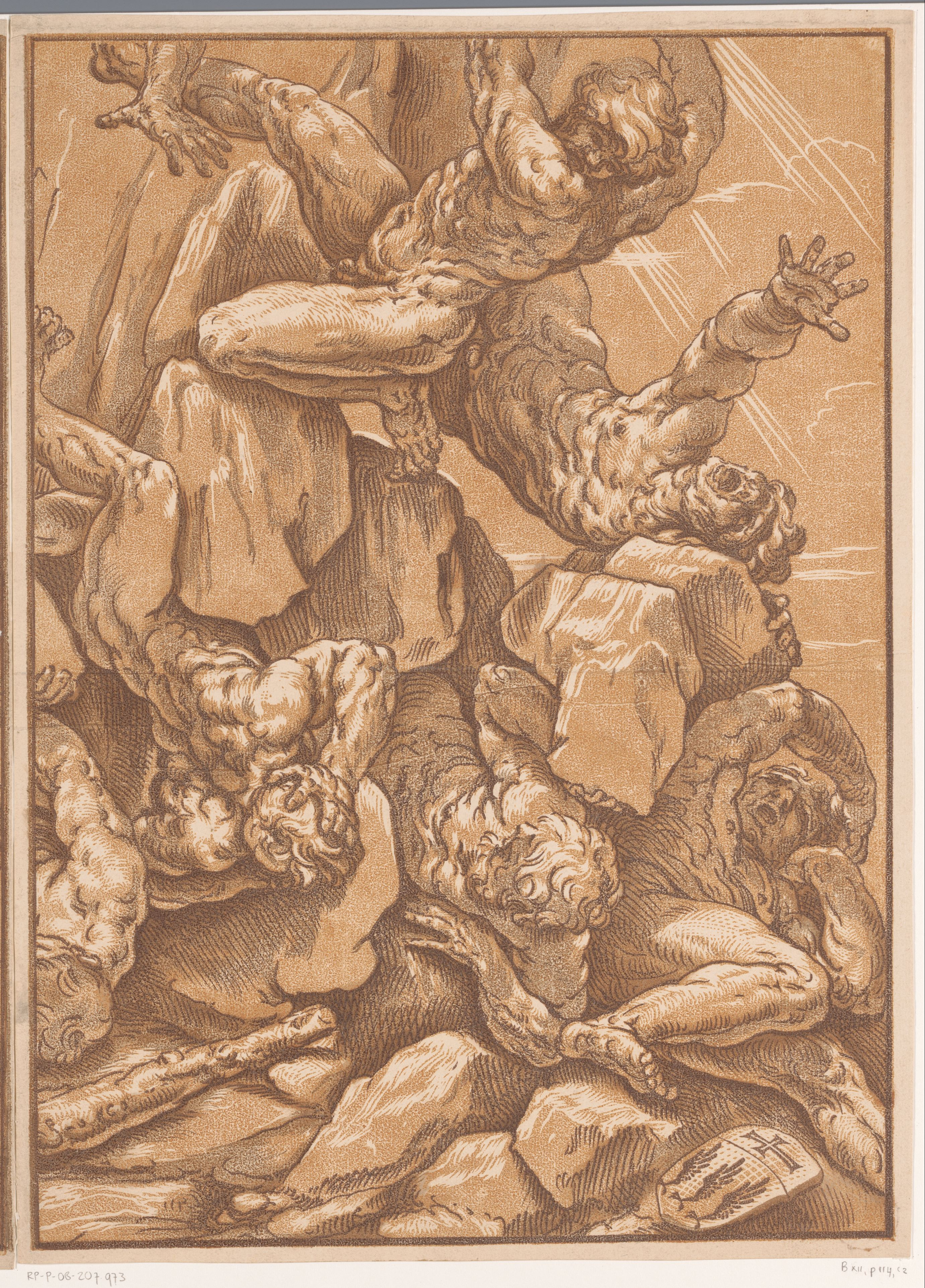
Fall of the Giants, 1647

He was first instructed by his father at the Academy of the Incamminati, of the Carracci, at Bologna. He afterwards became a pupil of Reni, in whose studio he learned woodblock cutting. After the successful woodblock printer Andrea Andreani died, Coriolano took his place. He worked at Bologna from 1630 to 1647, and was fond of developing the designs of Reni and Guercino.

His success at imitating Reni brought him to the attention of Pope Urban VIII. A set of his prints after Carracci, Reni, and others was dedicated to Urban VIII, and Coriolano provided the pope with a print of the Madonna; the pope granted him a salary and brought Coriolano into the Knighthood of Loreto (with the title Cavaliere di Loreto). During this time, he called himself Romanus Eques, "Roman knight", which refers to his knighthood. Coriolano had a daughter, Theresa Maria Coriolano, who was also an engraver and painter.

== Works ==
Coriolano's artistic works are the most celebrated works by the members of the Coriolano family, dating from 1627 to 1647. He, like his brother, produced chiaroscuro woodcuts using two blocks for their prints in a German manner. His style was close to the German use of black for outlines and brown for the tints. He usually made use of two blocks for his woodcuts; on one he cut the outline and the dark shadows, like the hatchings of a pen, and on the other block the demi-tinte, or "halftones". Coriolano's prints brought great recognition even though he contributed nothing new to the technique that he used.

Many artists during Coriolano's time relied on aspects of Reni's works, his style or his actual designs, in producing their own work. Coriolano, in particular, would base many of his woodcut designs on Reni's works. An example of this is Coriolano's Salome with the Head of the Baptist (1631). His major works include St Jerome in Meditation Before a Crucifix, Herodias with the Head of the Baptist, and The Virgin, with the Infant Sleeping. Other important works by Coriolano include The Fall of Giants (1638), a four sheet work that is 32 inches by 23 inches, The Four Sibyls, Peace and Abundance (1642), Jupiter Hurling Bolts at the Giants (1647) and The Seven Ages.

His work is held in many museums worldwide:

Denmark
- National Gallery of Denmark

France

- Bibliothèque nationale de France,

Hungary

- Museum of Fine Arts, Budapest

Japan

- National Museum of Western Art in Tokyo

New Zealand

- Auckland Art Gallery Toi o Tāmaki

Spain

- Biblioteca Nacional de España

USA

- Worcester Art Museum
- Fralin Museum of Art
- Bowdoin College Museum of Art
- Minneapolis Institute of Art
- Los Angeles County Museum of Art
- Detroit Institute of Arts
- Museum of Fine Arts, Boston
- Museum of Fine Arts, Houston
- John and Mable Ringling Museum of Art
- Smart Museum of Art
- Blanton Museum of Art
- University of Michigan Museum of Art
- Metropolitan Museum of Art
- Art Institute of Chicago
- National Gallery of Art

UK

- Ashmolean Museum,
- Royal Collection Trust
- British Museum
