= Oilibhéar =

- Pronunciation: Irish: [ˈɔlʲəvʲeːɾˠ] Ulster Irish: [ˈɔlʲəvʲaɾˠ]
- Gender: Male
- Language: Irish
- Name day: November 12

Origin
- Languages: Latin, Germanic
- Meaning: '"Elf army", "Olive tree"

Other names
- Variant forms: Oilbhreis (Scottish Gaelic), Olifer (Welsh)
- Cognate: Oilibhéir
- Anglicisation: Oliver
- Related names: Olivér, Olivier, Oliviero

Oilibhéar is an Irish masculine given name form of Oliver.

Notable people with the name include:

- Oilibhéar Báicéir (born 1974), Irish hurler
- Oilibhéar Brádaigh, Irish Gaelic footballer
- Oilibhéar Breathnach (born 1992), Irish hurler
- Oilibhéar Breathnach (1937-2016), Irish hurler
- Oilibhéar Cainín (born 1976), Irish hurler
- Olibhéar Coileáin (born 1972), Northern Irish hurler
- Oilibhéar Conchúir (born 1975), Irish hurler
- Oilibhéar Criú (1947-2020), Northern Irish Gaelic footballer
- Oilibhéar Crionagáin (born 1947), Irish Gaelic footballer
- Oilibhéar Croiligh (1940-2025), Irish scholar and priest
- Oilibhéar Fathaigh (born 1975), Irish hurler
- Oilibhéar Mac Giolla Mhuire (1947-2025), Irish Gaelic footballer
- Oilibhéar Mag Eochaidh (1935-2020), Irish hurler
- Oilibhéar Mac Seanlaoich (born 1943), Irish Gaelic footballer
- Olibhéar Mac Craith (born 1938), Irish hurler
- Olibhéar Moráin (born 1975), Irish hurler
- Oilibhéar Murchú, Irish Gaelic footballer
- Oilibhéar Pluincéid (1629-1681), Irish archbishop, martyr and saint
- Oilibhéar Raghallaigh (1936-2009), Irish Gaelic footballer

== See also ==
- Oilbhreis
- Oliver
