= Pitter =

Pitter can refer to:

- 48785 Pitter, main-belt asteroid
- Aslie Pitter MBE, British footballer
- Cherry pitter, a device to remove pits from cherries
- Premysl Pitter, Czech pedagogue and humanist
- René Pitter, Austrian footballer
- Ruth Pitter, British poet
- Shane Pitter (born 1999), Jamaican bobsledder
