= Giovanni Valesio =

Italian painter and engraver (c. 1583–1633)

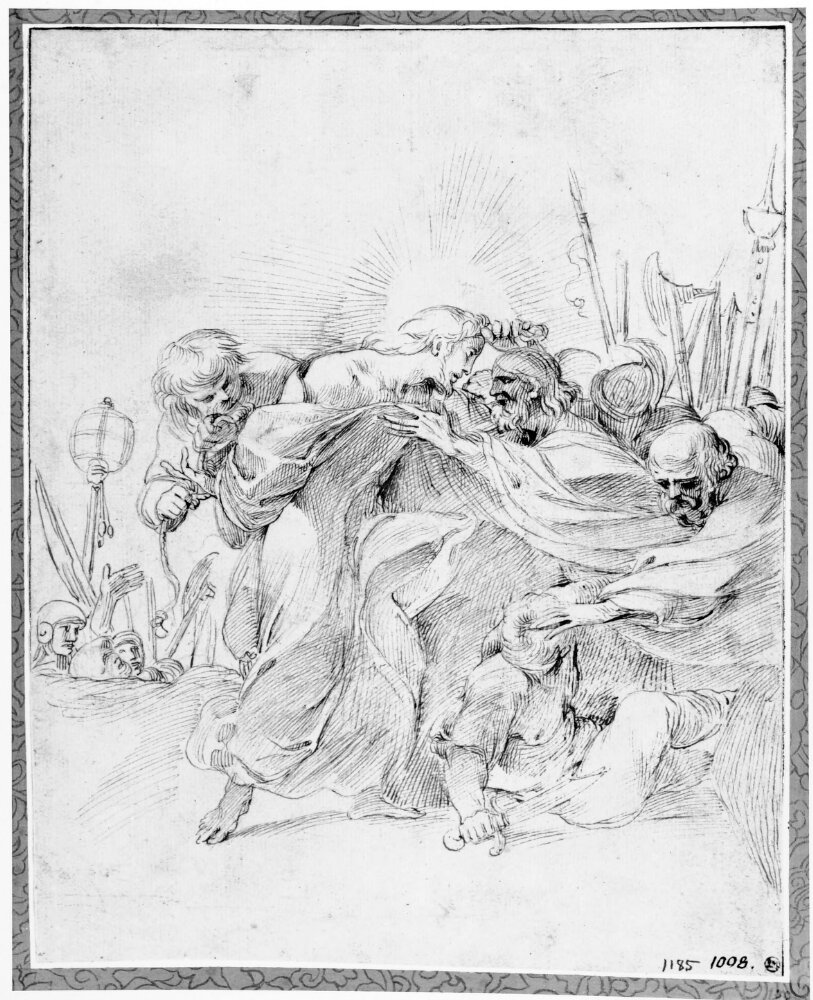
Arrest of Christ, drawing by Valesio

Giovanni Luigi Valesio, also known as Giovanni Valesio or Luigi Valesio, (c. 1583–1633) was an Italian painter and, most prominently, an engraver of the early-Baroque, active in his native city of Bologna, and then in Rome.

== Biography ==
Malvasia claims he was the son of a Spanish soldier initially stationed in Reggio Calabria. He frequented the studio of Ludovico Carracci. After 1621, during the papacy of Gregory XV, Valesio relocated to Rome under the patronage of Lavinia Albergati, the wife of Orazio Ludovisi, the pope's brother. He helped Ulisse Aldrovandi in the preparation of some of his volumes of natural history. He was aided by a pupil, Giovanni Battista Coriolano. He also engraved the funeral services in Bologna performed for the Ludovisi pope. Another pupil was Oliviero Gatti of Piacenza. Valesio died in his mid-forties according to Malvasia.

Among his works in Bologna are a Scourging of Christ for the cathedral, an Annunciation for the Mendicants; church, and St. Roch curing the Plague-stricken for the oratory of St. Roch (San Rocco). At Rome he painted a Religion for the monastery attached to Santa Maria sopra Minerva. He etched several plates from his own designs, and after other masters, as well as a variety of plates for books. In these he approached the style of Agostino Carracci. Among other prints by him of St. Michael vanquishing the Angels after Paolo Veronese.
