= Olivier Beauchet =

Canadian physician-scientist

- Occupation(s): Physician, professor, researcher

Olivier Beauchet is a physician, Professor of Medicine, and Joseph Kaufman Chair in Geriatric Medicine at McGill University in Montreal, Quebec, Canada. He was also appointed Director of the Centre of Excellence on Longevity at McGill University and is a senior investigator at the Lady Davis Institute for Medical Research.

== Biography ==
He is a specialist physician certified in neurology, internal medicine, and geriatrics. He also holds Master's degrees in pharmacology and neuropsychology, as well as a Doctorate (Ph.D.) in Human motricity and handicap.

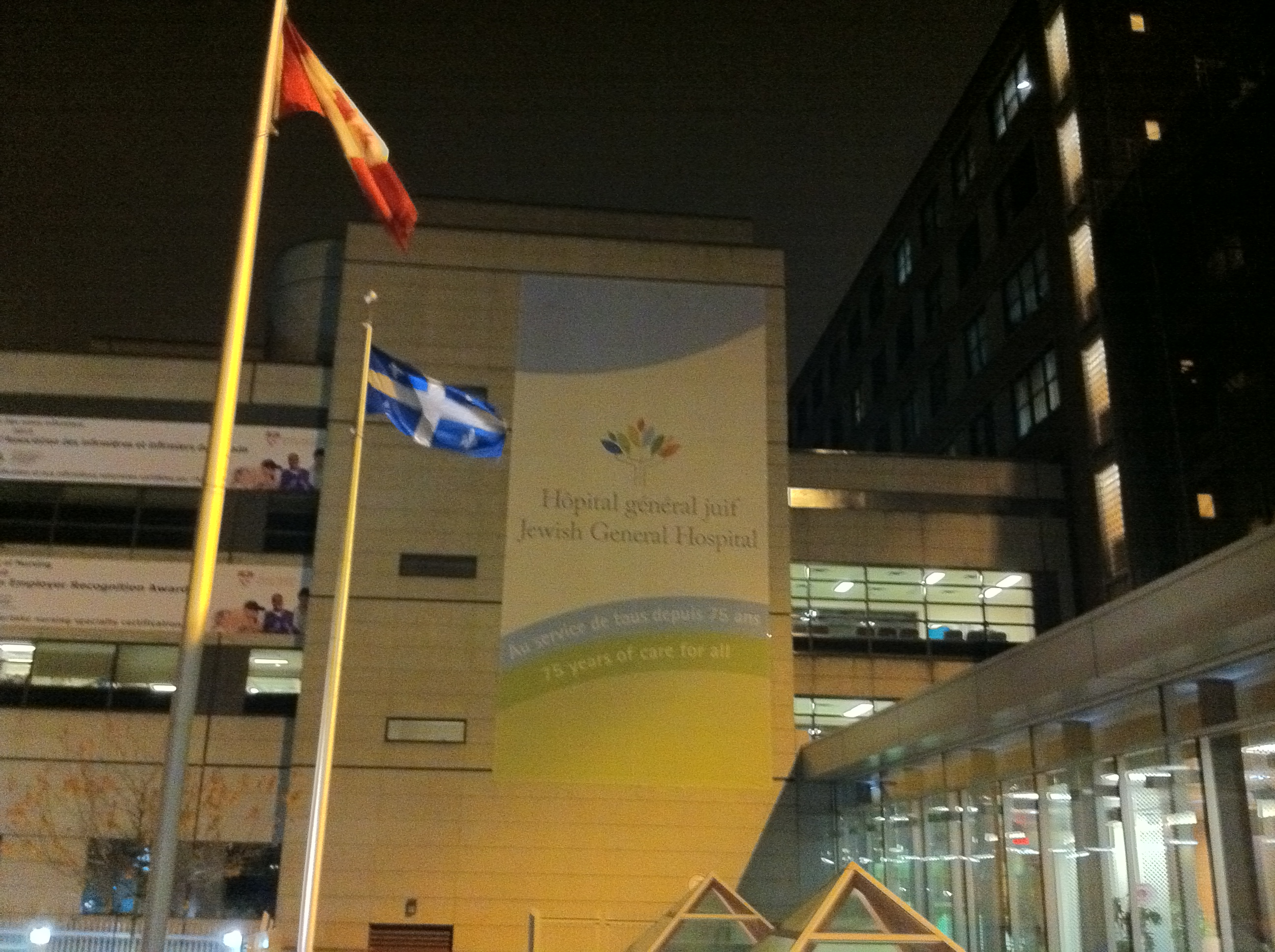
Jewish General Hospital in Montreal, Quebec

After working in France for well over a decade, he moved to Montreal and became a physician member of the Division of Geriatric Medicine at the Jewish General Hospital, as well as a senior investigator in its research institute, the Lady Davis Institute for Medical Research.

He is a Full Professor of Medicine, in the Divisions of Geriatric Medicine and Experimental Medicine at McGill University since 2015, and in September 2015, he was awarded the Joseph Kaufman Chair in Geriatric Medicine.

He co-presides the Quebec Committee on the implantation and monitoring for the proper use of antipsychotic drugs amongst the elderly in nursing homes (CHSLD) across the province.

He founded and is the current chief executive officer of Biomathics, an international research consortium on biomathematics applied to human systems modeling. Additionally, he is the founder and current president of the Canadian Gait Consortium, which is a pan-Canadian network of clinicians and researchers working on gait disorders.

In 2018, he was the presided the Scientific Committee of the Canadian Geriatrics Society Congress in Montreal.

He is also an active member of the Arts & Health Commission of the Montreal Museum of Fine Arts, where he conducted a study confirming that museums can be important actors in illness prevention, particularly amongst the elderly.

== Research ==
His research focuses mostly on mobility and cognitive decline with aging.
