= Theresa Maria Coriolano =

Italian artist (1620–1671)

Theresa Maria Coriolano (1620–1671) was an Italian engraver of the Baroque period.

Coriolano was born in Bologna, the daughter of the engraver Bartolommeo Coriolano, and was instructed in painting by Elisabetta Sirani. She etched a small plate of the Virgin, half-length, with the Infant Jesus.
