= Olivier Peter =

Swiss lawyer (born 1986)

- Born: Olivier Peter; 20 January 1986 (age 40); Zurich; Switzerland
- Citizenship: Switzerland
- Education: University of Geneva
- Occupations: Lawyer; International lawyer
- Employer(s): Interdroit; Peter & Moreau
- Organization(s): Association of Progressive Lawyers; Swiss Society of International Law; Swiss Society of Criminal Law; Swiss Society of Jurists
- Known for: Del Río Prada v. Spain; Portu Juanenea and Sarasola Yarzabal v. Spain; Trial of Catalonia independence leaders
- Board member of: World Organisation Against Torture; Council of Europe Network on Legal Assistance to Victims of Trafficking in Human Beings
- Website: https://www.petermoreau.ch/en/

Olivier Peter (born 20 January 1986) is a Swiss lawyer specialising in human rights, international criminal law and extradition.

He is involved in cases relating to fundamental freedoms, the rights of detainees, and the defence of activists, both in Switzerland and before international jurisdictions.

== Early life and education ==
Olivier Peter grew up in Ticino and studied law at the University of Geneva, where he obtained a Bachelor of Laws in 2011. He was admitted to the Swiss bar in 2014.

== Career ==
Peter, along with Swiss lawyer Raphaël Roux, co-founded the law firm Interdroit in Genève. He subsequently founded the Peter & Moreau law firm with French lawyer Céline Moreau, where he works as a partner.

=== Torture and ill-treatment ===
Peter has represented victims of torture before international bodies, with a particular focus on cases involving Spain. He is a member of the Executive Council of the World Organisation Against Torture.

In 2013, he acted as counsel in Del Río Prada v. Spain before the European Court of Human Rights, successfully challenging the so-called Parot doctrine, which had unlawfully extended the sentences of prisoners who had already served their term. The Grand Chamber's ruling led to the release of dozens of detainees.

In 2016-17, Peter represented Nekane Txapartegi, a Basque activist whose conviction had been obtained on the basis of confessions she alleged were extracted under torture. He secured her release after eighteen months of detention by obtaining a ruling from the Spanish Audiencia Nacional that her sentence had lapsed by prescription.

In 2018, he obtained a judgment in Portu Juanenea and Sarasola Yarzabal v. Spain, in which the Court found Spain responsible for degrading and inhuman treatment by the Civil Guard.

In 2025, he represented Raúl Fuentes before the United Nations Committee Against Torture (CAT), which found that Spain had failed to investigate credible evidence of torture dating back to 1991, and reminded the Spanish state that torture is an imprescriptible offence under international law.

Across these and related cases, Peter has obtained a total of six favorable judgments from the European Court of Human Rights finding violations of Article 3 of the Convention in cases involving torture or ill-treatment.

=== Freedom of assembly ===
Peter has represented clients in several cases concerning freedom of assembly and the right to protest, including the following.

He acted for the Collectif de la Grève féministe of Neuchâtel in a case brought before the Federal Tribunal challenging a ban on a feminist march route on 14 June 2023, arguing that restrictions on protest routes must be grounded in formal democratic legislation rather than executive police regulations. Following a first ruling by the Federal Tribunal in favour of the collective, the City of Neuchâtel and the collective reached a negotiated agreement in August 2025, with the City committing to guarantee the right to demonstrate peacefully, bringing the proceedings to an end.

He also represented the Communauté genevoise d'action syndicale (CGAS) before the European Court of Human Rights in a case concerning the prohibition of public demonstrations in Geneva during the COVID-19 pandemic in 2020, after the Swiss Federal Council banned all public gatherings from 16 March of that year. In March 2022, the Court's Third Section found that the blanket ban constituted a disproportionate interference with the right to freedom of peaceful assembly under Article 11 of the European Convention on Human Rights — the first time the Court had found fault with pandemic-era government measures. Following a referral requested by Switzerland, the Grand Chamber declared the application inadmissible in November 2023 on procedural grounds, finding that the CGAS had not exhausted domestic remedies before bringing its complaint to Strasbourg.

In 2026, Peter, alongside lawyers Jan Fermon and Emma Liden, successfully obtained the acquittal of five members of the Collectif Urgence Palestine before the Geneva Police Court, which annulled sixteen fines totalling 6,400 Swiss francs issued for participation in unauthorised gatherings between 2023 and 2024. The court, while not accepting the defence of necessity, found that a genocide was "probably underway" in Gaza during the relevant period and emphasised the peaceful nature of the protests, a ruling Peter described as "a victory on all fronts."

=== Civil and political rights ===
Olivier Peter has represented clients in a number of politically sensitive cases, including the following.

He represented Jordi Cuixart, president of the Catalan cultural organization Òmnium Cultural, alongside Catalan lawyer Benet Salellas, following Cuixart's prosecution in Spain. Together, they pursued Cuixart's defence before both the United Nations Human Rights mechanisms and the European Court of Human Rights, arguing that his detention violated fundamental rights including freedom of expression, freedom of assembly and the right to political participation.

In 2018, Peter obtained a ruling against Spain in Otegi Mondragon and Others v. Spain before the European Court of Human Rights, representing Arnaldo Otegi Mondragón, a prominent Basque political figure, along with three co-applicants. The Court found a violation of Article 6 of the European Convention on Human Rights, holding that the applicants had not received a fair trial before an impartial tribunal in proceedings brought against them in Spain.

He also took on the legal defense of former Catalan MP Anna Gabriel, successfully opposing her extradition from Switzerland on the grounds that the charges against her were of a political nature.

In 2025, Peter defended Caroline Meijers, president of the Mouvement jurassien de soutien aux sans-papiers, who had been prosecuted for allegedly harbouring a Syrian asylum seeker subject to a removal order. The court in Porrentruy acquitted Meijers on all charges, finding that the elements required for a conviction had not been established.

=== Trafficking in human beings and labour exploitation ===
Peter has represented victims of human trafficking and labour exploitation in proceedings before Swiss and international bodies and is a member of the Council of Europe Network of Anti-Trafficking Lawyers and NGOs.

In a landmark case before the Geneva Criminal Court, Peter represented Macedonian construction workers exploited on several Geneva building sites. The contractor was sentenced to seven and a half years in prison for human trafficking, while his Swiss accountant, who had served as a front man for the operation, was also convicted — an outcome that Swiss prosecutors had consistently avoided in similar cases, and which Peter described as setting a new standard for prosecuting intermediaries in human trafficking cases.

In 2024, he acted for one of the plaintiffs in proceedings alleging labour exploitation and human trafficking against several members of the Hinduja family, one of the United Kingdom's wealthiest families. The civil case was subsequently settled out of court.

=== Asylum and migrants' rights ===
Peter has represented clients in cases concerning asylum, migration and international human rights protection.

Alongside lawyer Stéphanie Motz, Peter successfully challenged Switzerland's refusal to grant asylum to an Iranian national on the grounds of his sexual orientation, a case brought before the European Court of Human Rights.

Peter also represented the fathers of two Swiss girls who had been held in the Roj camp in northeastern Syria after their mother brought them to join the Islamic State in 2016. Following sustained pressure from Peter and United Nations human rights experts, Switzerland repatriated the two girls to Geneva in December 2021. Peter argued that children held in such camps should be treated as victims of trauma rather than security risks, and called on Switzerland to extend its repatriation policy more broadly.

In 2025, he represented Al-Sharigy, a Libyan national and victim of gender-based violence, before the United Nations CEDAW Committee, arguing that Libya had failed in its obligation to protect her from domestic violence and forced displacement.

=== Emerging rights ===
Peter has litigated cases touching on LGBTQ+ rights, animal rights activists, victims of police violence, environmental activists and parental rights.

LGBTQ+ rights

In 2019, he represented a waiter subjected to homophobic harassment in his workplace before the Swiss Federal Tribunal, which admitted the appeal and established that repeated homophobic conduct in the workplace constitutes not merely an insult but potentially a serious criminal offence, adopting the European Court of Human Rights' requirement that authorities investigate the discriminatory motive in any credible allegation of homophobic conduct.

Animal rights activists

He acted for Virginia Markus, an animal rights activist prosecuted in Switzerland, and brought the case of G.K. v. Switzerland before the European Court of Human Rights, concerning the right of a prisoner to a vegan diet.

Peter is a member of The Vegan Society’s International Rights Network, aiming at gaining international legal recognition of veganism.

Police violence

Peter, alongside lawyers Céline Moreau and Lucie Simon, represented Laurent Théron, a trade unionist blinded in one eye by a police officer during a 2016 demonstration against the French labour law reform.

Following the acquittal of the officer responsible, they brought the case before the European Court of Human Rights in 2023 under Article 3 of the European Convention on Human Rights, which prohibits torture and inhuman or degrading treatment. The Court opened proceedings against France, questioning both whether Théron had been subjected to treatment contrary to Article 3 and whether the French authorities had conducted an adequate investigation.

Environmental rights activists

Peter has acted as defence counsel in several landmark cases involving environmental and climate activists prosecuted for civil disobedience in Switzerland.

He represented activists from the ZAD du Mormont, a protest occupation established to oppose the expansion of the Holcim cement quarry in the canton of Vaud, who had been sentenced by Vaud cantonal courts to up to three months in prison despite refusing to identify themselves to authorities. In 2023, the Swiss Federal Tribunal annulled those convictions, ruling that every accused person has an absolute right to defend themselves before a court, and ordered the Canton of Vaud to compensate each activist.

In 2022, Peter also successfully obtained the acquittal on appeal of fourteen climate activists in Geneva who had been prosecuted for participating in unauthorised demonstrations, including a protest outside a Credit Suisse branch against the bank's fossil fuel investments. The Geneva Court of Appeal emphasised the peaceful nature of the demonstrations, with Peter and co-counsel arguing that the public prosecutor's policy of fining peaceful demonstrators for mere participation in unauthorised protests was incompatible with international human rights law.

Parental rights and child protection

Peter successfully challenged a Swiss court’s decision to remove a mother's custody of her son without hearing her or allowing any appeal before the European Court of Human Rights. In a 2026 judgement, the Court found Switzerland in violation of Article 8 of the Convention, guaranteeing the right to respect for family life.

He also represented Verónica Saldaña, a Spanish mother who had fled to Switzerland with her twin sons to escape domestic violence, in proceedings under the Hague Convention on international child abduction. In 2023, the Swiss Federal Tribunal dismissed the father's appeal, allowing the twins to remain in Switzerland with their mother.

== Publications ==
Olivier Peter’s publications primarily focus on legal advocacy, constitutional rights, and issues related to asylum, discrimination, and civil liberties.

- Amnistía. Propuestas para un debate necesario. Manresa: Tigre de Papel Ediciones, 2021.

This book discusses the concept of amnesty as a legal and political instrument.

- Alimentation et droits des personnes détenues : analyse dans la perspective du droit européen, Revue trimestrielle des droits de l’homme, no. 93, January 2013, pp. 97–121.

The article examines how the European human rights framework requires states to ensure adequate and adapted food provision in detention in order to protect prisoners’ dignity and fundamental rights.

- L'antispécisme, une conviction protégée ?, Plaidoyer, 2020. (with Claire Camblain)

The article examines the extent to which anti-speciesist beliefs may benefit from legal protection under Swiss law, particularly in criminal proceedings involving activists.

- Liberté de réunion à Genève : mauvaises pratiques et bonnes jurisprudences, Plaidoyer, 2019

The paper discusses how Geneva's law on public demonstrations unduly restricts the right to protest, and how cantonal courts have pushed back by refusing to validate those restrictions.

- Droit à la défense d'office du prévenu indigent, Plaidoyer, 2017

The article critically examines the Geneva Public Prosecutor's practice of granting court-appointed defence counsel to indigent defendants, assessing its compliance with Swiss law and the European Court of Human Rights' case law.

- Enquête effective en cas de mauvais traitements sur une personne en détention, Plaidoyer, 2012 (written as a doctoral researcher at the University of Geneva)

The article surveys the European Court of Human Rights' case law on ill-treatment in custody, setting out the procedural standards that investigators must meet and defenders may invoke when such allegations arise.
