= Olivier Pfister =

US physicist

- Education: Université Sorbonne-Paris-Nord (Ph.D.)
- Scientific career
- Thesis: Étude expérimentale et théorique des interactions hyperfines dans la bande de vibration v3 de la molécule 28SiF4 (1993)
- Doctoral advisor: Christian Chardonnet

Olivier Pfister is a US physicist, professor of Experimental Atomic, Molecular, and Optical Physics at the University of Virginia. He obtained his doctorate in physics in 1993 at Paris 13 University. Olivier Pfister also specializes in the fields of Quantum Fields and Quantum Information.
