= Olivier Ganthier =

Haitian Neo Pop artist and designer

Olivier Arsene Ganthier, also known as OliGa, is a Haitian Neo Pop artist and designer.

== Career ==
Ganthier's figurative work includes portraits, afro-pop characters, and motifs inspired by tropical settings, urban life, as well as his Afro-Caribbean culture. His art aims to spread happiness, peace, love, and success. Most of his characters are his own creations while others are mixed versions of existing pop culture icons.

OliGa's works are made from various media including spray paint, digital art (painting), acrylics paint, and markers.

OliGa has collaborated with various companies including Lyft, Macmillan, and Unilever (Culture Republic), and has painted an Art car with Mazda for Auto Expo Haiti. His work has also been exhibited in galleries, fairs and has been held in the permanent collection of the US Embassy in Haiti. He has made custom artworks for individual celebrities including Colombian reggaeton singer J Balvin, Afro singer Mr Eazi, tennis player Naomi Osaka, and comedian Rachid Badouri.

In Haiti he launched a #tireartchallenge, an art alternative to violent protest and tire burning. He co-launched the first Haitian Street art and Graffiti Festival "Festi Graffiti", followed with graffiti and stencil classes at Le Centre d'Art de Haïti. He has been part of Street Art Residence in California, and Painted Mural in Wynwood Art. His work has been part of art auctions with Paddle 8 and The Art Plug. Between Haiti and Miami he works on illustrations for books, acrylic paintings, digital art on canvas, and street art murals while also collaborating commercially with brands and companies, predominantly on limited edition clothing, custom art, and other products.
