= Barátok közt =

Hungarian television soap opera

- Genre: Soap opera
- Created by: István Márton; Tamás Aradi; István Labancz; Miklós Varga
- Starring: Izabella Varga; Edit Ábrahám; Csaba Tihanyi-Tóth; András Várkonyi; Károly Rékasi; Zoltán Szőke
- Opening theme: Új élet vár
- Country of origin: Hungary
- Original language: Hungarian
- No. of seasons: 23
- No. of episodes: 10,456

Production
- Producer: Ilona Ondruss
- Running time: 15 minutes
- Production company: Grundy Television

Original release
- Network: RTL Klub
- Release: 26 October 1998 – 17 July 2021

Barátok közt (Hungarian pronunciation: [ˈbɒraːtok ˈkøst], English: Among Friends) was a Hungarian television soap opera aired on RTL Klub. It premiered on 26 October 1998 and ran for 23 seasons. The final episode aired on 17 July 2021.

Throughout its entire run, the series was broadcast every weekday, with two 15-minute episodes each night. During most of its run, Barátok közt was among the most watched regular television programs domestically in Hungary, with around 1.2 million viewers per night.

On 30 November 2020, in the wake of declining ratings, RTL Klub announced that the winter 2021 season would be the final season, bringing to an end the soap after 23 seasons and more than 10 000 episodes. The soap ended with a grand finale which aired in prime time, instead of its usual early evening slot, and ran for 40 minutes.

== Synopsis ==
The series takes place at the fictional Mátyás király tér (King Matthias Square) in Budapest and depicts the life of the people living here, including the Berényi family and their family business. In the series premiere the oldest Berényi brother, Zoltán Berényi dies and leaves his company to his wife, Claudia Berényi, his two younger brothers, Miklós and András Berényi (died in 2012), Miklós’ wife, Nóra Balogh (divorced in 2002, 2005 and 2009), András's (future ex) wife, Zsuzsa Berényi, his friend, László Novák, and his life partner, Gabriella Juhász (broke up in 1999, together again between 2011 and 2012).
