= Olivier Boissiere =

Olivier Boissiere (born 1939, date of death unknown) was a French writer and commentator of contemporary art and architecture. His profiles, comments, features and interviews had been published in international magazines such as Domus, Abitare, L'Architecture d'Aujourd'hui and Vogue Paris. Boissiere was the author of several books about the works of Jean Nouvel, Frank Gehry, Le Corbusier, Ron Arad and Philippe Starck. He was on Jean Nouvel's team for more than ten years and served as an advisor and consultant to different architecture projects such as the winning entry of the team Sou Fujimoto+Manal Rachdi for the "Reinventer Paris" competition.

As an assistant and neophyte of art critic Pierre Restany, Boissière witnessed the emerging of the avant-garde in the Sixties with Yves Klein, Raymond Hains, Cy Twombly, Christo and others, who held their exhibitions in Galerie J in Paris. Later his interests shifted to modern European and American architecture. He was close to the early Frank Gehry and familiar with the Californian art scene in the Seventies, privileged to encounter great artists such as Ed Ruscha, Larry Bell and Donald Judd. A close friend of Lewis Baltz, he kept strong bonds with the French art scene as a familiar of Sophie Calle, Jean Charles Blais, Daniel Buren, Bertrand Lavier, Olivier Mosset and Bernard Frize. A modest art collector himself, Boissiere gathered his collection along with some new discoveries in his Un Cabinet d'Amateur in Sofia, devoted to Bulgarian and foreign contemporary art.

== 1960s – Nouveaux Réalistes, Pop and Minimal art ==
Boissiere's introduction to the arts started from Gallerie J in Paris, where he worked as an assistant to Jeanine de Goldschmidt and art critic Pierre Restany. It was the home of the Nouveaux Réalistes - an artistic movement, founded by Restany together with Yves Klein, Arman, Raymond Hains and others. The gallery did present the first exhibition of Cy Twombly in Paris, the famous Daniel Spoerri dinners and the oil barrels of Christo on Rue Visconti. During this period Boissiere witnessed the opening of the first Ileana Sonnabend gallery in Paris, where American Pop art artists such as Andy Warhol and Roy Lichtenstein were introduced in Europe for the first time.

== 1970s – Young Americans and Frank Gehry ==
After being a partner in Atelier A, a short lived venture where artists like Arman and Robert Malaval designed objects and artefacts, Boissiere was cooped in a small institution under the French ministry of industry to take part in a program promoting French design. He did attend and reported about international design congresses in Moscow, Kyoto, Vancouver, Aspen and Berlin. Soon he was appointed an editor of Architecture Intérieure Cree Magazine, where he introduced the young lions challenging the International style who were at that time Archigram, Cedric Price, Renzo Piano, Norman Foster, the Radical architecture in Italy, the American “Post-moderns” after the provoking Learning from Las Vegas, the architectural theories of Aldo Rossi, Lucien Kroll, the works of Gordon Matta Clark. In the US Olivier Boissière did multiple coast to coast trips, documenting the works of Frank Lloyd Wright or following the steps of art historian Aby Warburg, who had visited the world of the Hopis in Arizona at beginning of the century. At the eve of his journalistic career, he had encounters with Zaha Hadid, still a student of the Architectural Association, Tomas Maldonado, Buckminster Fuller, Philip Johnson, Jonas Salk and Frank Gehry. Back in Europe he was fortunate to attend the first great exhibitions by curator Harald Szeemann, the Bachelors Machines at UCAD in Paris and dokumenta V in Kassel with works by Beuys, Kienholz and Bruce Nauman.

== 1980s – travelling with art and architecture, Lewis Baltz ==
Spanning his life between Paris, Milan and Los Angeles, Olivier Boissiere became a regular culture and architecture writer for Domus, L'Architecture d'Aujourd'hui, Le Monde and some Condé Nast magazines such as Vogue, where he collaborated with photographer Donatella Brun. His journalistic travels ranged from accompanying Frank Gehry to the reception of his Gerit Rietweld Award in Utrecht through meeting Luis Barragán in Mexico, from paying visits to the buildings of Ralph Erskine in Stockholm to doing a series of interviews with Rem Koolhaas in the Netherlands and photographing the Norman Foster's HSBC Building just opened in Hong Kong. During this period he interviewed Claes Oldenburg and Coosje van Bruggen in New York after meeting them in Utrecht and visited the studio of Ed Ruscha in Los Angeles. His encounter with great artist and photographer Lewis Baltz was the beginning of a long friendship, marked by a common interest both in art history and The Great Game. Boissiere wrote texts for some of Baltz's projects, such as Fos Secteur 80 at Tate, La Ronde de Nuit, shown at Centre Georges Pompidou and later Piazza Arnolfo in Tuscany. His first meeting with Jean Nouvel had happened during this time.

== 1990s – working with Jean Nouvel, book publishing ==
The competition for the Kansai International Airport in Japan in the late 80's did mark the beginning of an ongoing episodic collaboration with Jean Nouvel, according to projects, competitions and circumstances. Olivier Boissière acted as a researcher, commentator, advisor and publication editor on different projects in real time, which was full-time with Nouvel, the motto of his office being "If you don't come on Saturday, forget to come back on Sunday!" In the intervals he worked both as author and director of the architectural collections for two publishing houses in Paris and did extensive trips in Europe and India, doing a close survey on the legacy of Le Corbusier along with Dominique Lyon and photographer Anriet Denis. The most significant ХХ century houses in Europe ranging from the Art Nouveau to the British high tech was the subject for another book. A trip to the South West Arizona and New Mexico provided for meetings with architects Antoine Predock and Bart Prince . As a guest of Donald Judd, Boissière did a large photo survey of the Chinati Foundation in Marfa, Texas with major artworks and installations by Chamberlain, Oldenburg and Donald Judd himself.

== 2000s – between East and West ==
At the beginning of 2000, Boissiere was a coordinator for Jean Nouvel's Morat site for the Expo.02 in Switzerland. Along with Federico Mazzoto he also coordinated Nouvel's project for Piazza Arnolfo in Colle d'Elsa, featuring artists Daniel Buren, Lewis Baltz, Alessandra Tesi, Bertrand Lavier. Following up Nouvel's projects for the Guggenheim Foundation, directed by Thomas Krens, he visited Baku and The Republic of Azerbaidjan, Rio de Janeiro and Oscar Niemeyer's office, and was granted private visits of the Hermitage in Saint Petersburg and the Kunsthistorisches Museum in Vienna. Since 1997 Olivier Boissiere has been shifting between Paris and Sofia. Along with Anriet Denis he established Adob Design in Sofia - a showroom, promoting good design, which introduced for the first time in Bulgaria the furniture of the Eames, Jasper Morrison, Marc Newson, Ron Arad and Frank Gehry, the lights of Achille Castiglioni and Ingo Maurer and organized exhibitions where Gehry, Maurer and Nouvel were presented. For more than 15 years his voice has resonated as a commentator of the creative processes in Bulgaria. His ongoing commitment for sustainable architecture has been guiding a few of the young Bulgarian architects. In 2010 Olivier Boissiere has been the coordinator of the first ABITARE Talks Conference in Sofia “Do we need museums and galleries” with speakers Jean Nouvel, Italo Rota, David Cascaro and Monique Veaute. Under his proficient eye in 2011 the first Sofia Architecture Week was organized by One Magazine, where Boissiere introduced French architects like Anne Lacaton, Dominique Lyon, Frédéric Borel and Rudy Ricciotti.

== 2012 onwards – Un Cabinet d'Amateur ==
Being a modest art collector himself, Olivier Boissière worked closely with the emerging talents on the Bulgarian art scene, some of which he presented at his private apartment/gallery in Sofia. Un Cabinet d'Amateur, devoted to Bulgarian and foreign contemporary art, was established in 2012 and has exhibited works of Kalin Serapionov, Svetlana Mircheva, Marie Maillard, Stela Vassileva, Lewis Baltz, Jean-Charles Blais, Sophie Calle. Along with artworks, the Cabinet accommodated a small library with Boissere's personal collection of books, catalogs and documents from his longtime journey in the field. In 2015 Boissiere was an advisor to the team of architects Manal Rachdi and Sou Fujimoto in the "Reinventer Paris" competition. It was a winning entry for a block at Porte Maillot.

Olivier Boissière is deceased.

== Books and publications ==
- Gehry, Site, Tigerman. 3 portraits de l’artiste en architecte, Editions de Moniteur, 1981, ISBN 2-86282-168-3
- Streamline. The American design of the 30s, Rivages Style, 1987, ISBN 2-86930-103-0
- Lewis Baltz, Portfolio of Fos Secteur 80, Précis du terrain vague, Edition Galerie Michele Chomette Paris, 1988
- Lewis Baltz, La Ronde nuit Check list Soundtrack by Anneliese Centre régional de la photographie Nord pas de Calais and Pompidou Centre, 1992
- Frank Gehry, Architecture d’Aujourd’hui Special, 1989
- Vitra Design Museum Basel by Frank Gehry (with Martin Filler), Thames and Hudson, 1990, ISBN 0500973814
- Philippe Starck, Taschen, 1994, ISBN 3822897523
- Jean Nouvel, Editions Studio Paperback, 1993, ISBN 3764353562
- Jean Nouvel/Emmanuel Cattani Ass, Editions Birkhauser Switzerland, 1994-1998, ISBN 3775702857
- The Unbuilt Jean Nouvel. 100 projects (with Takaaki Tomishige), Kenchiku Bunka, 1995
- Architecture for the Future (with Sheila de Vallée), Rizzoli, 1996, ISBN 2879390281
- Jean Nouvel, A Monography, Editions Bayard/Pierre Terrail 1996, ISBN 2879391059
- Twentieth-Century Houses in Europe, Editions Bayard/Pierre Terrail, 1997–98, ISBN 2-87939-111-3
- Ron Arad (with Raymond Guidot), Dis Voir Paris, 1997, ISBN 290657158X
- New Museums (with Catherine Donzel), Telleri, 1998, ISBN 2745000365
- American Contemporary Houses, Telleri, 1998, ISBN 2745000217
- Outstanding Shop Designs (Art of the Habitat), Telleri, 1998, ISBN 274500011X
- Le Corbusier vivant (with Dominique Lyon and Anriet Denis, photographer), Telleri, 1999, ISBN 2745000659
- Ch ou l’âge du capitaine. A novel. Editions Sens & Tonka, 2001, ISBN 2-84534-026-5,
- Being Jean Nouvel (editor, with Maria Giulia Zunino), Abitare, 2012
- I/O Architects 2002-2013, forward, 2013, ISBN 9789549411317
- Seven love songs, artbook by Jean Charles Blais. Un Cabinet d'Amateur, 2013
- Look at me, David. A photo album by Kalin Cerapionov. Un Cabinet d’Amateur, 2014
