= Cristoforo Coriolano =

German engraver (born 1540)

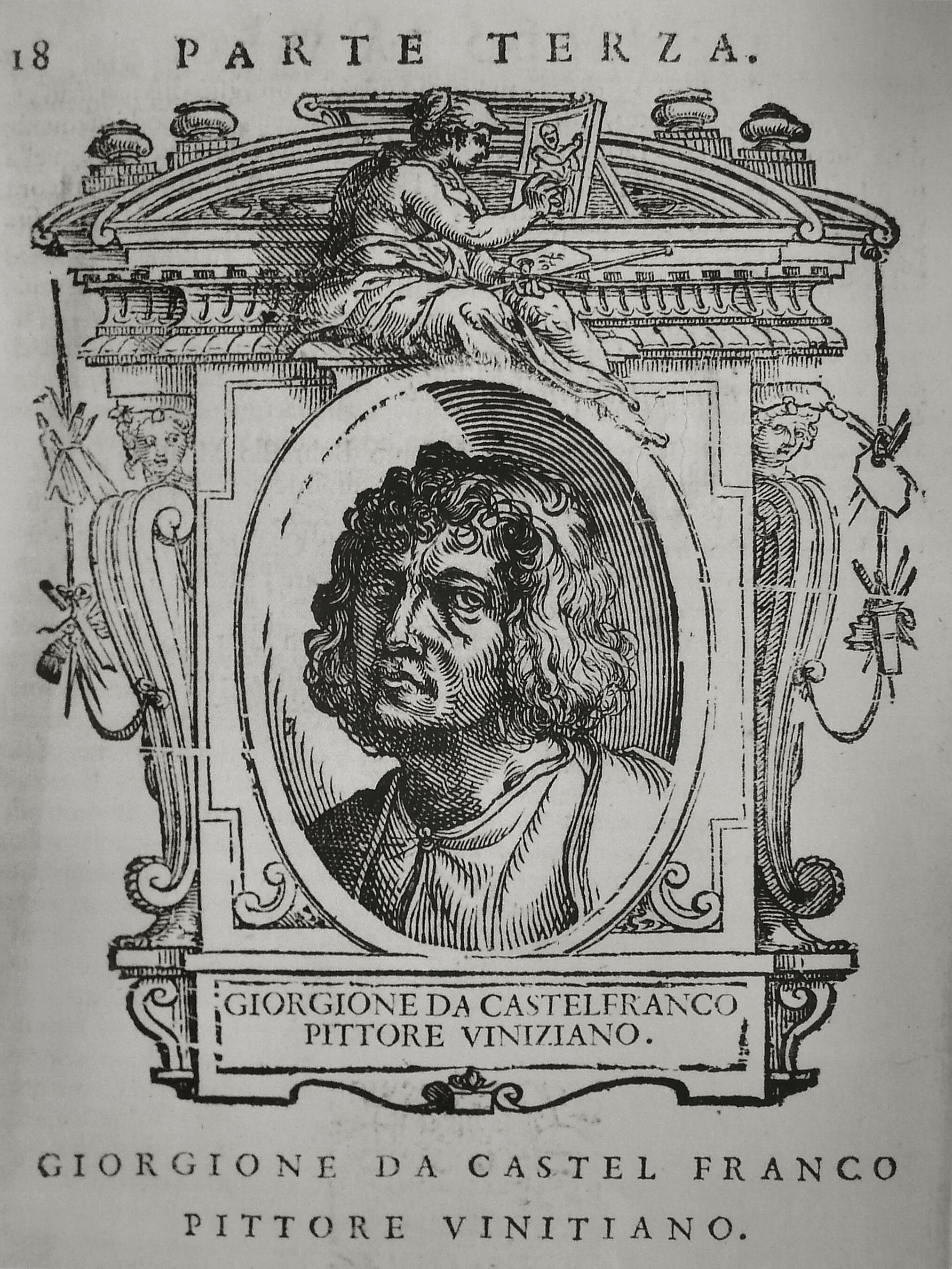
Portrait of Giorgione, engraved by Cristoforo Corionano after Giorgio Vasari, Lives of the Most Excellent Painters, Sculptors, and Architects, 1568

Cristoforo Coriolano ([kriˈstɔːforo korjoˈlaːno]) (born 1540) was a German engraver of the Renaissance.

== Biography ==
He was born in Nuremberg. He moved to Italy and changed his name from Lederer to that of Coriolano. He engraved on wood. In the Life of Marcantonio Raimondi, the biographer Vasari assured that his Maestro Cristofano, after achieving some success in Venice, engraved on wood the portraits of the painters, sculptors, and architects, after Vasari's designs, for his Lives of the Painters, first published in 1568. Others consider them to be the work of Christopher Krieger. He also engraved the greater part of the figures in the Ornithology of Ulisse Aldrovandi. He died in Venice at the beginning of the 17th century. His sons Giovanni Battista Coriolano and Bartolommeo Coriolano became eminent engravers in the Baroque period.
