= Olivier Donat Andriamahefaparany =

Malagasy politician

Olivier Donat Andriamahefaparany is a Malagasy politician. A member of the National Assembly of Madagascar, he was elected as a member of the Tiako I Madagasikara party; he represents the fifth constituency of Antananarivo.
