= Giovanni Battista Coriolano =

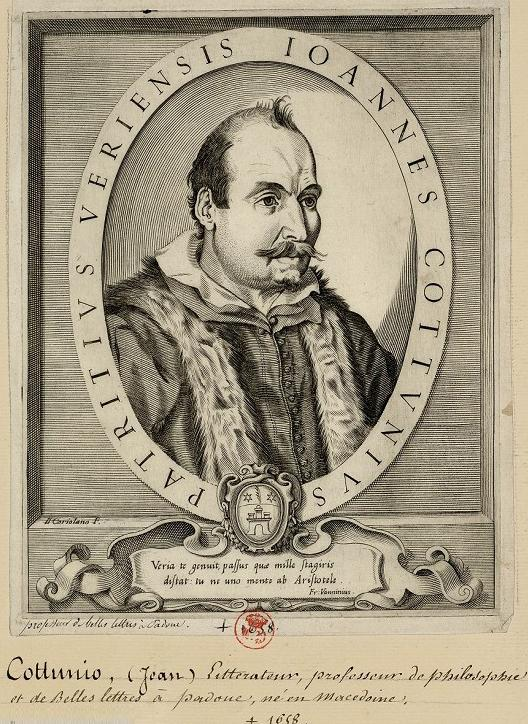
Portrait of Ioannis Kottounios by Giovanni Battista Coriolano

Giovanni Battista Coriolano (1590–1649) was an Italian engraver of the Baroque period.

He was almost certainly the son of the German transplant to Italy, the engraver Cristoforo Coriolano. Giovanni Battista was born and died in Bologna. He studied painting under Giovanni Luigi Valesio, but found little work painting in churches at Bologna. He painted a St. Nicholas and a St. Bruno for the church of Santa Anna; and an altarpiece of Saints John, James, & Bernard for the Nunziata.

He was more successful as an engraver, the main familial profession, and worked both on wood and on copper. His engravings in chiaroscuro are dated from 1619 to 1625. In style they recall Francesco Villamena. They include:

- Portrait of Vincenzo Sgualdi
- Fortunius Licetus
- Joannes Cottunius
- Image of the Virgin
- Miraculous Image of Virgin painted by St. Luke, held by 3 angels and Cupid sleeping after Reni
- Virgin and Child, & St. John after Alessandro Tiarini
- Christ crowned with thorns; etched in imitation of a woodcut after Lodovico Carracci
- Twenty-seven plates for the Emblemata moralia aere incisa et versibus italicis explicata (1628) of Paolo Maccio; the entire work consists of eighty-three plates on iconography; the remaining 56 being by Oliviero Gatti and A. Parasina
- Triumphal Arch in honor of Louis XIII

He also engraved a number of theses and frontispieces.
