= René Pitter =

Austrian footballer

Personal information
- Full name: René Pitter
- Date of birth: 8 July 1989 (age 37)
- Place of birth: Bruck an der Mur, Austria
- Height: 1.76 m (5 ft 9 1/2 in)
- Position: Defender

Senior career*
Years	Team	Apps	(Gls)
2006–2013	Kapfenberg	63	(1)
- * Club domestic league appearances and goals as of 13 May 2013

René Pitter (born 8 July 1989) is an Austrian former professional association football player who spent his entire playing career at Kapfenberger SV. He played as a defender and decided to retire at the age of 23 after undergoing hyaline cartilage. He currently works as the manager of Kapfenberger youth team.
