= Olivier Antonny José Randrianantenaina =

Malagasy politician

Olivier Antonny José Randrianantenaina is a Malagasy politician. He is a member of the National Assembly of Madagascar, he was elected as a member of the Tiako I Madagasikara party. He was elected in 2002 and reelected in 2007, 2013 and 2019. He represents the second constituency of Antsirabe.
