= Svetlana Mircheva =

Bulgarian artist (born 1976)

Svetlana Mircheva (Bulgarian: Светлана Мирчева) (born 1976) is a Bulgarian artist, who was nominated for a 2010 Baza Award by the Institute of Contemporary Art, Sofia. In 2012, she displayed her artwork titled Images of the Word at the Un Cabinet D'Amateur art gallery in Sofia, Bulgaria.

== Life and work ==
Svetlana Mircheva was born in Kazanlak, Bulgaria. She studied at National Academy of Art and completed her MA in industrial design, Multimedia class in 2000.

Her solo exhibitions are Random show at Vaska Emanouilova Gallery, branch of Sofia City Gallery, Sofia (2011), Possible exhibitions at Nurture Art Gallery, New York (2012), 103 Mistakes at Un Cabinet D'Amateur Gallery, Sofia (2012), Images of the word at Un Cabinet D'Amateur Gallery, Sofia (2014).

She is one of the artists of Un Cabinet D'Amateur Gallery, Sofia, founded by Olivier Boissiere.
