= Olivio =

Olivio may refer to:

- Olivio (restaurant), Dutch Michelin starred restaurant
- Olivio (given name)
