= Olivér Pittner =

Hungarian painter

- Born: Olivér Pittner; July 3, 1911; Lupény
- Died: July 9, 1971 (aged 60); Marosvásárhely
- Style: Cubism

Olivér Pittner (Lupény, July 3, 1911 - Marosvásárhely, July 9, 1971) was a Transylvanian Hungarian painter, newspaper editor.

== Biography ==
He completed his secondary schooling in Argentina, where he lived with his parents, who emigrated to South America, until the end of the twenties. After settling back home, he completed his art studies at the painting school in Nagybánya between 1930-34. At the painting studio, he became a committed follower of Cubism, and his work in this direction is increasingly valuable in the light of recent research.

== His work ==
Due to his leftist positions, the Romanian authorities interned him in Caracal in 1940. After the Vienna decision, he moved to Marosvásárhely. He became the founding responsible editor and publisher of Szabad Szó until September 1945; In 1945, he was the founder and secretary of the Salamon Ernő Népi Athenaeum, and in 1946, the financial director of the Székely Theater in Marosvásárhely. Around 1955, he started painting again in a decorative-surrealist style, different from the early cubist pictures.
