= Oliviero Forzetta =

Oliviero Forzetta (fl. 1335–1373) was a notary and physician of Treviso from a family of self-confessed usurers. He engaged in money-lending, married into the local aristocracy, and was an avid collector of Roman antiquities of all kinds and drawings, dying a very rich man. He was not himself a scholar. He was actively searching out marbles, bronzes, coins and engraved gems as early as 1335, according to his surviving "wish list". His example was innovative in that he did not acquire objects because they were of rare or unusual materials, but precisely because they were old; the collection was published in a catalogue in 1369, the earliest such catalogue to exist to this day. One of his consistent sources was the workshop of a Venetian painter, Angelo Tedaldo, otherwise virtually unknown. His collections, more typical of the following century than of his own, were dispersed at his death. His Latin library—for he had nothing in the vulgar (Italian) tongue—of at least 136 manuscripts was bequeathed between the Augustinians and Franciscans of Treviso, with the proviso that the books should be made available to secular men as well as the brothers. Luciano Gargan has published other contemporaneous libraries of secular individuals, to provide contrast and emphasize the unusual character of Forzetta's reading: classical texts, the Latin Church Fathers and medieval commentaries, as well as numerous twelfth- and thirteenth-century works on science and ethics, and some poetry.
