= Oliviero Zega =

Italian footballer

Personal information
- Date of birth: January 4, 1924
- Place of birth: Rome, Italy
- Date of death: 7 September 2012
- Position: Midfielder

Senior career*
Years	Team	Apps	(Gls)
1943–1944	Avia Roma	14	(5)
1945–1946	Alba Ala Roma		
1947–1948	Roma	1	(0)
- * Club domestic league appearances and goals

Oliviero Zega (4 January 1924 – 7 September 2012) was an Italian professional footballer.

He played one match in the 1947/48 Serie A season for A.S. Roma.
