= Coriolano Vighi =

Italian painter (1852–1905)

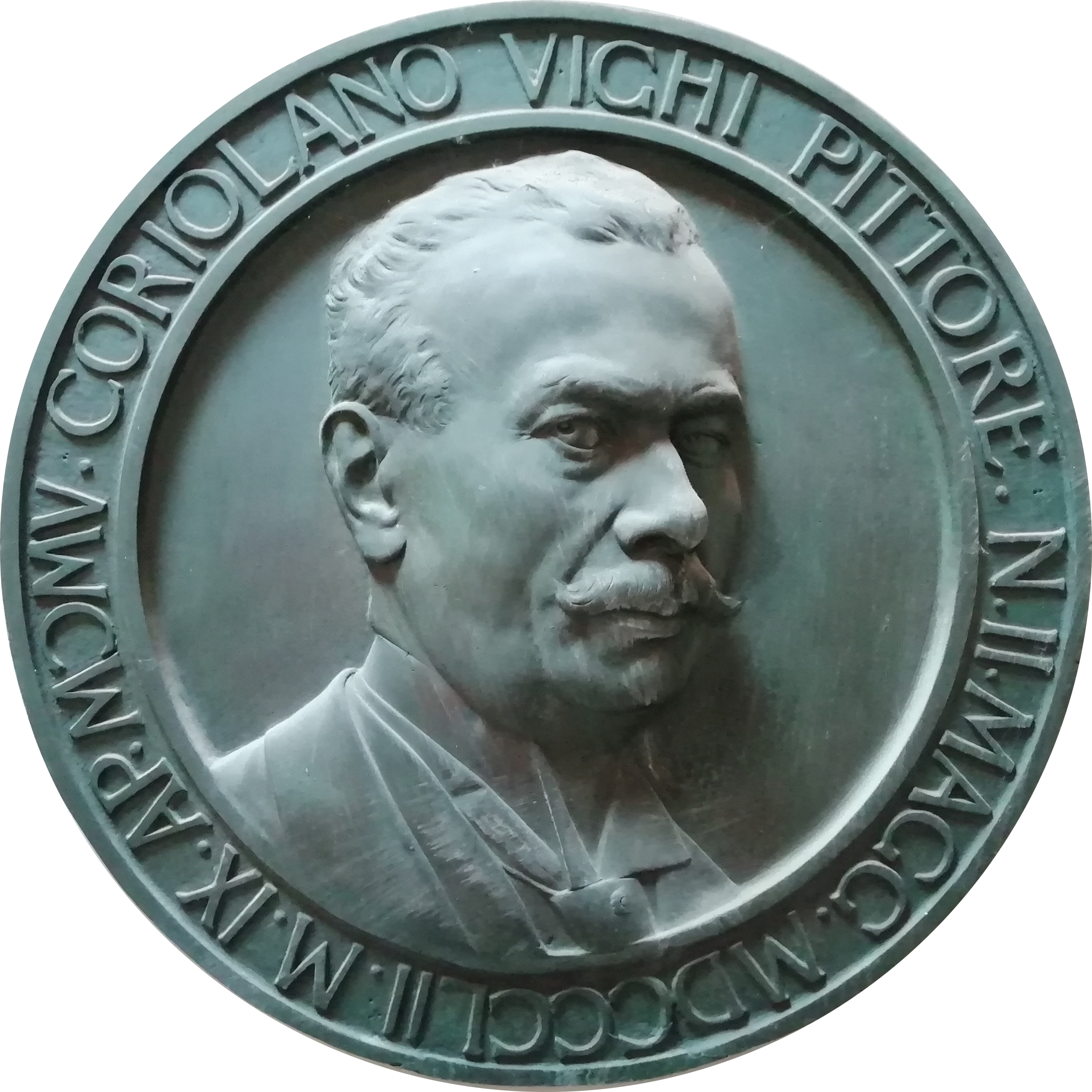
Portrait of Coriolano Vighi.

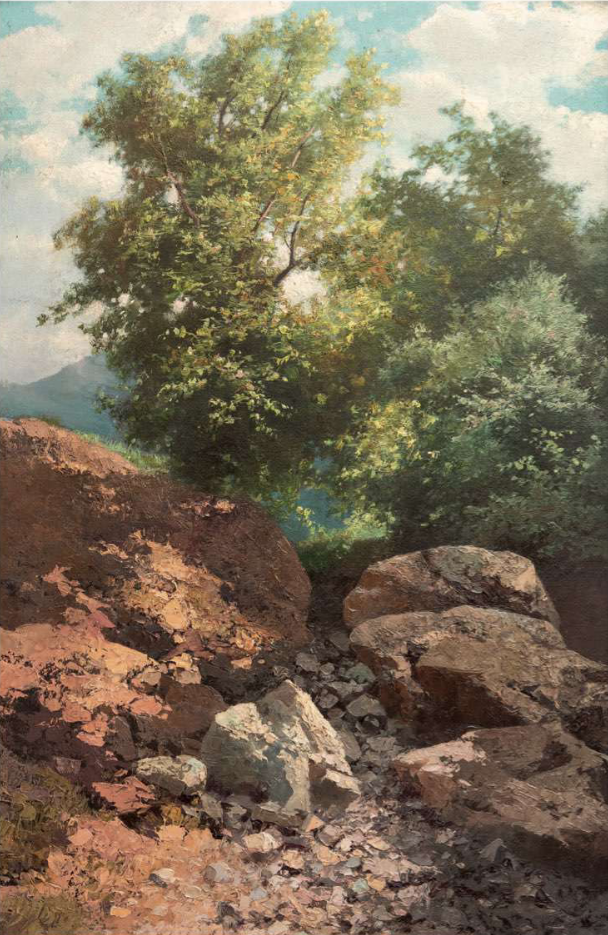
Scorcio di bosco

Coriolano Vighi (1852–1905) was an Italian painter, mainly of landscapes.

He was born in Florence, resident in Bologna. In 1880 at Turin, he exhibited: Interval of Rain. The next year in Milan, he exhibited Dai verdi, Lungo un fiume, Era il Giugno, and Crepuscolo. In 1884 at Turin, he exhibited: Countryside mesta and Pace ignorata; and in 1888 at Bologna, he exhibited: L'avvicinarsi della procella, a pastel work.
