= Oliwier =

- Pronunciation: Polish: [/ɔ.ˈli.vjɛr/]
- Gender: Male
- Language: Polish

Origin
- Languages: Latin, Germanic
- Meaning: '"Elf army", "Olive tree"

Other names
- Variant form: Olwer. Oliwer
- Anglicisation: Oliver
- Related names: Oliver

Oliwier is a Polish masculine given name form of Oliver. Notable people with the name include:

- Oliwier Bednarek (born 2003), Polish basketball player
- Oliwier Dondziło (born 2008), Polish athlete
- Oliwier Jahn (born 2007), Polisb powerlifter
- Oliwier Mutwil (born 1999), Polish athlete
- Oliwier Roszczyk also known as Bonus RPK (born 1989), Polish rapper
- Oliwier Sławiński (born 2005), Polish footballer
- Oliwier Wojciechowski (born 2005), Polish footballer
- Oliwier Zych (born 2004), Polish footballer

== See also ==
- Oliver
