= Oliviero Gatti =

Italian painter and engraver

Oliviero Gatti (1579–1648), an Italian painter and engraver, was a native of Parma. He was a scholar of Giovanni Lodovico Valesio, and, from the resemblance of his style, although greatly inferior, to that of Agostino Carracci, was probably instructed in engraving by that master. His works as a painter are little known; but he engraved several plates, some of which are after his own designs, which possess considerable merit. He was received into the Academy at Bologna in 1626 and was working in that city up to 1648.

One of his pupils appears to be Giovanni Battista Pasqualini.

The following prints are by him:

- St Francis Xavier kneeling on the sea-shore, and taking up a Crucifix, which is floating on the water; after his own design.
- The Virgin caressing the Infant Christ; after Lorenzo Garbieri.
- St Jerome; after Agostino Carracci. 1602.
- St Roch. 1605.
- An emblematical subject, representing an Armorial Bearing, supported by two River Gods, with an armed figure, standing alone, surrounded by Jupiter, Hercules, Neptune, Apollo, and Minerva; after L. Carracci.
- A set of four small plates, representing the Deity forming the World, the Creation of Adam, the Sacrifice of Abraham, and Judith with the Head of Holofernes; after Pordenone.
- A drawing-book; after the designs of Guercino.
