= Oliverio =

Oliverio is a surname. Notable people with the name include:

- Alberto Oliverio (born 1938), biologist and psycho-biologist
- Alessandro Oliverio (1500–1544), Italian painter
- Donato Oliverio (born 1956), Bishop of the Eparchy of Lungro, Calabria, Italy
- James Oliverio, American composer of film scores and contemporary classical music
- Mario Oliverio (born 1953), Italian politician
- Mike Oliverio (born 1963), former State Senator, 2010 Democratic nominee for West Virginia
- Pierluigi Oliverio (born 1969), the District 6 Council member on the San Jose City Council
- Simone Oliverio (died 1668), Roman Catholic prelate, Bishop of Fondi (1662–1668)

== See also ==
- Oliverio (given name)
