= Oliwer =

- Pronunciation: Polish: [/ɔ.ˈli.vɛr/]
- Gender: Male
- Language: Polish

Origin
- Languages: Latin, Germanic
- Meaning: '"Elf army", "Olive tree"

Other names
- Variant form: Olwer. Oliwier
- Anglicisation: Oliver

Oliwer is a Polish masculine given name form of Oliver. Notable people with the name include:

- Oliwer Kaski (born 1995), Finnish ice hockey player
- Oliwer Magnusson (born 2000), Swedish freestyle skier
- Oliwer Stark (born 2006), Swedish footballer
- Oliwer Stedt, Swedish American football player
- Oliwer Wdowik (born 2002), Polish sprinter
